= Asian Artistic Gymnastics Championships – Men's team all-around =

The Asian Artistic Gymnastics Championships were first held in 1996.

Three medals are awarded: gold for first place, silver for second place, and bronze for third place.

== Medalists ==
Year	Location	Gold	Silver	Bronze
1996	(China) Changsha	China	South Korea	Japan
2003	(China) Guangzhou	China; Liang Fuliang; Feng Jing; Lu Bin; Li Dezhi	Japan; Yoshihiro Saito; Akihiro Kasamatsu; Masaki Endo; Yasuhiro Ogawa	South Korea; Yang Tae-young; Lee Sun-sung; Kim Dae-eun; Cho Seong-min
2006	(India) Surat	China; Chen Yibing; Liang Fuliang; Zou Kai; Dong Zhendong	Japan; Tomoharu Sano; Hiroaki Kusu; Kazusa Fujita; Ryuta Nakazato	South Korea; Yoo Won-chul; Kim Ji-hoon; Kim Soo-myun; Yoo Jin-wook
2008	(Qatar) Doha	Japan; Naoyuki Terao; Koji Yamamuro; Yosuke Hoshi; Shoichi Yamamoto; Ryosuke Baba; Go Tagashira	South Korea; Kim Soo-myun; Ha Chang-ju; Shin Hyung-ok; Lee Sang-wook; Kim Sang-woo; Yoo Jin-wook	North Korea; Ro Chol-jin; Kim Jin-hyok; Ri Se-gwang; Kim Kyong-hak; Ri Chol-jin
2012	(China) Putian	China; Zhou Shixiong; Lin Chaopan; Ji Lianshen; Liu Rongbing; Cheng Ran; Yang Shengchao	Japan; Minori Koyama; Yoshiaki Furutani; Takayuki Ohara; Yu Suzuki; Rikii Hoshino; Kenzō Shirai	North Korea; Ri Se-gwang; Kim Jin-hyok; Ro Chol-jin; Kim Kwang-chun; Ri Chol-jin; Kim Kyong-hak
2015	(Japan) Hiroshima	Japan; Naoto Hayasaka; Yusuke Tanaka; Ryohei Kato; Kazuma Kaya; Koji Yamamuro; Kenzō Shirai	China; Ji Lianshen; He Youxiao; Zhu Xiaodong; Wu Di; Sun Wei; Xiao Ruoteng	South Korea; Yoo Won-chul; Lee Sang-wook; Shin Dong-hyen; Jo Yeong-gwang; Kim Han-sol; Lee Jun-ho
2017	(Thailand) Bangkok	China; Lin Chaopan; Sun Wei; Liu Rongbing; Xiao Ruoteng; Zou Jingyuan	South Korea; Jo Yeong-gwang; Park Min-soo; Kim Han-sol; Lee Jung-hyo; Lee Jae-seong	Japan; Hayato Uchida; Jun Muraoka; Shuto Horiuchi; Tatsuki Ichise; Hiroki Ishikawa
2019	(Mongolia) Ulaanbaatar	China; Liu Rongbing; Lan Xingyu; Huang Mingqi; Hu Xuwei; Yang Jiaxing	Japan; Daisuke Fudono; Hibiki Arayashiki; Minori Haruki; Tatsuki Tanaka; Junpei Oka	Chinese Taipei; Lee Chih-kai; Tang Chia-hung; Shiao Yu-jan; Hsu Ping-chien; Lin Guan-yi
2022	(Qatar) Doha	China; Shi Cong; Yang Jiaxing; Yin Dehang; Lin Chaopan; Lan Xingyu	Japan; Koki Maeda; Shiga Tachibana; Tsuyoshi Hasegawa; Daiki Hidaka; Kenya Yuasa	Chinese Taipei; Tang Chia-hung; Lee Chih-kai; Lin Guan-yi; Hung Yuan-hsi; Tseng Wei-sheng
2023	Singapore	China; Lan Xingyu; Su Weide; Tian Hao; Yin Dehang; Xie Chenyi; Ta Yinga	Japan; Takeru Kitazono; Shinnosuke Oka; Fumiya Sasaki; Ryota Tsumura; Motomu Yoshida	Kazakhstan; Ilyas Azizov; Milad Karimi; Nariman Kurbanov; Dmitriy Patanin; Alisher Toibazarov; Diyas Toishybek
2024	(Uzbekistan) Tashkent	China; Yin Dehang; Tian Hao; Xie Chenyi; Yang Yanzhi; Liao Jialei	Uzbekistan; Abdulla Azimov; Utkirbek Juraev; Abdulaziz Mirvaliev; Rasuljon Abdurakhimov; Khabibullo Ergashev	South Korea; Park Seung-ho; Kim Jae-ho; Moon Geon-yong; Lee Jang-won; Hur Woong
2025	(South Korea) Jecheon	Japan; Shumpei Fujimaki; Tsuyoshi Hasegawa; Kazuma Kaya; Shinnosuke Oka; Tomoharu Tsunogai	China; Huang Mingqi; Lan Xingyu; Shi Cong; Tian Hao; Yang Haonan	Kazakhstan; Ilyas Azizov; Milad Karimi; Nariman Kurbanov; Roman Mamenov; Dmitriy Patanin
2026	(China) Zunyi	China; Li Hongyan; Liu Yang; Tian Hao; Yang Haonan; Zhang Boheng	Japan; Tsuyoshi Hasegawa; Fusuke Maeda; Teppei Miwa; Wataru Tanigawa; Shoma Tsukiyama	South Korea; Hur Woong; Kim Jae-ho; Lee Jung-hyo; Ryu Sung-hyun; Seo Jung-won

== Medal table ==
Rank	Nation	Gold	Silver	Bronze	Total
1	China (CHN)	10	2	0	12
2	Japan (JPN)	3	7	2	12
3	South Korea (KOR)	0	3	5	8
4	Uzbekistan (UZB)	0	1	0	1
5	Chinese Taipei (TPE)	0	0	2	2
5	Kazakhstan (KAZ)	0	0	2	2
5	North Korea (PRK)	0	0	2	2
Totals (7 entries)		13	13	13	39
