= Asian Artistic Gymnastics Championships – Men's horizontal bar =

The Asian Artistic Gymnastics Championships were first held in 1996.

Three medals are awarded: gold for first place, silver for second place, and bronze for third place.

== Medalists ==
Year	Location	Gold	Silver	Bronze
1996	(China) Changsha	(China) Cheng Liang	(China) Shen Jian	(South Korea) Han Yoon-soo
2003	(China) Guangzhou	(Kazakhstan) Yernar Yerimbetov	(Kazakhstan) Stepan Gorbachev (China) Liang Fuliang	Not awarded
2006	(India) Surat	(China) Zou Kai	(Japan) Ryuta Nakazato	(Japan) Tomoharu Sano
2008	(Qatar) Doha	(Japan) Yosuke Hoshi	(Japan) Ryosuke Baba	(North Korea) Ro Chol-jin
2012	(China) Putian	(China) Liu Rongbing	(China) Lin Chaopan	(Japan) Yoshiaki Furutani (Japan) Takayuki Ohara
2015	(Japan) Hiroshima	(Japan) Yusuke Tanaka	(Hong Kong) Shek Wai Hung	(South Korea) Lee Jun-ho
2017	(Thailand) Bangkok	(China) Lin Chaopan	(China) Xiao Ruoteng	(Kazakhstan) Milad Karimi
2019	(Mongolia) Ulaanbaatar	(China) Hu Xuwei	(Chinese Taipei) Tang Chia-hung	(Vietnam) Lê Thanh Tùng
2022	(Qatar) Doha	(South Korea) Yun Jin-seong	(China) Lin Chaopan	(Kazakhstan) Milad Karimi
2023	Singapore	(China) Tian Hao	(Japan) Shinnosuke Oka	(Philippines) Carlos Yulo
2024	(Uzbekistan) Tashkent	(Kazakhstan) Milad Karimi	(China) Tian Hao	(China) Liao Jialei
2025	(South Korea) Jecheon	(Chinese Taipei) Tang Chia-hung	(Japan) Tomoharu Tsunogai	(China) Tian Hao
2026	(China) Zunyi	(Chinese Taipei) Tang Chia-hung	(China) Zhang Boheng	(Japan) Fusuke Maeda

== Medal table ==
Rank	Nation	Gold	Silver	Bronze	Total
1	China (CHN)	6	7	2	15
2	Japan (JPN)	2	4	4	10
3	Kazakhstan (KAZ)	2	1	2	5
4	Chinese Taipei (TPE)	2	1	0	3
5	South Korea (KOR)	1	0	2	3
6	Hong Kong (HKG)	0	1	0	1
7	North Korea (PRK)	0	0	1	1
7	Philippines (PHI)	0	0	1	1
7	Vietnam (VIE)	0	0	1	1
Totals (9 entries)		13	14	13	40
