= Asian Artistic Gymnastics Championships – Men's rings =

The Asian Artistic Gymnastics Championships were first held in 1996.

Three medals are awarded: gold for first place, silver for second place, and bronze for third place.

== Medalists ==
Year	Location	Gold	Silver	Bronze
1996	(China) Changsha	(China) Fan Hongbin	(China) Huang Xu	(Thailand) Amornthep Waewsang
2003	(China) Guangzhou	(China) Feng Jing (Kazakhstan) Timur Kurbanbayev	Not awarded	(China) Lu Bin
2006	(India) Surat	(China) Chen Yibing	(Hong Kong) Zhong Jian	(Chinese Taipei) Weng Shih-hang
2008	(Qatar) Doha	(Kazakhstan) Timur Kurbanbayev	(Japan) Koji Yamamuro	(Jordan) Ali Al-Asi
2012	(China) Putian	(North Korea) Ri Se-gwang	(China) Yang Shengchao	(Chinese Taipei) Chen Chih-yu (Hong Kong) Ng Kiu Chung
2015	(Japan) Hiroshima	(Japan) Koji Yamamuro	(Chinese Taipei) Chen Chih-yu	(Iran) Hadi Khanarinejad
2017	(Thailand) Bangkok	(China) Zou Jingyuan	(Hong Kong) Ng Kiu Chung	(Chinese Taipei) Chen Chih-yu
2019	(Mongolia) Ulaanbaatar	(China) Lan Xingyu	(North Korea) Jong Ryong-il	(Iran) Mehdi Ahmad Kohani
2022	(Qatar) Doha	(China) Lan Xingyu	(Iran) Mehdi Ahmad Kohani	(Chinese Taipei) Lin Guan-yi
2023	Singapore	(China) Lan Xingyu	(Vietnam) Nguyễn Văn Khánh Phong	(Hong Kong) Ng Kiu Chung
2024	(Uzbekistan) Tashkent	(China) Yin Dehang	(Vietnam) Nguyễn Văn Khánh Phong (China) Yang Yanzhi	Not awarded
2025	(South Korea) Jecheon	(China) Lan Xingyu	(China) Yang Haonan	(Iran) Siavash Siahi
2026	(China) Zunyi	(China) Yang Haonan	(China) Zhang Boheng	(Iran) Mehdi Ahmad Kohani

== Medal table ==
Rank	Nation	Gold	Silver	Bronze	Total
1	China (CHN)	10	5	1	16
2	Kazakhstan (KAZ)	2	0	0	2
3	Japan (JPN)	1	1	0	2
3	North Korea (PRK)	1	1	0	2
5	Hong Kong (HKG)	0	2	2	4
6	Vietnam (VIE)	0	2	0	2
7	Chinese Taipei (TPE)	0	1	4	5
7	Iran (IRI)	0	1	4	5
9	Jordan (JOR)	0	0	1	1
9	Thailand (THA)	0	0	1	1
11	South Korea (KOR)	0	0	0	0
Totals (11 entries)		14	13	13	40
