= 2026 in artistic gymnastics =

Below is a list of notable men's and women's artistic gymnastics international events scheduled to be held in 2026 as well as the medalists.

== Retirements ==
Gymnasts who announced retirements in 2026
Gymnast	Country	Date	Ref
James Hall	Great Britain	15 January 2026	
Eddie Penev	Bulgaria	20 January 2026	
Denelle Pedrick	Canada	26 January 2026	
Aline Friess	France	27 January 2026	
Giorgia Villa	Italy	16 May 2026	
Lieke Wevers	Netherlands	12 June 2026	
Ana Pérez	Spain	7 July 2026	
Ahmet Önder	Turkey	17 July 2026	
Nicola Bartolini	Italy	26 July 2026	
Amalia Ghigoarță	Romania	30 July 2026	
Bart Deurloo	Netherlands	4 September 2026	
Sanne Wevers	Netherlands	19 October 2026	

== Nationality changes ==
Gymnasts who changed nationalities in 2026
Gymnast	From	To	Ref
Radomyr Stelmakh	Ukraine	Germany	
Djenna Laroui	France	Algeria	
Adam Lakomy	United States	Czech Republic	
Tiana Sumanasekera	United States	Sri Lanka	
Ioannis Chronopoulos	Canada	Greece	

== Calendar of events ==
Date	Location	Event	Men's winners	Women's winners
February 19–22	(Germany) Cottbus	FIG World Cup	FX: (Israel) Artem Dolgopyat; PH: (Italy) Gabriele Targhetta; SR: (Armenia) Artur Avetisyan; VT: (Ukraine) Nazar Chepurnyi; PB: (Japan) Shohei Kawakami; HB: (Japan) Shohei Kawakami	VT: (Individual Neutral Athletes) Anna Kalmykova; UB: (Italy) Elisa Iorio; BB: (Japan) Aiko Sugihara; FX: (Individual Neutral Athletes) Anna Kalmykova
March 5–8	(Azerbaijan) Baku	FIG World Cup	FX: (Individual Neutral Athletes) Yahor Sharamkou; PH: (Bulgaria) David Ivanov; SR: (Individual Neutral Athletes) Ilia Zaika; VT: (Ukraine) Nazar Chepurnyi; PB: (Colombia) Ángel Barajas; HB: (Chinese Taipei) Tang Chia-hung	VT: (Individual Neutral Athletes) Anna Kalmykova; UB: (Algeria) Kaylia Nemour; BB: (Japan) Mana Okamura; FX: (Japan) Mana Okamura
March 7	(United States) Las Vegas	American Cup	Mixed Team: China	
March 12–15	(Turkey) Antalya	FIG World Cup	FX: (Philippines) Eldrew Yulo; PH: (Republic of Ireland) Rhys McClenaghan; SR: (Turkey) Adem Asil; VT: (Norway) Sebastian Sponevik; PB: (Japan) Shinnosuke Oka; HB: (Chinese Taipei) Tang Chia-hung	VT: (Individual Neutral Athletes) Liudmila Roshchina; UB: (Individual Neutral Athletes) Milana Kaiumova; BB: (Individual Neutral Athletes) Milana Kaiumova; FX: (Individual Neutral Athletes) Liudmila Roshchina
April 3–6	(Egypt) Cairo	FIG World Cup	FX: (Individual Neutral Athletes) Daniel Marinov; PH: (Armenia) Hamlet Manukyan; SR: (Greece) Eleftherios Petrounias; VT: (Armenia) Artur Davtyan; PB: (China) Liu Yang; HB: (China) Li Hongyan	VT: (Spain) Laia Font; UB: (Algeria) Kaylia Nemour; BB: (Algeria) Kaylia Nemour; FX: (China) Ke Qinqin
April 9–12	(Croatia) Osijek	FIG World Cup	FX: (Israel) Artem Dolgopyat; PH: (Armenia) Hamlet Manukyan; SR: (China) Liu Hengyu; VT: (United Kingdom) Harry Hepworth; PB: (Colombia) Ángel Barajas; HB: (Chinese Taipei) Tang Chia-Hung	VT: (Germany) Karina Schönmaier; UB: (China) Yang Fanyuwei; BB: (Italy) Manila Esposito; FX: (France) Elena Colas
~~April 15–18~~	(Qatar) Doha	~~FIG World Cup~~	Cancelled	
April 16–18	Panama City	2026 South American Youth Games	TF: Brazil	TF: Brazil
April 23–26	(Cameroon) Yaoundé	African Championships	TF: Egypt; AA: (Egypt) Omar Mohamed; FX: (South Africa) Daniel McLean; PH: (Egypt) Mohamed Afify; SR: (Egypt) Omar Mohamed; VT: (Morocco) Hamza Hossaini; PB: (Egypt) Omar Mohamed; HB: (Egypt) Omar Mohamed	TF: Algeria; AA: (Algeria) Kaylia Nemour; VT: (Algeria) Djenna Laroui; UB: (Algeria) Kaylia Nemour; BB: (Algeria) Kaylia Nemour; FX: (Algeria) Kaylia Nemour
May 7–10	(Bulgaria) Varna	FIG World Challenge Cup	FX: (Belgium) Victor Tournicourt; PH: (Bulgaria) David Ivanov; SR: (Armenia) Artur Avetisyan; VT: (Malaysia) Ng Chun Chen; PB: (Turkey) Altan Doğan; HB: (Bulgaria) Daniel Trifonov	VT: (Netherlands) Mara Slippens; UB: (Israel) Roni Shamay; BB: (Poland) Maria Drobniak; FX: (United Kingdom) Shantae-Eve Amankwaah
May 8–9	(Australia) Brisbane	Oceania Championships	TF: Australia; AA: (Australia) Jesse Moore	TF: Australia; AA: (Australia) Emily Whitehead
May 21–24	(Uzbekistan) Tashkent	FIG World Challenge Cup	FX: (Kazakhstan) Emil Akhmejanov; PH: (Bulgaria) Rayan Radkov; SR: (Uzbekistan) Akhrorkhon Temirkhonov; VT: (Bulgaria) Daniel Trifonov; PB: (Bulgaria) Yordan Aleksandrov; HB: (Uzbekistan) Alisher Boysarov	VT: (Vietnam) Nguyễn Thị Quỳnh Như; UB: (Switzerland) Lena Bickel; BB: (Kazakhstan) Evelina Yezhova; FX: (Switzerland) Lena Bickel
May 28–31	(Slovenia) Koper	FIG World Challenge Cup	FX: (Italy) Lorenzo Minh Casali; PH: (Croatia) Mateo Zugec; SR: (Ukraine) Bohdan Suprun; VT: (Italy) Simone Speranza; PB: (Israel) Ron Pyatov; HB: (Italy) Riccardo Villa	VT: (Slovenia) Teja Belak; UB: (Hungary) Zsófia Kovács; BB: (Romania) Alexia Blanaru; FX: (Israel) Lihie Raz
June 17–21	(Brazil) Rio de Janeiro	Pan American Championships	TF: Canada; AA: (Colombia) Camilo Vera; FX: (Guatemala) Jorge Vega; PH: (United States) Patrick Hoopes; SR: (Canada) William Émard; VT: (Colombia) Camilo Vera; PB: (United States) Yul Moldauer; HB: (Colombia) Ángel Barajas	TF: United States; AA: (United States) Claire Pease; VT: (Brazil) Rebeca Andrade; UB: (Canada) Aurélie Tran; BB: (Argentina) Isabella Ajalla; FX: (United States) Claire Pease
June 18–21	(China) Zunyi	Asian Championships	TF: China; AA: (China) Zhang Boheng; FX: (Philippines) Carlos Yulo; PH: (Uzbekistan) Utkirbek Juraev; SR: (China) Yang Haonan; VT: (Japan) Wataru Tanigawa; PB: (China) Zhang Boheng; HB: (Chinese Taipei) Tang Chia-hung	—N/a
June 25–28	(China) Zunyi	Asian Championships	—N/a	TF: China; AA: (China) Ke Qinqin; VT: (South Korea) Yeo Seo-jeong; UB: (China) Qiu Qiyuan; BB: (China) Zhang Qingying; FX: (China) Zhang Yihan
July 24–28	(Scotland) Glasgow	Commonwealth Games	TF: Canada; AA: (Scotland) Reuben Ward; FX: (England) Luke Whitehouse; PH: (Canada) Jordan Carroll; SR: (Canada) Félix Dolci; VT: (Canada) Félix Dolci; PB: (Australia) Jesse Moore; HB: (Canada) Félix Dolci	TF: Australia; AA: (Canada) Ellie Black; VT: (Canada) Lia Monica Fontaine; UB: (Australia) Kate McDonald; BB: (Australia) Breanna Scott; FX: (Wales) Ruby Evans
August 2–6	(Dominican Republic) Santo Domingo	Central American and Caribbean Games	TF: Colombia; AA: (Colombia) Ángel Barajas; FX: (Guatemala) Jorge Vega; PH: (Puerto Rico) Nelson Guilbe; SR: (Puerto Rico) Francisco Vélez; VT: (Guatemala) Jorge Vega; PB: (Colombia) Ángel Barajas; HB: (Colombia) Ángel Barajas	TF: Mexico; AA: (Mexico) Natalia Escalera; VT: (Mexico) Natalia Escalera; UB: (Mexico) Victoria Mata; BB: (Panama) Alyiah Lide de León; FX: (Panama) Alyiah Lide de León
August 13–16	(Croatia) Zagreb	European Championships	—N/a	TF: World Gymnastics 2 AA: Angelina Melnikova; VT: Angelina Melnikova; UB: (Germany) Helen Kevric; BB: (France) Elena Colas; FX: (Italy) Manila Esposito
August 19–23	(Croatia) Zagreb	European Championships	TF: Great Britain; AA: (Croatia) Illia Kovtun; FX: (Israel) Artem Dolgopyat; PH: (Italy) Gabriele Targhetta; SR: (Armenia) Artur Avetisyan; VT: (Ukraine) Nazar Chepurnyi; PB: (Croatia) Illia Kovtun; HB: (United Kingdom) Joe Fraser	—N/a
August 30–September 2	(Italy) Taranto	Mediterranean Games	TF: Turkey; AA: (Cyprus) Marios Georgiou; FX: (Greece) Antonios Tantalidis; PH: (Spain) Ignacio Yockers; SR: (Turkey) Mehmet Ayberk Koşak; VT: (Morocco) Hamza Hossaini; PB: (Turkey) Altan Doğan; HB: (Cyprus) Marios Georgiou	TF: Italy; AA: (Algeria) Kaylia Nemour; VT: (Italy) Benedetta Gava; UB: (Algeria) Kaylia Nemour; BB: (Algeria) Kaylia Nemour; FX: (Italy) Benedetta Gava
September 13–16	(Argentina) Rosario	South American Games	TF: Brazil; AA: (Colombia) Thomas Mejía; FX: (Colombia) Thomas Mejía; PH: (Colombia) Ángel Barajas; SR: (Chile) Joaquín Álvarez; VT: (Brazil) Yuri Guimarães; PB: (Colombia) Ángel Barajas; HB: (Colombia) Ángel Barajas	TF: Argentina; AA: (Argentina) Julieta Lucas; VT: (Argentina) Emilia Acosta; UB: (Argentina) Julieta Lucas; BB: (Brazil) Gabriela Bouças; FX: (Argentina) Julieta Lucas
September 18–20	(Hungary) Szombathely	FIG World Challenge Cup	FX: (Croatia) Aurel Benović; PH: (Kazakhstan) Zeinolla Idrissov; SR: (Ukraine) Stasis Butrimas; VT: (Bulgaria) Daniel Trifonov; PB: (Bulgaria) Yordan Aleksandrov; HB: (Brazil) Arthur Mariano	VT: (Hungary) Gréta Mayer; UB: (Brazil) Flávia Saraiva; BB: (Brazil) Flávia Saraiva; FX: (United States) Dulcy Caylor
September 21–25	(Japan) Nagoya	Asian Games	TF: China; AA: (China) Zhang Boheng; FX: (Philippines) Carlos Yulo; PH: (Uzbekistan) Utkirbek Juraev; SR: (China) Lan Xingyu; VT: (Philippines) Carlos Yulo; PB: (China) Zou Jingyuan; HB: (China) Tian Hao	TF: China; AA: (Japan) Aiko Sugihara; VT: (South Korea) Yeo Seo-jeong; UB: (China) Qiu Qiyuan; BB: (South Korea) Hwang Seo-hyun; FX: (Japan) Aiko Sugihara
September 26–27	(France) Paris	FIG World Challenge Cup	FX: (Israel) Artem Dolgopyat; PH: (Armenia) Hamlet Manukyan; SR: Ilia Zaika; VT: (Ukraine) Nazar Chepurnyi; PB: (Turkey) Ferhat Arıcan; HB: (United States) Cooper Kim	VT: (Belgium) Lisa Vaelen; UB : (France) Elena Colas; BB: (Belgium) Naomi Descamps; FX: (France) Maïana Prat
October 17–25	(Netherlands) Rotterdam	World Championships	TF: Japan; AA: (Japan) Daiki Hashimoto; FX: (United States) Frederick Richard; PH: (Armenia) Hamlet Manukyan; SR: (China) Lan Xingyu; VT: (Armenia) Artur Davtyan; PB: (China) Zou Jingyuan; HB: (Chinese Taipei) Tang Chia-hung	TF: China; AA: (United States) Skye Blakely; VT: (Brazil) Rebeca Andrade; UB: (Algeria) Kaylia Nemour; BB: (Algeria) Kaylia Nemour; FX: (United States) Claire Pease
November 7–11	(Senegal) Dakar	Youth Olympic Games	TF: China; AA: (Russia) Daniil Smirnov	TF: China; AA: (Russia) Polina Dmitrieva
November 7–11	(Senegal) Dakar	Youth Olympic Games	Mixed Team: China	

== Medalists ==
=== Women ===
==== International events ====
Competition	Event	Gold	Silver	Bronze
World Championships	Team	China	United States	Japan
World Championships	All-Around	(United States) Skye Blakely	(Russia) Liudmila Roshchina	(China) Ke Qinqin
World Championships	Vault	(Brazil) Rebeca Andrade	(United States) Claire Pease	(United States) Skye Blakely
World Championships	Uneven Bars	(Algeria) Kaylia Nemour	(Germany) Helen Kevric	(United States) Skye Blakely
World Championships	Balance Beam	(Algeria) Kaylia Nemour	(China) Zhang Qingying	(Brazil) Flávia Saraiva
World Championships	Floor Exercise	(United States) Claire Pease	(United States) Reese Esponda	(France) Maïana Prat
Youth Olympic Games	Team	China	Japan	France
Youth Olympic Games	All-Around	(Russia) Polina Dmitrieva	(France) Louane Plisson	(China) Zhong Qi

==== Regional championships ====
Competition	Event	Gold	Silver	Bronze
African	Team	Algeria	South Africa	Egypt
African	All-Around	(Algeria) Kaylia Nemour	(South Africa) Caitlin Rooskrantz	(Algeria) Djenna Laroui
African	Vault	(Algeria) Djenna Laroui	(South Africa) Buhle Nhleko	(Egypt) Sirine Abouelhoda
African	Uneven Bars	(Algeria) Kaylia Nemour	(South Africa) Caitlin Rooskrantz	(Algeria) Djenna Laroui
African	Balance Beam	(Algeria) Kaylia Nemour	(Algeria) Djenna Laroui	(Egypt) Jana Abdelsalam
African	Floor Exercise	(Algeria) Kaylia Nemour	(Morocco) Salina Bousmayou	(Egypt) Sirine Abouelhoda
Asian	Team	China	Japan	South Korea
Asian	All-Around	(China) Ke Qinqin	(China) Zhang Qingying	(Japan) Misa Nishiyama
Asian	Vault	(South Korea) Yeo Seo-jeong	(North Korea) An Chang-ok	(Japan) Shoko Miyata
Asian	Uneven Bars	(China) Qiu Qiyuan	(China) Du Siyu	(Japan) Misa Nishiyama
Asian	Balance Beam	(China) Zhang Qingying	(China) Ke Qinqin	(South Korea) Hwang Seo-hyun
Asian	Floor Exercise	(China) Zhang Yihan	(Japan) Aiko Sugihara	(China) Zhang Qingying
European	Team	World Gymnastics 2	Italy	France
European	All-Around	Angelina Melnikova	Anna Kalmykova	(France) Elena Colas
European	Vault	Angelina Melnikova	(Germany) Karina Schönmaier	(Belgium) Lisa Vaelen
European	Uneven Bars	(Germany) Helen Kevric	(Italy) Elisa Iorio	(Italy) Giulia Perotti
European	Balance Beam	(France) Elena Colas	(Italy) Manila Esposito	Angelina Melnikova
European	Floor Exercise	(Italy) Manila Esposito	(France) Elena Colas	Angelina Melnikova
Oceania	Team	Australia	New Zealand	—N/a
Oceania	All-Around	(Australia) Emily Whitehead	(Australia) Lucy Stewart	(New Zealand) Jun McDonald
Pan American	Team	United States	Brazil	Canada
Pan American	All-Around	(United States) Claire Pease	(United States) Charleigh Bullock	(Brazil) Thaís Fidélis
Pan American	Vault	(Brazil) Rebeca Andrade	(Canada) Lia Monica Fontaine	(United States) Claire Pease
Pan American	Uneven Bars	(Canada) Aurélie Tran	(United States) Simone Rose	(Brazil) Sophia Weisberg
Pan American	Balance Beam	(Argentina) Isabella Ajalla	(United States) Simone Rose	(Brazil) Thaís Fidélis
Pan American	Floor Exercise	(United States) Claire Pease	(Canada) Lia Redick	(Argentina) Isabella Ajalla

=== Men ===
==== International events ====
Competition	Event	Gold	Silver	Bronze
World Championships	Team	Japan	Russia	China
World Championships	All-Around	(Japan) Daiki Hashimoto	(China) Yang Haonan	(United Kingdom) Joe Fraser
World Championships	Floor Exercise	(United States) Frederick Richard	(United Kingdom) Jake Jarman	(Israel) Artem Dolgopyat
World Championships	Pommel Horse	(Armenia) Hamlet Manukyan	(Italy) Gabriele Targhetta	(Armenia) Mamikon Khachatryan
World Championships	Rings	(China) Lan Xingyu	(Greece) Eleftherios Petrounias	(Armenia) Artur Avetisyan
World Championships	Vault	(Armenia) Artur Davtyan	(United Kingdom) Jake Jarman	(Norway) Sebastian Sponevik
World Championships	Parallel Bars	(China) Zou Jingyuan	(Croatia) Illia Kovtun	(Russia) Daniel Marinov
World Championships	Horizontal Bar	(Chinese Taipei) Tang Chia-hung	(Japan) Shinnosuke Oka	(Russia) Sergei Naidin
Youth Olympic Games	Team	China	Japan	Great Britain
Youth Olympic Games	All-Around	(Russia) Daniil Smirnov	(United Kingdom) Uzair Chowdhury	(Japan) Ikki Nishihara

==== Regional championships ====
Competition	Event	Gold	Silver	Bronze
African	Team	Egypt	Algeria	South Africa
African	All-Around	(Egypt) Omar Mohamed	(Egypt) Mohamed Afify	(Algeria) Adam Cogat
African	Floor Exercise	(South Africa) Daniel McLean	(Algeria) Adam Cogat	(Egypt) Mohamed Afify
African	Pommel Horse	(Egypt) Mohamed Afify	(Egypt) Omar Elshobki	(Algeria) Youcef Semmani
African	Rings	(Egypt) Omar Mohamed	(Algeria) Houssem Hamadouche	(Egypt) Omar Elshobki
African	Vault	(Morocco) Hamza Hossaini	(Egypt) Mostafa Ahmed	(Tunisia) Ahmed Labidi
African	Parallel Bars	(Egypt) Omar Mohamed	(Algeria) Adam Cogat	(Morocco) Hamza Hossaini
African	Horizontal Bar	(Egypt) Omar Mohamed	(Algeria) Adam Cogat	(Egypt) Mostafa Ahmed
Asian	Team	China	Japan	South Korea
Asian	All-Around	(China) Zhang Boheng	(China) Yang Haonan	(Japan) Teppei Miwa
Asian	Floor Exercise	(Philippines) Carlos Yulo	(Japan) Shoma Tsukiyama	(Philippines) Eldrew Yulo
Asian	Pommel Horse	(Uzbekistan) Utkirbek Juraev	(China) Zhang Boheng	(Chinese Taipei) Lee Chih-kai
Asian	Rings	(China) Yang Haonan	(China) Zhang Boheng	(Iran) Mehdi Ahmad Kohani
Asian	Vault	(Japan) Wataru Tanigawa	(South Korea) Kim Jae-ho	(Iran) Mahdi Olfati
Asian	Parallel Bars	(China) Zhang Boheng	(South Korea) Ryu Sung-hyun	(Chinese Taipei) Hung Yuan-hsi
Asian	Horizontal Bar	(Chinese Taipei) Tang Chia-hung	(China) Zhang Boheng	(Japan) Fusuke Maeda
European	Team	(United Kingdom) Great Britain	World Gymnastics 2	Switzerland
European	All-Around	(Croatia) Illia Kovtun	Arsenii Dukhno	Daniel Marinov
European	Floor Exercise	(Israel) Artem Dolgopyat	Arsenii Dukhno	(United Kingdom) Harry Hepworth
European	Pommel Horse	(Italy) Gabriele Targhetta	(Armenia) Hamlet Manukyan	(Armenia) Mamikon Khachatryan
European	Rings	(Armenia) Artur Avetisyan	Ilia Zaika	(Greece) Eleftherios Petrounias
European	Vault	(Ukraine) Nazar Chepurnyi	Aleksei Usachev	(United Kingdom) Sol Scott
European	Parallel Bars	(Croatia) Illia Kovtun	(Turkey) Ferhat Arıcan	(United Kingdom) Joe Fraser
European	Horizontal Bar	(United Kingdom) Joe Fraser	(Cyprus) Marios Georgiou	Savelii Sieedin
Oceania	Team	Australia	New Zealand	—N/a
Oceania	All-Around	(Australia) Jesse Moore	(Australia) James Hardy	(Australia) Ritam Malik
Pan American	Team	Canada	Colombia	United States
Pan American	All-Around	(Colombia) Camilo Vera	(Colombia) Ángel Barajas	(United States) Yul Moldauer
Pan American	Floor Exercise	(Guatemala) Jorge Vega	(Colombia) Ángel Barajas	(Brazil) Vitaliy Guimaraes
Pan American	Pommel Horse	(United States) Patrick Hoopes	(Canada) Jordan Carroll	(Colombia) Ángel Barajas
Pan American	Rings	(Canada) William Émard	(Chile) Joaquín Álvarez	(Canada) Félix Dolci
Pan American	Vault	(Colombia) Camilo Vera	(Chile) Josué Armijo	(Puerto Rico) José López
Pan American	Parallel Bars	(United States) Yul Moldauer	(Brazil) Diogo Soares	(Cuba) Diorges Esobar
Pan American	Horizontal Bar	(Colombia) Ángel Barajas	(Brazil) Diogo Soares	(Canada) Félix Dolci (Brazil) Arthur Mariano

== Season's best international scores ==
Note: Only the scores of senior gymnasts from international events have been included below. Only one score per gymnast is included. In May of this year, World Gymnastics lifted all restrictions against Russian and Belarusian athletes. Although at some competitions the local government refused to allow their flags and emblems and they therefore had to compete under the World Gymnastics banner, this list references their country.

=== Women ===
==== All-around ====
Rank	Name	Country	Score	Event
1	Kaylia Nemour	Algeria	57.750	Mediterranean Games AA
2	Ke Qinqin	China	56.299	Asian Championships AA
3	Claire Pease	United States	56.099	World Championships TF
4	Angelina Melnikova	Russia	55.932	European Championships AA
5	Skye Blakely	United States	55.733	World Championships AA
6	Zhang Qingying	China	55.666	Asian Championships AA
7	Elena Colas	France	55.632	European Championships TF
8	Aiko Sugihara	Japan	55.599	Asian Games AA
9	Anna Kalmykova	Russia	55.432	European Championships TF
10	Liudmila Roshchina	Russia	55.199	World Championships AA
11	Misa Nishiyama	Japan	55.032	Asian Games AA
12	Qiu Qiyuan	China	54.399	Asian Games AA
13	Lia Monica Fontaine	Canada	54.233	International Gymnix AA
14	Alba Petisco	Spain	54.198	World Championships AA
15	Charleigh Bullock	United States	54.165	Pan American Championships QF
16	Giulia Perotti	Italy	54.098	World Championships AA
17	Naomi Visser	Netherlands	53.965	World Championships QF
18	Alena Glotova	Russia	53.932	World Championships QF
19	Lia Redick	Canada	53.900	International Gymnix AA
20	Rina Kishi	Japan	53.799	Asian Games AA

==== Vault ====
Rank	Name	Country	Score	Event
1	Rebeca Andrade	Brazil	14.549	Pan American Championships QF
2	Yeo Seo-jeong	South Korea	14.483	Asian Games EF
3	Angelina Melnikova	Russia	14.333	European Championships QF
4	Lia Monica Fontaine	Canada	14.283	International Gymnix EF
4	Claire Pease	United States	14.283	World Championships QF
6	Skye Blakely	United States	14.166	World Championships EF
7	Karina Schönmaier	Germany	14.066	European Championships EF
8	Ming Van Eijken	France	14.017	City of Jesolo Trophy QF
9	Lisa Vaelen	Belgium	13.983	European Championships EF
10	An Chang-ok	North Korea	13.966	Asian Championships QF
10	Ellie Black	Canada	13.966	World Championships EF

==== Uneven bars ====
Rank	Name	Country	Score	Event
1	Kaylia Nemour	Algeria	15.650	Mediterranean Games AA
2	Yang Fanyuwei	China	15.266	Osijek World Cup EF
3	Qiu Qiyuan	China	15.100	Asian Games EF
4	Du Siyu	China	14.866	Asian Games TF
5	Helen Kevric	Germany	14.833	World Championships EF
6	Elena Colas	France	14.600	European Championships TF
6	Skye Blakely	United States	14.600	World Championships EF
8	Elisa Iorio	Italy	14.533	European Championships QF
8	Misa Nishiyama	Japan	14.533	Asian Games QF
10	Naomi Visser	Netherlands	14.466	World Championships QF

==== Balance beam ====
Rank	Name	Country	Score	Event
1	Zhang Qingying	China	15.333	Asian Championships QF
2	Ke Qinqin	China	15.100	Asian Championships EF
3	Qiu Qiyuan	China	14.966	World Championships QF
4	Kaylia Nemour	Algeria	14.933	African Championships QF
5	Mana Okamura	Japan	14.866	Asian Games TF
6	Hwang Seo-hyun	South Korea	14.733	Asian Championships EF
7	Pak Un-jong	North Korea	14.566	Asian Games TF
8	Flávia Saraiva	Brazil	14.400	World Championships QF
9	Zhang Xinyi	China	14.300	City of Jesolo Trophy TF
10	Aiko Sugihara	Japan	14.266	Asian Games QF

==== Floor exercise ====
Rank	Name	Country	Score	Event
1	Zhang Yihan	China	14.066	Asian Championships EF
2	Aiko Sugihara	Japan	14.033	Asian Games EF
3	Lia Monica Fontaine	Canada	13.933	International Gymnix AA
3	Claire Pease	United States	13.933	World Championships TF
5	Misa Nishiyama	Japan	13.900	Asian Games EF
6	Rina Kishi	Japan	13.866	Asian Games TF
7	Angelina Melnikova	Russia	13.800	European Championships QF
8	Maïana Prat	France	13.766	Paris World Challenge Cup EF
9	Reese Esponda	United States	13.700	City of Jesolo Trophy TF
9	Manila Esposito	Italy	13.700	European Championships EF

=== Men ===
==== All-around ====
Rank	Name	Country	Score	Event
1	Daiki Hashimoto	Japan	86.831	Asian Games TF
2	Zhang Boheng	China	85.298	Asian Championships AA
3	Shinnosuke Oka	Japan	85.098	World Championships QF
4	Yang Haonan	China	84.199	World Championships AA
5	Arsenii Dukhno	Russia	83.932	World Championships TF
6	Shohei Kawakami	Japan	83.699	World Championships QF
7	Jake Jarman	Great Britain	83.698	World Championships QF
8	Joe Fraser	Great Britain	83.531	World Championships AA
9	Ángel Barajas	Colombia	83.432	World Championships TF
10	Sun Wei	China	83.298	Asian Games AA
11	Daniel Marinov	Russia	83.297	World Championships AA
12	Illia Kovtun	Croatia	83.099	World Championships QF
13	Camilo Vera	Colombia	82.764	World Championships QF
14	Nao Ojima	Japan	82.350	DTB Pokal Team Challenge
15	Teppei Miwa	Japan	82.265	Asian Championships AA
16	Yul Moldauer	United States	82.250	DTB Pokal Team Challenge
17	Fred Richard	United States	82.165	World Championships AA
18	Noe Seifert	Switzerland	82.050	DTB Pokal Team Challenge
19	Shoma Tsukiyama	Japan	81.897	Asian Games AA
20	Carlos Yulo	Philippines	81.864	Asian Championships AA

==== Floor exercise ====
Rank	Name	Country	Score	Event
1	Arsenii Dukhno	Russia	14.833	European Championships QF
2	Artem Dolgopyat	Israel	14.766	European Championships QF
3	Carlos Yulo	Philippines	14.700	Asian Championships EF
4	Fred Richard	United States	14.633	World Championships EF
5	Shoma Tsukiyama	Japan	14.600	Asian Championships EF
5	Milad Karimi	Kazakhstan	14.600	Asian Games EF
5	Jake Jarman	Great Britain	14.600	World Championships EF
8	Luke Whitehouse	Great Britain	14.566	Commonwealth Games EF
8	Ryu Sung-hyun	South Korea	14.566	Asian Games QF
10	Yahor Sharamkou	Belarus	14.533	Baku World Cup EF

==== Pommel horse ====
Rank	Name	Country	Score	Event
1	Hamlet Manukyan	Armenia	15.300	World Championships EF
2	Gabriele Targhetta	Italy	15.233	World Championships EF
3	Jordan Carroll	Canada	15.000	Commonwealth Games EF
3	Mamikon Khachatryan	Armenia	15.000	World Championships EF
4	Reuben Ward	Great Britain	14.966	Commonwealth Games EF
6	Nariman Kurbanov	Kazakhstan	14.933	Cottbus World Cup EF
6	Patrick Hoopes	United States	14.933	World Championships EF
8	Zeinolla Idrissov	Kazakhstan	14.833	Cottbus World Cup EF
8	Hur Woong	South Korea	14.833	World Championships EF
10	Utkirbek Juraev	Uzbekistan	14.733	Asian Games EF
10	Kilan van der Aa	Belgium	14.733	World Championships EF

==== Rings ====
Rank	Name	Country	Score	Event
1	Lan Xingyu	China	15.200	Asian Games QF
2	Kiichi Kaneta	Japan	14.900	Asian Games TF
3	Zhang Boheng	China	14.666	Asian Games TF
3	Harry Hepworth	Great Britain	14.666	World Championships TF
5	Ilia Zaika	Russia	14.600	Baku World Cup EF
5	Zou Jingyuan	China	14.600	Asian Games EF
7	Yang Haonan	China	14.566	Asian Championships EF
8	Adem Asil	Turkey	14.533	Antalya World Cup EF
8	Artur Avetisyan	Armenia	14.533	Paris World Challenge Cup EF
10	Courtney Tulloch	Great Britain	14.500	World Championships QF

==== Vault ====
Rank	Name	Country	Score	Event
1	Artur Davtyan	Armenia	14.850	World Championships EF
2	Nazar Chepurnyi	Ukraine	14.716	Cottbus World Cup EF
3	Jake Jarman	Great Britain	14.650	World Championships EF
4	Harry Hepworth	Great Britain	14.616	Osijek World Cup EF
5	Carlos Yulo	Philippines	14.599	Asian Games EF
6	Mahdi Olfati	Iran	14.533	Asian Games EF
7	Aleksei Usachev	Russia	14.399	European Championships EF
8	Sebastian Sponevik	Norway	14.366	World Championships EF
9	Arsenii Dukhno	Russia	14.350	World Championships QF
10	Wataru Tanigawa	Japan	14.316	Asian Championships EF

==== Parallel bars ====
Rank	Name	Country	Score	Event
1	Zou Jingyuan	China	15.733	World Championships EF
2	Zhang Boheng	China	14.933	Asian Championships EF
3	Illia Kovtun	Croatia	14.900	World Championships QF
4	Shohei Kawakami	Japan	14.866	Cottbus World Cup EF
4	Ángel Barajas	Colombia	14.866	Osijek World Cup EF
4	Shinnosuke Oka	Japan	14.866	World Championships QF
4	Daniel Marinov	Russia	14.866	World Championships EF
8	Daiki Hashimoto	Japan	14.800	World Championships QF
9	Liu Yang	China	14.666	Cairo World Cup QF
10	Yul Moldauer	United States	14.650	DTB Pokal TF

==== Horizontal bar ====
Rank	Name	Country	Score	Event
1	Tang Chia-hung	Chinese Taipei	15.500	Asian Championships EF
2	Ángel Barajas	Colombia	15.300	Cottbus World Cup QF
3	Daiki Hashimoto	Japan	15.233	Asian Games TF
4	Milad Karimi	Kazakhstan	15.033	Baku World Cup EF
5	Zhang Boheng	China	15.000	Asian Championships EF
6	Shohei Kawakami	Japan	14.966	Cottbus World Cup EF
7	Tomoharu Tsunogai	Japan	14.900	American Cup TF
7	Fusuke Maeda	Japan	14.900	Asian Championships QF
9	Li Hongyan	China	14.800	American Cup TF
9	Carlo Macchini	Italy	14.800	Paris World Challenge Cup QF
9	Shinnosuke Oka	Japan	14.800	World Championships EF
9	Sergei Naidin	Russia	14.800	World Championships EF
