= Gymnastics at the 2026 Asian Games – Men's horizontal bar =

Men's horizontal bar at the 2026 Asian Games
- Venue: Nippon Gaishi Hall Rainbow Hall
- Date: 21 September 2026 (Qualification); 25 September 2026 (Final)
- Competitors: 8 from 5 nations

Medalists
gold medal	Tian Hao	China
silver medal	Shinnosuke Oka	Japan
bronze medal	Eldrew Yulo	Philippines

The men's horizontal bar competition at the 2026 Asian Games will take place on 25 September 2026 at Nippon Gaishi Hall Rainbow Hall.

== Schedule ==
All times are Japan Standard Time (UTC+09:00)

Date	Time	Event
Monday, 21 September 2026	10:00	Qualification
Friday, 25 September 2026	18:40	Final

== Qualification ==
Rank	Gymnast	D Score	E Score	Pen.	Bon.	Total	Qual.
1	Tian Hao (CHN)	5.9	8.533			14.433	Q
2	Shoma Tsukiyama (JPN)	5.8	8.466			14.266	Q
3	Shinnosuke Oka (JPN)	5.4	8.833			14.233	Q
4	Tang Chia-hung (TPE)	6.3	7.766			14.166	Q
5	Zhang Boheng (CHN)	5.8	8.233			14.033	~~Q~~ WD
6	Daiki Hashimoto (JPN)	5.7	8.233		0.1	14.033	–
7	Sun Wei (CHN)	5.4	8.533			13.933	–
8	Ryu Sung-hyun (KOR)	5.2	8.333			13.533	Q
9	Eldrew Yulo (PHI)	5.2	8.333			13.533	Q
10	Tomoharu Tsunogai (JPN)	6.0	7.433			13.433	–
11	Milad Karimi (KAZ)	5.8	7.333			13.133	Q
12	Mohammadreza Hamidi (IRI)	4.4	8.333		0.1	12.833	R1 Sub
13	Lee Chih-kai (TPE)	4.4	8.400			12.800	R2
13	Kim Jae-ho (KOR)	5.0	7.800			12.800	R3

== Final ==
Rank	Gymnast	D Score	E Score	Pen.	Bon.	Total
1st place, gold medalist(s)	Tian Hao (CHN)	5.9	8.700		0.1	14.700
2nd place, silver medalist(s)	Shinnosuke Oka (JPN)	5.4	8.633			14.033
3rd place, bronze medalist(s)	Eldrew Yulo (PHI)	5.0	8.566		0.1	13.666
4	Milad Karimi (KAZ)	5.8	7.766		0.1	13.666
5	Tang Chia-hung (TPE)	5.9	7.566			13.466
6	Mohammadreza Hamidi (IRI)	4.7	7.966			12.666
7	Ryu Sung-hyun (KOR)	5.2	7.333			12.533
8	Shoma Tsukiyama (JPN)	5.1	5.666			10.766
