= Gymnastics at the 2026 Asian Games – Men's floor =

Men's floor at the 2026 Asian Games
- Venue: Nippon Gaishi Hall Rainbow Hall
- Date: 21 September 2026 (Qualification); 24 September 2026 (Final)
- Competitors: 8 from 5 nations

Medalists
| gold medal | Carlos Yulo | Philippines |
| silver medal | Milad Karimi | Kazakhstan |
| bronze medal | Shoma Tsukiyama | Japan |

The men's floor competition at the 2026 Asian Games took place on 24 September 2026 at Nippon Gaishi Hall Rainbow Hall.

== Schedule ==
All times are Japan Standard Time (UTC+09:00)

| Date | Time | Event |
|---|---|---|
| Monday, 21 September 2026 | 10:00 | Qualification |
| Thursday, 24 September 2026 | 17:00 | Final |

== Qualification ==
| Rank | Gymnast | D Score | E Score | Pen. | Bon. | Total | Qual. |
|---|---|---|---|---|---|---|---|
| 1 | Carlos Yulo (PHI) | 5.7 | 8.900 | | | 14.600 | Q |
| 2 | Ryu Sung-hyun (KOR) | 5.8 | 8.766 | | | 14.566 | Q |
| 3 | Shoma Tsukiyama (JPN) | 5.6 | 8.566 | | | 14.166 | Q |
| 4 | Eldrew Yulo (PHI) | 5.4 | 8.566 | | | 13.966 | Q |
| 5 | Sun Wei (CHN) | 5.3 | 8.600 | | | 13.900 | Q |
| 6 | Shinnosuke Oka (JPN) | 5.3 | 8.533 | | | 13.833 | ~~Q~~ WD |
| 7 | Milad Karimi (KAZ) | 5.3 | 8.533 | | | 13.833 | Q |
| 8 | Zhang Boheng (CHN) | 5.2 | 8.600 | | | 13.800 | ~~Q~~ WD |
| 9 | Kim Jae-ho (KOR) | 4.9 | 8.766 | | 0.1 | 13.766 | R1 Sub |
| 10 | Daiki Hashimoto (JPN) | 5.4 | 8.333 | -0.3 | | 13.433 | – Sub |
| 11 | Usukhbayar Erkhembayar (MGL) | 5.2 | 8.233 | -0.1 | 0.1 | 13.433 | R2 |
| 12 | Miguel Besana (PHI) | 4.8 | 8.333 | | | 13.133 | – |
| 13 | Dmitriy Patanin (KAZ) | 5.4 | 7.633 | | 0.1 | 13.133 | R3 |

== Final ==
| Rank | Gymnast | D Score | E Score | Pen. | Bon. | Total |
|---|---|---|---|---|---|---|
| 1st place, gold medalist(s) | Carlos Yulo (PHI) | 5.7 | 8.966 | | | 14.666 |
| 2nd place, silver medalist(s) | Milad Karimi (KAZ) | 5.7 | 8.800 | | 0.1 | 14.600 |
| 3rd place, bronze medalist(s) | Shoma Tsukiyama (JPN) | 5.6 | 8.866 | | 0.1 | 14.566 |
| 4 | Ryu Sung-hyun (KOR) | 5.8 | 8.566 | | | 14.366 |
| 5 | Kim Jae-ho (KOR) | 4.9 | 8.700 | | | 13.600 |
| 6 | Daiki Hashimoto (JPN) | 5.4 | 8.000 | | 0.1 | 13.500 |
| 7 | Eldrew Yulo (PHI) | 5.3 | 6.933 | | | 12.233 |
| 8 | Sun Wei (CHN) | 5.1 | 5.666 | 0.2 | | 10.566 |
