= Gymnastics at the 2022 Asian Games – Men's artistic individual all-around =

Men's individual all-around at the 2022 Asian Games
- Venue: Huanglong Gymnasium
- Date: 24–26 September 2023
- Competitors: 25 from 11 nations

Medalists
gold medal	Zhang Boheng	China
silver medal	Takeru Kitazono	Japan
bronze medal	Lan Xingyu	China

The men's artistic individual all-around competition at the 2022 Asian Games was held on 26 September 2023 at the Huanglong Sports Centre Gymnasium.

== Schedule ==
All times are China Standard Time (UTC+08:00)

Date	Time	Event
Sunday, 24 September 2023	10:00	Qualification
Tuesday, 26 September 2023	15:00	Final

== Results ==
Legend

- DNF — Did not finish
- DNS — Did not start

=== Qualification ===
Rank	Athlete	Floor (gymnastics)	Pommel horse	Rings (gymnastics)	Vault (gymnastics)	Parallel bars	Horizontal bar	Total
1	Zhang Boheng (CHN)	14.933	14.333	14.700	14.866	15.466	14.266	88.564
2	Shohei Kawakami (JPN)	14.466	14.000	13.100	14.100	14.533	14.233	84.432
3	Takeru Kitazono (JPN)	13.800	13.266	13.666	14.600	15.133	12.766	83.231
4	Yun Jin-seong (KOR)	13.533	13.200	13.133	13.966	14.133	13.300	81.265
5	Lan Xingyu (CHN)	12.433	12.000	14.966	14.400	14.000	13.366	81.165
6	Bae Ga-ram (KOR)	12.233	13.400	12.466	14.033	14.133	13.400	79.665
7	Yeh Cheng (TPE)	13.466	13.266	12.900	14.200	12.500	11.933	78.265
8	Ravshan Kamiljanov (UZB)	13.466	13.633	11.033	13.300	12.800	12.133	76.365
9	Ri Wi-chol (PRK)	12.400	10.366	12.600	13.666	14.433	12.366	75.831
10	Mohammad Reza Khosronejad (IRI)	13.233	11.066	12.933	12.866	13.466	12.200	75.764
11	Roman Mamenov (KAZ)	11.433	12.400	12.433	13.900	13.433	11.833	75.432
12	Mohammad Reza Hamidi (IRI)	13.033	12.333	11.100	12.733	12.933	12.666	74.798
13	Alisher Toibazarov (KAZ)	13.000	11.766	12.166	13.766	11.933	11.266	73.897
14	Pak Song-hyok (PRK)	11.333	12.333	13.500	10.600	13.366	10.833	71.965
15	Asadbek Azamov (UZB)	13.266	6.066	13.166	14.133	12.866	12.266	71.763
16	Suphacheep Baobenmad (THA)	11.600	10.000	11.766	13.900	12.266	11.766	71.298
17	Nadila Nethviru (SRI)	11.866	10.266	10.866	13.433	12.800	10.733	69.964
18	Phạm Phước Hiếu (VIE)	11.566	7.600	9.166	13.633	12.966	12.000	66.931
19	Ittirit Kumsiriratn (THA)	12.700	9.600	11.666	13.566	11.466	7.366	66.364
20	Emil Akhmejanov (KAZ)	2.100	11.433	12.200	14.266	12.933	12.600	65.532
21	Witsawayot Saroj (THA)	11.400	3.500	11.700	0.000	11.700	10.466	48.766
—	Kim Han-sol (KOR)	14.433	12.800	DNS	13.200	13.766	DNS	DNF
—	Jong Ryong-il (PRK)	2.233	DNS	14.433	10.666	7.200	7.600	DNF
—	Mehdi Ahmadkohani (IRI)	DNS	DNS	13.400	DNS	DNS	DNS	DNF
—	Mehdi Olfati (IRI)	DNS	DNS	DNS	14.866	DNS	DNS	DNF

=== Final ===
Rank	Athlete	Floor (gymnastics)	Pommel horse	Rings (gymnastics)	Vault (gymnastics)	Parallel bars	Horizontal bar	Total
1st place, gold medalist(s)	Zhang Boheng (CHN)	14.500	14.600	14.933	14.600	15.466	15.200	89.299
2nd place, silver medalist(s)	Takeru Kitazono (JPN)	14.400	14.600	13.866	14.433	15.300	14.433	87.032
3rd place, bronze medalist(s)	Lan Xingyu (CHN)	13.600	13.700	15.266	14.500	14.533	13.366	84.965
4	Shohei Kawakami (JPN)	13.700	12.866	13.500	12.600	14.666	14.500	81.832
5	Bae Ga-ram (KOR)	13.500	12.300	12.833	12.666	14.333	12.233	77.865
6	Asadbek Azamov (UZB)	13.333	11.633	13.533	13.966	12.566	12.166	77.197
7	Mohammad Reza Khosronejad (IRI)	12.666	12.233	13.266	12.833	13.666	12.066	76.730
8	Ravshan Kamiljanov (UZB)	13.100	12.833	12.266	13.300	12.566	12.600	76.665
9	Yun Jin-seong (KOR)	13.100	10.666	12.666	13.900	14.266	11.733	76.331
10	Mohammad Reza Hamidi (IRI)	12.966	11.300	12.533	12.900	13.000	12.833	75.532
11	Yeh Cheng (TPE)	11.933	10.933	13.100	13.533	13.466	12.366	75.331
12	Alisher Toibazarov (KAZ)	12.966	10.966	12.533	13.366	12.933	12.566	75.330
13	Roman Mamenov (KAZ)	11.366	10.833	13.033	13.700	13.200	13.000	75.132
14	Ri Wi-chol (PRK)	11.800	11.966	13.033	13.366	12.766	11.766	74.697
15	Phạm Phước Hiếu (VIE)	12.733	11.333	11.700	13.833	12.933	10.866	73.398
16	Suphacheep Baobenmad (THA)	12.866	10.300	11.633	13.566	12.166	12.866	73.397
17	Nadila Nethviru (SRI)	12.033	10.100	10.333	13.500	12.833	12.266	71.065
18	Ittirit Kumsiriratn (THA)	11.400	7.500	12.466	13.566	12.233	7.733	64.898
