= Tsuyoshi Hasegawa (gymnast) =

Japanese artistic gymnast

- Full name: 長谷川 毅
- Born: 20 March 2001 (age 25)

Gymnastics career
- Discipline: Men's artistic gymnastics
- Country represented: Japan
- College team: NIFS Kanoya
- Club: NIFS Kanoya
Medal record
Representing Japan
Asian Championships
| Gold medal – first place | 2025 Jecheon | Team |
| Silver medal – second place | 2022 Doha | Team |
| Silver medal – second place | 2022 Doha | Parallel bars |
| Silver medal – second place | 2025 Jecheon | All-around |
| Silver medal – second place | 2026 Zunyi | Team |
World University Games
| Gold medal – first place | 2025 Rhine-Ruhr | Team |

Tsuyoshi Hasegawa (長谷川 毅, Hasegawa Tsuyoshi; born 20 March 2001) is a Japanese artistic gymnast.

== Competitive history ==
| Year | Event | Team | AA | FX | PH | SR | VT | PB | HB |
|---|---|---|---|---|---|---|---|---|---|
| 2021 | All Japan Championships | 4 | 15 | | 10 | | | 15 | |
| 2021 | NHK Trophy | | 17 | | | | | | |
| 2021 | All Japan Student Championships | 2nd place, silver medalist(s) | 20 | | | | | 5 | |
2022
| 2022 | Asian Championships | 2nd place, silver medalist(s) | | | | | | | |
| 2023 | DTB Pokal Team Challenge | 2nd place, silver medalist(s) | | | | | | | |
2025
| 2025 | Asian Championships | 1st place, gold medalist(s) | 2nd place, silver medalist(s) | | | | | | |
| 2025 | World University Games | 1st place, gold medalist(s) | | | | | | | |
2026
| 2026 | Asian Championships | 2nd place, silver medalist(s) | | | | | | | |

== Detailed results ==
| Year | Tournament | Event | Date | All Around | Floor (gymnastics) | Pommel horse | Rings (gymnastics) | Vault (gymnastics) | Parallel bars | Horizontal bar |
|---|---|---|---|---|---|---|---|---|---|---|
| 2021 | All Japan Individual All-around Championships | Qualification | 16 April | 82.532 | 13.866 | 14.200 | 13.100 | 13.600 | 14.366 | 13.400 |
| 2021 | All Japan Individual All-around Championships | AA Final | 18 April | 83.631 | 14.033 | 14.366 | 13.333 | 14.000 | 14.166 | 13.733 |
| 2021 | NHK Trophy | | 16 May | 82.932 | 14.000 | 14.233 | 13.733 | 13.900 | 13.266 | 13.800 |
| 2021 | All Japan Individual Events Championships | Qualification | 5 June | | | 14.400 | | | 14.333 | |
| 2021 | All Japan Student Championships | | 01 - 4 September | 80.266 | 13.800 | 13.100 | 13.133 | 13.600 | 14.333 | 12.300 |
| 2021 | All Japan Team Championship | | 12 December | | | 14.033 | 13.866 | | 14.333 | 14.166 |

== See also ==
- Japan men's national gymnastics team
