= Gymnastics at the 2026 Asian Games =

- Venue: Nippon Gaishi Hall Rainbow Hall
- Dates: 21 September – 3 October 2026
- Competitors: 215 from 27 nations

The gymnastics competitions at the 2026 Asian Games are being held between 21 September and 3 October 2026 at the Nippon Gaishi Hall Rainbow Hall. It is being contested in three categories: artistic gymnastics, rhythmic gymnastics and trampolining.

== Schedule ==
The schedule is as follows:

Q	Qualification	F	Final

Event↓/Date →	21st Mon	22nd Tue	23rd Wed	24th Thu	25th Fri	26th Sat	27th Sun		28th Mon	29th Tue	30th Wed	1st Thu	2nd Fri	3rd Sat
Artistic
Men's team all-around	Q		F											
Men's individual all-around	F													
Men's floor	Q			F										
Men's pommel horse	Q			F										
Men's rings	Q			F										
Men's vault	Q				F									
Men's parallel bars	Q				F									
Men's horizontal bar	Q				F									
Women's team all-around		Q	F											
Women's individual all-around		F												
Women's vault		Q		F										
Women's uneven bars		Q		F										
Women's balance beam		Q			F									
Women's floor		Q			F									
Rhythmic
Women's group all-around													Q	F
Women's individual all-around												Q		F
Trampoline
Men's trampoline							Q	F						
Women's trampoline							Q	F						

== Medal summary ==
=== Medal table ===
* Host nation (Japan)

Rank	Nation	Gold	Silver	Bronze	Total
1	China	9	4	6	19
2	Japan*	3	10	5	18
3	Philippines	2	0	1	3
3	Uzbekistan	2	0	1	3
5	South Korea	2	0	0	2
6	Iran	0	2	0	2
7	Kazakhstan	0	1	2	3
8	North Korea	0	1	1	2
9	Chinese Taipei	0	0	1	1
9	Hong Kong	0	0	1	1
Totals (10 entries)		18	18	18	54

=== Medalists ===
==== Artistic gymnastics ====
===== Men's events =====
Event	Gold	Silver	Bronze
Team all-around	China; Lan Xingyu; Sun Wei; Tian Hao; Zhang Boheng; Zou Jingyuan; Dou Wantao	Japan; Daiki Hashimoto; Kiichi Kaneta; Shinnosuke Oka; Shoma Tsukiyama; Tomoharu Tsunogai; Teppei Shimowada	Chinese Taipei; Chuang Chia-lung; Hung Yuan-hsi; Lee Chih-kai; Shiao Yu-jan; Tang Chia-hung; Chong Il-woo
Individual all-around	Zhang Boheng; China	Shinnosuke Oka; Japan	Daiki Hashimoto; Japan
Floor exercise	Carlos Yulo; Philippines	Milad Karimi; Kazakhstan	Shoma Tsukiyama; Japan
Pommel horse	Utkirbek Juraev; Uzbekistan	Arman Khodaei; Iran	Daiki Hashimoto; Japan
Rings	Lan Xingyu; China	Kiichi Kaneta; Japan	Zou Jingyuan; China
Vault	Carlos Yulo; Philippines	Mahdi Olfati; Iran	Ng Ka Ki; Hong Kong
Parallel bars	Zou Jingyuan; China	Shinnosuke Oka; Japan	Rasuljon Abdurakhimov; Uzbekistan
Horizontal bar	Tian Hao; China	Shinnosuke Oka; Japan	Eldrew Yulo; Philippines

===== Women's events =====
Event	Gold	Silver	Bronze
Team all-around	China; Du Siyu; Ke Qinqin; Qiu Qiyuan; Zhang Qingying; Zhang Yihan; Qin Xinyi	Japan; Rina Kishi; Haruka Nakamura; Misa Nishiyama; Mana Okamura; Aiko Sugihara; Marie Enomoto	North Korea; An Chang-ok; Han Yon-mi; Jo Kyong-byol; Kim Kyong-ryong; Pak Un-jong; Ryu Seung-ok
Individual all-around	Aiko Sugihara; Japan	Ke Qinqin; China	Misa Nishiyama; Japan
Vault	Yeo Seo-jeong; South Korea	An Chang-ok; North Korea	Du Siyu; China
Uneven bars	Qiu Qiyuan; China	Misa Nishiyama; Japan	Zhang Qingying; China
Balance beam	Hwang Seo-hyun; South Korea	Qiu Qiyuan; China	Mana Okamura; Japan
Floor exercise	Aiko Sugihara; Japan	Misa Nishiyama; Japan	Zhang Yihan; China

==== Rhythmic gymnastics ====
Event	Gold	Silver	Bronze
Group all-around	China; Ding Xinyi; Liu Miaoting; Pu Yanzhu; Wang Lanjing; Zhang Xinyi	Japan; Natsumi Hanamura; Megumi Nishimoto; Hisano Taguchi; Kaseno Tanabe; Yuna Tanaka	Kazakhstan; Kristina Chepulskaya; Jasmine Junusbayeva; Aida Khakimzhanova; Madina Myrzabay; Aizere Nurmagambetova
Individual all-around	Takhmina Ikromova; Uzbekistan	Wang Qi; China	Wang Zilu; China

==== Trampoline ====
Event	Gold	Silver	Bronze
Men's individual	Yan Langyu; China	Wang Zisai; China	Yerlan Tasmagambetov; Kazakhstan
Women's individual	Hikaru Mori; Japan	Megu Uyama; Japan	Qiu Zheng; China

== Participating nations ==
- Bangladesh (1)
- China (21)
- Chinese Taipei (15)
- Hong Kong (8)
- Indonesia (2)
- India (1)
- Iran (10)
- Japan (21)
- Jordan (1)
- Kazakhstan (19)
- Kyrgyzstan (8)
- Laos (1)
- Lebanon (1)
- Malaysia (11)
- Mongolia (2)
- Myanmar (1)
- North Korea (5)
- Philippines (14)
- Qatar (3)
- Singapore (17)
- South Korea (17)
- Sri Lanka (2)
- Syria (2)
- Tajikistan (1)
- Thailand (8)
- Uzbekistan (15)
- Vietnam (8)
