= Li Hongyan (gymnast) =

Chinese artistic gymnast

- 李鸿颜
- Born: February 24, 2003 (age 23)

Gymnastics career
- Discipline: Men's artistic gymnastics
- Country represented: China
Medal record
Representing China
World Championships
Bronze medal – third place	2026 Rotterdam	Team
Asian Championships
Gold medal – first place	2026 Zunyi	Team

Li Hongyan (simplified Chinese: 李鸿颜; traditional Chinese: 李鴻顏; pinyin: Lǐ Hóngyán; born 2003) is a Chinese artistic gymnast. As part of the national team, he won gold at the 2026 Asian Championships in Zunyi, China, and bronze at the 2026 World Championships in Rotterdam, Netherlands.

== Competitive history ==
Year	Event	Team	AA	FX	PH	SR	VT	PB	HB
2026	World Championships	3rd place, bronze medalist(s)							
