= Park Seung-ho =

South Korean politician

Member of the Interim Legislative Assembly
- In office 1946–1948

Park Seung-ho (Korean: 박승호) was a South Korean politician. In 1946 she was one of the four women who were appointed to the Interim Legislative Assembly, becoming South Korea's first female legislators.

== Biography ==
Following the end of World War II, the United States Army Military Government established an Interim Legislative Assembly with 90 members; 45 elected and 45 appointed by Military Governor John R. Hodge. Although women were unable to vote in the election, Hodge appointed four women, including Park, who was a member of the Patriotic Women's Association.
