= Eldrew Yulo =

Filipino artistic gymnast (born 2008)

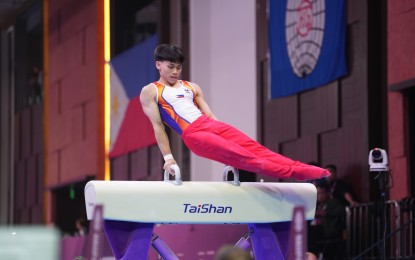
- Yulo in 2025

Personal information
- Full name: Karl Jahrel Eldrew Poquiz Yulo
- Born: January 24, 2008 (age 18) Manila, Philippines
- Relatives: Carlos Yulo (brother)

Gymnastics career
- Discipline: Men's artistic gymnastics
- Country represented: Philippines; (2023–present)
- Training location: Tokyo, Japan
- Head coach: Reyland Capellan
Medal record
Representing Philippines
Asian Games
| Bronze medal – third place | 2026 Aichi-Nagoya | Horizontal bar |
Asian Championships
| Bronze medal – third place | 2026 Zunyi | Floor exercise |
Junior World Championships
| Bronze medal – third place | 2025 Manila | Floor exercise |
| Bronze medal – third place | 2025 Manila | Horizontal bar |
Junior Asian Championships
| Gold medal – first place | 2024 Tashkent | Vault |
| Silver medal – second place | 2023 Singapore | Vault |
| Silver medal – second place | 2025 Jecheon | Vault |
FIG World Cup
| Event | 1st | 2nd | 3rd |
|---|---|---|---|
| Apparatus World Cup | 1 | 0 | 2 |
| Total | 1 | 0 | 2 |

Karl Jahrel Eldrew Poquiz Yulo (born January 24, 2008) is a Filipino artistic gymnast. He was the junior Asian champion in vault in 2024, and is a silver medalist in the same apparatus in 2023. He is also the 2025 Junior World Championships bronze medalist in floor exercise and horizontal bar.

== Early life and education ==
Karl Jahrel Eldrew Yulo was born on January 24, 2008, in Manila, Philippines. He attended his primary education at Aurora A. Quezon Elementary School and is currently studying at Adamson University for his secondary education.

== Gymnastics career ==
=== Junior ===
Yulo competed at the 2023 Asian Junior Artistic Gymnastics Championships in Singapore, which marked his international competition debut, and advanced to the finals in two apparatus— vault and floor exercise. He won the silver in vault, behind Wang Chengcheng of China.

Yulo also competed at the Palarong Pambansa, representing the National Capital Region. At the 2023 Palaro, he won the gold in the all-around and all six events in the secondary boys' artistic gymnastics category.

In 2024, Yulo improved his silver in vault to a gold at the 2024 Junior Asian Championships. In April, he competed at the junior division of the 2024 Pacific Rim Championships. Yulo finished second and won the silver medal in the all-around. He won gold medals on floor exercise and vault, and silver medals on pommel horse and rings. For the parallel bars and horizontal bar, Yulo finished at 6th.

He won a vault silver at the 2025 Junior Asian Championships, while also reaching the finals for three other apparatus: floor exercise, pommel horse, and horizontal bar.

Yulo won bronze medals on the floor exercise and horizontal bar at the 2025 Junior World Championships, while placing 8th and 4th in the all-around and vault, respectively. He is the first Filipino gymnast to medal in the Junior Worlds and the first Filipino player to perform the "Cassina 1" on horizontal bar.

=== Senior ===
In November 2025, Yulo announced that he would start to compete in the seniors and focus on making the national team beginning in 2026.

In March 2026, for his senior debut, Yulo made it to the finals of Baku World Cup for floor exercise and horizontal bar. He then placed 6th and 7th on the floor exercise and horizontal bar, respectively. In the same month, Yulo made it to the finals of Antalya World Cup for floor exercise and won the gold. In April, he made it to the finals of Cairo World Cup for floor exercise and horizontal bar, in which Yulo won bronze for both apparatus. In the same month, he made it to the finals of Osijek World Cup for floor exercise and horizontal bar. Yulo then placed 7th and 8th on the floor exercise and horizontal bar, respectively. In June, he competed with his older brother Carlos at the 2026 Senior Asian Championships in Zunyi. For the floor exercise, the younger Yulo won a bronze medal while his brother won the gold. He then placed 4th on the horizontal bar. In September, Yulo made it to the finals of the 2026 Asian Games in Aichi-Nagoya for floor exercise and horizontal bar. He then placed 7th for all-around, with Philippines placing 6th for team, and won bronze for horizontal bar.

== Personal life ==
Yulo's older brother, Carlos, is a three-time World and two-time Olympic champion. His sister Elaiza, the youngest among the siblings, is also an artistic gymnast.

== Competitive history ==
Competitive history of Eldrew Yulo at the junior level
| Year | Event | Team | AA | FX | PH | SR | VT | PB | HB |
2023
| 2023 | Asian Championships | | 9 | 7 | | | 2nd place, silver medalist(s) | | |
2024
| 2024 | Asian Championships | | 17 | | | | 1st place, gold medalist(s) | | |
| 2024 | Pacific Rim Championships | | 2nd place, silver medalist(s) | 1st place, gold medalist(s) | 2nd place, silver medalist(s) | 2nd place, silver medalist(s) | 1st place, gold medalist(s) | 6 | 6 |
2025
| 2025 | Asian Championships | | 7 | 6 | 4 | | 2nd place, silver medalist(s) | | 8 |
| 2025 | World Championships | | 8 | 3rd place, bronze medalist(s) | | | 4 | | 3rd place, bronze medalist(s) |

Competitive history of Eldrew Yulo at the senior level
| Year | Event | Team | AA | FX | PH | SR | VT | PB | HB |
|---|---|---|---|---|---|---|---|---|---|
| 2026 | Baku World Cup | | | 6 | | | | | 7 |
| 2026 | Antalya World Cup | | | 1st place, gold medalist(s) | | | | | |
| 2026 | Cairo World Cup | | | 3rd place, bronze medalist(s) | | | | | 3rd place, bronze medalist(s) |
| 2026 | Osijek World Cup | | | 7 | | | | | 8 |
| 2026 | Asian Championships | 7 | 13 | 3rd place, bronze medalist(s) | | | | | 4 |
| 2026 | Asian Games | 6 | 7 | 7 | | | | | 3rd place, bronze medalist(s) |
| 2026 | World Championships | | 99 | | | | | | |

== Awards ==
Name of the award ceremony, year presented, award category, and the result of the nomination
| Award ceremony | Year | Category | Result | Ref. |
|---|---|---|---|---|
| PSA Annual Awards | 2023 | Tony Siddayao Award for Junior Athlete – Gymnastics | Honored | |
| PSA Annual Awards | 2024 | Tony Siddayao Award for Junior Athlete – Gymnastics | Honored | |
| PSA Annual Awards | 2025 | Special citation – Gymnastics | Honored | |
| PSA Annual Awards | 2026 | Tony Siddayao Award for Junior Athlete – Gymnastics | Honored | |
| Siklab Sports Youth Awards | 2018 | PSC Children's Games for Peace Award | Honored | |
| Siklab Sports Youth Awards | 2023 | Go for Gold Young Heroes Award | Honored | |
| Siklab Sports Youth Awards | 2024 | Youth Heroes Award | Honored | |
| Siklab Sports Youth Awards | 2025 | Youth Heroes Award | Honored | |
