= Ryu Sung-hyun =

South Korean gymnast (born 2002)

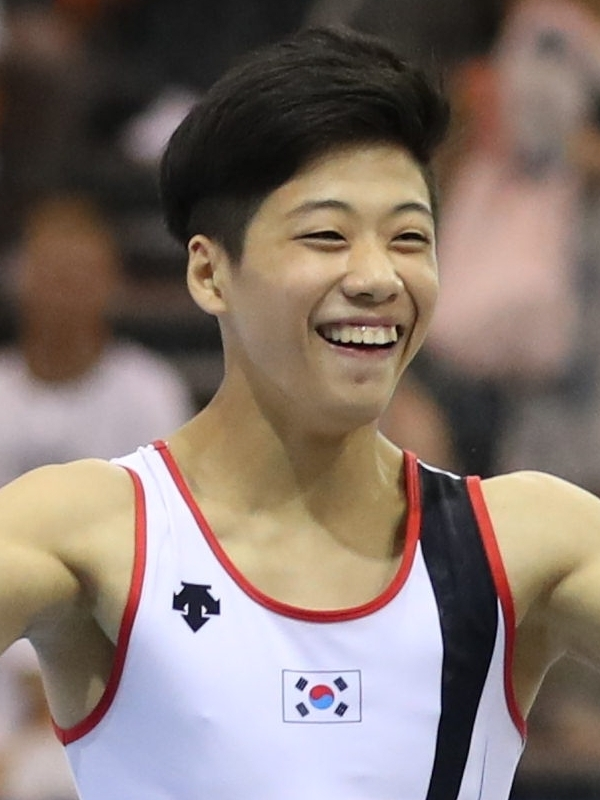
- Ryu at the 2019 Junior World Championships

Personal information
- Nickname: Gibbon
- Born: 22 October 2002 (age 23) Seoul, South Korea
- Height: 163 cm (5 ft 4 in)

Gymnastics career
- Discipline: Men's artistic gymnastics
- Club: Korea National Sport University
- Head coach: Jo Seong-Min
Medal record
Men's artistic gymnastics
Representing South Korea
Asian Championships
Silver medal – second place	2026 Zunyi	Parallel Bars
Bronze medal – third place	2026 Zunyi	Team
World University Games
Bronze medal – third place	2021 Chengdu	Team
Bronze medal – third place	2021 Chengdu	Floor exercise
Junior World Championships
Gold medal – first place	2019 Győr	Floor exercise
FIG World Cup
Event / 1st / 2nd / 3rd; Apparatus World Cup / 2 / 0 / 1

Ryu Sung-hyun (Korean: 류성현; born 22 October 2002) is a South Korean artistic gymnast. He is the 2019 Junior World champion on the floor exercise. He represented South Korea at the 2020 and 2024 Olympic Games. He won two bronze medals at the 2021 World University Games.

== Early life ==
Ryu was born in 2002 in Seoul. When he was eight years old, he stayed after school to watch his school's gymnastics practices. His father, a former football player, did not want him to become an athlete and would not let him join the team. He began practicing gymnastics alone for four years, and the team coach eventually contacted and convinced his parents to let him join the team.

== Career ==
=== 2019 ===
Ryu made his international debut at the 2019 Junior World Championships. He helped the South Korean team place sixth, and he qualified for the floor exercise final in first place. He then won the gold medal in the final ahead of Félix Dolci and Nazar Chepurnyi.

=== 2020–2021 ===
In 2020, Ryu won the gold medal in the floor exercise at the Melbourne World Cup. Then at the Baku World Cup, he finished fourth on the floor exercise during the qualification round. However, the event finals were canceled due to the COVID-19 pandemic.

Ryu won the all-around competition at South Korea's Olympic Trials and was selected to represent South Korea at the 2020 Summer Olympics alongside Kim Han-sol, Lee Jun-ho, and Yang Hak-seon. At the Olympic Games, the team placed 11th during the qualification round. Individually, Ryu qualified for the floor exercise final in third place. During the final, he competed with the highest difficulty score in the field, but mistakes on the landings caused him to finish in fourth place. After the Olympic Games, he competed at the World Championships and once again finished fourth on the floor exercise.

=== 2022 ===
Ryu began the 2022 season with a fifth-place finish on the floor exercise at the Doha World Cup. Then at the Asian Championships, he helped the South Korean team place fourth, and he placed sixth in the all-around. In the event finals, he placed fifth on the floor exercise and seventh on the rings and horizontal bar. He then competed at the 2022 World Championships where the South Korean team placed eighth in the team final. He qualified for the all-around final, but he chose to withdraw to focus on the event finals. Individually, he finished sixth in the floor exercise final.

=== 2023 ===
At the 2023 Asian Championships, Ryu placed fourth with the South Korean team. Individually, he finished seventh in the all-around and floor exercise and fourth on the parallel bars. He then represented South Korea at the 2021 Summer World University Games, which were held in 2023 due to the COVID-19 pandemic, and he helped the team win the bronze medal. Individually, he finished seventh in the all-around, fifth on the parallel bars, and won the bronze medal on the floor exercise. During the 2023 World Championships, Ryu fractured his left clavicle. The South Korean team finished 13th during the qualification round and did not qualify as a full team for the 2024 Olympic Games.

=== 2024 ===
Ryu registered for the 2024 FIG World Cup series to earn an individual berth for the 2024 Olympic Games, despite not being fully recovered from his injury. In the first event in Cairo, he won the gold medal on the floor exercise. Then at the Cottbus World Cup, he won the bronze medal behind Harry Hepworth and Artem Dolgopyat. Although he only finished fifth in Baku, he mathematically secured an Olympic berth prior to the final event in Doha. His Olympic qualification was officially confirmed after the Doha World Cup, and he was the overall floor exercise champion of the World Cup series.

== Personal life ==
Since 2021, Ryu has studied physical education at the Korea National Sport University (KNSU). At the 2024 Summer Olympics, he will become the first athlete to compete at two Olympic Games as a KNSU student.

== Competitive history ==
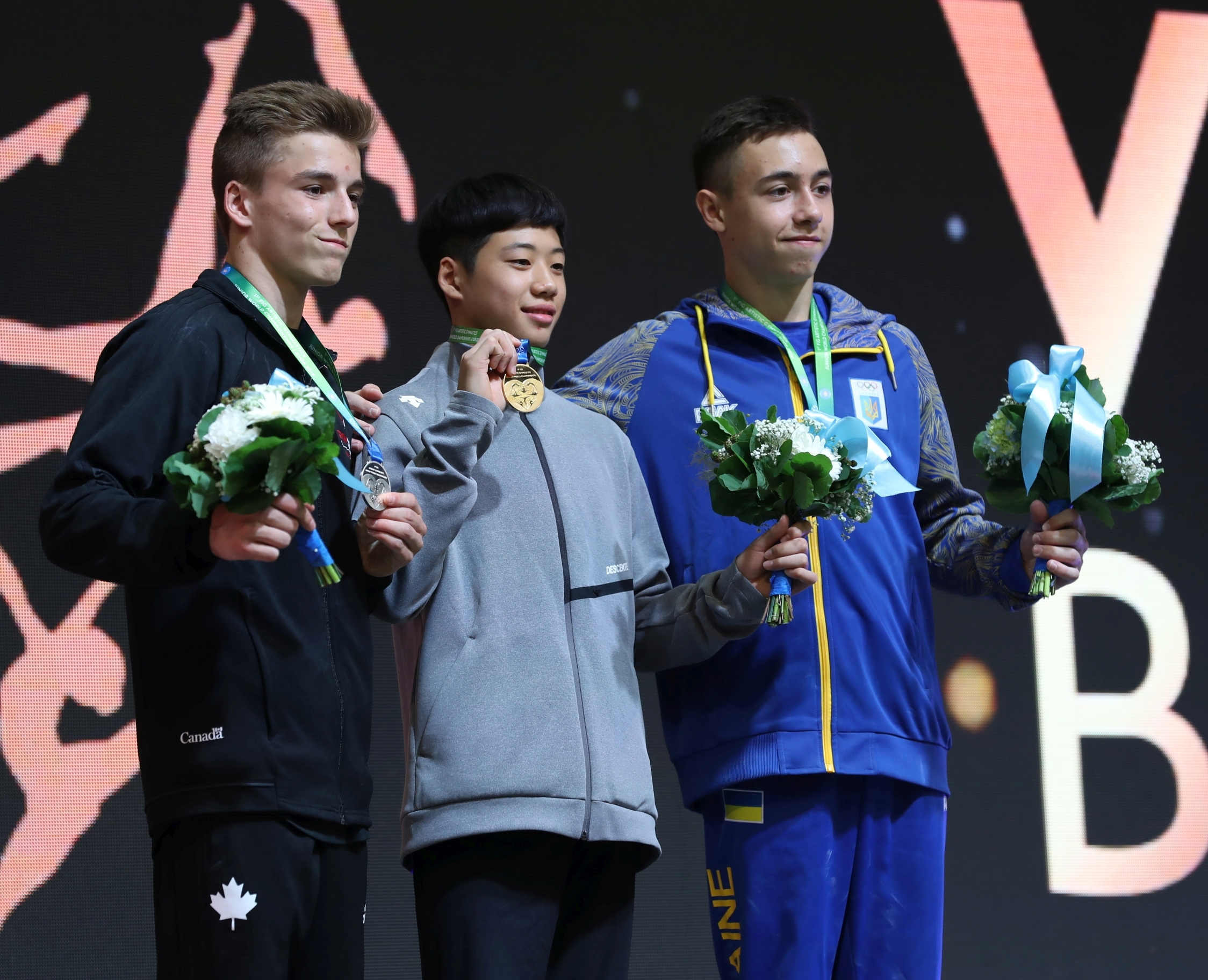
Ryu (center) at the 2019 Junior World Championships

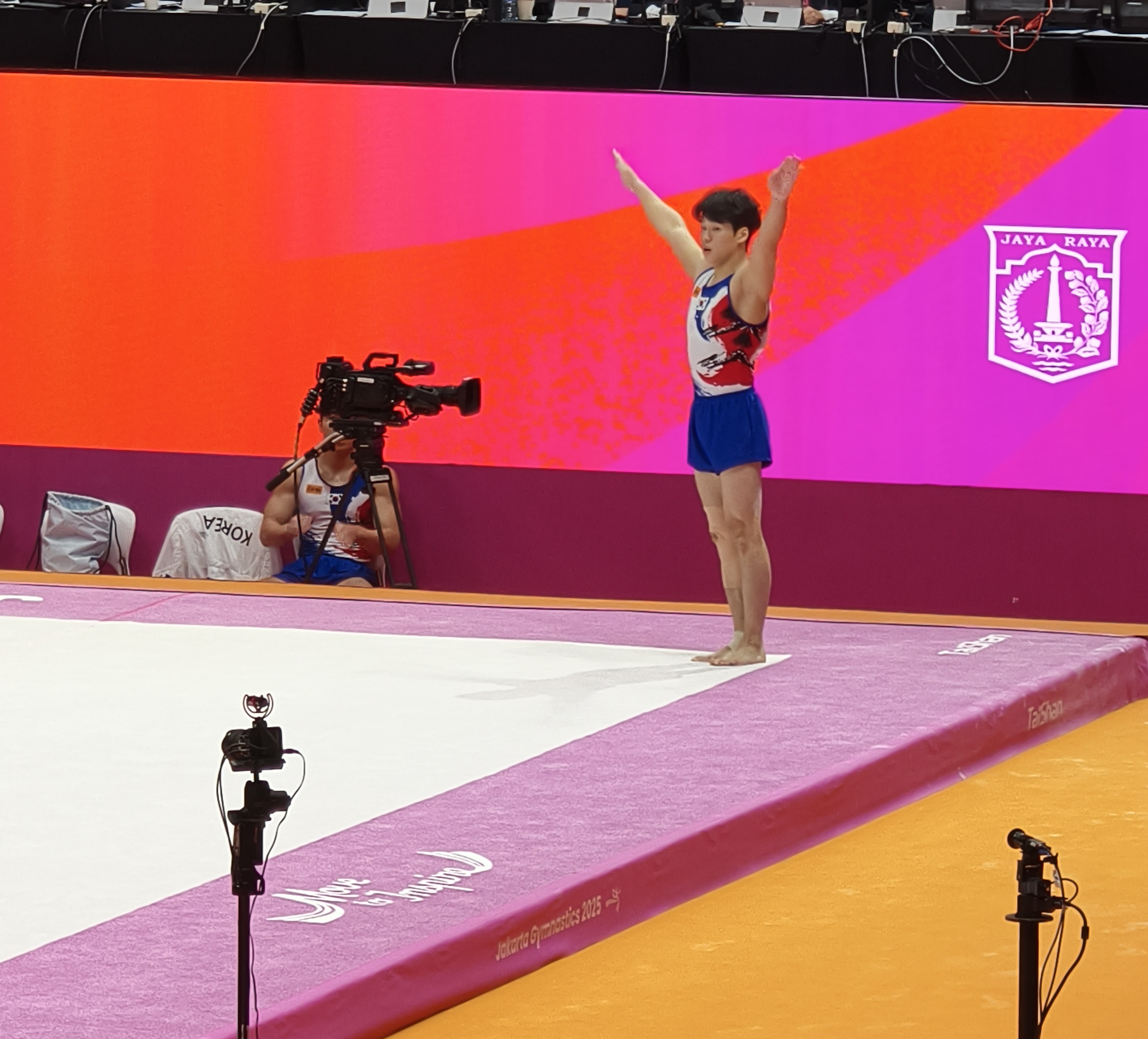
Ryu competing floor exercise at the 2025 World Championships

Year	Event	Team	AA	FX	PH	SR	VT	PB	HB
Junior
2019
2019	Junior World Championships	6		1st place, gold medalist(s)					
Senior
2020	Melbourne World Cup			1st place, gold medalist(s)					
2020	Baku World Cup			4					
2021	Olympic Trials		1st place, gold medalist(s)						
2021	Olympic Games	11		4					
2021	World Championships			4					
2022	Doha World Cup			5					
2022	Asian Championships	4	6	5		7			7
2022	World Championships	8	WD	6					
2023
2023	Asian Championships	4	7	7				4	
2023	World University Games	3rd place, bronze medalist(s)	7	3rd place, bronze medalist(s)				5	
2023	World Championships	13							
2024	Cairo World Cup			1st place, gold medalist(s)					
2024	Cottbus World Cup			3rd place, bronze medalist(s)					
2024	Baku World Cup			5					
2024	Olympic Games			R2					
2025
2025	World Championships		13	R2					
2026
2026	Asian Championships	3rd place, bronze medalist(s)	6					2nd place, silver medalist(s)	
2026	Asian Games	5		4					7
