= 2024 Asian Men's Artistic Gymnastics Championships =

Gymnastics event in Uzbekistan

2024 Asian Artistic Gymnastics Championships
- Venue: Gymnastics Sport Palace
- Location: Tashkent, Uzbekistan
- Start date: 16 May 2024
- End date: 19 May 2024

The 2024 Asian Men's Artistic Gymnastics Championships were the 11th edition of the Asian Artistic Gymnastics Championships, held in Tashkent, Uzbekistan from 16 to 19 May 2024.

The event served as a qualification event for the 2024 Olympics Games in Paris.

== Participating countries ==
- Bangladesh
- China
- Hong Kong
- India
- Iran
- Jordan
- Kazakhstan
- Kyrgyzstan
- Malaysia
- Mongolia
- North Korea
- Philippines
- Qatar
- Saudi Arabia
- South Korea
- Singapore
- Sri Lanka
- Syria
- Thailand
- Chinese Taipei
- Uzbekistan
- Vietnam

== Medal summary ==
Event	Gold	Silver	Bronze
Senior
Team all-around	China; Yin Dehang; Tian Hao; Xie Chenyi; Yang Yanzhi; Liao Jialei	Uzbekistan; Abdulla Azimov; Utkirbek Juraev; Abdulaziz Mirvaliev; Rasuljon Abdurakhimov; Khabibullo Ergashev	South Korea; Park Seung-ho; Kim Jae-ho; Moon Geon-yong; Lee Jang-won; Hur Woong
Individual all-around	(Philippines) Carlos Yulo	(Kazakhstan) Milad Karimi	(Uzbekistan) Abdulla Azimov
Floor exercise	(Philippines) Carlos Yulo	(Kazakhstan) Milad Karimi	(China) Yang Yanzhi
Pommel horse	(Kazakhstan) Nariman Kurbanov	(Uzbekistan) Abdulla Azimov	(Jordan) Ahmad Abu Al-Soud
Rings	(China) Yin Dehang	(Vietnam) Nguyễn Văn Khánh Phong (China) Yang Yanzhi	None awarded
Vault	(Philippines) Carlos Yulo	(Uzbekistan) Abdulaziz Mirvaliev	(Malaysia) Muhammad Sharul Aimy
Parallel bars	(Philippines) Carlos Yulo	(China) Yin Dehang	(Uzbekistan) Rasuljon Abdurakhimov
Horizontal bar	(Kazakhstan) Milad Karimi	(China) Tian Hao	(China) Liao Jialei
Junior
Team all-around	China; Hong Yanming; Zheng Ao; Wang Chengcheng; Yang Lanbin	Japan; Yusei Yoshida; Harutoshi Ochiai; Ryokei Takahashi; Eiju Yasui	Kazakhstan; Altynkhan Temirbek; Nurtan Idrissov; Roman Khegay; Artyom Kovalyov
Individual all-around	(China) Hong Yanming	(China) Yang Lanbin	(Japan) Ryokei Takahashi
Floor exercise	(Kazakhstan) Roman Khegay (Japan) Ryokei Takahashi	None awarded	(Kazakhstan) Nurtan Idrissov
Pommel horse	(China) Hong Yanming	(China) Wang Chengcheng	(Iran) Abolfazl Nikkhoo
Rings	(Iran) Abolfazl Nikkhoo	(Kazakhstan) Nurtan Idrissov	(Japan) Ryokei Takahashi
Vault	(Philippines) Eldrew Yulo	(Kazakhstan) Altynkhan Temirbek	(Uzbekistan) Sarvar Abulfaizov
Parallel bars	(China) Yang Lanbin	(China) Zheng Ao	(Singapore) Jovi Loh
Horizontal bar	(Japan) Eijun Yasui	(China) Yang Lanbin	(Iran) Abolfazl Nikkhoo

== Medal table ==
=== Overall ===
* Host nation (Uzbekistan)

Rank	Nation	Gold	Silver	Bronze	Total
1	China	6	7	2	15
2	Philippines	5	0	0	5
3	Kazakhstan	3	4	2	9
4	Japan	2	1	2	5
5	Iran	1	0	2	3
6	Uzbekistan*	0	3	3	6
7	Vietnam	0	1	0	1
8	Jordan	0	0	1	1
8	Malaysia	0	0	1	1
8	Singapore	0	0	1	1
8	South Korea	0	0	1	1
Totals (11 entries)		17	16	15	48

=== Senior ===
* Host nation (Uzbekistan)

Rank	Nation	Gold	Silver	Bronze	Total
1	Philippines	4	0	0	4
2	China	2	3	2	7
3	Kazakhstan	2	2	0	4
4	Uzbekistan*	0	3	2	5
5	Vietnam	0	1	0	1
6	Jordan	0	0	1	1
6	Malaysia	0	0	1	1
6	South Korea	0	0	1	1
Totals (8 entries)		8	9	7	24

=== Junior ===
* Host nation (Uzbekistan)

Rank	Nation	Gold	Silver	Bronze	Total
1	China	4	4	0	8
2	Japan	2	1	2	5
3	Kazakhstan	1	2	2	5
4	Iran	1	0	2	3
5	Philippines	1	0	0	1
6	Singapore	0	0	1	1
6	Uzbekistan*	0	0	1	1
Totals (7 entries)		9	7	8	24

== Senior results ==
=== Individual all-around ===
Rank	Gymnast	Floor (gymnastics)	Pommel horse	Rings (gymnastics)	Vault (gymnastics)	Parallel bars	Horizontal bar	Total
1st place, gold medalist(s)	(Philippines) Carlos Yulo	15.233	12.866	14.033	15.433	14.233	13.500	85.298
2nd place, silver medalist(s)	(Kazakhstan) Milad Karimi	14.700	13.600	13.266	14.600	13.933	14.533	84.632
3rd place, bronze medalist(s)	(Uzbekistan) Abdulla Azimov	13.733	14.566	12.766	14.033	13.933	13.400	82.431
4	(China) Yin Dehang	13.766	13.866	13.866	13.533	14.266	12.766	82.063
5	(Uzbekistan) Utkirbek Juraev	14.133	13.300	12.733	14.000	14.100	13.633	81.899
6	(China) Tian Hao	12.466	13.833	13.133	14.333	13.100	14.633	81.498
7	(South Korea) Park Seung-ho	13.133	13.000	13.333	14.066	13.466	13.700	80.698
8	(South Korea) Kim Jae-ho	13.466	13.033	12.933	14.166	13.500	13.433	80.531

=== Floor ===
Rank	Gymnast	D Score	E Score	Pen.	Total
1st place, gold medalist(s)	(Philippines) Carlos Yulo	6.600	8.333	0.000	14.933
2nd place, silver medalist(s)	(Kazakhstan) Milad Karimi	6.300	8.400	-0.100	14.600
3rd place, bronze medalist(s)	(China) Yang Yanzhi	6.100	8.100	0.000	14.200
4	(Philippines) John Ivan Cruz	5.900	8.066	0.000	13.966
5	(Kazakhstan) Dmitriy Patanin	5.900	8.266	-0.300	13.866
6	(Uzbekistan) Abdulaziz Mirvaliev	5.600	8.166	0.000	13.766
7	(Uzbekistan) Utkirbek Juraev	5.400	7.900	-0.300	13.000
8	(Mongolia) Usukhbayar Erkhembayar	5.400	7.833	-0.500	12.733

=== Pommel horse ===
Rank	Gymnast	D Score	E Score	Pen.	Total
1st place, gold medalist(s)	(Kazakhstan) Nariman Kurbanov	6.700	8.900	0.000	15.600
2nd place, silver medalist(s)	(Uzbekistan) Abdulla Azimov	6.100	8.533	0.000	14.633
3rd place, bronze medalist(s)	(Jordan) Ahmad Abu Al-Soud	6.300	8.333	0.000	14.633
4	(Vietnam) Dang Ngoc Xuan Thien	6.200	8.333	0.000	14.533
5	(China) Tian Hao	6.000	8.134	0.000	14.133
6	(Jordan) Ahmad Habeeb	5.500	8.333	0.000	13.833
7	(Kazakhstan) Milad Karimi	5.800	7.566	0.000	13.366
8	(China) Yin Dehang	6.400	6.300	0.000	12.700

=== Rings ===
Rank	Gymnast	D Score	E Score	Pen.	Total
1st place, gold medalist(s)	(China) Yin Dehang	5.800	8.400	0.000	14.200
2nd place, silver medalist(s)	(Vietnam) Nguyen Van Khanh Phong	5.900	8.266	0.000	14.166
2nd place, silver medalist(s)	(China) Yang Yanzhi	5.900	8.266	0.000	14.166
4	(Chinese Taipei) Lin Guan-yi	5.900	8.100	0.000	14.000
5	(Iran) Mohammadreza Khosronezhad	5.600	8.133	0.000	13.733
6	(Philippines) Carlos Yulo	5.600	7.933	0.000	13.533
7	(Malaysia) Ally Hamuda Abdullah	5.500	7.733	0.000	13.233
8	(South Korea) Lee Jang-won	5.300	7.233	-0.300	12.233

=== Vault ===
Rank	Gymnast	Vault 1				Vault 2				Total
Rank	Gymnast	D Score	E Score	Pen.	Score 1	D Score	E Score	Pen.	Score 2	Total
1st place, gold medalist(s)	(Philippines) Carlos Yulo	6.000	9.233	0.000	15.233	5.600	8.933	0.000	14.533	14.883
2nd place, silver medalist(s)	(Uzbekistan) Abdulaziz Mirvaliev	5.200	9.333	0.000	14.533	5.600	9.433	0.000	15.033	14.783
3rd place, bronze medalist(s)	(Malaysia) Muhammad Sharul Aimy	5.200	9.233	0.000	14.433	5.200	9.300	0.000	14.500	14.466
4	(Philippines) Juancho Miguel Besana	5.600	9.000	0.000	14.600	5.200	8.600	-0.100	13.700	14.150
5	(South Korea) Moon Geon-yong	5.600	9.300	-0.100	14.900	4.800	7.733	0.000	12.533	13.716
6	(Vietnam) Trinh Hai Khang	5.200	8.133	-0.100	13.233	5.600	8.466	-0.100	13.966	13.599
7	(Hong Kong) Ng Ka Ki	5.600	8.466	-0.100	13.966	5.600	7.533	0.000	13.133	13.549
8	(Malaysia) Ng Chun Chen	5.600	7.800	-0.300	13.100	5.600	7.666	0.000	13.266	13.183

=== Parallel bars ===
Rank	Gymnast	D Score	E Score	Pen.	Total
1st place, gold medalist(s)	(Philippines) Carlos Yulo	6.300	8.833	0.000	15.133
2nd place, silver medalist(s)	(China) Yin Dehang	6.400	8.633	0.000	15.033
3rd place, bronze medalist(s)	(Uzbekistan) Rasuljon Abdurakhimov	5.900	8.966	0.000	14.866
4	(North Korea) Pak Song-hyok	6.300	8.466	0.000	14.766
5	(China) Xie Chenyi	6.200	8.266	0.000	14.466
6	(Vietnam) Van Vi Luong	5.400	8.400	0.000	13.800
7	(Iran) Mohammadreza Khosronezhad	4.600	9.133	0.000	13.733
8	(Uzbekistan) Utkirbek Juraev	5.600	8.133	0.000	13.733

=== Horizontal bar ===
Rank	Gymnast	D Score	E Score	Pen.	Total
1st place, gold medalist(s)	(Kazakhstan) Milad Karimi	6.600	8.433	0.000	15.033
2nd place, silver medalist(s)	(China) Tian Hao	6.300	8.000	0.000	14.300
3rd place, bronze medalist(s)	(China) Liao Jialei	6.100	7.700	0.000	13.800
4	(Philippines) Carlos Yulo	5.400	8.033	0.000	13.433
5	(South Korea) Kim Jae-ho	5.000	8.400	0.000	13.400
6	(Uzbekistan) Abdulla Azimov	4.900	8.466	0.000	13.366
7	(Uzbekistan) Utkirbek Juraev	4.400	8.933	0.000	13.333
8	(South Korea) Park Seung-ho	4.700	7.533	0.000	12.233

== Junior results ==
=== Individual all-around ===
Rank	Gymnast	Floor (gymnastics)	Pommel horse	Rings (gymnastics)	Vault (gymnastics)	Parallel bars	Horizontal bar	Total
1st place, gold medalist(s)	(China) Hong Yanming	13.166	14.466	13.000	14.100	13.266	12.333	80.331
2nd place, silver medalist(s)	(China) Yang Lanbin	13.100	12.766	12.666	14.266	13.766	13.300	79.864
3rd place, bronze medalist(s)	(Japan) Ryokei Takahashi	13.333	11.533	13.033	14.100	12.900	13.500	78.399
4	(Japan) Eijun Yasui	12.300	12.533	13.200	14.000	13.000	13.000	78.033
5	(Iran) Abolfazl Nikkhoualamsh	13.066	12.666	13.233	13.133	12.533	13.166	77.797
6	(Kazakhstan) Nurtan Idrissov	13.200	11.800	12.766	14.033	13.533	12.366	77.698
7	(South Korea) Kim Tae-yang	13.233	12.433	12.666	13.333	12.433	12.200	76.298
8	(Kazakhstan) Roman Khegay	13.400	12.800	12.166	13.833	12.400	11.433	76.032

=== Floor ===
Rank	Gymnast	D Score	E Score	Pen.	Total
1st place, gold medalist(s)	(Japan) Ryokei Takahashi	4.900	8.566	0.000	13.466
1st place, gold medalist(s)	(Kazakhstan) Roman Khegay	4.900	8.566	0.000	13.466
3rd place, bronze medalist(s)	(Kazakhstan) Nurtan Idrissov	5.100	8.333	0.000	13.433
4	(China) Wang Chengcheng	4.600	8.733	0.000	13.333
5	(Uzbekistan) Sarvar Abulfaizov	4.800	8.333	0.000	13.133
6	(South Korea) Kim Tae-yang	4.700	8.333	0.000	13.033
7	(China) Hong Yanming	4.500	8.433	0.000	12.933
8	(South Korea) Kim Seung-bin	4.800	7.366	-0.300	11.866

=== Pommel horse ===
Rank	Gymnast	D Score	E Score	Pen.	Total
1st place, gold medalist(s)	(China) Hong Yanming	5.600	8.800	0.000	14.400
2nd place, silver medalist(s)	(China) Wang Chengcheng	5.000	8.633	0.000	13.633
3rd place, bronze medalist(s)	(Iran) Abolfazl Nikkhoualamsh	4.300	9.033	0.000	13.333
4	(Kazakhstan) Roman Khegay	4.500	8.666	0.000	13.166
5	(Vietnam) Vo Hoang Phi Ho	4.500	8.000	0.000	12.500
6	(Chinese Taipei) Hsiao Yu-lun	3.800	8.633	0.000	12.433
7	(Kazakhstan) Artyom Kovalyov	4.900	6.266	0.000	11.166
8	(Japan) Eijun Yasui	4.300	5.700	0.000	10.000

=== Rings ===
Rank	Gymnast	D Score	E Score	Pen.	Total
1st place, gold medalist(s)	(Iran) Abolfazl Nikkhoualamsh	4.300	8.800	0.000	13.100
2nd place, silver medalist(s)	(Kazakhstan) Nurtan Idrissov	4.500	8.600	0.000	13.100
3rd place, bronze medalist(s)	(Japan) Ryokei Takahashi	4.700	8.400	0.000	13.100
4	(Japan) Eijun Yasui	4.400	8.666	0.000	13.066
5	(China) Hong Yanming	4.200	8.833	0.000	13.033
6	(Iran) Aliasghar Abbasiroushan	4.500	8.466	0.000	12.966
7	(Uzbekistan) Sarvar Abulfaizov	3.900	8.866	0.000	12.766
8	(China) Zheng Ao	3.900	8.766	0.000	12.666

=== Vault ===
Rank	Gymnast	Vault 1				Vault 2				Total
Rank	Gymnast	D Score	E Score	Pen.	Score 1	D Score	E Score	Pen.	Score 2	Total
1st place, gold medalist(s)	(Philippines) Eldrew Yulo	5.200	9.500	-0.300	14.400	4.800	9.366	0.000	14.166	14.283
2nd place, silver medalist(s)	(Kazakhstan) Altynkhan Temirbek	5.200	9.200	0.000	14.400	5.200	8.766	0.000	13.966	14.183
3rd place, bronze medalist(s)	(Uzbekistan) Sarvar Abulfaizov	4.800	9.133	0.000	13.933	4.000	9.600	0.000	13.600	13.766
4	(Kazakhstan) Nurtan Idrissov	5.200	8.300	0.000	13.500	4.800	9.166	0.000	13.966	13.733
5	(Jordan) Zaid Al-Khalidi	4.800	9.133	0.000	13.933	4.000	9.233	0.000	13.233	13.583
6	(China) Wang Chengcheng	5.200	8.700	-0.300	13.600	4.000	9.266	0.000	13.266	13.433
7	(Hong Kong) Cheung Ching	5.200	7.666	0.000	12.866	4.800	7.600	-0.300	12.100	12.483
8	(Uzbekistan) Shuhratjon Erkinov	4.000	8.933	0.000	12.933	4.400	7.666	-0.300	11.766	12.349

=== Parallel bars ===
Rank	Gymnast	D Score	E Score	Pen.	Total
1st place, gold medalist(s)	(China) Yang Lanbin	4.700	9.233	0.000	13.933
2nd place, silver medalist(s)	(China) Zheng Ao	4.700	8.933	0.000	13.633
3rd place, bronze medalist(s)	(Singapore) Jovi Loh	4.500	8.866	0.000	13.366
4	(Kazakhstan) Nurtan Idrissov	4.500	8.766	0.000	13.266
5	(Japan) Eijun Yasui	4.700	8.500	0.000	13.200
6	(Japan) Ryokei Takahashi	4.400	8.533	0.000	12.933
7	(Uzbekistan) Mansur Rahmatov	3.900	8.800	0.000	12.700
8	(Kazakhstan) Altynkhan Temirbek	4.000	7.733	0.000	11.733

=== Horizontal bar ===
Rank	Gymnast	D Score	E Score	Pen.	Total
1st place, gold medalist(s)	(Japan) Eijun Yasui	4.700	8.833	0.000	13.533
2nd place, silver medalist(s)	(China) Yang Lanbin	4.500	8.800	0.000	13.300
3rd place, bronze medalist(s)	(Iran) Abolfazl Nikkhoualamsh	4.300	8.733	0.000	13.033
4	(China) Zheng Ao	4.200	8.800	0.000	13.000
5	(Iran) Amirmohammad Rahmanizou	4.100	8.566	0.000	12.666
6	(Vietnam) Nguyen Tran Dai Kim	4.400	8.233	0.000	12.633
7	(Chinese Taipei) Hsiao Yu-lun	3.700	8.466	0.000	12.166
8	(Japan) Ryokei Takahashi	4.400	7.466	0.000	11.866
