= Khabibullo Ergashev =

Uzbekistani artistic gymnast

- Xabibullo Ximoyatillo oʻgʻli Ergashev
- Alternative name: Habibullo Ergashev
- Born: 6 May 1999 (age 27) Fergana, Uzbekistan

Gymnastics career
- Discipline: Men's artistic gymnastics
- Country represented: Uzbekistan (2012–present)
- Head coach: Ravshanbek Mirzaev
Medal record
Representing Uzbekistan
Asian Championships
Silver medal – second place	2024 Tashkent	Team
Islamic Solidarity Games
Silver medal – second place	2021 Konya	Team

Khabibullo Khimayatullah Ergashev (born 6 May 1999) is an Uzbekistani artistic gymnast. He qualified to represent Uzbekistan at the 2024 Summer Olympics and finished 41st in the all-around during the qualification round. He won team silver medals at the 2024 Asian Championships and the 2021 Islamic Solidarity Games.

== Early life ==
Ergashev was born on 6 May 1999, in Fergana. He began gymnastics in 2005.

== Gymnastics career ==
Ergashev finished 22nd in the all-around at the 2019 Asian Championships. He then made his World Championships debut in Stuttgart and finished 116th in the all-around. He finished eighth in the pommel horse final at the 2021 Varna World Challenge Cup.

Ergashev finished fourth in the pommel horse final at the 2022 Doha World Cup. At the 2022 Asian Championships, he finished 14th in the all-around and sixth with the Uzbekistan team. He then competed at the Islamic Solidarity Games and won a silver medal alongside Rasuljon Abdurakhimov and Abdulla Azimov. In the event finals, he finished fifth on the parallel bars and horizontal bar, seventh on the pommel horse, and eighth on the rings. Then at the 2022 World Championships, he finished 45th in the all-around during the qualification round.

Ergashev competed at the 2023 Asian Championships and finished eighth in the all-around and seventh in the pommel horse final. At the 2023 World Championships, Ergashev finished 31st in the all-around during the qualification round. Initially, he was five placements away from qualifying for the all-around final. However, because more than five gymnasts withdrew from the final, Ergashev was called up to compete, and he finished 24th in the final.

Ergashev competed at the 2024 DTB Pokal Stuttgart and finished 12th with his team. He won a silver medal in the team event at the 2024 Asian Championships. He received a berth for the 2024 Olympic Games based on his all-around placement at the 2023 World Championships after France's host country spot was reallocated. Then at the Olympic Games, he finished 41st in the all-around during the qualification round.
