= 2026 Asian Men's Artistic Gymnastics Championships =

Gymnastics event in China

2026 Asian Artistic Gymnastics Championships
- Venue: Zunyi Olympic Sports Centre Stadium
- Location: Zunyi, China
- Start date: 18 June 2026
- End date: 21 June 2026

The 2026 Asian Men's Artistic Gymnastics Championships was the 13th edition of the Senior Asian Artistic Gymnastics Championships and 19th Junior Asian Gymnastics Championships, and was held in Zunyi, China from 18 to 21 June 2026.

== Participating countries ==
- Bangladesh
- China
- Chinese Taipei
- Hong Kong
- India
- Indonesia
- Iran
- Japan
- Jordan
- Kazakhstan
- Kyrgyzstan
- Malaysia
- North Korea
- Philippines
- Qatar
- Singapore
- South Korea
- Sri Lanka
- Thailand
- Uzbekistan
- Vietnam

== Medal summary ==
Event	Gold	Silver	Bronze
Senior
Team all-around	China; Li Hongyan; Liu Yang; Tian Hao; Yang Haonan; Zhang Boheng	Japan; Tsuyoshi Hasegawa; Fusuke Maeda; Teppei Miwa; Wataru Tanigawa; Shoma Tsukiyama	South Korea; Hur Woong; Kim Jae-ho; Lee Jung-hyo; Ryu Sung-hyun; Seo Jung-won
Individual all-around	(China) Zhang Boheng	(China) Yang Haonan	(Japan) Teppei Miwa
Floor exercise	(Philippines) Carlos Yulo	(Japan) Shoma Tsukiyama	(Philippines) Eldrew Yulo
Pommel horse	(Uzbekistan) Utkirbek Juraev	(China) Zhang Boheng	(Chinese Taipei) Lee Chih-kai
Rings	(China) Yang Haonan	(China) Zhang Boheng	(Iran) Mehdi Ahmad Kohani
Vault	(Japan) Wataru Tanigawa	(South Korea) Kim Jae-ho	(Iran) Mahdi Olfati
Parallel bars	(China) Zhang Boheng	(South Korea) Ryu Sung-hyun	(Chinese Taipei) Hung Yuan-hsi
Horizontal bar	(Chinese Taipei) Tang Chia-hung	(China) Zhang Boheng	(Japan) Fusuke Maeda
Junior
Team all-around	China; Chen Junji; Dong Li; Long Houcheng; Yang Lanbin; Zhang Mohan	Japan; Ikki Nishihara; Tomoharu Tanida; Eijun Yasui	India; Sk Nabhigh Ali; Mohd Zaid Ansari; Akshat Bajaj; Harschit Damodharan; Nishad Naravane
Individual all-around	(Japan) Ikki Nishihara	(South Korea) Kim Tae-yang	(China) Yang Lanbin
Floor exercise	(Japan) Tomoharu Tanida	(Japan) Ikki Nishihara	(China) Zhang Mohan
Pommel horse	(Japan) Ikki Nishihara (Malaysia) Anson Tan Yu Hang	Not awarded	(Uzbekistan) Timur Kamaev
Rings	(China) Chen Junji	(China) Dong Li	(South Korea) Kim Tae-yang
Vault	(India) Harschit Damodharan	(India) Akshat Bajaj	(Uzbekistan) Bekzad Bakhtiyarov
Parallel bars	(Japan) Ikki Nishihara	(China) Yang Lanbin	(South Korea) Seo Hanul
Horizontal bar	(Japan) Ikki Nishihara	(China) Dong Li	(China) Yang Lanbin

== Medal table ==
=== Overall ===
* Host nation (China)

Rank	Nation	Gold	Silver	Bronze	Total
1	China*	6	7	3	16
2	Japan	6	4	2	12
3	India	1	1	1	3
4	Chinese Taipei	1	0	2	3
4	Uzbekistan	1	0	2	3
6	Philippines	1	0	1	2
7	Malaysia	1	0	0	1
8	South Korea	0	3	3	6
9	Iran	0	0	2	2
Totals (9 entries)		17	15	16	48

=== Senior ===
* Host nation (China)

Rank	Nation	Gold	Silver	Bronze	Total
1	China*	4	4	0	8
2	Japan	1	2	2	5
3	Chinese Taipei	1	0	2	3
4	Philippines	1	0	1	2
5	Uzbekistan	1	0	0	1
6	South Korea	0	2	1	3
7	Iran	0	0	2	2
Totals (7 entries)		8	8	8	24

=== Junior ===
* Host nation (China)

Rank	Nation	Gold	Silver	Bronze	Total
1	Japan	5	2	0	7
2	China*	2	3	3	8
3	India	1	1	1	3
4	Malaysia	1	0	0	1
5	South Korea	0	1	2	3
6	Uzbekistan	0	0	2	2
Totals (6 entries)		9	7	8	24

== Senior results ==
=== Individual all-around ===
All gymnasts took part in the individual all-around competition with no prior qualification round. The following is the top 8 of the all-around. Only two athletes per country were eligible for ranking.

Rank	Gymnast	Floor (gymnastics)	Pommel horse	Rings (gymnastics)	Vault (gymnastics)	Parallel bars	Horizontal bar	Total
1st place, gold medalist(s)	(China) Zhang Boheng	13.600	14.066	14.400	14.433	14.366	14.433	85.298
2nd place, silver medalist(s)	(China) Yang Haonan	14.000	13.566	14.333	14.433	12.366	13.700	82.398
3rd place, bronze medalist(s)	(Japan) Teppei Miwa	13.666	13.100	13.900	14.133	13.733	13.733	82.265
4	(Philippines) Carlos Yulo	14.433	13.166	13.433	13.400	13.966	13.466	81.864
5	(Japan) Wataru Tanigawa	13.733	13.333	14.033	14.300	12.333	13.533	81.265
6	(South Korea) Ryu Sung-hyun	13.800	13.233	13.000	14.333	13.900	12.500	80.766
–	(Japan) Tsuyoshi Hasegawa	12.633	13.866	13.500	13.533	13.900	12.866	80.298
7	(Chinese Taipei) Hung Yuan-hsi	12.900	12.766	12.466	13.533	14.000	13.200	78.865
8	(Uzbekistan) Ravshan Kamiljanov	13.233	13.833	12.533	13.400	12.266	12.833	78.098

=== Floor exercise ===
Rank	Gymnast	D Score	E Score	Pen.	Bon.	Total
1st place, gold medalist(s)	(Philippines) Carlos Yulo	6.000	8.700	0.000	0.000	14.700
2nd place, silver medalist(s)	(Japan) Shoma Tsukiyama	5.600	8.900	0.000	0.100	14.600
3rd place, bronze medalist(s)	(Philippines) Eldrew Yulo	5.500	8.700	0.000	0.100	14.300
4	(China) Li Hongyan	5.200	8.766	0.000	0.100	14.066
5	(China) Yang Haonan	5.200	8.733	0.000	0.000	13.933
6	(South Korea) Ryu Sung-hyun	5.800	8.200	0.100	0.000	13.900
7	(Japan) Wataru Tanigawa	5.000	8.766	0.000	0.100	13.866
8	(Kazakhstan) Dmitriy Patanin	5.500	8.300	0.100	0.000	13.700

=== Pommel horse ===
Rank	Gymnast	D Score	E Score	Pen.	Bon.	Total
1st place, gold medalist(s)	(Uzbekistan) Utkirbek Juraev	5.600	8.966	0.000	0.000	14.566
2nd place, silver medalist(s)	(China) Zhang Boheng	5.400	9.000	0.000	0.000	14.400
3rd place, bronze medalist(s)	(Chinese Taipei) Lee Chih-kai	5.500	8.633	0.000	0.000	14.133
4	(Japan) Shoma Tsukiyama	5.300	8.766	0.000	0.000	14.066
5	(Qatar) Rakan Al-Harith	5.000	8.733	0.000	0.000	13.733
6	(South Korea) Hur Woong	6.000	7.600	0.000	0.000	13.600
7	(China) Tian Hao	5.500	7.600	0.000	0.000	13.100
8	(Uzbekistan) Khabibullo Ergashev	5.000	7.733	0.000	0.000	12.733

=== Rings ===
Rank	Gymnast	D Score	E Score	Pen.	Bon.	Total
1st place, gold medalist(s)	(China) Yang Haonan	5.400	9.066	0.000	0.100	14.566
2nd place, silver medalist(s)	(China) Zhang Boheng	5.600	8.800	0.000	0.000	14.400
3rd place, bronze medalist(s)	(Iran) Mehdi Ahmad Kohani	5.200	8.900	0.000	0.000	14.100
4	(Japan) Teppei Miwa	5.000	8.733	0.000	0.100	13.833
5	(Japan) Wataru Tanigawa	5.300	8.400	0.000	0.100	13.800
6	(North Korea) Oh Myong-do	5.500	7.700	0.000	0.000	13.200
7	(Chinese Taipei) Tang Chia-hung	4.700	8.166	0.000	0.000	12.866
8	(Qatar) Mehrdad Ghadimi	5.100	7.600	0.300	0.000	12.466

=== Vault ===
Rank	Gymnast	Vault 1					Vault 2					Total
Rank	Gymnast	D Score	E Score	Pen.	Bon.	Score 1	D Score	E Score	Pen.	Bon.	Score 2	Total
1st place, gold medalist(s)	(Japan) Wataru Tanigawa	5.200	9.233	0.000	0.100	14.533	5.200	8.900	0.000	0.000	14.100	14.316
2nd place, silver medalist(s)	(South Korea) Kim Jae-ho	5.200	9.000	0.000	0.000	14.200	5.200	9.066	0.100	0.000	14.200	14.183
3rd place, bronze medalist(s)	(Iran) Mahdi Olfati	5.600	9.200	0.000	0.000	14.800	5.200	8.500	0.300	0.000	13.400	14.100
4	(Uzbekistan) Abdulaziz Mirvaliev	4.800	9.033	0.000	0.000	13.833	5.200	9.033	0.100	0.000	14.133	13.983
5	(Vietnam) Trịnh Hải Khang	5.200	9.166	0.000	0.000	14.366	4.800	8.600	0.000	0.000	13.400	13.883
6	(Mongolia) Enkhtuvshin Damdindorj	4.800	9.266	0.100	0.100	14.066	4.400	9.100	0.000	0.000	13.500	13.783
7	(Hong Kong) Ng Ka Ki	5.200	8.000	0.000	0.000	13.200	5.200	8.800	0.000	0.000	14.000	13.600
8	(Malaysia) Sharul Aimy	5.200	7.766	0.000	0.000	12.966	4.800	8.866	0.000	0.000	13.666	13.316

=== Parallel bars ===
Rank	Gymnast	D Score	E Score	Pen.	Bon.	Total
1st place, gold medalist(s)	(China) Zhang Boheng	5.900	8.933	0.000	0.100	14.933
2nd place, silver medalist(s)	(South Korea) Ryu Sung-hyun	5.500	8.900	0.000	0.100	14.500
3rd place, bronze medalist(s)	(Chinese Taipei) Hung Yuan-hsi	5.700	8.100	0.000	0.000	13.800
4	(Japan) Tsuyoshi Hasegawa	5.400	8.333	0.000	0.000	13.733
5	(Japan) Teppei Miwa	5.400	8.266	0.000	0.000	13.666
6	(Philippines) Carlos Yulo	5.400	8.066	0.000	0.100	13.566
7	(China) Liu Yang	5.300	8.000	0.000	0.000	13.300
8	(North Korea) Pak Song-hyok	5.400	7.500	0.000	0.000	12.000

=== Horizontal bar ===
Rank	Gymnast	D Score	E Score	Pen.	Bon.	Total
1st place, gold medalist(s)	(Chinese Taipei) Tang Chia-hung	6.600	8.900	0.000	0.000	15.500
2nd place, silver medalist(s)	(China) Zhang Boheng	6.200	8.800	0.000	0.000	15.000
3rd place, bronze medalist(s)	(Japan) Fusuke Maeda	6.900	7.400	0.000	0.000	14.300
4	(Philippines) Eldrew Yulo	5.100	8.633	0.000	0.100	13.833
5	(Philippines) Carlos Yulo	4.900	8.600	0.000	0.100	13.500
6	(Japan) Teppei Miwa	4.800	7.200	0.000	0.000	12.000
7	(Kazakhstan) Diyan Toishybek	4.100	6.266	0.000	0.000	10.366
8	(China) Li Hongyan	–	–	–	–	DNS
