= Yang Haonan =

Chinese gymnast (born 2003)

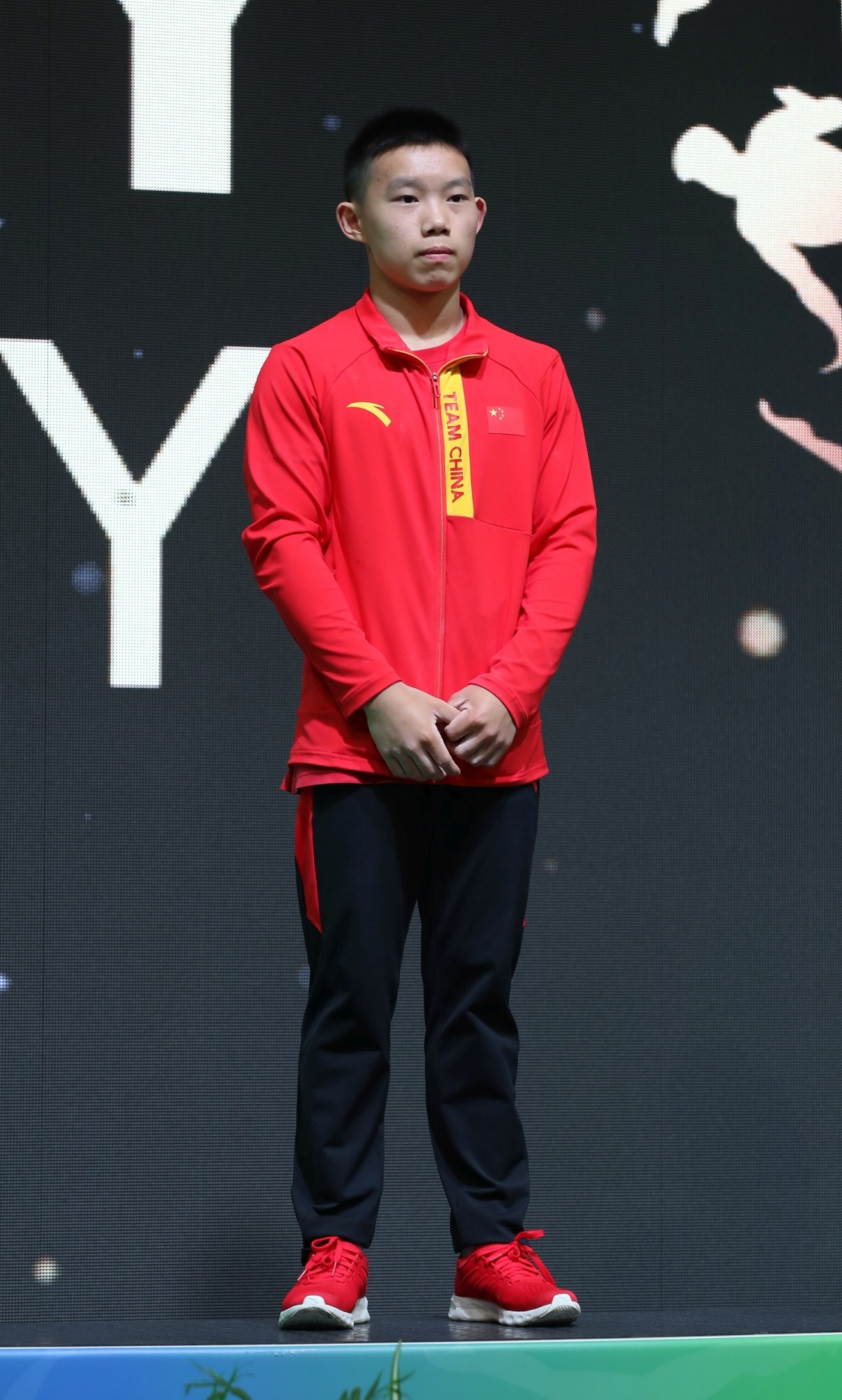
- Yang Haonan in 2019

Personal information
- Born: 20 January 2003 (age 23)

Gymnastics career
- Discipline: Men's artistic gymnastics
- Country represented: China
Medal record
Representing China
Men's artistic gymnastics
World Championships
Silver medal – second place	2026 Rotterdam	All-around
Bronze medal – third place	2026 Rotterdam	Team
Asian Championships
Gold medal – first place	2026 Zunyi	Team
Gold medal – first place	2026 Zunyi	Rings
Silver medal – second place	2025 Jecheon	Team
Silver medal – second place	2025 Jecheon	Rings
Silver medal – second place	2026 Zunyi	All-around
Junior World Championships
Silver medal – second place	2019 Győr	Vault
Silver medal – second place	2019 Győr	Parallel bars
Bronze medal – third place	2019 Győr	Rings

Yang Haonan (born 20 January 2003) is a Chinese artistic gymnast. In 2019, he won two silver medals and one bronze medal at the 2019 Junior World Artistic Gymnastics Championships held in Győr, Hungary. He won the silver medal both in the vault and parallel bars events. He also won the bronze medal in the rings.

== Competitive history ==
Competitive history of Yang Haonan
Year	Event	Team	AA	FX	PH	SR	VT	PB	HB
2026	World Championships	3rd place, bronze medalist(s)	2nd place, silver medalist(s)						
