= Tian Hao =

Chinese artistic gymnast (born 2001)

- Born: 30 November 2001 (age 24) Jiaxing, Zhejiang, China

Gymnastics career
- Country represented: China
Medal record
Representing China
Men's artistic gymnastics
World Championships
Bronze medal – third place	2026 Rotterdam	Team
Asian Games
Gold medal – first place	2026 Aichi-Nagoya	Team
Gold medal – first place	2026 Aichi-Nagoya	Horizontal bar
Asian Championships
Gold medal – first place	2023 Singapore	Team
Gold medal – first place	2023 Singapore	Horizontal bar
Gold medal – first place	2024 Tashkent	Team
Gold medal – first place	2026 Zunyi	Team
Silver medal – second place	2024 Tashkent	Horizontal bar
Silver medal – second place	2025 Jecheon	Team
Bronze medal – third place	2025 Jecheon	Horizontal bar

Tian Hao (born 30 November 2001) is a Chinese artistic gymnast who specializes in the horizontal bar. He a bronze medalist at the World Championships, two-time gold medalist at the Asian Games and has won seven medals at the Asian Championships.

== Career ==
Tian competed for Zhejiang at the 2022 Chinese Championships. There, he won the silver medal in the pommel horse and bronze medals in the team event and on the horizontal bar. At the 2023 Asian Championships, Tian was part of the Chinese team won the gold medal ahead of Japan, while in the event finals, he won gold medal on the horizontal bar.

At the 2024 Chinese Championships, Tian won the silver and bronze medals on the horizontal bar. He competed in the 2024 World Cup series, where he won the silver medal on horizontal bar at the event in Cottbus. He then competed at the 2024 Asian Championships, where he won a gold medal in the team competition and silver medal on the horizontal bar.

Tian competed at the 2025 Asian Championships, where he was part of the Chinese team that won the silver medal and also won the silver medal on the horizontal bar. At the 2026 Chinese Championships, he represented Zhejiang and won the gold medal in the team event and on the horizontal bar. Tian competed at the 2026 Asian Championships and was part of the Chinese team that won team gold. At the 2026 Asian Games, he was part the Chinese team that won team gold and also won gold for horizontal bar. He then competed at the 2026 World Championships in Rotterdam, Netherlands and won a bronze medal in the team competition.
