= Mehdi Ahmad Kohani =

Iranian gymnast (born 1997)

- Full name: Mehdi Ahmad Kohani
- Born: 13 October 1997 (age 28) Kerman, Iran
- Height: 1.67 m (5 ft 6 in)

Gymnastics career
- Country represented: Iran
Medal record
Representing Iran
Asian Gymnastics Championships
Bronze medal – third place	2019 Ulaanbaatar	Rings
Bronze medal – third place	2022 Doha	Rings
Bronze medal – third place	2026 Zunyi	Rings
Artistic Gymnastics World Cup
Silver medal – second place	2020 Melbourne	Rings
Bronze medal – third place	2021 Doha	Rings
Silver medal – second place	2023 Cottbus	Rings
Silver medal – second place	2023 Baku	Rings

Mehdi Ahmad Kohani (born 13 October 1997) is an Iranian artistic gymnast.

He has a history of being a champion in Asian competitions and has also won silver and bronze medals in World Cup competitions.
