= Milad Karimi =

Kazakh gymnast (born 1999)

- Full name: Milad Karimi; Persian: میلاد کریمی
- Born: 21 June 1999 (age 27) Almaty, Kazakhstan
- Height: 169 cm (5 ft 7 in)

Gymnastics career
- Discipline: Men's artistic gymnastics
- Country represented: Kazakhstan
- Gym: Koncha-Zaspa Olympic Training and Sports Center (Ukraine)
- Head coaches: Aleksandr Kim, Stepan Gorbachyov
Medal record
World Championships
Bronze medal – third place	2023 Antwerp	Floor Exercise
Asian Games
Silver medal – second place	2026 Aichi–Nagoya	Floor Exercise
Asian Championships
Gold medal – first place	2024 Tashkent	Horizontal Bar
Silver medal – second place	2019 Ulaanbaatar	Floor Exercise
Silver medal – second place	2024 Tashkent	All-Around
Silver medal – second place	2024 Tashkent	Floor Exercise
Silver medal – second place	2025 Jecheon	Floor Exercise
Bronze medal – third place	2017 Bangkok	Horizontal Bar
Bronze medal – third place	2019 Ulaanbaatar	Vault
Bronze medal – third place	2022 Doha	Horizontal Bar
Bronze medal – third place	2023 Singapore	Team
Bronze medal – third place	2025 Jecheon	Team
Summer Universiade
Gold medal – first place	2021 Chengdu	Horizontal Bar
Silver medal – second place	2019 Naples	Horizontal Bar
Silver medal – second place	2021 Chengdu	Floor Exercise
Bronze medal – third place	2021 Chengdu	Vault
Islamic Solidarity Games
Silver medal – second place	2021 Konya	Horizontal Bar
Bronze medal – third place	2021 Konya	Team
FIG World Cup
Event	1st	2nd	3rd
Apparatus World Cup	8	8	3
World Challenge Cup	2	7	1
Total	10	15	4

Milad Karimi (Kazakh: Милад Карими; born 21 June 1999) is a Kazakh artistic gymnast. He represented Kazakhstan at the 2020 and 2024 Summer Olympics. He is the 2023 World bronze medalist on floor exercise.

== Personal life ==
Karimi was born in Almaty to a Russian mother and Iranian father.

== Career ==
In 2017, he won the bronze medal in the horizontal bar event at the Asian Artistic Gymnastics Championships held in Bangkok, Thailand. A few months later, he represented Kazakhstan at the 2017 Summer Universiade in Taipei, Taiwan without winning a medal. In the same year, he also competed in the floor exercise at the 2017 World Artistic Gymnastics Championships held in Montreal, Quebec, Canada.

He represented Kazakhstan at the 2018 Asian Games held in Jakarta, Indonesia. In the horizontal bar he finished in 8th place in the final and in the floor exercise he finished in 5th place in the final. He also competed in the men's artistic team event where Kazakhstan finished in 6th place in the final.

In 2019, he won the silver medal in the horizontal bar event at the Summer Universiade held in Naples, Italy. In 2020, he won the bronze medal in the floor exercise in Melbourne, Australia as part of the 2020 FIG Artistic Gymnastics World Cup series. He also won the silver medal in the horizontal bar event. In the competition held in Baku, Azerbaijan he also won the bronze medal in the floor exercise.

He represented his country at the 2020 Summer Olympics. He qualified for the All-around finals as well as event finals for floor exercise and horizontal bar. He finished 14th in the all-around finals, 5th in floor and 8th in the horizontal bar.

== Competitive history ==
Competitive history of Milad Karimi
Year	Event	Team	AA	FX	PH	SR	VT	PB	HB
2014
2014	Junior Asian Championships	4							
2014	Voronin Cup (junior)	8	5	1st place, gold medalist(s)	4	7		5	6
2015	Voronin Cup (junior)	5	5	4	4	5	7		2nd place, silver medalist(s)
2017	World Cup Doha			2nd place, silver medalist(s)					
2017	Asian Championships		5	6				7	3rd place, bronze medalist(s)
2018	President's Cup		1st place, gold medalist(s)	3rd place, bronze medalist(s)				1st place, gold medalist(s)	4
2018	Kazakhstan Championships			2nd place, silver medalist(s)					
2018	Asian Games	6		5					8
2018	World Championships	16							
2018	World Cup Cottbus						5		
2019	World Cup Melbourne						8		8
2019	World Cup Koper			2nd place, silver medalist(s)			8	2nd place, silver medalist(s)	
2019	World Cup Baku			7					
2019	World Cup Doha								8
2019	Asian Championships	5	11	2nd place, silver medalist(s)			3rd place, bronze medalist(s)	5	8
2019	Summer Universiade		5	7				4	2nd place, silver medalist(s)
2019	World Championships		21						
2019	World Cup Cottbus			8					
2020	World Cup Melbourne			3rd place, bronze medalist(s)			4	7	2nd place, silver medalist(s)
2020	World Cup Szombathely			7			6	2nd place, silver medalist(s)	2nd place, silver medalist(s)
2021	Ukraine International Cup		5	1st place, gold medalist(s)	8	5		2nd place, silver medalist(s)	1st place, gold medalist(s)
2021	World Cup Osjiek			1st place, gold medalist(s)			3rd place, bronze medalist(s)	2nd place, silver medalist(s)	4
2021	World Cup Doha			5	5		7	4	3rd place, bronze medalist(s)
2021	Olympic Games		14	5					8
2021	World Cup Mersin						2nd place, silver medalist(s)		7
2021	World Championships		WD	7					5
2022	Cottbus World Cup			5			4		8
2022	Doha World Cup			4				2nd place, silver medalist(s)	
2022	Baku World Cup			2nd place, silver medalist(s)					
2022	Asian Championships	5	10					4	3rd place, bronze medalist(s)
2022	Islamic Solidarity Games	3rd place, bronze medalist(s)	4	4	8			4	2nd place, silver medalist(s)
2022	Szombathely Challenge Cup			2nd place, silver medalist(s)					
2022	World Championships	18		8					
2023	Cottbus World Cup			7					
2023	Doha World Cup							6	6
2023	Baku World Cup			1st place, gold medalist(s)					
2023	Cairo World Cup			6					
2023	World University Games	5	5	2nd place, silver medalist(s)			3rd place, bronze medalist(s)		1st place, gold medalist(s)
2023	World Championships		5	3rd place, bronze medalist(s)					4
2024	Cottbus World Cup						8		
2024	Baku World Cup			WD					
2024	Doha World Cup			1st place, gold medalist(s)				8	8
2024	Asian Championships	4	2nd place, silver medalist(s)	2nd place, silver medalist(s)	7				1st place, gold medalist(s)
2024	Olympic Games		24	5					
2025	Cottbus World Cup			1st place, gold medalist(s)					
2025	Baku World Cup			2nd place, silver medalist(s)					4
2025	Osijek World Cup			3rd place, bronze medalist(s)					1st place, gold medalist(s)
2025	Doha World Cup			1st place, gold medalist(s)					1st place, gold medalist(s)
2025	Cairo World Cup			1st place, gold medalist(s)					1st place, gold medalist(s)
2025	Asian Championships	3rd place, bronze medalist(s)		2nd place, silver medalist(s)					6
2025	Szombathely World Challenge Cup								1st place, gold medalist(s)
2025	World Championships	—N/a		6					5
2026	Baku World Cup			2nd place, silver medalist(s)					2nd place, silver medalist(s)
2026	Osijek World Cup								2nd place, silver medalist(s)
2026	Asian Games	4		2nd place, silver medalist(s)				R2	4
2026	World Championships	12							
