= Fusuke Maeda =

Japanese artistic gymnast (born 2000)

- 前田 楓丞
- Born: 20 June 2000 (age 26)

Gymnastics career
- Discipline: Men's artistic gymnastics
- Country represented: Japan
Medal record
Representing Japan
Men's artistic gymnastics
World Championships
Gold medal – first place	2026 Rotterdam	Team
Asian Championships
Silver medal – second place	2026 Zunyi	Team
Bronze medal – third place	2026 Zunyi	Horizontal bar

Fusuke Maeda (前田楓丞, Maeda Fusuke; born 20 June 2000) is a Japanese artistic gymnast. He helped Japan win a gold medal in the team all-around at the 2026 World Artistic Gymnastics Championships.

== Gymnastics career ==
In May 2026, Maeda competed at the 65th NHK Cup Gymnastics Championships and posted a score of 15.633 on the horizontal bar, which ranks among the highest in the world under the current scoring system. In June 2026, he competed at the 2026 Asian Men's Artistic Gymnastics Championships and won a silver medal in the team all-around event. He also won a bronze medal on the horizontal bars. Following his performance he was selected to represent Japan at the 2026 World Artistic Gymnastics Championships. In October 2026, he competed at the 2026 World Artistic Gymnastics Championships and helped Japan win a gold medal in the team all-around.
