= Shoma Tsukiyama =

Japanese artistic gymnast

Personal information
- Nationality: Japanese
- Born: 21 April 2003 (age 23) Tokyo, Japan
- Education: Osaka University of Health and Sport Sciences

Sport
- Sport: Artistic gymnastics
- Club: Higashi Gymnastics School / Namisho Gakuen Otaidai Club
Medal record
Men's artistic gymnastics
Representing Japan
Asian Games
Silver medal – second place	2026 Aichi–Nagoya	Team
Bronze medal – third place	2026 Aichi–Nagoya	Floor exercise
Asian Artistic Gymnastics Championships
Silver medal – second place	2026 Zunyi	Team
Silver medal – second place	2026 Zunyi	Floor exercise

Shoma Tsukiyama (Japanese: 築山翔馬; born 21 April 2003) is a Japanese artistic gymnast. He represented Japan at the 2026 Asian Games, where he won silver in the men's team all-around and bronze in floor exercise. He has also won medals at the Asian Artistic Gymnastics Championships.

== Career ==
Tsukiyama attended Osaka University of Health and Sport Sciences, where he competed for the university's men's gymnastics team. In 2025, he won the men's competition at the West Japan Student Gymnastics Championships and reached the final of the All-Japan Artistic Gymnastics Individual All-Around Championships. At the 2026 All-Japan Individual All-Around Championships, he placed eighth overall and recorded the highest score in floor exercise.

In June 2026, Tsukiyama competed at the Asian Artistic Gymnastics Championships in Zunyi, China. He won silver medals in the men's team competition and floor exercise, scoring 14.600 in the floor final.

Tsukiyama was selected to represent Japan at the 2026 Asian Games in Aichi and Nagoya. In the men's team all-around, he helped Japan finish second with a score of 253.826 points, earning the silver medal. In the individual apparatus finals, he won bronze in floor exercise with a score of 14.566. He also placed sixth in the pommel horse final and eighth in the horizontal bar final.
