= Zhang Boheng =

Chinese gymnast

- 张博恒
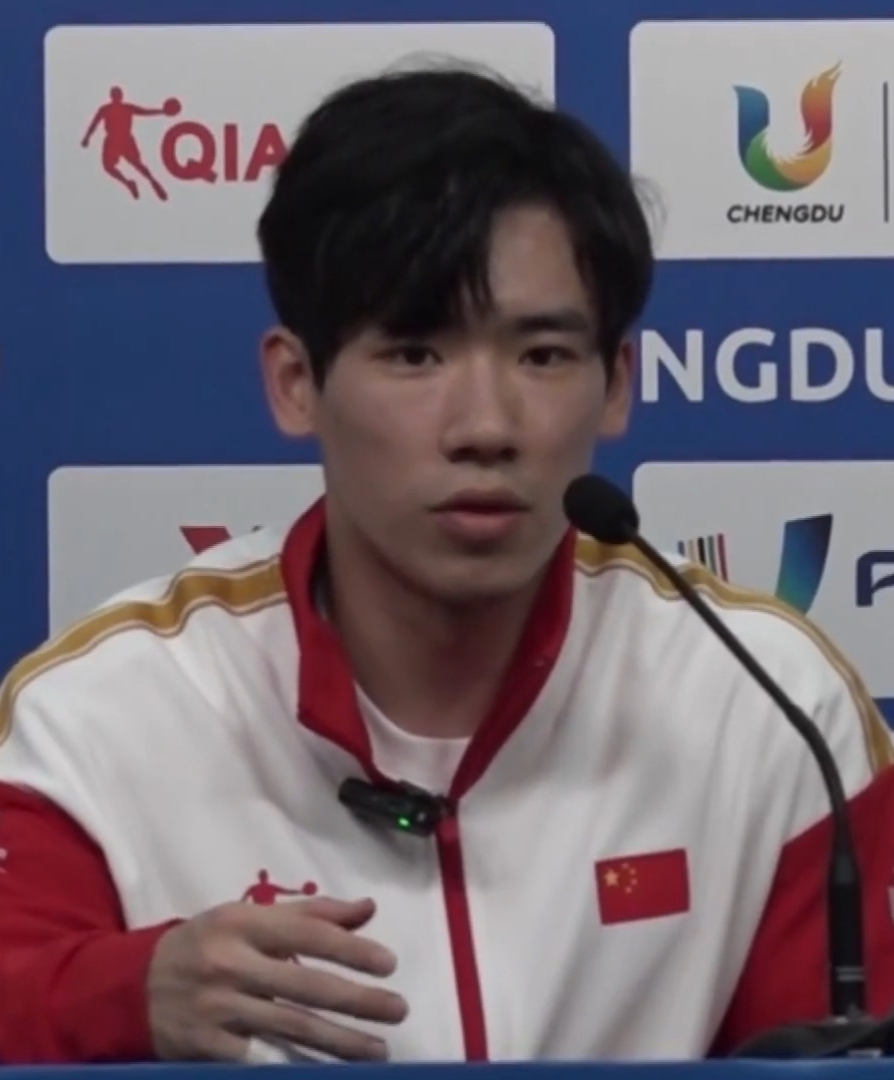
- Zhang in 2023

Personal information
- Born: 4 March 2000 (age 26) Changsha, Hunan, China

Gymnastics career
- Discipline: Men's artistic gymnastics
- Country represented: China
- Club: Hunan Province
- Head coach: Chen Wei
Medal record
Men's artistic gymnastics
Representing China
Olympic Games
Silver medal – second place	2024 Paris	Team
Silver medal – second place	2024 Paris	All-around
Bronze medal – third place	2024 Paris	Horizontal bar
World Championships
Gold medal – first place	2021 Kitakyushu	All-around
Gold medal – first place	2022 Liverpool	Team
Silver medal – second place	2022 Liverpool	All-around
Silver medal – second place	2025 Jakarta	All-around
Asian Games
Gold medal – first place	2022 Hangzhou	Team
Gold medal – first place	2022 Hangzhou	All-around
Gold medal – first place	2022 Hangzhou	Horizontal bar
Gold medal – first place	2026 Aichi-Nagoya	Team
Gold medal – first place	2026 Aichi-Nagoya	All-around
Silver medal – second place	2022 Hangzhou	Floor exercise
Asian Championships
Gold medal – first place	2026 Zunyi	Team
Gold medal – first place	2026 Zunyi	All-around
Gold medal – first place	2026 Zunyi	Parallel bars
Silver medal – second place	2026 Zunyi	Pommel horse
Silver medal – second place	2026 Zunyi	Rings
Silver medal – second place	2026 Zunyi	Horizontal bar
World University Games
Gold medal – first place	2021 Chengdu	Team
Gold medal – first place	2021 Chengdu	All-around
National Games
Gold medal – first place	2025 Guangdong	Horizontal bar
Silver medal – second place	2021 Shaanxi	Team
Silver medal – second place	2025 Guangdong	Team
Silver medal – second place	2021 Shaanxi	All-around
Silver medal – second place	2025 Guangdong	All-around
Silver medal – second place	2025 Guangdong	Parallel bars
Bronze medal – third place	2021 Shaanxi	Floor exercise

Zhang Boheng (Chinese: 张博恒, born 4 March 2000) is a Chinese artistic gymnast. He competed at the 2024 Summer Olympics and won silver medals with the Chinese team and in the individual all-around. He also won a bronze medal on the horizontal bar. He is the 2021 World all-around champion and the 2022 World all-around silver medalist. He won three gold medals at the 2022 Asian Games and two gold medals at the 2021 World University Games.

== Gymnastics career ==
Zhang began gymnastics when he was four years old because his parents were interested in the sport. By 2009, he joined the Hunan provincial team. When he was 16, he broke his leg, but this injury inspired him to take his gymnastics training more seriously. He began training with the Chinese national team in 2018.

=== 2018–20 ===
Zhang won a silver medal with the Hunan team at the 2018 Chinese Championships. Then at the 2019 Chinese Championships, he placed seventh in the all-around, fifth on the still rings, and fourth on the horizontal bar. Later that year, he won a bronze medal on the vault at the Chinese Individual Championships. He finished fifth in the all-around at the 2020 Chinese Championships and fourth on the floor exercise and parallel bars. At the 2020 Chinese Individual Championships, he won a silver medal on the pommel horse and a bronze medal on the still rings. He then made his international debut at the 2020 Friendship and Solidarity Competition in Tokyo, competing as part of Team Friendship who lost to Team Solidarity.

=== 2021 ===
Zhang represented Hunan at the 2021 Chinese Championships held in Chengdu, Sichuan, helping the team win the silver medal. Individually, he finished second in the all-around behind Xiao Ruoteng, and he won the national title on floor exercise. He was one of the 12 men selected for the Olympic training squad. He then competed at the Olympic Trials and won the gold medal in the all-around. He ended up being a reserve athlete for the 2020 Olympic team. His lack of international experience was cited as the reason for his exclusion from the team.

Zhang competed at the National Games of China and won the all-around silver medal behind Xiao Ruoteng, and he won a bronze medal in the floor exercise final. He was then selected to compete at the World Championships in Kitakyushu. In the qualification round, he finished second in the all-around to the reining Olympic champion from Japan, Daiki Hashimoto. He also qualified for the still rings and parallel bars finals. In the all-around final, he won the gold medal ahead of Hashimoto by only 0.017 points. He was the fifth Chinese gymnast to win the men's World all-around title. He then withdrew from his event finals.

=== 2022 ===
Zhang won his first national all-around title at the 2022 Chinese Championships. There, he also won the gold medals on the floor exercise and the horizontal bar. He competed at the World Championships in Liverpool despite wrist and waist injuries. He competed alongside Sun Wei, Yang Jiaxing, You Hao, Zou Jingyuan, and alternate Su Weide, and they qualified for the team final in fourth place due to multiple falls, including from Zhang. They rebounded from this performance and won the team title by over 4 points ahead of Japan. Zhang then finished second in the all-around to Daiki Hashimoto after reducing the difficulty of his routines due to his injuries.

=== 2023 ===
Zhang successfully defended his all-around title at the Chinese Championships and also won the horizontal bar title. He was chosen to compete at the World University Games in Chengdu alongside Zou Jingyuan, Shi Cong, Su Weide, and Lan Xingyu. The team won the gold medal ahead of Japan. In the all-around final, Zhang fell off the horizontal bar but still won a gold medal by 0.335 ahead of Shi. He then competed at the Asian Games in Hangzhou alongside Lan, Zou, Lin Chaopan, and Xiao Ruoteng, and they won the team title ahead of Japan. He then won the gold medal in the all-around by over two points ahead of Japan's Takeru Kitazono. In the event finals, he won the gold medal on the horizontal bar and the silver medal on the floor exercise. Because the Asian Games took place around the same time as the World Championships, Zhang did not compete at Worlds.

=== 2024 ===
Zhang withdrew from the all-around final at the Chinese Championships due to a recurring back injury. He still competed on the pommel horse final, winning the bronze medal. He was selected to compete at the China at the 2024 Summer Olympics alongside Liu Yang, Su Weide, Xiao Ruoteng, and Zou Jingyuan.

At the 2024 Olympic Games the Chinese team qualified in first for the team final and individually Zhang qualified in first place for the all-around and horizontal bar finals. During the team final multiple falls caused the Chinese team to win the silver medal behind Japan. Then for the all-around final, Zhang fell while competing on floor exercise, costing him the gold medal to Shinnosuke Oka of Japan. He finished eighth on the floor exercise final after hopping out of bounds on his first tumbling pass. For the horizontal bar final, Zhang fell on his dismount; however, due to the amount of mistakes in the final from numerous competitors, he still tied for the bronze medal with Tang Chia-hung.

=== 2025 ===
Zhang competed at the 2025 Antalya World Cup where he placed fifth on pommel horse and fourth on rings. At the 2025 World Championships, he won silver in the all-around behind Daiki Hashimoto.

=== 2026 ===
Zhang competed at the 2026 Asian Championships and won gold in the all-around while led the Chinese team to also win team gold. Additionally, he won gold on parallel bars and silver on rings, pommel horse, and horizontal bar. Zhang competed at the 2026 Asian Games and won gold in the all-around, retaining his title won at the previous edition, while also lead the Chinese team to win team gold.

== Competitive history ==
Competitive history of Zhang Boheng
Year	Event	Team	AA	FX	PH	SR	VT	PB	HB
2018	Chinese Championships	2nd place, silver medalist(s)							
2019	Chinese Championships	5	7			5			4
2019	Chinese Individual Championships						3rd place, bronze medalist(s)		
2020	Chinese Championships	4	5	4				4	
2020	Chinese Individual Championships				2nd place, silver medalist(s)	3rd place, bronze medalist(s)			
2020	Friendship and Solidarity Competition	2nd place, silver medalist(s)							
2021	Chinese Championships	2nd place, silver medalist(s)	2nd place, silver medalist(s)	1st place, gold medalist(s)		5			8
2021	Chinese Olympic Trials		1st place, gold medalist(s)	3rd place, bronze medalist(s)			3rd place, bronze medalist(s)	3rd place, bronze medalist(s)	1st place, gold medalist(s)
2021	National Games of China	2nd place, silver medalist(s)	2nd place, silver medalist(s)	3rd place, bronze medalist(s)		5			8
2021	World Championships	—N/a	1st place, gold medalist(s)		R1	WD		WD	R1
2022	Chinese Championships	2nd place, silver medalist(s)	1st place, gold medalist(s)	1st place, gold medalist(s)	3rd place, bronze medalist(s)	6		3rd place, bronze medalist(s)	1st place, gold medalist(s)
2022	World Championships	1st place, gold medalist(s)	2nd place, silver medalist(s)	WD				R3	5
2023	Chinese Championships	2nd place, silver medalist(s)	1st place, gold medalist(s)			3rd place, bronze medalist(s)		3rd place, bronze medalist(s)	1st place, gold medalist(s)
2023	World University Games	1st place, gold medalist(s)	1st place, gold medalist(s)	WD				WD	WD
2023	Asian Games	1st place, gold medalist(s)	1st place, gold medalist(s)	2nd place, silver medalist(s)	8			4	1st place, gold medalist(s)
2024	Chinese Championships	2nd place, silver medalist(s)	WD		3rd place, bronze medalist(s)	5			
2024	Olympic Games	2nd place, silver medalist(s)	2nd place, silver medalist(s)	8				4	3rd place, bronze medalist(s)
2025	Antalya World Cup				5	4			
2025	World Championships	—N/a	2nd place, silver medalist(s)			4			
2025	National Games of China	2nd place, silver medalist(s)	2nd place, silver medalist(s)	7		6		2nd place, silver medalist(s)	1st place, gold medalist(s)
2026	Chinese Championships	2nd place, silver medalist(s)	2nd place, silver medalist(s)	5		4		1st place, gold medalist(s)	
2026	Asian Championships	1st place, gold medalist(s)	1st place, gold medalist(s)		2nd place, silver medalist(s)	2nd place, silver medalist(s)		1st place, gold medalist(s)	2nd place, silver medalist(s)
2026	Asian Games	1st place, gold medalist(s)	1st place, gold medalist(s)	WD				WD	WD
