= Artistic gymnastics at the 2026 Summer Youth Olympics – Women's qualification =

Qualification for women's artistic gymnastics competitions at the 2026 Summer Youth Olympics was held on 8 November 2026 at the Dakar Expo Center. The results of the qualification determined the qualifiers to the finals: 8 teams in the team final, 18 gymnasts in the individual all-around final, and 8 gymnasts to make up half of the teams that would qualify for the mixed team final.

== Results ==
=== Team ===
Rank	Team	Vault (gymnastics)	Uneven bars	Balance beam	Floor (gymnastics)	Total	Qual.
1	China	25.999	27.800	27.599	25.466	106.864	Q
1	Chen Ziyan	12.233	13.533	13.133	12.766	106.864	Q
1	Xie Guying	13.033	14.000	13.366	12.700	106.864	Q
1	Zhong Qi	12.966	13.800	14.233	11.933	106.864	Q
2	Japan	27.300	26.666	26.466	25.932	106.364	Q
2	Yume Minamino	13.700	11.933	13.766	13.066	106.364	Q
2	Kanon Nakashima	13.100	13.366	12.700	12.166	106.364	Q
2	Nanami Togo	13.600	13.300	12.633	12.866	106.364	Q
3	Italy	26.033	25.066	25.232	25.499	101.830	Q
3	Dalila D'Aniello	12.733	12.466	11.800	11.766	101.830	Q
3	Sofia Frenna	11.766	12.600	12.366	12.433	101.830	Q
3	Clarissa Rinaldi	13.300	10.966	12.866	13.066	101.830	Q
4	France	26.199	26.732	22.333	26.066	101.330	Q
4	Caly Chayani	12.966	11.466	10.800	12.766	101.330	Q
4	Lilou Marliac	13.033	13.266	10.933	11.466	101.330	Q
4	Louane Plisson	13.166	13.466	11.400	13.300	101.330	Q
5	Canada	26.300	22.166	23.700	25.099	97.265	Q
5	Taya Macey	13.000	10.466	11.800	11.033	97.265	Q
5	Maryam Saber			11.900	12.333	97.265	Q
5	Nikita Théodat	13.300	11.700	11.666	12.766	97.265	Q
6	Australia	24.699	23.632	24.466	24.332	97.129	Q
6	Zara Andrews		10.966	11.566	11.133	97.129	Q
6	Alice Johnson	11.533	11.866	12.533	12.066	97.129	Q
6	Olivia Meaney	13.166	11.766	11.933	12.266	97.129	Q
7	Egypt	25.032	23.966	23.466	23.766	96.230	Q
7	Tia El-Midany	12.366	11.966	11.833	12.100	96.230	Q
7	Karma Khamis	12.666	11.033	11.200	11.666	96.230	Q
7	Lara Soliman	11.533	12.000	11.633	10.566	96.230	Q
8	Romania	25.099	20.666	22.199	23.066	91.030	Q
8	Alexandra Nica	11.766	11.133	10.033	10.933	91.030	Q
8	Aniela Tudor	13.333	9.533	12.166	12.133	91.030	Q
9	Czech Republic	23.600	22.433	21.566	22.866	90.465	R1
9	Kateřina Maříková	11.800	10.300	11.100	11.266	90.465	R1
9	Agáta Slezáková	11.800	10.700	10.266	11.600	90.465	R1
9	Sára Sobolová	11.000	11.733	10.466	11.166	90.465	R1
10	South Africa	23.833	18.399	19.099	23.300	84.531	R2
10	Zia Davids	11.633	8.466	9.133	10.300	84.531	R2
10	Lila du Plessis	10.833	8.733	9.633	11.100	84.531	R2
10	Haylee van Rensburg	12.200	9.666	9.466	12.100	84.531	R2
11	Mexico	23.699	19.499	20.100	20.799	83.797	R3
11	Sophia Garcia	11.500	9.333	9.500	9.966	83.797	R3
11	Camila Valdespino	11.533	9.266	10.600	10.633	83.797	R3
11	Francia Zolozabal	12.166	10.166	7.466	10.166	83.797	R3
12	Great Britain	25.066	24.433	11.600	12.533	73.632	R4
12	Helena Finc	12.633	12.300	11.600	12.533	73.632	R4
12	Jenitha Johnson	12.433	12.133			73.632	R4

=== All-around ===
Rank	Gymnast	Vault (gymnastics)	Uneven bars	Balance beam	Floor (gymnastics)	Total	Qual.
1	(China) Xie Guying	13.033	14.000	13.366	12.700	53.099	Q
2	(China) Zhong Qi	12.966	13.800	14.233	11.933	52.932	Q
3	(Russia) Polina Dmitrieva	13.100	14.000	12.733	12.900	52.733	Q
4	(Japan) Yume Minamino	13.700	11.933	13.766	13.066	52.465	Q
5	(Japan) Nanami Togo	13.600	13.300	12.633	12.866	52.399	Q
6	(China) Chen Ziyan	12.233	13.533	13.133	12.766	51.665	–
7	(France) Louane Plisson	13.166	13.466	11.400	13.300	51.332	Q
8	(Japan) Kanon Nakashima	13.100	13.366	12.700	12.166	51.332	–
9	(Italy) Clarissa Rinaldi	13.300	10.966	12.866	13.066	50.198	Q
10	(Israel) Ophir Shmuely	12.800	12.300	11.866	12.633	49.599	Q
11	(Canada) Nikita Théodat	13.300	11.700	11.666	12.766	49.432	Q
12	(Italy) Sofia Frenna	11.766	12.600	12.366	12.433	49.165	Q
13	(Australia) Olivia Meaney	13.166	11.766	11.933	12.266	49.131	Q
14	(United Kingdom) Helena Finc	12.633	12.300	11.600	12.533	49.066	Q
15	(Italy) Dalila D'Aniello	12.733	12.466	11.800	11.766	48.765	–
16	(France) Lilou Marliac	13.033	13.266	10.933	11.466	48.698	Q
17	(Egypt) Tia El-Midany	12.366	11.966	11.833	12.100	48.265	Q
18	(Belgium) Emma Sneessens	11.933	12.433	11.366	12.400	48.132	Q
19	(France) Caly Chayani	12.966	11.466	10.800	12.766	47.998	–
20	(Australia) Alice Johnson	11.533	11.866	12.533	12.066	47.998	Q
21	(Kazakhstan) Yeva Tatsiyeva	12.733	10.500	11.933	12.700	47.866	Q
22	(Ukraine) Yana Protsenko	12.733	12.366	10.966	11.700	47.765	Q
23	(Spain) Victoria Valeros	12.533	12.333	11.133	11.766	47.765	R1
24	(Brazil) Julie Costa	12.400	11.433	11.666	12.066	47.565	R2
25	(Romania) Aniela Tudor	13.333	9.533	12.166	12.133	47.165	R3
26	(Egypt) Karma Khamis	12.666	11.033	11.200	11.666	46.565	R4
