= Gymnastics at the 2026 Asian Games – Women's balance beam =

Women's balance beam at the 2026 Asian Games
- Venue: Nippon Gaishi Hall Rainbow Hall
- Date: 22 September 2026 (Qualification); 25 September 2026 (Final)
- Competitors: 8 from 5 nations

Medalists
gold medal	Hwang Seo-hyun	South Korea
silver medal	Qiu Qiyuan	China
bronze medal	Mana Okamura	Japan

The women's balance beam competition at the 2026 Asian Games took place on 25 September 2026 at Nippon Gaishi Hall Rainbow Hall.

== Schedule ==
All times are Japan Standard Time (UTC+09:00)

Date	Time	Event
Tuesday, 22 September 2026	12:00	Qualification
Friday, 25 September 2026	15:40	Final

== Qualification ==
Rank	Gymnast	D Score	E Score	Pen.	Total	Qual.
1	Qiu Qiyuan (CHN)	6.5	8.333		14.833	Q
2	Pak Un-jong (PRK)	6.5	7.966		14.466	Q
3	Mana Okamura (JPN)	5.9	8.400		14.300	Q
4	Aiko Sugihara (JPN)	6.0	8.266		14.266	Q
5	Hwang Seo-hyun (KOR)	6.2	7.766		13.966	Q
6	Zhang Qingying (CHN)	6.7	7.233		13.933	Q
7	Han Yon-mi (PRK)	6.1	7.733		13.833	Q
8	Ke Qinqin (CHN)	6.1	7.600		13.700	–
9	Amanda Yap (SGP)	5.2	8.100		13.300	Q
10	Rina Kishi (JPN)	5.8	7.400		13.200	–
10	Lim Su-min (KOR)	5.8	7.400		13.200	R1
12	Lai Pin-ju (TPE)	5.2	7.933		13.133	R2
13	Misa Nishiyama (JPN)	5.6	7.533		13.133	–
14	Dildora Aripova (UZB)	5.1	8.000		13.100	R3

== Final ==
Rank	Gymnast	D Score	E Score	Pen.	Total
1st place, gold medalist(s)	Hwang Seo-hyun (KOR)	6.6	8.100		14.700
2nd place, silver medalist(s)	Qiu Qiyuan (CHN)	6.4	8.166		14.566
3rd place, bronze medalist(s)	Mana Okamura (JPN)	6.1	8.200		14.300
4	Aiko Sugihara (JPN)	5.7	8.066		13.766
5	Zhang Qingying (CHN)	6.5	7.200		13.700
6	Amanda Yap (SGP)	5.2	7.833		13.033
7	Han Yon-mi (PRK)	5.8	7.200		13.000
8	Pak Un-jong (PRK)	6.1	6.600		12.700
