= Gymnastics at the 2026 Asian Games – Women's floor =

Women's floor at the 2026 Asian Games
- Venue: Nippon Gaishi Hall Rainbow Hall
- Date: 22 September 2026 (Qualification); 25 September 2026 (Final)
- Competitors: 8 from 5 nations

Medalists
gold medal	Aiko Sugihara	Japan
silver medal	Misa Nishiyama	Japan
bronze medal	Zhang Yihan	China

The women's floor competition at the 2026 Asian Games will take place on 25 September 2026 at Nippon Gaishi Hall Rainbow Hall.

== Schedule ==
All times are Japan Standard Time (UTC+09:00)

Date	Time	Event
Tuesday, 22 September 2026	12:00	Qualification
Friday, 25 September 2026	17:30	Final

== Qualification ==
Rank	Gymnast	D Score	E Score	Pen.	Total	Qual.
1	Aiko Sugihara (JPN)	5.9	8.000	-0.2	13.700	Q
2	Misa Nishiyama (JPN)	5.7	7.833	-0.1	13.433	Q
3	Ke Qinqin (CHN)	5.2	8.166		13.366	Q
4	Rina Kishi (JPN)	5.6	7.733		13.333	–
5	Zhang Qingying (CHN)	5.2	8.100		13.300	~~Q~~ WD
6	Zhang Yihan (CHN)	5.7	7.500		13.200	– Sub
7	An Chang-ok (PRK)	5.3	7.800		13.100	Q
8	Dildora Aripova (UZB)	5.1	7.966		13.066	Q
9	Yeo Seo-jeong (KOR)	5.2	7.866		13.066	Q
9	Pak Un-jong (PRK)	5.2	7.866		13.066	Q
11	Haruka Nakamura (JPN)	5.7	7.666	-0.3	13.066	–
12	Qiu Qiyuan (CHN)	5.1	7.933		13.033	–
13	Han Yon-mi (PRK)	5.2	7.833		13.033	–
14	Amanda Yap (SGP)	5.0	7.933		12.933	R1
15	Levi Ruivivar (PHI)	4.9	8.100	-0.1	12.900	R2
16	Lim Su-min (KOR)	5.0	7.800		12.800	R3

== Final ==
Rank	Gymnast	D Score	E Score	Pen.	Total
1st place, gold medalist(s)	Aiko Sugihara (JPN)	5.9	8.233	-0.1	14.033
2nd place, silver medalist(s)	Misa Nishiyama (JPN)	5.9	8.000		13.900
3rd place, bronze medalist(s)	Zhang Yihan (CHN)	6.0	7.566		13.566
4	Dildora Aripova (UZB)	5.1	8.100		13.200
5	Pak Un-jong (PRK)	5.3	7.966	-0.1	13.166
6	Han Yon-mi (PRK)	5.1	7.933		13.033
7	Yeo Seo-jeong (KOR)	5.0	7.966		12.966
8	Ke Qinqin (CHN)	5.0	7.333	-0.3	12.033
