= Gymnastics at the 2026 Asian Games – Women's artistic individual all-around =

Women's individual all-around at the 2026 Asian Games
- Venue: Nippon Gaishi Hall Rainbow Hall
- Date: 22 September 2026

Medalists
gold medal	Aiko Sugihara	Japan
silver medal	Ke Qinqin	China
bronze medal	Misa Nishiyama	Japan

The women's artistic individual all-around competition at the 2026 Asian Games was held on 22 September 2026 at the Nippon Gaishi Hall Rainbow Hall.

== Schedule ==
All times are Japan Standard Time (UTC+09:00)

Date	Time	Event
Tuesday, 22 September 2026	12:00	Final

== Results ==
The all-around final was held with no prior qualification round, therefore all athletes were eligible to participate. Only two gymnasts per NOC were eligible for placement.

Rank	Gymnast	Vault (gymnastics)	Uneven bars	Balance beam	Floor (gymnastics)	Total
1st place, gold medalist(s)	Aiko Sugihara (JPN)	14.100	13.533	14.266	13.700	55.599
2nd place, silver medalist(s)	Ke Qinqin (CHN)	14.033	14.100	13.700	13.366	55.199
3rd place, bronze medalist(s)	Misa Nishiyama (JPN)	13.933	14.533	13.133	13.433	55.032
4	Zhang Qingying (CHN)	13.233	14.266	13.933	13.300	54.732
–	Qiu Qiyuan (CHN)	12.600	13.933	14.833	13.033	54.399
–	Rina Kishi (JPN)	13.966	13.300	13.200	13.333	53.799
5	An Chang-ok (PRK)	14.000	13.766	12.700	13.100	53.566
6	Yeo Seo-jeong (KOR)	14.300	12.800	12.600	13.066	52.766
7	Pak Un-jong (PRK)	12.966	11.866	14.466	13.066	52.364
8	Lim Su-min (KOR)	12.700	11.566	13.200	12.800	50.266
9	Amanda Yap (SGP)	12.966	11.033	13.300	12.933	50.232
10	Levi Ruivivar (PHI)	12.666	13.166	11.333	12.900	50.065
11	Yeap Kang Xian (MAS)	12.933	12.166	12.266	12.400	49.765
–	Lee Yun-seo (KOR)	12.533	13.533	11.466	12.200	49.732
12	Kylee Kvamme (PHI)	13.466	10.100	11.866	12.233	47.665
13	Emma Yap (SGP)	12.400	10.466	12.066	12.500	47.432
14	Lai Pin-ju (TPE)	11.433	10.733	13.133	12.000	47.299
15	Cadence Teh Zi Qi (MAS)	11.800	11.833	11.400	11.900	46.933
–	Alena Tan (SGP)	12.000	11.166	11.533	11.866	46.565
16	Liao Yi-chun (TPE)	12.400	11.100	11.933	11.033	46.466
–	Haylee Garcia (PHI)	12.900	9.566	12.000	11.933	46.399
–	Jo Kyong-byol (PRK)	13.133	9.100	13.033	10.500	45.766
17	Aleksandra Shevchenko (UZB)	12.433	11.300	10.533	11.066	45.332
18	Ameli Mukusheva (KAZ)	11.800	10.666	11.266	11.433	45.165
–	Lin Yi-chen (TPE)	11.500	10.600	11.633	11.400	45.133
19	Chen Hoi-yuen (HKG)	12.833	8.866	11.833	11.533	45.065
20	Kiana Wong (HKG)	11.800	9.433	11.866	11.700	44.799
21	Huỳnh Thiên Lý (VIE)	12.900	10.666	9.466	11.700	44.732
22	Trần Đoàn Quỳnh Nam (VIE)	11.400	10.833	10.500	10.266	42.999
23	Pan Ei Phyu (MYA)	11.966	9.600	9.666	11.233	42.465
24	Anaita Krasnoperova (KGZ)	11.666	7.566	11.066	10.733	41.031
25	Radmila Tarassova (KAZ)	11.500	9.866	9.566	9.966	40.898
26	Dylanov Brahmana (INA)	11.466	8.100	9.800	11.233	40.599
27	Nuyara Fernando (SRI)	12.000	7.933	9.433	9.800	39.166
28	Sara Mroueh (LBN)	11.500	7.000	8.766	10.000	37.266
