= Gymnastics at the 2026 Asian Games – Women's uneven bars =

Women's uneven bars at the 2026 Asian Games
- Venue: Nippon Gaishi Hall Rainbow Hall
- Date: 22 September 2026 (Qualification); 24 September 2026 (Final)
- Competitors: 8 from 5 nations

Medalists
gold medal	Qiu Qiyuan	China
silver medal	Misa Nishiyama	Japan
bronze medal	Zhang Qingying	China

The women's uneven bars competition at the 2026 Asian Games took place on 24 September 2026 at Nippon Gaishi Hall Rainbow Hall.

== Schedule ==
All times are Japan Standard Time (UTC+09:00)

Date	Time	Event
Tuesday, 22 September 2026	12:00	Qualification
Thursday, 24 September 2026	19:45	Final

== Qualification ==
Rank	Gymnast	D Score	E Score	Pen.	Total	Qual.
1	Misa Nishiyama (JPN)	6.2	8.333		14.533	Q
2	Zhang Qingying (CHN)	5.7	8.566		14.266	Q
3	Ke Qinqin (CHN)	5.8	8.300		14.100	~~Q~~ WD
4	Mana Okamura (JPN)	5.7	8.366		14.066	Q
5	Rachel Yeoh Li Wen (MAS)	6.3	7.700		14.000	Q
6	Qiu Qiyuan (CHN)	6.3	7.633		13.933	– Sub
7	An Chang-ok (PRK)	6.1	7.666		13.766	Q
8	Aiko Sugihara (JPN)	5.4	8.133		13.533	–
9	Lee Yun-seo (KOR)	5.7	7.833		13.533	Q
10	Kim Kyong-ryong (PRK)	6.1	7.233		13.333	Q
11	Rina Kishi (JPN)	5.7	7.600		13.300	–
12	Levi Ruivivar (PHI)	5.3	7.866		13.166	R1
13	Yeo Seo-jeong (KOR)	5.0	7.800		12.800	R2
14	Du Siyu (CHN)	5.6	7.033		12.633	–
15	Dildora Aripova (UZB)	5.4	7.200		12.600	R3

== Final ==
Rank	Gymnast	D Score	E Score	Pen.	Total
1st place, gold medalist(s)	Qiu Qiyuan (CHN)	6.7	8.400		15.100
2nd place, silver medalist(s)	Misa Nishiyama (JPN)	6.2	8.233		14.433
3rd place, bronze medalist(s)	Zhang Qingying (CHN)	5.7	8.533		14.233
4	An Chang-ok (PRK)	6.1	8.000		14.100
5	Kim Kyong-ryong (PRK)	6.1	7.866		13.966
6	Lee Yun-seo (KOR)	5.5	7.333		12.833
7	Rachel Yeoh Li Wen (MAS)	5.8	6.933		12.733
8	Mana Okamura (JPN)	5.6	6.633		12.233
