= China at the 2026 Summer Youth Olympics =

- Flag of China
- IOC code: CHN
- NOC: Chinese Olympic Committee
- Website: www.olympic.cn

in Dakar, Senegal October 31, 2026 – November 13, 2026
- Competitors: 66 in 21 sports
- Flag bearers: Chang Mohan & Lin Yilei
- Medals: Gold 17 Silver 8 Bronze 7 Total 32

Summer Youth Olympics appearances (overview)
- 2010; 2014; 2018; 2026

China is scheduled to compete at the 2026 Summer Youth Olympics in Dakar, Senegal from October 31 to November 13, 2026. This will mark China's fourth appearance at the Youth Olympics, after making its debut in 2010.

Swimmer Chang Mohan and wushu taolu athlete Lin Yilei served as the flag bearers for the opening ceremony.

== Competitors ==
The following is the list of number of competitors participating at the Games per sport/discipline.

Sport	Men	Women	Total
3x3 basketball	0	4	4
Artistic gymnastics	3	3	6
Athletics	6	6	12
Badminton	1	1	2
Beach handball	0	10	10
Beach volleyball	0	2	2
Beach wrestling	0	1	1
Boxing	1	1	2
Breaking	1	0	1
Coastal rowing	1	1	2
Equestrian	0	1	1
Fencing	0	1	1
Judo	0	1	1
Rugby sevens	0	12	12
Sailing	0	1	1
Skateboarding	0	1	1
Swimming	1	1	2
Table tennis	1	1	2
Taekwondo	0	1	1
Triathlon	0	1	1
Wushu	1	0	1
Total	16	50	66

== 3x3 basketball ==
China entered a team for the women's tournament as one of the three participating teams from the Asia-Pacific region.

Summary

Event	Pool play			Quarterfinal	Semifinal	Final / BM	
Event	Opposition Score	Opposition Score	Group Rank	Opposition Score	Opposition Score	Opposition Score	Rank
Women's tournament							

Roster

- Gu Manjie
- Sun Hanyun
- Tang Yihan
- Zhu Zihan

== Artistic gymnastics ==
China entered a team of six gymnasts, three per gender.

Boys
Team

Athlete	Event	Qualification								Final							
Athlete	Event	Apparatus						Total	Rank	Apparatus						Total	Rank
Athlete	Event	F	PH	R	V	PB	HB	Total	Rank	F	PH	R	V	PB	HB	Total	Rank
Li Lezheng	Team	12.666	12.833	13.100	13.066	12.400	13.066	77.131	5 Q			12.000		13.266	13.766	—N/a	
Yang Lanbin	Team	13.766	11.766	12.866	14.366	13.433	13.700	79.897	2 Q	13.500	13.233	12.800	13.933	13.400	12.300	—N/a	
Zhao Ruiyang	Team	13.666	12.066	12.100	13.966	12.333	12.066	76.197	7	13.766	12.533		13.966			—N/a	
Total	Team	27.432	24.899	25.966	28.332	25.833	26.766	159.228	1 Q	27.266	25.766	24.800	27.899	26.666	26.066	158.463	1st place, gold medalist(s)

Individual all-around

Athlete	Event	Final							
Athlete	Event	Apparatus						Total	Rank
Athlete	Event	F	PH	R	V	PB	HB	Total	Rank
Li Lezheng	All-around	11.366	11.033	12.700	12.866	13.533	13.466	74.964	6
Yang Lanbin	All-around	14.033	12.500	12.533	13.766	12.500	13.133	78.465	4

Girls
Team

Athlete	Event	Qualification						Final					
Athlete	Event	Apparatus				Total	Rank	Apparatus				Total	Rank
Athlete	Event	V	UB	BB	FX	Total	Rank	V	UB	BB	FX	Total	Rank
Chen Ziyan	Team	12.233	13.533	13.133	12.766	51.665	6			14.266	12.200	—N/a	
Xie Guying	Team	13.033	14.000	13.366	12.700	53.099	1 Q	13.133	14.233		12.833	—N/a	
Zhong Qi	Team	12.966	13.800	14.233	11.933	52.932	2 Q	12.900	14.133	14.100		—N/a	
Total	Team	25.999	27.800	27.599	25.466	106.864	1 Q	26.033	28.366	28.366	25.033	107.798	1st place, gold medalist(s)

Individual all-around

Athlete	Event	Final					
Athlete	Event	Apparatus				Total	Rank
Athlete	Event	V	UB	BB	FX	Total	Rank
Xie Guying	All-around	12.933	13.833	12.100	12.433	51.299	7
Zhong Qi	All-around	12.833	14.533	14.200	11.633	53.199	3rd place, bronze medalist(s)

Mixed
Mixed team

Athlete	Event	Final																				
Athlete	Event	Round 1							Round 2							Round 3						
Athlete	Event	Apparatus					Total	Rank	Apparatus					Total	Rank	Apparatus					Total	Rank
Athlete	Event	F	PB	HB	UB	BB	Total	Rank	F	PB	HB	UB	BB	Total	Rank	F	PB	HB	UB	BB	Total	Rank
Yang Lanbin	Mixed team	—N/a	13.766	—N/a			26.132	2 Q	—N/a		13.166	—N/a		26.666	1 Q	13.966	—N/a				27.832	1st place, gold medalist(s)
Chen Ziyan	Mixed team	12.366	—N/a				26.132	2 Q	—N/a			13.500	—N/a	26.666	1 Q	—N/a				13.866	27.832	1st place, gold medalist(s)

== Athletics ==
China entered a team of twelve athletes, six of each gender.

=== Track & road events ===
Men

Athlete	Event	Heat		Semifinal		Final	
Athlete	Event	Result	Rank	Result	Rank	Result	Rank
Zhang Hangyu	100 m						
Liu Han	400 m						
Chen Shijie	110 m hurdles						
Wang Tengfei	400 m hurdles						

Women

Athlete	Event	Heat		Semifinal		Final	
Athlete	Event	Result	Rank	Result	Rank	Result	Rank
Chen Xinxuan	200 m						
Zhang Keyi	100 m hurdles						
Wang Yaru	5000 m race walk						

=== Field events ===
Men

Athlete	Event	Qualification		Final	
Athlete	Event	Distance	Position	Distance	Position
Liu Sen	High jump				
Sheng Xuefeng	Triple jump				

Women

Athlete	Event	Qualification		Final	
Athlete	Event	Distance	Position	Distance	Position
Liu Lixuan	Long jump				
Wang Changle	Javelin throw				
Yang Xingyue	Hammer throw				

== Badminton ==
China entered one two athletes, one male and one female.

Athlete	Event	Round of 16	Quarterfinals	Semifinals	Final / BM	
Athlete	Event	Opposition Result	Opposition Result	Opposition Result	Opposition Result	Rank
Hong Tianyue	Men's singles					
Zhang Yixin	Women's singles					

== Beach handball ==
China entered a team for the women's tournament.

Summary

Event	Group stage				Quarterfinals	5th–8th Classification	Semifinals	Final / PG / BM	
Event	Opposition Result	Opposition Result	Opposition Result	Rank	Opposition Result	Opposition Result	Opposition Result	Opposition Result	Rank
Men's tournament	Spain	Croatia	Mexico						

Roster

- Dai Jiarong
- Li Lingyu
- Li Xiangman
- Liang Yaxuan
- Liu Congrui
- Lu Yuting
- Sun Ao
- Wang Yiyi
- Yang Shiqi
- Zhao Xi

== Beach volleyball ==
China received a quota place for the women's tournament.

Summary

Team	Event	Group stage				Round of 16	Quarterfinals	Semifinals	Final / PG / BM	
Team	Event	Opposition Result	Opposition Result	Opposition Result	Rank	Opposition Result	Opposition Result	Opposition Result	Opposition Result	Rank
Qi Siyu; Zhuang Ming	Women's tournament									

== Beach wrestling ==
China entered one female athlete.

Women

Athlete	Weight	Round of 16	Quarterfinals	Semifinals	Final / BM	
Athlete	Weight	Opposition Result	Opposition Result	Opposition Result	Opposition Result	Rank
Zhao Min	–75 kg					

== Boxing ==
China entered two athletes, one male and one female.

Men

Athlete	Weight	Round of 16	Quarterfinals	Semifinals	Final / BM	
Athlete	Weight	Opposition Result	Opposition Result	Opposition Result	Opposition Result	Rank
Zhang Zhengkun	–60 kg					

Women

Athlete	Weight	Round of 16	Quarterfinals	Semifinals	Final / BM	
Athlete	Weight	Opposition Result	Opposition Result	Opposition Result	Opposition Result	Rank
Wang Jiaen	–60 kg					

== Breaking ==
China entered one male athlete.

Athlete	Nickname	Event	Group Stage			Quarterfinal	Semifinal	Final / BM	
Athlete	Nickname	Event	Round	Votes	Rank	Opposition Result	Opposition Result	Opposition Result	Rank
	Holy Rain	B-Boys							

== Coastal rowing ==
China entered two rowers, one of each gender.

Athlete	Event	Time Trial 1		Time Trial 2		Round of 16	Quarter-finals	Semi-finals	Final / BM	
Athlete	Event	Opposition Result	Rank	Opposition Result	Rank	Opposition Result	Opposition Result	Opposition Result	Opposition Result	Rank
Su Juntao	Men's solo	2:51.15	16	2:30.95	2 Q	Runin (EST); W 2:23.48–2:24.19	Moursi (EGY); L 2:29.52–2:26.09	Did not advance		
Liu Lili	Women's solo	2:57.89	2 Q	—N/a		Guilloton (FRA); W 2:47.25–3:35.25	Özdemir (TUR); W 2:46.05–3:06.54	Lopez Valera (ESP); W 2:43.60–3:15.50	Gonzalez (ESP); W 2:39.65–2:53.88	Gold medal
Su Juntao; Liu Lili	Mixed double sculls									

== Equestrian ==
China received a quota place as one of the four invited NOCs from Asia.

Athlete	Horse	Event	Qualification		Final			Jump-Off		
Athlete	Horse	Event	Penalties	Rank	Penalties	Time	Rank	Penalties	Time	Rank
Sun Riurui		Individual jumping								

== Fencing ==
China entered one female athlete.

Athlete	Event	Round of 64	Round of 32	Round of 16	Quarterfinal	Semifinal	Final / BM	
Athlete	Event	Opposition Score	Opposition Score	Opposition Score	Opposition Score	Opposition Score	Opposition Score	Rank
Fan Qimiao	Womens' sabre							

== Judo ==
China entered one female judoka based on the available quotas assigned by the International Judo Federation.

Women

Athlete	Event	Round of 16	Quarterfinals	Semifinals	Repechage	Final / BM	
Athlete	Event	Opposition Result	Opposition Result	Opposition Result	Opposition Result	Opposition Result	Rank
Cheng Yue	–78 kg						

== Rugby sevens ==
China entered a team for the women's tournament.

Summary

Event	Group stage				Semifinal	Final / BM	
Event	Opposition Score	Opposition Score	Opposition Score	Group Rank	Opposition Score	Opposition Score	Rank
Women's tournament	Australia	Kenya	Senegal				

Roster

- Guo Xinlei
- He Yuyan
- Hu Yuyan
- Liu Miao
- Liu Yihui
- Lou Jiayi
- Peng Songmei
- Tong Keran
- Yang Yifan
- Zhang Cuijing
- Zhang Menghan
- Zhao Ziyu

== Sailing ==
China entered one female athlete.

Athlete	Event	Opening Series – Points per Race											Total points	Net points	Final rank
Athlete	Event	1	2	3	4	5	6	7	8	9	10	M	Total points	Net points	Final rank
Wu Ziyan	Women's windsurfing														

== Skateboarding ==
China entered one female athlete based on available quotas.

Athlete	Event	Semifinal		Final	
Athlete	Event	Result	Rank	Result	Rank
Zhu Yuanling	Women's street				

== Swimming ==
China entered two swimmers, one male and one female.

Athlete	Event	Heat		Semifinal		Final	
Athlete	Event	Time	Rank	Time	Rank	Time	Rank
Xie Yichen	100 m freestyle						
Xie Yichen	50 m breaststroke						
Xie Yichen	100 m breaststroke						
Xie Yichen	200 m individual medley						
Chang Mohan	200 m freestyle						
Chang Mohan	200 m breaststroke						
Chang Mohan	200 m butterfly						
Chang Mohan	200 m individual medley						

== Table tennis ==
China entered two athletes (one male and one female).

Athlete	Event	Preliminary	Round 1	Round 2	Round 3	Round of 16	Quarterfinals	Semifinals	Final / BM	
Athlete	Event	Opposition Result	Opposition Result	Opposition Result	Opposition Result	Opposition Result	Opposition Result	Opposition Result	Opposition Result	Rank
Li Hechen	Men's singles									
Yao Ruixuan	Women's singles									
Li Hechen; Yao Ruixuan	Mixed doubles									

== Taekwondo ==
China entered one female athlete.

Women

Athlete	Event	Round of 16	Quarterfinals	Semifinals	Repechage	Final / BM	
Athlete	Event	Opposition Result	Opposition Result	Opposition Result	Opposition Result	Opposition Result	Rank
Zhao Yueuannan	–44 kg						

== Triathlon ==
China entered one female athlete.

Athlete	Event	Time						Rank
Athlete	Event	Swim (750m)	Trans 1	Bike (20km)	Trans 2	Run (5km)	Total	Rank
Xu Enge	Women's individual							

== Wushu ==
China entered one male athlete after quotas were assigned by the International Wushu Federation.

Athlete	Event	Changquan routine		Gunshu routine		Total Points	Final Rank
Athlete	Event	Points	Rank	Points	Rank	Total Points	Final Rank
Lin Yilei	Men's changquan combined						
