= Huang Ziyi =

Chinese gymnast

- 黄紫艺
- Born: 7 July 2011 (age 15) Guangdong, China

Gymnastics career
- Discipline: Women's artistic gymnastics
- Country represented: China

Huang Ziyi (Chinese: 黄紫艺, born 7 July 2011) is a Chinese artistic gymnast.

== Career ==
Huang started in gymnastics at the Suicheng Elementary School No. 4.

=== 2025 ===
In May at the 2025 Chinese Artistic Gymnastics Championships, Huang won silver with the (senior) Guangdong Province team and made the final on uneven bars, finishing fourth.

In September at the 2025 Junior National Games, she won the team gold medal with the Guangdong Province team that also included Ke Qinqin, He Xinyu, Zhong Jiatong, Zhong Qi, and Liang Yating. The gold medal became the first for Guangdong at that year's games. Individually, she won the all-around bronze medal.

In November at the 2025 (Adult) National Games, she was part of the (senior) Guangdong Province team that also included Ou Yushan, Hu Jiafei, Ke Qinqin, Zhong Qi, and Peng Zijin and won the team silver medal.

== Competitive history ==
Competitive history of Huang Ziyi
Year	Event	Team	AA	VT	UB	BB	FX
2025	Chinese Championships	2nd place, silver medalist(s)					
2025	Chinese Junior National Games	1st place, gold medalist(s)	3rd place, bronze medalist(s)				
2025	Chinese National Games	2nd place, silver medalist(s)					
