= Athletics at the 2026 Summer Youth Olympics – Men's triple jump =

Men's triple jump athletics event at the 2026 Summer Youth Olympics

Men's triple jump at the IV Summer Youth Olympic Games
- Venue: Complexe Iba Mar Diop
- Date: 10 November
- Competitors: 8 from 8 nations
- Winning time: 16.18 m

Medalists
1st place, gold medalist(s)		Xuefeng Sheng	China
2nd place, silver medalist(s)		Shakhzodbek Kholmurodov	Uzbekistan
3rd place, bronze medalist(s)		João Matos	Portugal

The men's triple jump event at the 2026 Summer Youth Olympics was held on 10 November at the Complexe Iba Mar Diop in Dakar, Senegal.

== Schedule ==
All times are local (UTC±0).

Date	Time	Round
10 November 2026	14:40	Final

== Results ==
=== Final ===
The final began at 14:40 and ended at 15:51 local time. It was contested by eight athletes. The competition was conducted according to the athletics competition regulations for the Games.

Rank	Athlete	Nation	1	2	3	4	5	6	Result	Wind
1st place, gold medalist(s)	Xuefeng Sheng	China	15.60	15.74	x	16.18	–	15.10	16.18	+1.1
2nd place, silver medalist(s)	Shakhzodbek Kholmurodov	Uzbekistan	15.00	15.62	15.71	13.55	15.50	15.60	15.71	+0.1
3rd place, bronze medalist(s)	João Matos	Portugal	15.17	x	14.58	14.93	15.53	13.80	15.53	+1.1
4	Emir Oguz	Turkey	15.07	15.22	14.70	14.24	15.04	14.59	15.22	+0.2
5	Dimitrios Moumouris	Greece	14.40	x	14.76	x	15.20	15.14	15.20	+1.6
6	Djibril Ndiaye	Senegal	x	14.56	15.07	14.98	15.01	14.52	15.07	+2.0
7	Tanatswa Mugwidi	Zimbabwe	x	14.57	13.99	x	14.42	14.39	14.57	-1.0
8	Jaaden Williams	Belize	x	x	x	13.25	x	13.30	13.30	+1.6
