= Artistic gymnastics at the 2026 Summer Youth Olympics – Women's individual all-around =

Artistic gymnastics event at the 2026 Summer Youth Olympics

Girls' All-Around at the IV Summer Youth Olympic Games
- Venue: Dakar Expo Center
- Date: 10 November 2026
- Competitors: 18 from 13 nations
- Winning score: 54.665

Medalists
| 1st place, gold medalist(s) | | Polina Dmitrieva | Russia |
| 2nd place, silver medalist(s) | | Louane Plisson | France |
| 3rd place, bronze medalist(s) | | Zhong Qi | China |

The women's artistic individual all-around at the 2026 Summer Youth Olympics was held on November 10 at the Dakar Expo Center.

== Qualification ==
Eighteen gymnasts qualified into the all-around final with a max of two gymnasts per NOC.

== Medalists ==
| Gold | Silver | Bronze |
|---|---|---|
| Polina Dmitrieva; Russia | Louane Plisson; France | Zhong Qi; China |

== Final ==
| Position | Gymnast | Vault (gymnastics) | Uneven bars | Balance beam | Floor (gymnastics) | Total |
|---|---|---|---|---|---|---|
| 1st place, gold medalist(s) | Polina Dmitrieva (RUS) | 13.066 | 14.500 | 14.133 | 12.966 | 54.665 |
| 2nd place, silver medalist(s) | Louane Plisson (FRA) | 13.333 | 13.666 | 13.833 | 12.833 | 53.665 |
| 3rd place, bronze medalist(s) | Zhong Qi (CHN) | 12.833 | 14.533 | 14.200 | 11.633 | 53.199 |
| 4 | Clarissa Rinaldi (ITA) | 13.133 | 13.500 | 13.700 | 12.733 | 53.066 |
| 5 | Yume Minamino (JPN) | 13.333 | 13.700 | 13.766 | 11.800 | 52.599 |
| 6 | Nanami Togo (JPN) | 13.500 | 13.466 | 12.666 | 12.900 | 52.532 |
| 7 | Xie Guying (CHN) | 12.933 | 13.833 | 12.100 | 12.433 | 51.299 |
| 8 | Helena Finc (GBR) | 13.133 | 12.466 | 12.066 | 12.366 | 50.031 |
| 9 | Lilou Marliac (FRA) | 13.166 | 12.833 | 11.700 | 11.733 | 49.432 |
| 10 | Emma Sneessens (BEL) | 11.833 | 12.866 | 12.633 | 11.733 | 49.065 |
| 11 | Nikita Théodat (CAN) | 13.266 | 12.033 | 10.433 | 12.766 | 48.498 |
| 12 | Olivia Meaney (AUS) | 13.066 | 11.933 | 12.366 | 10.800 | 48.165 |
| 13 | Ophir Shmuely (ISR) | 12.800 | 12.933 | 11.666 | 10.433 | 47.832 |
| 14 | Yana Protsenko (UKR) | 12.766 | 12.466 | 11.633 | 10.933 | 47.798 |
| 15 | Yeva Tatsiyeva (KAZ) | 12.933 | 10.733 | 11.800 | 11.966 | 47.432 |
| 16 | Sofia Frenna (ITA) | 11.300 | 11.366 | 12.066 | 11.666 | 46.398 |
| 17 | Tia El-Midany (EGY) | 12.566 | 9.466 | 12.033 | 12.100 | 46.165 |
| 18 | Alice Johnson (AUS) | 11.600 | 11.233 | 11.033 | 11.500 | 45.366 |
