= 2026 DTB Pokal Stuttgart =

Artistic gymnastics competition

EnBW DTB Pokal 2026
- Venue: Porsche-Arena
- Location: Stuttgart, Germany
- Dates: March 19–22, 2026

The 2026 EnBW DTB Pokal Team Challenge and Mixed Cup was an artistic gymnastics competition held from March 19–22, 2026 at the Porsche-Arena in Stuttgart, Germany. The event consisted of five separate competitions across three days: a team challenge competition for both senior men and women; a team challenge for junior men and women; and a mixed team cup which will was contested between mixed gender senior teams from Canada, Germany, the Switzerland, and Australia.

== Medalists ==
=== Senior ===
Event	Gold	Silver	Bronze
Team Challenge
Men
Team	United States; Jun Iwai; Joshua Karnes; Danila Leykin; Yul Moldauer; Kameron Nelson	Japan; Taiki Kakutani; Sosuke Nishi; Nao Ojima; Ryoke Takahashi	Italy; Yumin Abbadini; Tommaso Brugnami; Edoardo de Rosa; Niccolò Vannucchi; Riccardo Villa
All-around	(Japan) Nao Ojima	(United States) Yul Moldauer	(Switzerland) Noe Seifert
Floor Exercise	(Germany) Timo Eder	(Brazil) Vitaliy Guimaraes	(Japan) Nao Ojima
Pommel Horse	(Canada) Jordan Carroll	(Italy) Yumin Abbadini	(United States) Yul Moldauer
Rings	(United States) Kameron Nelson	(Belgium) Roméo Jost	(Canada) Chris Kaji
Vault	(Ukraine) Nazar Chepurnyi	(Italy) Tommaso Brugnami	(United States) Kameron Nelson
Parallel Bars	(United States) Yul Moldauer	(Brazil) Diogo Soares	(Italy) Yumin Abbadini
Horizontal Bar	(Turkey) Mert Efe Kılıçer	(Japan) Nao Ojima	(Italy) Yumin Abbadini
Women
Team	Canada; Gabrielle Black; Victoriane Charron; Alyssa Guerrier Calixte; Charlotte Raymond; Lia Redick	France; Sarah Ardrino; Noélie Ayuso; Juliette Certain; Romane Hamelin; Alizée Letrange-Mouakit	Australia; Romi Brown; Annabelle Burrows; Emma Morris; Lucy Stewart; Haylee Whitehead
All-around	(Canada) Lia Redick	(Canada) Gabrielle Black	(Belgium) Chloe Baert
Vault	(Canada) Gabrielle Black	(New Zealand) Courtney McGregor	(Australia) Annabelle Burrows
Uneven Bars	(France) Romane Hamelin	(Australia) Romi Brown	(Canada) Charlotte Raymond
Balance Beam	(Canada) Alyssa Guerrier Calixte	(Germany) Janoah Müller	(Australia) Lucy Stewart
Floor Exercise	(Australia) Lucy Stewart	(Netherlands) Yuna Uljee	(France) Noélie Ayuso
Mixed Cup
Team	Germany; Lea Marie Quaas; Karina Schönmaier; Silja Stöhr; Nils Dunkel; Timo Eder; Alexander Kunz	Switzerland; Daria Hartmann; Anastassia Pascu; Samira Raffin; Jan Imhof; Noe Seifert; Dominic Tamsel	Australia; Romi Brown; Annabelle Burrows; Lucy Stewart; Aiden Frick; James Hardy; Ritam Malik

=== Junior ===
Event	Gold	Silver	Bronze
Boys
Team	China; Chen Junji; Jiang Qifeng; Long Houcheng; Tian Shijin; Zheng Baosen	United States; Andres Arranda; Jason Hao; Jakson Kurecki; Bo McCrea; Nixon Miles	Belgium; Ilian Desmet; Arthur Olyslaegers; Noé Strypstein; Arnaud Vanassche; Henri Vanassche
All-around	(China) Long Houcheng	(United States) Jason Hao	(China) Chen Junji
Floor Exercise	(United States) Bo McCrea	(China) Tian Shijin	(Ukraine) Volodymyr Golovin
Pommel Horse	(Ukraine) Volodymyr Golovin	(Kazakhstan) Artyom Kovalyov	(China) Long Houcheng
Rings	(Mexico) Lorenzo Zaragoza	(China) Chen Junji	(Turkey) Deniz Sükrüoglu
Vault	(India) Harschit Damodharan	(Hungary) Aron Horvath	(United States) Bo McCrea
Parallel Bars	(Ukraine) Volodymyr Golovin	(United States) Jason Hao	(China) Zheng Baosen
Horizontal Bar	(Belgium) Noé Strypstein	(United States) Jason Hao	(Austria) Jeremy Balazs
Girls
Team	China; He Junnuo; He Xinyu; Xiang Yina; Yang Xinyi; Zhang Shuchang	Japan; Hirano Minori; Iwase Hikari; Kanon Nakashima; Shibaya Ayaka	Canada; Marion Desjardins; Mackenzie Grant; Taya Macey; Maryam Saber; Nikita Théodat
All-around	(Japan) Kanon Nakashima	(China) He Xinyu	(China) Zhang Shuchang
Vault	(Japan) Iwase Hikari	(Germany) Luna Zimmermann	(Canada) Nikita Théodat
Uneven Bars	(Japan) Kanon Nakashima	(China) Xiang Yina	(Germany) Elizaveta Kharitonova
Balance Beam	(China) He Xinyu	(Japan) Kanon Nakashima	(Germany) Maha Feniuk
Floor Exercise	(Australia) Madelyn Fazio	(Canada) Nikita Théodat	(Austria) Larissa Szanwald
