= He Xinyu =

Chinese gymnast

- 何欣玙
- Born: August 2012 (age 14) Hubei, China

Gymnastics career
- Discipline: Women's artistic gymnastics
- Country represented: China
Medal record
Representing China
Junior Asian Championships
Gold medal – first place	2026 Zunyi	Team
Bronze medal – third place	2026 Zunyi	Vault

He Xinyu (Chinese: 何欣玙, born August 2012) is a Chinese artistic gymnast.

== Career ==
He Xinyu was born in the Hubei province, China, but represents the Guangdong province. She has a twin sister, He Junnuo (Chinese: 何君诺), who is also an artistic gymnast. Both train at the Shenzhen Sports School in Shenzhen City. In the spring of 2026, they were together on the Chinese team that won gold at the DTB Cup Invitational in Stuttgart, Germany.

=== 2025 ===
In September at the 2025 Junior National Games, He Xinyu won the team gold medal with the Guangdong province team that also included Huang Ziyi, Ke Qinqin, Zhong Jiatong, Zhong Qi, and Liang Yating. The gold medal became the first for Guangdong at that year's games.

=== 2026 ===
In March at the 2026 DTB Pokal in Stuttgart, Germany, He Xinyu won team gold with the Chinese junior team that also included her twin sister Junnuo. Individually, she won the all-around silver and the balance beam gold.

In June at the 2026 Asian Women's Artistic Gymnastics Championships, she was part of the Chinese junior team that won gold in the team event. Individually, she won bronze on vault.

== Competitive history ==
Competitive history of He Xinyu
Year	Event	Team	AA	VT	UB	BB	FX
2025	Chinese Junior National Games	1st place, gold medalist(s)					
2026	DTB Pokal Team Challenge (Junior)	1st place, gold medalist(s)	2nd place, silver medalist(s)			1st place, gold medalist(s)	
2026	Asian Junior Championships	1st place, gold medalist(s)		3rd place, bronze medalist(s)			
