= Gymnastics at the 2024 Summer Olympics – Women's uneven bars =

Women's uneven bars at the Games of the XXXIII Olympiad
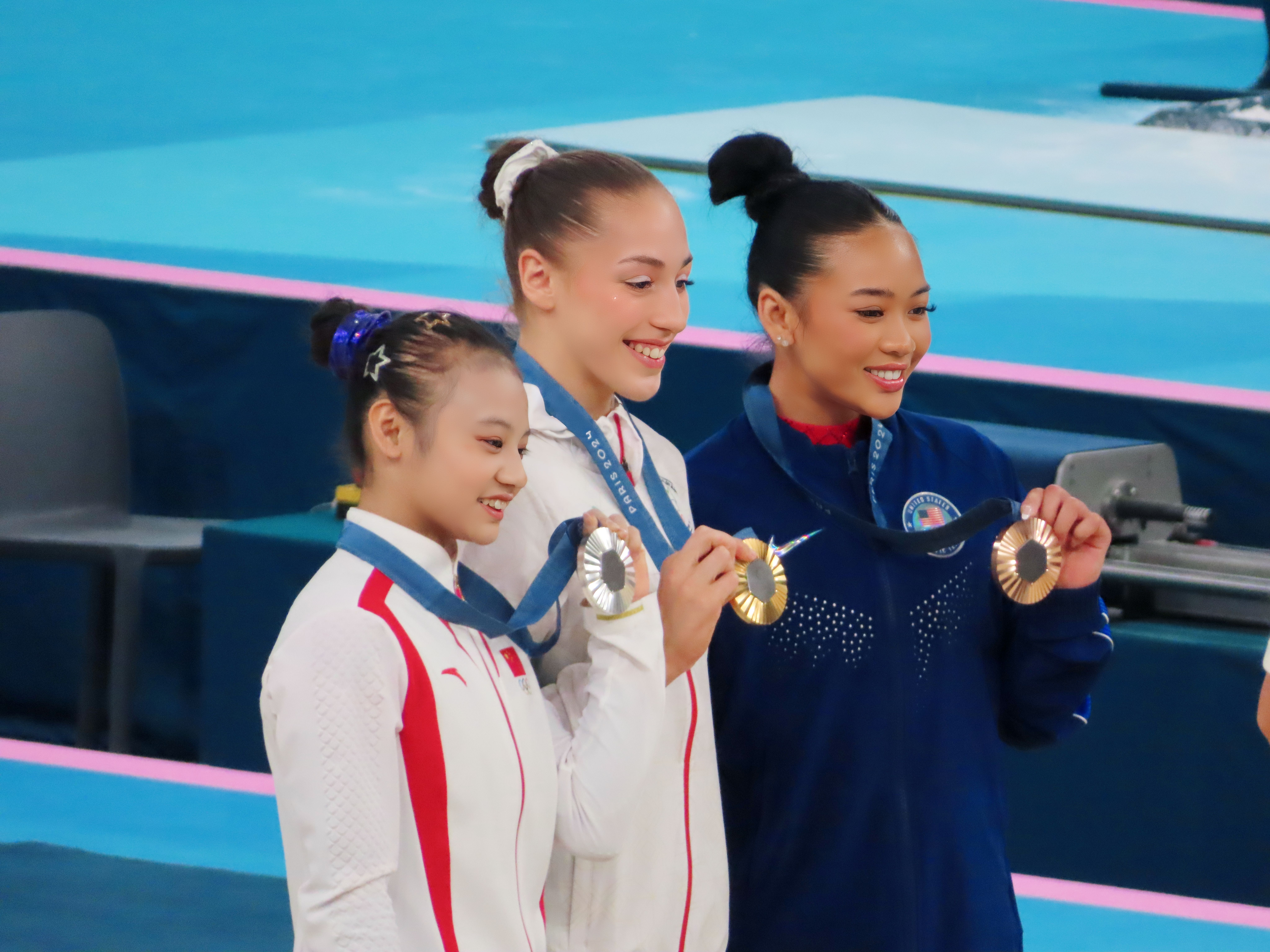
- Qiu, Nemour, and Lee on the medal podium
- Venue: Accor Arena
- Dates: 28 July 2024 (qualifying); 4 August 2024 (final)
- Competitors: 8 from 7 nations
- Winning score: 15.700

Medalists
1st place, gold medalist(s)		Kaylia Nemour	Algeria
2nd place, silver medalist(s)		Qiu Qiyuan	China
3rd place, bronze medalist(s)		Sunisa Lee	United States

The women's uneven bars event at the 2024 Summer Olympics was held on 28 July and 4 August 2024 at the Accor Arena (referred to as the Bercy Arena due to IOC sponsorship rules). 80 gymnasts from 35 nations (of the 95 total gymnasts) competed on uneven bars in the qualifying round.In this event, Kaylia Nemour became the first gymnast from Africa to win an Olympic medal, while also becoming the first Olympic champion in the history of gymnastics to come from the continent.

== Background ==
This was the 20th appearance of the event, after making its debut at the 1952 Summer Olympics. Both the 2020 gold medalist Nina Derwael and bronze medalist Sunisa Lee qualified for the event finals. It was the only event both Simone Biles and Rebeca Andrade did not qualify for.

== Qualification ==
A National Olympic Committee (NOC) could enter up to 5 qualified gymnasts. A total of 95 quota places are allocated to women's artistic gymnastics.

The 12 teams that qualified were able to send 5 gymnasts in the team competition, for a total of 60 of the 95 quota places. The top three teams at the 2022 World Artistic Gymnastics Championships (the United States, Great Britain, and Canada) and the top nine teams (excluding those already qualified) at the 2023 World Artistic Gymnastics Championships (China, Brazil, Italy, the Netherlands, France, Japan, Australia, Romania, and South Korea) earned team qualification places.

The remaining 35 quota places are awarded individually. Each gymnast can only earn one places. These places are filled through various criteria based on the 2023 World Championships, the 2024 FIG Artistic Gymnastics World Cup series, continental championships, a reallocation guarantee and a Tripartite Commission invitation.

Each of the 95 qualified gymnasts are eligible for the uneven bars competition, but many gymnasts do not compete in each of the apparatus events.

== Competition format ==
The top 8 qualifiers in the qualification phase (limit two per NOC) advanced to the apparatus final. The finalists performed on the uneven bars again. Qualification scores were then ignored, with only final round scores counting.

== Schedule ==
Date	Time	Round	Subdivision
28 July	09:30	Qualification	Subdivision 1
28 July	11:40	Qualification	Subdivision 2
28 July	14:50	Qualification	Subdivision 3
28 July	18:00	Qualification	Subdivision 4
28 July	21:10	Qualification	Subdivision 5
4 August	15:40	Final	–
All times are Central European Summer Time (UTC+02:00)

== Results ==
=== Qualifying ===
The gymnasts who ranked in the top eight qualified for the final round. In a case where more than two gymnasts from the same NOC were in the top eight, the last ranked among them would not qualify to final round. The next-best ranked gymnast would qualify instead.

Rank	Gymnast	D Score	E Score	Pen.	Total	Qual.
1	Kaylia Nemour (ALG)	7.1	8.500		15.600	Q
2	Qiu Qiyuan (CHN)	6.8	8.266		15.066	Q
3	Sunisa Lee (USA)	6.4	8.466		14.866	Q
4	Nina Derwael (BEL)	6.5	8.233		14.733	Q
5	Zhang Yihan (CHN)	6.4	8.300		14.700	Q
6	Alice D'Amato (ITA)	6.3	8.366		14.666	Q
7	Becky Downie (GBR)	6.6	8.066		14.666	Q
8	Helen Kevric (GER)	6.2	8.400		14.600	Q
9	Simone Biles (USA)	6.2	8.233		14.433	R1
10	Rebeca Andrade (BRA)	6.1	8.300		14.400	R2
11	Sanna Veerman (NED)	6.4	8.000		14.400	R3

Reserves

The reserves for the uneven bars event final were:

1. Simone Biles (USA)
2. Rebeca Andrade (BRA)
3. Sanna Veerman (NED)

=== Final ===
Nemour's gold medal winning routine

Rank	Gymnast	D Score	E Score	Pen.	Total
1st place, gold medalist(s)	Kaylia Nemour (ALG)	7.2	8.500		15.700
2nd place, silver medalist(s)	Qiu Qiyuan (CHN)	7.2	8.300		15.500
3rd place, bronze medalist(s)	Sunisa Lee (USA)	6.4	8.400		14.800
4	Nina Derwael (BEL)	6.5	8.266		14.766
5	Alice D'Amato (ITA)	6.4	8.333		14.733
6	Helen Kevric (GER)	6.4	8.166		14.566
7	Becky Downie (GBR)	6.5	7.133		13.633
8	Zhang Yihan (CHN)	6.1	6.700		12.800
