= Kanon Nakashima =

Japanese artistic gymnast (born 2011)

- 中島 叶夢
- Born: 21 January 2011 (age 15)

Gymnastics career
- Discipline: Women's artistic gymnastics
- Country represented: Japan
- Club: Let’s Gymnastics
Medal record
Representing Japan
Youth Olympic Games
Silver medal – second place	2026 Dakar	Team

Kanon Nakashima (Japanese: 中島 叶夢; born 21 January 2011) is a Japanese artistic gymnast. She represented Japan at the 2026 Summer Youth Olympics and won a silver medal in the team event. She won three medals at the 2026 Junior Asian Championships.

== Gymnastics career ==
Nakashima finished 50th in the all-around at the 2024 All-Japan Junior Championships. She then improved to 28th place at the 2025 All-Japan Junior Championships. She competed at the 2025 Japanese National Sports Festival and finished sixth in the junior all-around. She helped the Let’s Gymnastics club win the bronze medal at the 2025 All-Japan Team Championships.

Nakashima made her international debut at the 2026 DTB Pokal Stuttgart and won the junior all-around title. She then won another gold medal in the uneven bars final and a silver medal in the balance beam final, behind He Xinyu. She also won a silver medal in the team competition. She then placed seventh in the all-around at the 2026 All-Japan Championships, and she placed ninth at the NHK Trophy. She competed at the 2026 Junior Asian Gymnastics Championships and won silver in the team competition. She also won bronze on both the uneven bars and the balance beam. In November 2026, she represented Japan at the 2026 Summer Youth Olympics. She helped Japan qualify in second place in the team competition. Individually, she finished in eighth during the all-around qualification with 51.332 points. However, she didn't advance to the event final since Japan already qualified two gymnasts. During the inaugural team final, she helped Japan win silver with a total score of 107.564, only 0.234 points behind China. After the team final, Nakashima said, "we are a little frustrated because we lost a very tight match with China, but we were very happy with our performance".

== Competitive history ==
Competitive history of Kanon Nakashima
Year	Event	Team	AA	VT	UB	BB	FX
2026	DTB Pokal Stuttgart	2nd place, silver medalist(s)	1st place, gold medalist(s)		1st place, gold medalist(s)	2nd place, silver medalist(s)	
2026	All-Japan Championships		7				
2026	NHK Trophy		9				
2026	Junior Asian Championships	2nd place, silver medalist(s)			3rd place, bronze medalist(s)	3rd place, bronze medalist(s)	
2026	Youth Olympic Games	2nd place, silver medalist(s)					
