= 2026 Asian Women's Artistic Gymnastics Championships =

Gymnastics event in China

2026 Asian Artistic Gymnastics Championships
- Venue: Zunyi Olympic Sports Centre Stadium
- Location: Zunyi, China
- Start date: 25 June 2026
- End date: 28 June 2026

The 2026 Asian Women's Artistic Gymnastics Championships was the 13th edition of the Senior Asian Artistic Gymnastics Championships and 19th Junior Asian Gymnastics Championships, held in Zunyi, China from 25 to 28 June 2026.

== Participating countries ==
- China
- Chinese Taipei
- Hong Kong
- India
- Indonesia
- Iran
- Japan
- Jordan
- Kazakhstan
- Kyrgyzstan
- Lebanon
- Malaysia
- Myanmar
- North Korea
- Philippines
- Qatar
- Singapore
- South Korea
- Sri Lanka
- Uzbekistan
- Vietnam

== Medal summary ==
Event	Gold	Silver	Bronze
Senior
Team all-around	China; Du Siyu; Ke Qinqin; Qiu Qiyuan; Zhang Qingying; Zhang Yihan; Qin Xinyi	Japan; Rina Kishi; Shoko Miyata; Misa Nishiyama; Mana Okamura; Aiko Sugihara	South Korea; Hwang Seo-hyun; Lee Yun-seo; Lim Su-min; Park Na-young; Yeo Seo-jeong
Individual all-around	(China) Ke Qinqin	(China) Zhang Qingying	(Japan) Misa Nishiyama
Vault	(South Korea) Yeo Seo-jeong	(North Korea) An Chang-ok	(Japan) Shoko Miyata
Uneven bars	(China) Qiu Qiyuan	(China) Du Siyu	(Japan) Misa Nishiyama
Balance beam	(China) Zhang Qingying	(China) Ke Qinqin	(South Korea) Hwang Seo-hyun
Floor exercise	(China) Zhang Yihan	(Japan) Aiko Sugihara	(China) Zhang Qingying
Junior
Team all-around	China; Chen Ziyan; He Xinyu; Xie Guying; Yu Wenjing; Zhong Qi; Zhang Shuchang	Japan; Yume Minamino; Kanon Nakashima; Risora Ogawa; Nanami Togo; Kisaki Tomioka	Kazakhstan; Saida Kassymzhanova; Yekaterina Lebed; Ulyana Pukhova; Ilana Razdykova; Yeva Tatsiyeva
Individual all-around	(China) Zhong Qi	(China) Chen Ziyan	(Japan) Yume Minamino
Vault	(China) Xie Guying	(Japan) Yume Minamino	(China) He Xinyu
Uneven bars	(China) Xie Guying	(China) Zhong Qi	(Japan) Kanon Nakashima
Balance beam	(China) Chen Ziyan	(China) Zhong Qi	(Japan) Kanon Nakashima
Floor exercise	(Japan) Risora Ogawa (Japan) Nanami Togo	Not awarded	(China) Zhong Qi

== Senior results ==
=== Team all-around ===
The qualification round served as the team event, with no designated team final. Below are the top eight teams.

Rank	Team	Vault (gymnastics)	Uneven bars	Balance beam	Floor (gymnastics)	Total
1st place, gold medalist(s)	China	40.333 (2)	43.233 (1)	44.899 (1)	40.033 (1)	168.498
1st place, gold medalist(s)	Zhang Qingying	12.900	14.133	15.333	13.300	168.498
1st place, gold medalist(s)	Ke Qinqin	13.733	14.400	14.933	13.233	168.498
1st place, gold medalist(s)	Zhang Yihan	12.400		13.500	13.500	168.498
1st place, gold medalist(s)	Du Siyu	13.700	14.700			168.498
1st place, gold medalist(s)	Qiu Qiyuan		13.833	14.633		168.498
2nd place, silver medalist(s)	Japan	41.599 (1)	41.366 (2)	40.799 (2)	39.732 (2)	163.649
2nd place, silver medalist(s)	Misa Nishiyama	13.700	13.933	14.133	13.033	163.649
2nd place, silver medalist(s)	Rina Kishi	13.900	13.433	12.733	12.700	163.649
2nd place, silver medalist(s)	Mana Okamura		14.000	13.266	13.366	163.649
2nd place, silver medalist(s)	Aiko Sugihara	13.966		13.400	13.333	163.649
2nd place, silver medalist(s)	Shoko Miyata	13.733	13.300			163.649
3rd place, bronze medalist(s)	South Korea	40.033 (3)	38.599 (4)	39.499 (3)	38.432 (3)	156.563
3rd place, bronze medalist(s)	Yeo Seo-jeong	14.300	12.900	12.233	12.933	156.563
3rd place, bronze medalist(s)	Lee Yun-seo	11.566	12.766	13.200	12.866	156.563
3rd place, bronze medalist(s)	Park Na-young	12.933	12.566	11.900	12.333	156.563
3rd place, bronze medalist(s)	Hwang Seo-hyun			14.066		156.563
3rd place, bronze medalist(s)	Lim Su-min	12.800	12.933		12.633	156.563
4	North Korea	39.765 (4)	40.199 (3)	39.266 (4)	36.966 (5)	156.196
4	An Chang-ok	13.566	13.866	12.433	12.800	156.196
4	Jo Kyong-byol	13.533	12.833	12.700	12.266	156.196
4	Pak Un-jong		12.566	13.533	11.166	156.196
4	Chon Jin-a	12.066		13.033	11.900	156.196
4	Kim Kyong-ryong	12.666	13.500			156.196
5	Malaysia	37.533 (9)	37.266 (5)	37.365 (7)	35.799 (7)	147.983
5	Rachel Yeoh Li Wen		13.133	12.133		147.983
5	Yeap Kang Xian	12.900	12.000	12.966	11.833	147.983
5	Cadence Teh Zi Qi	12.033	12.133	12.266	12.033	147.983
5	Marissa Zaiful Azian	12.600			11.800	147.983
5	Hannah Seow	11.866	11.133	11.133	11.933	147.983
6	Uzbekistan	37.965 (8)	34.665 (6)	36.832 (9)	37.098 (4)	146.560
6	Oksana Chusovitina	13.066				146.560
6	Dildora Aripova	12.366	11.766	12.433	12.566	146.560
6	Aleksandra Shevchenko	12.100	11.533	12.633	12.166	146.560
6	Solikha Tursunboeva	12.533	10.300	11.766	12.366	146.560
6	Odinakhon Robidjonova		11.366	11.533	12.000	146.560
7	Chinese Taipei	38.132 (7)	33.699 (7)	38.466 (5)	35.099 (9)	145.396
7	Ting Hua-tien	11.866	11.966	12.800	11.733	145.396
7	Lai Pin-ju	12.833	11.000	13.033	12.000	145.396
7	Liao Yi-chun	12.633	9.366	12.233	11.000	145.396
7	Yang Ko-wen	12.666	10.733	12.633	11.366	145.396
8	Singapore	37.199 (10)	33.032 (8)	36.932 (8)	35.033 (10)	142.196
8	Amanda Yap	12.933	9.433	13.700	12.600	142.196
8	Gayle Ng	12.166			11.200	142.196
8	Emma Goh	11.166	10.066	11.766	11.233	142.196
8	Ariel Lin Jing Han		11.200	11.466		142.196
8	Alena Tan	12.100	11.766	10.466	11.166	142.196

=== Individual all-around ===
The qualification round served as the all-around competition, with no designated all-around final. Below are the top eight gymnasts.

Rank	Gymnast	Vault (gymnastics)	Uneven bars	Balance beam	Floor (gymnastics)	Total
1st place, gold medalist(s)	(China) Ke Qinqin	13.733	14.400	14.933	13.233	56.299
2nd place, silver medalist(s)	(China) Zhang Qingying	12.900	14.133	15.333	13.300	55.666
3rd place, bronze medalist(s)	(Japan) Misa Nishiyama	13.700	13.933	14.133	13.033	54.799
4	(Japan) Rina Kishi	13.900	13.433	12.733	12.700	52.766
5	(North Korea) An Chang-ok	13.566	13.866	12.433	12.800	52.665
6	(South Korea) Yeo Seo-jeong	14.300	12.900	12.233	12.933	52.366
7	(North Korea) Jo Kyong-byol	13.533	12.833	12.700	12.266	51.332
8	(South Korea) Lee Yun-seo	11.566	12.766	13.200	12.866	50.398

=== Vault ===
Rank	Gymnast	Vault 1				Vault 2				Bonus	Total
Rank	Gymnast	D Score	E Score	Pen.	Score 1	D Score	E Score	Pen.	Score 2	Bonus	Total
1st place, gold medalist(s)	(South Korea) Yeo Seo-jeong	5.4	8.933		14.333	5.0	8.966		13.966	0.2	14.349
2nd place, silver medalist(s)	(North Korea) An Chang-ok	5.6	8.466		14.066	5.4	8.333	-0.3	13.433	0.2	13.949
3rd place, bronze medalist(s)	(Japan) Shoko Miyata	5.0	8.833		13.833	4.8	8.633		13.433	0.2	13.833
4	(North Korea) Jo Kyong-byol	5.4	8.333		13.733	5.0	8.566	-0.1	13.466	0.2	13.799
5	(China) Du Siyu	5.0	8.733		13.733	4.0	8.766		12.766	0.2	13.499
6	(Vietnam) Nguyễn Thị Quỳnh Như	5.2	8.633	-0.3	13.533	4.0	8.666		12.666	0.2	13.299
7	(India) Pranati Nayak	4.4	8.500		12.900	4.4	8.400	-0.1	12.700	0.2	13.000
8	(Uzbekistan) Oksana Chusovitina	4.4	8.533		12.933	4.0	8.533		12.533	0.2	12.933

=== Uneven bars ===
Rank	Gymnast	D Score	E Score	Pen.	Total
1st place, gold medalist(s)	(China) Qiu Qiyuan	6.5	8.333		14.833
2nd place, silver medalist(s)	(China) Du Siyu	6.4	8.000		14.400
3rd place, bronze medalist(s)	(Japan) Misa Nishiyama	6.5	7.700		14.200
4	(Japan) Mana Okamura	5.8	7.900		13.700
5	(North Korea) An Chang-ok	6.0	7.466		13.466
6	(North Korea) Kim Kyong-ryong	6.1	7.366		13.466
7	(Malaysia) Rachel Yeoh Li Wen	5.7	7.733		13.433
8	(South Korea) Lim Su-min	5.0	6.800		11.800

=== Balance beam ===
Rank	Gymnast	D Score	E Score	Pen.	Total
1st place, gold medalist(s)	(China) Zhang Qingying	6.9	8.366		15.266
2nd place, silver medalist(s)	(China) Ke Qinqin	6.7	8.400		15.100
3rd place, bronze medalist(s)	(South Korea) Hwang Seo-hyun	6.5	8.233		14.733
4	(Japan) Misa Nishiyama	5.8	8.266		14.066
5	(Japan) Aiko Sugihara	5.4	8.000		13.400
6	(Singapore) Amanda Yap	5.2	7.933		13.133
7	(South Korea) Lee Yun-seo	5.0	7.866		12.866
8	(North Korea) Pak Un-jong	5.9	6.133		12.033

=== Floor exercise ===
Rank	Gymnast	D Score	E Score	Pen.	Total
1st place, gold medalist(s)	(China) Zhang Yihan	5.9	8.166		14.066
2nd place, silver medalist(s)	(Japan) Aiko Sugihara	5.7	8.200		13.900
3rd place, bronze medalist(s)	(China) Zhang Qingying	5.2	8.166		13.366
4	(Japan) Mana Okamura	5.4	7.966		13.366
5	(Singapore) Amanda Yap	4.8	7.666		12.466
6	(South Korea) Yeo Seo-jeong	5.1	7.566	-0.3	12.366
7	(South Korea) Lee Yun-seo	4.8	7.200		12.000
8	(North Korea) An Chang-ok	5.0	6.500		11.500

== Junior results ==
=== Team all-around ===
The qualification round served as the team event, with no designated team final. Below are the top eight teams.

Rank	Team	Vault (gymnastics)	Uneven bars	Balance beam	Floor (gymnastics)	Total
1st place, gold medalist(s)	China	39.433 (1)	43.066 (1)	41.765 (1)	39.299 (2)	163.563
1st place, gold medalist(s)	Zhong Qi	12.900	14.700	14.166	13.033	163.563
1st place, gold medalist(s)	Xie Guying	13.733	14.500	11.900	13.433	163.563
1st place, gold medalist(s)	Chen Ziyan	12.800	13.866	14.466	12.833	163.563
1st place, gold medalist(s)	Yu Wenjing			13.133	12.000	163.563
1st place, gold medalist(s)	He Xinyu	12.733	13.566			163.563
2nd place, silver medalist(s)	Japan	38.999 (2)	39.465 (2)	49.533 (2)	39.332 (1)	157.329
2nd place, silver medalist(s)	Yume Minamino	13.133	13.766	13.533	12.600	157.329
2nd place, silver medalist(s)	Kisaki Tomioka	12.866	11.866	11.233	11.666	157.329
2nd place, silver medalist(s)	Kanon Nakashima	12.833	13.833	13.600		157.329
2nd place, silver medalist(s)	Nanami Togo		10.533	12.400	13.066	157.329
2nd place, silver medalist(s)	Risora Ogawa	13.000			13.666	157.329
3rd place, bronze medalist(s)	Kazakhstan	37.632 (3)	33.099 (3)	36.666 (3)	37.065 (3)	144.462
3rd place, bronze medalist(s)	Yeva Tatsiyeva	12.733	9.400	12.133	12.533	144.462
3rd place, bronze medalist(s)	Ilana Razdykova		11.700			144.462
3rd place, bronze medalist(s)	Ulyana Pukhova	12.533	10.333	12.000	12.266	144.462
3rd place, bronze medalist(s)	Yekaterina Lebed	12.366		12.533	12.266	144.462
3rd place, bronze medalist(s)	Saida Kassymzhanova	11.900	11.066	11.833	12.200	144.462
4	Chinese Taipei	35.566 (6)	30.899 (4)	33.366 (5)	36.199 (4)	136.030
4	Chou Mei	11.900	10.733	12.266	11.333	136.030
4	Lin Pei-han	11.066	9.900	10.133	12.433	136.030
4	Chen Luo-zhen		8.966	10.200	12.166	136.030
4	Lee Po-hsin	11.866	10.266			136.030
4	Kuo Re-yu	11.800		10.900	11.600	136.030
5	Uzbekistan	33.966 (9)	27.866 (8)	34.999 (4)	35.333 (5)	132.164
5	Yaroslava Chernobrovkina	11.200	9.633	12.266	12.233	132.164
5	Asliyakhon Abdukadirova	11.666	9.900	11.633	11.500	132.164
5	Amina Isroilova	11.100	8.333	11.100	11.600	132.164
6	Philippines	35.832 (5)	28.999 (6)	32.499 (7)	34.099 (6)	131.429
6	Tchelzy Mei Maayo	12.733	9.200	11.866	11.633	131.429
6	Jellian Bantilan	11.533	9.266	9.566	11.866	131.429
6	Maxine Bondoc		10.533	10.200		131.429
6	Maria Pasco	11.566	8.633	10.433	10.166	131.429
6	Aluna Labrador	11.433			10.600	131.429
7	Singapore	35.166 (8)	29.166 (5)	33.299 (6)	31.732 (8)	129.363
7	Emmanuelle Tan	11.933	10.566	12.133	11.333	129.363
7	Rui Lye	11.800	9.300	11.000	10.266	129.363
7	Lydia Teo	11.433	9.300	10.166	10.133	129.363
7	Joan Ng		7.300	7.933	9.866	129.363
8	South Korea	35.965 (4)	28.333 (7)	31.099 (8)	31.362 (9)	127.029
8	Kang Julia	11.666	8.833	9.466	11.266	127.029
8	Lee Hye-jin	12.633	9.533	11.033	9.833	127.029
8	Yoo Young-hyeon	11.400	9.400	10.600	10.533	127.029
8	Lee Hyun-ji	11.666	9.400	9.166	9.366	127.029

=== Individual all-around ===
The qualification round served as the all-around event, with no designated all-around final. Below are the top eight gymnasts.

Rank	Gymnast	Vault (gymnastics)	Uneven bars	Balance beam	Floor (gymnastics)	Total
1st place, gold medalist(s)	(China) Zhong Qi	12.900	14.700	14.166	13.033	54.799
2nd place, silver medalist(s)	(China) Chen Ziyan	12.800	13.866	14.466	12.833	53.965
3rd place, bronze medalist(s)	(Japan) Yume Minamino	13.133	13.766	13.533	12.600	53.032
4	(Japan) Kisaki Tomioka	12.866	11.866	11.233	11.666	47.631
5	(Kazakhstan) Ulyana Pukhova	12.533	10.333	12.000	12.266	47.132
6	(Kazakhstan) Saida Kassymzhanova	11.900	11.066	11.833	12.200	46.999
7	(Chinese Taipei) Chou Mei	11.900	10.733	12.266	11.333	46.232
8	(Singapore) Emmanuelle Tan	11.933	10.566	12.133	11.333	45.965

=== Vault ===
Rank	Gymnast	Vault 1				Vault 2				Total
Rank	Gymnast	D Score	E Score	Pen.	Score 1	D Score	E Score	Pen.	Score 2	Total
1st place, gold medalist(s)	(China) Xie Guying	5.0	9.000		14.000	4.2	9.066		13.266	14.633
2nd place, silver medalist(s)	(Japan) Yume Minamino	4.6	8.766		13.366	5.0	8.533		13.533	13.499
3rd place, bronze medalist(s)	(China) He Xinyu	4.4	8.833		13.233	4.0	8.666		12.666	12.949
4	(Philippines) Tchelzy Mei Maayo	4.2	8.733		12.933	3.6	8.833		12.433	12.683
5	(South Korea) Lee Hye-jin	4.2	8.700		12.900	3.8	8.566		12.366	12.633
5	(Kazakhstan) Yeva Tatsiyeva	4.2	8.666		12.866	3.8	8.600		12.400	12.633
7	(Kazakhstan) Yekaterina Lebed	3.8	8.533		12.333	4.0	8.533		12.533	12.433
8	(Kyrgyzstan) Saikal Mamasharipova	3.4	8.500		11.900	3.6	8.666		12.266	12.083

=== Uneven bars ===
Rank	Gymnast	D Score	E Score	Pen.	Total
1st place, gold medalist(s)	(China) Xie Guying	6.1	8.400		14.500
2nd place, silver medalist(s)	(China) Zhong Qi	6.2	7.933		14.133
3rd place, bronze medalist(s)	(Japan) Kanon Nakashima	5.7	8.133		13.833
4	(Japan) Yume Minamino	5.8	7.833		13.633
5	(Kazakhstan) Ilana Razdykova	4.6	7.333		11.933
6	(Chinese Taipei) Chou Mei	4.1	7.733		11.833
7	(Kazakhstan) Saida Kassymzhanova	4.0	7.200		11.200
8	(Singapore) Emmanuelle Tan	2.9	7.600		10.500

=== Balance beam ===
Rank	Gymnast	D Score	E Score	Pen.	Total
1st place, gold medalist(s)	(China) Chen Ziyan	6.6	8.000		14.600
2nd place, silver medalist(s)	(China) Zhong Qi	5.8	7.966	-0.1	13.666
3rd place, bronze medalist(s)	(Japan) Kanon Nakashima	5.4	8.200		13.600
4	(Japan) Yume Minamino	5.6	7.933		13.533
5	(Chinese Taipei) Chou Mei	5.0	7.600		12.600
6	(Uzbekistan) Yaroslava Chernobrovkina	4.6	6.700		11.300
7	(Kazakhstan) Yekaterina Lebed	4.2	7.100	-0.1	11.200
8	(Singapore) Emmanuelle Tan	4.5	6.433		10.933

=== Floor exercise ===
Rank	Gymnast	D Score	E Score	Pen.	Total
1st place, gold medalist(s)	(Japan) Risora Ogawa	5.4	8.066		13.466
1st place, gold medalist(s)	(Japan) Nanami Togo	5.4	8.066		13.466
3rd place, bronze medalist(s)	(China) Zhong Qi	4.9	8.166		13.066
4	(China) Xie Guying	5.2	7.866	-0.1	12.966
5	(Uzbekistan) Yaroslava Chernobrovkina	4.3	7.600		11.900
6	(Chinese Taipei) Lin Pei-han	4.4	7.400	-0.1	11.700
7	(Kazakhstan) Yeva Tatsiyeva	4.8	6.866		11.666
8	(Kazakhstan) Ulyana Pukhova	4.2	6.266		10.466
