= Artistic gymnastics at the 2026 Summer Youth Olympics – Women's team all-around =

Artistic gymnastics event at the 2026 Summer Youth Olympics

Women's artistic team all-around at the IV Summer Youth Olympic Games
- Venue: Dakar Expo Center
- Date: 8 November 2026 (qualifying); 9 November 2026 (final)
- Competitors: 24 from 8 nations
- Winning total: 107.798

Medalists
1st place, gold medalist(s)		Chen Ziyan; Xie Guying; Zhong Qi	China
2nd place, silver medalist(s)		Yume Minamino; Kanon Nakashima; Nanami Togo	Japan
3rd place, bronze medalist(s)		Caly Chayani; Lilou Marliac; Louane Plisson	France

The women's artistic team all-around at the 2026 Summer Youth Olympics was held on 9 November 2026 at the Dakar Expo Center.

== Qualifications ==
The top eight teams in qualifications, based on combined scores of each apparatus, advanced to the final. Canada, who placed fifth in qualification, withdrew and was replaced by first reserve Czech Republic.

Rank	Team	Vault (gymnastics)	Uneven bars	Balance beam	Floor (gymnastics)	Total
1	China	25.999	27.800	27.599	25.466	106.864
2	Japan	27.300	26.666	26.466	25.932	106.364
3	Italy	26.033	25.066	25.232	25.499	101.830
4	France	26.199	26.732	22.333	26.066	101.330
6	Australia	24.699	23.632	24.466	24.332	97.129
7	Egypt	25.032	23.966	23.466	23.766	96.230
8	Romania	25.099	20.666	22.199	23.066	91.030
9	Czech Republic	23.600	22.433	21.566	22.866	90.465

== Final ==
Rank	Team	Vault (gymnastics)	Uneven bars	Balance beam	Floor (gymnastics)	Total
1st place, gold medalist(s)	China	26.033 (3)	28.366 (1)	28.366 (1)	25.033 (3)	107.798
1st place, gold medalist(s)	Chen Ziyan			14.266	12.200	107.798
1st place, gold medalist(s)	Xie Guying	13.133	14.233		12.833	107.798
1st place, gold medalist(s)	Zhong Qi	12.900	14.133	14.100		107.798
2nd place, silver medalist(s)	Japan	27.566 (1)	27.566 (2)	26.466 (2)	25.966 (1)	107.564
2nd place, silver medalist(s)	Yume Minamino	13.866	13.700	13.566	12.866	107.564
2nd place, silver medalist(s)	Kanon Nakashima		13.866	12.900		107.564
2nd place, silver medalist(s)	Nanami Togo	13.700			13.100	107.564
3rd place, bronze medalist(s)	France	26.433 (2)	27.066 (3)	25.966 (3)	25.766 (2)	105.231
3rd place, bronze medalist(s)	Caly Chayani			12.400	12.600	105.231
3rd place, bronze medalist(s)	Lilou Marliac	13.100	13.466			105.231
3rd place, bronze medalist(s)	Louane Plisson	13.333	13.600	13.566	13.166	105.231
4	Italy	25.899 (4)	25.666 (4)	24.532 (4)	24.199 (4)	100.296
4	Dalila D'Aniello	12.666	12.366			100.296
4	Sofia Frenna			11.666	11.866	100.296
4	Clarissa Rinaldi	13.233	13.300	12.866	12.333	100.296
5	Egypt	24.332 (6)	22.833 (6)	23.233 (5)	23.332 (6)	93.730
5	Tia El-Midany	12.366	10.733	12.533	12.066	93.730
5	Karma Khamis	11.966			11.266	93.730
5	Lara Soliman		12.100	10.700		93.730
6	Romania	24.766 (5)	22.333 (7)	22.566 (7)	23.832 (5)	93.497
6	Alexandra Nica	11.700	11.633	10.333	11.666	93.497
6	Aniela Tudor	13.066	10.700	12.233	12.166	93.497
7	Australia	22.566 (8)	23.599 (5)	22.232 (8)	22.866 (7)	91.263
7	Zara Andrews	10.766	11.133	10.366	11.100	91.263
7	Alice Johnson	11.800	12.466	11.866	11.766	91.263
7	Olivia Meaney					91.263
8	Czech Republic	23.366 (7)	21.533 (8)	23.132 (6)	21.832 (8)	89.863
8	Kateřina Maříková	11.833		11.766	11.266	89.863
8	Agáta Slezáková	11.533	10.533		10.566	89.863
8	Sára Sobolová		11.000	11.366		89.863
