= Gymnastics at the 2026 Asian Games – Women's artistic team all-around =

Women's team at the 2026 Asian Games
- Venue: Nippon Gaishi Hall Rainbow Hall
- Date: 22 September 2026 (qualification); 23 September 2026 (final)
- Nations: 8

Medalists
gold medal	China; Du Siyu; Ke Qinqin; Qiu Qiyuan; Zhang Qingying; Zhang Yihan
silver medal	Japan; Rina Kishi; Haruka Nakamura; Misa Nishiyama; Mana Okamura; Aiko Sugihara
bronze medal	North Korea; An Chang-ok; Han Yon-mi; Jo Kyong-byol; Kim Kyong-ryong; Pak Un-jong

The women's artistic team competition at the 2026 Asian Games was held on 23 September 2026 at the Nippon Gaishi Hall Rainbow Hall.

== Schedule ==
All times are Japan Standard Time (UTC+09:00)

Date	Time	Event
Tuesday, 22 September 2026	10:00	Qualification
Wednesday, 23 September 2026	19:00	Final

== Qualification ==
Rank	Team	Vault (gymnastics)	Uneven bars	Balance beam	Floor (gymnastics)	Total	Qual.
1	Japan (JPN)	41.999	42.132	41.766	40.466	166.363	Q
1	Misa Nishiyama	13.933	14.533	13.133	13.433	166.363	Q
1	Haruka Nakamura				13.066	166.363	Q
1	Rina Kishi	13.966	13.300	13.200	13.333	166.363	Q
1	Mana Okamura	13.100	14.066	14.300		166.363	Q
1	Aiko Sugihara	14.100	13.533	14.266	13.700	166.363	Q
2	China (CHN)	41.066	42.299	42.466	39.866	165.697	Q
2	Du Siyu	13.800	12.633			165.697	Q
2	Ke Qinqin	14.033	14.100	13.700	13.366	165.697	Q
2	Zhang Qingying	13.233	14.266	13.933	13.300	165.697	Q
2	Zhang Yihan			11.500	13.200	165.697	Q
2	Qiu Qiyuan	12.600	13.933	14.833	13.033	165.697	Q
3	North Korea (PRK)	40.099	38.965	41.332	39.199	159.595	Q
3	Kim Kyong-ryong	12.733	13.333			159.595	Q
3	Han Yon-mi			13.833	13.033	159.595	Q
3	Jo Kyong-byol	13.133	9.100	13.033	10.500	159.595	Q
3	Pak Un-jong	12.966	11.866	14.466	13.066	159.595	Q
3	An Chang-ok	14.000	13.766	12.700	13.100	159.595	Q
4	South Korea (KOR)	40.166	38.733	39.766	38.632	157.297	Q
4	Yeo Seo-jeong	14.300	12.800	12.600	13.066	157.297	Q
4	Shin Sol-yi	13.166	12.400		12.766	157.297	Q
4	Lim Su-min	12.700	11.566	13.200	12.800	157.297	Q
4	Lee Yun-seo	12.533	13.533	11.466	12.200	157.297	Q
4	Hwang Seo-hyun			13.966		157.297	Q
5	Malaysia (MAS)	37.566	37.999	36.366	35.933	147.864	Q
5	Rachel Yeoh Li Wen		14.000	12.200		147.864	Q
5	Cadence Teh Zi Qi	11.800	11.833	11.400	11.900	147.864	Q
5	Nicole Wong Ziyi	11.633		11.900		147.864	Q
5	Marissa Zaiful Azian	12.833			11.633	147.864	Q
5	Yeap Kang Xian	12.933	12.166	12.266	12.400	147.864	Q
6	Singapore (SGP)	37.366	32.832	37.199	37.299	144.696	Q
6	Amanda Yap	12.966	11.033	13.300	12.933	144.696	Q
6	Alena Tan	12.000	11.166	11.533	11.866	144.696	Q
6	Emma Goh	11.800		11.833	11.433	144.696	Q
6	Colleen Hong		10.633			144.696	Q
6	Emma Yap	12.400	10.466	12.066	12.500	144.696	Q
7	Philippines (PHI)	39.232	33.066	35.199	37.066	144.563	Q
7	Haylee Garcia	12.900	9.566	12.000	11.933	144.563	Q
7	Lauren Supnet	12.866	9.800	10.800		144.563	Q
7	Kylee Kvamme	13.466	10.100	11.866	12.233	144.563	Q
7	Chiara Andrew				11.800	144.563	Q
7	Levi Ruivivar	12.666	13.166	11.333	12.900	144.563	Q
8	Chinese Taipei (TPE)	35.766	33.466	37.566	35.500	142.298	Q
8	Ting Hua-tien		11.633	12.500		142.298	Q
8	Lai Pin-ju	11.433	10.733	13.133	12.000	142.298	Q
8	Liao Yi-chun	12.400	11.100	11.933	11.033	142.298	Q
8	Wu Yu-jhih	11.866			12.100	142.298	Q
8	Lin Yi-chen	11.500	10.600	11.633	11.400	142.298	Q
9	Kazakhstan (KAZ)	35.700	30.965	31.832	33.299	130.796	R1
9	Ameli Mukusheva	11.800	10.666	11.266	11.433	130.796	R1
9	Darya Yassinskaya	12.400		9.466	11.900	130.796	R1
9	Evelina Yezhova		10.433	11.000		130.796	R1
9	Radmilla Tarassova	11.500	9.866	9.566	9.966	130.796	R1

Results

== Final ==
Rank	Team	Vault (gymnastics)	Uneven bars	Balance beam	Floor (gymnastics)	Total
1st place, gold medalist(s)	China (CHN)	39.732 (4)	42.932 (1)	44.266 (1)	39.532 (2)	166.462
1st place, gold medalist(s)	Du Siyu	13.666	14.866			166.462
1st place, gold medalist(s)	Ke Qinqin	12.366		14.400	13.133	166.462
1st place, gold medalist(s)	Zhang Qingying		14.033	15.066	13.066	166.462
1st place, gold medalist(s)	Zhang Yihan	13.700			13.333	166.462
1st place, gold medalist(s)	Qiu Qiyuan		14.033	14.800		166.462
2nd place, silver medalist(s)	Japan (JPN)	41.632 (1)	40.233 (2)	42.032 (2)	41.465 (1)	165.362
2nd place, silver medalist(s)	Misa Nishiyama	13.733	14.500	12.933		165.362
2nd place, silver medalist(s)	Haruka Nakamura			14.233	13.633	165.362
2nd place, silver medalist(s)	Rina Kishi	13.833	12.433		13.866	165.362
2nd place, silver medalist(s)	Mana Okamura		13.300	14.866		165.362
2nd place, silver medalist(s)	Aiko Sugihara	14.066			13.966	165.362
3rd place, bronze medalist(s)	North Korea (PRK)	39.832 (3)	38.833 (3)	41.365 (3)	38.299 (4)	158.329
3rd place, bronze medalist(s)	Kim Kyong-ryong		13.600			158.329
3rd place, bronze medalist(s)	Han Yon-mi			13.266	12.933	158.329
3rd place, bronze medalist(s)	Jo Kyong-byol	13.166		13.533		158.329
3rd place, bronze medalist(s)	Pak Un-jong	12.766	12.500	14.566	12.866	158.329
3rd place, bronze medalist(s)	An Chang-ok	13.900	12.733		12.500	158.329
4	South Korea (KOR)	40.099 (2)	37.599 (5)	40.332 (4)	38.833 (3)	156.863
4	Yeo Seo-jeong	14.133	12.400	12.333	13.100	156.863
4	Shin Sol-yi	12.966	12.466		12.700	156.863
4	Lim Su-min	13.000		13.433	13.033	156.863
4	Lee Yun-seo		12.733			156.863
4	Hwang Seo-hyun			14.566		156.863
5	Malaysia (MAS)	37.899 (6)	37.799 (4)	36.999 (7)	36.366 (6)	149.063
5	Rachel Yeoh Li Wen		13.900	12.333		149.063
5	Cadence Teh Zi Qi	12.133	11.966	12.733	11.933	149.063
5	Nicole Wong Ziyi					149.063
5	Marissa Zaiful Azian	12.866			11.900	149.063
5	Yeap Kang Xian	12.900	11.933	11.933	12.533	149.063
6	Philippines (PHI)	38.900 (5)	35.232 (6)	37.499 (6)	36.132 (7)	147.763
6	Haylee Garcia		10.100			147.763
6	Lauren Supnet	12.900		11.000	11.166	147.763
6	Kylee Kvamme	13.300		13.633	11.833	147.763
6	Chiara Andrew	12.700	11.366			147.763
6	Levi Ruivivar		13.766	12.866	13.133	147.763
7	Chinese Taipei (TPE)	36.799 (8)	31.999 (8)	38.932 (5)	35.732 (8)	143.462
7	Ting Hua-tien		10.866	14.066		143.462
7	Lai Pin-ju		10.733	12.100	11.466	143.462
7	Liao Yi-chun	12.866	10.400	12.766	12.233	143.462
7	Wu Yu-jhih	12.233			12.033	143.462
7	Lin Yi-chen	11.700				143.462
8	Singapore (SGP)	37.299 (7)	32.832 (7)	36.432 (8)	36.766 (5)	143.329
8	Amanda Yap	12.900	9.633	12.666	12.633	143.329
8	Alena Tan	12.033	11.333		11.600	143.329
8	Emma Goh			11.666		143.329
8	Colleen Hong		11.866			143.329
8	Emma Yap	12.366		12.100	12.533	143.329

Results
