= Louane Plisson =

French artistic gymnast (born 2012)

- Born: 4 April 2012 (age 14)

Gymnastics career
- Discipline: Women's artistic gymnastics
- Country represented: France
Medal record
Representing France
Youth Olympic Games
Silver medal – second place	2026 Dakar	All-around
Bronze medal – third place	2026 Dakar	Team

Louane Plisson (born 4 April 2012) is a French artistic gymnast. She is the 2026 City of Jesolo Trophy junior all-around gold medalist and 2026 Summer Youth Olympics all-around silver medalist.

== Gymnastics career ==
In March 2026, Plisson competed at the 2026 City of Jesolo Trophy where she helped France win team silver. Individually she won gold in the all-around, on uneven bars and balance beam, and bronze on floor exercise.

In August 2026, she competed at the 2026 Junior European Gymnastics Championships and won silver on balance beam with a score of 13.166 points. She also won bronze in the team event.

In November 2026, she represented France at the 2026 Summer Youth Olympics. She helped France qualify in fourth place in the team competition. Individually she qualified in seventh to the all-around with 51.332 points. During the team final she helped France win bronze with a score of 105.231. During the all-around final she won silver with a score of 53.665 points.

== Competitive history ==
Competitive history of Louane Plisson at the junior level
Year	Event	Team	AA	VT	UB	BB	FX
2026	City of Jesolo Trophy	2nd place, silver medalist(s)	1st place, gold medalist(s)		1st place, gold medalist(s)	1st place, gold medalist(s)	3rd place, bronze medalist(s)
2026	European Championships	3rd place, bronze medalist(s)			4	2nd place, silver medalist(s)	
2026	Youth Olympic Games	3rd place, bronze medalist(s)	2nd place, silver medalist(s)				
