= 2026 Chinese Artistic Gymnastics Championships =

Gymnastics competition in Xiamen, China

- Location: (China) Xiamen
- Start date: May 14, 2026
- End date: May 20, 2026

The 2026 Chinese Artistic Gymnastics Championships were held from May 14–20, 2026 in Xiamen, China.

== Women's medalists ==
Event	Gold	Silver	Bronze
Team	Guangdong（广东） Hu Jiafei; Liang Yating; Ke Qinqin; Peng Zijin; Zhong Qi; He Jialin	Fujian（福建） Chu Yiming; Chen Feng; Qiu Qiyuan; Yu Linmin; Jiao Shiyan; Chen Shiqi	Zhejiang (浙江); Zhang Qingying; Zhang Xinyi; Zhao Haiyu; Chen Xinyun; Zhu Hui; Wang Jingci
Individual all-around	Ke Qinqin	Zhang Qingying	Zhang Yihan
Vault	Du Siyu	Zhang Yihan	Yu Linmin
Uneven bars	Yang Fanyuwei	Zhong Qi	Xie Guying
Balance beam	Zhang Qingying	Chen Ziyan	Ke Qinqin
Floor	Zhang Yihan	Ke Qinqin	Zhang Qingying

== Men's medalists ==
Event	Gold	Silver	Bronze
Team	Zhejiang (浙江省); Chen Xiakai; Qu Zheng; Yang Haonan; Tian Hao; Xie Chenyi; Yu Yuhao	Hunan (湖南省); Zhang Boheng; Yang Jiaxing; Liu Yang; Liao Jialei; Yang Dingkai; Yang Chengkai	Jiangsu (江苏省); Yang Yanzhi; He Xiang; Hong Yanming; Sun Wei; Tang Qi; Shi Cong
Individual all-around	Yang Haonan	Zhang Boheng	Wang Chengcheng
Floor	Su Weide	Wang Chengcheng	Chen Zhilong
Pommel horse	Hong Yanming	Lei Qingzhu Lu Chongcan	Not Awarded
Rings	Lan Xingyu	Liu Hengyu	Yang Haonan
Vault	Li Hongyan	Hu Youtian	Chen Zhilong
Parallel bars	Zhang Boheng	Yang Haonan	Sun Wei
Horizontal bar	Tian Hao	Su Weide	Liao Jialei

== Mixed Team ==
The mixed team is a new sub-event in the gymnastics event of the 2028 Summer Olympics, and it is also the first sub-event established in the national championship. The competition items are men's floor exercise, parallel bars, horizontal bar, women's uneven bars, balance beam, and floor exercise.

A total of seven teams will participate in the finals, and each team will send up to 3 male and 3 female athletes to participate in the competition. The competition is divided into three rounds. In each round, each team will compete in two events for men and women. Each team will choose the events in each round. Each athlete can only choose one event. Each event can have a maximum of 2 people on the field, and two different events must be selected. After the second round of the competition, the team ranked 1-4 in the first two rounds of points will enter the third round. In the third round, the scores of each team in the first two rounds are cleared to zero, and the final ranking is determined by the score of the third round.

Event	Gold	Silver	Bronze
Mixed Team	Zhejiang（浙江） Yang Haonan; Tian Hao; Xie Chenyi; Zhang Qingying; Zhang Xinyi; Chen Xinyun	Henan（河南） Ding Zerun; Zhang Songhonghao; Long Houcheng; Zhang Yihan; Zhang Wanning; Nie Jingyun	Anhui (安徽); Xie Guying; Shi Siqi; Cao Tianqi; Yang Lian; Rong Zihao; An Zheng
