= Zhong Qi =

Chinese gymnast

- 钟圻
- Born: 6 September 2011 (age 15) Jieyang, Guangdong, China

Gymnastics career
- Discipline: Women's artistic gymnastics
- Country represented: China
Medal record
Representing China
Youth Olympic Games
Gold medal – first place	2026 Dakar	Team
Bronze medal – third place	2026 Dakar	All-around
Junior Asian Championships
Gold medal – first place	2026 Zunyi	Team
Gold medal – first place	2026 Zunyi	All-around
Silver medal – second place	2026 Zunyi	Uneven bars
Silver medal – second place	2026 Zunyi	Balance Beam
Bronze medal – third place	2026 Zunyi	Floor Exercise

Zhong Qi (Chinese: 钟圻, born 6 September 2011) is a Chinese artistic gymnast. She is the 2026 Junior Asian all-around champion. She is also the 2025 Chinese national bronze and the 2026 silver medalist on uneven bars.

== 2025 ==
At the 2025 Chinese Artistic Gymnastics Championships, Zhong won silver with the (senior) Guangdong Province team and bronze on uneven bars.

In September at the 2025 Junior National Games, she won the team gold medal with the Guangdong Province team that also included Huang Ziyi, Ke Qinqin, He Xinyu, Zhong Jiatong, and Liang Yating. The gold medal became the first for Guangdong at that year's games. Individually, she won the all-around bronze medal.

In November at the 2025 (Adult) National Games, she was part of the (senior) Guangdong Province team that also included Ou Yushan, Hu Jiafei, Ke Qinqin, Peng Zijin, and Huang Ziyi and won the team silver medal.

== 2026 ==
At the 2026 Chinese Artistic Gymnastics Championships, Zhong won silver on uneven bars. In November 2026, she represented China at the 2026 Summer Youth Olympics. She helped China qualify in first place in the team competition. During the inaugural team final she helped China win gold with a score of 107.798.

== Competitive history ==
Competitive history of Zhong Qi
Year	Event	Team	AA	VT	UB	BB	FX
2025	Chinese Championships	2nd place, silver medalist(s)			3rd place, bronze medalist(s)		
2025	Chinese Junior National Games	1st place, gold medalist(s)					
2025	Chinese National Games	2nd place, silver medalist(s)			2nd place, silver medalist(s)		
2026
2026	Asian Junior Championships	1st place, gold medalist(s)	1st place, gold medalist(s)		2nd place, silver medalist(s)	2nd place, silver medalist(s)	3rd place, bronze medalist(s)
2026	Youth Olympic Games	1st place, gold medalist(s)	3rd place, bronze medalist(s)				
