= Aiko Sugihara =

Japanese artistic gymnast (born 1999)

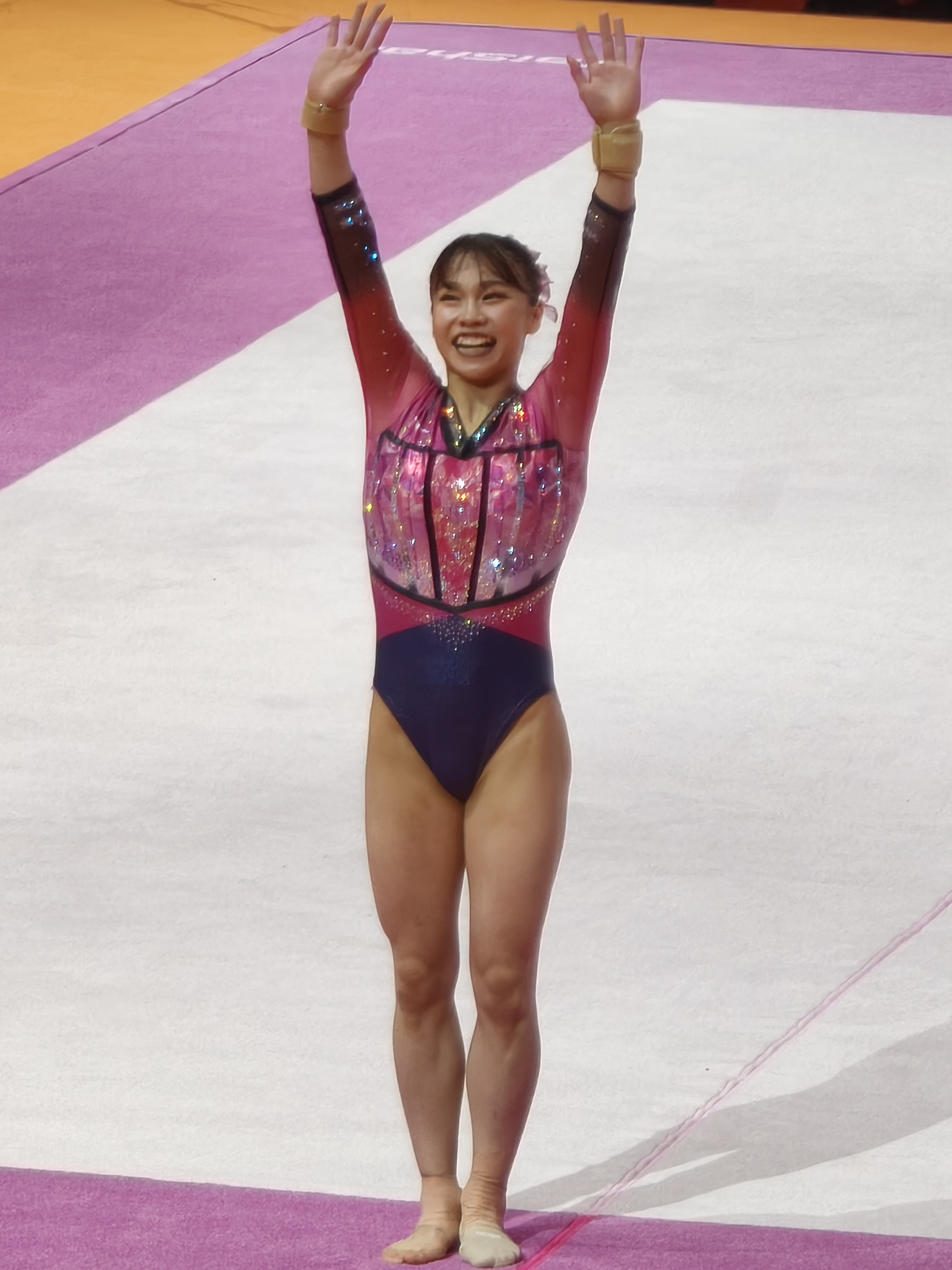
- Sugihara at the 2025 World Championships

Personal information
- Nickname: Twist Princess
- Born: 19 September 1999 (age 27) Higashiōsaka, Osaka, Japan
- Height: 146 cm (4 ft 9 in)

Gymnastics career
- Discipline: Women's artistic gymnastics
- Country represented: Japan; (2015–present)
- Club: Mukogawa Women's University
- Head coach: Kazukuni Ono
- Eponymous skills: Sugihara (E) (balance beam): a double turn with free leg held at 180 degree split
Medal record
Representing Japan
World Championships
Gold medal – first place	2025 Jakarta	Floor exercise
Bronze medal – third place	2025 Jakarta	Balance beam
Bronze medal – third place	2026 Rotterdam	Team
Asian Games
Gold medal – first place	2026 Aichi-Nagoya	All-around
Gold medal – first place	2026 Aichi-Nagoya	Floor exercise
Silver medal – second place	2026 Aichi-Nagoya	Team
Asian Championships
Gold medal – first place	2015 Hiroshima	Team
Gold medal – first place	2015 Hiroshima	All-around
Gold medal – first place	2025 Jecheon	All-around
Silver medal – second place	2015 Hiroshima	Uneven bars
Silver medal – second place	2015 Hiroshima	Floor exercise
Silver medal – second place	2025 Jecheon	Team
Silver medal – second place	2025 Jecheon	Balance beam
Silver medal – second place	2025 Jecheon	Floor exercise
Silver medal – second place	2026 Zunyi	Team
Silver medal – second place	2026 Zunyi	Floor exercise
Summer Universiade
Gold medal – first place	2019 Napoli	Team
Silver medal – second place	2019 Napoli	Floor exercise
FIG World Cup
Event / 1st / 2nd / 3rd; Apparatus World Cup / 2 / 1 / 0

Aiko Sugihara (杉原 愛子, Sugihara Aiko; born 19 September 1999) is a Japanese female artistic gymnast. She is the 2025 world champion on floor exercise and bronze medalist on balance beam. She was also part of the bronze medal-winning team at the 2026 World Championships. Sugihara is the 2015 and 2025 Asian all-around champion, also winning team gold in 2015, and a 2019 Summer Universiade team gold medalist. She represented Japan at the 2016 and 2020 Olympic Games.

== Junior career ==
Sugihara made her international debut at the 2013 City of Jesolo Trophy and placed thirteenth in the all-around. At the 2013 All-Japan Championships, she finished eighth in the all-around. She then finished eleventh in the all-around at the 2013 NHK Trophy. At the 2013 All-Japan Event Championships, she finished fourth on the vault and eighth on the floor exercise. In September, she competed at the 2013 Junior Japan International, where she placed eighth on the vault and sixth on the floor exercise. At the 2014 All-Japan Championships, she finished sixteenth in the all-around. Then at the 2014 NHK Cup, she finished twelfth in the all-around.

== Senior career ==
=== 2015 ===
Sugihara won the bronze medal in the all-around at the All-Japan Championships behind Asuka Teramoto and Yuki Uchiyama. She then won the all-around at the NHK Cup and was named to compete at the World Championships. At the All-Japan Event Championships, she finished eighth on the uneven bars and won the bronze medal on the balance beam and the silver medal on the floor exercise.

She was selected to compete at the Asian Championships in Hiroshima alongside Natsumi Sasada, Asuka Teramoto, Sakura Yumoto, Yuki Uchiyama, and Sae Miyakawa, and they won the team gold medal. Individually, Sugihara won the gold medal in the all-around with a total score of 58.050. In the event finals, she won the silver medal on the uneven bars behind Zhu Xiaofang and on the floor exercise behind Wang Yan. She then competed at the World Championships alongside Asuka Teramoto, Mai Murakami, Sae Miyakawa, Sakura Yumoto, and Natsumi Sasada, and they finished fifth in the team final.

=== 2016 ===
Sugihara won the bronze medal in the all-around at the All-Japan Championships. She also won the bronze medal in the all-around at the NHK Cup behind Asuka Teramoto and Mai Murakami, and she was named to the seven-person Olympic training squad from whom the final team of five would be selected. At the All-Japan Event Championships, she won the silver medals on the uneven bars and the balance beam.

She was selected to represent Japan at the 2016 Summer Olympics alongside Sae Miyakawa, Mai Murakami, Asuka Teramoto, and Yuki Uchiyama, and they finished fourth in the team final. After the Olympics, she competed at the Toyota International and won the silver medals on the uneven bars and on the floor exercise, and she finished fourth on the balance beam.

=== 2017 ===
At the All-Japan Championships, Sugihara won the silver medal in the all-around behind Mai Murakami. She then won another all-around silver medal at the NHK Trophy. At the All-Japan Event Championships, she finished fourth on the uneven bars and fifth on the floor exercise.

Sugihara competed at the World Championships in Montreal, where she finished sixth in the all-around final. In December, at the Toyota International, she finished ninth on the balance beam and won the silver medal on the floor exercise behind Mai Murakami.

=== 2018 ===
Sugihara finished sixth in the all-around at the Tokyo World Cup. She then finished fourth in the all-around at the All-Japan Championships and at the NHK Cup. She withdrew from the World Championships due to a back injury. She returned to competition at the Toyota International and won the silver medal on the floor exercise behind Asuka Teramoto.

=== 2019 ===
Sugihara finished fourth in the all-around at the Tokyo World Cup. She then competed at the All-Japan Championships and finished fifth in the all-around. At the NHK Cup, she finished fourth and was selected to compete at the World Championships. At the All-Japan Event Championships, she placed sixth on the balance beam and won the silver medal on the floor exercise behind Asuka Teramoto.

At the Summer Universiade, she won the team gold medal alongside Teramoto and Hitomi Hatakeda. She finished fourth in the all-around final with a total score of 52.450, and she also finished fourth in the balance beam final. In the floor exercise final, she scored 13.000 and won the silver medal behind Italian gymnast Carlotta Ferlito. She then competed at the World Championships alongside Hitomi Hatakeda, Nagi Kajita, Akari Matsumura, and Asuka Teramoto, and they finished eleventh in the qualification round, which earned Japan a team spot for the 2020 Olympic Games. After the World Championships, she competed at the Toyota International, where she finished sixth on the balance beam.

=== 2020-2021 ===
The 2020 All-Japan Championships were postponed until December due to the COVID-19 pandemic in Japan, and Sugihara finished eighth in the all-around. Then at the 2021 All-Japan Championships, she finished fourth in the all-around. At the 2021 NHK Trophy, she once again finished fourth in the all-around and was named to Japan's 2020 Olympic team alongside Hitomi Hatakeda, Mai Murakami, and Yuna Hiraiwa. Then at the All-Japan Event Championships, she won the silver medal on the balance beam behind Murakami, and she won the gold medal on the floor exercise.

At the postponed 2020 Olympic Games, she helped Japan finish fifth in the team final, contributing scores on vault, uneven bars, and floor exercise.

=== 2022 ===
Sugihara took a year off from competition due to burnout.

=== 2023 ===
In June, Sugihara founded her own company, TRyAS, to popularize artistic gymnastics and support gymnasts. That month, she also returned to competing at the All-Japan Event Championships, where she competed on floor. She scored 13.400 and won that event.

=== 2024 ===
Sugihara worked with a leotard manufacturer to design a new leotard, which she dubbed the "Aitard" after herself and debuted in competition. The leotard has a lower cut, with fabric extending to the top of the legs, and is based on the attire worn by men's aerobic gymnasts. Sugihara said that while she had not minded wearing high-cut leotards when she was younger, as she grew older, she began to have concerns about wearing them, and photographs of her in leotards had received sexual comments online. She was inspired to create a new leotard design after the German women's gymnastics team competed in unitards at the 2020 Summer Olympics and after a male employee of hers suggested creating a new gymnastics outfit for parents who did not want their children wearing revealing leotards. The new leotards conform to International Gymnastics Federation rules.

She finished fifth in the all-around at the All-Japan Artistic Gymnastics Championships in April, then competed at the NHK Trophy in May and again finished in 5th place. Due to her results, she was named an alternate for the Japanese team for the 2024 Summer Olympics. Although one of the team's gymnasts, Shoko Miyata, was withdrawn from competing, Sugihara did not compete in her stead because the withdrawal was not for medical reasons.

In September, Sugihara competed in the National Sports Festival, representing her home prefecture of Osaka, where she won a team gold medal. One week later, she competed at the All-Japan Senior Championships, which she won for the third time, seven years after her prior victory there.

=== 2025 ===
In March, Sugihara competed at the World Cup in Antalya, where she won the gold medal in floor exercise. In April, she was second at the individual All-Japan Gymnastics Championships.

Ahead of the NHK Trophy in May, she said that she was trying to focus on herself and enjoy the competition rather than thinking of qualifying to the 2025 World Championships team, as she felt she had not performed as well as she wanted to at the previous year's NHK Trophy due to focusing on making the Olympic team. Ten years after her first NHK Trophy victory, she won the all-around for a second time, just .033 points ahead of Rina Kishi. The result gave her a place on the World Championships team.

At the 2025 World Championships in Jakarta, Indonesia, Sugihara qualified for the all-around, balance beam, and floor exercise finals. During the qualification round, she earned an all-around total of 54.099, putting her in second place. However, a fall during the all-around final dropped her into seventh place. In the balance beam final, Sugihara won the bronze medal behind Zhang Qingying of China and Kaylia Nemour of Algeria. Later that same day, she earned a gold medal in the floor exercise final, her first-ever World Championship title.

=== 2026 ===
Sugihara began the 2026 season at the Cottbus World Cup, where she won the gold medal on balance beam and the silver medal on floor. In April, she competed at the All-Japan Championships, winning the national title on floor exercise. She achieved similar results at the NHK Trophy the following month, winning gold on floor as well as bronze on beam and in the all-around. Based on these results, she was named to the Japanese teams for the 2026 Asian Games and the 2026 World Championships, alongside Rina Kishi, Haruka Nakamura, Misa Nishiyama, and Mana Okamura.

In June, Sugihara won the silver medal with the Japanese team at the Asian Championships. She won a second silver medal on floor exercise behind Zhang Yihan of China.

While at the Asian Games, Sugihara became the first Japanese woman, as well as the first woman from outside China, to win all-around gold. She won gold in the floor final, and she contributed to Japan's silver-medal finish as a team.

In October, she competed at the 2026 World Artistic Gymnastics Championships, and won a bronze medal in the team event. This was the first medal for Japan's women's team at the Artistic Gymnastics World Championships since 1966.

== Eponymous skill ==
Sugihara has one eponymous skill listed in the Code of Points.

Apparatus	Name	Description	Difficulty (Note: Valid for the 2025–2028 Code of Points)	Added to the Code of Points
Balance beam	Sugihara	2/1 (720°) turn with free leg held upward in 180° split position throughout the turn	E (0.5)	2017 World Championships

== Competitive history ==
Competitive history of Aiko Sugihara
Year	Event	Team	AA	VT	UB	BB	FX
2013	City of Jesolo Trophy		13				
2013	All-Japan Championships		8				
2013	NHK Trophy		11				
2013	All-Japan Event Championships			4			8
2013	Junior Japan International			8		6	
2014	All-Japan Championships		16				
2014	NHK Cup		12				
2015	All-Japan Championships		3rd place, bronze medalist(s)				
2015	NHK Cup		1st place, gold medalist(s)				
2015	All-Japan Event Championships				8	3rd place, bronze medalist(s)	2nd place, silver medalist(s)
2015	Asian Championships	1st place, gold medalist(s)	1st place, gold medalist(s)		2nd place, silver medalist(s)		2nd place, silver medalist(s)
2015	World Championships	5					
2016	All-Japan Championships		3rd place, bronze medalist(s)				
2016	NHK Cup		3rd place, bronze medalist(s)				
2016	All-Japan Event Championships				2nd place, silver medalist(s)	2nd place, silver medalist(s)	
2016	Olympic Games	4					
2016	Toyota International				2nd place, silver medalist(s)	4	2nd place, silver medalist(s)
2017	All-Japan Championships		2nd place, silver medalist(s)				
2017	NHK Cup		2nd place, silver medalist(s)				
2017	All-Japan Event Championships				4	5	
2017	World Championships	—N/a	6				
2017	Toyota International					9	2nd place, silver medalist(s)
2018	Tokyo World Cup		6				
2018	All-Japan Championships		4				
2018	NHK Cup		4				
2018	Toyota International						2nd place, silver medalist(s)
2019	Tokyo World Cup		4				
2019	All-Japan Championships		5				
2019	NHK Cup		4				
2019	All-Japan Event Championships					6	2nd place, silver medalist(s)
2019	Summer Universiade	1st place, gold medalist(s)	4			4	1st place, gold medalist(s)
2019	World Championships	11					
2019	Toyota International					6	
2020	All-Japan Championships		8				
2021	All-Japan Championships		4				
2021	NHK Cup		4				
2021	All-Japan Event Championships					2nd place, silver medalist(s)	1st place, gold medalist(s)
2021	Olympic Games	5					
2025	Antalya World Cup					5	1st place, gold medalist(s)
2025	NHK Trophy		1st place, gold medalist(s)	3rd place, bronze medalist(s)		3rd place, bronze medalist(s)	1st place, gold medalist(s)
2025	Asian Championships	2nd place, silver medalist(s)	1st place, gold medalist(s)			2nd place, silver medalist(s)	2nd place, silver medalist(s)
2025	World Championships	—N/a	7			3rd place, bronze medalist(s)	1st place, gold medalist(s)
2026	Cottbus World Cup				8	1st place, gold medalist(s)	2nd place, silver medalist(s)
2026	NHK Trophy		3rd place, bronze medalist(s)				
2026	Asian Championships	2nd place, silver medalist(s)				5	2nd place, silver medalist(s)
2026	Asian Games	2nd place, silver medalist(s)	1st place, gold medalist(s)			4	1st place, gold medalist(s)
2026	World Championships	3rd place, bronze medalist(s)	5				
