= Nanami Togo =

Japanese artistic gymnast (born 2011)

- 藤後 七海
- Born: 11 November 2011 (age 15)

Gymnastics career
- Discipline: Women's artistic gymnastics
- Country represented: Japan
- Club: Namba Gymnastics
Medal record
Representing Japan
Youth Olympic Games
Silver medal – second place	2026 Dakar	Team

Nanami Togo (Japanese: 藤後 七海; born 11 November 2011) is a Japanese artistic gymnast. She is the 2025 and 2026 Junior Asian Championships floor exercise champion. She represented Japan at the 2026 Summer Youth Olympics and won a silver medal in the team event.

== Gymnastics career ==
Togo finished 20th in the all-around at the 2024 All-Japan Junior Championships. She also placed 20th in the all-around at the 2025 All-Japan Championships, and she placed 22nd at the NHK Trophy. She made her international debut at the 2025 Junior Asian Championships, where Japan won the team title. She placed third in the all-around but did not receive the bronze medal due to the two-per-country rule. She then won the gold medal in both the balance beam and floor exercise finals. At the 2025 All-Japan Junior Championships, she finished 13th in the all-around.

At the 2026 All-Japan Championships, Togo won the bronze medal on the floor exercise and placed 13th in the all-around. She also finished 13th in the all-around at the NHK Trophy. She then competed at the 2026 Junior Asian Gymnastics Championships and won gold on floor exercise with a score of 13.466 points. She also won silver in the team competition. At the All-Japan Junior Championships, she finished seventh in the all-around and won a silver medal on the vault. In November 2026, she represented Japan at the 2026 Summer Youth Olympics. She helped Japan qualify in second place in the team competition. Individually she qualified in fifth to the all-around with 52.399 points. During the team final she helped Japan win silver with a score of 107.564, only 0.234 points behind China. She then placed sixth in the all-around final with a total score of 52.532.

== Competitive history ==
Competitive history of Nanami Togo
Year	Event	Team	AA	VT	UB	BB	FX
2026	All-Japan Junior Championships		20				
2025	All-Japan Championships		20				
2025	NHK Trophy		22				
2025	Asian Championships	1st place, gold medalist(s)				1st place, gold medalist(s)	1st place, gold medalist(s)
2025	All-Japan Junior Championships		13				
2026	All-Japan Championships		13				3rd place, bronze medalist(s)
2026	NHK Trophy		13				
2026	Asian Championships	2nd place, silver medalist(s)					1st place, gold medalist(s)
2026	All-Japan Junior Championships		7	2nd place, silver medalist(s)			
2026	Youth Olympic Games	2nd place, silver medalist(s)	6				
