= Chen Ziyan =

Chinese gymnast (born 2011)

Gymnastics career
- Discipline: Women's artistic gymnastics
- Country represented: China
Medal record
Representing China
Youth Olympic Games
Gold medal – first place	2026 Dakar	Team
Gold medal – first place	2026 Dakar	Mixed team

Chen Ziyan (Chinese: 陈紫嫣) is a Chinese artistic gymnast and a member of China women's national artistic gymnastics team.

== Gymnastics career ==
In May 2026, Chen competed at the 2026 Chinese Artistic Gymnastics Championships and won silver on balance beam. The next month she competed at the 2026 Junior Asian Gymnastics Championships and won gold in the team event. Individually she won gold on balance beam with a score of 14.600. She also won silver in the individual all-around with a score of 53.965.

In November 2026, she represented China at the 2026 Summer Youth Olympics. She helped China qualify in first place in the team competition. During the inaugural team final she helped China win gold with a score of 107.798. She also won a gold medal in the inaugural mixed team event, along with Yang Lanbin.

== Competitive history ==
Competitive history of Chen Ziyan
Year	Event	Team	AA	VT	UB	BB	FX
2026
2026	Chinese Championships					2nd place, silver medalist(s)	
2026	Asian Championships	1st place, gold medalist(s)	2nd place, silver medalist(s)			1st place, gold medalist(s)	
2026	Youth Olympic Games	1st place, gold medalist(s)					
