= Qiu Qiyuan =

Chinese gymnast (born 2007)

- 邱祺缘
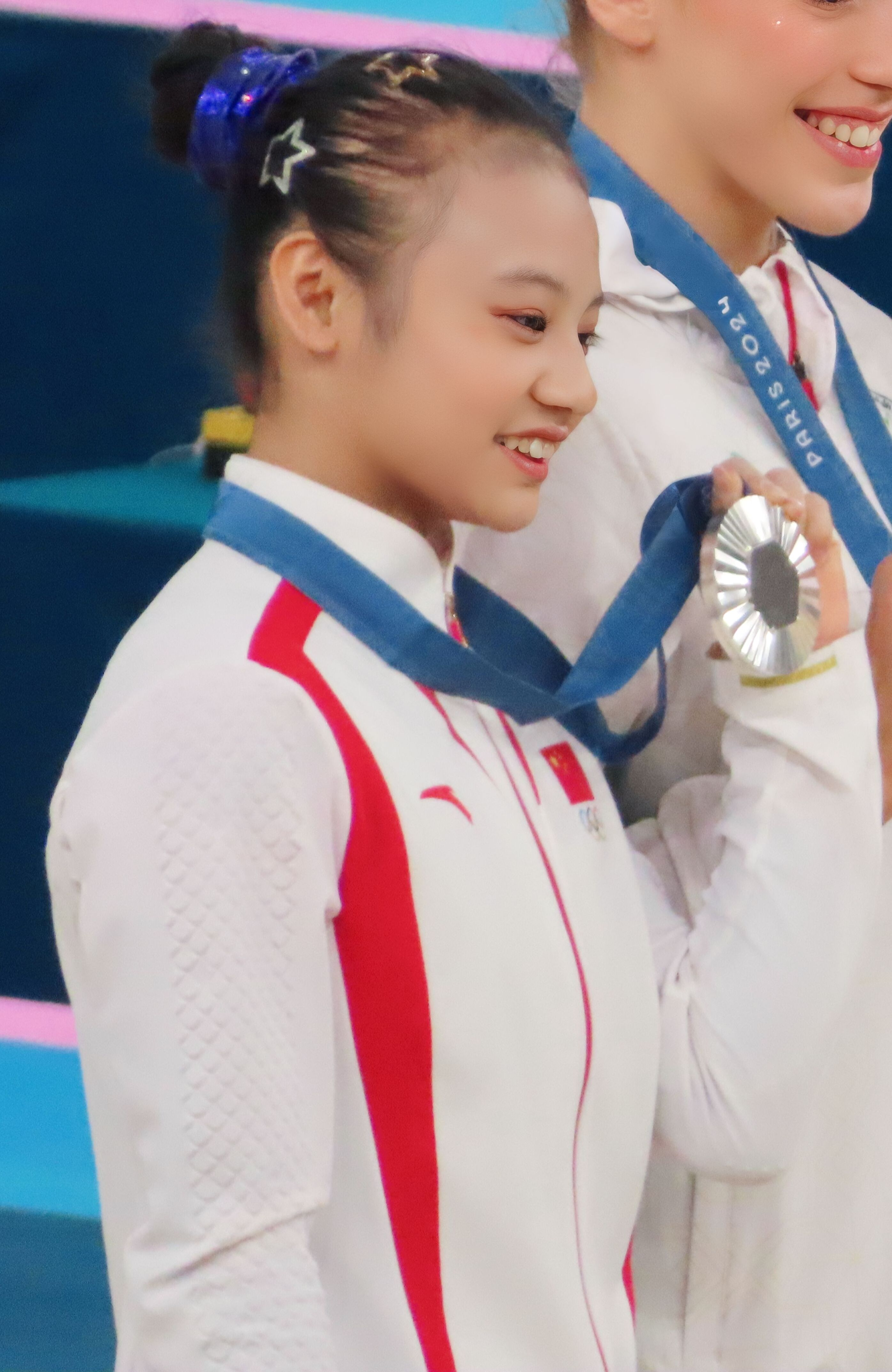
- Qiu at the 2024 Summer Olympics

Personal information
- Full name: Qiu Qiyuan
- Born: 24 May 2007 (age 19) Fujian, China

Gymnastics career
- Discipline: Women's artistic gymnastics
- Country represented: China; (2019–present)
- Head coaches: Sun Ping, Liu Tao
Medal record
Representing China
Olympic Games
Silver medal – second place	2024 Paris	Uneven bars
World Championships
Gold medal – first place	2023 Antwerp	Uneven bars
Gold medal – first place	2026 Rotterdam	Team
Asian Games
Gold medal – first place	2026 Aichi-Nagoya	Team
Gold medal – first place	2026 Aichi-Nagoya	Uneven bars
Silver medal – second place	2026 Aichi-Nagoya	Balance beam
Asian Championships
Gold medal – first place	2023 Singapore	Team
Gold medal – first place	2023 Singapore	All-around
Gold medal – first place	2023 Singapore	Uneven bars
Gold medal – first place	2026 Zunyi	Team
Gold medal – first place	2026 Zunyi	Uneven bars

Qiu Qiyuan (born 24 May 2007) is a Chinese artistic gymnast. On the uneven bars she is the 2023 World, 2026 Asian Games, and a two-time Asian (2023, 2026) champion as well as the 2024 Olympic silver medalist. Additionally, she is the 2023 Asian all-around champion, 2026 Asian Games balance beam silver medalist, and is a two-time Chinese all-around champion.

== Junior gymnastics career ==
Qiu began gymnastics when she was four years old.

=== Espoir ===
At the 2019 Chinese Junior Championships, Qiu won the all-around bronze medal in the U-13 category. In the event finals, she won silver in the balance beam and floor exercise. Then at the 2019 National Youth Games, she won the silver medal in the all-around in the espoir division. Then in the event finals, she won gold in the balance beam and floor exercise and silver in the uneven bars behind Huang Zhuofan. At the 2020 Chinese Junior Individual Championships, she finished fifth in the all-around and won bronze in the uneven bars in the U-14 category.

=== Junior ===
Qiu competed at the senior level Chinese Championships in 2021 and finished tenth in the all-around and seventh in the balance beam. Then at the National Games, she won the bronze medal in the balance beam behind Zhou Yaqin and Ou Yushan. She also finished fifth in the all-around and sixth with the Fujian provincial team. At the 2022 Chinese Championships, she won the gold medal in the balance beam. She finished seventh in the all-around and fourth in the uneven bars.

== Senior gymnastics career ==
=== 2023 ===
Qiu became age-eligible for senior international competition in 2023. She made her senior international debut at the Doha World Cup. She finished sixth in the uneven bars and seventh in the balance beam. Then at the Baku World Cup, she won the gold medal in the uneven bars. She won the Chinese national titles in the all-around, uneven bars, and balance beam. In June, she was chosen for China's Asian Championships team along with Zhang Qingying, Zhang Xinyi, Zuo Tong, and Jia Ruoyi. The team won China's fourth-straight Asian Championships team title. Individually, Qiu won the all-around gold medal with a score of 54.932.

Qiu was selected to compete in Antwerp for the 2023 World Championships. The Chinese team consisted of Ou Yushan, Zhang Qingying, Zhou Yaqin, and Huang Zhuofan, with Wu Ran as the alternate. Qiu qualified for the individual all-around and uneven bar finals. Team China finished fourth in the team final behind the United States, Brazil, and France. Qiu also finished fourth in the individual all-around final behind Simone Biles, Rebeca Andrade, and Shilese Jones. In the uneven bars final, she became World champion with a score of 15.100, slightly edging out Kaylia Nemour of Algeria.

=== 2024 ===
In March Qiu competed at the DTB Pokal Team Challenge where she helped China win as a team. Individually she placed first in the uneven bars and balance beam. The following month she competed at the Chinese National Championships where she won her second all-around national title. She was selected to represent China at the 2024 Summer Olympics alongside Luo Huan, Ou Yushan, Zhang Yihan, Zhou Yaqin.

At the Olympic Games Qiu helped China qualify for the team final in third place. Individually she had qualified to the all-around and uneven bars finals. During the team final she contributed scores in vault, uneven bars, and balance beam towards China's sixth place finish. During the all-around final Qiu placed seventh. For the uneven bars final Qiu performed an exceptional routine, earning a 15.500, her highest score of the whole competition. She won the silver medal behind Kaylia Nemour, who posted a score of 15.700.

=== 2026 ===
At the 2026 Asian Championships, Qiu helped China win gold as a team. She initially did not qualify to the uneven bars final due to two teammates qualifying above her; however teammate Ke Qinqin withdrew so Qiu could compete; she went on to win gold. She next competed at the 2026 Asian Games. During the team final, she helped China win their fourteenth consecutive Asian Games team title. For the second time this year Qiu did not qualify to the uneven bars final due to two teammates qualifying above her, and once again Ke withdrew so Qiu could compete; she did go on to win gold. On the final day of the competition, she won silver on balance beam behind Hwang Seo-hyun.

At the 2026 World Championships, Qiu helped China qualify to the team final in first place and individually she qualified to the balance beam final. During the team final, she competed on the uneven bars, balance beam, and floor exercise, helping China win their first World team gold in twenty years and ending the United States's gold medal winning streak they've had since 2011.

== Competitive history ==
Competitive history of Qiu Qiyuan
Year	Event	Team	AA	VT	UB	BB	FX
2019	Chinese Junior Championships		3rd place, bronze medalist(s)		7	2nd place, silver medalist(s)	2nd place, silver medalist(s)
2019	National Youth Games		2nd place, silver medalist(s)		2nd place, silver medalist(s)	1st place, gold medalist(s)	1st place, gold medalist(s)
2020	Chinese Junior Championships		5		3rd place, bronze medalist(s)		
2021	Chinese Junior Championships		10			7	
2021	National Games	5	6			3rd place, bronze medalist(s)	
2022	Chinese Junior Championships	6	7		4	1st place, gold medalist(s)	
2023	Doha World Cup				6	7	
2023	Baku World Cup				1st place, gold medalist(s)		
2023	Chinese Championships		1st place, gold medalist(s)		1st place, gold medalist(s)	1st place, gold medalist(s)	
2023	Asian Championships	1st place, gold medalist(s)	1st place, gold medalist(s)		1st place, gold medalist(s)		7
2023	World Championships	4	4		1st place, gold medalist(s)		
2024	DTB Pokal Team Challenge	1st place, gold medalist(s)			1st place, gold medalist(s)	1st place, gold medalist(s)	
2024	Chinese Championships	3rd place, bronze medalist(s)	1st place, gold medalist(s)		1st place, gold medalist(s)	3rd place, bronze medalist(s)	3rd place, bronze medalist(s)
2024	Olympic Games	6	7		2nd place, silver medalist(s)		
2025	Chinese Championships	4					
2025	National Games	5	2nd place, silver medalist(s)		1st place, gold medalist(s)	6	
2026	Cairo World Cup				7	3rd place, bronze medalist(s)	
2026	Chinese Championships	2nd place, silver medalist(s)			6		
2026	Asian Championships	1st place, gold medalist(s)			1st place, gold medalist(s)		
2026	Asian Games	1st place, gold medalist(s)			1st place, gold medalist(s)	2nd place, silver medalist(s)	
2026	World Championships	1st place, gold medalist(s)				7	
