= Zhang Yihan =

Chinese artistic gymnast (born 2008)

Zhang Yihan 张怡涵
- Born: 24 January 2008 (age 18) Henan, China

Gymnastics career
- Discipline: Women's artistic gymnastics
- Country represented: China; (2024–present)
- Eponymous skills: Uneven Bars: Clear hip circle on high bar with counter-stretched reverse hecht in layout position over high bar to hang
Medal record
Representing China
World Championships
Gold medal – first place	2026 Rotterdam	Team
Asian Games
Gold medal – first place	2026 Aichi-Nagoya	Team
Bronze medal – third place	2026 Aichi-Nagoya	Floor exercise
Asian Championships
Gold medal – first place	2025 Jecheon	Team
Gold medal – first place	2025 Jecheon	Vault
Gold medal – first place	2026 Zunyi	Team
Gold medal – first place	2026 Zunyi	Floor exercise
Bronze medal – third place	2025 Jecheon	Uneven bars

Zhang Yihan (Chinese: 张怡涵, romanized: Zhāng Yíhán; born 24 January 2008) is a Chinese artistic gymnast. She was part of the gold medal-winning team at the 2026 World Championships. Zhang represented China at the 2024 Summer Olympics and placed eighth in the uneven bars final.

== Junior gymnastics career ==
=== 2021-2022 ===
Zhang competed at the 2021 Chinese Youth Games and finished eighth with the Henan provincial team. Then at the 2022 Chinese Youth Championships, she won the silver medal in the all-around in the U14 age group. In the event finals, she won gold on uneven bars, silver on vault, and bronze on floor exercise.

=== 2023 ===
At the 2023 Chinese Championships, Zhang placed eighth in the uneven bars final. She then competed at the 2023 Kazan Friendly where the Chinese team lost to Russia. Individually, Zhang won the bronze medal in the all-around despite placing fourth, due to the two-per-country rule. In the event finals, she won silver medals on both vault and uneven bars.

== Senior gymnastics career ==
=== 2024 ===
Zhang became age-eligible for senior competitions in 2024. She made her senior debut at the 2024 Cottbus World Cup. She finished fourth on the uneven bars, only 0.100 away from the bronze medalist Maellyse Brassart. She was selected to compete for China at the 2024 Summer Olympics alongside Luo Huan, Ou Yushan, Qiu Qiyuan and Zhou Yaqin, following her performance at the 2024 Chinese Championships. She finished eight in the uneven bars final.

=== 2025 ===
Zhang began the season at the 2025 Cottbus World Cup, where she won gold in the floor exercise final. At that same competition, she introduced a new release element on the uneven bars, the Zhang. She competed in the Chinese Championships, where she won bronze in the team and all around, as well as becoming the national champion on floor. At the Asian Championships in June, Zhang contributed to the Chinese team's gold medal finish. She also won the gold medal in the vault final and the bronze on uneven bars.

=== 2026 ===
At the 2026 World Championships, Zhang helped China qualify to the team final in first place. During the team final, she won gold with the team, earning China win their first World team gold in twenty years and ending the United States's gold medal winning streak they've had since 2011.

== Eponymous skill ==
Apparatus	Name	Description	Difficulty (Note: Valid for the 2025–2028 Code of Points)	Added to the Code of Points
Uneven bars	Zhang	Clear hip circle on high bar with counter-stretched reverse hecht in layout position over high bar to hang	G (0.7)	2025 Cottbus World Cup

== Competitive history ==
Competitive history of Zhang Yihan at the junior level
Year	Event	Team	AA	VT	UB	BB	FX
2021	Chinese Youth Games	8					
2022	Chinese Youth Championships		2nd place, silver medalist(s)	2nd place, silver medalist(s)	1st place, gold medalist(s)		3rd place, bronze medalist(s)
2023	Chinese Championships				8		
2023	Kazan Friendly	2nd place, silver medalist(s)	3rd place, bronze medalist(s)	2nd place, silver medalist(s)	2nd place, silver medalist(s)		

Competitive history of Zhang Yihan at the senior level
Year	Event	Team	AA	VT	UB	BB	FX
2024	Cottbus World Cup				4		
2024	Chinese Championships			2nd place, silver medalist(s)			
2024	Olympic Games	6			8		R1
2025	Cottbus World Cup						1st place, gold medalist(s)
2025	Chinese Championships	3rd place, bronze medalist(s)	3rd place, bronze medalist(s)				1st place, gold medalist(s)
2025	Asian Championships	1st place, gold medalist(s)		1st place, gold medalist(s)	3rd place, bronze medalist(s)		
2025	Chinese National Games	6	5	4			
2026	Chinese Championships		3rd place, bronze medalist(s)	2nd place, silver medalist(s)			1st place, gold medalist(s)
2026	Asian Championships	1st place, gold medalist(s)					1st place, gold medalist(s)
2026	Asian Games	1st place, gold medalist(s)					3rd place, bronze medalist(s)
2026	World Championships	1st place, gold medalist(s)					
