= Zhang Qingying =

Chinese gymnast

- 张清颖
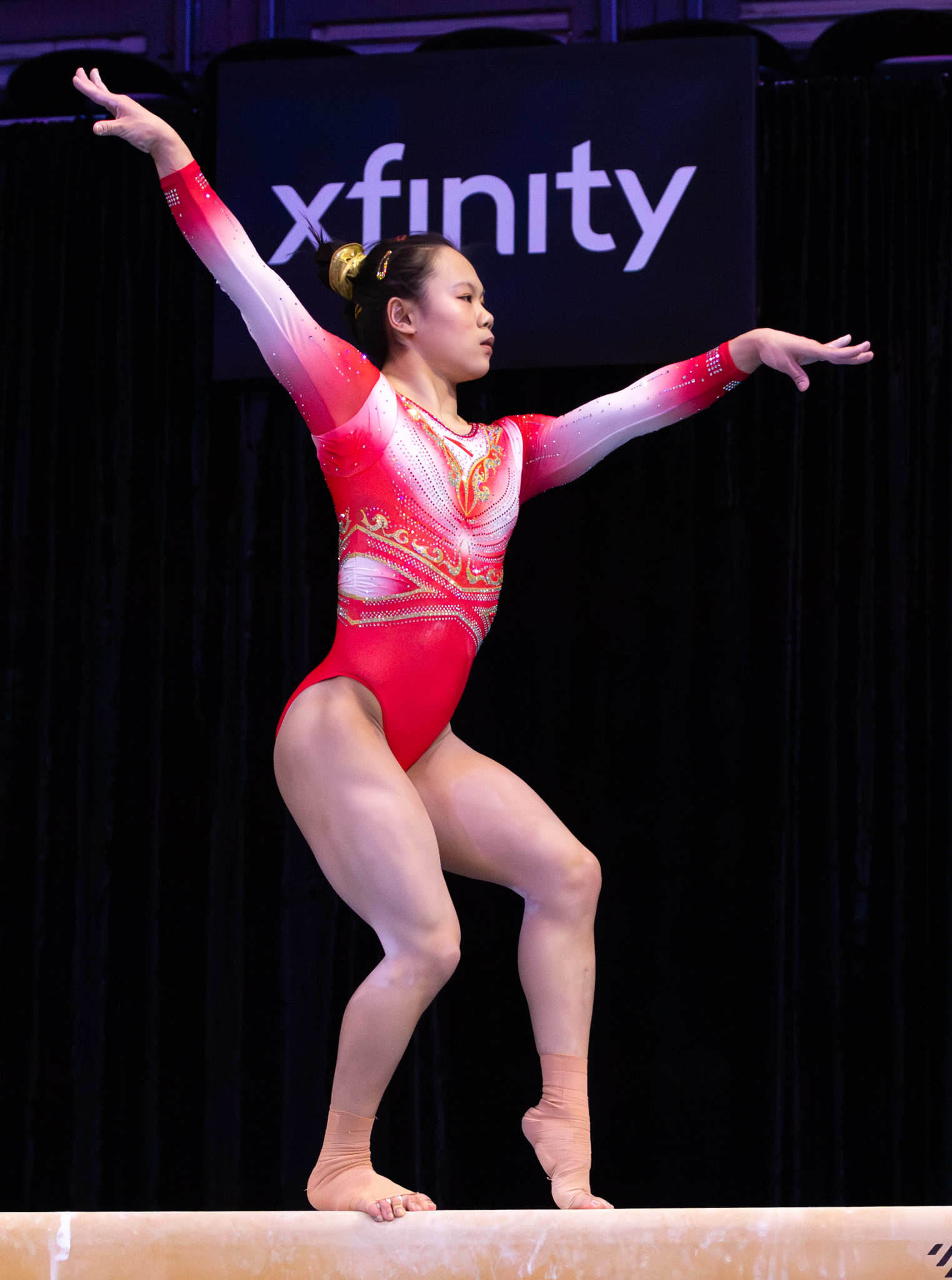
- Zhang Qingying at the 2026 American Cup

Personal information
- Born: 21 May 2007 (age 19) Jiajiang, Taizhou, Zhejiang, China

Gymnastics career
- Discipline: Women's artistic gymnastics
- Country represented: China; (2019–present)
Medal record
Representing China
World Championships
Gold medal – first place	2025 Jakarta	Balance beam
Gold medal – first place	2026 Rotterdam	Team
Silver medal – second place	2026 Rotterdam	Balance beam
Bronze medal – third place	2025 Jakarta	All-around
Asian Games
Gold medal – first place	2026 Aichi-Nagoya	Team
Bronze medal – third place	2026 Aichi-Nagoya	Uneven bars
Asian Championships
Gold medal – first place	2023 Singapore	Team
Gold medal – first place	2023 Singapore	Balance beam
Gold medal – first place	2023 Singapore	Floor exercise
Gold medal – first place	2026 Zunyi	Team
Gold medal – first place	2026 Zunyi	Balance beam
Silver medal – second place	2023 Singapore	All-around
Silver medal – second place	2026 Zunyi	All-around
Bronze medal – third place	2026 Zunyi	Floor exercise
FIG World Cup
Event / 1st / 2nd / 3rd; Apparatus World Cup / 1 / 0 / 0

Zhang Qingying (born 21 May 2007) is a Chinese artistic gymnast. She was part of the gold medal winning teams at the 2026 World Championships, 2026 Asian Games, and the 2023 and 2026 Asian Championships. Individually she is the 2025 World Champion on balance beam and all-around bronze medalist and is the 2026 World silver medalist on balance beam.

== Gymnastics career ==
Zhang won the silver medal on vault at the 2022 Chinese Championships.

=== 2023–2024 ===
At the 2023 Chinese Championships, Zhang won the bronze medal in the all-around final. Then in the apparatus finals, she won a bronze medal on the vault and silver medals on the balance beam and floor exercise. She was then selected to compete at the 2023 Asian Championships along with Qiu Qiyuan, Zhang Xinyi, Zuo Tong, and Jia Ruoyi. The team won the gold medal, and Zhang won the individual all-around silver medal behind Qiu. She then won the gold medal in the balance beam by over one point and also won gold on the floor exercise. Later, she was selected to compete at the 2023 World Championships in Antwerp alongside Qiu, Ou Yushan, Zhou Yaqin, Huang Zhuofan and Wu Ran. The team finished in fourth place. Individually, she advanced into the balance beam final and finished sixth.

Zhang won a gold medal on the balance beam at the 2024 Baku World Cup. She only competed on the balance beam at the 2024 Chinese Championships, winning the silver medal to Zhou Yaqin. She was an alternate for China's 2024 Olympic team.

=== 2025 ===
At the Chinese Championships, Zhang helped Zhejiang win the team title, and she won the individual all-around title. She then won a silver medal in the balance beam final, behind Zhou Yaqin. She also placed seventh on the uneven bars and fourth on the floor exercise. She was selected to compete at the 2025 World Championships and advanced into the all-around final in fourth place and the balance beam final in first place. After hitting all four routines, she won the bronze medal in the all-around final, behind Angelina Melnikova and Leanne Wong. She said afterward that she was satisfied with her routines but "didn't expect to make the podium". She went on to win the gold medal in the balance beam final with a score of 15.166, 0.866 points ahead of the silver medalist Kaylia Nemour.

=== 2026 ===
Zhang competed at the 2026 American Cup, a mixed team event, where she helped team China win gold ahead of the United States. At the 2026 Asian Championships, Zhang helped China win gold as a team and individually she won silver in the all-around behind compatriot Ke Qinqin. During event finals, she won gold on balance beam and bronze on floor exercise. She next competed at the 2026 Asian Games. On the first day of the competition, Zhang placed fourth in the all-around. During the team final, she helped China win their fourteenth consecutive Asian Games team title. During event finals she won bronze on uneven bars behind Qiu Qiyuan and Misa Nishiyama, placed fifth on balance beam, and withdrew from the floor exercise final so teammate Zhang Yihan could compete.

At the 2026 World Championships, Zhang helped China qualify to the team final in first place and individually she qualified to the all-around and balance beam finals. During the team final, Zhang competed on all four apparatuses, helping China win their first World team gold in twenty years and ending the United States's gold medal winning streak they've had since 2011. During the all-around final Zhang finished ninth. For the balance beam final, Zhang recorded a score of 14.566, the highest of the day. However she lost the tie-breaker to Kaylia Nemour and won silver.

== Competitive history ==
Competitive history of Zhang Qingying
Year	Event	Team	AA	VT	UB	BB	FX
2019	Junior Chinese Championships		6				
2019	China National Youth Games	2nd place, silver medalist(s)	3rd place, bronze medalist(s)	1st place, gold medalist(s)			4
2020	Junior Chinese Championships		7	1st place, gold medalist(s)			
2021	Chinese Championships	3rd place, bronze medalist(s)					
2021	China National Youth Games	1st place, gold medalist(s)					
2022	Junior Chinese Championships		1st place, gold medalist(s)	1st place, gold medalist(s)	1st place, gold medalist(s)	1st place, gold medalist(s)	7
2022	Chinese Championships	2nd place, silver medalist(s)	9	2nd place, silver medalist(s)		8	
2023	Chinese Championships	2nd place, silver medalist(s)	3rd place, bronze medalist(s)	3rd place, bronze medalist(s)		2nd place, silver medalist(s)	2nd place, silver medalist(s)
2023	Asian Championships	1st place, gold medalist(s)	2nd place, silver medalist(s)	6		1st place, gold medalist(s)	1st place, gold medalist(s)
2023	World Championships	4				6	
2024	Baku World Cup					1st place, gold medalist(s)	
2024	Chinese Championships	1st place, gold medalist(s)				2nd place, silver medalist(s)	
2025	Chinese Championships	1st place, gold medalist(s)	1st place, gold medalist(s)		7	2nd place, silver medalist(s)	4
2025	Chinese National Games	1st place, gold medalist(s)	3rd place, bronze medalist(s)			3rd place, bronze medalist(s)	
2025	World Championships	—N/a	3rd place, bronze medalist(s)			1st place, gold medalist(s)	
2026	American Cup	1st place, gold medalist(s)					
2026	Chinese Championships	3rd place, bronze medalist(s)	2nd place, silver medalist(s)		7	1st place, gold medalist(s)	3rd place, bronze medalist(s)
2026	Asian Championships	1st place, gold medalist(s)	2nd place, silver medalist(s)			1st place, gold medalist(s)	3rd place, bronze medalist(s)
2026	Asian Games	1st place, gold medalist(s)	4		3rd place, bronze medalist(s)	5	WD
2026	World Championships	1st place, gold medalist(s)	9			2nd place, silver medalist(s)	
