= Xie Guying =

Chinese gymnast (born 2011)

Gymnastics career
- Discipline: Women's artistic gymnastics
- Country represented: China
Medal record
Representing China
Youth Olympic Games
Gold medal – first place	2026 Dakar	Team

Xie Guying (Chinese: 谢谷英) is a Chinese artistic gymnast and a member of China women's national artistic gymnastics team.

== Gymnastics career ==
In May 2026, Xie competed at the 2026 Chinese Artistic Gymnastics Championships and won a bronze medal on uneven bars. The next month she competed at the 2026 Junior Asian Gymnastics Championships and won gold in the team event. Individually she won gold on vault and uneven bars.

In November 2026, she represented China at the 2026 Summer Youth Olympics. She helped China qualify in first place in the team competition. Individually she finished first in the all-around qualification with 53.099 points. During the inaugural team final she helped China win gold with a score of 107.798.

== Competitive history ==
Competitive history of Xie Guying
Year	Event	Team	AA	VT	UB	BB	FX
2025
2025	Chinese Championships				2nd place, silver medalist(s)		
2026
2026	Chinese Championships				3rd place, bronze medalist(s)		
2026	Asian Championships	1st place, gold medalist(s)		1st place, gold medalist(s)	1st place, gold medalist(s)		
2026	Youth Olympic Games	1st place, gold medalist(s)					
