= Ke Qinqin =

Chinese artistic gymnast (born 2010)

- 柯沁沁
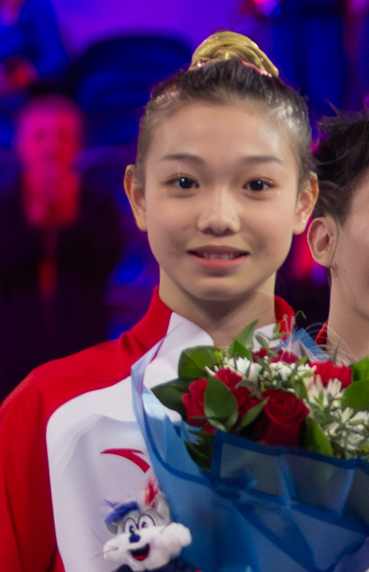
- Ke at the 2026 American Cup

Personal information
- Born: 29 June 2010 (age 16) Hubei, China

Gymnastics career
- Discipline: Women's artistic gymnastics
- Country represented: China; (2025–present)
Medal record
Representing China
Women's artistic gymnastics
World Championships
Gold medal – first place	2026 Rotterdam	Team
Bronze medal – third place	2026 Rotterdam	All-around
Asian Games
Gold medal – first place	2026 Aichi-Nagoya	Team
Silver medal – second place	2026 Aichi-Nagoya	All-around
Asian Championships
Gold medal – first place	2026 Zunyi	Team
Gold medal – first place	2026 Zunyi	All-around
Silver medal – second place	2026 Zunyi	Balance beam
FIG World Cup
Event / 1st / 2nd / 3rd; Apparatus World Cup / 1 / 1 / 0

Ke Qinqin (Chinese: 柯沁沁; born 29 June 2010) is a Chinese artistic gymnast. She is the 2026 Asian all-around champion as well as the 2026 Chinese National Champion, and was part of the gold medal winning team at the 2026 World Championships.

== Gymnastics career ==
=== 2023–2025 ===
Ke competed at the 2023 Chinese National Student-Youth Games where she helped Guangzhou win silver as a team. Individually she won gold on vault and balance beam and silver on uneven bars. At the 2024 Chinese Championships she placed sixth in the all-around.

Throughout 2025 Ke won the all-around titles at the Chinese Junior Championships, the Chinese Junior National Games, and the Chinese National Games.

=== 2026 ===
Ke became age-eligible for senior level competition in 2026. She made her debut at the 2026 American Cup where she contributed scores on the balance beam and floor exercise towards China's gold medal finish. She next competed at the 2026 Cairo World Cup where she won gold on floor exercise and silver on balance beam behind Kaylia Nemour. At the 2026 Chinese National Championships, Ke won her first senior level all-around title where she also won silver on floor exercise and bronze on balance beam.

At the 2026 Asian Championships, Ke helped China win gold as a team and individually she won gold in the all-around. She withdrew from the uneven bars final so compatriot Qiu Qiyuan could compete and won silver on balance beam behind Zhang Qingying. She next competed at the 2026 Asian Games. On the first day of the competition, Ke won silver in the all-around behind Aiko Sugihara of Japan. During the team final, she helped China win their fourteenth consecutive Asian Games team title. Ke withdrew from the uneven bars final so teammate Qiu could compete; she would go on to win gold. On the final day of the competition, Ke placed eighth on floor exercise after falling on one of her passes.

At the 2026 World Championships, Ke helped China qualify to the team final in first place and individually she qualified to the all-around final and was the third reserve for the uneven bars final. During the team final, Ke competed on vault, balance beam, and floor exercise, helping China win their first World team gold in twenty years and ending the United States' gold medal winning streak they've had since 2011. During the individual all-around final, Ke fell on her balance beam dismount. Despite this, she still won the bronze medal behind Skye Blakely and Liudmila Roshchina.

== Competitive history ==
Competitive history of Ke Qinqin
Year	Event	Team	AA	VT	UB	BB	FX
2023	Chinese National Student-Youth Games	2nd place, silver medalist(s)		1st place, gold medalist(s)	2nd place, silver medalist(s)	1st place, gold medalist(s)	
2024	Chinese Championships	2nd place, silver medalist(s)	6				
2025	Chinese Championships	2nd place, silver medalist(s)					
2025	Chinese Junior Championships	1st place, gold medalist(s)	1st place, gold medalist(s)				
2025	Chinese Junior National Games	1st place, gold medalist(s)	1st place, gold medalist(s)				
2025	Chinese National Games	2nd place, silver medalist(s)	1st place, gold medalist(s)		4	1st place, gold medalist(s)	2nd place, silver medalist(s)
2026	American Cup	1st place, gold medalist(s)					
2026	Cairo World Cup					2nd place, silver medalist(s)	1st place, gold medalist(s)
2026	Chinese Championships	1st place, gold medalist(s)	1st place, gold medalist(s)		5	3rd place, bronze medalist(s)	2nd place, silver medalist(s)
2026	Asian Championships	1st place, gold medalist(s)	1st place, gold medalist(s)		WD	2nd place, silver medalist(s)	
2026	Asian Games	1st place, gold medalist(s)	2nd place, silver medalist(s)		WD		8
2026	World Championships	1st place, gold medalist(s)	3rd place, bronze medalist(s)		R3		
