= Artistic gymnastics at the 2026 Summer Youth Olympics – Men's qualification =

Qualification for men's artistic gymnastics competitions at the 2026 Summer Youth Olympics was held on 7 November 2026 at the Dakar Expo Center. The results of the qualification determined the qualifiers to the finals: 8 teams in the team final, 18 gymnasts in the individual all-around final, and 8 gymnasts to make up half of the teams that would qualify for the mixed team final.

== Results ==
=== Team ===
Rank	Country	Floor (gymnastics)	Pommel horse	Rings (gymnastics)	Vault (gymnastics)	Parallel bars	Horizontal bar	Total	Qual.
1	China	27.432	24.899	25.966	28.332	25.833	26.766	159.228	Q
1	Li Lezheng	12.666	12.833	13.100	13.066	12.400	13.066	159.228	Q
1	Yang Lanbin	13.766	11.766	12.866	14.366	13.433	13.700	159.228	Q
1	Zhao Ruiyang	13.666	12.066	12.100	13.966	12.333	12.066	159.228	Q
2	Japan	26.500	24.400	25.633	27.632	26.699	27.732	158.596	Q
2	Hiroto Fujimoto	11.766	11.366	12.733	13.966	13.366	8.000	158.596	Q
2	Ikki Nishihara	12.900	12.600	12.666	13.200	12.733	13.766	158.596	Q
2	Naoto Shiroiwa	13.600	11.800	12.900	13.666	13.333	13.966	158.596	Q
3	Great Britain	25.500	26.333	24.933	26.999	23.933	25.132	152.830	Q
3	Uzair Chowdhury	13.300	13.433	13.133	13.933	14.133	12.866	152.830	Q
3	Benjamin Porter	11.833	12.100	11.800	13.066	9.800	12.266	152.830	Q
3	Lucas Scully	12.200	12.900	9.200	12.566	8.900	10.666	152.830	Q
4	Belgium	24.632	25.199	23.833	25.632	25.066	25.266	149.628	Q
4	Arthur Olyslaegers	12.166	11.866	11.600	12.266	12.100	12.500	149.628	Q
4	Rolin Maxime	12.466	11.933	12.133	13.066	12.966	12.766	149.628	Q
4	Henri Vanassche	9.133	13.266	11.700	12.566	11.900	11.300	149.628	Q
5	Germany	24.732	25.432	24.333	27.000	23.366	24.733	149.596	Q
5	Zeno Csuka	12.366	12.366	11.633	13.400	11.300	11.166	149.596	Q
5	Kimi Köhnlein	11.966	10.733	12.433	13.600	10.600	12.133	149.596	Q
5	Andrei Mihai	12.366	13.066	11.900	13.166	12.066	12.600	149.596	Q
6	Italy	23.533	24.099	24.300	26.633	23.999	25.566	148.130	Q
6	Michele Boschetti	11.833	11.466	11.033	13.233	11.566	12.366	148.130	Q
6	Giacomo Capuzzo	11.700	11.933	12.100	13.400	12.366	13.200	148.130	Q
6	Alessandro Salvati	11.600	12.166	12.200	12.333	11.633	12.200	148.130	Q
7	Egypt	25.032	23.266	24.033	25.333	24.400	23.700	145.764	Q
7	Mohamed Abdelkawy	10.800	10.733	11.933	12.066	10.266	12.000	145.764	Q
7	Mazen El-Sayed	12.266	11.133	12.100	12.600	11.600	9.566	145.764	Q
7	Abdallah Shaarawy	12.766	12.133	11.266	12.733	12.800	11.700	145.764	Q
8	Mexico	25.232	22.099	24.166	26.966	23.500	23.032	144.995	Q
8	Hugo Pérez	10.366	11.533	10.800	13.333	11.100	8.966	144.995	Q
8	Saul Valenzuela	12.366	9.933	12.300	13.133	11.700	10.066	144.995	Q
8	Lorenzo Zaragoza Riveira	12.866	10.566	11.866	13.633	11.800	12.966	144.995	Q
9	France	25.299	22.566	22.766	26.266	24.032	23.833	144.762	R1
9	Gael Cazin	12.566	10.233	11.633	12.900	11.266	11.433	144.762	R1
9	Hugo Jeanperrin	10.366	11.933	11.133	12.133	12.766	11.733	144.762	R1
9	Tom Jolivet	12.733	10.633	10.533	13.366	10.833	12.100	144.762	R1
10	Australia	25.400	21.433	23.066	25.632	23.466	22.432	141.429	R2
10	Isaac Gunasekera	11.733	8.700	10.133	12.033	11.333	10.666	141.429	R2
10	Oscar Scott	12.400	10.200	11.700	12.166	12.133	10.966	141.429	R2
10	Elijah Wu	13.000	11.233	11.366	13.466	10.500	11.466	141.429	R2
11	South Africa	23.299	22.532	23.166	24.133	23.832	23.799	140.761	R3
11	Gethin Davies-Vaneetvelde	10.766	11.566	11.633	12.533	12.066	12.266	140.761	R3
11	Frederik Savies-Vaneetvelde	12.533	10.966	11.533	11.600	11.766	11.533	140.761	R3
11	Pfumelo Shibambu	10.766	9.966	9.500	11.366	9.400	10.000	140.761	R3
12	Colombia	20.766	22.799	21.532	23.799	22.866	23.266	135.028	R4
12	Matías Ramos	10.666	11.266	11.266	12.166	11.566	11.800	135.028	R4
12	Maximiliano Salcedo	10.100	11.533	10.266	11.633	11.300	11.466	135.028	R4

=== All-around ===
Rank	Gymnast	Floor (gymnastics)	Pommel horse	Rings (gymnastics)	Vault (gymnastics)	Parallel bars	Horizontal bar	Total	Qual.
1	(United Kingdom) Uzair Chowdhury	13.300	13.433	13.133	13.933	14.133	12.866	80.798	Q
2	(China) Yang Lanbin	13.766	11.766	12.866	14.366	13.433	13.700	79.897	Q
3	(Japan) Naoto Shiroiwa	13.600	11.800	12.900	13.666	13.333	13.966	79.265	Q
4	(Japan) Ikki Nishihara	12.900	12.600	12.666	13.200	12.733	13.766	77.865	Q
5	(China) Li Lezheng	12.666	12.833	13.100	13.066	12.400	13.066	77.131	Q
6	(Russia) Daniil Smirnov	12.733	13.533	12.366	14.033	13.733	10.366	76.764	Q
7	(China) Zhao Ruiyang	13.666	12.066	12.100	13.966	12.333	12.066	76.197	–
8	(Belgium) Maxime Rolin	12.466	11.933	12.133	13.066	12.966	12.766	75.330	Q
9	(Germany) Andrei Mihai	12.366	13.066	11.900	13.166	12.066	12.600	75.164	Q
10	(Hungary) Áron Zsolt Horváth	11.900	11.833	12.500	13.700	12.433	12.633	74.999	Q
11	(Spain) Otger Carreres	11.833	13.233	11.966	13.333	12.300	12.300	74.965	Q
12	(Italy) Giacomo Capuzzo	11.700	11.933	12.100	13.400	12.366	13.200	74.699	Q
13	(Argentina) Benjamín Fernández	12.966	11.633	11.466	13.833	11.433	12.766	74.097	Q
14	(Mexico) Lorenzo Zaragoza Riveira	12.866	10.566	11.866	13.633	11.800	12.966	74.097	Q
15	(Austria) Samuel Wachter	12.200	11.666	12.233	13.200	12.266	12.100	73.665	Q
16	(Egypt) Abdallah Shaarawy	12.766	12.133	11.266	12.733	12.800	11.700	73.398	Q
17	(Canada) Jaydon de Silva	12.000	12.200	11.800	13.000	12.133	12.000	73.133	Q
18	(Israel) Tomer Tirosh	12.600	12.266	11.866	12.233	11.466	12.266	72.697	Q
19	(Belgium) Arthur Olyslaegers	12.166	11.866	11.600	12.266	12.100	12.500	72.498	Q
20	(Germany) Zeno Csuka	12.366	12.366	11.633	13.400	11.300	11.166	72.231	R1
21	(Italy) Alessandro Salvati	11.600	12.166	12.200	12.333	11.633	12.200	72.132	R2
22	(Turkey) Deniz Şükrüoğlu	12.566	12.366	11.466	12.466	12.000	11.166	72.030	R3
23	(Switzerland) Michael Buckley	12.300	11.900	10.666	12.200	12.433	12.166	72.030	R4
