= Japan at the 2026 Summer Youth Olympics =

- Flag of Japan
- IOC code: JPN
- NOC: Japanese Olympic Committee
- Website: www.joc.or.jp

in Dakar, Senegal October 31, 2026 – November 13, 2026
- Competitors: 45 in 17 sports
- Flag bearers: Miku Matsushima & Naito Arai
- Medals Ranked 2nd: Gold 11 Silver 8 Bronze 9 Total 28

Summer Youth Olympics appearances (overview)
- 2010; 2014; 2018; 2026

Japan competed at the 2026 Summer Youth Olympics in Dakar, Senegal from October 31 to November 13, 2026. This was the nation's fourth appearance at the Youth Olympics, after making its debut in 2010. Table tennis player Miku Matsushima and judoka Naito Arai served as the flag bearers for the opening ceremony.

== Medalists ==
Medal	Name	Sport	Event	Date
Gold	Mana Ishikawa	Swimming	Girls' 200 m breaststroke	2 November
Gold	Iori Miyazaki	Swimming	Boys' 200 m breaststroke	2 November
Gold	Mana Ishikawa	Swimming	Girls' 100 m breaststroke	3 November
Gold	Ryuusei Kawakami; Miku Matsushima	Table tennis	Mixed doubles	3 November
Gold	Mana Ishikawa	Swimming	Girls' 200 m individual medley	4 November
Gold	Iori Miyazaki	Swimming	Boys' 200 m individual medley	4 November
Gold	Mana Ishikawa	Swimming	Girls' 50 m breaststroke	5 November
Gold	Ryuusei Kawakami	Table tennis	Boys' singles	5 November
Gold	Koki Hasebe	Athletics	Boys' long jump	8 November
Gold	Kenshin Sakuno	Boxing	Boys' 65 kg	12 November
Gold	Hiyo Yamada	Breaking	B-Girls	13 November
Silver	Iori Miyazaki	Swimming	Boys' 100 m breaststroke	3 November
Silver	Iori Miyazaki	Swimming	Boys' 50 m breaststroke	5 November
Silver	Reisa Kojima	Beach wrestling	Girls' 55 kg	7 November
Silver	Masashi Maeda	Fencing	Boys' foil	9 November
Silver	Hiroto Fujimoto; Ikki Nishihara; Naoto Shiroiwa	Gymnastics	Boys' team all-around	9 November
Silver	Yume Minamino; Kanon Nakashima; Nanami Togo	Gymnastics	Girls' team all-around	9 November
Silver	Noriyuki Takano	Athletics	Boys' 400 m hurdles	10 November
Silver	Yume Minamino; Ikki Nishihara	Gymnastics	Mixed team	11 November
Bronze	Naito Arai	Judo	Boys' 100 kg	3 November
Bronze	Shiki Kawamura	Wushu	Boys' taijiquan combined	3 November
Bronze	Daiki Nishizaki	Triathlon	Boys' individual	5 November
Bronze	Yuzuno Watanabe	Badminton	Girls' singles	5 November
Bronze	Kiyora Matsuura	Athletics	Girls' pole vault	8 November
Bronze	Ikki Nishihara	Gymnastics	Boys' individual all-around	10 November
Bronze	Futo Abe	Athletics	Boys' 5000 m walk	10 November
Bronze	Yura Kanemaru	Boxing	Girls' 54 kg	11 November
Bronze	Ayano Mochii	Boxing	Girls' 60 kg	11 November

Medals by sport
Sport	1st place, gold medalist(s)	2nd place, silver medalist(s)	3rd place, bronze medalist(s)	Total
Swimming	6	2	0	8
Table tennis	2	0	0	2
Athletics	1	1	2	4
Boxing	1	0	2	3
Breaking	1	0	0	1
Fencing	0	1	0	1
Gymnastics	0	3	1	4
Beach wrestling	0	1	0	1
Badminton	0	0	1	1
Judo	0	0	1	1
Triathlon	0	0	1	1
Wushu	0	0	1	1
Total	11	8	9	28

Medals by gender
Sport	1st place, gold medalist(s)	2nd place, silver medalist(s)	3rd place, bronze medalist(s)	Total
Boys	5	5	5	15
Girls	5	2	4	11
Mixed	1	1	0	2
Total	11	8	9	28

== Competitors ==
The following is the list of number of competitors participating at the Games per sport/discipline.

Sport	Men	Women	Total
Archery	1	1	2
Artistic gymnastics	3	3	6
Athletics	3	4	7
Badminton	0	1	1
Beach volleyball	0	2	2
Beach wrestling	0	1	1
Boxing	1	2	3
Breaking	0	1	1
Coastal rowing	0	1	1
Fencing	1	0	1
Judo	1	0	1
Cycling	0	1	1
Rugby sevens	12	0	12
Swimming	1	1	2
Table tennis	1	1	2
Triathlon	1	0	1
Wushu	1	0	0
Total	26	19	45

== Archery ==
Japan entered two archers, one of each gender.

Athlete	Event	Ranking Round		Round of 16	Quarterfinals	Semifinals	Final / BM	Rank
Athlete	Event	Score	Seed	Opposition Score	Opposition Score	Opposition Score	Opposition Score	Rank
Takara Daimon	Men's individual	666	14 Q	Palomo (ESP); L (5–6)	Did not advance			
Yuika Kamiyanagi	Women's individual	647	12 Q	Rossier (SUI); L (6–0)	Did not advance			
Yuika Kamiyanagi; Takara Daimon	Mixed team	1313	10 Q	Edlich/Conrad (GER); W (5–1)	Yenihayat/Gulay (TUR); L (3–5)	Did not advance		

== Artistic gymnastics ==
Japan entered a team of six gymnast, three of each gender.

Boys
Team

Athlete	Event	Qualification								Final							
Athlete	Event	Apparatus						Total	Rank	Apparatus						Total	Rank
Athlete	Event	F	PH	R	V	PB	HB	Total	Rank	F	PH	R	V	PB	HB	Total	Rank
Hiroto Fujimoto	Team	11.766	11.366	12.733	13.966	13.366	8.000	71.197	27	12.833	12.266	12.733	14.333	13.200		—N/a	
Ikki Nishihara	Team	12.900	12.600	12.666	13.200	12.733	13.766	77.865	4 Q	12.600	13.000			13.466	13.500	—N/a	
Naoto Shiroiwa	Team	13.600	11.800	12.900	13.666	13.333	13.966	79.265	3 Q			12.700	13.733		11.866	—N/a	
Total	Team	26.500	24.400	25.633	27.632	26.699	27.732	158.596	2 Q	25.433	25.266	25.433	28.066	26.666	25.366	156.230	2nd place, silver medalist(s)

Individual all-around

Athlete	Event	Final							
Athlete	Event	Apparatus						Total	Rank
Athlete	Event	F	PH	R	V	PB	HB	Total	Rank
Ikki Nishihara	All-around	13.466	13.100	11.733	13.300	13.700	13.766	79.065	3rd place, bronze medalist(s)
Naoto Shiroiwa	All-around	13.233	12.333	11.900	12.400	13.133	13.266	76.265	5

Girls
Team

Athlete	Event	Qualification						Final					
Athlete	Event	Apparatus				Total	Rank	Apparatus				Total	Rank
Athlete	Event	V	UB	BB	FX	Total	Rank	V	UB	BB	FX	Total	Rank
Yume Minamino	Team	13.700	11.933	13.766	13.066	52.465	4 Q	13.866	13.700	13.566	12.866	—N/a	
Kanon Nakashima	Team	13.100	13.366	12.700	12.166	51.332	8		13.866	12.900		—N/a	
Nanami Togo	Team	13.600	13.300	12.633	12.866	52.399	5 Q	13.700			13.100	—N/a	
Total	Team	27.300	26.666	26.466	25.932	106.364	2 Q	27.566	27.566	26.466	25.966	107.564	2nd place, silver medalist(s)

Individual all-around

Athlete	Event	Final					
Athlete	Event	Apparatus				Total	Rank
Athlete	Event	V	UB	BB	FX	Total	Rank
Yume Minamino	All-around	13.333	13.700	13.766	11.800	52.599	5
Nanami Togo	All-around	13.500	13.466	12.666	12.900	52.532	6

Mixed
Mixed team

Athlete	Event	Final																				
Athlete	Event	Round 1							Round 2							Round 3						
Athlete	Event	Apparatus					Total	Rank	Apparatus					Total	Rank	Apparatus					Total	Rank
Athlete	Event	F	PB	HB	UB	BB	Total	Rank	F	PB	HB	UB	BB	Total	Rank	F	PB	HB	UB	BB	Total	Rank
Ikki Nishihara	Mixed team	13.200	—N/a				26.600	1 Q	—N/a	13.700	—N/a			26.333	2 Q	—N/a		13.900	—N/a		25.966	2nd place, silver medalist(s)
Yume Minamino	Mixed team	—N/a				13.400	26.600	1 Q	12.633	—N/a				26.333	2 Q	—N/a			12.066	—N/a	25.966	2nd place, silver medalist(s)

== Athletics ==
Japan entered seven athletes, three male and four female.

=== Track & road events ===
Men

Athlete	Event	Semifinal		Final	
Athlete	Event	Result	Rank	Result	Rank
Noriyuki Takano	400 m hurdles	52.49	2 Q	50.88	2nd place, silver medalist(s)
Futo Abe	5000 m race walk	—N/a		21:09.22	3rd place, bronze medalist(s)

Women

Athlete	Event	Semifinal		Final	
Athlete	Event	Result	Rank	Result	Rank
Hikari Osaka	5000 m race walk	—N/a		DNS	

=== Field events ===
Men

Athlete	Event	Final	
Athlete	Event	Distance	Position
Koki Hasebe	Long jump	7.45	1st place, gold medalist(s)

Women

Athlete	Event	Final	
Athlete	Event	Distance	Position
Kiyora Matsuura	Pole vault	3.60	3rd place, bronze medalist(s)
Reisa Nagata	Discus throw	37.10	6
Niko Nozawa	Triple jump	12.33	6

== Badminton ==
Japan entered one female athlete.

Athlete	Event	Group stage				Quarterfinals	Semifinals	Final / BM	
Athlete	Event	Opposition Result	Opposition Result	Opposition Result	Rank	Opposition Result	Opposition Result	Opposition Result	Rank
Yuzuno Watanabe	Women's singles	Nethmi (SRI); W (2–0)	Ayudis (INA); W (2–0)	Elsa (MRI); W (2–0)	1 Q	Wang (NZL); W (2–0)	Patri (IND); L (1-2)	Cheng (TPE); W (2–0)	3rd place, bronze medalist(s)

== Beach volleyball ==
Japan received a quota place for the women's tournament.

Summary

Team	Event	Group stage				Round of 16	Quarterfinals	Semifinals	Final / PG / BM	
Team	Event	Opposition Result	Opposition Result	Opposition Result	Rank	Opposition Result	Opposition Result	Opposition Result	Opposition Result	Rank
Auru Kato; Mei Nakagawa	Women's tournament	Joy/Pamela (NGR); W (2–1)	Lafuenti/Coretti (ITA); L (0-2)	Karma/Marwa (EGY); L (0-2)	4	Did not advance				

== Beach wrestling ==
Japan entered one female athlete.

Women

Athlete	Weight	Group stage				Semifinals	Final / BM	
Athlete	Weight	Opposition Result	Opposition Result	Opposition Result	Rank	Opposition Result	Opposition Result	Rank
Reisa Kojima	–55 kg	Pavel (ROU); W (3–1)	Star (NRO); W (3–0)	Rodríguez (PER); W (3–0)	1 Q	Manzanza (COD); W (3–0)	Diatta (SEN); L (1–5)	2nd place, silver medalist(s)

== Boxing ==
Japan entered three athletes, one male and two female.

Men

Athlete	Weight	Round of 16	Quarterfinals	Semifinals	Final / BM	
Athlete	Weight	Opposition Result	Opposition Result	Opposition Result	Opposition Result	Rank
Kenshin Sakuno	–65 kg	Lezoul (ALG); W (5–0)	Khoshimov (TJK); W (5–0)	Katvalyan (ARM); W (3–2)	Prohnevsky (ISR); W (4–1)	1st place, gold medalist(s)

Women

Athlete	Weight	Round of 16	Quarterfinals	Semifinals	Final / BM	
Athlete	Weight	Opposition Result	Opposition Result	Opposition Result	Opposition Result	Rank
Yura Kanemaru	–54 kg	Castillo (VEN); W (5–0)	Adnane (MAR); W (RSC)	Trejos (COL); L (0-5)	Did not advance	3rd place, bronze medalist(s)
Ayano Mochii	–60 kg	Kolitapa (FIJ); W (4–1)	Uraimzhanova (KGZ); W (5–0)	Kollarova (SVK); L (1–4)	Did not advance	3rd place, bronze medalist(s)

== Breaking ==
Japan entered one female athlete.

Athlete	Nickname	Event	Group Stage				Quarterfinal	Semifinal	Final / BM	
Athlete	Nickname	Event	Opposition Result	Opposition Result	Opposition Result	Rank	Opposition Result	Opposition Result	Opposition Result	Rank
Hiyo Yamada	Hiyo	B-Girls	Reese (MAS); W (2–0)	Queen Lolita (FRA); W (2–0)	Suzz (SEN); W (2–0)	1 Q	Minji (KOR); W (3–0)	Nawel (MAR); W (3–0)	Nikastar (UKR); W (2–1)	1st place, gold medalist(s)

== Coastal rowing ==
Japan entered one female rower.

Women

Athlete	Event	Time Trial A		Time Trial B		Round of 16	Quarterfinals	Semifinals	Final / BM
Athlete	Event	Result	Rank	Result	Rank	Opposition Result	Opposition Result	Opposition Result	Rank
Maki Asakura	Solo	3:26.22	26	3:06:47	15	Did not advance			

== Fencing ==
Japan entered one male athlete.

Athlete	Event	Pool							Table of 16	Quarterfinal	Semifinal	Final / BM	
Athlete	Event	Opposition Result	Opposition Result	Opposition Result	Opposition Result	Opposition Result	Opposition Result	Rank	Opposition Result	Opposition Result	Opposition Result	Opposition Result	Rank
Masashi Maeda	Men's foil	Maslau (BLR); W (5–2)	Juras (LTU); W (5–0)	Novak (CZE); W (5–1)	Eldeeb (QAT); W (5–3)	Belbouab (GBR); W (5–2)	Thiam (MLI); W (5–1)	1 Q	Bye	Eldeeb (QAT); W (15–10)	Belbouab (GBR); W (15–13)	Ho (HKG); L (8–15)	2nd place, silver medalist(s)

== Judo ==
Japan entered one male judoka based on the available quotas assigned by the International Judo Federation.

Men

Athlete	Event	Round of 16	Quarterfinals	Repechage		Final / BM	
Athlete	Event	Opposition Result	Opposition Result	Opposition Result	Opposition Result	Opposition Result	Rank
Naito Arai	–100 kg	Chinon (THA); W 110–000	Eshpulatov (UZB); L 000–110	Li (TPE); W 100–000	Simic (SRB); W 100–000	Joao (ANG); W 100–000	3rd place, bronze medalist(s)

== Road cycling ==
Japan entered one female athlete.

Women

Athlete	Event	Time	Rank
Ririne Tsunashima	Road race	1:31:19	19
Ririne Tsunashima	Time trial	13:22.94	28

== Rugby sevens ==
Japan entered a team for the men's tournament.

Summary

Event	Classification match				Semifinal	Placement match	
Event	Opposition Score	Opposition Score	Opposition Score	Group Rank	Opposition Score	Opposition Score	Rank
Men's tournament	France; L (0–48)	Argentina; L (5–31)	Uganda; W (41–7)	3	Senegal; W (19-5)	Germany; L (10–26)	6

Roster

- Koki Akimoto
- Ryuki Fukuyama
- Tatsuhiko Ishikawa
- Yusuke Kami
- Takumi Kito
- Ouga Koike
- Takenosuke Nomura
- Towa Okuno
- Rio Riabcev
- Reo Shiratani
- Kakeru Suzuki
- Keisuke Tsuji

== Swimming ==
Japan entered two swimmers, one male and one female.

Athlete	Event	Heat		Final	
Athlete	Event	Time	Rank	Time	Rank
Iori Miyazaki	50 m breaststroke	28.93	4	28.42	2nd place, silver medalist(s)
Iori Miyazaki	100 m breaststroke	1:02.71	5	1:01.30	2nd place, silver medalist(s)
Iori Miyazaki	200 m breaststroke	2:16.35	2	2:12.33	1st place, gold medalist(s)
Iori Miyazaki	200 m individual medley	2:05.93	3	2:00.71	1st place, gold medalist(s)
Mana Ishikawa	50 m breaststroke	32.17	2	31.76	1st place, gold medalist(s)
Mana Ishikawa	100 m breaststroke	1:09.96	1	1:08.81	1st place, gold medalist(s)
Mana Ishikawa	200 m breaststroke	2:29.37	1	2:26.50	1st place, gold medalist(s)
Mana Ishikawa	200 m individual medley	2:13.25	1	2:13.06	1st place, gold medalist(s)

== Table tennis ==
Japan entered two athletes (one male and one female).

=== Singles ===
Athlete	Event	Group stage				Round of 16	Quarterfinals	Semifinals	Final / PG / BM	
Athlete	Event	Opposition Result	Opposition Result	Opposition Result	Rank	Opposition Result	Opposition Result	Opposition Result	Opposition Result	Rank
Ryuusei Kawakami	Men's singles	Asmu (ARG); W (3–0)	Okano (BRA); W (3–0)	Ganiou (BEN); W (3–0)	1 Q	Elsayed (EGY); W (4–0)	Moreno (PUR); W (4–0)	Lee (KOR); W (4–2)	Otalvaro (COL); W (4–2)	1st place, gold medalist(s)
Miku Matsushima	Women's singles	Borges (BRA); W (3–0)	Kashyap (ANT); W (3–0)	Aquije (PER); W (3–0)	1 Q	Vijitviriyagul (THA); W (4–2)	Rajkowska (POL); W (4–0)	Chen (TPE); L (0–4)	Su (HKG); L (3–4)	4

=== Mixed doubles ===
Pair	Event	Round of 32	Round of 16	Quarterfinals	Semifinals	Final / BM	
Pair	Event	Opposition Result	Opposition Result	Opposition Result	Opposition Result	Opposition Result	Rank
Ryuusei Kawakami; Miku Matsushima	Mixed doubles	Bye	Aidli/Saidi (TUN); W (3–0)	Li/Yao (CHN); W (3–1)	Lin/Chen (TPE); W (3–1)	Li/Su (HKG); W (3–1)	1st place, gold medalist(s)

== Triathlon ==
Japan entered one male athlete.

Athlete	Event	Time						Rank
Athlete	Event	Swim (750m)	Trans 1	Bike (20km)	Trans 2	Run (5km)	Total	Rank
Daiki Nishizaki	Men's individual	08:28	00:20	28:21	00:23	15:55	53:27	3rd place, bronze medalist(s)

== Wushu ==
Japan entered one male athlete after quotas were assigned by the International Wushu Federation.

Athlete	Event	Preliminary				Final			
Athlete	Event	Taijiquan	Taijishan	Total	Rank	Taijiquan	Taijishan	Total	Rank
Shiki Kawamura	Men's taijiquan combined	9.230 (5)	9.330 (4)	18.560	5 Q	9.333 (4)	9.330 (3)	18.663	3rd place, bronze medalist(s)
