= Egypt at the 2026 Summer Youth Olympics =

- Flag of Egypt
- IOC code: EGY
- NOC: Egyptian Olympic Committee
- Website: www.egyptianolympic.org

in Dakar, Senegal October 31, 2026 – November 13, 2026
- Competitors: 44 in 18 sports
- Flag bearers: Malayka Mohamed & Yassin El Bassiuony
- Medals: Gold 6 Silver 1 Bronze 5 Total 12

Summer Youth Olympics appearances (overview)
- 2010; 2014; 2018; 2026

Egypt is scheduled to compete at the 2026 Summer Youth Olympics in Dakar, Senegal from October 31 to November 13, 2026. This will mark Egypt's fourth appearance at the Youth Olympics, after making its debut in 2010.

Badminton player Malayka Mohamed and equestrian Yassin El Bassiuony served as the flag bearers for the opening ceremony.

== Medalists ==
| Medal | Name | Sport | Event | Date |
|---|---|---|---|---|
| Gold | Zain Hesham | Swimming | Men's 100 m butterfly | 1 November |
| Gold | Sondos Sonbol | Wushu | Women's changquan combined | 3 November |
| Gold | Zain Hesham | Swimming | Men's 50 m butterfly | 4 November |
| Gold | Zain Hesham | Swimming | Men's 200 m butterfly | 6 November |
| Gold | Youssef Kamal | Taekwondo | Men's 48 kg | 8 November |
| Gold | Yahya Sawaby | Athletics | Men's Discus throw | 9 November |
| Silver | Sara Ismail | Fencing | Women's foil | 8 November |
| Bronze | Aly Elramly | Judo | Men's 81 kg | 2 November |
| Bronze | Mohamed Ismail | Athletics | Men's hammer throw | 8 November |
| Bronze | Ahmed Mohamed | Athletics | Men's High jump | 9 November |
| Bronze | Alaa Belal | Athletics | Women's Shot put | 10 November |
| Bronze | Menatalla Ibrahim | Boxing | Women's 60 kg | 11 November |

== Competitors ==
The following is the list of number of competitors participating at the Games per sport/discipline.

| Sport | Men | Women | Total |
|---|---|---|---|
| 3x3 basketball | 0 | 4 | 4 |
| Archery | 1 | 1 | 2 |
| Artistic gymnastics | 3 | 3 | 6 |
| Athletics | 6 | 4 | 10 |
| Badminton | 1 | 1 | 2 |
| Beach volleyball | 0 | 2 | 2 |
| Beach wrestling | 1 | 1 | 2 |
| Boxing | 2 | 2 | 4 |
| Coastal rowing | 1 | 1 | 2 |
| Equestrian | 1 | 0 | 1 |
| Fencing | 0 | 1 | 1 |
| Judo | 1 | 0 | 1 |
| Sailing | 1 | 0 | 1 |
| Swimming | 1 | 0 | 1 |
| Table tennis | 1 | 1 | 2 |
| Taekwondo | 1 | 0 | 1 |
| Triathlon | 0 | 1 | 1 |
| Wushu | 0 | 1 | 1 |
| Total | 21 | 23 | 44 |

== 3x3 basketball ==
Egypt entered a team for the women's tournament as one of the three participating teams from Africa.

Summary

| Team | Event | Group stage | | | Quarterfinal | Semifinal | Final / BM | |
| Team | Event | Opposition Score | Opposition Score | Rank | Opposition Score | Opposition Score | Opposition Score | Rank |
|---|---|---|---|---|---|---|---|---|
| Egypt women's | Women's tournament | Czech Republic; W 12–8 | Ukraine; W 11–10 | 1 Q | Kenya; W 14–13 | Poland; L 14–19 | Senegal; L 17–18 | 4 |

=== Women's tournament ===
Team roster

- Leila Attia Eissa
- Joudi El-Sayed
- Mariam El-Sayed El-Shenawy
- Hania Hassa Belnaby

== Archery ==
Egypt entered two archers, one of each gender.

| Athlete | Event | Ranking Round | | Round of 32 | Round of 16 | Quarterfinals | Semifinals | Final / BM | Rank |
| Athlete | Event | Score | Seed | Opposition Score | Opposition Score | Opposition Score | Opposition Score | Opposition Score | Rank |
|---|---|---|---|---|---|---|---|---|---|
| Ismail Ezzeldin | Men's individual | 688 | 2 Q | Konaté (GUI); W 6–0 | Akunevich (BLR); W 6–2 | Penna (AUS); W 7–3 | Lamouret (FRA); L 2–6 | Lee (KOR); L 2–6 | 4 |
| Nouray Elsayed | Women's individual | 638 | 15 Q | Meijerse (NED); W 6–0 | Kim (KOR); W 6–5 | Yeo (SGP); L 0–6 | did not advance | | =7 |
| Ismail Ezzeldin; Nouray Elsayed | Mixed team | 1326 | 6 Q | —N/a | United Arab Emirates (UAE); L 4–5 | did not advance | | | 12 |

== Artistic gymnastics ==
Egypt entered six gymnasts, three of each gender.

Men
Team

| Athlete | Event | Qualification | | | | | | | | Final | | | | | | | |
| Athlete | Event | Apparatus | | | | | | Total | Rank | Apparatus | | | | | | Total | Rank |
| Athlete | Event | F | PH | R | V | PB | HB | Total | Rank | F | PH | R | V | PB | HB | Total | Rank |
|---|---|---|---|---|---|---|---|---|---|---|---|---|---|---|---|---|---|
| Mohamed Abdelkawy | Team | 10.800 | 10.733 | 11.933 | 12.066 | 10.266 | 12.000 | 67.798 | 44 | —N/a | 12.900 | —N/a | | 11.566 | 11.966 | —N/a | |
| Mazen El-Sayed | Team | 12.266 | 11.133 | 12.100 | 12.600 | 11.600 | 9.566 | 69.265 | 40 | 11.566 | —N/a | 11.733 | 12.133 | —N/a | | —N/a | |
| Abdallah Shaarawy | Team | 12.766 | 12.133 | 11.266 | 12.733 | 12.800 | 11.700 | 73.398 | 16 Q | 12.266 | 12.233 | 11.900 | 13.266 | 11.700 | 12.333 | —N/a | |
| Total | Team | 25.032 | 23.266 | 24.033 | 25.333 | 24.400 | 23.700 | 145.764 | 7 Q | 23.832 | 25.133 | 23.633 | 25.399 | 23.266 | 24.299 | 145.562 | 6 |

Individual all-around

| Athlete | Event | Final | | | | | | | |
| Athlete | Event | Apparatus | | | | | | Total | Rank |
| Athlete | Event | F | PH | R | V | PB | HB | Total | Rank |
|---|---|---|---|---|---|---|---|---|---|
| Abdallah Shaarawy | All-around | 12.433 | 12.066 | 11.600 | 12.600 | 13.166 | 12.266 | 74.131 | 10 |

Women
Team

| Athlete | Event | Qualification | | | | | | Final | | | | | |
| Athlete | Event | Apparatus | | | | Total | Rank | Apparatus | | | | Total | Rank |
| Athlete | Event | V | UB | BB | FX | Total | Rank | V | UB | BB | FX | Total | Rank |
|---|---|---|---|---|---|---|---|---|---|---|---|---|---|
| Karma Khamis | Team | 12.666 | 11.033 | 11.200 | 11.666 | 46.565 | 26 | 11.966 | —N/a | | 11.266 | —N/a | |
| Tia El-Midany | Team | 12.366 | 11.966 | 11.833 | 12.100 | 48.265 | 17 Q | 12.366 | 10.733 | 12.533 | 12.066 | —N/a | |
| Lara Soliman | Team | 11.533 | 12.000 | 11.633 | 10.566 | 45.732 | 29 | —N/a | 12.100 | 10.700 | —N/a | —N/a | |
| Total | Team | 25.032 | 23.966 | 23.466 | 23.766 | 96.230 | 7 Q | 24.332 | 22.833 | 23.233 | 23.332 | 93.730 | 5 |

Individual all-around

| Athlete | Event | Final | | | | | |
| Athlete | Event | Apparatus | | | | Total | Rank |
| Athlete | Event | V | UB | BB | FX | Total | Rank |
|---|---|---|---|---|---|---|---|
| Tia El-Midany | All-around | 12.566 | 9.466 | 12.033 | 12.100 | 46.165 | 17 |

Mixed

| Athlete | Event | Final | | | | | | | | | | | | | | | | | | | | |
| Athlete | Event | Round 1 | | | | | | | Round 2 | | | | | | | Round 3 | | | | | | |
| Athlete | Event | Apparatus | | | | | Total | Rank | Apparatus | | | | | Total | Rank | Apparatus | | | | | Total | Rank |
| Athlete | Event | F | PB | HB | UB | BB | Total | Rank | F | PB | HB | UB | BB | Total | Rank | F | PB | HB | UB | BB | Total | Rank |
|---|---|---|---|---|---|---|---|---|---|---|---|---|---|---|---|---|---|---|---|---|---|---|
| Abdallah Shaarawy | Mixed team | —N/a | 13.233 | —N/a | | | 25.299 | 8 Q | 11.633 | —N/a | | | | 22.733 | 6 | did not advance | | | | | | |
| Tia El-Midany | Mixed team | 11.166 | —N/a | | | | 25.299 | 8 Q | —N/a | | | | 11.100 | 22.733 | 6 | did not advance | | | | | | |

== Athletics ==
Egypt entered ten athletes, six male and four female.

=== Track & road events ===
Men

| Athlete | Event | Semifinal | | Final | |
| Athlete | Event | Result | Rank | Result | Rank |
|---|---|---|---|---|---|
| Saleh Mahmoud | 2000 m steeplechase | —N/a | | 5:56.83 PB | 9 |
| Youseff Mohamed | 5000 m race walk | —N/a | | TR54.7.5 | DQ |

=== Field events ===
Men

| Athlete | Event | Final | |
| Athlete | Event | Distance | Position |
|---|---|---|---|
| Alyeldin Ibrahim | Pole vault | 4.20 =PB | 7 |
| Mohamed Ismail | Hammer throw | 69.72 | Bronze medal |
| Ahmed Mohamed | High jump | 2.09 PB | Bronze medal |
| Yahya Sawaby | Discus throw | 68.23 PB | Gold medal |

Women

| Athlete | Event | Final | |
| Athlete | Event | Distance | Position |
|---|---|---|---|
| Alaa Belal | Shot put | 15.92 | Bronze medal |
| Mariem Elgamal | Hammer throw | 54.28 PB | 5 |
| Hanin Elshebokshi | Pole vault | XXX | NM |
| Remas Elweilily | Javelin throw | 51.64 PB | 4 |

== Badminton ==
Egypt entered two athletes, one of each gender.

| Athlete | Event | Group stage | | | | Quarterfinal | Semifinal | Final / BM | |
| Athlete | Event | Opposition Score | Opposition Score | Opposition Score | Rank | Opposition Score | Opposition Score | Opposition Score | Rank |
|---|---|---|---|---|---|---|---|---|---|
| Omar Elsaban | Men's singles | Neelam (AUS); L 0–2 | Deters (GER); L 0–2 | Jung (KOR); L 0–2 | 4 | did not advance | | | =25 |
| Malayka Mohamed | Women's singles | Bhardwaj (ZAM); W 2–0 | Luo (CAN); L 0–2 | Sum (HKG); L 0–2 | 3 | did not advance | | | =17 |

== Beach volleyball ==
Egypt received a quota place for the women's tournament.

Summary

| Team | Event | Group stage | | | | Preliminary round | Round of 16 | Quarterfinals | Semifinals | Final / BM | |
| Team | Event | Opposition Result | Opposition Result | Opposition Result | Rank | Opposition Result | Opposition Result | Opposition Result | Opposition Result | Opposition Result | Rank |
|---|---|---|---|---|---|---|---|---|---|---|---|
| Karma Badawy; Marwa Saleh | Women's tournament | Coretti/Lafuenti (ITA); L 0–2 | Bawa/Lawrence (NGR); L 0–2 | Kato/Nakagawa (JPN); W 2–0 | 3 Q | Mabjaia/Machava (MOZ); W 2–0 | Both/Groot (NED); L 0–2 | did not advance | | | =9 |

== Beach wrestling ==
Egypt entered two athletes, one of each gender.

Men

| Team | Event | Group stage | | | | Semifinals | Final / BM | |
| Team | Event | Opposition Result | Opposition Result | Opposition Result | Rank | Opposition Result | Opposition Result | Rank |
|---|---|---|---|---|---|---|---|---|
| Mohamed Hafez | –70 kg | Sarr (SEN); L 1–3 | Anuj (IND); W 3–2 | Torabi (IRI); L 0–3 | 2 | did not advance | | 7 |

Women

| Team | Event | Group stage | | | | Semifinals | Final / BM | |
| Team | Event | Opposition Result | Opposition Result | Opposition Result | Rank | Opposition Result | Opposition Result | Rank |
|---|---|---|---|---|---|---|---|---|
| Malak Abdelgalil | –65 kg | Sandin (FRA); W 2–0 | Bukhtina (UKR); W 3–0 | Rachiteanu (MDA); W 3–2 | 1 Q | Eningo (ESP); L 0–1 | Erkhembaatar (MGL); L 2–6 | 4 |

== Boxing ==
Egypt entered four athletes, two of each gender.

Men

| Athlete | Weight | Round of 16 | Quarterfinals | Semifinals | Final | |
| Athlete | Weight | Opposition Result | Opposition Result | Opposition Result | Opposition Result | Rank |
|---|---|---|---|---|---|---|
| Fahd Wazir | –65 kg | —N/a | Katvalyan (ARM); L RSC R2 2:59 | did not advance | | =5 |
| Ahmed Mobarak | –70 kg | —N/a | Maughan (GBR); L WP 0–5 | did not advance | | =5 |

Women

| Athlete | Weight | Round of 16 | Quarterfinals | Semifinals | Final | |
| Athlete | Weight | Opposition Result | Opposition Result | Opposition Result | Opposition Result | Rank |
|---|---|---|---|---|---|---|
| Hajer Wahba | –54 kg | —N/a | Tolepbergen (KAZ); L WP 0–5 | did not advance | | =5 |
| Menatalla Ibrahim | –60 kg | —N/a | Wang (CHN); W RSC R2 1:13 | Isoeva (UZB); L WP 0–5 | did not advance | Bronze medal |

== Coastal rowing ==
Egypt entered two rowers, one of each gender.

| Athlete | Event | Time trial 1 | | Time trial 2 | | Round of 16 | Quarterfinal | Semifinal | Final / BM | |
| Athlete | Event | Time | Rank | Time | Rank | Opposition Time | Opposition Time | Opposition Time | Opposition Time | Rank |
|---|---|---|---|---|---|---|---|---|---|---|
| Yosuff Moursi | Men's solo | 2:40.60 | 2 Q | —N/a | | Morelos (MEX); W 2:21.01–2:23.25 | Juntao (CHN); W 2:26.09–2:29.52 | Molina (ESP); L 4:08.74–2:45.32 | Moor (HUN); L 2:24.20–2:23.57 | 4 |
| Alia Ali | Women's solo | 3:10.38 | 12 | 2:59.29 | 2 Q | Özdemir (TUR); L 3:02.71–2:43.95 | did not advance | | | 15 |
| Yosuff Moursi; Alia Ali | Mixed double sculls | 2:43.24 | 13 | 2:26.51 | 1 Q | Schoenhuber/Lux (AUT); L 2:21.32–2:19.26 | did not advance | | | 12 |

== Equestrian ==
Egypt received a quota place as one of the four invited NOCs from Africa.

| Athlete | Horse | Event | Qualification | | | | | | | | Final | | |
| Athlete | Horse | Event | Round A | | | Round B | | | Total | | Final | | |
| Athlete | Horse | Event | Penalties | Time | Rank | Penalties | Time | Rank | Penalties | Rank | Penalties | Time | Rank |
|---|---|---|---|---|---|---|---|---|---|---|---|---|---|
| Yassin El Bassiuony | Patton Utah | Individual jumping | 8 | 81.67 | 10 | 8 | 77.60 | 18 | 16 | 16 Q | 9 | 86.39 | 18 |

== Fencing ==
Egypt entered one female athlete.

| Athlete | Event | Group Stage | | | | | | Round of 16 | Quarterfinal | Semifinal | Final / BM | |
| Athlete | Event | Opposition Score | Opposition Score | Opposition Score | Opposition Score | Opposition Score | Rank | Opposition Score | Opposition Score | Opposition Score | Opposition Score | Rank |
|---|---|---|---|---|---|---|---|---|---|---|---|---|
| Sara Ismail | Women's foil | Leung (AUS); W 5–2 | Abu Obeid (JOR); W 5–0 | Zaimi (MAR); W 5–0 | Sow (SEN); W 5–1 | Mayerl (AUT); W 5–3 | 1 Q | —N/a | Raduzan (MAS); W 15–6 | Mayerl (AUT); W 15–11 | Belykh (RUS); L 8–15 | Silver medal |

== Judo ==
Egypt entered one male judoka based on the available quotas assigned by the International Judo Federation.

Men

| Athlete | Event | Round of 16 | Quarterfinals | Semifinals | Repechage 1 | Repechage 2 | Final / BM | |
| Athlete | Event | Opposition Result | Opposition Result | Opposition Result | Opposition Result | Opposition Result | Opposition Result | Rank |
|---|---|---|---|---|---|---|---|---|
| Aly Elramly | −81 kg | —N/a | Almaazmi (UAE); W 100–000 | Hakimi (IRI); L 001–110 | —N/a | | Charalampous (CYP); W 111–000 | Bronze medal |

== Sailing ==
Egypt entered one male athlete.

| Athlete | Event | Opening Series – Points per Race | | | | | | | | | | | | | | Total Points | Net Points | Final Rank |
| Athlete | Event | 1 | 2 | 3 | 4 | 5 | 6 | 7 | 8 | 9 | 10 | 11 | 12 | 13 | MR | Total Points | Net Points | Final Rank |
|---|---|---|---|---|---|---|---|---|---|---|---|---|---|---|---|---|---|---|
| Essam Siefeldin | Men's Techno 293+ | 4 | 6 | 13 | 8 | 15 | 9 | 11 | 12 | 16 | 14 | 13 | 8 | 12 | 11 | 152 | 107 | 11 |

== Swimming ==
Egypt entered one male swimmers.

| Athlete | Event | Heat | | Final | |
| Athlete | Event | Time | Rank | Time | Rank |
|---|---|---|---|---|---|
| Zain Hesham | 50 m butterlfy | 24.00 | 1 Q | 24.06 | Gold medal |
| Zain Hesham | 100 m butterlfy | 53.96 | 1 Q | 52.16 | Gold medal |
| Zain Hesham | 200 m butterlfy | 2:04.31 | 2 Q | 1:57.88 | Gold medal |

== Table tennis ==
Egypt entered two athletes (one male and one female).

| Athlete | Event | Group stage | | | | Round of 32 | Round of 16 | Quarterfinal | Semifinal | Final / BM | |
| Athlete | Event | Opposition Result | Opposition Result | Opposition Result | Rank | Opposition Result | Opposition Result | Opposition Result | Opposition Result | Opposition Result | Rank |
|---|---|---|---|---|---|---|---|---|---|---|---|
| Abdelmalk Elsayed | Men's singles | Faraji (IRI); L 0–3 | Villavicencio (ECU); W 3–0 | Preechayan (THA); W 3–1 | 2 Q | —N/a | Kawakami (JPN); L 0–4 | did not advance | | | =9 |
| Yara Elbadawy | Women's singles | Tung (HKG); L 0–3 | Ojo (NGR); W 3–1 | Kode (CZE); L 0–3 | 3 | did not advance | | | | | =17 |
| Abdelmalk Elsayed; Yara Elbadawy | Mixed doubles | —N/a | | | | Ferrer/Diallo (SEN); W 3–0 | Ho/Tung (HKG); L 1–3 | did not advance | | | =9 |

== Taekwondo ==
Egypt entered one male athlete.

Men

| Athlete | Event | Round of 16 | Quarterfinals | Semifinals | Repechage | Final / BM | |
| Athlete | Event | Opposition Result | Opposition Result | Opposition Result | Opposition Result | Opposition Result | Rank |
|---|---|---|---|---|---|---|---|
| Youssef Kamal | −48 kg | —N/a | Maradiaga (HON); W 34–7 | Balagula (MDA); W 28–8 | —N/a | Botta (FRA); W 8–7 | Gold medal |

== Triathlon ==
Egypt entered one female athlete.

| Athlete | Event | Time | | | | | | Rank |
| Athlete | Event | Swim (750m) | Trans 1 | Bike (20km) | Trans 2 | Run (5km) | Total | Rank |
|---|---|---|---|---|---|---|---|---|
| Joudy Fathy | Women's individual | 11:04 | 0.26 | 32:48 | 0.26 | 22:00 | 1:06.44 | 22 |

== Wushu ==
Egypt entered one female athlete after quotas were assigned by the International Wushu Federation.

| Athlete | Event | Preliminary round | | Final | |
| Athlete | Event | Points | Rank | Points | Rank |
|---|---|---|---|---|---|
| Sondos Sonbol | Women's changquan combined | 18.386 | 1 Q | 18.660 | Gold medal |
