= Gymnastics at the Summer Youth Olympics =

- Governing body: FIG
- Events: 17 (men: 8; women: 7; mixed: 2)

Games
- 2010; 2014; 2018; 2026

Gymnastics was inducted at the Youth Olympic Games at the inaugural edition in 2010. Since the first edition, three disciplines are contested: artistic gymnastics and trampoline gymnastics—both for boys and girls, and rhythmic gymnastics only for girls. In 2018, acrobatic gymnastics joined the programme, as well as an international team competition gathering gymnasts from all disciplines. In 2026, only artistic gymnastics was contested.

== Summary ==
Games	Year	Events	Best Nation
1	2010	16	Russia
2	2014	16	Russia
3	2018	17	Japan
4	2026	5	China

== Medal table ==
As of the 2026 Summer Youth Olympics.

Rank	Nation	Gold	Silver	Bronze	Total
1	Russia	16	5	7	28
2	China	13	7	7	27
3	Japan	7	6	4	17
4	Great Britain	4	6	7	17
5	Ukraine	3	5	4	12
6	Italy	3	3	4	10
7	Brazil	1	3	1	5
8	Romania	1	2	0	3
–	Mixed-NOCs	1	1	1	3
9	Bulgaria	1	1	0	2
10	United States	1	0	2	3
11	Cuba	1	0	0	1
11	Mongolia	1	0	0	1
11	New Zealand	1	0	0	1
14	Hungary	0	3	1	4
15	Belarus	0	3	0	3
16	Spain	0	2	2	4
17	Canada	0	1	2	3
18	Australia	0	1	1	2
18	France	0	1	1	2
18	Israel	0	1	1	2
21	Belgium	0	1	0	1
21	Egypt	0	1	0	1
21	Turkey	0	1	0	1
24	Austria	0	0	1	1
24	Germany	0	0	1	1
24	Iran	0	0	1	1
24	Kazakhstan	0	0	1	1
24	Norway	0	0	1	1
24	Portugal	0	0	1	1
24	South Korea	0	0	1	1
24	Sweden	0	0	1	1
24	Uzbekistan	0	0	1	1
Totals (32 entries)		54	54	54	162

== Medals ==
=== Acrobatic gymnastics ===
==== Mixed pairs ====
Games	Gold	Silver	Bronze
2018 Buenos Aires	Mariela Kostadinova; Bulgaria; Panayot Dimitrov; Bulgaria	Noa Yakar; Israel; Yonatan Fridman; Israel	Daryna Plokhotniuk; Ukraine; Oleksandr Madei; Ukraine

=== Artistic gymnastics ===
==== Boys' events ====
===== Team =====
Games	Gold	Silver	Bronze
2026 Dakar	China; Li Lezheng; Yang Lanbin; Zhao Ruiyang	Japan; Hiroto Fujimoto; Ikki Nishihara; Naoto Shiroiwa	Great Britain; Uzair Chowdhury; Benjamin Porter; Lucas Scully

===== All-around =====
Games	Gold	Silver	Bronze
2010 Singapore	Yuya Kamoto; Japan	Oleg Stepko; Ukraine	Zhu Xiaodong; China
2014 Nanjing	Giarnni Regini-Moran; Great Britain	Nikita Nagornyy; Russia	Alec Yoder; United States
2018 Buenos Aires	Takeru Kitazono; Japan	Sergei Naidin; Russia	Diogo Soares; Brazil
2026 Dakar	Daniil Smirnov; Russia	Uzair Chowdhury; Great Britain	Ikki Nishihara; Japan

===== Floor exercise =====
Games	Gold	Silver	Bronze
2010 Singapore	Ernesto Vila Sarria; Cuba	Oleg Stepko; Ukraine	Zhu Xiaodong; China
2014 Nanjing	Giarnni Regini-Moran; Great Britain	Kenya Yuasa; Japan	Lim Myong-woo; South Korea
2018 Buenos Aires	Takeru Kitazono; Japan	Krisztián Balázs; Hungary	Sergei Naidin; Russia

===== Pommel horse =====
Games	Gold	Silver	Bronze
2010 Singapore	Oleg Stepko; Ukraine	Sam Oldham; Great Britain	Daniil Kazachkov; Russia
2014 Nanjing	Nikita Nagornyy; Russia	Vladyslav Hryko; Ukraine	Timur Kadirov; Uzbekistan
2018 Buenos Aires	Yin Dehang; China	Sergei Naidin; Russia	Reza Bohloulzadeh; Iran

===== Rings =====
Games	Gold	Silver	Bronze
2010 Singapore	Andrei Muntean; Romania	Yuya Kamoto; Japan	Néstor Abad; Spain
2014 Nanjing	Nikita Nagornyy; Russia	Ma Yue; China	Vladyslav Hryko; Ukraine
2018 Buenos Aires	Takeru Kitazono; Japan	Félix Dolci; Canada	Yin Dehang; China

===== Vault =====
Games	Gold	Silver	Bronze
2010 Singapore	Ganbatyn Erdenebold; Mongolia	Ferhat Arıcan; Turkey	Néstor Abad; Spain
2014 Nanjing	Giarnni Regini-Moran; Great Britain	Ma Yue; China	Nikita Nagornyy; Russia
2018 Buenos Aires	Brandon Briones; United States	Nazar Chepurnyi; Ukraine	Jacob Karlsen; Norway

===== Parallel bars =====
Games	Gold	Silver	Bronze
2010 Singapore	Oleg Stepko; Ukraine	Andrei Muntean; Romania	Ludovico Edalli; Italy
2014 Nanjing	Nikita Nagornyy; Russia	Botond Kardos; Hungary	Giarnni Regini-Moran; Great Britain
2018 Buenos Aires	Takeru Kitazono; Japan	Yin Dehang; China	Sergei Naidin; Russia

===== Horizontal bar =====
Games	Gold	Silver	Bronze
2010 Singapore	Sam Oldham; Great Britain	Néstor Abad; Spain	Zhu Xiaodong; China
2014 Nanjing	Kenya Yuasa; Japan	Luka van den Keybus; Belgium	Giarnni Regini-Moran; Great Britain
2018 Buenos Aires	Takeru Kitazono; Japan	Diogo Soares; Brazil	Krisztián Balázs; Hungary

==== Girls' events ====
===== Team =====
Games	Gold	Silver	Bronze
2026 Dakar	China; Chen Ziyan; Xie Guying; Zhong Qi	Japan; Yume Minamino; Kanon Nakashima; Nanami Togo	France; Caly Chayani; Lilou Marliac; Louane Plisson

===== All-around =====
Games	Gold	Silver	Bronze
2010 Singapore	Viktoria Komova; Russia	Tan Sixin; China	Carlotta Ferlito; Italy
2014 Nanjing	Seda Tutkhalyan; Russia	Flávia Saraiva; Brazil	Ellie Downie; Great Britain
2018 Buenos Aires	Giorgia Villa; Italy	Amelie Morgan; Great Britain	Anastasiia Bachynska; Ukraine
2026 Dakar	Polina Dmitrieva; Russia	Louane Plisson; France	Zhong Qi; China

===== Vault =====
Games	Gold	Silver	Bronze
2010 Singapore	Viktoria Komova; Russia	Maria Vargas; Spain	Carlotta Ferlito; Italy
2014 Nanjing	Wang Yan; China	Ellie Downie; Great Britain	Sae Miyakawa; Japan
2018 Buenos Aires	Giorgia Villa; Italy	Csenge Bacskay; Hungary	Emma Spence; Canada

===== Uneven bars =====
Games	Gold	Silver	Bronze
2010 Singapore	Viktoria Komova; Russia	Tan Sixin; China	Jonna Adlerteg; Sweden
2014 Nanjing	Seda Tutkhalyan; Russia	Iosra Abdelaziz; Italy	Wang Yan; China
2018 Buenos Aires	Kseniia Klimenko; Russia	Giorgia Villa; Italy	Tang Xijing; China

===== Balance beam =====
Games	Gold	Silver	Bronze
2010 Singapore	Tan Sixin; China	Carlotta Ferlito; Italy	Angela Donald; Australia
2014 Nanjing	Wang Yan; China	Flávia Saraiva; Brazil	Ellie Downie; Great Britain
2018 Buenos Aires	Tang Xijing; China	Kseniia Klimenko; Russia	Amelie Morgan; Great Britain

===== Floor exercise =====
Games	Gold	Silver	Bronze
2010 Singapore	Tan Sixin; China	Diana Bulimar; Romania	Viktoria Komova; Russia
2014 Nanjing	Flávia Saraiva; Brazil	Seda Tutkhalyan; Russia	Ellie Downie; Great Britain
2018 Buenos Aires	Giorgia Villa; Italy	Amelie Morgan; Great Britain	Anastasiia Bachynska; Ukraine

==== Mixed ====
===== Mixed team =====
Games	Gold	Silver	Bronze
2026 Dakar	China; Chen Ziyan; Yang Lanbin	Japan; Yume Minamino; Ikki Nishihara	Israel; Ophir Shmuely; Tomer Tirosh

=== Multi-discipline ===
==== Mixed team ====
Games	Gold	Silver	Bronze
2018 Buenos Aires	Team Simone Biles; Mariela Kostadinova (BUL); Panayot Dimitrov (BUL); Ruan Lange (RSA); Krisztián Balázs (HUN); Nazar Chepurnyi (UKR); Tamara Anika Ong (SGP); Pham Nhu Phuong (VIE); Alba Petisco (ESP); Talisa Torretti (ITA); Daria Trubnikova (RUS); Yelizaveta Luzan (AZE); Liam Christie (AUS); Fan Xinyi (CHN)	Team Max Whitlock; Madalena Cavilhas (POR); Manuel Candeias (POR); Fernando Espindola (ARG); Takeru Kitazono (JPN); Pablo Calvache (ECU); Camila Montoya (CRC); Kseniia Klimenko (RUS); Zeina Ibrahim (EGY); Rayna Khai Ling Hoh (MAS); Roza Abitova (KAZ); Adelina Beljajeva (EST); Robert Vilarasau (ESP); Jessica Clarke (GBR)	Team Oksana Chusovitina; Viktoryia Akhotnikava (BLR); Ilya Famenkou (BLR); Brandon Briones (USA); Adam Tobin (GBR); Mohamed Afify (EGY); Indira Ulmasova (UZB); Karla Perez (GUA); Tonya Paulsson (SWE); Lidiia Iakovleva (AUS); Aino Yamada (JPN); Lilly Rotaermel (GER); Santiago Escallier (ARG); Antonia Sakellaridou (GRE)

=== Rhythmic gymnastics ===
==== Individual all-around ====
Games	Gold	Silver	Bronze
2010 Singapore	Alexandra Merkulova; Russia	Arina Charopa; Belarus	Jana Berezko-Marggrander; Germany
2014 Nanjing	Irina Annenkova; Russia	Mariya Trubach; Belarus	Laura Zeng; United States
2018 Buenos Aires	Daria Trubnikova; Russia	Khrystyna Pohranychna; Ukraine	Talisa Torretti; Italy

==== Group all-around ====
Games	Gold	Silver	Bronze
2010 Singapore	Russia; Ksenia Dudkina; Alina Makarenko; Karolina Sevastyanova; Olga Ilina	Egypt; Farida Sherif Eid; Jacinthe Tarek Eldeeb; Manar Khaled Mohamed Elgarf; Aicha Mohamed Tarek Niazi	Canada; Katrina Cameron; Melodie Omidi; Anjelika Reznik; Victoria Reznik
2014 Nanjing	Russia; Daria Anenkova; Daria Dubova; Victoria Ilina; Natalia Safonova; Sofya Skomorokh	Bulgaria; Elena Bineva; Aleksandra Mitrovich; Emiliya Radicheva; Sofiya Rangelova; Gabriela Stefanova	Kazakhstan; Viktoriya Guslyakova; Amina Kozhakhat; Nuray Kumarova; Darya Medvedeva; Aliya Moldakhmetova

=== Trampoline gymnastics ===
==== Boys' individual ====
Games	Gold	Silver	Bronze
2010 Singapore	Oleksandr Satin; Ukraine	He Yuxiang; China	Ginga Munetomo; Japan
2014 Nanjing	Dylan Schmidt; New Zealand	Liu Changxin; China	Pedro Ferreira; Portugal
2018 Buenos Aires	Fu Fantao; China	Andrew Stamp; Great Britain	Benny Wizani; Austria

==== Girls' individual ====
Games	Gold	Silver	Bronze
2010 Singapore	Dong Yu; China	Sviatlana Makshtrova; Belarus	Chisato Doihata; Japan
2014 Nanjing	Zhu Xueying; China	Rana Nakano; Japan	Maria Zakharchuk; Russia
2018 Buenos Aires	Fan Xinyi; China	Jessica Pickering; Australia	Vera Beliankina; Russia

== See also ==
- Gymnastics at the Summer Olympics
