= Archery at the 2026 Summer Youth Olympics – Mixed team =

Archery event at the 2026 Summer Youth Olympics

Mixed team at the IV Summer Youth Olympic Games
- Venue: Abdoulaye Wade Stadium
- Dates: 10 November
- Competitors: 32 from 16 nations

Medalists
1st place, gold medalist(s)		Aarya Arun; Ye-eun Whang	United States
2nd place, silver medalist(s)		Maёl Lamouret; Aurane Lapouge	France
3rd place, bronze medalist(s)		Lee Ji-ho; Kim Su-min	South Korea

The mixed team archery competition at the 2026 Summer Youth Olympics will be held from 10 November 2026 at the Abdoulaye Wade Stadium in Dakar, Senegal. The ranking round took place on 6 November in each gender, points are added to decide the seeds of the elimination stage.

== Results ==
=== Ranking round ===
The ranking round was held on 6 November 2026. Top 16 teams are qualified to the elimination stage.

Rank	Nation	10s	Xs	Score	Qualified
1	South Korea	80	28	1371	Q
	Lee Ji-ho	36	10	683	
	Kim Su-min	44	18	688	
2	Turkey	76	34	1361	Q
	Muhammet Musab Gülay	33	10	673	
	Dünya Yenihayat	43	24	688	
3	France	79	25	1358	Q
	Maёl Lamouret	44	11	687	
	Aurane Lapouge	35	14	671	
4	United States	63	21	1337	Q
	Aarya Arun	31	12	666	
	Ye-eun Whang	32	9	671	
5	Australia	62	23	1334	Q
	Brock Penna	33	15	673	
	Ellen Martini	29	8	661	
6	Egypt	63	18	1326	Q
	Ismail Ezzeldin	44	11	688	
	Nouray Elsayed	19	7	638	
7	Germany	58	14	1325	Q
	Johann Conrad	33	7	668	
	Merle Edlic	25	7	657	
8	Spain	55	16	1324	Q
	Rodrigo Palomo	23	5	651	
	Sandra Pérez	32	11	673	
9	Mexico	48	18	1313	Q
	Diego Góngora	27	12	661	
	Maya Casas	21	6	652	
10	Japan	53	17	1313	Q
	Takara Daimon	28	8	666	
	Yuika Kamiyanagi	25	9	647	
11	United Arab Emirates	55	14	1308	Q
	Khalifa Musabeh Alkaabi	36	8	677	
	Huda Saleh Alali	19	6	631	
12	Switzerland	49	13	1298	Q
	Noé Wenger	34	10	675	
	Alexandra Rossier	15	3	623	
13	Slovakia	41	9	1298	Q
	Oliver Sotak	24	6	653	
	Adela Tollarovičová	17	3	645	
14	Slovenia	48	23	1289	Q
	Samo Vrbec	37	20	685	
	Teja Vidmar	11	3	604	
15	Italy	45	17	1283	Q
	Niccolo Mazzuoli	22	8	633	
	Matilde Manini	23	9	650	
16	Israel	46	15	1271	Q
	Yuval Raz	26	8	653	
	Nicole Golovanevski	20	7	618	
17	Colombia	36	5	1263	
	Nicolás Gómez Meneses	18	4	641	
	Juana Cardona	18	1	622	
18	Great Britain	41	19	1258	
	Archie Christopher	24	11	639	
	Jasmine Harris	17	8	619	
19	New Zealand	31	14	1241	
	Thornton Wallberg	22	11	635	
	Ella Yang	9	3	606	
20	South Africa	18	4	1237	
	Benjamin Oosthuizen	7	1	613	
	Layla Viljoen	11	3	624	
21	Canada	25	11	1236	
	Yashveer Bains	16	7	627	
	Alison Langley	9	4	609	
22	Tunisia	41	16	1232	
	Mohamed Hedi Benhamed	19	6	605	
	Ritej Chaieb	22	10	627	
23	Ivory Coast	18	4	1172	
	Kouassi Chadrac Yao	11	3	603	
	Sita Sore	7	1	569	
24	Guinea	12	2	1243	
	Mory Konaté	6	1	577	
	Fatoumata Koulako Bah	6	1	566	
25	Algeria	14	3	1134	
	Marouane Guendouzi	2	0	558	
	Selma Malak	12	3	576	

=== Elimination rounds ===
Round of 16
1	South Korea	6	37	37	38	37
16	Israel	2	36	38	37	36
9	Mexico	4	38	35	37	36
8	Spain	5	34	39	36	38
5	Australia	5	32	38	35	36
12	Switzerland	3	33	36	35	35
13	Slovakia	3	35	39	38	38
4	United States	5	37	37	37	38
3	France	6	38	38	38
14	Slovenia	0	35	31	29
11	United Arab Emirates	5	38	36	36	35
6	Egypt	4	32	34	38	40
7	Germany	1	37	35	35
10	Japan	5	38	35	37
15	Italy	1	38	35	35
2	Turkey	5	38	38	40

Quarter-finals
1	South Korea	6	39	37	38	39
8	Spain	2	34	36	39	37
5	Australia	3	37	37	36	36
4	United States	5	37	37	38	36
3	France	5	35	38	37	39
11	United Arab Emirates	4	36	27	37	39
10	Japan	3	38	37	37	38
2	Turkey	5	37	38	37	39

Semi-finals
1	South Korea	4	38	39	39	38
4	United States	5	38	40	37	38
3	France	6	39	36	38	39
2	Turkey	2	38	37	37	38

Gold medal match
4	United States	5	38	38	38
3	France	1	37	36	38
Bronze medal match
1	South Korea	6	40	40	39
2	Turkey	0	38	39	38

=== Final ranking ===
Rank	NOC	Female athlete	Male athlete
1st place, gold medalist(s)	United States	Yeeun Whang	Aarya Arun
2nd place, silver medalist(s)	France	Aurane Lapouge	Mael Lamouret
3rd place, bronze medalist(s)	South Korea	Sumin Kim	Jiho Lee
4	Turkey	Dunya Yenihayat	Muhammet Musab Gulay
5	Japan	Yuika Kamiyanagi	Takara Daimon
6	Australia	Ellen Martini	Brock Penna
6	Spain	Sandra Perez Cumbreras	Rodrigo Palomo Sanchez
8	United Arab Emirates	Huda Saleh Alali	Khalifa Musabeh Alkaabi
9	Slovakia	Adela Tollarovicova	Oliver Sotak
10	Israel	Nicole Golovanevski	Yuval Raz
11	Mexico	Maya Casas Lara	Diego Fernando Gongora Trujillo
12	Egypt	Nouray Elsayed	Ismail Ezzeldin
13	Italy	Matilde Manini	Niccolo Mazzuoli
14	Germany	Merle Edlich	Johann Conrad
15	Switzerland	Alexandra Rossier	Noe Wenger
16	Slovenia	Teja Vidmar	Samo Vrbec
17	Colombia	Juana Cardona Gaviria	Nicolas Gomez Meneses
18	Great Britain	Jasmine Harris	Archie Christopher
19	New Zealand	Ella Yang	Thornton Wallberg
20	South Africa	Layla Viljoen	Benjamin Oosthuizen
21	Canada	Alison Langley	Yashveer Bains
22	Tunisia	Ritej Chaieb	Mohamed Hedi Benhamed
23	Ivory Coast	Sita Sore	Kouassi Chadrac Yao
24	Guinea	Fatoumata Koulako Bah	Mory Konate
25	Algeria	Selma Malak Bedreddine	Marouane Guendouzi
