= Athletics at the 2026 Summer Youth Olympics – Men's 5000 metres walk =

Men's 5000 metres race walk athletics event at the 2026 Summer Youth Olympics

Men's 5000 metres race walk at the IV Summer Youth Olympic Games
- Venue: Complexe Iba Mar Diop
- Date: 10 November
- Competitors: 10 from 10 nations
- Winning time: 20:41.36

Medalists
1st place, gold medalist(s)		Gabriel González	Spain
2nd place, silver medalist(s)		Vitalii Tarasiuk	Ukraine
3rd place, bronze medalist(s)		Futo Abe	Japan

The men's 5000 metres race walk event at the 2026 Summer Youth Olympics was held on 10 November at the Complexe Iba Mar Diop in Dakar, Senegal. Spain's Gabriel González won the gold medal in 20:41.36.

== Schedule ==
All times are local (UTC±0).

Date	Time	Round
10 November 2026	16:01	Final

== Results ==
=== Final ===
The final was held at 16:01. Two athletes were disqualified for receiving a fourth red card under technical rule TR54.7.5.

Rank	Athlete	Nation	Result	Remark
1st place, gold medalist(s)	Gabriel González	Spain	20:41.36	
2nd place, silver medalist(s)	Vitalii Tarasiuk	Ukraine	20:55.54	
3rd place, bronze medalist(s)	Futo Abe	Japan	21:09.22	
4	Matteo Henault	France	21:17.26	
5	Davide Sorressa	Italy	21:41.09	30s penalty
6	Tobias Josué Hun Nuñez	Guatemala	21:57.32	PB
7	Jhamil Avendano	Bolivia	22:27.58	PB
8	Patrik Pivarski	Croatia	22:29.00	
—	Mohamed Amin Mejri	Tunisia	DQ	TR54.7.5
—	Youssef Mohamed	Egypt	DQ	TR54.7.5
