= Artistic gymnastics at the 2026 Summer Youth Olympics =

Gymnastics at the IV Summer Youth Olympic Games
- Venue: Dakar Expo Center
- Dates: 7–11 November
- No. of events: 5 (2 boys, 2 girls, 1 mixed)
- Competitors: 120 (60 boys, 60 girls) from 41 nations

Artistic gymnastics at the 2026 Summer Youth Olympics was held from 7 to 11 November at the Dakar Expo Center in Dakar, Senegal.

== Qualification ==
There were 60 quota places available per gender, 24 for the individual all-around and 12 for the team all-around. Per gender, a National Olympic Committee could either apply for a single spot in the individual all-around or a spot for the mixed team all-around, where three athletes compete.

To be eligible to compete in the games the athletes had to fulfill the following requirements:

- Boys had to be born between 14 November 2008 and 31 October 2010
- Girls had to be born between 14 November 2008 and 31 October 2012
- All athletes had to have a valid FIG Licence
- All athletes had to at least participated in one Junior event organized by World Gymnastics in either 2025 or 2026.

The quota places are distributed among the individual continental confederations as follows:

Federation	Boys		Girls	
Federation	Individual	Team	Individual	Team
AGU	4	2	4	2
OGU	1	1	1	1
PAGU	4	2	5	2
UAG	5	2	5	2
UEG	10	5	9	5

=== Qualification summary ===
The detailed allocation of the quota places was announced in June 2026.

Federation	Boys		Girls	
Federation	Individual	Team	Individual	Team
UAG	Algeria	Egypt	Algeria	Egypt
UAG	Cameroon	South Africa	Cameroon	South Africa
UAG	Morocco	—N/a	Morocco	—N/a
UAG	Senegal	—N/a	Senegal	—N/a
UAG	Tunisia	—N/a	Tunisia	—N/a
AGU	Kazakhstan	Japan	Kazakhstan	Japan
AGU	Philippines	China	Philippines	China
AGU	South Korea	—N/a	Singapore	—N/a
AGU	Uzbekistan	—N/a	Uzbekistan	—N/a
OGU	New Zealand	Australia	New Zealand	Australia
PAGU	Argentina	Colombia	Bolivia	Canada
PAGU	Brazil	Mexico	Brazil	Mexico
PAGU	Canada	—N/a	Guatemala	—N/a
PAGU	Ecuador	—N/a	Jamaica	—N/a
PAGU	—N/a	—N/a	Panama	—N/a
UEG	Austria	Belgium	Austria	Czech Republic
UEG	Bulgaria	Germany	Belgium	France
UEG	Hungary	France	Germany	Great Britain
UEG	Russia (Note: At the time the quota places were allocated, Russia was subject to IOC sanctions; consequently, the places were awarded to Individual Neutral Athletes. However, it was determined that Russia would be allowed to compete under their name and flag at this competition.)	Great Britain	Hungary	Italy
UEG	Israel	Italy	Russia	Romania
UEG	Poland	—N/a	Israel	—N/a
UEG	Spain	—N/a	Malta	—N/a
UEG	Switzerland	—N/a	Spain	—N/a
UEG	Turkey	—N/a	Ukraine	—N/a
UEG	Ukraine	—N/a	—N/a	—N/a

== Schedule ==
Q	Qualification	F	Final

Event ↓/Date →	Sat 7	Sun 8	Mon 9	Tue 10	Wed 11
Men's team	Q		F		
Men's all-around	Q			F	
Women's team		Q	F		
Women's all-around		Q		F	
Mixed team	Q				F

== Medalists ==
=== Men's events ===
Games	Gold	Silver	Bronze
Team	China; Li Lezheng; Yang Lanbin; Zhao Ruiyang	Japan; Hiroto Fujimoto; Ikki Nishihara; Naoto Shiroiwa	Great Britain; Uzair Chowdhury; Benjamin Porter; Lucas Scully
All-around	Daniil Smirnov; Russia	Uzair Chowdhury; Great Britain	Ikki Nishihara; Japan

=== Women's events ===
Games	Gold	Silver	Bronze
Team	China; Chen Ziyan; Xie Guying; Zhong Qi	Japan; Yume Minamino; Kanon Nakashima; Nanami Togo	France; Caly Chayani; Lilou Marliac; Louane Plisson
All-around	Polina Dmitrieva; Russia	Louane Plisson; France	Zhong Qi; China

=== Mixed events ===
Games	Gold	Silver	Bronze
Mixed team	China; Yang Lanbin; Chen Ziyan	Japan; Ikki Nishihara; Yume Minamino	Israel; Tomer Tirosh; Ophir Shmuely

=== Medal table ===
* Host nation (Senegal)

Rank	Nation	Gold	Silver	Bronze	Total
1	China	3	0	1	4
2	Russia	2	0	0	2
3	Japan	0	3	1	4
4	France	0	1	1	2
4	Great Britain	0	1	1	2
6	Israel	0	0	1	1
Totals (6 entries)		5	5	5	15
