= Russia at the 2026 Summer Youth Olympics =

- Flag of Russia
- IOC code: RUS
- NOC: Russian Olympic Committee

in Dakar, Senegal 31 October 2026 – 13 November 2026
- Competitors: 13 (6 men and 7 women) in 8 sports
- Flag bearers: Bogdan Toropkin & Serafima Fokina
- Medals Ranked 3rd: Gold 8 Silver 4 Bronze 2 Total 14

Summer Youth Olympics appearances (overview)
- 2010; 2014; 2018; 2026

Russia competed at the 2026 Summer Youth Olympics in Dakar, Senegal from 31 October to 13 November 2026. This marked the first appearance of Russia as a nation since the 2020 Winter Youth Olympics.

== Competitors ==
The following is the list of number of competitors participating at the Games per sport/discipline.

Sport	Boys	Girls	Total
Artistic gymnastics	1	1	2
Equestrian	1	0	1
Fencing	0	1	1
Judo	0	1	1
Road cycling	1	1	2
Skateboarding	0	1	1
Swimming	1	1	2
Taekwondo	1	1	2
Wushu	1	0	1
Total	6	7	13

== Medalists ==
Medal	Name	Sport	Event	Date
Gold	Serafima Fokina	Swimming	Women's 100 m butterfly	1 November
Gold	Bogdan Toropkin	Swimming	Men's 100 m freestyle	2 November
Gold	Serafima Fokina	Swimming	Women's 50 m butterfly	4 November
Gold	Bogdan Toropkin	Swimming	Men's 200 m freestyle	6 November
Gold	Angelina Novolodskaya	Road cycling	Women's individual road race	8 November
Gold	Uliana Belykh	Fencing	Women's foil	8 November
Gold	Daniil Smirnov	Artistic gymnastics	Men's all-around	10 November
Gold	Polina Dmitrieva	Artistic gymnastics	Women's all-around	10 November
Silver	Bogdan Toropkin	Swimming	Men's 400 m freestyle	3 November
Silver	Anastasiia Dobrovolskaia	Judo	Women's 78 kg	3 November
Silver	Stepan Bortnik	Road cycling	Men's individual road race	8 November
Silver	Elina Tkhamokova	Taekwondo	Women's 44 kg	8 November
Bronze	Angelina Novolodskaya	Road cycling	Women's road time trial	10 November
Bronze	Bashir Adzhiev	Taekwondo	Men's +73 kg	11 November

Medals by sport
Sport	1st place, gold medalist(s)	2nd place, silver medalist(s)	3rd place, bronze medalist(s)	Total
Swimming	4	1	0	5
Artistic gymnastics	2	0	0	2
Road cycling	1	1	1	3
Fencing	1	0	0	1
Taekwondo	0	1	1	2
Judo	0	1	0	1
Total	8	4	2	14

Medals by date
Day	Date	1st place, gold medalist(s)	2nd place, silver medalist(s)	3rd place, bronze medalist(s)	Total
Day 1	1 November	1	0	0	1
Day 2	2 November	1	0	0	1
Day 3	3 November	0	2	0	2
Day 4	4 November	1	0	0	1
Day 5	5 November	0	0	0	0
Day 6	6 November	1	0	0	1
Day 7	7 November	0	0	0	0
Day 8	8 November	2	2	0	4
Day 9	9 November	0	0	0	0
Day 10	10 November	2	0	1	3
Day 11	11 November	0	0	1	1
Day 12	12 November	0	0	0	0
Day 13	13 November	0	0	0	0
Total		8	4	2	14

== Artistic gymnastics ==
Russia entered two artistic gymnasts, one man and one women.

Boys

Athlete	Event	Qualification								Final							
Athlete	Event	Apparatus						Total	Rank	Apparatus						Total	Rank
Athlete	Event	F	PH	R	V	PB	HB	Total	Rank	F	PH	R	V	PB	HB	Total	Rank
Daniil Smirnov	All-around	12.733	13.533	12.366	14.033	13.733	10.366	76.764	6 Q	13.600	13.966	12.666	13.866	14.000	13.200	81.298	1st place, gold medalist(s)

Girls

Athlete	Event	Qualification						Final					
Athlete	Event	Apparatus				Total	Rank	Apparatus				Total	Rank
Athlete	Event	V	UB	BB	F	Total	Rank	V	UB	BB	F	Total	Rank
Polina Dmitrieva	All-around	13.100	14.000	12.733	12.900	52.733	3 Q	13.066	14.500	14.133	12.966	54.665	1st place, gold medalist(s)

Mixed

Athlete	Event	Qualification		Final					
Athlete	Event	Total	Rank	Round 1		Round 2		Round 3	
Athlete	Event	Total	Rank	Total	Rank	Total	Rank	Total	Rank
Daniil Smirnov; Polina Dmitrieva	Mixed team	76.465	4 Q	24.499	12	Did not advance			

== Equestrian ==
Mixed

Athlete	Horse	Event	Qualification						Final	
Athlete	Horse	Event	Round A		Round B		Total		Final	
Athlete	Horse	Event	Penalties	Rank	Penalties	Rank	Penalties	Rank	Penalties	Rank
Iaroslav Pushkin	Jistra	Individual jumping	19	=19	12	23	31	21 Q	12	20

== Fencing ==
Athlete	Event	Pool round		Round of 16	Quarterfinals	Semifinals	Final / BM	
Athlete	Event	Opposition Score	Seed	Opposition Score	Opposition Score	Opposition Score	Opposition Score	Rank
Uliana Belykh	Women's foil	Mohd Radzuan (MAS) W 5–3; Tym (POL) L 3–4; Dubolari (MDA) W 5–0; Wang (NZL) W 5–0; Araoud (BHR) W 5–2	2	Bye	Leung (AUS); W 15–6	Tym (POL); W 15–3	Amr Hossny (EGY); W 15–8	1st place, gold medalist(s)

== Judo ==
Russia entered one female judoka based on the available quotas assigned by the International Judo Federation.

Athlete	Event	Round of 16	Quarterfinals	Semifinals	Repechage 1	Repechage 2	Final / BM	
Athlete	Event	Opposition Result	Opposition Result	Opposition Result	Opposition Result	Opposition Result	Opposition Result	Rank
Anastasiia Dobrovolskaia	Women's –78 kg	Nherera (ZIM); W 100–000	Chávez (MEX); W 102–000	Wögerer (AUT); W 100–000	—N/a		Vallim (BRA); L 000–110	2nd place, silver medalist(s)

== Road cycling ==
Russia entered two cyclist, one man and one women.

Athlete	Event	Time	Rank
Stepan Bortnik	Men's road race	1:47:04	2nd place, silver medalist(s)
Stepan Bortnik	Men's road time trial	10:35.16	7
Angelina Novolodskaya	Women's road race	1:31:19	1st place, gold medalist(s)
Angelina Novolodskaya	Women's road time trial	11:43.65	3rd place, bronze medalist(s)

== Skateboarding ==
Russia entered one female athlete based on available quotas.

Athlete	Event	Prelims		Final	
Athlete	Event	Points	Rank	Points	Rank
Mariia Ozhigova	Women's street	108.58	6 Q	116.42	4

== Swimming ==
Boys

Athlete	Event	Heats		Final	
Athlete	Event	Time	Rank	Time	Rank
Bogdan Toropkin	100 m freestyle	50.61	2 Q	49.66	1st place, gold medalist(s)
Bogdan Toropkin	200 m freestyle	1:50.94	1 Q	1:47.78	1st place, gold medalist(s)
Bogdan Toropkin	400 m freestyle	—N/a		3:50.46	2nd place, silver medalist(s)

Girls

Athlete	Event	Heats		Final	
Athlete	Event	Time	Rank	Time	Rank
Serafima Fokina	100 m freestyle	58.82	10	Did not advance	
Serafima Fokina	50 m butterfly	27.21	1 Q	27.28	1st place, gold medalist(s)
Serafima Fokina	100 m butterfly	1:00.19	1 Q	59.81	1st place, gold medalist(s)
Serafima Fokina	200 m butterfly	—N/a		2:17.83	4

== Taekwondo ==
Athlete	Event	Round of 16	Quarterfinals	Semifinals	Final	
Athlete	Event	Opposition Result	Opposition Result	Opposition Result	Opposition Result	Rank
Bashir Adzhiev	Men's +73 kg	Bye	Živković (BIH); W 2–0	Lysenko (ESP); L 1–2	Did not advance	3rd place, bronze medalist(s)
Elina Tkhamokova	Women's 44 kg	Bye	Isayeva (AZE); W 2–0	Lai (TPE); W 2–0	Uglešić (CRO); L 0–2	2nd place, silver medalist(s)

== Wushu ==
Athlete	Event	Preliminary round				Final			
Athlete	Event	Changquan	Gunshu	Total	Rank	Changquan	Gunshu	Total	Rank
Artem Bliushke	Men's changquan combined	9.080	9.046	18.126	6 Q	9.196	9.023	18.219	6
