= Breaking at the 2026 Summer Youth Olympics – B-Girls =

Breaking event at the 2026 Summer Youth Olympics

B-Girls at the IV Summer Youth Olympic Games
- Venue: Complexe Tour de l'Œuf
- Dates: 12–13 November 2026
- Competitors: 12 from 12 nations

Medalists
1st place, gold medalist(s)		Hiyo Yamada	Japan
2nd place, silver medalist(s)		Nikol Dzhuryk	Ukraine
3rd place, bronze medalist(s)		Alicia Babarro	Spain

The B-Girls breaking event at the 2026 Summer Youth Olympics was held at the Complexe Tour de l'Œuf in Dakar, Senegal, on 12 and 13 November 2026. Twelve athletes from twelve nations competed in the event.

== Schedule ==
All times are local time (UTC+0).

Date	Time	Event
12 November 2026	11:00	Pre-selection
12 November 2026	11:31–13:03	Round robin
13 November 2026	11:00	Quarter-finals
13 November 2026	11:59	Semi-finals
13 November 2026	12:31	Bronze medal battle
13 November 2026	12:49	Gold medal battle

== Competition format ==
The competition began with a pre-selection in which all twelve athletes performed individually and received scores from the judges. The results determined the seeding for the round-robin stage.

The athletes were divided into three groups of four. Each athlete competed against the other three athletes in their group. Each round-robin battle consisted of two rounds.

The top two athletes from each group and the two best third-placed athletes advanced to the quarter-finals. The remaining athletes were ranked ninth to twelfth.

The knockout stage consisted of quarter-finals, semi-finals, a bronze medal battle and a gold medal battle.

== Results ==
=== Pre-selection ===
Pre-selection results
Rank	Breaker	Nickname	Nation	Score
1	Hiyo Yamada	Hiyo	Japan	80.1
2	Nikol Dzhuryk	Nikastar	Ukraine	77.8
3	Alicia Babarro	Mini Ali	Spain	77.7
4	Melina Fernández	Melkez	Germany	74.8
5	Aya Kraeva	A2K	Bulgaria	71.0
6	Tia Clarissa	Reese	Malaysia	70.6
7	Lolita Dauphin	Queen Lolita	France	69.5
8	Keira Barth	Krazy	United States	69.4
9	Nawel Ennadre	Nawel	Morocco	68.3
10	Song Min-ji	Minji	South Korea	65.7
11	Aizara Zhumabekova	Aizara	Kazakhstan	64.7
12	Suzanne Toure	Suzz	Senegal	44.0

=== Round robin ===
==== Group A ====
Group A standings
Rank	Breaker (seed)	Nickname	Rounds	Votes	Qualified
1	Hiyo Yamada (JPN) (1)	Hiyo	6	54	Q
2	Lolita Dauphin (FRA) (7)	Queen Lolita	4	29	Q
3	Tia Clarissa (MAS) (6)	Reese	2	22	Q
4	Suzanne Toure (SEN) (12)	Suzz	0	3	

Match	Red Side	Score	Blue Side	Round 1	Round 2	Total Votes	Report
1	Hiyo (Japan)	2–0	(Malaysia) Reese	9–0	9–0	18–0	Report
2	Suzz (Senegal)	0–2	(France) Queen Lolita	1–8	1–8	2–16	Report
3	Hiyo (Japan)	2–0	(France) Queen Lolita	9–0	9–0	18–0	Report
4	Reese (Malaysia)	2–0	(Senegal) Suzz	8–1	9–0	17–1	Report
5	DNS Suzz (Senegal)	0–2	(Japan) Hiyo	0–9	0–9	0–18	Report
6	Queen Lolita (France)	2–0	(Malaysia) Reese	8–1	5–4	13–5	Report

==== Group B ====
Group B standings
Rank	Breaker (seed)	Nickname	Rounds	Votes	Qualified
1	Nikol Dzhuryk (UKR) (2)	Nikastar	6	48	Q
2	Aizara Zhumabekova (KAZ) (11)	Aizara	3	20	Q
3	Keira Barth (USA) (8)	Krazy	2	21	
4	Aya Kraeva (BUL) (5)	A2K	1	19	

Match	Red Side	Score	Blue Side	Round 1	Round 2	Total Votes	Report
1	Nikastar (Ukraine)	2–0	(Bulgaria) A2K	8–1	7–2	15–3	Report
2	Krazy (United States)	1–1	(Kazakhstan) Aizara	8–1	3–6	11–7	Report
3	Nikastar (Ukraine)	2–0	(United States) Krazy	7–2	8–1	15–3	Report
4	Aizara (Kazakhstan)	2–0	(Bulgaria) A2K	8–1	5–4	13–5	Report
5	Aizara (Kazakhstan)	0–2	(Ukraine) Nikastar	0–9	0–9	0–18	Report
6	A2K (Bulgaria)	1–1	(United States) Krazy	4–5	7–2	11–7	Report

==== Group C ====
Group C standings
Rank	Breaker (seed)	Nickname	Rounds	Votes	Qualified
1	Alicia Babarro (ESP) (3)	Mini Ali	6	51	Q
2	Nawel Ennadre (MAR) (9)	Nawel	3	20	Q
3	Song Min-ji (KOR) (10)	Minji	2	23	Q
4	Melina Fernández (GER) (4)	Melkez	1	14	

Match	Red Side	Score	Blue Side	Round 1	Round 2	Total Votes	Report
1	Melkez (Germany)	0–2	(Spain) Mini Ali	0–9	0–9	0–18	Report
2	Minji (South Korea)	0–2	(Morocco) Nawel	4–5	3–6	7–11	Report
3	Nawel (Morocco)	0–2	(Spain) Mini Ali	2–7	1–8	3–15	Report
4	Melkez (Germany)	0–2	(South Korea) Minji	1–8	1–8	2–16	Report
5	Mini Ali (Spain)	2–0	(South Korea) Minji	9–0	8–0	18–0	Report
6	Nawel (Morocco)	1–1	(Germany) Melkez	5–4	1–8	6–12	Report

=== Knockout stage ===
The top two breakdancers from each group and the two best third-placed breakdancers advanced to the quarter-finals. The two best third-placed breakdancers were Reese and Minji.

Quarter-finals
A1	Hiyo (JPN)	3
C3	Minji (KOR)	0
B2	Aizara (KAZ)	0
C2	Nawel (MAR)	3
C1	Mini Ali (ESP)	3
A2	Queen Lolita (FRA)	0
B1	Nikastar (UKR)	3
A3	Reese (MAS)	0

Semi-finals
Hiyo (JPN)	3
Nawel (MAR)	0
Mini Ali (ESP)	1
Nikastar (UKR)	2

Gold medal battle
Hiyo (JPN)	2
Nikastar (UKR)	1
Bronze medal battle
Nawel (MAR)	0
Mini Ali (ESP)	3

=== Final classification ===
Rank	Breaker	Nickname	Nation
1st place, gold medalist(s)	Hiyo Yamada	Hiyo	Japan
2nd place, silver medalist(s)	Nikol Dzhuryk	Nikastar	Ukraine
3rd place, bronze medalist(s)	Alicia Babarro	Mini Ali	Spain
4	Nawel Ennadre	Nawel	Morocco
5	Aizara Zhumabekova	Aizara	Kazakhstan
6	Lolita Dauphin	Queen Lolita	France
7	Tia Clarissa	Reese	Malaysia
8	Song Min-ji	Minji	South Korea
9	Keira Barth	Krazy	United States
10	Aya Kraeva	A2K	Bulgaria
11	Melina Fernández	Melkez	Germany
12	Suzanne Toure	Suzz	Senegal

== See also ==
- Breaking at the 2026 Summer Youth Olympics – B-Boys
