= Artistic gymnastics at the 2026 Summer Youth Olympics – Men's individual all-around =

Artistic gymnastics event at the 2026 Summer Youth Olympics

Men's all-around at the IV Summer Youth Olympic Games
- Venue: Dakar Expo Center
- Date: 10 November 2026
- Competitors: 18 from 14 nations
- Winning score: 81.298

Medalists
1st place, gold medalist(s)		Daniil Smirnov	Russia
2nd place, silver medalist(s)		Uzair Chowdhury	Great Britain
3rd place, bronze medalist(s)		Ikki Nishihara	Japan

The men's artistic individual all-around at the 2026 Summer Youth Olympics was held on November 10 at the Dakar Expo Center.

== Qualification ==
Eighteen gymnasts qualified into the all-around final with a max of two gymnasts per NOC.

== Medalists ==
Gold	Silver	Bronze
Daniil Smirnov; Russia	Uzair Chowdhury; Great Britain	Ikki Nishihara; Japan

== Final ==
Position	Gymnast	Floor (gymnastics)	Pommel horse	Rings (gymnastics)	Vault (gymnastics)	Parallel bars	Horizontal bar	Total
1st place, gold medalist(s)	Daniil Smirnov (RUS)	13.600	13.966	12.666	13.866	14.000	13.200	81.298
2nd place, silver medalist(s)	Uzair Chowdhury (GBR)	13.800	11.733	12.900	13.733	14.200	12.766	79.132
3rd place, bronze medalist(s)	Ikki Nishihara (JPN)	13.466	13.100	11.733	13.300	13.700	13.766	79.065
4	Yang Lanbin (CHN)	14.033	12.500	12.533	13.766	12.500	13.133	78.465
5	Naoto Shiroiwa (JPN)	13.233	12.333	11.900	12.400	13.133	13.266	76.265
6	Li Lezheng (CHN)	11.366	11.033	12.700	12.866	13.533	13.466	74.964
7	Giacomo Capuzzo (ITA)	12.866	12.133	12.033	12.233	12.833	12.766	74.864
8	Maxime Rolin (BEL)	12.733	12.333	11.900	12.533	12.966	12.266	74.731
9	Samuel Wachter (AUT)	13.233	10.200	11.966	13.500	12.766	12.566	74.231
10	Adballah Shaarawy (EGY)	12.433	12.066	11.600	12.600	13.166	12.266	74.131
11	Áron Zsolt Horváth (HUN)	12.333	11.133	11.700	13.466	12.866	12.600	74.098
12	Otger Carreres (ESP)	12.766	11.766	11.966	13.000	12.100	11.966	73.564
13	Zeno Csuka (GER)	11.466	11.933	11.300	13.300	12.700	11.400	72.099
14	Lorenzo Zaragoza Riveira (MEX)	12.366	11.333	11.700	12.666	12.166	11.566	71.797
15	Benjamín Fernández (ARG)	10.666	12.266	10.966	14.133	10.733	12.766	71.530
16	Tomer Tirosh (ISR)	12.466	10.800	11.700	12.166	11.566	11.933	70.631
17	Arthur Olyslaegers (BEL)	9.466	12.233	10.966	12.166	12.800	11.100	68.731
18	Andrei Mihai (GER)	8.866	11.733	11.700	11.633	12.300	12.066	68.298
