= 2026 European Artistic Gymnastics Championships =

The 2026 European Artistic Gymnastics Championships consist of the following competitions to be held at Arena Zagreb in Zagreb, Croatia:

- 2026 European Men's Artistic Gymnastics Championships, to be held from 19 to 23 August 2026;
- 2026 European Women's Artistic Gymnastics Championships, to be held from 13 to 16 August 2026.
