= Iori Miyazaki =

Japanese swimmer (born 2009)

Personal information
- Full name: Iori Miyazaki
- Nationality: Japan
- Born: 23 September 2009 (age 17) Shizuoka, Japan

Sport
- Sport: Swimming
- Strokes: Breaststroke, Individual medley
- Club: Hamanako Swimming School
Medal record
Men's swimming
Representing Japan
Youth Olympic Games
Gold medal – first place	2026 Dakar	200 m breaststroke
Gold medal – first place	2026 Dakar	200 m individual medley
Silver medal – second place	2026 Dakar	100 m breaststroke
Junior Pan Pacific Championships
Gold medal – first place	2026 Vancouver	200 m breaststroke
Asian Championships
Silver medal – second place	2025 Ahmedabad	200 m breaststroke

Iori Miyazaki (宮崎 緒里, Miyazaki Iori; born 23 September 2009) is a Japanese swimmer specializing in breaststroke. He won the gold medal in the 200 metres breaststroke at the 2026 Junior Pan Pacific Swimming Championships and at the 2026 Summer Youth Olympics.

== Biography ==
Miyazaki was born in Shizuoka Prefecture, Japan. He is the son of Yoshinobu Miyazaki, a former competitive breaststroke swimmer who represented Japan at the 1996 Summer Olympics in Atlanta. Miyazaki trained at the Hamanako Swimming School and attended Hamamatsu Niitsu Junior High School. In August 2024, at the All Japan Junior High School Championships in Kanazawa, he won the national junior high school title in the 200 m breaststroke. At the National Junior Olympic Cup later that year, he set a tournament record for the 13–14 age bracket in the 400 metres individual medley with a time of 4:21.88.

In 2025, he entered Hamamatsu Commercial High School. As a first-year student, he captured the Inter-High School Championship title in the 200m breaststroke, finishing in 2:11.11. In late 2025, Miyazaki won his first senior international medal by taking the silver medal in the 200m breaststroke at the Asian Aquatics Championships in Ahmedabad, India, with a time of 2:12.47.

In August 2026, Miyazaki competed at the Junior Pan Pacific Swimming Championships in Vancouver, Canada, where he won the gold medal in the 200m breaststroke in a personal best time of 2:10.10. Later that year, on 2 November 2026, he secured the gold medal in the men's 200m breaststroke at the 2026 Summer Youth Olympics in Dakar, Senegal, finishing with a winning time of 2:12.33. At the same event, Miyazaki won a gold medal in the 200-meter individual medley and a silver medal in the 100-meter breaststroke.
