= Table tennis at the 2026 Summer Youth Olympics – Men's singles =

Boys' singles at the 2026 Summer Youth Olympics
- Venue: Dakar Expo Center (DEX Pavillon A)
- Dates: 1–4 November 2026
- Competitors: 32

Medalists
gold medal	Ryuusei Kawakami	Japan
silver medal	Emanuel Otalvaro	Colombia
bronze medal	Lee Seung-soo	South Korea

Table tennis at the 2026 Summer Youth Olympics – Men's singles is one of the events at the 2026 Summer Youth Olympics in Dakar, Senegal. It is held from 1 to 4 November 2026 at the Dakar Expo Center (DEX Pavillon A).

== Format ==
The tournament consists of a preliminary stage with 8 groups of 4 players. The top two players from each group advance to Round of 16 knockout stage. All matches in the preliminary stage are played as best-of-five games, and the knockout stage is best-of-seven games.

== Seedings ==
Seedings are based on the ITTF Youth Rankings published on October 26, 2026.

1. (Japan) Ryuusei Kawakami
2. (Colombia) Emanuel Otalvaro
3. (South Korea) Lee Seungsoo
4. (Iran) Benyamin Faraji
5. (Hong Kong) Li Ki Ho
6. (China) Li Hechen
7. (Chinese Taipei) Lin Chinting
8. (Romania) Robert Istrate
9. (Puerto Rico) Steven Moreno
10. (Poland) Patryk Zywronek
11. (Italy) Francesco Trevisan
12. (Turkey) Gorkem Ocal
13. (Brazil) Felipe Okano
14. (Thailand) Thitaphat Preechayan
15. (France) Noah Vitel
16. (Spain) Ladimir Mayorov
17. (Egypt) Abdelmalk Elsayed
18. (Argentina) Agustin Asmu
19. (Costa Rica) Lucca Lobo Diaz
20. (Luxembourg) Aaron Sahra
21. (New Zealand) Xiao August
22. (Germany) Jonas Rinderer
23. (Venezuela) Jonathan Vega
24. (Nigeria) Mathew Kuti
25. (Australia) Chang Ting Chia
26. (Uganda) Joseph Sebatindira
27. (Algeria) Aylan Goudjil
28. (Tunisia) Youssef Aidli
29. (Ecuador) Boris Villavicencio
30. (Peru) Samuel Duffoo
31. (Benin) Ganiou Abdourahaman
32. (Senegal) Amador Ferrer

== Preliminary stage ==
The top two players from each group advanced to the knockout stage.

=== Group 1 ===
Player	Pld	W	L	GW	GL	Pts
(Japan) Ryuusei Kawakami (1)	3	3	0	9	0	6
(Argentina) Agustin Asmu (18)	3	2	1	6	5	5
(Brazil) Felipe Okano (13)	3	1	2	5	6	4
(Benin) Ganiou Abdourahaman (31)	3	0	3	0	9	3

=== Group 2 ===
Player	Pld	W	L	GW	GL	Pts
(Colombia) Emanuel Otalvaro (2)	3	3	0	9	0	6
(France) Noah Vitel (15)	3	2	1	6	4	5
(Peru) Samuel Duffoo (30)	3	1	2	4	7	4
(Costa Rica) Lucca Lobo Diaz (19)	3	0	3	1	9	3

=== Group 3 ===
Player	Pld	W	L	GW	GL	Pts
(South Korea) Lee Seungsoo (3)	3	3	0	9	1	6
(Spain) Ladimir Mayorov (16)	3	2	1	7	4	5
(Luxembourg) Aaron Sahra (20)	3	1	2	4	6	4
(Senegal) Amador Ferrer (32)	3	0	3	0	9	3

=== Group 4 ===
Player	Pld	W	L	GW	GL	Pts
(Iran) Benyamin Faraji (4)	3	3	0	9	0	6
(Egypt) Abdelmalk Elsayed (17)	3	2	1	6	4	5
(Thailand) Thitaphat Preechayan (14)	3	1	2	4	6	4
(Ecuador) Boris Villavicencio (29)	3	0	3	0	9	3

=== Group 5 ===
Player	Pld	W	L	GW	GL	Pts
(Hong Kong) Li Ki Ho (5)	3	3	0	9	0	6
(Italy) Francesco Trevisan (11)	3	2	1	6	3	5
(Nigeria) Mathew Kuti (24)	3	1	2	3	7	4
(Tunisia) Youssef Aidli (28)	3	0	3	1	9	3

=== Group 6 ===
Player	Pld	W	L	GW	GL	Pts
(China) Li Hechen (6)	3	3	0	9	1	6
(Turkey) Gorkem Ocal (12)	3	2	1	7	5	5
(Germany) Jonas Rinderer (22)	3	1	2	5	7	4
(Algeria) Aylan Goudjil (27)	3	0	3	1	9	3

=== Group 7 ===
Player	Pld	W	L	GW	GL	Pts
(Puerto Rico) Steven Moreno (9) (Note: Steven Moreno and Lin Chin-ting both have 5 points. Since Moreno beats Lin Chin-ting 3-1, he will be the winner of the group.)	3	2	1	6	4	5
(Chinese Taipei) Lin Chinting (7)	3	2	1	7	3	5
(Australia) Chang Ting Chia (25)	3	1	2	4	8	4
(New Zealand) Xiao August (21)	3	1	2	4	6	4

=== Group 8 ===
Player	Pld	W	L	GW	GL	Pts
(Poland) Patryk Zywronek (10)	3	3	0	9	4	6
(Romania) Robert Istrate (8)	3	2	1	8	4	5
(Venezuela) Jonathan Vega (23)	3	1	2	4	6	4
(Uganda) Joseph Sebatindira (26)	3	0	3	2	9	3

== Knockout stage ==
Round of 16
1	(Japan) Kawakami R.	11	11	11	11
17	(Egypt) Elsayed A.	4	7	6	3
11	(Italy) Trevisan F.	11	4	7	11	9	8
9	(Puerto Rico) Moreno S.	8	11	11	4	11	11
10	(Poland) Zywronek P.	11	5	10	15	8	8
12	(Turkey) Ocal G.	8	11	12	13	11	11
15	(France) Vitel N.	11	7	8	16	11	10	4
3	(South Korea) Lee S.	6	11	11	14	6	12	11
4	(Iran) Faraji B.	11	11	12	3	11	10	9
7	(Chinese Taipei) Lin C.	6	9	14	11	3	12	11
8	(Romania) Istrate R.	4	7	7	11	3
5	(Hong Kong) Li K. H.	11	11	11	4	11
6	(China) Li H.	11	11	14	11
18	(Argentina) Asmu A.	3	5	12	4
16	(Spain) Mayorov L.	4	9	6	13
2	(Colombia) Otalvaro E.	11	11	11	15

Quarterfinals
1	(Japan) Kawakami R.	11	11	11	11
9	(Puerto Rico) Moreno S.	8	8	9	7
12	(Turkey) Ocal G.	6	12	9	13	7
3	(South Korea) Lee S.	11	10	11	15	11
7	(Chinese Taipei) Lin C.	11	8	10	12	9
5	(Hong Kong) Li K. H.	3	11	12	14	11
6	(China) Li H.	10	11	3	12	10
2	(Colombia) Otalvaro E.	12	13	11	10	12

Semifinals
1	(Japan) Kawakami R.	11	18	11	2	11	11
3	(South Korea) Lee S.	6	20	7	11	7	3
5	(Hong Kong) Li K. H.	6	7	11	6	7
2	(Colombia) Otalvaro E.	11	11	9	11	11

Final
1	(Japan) Kawakami R.	15	11	13	6	2	11
2	(Colombia) Otalvaro E.	13	7	11	11	11	6
Third place
3	(South Korea) Lee S.	11	11	11	8	15	15
5	(Hong Kong) Li K. H.	8	8	5	11	17	13
