= Table tennis at the 2026 Summer Youth Olympics – Mixed doubles =

Mixed doubles at the 2026 Summer Youth Olympics
- Venue: Dakar Expo Center (DEX Pavillon A)
- Dates: 1–3 November 2026
- Competitors: 23 pairs

Medalists
gold medal	Ryuusei Kawakami; Miku Matsushima	Japan
silver medal	Li Ki Ho; Su Tsz Tung	Hong Kong
bronze medal	Lin Chin-ting; Chen Min-hsin	Chinese Taipei

Table tennis at the 2026 Summer Youth Olympics – Mixed doubles is one of the events at the 2026 Summer Youth Olympics in Dakar, Senegal. It is held from 1 to 3 November 2026 at the Dakar Expo Center (DEX Pavillon A).

Japan's Miku Matsushima and Ryuusei Kawakami won the gold medal competition after beating pairs from Hong Kong, China. This is Japan's first gold medal since 2010.

== Format ==
The tournament consists of a straight single-elimination knockout format. All matches are played as best-of-five games.

== Seedings ==
Seedings are based on the ITTF Youth Rankings published on October 26, 2026.

1. (China) Li Hechen / Yao Ruixuan
2. (France) Noah Vitel / Nina Guo Zheng
3. (Thailand) Thitaphat Preechayan / Kulapassr Vijitviriyagul
4. (Puerto Rico) Steven Moreno / Valentina Davila
5. (Hong Kong) Li Ki Ho / Su Tsz Tung
6. (Venezuela) Jonathan Vega / Dakota Ferrer
7. (Chinese Taipei) Lin Chinting / Chen Min-hsin
8. (Japan) Ryuusei Kawakami / Miku Matsushima
9. (Romania) Robert Istrate / Andreea Baiasu
10. (South Korea) Lee Seungsoo / Heo Yerim
11. (Egypt) Abdelmalk Elsayed / Yara Elbadawy
12. (Poland) Patryk Zywronek / Katarzyna Rajkowska
13. (Algeria) Aylan Goudjil / Tania Morice
14. (Tunisia) Youssef Aidli / Ela Saidi
15. (New Zealand) Xiao August / Anzhuo Han
16. (Nigeria) Mathew Kuti / Favour Ojo
17. (Ecuador) Boris Villavicencio / Karolayn Maldonado
18. (Germany) Jonas Rinderer / Koharu Itagaki
19. (Brazil) Felipe Okano / Bianca Borges
20. (Peru) Samuel Duffoo / Natzumi Aquije
21. (Australia) Chang Ting Chia / Daisy Xie
22. (Uganda) Joseph Sebatindira / Jemimah Nakawala
23. (Senegal) Amador Ferrer / Marieme Diallo

== Main draw ==
=== Bronze medal match ===
Bronze medal match
7	(Chinese Taipei) Lin C. (Chinese Taipei) Chen M. H. (bronze)	3
3	(Thailand) Preechayan T. (Thailand) Vijitviriyagul K.	2

=== Final ===
Final
8	(Japan) Kawakami (Japan) Matsushima (gold)	3
5	(Hong Kong) Li (Hong Kong) Su (silver)	1

=== Upper Half ===
Round of 32
21	(Australia) Chang T. C. (Australia) Xie D.	0
15	(New Zealand) Xiao A. (New Zealand) Han A.	3
14	(Tunisia) Aidli Y. (Tunisia) Saidi E.	3
22	(Uganda) Sebatindira J. (Uganda) Nakawala J.	0
20	(Peru) Duffoo S. (Peru) Aquije N.
12	(Poland) Zywronek P. (Poland) Rajkowska K.	3
10	(South Korea) Lee S. (South Korea) Heo Y.	3
19	(Brazil) Okano F. (Brazil) Borges B.	0

Round of 16
1	(China) Li H. (China) Yao R.	3
15	(New Zealand) Xiao A. (New Zealand) Han A.	0
14	(Tunisia) Aidli Y. (Tunisia) Saidi E.	0
8	(Japan) Kawakami R. (Japan) Matsushima M.	3
7	(Chinese Taipei) Lin C. (Chinese Taipei) Chen M. H.	3
12	(Poland) Zywronek P. (Poland) Rajkowska K.	1
10	(South Korea) Lee S. (South Korea) Heo Y.	1
4	(Puerto Rico) Moreno S. (Puerto Rico) Davila V.	3

Quarterfinals
1	(China) Li H. (China) Yao R.	1
8	(Japan) Kawakami R. (Japan) Matsushima M.	3
7	(Chinese Taipei) Lin C. (Chinese Taipei) Chen M. H.	3
4	(Puerto Rico) Moreno S. (Puerto Rico) Davila V.	1

Semifinals
8	(Japan) Kawakami R. (Japan) Matsushima M.	3
7	(Chinese Taipei) Lin C. (Chinese Taipei) Chen M. H.	1

=== Lower Half ===
Round of 32
13	(Algeria) Goudjil A. (Algeria) Morice T.	3
17	(Ecuador) Villavicencio B. (Ecuador) Maldonado K.	1
23	(Senegal) Ferrer A. (Senegal) Diallo M.	0
11	(Egypt) Elsayed A. (Egypt) Elbadawy Y.	3
9	(Romania) Istrate R. (Romania) Baiasu A.	3
18	(Germany) Rinderer J. (Germany) Itagaki K.	0

Round of 16
3	(Thailand) Preechayan T. (Thailand) Vijitviriyagul K.	3
16	(Nigeria) Kuti M. (Nigeria) Ojo F.	1
13	(Algeria) Goudjil A. (Algeria) Morice T.	1
6	(Venezuela) Vega J. (Venezuela) Ferrer D.	3
5	(Hong Kong) Li K. H. (Hong Kong) Su T. T.	3
11	(Egypt) Elsayed A. (Egypt) Elbadawy Y.	1
9	(Romania) Istrate R. (Romania) Baiasu A.	0
2	(France) Vitel N. (France) Guo Zheng N.	3

Quarterfinals
3	(Thailand) Preechayan T. (Thailand) Vijitviriyagul K.	3
6	(Venezuela) Vega J. (Venezuela) Ferrer D.	1
5	(Hong Kong) Li K. H. (Hong Kong) Su T. T.	3
2	(France) Vitel N. (France) Guo Zheng N.	1

Semifinals
3	(Thailand) Preechayan T. (Thailand) Vijitviriyagul K.	1
5	(Hong Kong) Li K. H. (Hong Kong) Su T. T.	3
