= Artistic gymnastics at the 2026 Summer Youth Olympics – Mixed team =

Mixed team at the IV Summer Youth Olympic Games
- Venue: Dakar Expo Center
- Date: 7–8 November 2026 (qualifying); 11 November 2026 (final)
- Competitors: 24 from 12 nations

Medalists
1st place, gold medalist(s)		Yang Lanbin; Chen Ziyan	China
2nd place, silver medalist(s)		Ikki Nishihara; Yume Minamino	Japan
3rd place, bronze medalist(s)		Tomer Tirosh; Ophir Shmuely	Israel

The mixed team event at the 2026 Summer Youth Olympics was held on 11 November 2026 at the Dakar Expo Center.

== Qualifications ==
Rank	Team	Men			Women			Total	Qual.
Rank	Team	Floor (gymnastics)	Parallel bars	Horizontal bar	Uneven bars	Balance beam	Floor (gymnastics)	Total	Qual.
1	China	13.766	13.433	13.700	14.000	14.233	12.766	81.898	Q
2	Japan	13.600	13.366	13.966	13.366	13.766	13.066	81.130	Q
3	Great Britain	13.300	14.133	12.866	12.300	11.600	12.533	76.732	Q
4	Russia	12.733	13.733	10.366	14.000	12.733	12.900	76.465	Q
5	Italy	11.833	12.366	13.200	12.600	12.866	13.066	75.931	Q
6	France	12.733	12.766	12.100	13.466	11.400	13.300	75.765	Q
7	Belgium	12.466	12.966	12.766	12.433	11.366	12.400	74.397	Q
8	Egypt	12.766	12.800	12.000	12.000	11.833	12.100	73.499	Q
9	Australia	13.000	12.133	11.466	11.866	12.533	12.266	73.264	Q
10	Israel	12.600	11.466	12.266	12.300	11.866	12.633	73.131	Q
11	Canada	12.000	12.133	12.000	11.700	11.900	12.766	72.499	Q
12	Spain	11.833	12.300	12.300	12.333	11.133	11.766	71.665	Q
13	Ukraine	12.600	11.500	11.433	12.366	10.966	11.700	70.565	R1

== Final ==
Rank	Team	Round 1	Round 2	Round 3
1st place, gold medalist(s)	China	26.132 (2)	26.666 (1)	27.832 (1)
1st place, gold medalist(s)	Yang Lanbin (CHN)	13.766	13.166	13.966
1st place, gold medalist(s)	Chen Ziyan (CHN)	12.366	13.500	13.866
2nd place, silver medalist(s)	Japan	26.600 (1)	26.333 (2)	25.966 (2)
2nd place, silver medalist(s)	Ikki Nishihara (JPN)	13.200	13.700	13.900
2nd place, silver medalist(s)	Yume Minamino (JPN)	13.400	12.633	12.066
3rd place, bronze medalist(s)	Israel	25.333 (7)	25.299 (4)	24.366 (3)
3rd place, bronze medalist(s)	Tomer Tirosh (ISR)	12.533	12.966	11.866
3rd place, bronze medalist(s)	Ophir Shmuely (ISR)	12.800	12.333	12.500
4	Italy	25.333 (6)	26.233 (3)	23.200 (4)
4	Giacomo Capuzzo (ITA)	13.000	12.733	11.400
4	Clarissa Rinaldi (ITA)	12.333	13.500	11.800
5	Belgium	25.700 (3)	23.699 (5)	Did not advance
5	Maxime Rolin (BEL)	12.900	12.433	Did not advance
5	Emma Sneessens (BEL)	12.800	11.266	Did not advance
6	Egypt	25.299 (8)	22.733 (6)	Did not advance
6	Adballah Shaarawy (EGY)	13.233	11.633	Did not advance
6	Tia El-Midany (EGY)	11.166	11.100	Did not advance
7	Spain	25.633 (4)	22.333 (7)	Did not advance
7	Otger Carreres (ESP)	12.900	10.700	Did not advance
7	Victoria Valeros (ESP)	12.733	11.633	Did not advance
8	Australia	25.366 (5)	21.366 (8)	Did not advance
8	Elijah Wu (AUS)	12.800	9.833	Did not advance
8	Alice Johnson (AUS)	12.566	11.533	Did not advance
9	Great Britain	24.666 (9)	Did not advance	
9	Uzair Chowdhury (GBR)	13.500	Did not advance	
9	Helena Finc (GBR)	11.166	Did not advance	
10	Canada	24.533 (10)	Did not advance	
10	Jaydon De Silva (CAN)	12.733	Did not advance	
10	Nikita Théodat (CAN)	11.800	Did not advance	
11	France	24.532 (11)	Did not advance	
11	Gaël Cazin (FRA)	12.066	Did not advance	
11	Louane Plisson (FRA)	12.466	Did not advance	
12	Russia	24.499 (12)	Did not advance	
12	Daniil Smirnov (RUS)	11.533	Did not advance	
12	Polina Dmitrieva (RUS)	12.966	Did not advance	
