= Polina Dmitrieva =

Russian artistic gymnast

- Полина Дмитриева
- Full name: Polina Dmitrieva
- Born: 13 January 2012 (age 14) Bashkortostan, Russia

Gymnastics career
- Discipline: Women's artistic gymnastics
- Country represented: Russia; (2024–present)
- Club: Sterlitamak Olympic Reserve Sports School
Medal record
Representing Russia
Youth Olympic Games
Gold medal – first place	2026 Dakar	All-around

Polina Yurievna Dmitrieva (Russian: Полина Юрьевна Дмитриева; born 13 January 2012) is a Russian artistic gymnast. She was a four-time gold medalist at the 2026 Junior European Championships.

== Early life ==
Dmitrieva was born in Bashkortostan, Russia in 2012.

== Gymnastics career ==
Dmitrieva competed at the 2026 Russian National Championships where she recorded a score of 54.999, surpassing the senior national champion's, Anna Kalmykova, score of 54.299. She competed at the 2026 Junior European Championships where she helped Russia win team gold (under the banner of World Gymnastics 2). Individually she won silver in the all-around behind compatriot Aleksandra Andrianova. During event finals she won gold on the uneven bars, balance beam, and floor exercise.

Dmitrieva was selected to represent Russia at the 2026 Youth Olympic Games. While there she won gold in the all-around, becoming the third Russian to achieve the feat after Viktoria Komova and Seda Tutkhalyan did so in 2010 and 2014 respectively. She also competed in the inaugural mixed team final alongside Daniil Smirnov. They finished twelfth and were eliminated in the first round.

== Competitive history ==
Competitive history of Polina Dmitrieva at the junior level
Year	Event	Team	AA	VT	UB	BB	FX
2025	Russian Championships	2nd place, silver medalist(s)	1st place, gold medalist(s)				
2026	Russian Team Championships	5	1st place, gold medalist(s)				
2026	AGF Trophy	1st place, gold medalist(s)	1st place, gold medalist(s)	1st place, gold medalist(s)	1st place, gold medalist(s)	1st place, gold medalist(s)	1st place, gold medalist(s)
2026	Senior Russian Championships		1 (Note: Dmitrieva earned the highest all-around score but did not place due to being age-ineligible for senior level competition)				
2026	European Championships	1st place, gold medalist(s)	2nd place, silver medalist(s)		1st place, gold medalist(s)	1st place, gold medalist(s)	1st place, gold medalist(s)
2026	Youth Olympic Games		1st place, gold medalist(s)				
