= Yume Minamino =

Japanese artistic gymnast (born 2011)

- 南埜 佑芽
- Born: 14 September 2011 (age 15)

Gymnastics career
- Discipline: Women's artistic gymnastics
- Country represented: Japan
Medal record
Representing Japan
Youth Olympic Games
Silver medal – second place	2026 Dakar	Team
Silver medal – second place	2026 Dakar	Mixed team
Junior World Championships
Gold medal – first place	2025 Manila	All-around
Silver medal – second place	2025 Manila	Team
Silver medal – second place	2025 Manila	Balance beam

Yume Minamino (Japanese: 南埜 佑芽; born 14 September 2011) is a Japanese artistic gymnast. She is the 2025 Junior World all-around champion.

== Junior gymnastics career ==
In November 2025, Minamino competed at the 2025 Junior World Championships. She helped the Japanese team win a silver medal with a score of 107.930, finishing behind France. In the all-around final she won a gold medal with a score of 53.632. At that same competition, she performed a new uneven bars skill, a full-twisting piked Jaeger. The skill was added to the Code of Points as the Minamino.

In June 2026, she competed at the 2026 Junior Asian Gymnastics Championships and helped the Japanese team win a silver medal with a score of 157.329, finishing behind China. Individually, she won silver on vault and bronze in the all-around. In November 2026, she represented Japan at the 2026 Summer Youth Olympics. She helped Japan qualify in second place in the team competition. Individually she qualified in fourth to all-around with 52.465 points. During the inaugural team final she helped Japan win silver with a score of 107.564. She also won a silver medal in the inaugural mixed team event, along with Ikki Nishihara.

== Eponymous skill ==
Apparatus	Name	Description	Difficulty (Note: Valid for the 2025–2028 Code of Points)	Added to the Code of Points
Uneven bars	Minamino	Jaeger salto piked with 1/1 turn (360 degrees) to hang on high bar	F (0.6)	2025 Junior World Championships
