= Ikki Nishihara =

Japanese artistic gymnast (born 2010)

- 西原一輝
- Born: 14 September 2010 (age 16)

Gymnastics career
- Discipline: Men's artistic gymnastics
- Country represented: Japan
Medal record
Representing Japan
Youth Olympic Games
Silver medal – second place	2026 Dakar	Team
Silver medal – second place	2026 Dakar	Mixed team
Bronze medal – third place	2026 Dakar	All-around

Ikki Nishihara (Japanese: 西原一輝; born 14 September 2010) is a Japanese artistic gymnast. He is the 2026 Junior Asian Championships all-around champion.

== Gymnastics career ==
In June 2026, Nishihara competed at the 2026 Junior Asian Gymnastics Championships and won gold in the all-around, pommel horse, parallel bars and horizontal bar. He also won silver in the team competition and on floor exercise.

In November 2026, he represented Japan at the 2026 Summer Youth Olympics. He helped Japan qualify in second place in the team competition. Individually he qualified in fourth to the all-around with 77.865 points. During the inaugural team final he helped Japan win silver with a score of 156.230. He also won a silver medal in the inaugural mixed team event, along with Yume Minamino.

== Competitive history ==
Competitive history of Ikki Nishihara
Year	Event	Team	AA	FX	PH	SR	VT	PB	HB
2026
2026	Asian Championships	2nd place, silver medalist(s)	1st place, gold medalist(s)	2nd place, silver medalist(s)	1st place, gold medalist(s)			1st place, gold medalist(s)	1st place, gold medalist(s)
2026	Youth Olympic Games	2nd place, silver medalist(s)	3rd place, bronze medalist(s)						
