= Yang Lanbin =

Chinese gymnast (born 2009)

- Born: 26 March 2009 (age 17)

Gymnastics career
- Discipline: Men's artistic gymnastics
- Country represented: China
Medal record
Representing China
Youth Olympic Games
Gold medal – first place	2026 Dakar	Team
Gold medal – first place	2026 Dakar	Mixed team
Junior World Championships
Gold medal – first place	2025 Manila	Team
Gold medal – first place	2025 Manila	Floor
Bronze medal – third place	2025 Manila	All-around
Bronze medal – third place	2025 Manila	Parallel bars

Yang Lanbin (Chinese: 杨兰斌; born 26 March 2009) is a Chinese artistic gymnast and a member of China men's national artistic gymnastics team. He is the 2025 Junior World floor champion.

== Gymnastics career ==
In November 2025, Yang competed at the 2025 Junior World Artistic Gymnastics Championships and won gold in the team event and on floor exercise. He also won bronze in the individual all-around and on parallel bars.

In June 2026, he competed at the 2026 Junior Asian Gymnastics Championships and won gold in the team event. Individually he won silver on parallel bars and bronze in the individual all-around and on horizontal bar. In November 2026, he represented China at the 2026 Summer Youth Olympics. He helped China qualify in first place in the team competition. Individually he finished second in the all-around qualification with 79.897 points. During the inaugural team final he helped China win gold with a score of 158.463. He also won a gold medal in the inaugural mixed team event, along with Chen Ziyan.

== Competitive history ==
Competitive history of Yang Lanbin
Year	Event	Team	AA	FX	PH	SR	VT	PB	HB
2024
2024	Asian Championships	1st place, gold medalist(s)	2nd place, silver medalist(s)					1st place, gold medalist(s)	2nd place, silver medalist(s)
2025
2025	Junior World Championships	1st place, gold medalist(s)	3rd place, bronze medalist(s)	1st place, gold medalist(s)				3rd place, bronze medalist(s)	
2026
2026	Asian Championships	1st place, gold medalist(s)	3rd place, bronze medalist(s)					2nd place, silver medalist(s)	3rd place, bronze medalist(s)
2026	Youth Olympic Games	1st place, gold medalist(s)	4						
