= Daniil Smirnov (gymnast) =

Russian artistic gymnast

- Даниил Смирнов
- Full name: Daniil Alekseyevich Smirnov
- Born: 24 November 2008 (age 17)

Gymnastics career
- Discipline: Men's artistic gymnastics
- Country represented: Russia
- Club: Olympic Reserve School No. 1
Medal record
Representing Russia
Youth Olympic Games
Gold medal – first place	2026 Dakar	All-around

Daniil Alekseyevich Smirnov (Russian: Даниил Алексеевич Смирнов; born 24 November 2008) is a Russian artistic gymnast. He is the 2026 Youth Olympic Games all-around champion.

== Gymnastics career ==
At the 2026 European Championships, Smirnov won all-around gold in the junior division. Smirnov was selected to represent Russia at the 2026 Youth Olympic Games. While there he won gold in the all-around, becoming the first Russian to achieve the feat after Nikita Nagornyy and Sergei Naidin won silver in 2014 and 2018 respectively. He also competed in the inaugural mixed team final alongside Polina Dmitrieva. They finished twelfth and were eliminated in the first round.

== Competitive history ==
Competitive history of Daniil Smirnov
Year	Event	Team	AA	FX	PH	SR	VT	PB	HB
2023	Russian Junior Championships		3rd place, bronze medalist(s)	2nd place, silver medalist(s)	3rd place, bronze medalist(s)	1st place, gold medalist(s)	2nd place, silver medalist(s)	6	
2023	Minsk Friendly	2nd place, silver medalist(s)							
2023	Kazan Friendly				1st place, gold medalist(s)				
2024	Russian Junior Championships		3rd place, bronze medalist(s)		6		3rd place, bronze medalist(s)		3rd place, bronze medalist(s)
2024	Belarus Open Cup	2nd place, silver medalist(s)	1st place, gold medalist(s)	2nd place, silver medalist(s)	1st place, gold medalist(s)	8	2nd place, silver medalist(s)		5
2025	Russian Junior Championships	3rd place, bronze medalist(s)	2nd place, silver medalist(s)						
2025	Youth Spartakiade		1st place, gold medalist(s)		1st place, gold medalist(s)	2nd place, silver medalist(s)	1st place, gold medalist(s)	2nd place, silver medalist(s)	5
2025	Strongest Athletes Cup						2nd place, silver medalist(s)	1st place, gold medalist(s)	
2026	Russian Cup	4	7	7	5				
2026	AGF Trophy	1st place, gold medalist(s)	1st place, gold medalist(s)	1st place, gold medalist(s)		1st place, gold medalist(s)	1st place, gold medalist(s)	1st place, gold medalist(s)	2nd place, silver medalist(s)
2026	Russian Championships	4	4	3rd place, bronze medalist(s)	1st place, gold medalist(s)	6			
2026	Junior European Championships	2nd place, silver medalist(s)	1st place, gold medalist(s)		6				3rd place, bronze medalist(s)
2026	Youth Olympic Games		1st place, gold medalist(s)						
