= Artistic gymnastics at the 2026 Summer Youth Olympics – Men's team all-around =

Men's artistic team all-around at the IV Summer Youth Olympic Games
- Venue: Dakar Expo Center
- Date: 7 November 2026 (qualifying); 9 November 2026 (final)
- Competitors: 24 from 8 nations
- Winning total: 158.463

Medalists
1st place, gold medalist(s)		Li Lezheng; Yang Lanbin; Zhao Ruiyang	China
2nd place, silver medalist(s)		Hiroto Fujimoto; Ikki Nishihara; Naoto Shiroiwa	Japan
3rd place, bronze medalist(s)		Uzair Chowdhury; Benjamin Porter; Lucas Scully	Great Britain

The men's artistic team all-around at the 2026 Summer Youth Olympics was held on 9 November 2026 at the Dakar Expo Center.

== Qualifications ==
The top eight teams in qualifications, based on combined scores of each apparatus, advanced to the final.

Rank	Team	Floor (gymnastics)	Pommel horse	Rings (gymnastics)	Vault (gymnastics)	Parallel bars	Horizontal bar	Total
1	China	27.432	24.899	25.966	28.332	25.833	26.766	159.228
2	Japan	26.500	24.400	25.633	27.632	26.699	27.732	158.596
3	Great Britain	25.500	26.333	24.933	26.999	23.933	25.132	152.830
4	Belgium	24.632	25.199	23.833	25.632	25.066	25.266	149.628
5	Germany	24.732	25.432	24.333	27.000	23.366	24.733	149.596
6	Italy	23.533	24.099	24.300	26.633	23.999	25.566	148.130
7	Egypt	25.032	23.266	24.033	25.333	24.400	23.700	145.764
8	Mexico	25.232	22.099	24.166	26.966	23.500	23.032	144.995

== Final ==
Rank	Team	Floor (gymnastics)	Pommel horse	Rings (gymnastics)	Vault (gymnastics)	Parallel bars	Horizontal bar	Total
1st place, gold medalist(s)	China	27.266 (1)	25.766 (2)	24.800 (3)	27.899 (2)	26.666 (1)	26.066 (1)	158.463
1st place, gold medalist(s)	Li Lezheng			12.000		13.266	13.766	158.463
1st place, gold medalist(s)	Yang Lanbin	13.500	13.233	12.800	13.933	13.400	12.300	158.463
1st place, gold medalist(s)	Zhao Ruiyang	13.766	12.533		13.966			158.463
2nd place, silver medalist(s)	Japan	25.433 (2)	25.266 (3)	25.433 (1)	28.066 (1)	26.666 (1)	25.366 (3)	156.230
2nd place, silver medalist(s)	Hiroto Fujimoto	12.833	12.266	12.733	14.333	13.200		156.230
2nd place, silver medalist(s)	Ikki Nishihara	12.600	13.000			13.466	13.500	156.230
2nd place, silver medalist(s)	Naoto Shiroiwa			12.700	13.733		11.866	156.230
3rd place, bronze medalist(s)	Great Britain	24.833 (5)	26.700 (1)	23.899 (5)	27.266 (3)	25.199 (3)	25.866 (2)	153.763
3rd place, bronze medalist(s)	Uzair Chowdhury	12.200	13.400	12.633	13.933	13.833	13.133	153.763
3rd place, bronze medalist(s)	Benjamin Porter	12.633		11.266	13.333			153.763
3rd place, bronze medalist(s)	Lucas Scully		13.300			11.366	12.733	153.763
4	Germany	25.399 (3)	24.999 (6)	23.533 (7)	26.499 (6)	23.666 (6)	24.899 (5)	148.995
4	Zeno Csuka		11.833		13.266	12.066		148.995
4	Kimi Köhnlein	13.066		12.200	13.233		12.333	148.995
4	Andrei Mihai	12.333	13.166	11.333		11.600	12.566	148.995
5	Belgium	24.866 (4)	25.199 (4)	23.166 (8)	15.299 (8)	23.833 (4)	25.333 (4)	147.696
5	Arthur Olyslaegers	12.400				12.233	12.633	147.696
5	Maxime Rolin	12.466	12.266	11.900	12.633	11.600	12.700	147.696
5	Henri Vanassche		12.933	11.266	12.666			147.696
6	Egypt	23.832 (6)	25.133 (5)	23.633 (6)	25.399 (7)	23.266 (7)	24.299 (6)	145.562
6	Mohamed Abdelkawy		12.900			11.566	11.966	145.562
6	Mazen El-Sayed	11.566		11.733	12.133			145.562
6	Abdallah Shaarawy	12.266	12.233	11.900	13.266	11.700	12.333	145.562
7	Mexico	23.432 (7)	20.666 (8)	25.366 (2)	27.099 (4)	23.832 (5)	22.699 (8)	143.094
7	Hugo Pérez		11.466		13.233			143.094
7	Saul Valenzuela	11.066		12.600		11.366	9.766	143.094
7	Lorenzo Zaragoza Riveira	12.366	9.200	12.766	13.866	12.466	12.933	143.094
8	Italy	21.966 (8)	22.832 (7)	24.000 (4)	26.866 (5)	22.899 (8)	22.933 (7)	141.496
8	Michele Boshchetti	10.066	11.766		13.300	11.066		141.496
8	Giacomo Capuzzo	11.900	11.066	12.000	13.566	11.833	13.200	141.496
8	Alessandro Salvati			12.000			9.733	141.496
