= Uzair Chowdhury =

British gymnast (born 2009)

- Chowdhury at the 2025 Junior World Championships

Personal information
- Born: 15 February 2009 (age 17)

Gymnastics career
- Discipline: Men's artistic gymnastics
- Country represented: (United Kingdom) Great Britain
- Gym: Huntingdon Olympic Gymnastics Club
Medal record
Representing Great Britain
Youth Olympic Games
Silver medal – second place	2026 Dakar	All-around
Bronze medal – third place	2026 Dakar	Team

Uzair Chowdhury (born 15 February 2009) is a British artistic gymnast and a member of Great Britain men's national artistic gymnastics team.

== Gymnastics career ==
Chowdhury began gymnastics at six years old. In April 2024, he competed at the 2024 Junior European Gymnastics Championships and won gold on parallel bars with a score of 14.066. He also helped Great Britain win gold in the team event.

In July 2025, he competed at the 2025 European Youth Summer Olympic Festival and won gold in the team event and on rings and parallel bars, and bronze in the individual all-around. In November 2025, he competed at the 2025 Junior World Artistic Gymnastics Championships and placed seventh on parallel bars.

On 7 July 2026, he was selected to represent Great Britain at the 2026 Junior European Gymnastics Championships. He won a gold medal in the team event and on parallel bars. He also scored 77.898 overall to qualify into the all-around.

On 14 September 2026, he was selected to represent Great Britain at the 2026 Summer Youth Olympics. He finished first in the all-around qualification with 80.798 points. During the inaugural team final he helped Great Britain win bronze with a score of 153.763.

== Personal life ==
Chowdhury is of Bangladeshi descent.

== Competitive history ==
Competitive history of Uzair Chowdhury
Year	Event	Team	AA	FX	PH	SR	VT	PB	HB
2024	Junior European Championships	1st place, gold medalist(s)						1st place, gold medalist(s)	
2025	European Youth Olympic Festival	1st place, gold medalist(s)	3rd place, bronze medalist(s)			1st place, gold medalist(s)		1st place, gold medalist(s)	
2025	Junior World Championships	5						7	
2026
2026	Junior European Championships	1st place, gold medalist(s)						1st place, gold medalist(s)	
2026	Youth Olympic Games	3rd place, bronze medalist(s)	2nd place, silver medalist(s)						
