= Naoto Shiroiwa =

Japanese artistic gymnast (born 2009)

- 白岩 直翔
- Born: 20 September 2009 (age 17)

Gymnastics career
- Discipline: Men's artistic gymnastics
- Country represented: Japan
Medal record
Representing Japan
Youth Olympic Games
Silver medal – second place	2026 Dakar	Team

Naoto Shiroiwa (Japanese: 白岩 直翔; born 20 September 2009) is a Japanese artistic gymnast.

== Gymnastics career ==
In November 2026, Shiroiwa represented Japan at the 2026 Summer Youth Olympics. He helped Japan qualify in second place in the team competition. Individually he qualified in third to the all-around with 79.265 points. During the inaugural team final he helped Japan win silver with a score of 156.230.

== Competitive history ==
Competitive history of Naoto Shiroiwa
Year	Event	Team	AA	FX	PH	SR	VT	PB	HB
2026
2026	Youth Olympic Games	2nd place, silver medalist(s)	5						
