= France at the 2026 Summer Youth Olympics =

- Flag of France
- IOC code: FRA
- NOC: French National Olympic and Sports Committee
- Website: cnosf.franceolympique.com

in Dakar, Senegal October 31, 2026 – November 13, 2026
- Competitors: 69 in 11 sports
- Medals: Gold 4 Silver 5 Bronze 4 Total 13

Summer Youth Olympics appearances
- 2010; 2014; 2018; 2026

France is scheduled to compete at the 2026 Summer Youth Olympics in Dakar, Senegal from October 31 to November 13, 2026. This will mark France's fourth appearance at the Youth Olympics, after making its debut in 2010.

== Competitors ==
The following is the list of number of competitors participating at the Games per sport/discipline.

Sport	Men	Women	Total
3x3 basketball	0	4	4
Archery	1	1	2
Artistic gymnastics	3	3	6
Athletics	2	2	4
Baseball5	TBA	TBA	5
Beach handball	0	10	10
Boxing	0	1	1
Breaking	0	1	1
Road cycling	1	1	2
Rugby sevens	7	0	0
Triathlon	0	1	1
Total	TBA	TBA	41

== 3x3 basketball ==
France qualified a girls' team.

Summary

Event	Pool play			Quarterfinal	Semifinal	Final / BM	
Event	Opposition Score	Opposition Score	Group Rank	Opposition Score	Opposition Score	Opposition Score	Rank
Girls' tournament							

Roster

- Emmy Breton
- Joana Konate
- Alycia Olimpa
- Astou Seye

== Archery ==
France entered two archers, one of each gender.

Boys

Athlete	Event	Time	Rank
Maël Lamouret	Boys's individual		1st place, gold medalist(s)

== Artistic gymnastics ==
France entered six gymnasts, two squads of 3 boys and 3 girls each.

Boys
Team

Athlete	Event	Qualification								Final							
Athlete	Event	Apparatus						Total	Rank	Apparatus						Total	Rank
Athlete	Event	F	PH	R	V	PB	HB	Total	Rank	F	PH	R	V	PB	HB	Total	Rank
Gaël Cazin	Team	12.566	10.233	11.633	12.900	11.266	11.433	70.031	35	Did not qualify							
Hugo Jeanperrin	Team	10.366	11.933	11.133	12.133	12.766	11.733	70.064	34	Did not qualify							
Tom Jolivet	Team	12.733	10.633	10.533	13.366	10.833	12.100	70.198	33	Did not qualify							
Total	Team	25.299	22.566	22.766	26.266	24.032	23.833	144.762	9	Did not qualify							

Girls
Team

Athlete	Event	Qualification						Final					
Athlete	Event	Apparatus				Total	Rank	Apparatus				Total	Rank
Athlete	Event	V	UB	BB	FX	Total	Rank	V	UB	BB	FX	Total	Rank
Caly Chayani	Team	12.966	11.466	10.800	12.766	47.998	19			12.400	12.600	—N/a	
Lilou Marliac	Team	13.033	13.266	10.933	11.466	48.698	16 Q	13.100	13.466			—N/a	
Louane Plisson	Team	13.166	13.466	11.400	13.300	51.332	7 Q	13.333	13.600	13.566	13.166	—N/a	
Total	Team	26.199	26.732	22.333	26.066	101.330	4 Q	26.433	27.066	25.966	25.766	105.231	3rd place, bronze medalist(s)

Individual all-around

Athlete	Event	Final					
Athlete	Event	Apparatus				Total	Rank
Athlete	Event	V	UB	BB	FX	Total	Rank
Lilou Marliac	All-around	13.166	12.833	11.700	11.733	49.432	9
Louane Plisson	All-around	13.333	13.666	13.833	12.833	53.665	2nd place, silver medalist(s)

Mixed
Mixed team

Athlete	Event	Final																				
Athlete	Event	Round 1							Round 2							Round 3						
Athlete	Event	Apparatus					Total	Rank	Apparatus					Total	Rank	Apparatus					Total	Rank
Athlete	Event	F	PB	HB	UB	BB	Total	Rank	F	PB	HB	UB	BB	Total	Rank	F	PB	HB	UB	BB	Total	Rank
Gaël Cazin	Mixed team	—N/a		12.066	—N/a		24.532	11	did not advance													
Louane Plisson	Mixed team	12.466	—N/a				24.532	11	did not advance													

== Athletics ==
Boys

Athlete	Event	Time	Rank
	3000 metre steeplechase		

Athlete	Event	Height	Rank
Axel Faye	Pole vault		1st place, gold medalist(s)

Girls

Athlete	Event	Time	Rank
	100 metre hurdles		

Athlete	Event	Height	Rank
Julie Bourgis	Pole vault		1st place, gold medalist(s)

== Baseball5 ==
Team	Event	Group stage				Quarterfinal	Semifinal	Gold medal match	
Team	Event	Opposition Score	Opposition Score	Opposition Score	Rank	Opposition Score	Opposition Score	Opposition Score	Rank
France	Mixed	Mexico	Kenya	Syria					

== Beach handball ==
France qualified a girls' team.

Team	Event	Group stage				Quarterfinal	Semifinal	Gold medal match	
Team	Event	Opposition Score	Opposition Score	Opposition Score	Rank	Opposition Score	Opposition Score	Opposition Score	Rank
France girls'	Girls	Uruguay	Kenya	Senegal					

== Boxing ==
France will enter one girl.

Athlete	Event	Round of 16	Quarterfinals	Semifinals	Final	
Athlete	Event	Opposition Result	Opposition Result	Opposition Result	Opposition Result	Rank
	Girls' –57 kg					

== Breaking ==
France qualified one B-Girl.

Athlete	Nickname	Event	Round-robin		Quarterfinal	Semifinal	Final / BM	
Athlete	Nickname	Event	Points	Rank	Opposition Result	Opposition Result	Opposition Result	Rank
Lolita Dauphin	Queen Lolita	B-Girls						

== Road cycling ==
Boys

Athlete	Event	Time	Rank
	Boys' road race		
	Boys' road time trial		

Girls

Athlete	Event	Time	Rank
	Girls' road race		
	Girls' road time trial		

== Rugby sevens ==
France qualified a boys' team.

Team	Event	Group stage				Semifinal	Final / BM	
Team	Event	Opposition Score	Opposition Score	Opposition Score	Rank	Opposition Score	Opposition Score	Rank
France boys'	Boys	Japan; W 48–0	Uganda; W 58–0	Argentina; W 24–7	1 Q	Canada; W 58–0	South Africa; W 26-19	1st place, gold medalist(s)

France is participating in the men’s tournament. Several players took part in the U-18 European Championship in Prague in July.

Roster

- Noah Champet
- Roman Delample
- Pablo Grabajosa
- Gaspard Laharrague
- Simon Laharrague
- Matt Lefeuvre
- Sacha Leroy
- Dorian Petitgenet
- Nicolas Ripert
- Nathanaël Senga Kouo
- Matéo Tambo Fantcho
- Jules Vermeulen

== Triathlon ==
France qualified one girl.

Athlete	Event	Time						Rank
Athlete	Event	Swim (750 km)	Trans 1	Bike (20 km)	Trans 2	Run (5 km)	Total	Rank
	Girls							
