= Great Britain at the 2026 Summer Youth Olympics =

- Flag of Great Britain
- IOC code: GBR
- NOC: British Olympic Association
- Website: www.teamgb.com

in Dakar, Senegal October 31, 2026 – November 13, 2026
- Competitors: 16 in 7 sports
- Medals: Gold 0 Silver 1 Bronze 1 Total 2

Summer Youth Olympics appearances (overview)
- 2010; 2014; 2018; 2026

Great Britain is scheduled to compete at the 2026 Summer Youth Olympics in Dakar, Senegal from October 31 to November 13, 2026. This will mark Great Britain's fourth appearance at the Youth Olympics, after making its debut in 2010.

== Competitors ==
The following is the list of number of competitors participating at the Games per sport/discipline.

Sport	Men	Women	Total
Archery	1	1	2
Artistic gymnastics	3	2	5
Total	4	3	7

== Archery ==
Great Britain entered two archers, one of each gender.

== Artistic gymnastics ==
Great Britain entered six artistic gymnasts, three of each gender. Their third female gymnast, Jamie Reyner-Corbett, withdrew before the start of the competition and was not replaced.

Boys
Team

Athlete	Event	Qualification								Final							
Athlete	Event	Apparatus						Total	Rank	Apparatus						Total	Rank
Athlete	Event	F	PH	R	V	PB	HB	Total	Rank	F	PH	R	V	PB	HB	Total	Rank
Uzair Chowdhury	Team	13.300	13.433	13.133	13.933	14.133	12.866	80.798	1 Q	12.200	13.400	12.633	13.933	13.833	13.133	—N/a	
Benjamin Porter	Team	11.833	12.100	11.800	13.066	9.800	12.266	70.865	30	12.633		11.266	13.333			—N/a	
Lucas Scully	Team	12.200	12.900	9.200	12.566	8.900	10.666	66.432	46		13.300			11.366	12.733	—N/a	
Total	Team	25.500	26.333	24.933	26.999	23.933	25.132	152.830	3 Q	24.833	26.700	23.899	27.266	25.199	25.866	153.763	3rd place, bronze medalist(s)

Individual all-around

Athlete	Event	Final							
Athlete	Event	Apparatus						Total	Rank
Athlete	Event	F	PH	R	V	PB	HB	Total	Rank
Uzair Chowdhury	All-around	13.800	11.733	12.900	13.733	14.200	12.766	79.132	2nd place, silver medalist(s)

Girls
Team

Athlete	Event	Qualification						Final					
Athlete	Event	Apparatus				Total	Rank	Apparatus				Total	Rank
Athlete	Event	V	UB	BB	FX	Total	Rank	V	UB	BB	FX	Total	Rank
Helena Finc	Team	12.633	12.300	11.600	12.533	49.066	14 Q	Did not qualify					
Jenitha Johnson	Team	12.433	12.133					Did not qualify					
Total	Team	25.066	24.433	11.600	12.533	73.632	12	Did not qualify					

Individual all-around

Athlete	Event	Final					
Athlete	Event	Apparatus				Total	Rank
Athlete	Event	V	UB	BB	FX	Total	Rank
Helena Finc	All-around	13.133	12.466	12.066	12.366	50.031	8

Mixed
Mixed team

Athlete	Event	Final																				
Athlete	Event	Round 1							Round 2							Round 3						
Athlete	Event	Apparatus					Total	Rank	Apparatus					Total	Rank	Apparatus					Total	Rank
Athlete	Event	F	PB	HB	UB	BB	Total	Rank	F	PB	HB	UB	BB	Total	Rank	F	PB	HB	UB	BB	Total	Rank
Uzair Chowdhury	Mixed team	13.500	—N/a				24.666	9	did not advance													
Helena Finc	Mixed team	—N/a				11.166	24.666	9	did not advance													
