= Spain at the 2026 Summer Youth Olympics =

- Flag of Spain
- IOC code: ESP
- NOC: Spanish Olympic Committee
- Website: www.coe.es

in Dakar, Senegal October 31, 2026 – November 13, 2026
- Competitors: 2 in 1 sport
- Medals: Gold 0 Silver 1 Bronze 1 Total 2

Summer Youth Olympics appearances (overview)
- 2010; 2014; 2018; 2026

Spain is scheduled to compete at the 2026 Summer Youth Olympics in Dakar, Senegal from October 31 to November 13, 2026. This will mark Spain's fourth appearance at the Youth Olympics, after making its debut in 2010.

== Competitors ==
The following is the list of number of competitors participating at the Games per sport/discipline.

Sport	Men	Women	Total
Artistic gymnastics	1	1	2
Archery	1	1	2
Rugby sevens	0	12	12
Total	2	14	16

== Archery ==
Spain entered two archers, one of each gender.

== Artistic gymnastics ==
Spain entered two artistic gymnasts, one of each gender.

Boys

Athlete	Event	Qualification								Final							
Athlete	Event	Apparatus						Total	Rank	Apparatus						Total	Rank
Athlete	Event	F	PH	R	V	PB	HB	Total	Rank	F	PH	R	V	PB	HB	Total	Rank
Otger Carreres	Boys' all-around	11.833	13.233	11.966	13.333	12.300	12.300	74.965	11 Q	12.766	11.766	11.966	13.000	12.100	11.966	73.564	12

Girls

Athlete	Event	Qualification						Final					
Athlete	Event	Apparatus				Total	Rank	Apparatus				Total	Rank
Athlete	Event	V	UB	BB	F	Total	Rank	V	UB	BB	F	Total	Rank
Victoria Valeros	Girls' all-around	12.533	12.333	11.133	11.766	47.765	23	did not qualify					

Mixed
Mixed team

Athlete	Event	Final																				
Athlete	Event	Round 1							Round 2							Round 3						
Athlete	Event	Apparatus					Total	Rank	Apparatus					Total	Rank	Apparatus					Total	Rank
Athlete	Event	F	PB	HB	UB	BB	Total	Rank	F	PB	HB	UB	BB	Total	Rank	F	PB	HB	UB	BB	Total	Rank
Otger Carreres	Mixed team	12.900	—N/a				25.633	4 Q	—N/a	10.700	—N/a			22.333	7	did not advance						
Victoria Valeros	Mixed team	—N/a			12.733	—N/a	25.633	4 Q	—N/a				11.533	22.333	7	did not advance						

== Rugby sevens ==
Summary

Event	Group stage				Semifinal	Final / BM	
Event	Opposition Score	Opposition Score	Opposition Score	Group Rank	Opposition Score	Opposition Score	Rank
Women's tournament	Czech Republic; L 17–35	Madagascar; L 12–19	United States; L 0–14	4	China; L 0–39	Senegal; W 27–0	7
