= Italy at the 2026 Summer Youth Olympics =

- Flag of Italy
- IOC code: ITA
- NOC: Italian National Olympic Committee
- Website: www.coni.it

in Dakar, Senegal October 31, 2026 – November 13, 2026
- Competitors: 2 in 1 sport
- Medals: Gold 0 Silver 0 Bronze 1 Total 1

Summer Youth Olympics appearances
- 2010; 2014; 2018; 2026

Italy is scheduled to compete at the 2026 Summer Youth Olympics in Dakar, Senegal from October 31 to November 13, 2026. This will mark Italy's fourth appearance at the Youth Olympics, after making its debut in 2010.

== Competitors ==
The following is the list of number of competitors participating at the Games per sport/discipline.

Sport	Men	Women	Total
Archery	1	1	2
Total	1	1	2

== Archery ==
Italy entered two archers, one of each gender.

== Artistic gymnastics ==
Italy entered six artistic gymnasts, three of each gender.

Boys
Team

Athlete	Event	Qualification								Final							
Athlete	Event	Apparatus						Total	Rank	Apparatus						Total	Rank
Athlete	Event	F	PH	R	V	PB	HB	Total	Rank	F	PH	R	V	PB	HB	Total	Rank
Michele Boschetti	Team	11.833	11.466	11.033	13.233	11.566	12.366	71.497	25	10.066	11.766		13.300	11.066		—N/a	
Giacomo Capuzzo	Team	11.700	11.933	12.100	13.400	12.366	13.200	74.699	12 Q	11.900	11.066	12.000	13.566	11.833	13.200	—N/a	
Alessandro Salvati	Team	11.600	12.166	12.200	12.333	11.633	12.200	72.132	21			12.000			9.733	—N/a	
Total	Team	23.533	24.099	24.300	26.633	23.999	25.566	148.130	6 Q	21.966	22.832	24.000	26.866	22.899	22.933	141.496	8

Individual all-around

Athlete	Event	Final							
Athlete	Event	Apparatus						Total	Rank
Athlete	Event	F	PH	R	V	PB	HB	Total	Rank
Giacomo Capuzzo	All-around	12.866	12.133	12.033	12.233	12.833	12.766	74.864	11

Girls
Team

Athlete	Event	Qualification						Final					
Athlete	Event	Apparatus				Total	Rank	Apparatus				Total	Rank
Athlete	Event	V	UB	BB	FX	Total	Rank	V	UB	BB	FX	Total	Rank
Dalila D'Aniello	Team	12.733	12.466	11.800	11.766	48.765	15	12.666	12.366			—N/a	
Sofia Frenna	Team	11.766	12.600	12.366	12.433	49.165	12 Q			11.666	11.866	—N/a	
Clarissa Rinaldi	Team	13.300	10.966	12.866	13.066	50.198	9 Q	13.233	13.300	12.866	12.333	—N/a	
Total	Team	26.033	25.066	25.232	25.499	101.830	3 Q	25.899	25.666	24.532	24.199	100.296	4

Individual all-around

Athlete	Event	Final					
Athlete	Event	Apparatus				Total	Rank
Athlete	Event	V	UB	BB	FX	Total	Rank
Sofia Frenna	All-around	11.300	11.366	12.066	11.666	46.398	16
Clarissa Rinaldi	All-around	13.133	13.500	13.700	12.733	53.066	4

Mixed
Mixed team

Athlete	Event	Final																				
Athlete	Event	Round 1							Round 2							Round 3						
Athlete	Event	Apparatus					Total	Rank	Apparatus					Total	Rank	Apparatus					Total	Rank
Athlete	Event	F	PB	HB	UB	BB	Total	Rank	F	PB	HB	UB	BB	Total	Rank	F	PB	HB	UB	BB	Total	Rank
Giacomo Capuzzo	Mixed team	—N/a	13.000	—N/a			25.333	6 Q	—N/a		12.733	—N/a		26.233	3 Q	11.400	—N/a				23.200	4
Clarissa Rinaldi	Mixed team	12.333	—N/a				25.333	6 Q	—N/a			13.500	—N/a	26.233	3 Q	—N/a				11.800	23.200	4
