= Asian Artistic Gymnastics Championships – Women's team all-around =

The Asian Artistic Gymnastics Championships were first held in 1996.

Three medals are awarded: gold for first place, silver for second place, and bronze for third place.

== Medalists ==
Year	Location	Gold	Silver	Bronze
1996	(China) Changsha	China	North Korea	South Korea
2003	(China) Guangzhou	China; Zhang Nan; Fan Ye; Chen Miaojie; Wang Tiantian	Japan; Manami Ishizaka; Kyoko Oshima; Ayaka Sahara; Erika Mizoguchi	South Korea; Jin Dal-lae; Park Kyung-ah; Kim Seol-hee; Kang Ji-na
2006	(India) Surat	China; Zhou Zhuoru; He Ning; Han Bing; Zhang Xin	North Korea; Pyon Kwang-sun; Hong Su-jong; Hong Un-jong; Kim Un-hyang	Japan; Manami Ishizaka; Miki Uemura; Setsubai Takaseki; Kyoko Oshima
2008	(Qatar) Doha	Japan; Kōko Tsurumi; Miki Uemura; Yu Minobe; Rie Tanaka; Kyoko Oshima; Yuko Shintake	South Korea; Park Eun-kyung; Han Byul; Jo Hyun-joo; Park Ha-yan; Han Eun-bi; Kim Da-eun	Singapore; Lim Heem Wei; Nicole Tay; Tabitha Tay; Sarah Ng
2012	(China) Putian	China; Wu Liufang; Luo Peiru; Li Yiting; Zeng Siqi; Huang Huidan; Shang Chunsong	North Korea; Hong Un-jong; Kim Un-hyang; Kang Yong-mi; Ri Un-ha; Pak Sin-hyang; Kim So-yong	Japan; Mirai Sekiguchi; Shizuka Tozawa; Erica Lynn Danko; Sakura Noda; Risa Konishi; Wakana Inoue
2015	(Japan) Hiroshima	Japan; Aiko Sugihara; Natsumi Sasada; Asuka Teramoto; Sakura Yumoto; Yuki Uchiyama; Sae Miyakawa	China; Wang Yan; Mao Yi; Fan Yilin; Chen Siyi; Zhu Xiaofang; Xie Yufen	South Korea; Eum Da-yeon; Heo Seon-mi; Jeong Hee-yeon; Lee Hye-been; Kim Chae-yeon; Lee Eun-ju
2017	(Thailand) Bangkok	China; Liu Tingting; Luo Huan; Tan Jiaxin; Liu Jinru	North Korea; Jon Jang-mi; Pyon Rye-yong; Kim Won-yong; Kim Su-jong; Jong Un-gyong	Japan; Marina Kawasaki; Koko Dobashi; Nozomi Toyoda; Kasumi Murohashi; Honoka Koga
2019	(Mongolia) Ulaanbaatar	China; Lu Yufei; Liu Jieyu; Zhou Ruiyu; Yu Linmin; Zhao Shiting	Japan; Ayaka Sakaguchi; Arisa Sano; Ayumi Niiyama; Natsumi Hanashima; Marin Mune	South Korea; Ham Mi-ju; Lee Eun-ju; Kim Yeon-gi; Park Du-na
2022	(Qatar) Doha	China; Zhang Jin; Tang Xijing; Wu Ran; Sun Xinyi; Wei Xiaoyuan	South Korea; Lee Yun-seo; Yeo Seo-jeong; Shin Sol-yi; Lee Da-yeong; Lee Eun-ju	Japan; Shoko Miyata; Chiharu Yamada; Arisa Kasahara; Hazuki Watanabe; Touwa Matsuda
2023	Singapore	China; Chen Xinyi; Jia Ruoyi; Qiu Qiyuan; Zhang Qingying; Zhang Xinyi; Zuo Tong	South Korea; Eom Do-hyun; Lee Yun-seo; Lee Da-yeong; Lim Su-min; Shin Sol-yi; Yeo Seo-jeong	Chinese Taipei; Huang Tzu-hsing; Lai Pin-ju; Liao Yi-Chun; Lin Yi-chen; Ting Hua-tien; Wu Sing-fen
2024	(Uzbekistan) Tashkent	China; Chen Xinyi; Hu Jiafei; Jin Xiaoxuan; Qin Xinyi; Yang Fanyuwei	North Korea; Chon Jin-a; Jo Kyong-byol; Jon Jang-mi; Kim Son-hyang; Pak Un-jong	Uzbekistan; Lobar Amrillaeva; Dildora Aripova; Odinakhon Robidjonova; Aleksandra Shevchenko
2025	(South Korea) Jecheon	China; Qin Xinyi; Zhang Kexin; Zhang Xinyi; Zhang Yihan; Zhou Yaqin	Japan; Saki Kawakami; Rina Kishi; Haruka Nakamura; Aiko Sugihara	South Korea; Eom Do-hyun; Hwang Seo-hyun; Lee Yun-seo; Lim Su-min; Park Na-young
2026	(China) Zunyi	China; Du Siyu; Ke Qinqin; Qiu Qiyuan; Zhang Qingying; Zhang Yihan; Qin Xinyi	Japan; Rina Kishi; Shoko Miyata; Misa Nishiyama; Mana Okamura; Aiko Sugihara	South Korea; Hwang Seo-hyun; Lee Yun-seo; Lim Su-min; Park Na-young; Yeo Seo-jeong

== Medal table ==
Rank	Nation	Gold	Silver	Bronze	Total
1	China (CHN)	11	1	0	12
2	Japan (JPN)	2	4	4	10
3	North Korea (PRK)	0	5	0	5
4	South Korea (KOR)	0	3	6	9
5	Chinese Taipei (TPE)	0	0	1	1
5	Singapore (SGP)	0	0	1	1
5	Uzbekistan (UZB)	0	0	1	1
Totals (7 entries)		13	13	13	39
