= List of Olympic female artistic gymnasts for South Korea =

Gymnastics events have been staged at the Olympic Games since 1896, with women competing for the time at the 1928 Olympic Games. At the 2020 Olympic Games Yeo Seo-jeong became the first South Korean female artistic gymnast to win a medal.

== Gymnasts ==
Gymnast	Years
Bae Eun-mi	1988
Choi Mi-seon	2000
Choi Yeong-suk	1964
Eom Do-hyun	2024
Han Kyung-im	1988
Heo Seon-mi	2012
Im Hye-jin	1988
Jeong Bong-sun	1964
Jo Hyun-joo	2008
Kim Eun-mi	1988
Kim Nam-ok	1988
Kong Yun-jin	1996
Lee Da-yeong	2024
Lee Deok-bun	1964
Lee Eun-ju	2016
Lee Hee-kyung	1992
Lee Jung-hee	1984
Lee Yun-seo	2020, 2024
Min A-young	1992
Park Kyung-ah	2004
Park Ji-sook	1988
Shim Jae-young	1984
Shin Sol-yi	2024
Yeo Seo-jeong	2020, 2024
Yu Myeong-ja	1960

== Medalists ==
Medal	Name	Year	Event
Bronze	Yeo Seo-jeong	(Japan) 2020 Tokyo	Women's vault

== See also ==
- South Korea women's national artistic gymnastics team
