= Asian Artistic Gymnastics Championships – Women's floor =

The Asian Artistic Gymnastics Championships were first held in 1996.

Three medals are awarded: gold for first place, silver for second place, and bronze for third place.

== Medalists ==
Year	Location	Gold	Silver	Bronze
1996	(China) Changsha	(China) Meng Fei	(Uzbekistan) Oksana Chusovitina	(China) Mao Yanling
2003	(China) Guangzhou	(China) Zhang Nan	(China) Wang Tiantian	(Japan) Manami Ishizaka
2006	(India) Surat	(China) He Ning	(China) Zhou Zhuoru	(North Korea) Hong Su-jong
2008	(Qatar) Doha	(Japan) Kōko Tsurumi	(North Korea) Kim Un-hyang	(North Korea) Kang Yong-mi (Japan) Yuko Shintake
2012	(China) Putian	(China) Shang Chunsong	(Japan) Risa Konishi	(China) Zeng Siqi
2015	(Japan) Hiroshima	(China) Wang Yan	(Japan) Aiko Sugihara	(Japan) Sae Miyakawa
2017	(Thailand) Bangkok	(North Korea) Kim Su-jong (Japan) Honoka Koga	Not awarded	(South Korea) Lee Eun-ju
2019	(Mongolia) Ulaanbaatar	(Japan) Natsumi Hanashima	(South Korea) Lee Eun-ju	(China) Liu Jieyu
2022	(Qatar) Doha	(China) Wu Ran	(Japan) Shoko Miyata	(South Korea) Lee Yun-seo
2023	Singapore	(China) Zhang Qingying	(Philippines) Emma Malabuyo	(South Korea) Shin Sol-yi
2024	(Uzbekistan) Tashkent	(Philippines) Emma Malabuyo	(China) Chen Xinyi	(Kazakhstan) Aida Bauyrzhanova
2025	(South Korea) Jecheon	(China) Zhou Yaqin	(Japan) Aiko Sugihara	(Japan) Haruka Nakamura
2026	(China) Zunyi	(China) Zhang Yihan	(Japan) Aiko Sugihara	(China) Zhang Qingying

== Medal table ==
Rank	Nation	Gold	Silver	Bronze	Total
1	China (CHN)	9	3	4	16
2	Japan (JPN)	3	5	4	12
3	North Korea (PRK)	1	1	2	4
4	Philippines (PHI)	1	1	0	2
5	South Korea (KOR)	0	1	3	4
6	Uzbekistan (UZB)	0	1	0	1
7	Kazakhstan (KAZ)	0	0	1	1
Totals (7 entries)		14	12	14	40
