= Asian Artistic Gymnastics Championships – Women's balance beam =

The Asian Artistic Gymnastics Championships were first held in 1996.

Three medals are awarded: gold for first place, silver for second place, and bronze for third place.

== Medalists ==
Year	Location	Gold	Silver	Bronze
1996	(China) Changsha	(China) Mao Yanling (North Korea) Mok Un-ju	Not awarded	(China) Ji Liya
2003	(China) Guangzhou	(China) Zhang Nan	(China) Fan Ye	(Japan) Kyoko Oshima
2006	(India) Surat	(China) He Ning	(China) Han Bing	(North Korea) Kim Un-hyang
2008	(Qatar) Doha	(South Korea) Park Eun-kyung	(Japan) Yu Minobe	(North Korea) Kim Un-hyang
2012	(China) Putian	(China) Shang Chunsong	(North Korea) Kim Un-hyang	(China) Zeng Siqi
2015	(Japan) Hiroshima	(China) Fan Yilin	(Japan) Asuka Teramoto	(China) Wang Yan
2017	(Thailand) Bangkok	(China) Liu Tingting	(China) Luo Huan	(Chinese Taipei) Lai Pin-ju
2019	(Mongolia) Ulaanbaatar	(Chinese Taipei) Ting Hua-tien	(South Korea) Lee Eun-ju	(China) Zhou Ruiyu
2022	(Qatar) Doha	(China) Wu Ran	(Japan) Arisa Kasahara	(China) Zhang Jin
2023	Singapore	(China) Zhang Qingying	(China) Zhang Xinyi	(Philippines) Aleah Finnegan
2024	(Uzbekistan) Tashkent	(China) Qin Xinyi	(China) Chen Xinyi	(North Korea) Kim Son-hyang
2025	(South Korea) Jecheon	(South Korea) Hwang Seo-hyun	(Japan) Aiko Sugihara	(China) Zhou Yaqin
2026	(China) Zunyi	(China) Zhang Qingying	(China) Ke Qinqin	(South Korea) Hwang Seo-hyun

== Medal table ==
Rank	Nation	Gold	Silver	Bronze	Total
1	China (CHN)	10	6	6	22
2	South Korea (KOR)	2	1	1	4
3	North Korea (PRK)	1	1	3	5
4	Chinese Taipei (TPE)	1	0	1	2
5	Japan (JPN)	0	4	1	5
6	Philippines (PHI)	0	0	1	1
Totals (6 entries)		14	12	13	39
