= Hwang Seo-hyun =

South Korean artistic gymnast

- 황서현
- Born: October 10, 2009 (age 17)

Gymnastics career
- Country represented: South Korea
- Club: Incheon Sports High School
Medal record
Representing South Korea
Women's artistic gymnastics
Asian Games
Gold medal – first place	2026 Aichi-Nagoya	Balance beam
Asian Championships
Gold medal – first place	2025 Jecheon	Balance beam
Bronze medal – third place	2025 Jecheon	Team
Bronze medal – third place	2026 Zunyi	Team
Bronze medal – third place	2026 Zunyi	Balance beam

Hwang Seo-hyun (Korean: 황서현; born October 10, 2009) is a South Korean artistic gymnast. She is the 2026 Asian Games and 2025 Asian champion on balance beam.

== Junior Career ==
Hwang made her international debut at the 2022 Tournoi International in Combs-la-Ville, France. She placed twelfth in the all-around and qualified for the floor exercise final, where she ultimately won the gold medal ahead of Sabrina Voinea of Romania and Chloé Baert of Belgium.

In March, Hwang represented South Korea at the 2023 Junior World Championships. She competed in the all-around and qualified for the floor exercise final, finishing in seventh place. Later that year, she competed at the 2023 Junior Asian Championships, placing seventh in the all-around final. She qualified for the balance beam final, winning silver behind Tian Zhuofan of China. Hwang also competed in the floor exercise final, securing another silver medal finish behind Haruka Nakamura of Japan.

In April 2024, Hwang competed in the Middle School division of the South Korean Gymnastics Championships. There she won gold in the all-around and on balance beam, as well as silver on uneven bars and floor exercise. In May, she represented South Korea at the 2024 Junior Asian Championships. The South Korean team won bronze. Individually, Hwang won the gold medal on balance beam. She also placed fifth in the all-around and fourth in the floor exercise final.

== Senior Career ==
=== 2025 ===
In April 2025, Hwang made her senior debut at the South Korean Championships, competing in the Under 18 division. She won gold in the all-around, as well as gold on balance beam and floor exercise. She next competed at the 2025 Asian Championships, contributing to South Korea's bronze medal placement as a team. After qualifying for the balance beam final in ninth place, she ultimately won the gold medal ahead of Aiko Sugihara and Olympic silver medalist Zhou Yaqin. She also advanced to the floor exercise final, where she finished in fifth place.

Hwang competed in the High School division of the 2025 Korean National Sports Festival, where she won gold in the all-around and on balance beam, as well as bronze on floor exercise. In October, Hwang represented South Korea at the 2025 World Championships, alongside Lee Yun-seo, Shin Sol-yi, and Eom Do-hyun. She competed on balance beam and floor exercise in the qualification round, but she did not advance to any finals, with her best result being fifteenth on balance beam.

=== 2026 ===
Hwang competed at the South Korean Championships in April 2026. She won the gold medal on uneven bars, balance beam, and floor exercise, as well as the silver medal in the all-around, as part of the Under 18 division. At the 2026 Asian Championships, she helped South Korea win bronze as a team and individually she won bronze on the balance beam behind Zhang Qingying and Ke Qinqin.

In September, Hwang competed on balance beam at the 2026 Asian Games, contributing to South Korea's fourth-place finish as a team. After qualifying for the beam final in fifth place, she won the gold medal ahead of Qiu Qiyuan of China and Mana Okamura of Japan. This was South Korea's first gold medal in the event since 1986.

Hwang represented South Korea at the 2026 World Championships, with teammates Shin Sol-yi, Lee Yun-seo, Park Na-young, Lim Su-min, and Yeo Seo-jeong. They placed 17th as a team. Individually, Hwang finished ninth on balance beam, making her first reserve for the final.

== Competitive History ==
Competitive History of Hwang Seo-hyun at the junior level
	Event	Team	AA	VT	UB	BB	FX
2022	Tournoi International Combs-la-Ville	9	12				1st place, gold medalist(s)
2023
2023	Junior World Championships	18					7
2023	Asian Championships	4	7			2nd place, silver medalist(s)	2nd place, silver medalist(s)
2024	South Korean Championships		1st place, gold medalist(s)		2nd place, silver medalist(s)	1st place, gold medalist(s)	2nd place, silver medalist(s)
2024	Asian Championships	3rd place, bronze medalist(s)	5			1st place, gold medalist(s)	4

Competitive History of Hwang Seo-hyun at the senior level
Year	Event	Team	AA	VT	UB	BB	FX
2025	South Korean Championships		1st place, gold medalist(s)		7	1st place, gold medalist(s)	1st place, gold medalist(s)
2025	Asian Championships	3rd place, bronze medalist(s)				1st place, gold medalist(s)	5
2025	Korean National Sports Festival		1st place, gold medalist(s)			1st place, gold medalist(s)	3rd place, bronze medalist(s)
2025	World Championships					15	40
2026	South Korean Championships		2nd place, silver medalist(s)		1st place, gold medalist(s)	1st place, gold medalist(s)	1st place, gold medalist(s)
2026	Asian Championships	3rd place, bronze medalist(s)				3rd place, bronze medalist(s)	
2026	Asian Games	4				1st place, gold medalist(s)	
2026	World Championships	17				R1	
