= Yeo Hong-chul =

South Korean artistic gymnast

Yeo Hong-Chul
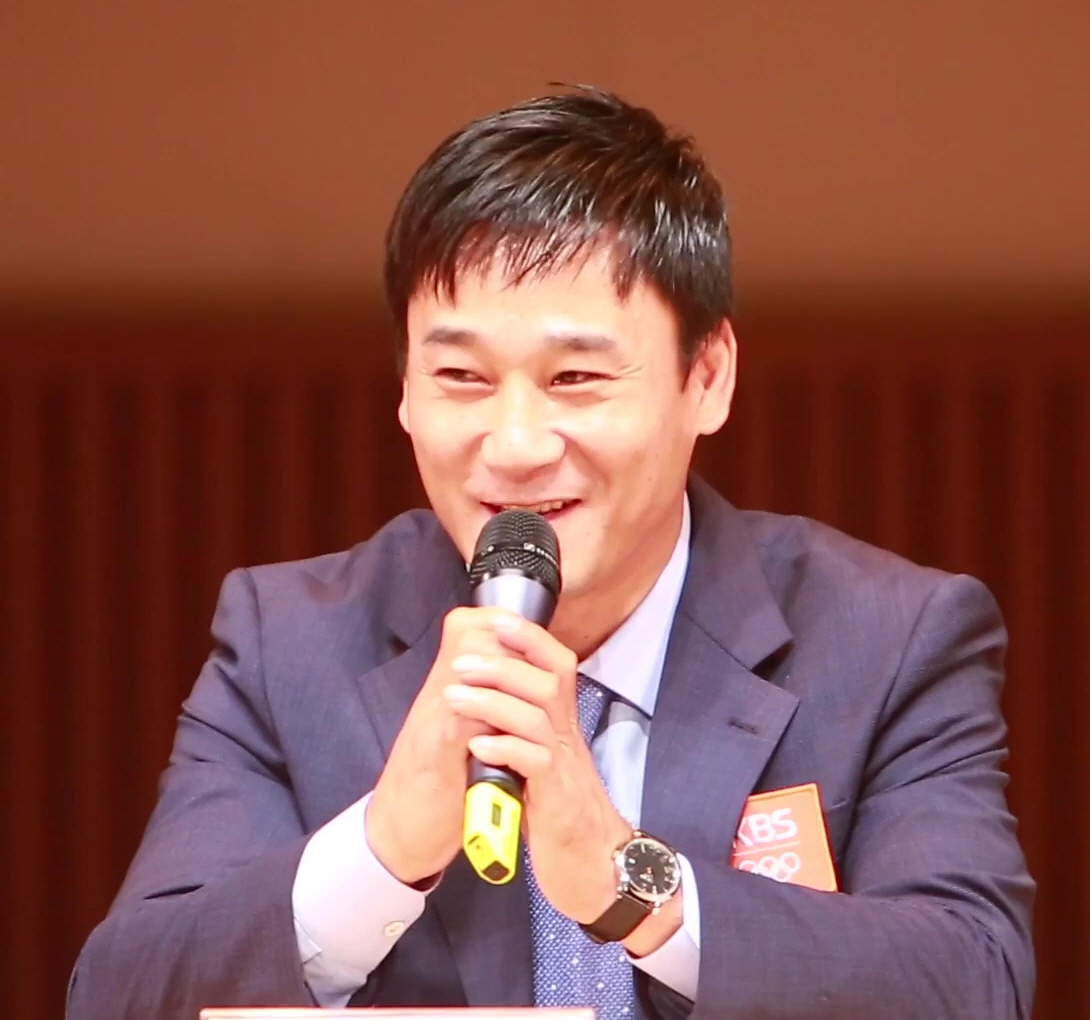

Personal information
- Born: May 28, 1971 (age 55) Gwangju, South Korea
- Height: 5 ft 4 1/2 in (164 cm)
- Relatives: Yeo Seo-jeong (daughter)

Gymnastics career
- Discipline: Men's artistic gymnastics
- Country represented: South Korea
- Eponymous skills: "Yeo I" and "Yeo II" in vault
- Retired: 2000
Medal record
Men's artistic gymnastics
Representing South Korea
Olympic Games
| Silver medal – second place | 1996 Atlanta | Vault |
World Championships
| Silver medal – second place | 1996 San Juan | Vault |
| Bronze medal – third place | 1994 Brisbane | Vault |
Universiade
| Gold medal – first place | 1991 Sheffield | Vault |
| Silver medal – second place | 1993 Buffalo | Vault |
Asian Games
| Gold medal – first place | 1994 Hiroshima | Vault |
| Gold medal – first place | 1998 Bangkok | Vault |
| Silver medal – second place | 1994 Hiroshima | Team |
| Silver medal – second place | 1998 Bangkok | Team |

Korean name
- Hangul: 여홍철
- Hanja: 呂洪哲
- RR: Yeo Hongcheol
- MR: Yŏ Hongch'ŏl

Yeo Hong-Chul (Korean: 여홍철; born 28 May 1971 in Gwangju) is a retired South Korean gymnast. He participated in three Olympics, winning a silver medal, and retired after the 2000 Summer Olympics.

== Career ==
Yeo won the silver medal in the vault event at the 1996 Summer Olympics. He also participated in 1992 Summer Olympics, 1994 Asian Games, 1998 Asian Games and 2000 Summer Olympics. After the 2000 Summer Olympics, he announced his retirement. He has two vault skills named after him. His daughter would later conceive her own eponymous FIG-recognized vault skill by combining the "Yeo I" and "Yeo II".

He competed on the Japanese obstacle course show, Sasuke, four different times (7th, 8th, 11th, 12th tournaments), but failed to clear the first stage every time.

After retiring, Yeo earned his doctorate degree at Korea National Sport University. He is a professor at Kyung Hee University's College of Physical Education. His research has largely been focused on the kinetic motions of elite athletes.

He served as a commentator for KBS's domestic broadcasts of artistic gymnastics events at the 2020 Summer Olympics.

== Personal life ==
Yeo is married to former artistic gymnast Kim Chae-eun (formerly Kim Yoon-ji), who also competed at the 1994 Asian Games and won a bronze medal in the team event. They have two daughters and remain involved in sports; besides lecturing, Yeo has been a guest commentator for gymnastics competitions while Kim is in an administrative role in the Korean Gymnastics Association. Their younger daughter, Yeo Seo-jeong, is also an Olympic medalist on vault, having won a bronze medal in the 2020 Olympic vault final.

== Filmography ==
=== Television shows ===
| Year | Title | Network | Role | Notes | Ref. |
|---|---|---|---|---|---|
| 2022 | Operation Time | KBS2 | Host | | |
