= Hu Xuwei =

Chinese artistic gymnast

- 胡旭威
- Born: 25 February 1997 (age 29)

Gymnastics career
- Country represented: China
- Club: Guangxi Province
- Head coach: Zheng Hao
Medal record
Representing China
World Championships
Gold medal – first place	2021 Kitakyushu	Parallel Bars
Gold medal – first place	2021 Kitakyushu	Horizontal Bar
Asian Championships
Gold medal – first place	2019 Ulaanbaatar	Team
Gold medal – first place	2019 Ulaanbaatar	Horizontal Bar
Silver medal – second place	2019 Ulaanbaatar	All-Around
Silver medal – second place	2019 Ulaanbaatar	Parallel Bars
National Games
Gold medal – first place	2021 Shaanxi	Horizontal Bar

Hu Xuwei (Chinese: 胡旭威; pinyin: Hú Xùwēi; born 25 February 1997) is a Chinese artistic gymnast. He competed in the 2019 Asian Artistic Gymnastics Championships in Ulaanbaatar, Mongolia, winning gold medals in both the team event and the Horizontal bar final and winning silver in the all-around and parallel bar finals. At the 2021 World Artistic Gymnastics Championships, he qualified in third for the parallel bars event and second for the horizontal bar event. He went on to win both the Parallel Bar final and the Horizontal Bar final; becoming the first athlete to hold both bar titles in a single World Championship since Boris Shakhlin in the 1958 World Artistic Gymnastics Championships.
