= Yeo Seo-jeong =

South Korean artistic gymnast

- 여서정
- Born: 20 February 2002 (age 24) Yongin-si, South Korea
- Height: 1.51 m (4 ft 11 in)
- Relatives: Yeo Hong-chul (father)

Gymnastics career
- Discipline: Women's artistic gymnastics
- Country represented: South Korea; (2018–present)
- Club: Jecheon City Hall
- Head coach: Lee Kwang-Yeon
- Eponymous skills: Yeo (5.8) (vault): handspring layout double twist
Medal record
Representing South Korea
Women's artistic gymnastics
Olympic Games
Bronze medal – third place	2020 Tokyo	Vault
World Championships
Bronze medal – third place	2023 Antwerp	Vault
Asian Games
Gold medal – first place	2018 Jakarta	Vault
Gold medal – first place	2026 Aichi-Nagoya	Vault
Asian Championships
Gold medal – first place	2022 Doha	Vault
Gold medal – first place	2023 Singapore	Vault
Gold medal – first place	2026 Zunyi	Vault
Silver medal – second place	2022 Doha	Team
Silver medal – second place	2023 Singapore	Team
Bronze medal – third place	2026 Zunyi	Team
FIG World Cup
Event	1st	2nd	3rd
Apparatus World Cup	1	0	0
World Challenge Cup	1	0	0
Total	2	0	0

Yeo Seo-jeong (Korean: 여서정; born 20 February 2002) is a South Korean artistic gymnast. She is the 2020 Olympic bronze medalist, the 2023 World bronze medalist, the 2018 and 2026 Asian Games champion, and a three-time Asian champion on vault. She is the first South Korean female gymnast to win an Olympic medal and also the first to win a World Championships medal.

== Early life ==
Yeo Seo-jeong was born on 20 February 2002 in Yongin-si. Both of Yeo's parents are retired gymnasts. Her mother won a team bronze medal in the 1994 Asian Games, and her father, Yeo Hong-chul, was the 1996 Olympic silver medalist on vault. She said in 2018 that she enjoys vault because of her father. She graduated from Gyeonggi Physical Education High School.

== Career ==
=== 2018 ===
Yeo won the all-around title at the South Korean National Championships. Then, she made her senior international debut at the Guimaraes World Challenge Cup and won the gold medal on vault. She was then selected to compete at the 2018 Asian Games alongside Ham Mi-ju, Kim Ju-ry, Lee Eun-ju, and Yun Na-rae. The team finished in fourth place. Individually, Yeo won the gold medal on vault, and she placed ninth in the all-around, eighth on beam, and seventh on floor. She then competed at the World Championships where she placed fifth in the vault final. Her final meet of the season was the Voronin Cup where she won vault gold, all-around silver, and floor exercise bronze, and she placed eighth on the uneven bars and balance beam.

=== 2019 ===
Yeo won the gold medal on the vault at the Melbourne World Cup. This was the first time that a Korean female gymnast won a gold medal in the FIG World Cup series. She placed fourth in the all-around at the Korean National Team Selection meet. At the 2019 Korea Cup, Yeo became the first woman to land the handspring double twist vault. She said of the new vault, "I was afraid, but once I started focusing on the competition, my fear disappeared. I am so happy that I was able to execute that. I wanted to land the new vault regardless of my final rankings today, and everything went my way." The vault was then named after her and added to the Code of Points.

At the World Championships in Stuttgart, Yeo qualified to the vault final in fifth place with a score of 14.766. However, she finished last in the final after a fall and going out of bounds when attempting the handspring double twist vault. Because she qualified for the vault event final, Yeo qualified as an individual for the 2020 Olympic Games. After the World Championships, she competed at the Arthur Gander Memorial and placed ninth in the all-around. She also competed at the Swiss Cup alongside Lee Jun-ho, and they finished seventh as a team.

=== 2021–2022 ===
At the 2020 Olympic Games, Yeo competed in the vault final and performed her eponymous vault, which had the highest difficulty value in the final. She finished with an average score of 14.733 and won the bronze medal behind Brazilian Rebeca Andrade and American MyKayla Skinner. This made her the first South Korean female gymnast to win an Olympic medal.

Yeo competed at the 2022 Asian Championships in June. While there, she helped South Korea finish second as a team behind China. Individually, she won gold on the vault and placed fifth in the all-around and on the floor exercise. She then competed at the 2022 World Championships and placed seventh in the vault final.

=== 2023 ===
Yeo competed at the 2023 City of Jesolo Trophy, helping South Korea win the team silver medal behind Italy. Individually, she won the gold medal on the vault and the silver medal on the balance beam. She then won the bronze medal in the all-around at the South Korean Championships. Then at the 2023 Asian Championships, she helped South Korea win the silver medal behind China. Individually, Yeo successfully defended her vault title.

Yeo competed at the World Championships where she helped Korea place 11th as a team during qualifications. In doing so, Korea qualified a full team to compete at the 2024 Olympic Games. Individually Yeo qualified for the vault final. During the final, Yeo performed two clean vaults and won the bronze medal behind Rebeca Andrade of Brazil and American Simone Biles. This was the first World Championships medal won by a female South Korean gymnast.

=== 2024 ===
Yeo won the bronze medal in the all-around at the Korean National Team Selection competition, leading to her selection for the 2024 Summer Olympics team alongside Eom Do-hyun, Lee Da-yeong, Lee Yun-seo, and Shin Sol-yi. South Korea placed twelfth in the team competition. Individually, Yeo qualified to the vault final, where she ultimately finished seventh.

=== 2025 ===
Yeo competed only domestically in 2025. At the Korean National Sports Festival in September 2025, she qualified for the uneven bars final, finishing in fourth place. In November 2025, she participated in a National Team selection event, though she only competed on uneven bars and balance beam, finishing sixth on each.

=== 2026 ===
In April 2026, Yeo resumed competing in the all-around. Competing in the senior women's division at the 2026 South Korean Championships, she won the gold medal in the individual all-around, as well as on vault and balance beam. She also took second place on floor exercise and third on uneven bars. Yeo also participated in the final National Team selection competition for 2026, held in May. She received the highest scores on vault and floor exercise during both days of trials.

Yeo was selected to compete at the 2026 Asian Championships where she helped South Korea win bronze as a team. Individually she finished sixth in the all-around and qualified to the vault and floor exercise event finals. During event finals she won her third Asian title on vault and finished sixth on floor exercise.

== Eponymous skills ==
Yeo has one eponymous skill listed in the Code of Points.

Apparatus	Name	Description	Difficulty (Note: Valid for the 2025–2028 Code of Points)	Added to Code of Points
Vault	Yeo	Handspring forward on – stretched salto forward with 2/1 turn (720°) off	5.8	2019 Korea Cup

== Competitive history ==
Competitive history of Yeo Seo-jeong
Year	Event	Team	AA	VT	UB	BB	FX
2018	South Korean Championships		1st place, gold medalist(s)				
2018	Guimaraes World Challenge Cup			1st place, gold medalist(s)			
2018	Asian Games	4	9	1st place, gold medalist(s)		8	7
2018	World Championships			5			
2018	Voronin Cup		2nd place, silver medalist(s)	1st place, gold medalist(s)	8	8	3rd place, bronze medalist(s)
2019	Melbourne World Cup			1st place, gold medalist(s)			
2019	Korean National Team Selection		4				
2019	Korea Cup			1st place, gold medalist(s)		2nd place, silver medalist(s)	
2019	World Championships			8			
2019	Arthur Gander Memorial		9				
2019	Swiss Cup	7					
2021
2021	Olympic Games			3rd place, bronze medalist(s)			
2022
2022	Asian Championships	2nd place, silver medalist(s)	5	1st place, gold medalist(s)			5
2022	World Championships			7			
2023	City of Jesolo Trophy	2nd place, silver medalist(s)		1st place, gold medalist(s)		2nd place, silver medalist(s)	8
2023	South Korean Championships		3rd place, bronze medalist(s)				
2023	Asian Championships	2nd place, silver medalist(s)		1st place, gold medalist(s)			
2023	World Championships	11		3rd place, bronze medalist(s)			
2024	Korean National Team Selection		3rd place, bronze medalist(s)				
2024	Olympic Games	12		7			
2025	Korean National Sports Festival				4		
2025	Korean National Team Selection				6	6	
2026	South Korean Championships		1st place, gold medalist(s)	1st place, gold medalist(s)	3rd place, bronze medalist(s)	1st place, gold medalist(s)	2nd place, silver medalist(s)
2026	Korean National Team Selection			1st place, gold medalist(s)			1st place, gold medalist(s)
2026	Asian Championships	3rd place, bronze medalist(s)	6	1st place, gold medalist(s)	R1		6
2026	Asian Games	4	6	1st place, gold medalist(s)	R2		7
2026	World Championships	17		7			
