= Lee Da-yeong (gymnast) =

South Korean artistic gymnast (born 2004)

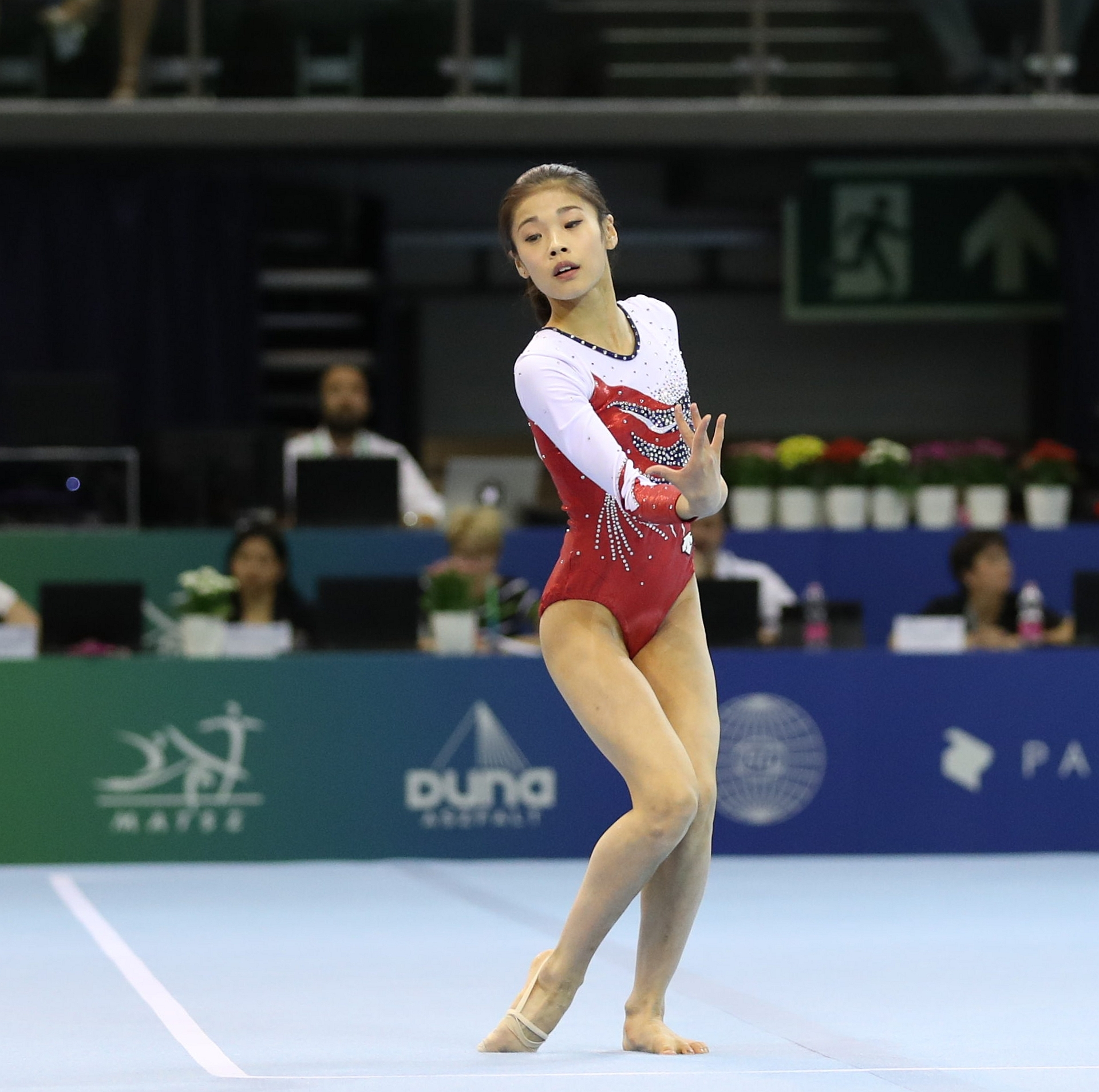
- Lee at the 2019 Junior World Championships

Personal information
- Born: 28 December 2004 (age 21) Seoul, South Korea

Gymnastics career
- Discipline: Women's artistic gymnastics
- Country represented: South Korea (2017–present)
- Club: Korea National Sport University
- Head coach: Lee Jeong-sik
Medal record
Representing South Korea
Asian Championships
Silver medal – second place	2022 Doha	Team
Silver medal – second place	2023 Singapore	Team

Lee Da-yeong (Korean: 이다영; born 28 December 2004) is a South Korean artistic gymnast. She has competed at three senior-level World Championships as well as the 2019 Junior World Championships. She was a member of the teams that won a silver medal at the 2022 and 2023 Asian Championships. She represented South Korea at the 2024 Summer Olympics.

== Junior gymnastics career ==
Lee made her international debut at the 2017 Asian Junior Championships and won a bronze medal with the South Korean team. She also competed at the 2018 Asian Junior Championships where the South Korean team won another bronze medal, and Lee finished eighth in the uneven bars final.

Lee finished seventh in the all-around at the 2019 Korean National Team Selection with the second-highest score on the uneven bars. She was then selected to compete at the 2019 Junior World Championships alongside Hyun Jin-ju and Shin Sol-yi, and the team placed 10th. Lee also placed 10th in the individual all-around.

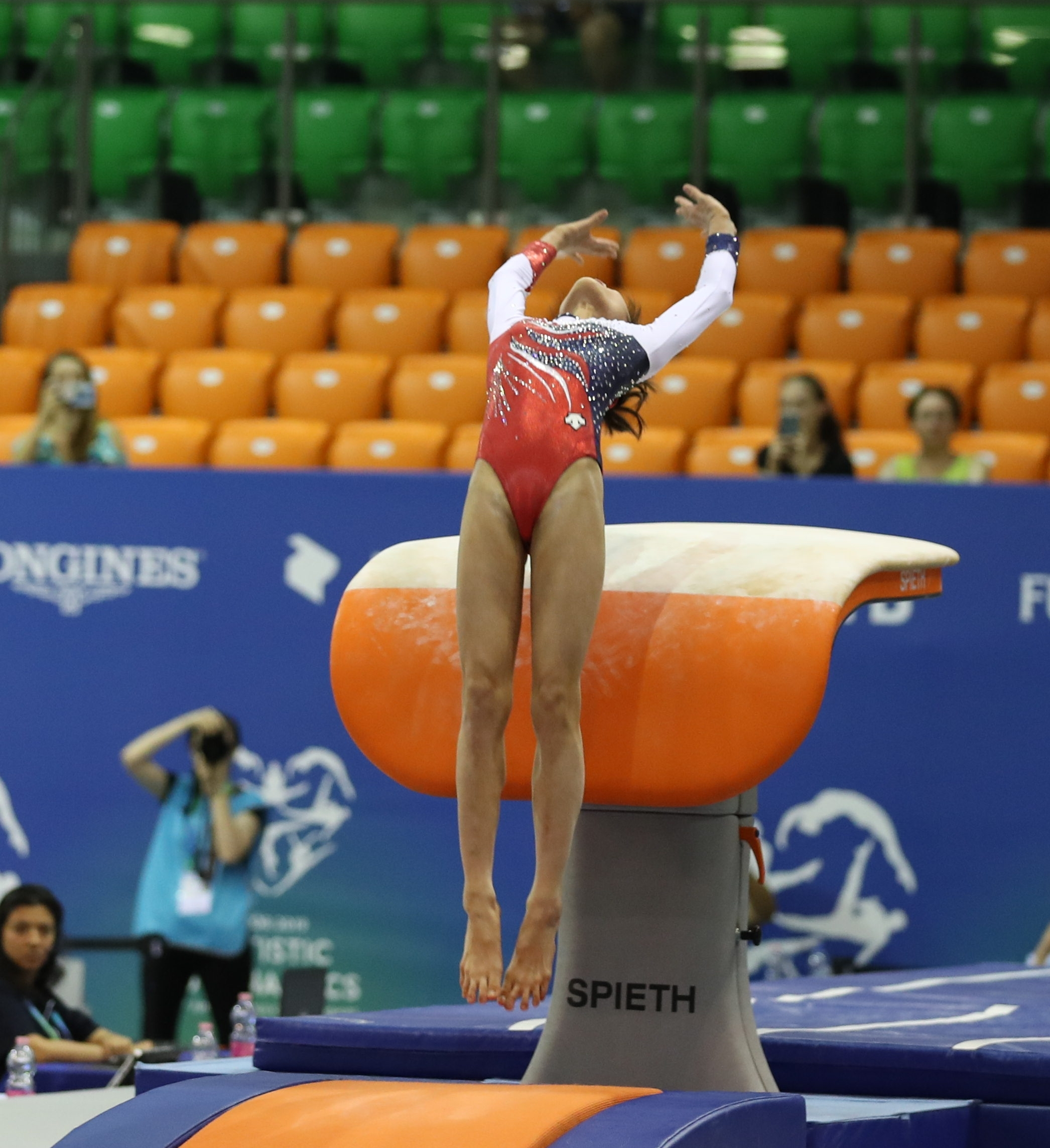
Vault

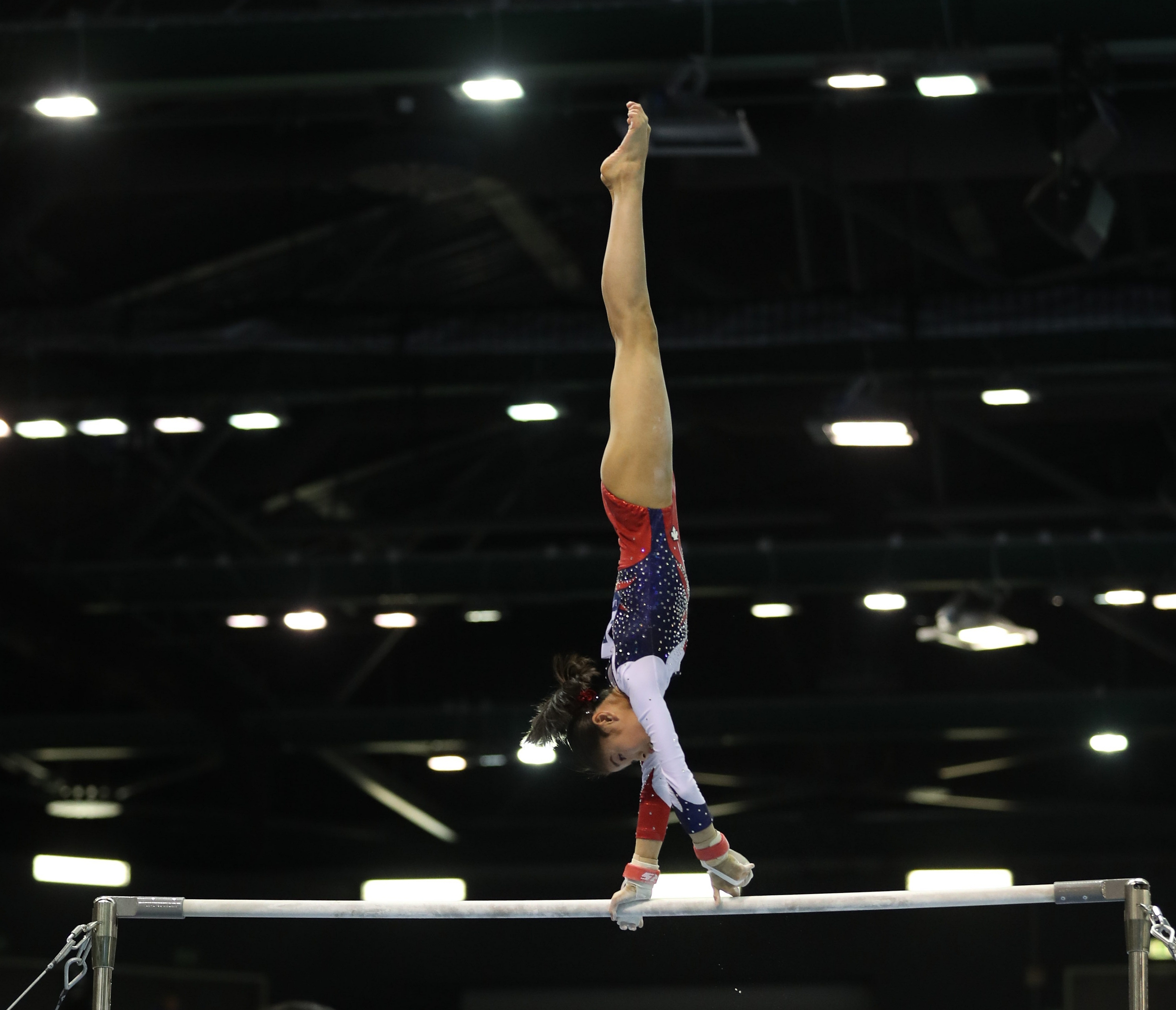
Uneven bars

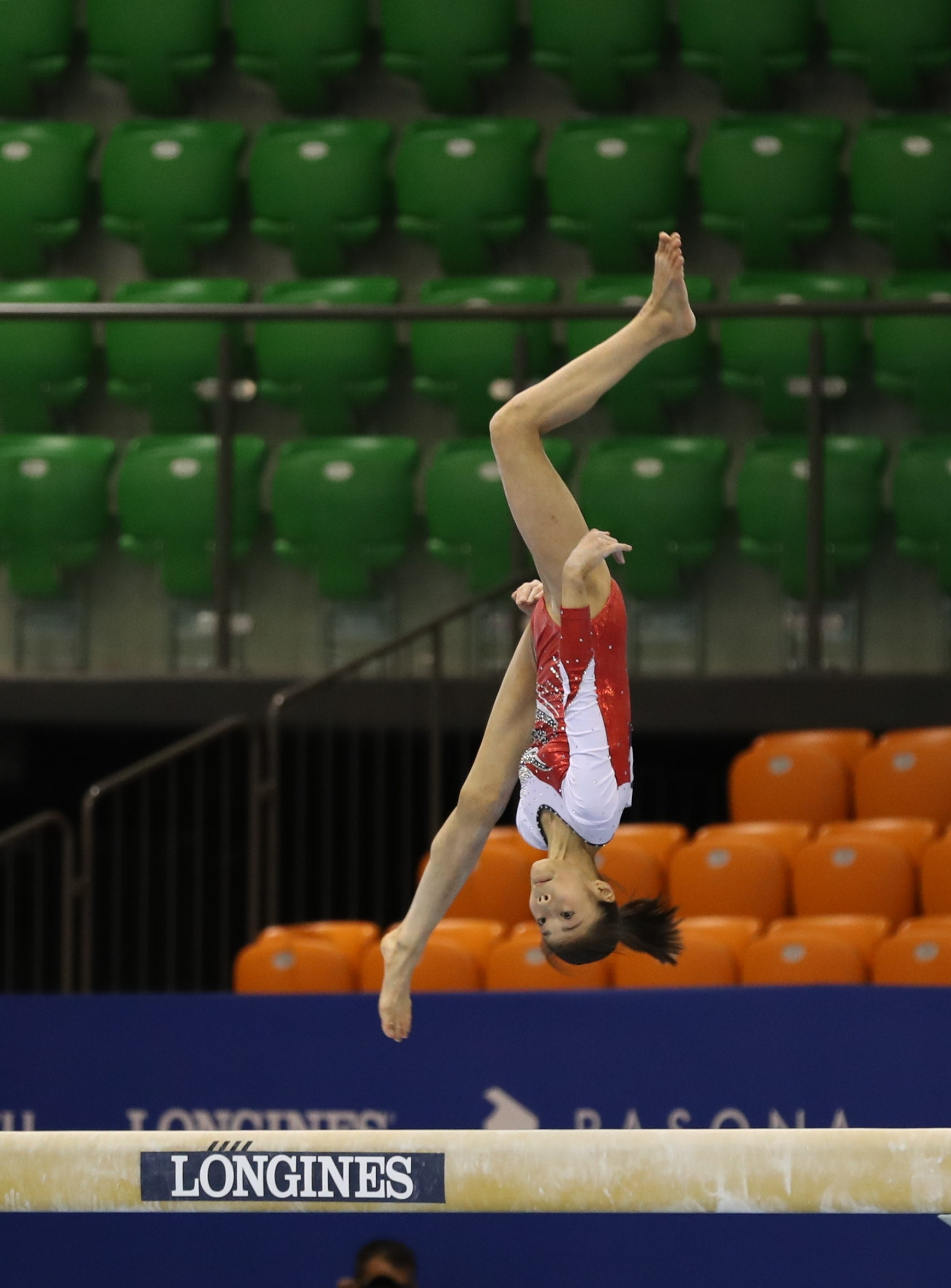
Balance beam

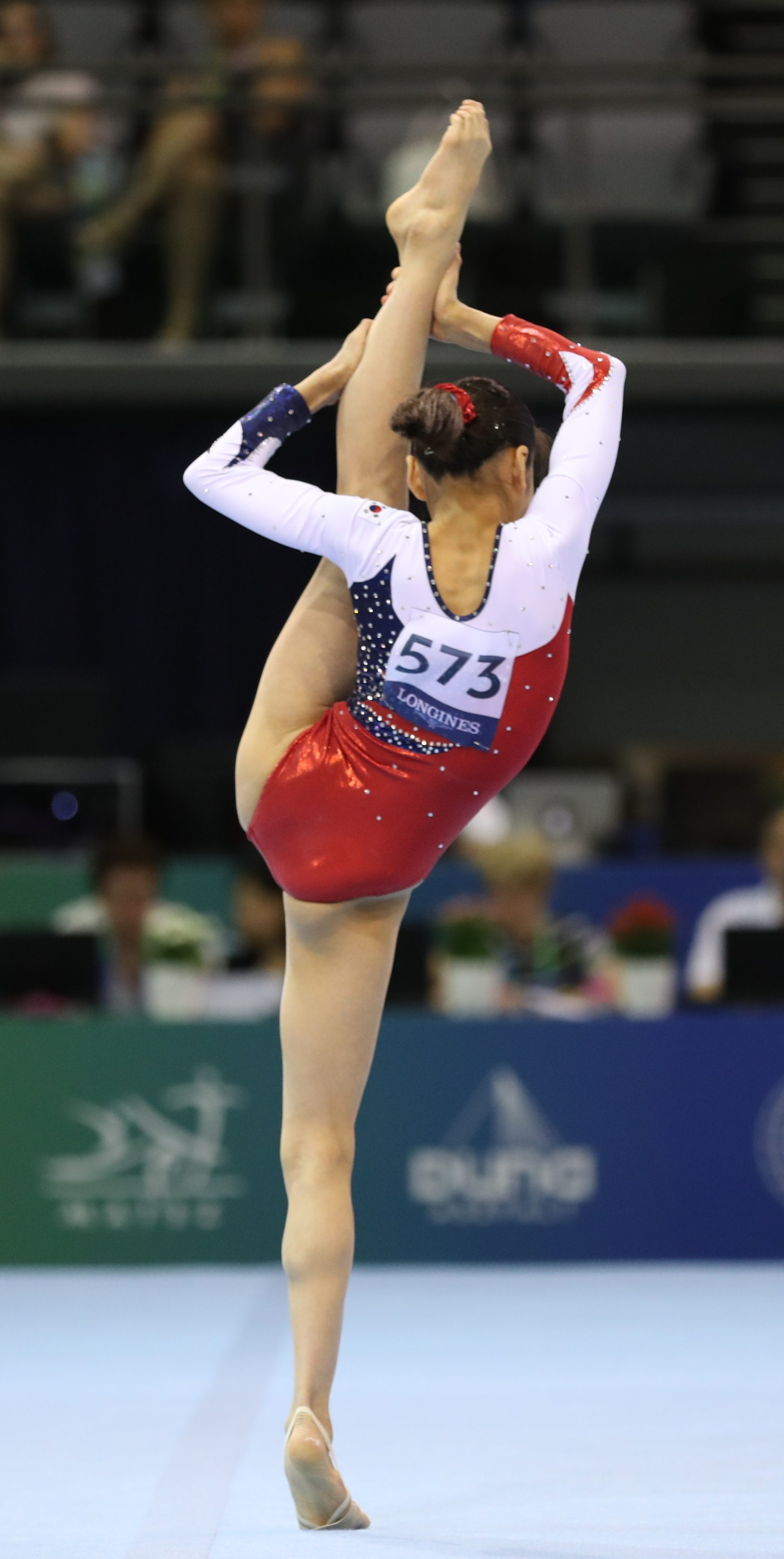
Floor exercise

Lee in qualifications at the 2019 Junior World Championships

== Senior gymnastics career ==
Lee became age-eligible for senior international competitions in 2020, but she did not compete due to the COVID-19 pandemic.

=== 2021–2022 ===
Lee returned to competition at the 2021 South Korean Championships where she won the all-around silver medal behind Shin Sol-yi. At the Korean National Sports Festival, she won the all-around bronze medal behind Lee Yun-seo and Shin. She also won bronze medals in the uneven bars and floor exercise finals. She then competed on the uneven bars and floor exercise at the 2021 World Championships but did not advance into the finals.

Lee competed at the 2022 Asian Championships and helped South Korea win a team silver medal behind China. She then competed with the South Korean team at the 2022 World Championships in Liverpool that placed 13th in the qualification round.

=== 2023–2024 ===
Lee helped South Korea win the team silver medal behind Italy at the 2023 City of Jesolo Trophy. Individually, she placed ninth in the all-around and fourth on the balance beam. She also won a silver medal on the floor exercise behind Spain's Laura Casabuena. Then at the 2023 Asian Championships, she helped South Korea win the silver medal behind China. She then represented South Korea at the World University Games, and the team finished in fifth place. Individually, Lee placed eighth in the all-around and sixth on both the balance beam and floor exercise. She competed at the 2023 World Championships alongside Yeo Seo-jeong, Shin Sol-yi, Lee Yun-seo, and Eom Do-hyun, and they placed 11th in the qualification round. With this result, South Korea earned a team berth for the 2024 Summer Olympics.

Lee won the silver medal in the all-around at the Korean National Team Selection competition, leading to her selection for the 2024 Summer Olympics team alongside Yeo Seo-jeong, Shin Sol-yi, Lee Yun-seo, and Eom Do-hyun. At the 2024 Olympics, she finished 72nd on uneven bars.

== Personal life ==
As of 2024, Lee is a student at Korea National Sport University.

== Competitive history ==
Competitive history of Lee Da-yeong at the junior level
Year	Event	Team	AA	VT	UB	BB	FX
2017
2017	Asian Junior Championships	3rd place, bronze medalist(s)					
2018
2018	Asian Junior Championships	3rd place, bronze medalist(s)			8		
2019	Korean National Team Selection		7				
2019	Junior World Championships	10	10				

Competitive history of Lee Da-yeong at the senior level
Year	Event	Team	AA	VT	UB	BB	FX
2021	South Korean Championships		3rd place, bronze medalist(s)				
2021	Korean National Sports Festival		3rd place, bronze medalist(s)		3rd place, bronze medalist(s)	4	3rd place, bronze medalist(s)
2021	World Championships				42		25
2022
2022	Asian Championships	2nd place, silver medalist(s)					
2022	World Championships	13					
2023	City of Jesolo Trophy	2nd place, silver medalist(s)	9			4	2nd place, silver medalist(s)
2023	Asian Championships	2nd place, silver medalist(s)					
2023	World University Games	5	9			6	6
2023	World Championships	11					
2024	Korean National Team Selection		2nd place, silver medalist(s)				
2024	Olympic Games	12					
