= Shin Sol-yi =

South Korean artistic gymnast

- 신솔이
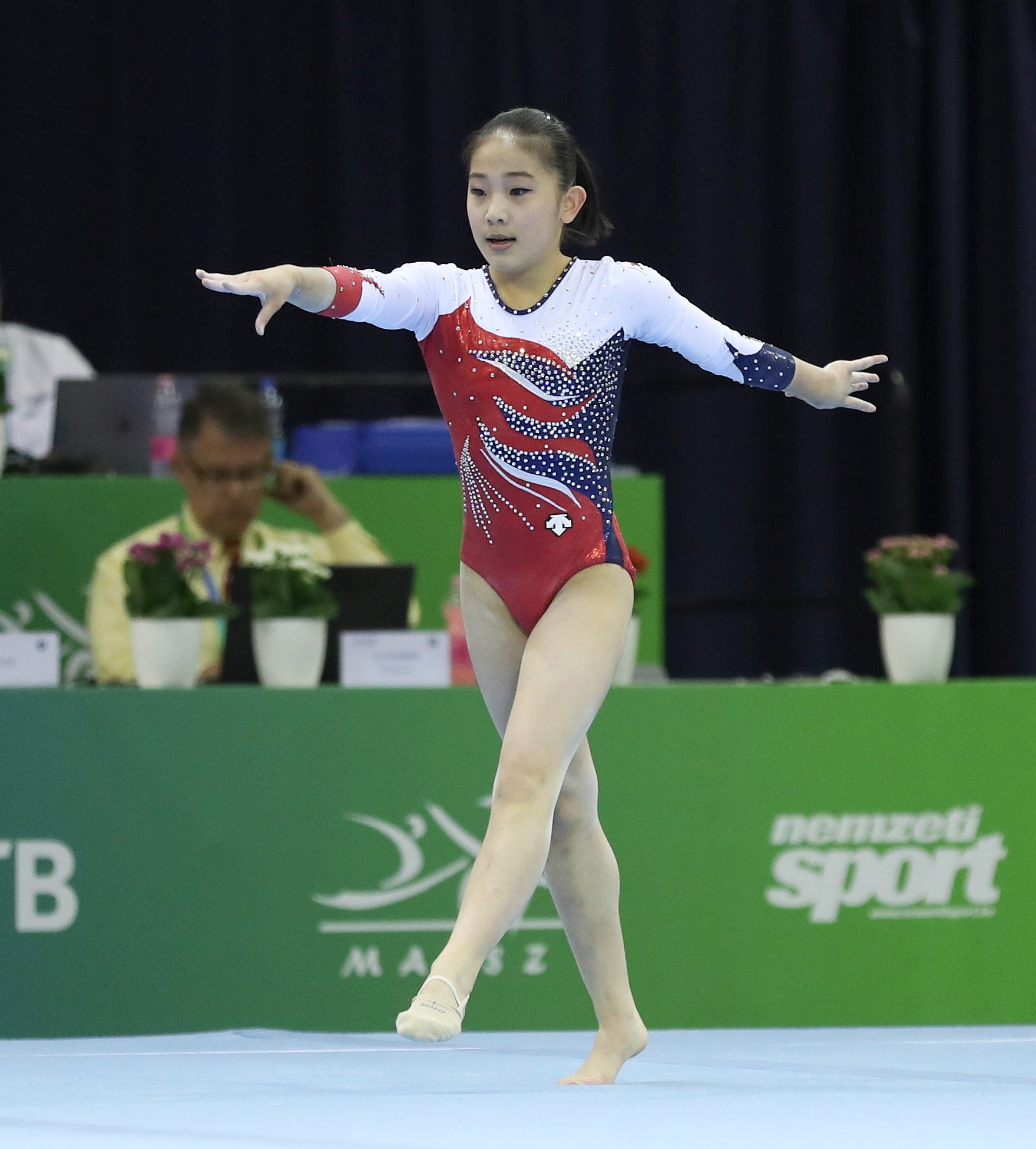
- Shin at the 2019 Junior World Championships

Personal information
- Full name: Shin Sol-yi
- Alternative name: Sin Sol-i
- Born: 14 July 2004 (age 22) Chungbuk, South Korea

Gymnastics career
- Discipline: Women's artistic gymnastics
- Country represented: South Korea
- Head coach: Lee Jeong-sik
- Former coach: Ahn Young-mi
Medal record
Representing South Korea
Asian Championships
Silver medal – second place	2022 Doha	Team
Silver medal – second place	2023 Singapore	Team
Bronze medal – third place	2023 Singapore	All-around
Bronze medal – third place	2023 Singapore	Floor Exercise

Shin Sol-yi (Korean: 신솔이; born 14 July 2004) is a South Korean artistic gymnast. She is the 2021 and 2023 South Korean national all-around champion. She finished 11th in the all-around at the 2021 World Championships, the highest-ever placement for a South Korean female gymnast. She is the 2023 Asian all-around and floor exercise bronze medalist. On the junior level, Shin is the 2017 Asian Junior Championships vault silver medalist. She represented South Korea at the 2024 Summer Olympics.

== Early life ==
Shin was born on 14 July 2004, in Chungbuk. She began gymnastics when she was in first grade at Namsan Primary School in Chungju. She graduated from Chungbuk Physical Education High School.

== Junior career ==
Shin competed at the 2017 Asian Junior Championships and won bronze with the Korean team. Individually, she finished seventh in the all-around and won silver on vault. She also competed in the uneven bars and floor exercise finals, finishing sixth and fourth, respectively. Shin won the all-around in the middle school division of the Ministry of Culture, Sports and Tourism meet. She then competed at the 2017 Junior Japan International, where she placed 11th in the all-around and qualified to the uneven bars final, finishing eighth.

In 2018, Shin again competed at the Asian Junior Championships and once again won bronze with the Korean team. She did not place in the all-around due to the two-per-country rule, but she qualified for the vault, uneven bars, and floor exercise finals, finishing sixth, fifth, and seventh, respectively. Shin won the middle school division of the Ministry of Culture, Sports and Tourism meet for a second consecutive year despite minor ankle and calf injuries.

Shin finished sixth in the all-around at a 2019 Korean national team selection event with the highest score of the competition on the balance beam. She was named to the Korean team for the inaugural World Junior Championships alongside Hyun Jin-ju and Lee Da-yeong. The team placed 10th, and Shin finished 29th in the all-around.

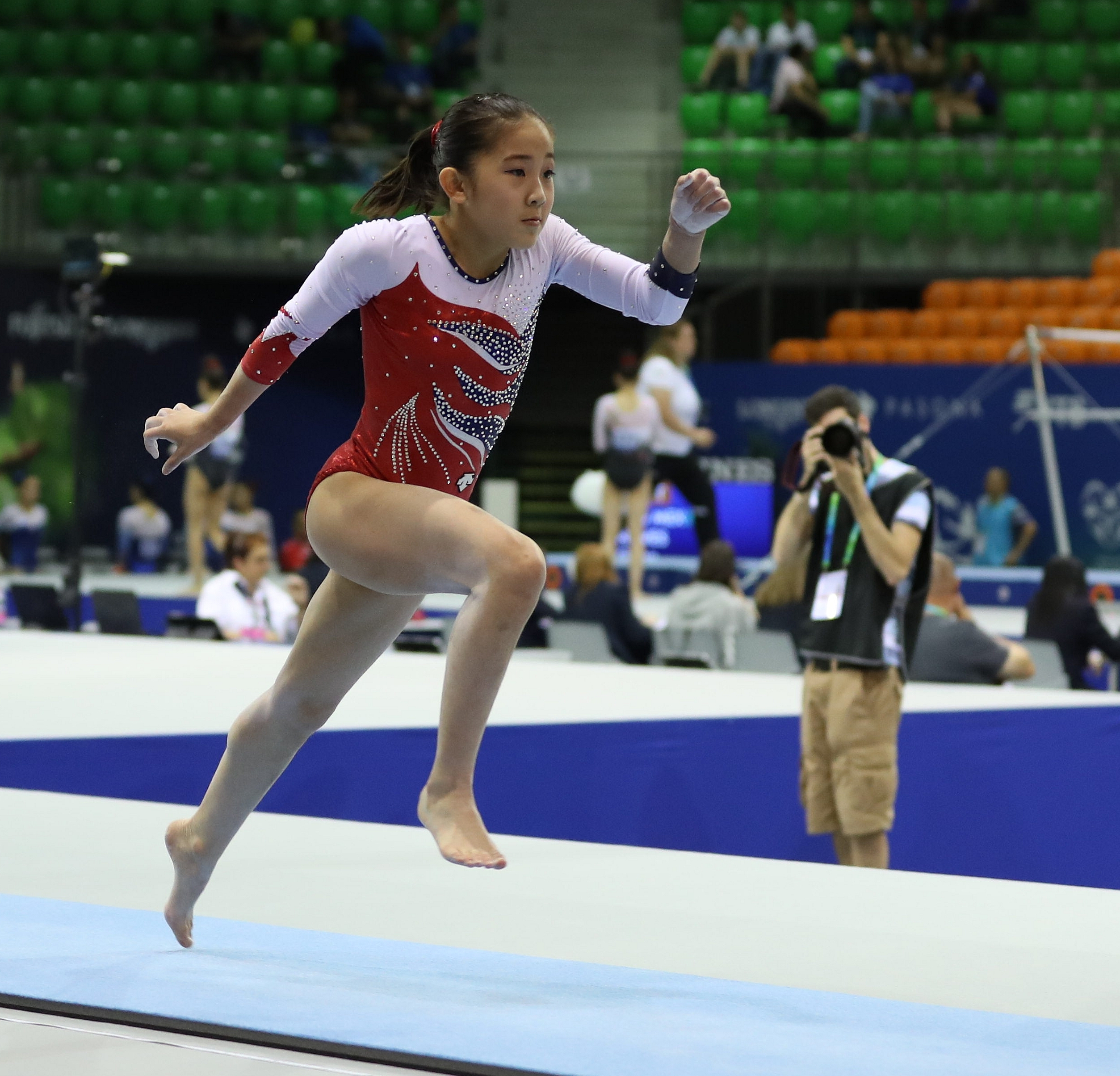
Vault

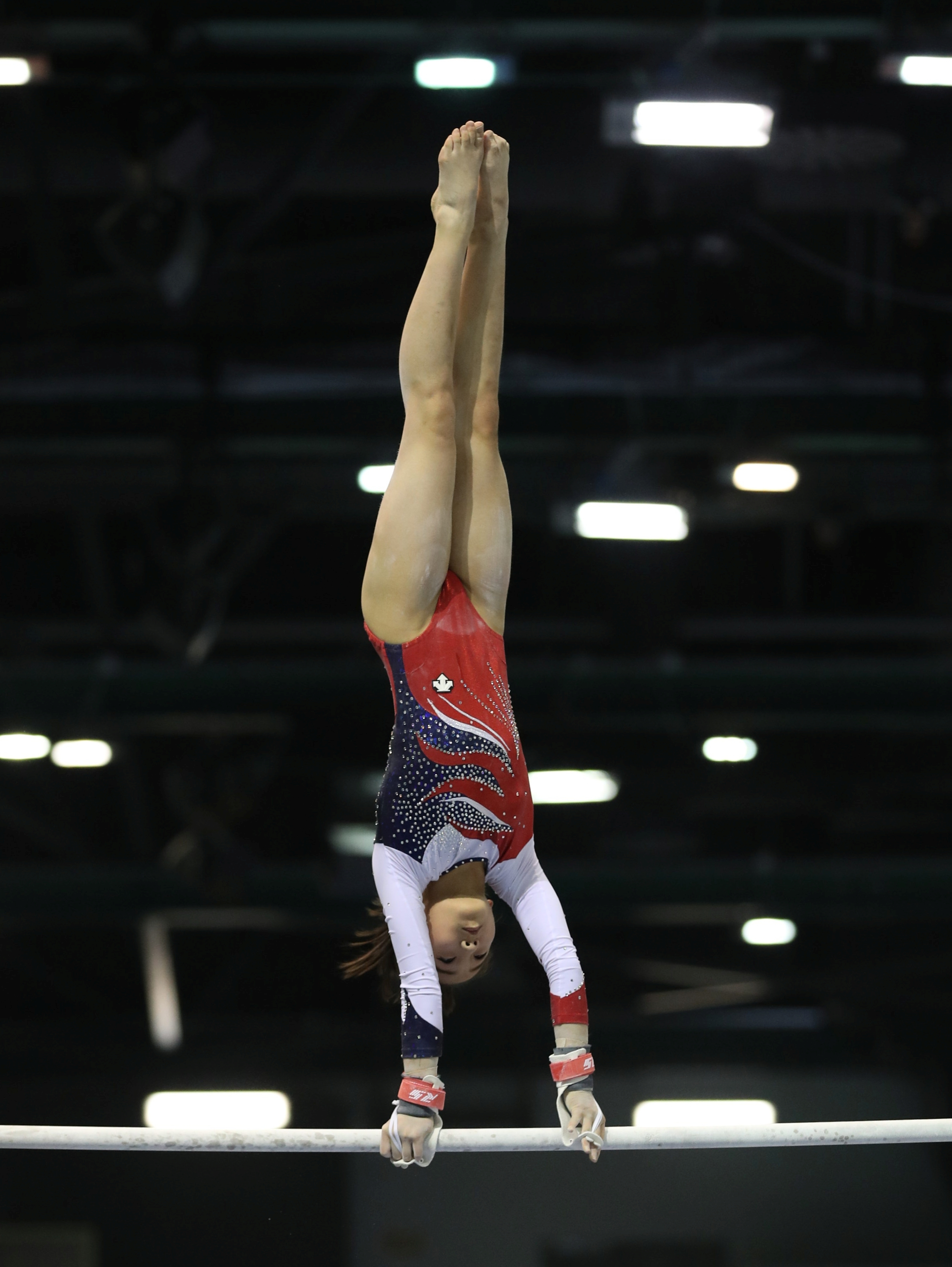
Uneven bars

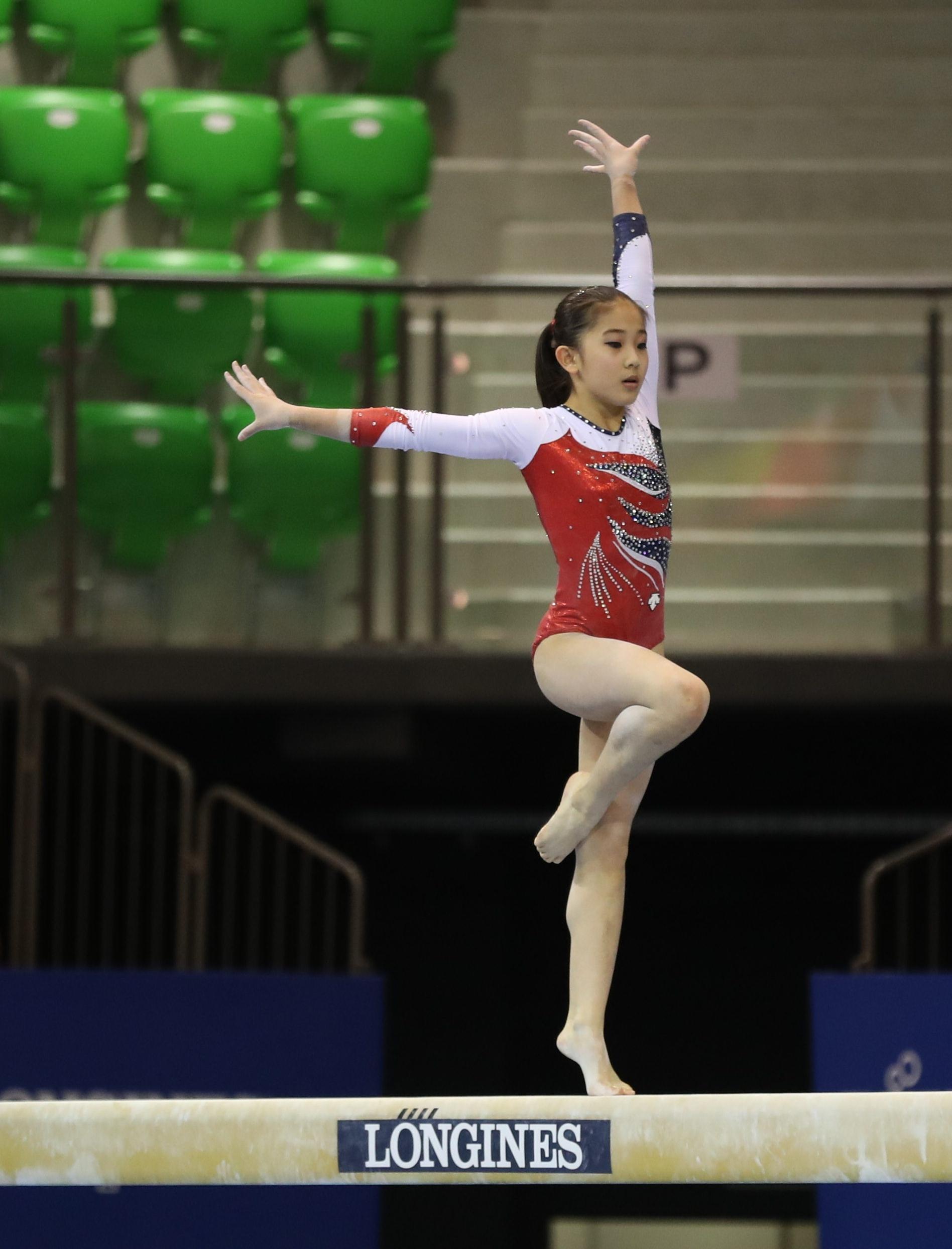
Balance beam

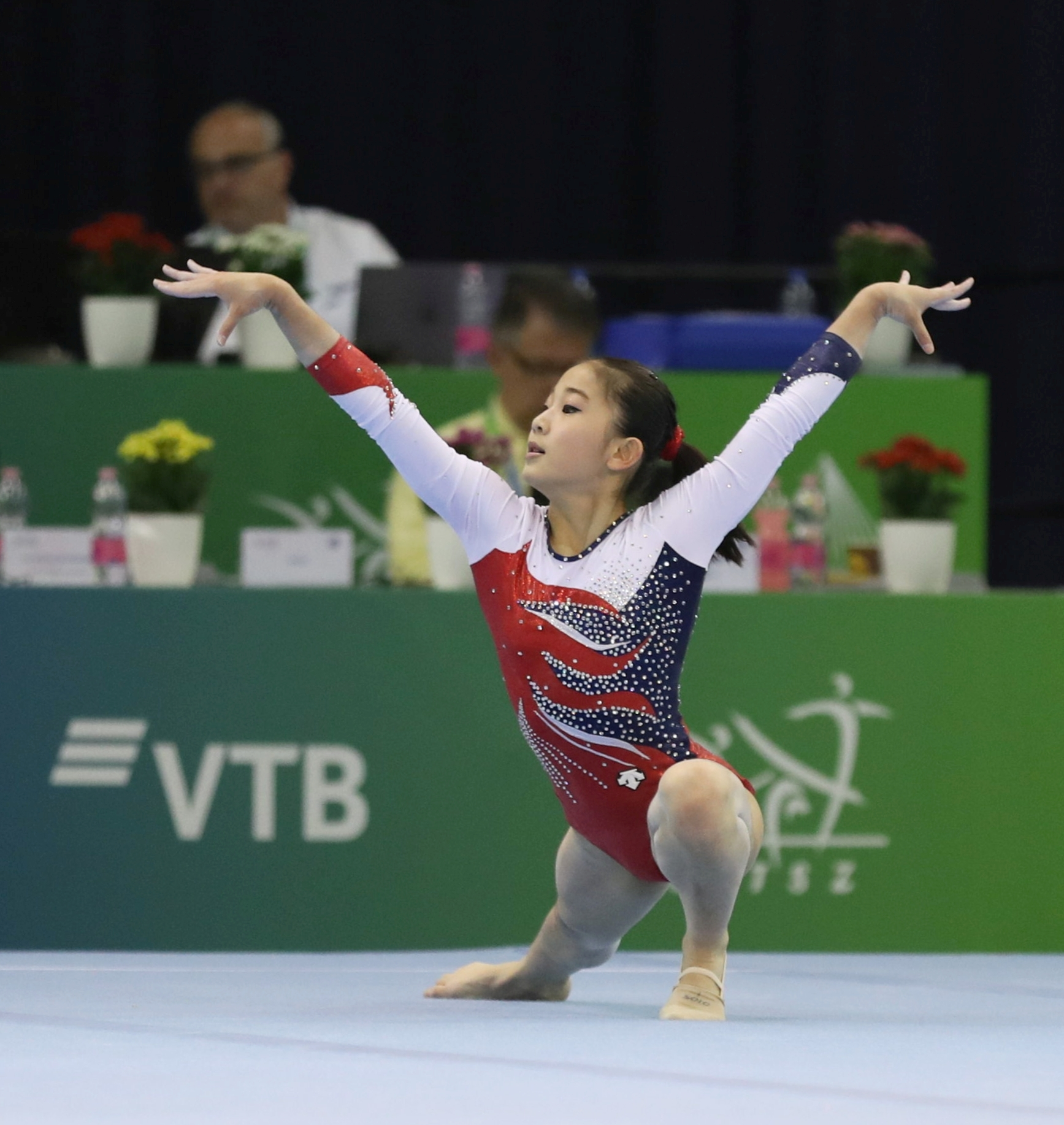
Floor exercise

Shin in qualifications at the 2019 Junior World Championships

== Senior career ==
Shin did not compete in 2020 due to the COVID-19 pandemic; it would have been her first senior international season.

=== 2021 ===
Shin won the all-around at the Korean national team selection meet at the end of April ahead of Eom Do-hyun and Yeo Seo-jeong. She won the South Korean Championships all-around title in early May with the highest score on every event except vault, where she had the second-highest score. She then competed at the Korean National Sports Festival where she won gold on the vault and floor exercise and silver in the all-around, uneven bars, and balance beam, all behind Lee Yun-seo.

Shin was named to the Korean delegation for the 2021 World Championships alongside Lee, Eom, and Lee Da-yeong. At the World Championships, Shin qualified in 14th for the individual all-around final and was first reserve for the floor exercise final. In the all-around final, she improved to 11th overall, besting Park Ji-suk's 18th-place finish in 1987 for the highest-ever placement for a South Korean female gymnast in World Championships history.

=== 2022 ===
Shin competed at the Asian Championships and helped South Korea finish second as a team behind China. She did not place in the all-around due to the two-per-country rule despite having the sixth-highest total score. She did qualify for the uneven bars and balance beam finals, finishing seventh and fifth, respectively. She then competed with the South Korean team at the World Championships in Liverpool that placed 13th in the qualification round.

=== 2023 ===
Shin competed at the City of Jesolo Trophy, helping South Korea win the team silver medal behind Italy. Individually, she placed 13th in the all-around, fifth in the vault final, and sixth in the uneven bars final. She then won the all-around title at the South Korean Championships. Then at the 2023 Asian Championships, she helped South Korea win the silver medal behind China. Individually, Shin won the all-around bronze medal behind Chinese gymnasts Qiu Qiyuan and Zhang Qingying. She then won the bronze medal in the floor exercise final behind Zhang and Emma Malabuyo. She also placed seventh in the vault final, fourth in the uneven bars final, and eighth in the balance beam final.

Shin competed at the 2023 World Championships alongside Yeo Seo-jeong, Lee Da-yeong, Lee Yun-seo, and Eom Do-hyun, and they placed 11th in the qualification round. With this result, South Korea earned a team berth for the 2024 Summer Olympics.

=== 2024 ===
Shin won the gold medal in the all-around at the Korean National Team Selection competition, leading to her selection for the 2024 Summer Olympics team alongside Eom Do-hyun, Lee Da-yeong, Lee Yun-seo, and Yeo Seo-jeong. At those Olympics, she placed 52 in the all-around, finishing 47th on uneven bars, 53rd on balance beam, and 50th in the floor exercise.

== Competitive history ==
Competitive history of Shin Sol-yi at the junior level
Year	Event	Team	AA	VT	UB	BB	FX
2017
2017	Asian Junior Championships	3rd place, bronze medalist(s)	7	2nd place, silver medalist(s)	6		4
2017	Japan Junior International		11		8		
2018
2018	Asian Junior Championships	3rd place, bronze medalist(s)		6		5	7
2019	Korean National Team Selection		6				
2019	World Junior Championships	10	29				

Competitive history of Shin Sol-yi at the senior level
Year	Event	Team	AA	VT	UB	BB	FX
2021	Korean National Team Selection		1st place, gold medalist(s)				
2021	South Korean Championships		1st place, gold medalist(s)				
2021	Korean National Sports Festival		2nd place, silver medalist(s)	1st place, gold medalist(s)	2nd place, silver medalist(s)	2nd place, silver medalist(s)	1st place, gold medalist(s)
2021	World Championships		11				R1
2022
2022	Asian Championships	2nd place, silver medalist(s)			7	5	
2022	World Championships	13					
2023	City of Jesolo Trophy	2nd place, silver medalist(s)	13	5	6		
2023	South Korean Championships		1st place, gold medalist(s)				
2023	Asian Championships	2nd place, silver medalist(s)	3rd place, bronze medalist(s)	7	4	8	3rd place, bronze medalist(s)
2023	World Championships	11					
2024	Korean National Team Selection		1st place, gold medalist(s)				
2024	Olympic Games	12					
2025	South Korean Championships		1st place, gold medalist(s)		1st place, gold medalist(s)	1st place, gold medalist(s)	1st place, gold medalist(s)
2025	World University Games	4	7				
2026
2026	Asian Games						
