= Lee Jeong-sik (gymnast) =

South Korean gymnast

- 이정식
- Alternative name: Lee Jeoung-sik
- Born: 17 August 1963 (age 63)
- Height: 1.68 m (5 ft 6 in)

Gymnastics career
- Discipline: Men's artistic gymnastics
- Country represented: South Korea
Medal record
Representing Republic of Korea
Asian Games
Silver medal – second place	1986 Seoul	Team

Lee Jeong-sik (born 17 August 1963) is a South Korean gymnast. He competed in eight events at the 1984 Summer Olympics.

== Sports links ==
- This article has no link in Wikidata
