= Ting Hua-tien =

Taiwanese artistic gymnast

Ting Hua-tien 丁華恬
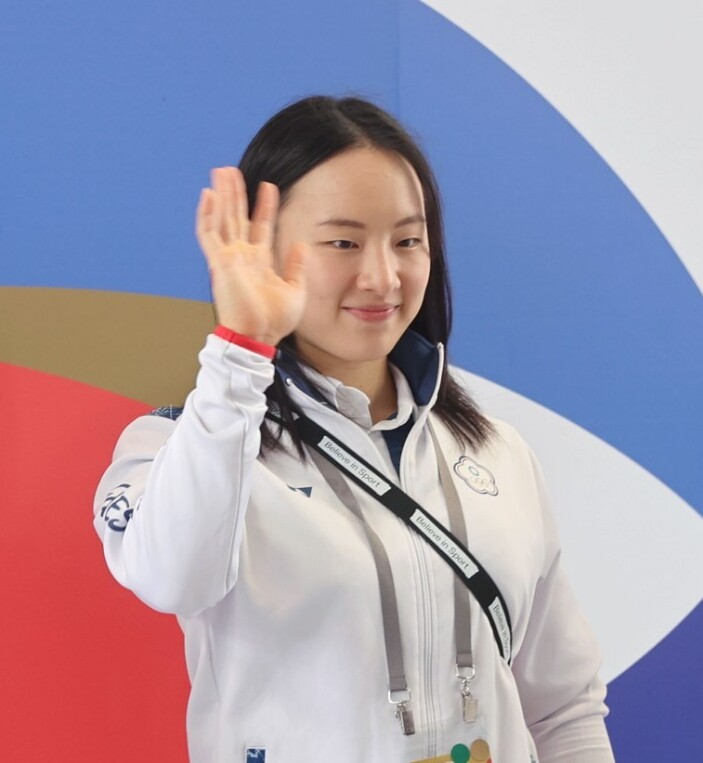
- Ting in 2024

Personal information
- Nickname: Tien Tien
- Born: 11 October 2002 (age 23) Taipei, Taiwan
- Height: 1.54 m (5 ft 1 in)

Gymnastics career
- Discipline: Women's artistic gymnastics
- Country represented: Chinese Taipei
- College team: Fu Jen Catholic University
- Training location: New Taipei City, Taiwan
- Head coach: Tsai Heng-Cheng
Medal record
Artistic gymnastics
Representing Chinese Taipei
Asian Games
Bronze medal – third place	2022 Hangzhou	Balance beam
Asian Championships
Gold medal – first place	2019 Ulaanbaatar	Balance beam
Bronze medal – third place	2023 Singapore	Team

Ting Hua-tien (born 11 October 2002) is a Taiwanese artistic gymnast. She is the 2019 Asian champion and the 2022 Asian Games bronze medalist on the balance beam. She competed at the 2020 Olympic Games, making her the first Taiwanese female gymnast to compete at an Olympic Games since 1968. Additionally she represented Chinese Taipei at the 2024 Summer Olympics.

== Early life ==
Ting was born on 11 October 2002 in Taipei. She first tried gymnastics at a summer camp when she was four years old.

== Career ==
=== 2016–2017: Junior career ===
Ting made her international debut at the 2016 Gymnasiade and helped the Taiwanese team finish fourth behind Brazil, Romania, and Turkey. In May 2017, she competed at the Asian Junior Championships, placing 12th in the all-around and seventh on the balance beam. She also helped the Taiwanese team finish sixth.

=== 2018–2019 ===
Ting became age-eligible for senior competitions in 2018, making her senior debut at the Gymnasiade in Rabat, Morocco, and placing 16th in the all-around. Later that year, she competed at the 2018 World Championships in Doha, Qatar, where she placed 66th all-around during the qualification round. Her best event result was on the balance beam where she placed tenth, making her the second reserve for the event final.

Ting opened her 2019 season at the Melbourne World Cup where she made the uneven bars and floor exercise finals, finishing seventh and eighth, respectively. At the World Cup, Ting submitted an original element, a split leap to ring position with a half turn on floor exercise, which was named after her in the Code of Points after she successfully performed it in qualifications. She is the first Taiwanese gymnast to get a skill named after them in the Code. Ting went on to compete at the Baku World Cup, where she did not reach the finals, and the Doha World Cup, where she placed sixth on the balance beam. In June, Ting competed at the Asian Championships where she placed seventh in the all-around, sixth on the uneven bars, seventh on floor exercise, and she won the gold medal on the balance beam. At the World Championships, Ting finished 88th all-around in qualifications, earning a berth for the 2020 Summer Olympics. She became the first Taiwanese female gymnast to qualify for the Olympic Games since 1968.

=== 2020–2021 ===
In August 2020, Ting competed at the Taiwan Test Event, a multisport event organized for Taiwanese athletes in place of the postponed Tokyo Olympics. She won the gold medal on the balance beam and the silver medals in the all-around, vault, and uneven bars.

At the 2020 Summer Olympics, Ting competed on the uneven bars and the balance beam during qualifications, placing 63rd and 50th respectively. She did not advance to the finals. She then competed at the 2021 World Championships and finished 30th in the all-around during the qualification round.

=== 2022–2023 ===
At the 2022 Asian Championships, Ting helped the Taiwanese team place fourth and qualify as a full team for the World Championships. Individually, Ting qualified for the uneven bars final and finished eighth. Then at the World Championships, she helped the Taiwanese team place 21st in the qualification round. Ting placed 13th on the balance beam and was the third reserve for the event final.

Ting began the 2023 season at the Cottbus World Cup where she finished fourth on the balance beam. Then at the Baku World Cup, she finished seventh on the balance beam. She helped the Taiwanese team win the bronze medal at the Asian Championships, and she finished seventh in the uneven bars event final. She then competed at the World University Games and finished 15th in the all-around final. At the Asian Games, she finished fifth in the all-around and won the bronze medal on the balance beam. She helped the Taiwanese team place 23rd at the 2023 World Championships.

=== 2024 ===
Ting registered for the 2024 FIG World Cup series to compete for an Olympic berth on the balance beam. The only competition where she qualified for the final was Baku, where she finished in sixth place. However, Ting still earned enough Olympic qualification points to earn the second balance beam quota for the 2024 Olympic Games. She placed 50th overall on the balance beam at the 2024 Olympic games.

== Eponymous skill ==
Ting has one eponymous skill listed in the Code of Points. She is the first Taiwanese gymnast to have an eponymous skill.

Apparatus	Name	Description	Difficulty (Note: Valid for the 2025–2028 Code of Points)	Added to the Code
Floor exercise	Ting	Split leap to ring position with ½ turn (180°)	D (0.4)	2019 Melbourne World Cup

== Competitive history ==
Year	Event	Team	AA	VT	UB	BB	FX
Junior
2016	Gymnasiade	4					
2017
2017	Junior Asian Championships	6	12			7	
Senior
2018	Gymnasiade	7	16				
2018	World Championships	33	66			R2	
2019	Melbourne World Cup				7		8
2019	Doha World Cup					6	
2019	Asian Championships	4	7		6	1st place, gold medalist(s)	7
2019	World Championships		88				
2020	Taiwan Test Event		2nd place, silver medalist(s)	2nd place, silver medalist(s)	2nd place, silver medalist(s)	1st place, gold medalist(s)	
2021
2021	Olympic Games				63	50	
2021	World Championships		30				
2022
2022	Asian Championships	4			8		
2022	World Championships	21				R3	
2023	Cottbus World Cup					4	
2023	Baku World Cup					7	
2023	Asian Championships	3rd place, bronze medalist(s)			7		
2023	World University Games	4	15				
2023	Asian Games	4	5			3rd place, bronze medalist(s)	
2023	World Championships	23					
2024	Baku World Cup					6	
2024	Olympic Games					50	
2025	World University Games	6					
2026
2026	Asian Games						
