= Gymnastics at the 2020 Summer Olympics – Women's vault =

Olympic gymnastics event

Women's vault at the Games of the XXXII Olympiad
- Olympic artistic gymnastics
- Venue: Ariake Gymnastics Centre
- Dates: 25 July 2021 (qualifying); 1 August 2021 (final)
- Competitors: 8 from 6 nations
- Winning score: 15.083 points

Medalists
1st place, gold medalist(s)		Rebeca Andrade	Brazil
2nd place, silver medalist(s)		MyKayla Skinner	United States
3rd place, bronze medalist(s)		Yeo Seo-jeong	South Korea

The women's vault event at the 2020 Summer Olympics was held on 25 July and 1 August 2021 at the Ariake Gymnastics Centre. Unlike the other apparatus events, vault requires gymnasts to perform two exercises in order for results to count towards the vault final; most of the gymnasts perform only one (if they are participating in team or individual all-around) or none (if they are only participating in other apparatus). Approximately 20 gymnasts from 15 nations (of the 98 total gymnasts) competed two vaults in the qualifying round.

Rebeca Andrade of Brazil won the event for her second individual medal of the 2020 Olympics. Andrade's medal is the first gold for Brazil in women's artistic gymnastics. MyKayla Skinner of the United States earned the silver medal after originally being excluded by the two-per-country rule. South Korea's Yeo Seo-jeong finished with the bronze to earn South Korea's first medal in women's artistic gymnastics.

The medals for the competition were presented by Nawal El Moutawakel, Morocco; IOC Executive Board Member, and the medalists' bouquets were presented by Jesus Carballo, Spain; FIG Executive Committee Member.

== Background ==
This was the 19th appearance of the event, after making its debut at the 1952 Summer Olympics. Defending champion Simone Biles of the United States was aiming to become the first woman to defend their Olympic title since Věra Čáslavská did so in 1964 and 1968. However, Biles announced her withdrawal on 30 July due to mental health reasons, following earlier withdrawals from the team and individual all-around finals. She was replaced in the final by teammate MyKayla Skinner, who had previously been excluded due to the two-per-country rule.

== Qualification ==
A National Olympic Committee (NOC) could enter up to 6 qualified gymnasts: a team of 4 and up to 2 specialists. A total of 98 quota places are allocated to women's gymnastics.

The 12 teams that qualify will be able to send 4 gymnasts in the team competition, for a total of 48 of the 98 quota places. The top three teams at the 2018 World Artistic Gymnastics Championships (the United States, Russia, and China) and the top nine teams (excluding those already qualified) at the 2019 World Artistic Gymnastics Championships (France, Canada, the Netherlands, Great Britain, Italy, Germany, Belgium, Japan, and Spain) earned team qualification places.

The remaining 50 quota places are awarded individually. Each gymnast can only earn one place, except that gymnasts that competed with a team that qualified are eligible to earn a second place through the 2020 All Around World Cup Series. Some of the individual events are open to gymnasts from NOCs with qualified teams, while others are not. These places are filled through various criteria based on the 2019 World Championships, the 2020 FIG Artistic Gymnastics World Cup series, continental championships, a host guarantee, and a Tripartite Commission invitation.

Each of the 98 qualified gymnasts are eligible for the vault competition, but due to the requirement that the gymnast perform two vault exercises in the qualifying round (rather than the one needed to count for team and individual all-around events), many gymnasts do not attempt to qualify for the vault final.

The COVID-19 pandemic delayed many of the events for qualifying for gymnastics. The 2018 and 2019 World Championships were completed on time, but many of the World Cup series events were delayed into 2021.

== Competition format ==
The top 8 qualifiers in the qualification phase (limit two per NOC) advanced to the apparatus final. For the vault, only gymnasts who performed two exercises on the vault were considered for the final; the average score of the two exercises was counted. The finalists again performed two vaults. Qualification scores were then ignored, with only final round scores (average of the two exercises) counting.

== Schedule ==
The competition was held over two days, 25 July and 1 August. The qualifying round (for all women's gymnastics events) was the first day with the vault final on the first day of individual event finals.

Date	Time	Round	Subdivision
25 July	10:00	Qualification	Subdivision 1
25 July	11:50	Qualification	Subdivision 2
25 July	15:10	Qualification	Subdivision 3
25 July	17:05	Qualification	Subdivision 4
25 July	20:20	Qualification	Subdivision 5
1 August	17:45	Final	–
All times are local time (UTC+09:00).

== Results ==
=== Qualifying ===
Rank	Gymnast	Vault 1				Vault 2				Total	Results
Rank	Gymnast	D Score	E Score	Penalty	Score 1	D Score	E Score	Penalty	Score 2	Total	Results
1	Simone Biles (USA)	6.0	9.266	0.300	14.966	5.8	9.600		15.400	15.183	Q W
2	Jade Carey (USA)	6.0	9.166		15.166	5.8	9.366		15.166	15.166	Q
3	Rebeca Andrade (BRA)	6.0	9.400		15.400	5.4	9.400		14.800	15.100	Q
4	MyKayla Skinner (USA)	6.0	8.933		14.933	5.8	9.000		14.800	14.866	– S
5	Yeo Seo-jeong (KOR)	5.8	9.200		15.000	5.4	9.200		14.600	14.800	Q
6	Shallon Olsen (CAN)	6.0	8.966		14.966	5.4	9.033		14.433	14.699	Q
7	Lilia Akhaimova (ROC)	5.8	8.966		14.766	5.6	9.033		14.633	14.699	Q
8	Alexa Moreno (MEX)	5.8	9.033		14.833	5.6	8.933	0.100	14.433	14.633	Q
9	Angelina Melnikova (ROC)	5.4	9.066		14.466	6.0	8.866	0.100	14.766	14.616	Q
10	Giulia Steingruber (SUI)	5.8	9.033		14.833	5.4	8.900		14.300	14.566	R1
11	Mai Murakami (JPN)	5.4	9.033		14.433	5.8	8.700		14.500	14.466	R2
12	Ellie Black (CAN)	5.4	9.133		14.533	5.2	9.100		14.300	14.416	R3

Reserves

The reserves for the women's vault final were:

1. Giulia Steingruber (SUI)
2. Mai Murakami (JPN)
3. Ellie Black (CAN)

Only two gymnasts from each country may advance to the event final. Gymnasts who did not qualify for the final because of the quota, but had high enough scores to do so were:

- MyKayla Skinner (USA) – called up after Simone Biles' withdrawal

=== Final ===
Position	Gymnast	Vault 1				Vault 2				Total
Position	Gymnast	D Score	E Score	Penalty	Score 1	D Score	E Score	Penalty	Score 2	Total
1st place, gold medalist(s)	Rebeca Andrade (BRA)	6.0	9.266	0.100	15.166	5.8	9.200		15.000	15.083
2nd place, silver medalist(s)	MyKayla Skinner (USA)	6.0	9.033		15.033	5.8	9.000		14.800	14.916
3rd place, bronze medalist(s)	Yeo Seo-jeong (KOR)	6.2	9.133		15.333	5.4	8.733		14.133	14.733
4	Alexa Moreno (MEX)	5.8	8.966		14.766	5.6	9.066		14.666	14.716
5	Angelina Melnikova (ROC)	5.4	9.266		14.666	6.0	8.800	0.100	14.700	14.683
6	Lilia Akhaimova (ROC)	5.8	8.866		14.666	5.6	9.066		14.666	14.666
7	Shallon Olsen (CAN)	6.0	8.700		14.700	5.4	9.000		14.400	14.550
8	Jade Carey (USA)	3.3	8.633		11.933	5.8	9.100	2.000	12.900	12.416
