= Park Ji-sook =

South Korean gymnast (born 1972)

Personal information
- Nationality: South Korean
- Born: 4 December 1972 (age 52)

Sport
- Sport: Gymnastics

- Park Ji-sook
- Hangul: 박지숙
- Hanja: 朴智淑
- RR: Bak Jisuk
- MR: Pak Chisuk

Park Ji-sook (born 4 December 1972) is a South Korean gymnast. She competed in six events at the 1988 Summer Olympics.
