= 2019 Asian Artistic Gymnastics Championships =

Gymnastics championship in Ulaanbaatar, Mongolia

- Host city: Ulaanbaatar, Mongolia
- Dates: 19–22 June 2019
- Main venue: Buyant Ukhaa Sport Palace

The 2019 Asian Artistic Gymnastics Championships was the eighth edition of the Asian Artistic Gymnastics Championships, and were held in Ulaanbaatar, Mongolia from 19 to 22 June 2019.

== Medal summary ==
=== Men ===
Event	Gold	Silver	Bronze
Team	China; Liu Rongbing; Lan Xingyu; Huang Mingqi; Hu Xuwei; Yang Jiaxing	Japan; Daisuke Fudono; Hibiki Arayashiki; Minori Haruki; Tatsuki Tanaka; Junpei Oka	Chinese Taipei; Lee Chih-kai; Tang Chia-hung; Shiao Yu-jan; Hsu Ping-chien; Lin Guan-yi
Individual all-around	Lee Chih-kai; Chinese Taipei	Hu Xuwei; China	Liu Rongbing; China
Floor	Yang Jiaxing; China	Milad Karimi; Kazakhstan	Daisuke Fudono; Japan
Pommel horse	Ahmad Abu Al-Soud; Jordan	Saeid Reza Keikha; Iran	Liu Rongbing; China
Rings	Lan Xingyu; China	Jong Ryong-il; North Korea	Mehdi Ahmad Kohani; Iran
Vault	Huang Mingqi; China	Muhammad Aprizal; Indonesia	Milad Karimi; Kazakhstan
Parallel bars	Liu Rongbing; China	Hu Xuwei; China	Đinh Phương Thành; Vietnam
Horizontal bar	Hu Xuwei; China	Tang Chia-hung; Chinese Taipei	Lê Thanh Tùng; Vietnam

=== Women ===
Event	Gold	Silver	Bronze
Team	China; Lu Yufei; Liu Jieyu; Zhou Ruiyu; Yu Linmin; Zhao Shiting	Japan; Ayaka Sakaguchi; Arisa Sano; Ayumi Niiyama; Natsumi Hanashima; Marin Mune	South Korea; Ham Mi-ju; Lee Eun-ju; Kim Yeon-gi; Park Du-na
Individual all-around	Zhou Ruiyu; China	Lu Yufei; China	Natsumi Hanashima; Japan
Vault	Yu Linmin; China	Ayaka Sakaguchi; Japan	Pranati Nayak; India
Uneven bars	Lu Yufei; China	Zhou Ruiyu; China	Lee Eun-ju; South Korea
Balance beam	Ting Hua-tien; Chinese Taipei	Lee Eun-ju; South Korea	Zhou Ruiyu; China
Floor	Natsumi Hanashima; Japan	Lee Eun-ju; South Korea	Liu Jieyu; China

== Medal table ==
Rank	Nation	Gold	Silver	Bronze	Total
1	China	10	4	4	18
2	Chinese Taipei	2	1	1	4
3	Japan	1	3	2	6
4	Jordan	1	0	0	1
5	South Korea	0	2	2	4
6	Iran	0	1	1	2
6	Kazakhstan	0	1	1	2
8	Indonesia	0	1	0	1
8	North Korea	0	1	0	1
10	Vietnam	0	0	2	2
11	India	0	0	1	1
Totals (11 entries)		14	14	14	42
