= Lee Yun-seo =

South Korean artistic gymnast

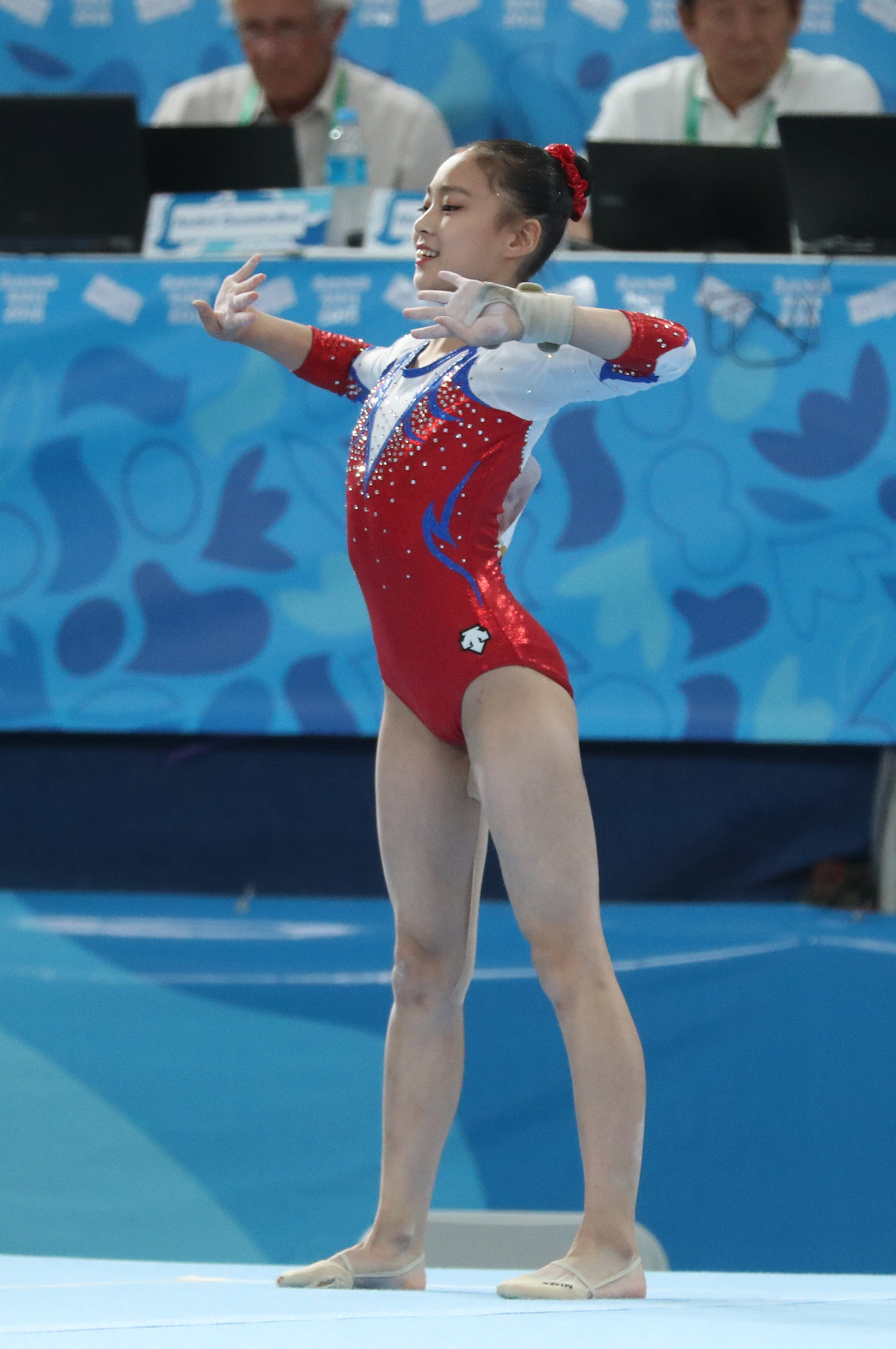
- Lee at the 2018 Youth Olympic Games

Personal information
- Born: 5 March 2003 (age 23) Seoul, South Korea

Gymnastics career
- Discipline: Women's artistic gymnastics
- Country represented: South Korea; (2017–present)
- Club: Gyeongsangbuk Provincial Office
- Head coach: Shin Ki-Jeong
Medal record
Representing South Korea
Asian Championships
Silver medal – second place	2022 Doha	Team
Silver medal – second place	2023 Singapore	Team
Silver medal – second place	2023 Singapore	Uneven bars
Bronze medal – third place	2022 Doha	All-around
Bronze medal – third place	2022 Doha	Uneven bars
Bronze medal – third place	2022 Doha	Floor exercise
Bronze medal – third place	2025 Jecheon	Team
Bronze medal – third place	2026 Zunyi	Team

Lee Yun-seo (born 5 March 2003) is a South Korean artistic gymnast. She is the 2022 Asian uneven bars and team silver medalist and all-around, uneven bars, and floor exercise bronze medalist. She has competed at four World Championships, and she represented South Korea at the 2020 Summer Olympics, the 2024 Summer Olympics and at the 2018 Summer Youth Olympics.

== Early life ==
Lee was born in 2003 in Seoul. Her father, Lee Jong, competed gymnastics internationally in the 1990s and was a coach at Jeonnong Elementary School, where Lee and her brother began gymnastics.

== Junior career ==
Lee made her international debut at the 2017 Junior Asian Championships where she helped the South Korean team win the bronze medal behind China and Japan. She also placed fourth in the all-around and sixth on the balance beam, and she won the bronze medal on the floor exercise behind Chinese gymnasts Li Qi and Chen Yile. She also competed at the 2018 Junior Asian Championships where South Korea once again won the team bronze medal behind China and Japan. Individually, she won the bronze medal in the all-around, the silver medal on the uneven bars, and the bronze medal on the floor exercise.

Lee was selected to compete at the 2018 Youth Olympics in Buenos Aires. There, she qualified for the all-around final where she finished 13th with a total score of 48.899. She also qualified for the uneven bars final where she finished sixth with a score of 13.166. At the 2018 Voronin Cup, she won the bronze medal in the all-around and the floor exercise both behind Russian gymnasts Vladislava Urazova and Viktoria Listunova, and she won the gold medal on the uneven bars.

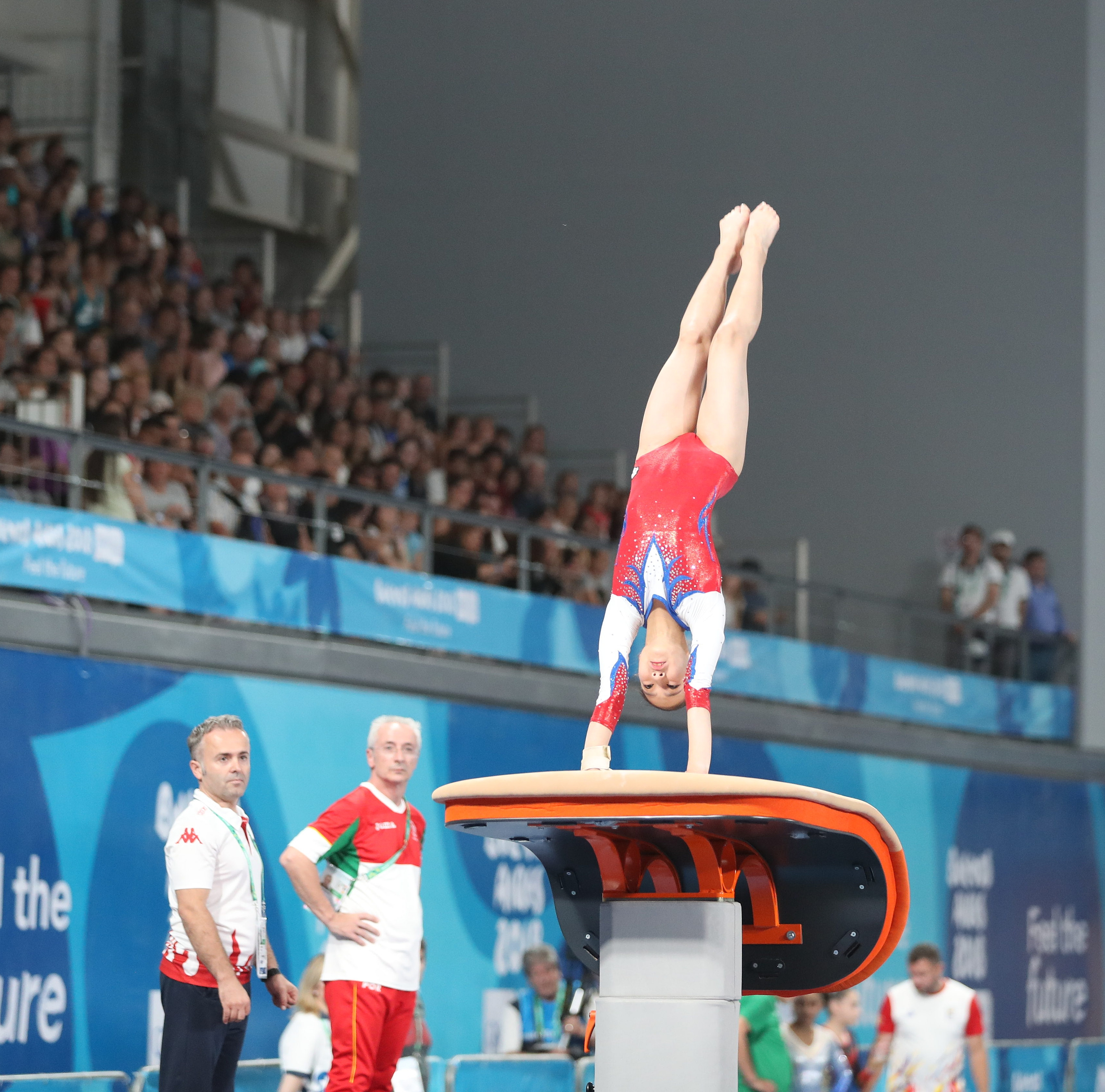
Vault

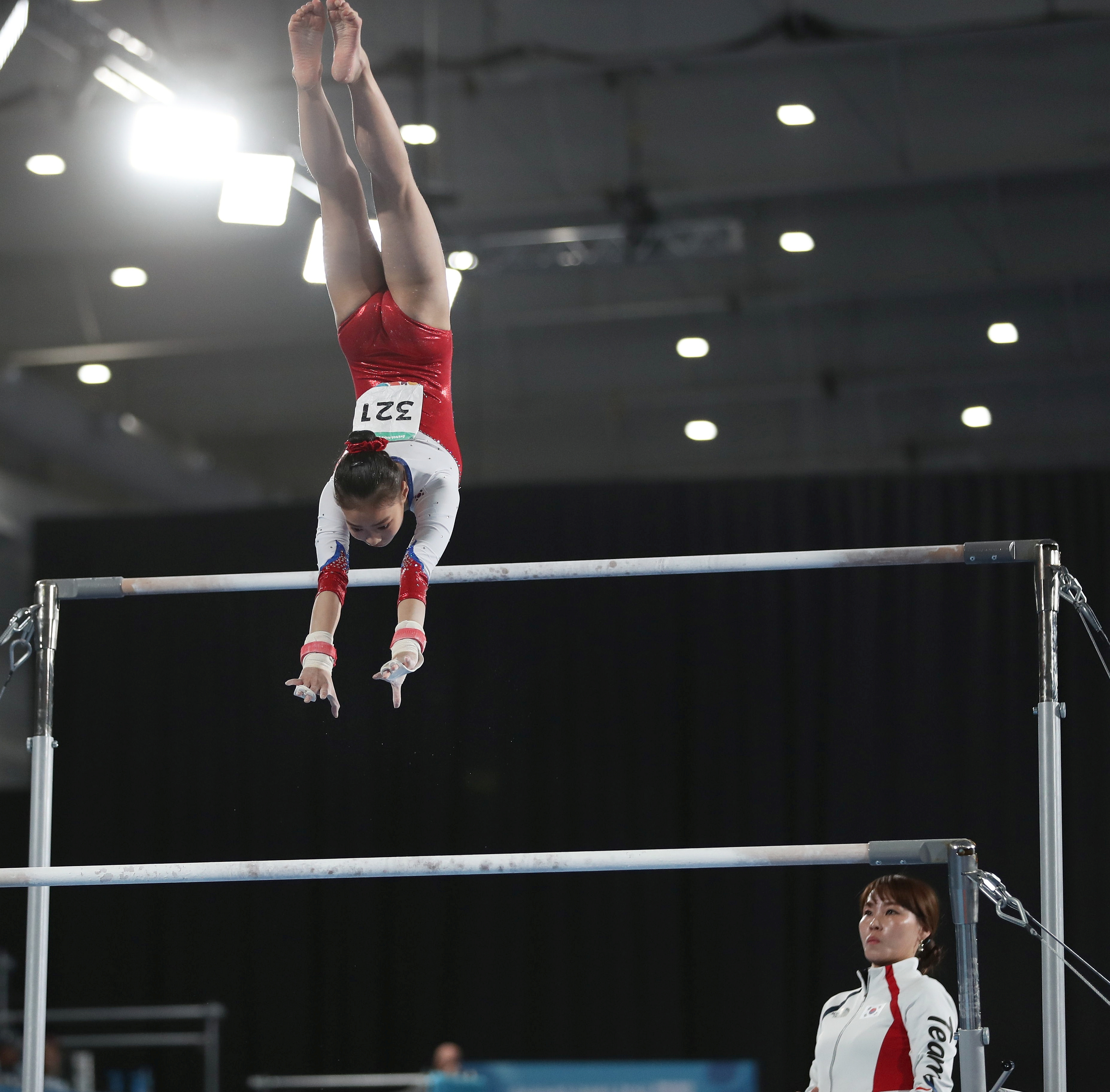
Uneven bars

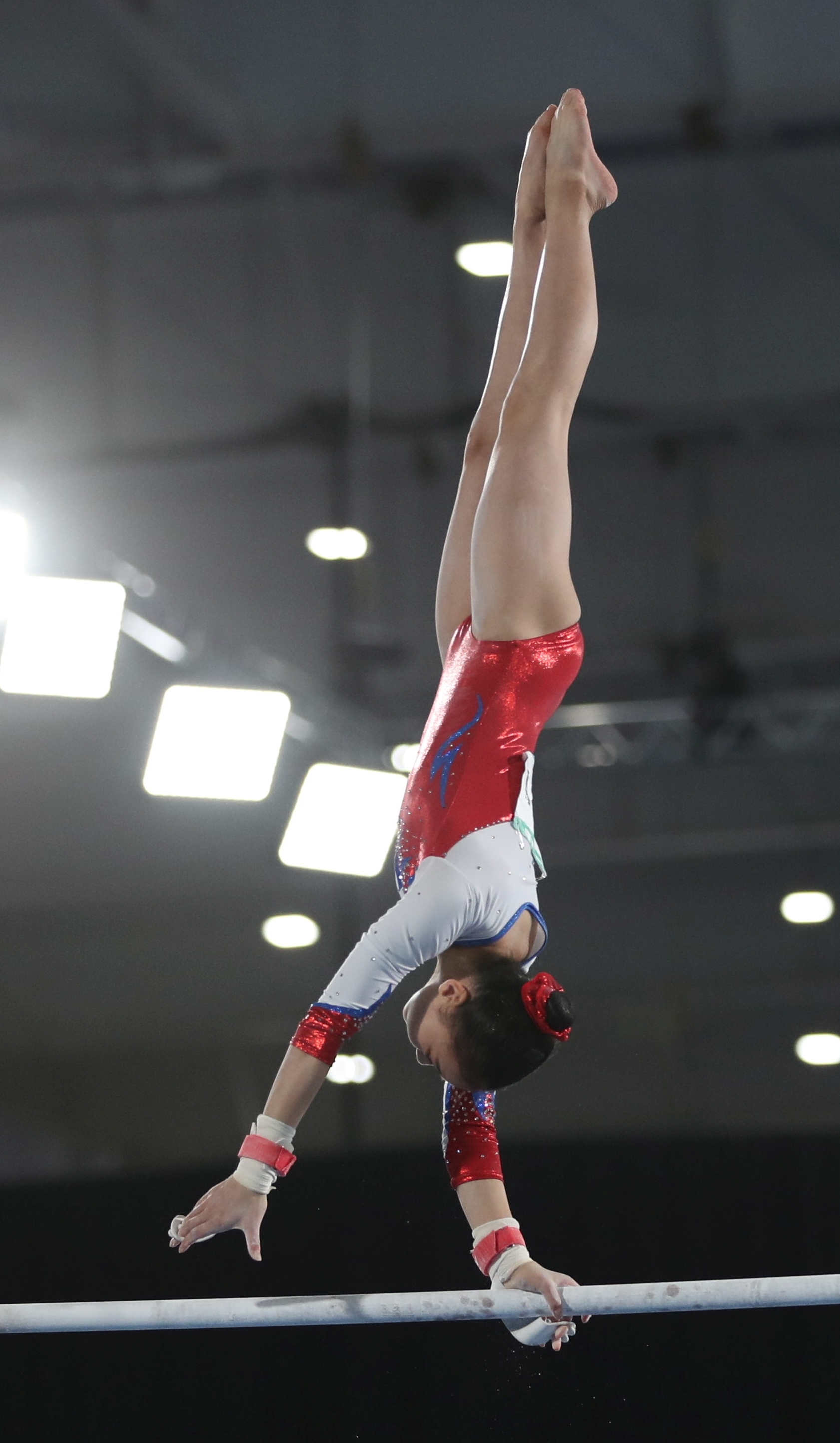
Uneven bars

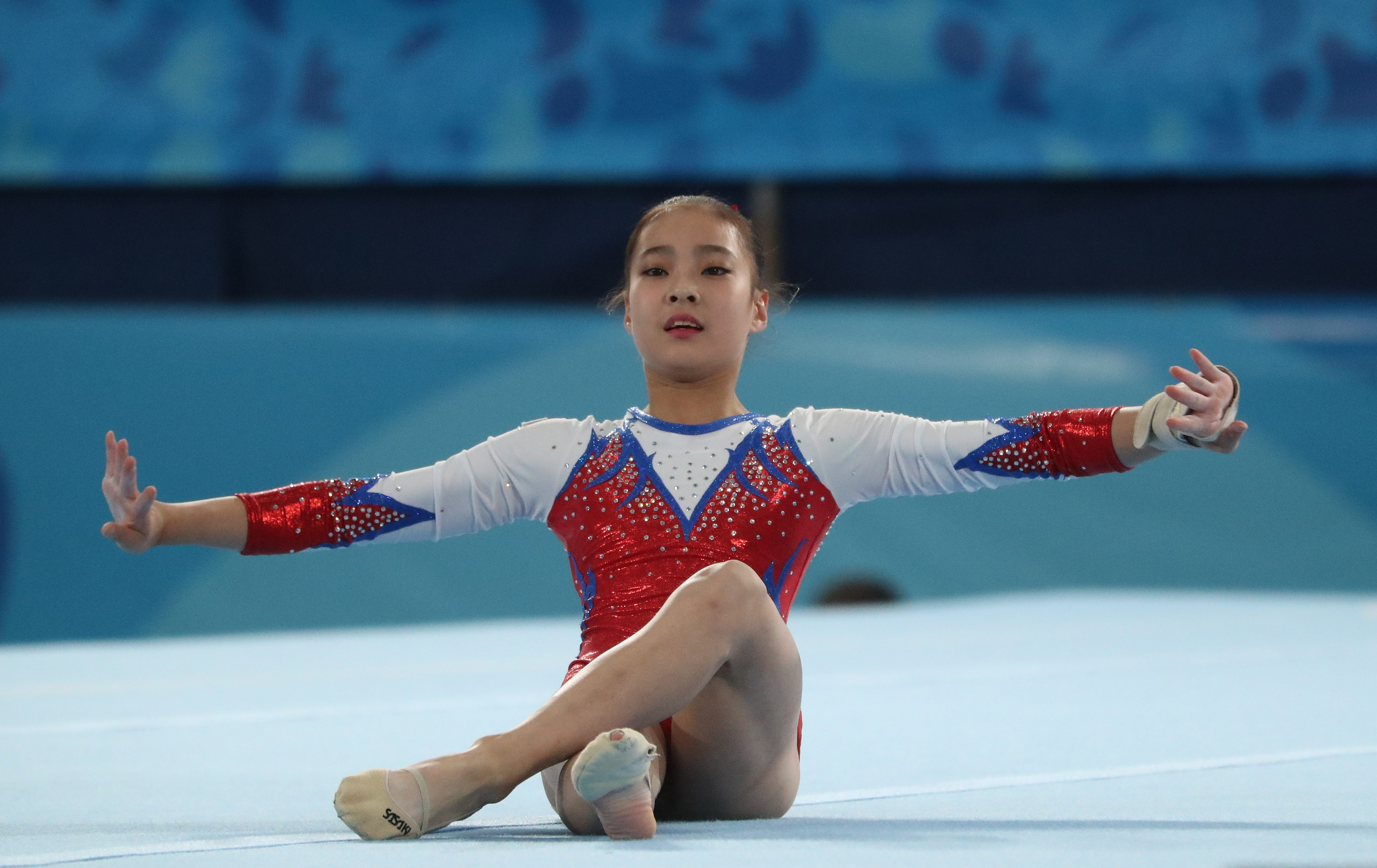
Floor exercise

Lee at the 2018 Youth Olympics

== Senior career ==
=== 2019 ===
Lee made her senior international debut at the American Cup and placed ninth in the all-around. She then went to the Tokyo World Cup and finished seventh in the all-around. At the Korean National Team Selection competition, she finished second in the all-around behind Kim Ju-ry. She then went to the Korea Cup and won the gold medal on the uneven bars. She was then selected to compete at the World Championships alongside Eom Do-hyun, Ham Mi-ju, Lee Eun-ju, and Yeo Seo-jeong, and they finished 16th in the qualification round. Individually, Lee finished 28th in the all-around and was the first reserve for the all-around final. This resulted earned her an individual spot for the 2020 Olympics. Her final competition of the year was the Toyota International where she won the silver medal on the uneven bars behind Angelina Melnikova and the bronze medal on the balance beam behind Melnikova and Hitomi Hatakeda.

=== 2021 ===
Lee did not compete in 2020 due to the COVID-19 pandemic. She returned to competition at the postponed 2020 Olympic Games and qualified for the all-around final where she finished 21st with a total score of 51.632. She then competed at the Korean National Sports Festival and won the gold medal in the all-around, uneven bars, and balance beam, and she won the silver medal on the floor exercise behind Shin Sol-yi. At the World Championships, she qualified for the all-around final in tenth place and was the first reserve for the uneven bars final. In the all-around final, she finished 13th with a total score of 51.699.

=== 2022–2023 ===
Lee competed at the 2022 Asian Championships in June. While there, she helped South Korea place second as a team behind China. Individually, she won bronze in the all-around, on the uneven bars, and on floor exercise. She then competed with the South Korean team at the 2022 World Championships that placed 13th in the qualification round. Individually, Lee qualified for the all-around final and placed 15th.

Lee competed on the uneven bars at the 2023 City of Jesolo Trophy, helping South Korea win the team silver medal behind Italy. She won the bronze medal in the uneven bars final behind Italians Alice D'Amato and Giorgia Villa. She also only competed on the uneven bars are the South Korean Championships, and she placed third. Then at the 2023 Asian Championships, she helped South Korea win the silver medal behind China. Individually, Lee won the silver medal on the uneven bars behind China's Qiu Qiyuan.

At the 2023 World Championships, Lee helped Korea place 11th as a team during qualifications. With this result, South Korea earned a team berth for the 2024 Summer Olympics. Lee qualified for the all-around final and finished 19th with a total score of 51.732.

=== 2024 ===
Lee placed fourth in the all-around at the Korean National Team Selection competition, leading to her selection for the 2024 Summer Olympics team alongside Eom Do-hyun, Lee Da-yeong, Yeo Seo-jeong, and Shin Sol-yi. At the 2024 Summer Olympics, she finished 56th in the all-around, placing 63rd on uneven bars and balance beam, and 75th on floor exercise.

== Competitive history ==
Year	Event	Team	AA	VT	UB	BB	FX
Junior
2017
2017	Junior Asian Championships	3rd place, bronze medalist(s)	4			6	3rd place, bronze medalist(s)
2018
2018	Junior Asian Championships	3rd place, bronze medalist(s)	3rd place, bronze medalist(s)		2nd place, silver medalist(s)		3rd place, bronze medalist(s)
2018	Youth Olympic Games		13		6		
2018	Voronin Cup		3rd place, bronze medalist(s)		1st place, gold medalist(s)		3rd place, bronze medalist(s)
Senior
2019	American Cup		9				
2019	Tokyo World Cup		7				
2019	Korean National Team Selection		2nd place, silver medalist(s)				
2019	Korea Cup				1st place, gold medalist(s)		
2019	World Championships	16	R1				
2019	Toyota International				2nd place, silver medalist(s)	3rd place, bronze medalist(s)	
2021
2021	Olympic Games		21				
2021	Korean National Sports Festival		1st place, gold medalist(s)		1st place, gold medalist(s)	1st place, gold medalist(s)	2nd place, silver medalist(s)
2021	World Championships		13		R1		R2
2022
2022	Asian Championships	2nd place, silver medalist(s)	3rd place, bronze medalist(s)		3rd place, bronze medalist(s)		3rd place, bronze medalist(s)
2022	World Championships		15				
2023	City of Jesolo Trophy	2nd place, silver medalist(s)			3rd place, bronze medalist(s)		
2023	South Korean Championships				3rd place, bronze medalist(s)		
2023	Asian Championships	2nd place, silver medalist(s)	4		2nd place, silver medalist(s)		6
2023	World Championships	11	19				
2024	Korean National Team Selection		4				
2024	Olympic Games	12					
2025
2025	Asian Championships	3rd place, bronze medalist(s)			6		
2025	World Championships				32		
2026
2026	Asian Championships	3rd place, bronze medalist(s)	8			7	7
2026	Asian Games	4			6		
