= Eom Do-hyun =

South Korean artistic gymnast

- 엄도현
- Born: 26 February 2003 (age 23) Seoul, South Korea

Gymnastics career
- Discipline: Women's artistic gymnastics
- Country represented: South Korea
- Club: Jeju Samdasoo
- Head coach: Heo Seon-Mi
Medal record
Representing South Korea
Women's artistic gymnastics
Asian Championships
Silver medal – second place	2023 Singapore	Team
Bronze medal – third place	Jecheon 2025	Team
FIG World Cup
Event / 1st / 2nd / 3rd; World Challenge Cup / 0 / 0 / 3

Eom Do-hyun (Korean: 엄도현; born 26 February 2003) is a South Korean artistic gymnast. She has competed at four World Championships and won three bronze medals at the 2019 Zhaoqing World Challenge Cup. She is the 2021 South Korean all-around champion. She represented South Korea at the 2024 Summer Olympics.

== Early life ==
Eom was born in 2003 in Seoul, and she began gymnastics in grade one at her elementary school. She graduated from Gyeonggi Physical Education High School.

== Gymnastics career ==
Eom made her international debut at the 2018 Asian Junior Championships and placed sixth in the all-around. She helped the South Korean team win the bronze medal behind China and Japan, and she won an individual bronze medal on the balance beam.

Eom became age-eligible for senior international competition in 2019. She made her senior debut at the 2019 Melbourne World Cup and finished sixth on the balance beam. At the Korean National Team Selection meet, she finished third in the all-around. She then won bronze medals on the uneven bars, balance beam, and floor exercise at the 2019 Zhaoqing World Challenge Cup. At the Korean Cup, she competed on the uneven bars and balance beam, finishing fourth and ninth, respectively. She competed with the South Korean team that placed 16th in the qualification round of the 2019 World Championships.

Eom won the all-around title at the 2021 South Korean Championships with the highest scores on all four apparatus. She only competed on the balance beam at the 2021 World Championships and did not advance past the qualification round. She competed with the South Korean team at the 2022 World Championships that placed 13th in the qualification round.

Eom competed at the 2023 City of Jesolo Trophy, helping South Korea win the team silver medal behind Italy. She then won the silver medal in the all-around at the South Korean Championships behind Shin Sol-yi. Then at the 2023 Asian Championships, she helped South Korea win the silver medal behind China. Individually, Eom placed fourth in the balance beam final. She competed at the 2023 World Championships alongside Yeo Seo-jeong, Lee Da-yeong, Lee Yun-seo, and Shin Sol-yi, and they placed 11th in the qualification round. With this result, South Korea earned a team berth for the 2024 Summer Olympics.

Eom finished fifth in the all-around at the Korean National Team Selection competition, leading to her selection for the 2024 Summer Olympics team alongside Yeo Seo-jeong, Lee Da-yeong, Lee Yun-seo, and Shin Sol-yi. At the 2024 Olympics, she placed 66th on uneven bars, 56th on balance beam, and 59th on floor exercise.

== Competitive history ==
Competitive history of Eom Do-hyun
Year	Event	Team	AA	VT	UB	BB	FX
2018
2018	Asian Junior Championships	3rd place, bronze medalist(s)	6			3rd place, bronze medalist(s)	
2019	Melbourne World Cup					6	
2019	Korean National Team Selection		3rd place, bronze medalist(s)				
2019	Zhaoqing World Challenge Cup				3rd place, bronze medalist(s)	3rd place, bronze medalist(s)	3rd place, bronze medalist(s)
2019	Korean Cup				4	9	
2019	World Championships	16					
2021	South Korean Championships		1st place, gold medalist(s)				
2021	World Championships					80	
2022
2022	World Championships	13					
2023	City of Jesolo Trophy	2nd place, silver medalist(s)	26				
2023	South Korean Championships		2nd place, silver medalist(s)				
2023	Asian Championships	2nd place, silver medalist(s)				4	
2023	World Championships	11					
2024	Korean National Team Selection		5				
2024	Olympic Games	12					
2025
2025	Asian Championships	3rd place, bronze medalist(s)	7			5	
