= 2023 Asian Artistic Gymnastics Championships =

Event in Singapore

- Host city: Singapore
- Dates: 10–18 June 2023
- Main venue: OCBC Arena, Singapore Sports Hub

The 2023 Asian Artistic Gymnastics Championships was the 10th edition of the Asian Artistic Gymnastics Championships, held in Singapore from 10 to 18 June 2023.

The event served as a qualification event for the 2023 World Artistic Gymnastics Championships which is scheduled to be held in Antwerp, Belgium from 30 September to 8 October.

== Participating countries ==
- China
- Hong Kong
- India
- Indonesia
- Iran
- Jordan
- Japan

- Kazakhstan
- South Korea
- Malaysia
- Mongolia
- Philippines
- Qatar
- Singapore

- Sri Lanka
- Syria
- Thailand
- Chinese Taipei
- Uzbekistan
- Vietnam

== Medal summary ==
=== Senior ===
Event	Gold	Silver	Bronze
Men
Team all-around	China; Lan Xingyu; Su Weide; Tian Hao; Yin Dehang; Xie Chenyi; Ta Yinga	Japan; Takeru Kitazono; Shinnosuke Oka; Fumiya Sasaki; Ryota Tsumura; Motomu Yoshida	Kazakhstan; Ilyas Azizov; Milad Karimi; Nariman Kurbanov; Dmitriy Patanin; Alisher Toibazarov; Diyas Toishybek
Individual all-around	(Japan) Shinnosuke Oka	(Philippines) Carlos Yulo	(Japan) Takeru Kitazono
Floor exercise	(Philippines) Carlos Yulo	(Kazakhstan) Dmitriy Patanin	(China) Su Weide
Pommel horse	(Kazakhstan) Nariman Kurbanov	(Jordan) Ahmad Abu Al-Soud	(Japan) Ryota Tsumura
Rings	(China) Lan Xingyu	(Vietnam) Nguyễn Văn Khánh Phong	(Hong Kong) Ng Kiu Chung
Vault	(Philippines) Carlos Yulo	(Uzbekistan) Abdulaziz Mirvaliev	(South Korea) Kim Jae-ho
Parallel bars	(Philippines) Carlos Yulo	(Japan) Shinnosuke Oka	(China) Yin Dehang
Horizontal bar	(China) Tian Hao	(Japan) Shinnosuke Oka	(Philippines) Carlos Yulo
Women
Team all-around	China; Chen Xinyi; Jia Ruoyi; Qiu Qiyuan; Zhang Qingying; Zhang Xinyi; Zuo Tong	South Korea; Eom Do-hyun; Lee Yun-seo; Lee Da-yeong; Lim Su-min; Shin Sol-yi; Yeo Seo-jeong	Chinese Taipei; Huang Tzu-hsing; Lai Pin-ju; Liao Yi-Chun; Lin Yi-chen; Ting Hua-tien; Wu Sing-fen
Individual all-around	(China) Qiu Qiyuan	(China) Zhang Qingying	(South Korea) Shin Sol-yi
Vault	(South Korea) Yeo Seo-jeong	(Uzbekistan) Oksana Chusovitina	(Philippines) Aleah Finnegan
Uneven bars	(China) Qiu Qiyuan	(South Korea) Lee Yun-seo	(China) Zuo Tong
Balance beam	(China) Zhang Qingying	(China) Zhang Xinyi	(Philippines) Aleah Finnegan
Floor exercise	(China) Zhang Qingying	(Philippines) Emma Malabuyo	(South Korea) Shin Sol-yi

=== Junior ===
Event	Gold	Silver	Bronze
Men
Team all-around	Japan; Haruki Fukubayashi; Akito Kaneda; Rento Noda; Masaharu Tanida	China; Huai Tianlang; Wang Haoyu; Wang Chengcheng; Zheng Ao	South Korea; Kim Seung-bin; Moon Geon-young; Noh Hye-onu; Park Sun-woo
Individual all-around	(Japan) Masaharu Tanida	(Japan) Rento Noda	(South Korea) Moon Geon-young
Floor exercise	(Japan) Haruki Fukubayashi	(South Korea) Moon Geon-young	(Japan) Akito Kaneda
Pommel horse	(Kazakhstan) Zeinolla Idrissov	(China) Zheng Ao	(Japan) Rento Noda
Rings	(Japan) Masaharu Tanida	(Japan) Akito Kaneda	(Uzbekistan) Ozotilla Abdurasulov
Vault	(China) Wang Chengcheng	(Philippines) Eldrew Yulo	(Kazakhstan) Altynkhan Temirbek
Parallel bars	(Japan) Masaharu Tanida	(Japan) Rento Noda	(China) Zheng Ao
Horizontal bar	(Japan) Masaharu Tanida	(South Korea) Park Sun-woo	(Kazakhstan) Nurtan Idrissov
Women
Team all-around	Japan; Haruka Nakamura; Nako Takahara; Sawa Umemoto; Remi Watanabe	China; Qin Xinyi; Tian Zhuofan; Wang Hao; Wu Sihan; Yu Hanyue	Chinese Taipei; Chao Pin-Yen; Tsai Ai-Jie; Wang Tz-Chin; Wu Yu-Jhih; Yang Ko-Wen
Individual all-around	(Japan) Haruka Nakamura	(China) Tian Zhuofan	(Chinese Taipei) Wu Yu-Jhih
Vault	(Hong Kong) Amber Ward Wen Si	(Japan) Sawa Umemoto	(Malaysia) Marissa Zaiful Azian
Uneven bars	(Japan) Haruka Nakamura	(China) Qin Xinyi	(South Korea) Park Na-young
Balance beam	(China) Tian Zhuofan	(South Korea) Hwang Seo-hyun	(Chinese Taipei) Chao Pin-Yen
Floor exercise	(Japan) Haruka Nakamura	(South Korea) Hwang Seo-hyun	(China) Wu Sihan

== Medal table ==
=== Overall ===
* Host nation (Singapore)

Rank	Nation	Gold	Silver	Bronze	Total
1	Japan	11	7	4	22
2	China	10	7	5	22
3	Philippines	3	3	3	9
4	Kazakhstan	2	1	3	6
5	South Korea	1	6	6	13
6	Hong Kong	1	0	1	2
7	Uzbekistan	0	2	1	3
8	Jordan	0	1	0	1
8	Vietnam	0	1	0	1
10	Chinese Taipei	0	0	4	4
11	Malaysia	0	0	1	1
Totals (11 entries)		28	28	28	84

=== Senior ===
* Host nation (Singapore)

Rank	Nation	Gold	Silver	Bronze	Total
1	China	8	2	3	13
2	Philippines	3	2	3	8
3	Japan	1	3	2	6
4	South Korea	1	2	3	6
5	Kazakhstan	1	1	1	3
6	Uzbekistan	0	2	0	2
7	Jordan	0	1	0	1
7	Vietnam	0	1	0	1
9	Chinese Taipei	0	0	1	1
9	Hong Kong	0	0	1	1
Totals (10 entries)		14	14	14	42

=== Junior ===
* Host nation (Singapore)

Rank	Nation	Gold	Silver	Bronze	Total
1	Japan	10	4	2	16
2	China	2	5	2	9
3	Kazakhstan	1	0	2	3
4	Hong Kong	1	0	0	1
5	South Korea	0	4	3	7
6	Philippines	0	1	0	1
7	Chinese Taipei	0	0	3	3
8	Malaysia	0	0	1	1
8	Uzbekistan	0	0	1	1
Totals (9 entries)		14	14	14	42

== Men's results ==
=== Individual all-around ===
Rank	Gymnast	Floor (gymnastics)	Pommel horse	Rings (gymnastics)	Vault (gymnastics)	Parallel bars	Horizontal bar	Total
1st place, gold medalist(s)	(Japan) Shinnosuke Oka	14.100	14.566	13.866	14.333	15.000	14.200	86.065
2nd place, silver medalist(s)	(Philippines) Carlos Yulo	14.966	13.266	14.300	14.866	15.066	13.466	85.930
3rd place, bronze medalist(s)	(Japan) Takeru Kitazono	13.900	14.333	13.433	14.366	14.966	14.433	85.431
4	(Kazakhstan) Milad Karimi	14.466	13.500	13.300	14.700	13.366	14.366	83.698
5	(China) Tian Hao	13.933	14.166	13.200	13.766	13.466	15.100	83.631
6	(China) Yin Dehang	13.433	14.300	13.666	13.900	14.900	13.000	83.199
7	(South Korea) Ryu Sung-hyun	14.000	13.533	13.400	14.833	14.000	13.366	83.132
8	(Uzbekistan) Khabibullo Ergashev	13.100	13.866	12.866	14.133	13.633	13.233	80.831

=== Floor ===
Rank	Gymnast	D Score	E Score	Pen.	Total
1st place, gold medalist(s)	(Philippines) Carlos Yulo	6.300	9.000		15.300
2nd place, silver medalist(s)	(Kazakhstan) Dmitriy Patanin	5.900	8.466		14.366
3rd place, bronze medalist(s)	(China) Su Weide	6.300	8.033		14.333
4	(Japan) Fumiya Sasaki	5.800	8.433		14.233
5	(Kazakhstan) Milad Karimi	6.300	8.100		14.100
6	(Japan) Shinnosuke Oka	5.900	8.433		13.933
7	(South Korea) Ryu Sung-hyun	5.800	7.633		13.433
8	(Philippines) John Ivan Cruz	5.500	5.933		11.433

=== Pommel horse ===
Rank	Gymnast	D Score	E Score	Pen.	Total
1st place, gold medalist(s)	(Kazakhstan) Nariman Kurbanov	6.600	8.733		15.333
2nd place, silver medalist(s)	(Jordan) Ahmad Abu Al-Soud	6.400	8.833		15.233
3rd place, bronze medalist(s)	(Japan) Ryota Tsumura	6.600	8.433		15.033
4	(China) Yin Dehang	6.400	8.066		14.466
5	(Japan) Shinnosuke Oka	5.800	8.600		14.400
6	(China) Tian Hao	5.800	8.500		14.300
7	(Uzbekistan) Khabibullo Ergashev	5.500	8.300		13.800
8	(Uzbekistan) Abdulla Azimov	6.300	6.600		12.900

=== Rings ===
Rank	Gymnast	D Score	E Score	Pen.	Total
1st place, gold medalist(s)	(China) Lan Xingyu	6.400	8.800		15.200
2nd place, silver medalist(s)	(Vietnam) Nguyễn Văn Khánh Phong	5.900	8.466		14.366
3rd place, bronze medalist(s)	(Hong Kong) Ng Kiu Chung	5.700	8.400		14.100
4	(Philippines) Carlos Yulo	5.700	8.333		14.033
5	(Chinese Taipei) Lin Guan-yi	5.800	8.200		14.000
6	(Japan) Shinnosuke Oka	5.600	8.366		13.966
7	(South Korea) Lee Junghyo	5.300	8.500		13.800
8	(China) Yin Dehang	5.500	7.900		13.400

=== Vault ===
Rank	Gymnast	Vault 1				Vault 2				Total
Rank	Gymnast	D Score	E Score	Pen.	Score 1	D Score	E Score	Pen.	Score 2	Total
1st place, gold medalist(s)	(Philippines) Carlos Yulo	5.600	8.366		13.966	5.600	9.033		14.633	14.299
2nd place, silver medalist(s)	(Uzbekistan) Abdulaziz Mirvaliev	5.600	9.066		14.666	5.600	8.000	–0.1	13.500	14.083
3rd place, bronze medalist(s)	(South Korea) Kim Jae-ho	5.200	9.133		14.333	5.200	8.000		13.200	13.766
4	(Thailand) Tikumporn Surintornta	5.200	8.033		13.233	5.200	8.900		14.100	13.667
5	(Mongolia) Usukhbayar Erkhembayar	4.800	9.166		13.966	4.000	9.300		13.300	13.633
6	(Malaysia) Muhammad Sharul Aimy	5.200	7.833		12.933	5.200	9.100		14.300	13.617
7	(Hong Kong) Ng Ka Ki	5.600	7.766		13.366	5.200	8.600		13.800	13.583
8	(Philippines) Juancho Miguel Besana	5.600	7.933		13.233	5.200	8.700	–0.3	13.600	13.417

=== Parallel bars ===
Rank	Gymnast	D Score	E Score	Pen.	Total
1st place, gold medalist(s)	(Philippines) Carlos Yulo	6.300	8.966		15.266
2nd place, silver medalist(s)	(Japan) Shinnosuke Oka	6.400	8.733		15.133
3rd place, bronze medalist(s)	(China) Yin Dehang	6.400	8.700		15.100
4	(South Korea) Ryu Sung-hyun	5.600	8.833		14.433
5	(South Korea) Ryu Jae-ho	5.400	8.433		13.833
6	(Japan) Takeru Kitazono	5.200	7.600		12.800
7	(China) Lan Xingyu	5.900	6.833		12.733
8	(Vietnam) Nguyễn Phước Hải	5.500	7.133		12.633

=== Horizontal bar ===
Rank	Gymnast	D Score	E Score	Pen.	Total
1	(China) Tian Hao	6.400	8.133		14.533
2	(Japan) Shinnosuke Oka	5.500	8.866		14.366
3	(Philippines) Carlos Yulo	5.400	8.633		14.033
4	(Chinese Taipei) Lee Chih-kai	5.100	8.233		13.333
5	(Uzbekistan) Rasuljon Abdurakhimov	4.900	8.300		13.200
6	(Japan) Takeru Kitazono	5.400	7.366		12.766
7	(China) Su Weide	5.300	6.566		11.866
8	(Kazakhstan) Milad Karimi	5.200	6.366		11.566

== Women's results ==
=== Individual all-around ===
Rank	Gymnast	Vault (gymnastics)	Uneven bars	Balance beam	Floor (gymnastics)	Total
1st place, gold medalist(s)	(China) Qiu Qiyuan	12.766	15.233	13.833	13.100	54.932
2nd place, silver medalist(s)	(China) Zhang Qingying	13.166	12.433	14.833	13.533	53.965
3rd place, bronze medalist(s)	(South Korea) Shin Sol-yi	13.200	13.566	13.500	13.233	53.499
4	(South Korea) Lee Yun-seo	12.500	14.066	12.333	13.166	52.065
5	(Indonesia) Rifda Irfanaluthfi	13.400	12.866	12.266	12.766	51.298
6	(Philippines) Aleah Finnegan	13.800	10.833	12.833	12.933	50.399
7	(Chinese Taipei) Liao Yi-chun	11.933	12.066	12.666	13.033	49.698
8	(Uzbekistan) Dildora Aripova	12.833	12.233	12.533	12.000	49.599

=== Vault ===
Rank	Gymnast	Vault 1				Vault 2				Total
Rank	Gymnast	D Score	E Score	Pen.	Score 1	D Score	E Score	Pen.	Score 2	Total
1st place, gold medalist(s)	(South Korea) Yeo Seo-jeong	5.400	9.033		14.433	5.000	9.200		14.200	14.317
2nd place, silver medalist(s)	(Uzbekistan) Oksana Chusovitina	5.000	8.733	–0.1	13.633	4.400	9.000		13.400	13.517
3rd place, bronze medalist(s)	(Philippines) Aleah Finnegan	4.600	9.266		13.866	4.000	9.100		13.100	13.483
4	(Kazakhstan) Darya Yassinskaya	4.000	8.800		12.800	4.200	9.100		13.300	13.050
5	(Indonesia) Rifda Irfanaluthfi	4.200	8.933		13.133	4.000	8.800		12.800	12.967
6	(China) Zhang Qingying	4.400	8.733		13.133	4.000	8.733		12.733	12.933
7	(South Korea) Shin Sol-yi	4.200	8.866		13.066	3.800	8.866		12.666	12.866
8	(India) Pranati Nayak	4.400	8.433		12.833	4.200	8.100	–0.3	12.000	12.417

=== Uneven bars ===
Rank	Gymnast	D Score	E Score	Pen.	Total
1st place, gold medalist(s)	(China) Qiu Qiyuan	6.700	7.633		14.333
2nd place, silver medalist(s)	(South Korea) Lee Yun-seo	6.200	8.000		14.200
3rd place, bronze medalist(s)	(China) Zuo Tong	5.800	8.100		13.900
4	(South Korea) Shin Sol-yi	5.500	8.100		13.600
5	(Indonesia) Rifda Irfanaluthfi	4.600	8.033		12.633
6	(Sri Lanka) Milka Gehani	4.800	7.666		12.466
7	(Chinese Taipei) Ting Hua-tien	3.800	7.066		10.866
8	(Uzbekistan) Dildora Aripova	4.900	5.733		10.633

=== Balance beam ===
Rank	Gymnast	D Score	E Score	Pen.	Total
1st place, gold medalist(s)	(China) Zhang Qingying	6.200	8.000		14.200
2nd place, silver medalist(s)	(China) Zhang Xinyi	6.000	7.133		13.133
3rd place, bronze medalist(s)	(Philippines) Aleah Finnegan	4.800	8.033		12.833
4	(South Korea) Eom Do-hyun	5.600	6.766		12.366
5	(Philippines) Emma Malabuyo	4.400	7.766		12.166
6	(Singapore) Nadine Joy Nathan	4.900	7.233		12.133
7	(Chinese Taipei) Liao Yi-chun	4.900	6.933		11.833
8	(South Korea) Shin Sol-yi	5.400	6.033		11.433

=== Floor ===
Rank	Gymnast	D Score	E Score	Pen.	Total
1st place, gold medalist(s)	(China) Zhang Qingying	5.400	7.833		13.233
2nd place, silver medalist(s)	(Philippines) Emma Malabuyo	4.900	8.266		13.166
3rd place, bronze medalist(s)	(South Korea) Shin Sol-yi	5.200	7.866		13.066
4	(Philippines) Aleah Finnegan	4.600	8.366		12.966
5	(Chinese Taipei) Liao Yi-chun	5.200	7.633		12.833
6	(South Korea) Lee Yun-seo	5.200	7.333		12.533
7	(China) Qiu Qiyuan	5.200	6.933		12.133
8	(Thailand) Sasiwimon Muangphuean	4.900	7.033		11.933
