= Lee Eun-ju (gymnast) =

South Korean artistic gymnast

Lee Eun-ju 이은주
- Born: March 5, 1999 (age 27) Shimonoseki, Japan
- Height: 4 ft 10 in (147 cm)

Gymnastics career
- Discipline: Women's artistic gymnastics
- Country represented: South Korea (2015–present)
- Club: Kangwon Physical Education High School
- Head coach: Choi Myung-jin
Medal record
Representing South Korea
Asian Championships
Silver medal – second place	2019 Ulaanbaatar	Balance beam
Silver medal – second place	2019 Ulaanbaatar	Floor exercise
Silver medal – second place	2022 Doha	Team
Bronze medal – third place	2015 Hiroshima	Team
Bronze medal – third place	2017 Bangkok	Floor exercise
Bronze medal – third place	2019 Ulaanbaatar	Team
Bronze medal – third place	2019 Ulaanbaatar	Uneven bars

- Lee Eun-ju
- Hangul: 이은주
- Hanja: 李恩宙
- RR: I Eunju
- MR: I Ŭnju

Lee Eun-ju (Korean: 이은주; born March 5, 1999) is a South Korean artistic gymnast who represents her nation at international competitions. She won the bronze medal in the team event at the 2015 Asian Artistic Gymnastics Championships. She competed at the 2016 Gymnastics Olympic Test Event and was chosen to represent her country at the 2016 Summer Olympics after their initial choice, Lee Go-im, was injured in training. Lee placed 53 in the all-around qualification, her best result being a 13.500 on the uneven bars.

Lee came into the limelight during the 2016 Olympics after she took a selfie alongside North Korean gymnast Hong Un-jong.

Lee's mother is Japanese while her father is Korean. She was born in Shimonoseki, Japan and moved to South Korea in 2013.

== Career ==
Lee's senior international debut came at the Asian Championships in Hiroshima, Japan, where she helped South Korea win team bronze. She was passed over for the South Korean team for the World Championships that fall, but was named to the team for the Olympic Test Event the following April. South Korea placed eighth and did not qualify a full team to the Olympics.

Following the Test Event, she competed at the South Korean National Championships, winning uneven bars and balance beam gold, and all-around, vault, and floor exercise silver. She was initially named the alternate for the Olympics in Rio de Janeiro, Brazil, until her compatriot Lee Go-Im suffered an injury in training. Lee was subbed in to take her place.

=== 2016 Olympics ===
Lee competed in the first subdivision of qualifications, starting on floor exercise. She placed fifty-third in the all-around, fifty-seventh on uneven bars, sixty-eighth on floor exercise, and seventieth on balance beam.

Despite winning no medals, she made worldwide headline after being captured on camera taking a selfie with her North Korean counterpart, Hong Un-jong. A Reuters picture of the two smiling women was praised for capturing the spirit of the Games. IOC President Thomas Bach called the selfie a "great gesture".

== Medal count ==
Year	Event	Team	AA	VT	UB	BB	FX
2015	Hiroshima Asian Championships	3rd place, bronze medalist(s)					
2016	Rio de Janeiro Olympic Test Event	8					
2016	South Korean Championships		2nd place, silver medalist(s)	2nd place, silver medalist(s)	1st place, gold medalist(s)	1st place, gold medalist(s)	2nd place, silver medalist(s)
2017	South Korean Championships		4	4	1st place, gold medalist(s)	5	2nd place, silver medalist(s)
2017	Bangkok Asian Championships		6		6	7	3rd place, bronze medalist(s)
2017	World Championships		22				
