= Equestrian at the 2026 Summer Youth Olympics – Individual jumping =

Individual jumping at the IV Summer Youth Olympic Games
- Venue: Diamniadio Equestrian Center
- Dates: 3–6 November
- Competitors: 24 from 24 nations

Medalists
1st place, gold medalist(s)		Mike Smits	Switzerland
2nd place, silver medalist(s)		Liza Tittle	United States
3rd place, bronze medalist(s)		Alejandro Gutiérrez	Colombia

The individual show jumping event at the 2026 Summer Youth Olympics took place from 3 to 6 November 2026.

== Schedule ==
All times are local (UTC+0).

Date	Time	Round
Tuesday, 3 November	9:00	Round A
Thursday, 5 November	9:00	Round B
Friday, 6 November	9:00	Final

== Results ==
=== Qualification ===
Rank	Rider	Nation	Horse	Penalties Round A			Penalties Round B			Total Penalties A+B	Time B	Notes
Rank	Rider	Nation	Horse	Jump	Time	Total	Jump	Time	Total	Total Penalties A+B	Time B	Notes
1	Mike Smits	Switzerland	Barentin de Rampan	0	0	0	0	0	0	0	76.01	Q
2	Sresht Mantena	India	Crazy Horse Boop	0	0	0	0	0	0	0	76.36	Q
3	Cristian Tejada	Guatemala	Comme D'hbitude Jem	0	0	0	0	0	0	0	77.28	Q
4	Valentine Platini	Monaco	Elite Longane	0	0	0	4	0	4	4	71.75	Q
5	Liza Tittle	United States	Senji De Reaute	4	0	4	0	0	0	4	79.11	Q
6	María Eiras	Argentina	Haloha Kandooma	4	0	4	4	0	4	8	67.59	Q
7	Ghali Bougja	Morocco	Alato De La Sense	8	1	9	0	0	0	9	79.48	Q
8	Younes Ferradj	Algeria	Decibelle Tardonne	4	6	10	0	0	0	10	70.00	Q
9	Bo Reed	South Africa	Carrera de Groom	12	0	12	0	0	0	12	69.14	Q
10	Molly Mooney	Australia	Tina De Ponts	8	0	8	4	0	4	12	70.24	Q
11	Nusrtdinov Zayan Fatih	Indonesia	Ucaral De Beaujour	8	0	8	4	0	4	12	72.60	Q
12	Terry Angelos	Zimbabwe	Cayenne 2000 Z	4	8	12	0	0	0	12	78.30	Q
13	Alejandro Gutiérrez	Colombia	Villeroy Van Het Harteveld Z	4	0	4	4	4	8	12	89.10	Q
14	Alya Al-Mheiri	United Arab Emirates	Kralista Du Rezidal	4	1	5	8	0	8	13	71.81	Q
15	Eden Kazoum	Senegal	Gaby Van de Rock	4	0	4	12	0	12	16	70.58	Q
16	Yassin El-Bassiuony	Egypt	Patton Utah	8	0	8	8	0	8	16	77.60	Q
17	Bruna de Rossetti	Chile	Haribo Moussardiere	12	5	17	0	0	0	17	79.33	Q
18	Anna Brukhnova	Brazil	For Fun De Wasigny Z	12	7	19	0	0	0	19	72.98	Q
19	Sun Ruirui	China	Astral Z	4	15	19	0	0	0	19	77.30	Q
20	Sofia Williams	New Zealand	Eloise	8	0	8	12	0	12	20	71.84	Q
21	Iaroslav Pushkin	Russia	Jistra	16	3	19	12	0	12	31	76.08	Q
22	Joaquín Beltrán	Ecuador	Superman	16	13	29	4	0	4	33	75.61	Q
23	Olivia Cosenza	Honduras	Duracell II	20	0	20	12	4	16	36	89.68	Q
24	Valentina Jarl	Sweden	Lollipop	Eliminated			12	0	12	12	71.51	Q

=== Final ===
Rank	Rider	Nation	Horse	Penalties			Time	Notes
Rank	Rider	Nation	Horse	Jump	Time	Total	Time	Notes
1	Sofia Williams	New Zealand	Eloise	0	0	0	78.34	Q
1	Sun Ruirui	China	Astral Z	0	0	0	81.81	Q
1	Bruna de Rossetti	Chile	Haribo Moussardiere	0	0	0	80.13	Q
1	Alya Al-Mheiri	United Arab Emirates	Kralista Du Rezidal	0	0	0	76.18	Q
1	Alejandro Gutiérrez	Colombia	Villeroy Van Het Harteveld Z	0	0	0	81.47	Q
1	Terry Angelos	Zimbabwe	Cayenne 2000 Z	0	0	0	78.44	Q
1	Bo Reed	South Africa	Carrera de Groom	0	0	0	77.81	Q
1	Younes Ferradj	Algeria	Decibelle Tardonne	0	0	0	77.34	Q
1	Liza Tittle	United States	Senji De Reaute	0	0	0	80.74	Q
1	Cristian Tejada	Guatemala	Comme D'hbitude Jem	0	0	0	77.55	Q
1	Sresht Mantena	India	Crazy Horse Boop	0	0	0	80.09	Q
1	Mike Smits	Switzerland	Barentin de Rampan	0	0	0	81.57	Q
13	Molly Mooney	Australia	Tina De Ponts	4	0	4	71.38	
14	María Eiras	Argentina	Haloha Kandooma	4	0	4	72.20	
15	Valentine Platini	Monaco	Elite Longane	4	0	4	73.34	
16	Anna Brukhnova	Brazil	For Fun De Wasigny Z	4	0	4	82.32	
17	Nusrtdinov Zayan Fatih	Indonesia	Ucaral De Beaujour	8	0	8	80.57	
18	Yassin El-Bassiuony	Egypt	Patton Utah	8	1	9	86.39	
19	Joaquín Beltrán	Ecuador	Superman	4	6	10	91.69	
20	Iaroslav Pushkin	Russia	Jistra	12	0	12	78.18	
21	Valentina Jarl	Sweden	Lollipop	12	0	12	79.55	
22	Eden Kazoum	Senegal	Gaby Van de Rock	8	6	14	91.65	
23	Olivia Cosenza	Honduras	Duracell II	16	7	23	92.77	
	Ghali Bougja	Morocco	Alato De La Sense	Withdrawn				

=== Jump-off ===
Rank	Rider	Nation	Horse	Penalties	Time (s)
1st place, gold medalist(s)	Mike Smits	Switzerland	Barentin de Rampan	0	37.81
2nd place, silver medalist(s)	Liza Tittle	United States	Senji De Reaute	0	38.51
3rd place, bronze medalist(s)	Alejandro Gutiérrez	Colombia	Villeroy Van Het Harteveld Z	0	38.72
4	Cristian Tejada	Guatemala	Comme D'hbitude Jem	4	36.57
5	Younes Ferradj	Algeria	Decibelle Tardonne	4	37.44
6	Sofia Williams	New Zealand	Eloise	4	37.79
7	Sresht Mantena	India	Crazy Horse Boop	4	38.60
8	Bo Reed	South Africa	Carrera de Groom	4	42.23
9	Alya Al-Mheiri	United Arab Emirates	Kralista Du Rezidal	8	36.50
10	Bruna de Rossetti	Chile	Haribo Moussardiere	8	40.41
11	Terry Angelos	Zimbabwe	Cayenne 2000 Z	8	49.46
12	Sun Ruirui	China	Astral Z	Eliminated	
