= Swimming at the 2026 Summer Youth Olympics =

Swimming at the IV Summer Youth Olympic Games
- Venue: Dakar Aquatic Centre
- Dates: 1–6 November
- No. of events: 28
- Competitors: 307 from 154 nations

Swimming at the 2026 Summer Youth Olympics was held from 1 to 6 November at the Dakar Aquatic Centre at the Tour de l'Oeuf Complex.

== Schedule ==
The schedule was released by the Dakar Youth Olympic Games Organizing Committee. In the table below, M stands for morning (begins 10:00), and A stands for afternoon (begins 15:00).

On 30 October 2026 it was announced that the originally planned races over 800 m freestyle were canceled. Athlets who had planned to enter in those races were allowed to start in an additional event of their choice.

H	Heats	F	Final

Date →	Sun 1		Mon 2		Tue 3		Wed 4		Thu 5		Fri 6	
Event ↓	M	A	M	A	M	A	M	A	M	A	M	A
Men's 50 m freestyle							H	F				
Men's 100 m freestyle			H	F								
Men's 200 m freestyle											H	F
Men's 400 m freestyle					F							
Men's 50 m backstroke									H	F		
Men's 100 m backstroke					H	F						
Men's 200 m backstroke	H	F										
Men's 50 m breaststroke									H	F		
Men's 100 m breaststroke					H	F						
Men's 200 m breaststroke			H	F								
Men's 50 m butterfly							H	F				
Men's 100 m butterfly	H	F										
Men's 200 m butterfly											H	F
Men's 200 m individual medley							H	F				
Date →	Sun 1		Mon 2		Tue 3		Wed 4		Thu 5		Fri 6	
Event ↓	M	A	M	A	M	A	M	A	M	A	M	A
Women's 50 m freestyle							H	F				
Women's 100 m freestyle			H	F								
Women's 200 m freestyle											H	F
Women's 400 m freestyle	F											
Women's 50 m backstroke									H	F		
Women's 100 m backstroke					H	F						
Women's 200 m backstroke	H	F										
Women's 50 m breaststroke									H	F		
Women's 100 m breaststroke					H	F						
Women's 200 m breaststroke			H	F								
Women's 50 m butterfly							H	F				
Women's 100 m butterfly	H	F										
Women's 200 m butterfly												F
Women's 200 m individual medley							H	F				

All times are local (UTC±0).

== Medal summary ==
=== Medal table ===
* Host nation (Senegal)

Rank	Nation	Gold	Silver	Bronze	Total
1	Japan	6	2	0	8
2	China	4	3	0	7
3	Russia	4	1	0	5
4	Egypt	3	0	0	3
5	New Zealand	2	3	0	5
6	Croatia	2	2	0	4
7	Romania	2	1	0	3
8	Greece	1	2	1	4
9	Argentina	1	0	2	3
10	Portugal	1	0	1	2
11	Czech Republic	1	0	0	1
11	Ecuador	1	0	0	1
11	Saudi Arabia	1	0	0	1
14	South Africa	0	2	1	3
15	Serbia	0	2	0	2
15	South Korea	0	2	0	2
17	Brazil	0	1	1	2
17	Lithuania	0	1	1	2
19	Hungary	0	1	0	1
19	Iran	0	1	0	1
19	Lebanon	0	1	0	1
19	Trinidad and Tobago	0	1	0	1
19	Vietnam	0	1	0	1
24	India	0	0	3	3
24	Mexico	0	0	3	3
26	Belarus	0	0	2	2
26	Belgium	0	0	2	2
26	Cyprus	0	0	2	2
26	Hong Kong	0	0	2	2
26	Slovakia	0	0	2	2
31	Chinese Taipei	0	0	1	1
31	Indonesia	0	0	1	1
31	Israel	0	0	1	1
31	Turkey	0	0	1	1
31	Uzbekistan	0	0	1	1
Totals (35 entries)		29	27	28	84

=== Events ===
==== Men's events ====
Games	Gold		Silver		Bronze	
50 m freestyle	Zdeněk Procházka; Czech Republic	22.54	Jaden Mills; Trinidad and Tobago	22.99	Andrew Laghoutis; Cyprus	23.04
100 m freestyle	Bogdan Toropkin; Russia	49.66	Xie Yichen; China	50.18	Lee Han; Chinese Taipei	50.26
200 m freestyle	Bogdan Toropkin; Russia	1:47.78	Olivér Pápai; Hungary	1:48.43	Daniel Saborío; Mexico	1:49.68
400 m freestyle	Rami Al-Rahmouni; Saudi Arabia	3:47.86	Bogdan Toropkin; Russia	3:50.46	Daniel Saborío; Mexico	3:52.72
50 m backstroke	Nikolaos Papatheodorou; Greece	25.69	Not awarded		Alexander Van Hoey Billiet; Belgium	25.91
50 m backstroke	Miguel Reis Oliveira; Portugal	25.69	Not awarded		Alexander Van Hoey Billiet; Belgium	25.91
100 m backstroke	Ariel Muchirahondo; New Zealand	55.69	Nikolaos Papatheodorou; Greece	55.79	Miguel Reis Oliveira; Portugal	56.24
200 m backstroke	Ariel Muchirahondo; New Zealand	1:59.15	Parsa Shahshahani; Iran	2:02.74	Nikolaos Papatheodorou; Greece	2:03.23
50 m breaststroke	Xie Yichen; China	28.13	Iori Miyazaki; Japan	28.42	Maksim Mashliakevich; Belarus	28.46
100 m breaststroke	Xie Yichen; China	1:01.03	Iori Miyazaki; Japan	1:01.30	Domas Vilimas; Lithuania	1:01.75
200 m breaststroke	Iori Miyazaki; Japan	2:12.33	Domas Vilimas; Lithuania	2:13.50	Muhammadismail Rahmonov; Uzbekistan	2:15.79
50 m butterfly	Zain Hesham; Egypt	24.06	Aleksej Kalanj; Serbia	24.54	Andrew Laghoutis; Cyprus	24.57
100 m butterfly	Zain Hesham; Egypt	52.16	Aleksej Kalanj; Serbia	54.03	Matiáš Krištof; Slovakia	54.71
200 m butterfly	Zain Hesham; Egypt	1:57.88	Dương Văn Hoàng Quy; Vietnam	2:00.32	Tirthank Pegu; India	2:01.25
200 m individual medley	Iori Miyazaki; Japan	2:00.71	Ariel Muchirahondo; New Zealand	2:01.66	Kırhan Yılmaz; Turkey	2:02.91

==== Women's events ====
Games	Gold		Silver		Bronze	
50 m freestyle	Ana Bobanović; Croatia	25.45	Alyssa Lawson; New Zealand	25.74	Palina Bialiauskaya; Belarus	25.97
100 m freestyle	Ana Bobanović; Croatia	55.89	Alyssa Lawson; New Zealand	56.13	Dhinidhi Desinghu; India	56.27
200 m freestyle	Chang Mohan; China	1:59.59	Ana Bobanović; Croatia	2:01.17	Dhinidhi Desinghu; India	2:02.28
400 m freestyle	Elvira Espinosa; Ecuador	4:22.87	Leah Markgraaff; South Africa	4:26.13	Célya Paques; Belgium	4:28.37
50 m backstroke	Daria Silișteanu; Romania	27.93	Kim Seung-won; South Korea	28.21	Cecilia Dieleke; Argentina	28.83
100 m backstroke	Daria Silișteanu; Romania	59.98	Kim Seung-won; South Korea	1:00.25	Cecilia Dieleke; Argentina	1:00.83
200 m backstroke	Cecilia Dieleke; Argentina	2:10.05	Eirini Zervou; Greece	2:15.52	Ofir Simcha; Israel	2:17.44
50 m breaststroke	Mana Ishikawa; Japan	31.76	Thea Obeid; Lebanon	32.00	Man Wui Kiu; Hong Kong	32.04
100 m breaststroke	Mana Ishikawa; Japan	1:08.81	Chanel Veldsman; South Africa	1:09.48	Man Wui Kiu; Hong Kong	1:10.33
200 m breaststroke	Mana Ishikawa; Japan	2:26.50	Chang Mohan; China	2:27.21	Chanel Veldsman; South Africa	2:30.87
50 m butterfly	Serafima Fokina; Russia	27.28	Ana Bobanović; Croatia	27.33	Fernanda García; Mexico	27.49
100 m butterfly	Serafima Fokina; Russia	59.81	Daria Silișteanu; Romania	1:00.31	Ana Júlia Amaral; Brazil	1:00.49
200 m butterfly	Chang Mohan; China	2:09.93	Ana Júlia Amaral; Brazil	2:13.01	Michelle Surjadi Fang; Indonesia	2:14.10
200 m individual medley	Mana Ishikawa; Japan	2:13.06	Chang Mohan; China	2:13.90	Stela Megelová; Slovakia	2:16.38

== Participating nations ==
These nations will take part in the swimming events:

- Algeria (4)
- Angola (4)
- Antigua and Barbuda (2)
- Argentina (2)
- Armenia (2)
- Aruba (2)
- Austria (2)
- Azerbaijan (2)
- Bahamas (2)
- Bahrain (2)
- Bangladesh (2)
- Barbados (1)
- Belarus (2)
- Belgium (2)
- Benin (3)
- Bermuda (2)
- Bolivia (2)
- Botswana (2)
- Brazil (2)
- Brunei (1)
- Bulgaria (2)
- Burkina Faso (2)
- Burundi (2)
- Cambodia (2)
- Cameroon (2)
- Cape Verde (3)
- Cayman Islands (2)
- Chile (2)
- China (2)
- Chinese Taipei (2)
- Colombia (2)
- Comoros (2)
- Cook Islands (2)
- Costa Rica (2)
- Croatia (2)
- Cyprus (2)
- Czech Republic (2)
- Democratic Republic of the Congo (1)
- Dominica (1)
- Dominican Republic (2)
- Ecuador (1)
- Egypt (1)
- El Salvador (2)
- Estonia (2)
- Eswatini (1)
- Ethiopia (4)
- Federated States of Micronesia (1)
- Fiji (2)
- Gabon (2)
- Georgia (2)
- Ghana (4)
- Greece (2)
- Grenada (2)
- Guam (1)
- Guatemala (2)
- Guinea (3)
- Guinea-Bissau (1)
- Guyana (1)
- Haiti (1)
- Honduras (2)
- Hong Kong (2)
- Hungary (2)
- Iceland (2)
- India (2)
- Indonesia (2)
- Iran (1)
- Israel (1)
- Italy (2)
- Ivory Coast (1)
- Jamaica (2)
- Japan (2)
- Jordan (2)
- Kazakhstan (2)
- Kenya (2)
- Kuwait (2)
- Kyrgyzstan (2)
- Laos (2)
- Latvia (2)
- Lebanon (1)
- Libya (1)
- Lithuania (2)
- Madagascar (2)
- Malawi (2)
- Malaysia (2)
- Maldives (2)
- Mali (1)
- Malta (2)
- Marshall Islands (1)
- Mexico (2)
- Moldova (2)
- Mongolia (2)
- Morocco (2)
- Mozambique (2)
- Namibia (4)
- Nepal (2)
- New Zealand (2)
- Nicaragua (1)
- Niger (1)
- Nigeria (4)
- North Macedonia (1)
- Oman (1)
- Pakistan (2)
- Palau (1)
- Palestine (2)
- Panama (2)
- Papua New Guinea (1)
- Paraguay (2)
- Peru (2)
- Philippines (2)
- Poland (2)
- Portugal (2)
- Puerto Rico (1)
- Qatar (1)
- Republic of the Congo (1)
- Romania (2)
- Russia (2)
- Rwanda (4)
- Saint Lucia (2)
- Saint Vincent and the Grenadines (2)
- Samoa (2)
- San Marino (1)
- Saudi Arabia (1)
- Senegal (6)
- Serbia (2)
- Seychelles (2)
- Sierra Leone (1)
- Slovakia (2)
- Slovenia (2)
- South Africa (4)
- South Korea (2)
- Sri Lanka (2)
- Sudan (1)
- Suriname (2)
- Tajikistan (2)
- Tanzania (4)
- The Gambia (1)
- Thailand (2)
- Timor-Leste (2)
- Tonga (2)
- Trinidad and Tobago (2)
- Tunisia (4)
- Turkey (2)
- Uganda (4)
- Ukraine (2)
- United Arab Emirates (1)
- Uruguay (2)
- Uzbekistan (2)
- Vanuatu (2)
- Venezuela (2)
- Vietnam (2)
- Virgin Islands (2)
- Yemen (1)
- Zambia (3)
- Zimbabwe (4)
