= Coastal rowing at the 2026 Summer Youth Olympics – Men's solo =

Men's coastal rowing at the 2026 Summer Youth Olympics

Men's solo at the 2026 Summer Youth Olympics
- Venue: Saly Beach West
- Dates: 31 October – 3 November 2026
- Competitors: 32 from 32 nations

Medalists
gold medal	Callum Dreyer	South Africa
silver medal	Diego Molina	Spain
bronze medal	Adam Moor	Hungary

The men's solo competition in coastal rowing at the 2026 Summer Youth Olympics was held from 31 October to 3 November 2026 at Saly Beach West in Saly, Senegal. The competition began with two time trials, followed by knockout races. The eight fastest athletes in the first time trial advanced directly to the last 16, while the remaining athletes competed in a second time trial for the remaining places.

== Results ==
=== Time trial 1 ===
The eight fastest athletes qualified directly for the last 16. These qualifiers are highlighted in green.

Rank	Athlete	Nationality	Time	Qualification
1	Iason Mouselimis	Greece	2:39.75	Q
2	Yossuf Moursi	Egypt	2:40.60	Q
3	Davide Gazzola	Italy	2:41.54	Q
4	Callum Dreyer	South Africa	2:42.14	Q
5	Johann Meyer	Germany	2:44.56	Q
6	Diego Molina	Spain	2:44.60	Q
7	Steven Runin	Switzerland	2:45.02	Q
8	Adam Moor	Hungary	2:45.26	Q
9	Iyed Zantour	Tunisia	2:47.26	
10	Cai Chun	Hong Kong	2:49.30	
11	Mykola Tomchai	Ukraine	2:49.34	
12	Justas Domarkas	Lithuania	2:49.39	
13	João Pedro França Silva	Brazil	2:49.63	
14	Trairat Panthong	Thailand	2:49.64	
15	José Azevedo	Portugal	2:50.81	
16	Su Juntao	China	2:51.15	
17	Dhari Alabbas	Kuwait	2:51.35	
18	Teo Rubio	Peru	2:51.69	
19	Ondrej Zizka	Czech Republic	2:51.79	
20	Lukas Schoenhuber	Austria	2:52.45	
21	Enrique Morelos	Mexico	2:54.06	
22	Raphael de Boussac	France	2:55.18	
23	Joaquín Pare	Argentina	2:55.38	
24	Zihni Senih Alatas	Turkey	2:55.98	
25	Alexander Watt	Australia	2:56.00	
26	Constantin Medan	Romania	3:00.70	
27	Isaac Moos	United States	3:01.76	
28	El Hadji Malick Lo	Senegal	3:02.63	
29	Ahmed Alazzawi	Iraq	3:04.75	
30	Teva Chabod	Vanuatu	3:14.42	
31	Marcel Otim	Uganda	3:24.00	
32	Louie Walker	Great Britain	3:30.38	

=== Time trial 2 ===
Athletes who did not qualify directly in the first time trial competed in the second time trial. The eight fastest athletes qualified for the last 16. Qualifiers are highlighted in green.

Rank	Athlete	Nationality	Time	Qualification
1	Lukas Schoenhuber	Austria	2:30.44	Q
2	Su Juntao	China	2:30.95	Q
3	Mykola Tomchai	Ukraine	2:31.30	Q
4	Ondrej Zizka	Czech Republic	2:33.14	Q
5	Justas Domarkas	Lithuania	2:33.25	Q
6	Zihni Senih Alatas	Turkey	2:34.36	Q
7	Enrique Morelos	Mexico	2:36.52	Q
8	Raphael de Boussac	France	2:37.13	Q
9	Louie Walker	Great Britain	2:37.23	
10	Teo Rubio	Peru	2:37.96	
11	Iyed Zantour	Tunisia	2:38.01	
12	Ahmed Alazzawi	Iraq	2:38.16	
13	José Azevedo	Portugal	2:39.41	
14	João Pedro França Silva	Brazil	2:39.89	
15	Isaac Moos	United States	2:39.97	
16	Dhari Alabbas	Kuwait	2:41.43	
17	Joaquín Pare	Argentina	2:41.46	
18	Cai Chun	Hong Kong	2:41.62	
19	Alexander Watt	Australia	2:41.85	
20	Trairat Panthong	Thailand	2:45.43	
21	El Hadji Malick Lo	Senegal	2:49.43	
22	Teva Chabod	France	2:51.52	
23	Constantin Medan	Romania	2:51.65	
24	Marcel Otim	Uganda	3:04.97	

== Knockout stage ==
=== Last 16 ===
Match	Country	Athlete	Result	Progression
1	France	Raphael de Boussac	2:20.29	Q
1	Greece	Iason Mouselimis	2:49.56	ELM
2	Egypt	Yossuf Moursi	2:21.01	Q
2	Mexico	Enrique Morelos	2:23.25	ELM
3	Italy	Davide Gazzola	2:23.34	Q
3	Turkey	Zihni Senih Alatas	2:26.49	ELM
4	South Africa	Callum Dreyer	2:19.71	Q
4	Lithuania	Justas Domarkas	2:21.43	ELM
5	Czech Republic	Ondrej Zizka	2:24.85	Q
5	Germany	Johann Meyer	2:31.43	ELM
6	Spain	Diego Molina	2:23.46	Q
6	Ukraine	Mykola Tomchai	2:32.45	ELM
7	China	Su Juntao	2:23.48	Q
7	Estonia	Steven Runin	2:24.19	ELM
8	Hungary	Adam Moor	2:24.80	Q
8	Austria	Lukas Schoenhuber	2:27.38	ELM

=== Quarterfinals ===
Match	Country	Athlete	Result	Progression
1	Hungary	Adam Moor	2:24.43	Q
1	France	Raphael de Boussac	2:28.42	ELM
2	South Africa	Callum Dreyer	2:24.52	Q
2	Czech Republic	Ondrej Zizka	2:24.66	ELM
3	Egypt	Yossuf Moursi	2:26.09	Q
3	China	Su Juntao	2:29.52	ELM
4	Spain	Diego Molina	2:27.82	Q
4	Italy	Davide Gazzola	2:34.50	ELM

=== Semi-finals ===
Match	Country	Athlete	Result	Progression
1	South Africa	Callum Dreyer	2:29.35	Gold medal race
1	Hungary	Adam Moor	2:46.79	Bronze medal race
2	Spain	Diego Molina	2:45.32	Gold medal race
2	Egypt	Yossuf Moursi	4:08.74	Bronze medal race

=== Final rounds ===
==== Bronze medal race ====
Rank	Country	Athlete	Result	Notes
3rd place, bronze medalist(s)	Hungary	Adam Moor	2:23.57	
4	Egypt	Yossuf Moursi	2:24.20	

==== Gold medal race ====
Rank	Country	Athlete	Result	Notes
1st place, gold medalist(s)	South Africa	Callum Dreyer	2:15.65	
2nd place, silver medalist(s)	Spain	Diego Molina	2:44.39	
