= Athletics at the 2026 Summer Youth Olympics – Men's 200 metres =

Men's 200 metres athletics event at the 2026 Summer Youth Olympics

Men's 200 metres at the IV Summer Youth Olympic Games
- Venue: Complexe Iba Mar Diop
- Date: 10 November
- Competitors: 14 from 14 nations
- Winning time: 21.04 seconds

Medalists
1st place, gold medalist(s)		Ropafadzo Mzondo	Zimbabwe
2nd place, silver medalist(s)		Deuquan' Farrell	Guyana
3rd place, bronze medalist(s)		Pi Durden Wangkay	Philippines

The men's 200 metres event at the 2026 Summer Youth Olympics was held on 10 November at the Complexe Iba Mar Diop in Dakar, Senegal.

== Schedule ==
All times are local (UTC±0).

Date	Time	Round
10 November 2026	15:10	Semifinal 1
10 November 2026	15:17	Semifinal 2
10 November 2026	17:30	Final

== Results ==
=== Phase summary ===
The first four athletes in each semifinal (Q) and the next fastest athlete (q) qualified for the final.

Rank	Bib	Athlete	Nation	Semifinal	Position	Result	Notes
1	495	Ropafadzo Mzondo	Zimbabwe	SF1	1	21.02	Q
2	377	Deuquan' Farrell	Guyana	SF2	1	21.61	Q
3	427	Shikongo Iileka	Namibia	SF1	2	21.87	Q
4	380	Aron Horvath	Hungary	SF2	2	21.90	Q
5	437	Pi Durden Wangkay	Philippines	SF2	3	21.96	Q
6	375	Nikolaos Saliveros	Greece	SF1	3	22.00	Q
7	334	Silvestre Wilfried Yapo	Ivory Coast	SF2	4	22.15	Q
8	321	Md Nazul Putera Faeiz Firdaous	Brunei	SF1	4	22.27	Q
9	475	Chao-Feng Chu	Chinese Taipei	SF2	5	22.36	q
10	371	Walterio Bibang Manuel	Equatorial Guinea	SF1	5	23.51	
11	339	Lucas Delgado	Cape Verde	SF2	6	23.47	
12	338	Frederic Humblot	Comoros	SF1	6	24.52	
13	355	Rachid Rochene	Refugee Olympic Team	SF2	7	24.32	
—	370	Kido Ales	Guinea-Bissau	SF1	—	DQ	TR17.2.3

=== Final ===
The final was held at 17:30. Ropafadzo Mzondo of Zimbabwe won the gold medal in 21.04 seconds. Deuquan' Farrell of Guyana finished second in 21.36 seconds, ahead of Pi Durden Wangkay of the Philippines, who took bronze in the same time. The race was run with a wind reading of −0.2 m/s.

Rank	Lane	Athlete	Nation	Result	Reaction time
1st place, gold medalist(s)	5	Ropafadzo Mzondo	Zimbabwe	21.04	0.184
2nd place, silver medalist(s)	8	Deuquan' Farrell	Guyana	21.36	0.233
3rd place, bronze medalist(s)	9	Pi Durden Wangkay	Philippines	21.36	0.160
4	7	Aron Horvath	Hungary	21.79	0.159
5	6	Shikongo Iileka	Namibia	22.01	0.164
6	3	Nikolaos Saliveros	Greece	22.16	0.155
7	4	Silvestre Wilfried Yapo	Ivory Coast	22.24	0.154
8	2	Md Nazul Putera Faeiz Firdaous	Brunei	22.30	0.149
9	1	Chao-Feng Chu	Chinese Taipei	22.36	0.163
