= Philippines at the 2026 Summer Youth Olympics =

- IOC code: PHI
- NOC: Philippine Olympic Committee
- Website: www.olympic.ph

in Dakar October 31 – November 13, 2026
- Competitors: 9 in 6 sports
- Flag bearers: Jamesray Ajido; Riannah Coleman
- Medals Ranked 54th: Gold 0 Silver 1 Bronze 1 Total 2

Summer Youth Olympics appearances (overview)
- 2010; 2014; 2018; 2026

The Philippines competed at the 2026 Summer Youth Olympics in Dakar, Senegal from 31 October to 13 November 2026. The Philippines attained its best finish in the games, with a silver and bronze medals courtesy of track athletes Naomi Cesar and Pi Durden Wangkay.

== Background ==
The International Olympic Committee (IOC) granted the Philippines nine universality places covering six sports. Sportspeople in athletics, cycling, swimming, gymnastics, windsurfing and wushu were nominated.

Prior to this edition, the Philippines has only won one medal at the Youth Olympics courtesy of sailor Christian Tio in the 2018 Summer Youth Olympics.

Swimmers Jamesray Ajido and Riannah Coleman will be the flagbearers for the Philippine delegation at the opening ceremony.

Naomi Cesar preserved the country's medal streak at the Games with a silver-medal finish in athletics. Pi Durden Wangkay followed suit a day later with a bronze in the same sport. This is the best ever finish of the Philippines in the Summer Youth Olympics.

== Competitors ==
The following is the list of number of competitors participating at the Games per sport/discipline.

Sport	Men	Women	Total
Artistic gymnastics	1	1	2
Athletics	1	1	2
Road cycling	0	1	1
Sailing	1	0	1
Swimming	1	1	2
Wushu	0	1	1
Total	4	5	9

== Medal summary ==
=== Medal table ===
Sport	Gold	Silver	Bronze	Total
Athletics	0	1	1	2
Total	0	1	1	2

=== Medalists ===
The following Filipino competitors won medals at the Youth Olympics.

Medal	Athlete	Sport	Event	Date
Silver	Naomi Cesar	Athletics	Girls' 800 m	9 November
Bronze	Pi Durden Wangkay	Athletics	Boys' 200 m	10 November

== Artistic gymnastics ==
Philippines entered two gymnasts, one male (Hillarion Palles) and one female (Tchelzy Maayo). The two gymnasts competed in the all-around event. Palles, who specializes in the vault, high bar and parallel bars, finished 49th in the all-around qualification round. Maayo finished 36th in her event. She did admit wobbling in the balance beam. Neither athlete advanced to the final round.

Boys

Athlete	Event	Qualification								Final							
Athlete	Event	Apparatus						Total	Rank	Apparatus						Total	Rank
Athlete	Event	F	PH	R	V	PB	HB	Total	Rank	F	PH	R	V	PB	HB	Total	Rank
Hillarion Palles	Boys' all-around	11.733	10.266	10.166	12.266	9.666	11.566	65.663	49	Did not advance							

Girls

Athlete	Event	Qualification						Final					
Athlete	Event	Apparatus				Total	Rank	Apparatus				Total	Rank
Athlete	Event	V	UB	BB	F	Total	Rank	V	UB	BB	F	Total	Rank
Tchelzy Maayo	Girls' all-around	12.633	9.500	10.800	11.466	44.399	36	Did not advance					

== Athletics ==
Philippines entered two athletes, one of each gender.

=== Track & road events ===
Pi Durden Wangkay competed in the 200 metres. He clocked 21.96 seconds which is his season best The time is equivalent to fifth overall in the semifinal, qualifying for the final race.

In the final, Wangkay was not expecting to medal due to his prior time. In the last 10 meters, Wangkay account how he attempted to overcome Deuquan Farrell of Guyana. However, Farrell risked an injury as he lunged to remain ahead of Wangkay. Wangkay finished as a bronze medalist losing the silver to Farrell via a photo finish with him clocking 21.355 second and his closest opponent recording 21.359 seconds.

Men

Athlete	Event	Semifinal		Final	
Athlete	Event	Result	Rank	Result	Rank
Pi Durden Wangkay	200 m	21.96	5 Q	21.355	3rd place, bronze medalist(s)

Naomi Cesar raced in the 800 metres. She recorded a time of 2:20.16 in the semifinals for a sixth overall, qualifying for the final race.

In the final race which preceded Wangkay's, Cesar was out of the top three racers for most of the race, trailing at fourth in the last 100-meters of the race. However she surged late to finish the race with a time of 2:09.34 for a silver medal.

Women

Athlete	Event	Semifinal		Final	
Athlete	Event	Result	Rank	Result	Rank
Naomi Cesar	800 m	2:20.16	6 Q	2:09.34	2nd place, silver medalist(s)

== Road cycling ==
Philippines entered one female athlete. Maritanya Krog is the sole entry. She is joined by national coaches Mark Galedo and Marita Lucas. Krog finished 30th among 42 riders in the road race, and 30th among 41 riders in the time trial.

Women

Athlete	Event	Time	Rank
Maritanya Krog	Road race	1:42:06	31
Maritanya Krog	Time trial	13:33.94	30

== Sailing ==
Philippines entered one male athlete. The Techno 293 was used for the windsurfing event. Jade Justiniane finished sixth in the men's windsurfing after organizers cancelled the 15th and last race due to the absence of wind.

Athlete	Event	Opening Series – Points per Race														Total points	Net points	Final rank
Athlete	Event	1	2	3	4	5	6	7	8	9	10	11	12	13	14	Total points	Net points	Final rank
Jade Justiniane	Men's windsurfing	5	3	1	7	7	7	5	5	(8)	(25)	6	5	6	(12)	102	57	6

== Swimming ==
Philippines qualified two swimmers, one male and one female. Jamesray Ajido and Riannah Coleman were chosen to nominated to represent the country.

Coleman skipped the 100-metres breastroke after she was among the four swimmers who experienced hyperventillation.

Men

Athlete	Event	Heat		Final	
Athlete	Event	Time	Rank	Time	Rank
Jamesray Ajido	50 m freestyle	25.02	26	Did not advance	
Jamesray Ajido	50 m butterfly	25.24	7 Q	25.49	7
Jamesray Ajido	100 m butterfly	56.33	7 Q	55.16	5

Women

Athlete	Event	Heat		Final	
Athlete	Event	Time	Rank	Time	Rank
Riannah Coleman	50 m breaststroke	34.25	9	Did not advance	
Riannah Coleman	100 m breaststroke	DNS		Did not advance	
Riannah Coleman	200 m breaststroke	2:47.64	7 Q	2:45.70	7

== Wushu ==
Philippines entered one female athlete after quotas were assigned by the International Wushu Federation. Angel Polo reached the final but a point deduction due to an error in the Taijishan routine is attributed to her failure to secure a podium finish. Polo finished fifth.

Athlete	Event	Preliminary round				Total Points	Rank	Final				Total Points	Final Rank
Athlete	Event	Taijishan routine		Taijiquan routine		Total Points	Rank	Taijishan routine		Taijiquan routine		Total Points	Final Rank
Athlete	Event	Points	Rank	Points	Rank	Total Points	Rank	Points	Rank	Points	Rank	Total Points	Final Rank
Angel Polo	Girls' taijiquan combined	9.223	3	9.233	3	18.456	3 Q	9.026	6	9.250	3	18.276	5
