= Yemen at the 2026 Summer Youth Olympics =

- Flag of Yemen
- IOC code: YEM
- NOC: Yemen Olympic Committee
- Website: www.nocyemen.org

in Dakar, Senegal October 31, 2026 – November 13, 2026
- Competitors: 2 in 2 sports
- Flag bearer: Abdullah Shumaila
- Medals: Gold 0 Silver 0 Bronze 0 Total 0

Summer Youth Olympics appearances
- 2010; 2014; 2018; 2026

Yemen is scheduled to compete at the 2026 Summer Youth Olympics in Dakar, Senegal from October 31 to November 13, 2026. This will mark Yemen's fourth appearance at the Youth Olympics, after making its debut in 2010.

Swimmer Abdullah Shumaila served as the flag bearers for the opening ceremony.

== Competitors ==
The following is the list of number of competitors participating at the Games per sport/discipline.

Sport	Men	Women	Total
Athletics	1	0	1
Swimming	1	0	1
Total	2	0	1

== Athletics ==
Yemen entered one male athlete.

=== Track & road events ===
Men

Athlete	Event	Heat		Semifinal		Final	
Athlete	Event	Result	Rank	Result	Rank	Result	Rank
Rabea Alsarari	2000 m steeplechase						

== Swimming ==
Yemen entered one male swimmer.

Athlete	Event	Heat		Semifinal		Final	
Athlete	Event	Time	Rank	Time	Rank	Time	Rank
Abdullah Shuumaila	50 m butterlfy						
Abdullah Shuumaila	50 m breaststroke						
