= Laos at the 2026 Summer Youth Olympics =

- Flag of Laos
- IOC code: LAO
- NOC: National Olympic Committee of Lao

in Dakar, Senegal October 31, 2026 – November 13, 2026
- Competitors: 3 in 2 sports
- Flag bearers: Kaylonie Amphonesuh & Thatsanay Khotkhounxap
- Medals: Gold 0 Silver 0 Bronze 0 Total 0

Summer Youth Olympics appearances
- 2010; 2014; 2018; 2026

Laos is scheduled to compete at the 2026 Summer Youth Olympics in Dakar, Senegal from October 31 to November 13, 2026. This will mark Laos's fourth appearance at the Youth Olympics, after making its debut in 2010.

Swimmer Kaylonie Amphonesuh and athlete Thatsanay Khotkhounxap served as the flag bearers for the opening ceremony.

== Competitors ==
The following is the list of number of competitors participating at the Games per sport/discipline.

Sport	Men	Women	Total
Athletics	1	0	1
Swimming	1	1	2
Total	2	1	3

== Athletics ==
Laos entered one male athlete.

=== Track & road events ===
Men

Athlete	Event	Heat		Semifinal		Final	
Athlete	Event	Result	Rank	Result	Rank	Result	Rank
Thatsanay Khotkhounxap	100 m						

== Swimming ==
Laos entered two swimmers, one male and one female.

Athlete	Event	Heat		Semifinal		Final	
Athlete	Event	Time	Rank	Time	Rank	Time	Rank
Jirasak Khammavongkeo	100 m freestyle						
Jirasak Khammavongkeo	50 m butterfly						
Kaylonie Amphonesuh	50 m breaststroke						
Kaylonie Amphonesuh	100 m breaststroke						
Kaylonie Amphonesuh	200 m breaststroke						
