= Botswana at the 2026 Summer Youth Olympics =

- Flag of Botswana
- IOC code: BOT
- NOC: Botswana National Olympic Committee
- Website: www.botswananoc.org

in Dakar, Senegal October 31, 2026 – November 13, 2026
- Competitors: 6 in 4 sports
- Flag bearers: Melodi Saleshando & Aobakwe Geza
- Medals: Gold 0 Silver 0 Bronze 0 Total 0

Summer Youth Olympics appearances
- 2010; 2014; 2018; 2026

Botswana is scheduled to compete at the 2026 Summer Youth Olympics in Dakar, Senegal from October 31 to November 13, 2026. This will mark Botswana's fourth appearance at the Youth Olympics, after making its debut in 2010.

Swimmer Melodi Saleshando and athlete Aobakwe Geza served as the flag bearers for the opening ceremony.

== Competitors ==
The following is the list of number of competitors participating at the Games per sport/discipline.

Sport	Men	Women	Total
Athletics	1	1	2
Boxing	0	1	1
Judo	0	1	1
Swimming	1	1	2
Total	3	4	7

== Athletics ==
Botswana entered two athletes, one of each gender.

Athlete	Event	Semifinal		Final	
Athlete	Event	Result	Rank	Result	Rank
Aobakwe Geza	Men's 400 m				
Mpho Maano	Women's 800 m				

== Boxing ==
Botswana entered one female athlete in the −51 kg category.

Athlete	Weight	Round of 16	Quarterfinals	Semifinals	Final / BM	
Athlete	Weight	Opposition Result	Opposition Result	Opposition Result	Opposition Result	Rank
Precious Masaba	Women's flyweight					

== Judo ==
Botswana entered one female judoka based on the available quotas assigned by the International Judo Federation.

Women

Athlete	Event	Round of 16	Quarterfinals	Semifinals	Repechage 1	Repechage 2	Final	
Athlete	Event	Opposition Result	Opposition Result	Opposition Result	Opposition Result	Opposition Result	Opposition Result	Rank
Theresa Tagarira	Women's –44 kg	Kniazeva (BLR); L 0–100	Did not advance		Tolentino (DOM); W 100–0	Kniazeva (BLR); W 100–10	Aguilar (VEN); L 0–101	5

== Swimming ==
Botswana entered two swimmers, one of each gender.

Athlete	Event	Heat		Final	
Athlete	Event	Time	Rank	Time	Rank
Tema Modirelabangwe	Men's 50 m freestyle	25.71	35	Did not advance	
Tema Modirelabangwe	Men's 50 m backstroke	29.95	24	Did not advance	
Tema Modirelabangwe	Men's 50 m butterfly	27.45	29	Did not advance	
Melodi Saleshando	Women's 50 m freestyle	27.63	19	Did not advance	
Melodi Saleshando	Women's 50 m backstroke	30.87	19	Did not advance	
Melodi Saleshando	Women's 50 m butterfly	29.95	21	Did not advance	
