= Athletics at the 2026 Summer Youth Olympics – Men's 110 metres hurdles =

Athletics event at the 2026 Summer Youth Olympics

Men's 110 metres hurdles at the IV Summer Youth Olympic Games
- Venue: Complexe Iba Mar Diop
- Date: 9 November 2026
- Competitors: 14 from 14 nations
- Winning time: 12.95

Medalists
| 1st place, gold medalist(s) | | Marquies Page | Jamaica |
| 2nd place, silver medalist(s) | | Shijie Chen | China |
| 3rd place, bronze medalist(s) | | Enrique Bosch | South Africa |

The men's 110 metres hurdles event at the 2026 Summer Youth Olympics was held on 9 November at the Complexe Iba Mar Diop in Dakar, Senegal. The competition consisted of semi-finals and a final. Jamaica's Marquies Page won the gold medal in the final with a time of 12.95 seconds.

== Schedule ==
The semi-finals and final were scheduled for 9 November 2026 at the Complexe Iba Mar Diop. The semi-finals began at 15:27, and the final was scheduled for 17:20 local time (UTC).

| Date | Time | Round |
|---|---|---|
| 9 November 2026 | 15:27 | Semi-finals |
| 9 November 2026 | 17:20 | Final |

== Results ==
The competition consisted of two phases, with athletes advancing from the semi-finals to the final. The first four athletes in each semi-final qualified automatically, along with the next fastest athlete.

=== Semi-finals ===
The semi-finals were held on 9 November 2026. The first four athletes in each semi-final qualified by place (Q), while the next fastest athlete qualified by time (q).

==== Phase Summary ====
| Rank | Bib | Athlete | Nation | Semi-final | Position | Result | Notes |
|---|---|---|---|---|---|---|---|
| 1 | 393 | Marquies Page | Jamaica | SF2 | 1 | 13.20 | Q |
| 2 | 451 | Enrique Bosch | South Africa | SF1 | 1 | 13.45 | Q |
| 3 | 328 | Shijie Chen | China | SF2 | 2 | 13.47 | Q |
| 4 | 424 | Brice Tailly | Mauritius | SF1 | 2 | 13.72 | Q, PB |
| 5 | 443 | Eryk Trojnar | Poland | SF1 | 3 | 13.91 | Q |
| 6 | 361 | Andro Jurisson | Estonia | SF2 | 3 | 13.95 | Q |
| 7 | 403 | Naif Alsmairi | Saudi Arabia | SF1 | 4 | 13.99 | Q, PB |
| 8 | 449 | Aboubakar Idriss | Qatar | SF2 | 4 | 14.02 | Q, PB |
| 9 | 466 | Timotej Vozár | Slovakia | SF1 | 5 | 14.06 | q |
| 10 | 306 | Karem Ahmed | Austria | SF1 | 6 | 14.07 | |
| 11 | 379 | Renan Mena | Honduras | SF2 | 5 | 14.09 | PB |
| 12 | 304 | Akram Sek | Algeria | SF2 | 6 | 14.12 | |
| 13 | 310 | Shawne Ferguson | Bahamas | SF2 | 7 | 14.57 | |
| 14 | 301 | Jorgi Kapedani | Albania | SF1 | 7 | 20.52 | PB |

=== Final ===
The final was held on 9 November 2026 at 17:20. The race was run with a headwind of 0.4 metres per second.

| Rank | Lane | Bib | Athlete | Nation | Result | Reaction time | Remark |
|---|---|---|---|---|---|---|---|
| 1st place, gold medalist(s) | 4 | 393 | Marquies Page | Jamaica | 12.95 | 0.177 | PB |
| 2nd place, silver medalist(s) | 6 | 328 | Shijie Chen | China | 13.40 | 0.197 | PB |
| 3rd place, bronze medalist(s) | 5 | 451 | Enrique Bosch | South Africa | 13.45 | 0.198 | |
| 4 | 8 | 361 | Andro Jurisson | Estonia | 13.70 | 0.205 | SB |
| 5 | 2 | 403 | Naif Alsmairi | Saudi Arabia | 13.70 | 0.180 | PB |
| 6 | 9 | 449 | Aboubakar Idriss | Qatar | 13.96 | 0.193 | PB |
| 7 | 7 | 424 | Brice Tailly | Mauritius | 13.98 | 0.193 | |
| 8 | 3 | 443 | Eryk Trojnar | Poland | 14.08 | 0.185 | |
| 9 | 1 | 466 | Timotej Vozár | Slovakia | 14.12 | 0.166 | |
