= Athletics at the 2026 Summer Youth Olympics – Women's 1500 metres =

Women's 1500 metres athletics event at the 2026 Summer Youth Olympics

Women's 1500 metres at the IV Summer Youth Olympic Games
- Venue: Complexe Iba Mar Diop
- Date: 10 November
- Competitors: 14 from 14 nations
- Winning time: 4:28.02

Medalists
| 1st place, gold medalist(s) | | Elsabet Amare | Ethiopia |
| 2nd place, silver medalist(s) | | Abigael Chepkirui | Kenya |
| 3rd place, bronze medalist(s) | | Kanari Estifanos | Eritrea |

The women's 1500 metres event at the 2026 Summer Youth Olympics was held on 10 November at the Complexe Iba Mar Diop in Dakar, Senegal.

== Schedule ==
All times are in local time (UTC+0).

| Date | Time | Round |
|---|---|---|
| 10 November 2026 | 14:30 | Final |

== Results ==
=== Final ===
The final was held on 10 November 2026.

| Rank | Bib | Athlete | Nation | Result | Remark |
|---|---|---|---|---|---|
| 1st place, gold medalist(s) | 163 | Elsabet Amare | Ethiopia | 4:28.02 | |
| 2nd place, silver medalist(s) | 197 | Abigael Chepkirui | Kenya | 4:29.86 | |
| 3rd place, bronze medalist(s) | 153 | Kanari Estifanos | Eritrea | 4:31.10 | |
| 4 | 247 | Lara Stander | South Africa | 4:31.50 | |
| 5 | 283 | Baskaline Cherotwo | Uganda | 4:33.75 | |
| 6 | 179 | Sara Fekete | Hungary | 4:36.97 | |
| 7 | 108 | Irene Pernia | Argentina | 4:39.55 | |
| 8 | 117 | Nicole Herdy | Brazil | 4:39.56 | |
| 9 | 214 | Salma Maataoui | Morocco | 4:41.20 | SB |
| 10 | 144 | Hibo Ismael Houssein | Djibouti | 4:44.91 | PB |
| 11 | 287 | Munavvar Holtorayeva | Uzbekistan | 5:05.73 | PB |
| 12 | 200 | Ayana Beishenalieva | Kyrgyzstan | 5:27.33 | PB |
| 13 | 231 | Nana Farida Zakari Yaou Ibrahim | Niger | 5:30.32 | PB |
| 14 | 123 | Pisey An | Cambodia | 5:44.99 | PB |
