= Pakistan at the 2026 Summer Youth Olympics =

- Flag of Pakistan
- IOC code: PAK
- NOC: Pakistan Olympic Association
- Website: www.nocpakistan.org

in Dakar, Senegal October 31, 2026 – November 13, 2026
- Competitors: 3 in 2 sports
- Flag bearer: Daniyal Hatim
- Medals: Gold 0 Silver 0 Bronze 0 Total 0

Summer Youth Olympics appearances
- 2010; 2014; 2018; 2026

Pakistan competed at the 2026 Summer Youth Olympics in Dakar, Senegal from 31 October to 13 November 2026. This marked Pakistan's fourth appearance at the Summer Youth Olympics, after making its debut in 2010.

Swimmer Daniyal Hatim served as the flag bearers for the opening ceremony.

== Competitors ==
The following is the list of number of competitors participating at the Games per sport/discipline.

Sport	Men	Women	Total
Athletics	1	0	1
Swimming	1	1	2
Total	2	1	3

== Athletics ==
Pakistan entered one male athlete.

=== Field events ===
Men

Athlete	Event	Qualification		Final	
Athlete	Event	Distance	Position	Distance	Position
Shahzain Safdar	Discus throw	—N/a		35.56	8

== Swimming ==
Pakistan entered two swimmers, one male and one female.

Athlete	Event	Heat		Semifinal		Final	
Athlete	Event	Time	Rank	Time	Rank	Time	Rank
Daniyal Hatim	50 m freestyle						
Daniyal Hatim	50 m butterfly						
Daniyal Hatim	100 m butterfly	58.00	12	Did not advance			
Hareem Malik	50 m breaststroke						
Hareem Malik	50 m butterfly	32.77	34	Did not advance			
