= Wushu at the 2026 Summer Youth Olympics – Men's changquan combined =

Men's changquan combined at the 2026 Summer Youth Olympics
- Venue: Dakar Expo Center
- Dates: 1–3 November
- Competitors: 12 from 12 nations
- Winning score: 18.796

Medalists
gold medal	Lin Yilei	China
silver medal	Asael Rondonuwu	Indonesia
bronze medal	Arash Pahali	Iran

The men's changquan combined event at the 2026 Summer Youth Olympics took place from 1 to 3 November at the Dakar Expo Center in Dakar, Senegal.

== Results ==
=== Preliminary round ===
The preliminary round determined the top eight competitors who advanced to the final stage based on their combined scores from the changquan and gunshu routines.

Rank	Athlete	Nationality	Changquan		Gunshu		Total	Notes
Rank	Athlete	Nationality	Score	Rank	Score	Rank	Total	Notes
1	Lin Yilei	China	9.390	1	9.390	1	18.780	Q
2	Asael Rondonuwu	Indonesia	9.300	2	9.313	2	18.613	Q
3	Lee Yoon-sang	South Korea	9.263	3	9.143	3	18.406	Q
4	Natnael Hagos	Ethiopia	9.240	4	9.040	6	18.280	Q
5	Arash Pahali	Iran	9.133	5	9.093	4	18.226	Q
6	Artem Bliushke	Russia	9.080	6	9.046	5	18.126	Q
7	Robbe Asselman	Belgium	8.406	8	8.576	7	16.982	Q
8	Renato Silva	Chile	8.013	9	8.310	8	16.323	Q
9	Francois Mugisha	Rwanda	7.966	10	7.863	9	15.829	
10	Mahamadou Abdoulaye Eggoh	Niger	7.806	11	7.580	10	15.346	
11	Vincent Olsson	Sweden	8.423	7	DNS	–	8.423	
12	Chehem Abdallah Yasso	Djibouti	6.266	12	DNS	–	6.266	

=== Final ===
Rank	Athlete	Nationality	Changquan		Gunshu		Total
Rank	Athlete	Nationality	Score	Rank	Score	Rank	Total
1st place, gold medalist(s)	Lin Yilei	China	9.393	1	9.403	1	18.796
2nd place, silver medalist(s)	Asael Rondonuwu	Indonesia	9.353	2	9.356	2	18.709
3rd place, bronze medalist(s)	Arash Pahali	Iran	9.310	4	9.293	4	18.603
4	Lee Yoon-sang	South Korea	9.130	6	9.340	3	18.470
5	Natnael Hagos	Ethiopia	9.313	3	9.100	5	18.413
6	Artem Bliushke	Russia	9.196	5	9.023	6	18.219
7	Renato Silva	Chile	8.910	7	8.443	8	17.353
8	Robbe Asselman	Belgium	8.623	8	8.446	7	17.069
