= Swimming at the 2026 Summer Youth Olympics – Men's 100 metre butterfly =

Men's 100 metre butterfly at the 2026 Summer Youth Olympics
- Venue: Complexe Tour de l'Oeuf
- Dates: 1 November
- Competitors: 30 from 30 nations
- Winning time: 52.16

Medalists
gold medal	Zain Hesham	Egypt
silver medal	Aleksej Kalanj	Serbia
bronze medal	Matiáš Krištof	Slovakia

The men's 100 metre butterfly event at the 2026 Summer Youth Olympics took place on 1 November at the Complexe Tour de l'Oeuf in Dakar, Senegal.

== Results ==
=== Heats ===
The heats were started at 10:48. The eight fastest swimmers qualified for the final.

Rank	Heat	Lane	Name	Nationality	Time	Notes
1	4	4	Zain Ali	Egypt	53.96	Q
2	2	4	Matiáš Krištof	Slovakia	54.68	Q
3	4	5	Tirthank Pegu	India	55.15	Q
4	3	4	Aleksej Kalanj	Serbia	55.16	Q
5	3	3	Salaheddine Torki	Algeria	55.97	Q
6	4	6	Jeremy Rieck	Kenya	56.14	Q
7	3	5	Jamesray Mishael Ajido	Philippines	56.33	Q
8	4	3	Zdeněk Procházka	Czech Republic	56.38	Q
9	2	3	Dương Văn Hoàng Quy	Vietnam	56.78	R
10	4	7	Alexander Andrason	Iceland	56.82	R
11	2	5	Giovanni Krismer	Austria	57.08	
12	4	2	Daniyal Hatim	Pakistan	58.00	
13	1	4	Jude Christophe Jerome	Haiti	58.05	
14	3	1	Tendry Rakotobe	Madagascar	58.06	
15	3	2	Victor Ashby	Barbados	58.07	
16	3	6	Reynard Delian Purwanto	Indonesia	58.24	
17	4	1	Ocean van Loon	Aruba	58.77	
18	2	6	Lorenzo Esterhuizen	Namibia	58.81	
19	2	8	Aidan Dumuje-Abili	Nigeria	59.73	
20	2	7	Vladimir Varosyan	Armenia	1:00.06	
21	2	1	Espriit Shaw	Antigua and Barbuda	1:00.07	
22	3	7	Mulenga Cole	Zambia	1:00.08	
23	3	8	Sean-Verno Dipokromo	Suriname	1:00.31	
24	4	8	Seif Elshekh	Dominica	1:00.97	
25	2	2	Jacob Collymore	Grenada	1:01.07	
26	1	5	Nejc Kranjc	Slovenia	1:02.28	
27	1	6	Sheja Murenzi	Rwanda	1:03.89	
28	1	3	Ali El Wafa Younes	Comoros	1:06.84	
29	1	2	Dagim Kiros Habte	Ethiopia	1:09.16	
30	1	7	Erik Gonsalves	Guyana	1:19.06	

=== Final ===
The final was held on 1 November.

Rank	Lane	Name	Nationality	Time	Notes
1st place, gold medalist(s)	4	Zain Ali	Egypt	52.16	
2nd place, silver medalist(s)	6	Aleksej Kalanj	Serbia	54.03	
3rd place, bronze medalist(s)	5	Matiáš Krištof	Slovakia	54.71	
4	3	Tirthank Pegu	India	54.98	
5	1	Jamesray Mishael Ajido	Philippines	55.16	
6	7	Jeremy Rieck	Kenya	55.51	
7	8	Zdeněk Procházka	Czech Republic	55.69	
8	2	Salaheddine Torki	Algeria	56.12	
