= Athletics at the 2026 Summer Youth Olympics – Women's high jump =

Women's high jump athletics event at the 2026 Summer Youth Olympics

Women's high jump at the IV Summer Youth Olympic Games
- Venue: Complexe Iba Mar Diop
- Date: 10 November
- Competitors: 8 from 8 nations
- Winning time: 1.80 m

Medalists
1st place, gold medalist(s)		Yasmeen Roy	Kuwait
2nd place, silver medalist(s)		Milan Blignaut	South Africa
3rd place, bronze medalist(s)		Malia Housen	Jamaica

The women's high jump event at the 2026 Summer Youth Olympics was held on 10 November at the Complexe Iba Mar Diop in Dakar, Senegal. The competition consisted of a single final phase, as is the format for field events at the Games.

Kuwait's Yasmeen Roy won the gold medal with a best clearance of 1.80 metres. Milan Blignaut of South Africa finished second with 1.74 metres, while Malia Housen of Jamaica took the bronze medal with 1.71 metres.

== Schedule ==
The final was held on 10 November at 16:22 local time (UTC±0).

Date	Time	Round
10 November	16:22	Final

== Results ==
=== Final ===
The final began at 16:23 and concluded at 17:43. The competition was held in sunny conditions, with a temperature of 34 °C.

Rank	Bib	Athlete	Nation	1.55	1.60	1.64	1.68	1.71	1.74	1.76	1.78	1.80	1.82	Result	Remark
1st place, gold medalist(s)	204	Yasmeen Roy	Kuwait	–	–	o	o	o	xo	xo	xo	xo	xxx	1.80	PB
2nd place, silver medalist(s)	243	Milan Blignaut	South Africa	–	o	o	o	xo	xo	xx–	x	–	–	1.74	
3rd place, bronze medalist(s)	192	Malia Housen	Jamaica	o	o	o	xo	o	xxx	–	–	–	–	1.71	
4	285	Anastasiia Kovalchuk	Ukraine	–	o	o	o	xxx	–	–	–	–	–	1.68	
5	159	Lisell Laul	Estonia	–	o	o	xxo	xx–	x	–	–	–	–	1.68	
6	271	Chiao-Ting Chen	Chinese Taipei	o	xo	o	xxx	–	–	–	–	–	–	1.64	=SB
6	146	Geraldine Rebeca Pata	Ecuador	–	xo	o	xxx	–	–	–	–	–	–	1.64	
8	140	Daniselis Reyes	Cuba	o	xxx	–	–	–	–	–	–	–	–	1.55	PB
