= Aruba at the 2026 Summer Youth Olympics =

- Flag of Aruba
- IOC code: ARU
- NOC: Aruban Olympic Committee
- Website: www.olympicaruba.com

in Dakar, Senegal October 31, 2026 – November 13, 2026
- Competitors: 3 in 2 sports
- Flag bearers: Mikaela van Den Berg & Ocean R van Loon
- Medals: Gold 0 Silver 0 Bronze 0 Total 0

Summer Youth Olympics appearances
- 2010; 2014; 2018; 2026

Aruba is scheduled to compete at the 2026 Summer Youth Olympics in Dakar, Senegal from October 31 to November 13, 2026. This will mark Aruba's fourth appearance at the Youth Olympics, after making its debut in 2010.

Swimmers Mikaela van Den Berg and Ocean R van Loon served as the flag bearers for the opening ceremony.

== Competitors ==
The following is the list of number of competitors participating at the Games per sport/discipline.

Sport	Men	Women	Total
Athletics	1	0	1
Swimming	1	1	2
Total	2	1	3

== Athletics ==
Aruba entered one male athlete.

=== Track & road events ===
Men

Athlete	Event	Heat		Semifinal		Final	
Athlete	Event	Result	Rank	Result	Rank	Result	Rank
Eden Antersyn	1500 m						

== Swimming ==
Aruba entered two swimmers, one male and one female.

Athlete	Event	Heat		Semifinal		Final	
Athlete	Event	Time	Rank	Time	Rank	Time	Rank
Ocean R van Loon	50 m backstroke						
Ocean R van Loon	100 m backstroke						
Ocean R van Loon	100 m butterfly						
Ocean R van Loon	200 m butterfly						
Mikaela van den Berg	50 m freestyle						
Mikaela van den Berg	100 m freestyle						
Mikaela van den Berg	50 m butterfly						
Mikaela van den Berg	50 m backstroke						
