= Grenada at the 2026 Summer Youth Olympics =

- Flag of Grenada
- IOC code: GRN
- NOC: The Grenada Olympic Committee

in Dakar, Senegal October 31, 2026 – November 13, 2026
- Competitors: 3 in 2 sports
- Flag bearers: Cayla Christopher & Jacob Collymore
- Medals: Gold 0 Silver 0 Bronze 0 Total 0

Summer Youth Olympics appearances
- 2010; 2014; 2018; 2026

Grenada is scheduled to compete at the 2026 Summer Youth Olympics in Dakar, Senegal from October 31 to November 13, 2026. This will mark Grenada's fourth appearance at the Youth Olympics, after making its debut in 2010.

Athlete Cayla Christopher and swimmer Jacob Collymore served as the flag bearers for the opening ceremony.

== Competitors ==
The following is the list of number of competitors participating at the Games per sport/discipline.

Sport	Men	Women	Total
Athletics	0	1	1
Swimming	1	1	2
Total	1	2	3

== Athletics ==
Grenada entered one female athlete.

=== Field events ===
Women

Athlete	Event	Qualification		Final	
Athlete	Event	Distance	Position	Distance	Position
Cayla Christopher	Long jump				

== Swimming ==
Grenada entered two swimmers, one male and one female.

Athlete	Event	Heat		Semifinal		Final	
Athlete	Event	Time	Rank	Time	Rank	Time	Rank
Jacob Collymore	100 m freestyle						
Jacob Collymore	50 m butterfly						
Jacob Collymore	100 m butterfly						
Kristin Gresham	50 m backstroke						
Kristin Gresham	100 m backstroke						
Kristin Gresham	50 m breaststroke						
Kristin Gresham	100 m breaststroke						
