= Athletics at the 2026 Summer Youth Olympics – Men's long jump =

Athletics event at the 2026 Summer Youth Olympics

Men's long jump at the IV Summer Youth Olympic Games
- Venue: Complexe Iba Mar Diop
- Date: 8 November
- Competitors: 8 from 8 nations

Medalists
1st place, gold medalist(s)		Koki Hasebe	Japan
2nd place, silver medalist(s)		Stiliyan Orlinov	Bulgaria
3rd place, bronze medalist(s)		Ibrahim Sawadogo	Burkina Faso

The men's long jump event at the 2026 Summer Youth Olympics was held on 8 November at the Complexe Iba Mar Diop in Dakar, Senegal. Japan's Koki Hasebe won the gold medal with a jump of 7.45 metres. Stiliyan Orlinov of Bulgaria won the silver medal with 7.30 metres, while Ibrahim Sawadogo of Burkina Faso took bronze with 7.23 metres.

== Schedule ==
All times are local (West Africa Time, UTC+0).

Date	Time	Round
8 November 2026	16:15	Final

== Results ==
=== Final ===
The final was held on 8 November 2026. Each athlete was allowed six attempts, with the best valid jump determining the final ranking. Wind readings are given in metres per second.

Rank	Bib	Athlete	Nation	1	2	3	4	5	6	Result	Note
1	395	Koki Hasebe	Japan	7.15 (+1.0)	x (+1.4)	7.40 (+1.9)	7.34 (+0.8)	7.45 (+0.3)	x (0.0)	7.45 (+0.3)	
2	323	Stiliyan Orlinov	Bulgaria	7.24 (+1.2)	x (+1.3)	x (+2.1)	x (+0.5)	7.30 (+2.4)	7.29 (-1.1)	7.30 (+2.4)	
3	324	Ibrahim Sawadogo	Burkina Faso	6.73 (+0.1) =PB	7.09 (+2.8)	7.23 (+0.3)	6.83 (+0.5)	7.21 (+1.3)	7.14 (+1.6)	7.23 (+0.3)	
4	388	Bruelsino Randriamikasa	Italy	6.89 (+1.6)	6.97 (0.0)	7.13 (+0.1)	6.78 (+0.2)	x (+1.5)	6.78 (+0.5)	7.13 (+0.1)	
5	474	Emmanuel Tchaye	Togo	x (+0.8)	x (+2.2)	5.88 (+1.3)	x (-1.0)	x (+1.7)	6.51 (-1.5)	6.51 (-1.5)	PB
6	465	Leyon Cyrus	Suriname	6.38 (+0.3)	6.34 (+1.7)	4.29 (+1.4)	6.04 (-1.0)	6.23 (+1.0)	6.40 (+0.3)	6.40 (+0.3)	PB
7	345	Jaden Joseph	Dominica	6.31 (-0.3)	x (+0.9)	4.84 (+1.7)	x (+0.5)	x (+1.6)	x (+0.1)	6.31 (-0.3)	
8	401	Ritencooper Kobebe	Kiribati	x (-1.4)	x (+2.2)	5.86 (+1.5)	5.53 (-0.8)	5.55 (+1.5)	5.77 (+1.4)	5.86 (+1.5)	PB

The symbol x indicates a failed attempt. PB denotes a personal best, while =PB denotes an attempt equal to an athlete's personal best.
