= Vanuatu at the 2026 Summer Youth Olympics =

- Flag of Vanuatu
- IOC code: VAN
- NOC: Vanuatu Association of Sports and National Olympic Committee

in Dakar, Senegal October 31, 2026 – November 13, 2026
- Competitors: 3 in 2 sports
- Flag bearers: Chloe Ameara & Teva Chabod
- Medals: Gold 0 Silver 0 Bronze 0 Total 0

Summer Youth Olympics appearances
- 2010; 2014; 2018; 2026

Vanuatu is scheduled to compete at the 2026 Summer Youth Olympics in Dakar, Senegal from October 31 to November 13, 2026. This will mark Vanuatu's fourth appearance at the Youth Olympics, after making its debut in 2010.

Swimmer Chloe Ameara and rower Teva Chabod served as the flag bearers for the opening ceremony.

== Competitors ==
The following is the list of number of competitors participating at the Games per sport/discipline.

Sport	Men	Women	Total
Coastal rowing	1	0	1
Swimming	1	1	2
Total	2	1	3

== Coastal rowing ==
Vanuatu entered one male rower.

Athlete	Event	Qualification		Round of 16	Quarterfinal	Semifinal	Final	
Athlete	Event	Time	Rank	Opposition Time	Opposition Time	Opposition Time	Opposition Time	Rank
Teva Chabod	Men's solo	3:14.42	30	did not advance	did not advance	did not advance	did not advance	30

== Swimming ==
Vanuatu entered two swimmers, one male and one female.

Athlete	Event	Heat		Final	
Athlete	Event	Time	Rank	Time	Rank
Remy Ideder	Men's 100 m freestyle				
Remy Ideder	Men's 50 m backstroke				
Remy Ideder	Men's 100 m backstroke				
Remy Ideder	Men's 200 m individual medley				
Chloe Ameara	Women's 50 m freestyle				
Chloe Ameara	Women's 50 m backstroke				
Chloe Ameara	Women's 100 m backstroke				
Chloe Ameara	Women's 50 m breaststroke				
