= Gift Okunrobo =

Spanish athlete (born 2009)

Personal information
- Born: 14 June 2009 (age 17)

Sport
- Sport: Athletics
- Events: Long jump, Triple jump
Medal record
Women's athletics
Representing Spain
Youth Olympic Games
Gold medal – first place	2026 Dakar	Triple jump
European U18 Championships
Bronze medal – third place	2026 Rieti	Triple jump
Bronze medal – third place	2026 Rieti	Long jump

Gift Okunrobo (born 14 June 2009) is a Spanish long jumper and triple jumper. She won the gold medal in the triple jump at the 2026 Summer Youth Olympics.

== Career ==
From Berriozar, Navarre, Okunrobo initially started in athletics by participating in hurdles and sprint events before transitioning into the lateral jumping events at the age of 16 years-old.

Okunrobo won both the long jump and triple jump at the 2026 Spanish U18 Championships, both indoors and outdoors. She was a double medallist at the European Athletics U18 Championships in Italy, winning bronze in the long jump with a jump of 6.21 metres and a bronze medal in the triple jump with 13.23 metres. She won the gold in the women's triple jump with a jump of 12.69 m at the 2026 Summer Youth Olympics in Dakar, in November 2026.

== Personal life ==
Okunrobo is of Nigerian descent.
