= Athletics at the 2026 Summer Youth Olympics – Women's triple jump =

Athletics event at the 2026 Summer Youth Olympics

Women's triple jump at the IV Summer Youth Olympic Games
- Venue: Complexe Iba Mar Diop
- Date: 8 November
- Competitors: 8 from 8 nations

Medalists
1st place, gold medalist(s)		Gift Okunrobo	Spain
2nd place, silver medalist(s)		Amelia Ioana Negulescu	Romania
3rd place, bronze medalist(s)		Zalissa Zongo	Burkina Faso

The women's triple jump competition at the 2026 Summer Youth Olympics was held on 8 November at the Complexe Iba Mar Diop in Dakar, Senegal.

== Schedule ==
All times are in local time (UTC).

Date	Time	Round
Sunday, 8 November 2026	14:10	Final
Sunday, 8 November 2026	16:03	Victory ceremony

== Results ==
=== Final ===
The final consisted of eight athletes, each competing in six attempts. The athlete with the longest valid jump won the event. The best valid mark from each athlete determined the final ranking.

Rank	Athlete	Nation	1	2	3	4	5	6	Result	Remark
1st place, gold medalist(s)	Gift Okunrobo	Spain	11.79	12.22	12.42	x	x	12.69	12.69	
2nd place, silver medalist(s)	Amelia Ioana Negulescu	Romania	x	x	12.34	x	12.66	12.67	12.67	PB
3rd place, bronze medalist(s)	Zalissa Zongo	Burkina Faso	12.47	12.50	12.67	–	x	x	12.67	
4	Zavien Bernard	Jamaica	12.57	12.29	x	12.12	12.21	12.36	12.57	
5	Hala Khadidja Mefti	Algeria	12.03	12.43	12.10	11.66	x	12.35	12.43	
6	Niko Nozawa	Japan	12.33	x	11.96	x	x	12.20	12.33	
7	Greta San Martini	San Marino	x	11.19	11.20	11.61	x	x	11.61	PB
8	Sokhna Fatoumata Toure	Senegal	x	11.16	x	x	11.56	x	11.56	PB
