= Burkina Faso at the 2026 Summer Youth Olympics =

- Flag of Burkina Faso
- IOC code: BUR
- NOC: Burkinabé National Olympic and Sports Committee
- Website: www.coa.dz

in Dakar, Senegal October 31, 2026 – November 13, 2026
- Competitors: 6 in 3 sports
- Flag bearers: Stephanie Guigma & Irfan Alexandre Bamba
- Medals Ranked 85th: Gold 0 Silver 0 Bronze 2 Total 2

Summer Youth Olympics appearances
- 2010; 2014; 2018; 2026

Burkina Faso is scheduled to compete at the 2026 Summer Youth Olympics in Dakar, Senegal from October 31 to November 13, 2026. This will mark Burkina Faso's fourth appearance at the Youth Olympics, after making its debut in 2010.

Swimmers Stephanie Guigma and Irfan Alexandre Bamba served as the flag bearers for the opening ceremony.

== Competitors ==
The following is the list of number of competitors participating at the Games per sport/discipline.

Sport	Men	Women	Total
Athletics	1	2	3
Fencing	0	1	1
Swimming	1	1	2
Total	2	4	6

== Athletics ==
Burkina Faso entered two athletes, one of each gender.

Track events

Athlete	Event	Semifinal		Final	
Athlete	Event	Result	Rank	Result	Rank
Gisele Sanou	Women's 100 m hurdles	14.21	5 Q	14.57	9

Field events

Athlete	Event	Final	
Athlete	Event	Distance	Rank
Ibrahim Sawadogo	Men's long jump	7.23	3rd place, bronze medalist(s)
Zalissa Zongo	Women's triple jump	12.67	3rd place, bronze medalist(s)

== Fencing ==
Burkina Faso entered one female athlete.

Athlete	Event	Round of 64	Round of 32	Round of 16	Quarterfinal	Semifinal	Final / BM	
Athlete	Event	Opposition Score	Opposition Score	Opposition Score	Opposition Score	Opposition Score	Opposition Score	Rank
Prisca Kinda	Women's sabre							

== Swimming ==
Burkina Faso entered two swimmers, one of each gender.

Athlete	Event	Heat		Final	
Athlete	Event	Time	Rank	Time	Rank
Irfaan Alexandre Bamba	Men's 50 m freestyle	29.20	50	Did not advance	
Irfaan Alexandre Bamba	Men's 50 m breaststroke	39.39	31	Did not advance	
Stéphanie Guigma	Women's 50 m freestyle	36.14	66	Did not advance	
Stéphanie Guigma	Women's 50 m breaststroke	DSQ		Did not advance	
