= Elsabet Amare =

Ethiopian middle-distance runner (born 2009)

Personal information
- Born: 23 February 2009 (age 17)

Sport
- Sport: Athletics
- Event: Middle-distance running
Medal record
Women's athletics
Representing Ethiopia
Youth Olympic Games
Gold medal – first place	2026 Dakar	1500 m
African U18 Championships
Gold medal – first place	2025 Abeokuta	800 m

Elsabet Amare (born 23 February 2009) is an Ethiopian middle-distance runner.

== Career ==
Amare grew up in Injibara, a town in the Awi zone of Ethiopia’s Amhara region. Her father was a keen fan of athletic and she was inspired by watching Ethiopian great Meseret Defar.

Amare ran a personal best of 4:08.10 for the 1500 metres in placing fifth at the World Athletics Continental Tour Gold event the Maurie Plant Meet in Melbourne, Australia. She placed sixth in 4:08.97 in the 1500 metres at the 2025 Doha Diamond League on 16 May 2025. In July 2025, she ran 2:02.96 to win the women's 800 metres at the African U18 Championships in Nigeria.

Amare ran 4:05.38 to place fifth over 1500 metres at the New Balance Indoor Grand Prix on 24 January 2026. The following week, she was runner-up to Katie Snowden in the women's invitational 3000 m at the BU Terrier Classic in Boston on 30 January 2026. Amare ran 4:01.32 for the 1500 metres in Montreuil, France, in June, and was selected to represent Ethiopia at the 2026 World Athletics U20 Championships, where she placed fourth in the final of the 1500 metres. She was selected for the 2026 Youth Olympic Games in Dakar, Senegal, winning the gold medal in the 1500 metres.
