= Athletics at the 2026 Summer Youth Olympics – Men's shot put =

Athletics event at the 2026 Summer Youth Olympics

Men's shot put at the IV Summer Youth Olympic Games
- Venue: Complexe Iba Mar Diop
- Date: 9 November 2026
- Competitors: 7 from 7 nations
- Winning time: 19.79 m

Medalists
1st place, gold medalist(s)		Pyetro Henrico Souza	Brazil
2nd place, silver medalist(s)		Xhaevion Kelly	Jamaica
3rd place, bronze medalist(s)		Darius Botha	South Africa

The men's shot put event at the 2026 Summer Youth Olympics was held on 9 November 2026 at the Complexe Iba Mar Diop in Dakar, Senegal. The event was contested as a single final.

== Schedule ==
The competition was held on 9 November, with the final starting at 14:32 local time (UTC).

Date	Time	Round
9 November 2026	14:32	Final

== Results ==
The shot put competition consisted of a single final, in accordance with the official competition format for field events.

=== Final ===
The final was held on 9 November 2026 at 14:32.

Rank	Bib	Athlete	Nation	1	2	3	4	5	6	Result	Remark
1st place, gold medalist(s)	319	Pyetro Henrico Souza	Brazil	18.25	19.02	18.92	19.79	19.74	18.90	19.79	
2nd place, silver medalist(s)	391	Xhaevion Kelly	Jamaica	x	19.34	19.02	19.05	x	18.46	19.34	PB
3rd place, bronze medalist(s)	452	Darius Botha	South Africa	17.52	x	19.23	x	x	18.84	19.23	
4	402	Soohwan Lee	South Korea	17.92	x	18.67	17.84	19.15	18.76	19.15	PB
5	462	Petar Cvokic	Serbia	16.36	17.18	x	15.05	x	16.47	17.18	PB
6	470	Halafihi Ofeina Ehe Langi Fisiih oi	Tonga	14.51	15.45	x	x	x	x	15.45	PB
7	459	Donald Aba	Solomon Islands	9.92	10.11	10.49	9.79	10.15	10.09	10.49	PB
