= Barbados at the 2026 Summer Youth Olympics =

- IOC code: BAR
- NOC: Barbados Olympic Association
- Website: www.olympic.org.bb

in Dakar, Senegal 31 October – 13 November 2026
- Competitors: 3 in 3 sports
- Flag bearers: Deann Walton & Victor Ashby
- Medals: Gold 0 Silver 0 Bronze 0 Total 0

Summer Youth Olympics appearances
- 2010; 2014; 2018; 2026

Barbados is scheduled to participate at the 2026 Summer Youth Olympics in Dakar, Senegal from 31 October to 13 November 2026. This will mark Barbados' fourth appearance at the Youth Olympics, after making its debut in 2010.

Judoka Deann Walton and swimmer Victor Ashby served as the flag bearers for the opening ceremony.

== Competitors ==
The following is the list of number of competitors participating at the Games.

Sport	Men	Women	Total
Judo	0	1	1
Swimming	1	0	1
Triathlon	0	1	1
Total	1	2	3

== Judo ==
Barbados entered one female judoka based on the available quotas assigned by the International Judo Federation.

Women

Athlete	Event	Round of 16	Quarterfinals	Semifinals	Repechage	Final / BM	
Athlete	Event	Opposition Result	Opposition Result	Opposition Result	Opposition Result	Opposition Result	Rank
Deann Walton	−52 kg						

== Swimming ==
Barbados entered two swimmers, one male and one female.

Men

Athlete	Event	Heat		Semifinal		Final	
Athlete	Event	Time	Rank	Time	Rank	Time	Rank
Victor Ashby	100 m butterfly	58.07	15	N/A	N/A	did not advance	did not advance

== Triathlon ==
Barbados entered one female athlete.

Athlete	Event	Swim (750m)	Trans 1	Bike (20km)	Trans 2	Run (5km)	Total Time	Rank
Alexis Lashley	Women's individual							
