= Indonesia at the 2026 Summer Youth Olympics =

- IOC code: INA
- NOC: Indonesian Olympic Committee
- Website: nocindonesia.id

in Dakar, Senegal 31 October – 13 November 2026
- Competitors: 12 in 9 sports
- Flag bearers: Michelle Surjadi Fang; Nusrtdinov Zayan Fatih
- Medals Ranked 67th: Gold 0 Silver 1 Bronze 2 Total 3

Summer Youth Olympics appearances (overview)
- 2010; 2014; 2018; 2026

Indonesia participated at the 2026 Summer Youth Olympics in Dakar, Senegal from 31 October to 13 November 2026. This will mark Indonesia's fourth appearance at the Youth Olympics, after making its debut in 2010.

A final team of 12 athletes (6 men and 6 women) competing in nine sports was named by the Indonesian Olympic Committee on 23 October 2026. Swimmer Michelle Surjadi Fang and equestrian Nusrtdinov Zayan Fatih served as the flag bearers for the opening ceremony.

== Medalists ==
Medal	Name	Sport	Event	Date
Silver	Asael Rondonuwu	Wushu	Men's changquan combined	3 November
Bronze	Sashenka Fatimah	Judo	Women's 63 kg	2 November
Bronze	Michelle Surjadi Fang	Swimming	Women's 200 m butterfly	6 November

=== Medal by sport ===
Sport	1st place, gold medalist(s)	2nd place, silver medalist(s)	3rd place, bronze medalist(s)	Total
Wushu	0	1	0	1
Judo	0	0	1	1
Swimming	0	0	1	1
Total	0	1	2	3

=== Medal by gender ===
Gender	1st place, gold medalist(s)	2nd place, silver medalist(s)	3rd place, bronze medalist(s)	Total
Girls	0	0	2	2
Boys	0	1	0	1
Total	0	1	2	3

== Competitors ==
The following is the list of number of competitors participating at the Games per sport/discipline.

Sport	Men	Women	Total
Athletics	0	1	1
Badminton	1	1	2
Equestrian	1	0	1
Judo	0	1	1
Road cycling	1	1	2
Skateboarding	1	0	1
Swimming	1	1	2
Triathlon	0	1	1
Wushu	1	0	1
Total	6	6	12

== Athletics ==
Indonesia entered one female athlete.

Athlete	Event	Semifinal		Final	
Athlete	Event	Time	Rank	Time	Rank
Gendis Syafitri	800 m	2:29.99	11	Did not advance	

== Badminton ==
Indonesia entered two athletes, one male and one female.

Athlete	Event	Play Stage				Quarter-finals	Semi-finals	Final	
Athlete	Event	Opposition Score	Opposition Score	Opposition Score	Rank	Opposition Score	Opposition Score	Opposition Score	Rank
Rayhan Pandu Aksara	Boys' singles	Hong (CHN); L 1–2 (19–21, 22–20, 16–21)	Klecivan (BRA); W 2–0 (21–17, 21–10)	Axel (DEN); W 2–0 (21–15, 21–10)	2	Did not advance			9
Miftaqul Putri Ayudis	Girls' singles	Elsa (MRI); W 2–0 (21–17, 21–14)	Yuzuno (JPN); L 0–2 (19–21, 14–21)	Nethmi (SRI); W 2–1 (21–18, 20–22, 21–15)	2	Did not advance			9

== Cycling ==
Indonesia entered two cyclist, one male and one female.

Athlete	Event	Final	
Athlete	Event	Time	Rank
M. Fathan Hidayatullah	Road race	1:48.03	13
M. Fathan Hidayatullah	Individual time trial	11:12.46	21
Aligya Keiko Hendranata	Road race	1:31.25	21
Aligya Keiko Hendranata	Individual time trial	12:56.85	20

== Equestrian ==
Indonesia entered one male athlete.

Athlete	Horse	Event	Qualification					Final				
Athlete	Horse	Event	Round A		Round B		Rank	Round A		Round B		Rank
Athlete	Horse	Event	Penalties	Time	Penalties	Time	Rank	Penalties	Time	Penalties	Time	Rank
Nusrtdinov Zayan Fatih	Ucaral De Beaujour	Individual jumping	8	87.12	4	76.70	11 Q	—N/a	—N/a	8	80.57	17

== Judo ==
Indonesia entered one female judoka based on the available quotas assigned by the International Judo Federation.

Athlete	Event	Round of 16	Quarterfinals	Semifinals	Repechage		Final / BM	Rank
Athlete	Event	Round of 16	Quarterfinals	Semifinals	Round of 8	Round of 4	Final / BM	Rank
Athlete	Event	Opposition Result	Opposition Result	Opposition Result	Opposition Result	Opposition Result	Opposition Result	Rank
Sashenka Fatimah	Women –63 kg	Kwak Yuju (KOR); L 0–100	Did not advance		Chayeb (LBN); W 100–0	Kwak Yuju (KOR); W 2–0	Berrahoual (ALG); W 10–1	3rd place, bronze medalist(s)

== Swimming ==
Indonesia entered two swimmers, one male and one female.

Event	Athlete	Heats		Final	
Event	Athlete	Time	Rank	Time	Rank
Michelle Surjadi Fang	50 m butterfly	28.37	10 R	Did not advance	
Michelle Surjadi Fang	100 m butterfly	1:01.50	3 Q	1:01.33	5
Michelle Surjadi Fang	200 m butterfly	—N/a		2:14.10	3rd place, bronze medalist(s)
Reynald Delian Purwanto	100 m butterfly	58.24	16	Did not advance	
Reynald Delian Purwanto	200 m freestyle	2:02.25	32	Did not advance	
Reynald Delian Purwanto	200 m individual medley	2:17.65	9 R	Did not advance	

== Skateboarding ==
Indonesia entered one male athlete.

Athlete	Event	Preliminary		Final	
Athlete	Event	Result	Rank	Result	Rank
Zaidhar Ibrahim	Men's street	121.75	7	Did not advance	

== Triathlon ==
Indonesia entered one female athlete.

Athlete	Event	Time						Rank
Athlete	Event	Swim (750m)	Trans 1	Bike (20km)	Trans 2	Run (5km)	Total	Rank
Aira Martha Ardistri	Women's individual	10.14	0:25	43.53	3.06	1:01.23	1:05.53	20

== Wushu ==
Indonesia entered one male athlete after quotas were assigned by the International Wushu Federation.

Athlete	Event	Preliminary				Final			
Athlete	Event	Changquan	Gunshu	Total	Rank	Changquan	Gunshu	Total	Rank
Asael Rondonuwu	Men's changquan combined	9.300	9.313	18.613	2 Q	9.353	9.356	18.709	2nd place, silver medalist(s)
