= Iraq at the 2026 Summer Youth Olympics =

- Flag of Iraq
- IOC code: IRQ
- NOC: National Olympic Committee of Iraq
- Website: www.nociraq.iq

in Dakar, Senegal October 31, 2026 – November 13, 2026
- Competitors: 5 in 4 sports
- Flag bearers: Fatimah Al-azzawi & Hayder Al-asadi
- Medals: Gold 0 Silver 0 Bronze 0 Total 0

Summer Youth Olympics appearances (overview)
- 2010; 2014; 2018; 2026

Iraq is scheduled to compete at the 2026 Summer Youth Olympics in Dakar, Senegal from October 31 to November 13, 2026. This will mark Iraq's fourth appearance at the Youth Olympics, after making its debut in 2010.

Athlete Fatimah Al-azzawi and fencer Hayder Al-asadi served as the flag bearers for the opening ceremony.

== Competitors ==
The following is the list of number of competitors participating at the Games per sport/discipline.

Sport	Men	Women	Total
Athletics	1	1	2
Boxing	1	0	1
Coastal rowing	1	0	1
Fencing	1	0	1
Total	4	1	5

== Athletics ==
Iraq entered two athletes, one male and one female.

=== Track & road events ===
Men

Athlete	Event	Heat		Semifinal		Final	
Athlete	Event	Result	Rank	Result	Rank	Result	Rank
Hussein Alnasser	110 m hurdles						

Women

Athlete	Event	Heat		Semifinal		Final	
Athlete	Event	Result	Rank	Result	Rank	Result	Rank
Fatimah Al-azzawi	100 m hurdles						

== Boxing ==
Iraq entered one male athlete in the −50 kg category.

Men

Athlete	Weight	Round of 16	Quarterfinals	Semifinals	Final / BM	
Athlete	Weight	Opposition Result	Opposition Result	Opposition Result	Opposition Result	Rank
Almohaimen Takleef	–50 kg					

== Coastal rowing ==
Iraq entered one male rower.

Men

Athlete	Event	Round of 16	Quarterfinals	Semifinals	Final / BM	
Athlete	Event	Opposition Result	Opposition Result	Opposition Result	Opposition Result	Rank
Ahmed Al-azzawi	Solo					

== Fencing ==
Iraq entered one male athlete.

Athlete	Event	Round of 64	Round of 32	Round of 16	Quarterfinal	Semifinal	Final / BM	
Athlete	Event	Opposition Score	Opposition Score	Opposition Score	Opposition Score	Opposition Score	Opposition Score	Rank
Hayder Al-asadi	Men's sabre							
