= Suriname at the 2026 Summer Youth Olympics =

- Flag of Suriname
- IOC code: SUR
- NOC: Suriname Olympic Committee
- Website: www.surolympic.org

in Dakar, Senegal October 31, 2026 – November 13, 2026
- Competitors: 3 in 2 sports
- Flag bearers: Elya Powdar & Sean-Verno Dipokromo
- Medals: Gold 0 Silver 0 Bronze 0 Total 0

Summer Youth Olympics appearances
- 2010; 2014; 2018; 2026

Suriname is scheduled to compete at the 2026 Summer Youth Olympics in Dakar, Senegal from October 31 to November 13, 2026. This will mark Suriname's fourth appearance at the Youth Olympics, after making its debut in 2010.

Swimmers Elya Powdar and Sean-Verno Dipokromo served as the flag bearers for the opening ceremony.

== Competitors ==
The following is the list of number of competitors participating at the Games per sport/discipline.

Sport	Men	Women	Total
Athletics	1	0	1
Swimming	1	1	2
Total	2	1	3

== Athletics ==
Suriname entered one male athlete.

=== Field events ===
Men

Athlete	Event	Qualification		Final	
Athlete	Event	Distance	Position	Distance	Position
Leyon Cyrus	Long jump				

== Swimming ==
Suriname entered two swimmers, one male and one female.

Athlete	Event	Heat		Semifinal		Final	
Athlete	Event	Time	Rank	Time	Rank	Time	Rank
Sean-Verno Dipokromo	50 m freestyle						
Sean-Verno Dipokromo	100 m freestyle						
Sean-Verno Dipokromo	50 m butterfly						
Sean-Verno Dipokromo	100 m butterfly						
Elya Powdar	100 m freestyle						
Elya Powdar	200 m freestyle						
Elya Powdar	400 m freestyle						
