= Benin at the 2026 Summer Youth Olympics =

- Flag of Benin
- IOC code: BEN
- NOC: Benin National Olympic and Sports Committee
- Website: www.cnosben.org

in Dakar, Senegal October 31, 2026 – November 13, 2026
- Competitors: 7 in 5 sports
- Flag bearers: Etoile Agbodjogbe & Ganiou Abdourahaman
- Medals: Gold 0 Silver 0 Bronze 0 Total 0

Summer Youth Olympics appearances
- 2010; 2014; 2018; 2026

Benin is scheduled to compete at the 2026 Summer Youth Olympics in Dakar, Senegal from October 31 to November 13, 2026. This will mark Benin's fourth appearance at the Youth Olympics, after making its debut in 2010.

Swimmer Etoile Agbodjogbe and table tennis player Ganiou Abdourahaman served as the flag bearers for the opening ceremony.

== Competitors ==
The following is the list of number of competitors participating at the Games per sport/discipline.

Sport	Men	Women	Total
Athletics	1	0	1
Fencing	0	1	1
Swimming	1	2	3
Table tennis	1	0	1
Wushu	0	1	1
Total	3	4	7

== Athletics ==
Benin entered one male athlete.

Track events

Athlete	Event	Semifinal		Final	
Athlete	Event	Result	Rank	Result	Rank
Ibrahim Kissagui Guera	Men's 400 m				

== Fencing ==
Benin entered one female athlete.

Athlete	Event	Pool Round	Seed	Round of 16	Quarterfinals	Semifinals	Final / BM	Rank
Athlete	Event	Opposition Score	Seed	Opposition Score	Opposition Score	Opposition Score	Opposition Score	Rank
Olahitan Fassassi	Women's épée							

== Swimming ==
Benin entered three swimmers, one male and two female.

Athlete	Event	Heat		Final	
Athlete	Event	Time	Rank	Time	Rank
Shalom Tevoedjre	Men's 50 m freestyle	25.15	28	Did not advance	
Shalom Tevoedjre	Men's 100 m freestyle	59.89	64	Did not advance	
Etoile Agbodjogbe	Women's 50 m freestyle	36.12	65	Did not advance	
Etoile Agbodjogbe	Women's 100 m breaststroke	1:37.90	25	Did not advance	
Tina Apithy	Women's 100 m freestyle	1:25.97	64	Did not advance	
Tina Apithy	Women's 50 m breaststroke	48.88	34	Did not advance	

== Table tennis ==
Benin entered one male athlete.

Athlete	Event	Group stage				Round of 16	Quarterfinal	Semifinal	Final	
Athlete	Event	Opposition Result	Opposition Result	Opposition Result	Rank	Opposition Result	Opposition Result	Opposition Result	Opposition Result	Rank
Ganjou Abdourahaman	Men's singles	Okano (BRA); L 0–3	Asmu (ARG); L 0–3	Kawakami (JPN); L 0–3	4	Did not advance				

== Wushu ==
Benin entered one female athlete after quotas were assigned by the International Wushu Federation.

Athlete	Event	Preliminary						Final					
Athlete	Event	Event 1		Event 2		Total		Event 1		Event 2		Total	
Athlete	Event	Result	Rank	Result	Rank	Result	Rank	Result	Rank	Result	Rank	Result	Rank
Nelcy Noudofinin	Women's taijiquan combined	7.933	11	8.256	9	16.189	11	Did not advance					
