= Samoa at the 2026 Summer Youth Olympics =

- Flag of Samoa
- IOC code: SAM
- NOC: Samoa Association of Sports and National Olympic Committee

in Dakar, Senegal October 31, 2026 – November 13, 2026
- Competitors: 5 in 3 sports
- Flag bearers: Nafanua Hamilton & Crisroch Euta Levale
- Medals: Gold 0 Silver 0 Bronze 0 Total 0

Summer Youth Olympics appearances
- 2010; 2014; 2018; 2026

Samoa is scheduled to compete at the 2026 Summer Youth Olympics in Dakar, Senegal from October 31 to November 13, 2026. This will mark Samoa's fourth appearance at the Youth Olympics, after making its debut in 2010.

Swimmer Nafanua Hamilton and triathlete Crisroch Euta Levale served as the flag bearers for the opening ceremony.

== Competitors ==
The following is the list of number of competitors participating at the Games per sport/discipline.

Sport	Men	Women	Total
Athletics	1	1	2
Triathlon	1	0	1
Swimming	1	1	2
Total	3	2	5

== Athletics ==
Samoa entered one male and one female athlete.

Track events

Athlete	Event	Heat		Semifinal		Final	
Athlete	Event	Result	Rank	Result	Rank	Result	Rank
Vaetoeifaga Wongsin	Women's 400 metres hurdles						

Field events

Athlete	Event	Final	
Athlete	Event	Distance	Rank
Makisig Laban	Men's discus throw		

== Boxing ==
While Samoa was listed among the nations with a quota for the men's -70 kg event, they did not appear in the final athletes list.

== Rugby sevens ==
Samoa initially qualified a men's team. In September 2026 they were replaced by Uganda for unknown reasons.

== Swimming ==
Samoa entered two swimmers, one male and one female.

Athlete	Event	Heat		Final	
Athlete	Event	Time	Rank	Time	Rank
Luiz Moura	Men's 50 m freestyle				
Luiz Moura	Men's 50 m backstroke				
Luiz Moura	Men's 100 m backstroke				
Luiz Moura	Men's 200 m backstroke	2:11.45	7 Q	2:14.10	7
Nafanua Hamilton	Women's 50 m freestyle				
Nafanua Hamilton	Women's 100 m freestyle	59.31	14	Did not advance	Did not advance
Nafanua Hamilton	Women's 100 m backstroke				
Nafanua Hamilton	Women's 200 m individual medley				

== Triathlon ==
Samoa entered one male athlete.

Athlete	Event	Time						Rank
Athlete	Event	Swim (750m)	Trans 1	Bike (20km)	Trans 2	Run (5km)	Total	Rank
Crisroch Euta Levale	Men's	11:40	0:23	37:51	0:27	25:01	1:15:22	29
