= Dominica at the 2026 Summer Youth Olympics =

- IOC code: DMA
- NOC: Dominica Olympic Committee

in Dakar, Senegal 31 October – 13 November 2026
- Competitors: 2 in 2 sports
- Flag bearer: Seif Elshekh
- Medals: Gold 0 Silver 0 Bronze 0 Total 0

Summer Youth Olympics appearances
- 2010; 2014; 2018; 2026

Dominica is scheduled to compete at the 2026 Summer Youth Olympics in Dakar, Senegal from 31 October to 13 November 2026. This will mark Dominica's fourth appearance at the Youth Olympics, after making its debut in 2010.

The Dominican team consisted of two male athletes. Swimmer Seif Elshekh served as the flag bearer for the opening ceremony.

== Competitors ==
The following is the list of number of competitors participating at the Games per sport/discipline.

Sport	Men	Women	Total
Athletics	1	0	1
Swimming	1	0	1
Total	2	0	2

== Athletics ==
Domenica entered one male athlete.

=== Field events ===
Men

Athlete	Event	Stage 1		Stage 2		Total	
Athlete	Event	Result	Rank	Result	Rank	Total	Rank
Jaden Joseph	Long jump						

== Swimming ==
Domenica entered one male swimmer.

Men

Athlete	Event	Heat		Semifinal		Final	
Athlete	Event	Time	Rank	Time	Rank	Time	Rank
Seif Elshekh	100 m freestyle	56.98	53	N/A	N/A	Did not advance	Did not advance
Seif Elshekh	100 m butterfly	1:00.97	24	N/A	N/A	did not advance	did not advance

== See also ==
- Dominica at the 2026 Commonwealth Games
