= Athletics at the 2026 Summer Youth Olympics – Men's 400 metres =

Athletics event at the 2026 Summer Youth Olympics

Men's 400 metres at the IV Summer Youth Olympic Games
- Venue: Complexe Iba Mar Diop
- Date: 8 November
- Competitors: 16 from 16 nations

Medalists
1st place, gold medalist(s)		Saeed Omar	United Arab Emirates
2nd place, silver medalist(s)		Mustapha Jadama	The Gambia
3rd place, bronze medalist(s)		Han Liu	China

The men's 400 metres event at the 2026 Summer Youth Olympics was held on 8 November at the Complexe Iba Mar Diop in Dakar, Senegal. The competition consisted of two semi-final heats, with nine athletes qualifying for the final.

== Schedule ==
All times are local (West Africa Time, UTC+0).

Date	Time	Round
8 November 2026	16:52	Semi-finals
9 November 2026	17:00	Final

== Results ==
=== Semi-finals ===
The semi-finals consisted of two heats. The first four athletes in each heat (Q) qualified automatically for the final. One additional athlete with the fastest time among the remaining competitors (q) also advanced to the final. A total of nine athletes qualified for the final.

The abbreviation Q denotes qualification by finishing position, while q denotes qualification by time. Athletes who did not meet either qualification criterion were eliminated.

Rank	Semi-final	Bib	Athlete	Nation	Result	Notes
1	SF1	369	Mustapha Jadama	The Gambia	46.53	Q, PB
2	SF1	329	Han Liu	China	46.74	Q, PB
3	SF2	484	Saeed Omar	United Arab Emirates	48.33	Q
4	SF1	490	Richard Peña	Venezuela	48.36	Q
5	SF2	322	Vasil Antonov	Bulgaria	49.07	Q
6	SF1	407	Kadan Sam	Saint Lucia	49.14	Q, PB
7	SF2	468	Hady Abbas	Syria	49.92	Q, PB
8	SF1	313	Ibrahim Kissagui Guera	Benin	49.93	q, PB
9	SF2	316	Aobakwe Geza	Botswana	50.01	Q
10	SF1	420	Nick Bonett	Malta	50.06	
11	SF2	491	Tyrese Hackshaw	Saint Vincent and the Grenadines	50.44	PB
12	SF2	341	Andreas Panteli	Cyprus	51.88	
13	SF2	336	Chadrack Vungu Kayembe	Democratic Republic of the Congo	53.00	PB
14	SF2	432	Joel Mwaredaga	Nauru	53.67	PB
15	SF1	493	Nathan Matete	Zambia	54.40	PB
16	SF1	340	Leandro Duarte	Cape Verde	1:28.19	SB

=== Final ===
The final was held on 9 November 2026 at 17:00 local time. Saeed Omar of the United Arab Emirates won the gold medal in a personal best of 46.40 seconds.

Rank	Lane	Bib	Athlete	Nation	Result	Reaction time	Remark
1st place, gold medalist(s)	7	484	Saeed Omar	United Arab Emirates	46.40	0.158	PB
2nd place, silver medalist(s)	6	369	Mustapha Jadama	The Gambia	46.93	0.177	
3rd place, bronze medalist(s)	5	329	Han Liu	China	47.16	0.156	
4	4	322	Vasil Antonov	Bulgaria	47.90	0.144	
5	8	490	Richard Peña	Venezuela	48.78	0.182	
6	3	316	Aobakwe Geza	Botswana	49.41	0.166	
7	9	313	Ibrahim Kissagui Guera	Benin	49.57	0.218	PB
8	1	407	Kadan Sam	Saint Lucia	49.58	0.157	
9	2	468	Hady Abbas	Syria	50.32	0.159	
