= Lebanon at the 2026 Summer Youth Olympics =

- Flag of Lebanon
- IOC code: LBN
- NOC: Lebanese Olympic Committee
- Website: www.lebolymp.org

in Dakar, Senegal October 31, 2026 – November 13, 2026
- Competitors: 3 in 3 sports
- Flag bearer: Thea Obeid
- Medals: Gold 0 Silver 1 Bronze 0 Total 1

Summer Youth Olympics appearances
- 2010; 2014; 2018; 2026

Lebanon is scheduled to compete at the 2026 Summer Youth Olympics in Dakar, Senegal from October 31 to November 13, 2026. This will mark Lebanon's fourth appearance at the Youth Olympics, after making its debut in 2010.

Swimmer Thea Obeid served as the flag bearer for the opening ceremony.

== Competitors ==
The following is the list of number of competitors participating at the Games per sport/discipline.

Sport	Men	Women	Total
Boxing	1	0	1
Judo	0	1	1
Swimming	0	1	1
Total	1	2	3

== Boxing ==
Lebanon entered one male athlete in the −55 kg category.

Men

Athlete	Weight	Round of 16	Quarterfinals	Semifinals	Final / BM	
Athlete	Weight	Opposition Result	Opposition Result	Opposition Result	Opposition Result	Rank
Ramzi Hilal	–55 kg					

== Judo ==
Lebanon entered one female judoka based on the available quotas assigned by the International Judo Federation.

Women

Athlete	Event	Round of 16	Quarterfinals	Semifinals	Repechage	Final / BM	
Athlete	Event	Opposition Result	Opposition Result	Opposition Result	Opposition Result	Opposition Result	Rank
Teressa Chayeb	–63 kg						

== Swimming ==
Lebanon entered one female swimmer.

Athlete	Event	Heat		Semifinal		Final	
Athlete	Event	Time	Rank	Time	Rank	Time	Rank
Thea Obeid	50 m breaststroke						
Thea Obeid	100 m breaststroke						
