= Athletics at the 2026 Summer Youth Olympics – Men's high jump =

Athletics event at the 2026 Summer Youth Olympics

Men's high jump at the IV Summer Youth Olympic Games
- Venue: Complexe Iba Mar Diop
- Date: 9 November 2026
- Competitors: 9 from 9 nations
- Winning time: 2.16 m

Medalists
1st place, gold medalist(s)		Matao le Roux	South Africa
2nd place, silver medalist(s)		Sen Liu	China
3rd place, bronze medalist(s)		Mohamed Zaki Moh A	Egypt

The men's high jump event at the 2026 Summer Youth Olympics was held on 9 November at the Complexe Iba Mar Diop in Dakar, Senegal. The competition was contested as a single final, with South Africa's Matao le Roux winning the gold medal with a height of 2.16 metres, equalling his personal best.

== Schedule ==
The official athletics schedule listed the men's high jump final for 9 November 2026 at 16:02 local time (UTC).

Date	Time	Round
9 November 2026	16:02	Final

== Results ==
=== Final ===
The men's high jump was contested in a single final, in accordance with the official athletics competition format for field events.

The final was held on 9 November 2026, beginning at 16:04 and concluding at 17:42. Matao le Roux won the gold medal with 2.16 metres, equalling his personal best. Sen Liu finished second with 2.14 metres, while Mohamed Zaki Moh A took bronze with 2.09 metres.

Rank	Bib	Athlete	Nation	Result	Remark
1st place, gold medalist(s)	453	Matao le Roux	South Africa	2.16	=PB
2nd place, silver medalist(s)	330	Sen Liu	China	2.14	PB
3rd place, bronze medalist(s)	352	Mohamed Zaki Moh A	Egypt	2.09	PB
4	476	Kai-Lun Huang	Chinese Taipei	2.09	=PB
5	440	Dawid Baranski	Poland	2.06	
6	318	Naftaly Magalhães	Brazil	2.02	
6	409	Redas Siuipys	Lithuania	2.02	
8	429	Obanla Ehuwa	Nigeria	1.97	PB
	309	Ashley Demeritte	Bahamas	NM	
