= Maldives at the 2026 Summer Youth Olympics =

- Flag of Maldives
- IOC code: MDV
- NOC: Maldives Olympic Committee
- Website: www.olympic.mv

in Dakar, Senegal October 31, 2026 – November 13, 2026
- Competitors: 2 in 1 sport
- Flag bearers: Amna Thazkiyah Mirsaad & Looth Mohamed Hussain
- Medals: Gold 0 Silver 0 Bronze 0 Total 0

Summer Youth Olympics appearances
- 2010; 2014; 2018; 2026

Maldives is scheduled to compete at the 2026 Summer Youth Olympics in Dakar, Senegal from October 31 to November 13, 2026. This will mark Maldives's fourth appearance at the Youth Olympics, after making its debut in 2010.

Swimmers Amna Thazkiyah Mirsaad and Looth Mohamed Hussain served as the flag bearers for the opening ceremony.

== Competitors ==
The following is the list of number of competitors participating at the Games per sport/discipline.

Sport	Men	Women	Total
Swimming	1	1	2
Total	1	1	2

== Swimming ==
Maldives entered two swimmers, one male and one female.

Athlete	Event	Heat		Semifinal		Final	
Athlete	Event	Time	Rank	Time	Rank	Time	Rank
Looth Mohamed Hussain	50 m breaststroke						
Looth Mohamed Hussain	100 m breaststroke						
Looth Mohamed Hussain	200 m breaststroke						
Amna Thazkiyah Mirsaad	50 m freestyle						
Amna Thazkiyah Mirsaad	50 m backstroke						
Amna Thazkiyah Mirsaad	50 m butterfly	31.04	27	N/A	N/A	did not advance	did not advance
