= Comoros at the 2026 Summer Youth Olympics =

- Flag of Comoros
- IOC code: COM
- NOC: Comité Olympique et Sportif des Iles Comores

in Dakar, Senegal October 31, 2026 – November 13, 2026
- Competitors: 3 in 2 sports
- Flag bearers: Kamila Ibrahim & Ali Younes
- Medals: Gold 0 Silver 0 Bronze 0 Total 0

Summer Youth Olympics appearances
- 2010; 2014; 2018; 2026

Comoros is scheduled to compete at the 2026 Summer Youth Olympics in Dakar, Senegal from October 31 to November 13, 2026. This will mark Comoros's fourth appearance at the Youth Olympics, after making its debut in 2010.

Swimmers Kamila Ibrahim and Ali Younes served as the flag bearers for the opening ceremony.

== Competitors ==
The following is the list of number of competitors participating at the Games per sport/discipline.

| Sport | Men | Women | Total |
|---|---|---|---|
| Athletics | 1 | 0 | 1 |
| Swimming | 1 | 2 | 3 |
| Total | 2 | 1 | 3 |

== Athletics ==
Comoros entered one male athlete.

=== Track & road events ===
Men

| Athlete | Event | Heat | | Semifinal | | Final | |
| Athlete | Event | Result | Rank | Result | Rank | Result | Rank |
|---|---|---|---|---|---|---|---|
| Frederic Humblot | 200 m | | | | | | |

== Swimming ==
Comoros entered two swimmers, one of each gender.

| Athlete | Event | Heat | | Final | |
| Athlete | Event | Time | Rank | Time | Rank |
|---|---|---|---|---|---|
| Ali Younes | 100 m freestyle | 58.18 | 57 | Did not advance | |
| Ali Younes | 100 m butterfly | 1:06.84 | 28 | Did not advance | |
| Ali Younes | 200 m butterfly | | | Did not advance | |
| Kamila Ibrahim | 100 m freestyle | 1:09.22 | 61 | Did not advance | |
| Kamila Ibrahim | 200 m freestyle | | | Did not advance | |
| Kamila Ibrahim | 100 m backstroke | | | Did not advance | |
