= Haiti at the 2026 Summer Youth Olympics =

- Flag of Haiti
- IOC code: HAI
- NOC: Comité Olympique Haïtien

in Dakar, Senegal October 31, 2026 – November 13, 2026
- Competitors: 2 in 2 sports
- Flag bearer: Jude Christophe Jerome
- Medals: Gold 0 Silver 0 Bronze 0 Total 0

Summer Youth Olympics appearances
- 2010; 2014; 2018; 2026

Haiti is competed at the 2026 Summer Youth Olympics in Dakar, Senegal from October 31 to November 13, 2026. This marked Haiti's fourth appearance at the Youth Olympics, after making its debut in 2010.

Swimmer Jude Christophe Jerome served as the flag bearer for the opening ceremony.

== Competitors ==
The following is the list of number of competitors participating at the Games per sport/discipline.

Sport	Men	Women	Total
Athletics	0	1	1
Swimming	1	0	1
Total	1	1	2

== Athletics ==
Haiti entered one female athlete.

=== Track & road events ===
Women

Athlete	Event	Heat		Semifinal		Final	
Athlete	Event	Result	Rank	Result	Rank	Result	Rank
Hope Edwards	800 m						

== Swimming ==
Haiti entered one male swimmer.

Athlete	Event	Heat		Semifinal		Final	
Athlete	Event	Time	Rank	Time	Rank	Time	Rank
Jude Christophe Jerome	50 m freestyle						
Jude Christophe Jerome	200 m freestyle						
Jude Christophe Jerome	50 m butterfly						
Jude Christophe Jerome	50 m backstroke						
