= Mauritania at the 2026 Summer Youth Olympics =

- Flag of Mauritania
- IOC code: MTN
- NOC: Comité National Olympique et Sportif Mauritanien

in Dakar, Senegal October 31, 2026 – November 13, 2026
- Competitors: 3 in 2 sports
- Flag bearers: Coumba Diop & Mohamed Said
- Medals: Gold 0 Silver 0 Bronze 0 Total 0

Summer Youth Olympics appearances
- 2010; 2014; 2018; 2026

Mauritania is scheduled to compete at the 2026 Summer Youth Olympics in Dakar, Senegal from October 31 to November 13, 2026. This will mark Mauritania's fourth appearance at the Youth Olympics, after making its debut in 2010.

Judoka Coumba Diop and athlete Mohamed Said served as the flag bearers for the opening ceremony.

== Competitors ==
The following is the list of number of competitors participating at the Games per sport/discipline.

| Sport | Men | Women | Total |
|---|---|---|---|
| Athletics | 1 | 1 | 2 |
| Judo | 0 | 1 | 1 |
| Total | 1 | 2 | 3 |

== Athletics ==
Mauritania entered two athletes, one of each gender.

=== Track & road events ===
Men

| Athlete | Event | Semifinal | | Final | |
| Athlete | Event | Result | Rank | Result | Rank |
|---|---|---|---|---|---|
| Mohamed Said | 100 m | | | | |

Women

| Athlete | Event | Semifinal | | Final | |
| Athlete | Event | Result | Rank | Result | Rank |
|---|---|---|---|---|---|
| Faty Sy | 100 m | | | | |

== Judo ==
Mauritania entered one female judoka based on the available quotas assigned by the International Judo Federation.

Women

| Athlete | Event | Round of 16 | Quarterfinals | Semifinals | Repechage 1 | Repechage 2 | Final | |
| Athlete | Event | Opposition Result | Opposition Result | Opposition Result | Opposition Result | Opposition Result | Opposition Result | Rank |
|---|---|---|---|---|---|---|---|---|
| Coumba Diop | –44 kg | Bye | | | | | | |
