= Swimming at the 2026 Summer Youth Olympics – Men's 200 metre backstroke =

Men's 200 metre backstroke at the 2026 Summer Youth Olympics
- Venue: Complexe Tour de l'Oeuf
- Dates: 1 November
- Competitors: 10 from 10 nations
- Winning time: 1:59.15

Medalists
gold medal	Ariel Muchirahondo	New Zealand
silver medal	Parsa Shahshahani	Iran
bronze medal	Nikolaos Papatheodorou	Greece

The men's 200 metre backstroke event at the 2026 Summer Youth Olympics took place on 1 November 2026 at the Complexe Tour de l'Oeuf in Dakar, Senegal.

== Results ==
=== Heats ===
The eight fastest swimmers advanced to the final. Qualifiers are highlighted in green.

Rank	Heat	Name	Nationality	Time	Qualification
1	2	Ariel Muchirahondo	New Zealand	2:02.06	Q
2	2	Parsa Shahshahani	Iran	2:03.68	Q
3	1	Nikolaos Papatheodorou	Greece	2:04.97	Q
4	1	Jakov Wozdecky	Croatia	2:05.71	Q
5	2	Houd Abed	Algeria	2:06.71	Q
6	2	Kyrylo Malesyk	Ukraine	2:08.47	Q
7	1	Kobe Tuioti	Samoa	2:11.45	Q
8	2	Mohamed Yassine Ben Ajmia	Tunisia	2:16.61	Q
9	1	Danniel Chan	Brunei	2:17.11	
10	1	Hazen Dabriel	Saint Vincent and the Grenadines	2:21.88	

=== Final ===
Rank	Name	Nationality	Heats time	Final time
1st place, gold medalist(s)	Ariel Muchirahondo	New Zealand	2:02.06	1:59.15
2nd place, silver medalist(s)	Parsa Shahshahani	Iran	2:03.68	2:02.74
3rd place, bronze medalist(s)	Nikolaos Papatheodorou	Greece	2:04.97	2:03.23
4	Jakov Wozdecky	Croatia	2:05.71	2:03.51
5	Houd Abed	Algeria	2:06.71	2:07.51
6	Kyrylo Malesyk	Ukraine	2:08.47	2:08.65
7	Kobe Tuioti	Samoa	2:11.45	2:14.10
8	Mohamed Yassine Ben Ajmia	Tunisia	2:16.61	2:16.75
