= Judo at the 2026 Summer Youth Olympics – Women's 44 kg =

Judo Women's 44 kg at the 2026 Summer Youth Olympics
- Venue: Complexe Iba Mar Diop
- Location: Dakar, Senegal
- Date: 1 November
- Competitors: 11 from 11 nations

Medalists
gold medal	Sema Nur Yüksel	Turkey
silver medal	Houda Wshah	Jordan
bronze medal	Rosalvick Aguilar	Venezuela
bronze medal	Sara Coni	Italy

Competition at external databases
- Links: IJF • JudoInside

The women's 44 kg competition in judo at the 2026 Summer Youth Olympics in Dakar was held on 1 November 2026 at the Dakar Expo Centre.

== Results ==
=== Main bracket ===
Round of 16
Aliaksandra Kniazeva (BLR)	100
Theresa Tagarira (BOT)	000
Coumba Houssein Diop (MTN)	000
Sara Coni (ITA)	020
Houda Wshah (JOR)	100 (yellow card)
Io Papatheodorou (GRE)	000
Rosalvick Aguilar (VEN)	101
Nour Mohamed (DJI)	000

Quarter-finals
Sema Nur Yüksel (TUR)	100
Aliaksandra Kniazeva (BLR)	000
~~Carla Tolentino (DOM)~~
Sara Coni (ITA)	w/o
Julia Błaszczyk (POL)	000
Houda Wshah (JOR)	011
Aïcha Diop (SEN)	000 (yellow card)
Rosalvick Aguilar (VEN)	101

Semi-finals
Sema Nur Yüksel (TUR)	110
Sara Coni (ITA)	000
Houda Wshah (JOR)	001
Rosalvick Aguilar (VEN)	000

Final
Sema Nur Yüksel (TUR)	110
Houda Wshah (JOR)	000 (yellow card)

=== Repechage ===
Repechage 1
Theresa Tagarira (BOT)	w/o
~~Carla Tolentino (DOM)~~
Coumba Houssein Diop (MTN)	000
Aliaksandra Kniazeva (BLR)	100
Io Papatheodorou (GRE)	w/o
Aïcha Diop (SEN)
Nour Mohamed (DJI)	000
Julia Błaszczyk (POL)	100

Repechage 2
Theresa Tagarira (BOT)	100 (yellow card)
Aliaksandra Kniazeva (BLR)	010
Io Papatheodorou (GRE)	100
Julia Błaszczyk (POL)	000

Bronze medal
Theresa Tagarira (BOT)	000 (yellow card)
Rosalvick Aguilar (VEN)	101
Io Papatheodorou (GRE)	000 (yellow card)
Sara Coni (ITA)	100
