= Equestrian at the 2026 Summer Youth Olympics =

Equestrian at the IV Summer Youth Olympic Games
- Venue: Equestrian Centre
- Dates: 2–4 November
- No. of events: 1 (1 mixed)
- Competitors: 24 from 24 nations

Equestrian at the 2026 Summer Youth Olympics was held from 2 to 5 November. The event took place at the Equestrian Centre in Diamniadio, Senegal.

== Qualification ==
Each National Olympic Committee (NOC) could nominate a maximum of one participant. Senegal, as the host nation, received one guaranteed quota place. Athletes had to be born between November 14, 2008, and December 31, 2011 in order to be eligible to participate.

Furthermore, athletes must have accumulated fewer than 8 penalty points at one of the following competitions held between April 1, 2025, and May 15, 2026:

- 2025 Junior European Championships
- 2025 Junior North American Championships
- 2025 Junior South American Championships
- Grand Prix events of classes CSI1*, CSI2*, CSIJ, CSIY, or CSIU25

Four quota places are allocated per region, with one African quota place already allocated to the host nation. These regions were:

- Europe
- North and Central America including the Caribbean
- South America
- Africa
- Asia
- Oceania

=== Qualification summary ===
In May 2026, the Fédération Équestre Internationale (FEI) published the list of invited NOCs. Unlike the originally published qualification criteria, Oceania was not listed as a separate group. Instead, an intercontinental group was included.

Continent	NOK
Africa	Egypt
Africa	Morocco
Africa	Senegal
Africa	South Africa
Europe	Russia
Europe	Monaco
Europe	Sweden
Europe	Switzerland
North America	Costa Rica
North America	Guatemala
North America	Honduras
North America	United States
South America	Argentina
South America	Brazil
South America	Colombia
South America	Ecuador
Asia	China
Asia	India
Asia	Indonesia
Asia	United Arab Emirates
Intercontinental	Algeria
Intercontinental	Australia
Intercontinental	New Zealand
Intercontinental	Zimbabwe

== Medal summary ==
=== Medal table ===
* Host nation (Senegal)

Rank	NOC	Gold	Silver	Bronze	Total
Totals (0 entries)		0	0	0	0

=== Medalists ===
Event	Gold	Silver	Bronze
Individual jumping	Mike Smits; Switzerland	Liza Tittle; United States	Alejandro Gutiérrez; Colombia
