= Nikolaos Papatheodorou =

Greek swimmer (born 2009)

Personal information
- Native name: Νικόλας Παπαθεοδώρου
- Nationality: Greek
- Born: 22 April 2009 (age 17)

Sport
- Sport: Swimming
- Strokes: Backstroke
Medal record
Men's swimming
Representing Greece
Youth Olympic Games
Gold medal – first place	2026 Dakar	50 m backstroke
Silver medal – second place	2026 Dakar	100 m backstroke
Bronze medal – third place	2026 Dakar	200 m backstroke
European Junior Championships
Silver medal – second place	2025 Šamorín	4×100 m medley relay

Nikolaos Papatheodorou (Greek: Νικόλας Παπαθεοδώρου; born 22 April 2009) is a Greek swimmer who specializes in the backstroke.

== Career ==
In November 2026, Papatheodorou competed at the 2026 Summer Youth Olympics and won a gold medal in the 50 metre backstroke with a time of 25.69 seconds. This was Greece's first gold medal of the 2026 Summer Youth Olympics. He won a silver medal in the 100 metre backstroke with a time of 55.79 seconds. He also won a bronze medal in the 200 metre backstroke with a time of 2:03.23.
