= Pi Durden Wangkay =

Filipino sprinter (born 2009)

Personal information
- Born: Pi Durden Forward Genilza Wangkay; February 3, 2009 (age 17)
- Home town: Biñan, Laguna

Sport
- Country: Philippines
- Sport: Track and field
- Events: 100 meters; 200 meters
- Coached by: Jonah Genilza

Achievements and titles
- Personal best: 21.36 – 200m (2026)
Medal record
Men's sprinting
Representing Philippines
Summer Youth Olympics
Bronze medal – third place	2026 Dakar	200 m
Asian Youth Games
Gold medal – first place	2025 Bahrain	200 m

Pi Durden Forward Genilza Wangkay is a Filipino sprinter.

== Early life and education ==
Pi Durden Forward Wangkay was born on February 3, 2009. He came from an athletics family, with his mother Jonah Genilza being a former sprinter who competed in high school and the Palarong Pambansa. His two sisters were also athletes.

Wangkay first became active in sports when he was in his third grade. He tried football and swimming before committing to athletics.

Wangkay attends the De La Salle Santiago Zobel School where his mother also coaches.

== Career ==
Wangkay has been winning medals in the youth tournaments. At the Batang Pinoy in Palawan in December 2024 he won three gold medals.

=== 2025 ===
Representing the National Capital Region, Wangkay won the secondary boys' 100-meter and 200m titles at the 2025 Palarong Pambansa in Laoag, Ilocos.

Later on he represented the Philippines at the 2025 Asian Youth Games in Bahrain. While he did not medal in the 100m, he won a gold medal in the 200m.

Wangkay, sprinting for the Zobel Junior Archers, won his first two golds at the University Athletic Association of the Philippines (UAAP) high school athletics competition. He bested the 100m and 200m races for Season 88.

Wangkay capped his year, by taking part at the 2025 SEA Games in Thailand.

=== 2026 ===
Wangkay competed at the 2026 Summer Youth Olympics in Dakar, Senegal. In the 200-meters finals, Wangkay clocked 21.36 enough for a bronze medal. He attained a personal best and broke his own national age-group records in the under-18 and under-20.

== Personal life ==
Wangkay hails from the city of Biñan, Laguna. Wangkay's first three given names garnered interest. "Pi" came from the irregular number of π representing "infinite possibilities", "Durden" came from Tyler Durden, the protagonist of the 1999 film Fight Club, and "Forward" came from the aspiration to "keep moving forward". These names were given by his father.
