= Brunei at the 2026 Summer Youth Olympics =

- IOC code: BRU
- NOC: Brunei Darussalam National Olympic Council
- Website: bruneiolympic.org

in Dakar, Senegal 31 October – 13 November 2026
- Competitors: 3 in 3 sports
- Flag bearers: Lauren Emily Chua; Danniel Chan
- Medals: Gold 0 Silver 0 Bronze 0 Total 0

Summer Youth Olympics appearances
- 2010; 2014; 2018; 2026

Brunei (competing as Brunei Darussalam) is scheduled to compete at the 2026 Summer Youth Olympics in Dakar, Senegal from 31 October to 13 November 2026. This marked Brunei's fourth appearance at the Youth Olympics, after making its debut in 2010.

The country's delegation consists of a six member contingent, including three athletes competing in three different sports. Prince Sufri Bolkiah, President of the Brunei Darussalam National Olympic Council, officially handed over the national flag to Chef de Mission Siti Jariah Matjinen on 24 October 2026.

Wushu taolu athlete Lauren Emily Chua and swimmer Danniel Chan served as the flag bearers for the opening ceremony.

== Competitors ==
The following is the list of number of competitors participating at the Games.

Sport	Men	Women	Total
Athletics	1	0	1
Swimming	1	0	1
Wushu	0	1	1
Total	2	1	3

== Athletics ==
Brunei entered one athlete in track events.

=== Track and road events ===
Men
Athlete	Event	Heat		Semifinal		Final	
Athlete	Event	Result	Rank	Result	Rank	Result	Rank
Md Nazul Faeiz	200 m	N/A	–	22.27	8 Q	22.30	8

== Swimming ==
Brunei entered one swimmer.

Athlete	Event	Heat		Final	
Athlete	Event	Time	Rank	Time	Rank
Danniel Chan	200 m backstroke	2:17.11	9	Did not advance	

== Wushu ==
Brunei entered one athlete in taolu competitions.

Athlete	Event	Taijishan routine		Taijiquan routine		Total points	Final rank
Athlete	Event	Points	Rank	Points	Rank	Total points	Final rank
Lauren Emily Chua	Women's taijiquan combined	8.980	7	9.013	5	17.993	7

== See also ==
- Brunei at the 2026 Commonwealth Games
