= South Africa at the 2026 Summer Youth Olympics =

- Flag of South Africa
- IOC code: RSA
- NOC: South African Sports Confederation and Olympic Committee
- Website: www.sascoc.co.za

in Dakar, Senegal October 31, 2026 – November 13, 2026
- Competitors: 46 in 15 sports
- Medals: Gold 3 Silver 5 Bronze 3 Total 11

Summer Youth Olympics appearances
- 2010; 2014; 2018; 2026

South Africa is scheduled to compete at the 2026 Summer Youth Olympics in Dakar, Senegal from October 31 to November 13, 2026. This will mark South Africa's fourth appearance at the Youth Olympics, after making its debut in 2010.

== Competitors ==
The following is the list of number of competitors participating at the Games per sport/discipline.

Sport	Men	Women	Total
Archery	1	1	2
Artistic gymnastics	3	3	6
Athletics	5	5	10
Badminton	1	0	1
Beach volleyball	2	0	2
Beach wrestling	0	1	1
Coastal rowing	1	0	1
Fencing	0	1	1
Equestrian	0	1	1
Judo	1	0	1
Road cycling	1	1	2
Rugby sevens	12	0	12
Skateboarding	1	0	1
Swimming	2	2	4
Triathlon	0	1	1
Total	30	16	46

== Medallists ==
The following South African competitors won medals at the games. In the by discipline sections below, medallists' names are bolded.

Medal	Name(s)	Sport	Event	Date	Reference
Gold	Callum Dreyer	Coastal rowing	Men's solo	3 November	
Gold	Matao le Roux	Athletics	Men's high jump	9 November	
Gold	Megan Nieman	Athletics	Women's 400 metre hurdles	10 Novenber	
Silver	Leah Markgraaff	Swimming	Women's 400 metre freestyle	1 November	
Silver	Werner de Bruin; Dandré Brink; Jake Dave; Darnell Delport; Corné Ferreira; Thubelihle Marule; Siphesihle Marule; Divan Meyer; Albert Nel; Kingsley Pule; James Sale; Rosco Williams	Rugby sevens	Men's Rugby sevens	2 November	
Silver	Chanel Veldsman	Swimming	Women's 100 metre breaststroke	3 November	
Silver	John-Pierre Theron	Athletics	Men's hammer throw	8 November	
Silver	Milan Blignaut	Athletics	Women's high jump	10 November	
Bronze	Chanel Veldsman	Swimming	Women's 200 metre breaststroke	2 November	
Bronze	Enrique Bosch	Athletics	Men's 110 metre hurdles	9 November	
Bronze	Darius Botha	Athletics	Men's shot put	9 November	

== Archery ==
South Africa entered two archers, one of each gender.

== Artistic gymnastics ==
South Africa entered six artistic gymnasts, three of each gender.

Boys
Team

Athlete	Event	Qualification								Final							
Athlete	Event	Apparatus						Total	Rank	Apparatus						Total	Rank
Athlete	Event	F	PH	R	V	PB	HB	Total	Rank	F	PH	R	V	PB	HB	Total	Rank
Frederik Davies-Vaneetvelde	Team															—N/a	
Gethin Davies-Vaneetvelde	Team															—N/a	
Pfumelo Shibambu	Team															—N/a	
Total	Team																

Individual all-around

Athlete	Event	Final							
Athlete	Event	Apparatus						Total	Rank
Athlete	Event	F	PH	R	V	PB	HB	Total	Rank
	All-around								

Girls
Team

Athlete	Event	Qualification						Final					
Athlete	Event	Apparatus				Total	Rank	Apparatus				Total	Rank
Athlete	Event	V	UB	BB	FX	Total	Rank	V	UB	BB	FX	Total	Rank
Zia Davids	Team											—N/a	
Lila du Plessis	Team											—N/a	
Haylee van Rensburg	Team											—N/a	
Total	Team												

Individual all-around

Athlete	Event	Final					
Athlete	Event	Apparatus				Total	Rank
Athlete	Event	V	UB	BB	FX	Total	Rank
	All-around						

== Athletics ==
Track and road events

Athlete	Event	Heat		Final	
Athlete	Event	Result	Rank	Result	Rank
Enrique Bosch	Men's 110 metre hurdles	13.45	Q	13.45	3rd place, bronze medalist(s)
Janelle Kirkpatrick	Women's 100 metres hurdles	14.39	Q	13.78	5
Megan Nieman	Women's 400 metre hurdles	1:00.56	Q	57.75	1st place, gold medalist(s)
Lara Stander	Women's 1500 metres	—N/a		4:31.50	4

Field events

Athlete	Event	Final	
Athlete	Event	Distance	Position
Matao le Roux	Men's high jump	2.16	1st place, gold medalist(s)
Darius Botha	Men's shot put	19.23	3rd place, bronze medalist(s)
Jacobus van der Merwe	Men's javelin throw	64.29	4
John-Pierre Theron	Men's hammer throw	71.79	2nd place, silver medalist(s)
Shiloh Snijders	Women's discus throw	41.58	4
Milan Blignaut	Women's high jump	1.74	2nd place, silver medalist(s)

== Beach wrestling ==
Wrestlers	Event	Group stage				Semi-final	Final / BM	
Wrestlers	Event	Opposition Score	Opposition Score	Opposition Score	Rank	Opposition Score	Opposition Score	Rank
Duné van Zyl	Women's 75 kg	Lahssini (MAR); W 3–0	Ebedo Diatta (SEN); L 1–5	Hruby (USA); L 0–5	3	Did not advance		

== Coastal rowing ==
South African entered one men rowers.

Athlete	Event	Qualification		Round of 16	Quarterfinal	Semifinal	Final	
Athlete	Event	Time	Rank	Opposition Time	Opposition Time	Opposition Time	Opposition Time	Rank
Callum Dreyer	Men's solo	2:42.14	4 Q	Domarkas (LTU); 2:19.71 Q	Zizka (CZE); 2:24.52 Q	Moor (HUN); 2:29.35 W	Molina (ESP); 2:15.65 W	1st place, gold medalist(s)

== Rugby sevens ==
- Men's tournament - 1 team of 12 athletes

Team	Event	Group stage				Semifinal	Final / BM	
Team	Event	Opposition Score	Opposition Score	Opposition Score	Rank	Opposition Score	Opposition Score	Rank
South African men's	Men	Senegal; W 43–5	Canada; W 24–17	Germany; W 34–7	1 Q	Argentina; W 24–12	France; L 19–26	2nd place, silver medalist(s)

Roster

- Werner de Bruin
- Dandré Brink
- Jake Dave
- Darnell Delport
- Corné Ferreira
- Thubelihle Marule
- Siphesihle Marule
- Divan Meyer
- Albert Nel
- Kingsley Pule
- James Sale
- Rosco Williams

== Triathlon ==
South Africa qualified one girl.

Athlete	Event	Time						Rank
Athlete	Event	Swim (750 m)	Trans 1	Bike (20 km)	Trans 2	Run (5 km)	Total	Rank
Taylor Foster	Women's	9:29	0:22	30:37	0:27	19:39	1:00:34	5

== See also ==
- South Africa at the 2026 Winter Olympics
- South Africa at the 2026 Commonwealth Games
