= Ariel Muchirahondo =

New Zealand swimmer (born 2009)

Personal information
- Born: 2 March 2009 (age 17)

Sport
- Sport: Swimming
- Strokes: Backstroke
Medal record
Men's swimming
Representing New Zealand
Youth Olympic Games
Gold medal – first place	2026 Dakar	100 m backstroke
Gold medal – first place	2026 Dakar	200 m backstroke
Silver medal – second place	2026 Dakar	200 m medley
Junior Pan Pacific Championships
Silver medal – second place	2026 Vancouver	100 m backstroke

Ariel Muchirahondo (born 2 March 2009) is a New Zealand swimmer.

== Career ==
In August 2026, Muchirahondo competed at the 2026 Junior Pan Pacific Swimming Championships and won a silver medal in the 100 metre backstroke with a New Zealand age record time of 54.63 seconds.

In November 2026, he represented New Zealand at the 2026 Summer Youth Olympics where he served as flag bearer during the opening ceremony. On the first day of competition he won a gold medal in the 200 metre backstroke with a time of 1:59.15. This was New Zealand's first ever gold medal in swimming at the Youth Olympic Games. He became the third New Zealand swimmer to medal at a Youth Olympic Games, and the first male, following Gabrielle Fa'amausili and Bobbi Gichard in 2014. He then won a gold medal in the 100 metre backstroke with a time of 55.69 seconds. He became the first New Zealand swimmer to win multiple medals at a Youth Olympic Games. He also won a silver medal in the 200 metre individual medley with a time of 2:01.66.
