= Zain Hesham =

Egyptian swimmer (born 2009)

Personal information
- Full name: Zain Hesham Ali
- Nickname: "The Nile crocodile"
- Nationality: Egypt
- Born: 20 May 2009 (age 17)

Sport
- Sport: Swimming
- Strokes: Butterfly
Medal record
Men's swimming
Representing Egypt
Youth Olympic Games
Gold medal – first place	2026 Dakar	50 m butterfly
Gold medal – first place	2026 Dakar	100 m butterfly
Gold medal – first place	2026 Dakar	200 m butterfly
African Junior Championships
Gold medal – first place	2025 Cairo	100 m butterfly
Gold medal – first place	2026 Oran	100 m butterfly
Gold medal – first place	2026 Oran	200 m butterfly
Gold medal – first place	2026 Oran	4×100 m freestyle
Gold medal – first place	2026 Oran	4×200 m freestyle
Silver medal – second place	2025 Cairo	200 m butterfly
Silver medal – second place	2025 Cairo	4×100 m mixed medley
Silver medal – second place	2026 Oran	50 m butterfly
Silver medal – second place	2026 Oran	50 m backstroke
Silver medal – second place	2026 Oran	4×100 m mixed medley

Zain Hesham (born 20 May 2009) is an Egyptian competitive swimmer. who represented his country at the Youth Olympic Games and African Swimming Championships.

== Career ==
In November 2026, Zain competed at the 2026 Summer Youth Olympics and won a gold medal in the 100 meters butterfly with a time of 52.16 seconds, This was Egypt's first gold medal of the 2026 Summer Youth Olympics. He also won a gold medal in the 50 Meters butterfly with a time of 24.06 seconds. then won a gold medal in the 200 Meters butterfly with a time of 1:57.88 seconds.
