= Coastal rowing at the 2026 Summer Youth Olympics =

Coastal rowing at the IV Summer Youth Olympic Games
- Venue: Saly Beach West
- Dates: 31 October–3 November
- No. of events: 3
- Competitors: 64 from 46 nations

Coastal rowing at the 2026 Summer Youth Olympics was held from 31 October to 3 November. The events took place at Saly Beach West.

== Qualification ==
=== Qualification summary ===
The following National Olympic Comitees received a quota place:

Continent	NOK	Men's single sculls	Women's single sculls	Mixed double sculls
Africa	Algeria	Yes	No	No
Africa	Egypt	Yes	Yes	Yes
Africa	Senegal	Yes	Yes	Yes
Africa	South Africa	Yes	No	No
Africa	Togo	Yes	No	No
Africa	Tunisia	Yes	Yes	Yes
Africa	Uganda	Yes	No	No
Africa	Zimbabwe	No	Yes	No
Europe	Austria	Yes	Yes	Yes
Europe	Cyprus	No	Yes	No
Europe	Czech Republic	Yes	Yes	Yes
Europe	Estonia	Yes	No	No
Europe	Finland	No	Yes	No
Europe	France	Yes	Yes	Yes
Europe	Germany	Yes	Yes	Yes
Europe	Great Britain	Yes	Yes	Yes
Europe	Greece	Yes	No	No
Europe	Hungary	Yes	No	No
Europe	Ireland	No	Yes	No
Europe	Italy	Yes	Yes	Yes
Europe	Latvia	No	Yes	No
Europe	Lithuania	Yes	No	No
Europe	Portugal	Yes	No	No
Europe	Romania	No	Yes	No
Europe	Spain	Yes	Yes	Yes
Europe	Switzerland	No	Yes	No
Europe	Turkey	Yes	Yes	Yes
Europe	Ukraine	Yes	Yes	Yes
Americas	Argentina	Yes	No	No
Americas	Brazil	Yes	No	No
Americas	El Salvador	No	Yes	No
Americas	Honduras	No	Yes	No
Americas	Mexico	Yes	Yes	Yes
Americas	Paraguay	No	Yes	No
Americas	Peru	Yes	No	No
Americas	United States	Yes	Yes	Yes
Asia	China	Yes	Yes	Yes
Asia	Hong Kong	Yes	Yes	Yes
Asia	Iraq	Yes	No	No
Asia	Japan	No	Yes	No
Asia	Kuwait	No	Yes	No
Asia	Saudi Arabia	Yes	No	No
Asia	Thailand	Yes	Yes	Yes
Oceania	American Samoa	No	Yes	No
Oceania	Australia	Yes	Yes	Yes
Oceania	Vanuatu	Yes	No	No

== Medal summary ==
=== Medal table ===
* Host nation (Senegal)

Rank	Nation	Gold	Silver	Bronze	Total
1	China	2	0	0	2
2	South Africa	1	0	0	1
3	Spain	0	1	1	2
4	Austria	0	1	0	1
4	Germany	0	1	0	1
6	France	0	0	1	1
6	Hungary	0	0	1	1
Totals (7 entries)		3	3	3	9

=== Events ===
Event	Gold	Silver	Bronze
Men's solo	Callum Dreyer; South Africa	Diego Molina; Spain	Ádám Moór; Hungary
Women's solo	Liu Lili; China	Carolina Guerra Gonzalez; Germany	Blanca López; Spain
Mixed double sculls	China; Su Juntao; Liu Lili	Austria; Lukas Schönhuber; Alena Lux	France; Raphaël de Boussac; Elisa Guilloton
