= Guatemala at the 2026 Summer Youth Olympics =

- Flag of Guatemala
- IOC code: GUA
- NOC: Guatemalan Olympic Committee
- Website: www.cog.org.gt

in Dakar, Senegal October 31, 2026 – November 13, 2026
- Competitors: 10 in 7 sports
- Flag bearers: Elissa Berganza & Santiago Noriega
- Medals: Gold 0 Silver 0 Bronze 0 Total 0

Summer Youth Olympics appearances
- 2010; 2014; 2018; 2026

Guatemala is scheduled to compete at the 2026 Summer Youth Olympics in Dakar, Senegal from October 31 to November 13, 2026. This will mark Guatemala's fourth appearance at the Youth Olympics, after making its debut in 2010.

Swimmers Elissa Berganza and Santiago Noriega served as the flag bearers for the opening ceremony.

== Competitors ==
The following is the list of number of competitors participating at the Games per sport/discipline.

Sport	Men	Women	Total
Artistic gymnastics	0	1	1
Athletics	1	1	2
Beach volleyball	2	0	2
Boxing	1	0	1
Equestrian	1	0	1
Swimming	1	1	2
Triathlon	0	1	1
Total	6	4	10

== Artistic gymnastics ==
Guatemala entered one female gymnast.

Girls

Athlete	Event	Qualification						Final					
Athlete	Event	Apparatus				Total	Rank	Apparatus				Total	Rank
Athlete	Event	V	UB	BB	F	Total	Rank	V	UB	BB	F	Total	Rank
Brithany Soberanis	All-around	11.733	10.666	10.966	11.333	44.698	32	did not qualify					

== Beach volleyball ==
Guatemala received a quota place for the men's tournament.

Summary

Team	Event	Group stage				Round of 16	Quarterfinals	Semifinals	Final / PG / BM	
Team	Event	Opposition Result	Opposition Result	Opposition Result	Rank	Opposition Result	Opposition Result	Opposition Result	Opposition Result	Rank
Joseph Godoy; Harold Vásquez	Men's tournament									

== Athletics ==
Guatemala entered two athletes, one male and one female.

=== Track & road events ===
Men

Athlete	Event	Heat		Semifinal		Final	
Athlete	Event	Result	Rank	Result	Rank	Result	Rank
Kevin Tobias	5000 m race walk						

Women

Athlete	Event	Heat		Semifinal		Final	
Athlete	Event	Result	Rank	Result	Rank	Result	Rank
Kristel Martínez	5000 m race walk						

== Boxing ==
Guatemala entered one male athlete in the -60 kg category.

Men

Athlete	Weight	Round of 16	Quarterfinals	Semifinals	Final / BM	
Athlete	Weight	Opposition Result	Opposition Result	Opposition Result	Opposition Result	Rank
Leonel Hernández	-60 kg					

== Equestrian ==
Guatemala received a quota place as one of the four invited NOCs from North America.

Athlete	Horse	Event	Qualification		Final			Jump-Off		
Athlete	Horse	Event	Penalties	Rank	Penalties	Time	Rank	Penalties	Time	Rank
Cristián Tejada		Individual jumping								

== Swimming ==
Guatemala entered two swimmers, one male and one female.

Men

Athlete	Event	Heat		Semifinal		Final	
Athlete	Event	Time	Rank	Time	Rank	Time	Rank
Santiago Noriega	400 m freestyle						

Women

Athlete	Event	Heat		Semifinal		Final	
Athlete	Event	Time	Rank	Time	Rank	Time	Rank
Elissa Berganza	100 m freestyle						

== Triathlon ==
Guatemala entered one female athlete.

Athlete	Event	Time						Rank
Athlete	Event	Swim (750m)	Trans 1	Bike (20km)	Trans 2	Run (5km)	Total	Rank
Angie López	Women's individual							
