= Djibouti at the 2026 Summer Youth Olympics =

- Flag of Djibouti
- IOC code: DJI
- NOC: Comité National Olympique Djiboutien

in Dakar, Senegal October 31, 2026 – November 13, 2026
- Competitors: 4 in 3 sports
- Flag bearers: Hibo Houssein & Chehem Yasso
- Medals: Gold 0 Silver 0 Bronze 0 Total 0

Summer Youth Olympics appearances
- 2010; 2014; 2018; 2026

Djibouti is scheduled to compete at the 2026 Summer Youth Olympics in Dakar, Senegal from October 31 to November 13, 2026. This will mark Djibouti's fourth appearance at the Youth Olympics, after making its debut in 2010.

Athlete Hibo Houssein and wushu taolu athlete Chehem Yasso served as the flag bearers for the opening ceremony.

== Competitors ==
The following is the list of number of competitors participating at the Games per sport/discipline.

Sport	Men	Women	Total
Athletics	1	1	1
Judo	0	1	1
Wushu	1	0	1
Total	2	2	4

== Athletics ==
Djibouti entered two athletes, one of each gender.

=== Track & road events ===
Men

Athlete	Event	Heat		Semifinal		Final	
Athlete	Event	Result	Rank	Result	Rank	Result	Rank
Kalid Miguil	3000 m						

Women

Athlete	Event	Heat		Semifinal		Final	
Athlete	Event	Result	Rank	Result	Rank	Result	Rank
Hibo Houssein	1500 m						

== Judo ==
Djibouti entered one female judoka based on the available quotas assigned by the International Judo Federation.

Women

Athlete	Event	Round of 16	Quarterfinals	Semifinals	Repechage 1	Repechage 2	Final	
Athlete	Event	Opposition Result	Opposition Result	Opposition Result	Opposition Result	Opposition Result	Opposition Result	Rank
Nour Mohamed	–44 kg							

== Wushu ==
Djibouti entered one male athlete after quotas were assigned by the International Wushu Federation.

Athlete	Event	Changquan routine		Gunshu routine		Total Points	Final Rank
Athlete	Event	Points	Rank	Points	Rank	Total Points	Final Rank
Chehem Yasso	Men's changquan combined						
