= Kuwait at the 2026 Summer Youth Olympics =

- Flag of Kuwait
- IOC code: KUW
- NOC: Kuwait Olympic Committee
- Website: www.kuwaitolympic.net

in Dakar, Senegal October 31, 2026 – November 13, 2026
- Competitors: 6 in 5 sports
- Flag bearers: Jenan Khaleefoh & Humoud Alhumoud
- Medals: Gold 0 Silver 0 Bronze 0 Total 0

Summer Youth Olympics appearances
- 2010; 2014; 2018; 2026

Kuwait is scheduled to compete at the 2026 Summer Youth Olympics in Dakar, Senegal from October 31 to November 13, 2026. This will mark Kuwait's fourth appearance at the Youth Olympics, after making its debut in 2010.

Rower Jenan Khaleefoh and swimmer Humoud Alhumoud served as the flag bearers for the opening ceremony.

== Competitors ==
The following is the list of number of competitors participating at the Games per sport/discipline.

Sport	Men	Women	Total
Athletics	0	1	1
Coastal rowing	0	1	1
Fencing	1	0	1
Judo	1	0	1
Swimming	1	1	2
Total	3	3	35

== Athletics ==
Kuwait entered one female athlete.

=== Field events ===
Women

Athlete	Event	Qualification		Final	
Athlete	Event	Distance	Position	Distance	Position
Yasmeen Roy	High Jump				

== Coastal rowing ==
Kuwait entered one female rower.

Women

Athlete	Event	Round of 16	Quarterfinals	Semifinals	Final / BM	
Athlete	Event	Opposition Result	Opposition Result	Opposition Result	Opposition Result	Rank
Jenan Khaleefoh	Solo					

== Fencing ==
Kuwait entered one male athlete.

Athlete	Event	Round of 64	Round of 32	Round of 16	Quarterfinal	Semifinal	Final / BM	
Athlete	Event	Opposition Score	Opposition Score	Opposition Score	Opposition Score	Opposition Score	Opposition Score	Rank
Abdulaziz Alduaij	Men's sabre							

== Judo ==
Kuwait entered one male judoka based on the available quotas assigned by the International Judo Federation.

Men

Athlete	Event	Round of 16	Quarterfinals	Semifinals	Repechage	Final / BM	
Athlete	Event	Opposition Result	Opposition Result	Opposition Result	Opposition Result	Opposition Result	Rank
Ali Aljadi	–81 kg						

== Swimming ==
Kuwait entered two swimmers, one male and one female.

Athlete	Event	Heat		Semifinal		Final	
Athlete	Event	Time	Rank	Time	Rank	Time	Rank
Hunoud Alhumoud	50 m freestyle						
Hunoud Alhumoud	100 m freestyle	53.19	18	Did not advance			
Hunoud Alhumoud	200 m freestyle						
Yasmine Alsanih	50 m freestyle						
Yasmine Alsanih	100 m freestyle	1:04.27	50	Did not advance			
