= Honduras at the 2026 Summer Youth Olympics =

- Flag of Honduras
- IOC code: HON
- NOC: Honduran Olympic Committee

in Dakar, Senegal October 31, 2026 – November 13, 2026
- Competitors: 10 in 8 sports
- Flag bearers: Olivia Cosenza & Renan Mena
- Medals: Gold 0 Silver 0 Bronze 0 Total 0

Summer Youth Olympics appearances
- 2010; 2014; 2018; 2026

Honduras is scheduled to compete at the 2026 Summer Youth Olympics in Dakar, Senegal from October 31 to November 13, 2026. This will mark Honduras's fourth appearance at the Youth Olympics, after making its debut in 2010.

Equestrian Olivia Cosenza and athlete Renan Mena served as the flag bearers for the opening ceremony.

== Competitors ==
The following is the list of number of competitors participating at the Games per sport/discipline.

Sport	Men	Women	Total
Athletics	1	0	1
Beach wrestling	0	1	1
Boxing	1	0	1
Coastal rowing	0	1	1
Equestrian	0	1	1
Fencing	0	1	1
Swimming	1	1	1
Taekwondo	1	1	2
Total	4	6	10

== Athletics ==
Honduras entered one male athlete.

=== Track & road events ===
Men

Athlete	Event	Heat		Semifinal		Final	
Athlete	Event	Result	Rank	Result	Rank	Result	Rank
Renan Mena	110 m hurdles						

== Beach wrestling ==
Honduras entered one female athlete.

Women

Athlete	Weight	Round of 16	Quarterfinals	Semifinals	Final / BM	
Athlete	Weight	Opposition Result	Opposition Result	Opposition Result	Opposition Result	Rank
Claudia Flores	-45 kg					

== Boxing ==
Honduras entered one male athlete in the -60 kg category.

Men

Athlete	Weight	Round of 16	Quarterfinals	Semifinals	Final / BM	
Athlete	Weight	Opposition Result	Opposition Result	Opposition Result	Opposition Result	Rank
Jafet Escalante	-60 kg					

== Coastal rowing ==
Honduras entered one female rower.

Women

Athlete	Event	Round of 16	Quarterfinals	Semifinals	Final / BM	
Athlete	Event	Opposition Result	Opposition Result	Opposition Result	Opposition Result	Rank
Elena Lara	Solo					

== Equestrian ==
Honduras received a quota place as one of the four invited NOCs from North America.

Athlete	Horse	Event	Qualification		Final			Jump-Off		
Athlete	Horse	Event	Penalties	Rank	Penalties	Time	Rank	Penalties	Time	Rank
Olivia Cosenza		Individual jumping								

== Fencing ==
Honduras entered one female athlete.

Athlete	Event	Round of 64	Round of 32	Round of 16	Quarterfinal	Semifinal	Final / BM	
Athlete	Event	Opposition Score	Opposition Score	Opposition Score	Opposition Score	Opposition Score	Opposition Score	Rank
Issabella García	Women's sabre							

== Swimming ==
Honduras entered two swimmers, one male and one female.

Athlete	Event	Heat		Semifinal		Final	
Athlete	Event	Time	Rank	Time	Rank	Time	Rank
Josué Matute	100 m freestyle						
Josué Matute	200 m freestyle						
Josué Matute	400 m freestyle						
Josué Matute	800 m freestyle						
Giulliana Ramírez	100 m freestyle						
Giulliana Ramírez	200 m freestyle						
Giulliana Ramírez	200 m individual medley						

== Taekwondo ==
Honduras entered two athletes, one male and one female.

Men

Athlete	Event	Round of 16	Quarterfinals	Semifinals	Repechage	Final / BM	
Athlete	Event	Opposition Result	Opposition Result	Opposition Result	Opposition Result	Opposition Result	Rank
Cedric Guzmán	-48 kg						

Women

Athlete	Event	Round of 16	Quarterfinals	Semifinals	Repechage	Final / BM	
Athlete	Event	Opposition Result	Opposition Result	Opposition Result	Opposition Result	Opposition Result	Rank
Ashley Castellanos	-63 kg						
