= Swimming at the 2026 Summer Youth Olympics – Men's 200 metre butterfly =

Men's 200 metre butterfly at the 2026 Summer Youth Olympics
- Venue: Complexe Tour de l'Oeuf
- Dates: 6 November
- Competitors: 11 from 11 nations
- Winning time: 1.57.88

Medalists
| gold medal | Zain Hesham | Egypt |
| silver medal | Dương Văn Hoàng Quy | Vietnam |
| bronze medal | Tirthank Pegu | India |

The men's 200 metre butterfly event at the 2026 Summer Youth Olympics took place on 6 November at the Complexe Tour de l'Oeuf in Dakar, Senegal.
