= Sweden at the 2026 Summer Youth Olympics =

- Flag of Sweden
- IOC code: SWE
- NOC: Swedish Olympic Committee
- Website: www.sok.se

in Dakar, Senegal October 31, 2026 – November 13, 2026
- Competitors: 6 in 5 sports
- Medals: Gold 0 Silver 0 Bronze 0 Total 0

Summer Youth Olympics appearances (overview)
- 2010; 2014; 2018; 2026

Sweden is scheduled to compete at the 2026 Summer Youth Olympics in Dakar, Senegal from October 31 to November 13, 2026. This will mark Sweden's fourth appearance at the Youth Olympics, after making its debut in 2010.

== Competitors ==
The following is the list of number of competitors participating at the Games per sport/discipline.

Sport	Men	Women	Total
Badminton	1	0	1
Beach volleyball	2	0	2
Boxing	1	0	1
Equestrian	0	1	1
Wushu	1	0	1
Total	5	1	6

== Badminton ==
Sweden received a quota place for the boys' tournament.

Athlete	Event
Felus Ding	Boys' tournament

== Beach volleyball ==
Sweden received a quota place for the boys' tournament.

Athletes	Event
Tjernqvist–Brus	Boys' tournament

== Boxing ==
Sweden received a quota place in the competition for boys below 55 kg.

Athlete	Event
Zaheer Changazi	below 55 kg

== Equestrian ==
Sweden received a quota place for the equestrian event.

Athlete	Event	Score	Rank
Valentina Jarl	Equestrian		

== Triathlon ==
Sweden originally received a quota place for the Boys' sprint, but later declined for unknown reasons.

== Wushu ==
Athlete	Event
Vincent Olsson	
