= Swimming at the 2026 Summer Youth Olympics – Men's 50 metre butterfly =

Men's 50 metre butterfly at the 2026 Summer Youth Olympics
- Venue: Complexe Tour de l'Oeuf
- Dates: 4 November
- Competitors: 44 from 44 nations
- Winning time: 24.06

Medalists
gold medal	Zain Hesham	Egypt
silver medal	Aleksej Kalanj	Serbia
bronze medal	Andrew Laghoutis	Cyprus

The men's 50 metre butterfly event at the 2026 Summer Youth Olympics took place on 4 November at the Complexe Tour de l'Oeuf in Dakar, Senegal.
