= Road cycling at the 2026 Summer Youth Olympics – Women's individual road race =

Women's individual road race at the IV Summer Youth Olympic Games
- Venue: Corniche Ouest (59.5 km)
- Date: 8 November
- Competitors: 41 from 40 nations
- Winning time: 1:31:19

Medalists
1st place, gold medalist(s)		Angelina Novolodskaya	Russia
2nd place, silver medalist(s)		Elsie Apps	Australia
3rd place, bronze medalist(s)		Linda Sítková	Czech Republic

The women's individual road race event at the 2026 Summer Youth Olympics took place on 8 November 2026 on a course that started and finished at Corniche Ouest in Dakar.

== Results ==
Rank	#	Cyclist	Nation	Time	Diff.
1st place, gold medalist(s)	36	Angelina Novolodskaya	Russia	1:31:19	
2nd place, silver medalist(s)	14	Elsie Apps	Australia	1:31:19	+0:00
3rd place, bronze medalist(s)	13	Linda Sítková	Czech Republic	1:31:19	+0:00
4	3	Julia Pośpiech	Poland	1:31:19	+0:00
5	5	Jana Gevers	Belgium	1:31:19	+0:00
6	26	Georgia Chourdaki	Greece	1:31:19	+0:00
7	29	Anel Tashbay	Kazakhstan	1:31:19	+0:00
8	17	Nabyenka García	Mexico	1:31:19	+0:00
9	34	Haru Quinto	Peru	1:31:19	+0:00
10	2	Anna Bonassi	Italy	1:31:19	+0:00
11	8	Noémie Martinet	France	1:31:19	+0:00
12	4	Madison Bateson	South Africa	1:31:19	+0:00
13	18	Karolína Hajduková	Slovakia	1:31:19	+0:00
14	30	June Nothum	Luxembourg	1:31:19	+0:00
15	24	Nahomi Játiva	Ecuador	1:31:19	+0:00
16	32	Karoline Flaterud	Norway	1:31:19	+0:00
17	40	Anastasiia Saturova	Ukraine	1:31:19	+0:00
18	39	Yang Chiao-hui	Chinese Taipei	1:31:19	+0:00
19	28	Ririne Tsunashima	Japan	1:31:19	+0:00
20	1	Lluna Jiménez	Spain	1:31:19	+0:00
21	27	Aligya Keiko Hendranata	Indonesia	1:31:25	+0:00
22	9	Donatha Akimana	Rwanda	1:33:06	+1:47
23	37	Rebeka Gonza	Slovenia	1:33:38	+2:19
24	6	Mahder Niguse	Ethiopia	1:35:41	+4:22
25	41	Gulhayo Sattorova	Uzbekistan	1:36:48	+5:29
26	42	Nguyễn Khang Hà My	Vietnam	1:37:55	+6:36
27	15	Salome Vargas	Colombia	1:37:55	+6:36
28	7	Hadjer Bousba	Algeria	1:37:55	+6:36
29	21	Ana Francisca Fierro	Chile	1:37:55	+6:36
30	20	Magdalena Kleinsasser	Austria	1:39:32	+8:13
31	35	Maritanya Krog	Philippines	1:42:06	+10:47
32	19	Julia Lambert	Argentina	1:42:06	+10:47
33	23	Francell Martínez	Costa Rica	1:42:42	+11:23
34	16	Ringnan Danjuma	Nigeria	1:44:20	+13:01
35	38	Sunisa Chumthong	Thailand	1:45:26	+14:07
	31	Gansükhiin Ariunkhüslen	Mongolia	Did not finish	
	11	Fata Faye	Senegal	Did not finish	
	33	María Paz Rosetti	Paraguay	Did not finish	
	10	Bianca Nell	Namibia	Did not finish	
	22	Charly Maliabo	Democratic Republic of the Congo	Did not finish	
	12	Rokhaya Gningue	Senegal	Did not finish	
	25	Elyana Kubrom	Eritrea	Did not start	
