= Road cycling at the 2026 Summer Youth Olympics – Women's road time trial =

Women's individual time trial at the IV Summer Youth Olympic Games
- Venue: Corniche Ouest (8.5 km)
- Date: 10 November
- Competitors: 41 from 40 nations
- Winning time: 11:32.57

Medalists
1st place, gold medalist(s)		Anel Tashbay	Kazakhstan
2nd place, silver medalist(s)		Karolína Hajduková	Slovakia
3rd place, bronze medalist(s)		Angelina Novolodskaya	Russia

The women's individual time trial event at the 2026 Summer Youth Olympics took place on 10 November 2026 on a course that started and finished at Corniche Ouest in Dakar.

== Results ==
Rank	#	Cyclist	Nation	Time	Diff.
1st place, gold medalist(s)	29	Anel Tashbay	Kazakhstan	11:32.57	
2nd place, silver medalist(s)	18	Karolína Hajduková	Slovakia	11:37.62	+5.05
3rd place, bronze medalist(s)	36	Angelina Novolodskaya	Russia	11:43.65	+11.08
4	32	Karoline Flaterud	Norway	11:49.41	+16.84
5	13	Linda Sítková	Czech Republic	11:58.06	+25.49
6	3	Julia Pośpiech	Poland	12:00.43	+27.86
7	17	Nabyenka García	Mexico	12:07.13	+34.56
8	30	June Nothum	Luxembourg	12:09.65	+37.08
9	8	Noémie Martinet	France	12:10.63	+38.06
10	1	Lluna Jiménez	Spain	12:23.39	+50.82
11	39	Yang Chiao-hui	Chinese Taipei	12:28.36	+55.79
12	14	Elsie Apps	Australia	12:29.05	+56.48
13	20	Magdalena Kleinsasser	Austria	12:30.45	+57.88
14	5	Jana Gevers	Belgium	12:37.20	+1:04.63
15	6	Mahder Niguse	Ethiopia	12:45.00	+1:12.43
16	37	Rebeka Gonza	Slovenia	12:47.98	+1:15.41
17	9	Donatha Akimana	Rwanda	12:51.83	+1:19.26
18	26	Georgia Chourdaki	Greece	12:51.84	+1:19.27
19	40	Anastasiia Saturova	Ukraine	12:52.23	+1:19.66
20	27	Aligya Keiko Hendranata	Indonesia	12:56.85	+1:24.28
21	34	Haru Quinto	Peru	12:57.00	+1:24.43
22	42	Nguyễn Khang Hà My	Vietnam	12:57.23	+1:24.66
23	2	Anna Bonassi	Italy	13:01.11	+1:28.54
24	15	Salome Vargas	Colombia	13:02.37	+1:29.80
25	7	Hadjer Bousba	Algeria	13:14.62	+1:42.05
26	21	Ana Francisca Fierro	Chile	13:16.77	+1:44.20
27	24	Nahomi Játiva	Ecuador	13:19.53	+1:46.96
28	28	Ririne Tsunashima	Japan	13:22.94	+1:50.37
29	23	Francell Martínez	Costa Rica	13:24.88	+1:52.31
30	35	Maritanya Krog	Philippines	13:33.94	+2:01.37
31	19	Julia Lambert	Argentina	13:35.96	+2:03.39
32	41	Gulhayo Sattorova	Uzbekistan	13:43.44	+2:10.87
33	4	Madison Bateson	South Africa	13:45.16	+2:12.59
34	16	Ringnan Danjuma	Nigeria	13:56.54	+2:23.97
35	38	Sunisa Chumthong	Thailand	14:04.50	+2:31.93
36	31	Gansükhiin Ariunkhüslen	Mongolia	14:33.40	+3:00.83
37	33	María Paz Rosetti	Paraguay	14:41.38	+3:08.81
38	10	Bianca Nell	Namibia	14:49.63	+3:17.06
39	11	Fata Faye	Senegal	14:52.08	+3:19.51
40	12	Rokhaya Gningue	Senegal	17:08.30	+5:35.73
41	22	Charly Maliabo	Democratic Republic of the Congo	17:13.65	+5:41.08
