= Athletics at the 2026 Summer Youth Olympics – Men's 800 metres =

Athletics event at the 2026 Summer Youth Olympics

Men's 800 metres at the IV Summer Youth Olympic Games
- Venue: Complexe Iba Mar Diop
- Date: 9–10 November 2026
- Competitors: 17 from 17 nations
- Winning time: 1:48.99

Medalists
1st place, gold medalist(s)		Yomif Abebe	Ethiopia
2nd place, silver medalist(s)		Ghebreab Mantay	Eritrea
3rd place, bronze medalist(s)		Timothy Cheptoek	Uganda

The men's 800 metres event at the 2026 Summer Youth Olympics was held on 9 and 10 November at the Complexe Iba Mar Diop in Dakar, Senegal. The competition consisted of semi-finals and a final.

== Schedule ==
The competition schedule listed the semi-finals for 9 November and the final for 10 November 2026.

Date	Time	Round
9 November 2026	16:10	Semi-finals
10 November 2026	14:20	Final

== Results ==
=== Semi-finals ===
The semi-finals were held on 9 November 2026. The first four athletes in each semi-final (Q), along with the next fastest athlete (q), were scheduled to advance to the final.

Rank	Bib	Athlete	Nation	Semi-final	Position	Result	Notes
1	356	Ghebreab Mantay	Eritrea	SF1	1	1:51.03	Q, PB
2	399	David Sekento	Kenya	SF2	1	1:54.02	Q
3	363	Yomif Abebe	Ethiopia	SF2	2	1:54.36	Q, PB
4	485	Timothy Cheptoek	Uganda	SF2	3	1:55.21	Q, PB
5	478	Wassim Outherni	Tunisia	SF2	4	1:55.82	Q
6	419	Matthew Azzopardi	Malta	SF2	5	1:58.09	q
7	469	Amasi Emmanuel	Tanzania	SF2	6	1:59.60	PB
8	342	Magnus Kofoed	Denmark	SF1	2	2:00.12	Q
9	347	Michael Azogue	Ecuador	SF1	3	2:02.01	Q
10	460	Gabriel Ini	Solomon Islands	SF1	4	2:03.10	Q, PB
11	384	Juvante Hurst	Virgin Islands	SF2	8	2:10.20	PB
12	473	Castro Amaral	Timor-Leste	SF1	5	2:15.65	PB
13	335	Emeraude Godlove Tchouta Fonkeu	Cameroon	SF2	9	2:22.31	PB
14	354	Clement Niyomuhhoza	Refugee Olympic Team	SF1	6	2:25.00	PB
	461	Abdikhaliq Idiris Ahmed	Somalia	SF1		DQ	TR17.5.1
	326	Banssoubo Kebzabo	Chad	SF2		DQ	TR17.2.3
	385	Flavio Angelini	Italy	SF1		DNS	

=== Final ===
The final was held on 10 November 2026.

Rank	Bib	Athlete	Nation	Result	Remark
1st place, gold medalist(s)	363	Yomif Abebe	Ethiopia	1:48.99	PB
2nd place, silver medalist(s)	356	Ghebreab Mantay	Eritrea	1:49.31	PB
3rd place, bronze medalist(s)	485	Timothy Cheptoek	Uganda	1:51.59	PB
4	342	Magnus Kofoed	Denmark	1:52.12	
5	399	David Sekento	Kenya	1:53.61	
6	478	Wassim Outherni	Tunisia	1:54.77	PB
7	419	Matthew Azzopardi	Malta	1:58.52	
8	347	Michael Azogue	Ecuador	1:58.55	
9	460	Gabriel Ini	Solomon Islands	2:01.02	PB
