= Slovakia at the 2026 Summer Youth Olympics =

- Flag of Slovakia
- IOC code: SVK
- NOC: Slovak Olympic Committee
- Website: www.olympic.sk

in Dakar, Senegal October 31, 2026 – November 13, 2026
- Competitors: 13 in 8 sports
- Flag bearers: Matiáš Krištof; Vivien Vadovičová
- Medals Ranked 43rd: Gold 1 Silver 2 Bronze 3 Total 6

Summer Youth Olympics appearances (overview)
- 2010; 2014; 2018; 2026

Slovakia is scheduled to compete at the 2026 Summer Youth Olympics in Dakar, Senegal from October 31 to November 13, 2026. This will mark Slovakia's fourth appearance at the Youth Olympics, after making its debut in 2010.

== Medalists ==
Medal	Name	Sport	Event	Date
Gold	Timotej Michalík	Cycling	Men's individual time trial	10 Nov
Silver	Karolína Hajduková	Cycling	Women's individual time trial	10 Nov
Silver	Karolína Kollárová	Boxing	Women's 60 kg	12 Nov
Bronze	Matiáš Krištof	Swimming	Men's 100 metre butterfly	1 Nov
Bronze	Vivien Vadovičová	Judo	Women's 52 kg	2 Nov
Bronze	Stela Megelová	Swimming	Women's 200 metre individual medley	4 Nov

== Competitors ==
The following is the list of number of competitors participating at the Games per sport/discipline.

Sport	Men	Women	Total
Archery	1	1	2
Athletics	1	1	2
Boxing	1	1	2
Cycling	1	1	2
Judo	0	1	1
Sailing	1	0	1
Swimming	1	1	2
Triathlon	0	1	1
Total	6	7	13

== Archery ==
Slovakia entered two archers, one of each gender.

Athlete	Event	Ranking round		Round of 32	Round of 16	Quarterfinals	Semifinals	Final / BM	
Athlete	Event	Score	Seed	Opposition Score	Opposition Score	Opposition Score	Opposition Score	Opposition Score	Rank
Oliver Soták	Men's individual	653	18	Akunevich (BLR); L 3–7	Did not advance				
Adela Tollarovičová	Women's individual	645	13	Viljoen (RSA); W 6–5	Pérez (ESP); L 1–7	Did not advance			
Oliver Soták; Adela Tollarovičová	Mixed team	1298	13 Q	United States (USA); L 3–5	Did not advance				

== Athletics ==
=== Track and road events ===
Athlete	Event	Semifinal		Final	
Athlete	Event	Result	Rank	Total	Rank
Timotej Vozár	Men's 110m hurdles	14.06	9 q	14.12	9
Nina Okuliarová	Women's 2000m steeplechase	—N/a		6:58.22	6

== Boxing ==
Athlete	Event	Preliminary	Quarterfinals	Semifinals	Final	
Athlete	Event	Opposition Result	Opposition Result	Opposition Result	Opposition Result	Rank
Kristian Harasník	Men's 60kg	bye	Arli (TUR); L 1–4	Did not advance		
Karolína Kollárová	Women's 60kg	Faye (SEN); W RSC	Kovera (UKR); W RSC	Mochii (JPN); W 4–1	Isoeva (UZB); L 1–4	2nd place, silver medalist(s)

== Cycling ==
=== Road ===
Athlete	Event	Time	Rank
Timotej Michalík	Men's road race	1:47:04	4
Timotej Michalík	Men's individual time trial	10:10.20	1st place, gold medalist(s)
Karolína Hajduková	Women's road race	1:31:19	13
Karolína Hajduková	Women's individual time trial	11:37.62	2nd place, silver medalist(s)

== Judo ==
Athlete	Event	Round of 16	Quarterfinals	Semifinals	Repechage	Final / BM	
Athlete	Event	Opposition Result	Opposition Result	Opposition Result	Opposition Result	Opposition Result	Rank
Vivien Vadovičová	Women's -52 kg	bye	Escobar Mutis (PAN); W 110–000	Supygaliyeva (KAZ); L 000–100	bye	Grigoryan (BEL); W 011–000	3rd place, bronze medalist(s)

== Sailing ==
Athlete	Event	Race													Net points	Final rank
Athlete	Event	1	2	3	4	5	6	7	8	9	10	11	12	M*	Net points	Final rank
Oliver Nadinec	Men's Windsurfing	23	23	22	DNS	21	20	17	21	21	17	23	24	302	230	23

== Swimming ==
Athlete	Event	Heat		Final	
Athlete	Event	Time	Rank	Time	Rank
Matiáš Krištof	Men's 100m freestyle	51.86	5	did not advance	
Matiáš Krištof	Men's 200m freestyle	1:54.85	3	did not advance	
Matiáš Krištof	Men's 100m butterfly	54.68	2 Q	54.71	3rd place, bronze medalist(s)
Stela Megelová	Women's 200m freestyle	2:07.15	3 Q	2:06.21	6
Stela Megelová	Women's 100m butterfly	1:02.57	2 Q	1:02.57	7
Stela Megelová	Women's 200m individual medley	2:19.81	2 Q	2:16.38	3rd place, bronze medalist(s)

== Triathlon ==
Athlete	Event	Swim (750 m)	Trans 1	Bike (20 km)	Trans 2	Run (5 km)	Total Time	Rank
Júlia Ivanová	Women's individual	9:47	0:25	30:18	0:24	21:11	1:02:05	10
