= Swimming at the 2026 Summer Youth Olympics – Men's 400 metre freestyle =

Men's 400 metre freestyle at the 2026 Summer Youth Olympics
- Venue: Complexe Tour de l'Oeuf
- Dates: 3 November
- Competitors: 33 from 33 nations
- Winning time: 3:47.86

Medalists
gold medal	Rami Al-Rahmouni	Saudi Arabia
silver medal	Bogdan Toropkin	Russia
bronze medal	Daniel Saborío	Mexico

The men's 400 metre freestyle event at the 2026 Summer Youth Olympics took place on 3 November at the Complexe Tour de l'Oeuf in Dakar, Senegal.

== Results ==
The heats were started at 10:00.

Rank	Heat	Lane	Name	Nationality	Time	Notes
1st place, gold medalist(s)	5	4	Rami Al-Rahmouni	Saudi Arabia	3:47.86	
2nd place, silver medalist(s)	4	1	Bogdan Toropkin	Russia	3:50.46	
3rd place, bronze medalist(s)	5	3	Daniel Saborío	Mexico	3:52.72	
4	5	5	Luca Marinescu	Romania	3:56.82	
5	5	8	Matthew Goller	South Africa	3:57.91	
6	4	6	Youssef Douma	Tunisia	3:58.77	
7	5	1	Thiago Pizzini	Argentina	3:59.10	
8	5	6	Suleyman Ismayilzada	Azerbaijan	3:59.46	
9	4	5	Nicolás Kokidko	Colombia	4:01.21	
10	5	2	Domenico Sotomayor	Peru	4:01.40	
11	3	1	Filippo Aloisi	Italy	4:03.05	
12	4	2	Fabian Janiszewski	Poland	4:03.18	
13	3	2	Daniel Nasredinov	Kyrgyzstan	4:03.35	
14	4	4	Adanuriel Rosal	Venezuela	4:03.82	
15	5	7	Gerd Johan Lessing	Estonia	4:03.94	
16	4	3	Lau Chor Tik	Hong Kong	4:04.94	
17	4	8	Dimitar Dokuzov	Bulgaria	4:06.00	
18	2	5	Ian Alonso	Puerto Rico	4:06.83	
19	3	6	Nejc Kranjc	Slovenia	4:09.33	
20	4	7	Supphakorn Jaikla	Thailand	4:10.16	
21	3	4	Petar Čekov	North Macedonia	4:10.60	
22	3	7	Mohamed Yassine Ben Ajmia	Tunisia	4:10.69	
23	3	8	Santiago Noriega	Guatemala	4:10.79	
24	3	3	Andrés Rojas	Costa Rica	4:12.77	
25	3	5	Mulenga Cole	Zambia	4:13.77	
26	2	3	Josué Matute	Honduras	4:17.15	
27	2	6	Connor Grist	Zimbabwe	4:17.26	
28	2	4	Samuel Camilleri	Malta	4:23.08	
29	2	2	Benjamín Insfrán	Paraguay	4:23.84	
30	1	5	Mark Mwase	Uganda	4:28.12	
31	1	4	Hamed Al-Hasani	Oman	4:29.80	
32	2	7	Adam Ahmed Yacoub	Sudan	4:31.48	
33	1	3	Zack Okumu	Tanzania	4:42.92	
