= 3x3 basketball at the 2026 Summer Youth Olympics – Men's tournament =

Tournament details
- Host country: Senegal
- City: Dakar
- Dates: 6–9 November
- Teams: 12

Final positions
- Champions: Senegal (1st title)
- Runners-up: Lithuania
- Third place: Germany
- Fourth place: Latvia

The men's tournament in 3x3 basketball at the 2026 Summer Youth Olympics was held from 6 to 9 November 2026 at the Complexe Tour de l'Oeuf in Dakar, Senegal.

== Participating teams ==
Group A

- Germany
- Solomon Islands
- Ivory Coast

Group B

- Mongolia
- Argentina
- Venezuela

Group C

- Latvia
- Singapore
- Puerto Rico

Group D

- Algeria
- Lithuania
- Senegal

== Preliminary round ==
All times are local (UTC+0).

=== Pool A ===
Pos	Team	Pld	W	L	PF	PA	PD	Qualification
1	Germany	2	2	0	40	20	+20	Quarterfinals
2	Ivory Coast	2	1	1	37	25	+12	Quarterfinals
3	Solomon Islands	2	0	2	10	42	−32	

Source: IOC
Rules for classification: 1) Wins; 2) Head-to-head record; 3) Points scored.

7 November 2026
10:00

Report

Germany	19–16	Ivory Coast

Complexe Tour de l'Oeuf, Dakar

7 November 2026
11:50

Report

Solomon Islands	6–21	Ivory Coast

Complexe Tour de l'Oeuf, Dakar

7 November 2026
16:00

Report

Germany	21–4	Solomon Islands

Complexe Tour de l'Oeuf, Dakar

=== Pool B ===
Pos	Team	Pld	W	L	PF	PA	PD	Qualification
1	Argentina	2	2	0	38	24	+14	Quarterfinals
2	Mongolia	2	1	1	31	40	−9	Quarterfinals
3	Venezuela	2	0	2	33	38	−5	

Source: IOC
Rules for classification: 1) Wins; 2) Head-to-head record; 3) Points scored.

6 November 2026
10:50

Report

Mongolia	21–19	Venezuela
Pts: Damdin 7		Pts: Villarroel 10

Complexe Tour de l'Oeuf, Dakar
Referees: Monicca Nasuuna (UGA), Ana Vamos (ROU)

6 November 2026
15:00

Report

Argentina	17–14	Venezuela

Complexe Tour de l'Oeuf, Dakar

6 November 2026
16:50

Report

Mongolia	10–21	Argentina

Complexe Tour de l'Oeuf, Dakar

=== Pool C ===
Pos	Team	Pld	W	L	PF	PA	PD	Qualification
1	Latvia	2	2	0	40	26	+14	Quarterfinals
2	Puerto Rico	2	1	1	31	29	+2	Quarterfinals
3	Singapore	2	0	2	23	39	−16	

Source: IOC
Rules for classification: 1) Wins; 2) Head-to-head record; 3) Points scored.

7 November 2026
10:25

Report

Latvia	19–13	Puerto Rico

Complexe Tour de l'Oeuf, Dakar

7 November 2026
12:15

Report

Singapore	10–18	Puerto Rico

Complexe Tour de l'Oeuf, Dakar

7 November 2026
16:25

Report

Latvia	21–13	Singapore

Complexe Tour de l'Oeuf, Dakar

=== Pool D ===
Pos	Team	Pld	W	L	PF	PA	PD	Qualification
1	Senegal (H)	2	2	0	37	25	+12	Quarterfinals
2	Lithuania	2	1	1	29	36	−7	Quarterfinals
3	Algeria	2	0	2	28	33	−5	

Source: IOC
Rules for classification: 1) Wins; 2) Head-to-head record; 3) Points scored.
(H) Hosts

6 November 2026
11:15

Report

Algeria	13–16	Senegal
Pts: Yahiaoui 5		Pts: Cisse 6

Complexe Tour de l'Oeuf, Dakar
Referees: Nie Cong (CHN), Hamish Dale (NZL)

6 November 2026
15:25

Report

Algeria	15–17	Lithuania

Complexe Tour de l'Oeuf, Dakar

6 November 2026
17:15

Report

Senegal	21–12	Lithuania

Complexe Tour de l'Oeuf, Dakar

== Knockout round ==
=== Bracket ===
Quarterfinals
A1	Germany	21
C2	Puerto Rico	14
D1	Senegal	20
B2	Mongolia	11
B1	Argentina	19
D2	Lithuania	21 (OT)
C1	Latvia	20
A2	Ivory Coast	16

Semifinals
A1	Germany	15
D1	Senegal	16 (OT)
D2	Lithuania	21
C1	Latvia	19

Finals
D1	Senegal	14
D2	Lithuania	13
Third place
A1	Germany	21
C1	Latvia	17

=== Quarterfinals ===
8 November 2026
12:20

Report

Germany	21–14	Puerto Rico

Complexe Tour de l'Oeuf, Dakar

8 November 2026
12:45

Report

Senegal	20–11	Mongolia

Complexe Tour de l'Oeuf, Dakar

8 November 2026
15:50

Report

Argentina	19–21 (OT)	Lithuania

Complexe Tour de l'Oeuf, Dakar

8 November 2026
16:15

Report

Latvia	20–16	Ivory Coast

Complexe Tour de l'Oeuf, Dakar

=== Semifinals ===
9 November 2026
12:20

Report

Germany	15– 16 (OT)	Senegal

Complexe Tour de l'Oeuf, Dakar

9 November 2026
12:45

Report

Lithuania	21–19	Latvia

Complexe Tour de l'Oeuf, Dakar

=== Third place game ===
9 November 2026
15:25

Report

Germany	21–17	Latvia

Complexe Tour de l'Oeuf, Dakar

=== Final ===
9 November 2026
16:15

Report

Senegal	14–13 (OT)	Lithuania

Complexe Tour de l'Oeuf, Dakar

== Final standings ==
Rank	Team
1st place, gold medalist(s)	Senegal
2nd place, silver medalist(s)	Lithuania
3rd place, bronze medalist(s)	Germany
4	Latvia
5	Argentina
6	Ivory Coast
7	Puerto Rico
8	Mongolia
9	Venezuela
10	Algeria
11	Singapore
12	Solomon Islands

== See also ==
- 3x3 basketball at the 2026 Summer Youth Olympics – Women's tournament
