= Saint Lucia at the 2026 Summer Youth Olympics =

- Flag of Saint Lucia
- IOC code: LCA
- NOC: Saint Lucia Olympic Committee

in Dakar, Senegal October 31, 2026 – November 13, 2026
- Competitors: 3 in 2 sports
- Flag bearers: Fayth Jeffrey & Noah Dorville
- Medals: Gold 0 Silver 0 Bronze 0 Total 0

Summer Youth Olympics appearances
- 2010; 2014; 2018; 2026

Saint Lucia is scheduled to compete at the 2026 Summer Youth Olympics in Dakar, Senegal from October 31 to November 13, 2026. This will mark Saint Lucia's fourth appearance at the Youth Olympics, after making its debut in 2010.

Swimmers Fayth Jeffrey and Noah Dorville served as the flag bearers for the opening ceremony.

== Competitors ==
The following is the list of number of competitors participating at the Games per sport/discipline.

Sport	Men	Women	Total
Athletics	1	0	1
Swimming	1	1	2
Total	2	1	3

== Athletics ==
Saint Lucia entered one male athlete.

=== Track & road events ===
Men

Athlete	Event	Heat		Semifinal		Final	
Athlete	Event	Result	Rank	Result	Rank	Result	Rank
Kadan Sam	400 m						

== Swimming ==
Saint Lucia entered two swimmers, one male and one female.

Athlete	Event	Heat		Semifinal		Final	
Athlete	Event	Time	Rank	Time	Rank	Time	Rank
Noah Dorville	50 m freestyle						
Noah Dorville	100 m freestyle						
Noah Dorville	200 m freestyle						
Noah Dorville	50 m backstroke						
Fayth Jeffrey	50 m freestyle						
Fayth Jeffrey	100 m freestyle						
Fayth Jeffrey	50 m breaststroke						
Fayth Jeffrey	100 m breaststroke						
