= Athletics at the 2026 Summer Youth Olympics =

Athletics at the IV Summer Youth Olympic Games
- Venue: Complexe Iba Mar Diop
- Dates: 8–10 November
- No. of events: 36
- Competitors: 413 from 170 nations

Athletics at the 2026 Summer Youth Olympics was held from 8 to 10 November. The events took place at the Complexe Iba Mar Diop in Dakar, Senegal.

== Schedule ==
SF	Semi-finals	F	Final

Event ↓ / Date →	Sun 8		Mon 9		Tue 10	
Men's 100 m	SF	F				
Men's 200 m					SF	F
Men's 400 m	SF		F			
Men's 800 m			SF		F	
Men's 1500 m			F			
Men's 3000 m	F					
Men's 110 m hurdles			SF	F		
Men's 400 m hurdles			SF		F	
Men's 2000 m steeplechase			F			
Men's 5000 m walk					F	
Men's high jump			F			
Men's pole vault					F	
Men's long jump	F					
Men's triple jump					F	
Men's shot put			F			
Men's discus throw			F			
Men's hammer throw	F					
Men's javelin throw					F	
Event ↓ / Date →	Sun 8		Mon 9		Tue 10	
Women's 100 m	SF	F				
Women's 200 m					SF	F
Women's 400 m	SF		F			
Women's 800 m	SF		F			
Women's 1500 m					F	
Women's 3000 m			F			
Women's 100 m hurdles	SF	F				
Women's 400 m hurdles			SF		F	
Women's 2000 m steeplechase	F					
Women's 5000 m walk					F	
Women's high jump					F	
Women's pole vault	F					
Women's long jump			F			
Women's triple jump	F					
Women's shot put					F	
Women's discus throw	F					
Women's hammer throw					F	
Women's javelin throw			F			
Event ↓ / Date →	Sun 8		Mon 9		Tue 10	

== Qualification ==
=== Qualification summary ===
The following National Olympic Comitees received a quota place:

Boys

100 m	200 m	400 m	800 m	1500 m	3000 m	110 m hurdles	400 m hurdles	2000 m steeplechase
Azerbaijan; Bangladesh; China; Italy; Laos; Malawi; Monaco; Mozambique; Mauritania; Nigeria; Panama; Palau; Papua New Guinea; Poland; Puerto Rico; Eswatini	Brunei; Ivory Coast; Comoros; Cape Verde; Refugee Olympic Team; Guinea-Bissau; Equatorial Guinea; Greece; Guyana; Hungary; Namibia; Philippines; Chinese Taipei; Zimbabwe	Benin; Botswana; Bulgaria; China; Democratic Republic of the Congo; Cape Verde; Cyprus; The Gambia; Saint Lucia; Malta; Nauru; Singapore; Syria; United Arab Emirates; Venezuela; Saint Vincent and the Grenadines; Zambia	Chad; Cameroon; Cyprus; Denmark; Ecuador; Refugee Olympic Team; Ethiopia; Virgin Islands; Italy; Kenya; Malta; Solomon Islands; Somalia; Tanzania; Timor-Leste; Tunisia; Uganda	Aruba; Burundi; Eritrea; Spain; Ethiopia; Hong Kong; Jordan; Mexico; Portugal; Puerto Rico; Sri Lanka; South Sudan	Algeria; Bhutan; Denmark; Djibouti; Eritrea; Ethiopia; France; Kenya; Lesotho; Mexico; Romania; Chinese Taipei	Albania; Algeria; Austria; Bahamas; China; Estonia; Honduras; Iraq; Jamaica; Saudi Arabia; Mauritius; Poland; Qatar; South Africa; Slovakia	Austria; Brazil; Republic of the Congo; China; Dominican Republic; Fiji; Ghana; Italy; Jamaica; Japan; Malaysia; Montenegro; Nigeria; Turkey; Uruguay	Egypt; Spain; Ethiopia; Iran; Israel; Italy; Kenya; Morocco; Mexico; Peru; Tunisia; Uganda; Yemen
5000 m walk	High jump	Pole vault	Long jump	Triple jump	Shot put	Discus throw	Hammer throw	Javelin throw
Bolivia; China; Croatia; Egypt; Spain; France; Guatemala; Italy; Japan; Tunisia; Ukraine	Bahamas; Brazil; China; Egypt; Lithuania; Nigeria; Poland; South Africa; Chinese Taipei	Egypt; France; Malaysia; Mexico; Poland; Thailand; Turkey; Venezuela	Bulgaria; Burkina Faso; Dominica; Italy; Japan; Kiribati; Suriname; Togo	Belize; China; Greece; Portugal; Senegal; Turkey; Uzbekistan; Zimbabwe	Brazil; Jamaica; South Korea; South Africa; Solomon Islands; Serbia; Tonga	Chile; Egypt; Spain; Jamaica; Kazakhstan; Saudi Arabia; Libya; Pakistan; Samoa	Algeria; Brazil; Ecuador; Egypt; Greece; Guam; Myanmar; South Africa; Slovenia	Colombia; Moldova; Nigeria; Paraguay; Puerto Rico; South Africa; Tajikistan; Tuvalu

Girls

100 m	200 m	400 m	800 m	1500 m	3000 m	100 m hurdles	400 m hurdles	2000 m steeplechase
Armenia; Chile; Ivory Coast; Denmark; Gabon; Guinea-Bissau; Kiribati; Latvia; Liechtenstein; North Macedonia; Mauritania; Nicaragua; Nigeria; Saint Kitts and Nevis; South Sudan; Sudan; United Arab Emirates	Antigua and Barbuda; China; Costa Rica; Cuba; Dominican Republic; Refugee Olympic Team; The Gambia; Georgia; Guinea; Italy; Madagascar; Nauru; Qatar; Seychelles; São Tomé and Príncipe; Syria	Andorra; Chad; Cameroon; Spain; Ethiopia; Lithuania; Nigeria; Rwanda; Senegal; Slovenia; Thailand; Chinese Taipei; United Arab Emirates; Venezuela; Vietnam	Botswana; Central African Republic; Chile; Refugee Olympic Team; El Salvador; Ethiopia; Haiti; Indonesia; Kosovo; Morocco Mali; Philippines; Sierra Leone; Slovenia; Togo	Argentina; Brazil; Cambodia; Djibouti; Ethiopia; Hungary; Kenya; Kyrgyzstan; Morocco; Niger; South Africa; Uganda; Uzbekistan	Argentina; Bulgaria; Eritrea; Ethiopia; Kenya; Lesotho; Mexico; Portugal; Solomon Islands; Uganda	Algeria; Austria; Brazil; Burkina Faso; China; Colombia; France; India; Iraq; British Virgin Islands; South Korea; Nigeria; Portugal; South Africa; Tonga; Uzbekistan	Brazil; Colombia; Ghana; Israel; Virgin Islands; Jamaica; Kazakhstan; Morocco; Nigeria; Romania; South Africa; Samoa; Slovenia; Switzerland; Chinese Taipei; Uzbekistan	El Salvador; Ethiopia; Kenya; Slovenia; Slovakia; Tajikistan; Tunisia; Turkey; Uganda; Uruguay; Uzbekistan
5000 m walk	High jump	Pole vault	Long jump	Triple jump	Shot put	Discus throw	Hammer throw	Javelin throw
China; Ethiopia; Guatemala; Hungary; Italy; Japan; Kenya; Lithuania; Mexico; Peru; Tunisia; Ukraine	Cuba; Ecuador; Estonia; Jamaica; Kuwait; South Africa; Chinese Taipei; Ukraine	Egypt; Spain; France; Greece; Hungary; Japan; Poland	Austria; Bahamas; China; Estonia; Grenada; Italy; Liberia; Morocco; Montenegro	Algeria; Burkina Faso; Spain; Jamaica; Japan; Romania; Senegal; San Marino	Belize; Croatia; Egypt; Estonia; Guam; Hungary; Nigeria; Poland	Cuba; Cyprus; Japan; Mexico; South Africa; Tunisia; Tuvalu; Zimbabwe	Algeria; China; Egypt; Mexico; Myanmar; Portugal; Puerto Rico; Ukraine	Antigua and Barbuda; Bermuda; China; Colombia; Egypt; Latvia; Montenegro; Chinese Taipei; Uzbekistan

== Medal summary ==
=== Medal table ===
* Host nation (Senegal)

Rank	Nation	Gold	Silver	Bronze	Total
1	Ethiopia	5	3	0	8
2	China	3	4	2	9
3	Kenya	3	2	0	5
4	Nigeria	3	0	0	3
5	South Africa	2	2	2	6
6	Jamaica	2	2	1	5
7	France	2	1	1	4
8	Spain	2	0	1	3
9	Japan	1	1	2	4
10	Colombia	1	1	1	3
10	Ukraine	1	1	1	3
10	United Arab Emirates	1	1	1	3
13	Hungary	1	1	0	2
14	Egypt	1	0	3	4
15	Brazil	1	0	0	1
15	Cyprus	1	0	0	1
15	Dominican Republic	1	0	0	1
15	Ecuador	1	0	0	1
15	Italy	1	0	0	1
15	Kuwait	1	0	0	1
15	Paraguay	1	0	0	1
15	Zimbabwe	1	0	0	1
23	Uzbekistan	0	2	0	2
24	Mexico	0	1	2	3
25	Eritrea	0	1	1	2
25	Morocco	0	1	1	2
25	Philippines	0	1	1	2
28	Antigua and Barbuda	0	1	0	1
28	Bulgaria	0	1	0	1
28	Croatia	0	1	0	1
28	Guyana	0	1	0	1
28	Lithuania	0	1	0	1
28	Romania	0	1	0	1
28	Sri Lanka	0	1	0	1
28	Switzerland	0	1	0	1
28	The Gambia	0	1	0	1
28	Tunisia	0	1	0	1
28	Venezuela	0	1	0	1
39	Uganda	0	0	3	3
40	Austria	0	0	2	2
40	Burkina Faso	0	0	2	2
40	Poland	0	0	2	2
43	Chile	0	0	1	1
43	India	0	0	1	1
43	Latvia	0	0	1	1
43	Moldova	0	0	1	1
43	Portugal	0	0	1	1
43	Qatar	0	0	1	1
43	Thailand	0	0	1	1
43	Turkey	0	0	1	1
Totals (50 entries)		36	36	37	109

=== Men's events ===
Games	Gold		Silver		Bronze	
100 m	Gift Bright; Nigeria	10.28 PB	Zhang Hangyu; China	10.57	Szymon Dołęga; Poland	10.61
200 m	Ropafadzo Mzondo; Zimbabwe	21.04	Deuquan' Farrell; Guyana	21.36	Pi Wangkay; Philippines	21.36 PB
400 m	Saeed Omar; United Arab Emirates	46.40	Mustapha Jadama; The Gambia	46.93	Han Liu; China	47.16
800 m	Yomif Abebe; Ethiopia	1:48.99 PB	Ghebreab Mantay; Eritrea	1:49.31 PB	Timothy Cheptoek; Uganda	1:51.59 PB
1500 m	Wabi Seblega; Ethiopia	3:58.73	Lahiru Achintha Gallage; Sri Lanka	3:59.08	Alex Sangil; Spain	3:59.70
3000 m	Enock Tuitoek; Kenya	8:07.69	Goytom Mekonen; Ethiopia	8:08.24 PB	Meziane Benhammou; France	8:11.59
110 m hurdles	Marquies Page; Jamaica	12.95	Shijie Chen; China	13.40	Enrique Bosch; South Africa	13.45
400 m hurdles	Jaeden Campbell; Jamaica	50.60 PB	Noriyuki Takano; Japan	50.88 PB	Zsombor Klucsik; Austria	51.59
2000 m steeplechase	Junedin Abdo; Ethiopia	5:29.30	Wesley Kiplagat Kipkech; Kenya	5:36.28	Michael Kibet; Uganda	5:39.50
5000 m race walk	Gabriel González; Spain	20:41.36	Vitalii Tarasiuk; Ukraine	20:55.54	Futo Abe; Japan	21:09.22
High jump	Matao le Roux; South Africa	2.16 m	Sen Liu; China	2.14 m	Ahmed Mohamed Zaki Mohamed; Egypt	2.09 m
Pole vault	Axel Faye; France	4.95 m	Carlo Crúz; Mexico	4.85 m	Tanakorn Daengmanee; Thailand	4.85 m
Long jump	Koki Hasebe; Japan	7.45 m	Stiliyan Orlinov; Bulgaria	7.30 m	Ibrahim Sawadogo; Burkina Faso	7.23 m
Triple jump	Sheng Xuefeng; China	16.18 m PB	Shakhzodbek Kholmurodov; Uzbekistan	15.71 m PB	João Matos; Portugal	15.53 m PB
Shot put	Pyetro Henrico Souza; Brazil	19.79 m	Xhaevion Kelly; Jamaica	19.34 m	Darius Botha; South Africa	19.23 m
Discus throw	Yahya Sawaby; Egypt	68.23 m	Kamari Kennedy; Jamaica	66.31 m	Vittorio Gorziglia; Chile	56.00 m
Hammer throw	Patry Iván Valdez; Ecuador	73.27 m	John-Pierre Theron; South Africa	71.79 m	Mohamed Ismail; Egypt	69.72 m
Javelin throw	Marco Kaethler; Paraguay	73.49 m PB	Dilan Graciano; Colombia	71.72 m PB	Vladimir Culis; Moldova	67.43 m PB

=== Women's events ===
Games	Gold		Silver		Bronze	
100 m	Rosemary Nwankwo; Nigeria	11.16	Arwa Ali; United Arab Emirates	11.41	Dana Salem; Qatar	11.48
200 m	Patricia Siné; Dominican Republic	23.35 PB	Tyra Fenton; Antigua and Barbuda	23.36	Chen Xinxuan; China	24.03
400 m	Praise Ugoh; Nigeria	52.76	Osmary Pacheco; Venezuela	52.85	Aisha Muhammed; United Arab Emirates	53.06
800 m	Netsanet Selemon; Ethiopia	2:04.43	Naomi Cesar; Philippines	2:09.34	Khadija Elmostaqim; Morocco	2:10.05
1500 m	Elsabet Amare; Ethiopia	4:28.02	Abigael Chepkirui; Kenya	4:29.86	Kanari Estifanos; Eritrea	4:31.10
3000 m	Faith Rono; Kenya	9:15.47	Yordanos Tsigab; Ethiopia	9:15.71	Keren Chelimo; Uganda	9:32.41
100 m hurdles	Zhang Keyi; China	13.17 PB	Anna Peeters; France	13.57	Shourya Avinash Ambure; India	13.59 PB
400 m hurdles	Megan Nieman; South Africa	57.75	Mina Hirsbrunner; Switzerland	57.84	Michell Gómez; Colombia	58.90
2000 m steeplechase	Abigael Kosgei; Kenya	6:30.24 PB	Mekonen Abera; Ethiopia	6:32.15 PB	Elif Çelik; Turkey	6:36.99 PB
5000 m race walk	Wang Yaru; China	22:58.33 PB	Justė Andrijauskaitė; Lithuania	23:55.00	Daryna Kozka; Ukraine	23:58.96 PB
High jump	Yasmeen Roy; Kuwait	1.80 m PB	Milan Blignaut; South Africa	1.74 m	Malia Housen; Jamaica	1.71 m
Pole vault	Julie Bourgis; France	4.20 m	Csenge Zsombor; Hungary	3.80 m	Lena Kaczkowska; Poland	3.60 m
Pole vault	Julie Bourgis; France	4.20 m	Csenge Zsombor; Hungary	3.80 m	Kiyora Matsuura; Japan	3.60 m
Long jump	Poko Silvia Canape; Italy	5.92 m	Maria Saadi; Morocco	5.89 m	Deborah Achleitner; Austria	5.72 m
Triple jump	Gift Okunrobo; Spain	12.69 m	Amelia Negulescu; Romania	12.67 m PB	Zalissa Zongo; Burkina Faso	12.67 m
Shot put	Zsófi Marton; Hungary	16.47 m	Zara Veltruski; Croatia	16.12 m	Alaa Belal; Egypt	15.92 m
Discus throw	Marina Hadjicosta; Cyprus	53.20 m	Katr Ennada Jaoued; Tunisia	49.28 m PB	Kendra Duany; Mexico	48.44 m
Hammer throw	Milaniia Kokhan; Ukraine	71.27 m PB	Yang Xingyue; China	65.96 m	Alison Salinas; Mexico	61.52 m
Javelin throw	Ilsa Mayerlin Córdoba; Colombia	57.62 m	Parizoda Talabova; Uzbekistan	54.68 m	Eliza Ligere; Latvia	52.00 m
