= Palestine at the 2026 Summer Youth Olympics =

- Flag of Palestine
- IOC code: PLE
- NOC: Palestine Olympic Committee

in Dakar, Senegal October 31, 2026 – November 13, 2026
- Competitors: 2 in 1 sport
- Flag bearers: Alma Shaat & Mohammed Zayed
- Medals: Gold 0 Silver 0 Bronze 0 Total 0

Summer Youth Olympics appearances
- 2010; 2014; 2018; 2026

Palestine is scheduled to compete at the 2026 Summer Youth Olympics in Dakar, Senegal from October 31 to November 13, 2026. This will mark Palestine's fourth appearance at the Youth Olympics, after making its debut in 2010.

Swimmers Alma Shaat and Mohammed Zayed served as the flag bearers for the opening ceremony.

== Competitors ==
The following is the list of number of competitors participating at the Games per sport/discipline.

Sport	Men	Women	Total
Swimming	1	1	2
Total	1	1	2

== Swimming ==
Palestine entered two swimmers, one male and one female.

Athlete	Event	Heat		Semifinal		Final	
Athlete	Event	Time	Rank	Time	Rank	Time	Rank
Mohammed Zayed	100 m freestyle	55.05	37	Did not advance			
Mohammed Zayed	200 m freestyle						
Mohammed Zayed	200 m individual medley						
Alma Shaat	50 m breaststroke						
Alma Shaat	100 m breaststroke						
Alma Shaat	200 m breaststroke						
