= Beach volleyball at the 2026 Summer Youth Olympics =

Beach volleyball competitions

Beach volleyball at the IV Summer Youth Olympic Games
- Venue: Saly Beach West
- Dates: 31 October–3 November
- No. of events: 2 (1 men, 1 women)
- Competitors: 96 (48 boys and 48 girls) from 47 nations

Beach volleyball at the 2026 Summer Youth Olympics was held from 31 October to 3 November at the Saly Beach West in Saly Portudal, Senegal.

== Qualification ==
=== Qualification summary ===
The allocation of the quota places was announced in October 2026.

| Men | Women |
|---|---|
| Australia | Argentina |
| Austria | Canada |
| Brazil | Cape Verde |
| Cayman Islands | China |
| Chile | Dominican Republic |
| Democratic Republic of the Congo | Ecuador |
| Germany | Egypt |
| Ghana | France |
| Guatemala | The Gambia |
| Iran | Greece |
| Kazakhstan | Guam |
| Morocco | Italy |
| Namibia | Japan |
| Nicaragua | Malaysia |
| Norway | Mexico |
| Palau | Mozambique |
| Saudi Arabia | Netherlands |
| Senegal | Nigeria |
| Sierra Leone | Paraguay |
| South Africa | Puerto Rico |
| Sweden | Switzerland |
| Turkey | Senegal |
| Venezuela | Thailand |
| United States | Tunisia |

== Medal summary ==
=== Medal table ===
* Host nation (Senegal)

| Rank | Nation | Gold | Silver | Bronze | Total |
|---|---|---|---|---|---|
| 1 | Austria | 1 | 0 | 0 | 1 |
| 1 | Netherlands | 1 | 0 | 0 | 1 |
| 3 | Germany | 0 | 1 | 0 | 1 |
| 3 | Italy | 0 | 1 | 0 | 1 |
| 5 | Australia | 0 | 0 | 1 | 1 |
| 5 | Switzerland | 0 | 0 | 1 | 1 |
| Totals (6 entries) | | 2 | 2 | 2 | 6 |

=== Events ===
| Event | Gold | Silver | Bronze |
|---|---|---|---|
| Men | Austria; Paul Hohenauer; Martin Poinstingl | Germany; Lasse Hüper; Filo Wüst | Australia; Ryan Edgar; Thomas Turner |
| Women | Netherlands; Jara Both; Matilda de Groot | Italy; Margherita Coretti; Micol Lafuenti | Switzerland; Noemi Eugster; Anja Gähwiler |
