= Cape Verde at the 2026 Summer Youth Olympics =

- Flag of Cape Verde
- IOC code: CPV
- NOC: Comité Olímpico Caboverdeano

in Dakar, Senegal October 31, 2026 – November 13, 2026
- Competitors: 8 in 4 sports
- Flag bearers: Yenda Mendes & Myles Gonçalves
- Medals: Gold 0 Silver 0 Bronze 0 Total 0

Summer Youth Olympics appearances
- 2010; 2014; 2018; 2026

Cape Verde is scheduled to compete at the 2026 Summer Youth Olympics in Dakar, Senegal from October 31 to November 13, 2026. This will mark Cape Verde's fourth appearance at the Youth Olympics, after making its debut in 2010.

Beach volleyball player Yenda Mendes and swimmer Myles Gonçalves served as the flag bearers for the opening ceremony.

== Competitors ==
The following is the list of number of competitors participating at the Games per sport/discipline.

Sport	Men	Women	Total
Athletics	2	0	2
Beach volleyball	0	2	2
Judo	1	0	1
Swimming	1	2	3
Total	4	4	8

== Athletics ==
Cape Verde entered two male athletes.

=== Track & road events ===
Men

Athlete	Event	Semifinal		Final	
Athlete	Event	Result	Rank	Result	Rank
Lucas Delgado	200 m				
Leandro Duarte	400 m	1:28.19	16		

== Beach volleyball ==
Cape Verde received a quota place for the women's tournament.

Summary

Team	Event	Group stage				Round of 16	Quarterfinals	Semifinals	Final / BM	
Team	Event	Opposition Result	Opposition Result	Opposition Result	Rank	Opposition Result	Opposition Result	Opposition Result	Opposition Result	Rank
Gabriela dos Reis; Yenda Mendes	Women's tournament									

== Judo ==
Cape Verde entered one male judoka based on the available quotas assigned by the International Judo Federation.

Men

Athlete	Event	Round of 16	Quarterfinals	Semifinals	Repechage 1	Repechage 2	Final	
Athlete	Event	Opposition Result	Opposition Result	Opposition Result	Opposition Result	Opposition Result	Opposition Result	Rank
Edvanio Fidalgo	–66 kg							

== Swimming ==
Cape Verde entered three swimmers, one male and two female.

Athlete	Event	Heat		Final	
Athlete	Event	Time	Rank	Time	Rank
Myles Gonçalves	50 m freestyle				
Myles Gonçalves	100 m freestyle				
Myles Gonçalves	100 m backstroke				
Myles Gonçalves	50 m butterfly				
Kayra Tati	50 m freestyle				
Kayra Tati	100 m freestyle				
Kayra Tati	50 m breaststroke				
Kayra Tati	50 m butterfly				
Kaila Dacruz	200 m freestyle				
Kaila Dacruz	50 m backstroke				
Kaila Dacruz	100 m backstroke				
Kaila Dacruz	200 m backstroke				
