= Bahamas at the 2026 Summer Youth Olympics =

- Flag of Bahamas
- IOC code: BAH
- NOC: Bahamas Olympic Committee

in Dakar, Senegal October 31, 2026 – November 13, 2026
- Competitors: 5 in 2 sports
- Flag bearers: Seleste Gibson & Christon Joseph
- Medals: Gold 0 Silver 0 Bronze 0 Total 0

Summer Youth Olympics appearances
- 2010; 2014; 2018; 2026

Bahamas is scheduled to compete at the 2026 Summer Youth Olympics in Dakar, Senegal from October 31 to November 13, 2026. This will mark Bahamas's fourth appearance at the Youth Olympics, after making its debut in 2010.

Swimmers Saleste Gibson and Christon Joseph served as the flag bearers for the opening ceremony.

== Competitors ==
The following is the list of number of competitors participating at the Games per sport/discipline.

Sport	Men	Women	Total
Athletics	2	1	3
Swimming	1	1	2
Total	3	2	3

== Athletics ==
Bahamas entered three athletes, two male and one female.

=== Track & road events ===
Men

Athlete	Event	Heat		Semifinal		Final	
Athlete	Event	Result	Rank	Result	Rank	Result	Rank
Shawne Ferguson	110 m hurdles						

=== Field events ===
Men

Athlete	Event	Qualification		Final	
Athlete	Event	Distance	Position	Distance	Position
Ashley Demeritte	High jump				

Women

Athlete	Event	Qualification		Final	
Athlete	Event	Distance	Position	Distance	Position
Keely Deveaux	Long jump				

== Swimming ==
Bahamas entered two swimmers, one male and one female.

Athlete	Event	Heat		Semifinal		Final	
Athlete	Event	Time	Rank	Time	Rank	Time	Rank
Christon Joseph	50 m freestyle						
Christon Joseph	100 m freestyle						
Christon Joseph	50 m breaststroke						
Christon Joseph	50 m butterfly						
Salenste Gibson	100 m freestyle						
Salenste Gibson	200 m freestyle						
Salenste Gibson	50 m butterfly						
Salenste Gibson	100 m butterfly						
