= Cameroon at the 2026 Summer Youth Olympics =

- Flag of Cameroon
- IOC code: CMR
- NOC: Cameroon Olympic and Sports Committee
- Website: www.cnosc.org

in Dakar, Senegal October 31, 2026 – November 13, 2026
- Competitors: 18 in 6 sports
- Flag bearer: Myriam Nsame Mbongo
- Medals: Gold 0 Silver 0 Bronze 0 Total 0

Summer Youth Olympics appearances
- 2010; 2014; 2018; 2026

Cameroon is competing at the 2026 Summer Youth Olympics in Dakar, Senegal, from October 31 to November 13, 2026. It is the country's fourth appearance at the Youth Olympic Games. Cameroon made its debut in 2010.

Cameroon sent 18 athletes in six sports. Judoka Myriam Nsame Mbongo was the flag bearer at the opening ceremony.

== Competitors ==
Myriam Nsame Mbongo was the flag bearer at the opening ceremony. The following table shows the number of competitors in each sport.

Sport	Men	Women	Total
Artistic gymnastics	1	1	2
Athletics	1	1	2
Futsal	0	10	10
Judo	0	1	1
Swimming	1	1	2
Taekwondo	1	0	1
Total	4	14	18

== Artistic gymnastics ==
Cameroon entered two gymnasts, one male and one female.

Men
Individual

Athlete	Event	Qualification								Final							
Athlete	Event	Apparatus						Total	Rank	Apparatus						Total	Rank
Athlete	Event	F	PH	R	V	PB	HB	Total	Rank	F	PH	R	V	PB	HB	Total	Rank
Célestin Simba	All-around																

Women
Individual

Athlete	Event	Qualification						Final					
Athlete	Event	Apparatus				Total	Rank	Apparatus				Total	Rank
Athlete	Event	V	UB	BB	F	Total	Rank	V	UB	BB	F	Total	Rank
Sarah Gomwouo	All-around												

Mixed
Mixed team

Athlete	Event	Round	Final						
Athlete	Event	Round	Apparatus					Total	Rank
Athlete	Event	Round	F	PB	HB	UB	BB	Total	Rank
Sarah Gomwouo	Mixed team	1		—N/a				—N/a	
Sarah Gomwouo	Mixed team	2		—N/a				—N/a	
Sarah Gomwouo	Mixed team	3		—N/a				—N/a	
Célestin Simba	Mixed team	1				—N/a		—N/a	
Célestin Simba	Mixed team	2				—N/a		—N/a	
Célestin Simba	Mixed team	3				—N/a		—N/a	
Total	Mixed team	—N/a							

== Athletics ==
Cameroon entered two athletes, one of each gender.

Track events

Athlete	Event	Semifinal		Final	
Athlete	Event	Result	Rank	Result	Rank
Emeraude Tchouta Fonkeu	Men's 800 m				
Djanaba Issa	Women's 400 m				

== Futsal ==
Cameroon entered a team for the women's tournament.

Summary

Event	Group stage				Semifinal	Final / BM	
Event	Opposition Score	Opposition Score	Opposition Score	Rank	Opposition Score	Opposition Score	Rank
Women's tournament	Italy; L 2–4	Iran; L 3–5	Costa Rica; W 7–0	3	Did not advance		

Roster

- Arlette Tchewa
- Kerda Elong
- Andrea Mimbama
- Nouranne Nsangou
- Caline Enama
- Grace Tejeona
- Ann Miyanui
- Bernadette Oyie
- Soualai Bolda
- Rachidatou Leong

== Judo ==
Cameroon entered one female judoka based on the available quotas assigned by the International Judo Federation.

Women

Athlete	Event	Round of 16	Quarterfinals	Semifinals	Repechage 1	Repechage 2	Final	
Athlete	Event	Opposition Result	Opposition Result	Opposition Result	Opposition Result	Opposition Result	Opposition Result	Rank
Myriam Nsame Mbongo	–52 kg							

== Swimming ==
Cameroon entered two swimmers, one of each gender.

Athlete	Event	Heat		Final	
Athlete	Event	Time	Rank	Time	Rank
Jerry Yossa	100 m freestyle				
Jerry Yossa	50 m backstroke				
Jerry Yossa	50 m butterfly				
Ceylia Djeutcha	50 m freestyle				
Ceylia Djeutcha	50 m breaststroke				

== Taekwondo ==
Cameroon entered one male athlete.

Men

Athlete	Event	Round of 16	Quarterfinals	Semifinals	Repechage	Final / BM	
Athlete	Event	Opposition Result	Opposition Result	Opposition Result	Opposition Result	Opposition Result	Rank
Loann Kylian Dzukou Kamsu	−48 kg						
