= Puerto Rico at the 2026 Summer Youth Olympics =

- Flag of Puerto Rico
- IOC code: PUR
- NOC: Puerto Rico Olympic Committee
- Website: www.copur.pr

in Dakar, Senegal October 31, 2026 – November 13, 2026
- Competitors: 30 in 11 sports
- Flag bearers: Esmeralda Butler & Steven Moreno
- Medals: Gold 0 Silver 0 Bronze 0 Total 0

Summer Youth Olympics appearances
- 2010; 2014; 2018; 2026

Puerto Rico is scheduled to compete at the 2026 Summer Youth Olympics in Dakar, Senegal from October 31 to November 13, 2026. This will mark Puerto Rico's fourth appearance at the Youth Olympics, after making its debut in 2010.

Skateboarder Esmeralda Butler and table tennis player Steven Moreno served as the flag bearers for the opening ceremony.

== Competitors ==
The following is the list of number of competitors participating at the Games per sport/discipline.

Sport	Men	Women	Total
3x3 basketball	4	0	4
Athletics	3	1	4
Beach handball	10	0	10
Beach volleyball	0	2	2
Beach wrestling	2	1	3
Boxing	1	0	1
Judo	0	1	1
Table tennis	1	1	2
Skateboarding	0	1	1
Swimming	1	0	1
Triathlon	1	0	1
Total	23	7	30

== 3x3 basketball ==
Puerto Rico entered a team for the men's tournament as one of the three participating teams from the Americas.

Summary

Event	Pool play			Quarterfinal	Semifinal	Final / BM	
Event	Opposition Score	Opposition Score	Group Rank	Opposition Score	Opposition Score	Opposition Score	Rank
Men's tournament							

Roster

- Fernando Camareno
- Johamil Correa
- Jorge Echeandía
- Luis Rosado

== Athletics ==
Puerto Rico entered four athletes, three male and one female.

=== Track & road events ===
Men

Athlete	Event	Heat		Semifinal		Final	
Athlete	Event	Result	Rank	Result	Rank	Result	Rank
Manuel Pérez	100 m hurdles						
Christjan Estevez	1500 m						

=== Field events ===
Men

Athlete	Event	Qualification		Final	
Athlete	Event	Distance	Position	Distance	Position
Jonathan González	Javelin throw				

Women

Athlete	Event	Qualification		Final	
Athlete	Event	Distance	Position	Distance	Position
Kenielys López	Hammer throw				

== Beach handball ==
Puerto Rico entered a team for the men's tournament.

Summary

Event	Group stage				Quarterfinals	5th-8th Classification	Semifinals	Final / PG / BM	
Event	Opposition Result	Opposition Result	Opposition Result	Rank	Opposition Result	Opposition Result	Opposition Result	Opposition Result	Rank
Men's tournament	Brazil	Hungary	Senegal						

Roster

- Yeray Babilonia
- Jaziel Carrión
- Jerik Díaz
- Dylan Figueroa
- Liam García
- Jean Paul González
- Albert Pizarro
- Janvier Rivera
- Gibrant Rosa
- Ian Torres

== Beach volleyball ==
Puerto Rico received a quota place for the women's tournament.

Summary

Team	Event	Group stage				Round of 16	Quarterfinals	Semifinals	Final / PG / BM	
Team	Event	Opposition Result	Opposition Result	Opposition Result	Rank	Opposition Result	Opposition Result	Opposition Result	Opposition Result	Rank
Arialeey Serrano; Dana Rodríguez	Women's tournament									

== Beach wrestling ==
Puerto Rico entered three athletes, two male and one female.

Men

Athlete	Weight	Round of 16	Quarterfinals	Semifinals	Final / BM	
Athlete	Weight	Opposition Result	Opposition Result	Opposition Result	Opposition Result	Rank
Joab Carrillo	-70 kg					
Layden Acevedo	-80 kg					

Women

Athlete	Weight	Round of 16	Quarterfinals	Semifinals	Final / BM	
Athlete	Weight	Opposition Result	Opposition Result	Opposition Result	Opposition Result	Rank
Victoria Rivera	-45 kg					

== Boxing ==
Puerto Rico entered one male athlete in the -60 kg category.

Men

Athlete	Weight	Round of 16	Quarterfinals	Semifinals	Final / BM	
Athlete	Weight	Opposition Result	Opposition Result	Opposition Result	Opposition Result	Rank
Jesfred Torres	-60 kg	BYE	Mauritius Agathe; W KO	China Zhang; W WP (5–0)	Thailand Chainarong []	

== Judo ==
Puerto Rico entered one female judoka based on the available quotas assigned by the International Judo Federation.

Women

Athlete	Event	Round of 16	Quarterfinals	Semifinals	Repechage	Final / BM	
Athlete	Event	Opposition Result	Opposition Result	Opposition Result	Opposition Result	Opposition Result	Rank
Lenishka Figueroa	-78 kg						

== Skateboarding ==
Puerto Rico entered one female athlete based on available quotas.

Athlete	Event	Semifinal		Final	
Athlete	Event	Result	Rank	Result	Rank
Esmeralda Butler	Women's street				

== Swimming ==
Puerto Rico entered one male swimmer.

Athlete	Event	Heat		Semifinal		Final	
Athlete	Event	Time	Rank	Time	Rank	Time	Rank
Ian Alonso	100 m freestyle						
Ian Alonso	200 m freestyle						
Ian Alonso	400 m freestyle						

== Table tennis ==
Puerto Rico entered two athletes (one male and one female).

Athlete	Event	Preliminary	Round 1	Round 2	Round 3	Round of 16	Quarterfinals	Semifinals	Final / BM	
Athlete	Event	Opposition Result	Opposition Result	Opposition Result	Opposition Result	Opposition Result	Opposition Result	Opposition Result	Opposition Result	Rank
Steven Moreno	Men's singles									
Valentina Dávila	Women's singles									
Steven Moreno; Valentina Dávila	Mixed doubles									

== Triathlon ==
Puerto Rico entered one male athlete.

Athlete	Event	Time						Rank
Athlete	Event	Swim (750m)	Trans 1	Bike (20km)	Trans 2	Run (5km)	Total	Rank
Eduardo Carretero	Men's individual							
