= Kiribati at the 2026 Summer Youth Olympics =

- Flag of Kiribati
- IOC code: KIR
- NOC: Kiribati National Olympic Committee

in Dakar, Senegal October 31, 2026 – November 13, 2026
- Competitors: 2 in 1 sport
- Flag bearers: Tuata Tatoa & Ritencooper Kobebe
- Medals: Gold 0 Silver 0 Bronze 0 Total 0

Summer Youth Olympics appearances
- 2010; 2014; 2018; 2026

Kiribati is scheduled to compete at the 2026 Summer Youth Olympics in Dakar, Senegal from October 31 to November 13, 2026. This will mark Kiribati's fourth appearance at the Youth Olympics, after making its debut in 2010.

Athletes Tuata Tatoa and Ritencooper Kobebe served as the flag bearers for the opening ceremony.

== Competitors ==
The following is the list of number of competitors participating at the Games per sport/discipline.

Sport	Men	Women	Total
Athletics	1	1	2
Total	1	1	2

== Athletics ==
Kiribati entered two athletes, one male and one female.

=== Track & road events ===
Women

Athlete	Event	Heat		Semifinal		Final	
Athlete	Event	Result	Rank	Result	Rank	Result	Rank
Tuata Tatoa	100 m						

=== Field events ===
Men

Athlete	Event	Qualification		Final	
Athlete	Event	Distance	Position	Distance	Position
Ritencooper Kobebe	Long jump				
