= Solomon Islands at the 2026 Summer Youth Olympics =

- Flag of Solomon Islands
- IOC code: SOL
- NOC: National Olympic Committee of Solomon Islands
- Website: www.nocsi.org.sb

in Dakar, Senegal October 31, 2026 – November 13, 2026
- Competitors: 17 in 3 sports
- Flag bearer: Emmanuel Suimae
- Medals: Gold 0 Silver 0 Bronze 0 Total 0

Summer Youth Olympics appearances
- 2010; 2014; 2018; 2026

The Solomon Islands are scheduled to compete at the 2026 Summer Youth Olympics in Dakar, Senegal from October 31 to November 13, 2026. This will mark Solomon Islands's fourth appearance at the Youth Olympics, after making its debut in 2010.

Futsal player Emmanuel Suimae served as the flag bearer for the opening ceremony.

== Competitors ==
The following is the list of number of competitors participating at the Games per sport/discipline.

Sport	Boys	Girls	Total
3x3 basketball	4	0	0
Athletics	2	1	3
Futsal	10	0	0
Total	16	1	17

== Athletics ==
Solomon Islands entered three athletes, two male and one female.

Track events
Men

Athlete	Event	Heat		Final	
Athlete	Event	Result	Rank	Result	Rank
Gabriel Ini	Men's 800 metres				
Salvina Jalisma	Women's 3000 metres	—N/a			

Field events

Athlete	Event	Final	
Athlete	Event	Distance	Rank
Donald Aba	Men's shot put		

== 3x3 basketball ==
Solomon Islands entered a team for the men's tournament as one of the three participating teams from the Americas.

Summary

Event	Pool play			Quarterfinal	Semifinal	Final / BM	
Event	Opposition Score	Opposition Score	Rank	Opposition Score	Opposition Score	Opposition Score	Rank
Men's tournament	Ivory Coast	Germany					

Roster

- Eljay Akofia
- Tony Buga
- George Nunu
- Ulric Soaki

== Futsal ==
Solomon Islands entered a team for the men's tournament.

Summary

Event	Group stage				Semifinal	Final / BM	
Event	Opposition Score	Opposition Score	Opposition Score	Group Rank	Opposition Score	Opposition Score	Rank
Men's tournament	Portugal; L 1–11	Morocco	Paraguay; L 2–9				

Roster

- Primo Asimae
- Jerom Billy
- Charles Daomae
- Ben Hendry
- Anon Hou
- Chris Kwamae
- Jerol Mani
- Emmanuel Suimae
- Maxwell Tahioa
- Ajay Ufaria
