= Table tennis at the 2026 Summer Youth Olympics =

Table tennis at the IV Summer Youth Olympic Games
- Venue: Dakar Expo Center
- Dates: 31 October–5 November
- No. of events: 3 (1, boys, 1 girls, 1 mixed)
- Competitors: 64 from 41 nations

Table tennis at the 2026 Summer Youth Olympics was held from 31 October to 5 November. The event took place at Dakar Expo Center in Diamniadio, Senegal.

This is the first time the national team from China failed to win a single medal. The men's singles and mixed doubles suffered a quarterfinal exit whilst the women's singles player went out in the round of 16.

== Qualification ==
The allocation of the available quota places was announced by the International Table Tennis Federation on 14 October 2026.

NOC	Boys	Girls	Mixed
Algeria	Yes	Yes	Yes
Antigua and Barbuda	No	Yes	No
Argentina	Yes	No	No
Australia	Yes	Yes	Yes
Austria	No	Yes	No
Benin	Yes	No	No
Brazil	Yes	Yes	Yes
Chile	No	Yes	No
China	Yes	Yes	Yes
Chinese Taipei	Yes	Yes	Yes
Colombia	Yes	No	No
Costa Rica	Yes	No	No
Czech Republic	No	Yes	No
Ecuador	Yes	Yes	Yes
Egypt	Yes	Yes	Yes
France	Yes	Yes	Yes
Germany	Yes	Yes	Yes
Ghana	No	Yes	No
Hong Kong	Yes	Yes	Yes
India	No	Yes	No
Iran	Yes	No	No
Italy	Yes	No	No
Japan	Yes	Yes	Yes
Luxembourg	Yes	No	No
Madagascar	No	Yes	No
Nigeria	Yes	Yes	Yes
New Zealand	Yes	Yes	Yes
Peru	Yes	Yes	Yes
Poland	Yes	Yes	Yes
Portugal	No	Yes	No
Puerto Rico	Yes	Yes	Yes
Romania	Yes	Yes	Yes
Senegal	Yes	Yes	Yes
Singapore	No	Yes	No
Spain	Yes	No	No
South Korea	Yes	Yes	Yes
Thailand	Yes	Yes	Yes
Turkey	Yes	No	No
Tunisia	Yes	Yes	Yes
Uganda	Yes	Yes	Yes
Venezuela	Yes	Yes	Yes

== Medal summary ==
=== Medal table ===
* Host nation (Senegal)

Rank	Nation	Gold	Silver	Bronze	Total
1	Japan	2	0	0	2
2	Chinese Taipei	1	0	1	2
3	Hong Kong	0	1	1	2
4	Colombia	0	1	0	1
4	Singapore	0	1	0	1
6	South Korea	0	0	1	1
Totals (6 entries)		3	3	3	9

=== Medalists ===
Event	Gold	Silver	Bronze
Men's singles	Ryuusei Kawakami; Japan	Emanuel Otalvaro; Colombia	Lee Seung-soo; South Korea
Women's singles	Chen Min-hsin; Chinese Taipei	Loy Ming Ying; Singapore	Su Tsz Tung; Hong Kong
Mixed doubles	Japan; Ryuusei Kawakami; Miku Matsushima	Hong Kong; Su Tsz Tung; Li Ki Ho	Chinese Taipei; Lin Chin-ting; Chen Min-hsin
