= The Gambia at the 2026 Summer Youth Olympics =

- Flag of Gambia
- IOC code: GAM
- NOC: Gambia National Olympic Committee
- Website: www.gnoc.gm

in Dakar, Senegal October 31, 2026 – November 13, 2026
- Competitors: 7 in 5 sports
- Flag bearers: Fatou D. Sabally & Mustapha Jadama
- Medals: Gold 0 Silver 1 Bronze 0 Total 1

Summer Youth Olympics appearances
- 2010; 2014; 2018; 2026

The Gambia is scheduled to compete at the 2026 Summer Youth Olympics in Dakar, Senegal from October 31 to November 13, 2026. This will mark Gambia's fourth appearance at the Youth Olympics, after making its debut in 2010.

Swimmer Fatou D. Sabally and athlete Mustapha Jadama served as the flag bearers for the opening ceremony.

== Competitors ==
The following is the list of number of competitors participating at the Games per sport/discipline.

Sport	Men	Women	Total
Athletics	1	1	2
Beach volleyball	0	2	2
Boxing	1	0	1
Judo	0	1	1
Swimming	0	1	1
Total	2	5	7

== Athletics ==
Gambia entered two athletes, one of each gender.

=== Track & road events ===
Men

Athlete	Event	Heat		Semifinal		Final	
Athlete	Event	Result	Rank	Result	Rank	Result	Rank
Mustapha Jadama	400 m						

Women

Athlete	Event	Heat		Semifinal		Final	
Athlete	Event	Result	Rank	Result	Rank	Result	Rank
Haddy Jarju	200 m						

== Beach volleyball ==
Gambia received a quota place for the women's tournament.

Summary

Team	Event	Group stage				Round of 16	Quarterfinals	Semifinals	Final / BM	
Team	Event	Opposition Result	Opposition Result	Opposition Result	Rank	Opposition Result	Opposition Result	Opposition Result	Opposition Result	Rank
Kaddy Saidy; Fatima Sanneh	Women's tournament									

== Boxing ==
Gambia entered one male athlete in the −55 kg category.

Men

Athlete	Weight	Round of 16	Quarterfinals	Semifinals	Final	
Athlete	Weight	Opposition Result	Opposition Result	Opposition Result	Opposition Result	Rank
Alieu Sanyang	–55 kg					

== Judo ==
Gambia entered one female judoka based on the available quotas assigned by the International Judo Federation.

Women

Athlete	Event	Round of 16	Quarterfinals	Semifinals	Repechage 1	Repechage 2	Final	
Athlete	Event	Opposition Result	Opposition Result	Opposition Result	Opposition Result	Opposition Result	Opposition Result	Rank
Alima Jobe	–52 kg							

== Swimming ==
Gambia entered one female swimmer.

Athlete	Event	Heat		Final	
Athlete	Event	Time	Rank	Time	Rank
Fatou D. Sabally	50 m freestyle				
