= Liberia at the 2026 Summer Youth Olympics =

- Flag of Liberia
- IOC code: LBR
- NOC: Liberia National Olympic Committee
- Website: www.liberianoc.org

in Dakar, Senegal October 31, 2026 – November 13, 2026
- Competitors: 2 in 2 sports
- Flag bearer: Francis Vulue
- Medals: Gold 0 Silver 0 Bronze 0 Total 0

Summer Youth Olympics appearances
- 2010; 2014; 2018; 2026

Liberia is scheduled to compete at the 2026 Summer Youth Olympics in Dakar, Senegal from October 31 to November 13, 2026. This will mark Liberia's fourth appearance at the Youth Olympics, after making its debut in 2010.

Taekwondo practitioner Francis Vulue served as the flag bearer for the opening ceremony.

== Competitors ==
The following is the list of number of competitors participating at the Games per sport/discipline.

Sport	Men	Women	Total
Athletics	0	1	1
Taekwondo	1	0	1
Total	1	1	2

== Athletics ==
Liberia entered one female athlete.

=== Field events ===
Women

Athlete	Event	Final	
Athlete	Event	Distance	Position
Garmai Lewis	Long jump		

== Taekwondo ==
Liberia entered one male athlete.

Men

Athlete	Event	Round of 16	Quarterfinals	Semifinals	Repechage	Final / BM	
Athlete	Event	Opposition Result	Opposition Result	Opposition Result	Opposition Result	Opposition Result	Rank
Francis Vulue	-55 kg	Bye					
