= Lesotho at the 2026 Summer Youth Olympics =

- Flag of Lesotho
- IOC code: LES
- NOC: Lesotho National Olympic Committee
- Website: www.lnoc.org.ls

in Dakar, Senegal October 31, 2026 – November 13, 2026
- Competitors: 2 in 1 sport
- Flag bearers: Matebatso Lelaka & Katiso Liau
- Medals: Gold 0 Silver 0 Bronze 0 Total 0

Summer Youth Olympics appearances
- 2010; 2014; 2018; 2026

Lesotho is scheduled to compete at the 2026 Summer Youth Olympics in Dakar, Senegal from October 31 to November 13, 2026. This will mark Lesotho's fourth appearance at the Youth Olympics, after making its debut in 2010.

Athletes Matebatso Lelaka and Katiso Liau served as the flag bearers for the opening ceremony.

== Competitors ==
The following is the list of number of competitors participating at the Games per sport/discipline.

Sport	Men	Women	Total
Athletics	1	1	2
Total	1	1	2

== Athletics ==
Lesotho entered two athletes, one of each gender.

=== Track & road events ===
Men

Athlete	Event	Semifinal		Final	
Athlete	Event	Result	Rank	Result	Rank
Katiso Liau	3000 m				

Women

Athlete	Event	Semifinal		Final	
Athlete	Event	Result	Rank	Result	Rank
Matebatso Lelaka	3000 m				
