= Singapore at the 2026 Summer Youth Olympics =

- Flag of Singapore
- IOC code: SGP
- NOC: Singapore National Olympic Council
- Website: www.singaporeolympics.com

in Dakar, Senegal October 31, 2026 – November 13, 2026
- Competitors: 14
- Flag bearers: Ming Ying Loi & Zhen Hong Zack Ng
- Medals: Gold 1 Silver 1 Bronze 0 Total 2

Summer Youth Olympics appearances
- 2010; 2014; 2018; 2026

Singapore is scheduled to compete at the 2026 Summer Youth Olympics in Dakar, Senegal from October 31 to November 13, 2026. This will mark Singapore's fourth appearance at the Youth Olympics, after making its debut in 2010.

Table tennis player Ming Ying Loi and badminton player Zhen Hong Zack Ng served as the flag bearers for the opening ceremony.

== Competitors ==
The following is the list of number of competitors participating at the Games per sport/discipline.

Sport	Men	Women	Total
3x3 basketball	4	0	4
Archery	0	1	1
Artistic gymnastics	1	1	2
Athletics	1	0	1
Badminton	1	0	1
Fencing	1	0	1
Sailing	1	1	2
Table tennis	0	1	1
Wushu	0	1	1
Total	9	5	14

== 3x3 basketball ==
Singapore entered a team for the men's tournament as one of the three participating teams from the Americas.

Summary

Event	Pool play			Quarterfinal	Semifinal	Final / BM	
Event	Opposition Score	Opposition Score	Group Rank	Opposition Score	Opposition Score	Opposition Score	Rank
Men's tournament							

Roster

- Matthew Cheng
- Fred Leow
- Mason Lim
- Jaden Ng

== Archery ==
Singapore entered one female archer.

Women

Athlete	Event	Ranking Round		Round of 16	Quarterfinals	Semifinals	Final / BM	Rank
Athlete	Event	Score	Seed	Opposition Score	Opposition Score	Opposition Score	Opposition Score	Rank
Tabitha Ern Lin Yeo	Individual							

== Artistic gymnastics ==
Singapore entered two gymnasts, one male and one female.

Boys

Athlete	Event	Qualification								Final							
Athlete	Event	Apparatus						Total	Rank	Apparatus						Total	Rank
Athlete	Event	F	PH	R	V	PB	HB	Total	Rank	F	PH	R	V	PB	HB	Total	Rank
Xavier Pang	All-around	10.766	9.400	10.600	12.466	9.766	10.966	63.964	51	did not qualify							

Girls

Athlete	Event	Qualification						Final					
Athlete	Event	Apparatus				Total	Rank	Apparatus				Total	Rank
Athlete	Event	V	UB	BB	F	Total	Rank	V	UB	BB	F	Total	Rank
Emmanuelle Hui En Tan	All-around	11.933	10.666	10.466	11.433	44.498	34	did not qualify					

== Athletics ==
Singapore entered one male athlete.

=== Track & road events ===
Men

Athlete	Event	Heat		Semifinal		Final	
Athlete	Event	Result	Rank	Result	Rank	Result	Rank
Daryen Ko	400 m hurdles			52.87	4 Q		

== Badminton ==
Singapore entered one male athlete.

Athlete	Event	Group Stage				Quarterfinals	Semifinals	Final / BM	
Athlete	Event	Opposition Result	Opposition Result	Opposition Result	Rank	Opposition Result	Opposition Result	Opposition Result	Rank
Zhen Hong Zack Ng	Men's singles	Fabricio Rodríguez (VEN); W 2-0	Punnatat Prempunpong (THA); L 0-2	—N/a	2	Did not Advance			

== Fencing ==
Singapore entered one male athlete.

Athlete	Event	Round of 64	Round of 32	Round of 16	Quarterfinal	Semifinal	Final / BM	
Athlete	Event	Opposition Score	Opposition Score	Opposition Score	Opposition Score	Opposition Score	Opposition Score	Rank
Ashton Auw	Men's sabre							

== Sailing ==
Singapore entered two athletes, one of each gender.

Athlete	Event	Opening Series – Points per Race											Total points	Net points	Final rank
Athlete	Event	1	2	3	4	5	6	7	8	9	10	M	Total points	Net points	Final rank
Trevor Ng	Men's windsurfing														
Kate Teo	Women's windsurfing														

== Table tennis ==
Singapore entered one female athlete.

Athlete	Event	Group stage				Round of 32	Round of 16	Quarterfinal	Semifinal	Final	
Athlete	Event	Opposition Result	Opposition Result	Opposition Result	Rank	Opposition Result	Opposition Result	Opposition Result	Opposition Result	Opposition Result	Rank
Ming Ying Loy	Women's singles	Xie Daisy (AUS); W 3-1	Heo Yerim (KOR); L 2-3	Ela Saidi (TUR); W 3-1	2 Q	—N/a	Syndrela Das (IND); W 4-0	Nina Guo Zheng (FRA); W 4-1	Su Tze Tung (HKG); W 4-2	Chen Minhsin (TPE); W 4-2	2nd place, silver medalist(s)

== Wushu ==
Singapore entered one female athlete after quotas were assigned by the International Wushu Federation.

Athlete	Event	Preliminary Stage						Final Stage					
Athlete	Event	Taijishan routine		Taijiquan routine		Total Points	Final Rank	Taijishan routine		Taijiquan routine		Total Points	Final Rank
Athlete	Event	Points	Rank	Points	Rank	Total Points	Final Rank	Points	Rank	Points	Rank	Total Points	Final Rank
Zhe Nin Ng	Women's taijiquan combined	9.300	1	9.353	1	18.653	1 Q	9.353	1	9.360	1	18.713	1st place, gold medalist(s)
