= Belize at the 2026 Summer Youth Olympics =

- IOC code: BIZ
- NOC: Belize Olympic and Commonwealth Games Association

in Dakar, Senegal 31 October – 13 November 2026
- Competitors: 2 in 1 sport
- Flag bearers: Jaaden Williams & Melody Gabourel
- Medals: Gold 0 Silver 0 Bronze 0 Total 0

Summer Youth Olympics appearances
- 2010; 2014; 2018; 2026

Belize is scheduled to compete at the 2026 Summer Youth Olympics in Dakar, Senegal from 31 October to 13 November 2026. This will mark Belize's fourth appearance at the Youth Olympics, after making its debut in 2010.

The Belize team consists of two athletes selected by the Belize Athletic Association (BAA) competing in athletics. The delegation is led by Chef de Mission Herman Pastor Jr.

Athletes Jaaden Williams and Melody Gabourel served as the flag bearers for the opening ceremony.

== Competitors ==
The following is the list of number of competitors participating at the Games per sport/discipline.

Sport	Men	Women	Total
Athletics	1	1	2
Total	1	1	2

== Athletics ==
=== Field events ===
Men

Athlete	Event	Qualification		Final	
Athlete	Event	Distance	Position	Distance	Position
Jaaden Williams	Triple jump				

Women

Athlete	Event	Qualification		Final	
Athlete	Event	Distance	Position	Distance	Position
Melody Gabourel	Shot put				

== See also ==
- Belize at the 2026 Commonwealth Games
