= Qatar at the 2026 Summer Youth Olympics =

- Flag of Qatar
- IOC code: QAT
- NOC: Qatar Olympic Committee
- Website: www.olympic.qa

in Dakar, Senegal October 31, 2026 – November 13, 2026
- Competitors: 4 in 3 sports
- Flag bearer: Adam Morsy
- Medals: Gold 0 Silver 0 Bronze 0 Total 0

Summer Youth Olympics appearances
- 2010; 2014; 2018; 2026

Qatar is scheduled to compete at the 2026 Summer Youth Olympics in Dakar, Senegal from October 31 to November 13, 2026. This will mark Qatar's fourth appearance at the Youth Olympics, after making its debut in 2010.

Swimmer Adam Morsy served as the flag bearer for the opening ceremony.

== Competitors ==
The following is the list of number of competitors participating at the Games per sport/discipline.

Sport	Men	Women	Total
Athletics	1	1	2
Fencing	1	0	1
Swimming	1	0	1
Total	3	1	4

== Athletics ==
Qatar entered two athletes, one of each gender.

=== Track & road events ===
Men

Athlete	Event	Heat		Semifinal		Final	
Athlete	Event	Result	Rank	Result	Rank	Result	Rank
Aboubakar Idriss	110 m hurdles						

Women

Athlete	Event	Heat		Semifinal		Final	
Athlete	Event	Result	Rank	Result	Rank	Result	Rank
Dana Salem	200 m						

== Fencing ==
Qatar entered one male athlete.

Athlete	Event	Round of 64	Round of 32	Round of 16	Quarterfinal	Semifinal	Final / BM	
Athlete	Event	Opposition Score	Opposition Score	Opposition Score	Opposition Score	Opposition Score	Opposition Score	Rank
Adham Eldeeb	Men's foil							

== Swimming ==
Qatar entered one male swimmer.

Athlete	Event	Heat		Semifinal		Final	
Athlete	Event	Time	Rank	Time	Rank	Time	Rank
Adam Morsy	50 m breaststroke						
Adam Morsy	100 m breaststroke						
Adam Morsy	200 m breaststroke	2:17.75	4 Q	N/A	N/A	2:17.07	5
