= Antigua and Barbuda at the 2026 Summer Youth Olympics =

- Flag of Antigua and Barbuda
- IOC code: ANT
- NOC: The Antigua and Barbuda Olympic Association
- Website: antiguaolympiccommittee.com

in Dakar, Senegal October 31, 2026 – November 13, 2026
- Competitors: 5 in 3 sports
- Flag bearers: Tyra Fenton & Espriit Alessio Shaw
- Medals: Gold 0 Silver 0 Bronze 0 Total 0

Summer Youth Olympics appearances
- 2010; 2014; 2018; 2026

Antigua and Barbuda is scheduled to compete at the 2026 Summer Youth Olympics in Dakar, Senegal from October 31 to November 13, 2026. This will mark Antigua and Barbuda's fourth appearance at the Youth Olympics, after making its debut in 2010.

Athlete Tyra Fenton and swimmer Espriit Alessio Shaw served as the flag bearers for the opening ceremony.

== Competitors ==
The following is the list of number of competitors participating at the Games per sport/discipline.

Sport	Men	Women	Total
Athletics	1	1	2
Swimming	1	1	2
Table tennis	0	1	2
Total	2	3	5

== Athletics ==
Antigua and Barbuda entered two female athletes.

=== Track & road events ===
Girls

Athlete	Event	Heat		Semifinal		Final	
Athlete	Event	Result	Rank	Result	Rank	Result	Rank
Tyra Fenton	200 m						

=== Field events ===
Girls

Athlete	Event	Qualification		Final	
Athlete	Event	Distance	Position	Distance	Position
Zonique Charles	Javelin throw				
Naftaly Magalhaes	High jump				
Pyetro Souza	Shot put				

== Swimming ==
Antigua and Barbuda entered two swimmers, one male and one female.

Athlete	Event	Heat		Semifinal		Final	
Athlete	Event	Time	Rank	Time	Rank	Time	Rank
Espriit Alessio Shaw	50 m breaststroke						
Espriit Alessio Shaw	100 m breaststroke						
Espriit Alessio Shaw	50 m butterfly						
Espriit Alessio Shaw	100 m butterfly						
Keziah Joseph	50 m freestyle						
Keziah Joseph	100 m freestyle						
Keziah Joseph	200 m freestyle						
Keziah Joseph	50 m butterfly						

== Table tennis ==
Antigua and Bermuda entered one female athlete.

Athlete	Event	Preliminary	Round of 16	Quarterfinals	Semifinals	Final / BM				
Athlete	Event	Opposition Result	Opposition Result	Opposition Result	Opposition Result	Opposition Result	Opposition Result	Opposition Result	Opposition Result	Rank
Stuti Kashyap	Womens' singles									
