= Wushu at the 2026 Summer Youth Olympics – Women's taijiquan combined =

Women's taijiquan combined at the 2026 Summer Youth Olympics
- Venue: Dakar Expo Center
- Dates: 1–3 November
- Competitors: 11 from 11 nations

Medalists
gold medal	Ng Zhe Nin	Singapore
silver medal	Chu Yu En	Chinese Taipei
bronze medal	Mia Aurelja Xianglin Zhuo	Germany

The women's taijiquan combined event at the 2026 Summer Youth Olympics will take place from 1 to 3 November at the Dakar Expo Center in Dakar, Senegal.

== Results ==
=== Preliminary round ===
The preliminary round determined the top eight competitors who advanced to the final stage based on their combined scores from the taijishan and taijiquan routines.

Rank	Athlete	Nationality	Taijishan		Taijiquan		Total	Notes
Rank	Athlete	Nationality	Score	Rank	Score	Rank	Total	Notes
1	Ng Zhe Nin	Singapore	9.300	1	9.353	1	18.653	Q
2	Chu Yu En	Chinese Taipei	9.233	2	9.330	2	18.563	Q
3	Angel Polo	Philippines	9.223	3	9.233	3	18.456	Q
4	Mia Aurelja Xianglin Zhuo	Germany	9.160	5	9.200	4	18.360	Q
5	Miranda Wei	Canada	9.173	4	9.186	6	18.359	Q
6	Gulirano Kholmuminova	Uzbekistan	9.056	6	9.200	5	18.256	Q
7	Lauren Emily Yu Qing Chua	Brunei	8.973	7	9.170	7	18.143	Q
8	Zeineb Manai	Tunisia	8.973	8	8.910	8	17.883	Q
9	Kalina Slavcheva	Bulgaria	8.430	9	7.956	10	16.386	
10	Nelcy Houefa Kelia Noudofinin	Benin	7.933	11	8.256	9	16.189	
11	Woreye Ndiaye	Senegal	8.343	10	DNS	–	8.343	

=== Final ===
The final round featured the top eight qualifying athletes competing for the medals in the combined taijiquan and taijishan routines.

Rank	Athlete	Nationality	Taijishan		Taijiquan		Total
Rank	Athlete	Nationality	Score	Rank	Score	Rank	Total
1st place, gold medalist(s)	Ng Zhe Nin	Singapore	9.353	1	9.360	1	18.713
2nd place, silver medalist(s)	Chu Yu En	Chinese Taipei	9.166	3	9.333	2	18.499
3rd place, bronze medalist(s)	Mia Aurelja Xianglin Zhuo	Germany	9.266	2	9.216	4	18.482
4	Gulirano Kholmuminova	Uzbekistan	9.120	4	9.240	3	18.360
5	Angel Polo	Philippines	9.026	6	9.250	2	18.276
6	Miranda Wei	Canada	9.093	5	9.053	6	18.146
7	Lauren Emily Yu Qing Chua	Brunei	8.980	7	9.013	5	17.993
8	Zeineb Manai	Tunisia	9.003	8	8.530	8	17.533
