= Ivory Coast at the 2026 Summer Youth Olympics =

- Flag of Ivory Coast
- IOC code: CIV
- NOC: Comité National Olympique de Côte d'Ivoire

in Dakar, Senegal October 31, 2026 – November 13, 2026
- Competitors: 12 in 7 sports
- Flag bearers: Bosson Niamien & Ismael Issouf
- Medals: Gold 0 Silver 0 Bronze 0 Total 0

Summer Youth Olympics appearances
- 2010; 2014; 2018; 2026

Ivory Coast is scheduled to compete at the 2026 Summer Youth Olympics in Dakar, Senegal from October 31 to November 13, 2026. This will mark Ivory Coast's fourth appearance at the Youth Olympics, after making its debut in 2010.

Athlete Bosson Niamien and 3x3 basketball player Ismael Issouf served as the flag bearers for the opening ceremony.

== Competitors ==
The following is the list of number of competitors participating at the Games per sport/discipline.

Sport	Men	Women	Total
3x3 basketball	4	0	4
Archery	1	1	2
Athletics	1	1	2
Beach wrestling	1	0	1
Fencing	0	1	1
Swimming	0	1	1
Taekwondo	0	1	1
Total	7	5	12

== 3x3 basketball ==
Ivory Coast entered a team for the boys' tournament as one of the three participating teams from Africa.

Summary

Event	Pool play			Quarterfinal	Semifinal	Final / BM	
Event	Opposition Score	Opposition Score	Group Rank	Opposition Score	Opposition Score	Opposition Score	Rank
Men's tournament	Solomon Islands	Germany					

Roster

- Owo Adja
- Ismael Issouf
- Gabin Namoanoquinten
- Elbachir Sybi

== Archery ==
Ivory Coast entered two archers, one of each gender.

Athlete	Event	Ranking Round		Round of 16	Quarterfinals	Semifinals	Final / BM	Rank
Athlete	Event	Score	Seed	Opposition Score	Opposition Score	Opposition Score	Opposition Score	Rank
Kouassi Yao	Men's individual							
Sita Sore	Women's individual							
Kouassi Yao; Sita Sore	Mixed team							

== Athletics ==
Ivory Coast entered two athletes, one of each gender.

=== Track & road events ===
Men

Athlete	Event	Semifinal		Final	
Athlete	Event	Result	Rank	Result	Rank
Silvestre Yapo	200 m				

Women

Athlete	Event	Semifinal		Final	
Athlete	Event	Result	Rank	Result	Rank
Bousson Niamen	100 m				

== Beach wrestling ==
Ivory Coast entered one male athlete.

Men

Team	Event	Group stage				Semifinals	Final / BM	
Team	Event	Opposition Result	Opposition Result	Opposition Result	Rank	Opposition Result	Opposition Result	Rank
Namon Coulibaly	–60 kg							

== Fencing ==
Ivory Coast entered one female athlete.

Athlete	Event	Round of 64	Round of 32	Round of 16	Quarterfinal	Semifinal	Final / BM	
Athlete	Event	Opposition Score	Opposition Score	Opposition Score	Opposition Score	Opposition Score	Opposition Score	Rank
Marie Kouassi	Women's epée							

== Swimming ==
Ivory Coast entered one female swimmer.

Athlete	Event	Heat		Final	
Athlete	Event	Time	Rank	Time	Rank
Malika Camara	400 m freestyle				
Malika Camara	800 m freestyle				
Malika Camara	100 m backstroke				
Malika Camara	200 m individual medley				

== Taekwondo ==
Ivory Coast entered one female athlete.

Women

Athlete	Event	Round of 16	Quarterfinals	Semifinals	Repechage	Final / BM	
Athlete	Event	Opposition Result	Opposition Result	Opposition Result	Opposition Result	Opposition Result	Rank
Marthe Nouefe	+63 kg	Bye					
