= Jamaica at the 2026 Summer Youth Olympics =

- Flag of Jamaica
- IOC code: JAM
- NOC: Jamaica Olympic Association

in Dakar, Senegal October 31, 2026 – November 13, 2026
- Competitors: 11 in 4 sports
- Flag bearers: Skyelar Richards & Larone Gow
- Medals: Gold 0 Silver 0 Bronze 0 Total 0

Summer Youth Olympics appearances
- 2010; 2014; 2018; 2026

Jamaica is scheduled to compete at the 2026 Summer Youth Olympics in Dakar, Senegal from October 31 to November 13, 2026. This will mark Jamaica's fourth appearance at the Youth Olympics, after making its debut in 2010.

Swimmer Skyelar Richards and judoka Larone Gow served as the flag bearers for the opening ceremony.

== Competitors ==
The following is the list of number of competitors participating at the Games per sport/discipline.

Sport	Men	Women	Total
Artistic gymnastics	0	1	1
Athletics	4	3	7
Judo	1	0	1
Swimming	1	1	2
Total	6	5	11

== Artistic gymnastics ==
Jamaica entered one female gymnast.

Girls

Athlete	Event	Qualification						Final					
Athlete	Event	Apparatus				Total	Rank	Apparatus				Total	Rank
Athlete	Event	V	UB	BB	F	Total	Rank	V	UB	BB	F	Total	Rank
Mariah Gordon	All-around	11.833	7.100	9.533	8.633	37.099	51	did not qualify					

== Athletics ==
Jamaica entered seven athletes, four male and three female.

=== Track & road events ===
Men

Athlete	Event	Heat		Semifinal		Final	
Athlete	Event	Result	Rank	Result	Rank	Result	Rank
Marquies Page	110 m hurdles						
Jaeden Campbell	400 m hurdles						

Women

Athlete	Event	Heat		Semifinal		Final	
Athlete	Event	Result	Rank	Result	Rank	Result	Rank
Sheneca Harris	400 m hurdles						

=== Field events ===
Men

Athlete	Event	Qualification		Final	
Athlete	Event	Distance	Position	Distance	Position
Xhaevion Kelly	Shot put				
Kamari Kennedy	Discus throw				

Women

Athlete	Event	Qualification		Final	
Athlete	Event	Distance	Position	Distance	Position
Zavien Bernard	Triple jump				
Malia Housen	High jump				

== Judo ==
Jamaica entered one male judoka based on the available quotas assigned by the International Judo Federation.

Men

Athlete	Event	Round of 16	Quarterfinals	Semifinals	Repechage	Final / BM	
Athlete	Event	Opposition Result	Opposition Result	Opposition Result	Opposition Result	Opposition Result	Rank
Larone Gow	-66 kg						

== Swimming ==
Jamaica entered two swimmers, one male and one female.

Athlete	Event	Heat		Semifinal		Final	
Athlete	Event	Time	Rank	Time	Rank	Time	Rank
Matthew Kennedy	50 m freestyle						
Matthew Kennedy	100 m freestyle						
Matthew Kennedy	200 m freestyle						
Matthew Kennedy	200 m butterlfy						
Skyelar Richards	50 m freestyle						
Skyelar Richards	100 m freestyle						
Skyelar Richards	50 m butterfly						
Skyelar Richards	50 m backstroke						
