= Guyana at the 2026 Summer Youth Olympics =

- Flag of Guyana
- IOC code: GUY
- NOC: Guyana Olympic Association

in Dakar, Senegal October 31, 2026 – November 13, 2026
- Competitors: 2 in 2 sports
- Flag bearer: Deuquan Farrell
- Medals: Gold 0 Silver 1 Bronze 0 Total 1

Summer Youth Olympics appearances
- 2010; 2014; 2018; 2026

Guyana is scheduled to compete at the 2026 Summer Youth Olympics in Dakar, Senegal from October 31 to November 13, 2026. This will mark Guyana's fourth appearance at the Youth Olympics, after making its debut in 2010.

Athlete Deuquan Farrell served as the flag bearer for the opening ceremony.

== Competitors ==
The following is the list of number of competitors participating at the Games per sport/discipline.

Sport	Men	Women	Total
Athletics	1	0	1
Swimming	1	0	1
Total	2	0	2

== Athletics ==
Guyana entered one male athlete.

=== Track & road events ===
Men

Athlete	Event	Heat		Semifinal		Final	
Athlete	Event	Result	Rank	Result	Rank	Result	Rank
Deuquan Farrell	200 m						

== Swimming ==
Guyana entered one male swimmer.

Athlete	Event	Heat		Semifinal		Final	
Athlete	Event	Time	Rank	Time	Rank	Time	Rank
Erik Gonsalves	100 m freestyle						
Erik Gonsalves	50 m butterfly						
Erik Gonsalves	100 m butterfly						
