= Virgin Islands at the 2026 Summer Youth Olympics =

- Flag of Virgin Islands
- IOC code: ISV
- NOC: Virgin Islands Olympic Committee

in Dakar, Senegal October 31, 2026 – November 13, 2026
- Competitors: 4 in 2 sports
- Flag bearers: Reagan Uszenski & Juvante Hurst
- Medals: Gold 0 Silver 0 Bronze 0 Total 0

Summer Youth Olympics appearances
- 2010; 2014; 2018; 2026

US Virgin Islands is scheduled to compete at the 2026 Summer Youth Olympics in Dakar, Senegal from October 31 to November 13, 2026. This will mark US Virgin Islands's fourth appearance at the Youth Olympics, after making its debut in 2010.

Swimmer Reagan Uszenski and athlete Juvante Hurst served as the flag bearers for the opening ceremony.

== Competitors ==
The following is the list of number of competitors participating at the Games per sport/discipline.

Sport	Men	Women	Total
Athletics	1	1	2
Swimming	1	1	2
Total	2	2	4

== Athletics ==
US Virgin Islands entered two athletes, one male and one female.

=== Track & road events ===
Men

Athlete	Event	Heat		Semifinal		Final	
Athlete	Event	Result	Rank	Result	Rank	Result	Rank
Juvante Hurst	800 m						

Women

Athlete	Event	Heat		Semifinal		Final	
Athlete	Event	Result	Rank	Result	Rank	Result	Rank
Safiya Prasad	400 m hurdles						

== Swimming ==
US Virgin Islands entered two swimmers, one male and one female.

Athlete	Event	Heat		Semifinal		Final	
Athlete	Event	Time	Rank	Time	Rank	Time	Rank
Zion John Baptiste	50 m freestyle						
Zion John Baptiste	100 m freestyle	59.08	63	N/A	N/A	did not advance	did not advance
Zion John Baptiste	50 m backstroke						
Zion John Baptiste	100 m backstroke						
Reagan Uszenski	50 m freestyle						
Reagan Uszenski	100 m freestyle	59.31	14	N/A	N/A	did not advance	did not advance
Reagan Uszenski	200 m freestyle						
Reagan Uszenski	50 m backstroke						
