= Chad at the 2026 Summer Youth Olympics =

- IOC code: CHA
- NOC: Comité Olympique et Sportif Tchadien

in Dakar, Senegal 31 October – 13 November 2026
- Competitors: 2 in 1 sport
- Flag bearers: Lucienne Djiallate & Kebzabo Banssoubo
- Medals: Gold 0 Silver 0 Bronze 0 Total 0

Summer Youth Olympics appearances
- 2010; 2014; 2018; 2026

Chad is scheduled to compete at the 2026 Summer Youth Olympics in Dakar, Senegal from 31 October to 13 November 2026. This will mark Chad's fourth appearance at the Youth Olympics, after making its debut in 2010.

The Chadian team consisted of two track and field athletes, one of each gender. Athletes Lucienne Djiallate and Kebzabo Banssoubo served as the flag bearers for the opening ceremony.

== Competitors ==
The following is the list of number of competitors participating at the Games.

Sport	Men	Women	Total
Athletics	1	1	2
Total	1	1	2

== Athletics ==
Chad entered two athletes, one of each gender.

=== Track & road events ===
Men

Athlete	Event	Heat		Semifinal		Final	
Athlete	Event	Result	Rank	Result	Rank	Result	Rank
Kebzabo Kebzabo	800 m						

Women

Athlete	Event	Heat		Semifinal		Final	
Athlete	Event	Result	Rank	Result	Rank	Result	Rank
Lucienne Djiallate	400 m						
