= Timor-Leste at the 2026 Summer Youth Olympics =

- Flag of Timor-Leste
- IOC code: TLS
- NOC: National Olympic Committee of East Timor

in Dakar, Senegal October 31, 2026 – November 13, 2026
- Competitors: 3 in 2 sports
- Flag bearers: Selena Marlin & Castro Amaral
- Medals: Gold 0 Silver 0 Bronze 0 Total 0

Summer Youth Olympics appearances
- 2010; 2014; 2018; 2026

Timor-Leste is scheduled to compete at the 2026 Summer Youth Olympics in Dakar, Senegal from October 31 to November 13, 2026. This will mark Timor-Leste's fourth appearance at the Youth Olympics, after making its debut in 2010.

Swimmer Selena Marlin and athlete Castro Amaral served as the flag bearers for the opening ceremony.

== Competitors ==
The following is the list of number of competitors participating at the Games per sport/discipline.

Sport	Men	Women	Total
Athletics	1	0	1
Swimming	1	1	2
Total	2	1	3

== Athletics ==
Timor-Leste entered one male athlete.

=== Track & road events ===
Men

Athlete	Event	Heat		Semifinal		Final	
Athlete	Event	Result	Rank	Result	Rank	Result	Rank
Castro Amaral	800 m						

== Swimming ==
Timor-Leste entered two swimmers, one male and one female.

Athlete	Event	Heat		Semifinal		Final	
Athlete	Event	Time	Rank	Time	Rank	Time	Rank
Deonisio Álves	50 m freestyle						
Deonisio Álves	50 m butterfly						
Salena Marlin	50 m freestyle						
