= Swimming at the 2026 Summer Youth Olympics – Men's 200 metre freestyle =

Men's 200 metre freestyle at the 2026 Summer Youth Olympics
- Venue: Complexe Tour de l'Oeuf
- Dates: 6 November
- Competitors: 43 from 43 nations
- Winning time: 1:47.78

Medalists
gold medal	Bogdan Toropkin	Russia
silver medal	Olivér Pápai	Hungary
bronze medal	Daniel Saborío	Mexico

The men's 200 metre freestyle event at the 2026 Summer Youth Olympics took place on 6 November at the Complexe Tour de l'Oeuf in Dakar, Senegal.

== Results ==
=== Heats ===
The heats were started at 10:21.

Rank	Heat	Lane	Name	Nationality	Time	Notes
1	6	4	Bogdan Toropkin	Russia	1:50.94	Q
2	5	4	Olivér Pápai	Hungary	1:51.20	Q
3	5	5	Ariel Muchirahondo	New Zealand	1:51.41	Q
4	4	4	Daniel Saborío	Mexico	1:52.49	Q
5	5	3	Adanuriel Rosal	Venezuela	1:52.59	Q
6	6	5	Luca Marinescu	Romania	1:52.65	Q
7	6	3	Suleyman Ismayilzada	Azerbaijan	1:53.14	Q
8	4	2	Domenico Sotomayor	Peru	1:53.17	Q
9	5	1	Lee Ji-hoo	South Korea	1:53.21	
10	4	3	Matthew Goller	South Africa	1:53.35	
11	6	6	Gerd Johan Lessing	Estonia	1:53.44	
12	6	7	Supphakorn Jaikla	Thailand	1:53.94	
13	4	5	Lee Han	Chinese Taipei	1:54.01	
14	6	2	Thiago Pizzini	Argentina	1:54.81	
15	4	6	Matiáš Krištof	Slovakia	1:54.85	
15	5	7	Dimitar Dokuzov	Bulgaria	1:54.85	
17	3	5	Fabian Janiszewski	Poland	1:55.23	
18	1	4	Alexander Van Hoey Billiet	Belgium	1:55.46	
19	5	2	Lau Chor Tik	Hong Kong	1:56.29	
20	2	3	Filippo Aloisi	Italy	1:56.74	
21	4	8	Tarek Bluck	Sri Lanka	1:56.94	
22	3	4	Chirill Certicovtev	Moldova	1:57.95	
23	3	6	Andrés Rojas	Costa Rica	1:58.05	
24	3	2	Nejc Kranjc	Slovenia	1:58.33	
25	3	1	Josué Matute	Honduras	1:58.71	
26	4	7	Loo Cheng Feng	Malaysia	1:58.72	
27	4	1	Youssef Douma	Tunisia	1:59.21	
28	2	7	Humoud Al-Humoud	Kuwait	1:59.35	
29	6	8	Mulenga Cole	Zambia	1:59.98	
30	2	8	Connor Grist	Zimbabwe	2:00.52	
31	2	2	Mohammed Zayed	Palestine	2:01.44	
32	6	1	Reynard Delian Purwanto	Indonesia	2:02.25	
33	2	6	Benjamín Insfrán	Paraguay	2:03.25	
34	3	3	Giovanni Krismer	Austria	2:03.35	
35	2	5	Ocean Campus	Guam	2:03.99	
36	2	1	Dachi Meskhishvili	Georgia	2:04.05	
37	1	5	Mark Mwase	Uganda	2:05.39	
38	3	8	Michael El Werr	Jordan	2:05.50	
39	2	4	Santiago Guimarães	Angola	2:06.18	
40	1	6	Yousef El-Walid	Libya	2:06.63	
41	1	2	Sheja Murenzi	Rwanda	2:12.37	
42	1	3	Zack Okumu	Tanzania	2:12.52	
	5	6	Rami Al-Rahmouni	Saudi Arabia	Disqualified	
	3	7	Ian Alonso	Puerto Rico	Did not start	
	5	8	Matthew Kennedy	Jamaica	Did not start	

=== Final ===
The final was held at 15:34.

Rank	Lane	Name	Nationality	Time	Notes
1st place, gold medalist(s)	4	Bogdan Toropkin	Russia	1:47.78	
2nd place, silver medalist(s)	5	Olivér Pápai	Hungary	1:48.43	
3rd place, bronze medalist(s)	6	Daniel Saborío	Mexico	1:49.68	
4	3	Ariel Muchirahondo	New Zealand	1:50.98	
5	2	Adanuriel Rosal	Venezuela	1:51.18	
6	8	Domenico Sotomayor	Peru	1:52.80	
7	7	Luca Marinescu	Romania	1:53.42	
8	1	Suleyman Ismayilzada	Azerbaijan	1:53.72	
