= 3x3 basketball at the 2026 Summer Youth Olympics =

3x3 Basketball at the IV Summer Youth Olympic Games
- Venue: Tour de l'Oeuf Complex
- Dates: 6–9 November
- No. of events: 2 (1 boys, 1 girls)
- Competitors: 96 (48 boys, 48 girls) from 23 nations
- Teams: 24

3x3 basketball at the 2026 Summer Youth Olympics was held from 6 to 9 November. The events took place at the Tour de l'Oeuf Complex in Dakar, Senegal. Following the previous edition, the dunk contest as well as the shoot-out Contest were discontinued.

== Qualification ==
On 24 April 2026, the FIBA announced that the following Nations would participate:

Region	Men	Women
Africa	Senegal	
Africa	Algeria	Egypt
Africa	Ivory Coast	Kenya
Americas	Argentina	Chile
Americas	Puerto Rico	Mexico
Americas	Venezuela	—N/a
Europe	Germany	Czech Republic
Europe	Latvia	France
Europe	Lithuania	~~Italy~~
Europe	—N/a	~~Netherlands~~
Europe	—N/a	Poland
Europe	—N/a	Ukraine
Asia-Pacific	Mongolia	China
Asia-Pacific	Singapore	Chinese Taipei
Asia-Pacific	Solomon Islands	Fiji

When the seeding list for the competition was, the Netherlands and Italy had been replaced by Ukraine and Poland for unknown reasons.

Pos.	Men	Women
1	Germany	China
2	Mongolia	Chile
3	Latvia	Czech Republic
4	Algeria	France
5	Lithuania	Poland
6	Singapore	Ukraine
7	Argentina	Mexico
8	Solomon Islands	Kenya
9	Ivory Coast	Fiji
10	Venezuela	Chinese Taipei
11	Puerto Rico	Egypt
12	Senegal	Senegal

== Medal summary ==
=== Medal table ===
* Host nation (Senegal)

Rank	Nation	Gold	Silver	Bronze	Total
1	Senegal*	1	0	1	2
2	Poland	1	0	0	1
3	China	0	1	0	1
3	Lithuania	0	1	0	1
5	Germany	0	0	1	1
Totals (5 entries)		2	2	2	6

=== Events ===
Event	Gold	Silver	Bronze
Men	Senegal; Frédéric Clovice Mané; Ibrahima Ndiaye; Papa Mamadou Cissé; Sacoura Diop	Lithuania; Paulius Veliulis; Matas Rupšlaukis; Mantas Želvys; Emilis Alishan Adnan	Germany; Rodney Agyeman; Elias Koeppen; Philip Grothe; Béla Doleviczenyi
Women	Poland; Nicola Brzeska; Stefania Onuorah; Lena Olejniczak; Gabriela Stefanowicz	China; Tang Yihan; Sun Hanyun; Zhu Zihan; Gu Manjie	Senegal; Fatou Diop; Bintou Bangoura; Fatou Ndiaye; Néné Sira Diallo
