= Chile at the 2026 Summer Youth Olympics =

- Flag of Chile
- IOC code: CHI
- NOC: Chilean Olympic Committee
- Website: www.coch.cl

in Dakar, Senegal October 31, 2026 – November 13, 2026
- Competitors: 18 in 8 sports
- Flag bearers: Laura Fingerhuth & Gael Arias
- Medals: Gold 0 Silver 0 Bronze 1 Total 1

Summer Youth Olympics appearances
- 2010; 2014; 2018; 2026

Chile is scheduled to compete at the 2026 Summer Youth Olympics in Dakar, Senegal from October 31 to November 13, 2026. This will mark Chile's fourth appearance at the Youth Olympics, after making its debut in 2010.

Swimmer Laura Fingerhuth and beach volleyball player Gael Arias will serve as the flag bearers for the opening ceremony.

== Competitors ==
The following is the list of number of competitors participating at the Games per sport/discipline.

Sport	Men	Women	Total
Athletics	1	2	3
3x3 basketball	0	4	4
Beach volleyball	2	0	2
Equestrian	0	1	1
Fencing	0	1	1
Road cycling	0	1	1
Skateboarding	0	1	1
Swimming	1	1	2
Table tennis	0	1	1
Triathlon	1	0	1
Wushu	1	0	1
Total	6	12	18

== 3x3 basketball ==
Chile entered a team for the women's tournament as one of the two participating teams from the Americas.

Summary

Event	Pool play			Quarterfinal	Semifinal	Final / BM	
Event	Opposition Score	Opposition Score	Group Rank	Opposition Score	Opposition Score	Opposition Score	Rank
Women's tournament							

Roster

- Daimy Balve
- Isidora Cornejo
- Constanza Mella
- Victoria Sarce

== Athletics ==
Chile entered three athletes, one male and two female.

=== Track & road events ===
Women

Athlete	Event	Heat		Semifinal		Final	
Athlete	Event	Result	Rank	Result	Rank	Result	Rank
Roxana Ramírez	100 m						
Valentina Cancino	800 m						

=== Field events ===
Men

Athlete	Event	Qualification		Final	
Athlete	Event	Distance	Position	Distance	Position
Vittorio Gorziglia	Discus throw				

== Beach volleyball ==
Chile received a quota place for the men's tournament.

Summary

Team	Event	Group stage				Round of 16	Quarterfinals	Semifinals	Final / PG / BM	
Team	Event	Opposition Result	Opposition Result	Opposition Result	Rank	Opposition Result	Opposition Result	Opposition Result	Opposition Result	Rank
Gael Arias; Francisco Farías	Men's tournament									

== Equestrian ==
Chile entered one female athlete.

Athlete	Horse	Event	Qualification		Final			Jump-Off		
Athlete	Horse	Event	Penalties	Rank	Penalties	Time	Rank	Penalties	Time	Rank
Bruna de Rossetti		Individual jumping								

== Fencing ==
Chile entered one female athlete.

Athlete	Event	Round of 64	Round of 32	Round of 16	Quarterfinal	Semifinal	Final / BM	
Athlete	Event	Opposition Score	Opposition Score	Opposition Score	Opposition Score	Opposition Score	Opposition Score	Rank
Sofía Bossay	Women's sabre							

== Road cycling ==
Chile entered one female athlete.

Women

Athlete	Event	Time	Rank
Ana Fierro	Road race		
Ana Fierro	Time trial		

== Skateboarding ==
Chile entered one female athlete based on available quotas.

Athlete	Event	Semifinal		Final	
Athlete	Event	Result	Rank	Result	Rank
Julieta Araya	Women's street				

== Swimming ==
Chile entered two swimmers, one male and one female.

Athlete	Event	Heat		Semifinal		Final	
Athlete	Event	Time	Rank	Time	Rank	Time	Rank
Joaquín Gálvez	50 m breaststroke						
Joaquín Gálvez	100 m breaststroke						
Laura Fingerhuth	50 m breaststroke						
Laura Fingerhuth	100 m breaststroke						

== Table tennis ==
Chile entered one female athlete.

Athlete	Event	Preliminary	Round 1	Round 2	Round 3	Round of 16	Quarterfinals	Semifinals	Final / BM	
Athlete	Event	Opposition Result	Opposition Result	Opposition Result	Opposition Result	Opposition Result	Opposition Result	Opposition Result	Opposition Result	Rank
Catalina Ramírez	Women's singles									

== Triathlon ==
Chile entered one male athlete.

Athlete	Event	Time						Rank
Athlete	Event	Swim (750m)	Trans 1	Bike (20km)	Trans 2	Run (5km)	Total	Rank
Raimundo San Martín	Men's individual							

== Wushu ==
Chile entered one male athlete after quotas were assigned by the International Wushu Federation.

Athlete	Event	Changquan routine		Gunshu routine		Total Points	Final Rank
Athlete	Event	Points	Rank	Points	Rank	Total Points	Final Rank
Renato Silva	Men's changquan combined						
