= Paraguay at the 2026 Summer Youth Olympics =

- Flag of Paraguay
- IOC code: PAR
- NOC: Paraguayan Olympic Committee
- Website: www.cop.org.py

in Dakar, Senegal October 31, 2026 – November 13, 2026
- Competitors: 19 in 8 sports
- Flag bearers: Sofía Martínez & Antonio Acuña
- Medals: Gold 1 Silver 0 Bronze 0 Total 1

Summer Youth Olympics appearances
- 2010; 2014; 2018; 2026

Paraguay is scheduled to compete at the 2026 Summer Youth Olympics in Dakar, Senegal from October 31 to November 13, 2026. This will mark Paraguay's fourth appearance at the Youth Olympics, after making its debut in 2010.

Beach volleyball player Sofía Martínez and futsal player Antonio Acuña served as the flag bearers for the opening ceremony.

== Competitors ==
The following is the list of number of competitors participating at the Games per sport/discipline.

Sport	Men	Women	Total
Athletics	1	0	1
Beach volleyball	0	2	2
Coastal rowing	0	1	1
Fencing	0	1	1
Futsal	10	0	10
Road cycling	0	1	1
Swimming	1	1	2
Taekwondo	0	1	1
Total	12	7	19

== Athletics ==
Paraguay entered one male athlete.

=== Field events ===
Men

Athlete	Event	Final	
Athlete	Event	Distance	Position
Marko Kaethler	Javelin throw	73.49	1st place, gold medalist(s)

== Beach volleyball ==
Paraguay received a quota place for the women's tournament.

Summary

Team	Event	Group stage				Round of 16	Quarterfinals	Semifinals	Final / PG / BM	
Team	Event	Opposition Result	Opposition Result	Opposition Result	Rank	Opposition Result	Opposition Result	Opposition Result	Opposition Result	Rank
María Estefanía Gómez; Sofía Martínez	Women's tournament									

== Coastal rowing ==
Paraguay entered one female rower.

Women

Athlete	Event	Round of 16	Quarterfinals	Semifinals	Final / BM	
Athlete	Event	Opposition Result	Opposition Result	Opposition Result	Opposition Result	Rank
Victoria Giménez	Solo					

== Fencing ==
Paraguay entered one female athlete.

Athlete	Event	Round of 64	Round of 32	Round of 16	Quarterfinal	Semifinal	Final / BM	
Athlete	Event	Opposition Score	Opposition Score	Opposition Score	Opposition Score	Opposition Score	Opposition Score	Rank
Jimena Cabrera	Women's sabre							

== Futsal ==
Paraguay entered a team for the men's tournament.

Summary

Event	Group stage				Semifinal	Final / BM	
Event	Opposition Score	Opposition Score	Opposition Score	Group Rank	Opposition Score	Opposition Score	Rank
Men's tournament	Portugal	Morocco; L 3–6	Solomon Islands; W 9–2				

Roster

- Antonio Acuña
- Agustín Barreto
- Facundo Boderone
- Julio Cáceres
- Octavio Cáceres
- Rafael Krutzmann
- Mauro Mora
- José Morinigo
- Juan Rambo
- Oliver Sandoval

== Road cycling ==
Paraguay entered one female athlete.

Women

Athlete	Event	Time	Rank
María Rosetti	Road race		
María Rosetti	Time trial		

== Swimming ==
Brazil entered two swimmers, one male and one female.

Athlete	Event	Heat		Semifinal		Final	
Athlete	Event	Time	Rank	Time	Rank	Time	Rank
Benjamín Insfran	200 m freestyle						
Benjamín Insfran	400 m freestyle						
Benjamín Insfran	800 m freestyle						
Cristhiane Anasco	50 m backstroke						
Cristhiane Anasco	100 m backstroke						
Cristhiane Anasco	50 m butterfly						

== Taekwondo ==
Paraguay entered one female athlete.

Women

Athlete	Event	Round of 16	Quarterfinals	Semifinals	Repechage	Final / BM	
Athlete	Event	Opposition Result	Opposition Result	Opposition Result	Opposition Result	Opposition Result	Rank
Betania Medina	-49 kg						
