= Nigeria at the 2026 Summer Youth Olympics =

- Flag of Nigeria
- IOC code: NGR
- NOC: Nigeria Olympic Committee
- Website: www.nigerianoc.org

in Dakar, Senegal October 31, 2026 – November 13, 2026
- Competitors: 19 in 6 sports
- Flag bearers: Rosemary Nwankwo & Matthew Kuti
- Medals: Gold 0 Silver 0 Bronze 0 Total 0

Summer Youth Olympics appearances (overview)
- 2010; 2014; 2018; 2026

Nigeria competed at the 2026 Summer Youth Olympics in Dakar, Senegal from October 31 to November 13, 2026. This marked Nigeria's fourth appearance at the Youth Olympics, after making its debut in 2010.

Athlete Rosemary Nwankwo and table tennis player Matthew Kuti served as the flag bearers for the opening ceremony.

== Competitors ==
The following is the list of number of competitors participating at the Games per sport/discipline.

Sport	Men	Women	Total
Athletics	4	5	9
Beach volleyball	0	2	2
Boxing	0	1	1
Road cycling	0	1	1
Swimming	2	2	4
Table tennis	1	1	2
Total	7	12	19

== Athletics ==
Nigeria entered nine athletes, four male and five female.

=== Track & road events ===
Men

Athlete	Event	Semifinal		Final	
Athlete	Event	Result	Rank	Result	Rank
Gift Bright	100 m				
Gift Oghenerunor	400 m hurdles				

Women

Athlete	Event	Semifinal		Final	
Athlete	Event	Result	Rank	Result	Rank
Rosemary Nwankwo	100 m				
Faith Ezechukwu	400 m				
Praise Ugoh	400 m				
Treasure Omosivwe	100 m hurdles				
Rita Ezeh	400 m hurdles				

=== Field events ===
Men

Athlete	Event	Final	
Athlete	Event	Distance	Rank
Obanla Ehuwa	High jump		
Godswill Nkemakolam	Javelin throw		

Women

Athlete	Event	Final	
Athlete	Event	Distance	Rank
Praise Ugoh	Shot put		

== Beach volleyball ==
Nigeria received a quota place for the women's tournament.

Summary

Team	Event	Group stage				Round of 16	Quarterfinals	Semifinals	Final / BM	
Team	Event	Opposition Result	Opposition Result	Opposition Result	Rank	Opposition Result	Opposition Result	Opposition Result	Opposition Result	Rank
Pamela Bawa; Joy Lawrence	Women's tournament									

== Boxing ==
Nigeria entered one female athlete in the −48 kg category.

Women

Athlete	Weight	Round of 16	Quarterfinals	Semifinals	Final	
Athlete	Weight	Opposition Result	Opposition Result	Opposition Result	Opposition Result	Rank
Shikurat Mayowa	–48 kg					

== Road cycling ==
Nigeria entered one female athlete.

Women

Athlete	Event	Time	Rank
Ringnan Danjuma	Road race		
Ringnan Danjuma	Time trial		

== Swimming ==
Nigeria entered four swimmers, two of each gender.

Men

Athlete	Event	Heat		Final	
Athlete	Event	Time	Rank	Time	Rank
Aidan Dumuje-Abili	50 m backstroke				
Aidan Dumuje-Abili	100 m backstroke				
Aidan Dumuje-Abili	50 m butterfly				
Aidan Dumuje-Abili	100 m butterfly				
Kashope Obatoyinbo	50 m freestyle				
Kashope Obatoyinbo	100 m freestyle				

Women

Athlete	Event	Heat		Final	
Athlete	Event	Time	Rank	Time	Rank
Omolola Akinsanmi	100 m freestyle				
Omolola Akinsanmi	200 m freestyle				
Omolola Akinsanmi	50 m butterfly				
Omolola Akinsanmi	100 m butterfly				
Kristabel Oldeide	50 m freestyle				
Kristabel Oldeide	50 m backstroke				

== Table tennis ==
Nigeria entered two athletes (one male and one female).

Athlete	Event	Group stage				Round of 32	Round of 16	Quarterfinal	Semifinal	Final	
Athlete	Event	Opposition Result	Opposition Result	Opposition Result	Rank	Opposition Result	Opposition Result	Opposition Result	Opposition Result	Opposition Result	Rank
Matthew Kuti	Men's singles										
Favour Ojo	Women's singles										
Matthew Kuti; Favour Ojo	Mixed doubles	—N/a									
