= Ecuador at the 2026 Summer Youth Olympics =

- Flag of Ecuador
- IOC code: ECU
- NOC: Ecuadorian National Olympic Committee
- Website: www.coe.org.ec

in Dakar, Senegal October 31, 2026 – November 13, 2026
- Competitors: 15 in 10 sports
- Flag bearers: Elvira Espinosa & Joaquín Beltrán
- Medals: Gold 1 Silver 0 Bronze 0 Total 1

Summer Youth Olympics appearances
- 2010; 2014; 2018; 2026

Ecuador is scheduled to compete at the 2026 Summer Youth Olympics in Dakar, Senegal from October 31 to November 13, 2026. This will mark Ecuador's fourth appearance at the Youth Olympics, after making its debut in 2010.

Swimmer Elvira Espinosa and equestrian Joaquín Beltrán served as the flag bearers for the opening ceremony.

== Competitors ==
The following is the list of number of competitors participating at the Games per sport/discipline.

Sport	Men	Women	Total
Athletics	2	1	3
Artistic gymnastics	1	0	1
Beach volleyball	0	2	2
Beach wrestling	0	1	1
Boxing	1	1	2
Equestrian	1	0	1
Road cycling	0	1	1
Swimming	0	1	1
Table tennis	1	1	2
Triathlon	0	1	1
Total	6	9	15

== Artistic gymnastics ==
Ecuador entered one male gymnast.

Men

Athlete	Event	Final									
Athlete	Event	Apparatus								Total	Rank
Athlete	Event	F	PH	R	V			PB	HB	Total	Rank
Athlete	Event	F	PH	R	1	2	Average	PB	HB	Total	Rank
Domenick Godoy	All-around										

== Athletics ==
Ecuador entered three athletes, two male and one female.

=== Track & road events ===
Men

Athlete	Event	Heat		Semifinal		Final	
Athlete	Event	Result	Rank	Result	Rank	Result	Rank
Michael Azogue	800 m						

=== Field events ===
Men

Athlete	Event	Qualification		Final	
Athlete	Event	Distance	Position	Distance	Position
Patry Váldez	Hammer throw				

Women

Athlete	Event	Qualification		Final	
Athlete	Event	Distance	Position	Distance	Position
Rebeca Pata	High jump				

== Beach volleyball ==
Ecuador received a quota place for the women's tournament.

Summary

Team	Event	Group stage				Round of 16	Quarterfinals	Semifinals	Final / PG / BM	
Team	Event	Opposition Result	Opposition Result	Opposition Result	Rank	Opposition Result	Opposition Result	Opposition Result	Opposition Result	Rank
Isabella Habze; Katherine Parraga	Women's tournament									

== Beach wrestling ==
Ecuador entered one male athlete.

Women

Athlete	Weight	Round of 16	Quarterfinals	Semifinals	Final / BM	
Athlete	Weight	Opposition Result	Opposition Result	Opposition Result	Opposition Result	Rank
Xiomara Meza	-55 kg					

== Boxing ==
Ecuador entered two athletes, one male and one female, in the -70 kg and -57 kg categories respectively.

Men

Athlete	Weight	Round of 16	Quarterfinals	Semifinals	Final / BM	
Athlete	Weight	Opposition Result	Opposition Result	Opposition Result	Opposition Result	Rank
Jeremi Soriano	-70 kg					

Women

Athlete	Weight	Round of 16	Quarterfinals	Semifinals	Final / BM	
Athlete	Weight	Opposition Result	Opposition Result	Opposition Result	Opposition Result	Rank
Melissa Carrión	-57 kg					

== Equestrian ==
Ecuador received a quota place as one of the four invited NOCs from South America.

Athlete	Horse	Event	Qualification		Final			Jump-Off		
Athlete	Horse	Event	Penalties	Rank	Penalties	Time	Rank	Penalties	Time	Rank
Joaquín Beltrán		Individual jumping								

== Road cycling ==
Ecuador entered one female athlete.

Women

Athlete	Event	Time	Rank
Nahomi Jativa	Road race		
Nahomi Jativa	Time trial		

== Swimming ==
Ecuador entered one female swimmer.

Athlete	Event	Heat		Semifinal		Final	
Athlete	Event	Time	Rank	Time	Rank	Time	Rank
Elvira Espinosa	200 m freestyle						
Elvira Espinosa	800 m freestyle						
Elvira Espinosa	200 m butterfly						

== Table tennis ==
Ecuador entered two athletes (one male and one female).

Athlete	Event	Preliminary	Round 1	Round 2	Round 3	Round of 16	Quarterfinals	Semifinals	Final / BM	
Athlete	Event	Opposition Result	Opposition Result	Opposition Result	Opposition Result	Opposition Result	Opposition Result	Opposition Result	Opposition Result	Rank
Boris Villavicencio	Men's singles									
Karolayn Maldonado	Women's singles									
Boris Villavicencio; Karolayn Maldonado	Mixed doubles									

== Triathlon ==
Ecuador entered one female athlete.

Athlete	Event	Time						Rank
Athlete	Event	Swim (750m)	Trans 1	Bike (20km)	Trans 2	Run (5km)	Total	Rank
Manuela Ortega	Women's individual							
