= Eritrea at the 2026 Summer Youth Olympics =

- Flag of Eritrea
- IOC code: ERI
- NOC: Eritrean National Olympic Committee
- Website: www.erinoc.org

in Dakar, Senegal October 31, 2026 – November 13, 2026
- Competitors: 5 in 2 sports
- Flag bearers: Kanari Estifanos & Ghebreab Mantay
- Medals: Gold 0 Silver 0 Bronze 0 Total 0

Summer Youth Olympics appearances
- 2010; 2014; 2018; 2026

Eritrea is scheduled to compete at the 2026 Summer Youth Olympics in Dakar, Senegal from October 31 to November 13, 2026. This will mark Eritrea's fourth appearance at the Youth Olympics, after making its debut in 2010.

Athletes Kanari Estifanos and Ghebreab Mantay served as the flag bearers for the opening ceremony.

== Competitors ==
The following is the list of number of competitors participating at the Games per sport/discipline.

| Sport | Men | Women | Total |
|---|---|---|---|
| Athletics | 2 | 1 | 3 |
| Road cycling | 1 | 1 | 1 |
| Total | 3 | 2 | 5 |

== Athletics ==
Eritrea entered one male athlete.

=== Track & road events ===
Men

| Athlete | Event | Heat | | Semifinal | | Final | |
| Athlete | Event | Result | Rank | Result | Rank | Result | Rank |
|---|---|---|---|---|---|---|---|
| Ghebreab Mantay | 800 m | | | | | | |
| Ghebreab Mantay | 1500 m | | | | | | |
| Samuel Niguse | 3000 m | | | | | | |

Women

| Athlete | Event | Heat | | Semifinal | | Final | |
| Athlete | Event | Result | Rank | Result | Rank | Result | Rank |
|---|---|---|---|---|---|---|---|
| Kanari Estifanos | 1500 m | | | | | | |
| Kanari Estifanos | 3000 m | | | | | | |

== Road cycling ==
Eritrea entered two athletes, one of each gender.

Men

| Athlete | Event | Time | Rank |
|---|---|---|---|
| Sirak Bereket | Road race | | |
| Sirak Bereket | Time trial | | |

Women

| Athlete | Event | Time | Rank |
|---|---|---|---|
| Elyana Kubrom | Road race | | |
| Elyana Kubrom | Time trial | | |
