= Costa Rica at the 2026 Summer Youth Olympics =

- Flag of Costa Rica
- IOC code: CRC
- NOC: Costa Rican Olympic Committee
- Website: concrc.org

in Dakar, Senegal October 31, 2026 – November 13, 2026
- Competitors: 16 in 6 sports
- Flag bearers: Jimena Morales & Lucca Lobo
- Medals: Gold 0 Silver 0 Bronze 0 Total 0

Summer Youth Olympics appearances
- 2010; 2014; 2018; 2026

Costa Rica is scheduled to compete at the 2026 Summer Youth Olympics in Dakar, Senegal from October 31 to November 13, 2026. This will mark Costa Rica's fourth appearance at the Youth Olympics, after making its debut in 2010.

Judoka Jimena Morales and table tennis player Lucca Lobo served as the flag bearers for the opening ceremony.

== Competitors ==
The following is the list of number of competitors participating at the Games per sport/discipline.

Sport	Men	Women	Total
Athletics	1	0	1
Fencing	1	0	1
Futsal	0	10	10
Judo	0	1	1
Road cycling	1	1	2
Swimming	1	1	1
Table tennis	1	0	1
Triathlon	0	1	1
Total	5	14	19

== Athletics ==
Costa Rica entered one female athlete for the track and road events.

=== Track & road events ===
Women

Athlete	Event	Heat		Semifinal		Final	
Athlete	Event	Result	Rank	Result	Rank	Result	Rank
Rihana Mora	200 m						

== Fencing ==
Costa Rica entered one male athlete.

Athlete	Event	Round of 64	Round of 32	Round of 16	Quarterfinal	Semifinal	Final / BM	
Athlete	Event	Opposition Score	Opposition Score	Opposition Score	Opposition Score	Opposition Score	Opposition Score	Rank
Sebastián Acosta	Women's sabre							

== Futsal ==
Costa Rica entered a team for the women's tournament.

Summary

Event	Group stage				Semifinal	Final / BM	
Event	Opposition Score	Opposition Score	Opposition Score	Group Rank	Opposition Score	Opposition Score	Rank
Men's tournament	Italy	Cameroon	Iran				

Roster

- Naidelyn Barquero
- Mariangel Cedeno
- Brithney Espinoza
- Daniela Goni
- Emma le Claire
- Valentina Martínez
- Nicole Herradora
- Jimena Soto
- Abigail Ugalde
- Michelle Villalobos

== Judo ==
Costa Rica entered one female judoka based on the available quotas assigned by the International Judo Federation.

Women

Athlete	Event	Round of 16	Quarterfinals	Semifinals	Repechage	Final / BM	
Athlete	Event	Opposition Result	Opposition Result	Opposition Result	Opposition Result	Opposition Result	Rank
Jimena Morales	-52 kg						

== Road cycling ==
Costa Rica entered two athletes, one male and one female.

Women

Athlete	Event	Time	Rank
Francell Martínez	Road race		
Francell Martínez	Time trial		

== Swimming ==
Costa Rica entered two swimmers, one male and one female.

Athlete	Event	Heat		Semifinal		Final	
Athlete	Event	Time	Rank	Time	Rank	Time	Rank
Andrés Rojas	100 m freestyle						
Andrés Rojas	200 m freestyle						
Andrés Rojas	400 m freestyle						
Isabela Matarrita	50 m freestyle						
Isabela Matarrita	100 m freestyle						
Isabela Matarrita	200 m freestyle						
Isabela Matarrita	400 m freestyle						

== Table tennis ==
Costa Rica entered one male athlete.

Athlete	Event	Preliminary	Round 1	Round 2	Round 3	Round of 16	Quarterfinals	Semifinals	Final / BM	
Athlete	Event	Opposition Result	Opposition Result	Opposition Result	Opposition Result	Opposition Result	Opposition Result	Opposition Result	Opposition Result	Rank
Locca Lobo	Men's singles									

== Triathlon ==
Costa Rica entered one female athlete.

Athlete	Event	Time						Rank
Athlete	Event	Swim (750m)	Trans 1	Bike (20km)	Trans 2	Run (5km)	Total	Rank
Victoria Arce	Women's individual							
