= Uzbekistan at the 2026 Summer Youth Olympics =

- Flag of Uzbekistan
- IOC code: UZB
- NOC: National Olympic Committee of the Republic of Uzbekistan
- Website: www.olympic.uz

in Dakar, Senegal October 31, 2026 – November 13, 2026
- Competitors: 19 in 11 sports
- Flag bearers: Parizod Abdukarimova & Jurabek Eshpulatov
- Medals: Gold 2 Silver 4 Bronze 2 Total 8

Summer Youth Olympics appearances (overview)
- 2010; 2014; 2018; 2026

Uzbekistan is scheduled to compete at the 2026 Summer Youth Olympics in Dakar, Senegal from October 31 to November 13, 2026. This will mark Uzbekistan's fourth appearance at the Youth Olympics, after making its debut in 2010.

Swimmer Parizod Abdukarimova and judoka Jurabek Eshpulatov served as the flag bearers for the opening ceremony.

== Competitors ==
The following is the list of number of competitors participating at the Games per sport/discipline.

Sport	Men	Women	Total
Archery	1	0	1
Artistic gymnastics	0	1	1
Athletics	1	5	6
Boxing	1	2	3
Fencing	0	1	1
Judo	1	0	1
Road cycling	0	1	1
Swimming	1	1	2
Taekwondo	1	0	1
Triathlon	1	0	1
Wushu	0	1	1
Total	7	12	19

== Archery ==
Uzbekistan entered one male archer.

Men

Athlete	Event	Ranking Round		Round of 16	Quarterfinals	Semifinals	Final / BM	Rank
Athlete	Event	Score	Seed	Opposition Score	Opposition Score	Opposition Score	Opposition Score	Rank
Bekzod Boborajabov	Individual							

== Artistic gymnastics ==
Uzbekistan entered one female gymnast.

Girls

Athlete	Event	Qualification						Final					
Athlete	Event	Apparatus				Total	Rank	Apparatus				Total	Rank
Athlete	Event	V	UB	BB	F	Total	Rank	V	UB	BB	F	Total	Rank
Yoroslava Chernobrovkina	All-around	11.900	8.466	11.033	11.700	43.099	41	did not qualify					

== Athletics ==
Uzbekistan entered six athletes, one male and five female.

=== Track & road events ===
Women

Athlete	Event	Heat		Semifinal		Final	
Athlete	Event	Result	Rank	Result	Rank	Result	Rank
Munavvar Holtorayeva	1500 m						
Nashimakhon Mamirova	2000 m steeplechase						
Niginabonu Rajabova	100 m hurdles						
Shodiyona Rahmonova	400 m hurdles						

=== Field events ===
Women

Athlete	Event	Qualification		Final	
Athlete	Event	Distance	Position	Distance	Position
Parizoda Talabova	Javelin throw				

== Boxing ==
Uzbekistan entered three boxers, one male and two female.

Men

Athlete	Weight	Round of 16	Quarterfinals	Semifinals	Final / BM	
Athlete	Weight	Opposition Result	Opposition Result	Opposition Result	Opposition Result	Rank
Ybrokhim Shokirjonov	–65 kg					

Women

Athlete	Weight	Round of 16	Quarterfinals	Semifinals	Final / BM	
Athlete	Weight	Opposition Result	Opposition Result	Opposition Result	Opposition Result	Rank
Sabrina Chakomanova	–54 kg					
Rushanabonu Isoeva	–60 kg					

== Fencing ==
Uzbekistan entered one female athlete.

Athlete	Event	Round of 64	Round of 32	Round of 16	Quarterfinal	Semifinal	Final / BM	
Athlete	Event	Opposition Score	Opposition Score	Opposition Score	Opposition Score	Opposition Score	Opposition Score	Rank
Nargiza Utebaeva	Women's sabre							

== Judo ==
Uzbekistan entered one male judoka based on the available quotas assigned by the International Judo Federation.

Men

Athlete	Event	Round of 16	Quarterfinals	Semifinals	Repechage	Final / BM	
Athlete	Event	Opposition Result	Opposition Result	Opposition Result	Opposition Result	Opposition Result	Rank
Jurabek Eshpulatov	–100 kg						

== Road cycling ==
Uzbekistan entered one female athlete.

Women

Athlete	Event	Time	Rank
Gulhayo Sattorova	Road race		
Gulhayo Sattorova	Time trial		

== Swimming ==
Uzbekistan entered two swimmers, one male and one female.

Athlete	Event	Heat		Semifinal		Final	
Athlete	Event	Time	Rank	Time	Rank	Time	Rank
Muhammadismail Rahmonov	50 m breaststroke						
Muhammadismail Rahmonov	100 m breaststroke						
Muhammadismail Rahmonov	200 m breaststroke						
Parizod Abdukarimova	50 m freestyle						
Parizod Abdukarimova	50 m backstroke						
Parizod Abdukarimova	100 m backstroke						

== Taekwondo ==
Uzbekistan entered one male athlete.

Men

Athlete	Event	Round of 16	Quarterfinals	Semifinals	Repechage	Final / BM	
Athlete	Event	Opposition Result	Opposition Result	Opposition Result	Opposition Result	Opposition Result	Rank
Asadbek Samandarov	–55 kg						

== Triathlon ==
Uzbekistan entered one male athlete.

Athlete	Event	Time						Rank
Athlete	Event	Swim (750m)	Trans 1	Bike (20km)	Trans 2	Run (5km)	Total	Rank
Abilaykhan Orinbasarov	Men's individual							

== Wushu ==
Uzbekistan entered one female athlete after quotas were assigned by the International Wushu Federation.

Athlete	Event	Taijishan routine		Taijiquan routine		Total Points	Final Rank
Athlete	Event	Points	Rank	Points	Rank	Total Points	Final Rank
Gulirano Kholmuninova	Women's taijiquan combined						
