= Kazakhstan at the 2026 Summer Youth Olympics =

- Flag of Kazakhstan
- IOC code: KAZ
- NOC: National Olympic Committee of the Republic of Kazakhstan
- Website: www.olympic.kz

in Dakar, Senegal October 31, 2026 – November 13, 2026
- Competitors: 18 in 11 sports
- Flag bearers: Fatima Supygaliyeva & Alikhan Agabek
- Medals: Gold 1 Silver 0 Bronze 0 Total 1

Summer Youth Olympics appearances (overview)
- 2010; 2014; 2018; 2026

Kazakhstan is scheduled to compete at the 2026 Summer Youth Olympics in Dakar, Senegal from October 31 to November 13, 2026. This will mark Kazakhstan's fourth appearance at the Youth Olympics, after making its debut in 2010.

Judoka Fatima Supygaliyeva and beach volleyball player Alikhan Agabek served as the flag bearers for the opening ceremony.

== Competitors ==
The following is the list of number of competitors participating at the Games per sport/discipline.

Sport	Men	Women	Total
Artistic gymnastics	1	1	2
Athletics	1	1	2
Beach volleyball	2	0	2
Boxing	1	2	3
Breaking	0	1	1
Fencing	1	0	1
Judo	0	1	1
Road cycling	1	1	2
Swimming	1	1	2
Triathlon	1	0	1
Taekwondo	0	1	1
Total	9	9	18

== Artistic gymnastics ==
Kazakhstan entered two gymnasts, one male and one female.

Boys

Athlete	Event	Qualification								Final							
Athlete	Event	Apparatus						Total	Rank	Apparatus						Total	Rank
Athlete	Event	F	PH	R	V	PB	HB	Total	Rank	F	PH	R	V	PB	HB	Total	Rank
Andrey Terman	All-around	11.833	10.800	11.400	11.800	11.966	11.400	69.199	41	did not qualify							

Girls

Athlete	Event	Qualification						Final					
Athlete	Event	Apparatus				Total	Rank	Apparatus				Total	Rank
Athlete	Event	V	UB	BB	F	Total	Rank	V	UB	BB	F	Total	Rank
Yeva Tatsiyeva	All-around	12.733	10.500	11.933	12.700	47.866	21 Q	12.933	10.733	11.800	11.966	47.432	15

== Athletics ==
Kazakhstan entered two athletes, one of each gender.

=== Track & road events ===
Women

Athlete	Event	Heat		Semifinal		Final	
Athlete	Event	Result	Rank	Result	Rank	Result	Rank
Margarita Kossinova	400 m hurdles						

=== Field events ===
Men

Athlete	Event	Qualification		Final	
Athlete	Event	Distance	Position	Distance	Position
Maxim Sazhnev	Discus throw				

== Beach volleyball ==
Kazakhstan received a quota place for the men's tournament.

Summary

Team	Event	Group stage				Round of 16	Quarterfinals	Semifinals	Final / PG / BM	
Team	Event	Opposition Result	Opposition Result	Opposition Result	Rank	Opposition Result	Opposition Result	Opposition Result	Opposition Result	Rank
Orazali Sagynysh; Alikhan Agabek	Men's tournament									

== Boxing ==
Kazakhstan entered three athletes, one male and two female.

Men

Athlete	Weight	Round of 16	Quarterfinals	Semifinals	Final / BM	
Athlete	Weight	Opposition Result	Opposition Result	Opposition Result	Opposition Result	Rank
Bibarys Ashirbay	–70 kg					

Women

Athlete	Weight	Round of 16	Quarterfinals	Semifinals	Final / BM	
Athlete	Weight	Opposition Result	Opposition Result	Opposition Result	Opposition Result	Rank
Maral Tolepbergen	–54 kg					
Aknur Tursyngali	–57 kg					

== Breaking ==
Kazakhstan entered one female athlete.

Athlete	Nickname	Event	Group Stage			Quarterfinal	Semifinal	Final / BM	
Athlete	Nickname	Event	Round	Votes	Rank	Opposition Result	Opposition Result	Opposition Result	Rank
	Aizara	B-Girls							

== Fencing ==
Kazakhstan entered one male athlete.

Athlete	Event	Round of 64	Round of 32	Round of 16	Quarterfinal	Semifinal	Final / BM	
Athlete	Event	Opposition Score	Opposition Score	Opposition Score	Opposition Score	Opposition Score	Opposition Score	Rank
Aibar Kaiym	Men's sabre							

== Judo ==
Kazakhstan entered one female judoka based on the available quotas assigned by the International Judo Federation.

Women

Athlete	Event	Round of 16	Quarterfinals	Semifinals	Repechage	Final / BM	
Athlete	Event	Opposition Result	Opposition Result	Opposition Result	Opposition Result	Opposition Result	Rank
Fatima Supygaliyeva	–78 kg						

== Road cycling ==
Kazakhstan entered two athletes, one of each gender.

Men

Athlete	Event	Time	Rank
Gleb Novikov	Road race		
Gleb Novikov	Time trial		

Women

Athlete	Event	Time	Rank
Anel Tashbay	Road race		
Anel Tashbay	Time trial		

== Swimming ==
Kazakhstan entered two swimmers, one male and one female.

Athlete	Event	Heat		Semifinal		Final	
Athlete	Event	Time	Rank	Time	Rank	Time	Rank
Anatooliy Rodenko	100 m freestyle						
Anatooliy Rodenko	50 m breaststroke						
Anatooliy Rodenko	100 m breaststroke						
Anatooliy Rodenko	200 m breaststroke						
Darya Chesnokova	50 m freestyle						
Darya Chesnokova	50 m backstroke						
Darya Chesnokova	100 m backstroke						

== Triathlon ==
Kazakhstan entered one male athlete.

Athlete	Event	Time						Rank
Athlete	Event	Swim (750m)	Trans 1	Bike (20km)	Trans 2	Run (5km)	Total	Rank
Ramazan Ainegov	Men's individual							

== Taekwondo ==
Kazakhstan entered one female athlete.

Women

Athlete	Event	Round of 16	Quarterfinals	Semifinals	Repechage	Final / BM	
Athlete	Event	Opposition Result	Opposition Result	Opposition Result	Opposition Result	Opposition Result	Rank
Lyubov Yun	–63 kg						
