= Ethiopia at the 2026 Summer Youth Olympics =

- Flag of Ethiopia
- IOC code: ETH
- NOC: Ethiopian Olympic Committee
- Website: ethiopianolympic.org

in Dakar, Senegal October 31, 2026 – November 13, 2026
- Competitors: 18 in 5 sports
- Flag bearers: Samirawit Akele & Natenael Hagos
- Medals Ranked 5th: Gold 5 Silver 3 Bronze 0 Total 8

Summer Youth Olympics appearances
- 2010; 2014; 2018; 2026

Ethiopia is scheduled to compete at the 2026 Summer Youth Olympics in Dakar, Senegal from October 31 to November 13, 2026. This will mark Ethiopia's fourth appearance at the Youth Olympics, after making its debut in 2010.

Swimmer Samirawit Akele and wushu taolu athlete Natenael Hagos served as the flag bearers for the opening ceremony.

== Competitors ==
The following is the list of number of competitors participating at the Games per sport/discipline.

Sport	Men	Women	Total
Athletics	4	6	10
Road cycling	1	1	2
Swimming	2	2	4
Taekwondo	1	0	1
Wushu	1	0	1
Total	9	9	18

== Athletics ==
Ethiopia entered one male athlete.

=== Track & road events ===
Men

Athlete	Event	Semifinal		Final	
Athlete	Event	Result	Rank	Result	Rank
Yomif Abebe	800 m	1:54.36	2	1:48.99	1
Wabi Seblega	1500 m			3:58.73	1
Goytom Mekonen	3000 m			8:08.24	2
Junedin Abdo	2000 m steeplechase			5:29.30	1

Women

Athlete	Event	Semifinal		Final	
Athlete	Event	Result	Rank	Result	Rank
Kurigni Desta	400 m			57.45	DNQ
Netsanet Selemon	800 m	2:08.28	Q	2:04.43	1
Elsabet Amare	1500 m			4:28.02	1
Yordanos Tsigab	3000 m			9:15.71	2
Mekonen Abera	2000 m steeplechase			6:32.15	2
Neima Nuredin	5000 m race walk				

== Road cycling ==
Eritrea entered two athletes, one of each gender.

Men

Athlete	Event	Time	Rank
Legese Gebreslasie	Road race		
Legese Gebreslasie	Time trial		

Women

Athlete	Event	Time	Rank
Mahder Niguse	Road race		
Mahder Niguse	Time trial		

== Swimming ==
Ethiopia entered four swimmers, two of each gender.

Athlete	Event	Heat		Final	
Athlete	Event	Time	Rank	Time	Rank
Dagim Habte	50 m freestyle				
Dagim Habte	100 m butterfly				
Dagim Habte	200 m individual medley				
Betselote Gebreyohannes	100 m freestyle				
Betselote Gebreyohannes	100 m backstroke				
Betselote Gebreyohannes	100 m breaststroke				
Samrawit Akele	50 m freestyle				
Samrawit Akele	50 m backstroke				
Samrawit Akele	50 m butterfly				
Elham Hussein	50 m breaststroke				
Elham Hussein	100 m breaststroke				
Elham Hussein	100 m butterfly				

== Taekwondo ==
Ethiopia entered one male athlete.

Men

Athlete	Event	Round of 16	Quarterfinals	Semifinals	Repechage	Final / BM	
Athlete	Event	Opposition Result	Opposition Result	Opposition Result	Opposition Result	Opposition Result	Rank
Sifen Gashaw	-48 kg	Bye					

== Wushu ==
Ethiopia entered one male athlete after quotas were assigned by the International Wushu Federation.

Athlete	Event	Changquan routine		Gunshu routine		Total Points	Final Rank
Athlete	Event	Points	Rank	Points	Rank	Total Points	Final Rank
Natnael Hagos	Men's changquan combined						
