= Road cycling at the 2026 Summer Youth Olympics – Men's road time trial =

Men's individual time trial at the IV Summer Youth Olympic Games
- Venue: Corniche Ouest (8.5 km)
- Date: 10 November
- Competitors: 39 from 38 nations
- Winning time: 10:10.20

Medalists
1st place, gold medalist(s)		Timotej Michalík	Slovakia
2nd place, silver medalist(s)		Lorenzo Ceccarello	Italy
3rd place, bronze medalist(s)		Daan Wilmsen	Belgium

The men's individual time trial event at the 2026 Summer Youth Olympics took place on 10 November 2026 on a course that started and finished at Corniche Ouest in Dakar.

== Results ==
Rank	#	Cyclist	Nation	Time	Diff.
1st place, gold medalist(s)	37	Timotej Michalík	Slovakia	10:10.20	
2nd place, silver medalist(s)	7	Lorenzo Ceccarello	Italy	10:17.94	+7.74
3rd place, bronze medalist(s)	5	Daan Wilmsen	Belgium	10:20.39	+10.19
4	17	Caleb McKenzie	Australia	10:20.43	+10.23
5	3	Rohnan Nicholson	Zimbabwe	10:29.54	+19.34
6	29	Gleb Novikov	Kazakhstan	10:34.15	+23.95
7	34	Stepan Bortnik	Russia	10:35.16	+24.96
8	21	Juan Esteban Sánchez	Colombia	10:35.81	+25.61
9	1	Alejandro Wymmersch	Spain	10:38.36	+28.16
10	32	Gianluigi Zamudio	Mexico	10:38.42	+28.22
11	8	Zéphirin Le Normand-Lucas	France	10:40.84	+30.64
12	4	Selmane Mansouri	Algeria	10:44.03	+33.83
13	33	Wojciech Pukowski	Poland	10:45.16	+34.96
14	22	Matías Calzada	Costa Rica	10:49.05	+38.85
15	31	Ričards Hansons	Latvia	10:55.86	+45.66
16	15	David Adam	Slovenia	11:00.74	+50.54
17	40	Dmytro Starovoitov	Ukraine	11:02.30	+52.10
18	23	Adam Kment	Czech Republic	11:05.90	+55.70
19	26	György Fortuna	Hungary	11:06.90	+56.70
20	12	Legese Gebreslasie	Ethiopia	11:07.98	+57.78
21	27	Fathan Hidayatullah	Indonesia	11:12.46	+1:02.26
22	20	Dimitar Mitev	Bulgaria	11:16.20	+1:06.00
23	11	Youssef Chehaibi	Tunisia	11:24.04	+1:13.84
24	28	Amir Koneshlou	Iran	11:37.44	+1:27.24
25	9	Mike Baartman	Namibia	11:42.29	+1:32.09
26	25	Lee Wan Chun	Hong Kong	11:42.71	+1:32.51
27	41	Rikeybeth Alvarado	Venezuela	11:43.99	+1:33.79
28	10	Emmanuel Shema	Rwanda	11:44.29	+1:34.09
29	14	Imrane Serhani	Morocco	11:47.02	+1:36.82
30	6	Yahyaa Martin	South Africa	11:48.33	+1:38.13
31	2	Thomas Harel	Mauritius	11:48.79	+1:38.59
32	19	Rafael Bejarano	Bolivia	11:50.11	+1:39.91
33	38	Sultan Al-Hammadi	United Arab Emirates	11:58.76	+1:48.56
34	18	Nihad Khudoyev	Azerbaijan	12:23.09	+2:12.89
35	16	Mariano Lucamba	Angola	12:40.88	+2:30.68
36	35	Ibrahima Gaye	Senegal	12:53.02	+2:42.82
37	36	Abdou Ngom	Senegal	12:59.65	+2:49.45
38	39	Ali Ssali	Uganda	13:54.68	+3:44.48
	13	Matteo Zambelli	Austria	Did not finish	
