= Road cycling at the 2026 Summer Youth Olympics – Men's individual road race =

Men's individual road race at the IV Summer Youth Olympic Games
- Venue: Corniche Ouest (76.5 km)
- Date: 8 November
- Competitors: 39 from 38 nations
- Winning time: 1:47:04

Medalists
1st place, gold medalist(s)		Daan Wilmsen	Belgium
2nd place, silver medalist(s)		Stepan Bortnik	Russia
3rd place, bronze medalist(s)		Caleb McKenzie	Australia

The men's individual road race event at the 2026 Summer Youth Olympics took place on 8 November 2026 on a course that started and finished at Corniche Ouest in Dakar.

== Results ==
Rank	#	Cyclist	Nation	Time	Diff.
1st place, gold medalist(s)	5	Daan Wilmsen	Belgium	1:47:04	
2nd place, silver medalist(s)	34	Stepan Bortnik	Russia	1:47:04	+0:00
3rd place, bronze medalist(s)	17	Caleb McKenzie	Australia	1:47:04	+0:00
4	37	Timotej Michalík	Slovakia	1:47:04	+0:00
5	32	Gianluigi Zamudio	Mexico	1:47:10	+0:06
6	31	Ričards Hansons	Latvia	1:47:30	+0:26
7	21	Juan Esteban Sánchez	Colombia	1:47:30	+0:26
8	13	Matteo Zambelli	Austria	1:47:30	+0:26
9	3	Rohnan Nicholson	Zimbabwe	1:47:30	+0:26
10	41	Rikeybeth Alvarado	Venezuela	1:47:33	+0:29
11	8	Zéphirin Le Normand-Lucas	France	1:47:58	+0:54
12	7	Lorenzo Ceccarello	Italy	1:48:03	+0:59
13	27	Fathan Hidayatullah	Indonesia	1:48:03	+0:59
14	15	David Adam	Slovenia	1:48:03	+0:59
15	1	Alejandro Wymmersch	Spain	1:48:03	+0:59
16	16	Mariano Lucamba	Angola	1:48:03	+0:59
17	14	Imrane Serhani	Morocco	1:48:03	+0:59
18	40	Dmytro Starovoitov	Ukraine	1:48:03	+0:59
19	33	Wojciech Pukowski	Poland	1:48:03	+0:59
20	4	Selmane Mansouri	Algeria	1:48:03	+0:59
21	22	Matías Calzada	Costa Rica	1:48:03	+0:59
22	29	Gleb Novikov	Kazakhstan	1:48:03	+0:59
23	12	Legese Gebreslasie	Ethiopia	1:48:03	+0:59
24	25	Lee Wan Chun	Hong Kong	1:48:03	+0:59
25	9	Mike Baartman	Namibia	1:48:03	+0:59
26	11	Youssef Chehaibi	Tunisia	1:48:03	+0:59
27	6	Yahyaa Martin	South Africa	1:48:03	+0:59
28	26	György Fortuna	Hungary	1:48:03	+0:59
29	10	Emmanuel Shema	Rwanda	1:48:03	+0:59
30	28	Amir Koneshlou	Iran	1:48:38	+1:34
31	19	Rafael Bejarano	Bolivia	1:48:39	+1:35
32	20	Dimitar Mitev	Bulgaria	1:54:41	+7:37
33	38	Sultan Al-Hammadi	United Arab Emirates	1:54:41	+7:37
	18	Nihad Khudoyev	Azerbaijan	Did not finish	
	36	Abdou Ngom	Senegal	Did not finish	
	35	Ibrahima Gaye	Senegal	Did not finish	
	2	Thomas Harel	Mauritius	Did not finish	
	23	Adam Kment	Czech Republic	Did not finish	
	39	Ali Ssali	Uganda	Did not finish	
