= Bulgaria at the 2026 Summer Youth Olympics =

- IOC code: BUL
- NOC: Bulgarian Olympic Committee
- Website: www.bgolympic.org (in Bulgarian and English)

in Dakar, Senegal 31 October 2026 – 13 November 2026
- Competitors: 17 (9 men and 8 women) in 13 sports
- Flag bearers (opening): Simona Ivanova & Teodor Mitev
- Flag bearers (closing): Nikola Meitsov & Aya Kraeva
- Medals Ranked 69th: Gold 0 Silver 1 Bronze 1 Total 2

Summer Youth Olympics appearances (overview)
- 2010; 2014; 2018; 2026

Bulgaria competed at the 2026 Summer Youth Olympics in Dakar, Senegal, from 31 October to 13 November 2026.

Swimmer Simona Ivanova and badminton player Teodor Mitev were the flag bearers during the opening ceremony. Meanwhile, fencer Nikola Meitsov and breaking athlete Aya Kraeva were the flag bearers during the closing ceremony.

== Medalists ==
Medal	Name	Sport	Event	Date
Silver	Stiliyan Orlinov	Athletics	Men's long jump	8 November
Bronze	Ivan Nikolchev	Judo	Men's 81 kg	2 November

== Competitors ==
The following is the list of number of competitors in the Games.

Sport	Men	Women	Total
Archery	0	1	1
Artistic gymnastics	1	0	1
Athletics	2	1	3
Badminton	1	1	2
Beach wrestling	0	1	1
Breaking	0	1	1
Road cycling	1	0	1
Fencing	1	0	1
Judo	1	0	1
Skateboarding	0	1	1
Swimming	1	1	2
Taekwondo	1	0	1
Wushu	0	1	1
Total	9	8	17

== Archery ==
Athlete	Event	Ranking Round		Round of 16	Quarterfinals	Semifinals	Final / BM	Rank
Athlete	Event	Score	Seed	Opposition Score	Opposition Score	Opposition Score	Opposition Score	Rank
Neda Kenderova	Women's individual	644	14	Chaieb (TUN); W 6–0	Khadake (IND); L 0–6	Did not advance		

== Artistic gymnastics ==
Men

Athlete	Event	Qualification								Final							
Athlete	Event	Apparatus						Total	Rank	Apparatus						Total	Rank
Athlete	Event	F	PH	R	V	PB	HB	Total	Rank	F	PH	R	V	PB	HB	Total	Rank
Nikalas Nakov	All-around	11.700	11.566	11.366	11.833	11.966	12.600	71.031	29	Did not advance							

== Athletics ==
Track & road events

Athlete	Event	Semifinal		Final	
Athlete	Event	Result	Rank	Result	Rank
Vasil Antonov	Men's 400 m	49.07	2 Q	47.90	4
Zara Ilieva	Women's 3000 m	—N/a		10:07.71	6

Field events

Athlete	Event	Final	
Athlete	Event	Distance	Position
Stiliyan Orlinov	Men's long jump	7.30	2nd place, silver medalist(s)

== Badminton ==
Athlete	Event	Group stage				Round of 16	Quarter-final	Semi-final	Final / BM	
Athlete	Event	Opposition Score	Opposition Score	Opposition Score	Rank	Opposition Score	Opposition Score	Opposition Score	Opposition Score	Rank
Teodor Mitev	Men's singles	Radovanović (SRB); W (21–10, 21–17)	Yu (NZL); W (21–12, 21–11)	Sow (FRA); L (16–21, 9–21)	2	Did not advance				
Elena Popivanova	Women's singles	Shochan (IRL); W 2–0	Vakk (EST); L 0–2	Wang (NZL); L 1–2	17	Did not advance				

== Beach wrestling ==
Key:

- VFA (ranking points: 3–0 or 0–3) – Victory by 3-point move and the loser without technical points.
- VFA1 (ranking points: 3–1 or 1–3) – Victory by 3-point move and the loser with technical points.
- VSU (ranking points: 3–0 or 0–3) – Victory by non 3-point move and the loser without technical points.
- VSU1 (ranking points: 3–1 or 1–3) – Victory by non 3-point move and the loser with technical points.
- VPO (ranking points: 2-1 or 1-2) - Victory with less than 3 points.
- VFO (ranking points: 2–0 or 0–2) – Victory by forfeit.

Women

Athlete	Weight	Group stage				Semifinal	Final / BM	
Athlete	Weight	Opposition Result	Opposition Result	Opposition Result	Group Rank	Opposition Result	Opposition Result	Rank
Kristin Iliyna	-45 kg	Ríos (MEX); L VFA 0–3	Brem (GBS); L VSU1 1–3	Rubio (COL); L VFA 0–5	4	Did not advance		

== Breaking ==
Athlete	Nickname	Event	Group Stage				Quarterfinal	Semifinal	Final / BM	
Athlete	Nickname	Event	Opposition Result	Opposition Result	Opposition Result	Rank	Opposition Result	Opposition Result	Opposition Result	Rank
Aya Kraeva	A2K	B-Girls	Nikastar (UKR); L (0–2)	Aizara (KAZ); L (0–2)	Krazy (USA); D (1–1)	4	Did not advance			

== Road cycling ==
Athlete	Event	Time	Rank
Dimitar Mitev	Men's road race	1:54:41	32
Dimitar Mitev	Men's individual time trial	11:16.20	22

== Fencing ==
Athlete	Event	Pool Round	Seed	Round of 16	Quarterfinals	Semifinals	Final / BM	Rank
Athlete	Event	Opposition Score	Seed	Opposition Score	Opposition Score	Opposition Score	Opposition Score	Rank
Nikola Meitsov	Men's sabre	Al-Duaij (KUW) W 5–4; Spielberg (GER) L 4–5; El Ghanja (TUN) W 5–1; Yembele (COD) W 5–1; Urushadze (GEO) W 5–4	4	Gueye (SEN); W 15–2	Kaiym (KAZ); L 10–15	Did not advance		7

== Judo ==
Men

Athlete	Event	Round of 16	Quarterfinals	Semifinals	Repechage 1	Repechage 2	Final / BM	
Athlete	Event	Opposition Result	Opposition Result	Opposition Result	Opposition Result	Opposition Result	Opposition Result	Rank
Ivan Nikolchev	−81 kg	—N/a	Charalampous (CYP); W 10–0	Cebulj (SLO); L 0–1	—N/a		Kargbo (SLE); W 111–000	3rd place, bronze medalist(s)

== Skateboarding ==
Athlete	Event	Semifinal		Final	
Athlete	Event	Result	Rank	Result	Rank
Julia Plaggenborg	Women's street	18.19	12	Did not advance	

== Swimming ==
Men

Athlete	Event	Heats		Final	
Athlete	Event	Time	Rank	Time	Rank
Dimitar Dokuzov	200 m freestyle	1:54.85	15	Did not advance	
Dimitar Dokuzov	400 m freestyle	—N/a		4:06.00	17

Women

Athlete	Event	Heats		Final	
Athlete	Event	Time	Rank	Time	Rank
Simona Ivanova	100 m freestyle	59.47	17	Did not advance	
Simona Ivanova	200 m freestyle	2:06.71	2 Q	2:07.98	7
Simona Ivanova	400 m freestyle	—N/a		4:28.43	4

== Taekwondo ==
Athlete	Event	Round of 16	Quarterfinals	Semifinals	Final	
Athlete	Event	Opposition Result	Opposition Result	Opposition Result	Opposition Result	Rank
Andi Vladimirov	Men's +73 kg	—N/a	Soltanian (IRI); L 0–2	Did not advance		

== Wushu ==
Athlete	Event	Taijishan routine		Taijiquan routine		Total Points	Rank	Taijishan routine		Taijiquan routine		Total Points	Rank
Athlete	Event	Points	Rank	Points	Rank	Total Points	Rank	Points	Rank	Points	Rank	Total Points	Rank
Kalina Slavcheva	Women's taijiquan combined	8.430	9	7.956	10	16.386	9	Did not advance					

== See also ==
- Bulgaria at the 2026 Winter Olympics
- Bulgaria at the 2026 Winter Paralympics
