= Beach wrestling at the 2026 Summer Youth Olympics – Men's 60 kg =

Men's 60 kg at the IV Summer Youth Olympic Games
- Venue: Saly Beach West
- Date: 7 November 2026
- Competitors: 12 from 12 nations

Medalists
1st place, gold medalist(s)		Wilfredo Grabiel González; Venezuela
2nd place, silver medalist(s)		Amirali Domirkolaei; Iran
3rd place, bronze medalist(s)		Davit Mdzevashvili; Georgia

The Men's 60 kg competition in beach wrestling at the 2026 Summer Youth Olympics was held on 7 November 2026 at Saly Beach West.

== Competition format ==
The competition was contested under the beach wrestling rules. Twelve wrestlers were divided into three groups of four athletes each. The wrestlers competed in a round-robin format within their respective groups. The group winners and the best second-placed wrestler advanced to the semifinals. The semifinal winners competed in the gold-medal match, while the semifinal losers contested the bronze-medal match.

== Results ==
Legend

- F — Won by fall
- WO — Won by walkover

=== Notes ===
- LIGHT and DARK indicate the assigned colours of the wrestlers in each bout.
- Technical points represent the points scored by each wrestler during a match.
- Classification points are awarded according to the match result and are used to determine the group standings.
- Q – Qualified for the semifinals as the group winner.
- q – Qualified for the semifinals as the best second-placed wrestler across all groups.

==== Results codes ====
Code	Meaning
VSU	Victory with 3 points, without a 3-point takedown or throw, and without any points scored by the opponent.
VSU1	Victory with 3 points, without a 3-point takedown or throw, but with points scored by the opponent.
VFA	Victory by a 3-point takedown or throw, without any points scored by the opponent.
VFA1	Victory by a 3-point takedown or throw, with points scored by the opponent.
VFO	Victory by forfeit, when an athlete does not show up on the ring.
VPO	Victory with less than 3 points.

=== Group stage ===
==== Group A ====
Round	Match number	Colour	Athlete	NOC code	Technical points	Classification points	Results code
1	1	LIGHT	David Barreira Conde	Portugal	0	0	VSU
1	1	DARK	Amirali Domirkolaei	Iran	3	2	VSU
1	2	LIGHT	Adam Abu Fare	Jordan	2		VFO
1	2	DARK	Duong Pham Van	Vietnam	0		VFO
2	13	LIGHT	David Barreira Conde	Portugal	0	0	VSU
2	13	DARK	Adam Abu Fare	Jordan	3	2	VSU
2	14	LIGHT	Amirali Domirkolaei	Iran	2		VFO
2	14	DARK	Duong Pham Van	Vietnam	0		VFO
3	49	LIGHT	David Barreira Conde	Portugal	2		VFO
3	49	DARK	Duong Pham Van	Vietnam	0		VFO
3	50	LIGHT	Amirali Domirkolaei	Iran	3	2	VSU1
3	50	DARK	Adam Abu Fare	Jordan	1	1	VSU1

Rank	Athlete	NOC code	Matches won	Classification points	Technical points scored	Technical points conceded	Draw number	Qualification
1	Amirali Domirkolaei	Iran	3	6	6	1	169	Q
2	Adam Abu Fare	Jordan	2	5	4	3	176	
3	David Barreira Conde	Portugal	1	2	0	6	7	
4	Duong Pham Van	Vietnam	0	0	0	0	256	

==== Group B ====
Round	Match number	Colour	Athlete	NOC code	Technical points	Classification points	Results code
1	3	LIGHT	Wilfredo Grabiel Rodríguez González	Venezuela	3	4	VFA
1	3	DARK	Shithigona Lisias Shipopyeni	Namibia	0	0	VFA
1	4	LIGHT	Namon Drissa Coulibaly	Ivory Coast	2		VFO
1	4	DARK	Ioannis Kesidis	Greece	0		VFO
2	15	LIGHT	Wilfredo Grabiel Rodríguez González	Venezuela	3	2	VSU
2	15	DARK	Namon Drissa Coulibaly	Ivory Coast	0	0	VSU
2	16	LIGHT	Shithigona Lisias Shipopyeni	Namibia	2		VFO
2	16	DARK	Ioannis Kesidis	Greece	0		VFO
3	51	LIGHT	Wilfredo Grabiel Rodríguez González	Venezuela	2		VFO
3	51	DARK	Ioannis Kesidis	Greece	0		VFO
3	52	LIGHT	Shithigona Lisias Shipopyeni	Namibia	4	4	VFA
3	52	DARK	Namon Drissa Coulibaly	Ivory Coast	0	0	VFA

Rank	Athlete	NOC code	Matches won	Classification points	Technical points scored	Technical points conceded	Draw number	Qualification
1	Wilfredo Grabiel Rodríguez González	Venezuela	3	8	6	0	36	Q
2	Shithigona Lisias Shipopyeni	Namibia	2	6	4	3	149	
3	Namon Drissa Coulibaly	Ivory Coast	1	2	0	7	182	
4	Ioannis Kesidis	Greece	0	0	0	0	255	

==== Group C ====
Round	Match number	Colour	Athlete	NOC code	Technical points	Classification points	Results code
1	5	LIGHT	David Deus	Angola	0	0	VPO
1	5	DARK	Kiril Nahirnyi	Ukraine	1	1	VPO
1	6	LIGHT	Babacar Mbaye	Senegal	5	4	VFA1
1	6	DARK	Davit Mdzevashvili	Georgia	1	1	VFA1
2	17	LIGHT	David Deus	Angola	0	0	VSU
2	17	DARK	Babacar Mbaye	Senegal	3	2	VSU
2	18	LIGHT	Kiril Nahirnyi	Ukraine	0	0	VSU
2	18	DARK	Davit Mdzevashvili	Georgia	3	2	VSU
3	53	LIGHT	David Deus	Angola	0	0	VFA
3	53	DARK	Davit Mdzevashvili	Georgia	3	4	VFA
3	54	LIGHT	Kiril Nahirnyi	Ukraine	0	0	VSU
3	54	DARK	Babacar Mbaye	Senegal	3	2	VSU

Rank	Athlete	NOC code	Matches won	Classification points	Technical points scored	Technical points conceded	Draw number	Qualification
1	Babacar Mbaye	Senegal	3	8	11	1	187	Q
2	Davit Mdzevashvili	Georgia	2	7	7	5	196	q
3	Kiril Nahirnyi	Ukraine	1	1	1	6	102	
4	David Deus	Angola	0	0	0	7	86	

=== Finals ===
The semifinals featured the three group winners and the best second-placed wrestler. Amirali Domirkolaei defeated Davit Mdzevashvili, while Wilfredo Grabiel Rodriguez Gonzalez defeated Babacar Mbaye to advance to the gold-medal match. Rodriguez Gonzalez subsequently won the gold medal after defeating Domirkolaei in the final. Mdzevashvili secured the bronze medal by defeating Mbaye in the bronze-medal match.

Semifinals
1	Amirali Domirkolaei (IRI)	3
4	Davit Mdzevashvili (GEO)	0
3	Wilfredo Grabiel González (VEN)	4
2	Babacar Mbaye (SEN)	1

Final
Wilfredo Grabiel González (VEN)	4
Amirali Domirkolaei (IRI)	0

Bronze-medal match
Davit Mdzevashvili (GEO)	4
Babacar Mbaye (SEN)	1

=== Final classification ===
Rank	Athlete	NOC
1st place, gold medalist(s)	Wilfredo Grabiel González	Venezuela
2nd place, silver medalist(s)	Amirali Domirkolaei	Iran
3rd place, bronze medalist(s)	Davit Mdzevashvili	Georgia
4	Babacar Mbaye	Senegal
5	Shithigona Lisias Shipopyeni	Namibia
6	Adam Abu Fare	Jordan
7	David Barreira Conde	Portugal
8	Namon Drissa Coulibaly	Ivory Coast
9	Kiril Nahirnyi	Ukraine
10	David Deus	Angola
LFO	Ioannis Kesidis	Greece
LFO	Duong Pham Van	Vietnam
