= Czech Republic at the 2026 Summer Youth Olympics =

- Flag of Czech Repbulic
- IOC code: CZE
- NOC: Czech Olympic Committee
- Website: olympijskytym.cz

in Dakar, Senegal October 31, 2026 – November 13, 2026
- Competitors: 35 in 14 sports
- Flag bearers: Laura Žáčková & Zdeněk Procházka
- Medals: Gold 1 Silver 1 Bronze 1 Total 3

Summer Youth Olympics appearances (overview)
- 2010; 2014; 2018; 2026

Czech Republic competed at the 2026 Summer Youth Olympics in Dakar, Senegal from October 31 to November 13, 2026. This was mark Czechia's fourth appearance at the Youth Olympics, after making its debut in 2010.

Swimmer Zdeněk Procházka and skateboarder Laura Žáčková.

== Competitors ==
The following is the list of number of competitors participating at the Games per sport/discipline.

Sport	Men	Women	Total
3x3 basketball	0	4	4
Archery	0	1	0
Artistic gymnastics	1	3	4
Badminton	1	0	1
Coastal rowing	1	1	2
Fencing	1	0	1
Road cycling	1	1	2
Rugby sevens	0	12	12
Sailing	1	0	1
Skateboarding	0	1	1
Swimming	1	1	2
Table tennis	0	1	1
Taekwondo	1	1	2
Triathlon	1	0	1
Total	9	26	35

== 3x3 basketball ==
Czech Republic entered a team for the women's tournament.

Summary

Event	Pool play			Quarterfinal	Semifinal	Final / BM	
Event	Opposition Score	Opposition Score	Group Rank	Opposition Score	Opposition Score	Opposition Score	Rank
Women's tournament	Egypt; L 8–12	Ukraine; W 12–10	2	China; L 14–21	did not advance		5

Roster

- Aneta Bohuslavová
- Laura Marcolová
- Lucie Pavlíková
- Tereza Svatoňová

== Archery ==
Czech Republic entered one female archer.

Athlete	Event	Ranking round		1/16 Elimination Round	1/16 Round	Quarterfinals	Semifinals	Final / BM	
Athlete	Event	Score	Rank	Opposition Result	Opposition Result	Opposition Result	Opposition Result	Opposition Result	Rank
Anna Kadlecová	Women's individuals	598	28	Lapouge (FRA); L 0–6	did not qualify				

== Artistic gymnastics ==
Czech Republic entered a team of four gymnasts, three female and one male.

Boys

Athlete	Event	Qualification								Final							
Athlete	Event	Apparatus						Total	Rank	Apparatus						Total	Rank
Athlete	Event	F	PH	R	V	PB	HB	Total	Rank	F	PH	R	V	PB	HB	Total	Rank
David Šindelka	All-around	12.800	11.333	10.933	13.366	11.233	11.933	71.598	24	did not qualify							

Girls

Athlete	Event	Qualification						Final					
Athlete	Event	Apparatus				Total	Rank	Apparatus				Total	Rank
Athlete	Event	V	UB	BB	FX	Total	Rank	V	UB	BB	FX	Total	Rank
Kateřina Maříková	Team	11.800	10.300	11.100	11.266	44.466	35	11.833		11.766	11.266	—N/a	
Agáta Slezáková	Team	11.800	10.700	10.266	11.600	44.366	37	11.533	10.533		10.566	—N/a	
Sára Sobolová	Team	11.000	11.733	10.466	11.166	44.365	38		11.000	11.366		—N/a	
Total	Team	23.600	22.433	21.566	22.866	90.465	9 R1 (Note: After Canada withdrew from the team final, Czech Republic was substituted in as first reserve.)	23.366	21.533	23.132	21.832	89.863	8

Mixed

Athletes	Event	Qualification								Final
Athletes	Event	Apparatus						Total	Rank	Final
Athletes	Event	M-F	PB	HB	UB	BB	W-F	Total	Rank	Final
Kateřina Maříková; Agáta Slezáková; Sára Sobolová; David Šindelka	Mixed team	12.800	11.233	11.933	11.733	11.100	11.600	70.399	14	DNQ

== Badminton ==
Czech Republic entered one two athletes, one male and one female.

Athlete	Event	Group H				Quarterfinals	Semifinals	Final / BM	
Athlete	Event	Opposition Result	Opposition Result	Opposition Result	Rank	Opposition Result	Opposition Result	Opposition Result	Rank
Petr Bříza	Men's singles	Gullaiya (CAN); L 15–21, 12–21	Ruparelia (IND); L 13–21, 16–21	Diagne (SEN); W 21–11, 21–10	3	did not qualify			

== Coastal rowing ==
Czech Republic entered two rowers, one of each gender.

Athlete	Event	Time Trials 1		Time Trials 2		Round of 16	Quarterfinals	Semifinals	Final / BM	
Athlete	Event	Time	Rank	Time	Rank	Opposition Result	Opposition Result	Opposition Result	Opposition Result	Rank
Ondřej Žižka	Men's solo	2:51.79	19	2:33.14	4 Q	Meyer (GER); W 2:24.85 vs. 2:31.43	Dreyer (RSA); L 2:24.66 vs. 2:24.52	did not qualify		5
Marie Zavadilová	Women's solo	3:02.40	4 Q	DNP		Hakala (FIN); W 2:46.52 vs. 2:54.50	Griffin (AUS); W 2:40.95 vs. 2:43.19	Guerra Gonzalez (GER); L 2:48.92 vs. 2:36.89	Lopez Valera (ESP); L 2:50.40 vs. 2:50.19	4
Ondřej Žižka; Marie Zavadilová	Mixed double sculls	2:38.19	4	—N/a		Great Britain; L 2:16.34 vs. 2:19.86	Ukraine; L 2:16.76 vs. 2:15.30	did not qualify		5

== Fencing ==
Czech Republic entered one male athlete.

Athlete	Event	Pool							Round of 16	Quarterfinal	Semifinal	Final / BM	
Athlete	Event	Opposition Score	Opposition Score	Opposition Score	Opposition Score	Opposition Score	Opposition Score	Rank	Opposition Score	Opposition Score	Opposition Score	Opposition Score	Rank
Kryštof Novák	Mens' foil	Eldeeb (QAT); L 4–5	Thiam (SEN); W 5–0	Maslau (BLR); W 5–3	Maeda (JPN); L 1–5	Belbouab (GBR); L 3–5	Juras (LTU); W 5–2	7	Acosta Murillo (CRC); W 15–9	Ho (HKG); L 2–15	did not advance		7

== Road Cycling ==
Czech Republic entered two cyclists.

Men

Athlete	Event	Time	Diff.	Rank
Adam Kment	Men's road race	did not finish		
Adam Kment	Men's time trial	11:05.90	+55.70	18

Women

Athlete	Event	Time	Diff.	Rank
Linda Sítková	Women's road race	1:31:19	+0:00	3rd place, bronze medalist(s)
Linda Sítková	Women's time trial	11:58.06	+25.49	5

== Rugby sevens ==
Czech Republic entered a team for the women's tournament.

Summary

Event	Group stage				Semifinal	Final / BM	
Event	Opposition Score	Opposition Score	Opposition Score	Group Rank	Opposition Score	Opposition Score	Rank
Women's tournament	Spain; W 35–17	United States; W 24–21	Madagascar; L 5–19	2	Australia; L 10–19	Madagascar; L 10–26	4

Roster

- Róza Bednářová
- Eliška Černá
- Emma Jaďuďová
- Klára Jakovcová
- Terezie Kurková
- Anna Laštovková
- Edita Jasmína Nejezchlebová
- Ema Marie Novotná
- Tereza Oličová
- Zuzana Paloučková
- Zuzana Švábová
- Sofie Treu

== Sailing ==
Czech Republic entered one male athlete.

Athlete	Event	Opening Series – Points per Race															Total points	Net points	Rank
Athlete	Event	1	2	3	4	5	6	7	8	9	10	11	12	13	14	15	Total points	Net points	Rank
Jakub Roušal	Men's windsurfing	16	14	17	~~19~~; STP	17	10	15	9	14	~~25~~; OCS	16	10	~~19~~	17	CAN	218	155	16

== Skateboarding ==
Czech Republic entered one female athlete based on available quotas.

Athlete	Event	Prelims							Final							
Athlete	Event	Run 1	Run 2	Trick 1	Trick 2	Trick 3	Total	Rank	Run 1	Run 2	Run 3	Trick 1	Trick 2	Trick 3	Total	Rank
Laura Žáčková	Women's street	~~24.61~~	39.65	~~0.00~~	74.23	~~0.00~~	113.88	5	42.79	~~22.12~~	~~33.80~~	0.00	~~0.00~~	~~0.00~~	42.79	6

== Swimming ==
Czech Republic entered two swimmers, one male and one female.

Athlete	Event	Heat		Final	
Athlete	Event	Time	Rank	Time	Rank
Zdeněk Procházka	50 m freestyle	22.65	1	22.54	1st place, gold medalist(s)
Zdeněk Procházka	100 m freestyle	50.81	3	50.54	4
Zdeněk Procházka	100 m butterfly	56.38	8	55.69	7
Gabriela Urbanová	50 m backstroke	30.82	17	DNQ	
Gabriela Urbanová	100 m backstroke	1:08.71	18	DNQ	

== Table tennis ==
Czech Republic entered one athlete.

Athlete	Event	Preliminary stage				Round of 16	Quarterfinals	Semifinals	Final / BM	
Athlete	Event	Opposition Result	Opposition Result	Opposition Result	Rank	Opposition Result	Opposition Result	Opposition Result	Opposition Result	Rank
Hanka Kodet	Women's singles	Ojo (NGR); W 3–1	Su (HKG); L 0–3	Elbadawy (EGY); W 3–0	2	Itagaki (GER); L 2–4	did not qualify			

== Taekwondo ==
Czech Republic entered one male and one female athlete.

Athlete	Event	Round of 16	Quarterfinals	Semifinals	Final / BM	
Athlete	Event	Opposition Result	Opposition Result	Opposition Result	Opposition Result	Rank
Josef Rýva	–73 kg	Djebbi (TUN); L 0–2	did not advance			
Alice Bínová	+63 kg	Niakou (GRE); W 2–0	Castellanos Vides (HON); W 2–0	Benyoub (FRA); W 2–0	Zećirović (SRB); L 0–2	2nd place, silver medalist(s)

== Triathlon ==
Czech Republic entered one male athlete.

Athlete	Event	Time						Rank
Athlete	Event	Swim (750m)	Trans 1	Bike (20km)	Trans 2	Run (5km)	Total	Rank
Ondřej Plic	Men's individual	8:31 (10)	0:23; 8:54 (10)	28:13 (11); 37:07 (2)	0:23; 37:30 (4)	16:39 (9)	54:09	7
