= Democratic Republic of the Congo at the 2026 Summer Youth Olympics =

- Flag of the Democratic Republic of the Congo
- IOC code: COD
- NOC: Comité Olympique Congolais

in Dakar, Senegal October 31, 2026 – November 13, 2026
- Competitors: 8 in 7 sports
- Flag bearers: Stephie Tsimba Manzanza & Mutendi Nzazi
- Medals: Gold 0 Silver 0 Bronze 1 Total 1

Summer Youth Olympics appearances
- 2010; 2014; 2018; 2026

The Democratic Republic of the Congo is scheduled to compete at the 2026 Summer Youth Olympics in Dakar, Senegal from October 31 to November 13, 2026. This will mark Democratic Republic of the Congo's fourth appearance at the Youth Olympics, after making its debut in 2010.

Beach wrestler Stephie Tsimba Manzanza and beach volleyball player Mutendi Nzazi served as the flag bearers for the opening ceremony.

== Competitors ==
The following is the list of number of competitors participating at the Games per sport/discipline.

Sport	Men	Women	Total
Athletics	1	0	1
Beach volleyball	2	0	2
Beach wrestling	0	1	1
Fencing	1	0	1
Road cycling	0	1	1
Swimming	1	0	1
Taekwondo	1	0	1
Total	6	2	8

== Athletics ==
Democratic Republic of the Congo entered one male athlete

=== Track and road events ===
Men

Athlete	Event	Semifinal		Final	
Athlete	Event	Result	Rank	Result	Rank
Chadrack Vungu Kayembe	400 m				

== Beach volleyball ==
Democratic Republic of the Congo received a quota place for the men's tournament.

Athletes	Event	Preliminary round				Round of 16	Quarterfinal	Semifinal	Final	
Athletes	Event	Opposition Score	Opposition Score	Opposition Score	Rank	Opposition Score	Opposition Score	Opposition Score	Opposition Score	Rank
Jonathan Mulapwa; Nzazi Mutendi	Men's	Amir / Amin (IRI); L 1–2	Hohenauer / Poinstingl (AUT); L 0–2	Simpson / Pomian (CAY); W 2–0	3 Q	Edgar / Turner (AUS); L 0–2	Did not advance			

== Beach wrestling ==
Democratic Republic of the Congo entered one female athlete.

Athlete	Event	Group Stage				Semifinal	Final / BM	
Athlete	Event	Opposition Result	Opposition Result	Opposition Result	Rank	Opposition Result	Opposition Result	Rank
Stephie Tsimba Manzanza	Women's –55 kg							

== Fencing ==
Democratic Republic of the Congo entered one male athlete.

Athlete	Event	Pool Round	Seed	Round of 16	Quarterfinals	Semifinals	Final / BM	Rank
Athlete	Event	Opposition Score	Seed	Opposition Score	Opposition Score	Opposition Score	Opposition Score	Rank
Tulunga Mervie Yembele	Men's sabre							

== Road cycling ==
Democratic Republic of the Congo entered one male athlete.

Men

Athlete	Event	Time	Rank
Charly Maliabo Yamboyi	Men's individual road race		
Charly Maliabo Yamboyi	Men's road time trial		

== Swimming ==
Democratic Republic of the Congo entered one male swimmer.

Athlete	Event	Heats		Final	
Athlete	Event	Time	Rank	Time	Rank
Jehu Matondo	Men's 50 m freestyle	26.58	42	Did not advance	
Jehu Matondo	Men's 100 m freestyle	1:00.76	66	Did not advance	
Jehu Matondo	Men's 50 m backstroke				
Jehu Matondo	Men's 50 m butterfly	28.89	34	Did not advance	

== Taekwondo ==
Democratic Republic of the Congo entered one male athlete.

Athlete	Event	Round of 16	Quarterfinals	Semifinals	Final	
Athlete	Event	Opposition Result	Opposition Result	Opposition Result	Opposition Result	Rank
Obed Kilolo	Men's +73 kg					
