= Algeria at the 2026 Summer Youth Olympics =

- Flag of Algeria
- IOC code: ALG
- NOC: Algerian Olympic Committee
- Website: www.coa.dz

in Dakar, Senegal October 31, 2026 – November 13, 2026
- Competitors: 41 in 17 sports
- Flag bearers: Tania Morice & Younes Mohamed Y Ferradj
- Medals: Gold 0 Silver 1 Bronze 1 Total 2

Summer Youth Olympics appearances (overview)
- 2010; 2014; 2018; 2026

Algeria is scheduled to compete at the 2026 Summer Youth Olympics in Dakar, Senegal from October 31 to November 13, 2026. This will mark Algeria's fourth appearance at the Youth Olympics, after making its debut in 2010.

Table tennis player Tania Morice and equestrian Younes Mohamed Y Ferradj served as the flag bearers for the opening ceremony.

== Competitors ==
The following is the list of number of competitors participating at the Games per sport/discipline.

Sport	Men	Women	Total
3x3 basketball	4	0	4
Archery	1	1	2
Artistic gymnastics	1	1	2
Athletics	3	3	6
Badminton	1	1	2
Beach wrestling	2	2	4
Boxing	1	4	5
Coastal rowing	0	1	1
Equestrian	1	0	1
Fencing	1	0	1
Judo	0	1	1
Road cycling	1	1	2
Sailing	1	1	2
Swimming	2	2	4
Table tennis	1	1	2
Triathlon	0	1	1
Wushu	0	1	1
Total	20	21	41

== 3x3 basketball ==
Algeria entered a team for the boys' tournament as one of the three participating teams from Africa.

Summary

Event	Pool play			Quarterfinal	Semifinal	Final / BM	
Event	Opposition Score	Opposition Score	Group Rank	Opposition Score	Opposition Score	Opposition Score	Rank
Boys' tournament	Senegal; L 13-16	Lithuania; L 13-17	3	did not advance			10

Roster

- Ibrahimelkhalil Benamara
- Redouane Bertouche
- Anes Hadjoudj
- Abdelkarim Yahiaoui

== Archery ==
Algeria entered two archers, one of each gender.

Athlete	Event	Ranking round		Round of 32	Round of 16	Quarterfinals	Semifinals	Final / BM	
Athlete	Event	Score	Seed	Opposition Score	Opposition Score	Opposition Score	Opposition Score	Opposition Score	Rank
Marouane Guendouzi	Men's individual								
Selma Bedriddine	Women's individual								
Marouane Guendouzi; Selma Bedriddine	Mixed team			—N/a					

== Artistic gymnastics ==
Algeria entered two gymnasts, one male and one female.

Men
Individual

Athlete	Event	Qualification								Final							
Athlete	Event	Apparatus						Total	Rank	Apparatus						Total	Rank
Athlete	Event	F	PH	R	V	PB	HB	Total	Rank	F	PH	R	V	PB	HB	Total	Rank
Ishak Bennila	All-around																

Girls
Individual

Athlete	Event	Qualification						Final					
Athlete	Event	Apparatus				Total	Rank	Apparatus				Total	Rank
Athlete	Event	V	UB	BB	F	Total	Rank	V	UB	BB	F	Total	Rank
Melissa Djadi	All-around												

Mixed
Mixed team

Athlete	Event	Round	Final						
Athlete	Event	Round	Apparatus					Total	Rank
Athlete	Event	Round	F	PB	HB	UB	BB	Total	Rank
Melissa Djadi	Mixed team	1		—N/a				—N/a	
Melissa Djadi	Mixed team	2		—N/a				—N/a	
Melissa Djadi	Mixed team	3		—N/a				—N/a	
Ishak Bennila	Mixed team	1				—N/a		—N/a	
Ishak Bennila	Mixed team	2				—N/a		—N/a	
Ishak Bennila	Mixed team	3				—N/a		—N/a	
Total	Mixed team	—N/a							

== Athletics ==
Algeria entered six athletes, three of each gender.

Track events

Athlete	Event	Semifinal		Final	
Athlete	Event	Result	Rank	Result	Rank
Abdallah Khabez	Men's 3000 m	—N/a			
Akram Sek	Men's 110 m hurdles				
Alissar Saadellah	Women's 100 m hurdles				

Field events

Athlete	Event	Final	
Athlete	Event	Result	Rank
Imad Eddine Khedim	Men's hammer throw		
Hala Khadidja Mefti	Women's triple jump		
Aya Amrane	Women's hammer throw		

== Badminton ==
Algeria entered two athletes, one male and one female.

Athlete	Event	Group stage				Quarter-final	Semi-final	Final / BM	
Athlete	Event	Opposition Score	Opposition Score	Opposition Score	Rank	Opposition Score	Opposition Score	Opposition Score	Rank
Oussama Keddou	Men's singles	Bredell (RSA); W (21–17, 21–10)	Ceyhan (TUR); L (21–23, 19–21)	Chuang (TPE); L (14–21, 12–21)	3	Did not advance			
Chiraz Halimi	Women's singles	Kakanik (THA); L (7–21, 5–21)	Nguyễn (VIE); L (7–21, 13–21)	Robati (IRI); L (11–21, 12–21)	4	Did not advance			

== Beach wrestling ==
Algeria entered four athletes, two of each gender.

Athlete	Event	Group Stage				Semifinal	Final / BM	
Athlete	Event	Opposition Result	Opposition Result	Opposition Result	Rank	Opposition Result	Opposition Result	Rank
Yasser Kraled Kebir	Men's –80 kg							
Ali Sadeki	Men's –90 kg							
Meryem Safiya Grib	Women's –45 kg							
Ikram Bali	Women's –55 kg							

== Boxing ==
Algeria entered with 5 competitors, 1 boy and 4 girls.

Athlete	Event	Round of 16	Quarterfinals	Semifinals	Final	
Athlete	Event	Opposition Result	Opposition Result	Opposition Result	Opposition Result	Rank
Bilal Lezoul	Men's welterweight					
Bouthaina Bensalah	Women's light flyweight					
Cerine Kessal	Women's flyweight					
Besma Bahri	Women's featherweight					
Meriem Sari	Women's lightweight					

== Coastal rowing ==
Algeria entered one female rower.

Athlete	Event	Qualification		Round of 16	Quarterfinal	Semifinal	Final	
Athlete	Event	Time	Rank	Opposition Time	Opposition Time	Opposition Time	Opposition Time	Rank
Ghizlene Besma Bennacer	Women's single sculls	3:05.70	22	Did not advance				

== Equestrian ==
Algeria received a quota place as one of the four invited NOCs from Africa.

Athlete	Horse	Event	Qualification					Final	
Athlete	Horse	Event	Round 1		Round 2			Final	
Athlete	Horse	Event	Penalties	Rank	Penalties	Total	Rank	Penalties	Rank
Younes Mohamed Ferradj	Decibelle Tardonne	Individual jumping	10	15	0	10	8 Q		

== Fencing ==
Algeria entered one female fencer.

Athlete	Event	Pool Round	Seed	Round of 16	Quarterfinals	Semifinals	Final / BM	Rank
Athlete	Event	Opposition Score	Seed	Opposition Score	Opposition Score	Opposition Score	Opposition Score	Rank
Ziad Abdelah Benabed	Men's foil							

== Judo ==
Algeria entered one female judoka based on the available quotas assigned by the International Judo Federation.

Athlete	Event	Round of 16	Quarterfinals	Semifinals	Repechage 1	Repechage 2	Final	
Athlete	Event	Opposition Result	Opposition Result	Opposition Result	Opposition Result	Opposition Result	Opposition Result	Rank
Dounia Berrahoual	Women's –63 kg	Mtukula (MAW); W 101–0	Ben Sliman (TUN); W 10–0	Darjada (IND); L 2–100	—N/a		Fatimah (INA); L 1–10	5

== Road cycling ==
Algeria entered two athletes, one male and one female.

Athlete	Event	Time	Rank
Selmane Mansouri	Men's road race		
Selmane Mansouri	Men's road time trial		
Hadjer Bousba	Women's road race		
Hadjer Bousba	Women's road time trial		

== Sailing ==
Algeria entered two athletes, one male and one female.

Athlete	Event	Race															Net points	Final rank
Athlete	Event	1	2	3	4	5	6	7	8	9	10	11	12	13	14	15	Net points	Final rank
Youcef Guebli	Men's Techno 293+																	
Thinhinane Bazizen	Women's Techno 293+																	

== Swimming ==
Algeria entered four swimmers, two of each gender.

Athlete	Event	Heats		Final	
Athlete	Event	Time	Rank	Time	Rank
Houd Abed	Men's 100 m backstroke	58.73	8 Q	58.09	7
Houd Abed	Men's 200 m backstroke	2:06.71	5 Q	2:07.51	5
Salah Eddine Torki	Men's 50 m freestyle	23.89	10	Did not advance	
Salah Eddine Torki	Men's 100 m freestyle	51.20	5 Q	51.45	8
Salah Eddine Torki	Men's 100 m butterfly	55.97	5 Q	56.12	8
Rahma Benmahammed	Women's 100 m breaststroke	1:17.81	14	Did not advance	
Rahma Benmahammed	Women's 200 m breaststroke	2:48.15	8 Q	2:44.23	5
Kamelia Mezzaour	Women's 50 m breaststroke	37.89	26	Did not advance	

== Table tennis ==
Algeria entered two athletes, one male and one female.

Athlete	Event	Group Stage				Round of 32	Round of 16	Quarterfinal	Semifinal	Final	
Athlete	Event	Opposition Result	Opposition Result	Opposition Result	Rank	Opposition Result	Opposition Result	Opposition Result	Opposition Result	Opposition Result	Rank
Aylan Goudjil	Men's singles	Öçal (TUR); L 0–3	Rinderer (GER); L 1–3	Li (CHN); L 0–3	4	—N/a	Did not advance				
Tania Morice	Women's singles	Diallo (SEN); W 3–0	Yao (CHN); L 0–3	Ferrer (VEN); W 3–2	2 Q	—N/a	Su (HKG); L 1–4	Did not advance			
Aylan Goudjil; Tania Morice	Mixed doubles	—N/a				Villavicencio / Maldonado (ECU); W 3–1	Vegas / Ferrer (VEN); L 1–3	Did not advance			

== Triathlon ==
Algeria entered one female athlete.

Athlete	Event	Time						Rank
Athlete	Event	Swim (750 km)	Trans 1	Bike (20 km)	Trans 2	Run (5 km)	Total	Rank
Sarah Nardjes Berrached	Women's							

== Wushu ==
Algeria entered one female athlete after quotas were assigned by the International Wushu Federation.

Athlete	Event	Preliminary						Final					
Athlete	Event	Event 1		Event 2		Total		Event 1		Event 2		Total	
Athlete	Event	Result	Rank	Result	Rank	Result	Rank	Result	Rank	Result	Rank	Result	Rank
Maria Warda Alioua	Women's changquan	8.123	8	8.376	7	16.499	8 Q	8.193	8	8.843	5	17.036	7
