= Iran at the 2026 Summer Youth Olympics =

- IOC code: IRI
- NOC: National Olympic Committee of the Islamic Republic of Iran

in Dakar 31 October – 13 November 2026
- Competitors: 29 in 14 sports
- Flag bearers: Benyamin Faraji; Hadis Yari
- Medals Ranked 38th: Gold 1 Silver 4 Bronze 3 Total 8

Summer Youth Olympics appearances (overview)
- 2010; 2014; 2018; 2026

Iran participated at the 2026 Summer Youth Olympics in Dakar, Senegal from October 31 to November 13, 2026. This marked Iran's fourth appearance at the Youth Olympics, after making its debut in 2010.

Futsal player Hadis Yari and table tennis player Benyamin Faraji served as the flag bearers for the opening ceremony.

== Competitors ==
Sport	Boys	Girls	Total
Athletics	1		1
Badminton	1	1	2
Beach volleyball	2		2
Beach wrestling	4		4
Boxing		1	1
Cycling	1		1
Fencing		1	1
Futsal		10	10
Judo	1		1
Swimming	1		1
Table tennis	1		1
Taekwondo	1	1	2
Triathlon	1		1
Wushu	1		1
Total	15	14	29

== Medal summary ==
=== Medals by sport ===
Sport	Gold	Silver	Bronze	Total
Beach wrestling		1	1	2
Futsal			1	1
Judo		1		1
Swimming		1		1
Taekwondo	1	1		2
Wushu			1	1
Total	1	4	3	8

=== Medalists ===
Medal	Name	Sport	Event
Gold	Benyamin Soltanian	Taekwondo	Boys' +73 kg
Silver	Amir Ali Domirkolaei	Beach wrestling	Boys' 60 kg
Silver	Sobhan Hakimi	Judo	Boys' 81 kg
Silver	Parsa Shahshahani	Swimming	Boys' 200 m backstroke
Silver	Asal Goltappeh	Taekwondo	Girls' 63 kg
Bronze	Reza Jalilian	Beach wrestling	Boys' 80 kg
Bronze	Fatemeh Shokrani; Melina Nikbakht; Nafiseh Mohammadi; Niayesh Rahmani; Sarina Zare; Tannaz Bagheri; Hadis Yari; Setayesh Rezaei; Elnaz Hosseinipour; Narges Amirmohseni	Futsal	Girls
Bronze	Arash Pahali	Wushu	Boys' changquan combined

== Results by event ==
=== Athletics ===
Athlete	Event	Time	Rank
Mohammad Alidousti	Boys' 2000 m steeplechase	6:26.60	12

=== Badminton ===
Athlete	Event	Preliminary round				Quarterfinal	Semifinal	Final	Rank
Athlete	Event	Round 1	Round 2	Round 3	Rank	Quarterfinal	Semifinal	Final	Rank
Amir Ali Ahmadloo	Boys' singles	Adu-Mintah (GHA); W 2–0 (21–9, 21–8)	Douce (MRI); W 2–0 (21–8, 21–19)	Rasamsetti (USA); L 0–2 (19–21, 19–21)	2	Did not advance			9
Zahra Robati	Girls' singles	Nguyễn (VIE); L 0–2 (14–21, 15–21)	Kakanik (THA); L 0–2 (14–21, 9–21)	Halimi (ALG); W 2–0 (21–11, 21–12)	3	Did not advance			17

=== Beach volleyball ===
Athlete	Event	Preliminary round				Round of 32	Round of 16	Quarterfinal	Semifinal	Final	Rank
Athlete	Event	Round 1	Round 2	Round 3	Rank	Round of 32	Round of 16	Quarterfinal	Semifinal	Final	Rank
Amir Reza Jamshidi; Amin Vakili	Boys	Mulapwa and Mutendi (COD); W 2–1 (21–14, 17–21, 15–7)	Simpson and Pomian (CAY); W 2–0 (21–6, 21–5)	Hohenauer and Poinstingl (AUT); L 1–2 (11–21, 21–19, 12–15)	2 Q	Bye	Sagynysh and Agabek (KAZ); W 2–1 (19–21, 21–12, 15–13)	Hüper and Wüst (GER); L 0–2 (16–21, 17–21)	Did not advance		5

=== Beach wrestling ===
Athlete	Event	Group round				Semifinal	Final	Rank
Athlete	Event	Round 1	Round 2	Round 3	Rank	Semifinal	Final	Rank
Amir Ali Domirkolaei	Boys' 60 kg	Conde (POR); W 3–0	Phạm (VIE); W WO	Abu Fare (JOR); W 3–1	1 Q	Mdzevashvili (GEO); W 3–0	Rodríguez (VEN); L 0–3	2nd place, silver medalist(s)
Kiarash Torabi	Boys' 70 kg	Anuj (IND); W 3–0	Sarr (SEN); W 2–1	Hafez (EGY); W 3–0	1 Q	Makharadze (GEO); L 0–3	3rd place match Kuzmenko (UKR); L 2–4	4
Reza Jalilian	Boys' 80 kg	Mourtzilakis (GRE); L Fall (2–4)	Acevedo (PUR); W 3–1	Moffa (ITA); W Fall (5–0)	2 Q	Diop (SEN); L 2–4	3rd place match Mourtzilakis (GRE); W 4–2	3rd place, bronze medalist(s)
Amir Saleh Javidani	Boys' 90 kg	Malishevskyi (UKR); W 3–0	Sadeki (ALG); W 3–0	Mustafaev (GEO); L 0–4	2	Did not advance		5

=== Boxing ===
Athlete	Event	Round of 16	Quarterfinal	Semifinal	Final	Rank
Marin Golzadeh	Girls' 57 kg	Bye	Campos (BRA); L RSC	Did not advance		5

=== Cycling ===
Athlete	Event	Time	Rank
Amir Pouyan Koneshloo	Boys' road race	1:48:38	30
Amir Pouyan Koneshloo	Boys' individual time trial	11:37.44	24

=== Fencing ===
Athlete	Event	Pool round		Round of 16	Quarterfinal	Semifinal	Final	Rank
Athlete	Event	Results	Rank	Round of 16	Quarterfinal	Semifinal	Final	Rank
Ghazal Madani	Girls' épée	Lin (TPE) L 4–5; Fassassi (BEN) W 4–3; Mbaye (SEN) W 4–2; Al-Sharji (OMA) L 3–5; Aina (ITA) L 1–5; Sabonete (ANG) W 5–4	8 Q	Mbaye (SEN); W 15–5	Dmytruk (UKR); L 5–15	Did not advance		8

=== Futsal ===
Team	Event	Preliminary round				Semifinal	Final	Rank
Team	Event	Round 1	Round 2	Round 3	Rank	Semifinal	Final	Rank
Iran	Girls	Costa Rica; W 3–0	Cameroon; W 5–3	Italy; W 3–1	1 Q	Venezuela; L 2–3	3rd place match Italy; W 5–2	3rd place, bronze medalist(s)
Roster: Fatemeh Shokrani; Melina Nikbakht; Nafiseh Mohammadi; Niayesh Rahmani; Sarina Zare; Tannaz Bagheri; Hadis Yari; Setayesh Rezaei; Elnaz Hosseinipour; Narges Amirmohseni; Coach: Fatemeh Sharif

=== Judo ===
Athlete	Event	Round of 16	Quarterfinal	Semifinal	Repechage	Final	Rank
Sobhan Hakimi	Boys' 81 kg	Bye	Kargbo (SLE); W 100–000	El-Ramly (EGY); W 110–001	Bye	Čebulj (SLO); L 000–001	2nd place, silver medalist(s)

=== Swimming ===
Athlete	Event	Heats		Final	
Athlete	Event	Time	Rank	Time	Rank
Parsa Shahshahani	Boys' 50 m backstroke	26.96	6 Q	26.91	7
Parsa Shahshahani	Boys' 100 m backstroke	57.83	6 Q	57.88	6
Parsa Shahshahani	Boys' 200 m backstroke	2:03.68	2 Q	2:02.74	2nd place, silver medalist(s)

=== Table tennis ===
Athlete	Event	Preliminary round				Round of 16	Quarterfinal	Semifinal	Final	Rank
Athlete	Event	Round 1	Round 2	Round 3	Rank	Round of 16	Quarterfinal	Semifinal	Final	Rank
Benyamin Faraji	Boys' singles	El-Sayed (EGY); W 3–0 (5, 7, 7)	Preechayan (THA); W 3–0 (8, 7, 2)	Villavicencio (ECU); W 3–0 (2, 4, 8)	1 Q	Lin (TPE); L 3–4 (6, 9, −12, −3, 3, −10, −9)	Did not advance			9

=== Taekwondo ===
Athlete	Event	Round of 16	Quarterfinal	Semifinal	Final	Rank
Benyamin Soltanian	Boys' +73 kg	Bye	Vladimirov (BUL); W 2–0 (10–0, 3–2)	Jang (KOR); W 2–0 (13–11, 9–8)	Lysenko (ESP); W 2–0 (15–8, 4–4)	1st place, gold medalist(s)
Asal Goltappeh	Girls' 63 kg	Kaabi (KSA); W 2–0 (13–0, 6–3)	Busila (JOR); W 2–0 (3–2, 6–6)	Touré (SEN); W 2–0 (8–7, 5–1)	Fellinger (GER); L 0–2 (2–7, 0–0)	2nd place, silver medalist(s)

=== Triathlon ===
Athlete	Event	Time	Rank
Ali Asghar Keshavarzian	Boys' sprint	56:12	18

=== Wushu ===
Athlete	Event	Preliminary				Final			
Athlete	Event	Changquan	Gunshu	Total	Rank	Changquan	Gunshu	Total	Rank
Arash Pahali	Boys' changquan combined	9.133	9.093	18.226	5 Q	9.310	9.293	18.603	3rd place, bronze medalist(s)
