= Road cycling at the 2026 Summer Youth Olympics =

Cycling at the IV Summer Youth Olympic Games
- Venue: Route de la Corniche Ouest
- Dates: 8–10 November
- No. of events: 4 (2 boys, 2 girls)
- Competitors: 83 (41 boys and 42 girls) from 57 nations

Road cycling at the 2026 Summer Youth Olympics was held from 8 to 10 November. The events took place on the Route de la Corniche Ouest in Dakar, Senegal. Compared to the previous editions, the BMX-races as well as the Combined Team Event were removed from the program.

== Qualification ==
The allocation of the quota places was published on 5 May 2026 by the Union Cycliste Internationale. There were 84 quota places available in total, 42 per gender. Each athlete will participate both in the time trial event as well as the road race. Senegal as host is the only country with two quota places per gender.

Region	NOC	Boys	Girls
Africa	Algeria	Yes	Yes
Africa	Angola	Yes	No
Africa	~~Egypt~~	~~WD~~	No
Africa	Ethiopia	Yes	Yes
Africa	Democratic Republic of the Congo	No	Yes
Africa	Eritrea	Yes	Yes
Africa	Kenya	Yes	No
Africa	Mauritius	Yes	No
Africa	Morocco	Yes	No
Africa	Namibia	Yes	Yes
Africa	Nigeria	No	Yes
Africa	Rwanda	Yes	Yes
Africa	Senegal	Yes	Yes
Africa	Senegal	Yes	Yes
Africa	South Africa	Yes	Yes
Africa	Tunisia	Yes	No
Africa	Uganda	Yes	No
Africa	Zimbabwe	Yes	No
Americas	Argentina	No	Yes
Americas	Bolivia	Yes	No
Americas	Chile	No	Yes
Americas	Colombia	Yes	Yes
Americas	Costa Rica	Yes	Yes
Americas	Ecuador	No	Yes
Americas	Mexico	Yes	Yes
Americas	Paraguay	No	Yes
Americas	Peru	No	Yes
Americas	Venezuela	Yes	No
Asia	Chinese Taipei	No	Yes
Asia	Hong Kong	Yes	No
Asia	Indonesia	Yes	Yes
Asia	Iran	Yes	No
Asia	Japan	No	Yes
Asia	Kazakhstan	Yes	Yes
Asia	Mongolia	No	Yes
Asia	Philippines	No	Yes
Asia	Thailand	No	Yes
Asia	United Arab Emirates	Yes	No
Asia	Uzbekistan	No	Yes
Asia	Vietnam	No	Yes
Europe	Austria	Yes	Yes
Europe	Azerbaijan	Yes	No
Europe	Belgium	Yes	Yes
Europe	Bulgaria	Yes	No
Europe	Czech Republic	Yes	Yes
Europe	France	Yes	Yes
Europe	Greece	No	Yes
Europe	Hungary	Yes	No
Europe	Russia (Note: At the time the quota places were allocated, Russia was subject to IOC sanctions; consequently, the places were awarded to Individual Neutral Athletes.)	Yes	Yes
Europe	Italy	Yes	Yes
Europe	Latvia	Yes	No
Europe	Luxembourg	No	Yes
Europe	Norway	No	Yes
Europe	Poland	Yes	Yes
Europe	Slovakia	Yes	Yes
Europe	Slovenia	Yes	Yes
Europe	Spain	Yes	Yes
Europe	Ukraine	Yes	Yes
Oceania	Australia	Yes	Yes

== Medal summary ==
=== Medal table ===
* Host nation (Senegal)

Rank	Nation	Gold	Silver	Bronze	Total
1	Russia	1	1	1	3
2	Slovakia	1	1	0	2
3	Belgium	1	0	1	2
4	Kazakhstan	1	0	0	1
5	Australia	0	1	1	2
6	Italy	0	1	0	1
7	Czech Republic	0	0	1	1
Totals (7 entries)		4	4	4	12

=== Medalists ===
Event	Gold	Silver	Bronze
Men's road race	Daan Wilmsen; Belgium	Stepan Bortnik; Russia	Caleb McKenzie; Australia
Men's time trial	Timotej Michalík; Slovakia	Lorenzo Ceccarello; Italy	Daan Wilmsen; Belgium
Women's road race	Angelina Novolodskaya; Russia	Elsie Apps; Australia	Linda Sítková; Czech Republic
Women's time trial	Anel Tashbay; Kazakhstan	Karolína Hajduková; Slovakia	Angelina Novolodskaya; Russia
