= Marshall Islands at the 2026 Summer Youth Olympics =

- Flag of Marshall Islands
- IOC code: MHL
- NOC: Marshall Islands National Olympic Committee

in Dakar, Senegal 31 October – 13 November 2026
- Competitors: 1 in 1 sport
- Flag bearer: Jacob Hutchinson
- Medals: Gold 0 Silver 0 Bronze 0 Total 0

Summer Youth Olympics appearances
- 2010; 2014; 2018; 2026

Marshall Islands is scheduled to compete at the 2026 Summer Youth Olympics in Dakar, Senegal, from 31 October to 13 November 2026. This will be the nation's fourth appearance at the Summer Youth Olympic Games.

Swimmer Jacob Hutchinson served as the flag bearer for the opening ceremony.

== Competitors ==
The following is the list of number of competitors participating at the Games per sport/discipline.

| Sport | Men | Women | Total |
|---|---|---|---|
| Swimming | 1 | 0 | 1 |
| Total | 0 | 1 | 1 |

== Swimming ==
Marshall Islands qualified one male swimmer via universality place selection from World Aquatics.

| Athlete | Event | Heats | | Final | |
| Athlete | Event | Time | Rank | Time | Rank |
|---|---|---|---|---|---|
| Jacob Hutchinson | Men's 50 m freestyle | 29.93 | 52 | did not advance | did not advance |
| Jacob Hutchinson | Men's 100 m freestyle | 1:08.53 | 72 | did not advance | did not advance |
| Jacob Hutchinson | Men's 50 m breaststroke | DSQ | DSQ | did not advance | did not advance |
