= American Samoa at the 2026 Summer Youth Olympics =

- IOC code: ASA
- NOC: American Samoa National Olympic Committee

in Dakar, Senegal 31 October – 13 November 2026
- Competitors: 2 in 2 sports
- Flag bearers: Tupulua Vaouli & Ethan Lake
- Medals: Gold 0 Silver 0 Bronze 0 Total 0

Summer Youth Olympics appearances
- 2010; 2014; 2018; 2026

American Samoa, recognized by the International Olympic Committee (IOC) and represented by the National Olympic Committee of American Samoa (ASANOC), is scheduled to compete at the 2026 Summer Youth Olympics in Dakar, Senegal, from 31 October to 13 November 2026. This will mark American Samoa's fourth appearance at the Youth Olympics, after making its debut in 2010.

Rower Tupulua Vaouli and wrestler Ethan Lake served as the flag bearers for the opening ceremony.

== Competitors ==
The following is the list of number of competitors participating at the Games.

Sport	Men	Women	Total
Beach wrestling	1	0	1
Coastal rowing	0	1	1
Total	1	1	2

== Beach wrestling ==
American Samoa entered one male athlete.

Athlete	Event	Group Stage				Semifinal	Final / BM	
Athlete	Event	Opposition Result	Opposition Result	Opposition Result	Rank	Opposition Result	Opposition Result	Rank
Ethan Lake	Men's −90 kg							

== Coastal rowing ==
American Samoa entered one female rower.

Athlete	Event	Qualification		Round of 16	Quarterfinal	Semifinal	Final	
Athlete	Event	Time	Rank	Opposition Time	Opposition Time	Opposition Time	Opposition Time	Rank
Tupulua Vaouli	Women's solo	3:30.06	27	Did not advance				27
