= Vietnam at the 2026 Summer Youth Olympics =

- IOC code: VIE
- NOC: Vietnam Olympic Committee

in Dakar, Senegal 31 October – 13 November 2026
- Competitors: 10 in 7 sports
- Flag bearers: Nguyễn Thị Thu Huyền & Dương Văn Hoàng Quy
- Medals: Gold 0 Silver 1 Bronze 0 Total 1

Summer Youth Olympics appearances
- 2010; 2014; 2018; 2026

Vietnam is scheduled to compete at the 2026 Summer Youth Olympics in Dakar, Senegal from October 31 to November 13, 2026. This will mark Vietnam's fourth appearance at the Youth Olympics, after making its debut in 2010.

Badminton player Nguyễn Thị Thu Huyền and swimmer Dương Văn Hoàng Quy served as the flag bearers for the opening ceremony.

== Competitors ==
The following is the list of number of competitors participating at the Games per sport/discipline.

Sport	Men	Women	Total
Athletics	0	1	1
Badminton	0	1	1
Beach wrestling	2	1	3
Road cycling	0	1	1
Swimming	1	1	2
Taekwondo	1	0	1
Wushu	1	0	1
Total	5	5	10

== Athletics ==
Vietnam entered one female athlete.

=== Track & road events ===
Women

Athlete	Event	Heat		Semifinal		Final	
Athlete	Event	Result	Rank	Result	Rank	Result	Rank
Đồng Thị Hường	400 m						

== Badminton ==
Vietnam entered one female athlete.

Athlete	Event	Round of 16	Quarterfinals	Semifinals	Final / BM	
Athlete	Event	Opposition Result	Opposition Result	Opposition Result	Opposition Result	Rank
Nguyễn Thị Thu Huyền	Women's singles	Robati (IRI); W 2–0	Halimi (ALG)	Kakanik (THA)		

== Beach wrestling ==
Vietnam entered three athletes, two male and one female.

Athlete	Event	Group Stage				Semifinal	Final / BM	
Athlete	Event	Opposition Result	Opposition Result	Opposition Result	Rank	Opposition Result	Opposition Result	Rank
Phạm Văn Dương	Men's –60 kg							
Hà Lý Quý Bảo	Men's –90 kg							
Lò Thị Hồng	Women's –45 kg							

== Road cycling ==
Vietnam entered one female athlete.

Women

Athlete	Event	Time	Rank
Nguyễn Khang Hà My	Road race		
Nguyễn Khang Hà My	Time trial		

== Swimming ==
Vietnam entered two swimmers, one male and one female.

Athlete	Event	Heat		Semifinal		Final	
Athlete	Event	Time	Rank	Time	Rank	Time	Rank
Dương Văn Hoàng Quy	50 m butterlfy						
Dương Văn Hoàng Quy	100 m butterlfy						
Dương Văn Hoàng Quy	200 m butterlfy						
Nguyễn Thúy Hiền	50 m freestyle						
Nguyễn Thúy Hiền	100 m freestyle						
Nguyễn Thúy Hiền	50 m breaststroke						
Nguyễn Thúy Hiền	100 m breaststroke						

== Taekwondo ==
Vietnam entered one male athlete.

Men

Athlete	Event	Round of 16	Quarterfinals	Semifinals	Repechage	Final / BM	
Athlete	Event	Opposition Result	Opposition Result	Opposition Result	Opposition Result	Opposition Result	Rank
Nguyễn Trương Nhật Huy	–55 kg						

== Wushu ==
Vietnam entered one male athlete after quotas were assigned by the International Wushu Federation.

Athlete	Event	Taijishan routine		Taijiquan routine		Total Points	Final Rank
Athlete	Event	Points	Rank	Points	Rank	Total Points	Final Rank
Nguyễn Khắc Lê Hoàng	Men's taijiquan combined	9.346	3	9.346	2	18.692	2nd place, silver medalist(s)
