= Angola at the 2026 Summer Youth Olympics =

- Flag of Angola
- IOC code: ANG
- NOC: Angolan Olympic Committee
- Website: www.comiteolimpicoangolano.com/pt

in Dakar, Senegal October 31, 2026 – November 13, 2026
- Competitors: 9 in 5 sports
- Flag bearers: Rhanya Daniela Santo & Agostinho João
- Medals: Gold 0 Silver 0 Bronze 0 Total 0

Summer Youth Olympics appearances
- 2010; 2014; 2018; 2026

Angola is scheduled to compete at the 2026 Summer Youth Olympics in Dakar, Senegal from October 31 to November 13, 2026. This will mark Angola's fourth appearance at the Youth Olympics, after making its debut in 2010.

Swimmer Rhanya Daniela Santo and judoka Agostinho João served as the flag bearers for the opening ceremony.

== Competitors ==
The following is the list of number of competitors participating at the Games per sport/discipline.

Sport	Men	Women	Total
Beach wrestling	2	0	2
Fencing	0	1	1
Judo	1	0	1
Road cycling	1	0	1
Swimming	2	2	4
Total	6	3	9

== Beach wrestling ==
Angola entered two male athletes.

Athlete	Event	Group Stage				Semifinal	Final / BM	
Athlete	Event	Opposition Result	Opposition Result	Opposition Result	Rank	Opposition Result	Opposition Result	Rank
David Deus	Men's –60 kg							
Diasivi Renato	Men's–70 kg							

== Fencing ==
Angola entered one female athlete.

Athlete	Event	Pool Round	Seed	Round of 16	Quarterfinals	Semifinals	Final / BM	Rank
Athlete	Event	Opposition Score	Seed	Opposition Score	Opposition Score	Opposition Score	Opposition Score	Rank
Joana Sabonete	Women's épée							

== Judo ==
Angola entered one male judoka based on the available quotas assigned by the International Judo Federation.

Men

Athlete	Event	Round of 16	Quarterfinals	Semifinals	Repechage 1	Repechage 2	Final	
Athlete	Event	Opposition Result	Opposition Result	Opposition Result	Opposition Result	Opposition Result	Opposition Result	Rank
Agostinho João	–100 kg	Bye	Minoharintsoa (MAD); W 2–0	Babaičenko (LTU); L 0–100	—N/a		Arai (JPN); L 0–100	5

== Road cycling ==
Angola entered one male athlete.

Athlete	Event	Time	Rank
Mariano Lucamba	Men's road race		
Mariano Lucamba	Men's time trial		

== Swimming ==
Angola entered four swimmers, two of each gender.

Athlete	Event	Heat		Final	
Athlete	Event	Time	Rank	Time	Rank
Carlos Fernandes	Men's 50 m backstroke	30.09	25	Did not advance	
Carlos Fernandes	Men's 100 m backstroke	1:06.11	25	Did not advance	
Carlos Fernandes	Men's 50 m breaststroke	34.82	27	Did not advance	
Carlos Fernandes	Men's 100 m breaststroke	1:21.86	26	Did not advance	
Santiago Guimarães	Men's 50 m freestyle	25.01	25	Did not advance	
Santiago Guimarães	Men's 100 m freestyle	55.42	40	Did not advance	
Santiago Guimarães	Men's 200 m freestyle				
Santiago Guimarães	Men's 50 m butterfly	26.87	25	Did not advance	
Maria Parimbelli	Women's 50 m freestyle	29.04	41	Did not advance	
Maria Parimbelli	Women's 100 m freestyle	1:05.09	53	Did not advance	
Maria Parimbelli	Women's 50 m backstroke	34.29	37	Did not advance	
Maria Parimbelli	Women's 100 m backstroke	1:16.47	26	Did not advance	
Rhanya Santo	Women's 200 m freestyle				
Rhanya Santo	Women's 400 m freestyle	—N/a		4:50.24	15
