= Wushu at the 2026 Summer Youth Olympics =

Wushu competitions

Wushu at the IV Summer Youth Olympic Games
- Venue: Complexe Iba Mar Diop
- Dates: 1–3 November
- No. of events: 4 (2 boys, 2 girls)
- Competitors: 47 (24 boys and 23 girls) from 47 nations

Wushu at the 2026 Summer Youth Olympics was held from 1 to 3 November at the Dakar Expo Center in Diamniadio, Senegal. This marks the debut of the sport at the Youth Olympics. and any Olympic edition as a medaled event when it was held twice as an exhibition sport in 1936 and 2008.

== Qualification ==
=== Qualification summary ===
The allocation of the quota places was announced in October 2026 by the International Wushu Federation.

Boys'		Girls'	
Changquan Combined	Taijiquan Combined	Changquan Combined	Taijiquan Combined
Belgium	Hong Kong	Algeria	Benin
Chile	Italy	Argentina	Brunei
China	Japan	Egypt	Bulgaria
Djibouti	Latvia	France	Canada
Ethiopia	Malaysia	Gabon	Chinese Taipei
Indonesia	Morocco	Georgia	Germany
Iran	Senegal	India	~~Kenya~~
Niger	Switzerland	Mexico	Philippines
Rwanda	Turkey	Nepal	Senegal
Russia	Ukraine	New Zealand	Singapore
Sweden	United States	Portugal	Tunisia
South Korea	Vietnam	Venezuela	Uzbekistan

Kenya later declined their quota place.

== Medal summary ==
=== Medal table ===
* Host nation (Senegal)

Rank	Nation	Gold	Silver	Bronze	Total
1	China	1	0	0	1
1	Egypt	1	0	0	1
1	Hong Kong	1	0	0	1
1	Singapore	1	0	0	1
5	Chinese Taipei	0	1	0	1
5	Indonesia	0	1	0	1
5	Venezuela	0	1	0	1
5	Vietnam	0	1	0	1
9	Germany	0	0	1	1
9	India	0	0	1	1
9	Iran	0	0	1	1
9	Japan	0	0	1	1
Totals (12 entries)		4	4	4	12

=== Medalists ===
Event	Gold	Silver	Bronze
Men's changquan combined	Lin Yilei; China	Asael Rondonuwu; Indonesia	Arash Pahali; Iran
Men's taijiquan combined	Poon Hao Ran; Hong Kong	Nguyễn Khắc Lê Hoàng; Vietnam	Shiki Kawamura; Japan
Women's changquan combined	Sondos Sonbol; Egypt	Valeria Dudamel; Venezuela	Lanchenbi Chanu Rajkumari; India
Women's taijiquan combined	Ng Zhe Nin; Singapore	Chu Yu-en; Chinese Taipei	Mia Zhuo; Germany
