= Fencing at the 2026 Summer Youth Olympics =

Fencing competitions

Fencing at the IV Summer Youth Olympic Games
- Venue: Dakar Expo Center
- Dates: 8–13 November
- No. of events: 6
- Competitors: 81 from 76 nations

Fencing at the 2026 Summer Youth Olympics was held from 8 to 13 November at the Dakar Expo Center in Diamniadio, Senegal.

== Qualification ==
=== Qualification summary ===
The following National Olympic Comitees received a quota place:

Men			Women		
Épée	Foil	Sabre	Épée	Foil	Sabre
Belgium	Algeria	Azerbaijan	Angola	Australia	Argentina
Canada	Belarus	Bulgaria	Benin	Austria	Bolivia
Colombia	Costa Rica	Democratic Republic of the Congo	Central African Republic	Bahrain	Brazil
Dominican Republic	Cyprus	Germany	Chinese Taipei	Egypt	Burkina Faso
Israel	Czech Republic	Georgia	Estonia	Jordan	Chile
Libya	Denmark	Iceland	Hungary	Malaysia	China
Mauritius	Great Britain	Iraq	Iran	Moldova	El Salvador
Panama	Hong Kong	Kazakhstan	Italy	Morocco	France
Romania	Japan	Kuwait	Ivory Coast	New Zealand	Guinea
Saudi Arabia	Lithuania	Senegal	Kenya	Poland	Honduras
Senegal	Mali	Singapore	Oman	Russia	Paraguay
Serbia	Qatar	Tunisia	Peru	Senegal	Senegal
Switzerland	Senegal	Turkey	Senegal	—N/a	South Korea
United Arab Emirates	Venezuela	—N/a	Ukraine	—N/a	Uzbekistan

== Medal summary ==
=== Medal table ===
* Host nation (Senegal)

Rank	Nation	Gold	Silver	Bronze	Total
1	Canada	1	0	0	1
1	China	1	0	0	1
1	Hong Kong	1	0	0	1
1	Hungary	1	0	0	1
1	Russia	1	0	0	1
1	Turkey	1	0	0	1
7	Egypt	0	1	0	1
7	Japan	0	1	0	1
7	Kazakhstan	0	1	0	1
7	Serbia	0	1	0	1
7	South Korea	0	1	0	1
7	Ukraine	0	1	0	1
13	Austria	0	0	1	1
13	Belgium	0	0	1	1
13	Cyprus	0	0	1	1
13	Italy	0	0	1	1
13	Singapore	0	0	1	1
13	Uzbekistan	0	0	1	1
Totals (18 entries)		6	6	6	18

=== Events ===
Event	Gold	Silver	Bronze
Men's épée	Simon Shan; Canada	Vukan Rađenović; Serbia	Wout Van Laecke; Belgium
Men's foil	Harris Ho; Hong Kong	Masashi Maeda; Japan	Aris Kiayias; Cyprus
Men's sabre	Candeniz Berrak; Turkey	Aibar Kaiym; Kazakhstan	Ashton Auw; Singapore
Women's épée	Lotti Horváth; Hungary	Alina Dmytruk; Ukraine	Francesca Aina; Italy
Women's foil	Uliana Belykh; Russia	Sara Amr Hossny; Egypt	Lena Mayerl; Austria
Women's sabre	Pan Qimiao; China	Jeon Yu-ju; South Korea	Nargiza Utebaeva; Uzbekistan
