= Beach wrestling at the 2026 Summer Youth Olympics – Men's 90 kg =

Men's 90 kg at the 2026 Summer Youth Olympics
- Venue: Saly Beach West, Senegal
- Date: 8 November 2026
- Competitors: 12 from 12 nations

Medalists
gold medal	Elgun Karimli	Azerbaijan
silver medal	Nuradin Mustafaev	Georgia
bronze medal	Ablaye Diouf	Senegal

The men's 90 kg competition in beach wrestling at the 2026 Summer Youth Olympics was held on 8 November 2026 at Saly Beach West in Saly, Senegal.

== Competition format ==
The 12 wrestlers were divided into three groups of four. Wrestlers competed in a round-robin format within their groups. The winner of each group and the best second-placed wrestler advanced to the semifinals. The semifinal winners competed for the gold medal, while the semifinal losers competed for the bronze medal.

== Schedule ==
All times are local (UTC).

Date	Event
8 November 2026	Group stage, semifinals and medal matches

== Results ==
=== Legend ===
- Q – Qualified for semifinals as group winner
- q – Qualified for semifinals as best second-placed wrestler

=== Results codes ===
Code	Meaning
VFA	Victory by a 3-point takedown or throw, without any point scored by the opponent
VSU	Victory with 3 points but without a 3-point takedown or throw, without any point scored by the opponent
VSU1	Victory with 3 points but without a 3-point takedown or throw, with point(s) scored by the opponent

=== Group stage ===
The group-stage results and standings were published in the official competition sheet.

==== Group A ====
Match	Wrestler	NOC	Technical points	Classification points	Result
113	Amirsaleh Javidaniyeganeh	Iran	3	2	VSU
113	Tymur Malishevskyi	Ukraine	0	0	VSU
114	Ali Sadeki	Algeria	0	0	VSU
114	Nuradin Mustafaev	Georgia	3	2	VSU
125	Amirsaleh Javidaniyeganeh	Iran	3	2	VSU
125	Ali Sadeki	Algeria	0	0	VSU
126	Tymur Malishevskyi	Ukraine	0	0	VSU
126	Nuradin Mustafaev	Georgia	3	2	VSU
161	Amirsaleh Javidaniyeganeh	Iran	0	0	VSU
161	Nuradin Mustafaev	Georgia	4	2	VSU
162	Tymur Malishevskyi	Ukraine	1	1	VSU1
162	Ali Sadeki	Algeria	3	2	VSU1

Rank	Wrestler	NOC	Matches won	Classification points	Technical points scored	Technical points conceded	Draw number	Qualification
1	Nuradin Mustafaev	Georgia	3	6	10	0	207	Q
2	Amirsaleh Javidaniyeganeh	Iran	2	4	6	4	15	
3	Ali Sadeki	Algeria	1	2	3	7	99	
4	Tymur Malishevskyi	Ukraine	0	1	1	9	95	

==== Group B ====
Match	Wrestler	NOC	Technical points	Classification points	Result
115	Allan Beserra	Brazil	3	2	VSU
115	Nour Ghannam	Morocco	0	0	VSU
116	Artiom Cacean	Moldova	0	0	VSU
116	Elgun Karimli	Azerbaijan	3	2	VSU
127	Allan Beserra	Brazil	3	2	VSU
127	Artiom Cacean	Moldova	0	0	VSU
128	Nour Ghannam	Morocco	0	0	VSU
128	Elgun Karimli	Azerbaijan	3	2	VSU
163	Allan Beserra	Brazil	0	0	VSU
163	Elgun Karimli	Azerbaijan	3	2	VSU
164	Nour Ghannam	Morocco	1	1	VSU1
164	Artiom Cacean	Moldova	4	2	VSU1

Rank	Wrestler	NOC	Matches won	Classification points	Technical points scored	Technical points conceded	Draw number	Qualification
1	Elgun Karimli	Azerbaijan	3	6	9	0	206	Q
2	Allan Beserra	Brazil	2	4	6	3	27	q
3	Artiom Cacean	Moldova	1	2	4	7	121	
4	Nour Ghannam	Morocco	0	1	1	10	92	

==== Group C ====
Match	Wrestler	NOC	Technical points	Classification points	Result
117	Ali Zaman	Bahrain	0	0	VSU
117	Ethan Lake	American Samoa	3	2	VSU
118	Ablaye Diouf	Senegal	3	2	VSU
118	Ly Quy Bao Ha	Vietnam	0	0	VSU
129	Ali Zaman	Bahrain	0	0	VFA
129	Ablaye Diouf	Senegal	3	4	VFA
130	Ethan Lake	American Samoa	1	1	VSU1
130	Ly Quy Bao Ha	Vietnam	3	2	VSU1
165	Ali Zaman	Bahrain	0	0	VSU
165	Ly Quy Bao Ha	Vietnam	3	2	VSU
166	Ethan Lake	American Samoa	0	0	VFA
166	Ablaye Diouf	Senegal	5	4	VFA

Rank	Wrestler	NOC	Matches won	Classification points	Technical points scored	Technical points conceded	Draw number	Qualification
1	Ablaye Diouf	Senegal	3	10	11	0	143	Q
2	Ly Quy Bao Ha	Vietnam	2	4	6	4	152	
3	Ethan Lake	American Samoa	1	3	4	8	71	
4	Ali Zaman	Bahrain	0	0	0	9	50	

=== Finals ===
The semifinals and medal matches were documented in the official competition brackets.

Semifinals
1	Nuradin Mustafaev (GEO)	3
4	Allan Beserra (BRA)	0
3	Elgun Karimli (AZE)	5
2	Ablaye Diouf (SEN)	0

Final
Nuradin Mustafaev (GEO)	1
Elgun Karimli (AZE)	3

Bronze-medal match
Ablaye Diouf (SEN)	4
Allan Beserra (BRA)	1

=== Final classification ===
The final classification was published in the official results report.

Rank	Wrestler	NOC
1	Elgun Karimli	Azerbaijan
2	Nuradin Mustafaev	Georgia
3	Ablaye Diouf	Senegal
4	Allan Beserra	Brazil
5	Amirsaleh Javidaniyeganeh	Iran
6	Ly Quy Bao Ha	Vietnam
7	Ethan Lake	American Samoa
8	Artiom Cacean	Moldova
9	Ali Sadeki	Algeria
10	Tymur Malishevskyi	Ukraine
11	Nour Ghannam	Morocco
12	Ali Zaman	Bahrain
