= Taekwondo at the 2026 Summer Youth Olympics – Men's +73 kg =

Men's +73 kg at the IV Summer Youth Olympic Games
- Venue: Complexe Iba Mar Diop
- Date: 11 November
- Competitors: 10 from 10 nations

Medalists
1st place, gold medalist(s)		Benyamin Soltanian	Iran
2nd place, silver medalist(s)		Iván Lysenko	Spain
3rd place, bronze medalist(s)		Bashir Adzhiev	Russia
3rd place, bronze medalist(s)		Jang Jun-won	South Korea

The men's' +73 kg competition at the 2026 Summer Youth Olympics was held on 11 October at the Complexe Iba Mar Diop.

== Schedule ==
All times are local (UTC+0).

Date	Time	Round
Wednesday, 11 November 2026	11:24; 12:36; 16:30; 18:00	Round of 16; Quarterfinals; Semifinals; Final

== Bracket ==
Round of 16
Claude Boulouchi (GAB)	1	0
Iván Lysenko (ESP)	16	12
Jang Jun-won (KOR)
Ozair Rashid (AFG)	DSQ

Quarterfinals
Bahdan Aliyeu (BLR)	2	0
Iván Lysenko (ESP)	17	15
Đorđe Živković (BIH)	7	2
Bashir Adzhiev (RUS)	20	19
Andi Vladimirov (BUL)	0	2
Benyamin Soltanian (IRI)	10	3
Jang Jun-won (KOR)	19	23
Obed Kilolo Nkalala (COD)	4	13

Semifinals
Iván Lysenko (ESP)	2	10	6
Bashir Adzhiev (RUS)	10	10	2;
Benyamin Soltanian (IRI)	13	9
Jang Jun-won (KOR)	11	8

Final
Iván Lysenko (ESP)	8	4
Benyamin Soltanian (IRI)	15	4
