= Beach wrestling at the 2026 Summer Youth Olympics =

Beach wrestling at the IV Summer Youth Olympic Games
- Venue: Saly Beach
- Dates: 7–8 November
- No. of events: 8
- Competitors: 96 from 52 nations

Beach wrestling at the 2026 Summer Youth Olympics was held from 7 to 8 November. The events took place at Saly Beach West.

== Qualification ==
=== Qualification summary ===
The following National Olympic Comitees received a quota place:

Boys'				Girls'			
-60 kg	-70 kg	-80 kg	-90 kg	-45 kg	-55 kg	-65 kg	-75 kg
Angola	Angola	Algeria	Algeria	Algeria	Algeria	Croatia	China
Ivory Coast	Azerbaijan	Azerbaijan	American Samoa	Bulgaria	Azerbaijan	Dominican Republic	Estonia
Georgia	Egypt	Georgia	Azerbaijan	Colombia	Democratic Republic of the Congo	Egypt	Germany
Greece	Georgia	Greece	Brazil	France	Ecuador	Spain	Greece
Iran	Hungary	India	Bahrain	Guinea-Bissau	Guinea	France	India
Jordan	India	Iran	Georgia	Honduras	Japan	India	Morocco
Namibia	Iran	Italy	Iran	Madagascar	Latvia	Kenya	Mexico
Portugal	Kenya	Morocco	Morocco	Mexico	Morocco	Moldova	South Africa
Senegal	New Zealand	Palau	Moldova	Puerto Rico	Nauru	Mongolia	Senegal
Ukraine	Puerto Rico	Puerto Rico	Senegal	Senegal	Peru	Senegal	Serbia
Venezuela	Senegal	Senegal	Ukraine	United States	Romania	Ukraine	United States
Vietnam	Ukraine	Ukraine	Vietnam	Vietnam	Senegal	United States	Venezuela

== Medal summary ==
=== Medal table ===
* Host nation (Senegal)

Rank	Nation	Gold	Silver	Bronze	Total
1	Senegal*	3	0	1	4
2	Azerbaijan	2	1	0	3
3	China	1	0	0	1
3	Dominican Republic	1	0	0	1
3	Venezuela	1	0	0	1
6	Georgia	0	2	1	3
7	Iran	0	1	1	2
8	India	0	1	0	1
8	Japan	0	1	0	1
8	Mexico	0	1	0	1
8	Spain	0	1	0	1
12	Colombia	0	0	1	1
12	Democratic Republic of the Congo	0	0	1	1
12	Mongolia	0	0	1	1
12	Ukraine	0	0	1	1
12	United States	0	0	1	1
Totals (16 entries)		8	8	8	24

=== Men's events ===
Event	Gold	Silver	Bronze
60 kg	Wilfredo Rodríguez; Venezuela	Amirali Domirkolaei; Iran	Davit Mdzevashvili; Georgia
70 kg	Tunar Guliyev; Azerbaijan	Luka Makharadze; Georgia	Mykyta Kuzmenko; Ukraine
80 kg	Maguette Diop; Senegal	Nihad Suleymanli; Azerbaijan	Reza Jalilian; Iran
90 kg	Elgun Karimli; Azerbaijan	Nuradin Mustafaev; Georgia	Ablaye Diouf; Senegal

=== Women's events ===
Event	Gold	Silver	Bronze
45 kg	Ndeye Anna Diatta; Senegal	Karen Ríos; Mexico	Valery Rubio; Colombia
55 kg	Elisabeth Ebedo Diatta; Senegal	Reisa Kojima; Japan	Stephie Tsimba Manzanza; Democratic Republic of the Congo
65 kg	Yolayni Rosado; Dominican Republic	Graciela Eningo; Spain	Erkhembaataryn Anujin; Mongolia
75 kg	Zhao Min; China	Taniya; India	Matilda Hruby; United States
