= Austria at the 2026 Summer Youth Olympics =

- Flag of Austria
- IOC code: AUT
- NOC: Austrian Olympic Committee
- Website: www.olympia.at

in Dakar, Senegal October 31, 2026 – November 13, 2026
- Competitors: 18 in 10 sports
- Medals: Gold 1 Silver 1 Bronze 1 Total 3

Summer Youth Olympics appearances (overview)
- 2010; 2014; 2018; 2026

Austria is competing at the 2026 Summer Youth Olympics in Dakar, Senegal, from 31 October to 13 November 2026. This is Austria's fourth appearance at the Youth Olympics, after making its debut in 2010.

== Medalists ==
Medal	Name	Sport	Event	Date
Gold	Paul Hohenauer; Martin Poinstingl	Beach volleyball	Boys' tournament	4 November
Silver	Alena Lux; Lukas Schönhuber	Coastal rowing	Mixed double sculls beach sprint	2 November
Bronze	Selina Wögerer	Judo	Girls' 78 kg	3 November

== Competitors ==
The following is the list of number of competitors participating at the Games per sport/discipline.

Sport	Boys	Girls	Total
Artistic gymnastics	1	1	2
Athletics	2	2	4
Beach volleyball	2	0	2
Coastal rowing	1	1	2
Fencing	0	1	1
Judo	0	1	1
Road cycling	1	1	2
Swimming	1	1	2
Table tennis	0	1	1
Triathlon	1	0	1
Total	9	9	18

== Artistic gymnastics ==
Boys

Athlete	Event	Points	Rank
Samuel Wachter	Boys' artistic individual all-around		

Girls

Athlete	Event	Points	Rank
Maria Stringl	Girls' artistic individual all-around		

== Athletics ==
Boys

Athlete	Event	Semi-final		Final	
Athlete	Event	Time	Rank	Time	Rank
Karem Ahmed	Men's 110 metres hurdles	14.07	10	Did not advance	
Zsombor Klucsik	Men's 400 metres hurdles	52.64	3 Q	51.59	3rd place, bronze medalist(s)

Girls

Athlete	Event	Semi-final		Final	
Athlete	Event	Time	Rank	Time	Rank
Fiona Schwarz	Women's 100 metres hurdles	14.12	4	13.76	4

Athlete	Event	Distance	Rank
Deborah Achleitner	Women's long jump	5.72	3rd place, bronze medalist(s)

== Beach volleyball ==
Boys

Athletes	Event	Groupstage				Round of 16		Quarterfinals		Semifinals		Final Bronze medal game	
Athletes	Event	Opposition	Score	Points	Rank	Opponent	Score	Opponent	Score	Opponent	Score	Opponent	Score
Hohenauer–Poinstingl	Men's tournament	Khalkiasari/Vakili (IRI)	W 2–1	6	1 Q	Dinarte/Kempf (NCA)	W 2–0	Arias/Farias (CHI)	W 2–0	Edgar/Turner (AUS)	W 2–0	Hüper/Wüst (GER)	W 2–1 (22–20, 13–21, 15–12)
Hohenauer–Poinstingl	Men's tournament	Mulapwa/Mutendi (COD)	W 2–0	6	1 Q	Dinarte/Kempf (NCA)	W 2–0	Arias/Farias (CHI)	W 2–0	Edgar/Turner (AUS)	W 2–0	Hüper/Wüst (GER)	W 2–1 (22–20, 13–21, 15–12)
Hohenauer–Poinstingl	Men's tournament	Pomian/Simpson (CAY)	W 2–0	6	1 Q	Dinarte/Kempf (NCA)	W 2–0	Arias/Farias (CHI)	W 2–0	Edgar/Turner (AUS)	W 2–0	Hüper/Wüst (GER)	W 2–1 (22–20, 13–21, 15–12)

== Coastal rowing ==
Boys

Athlete	Event	Time	Rank
Lukas Schönhuber	Boys' Solo C1x		13

Girls

Athlete	Event	Time	Rank
Alena Lux	Girls' Solo C1x		

Mixed

Athlete	Event	Time	Rank
Lukas Schönhuber; Alena Lux	Mixed Double Sculls C2x	2:28.95	Silver

== Fencing ==
Athlete	Event
Lena Meyerl	Girls' foil

== Judo ==
Athlete	Event	Rank
Selina Wögerer	Girls' 78 kg	Bronze

== Road cycling ==
Boys

Athlete	Event	Time	Rank
Matteo Zambelli	Boys' road race		
Matteo Zambelli	Boys' road time trial		

Girls

Athlete	Event	Time	Rank
Magdalena Kleinsaßer	Girls' road race		
Magdalena Kleinsaßer	Girls' road time trial		

== Swimming ==
Men

Athlete	Event	Heat		Final	
Athlete	Event	Time	Rank	Time	Rank
Giovanni Krismer	Men's 100 metre freestyle	53.60	26	DNQ	
Giovanni Krismer	Men's 200 metre freestyle	2:03.35	34	DNQ	
Giovanni Krismer	Men's 50 metre butterfly	25.34	8 Q	25.58	8
Giovanni Krismer	Men's 100 metre butterfly	57.08	11	DNQ	

Women

Athlete	Event	Heat		Final	
Athlete	Event	Time	Rank	Time	Rank
Lili Paier	Women's 50 metre breaststroke	33.74	7 Q	33.47	8
Lili Paier	Women's 100 metre breaststroke	1:12.71	5 Q	1:11.89	4
Lili Paier	Women's 200 metre breaststroke	2:35.43	4 Q	2:33.81	4
Lili Paier	Women's 100 metre butterfly	1:05.64	11	DNQ	

== Table tennis ==
Girls

Athlete	Event
Nina Skerbinz	Girls' singles

== Triathlon ==
Boys

Athlete	Event	Time						Rank
Athlete	Event	Swim (750 m)	Trans 1	Bike (20 km)	Trans 2	Run (5 km)	Total	Rank
Raphael Künz	Boys' sprint							
