= Namibia at the 2026 Summer Youth Olympics =

- Flag of Namibia
- IOC code: NAM
- NOC: Namibian National Olympic Committee
- Website: www.olympic.org.na

in Dakar, Senegal October 31, 2026 – November 13, 2026
- Competitors: 12 in 7 sports
- Flag bearers: Roselinda Matyayi & Shithigona Shipopyeni
- Medals: Gold 0 Silver 0 Bronze 0 Total 0

Summer Youth Olympics appearances
- 2010; 2014; 2018; 2026

Namibia competed at the 2026 Summer Youth Olympics in Dakar, Senegal from October 31 to November 13, 2026. This marked Namibia's fourth appearance at the Youth Olympics, after making its debut in 2010.

Swimmer Roselinda Matyayi and beach wrestler Shithigona Shipopyeni served as the flag bearers for the opening ceremony.

== Competitors ==
The following is the list of number of competitors participating at the Games per sport/discipline.

Sport	Men	Women	Total
Athletics	1	0	1
Beach volleyball	2	0	2
Beach wrestling	1	0	1
Boxing	1	0	1
Road cycling	1	1	2
Swimming	2	2	4
Triathlon	1	0	1
Total	9	3	12

== Athletics ==
Namibia entered one male athlete.

=== Track & road events ===
Men

Athlete	Event	Semifinal		Final	
Athlete	Event	Result	Rank	Result	Rank
Shikongo Iileka	100 m				

== Beach volleyball ==
Namibia received a quota place for the men's tournament.

Summary

Team	Event	Group stage				Round of 16	Quarterfinals	Semifinals	Final / BM	
Team	Event	Opposition Result	Opposition Result	Opposition Result	Rank	Opposition Result	Opposition Result	Opposition Result	Opposition Result	Rank
Robert Sinclair; Rene Steinkopff	Men's tournament									

== Beach wrestling ==
Namibia entered one male athlete.

Men

Team	Event	Group stage				Semifinals	Final / BM	
Team	Event	Opposition Result	Opposition Result	Opposition Result	Rank	Opposition Result	Opposition Result	Rank
Shithigona Shipopyeni	-60 kg							

== Boxing ==
Namibia entered one male athlete in the −50 kg category.

Men

Athlete	Weight	Round of 16	Quarterfinals	Semifinals	Final	
Athlete	Weight	Opposition Result	Opposition Result	Opposition Result	Opposition Result	Rank
Kalenga Abraham	–50 kg					

== Road cycling ==
Namibia entered two athletes, one of each gender.

Men

Athlete	Event	Time	Rank
Mike Baartman	Road race		
Mike Baartman	Time trial		

Women

Athlete	Event	Time	Rank
Bianca Nell	Road race		
Bianca Nell	Time trial		

== Swimming ==
Namibia entered four swimmers, two of each gender.

Men

Athlete	Event	Heat		Final	
Athlete	Event	Time	Rank	Time	Rank
Nathan Bock	100 m freestyle				
Nathan Bock	50 m breaststroke				
Nathan Bock	100 m breaststroke				
Nathan Bock	50 m butterfly				
Lorenzo Esterhuizen	50 m backstroke				
Lorenzo Esterhuizen	100 m backstroke				
Lorenzo Esterhuizen	100 m butterfly				
Lorenzo Esterhuizen	200 m butterfly				

Women

Athlete	Event	Heat		Final	
Athlete	Event	Time	Rank	Time	Rank
Madison Bergh	100 m freestyle				
Madison Bergh	200 m freestyle				
Madison Bergh	400 m freestyle				
Madison Bergh	800 m freestyle				
Roselinda Matyayi	50 m backstroke				
Roselinda Matyayi	100 m backstroke				
Roselinda Matyayi	200 m backstroke				
Roselinda Matyayi	50 m butterfly				

== Triathlon ==
Namibia entered one male athlete.

Athlete	Event	Time						Rank
Athlete	Event	Swim (750m)	Trans 1	Bike (20km)	Trans 2	Run (5km)	Total	Rank
Johannes Langford	Men's individual							
