= Morocco at the 2026 Summer Youth Olympics =

- Flag of Morocco
- IOC code: MAR
- NOC: Moroccan National Olympic Committee
- Website: cnom.org.ma

in Dakar, Senegal October 31, 2026 – November 13, 2026
- Competitors: 39 in 17 sports
- Flag bearers: Abir bouazzaoui & Ghali Bougja
- Medals: Gold 0 Silver 0 Bronze 0 Total 0

Summer Youth Olympics appearances (overview)
- 2010; 2014; 2018; 2026

Morocco is scheduled to compete at the 2026 Summer Youth Olympics in Dakar, Senegal from October 31 to November 13, 2026. This will mark Morocco's fourth appearance at the Youth Olympics, after making its debut in 2010.

The opening ceremony flag-bearers for Morocco were judoka Abir Bouazzaoui and equestrian Ghali Bougja.

== Competitors ==
The following is the list of number of competitors participating at the Games per sport/discipline.

Sport	Men	Women	Total
Artistic gymnastics	1	1	2
Athletics	1	4	5
Beach volleyball	2	0	2
Beach wrestling	2	2	4
Breaking	1	1	2
Boxing	0	2	2
Equestrian	1	0	1
Fencing	0	1	1
Futsal	10	0	10
Judo	0	1	1
Road cycling	1	0	1
Sailing	1	1	2
Skateboarding	0	1	1
Swimming	1	1	2
Taekwondo	1	0	1
Triathlon	1	0	1
Wushu	1	0	1
Total	24	15	39

== Artistic gymnastics ==
Morocco entered two gymnasts, one male and one female.

Men

Athlete	Event	Qualification								Final							
Athlete	Event	Apparatus						Total	Rank	Apparatus						Total	Rank
Athlete	Event	F	PH	R	V	PB	HB	Total	Rank	F	PH	R	V	PB	HB	Total	Rank
Zakaria Lechheb	All-around																

Women

Athlete	Event	Qualification						Final					
Athlete	Event	Apparatus				Total	Rank	Apparatus				Total	Rank
Athlete	Event	V	UB	BB	F	Total	Rank	V	UB	BB	F	Total	Rank
Lina Ait Lahcen	All-around												

Mixed

Athlete	Event	Round	Final						
Athlete	Event	Round	Apparatus					Total	Rank
Athlete	Event	Round	F	PB	HB	UB	BB	Total	Rank
Lina Ait Lahcen	Mixed team	1		—N/a				—N/a	
Lina Ait Lahcen	Mixed team	2		—N/a				—N/a	
Lina Ait Lahcen	Mixed team	3		—N/a				—N/a	
Zakaria Lechheb	Mixed team	1				—N/a		—N/a	
Zakaria Lechheb	Mixed team	2				—N/a		—N/a	
Zakaria Lechheb	Mixed team	3				—N/a		—N/a	
Total	Mixed team	—N/a							

== Athletics ==
Morocco entered five athletes, one male and four female.

=== Track & road events ===
Men

Athlete	Event	Semifinal		Final	
Athlete	Event	Result	Rank	Result	Rank
Youssef Abdoussi	2000 m steeplechase				

Women

Athlete	Event	Semifinal		Final	
Athlete	Event	Result	Rank	Result	Rank
Khadjia Elmostaqim	800 m	—N/a			
Salma Maataoui	1500 m	—N/a			
Malak Elmaaroufi	400 m hurdles				

=== Field events ===
Women

Athlete	Event	Final	
Athlete	Event	Distance	Position
Maria Saadi	Long jump		

== Breaking ==
Morocco entered two athletes, one of each gender.

Athlete	Nickname	Event	Group Stage			Quarterfinal	Semifinal	Final / BM	
Athlete	Nickname	Event	Round	Votes	Rank	Opposition Result	Opposition Result	Opposition Result	Rank
	Bilel	B-Boys							
	Nawel	B-Girls							

== Beach volleyball ==
Morocco received a quota place for the men's tournament.

Summary

Team	Event	Group stage				Round of 16	Quarterfinals	Semifinals	Final / BM	
Team	Event	Opposition Result	Opposition Result	Opposition Result	Rank	Opposition Result	Opposition Result	Opposition Result	Opposition Result	Rank
Yasser Errazi; Othmane Taghdouini	Men's tournament									

== Beach wrestling ==
Morocco entered four athletes, two of each gender.

Men

Team	Event	Group stage				Semifinals	Final / BM	
Team	Event	Opposition Result	Opposition Result	Opposition Result	Rank	Opposition Result	Opposition Result	Rank
Abdeljalil Benelyassar	–80 kg							
Nour Ghannam	–90 kg							

Women

Team	Event	Group stage				Semifinals	Final / BM	
Team	Event	Opposition Result	Opposition Result	Opposition Result	Rank	Opposition Result	Opposition Result	Rank
Rana Lahssini	–55 kg							
Inaya Lahssini	–75 kg							

== Boxing ==
Morocco entered two female athletes.

Women

Athlete	Weight	Round of 16	Quarterfinals	Semifinals	Final	
Athlete	Weight	Opposition Result	Opposition Result	Opposition Result	Opposition Result	Rank
Meryem Boukraa	–48 kg					
Manar Adnane	–54 kg					

== Equestrian ==
Morocco received a quota place as one of the four invited NOCs from Africa.

Athlete	Horse	Event	Penalties round A			Penalties round B			Qualifiers positions	Final		
Athlete	Horse	Event	Jump	Time	Rank	Jump	Time	Rank	Qualifiers positions	Jump	Time	Rank
Ghali Bougja		Individual jumping										

== Fencing ==
Morocco entered one female athlete.

Women

Athlete	Event	Pool round		Round of 16	Quarterfinals	Semifinals	Final / BM	
Athlete	Event	Opposition Score	Seed	Opposition Score	Opposition Score	Opposition Score	Opposition Score	Rank
Hiba Zaimi	Foil							

== Futsal ==
Morocco entered a team for the men's tournament.

Summary

Event	Group stage				Semifinal	Final / BM	
Event	Opposition Score	Opposition Score	Opposition Score	Group Rank	Opposition Score	Opposition Score	Rank
Men's tournament							

Roster

- Alae Ait Challa
- Mohamed Bamhamed
- Hamza Elahmadi
- Youssef Haddou
- Brahim Houdane
- Hamza Iissi
- Mohamed Karouk
- Zakariya Sarghine
- Mohammed Serrar
- Mohamed Touil

== Judo ==
Morocco entered one female judoka based on the available quotas assigned by the International Judo Federation.

Women

Athlete	Event	Round of 16	Quarterfinals	Semifinals	Repechage 1	Repechage 2	Final	
Athlete	Event	Opposition Result	Opposition Result	Opposition Result	Opposition Result	Opposition Result	Opposition Result	Rank
Abir Bouazzaoui	–63 kg							

== Road cycling ==
Morocco entered one male athlete.

Men

Athlete	Event	Time	Rank
Imrane Serhani	Road race	1:42:06	32
Imrane Serhani	Time trial		

== Sailing ==
Morocco entered two athletes, one of each gender.

Athlete	Event	Opening Series – Points per Race											Total points	Net points	Final rank
Athlete	Event	1	2	3	4	5	6	7	8	9	10	M	Total points	Net points	Final rank
Mohamed Achkam	Men's windsurfing														
Sarah Mouissi	Women's windsurfing														

== Skateboarding ==
Morocco entered one female athlete based on available quotas.

Women

Athlete	Event	Semifinal		Final	
Athlete	Event	Result	Rank	Result	Rank
Noura Amghar	Street				

== Swimming ==
Morocco entered two swimmers, one male and one female.

Athlete	Event	Heat		Final	
Athlete	Event	Time	Rank	Time	Rank
Mohamed Larhlimi	50 m breaststroke				
Mohamed Larhlimi	100 m breaststroke				
Mohamed Larhlimi	200 m breaststroke				
Rhalmane Yasmin	100 m freestyle				
Rhalmane Yasmin	200 m freestyle				
Rhalmane Yasmin	400 m freestyle				
Rhalmane Yasmin	800 m freestyle				

== Taekwondo ==
Morocco entered one male athlete.

Men

Athlete	Event	Round of 16	Quarterfinals	Semifinals	Repechage	Final / BM	
Athlete	Event	Opposition Result	Opposition Result	Opposition Result	Opposition Result	Opposition Result	Rank
Abdellatif Ladimat	-48 kg	Bye					

== Triathlon ==
Morocco entered one male athlete.

Athlete	Event	Time						Rank
Athlete	Event	Swim (750m)	Trans 1	Bike (20km)	Trans 2	Run (5km)	Total	Rank
Ziad Bouchikha	Men's individual							

== Wushu ==
Morocco entered one male athlete after quotas were assigned by the International Wushu Federation.

Athlete	Event	Taijishan routine		Taijiquan routine		Total Points	Final Rank
Athlete	Event	Points	Rank	Points	Rank	Total Points	Final Rank
Oussama El Maghnaoui	Men's taijiquan combined						
