= Venezuela at the 2026 Summer Youth Olympics =

- Flag of Venezuela
- IOC code: VEN
- NOC: Venezuelan Olympic Committee
- Website: covoficial.com.ve

in Dakar, Senegal October 31, 2026 – November 13, 2026
- Competitors: 14 in 8 sports
- Flag bearers: Rosalvick Aguilar & Fabricio Rodríguez
- Medals: Gold 2 Silver 3 Bronze 1 Total 6

Summer Youth Olympics appearances (overview)
- 2010; 2014; 2018; 2026

Venezuela is scheduled to compete at the 2026 Summer Youth Olympics in Dakar, Senegal from October 31 to November 13, 2026. This will mark Venezuela's fourth appearance at the Youth Olympics, after making its debut in 2010.

Judoka Rosalvick Aguilar and badminton player Fabricio Rodríguez served as the flag bearers for the opening ceremony.

== Competitors ==
The following is the list of number of competitors participating at the Games per sport/discipline.

Sport	Men	Women	Total
3x3 basketball	4	0	4
Athletics	2	1	3
Badminton	1	0	1
Beach volleyball	2	0	2
Beach wrestling	1	1	2
Boxing	0	2	2
Fencing	1	0	1
Futsal	0	10	10
Judo	0	1	1
Road cycling	1	0	1
Sailing	1	0	1
Swimming	1	1	2
Table tennis	1	1	2
Triathlon	1	0	1
Wushu	0	1	1
Total	16	18	34

== Medalists ==
Medal	Name	Sport	Event	Date
Silver	Valeria Dudamel	Wushu	Women's changquan combined	3 November
Bronze	Rosalvick Aguilar	Judo	Women's –44kg	1 November

== 3x3 basketball ==
Venezuela entered a team for the men's tournament as one of the three participating teams from the Americas.

Summary

Event	Pool play			Quarterfinal	Semifinal	Final / BM	
Event	Opposition Score	Opposition Score	Group Rank	Opposition Score	Opposition Score	Opposition Score	Rank
Men's tournament	Argentina L 14–17	Mongolia L 19–21	3	Did not advance			

Roster

- Evys Nava
- Bryan Gómez
- Naudi López
- Ricardo Villarroel

== Athletics ==
Venezuela entered three athletes, two male and one female.

=== Track & road events ===
Men

Athlete	Event	Semifinal		Final	
Athlete	Event	Result	Rank	Result	Rank
Richard Peña	400 m	48.36	4 Q	48.78	5

Women

Athlete	Event	Semifinal		Final	
Athlete	Event	Result	Rank	Result	Rank
Osmary Pacheco	400 m	53.01	1 Q	52.85	2nd place, silver medalist(s)

=== Field events ===
Men

Athlete	Event	Final	
Athlete	Event	Distance	Position
Emmanuel Chávez	Pole vault	3.80	8

== Badminton ==
Venezuela entered one male athlete.

Athlete	Event	Round of 16	Quarterfinals	Semifinals	Final / BM	
Athlete	Event	Opposition Result	Opposition Result	Opposition Result	Opposition Result	Rank
Fabricio Rodríguez	Men's individual					

== Beach volleyball ==
Venezuela received a quota place for the men's tournament.

Summary

Team	Event	Group stage				Round of 16	Quarterfinals	Semifinals	Final / PG / BM	
Team	Event	Opposition Result	Opposition Result	Opposition Result	Rank	Opposition Result	Opposition Result	Opposition Result	Opposition Result	Rank
Santiago Camejo; Moisés Yepez	Men's tournament									

== Beach wrestling ==
Brazil entered one male athlete.

Men

Athlete	Weight	Round of 16	Quarterfinals	Semifinals	Final / BM	
Athlete	Weight	Opposition Result	Opposition Result	Opposition Result	Opposition Result	Rank
Wilfredo Rodríguez	-60 kg					

Women

Athlete	Weight	Round of 16	Quarterfinals	Semifinals	Final / BM	
Athlete	Weight	Opposition Result	Opposition Result	Opposition Result	Opposition Result	Rank
Ester Oyola	-75 kg					

== Boxing ==
Venezuela entered two female athletes in the -51 kg and -54 kg categories.

Women

Athlete	Weight	Round of 16	Quarterfinals	Semifinals	Final / BM	
Athlete	Weight	Opposition Result	Opposition Result	Opposition Result	Opposition Result	Rank
Grenyelis García	-51 kg	Lea Newman (NZL); W 5-0	Ella Demesi (KEN); W RSC	Cerine Kessal (ALG); W 5-0	Gular Huseynova (AZE); W 5-0	1st place, gold medalist(s)
Yeniree Castilo	-54 kg	Yura Kanemaru (JPN); L 0-5	Did not advance			

== Fencing ==
Venezuela entered one male athlete.

Athlete	Event	Round of 64	Round of 32	Round of 16	Quarterfinal	Semifinal	Final / BM	
Athlete	Event	Opposition Score	Opposition Score	Opposition Score	Opposition Score	Opposition Score	Opposition Score	Rank
Ángel Martínez	Men's foil							

== Futsal ==
Venezuela entered a team for the women's tournament.

Summary

Event	Group stage				Semifinal	Final / BM	
Event	Opposition Score	Opposition Score	Opposition Score	Group Rank	Opposition Score	Opposition Score	Rank
Women's tournament	Ukraine; L 4-5	Senegal; W 1-0	Fiji; W 6-0	2 Q	Iran; W 3-2 (aet)	Ukraine; L 3-4	2nd place, silver medalist(s)

Roster

- Nelmari Aguilar
- María Briceño
- Victoria Colmenarez
- Valeska Gutiérrez
- Antonella Mejía
- Flavia Rodríguez
- Eliannys Paz
- Sophya Silva
- Sofía Torrealba
- Alexa Velásquez

== Judo ==
Venezuela entered one female judoka based on the available quotas assigned by the International Judo Federation.

Women

Athlete	Event	Round of 16	Quarterfinals	Semifinals	Repechage	Final / BM	
Athlete	Event	Opposition Result	Opposition Result	Opposition Result	Opposition Result	Opposition Result	Rank
Rosalvick Aguilar	-44 kg	Nour Dohamed (DJI) W 101-0	Aïche Diop (SEN) W 101-0	Houda Wshah (JOR) L 0–1	—N/a	Theresa Tagarira (BOT) W 100–0	3rd place, bronze medalist(s)

== Road cycling ==
Venezuela entered one male athlete.

Men

Athlete	Event	Time	Rank
Rikeybeth Alvarado	Road race	1:47:33	10
Rikeybeth Alvarado	Time trial	11:43.99	27

== Sailing ==
Venezuela entered one male athlete.

Athlete	Event	Opening Series – Points per Race											Total points	Net points	Final rank
Athlete	Event	1	2	3	4	5	6	7	8	9	10	M	Total points	Net points	Final rank
Adolfo Fernández	Men's windsurfing														

== Swimming ==
Venezuela entered two swimmers, one male and one female.

Athlete	Event	Heat		Semifinal		Final	
Athlete	Event	Time	Rank	Time	Rank	Time	Rank
Adanuriel Rosal	100 m freestyle	51.53	8 Q	N/A	N/A	50.96	6
Adanuriel Rosal	200 m freestyle	1:52.59	5 Q	N/A		1:51.18	5
Adanuriel Rosal	400 m freestyle	N/A	N/A	N/A	N/A	4:03.82	14
Johana Gómez	50 m backstroke	31.05	22	n/a	n/a	n/a	n/a

== Table tennis ==
Venezuela entered two athletes (one male and one female).

Athlete	Event	Preliminary	Round 1	Round 2	Round 3	Round of 16	Quarterfinals	Semifinals	Final / BM	
Athlete	Event	Opposition Result	Opposition Result	Opposition Result	Opposition Result	Opposition Result	Opposition Result	Opposition Result	Opposition Result	Rank
Jonathan Vegas	Men's singles									
Dakota Ferrer	Women's singles									
Jonathan Vegas; Dakota Ferrer	Mixed doubles									

== Triathlon ==
Venezuela entered one male athlete.

Athlete	Event	Time						Rank
Athlete	Event	Swim (750m)	Trans 1	Bike (20km)	Trans 2	Run (5km)	Total	Rank
Aaron Hernández	Men's individual	8:28	0:22	28:18	0:21	17:54	55:23	15

== Wushu ==
Venezuela entered one female athlete after quotas were assigned by the International Wushu Federation.

Athlete	Event	Gunshu preliminary routine		Changquan preliminary routine		Total Points	Preliminary Rank	Gunshu final routine		Changquan final routine		Total Points	Final Rank
Athlete	Event	Points	Rank	Points	Rank	Total Points	Preliminary Rank	Points	Rank	Points	Rank	Total Points	Final Rank
Valeria Dudamel	Women's changquan combined	8.683	4	8.893	3	17.576	3 Q	9.246	2	8.953	3	18.199	2nd place, silver medalist(s)
