= Colombia at the 2026 Summer Youth Olympics =

- Flag of Colombia
- IOC code: COL
- NOC: Colombian Olympic Committee
- Website: www.olimpicocol.co

in Dakar, Senegal October 31, 2026 – November 13, 2026
- Competitors: 22 in 13 sports
- Flag bearers: María Gabriela Becerra & Emanuel Otalvaro
- Medals: Gold 0 Silver 1 Bronze 1 Total 2

Summer Youth Olympics appearances (overview)
- 2010; 2014; 2018; 2026

Colombia is scheduled to compete at the 2026 Summer Youth Olympics in Dakar, Senegal from October 31 to November 13, 2026. This will mark Colombia's fourth appearance at the Youth Olympics, after making its debut in 2010.

Swimmer María Gabriela Becerra and table tennis player Emanuel Otalvaro served as the flag bearers for the opening ceremony.

== Competitors ==
The following is the list of number of competitors participating at the Games per sport/discipline.

Sport	Men	Women	Total
Archery	1	1	2
Artistic gymnastics	2	0	2
Athletics	1	3	4
Beach wrestling	0	1	1
Boxing	1	2	3
Breaking	1	0	1
Equestrian	1	0	1
Fencing	1	0	1
Road cycling	1	1	2
Swimming	1	1	2
Skateboarding	1	0	1
Table tennis	1	0	1
Triathlon	0	1	1
Total	12	10	22

== Archery ==
Colombia entered two archers, one of each gender.

Men

Athlete	Event	Ranking Round		Round of 16	Quarterfinals	Semifinals	Final / BM	Rank
Athlete	Event	Score	Seed	Opposition Score	Opposition Score	Opposition Score	Opposition Score	Rank
Nicolás Gómez	Individual							

Women

Athlete	Event	Ranking Round		Round of 16	Quarterfinals	Semifinals	Final / BM	Rank
Athlete	Event	Score	Seed	Opposition Score	Opposition Score	Opposition Score	Opposition Score	Rank
Juana Cardona	Individual							

Mixed

Athlete	Event	Ranking Round		Round of 16	Quarterfinals	Semifinals	Final / BM	Rank
Athlete	Event	Score	Seed	Opposition Score	Opposition Score	Opposition Score	Opposition Score	Rank
Nicolás Gómez; Juana Cardona	Team							

== Artistic gymnastics ==
Colombia entered a team of two male gymnasts.

Boys
Team

Athlete	Event	Qualification								Final							
Athlete	Event	Apparatus						Total	Rank	Apparatus						Total	Rank
Athlete	Event	F	PH	R	V	PB	HB	Total	Rank	F	PH	R	V	PB	HB	Total	Rank
Matías Ramos	Team	10.666	11.266	11.266	12.166	11.566	11.800	68.730	42	Did not qualify							
Maximiliano Salcedo	Team	10.100	11.533	10.266	11.633	11.300	11.466	66.298	47	Did not qualify							
Total	Team	20.766	22.799	21.532	23.799	22.866	23.266	135.028	12	Did not qualify							

== Athletics ==
Colombia entered four athletes, one male and three female.

=== Track & road events ===
Women

Athlete	Event	Heat		Semifinal		Final	
Athlete	Event	Result	Rank	Result	Rank	Result	Rank
Wanda Arizala	100 m hurdles						
Michell Gómez	400 m hurdles						

=== Field events ===
Men

Athlete	Event	Qualification		Final	
Athlete	Event	Distance	Position	Distance	Position
Dilan Graciano	Javelin throw				

Women

Athlete	Event	Qualification		Final	
Athlete	Event	Distance	Position	Distance	Position
Ilsa Córdoba	Javelin throw				

== Beach wrestling ==
Colombia entered one female athlete.

Women

Athlete	Weight	Round of 16	Quarterfinals	Semifinals	Final / BM	
Athlete	Weight	Opposition Result	Opposition Result	Opposition Result	Opposition Result	Rank
Valery Rubio	-45 kg					

== Boxing ==
Colombia entered three athletes, one male and two female. There are in the men's -50 kg category and the women's -48 kg and -54 kg categories.

Men

Athlete	Weight	Round of 16	Quarterfinals	Semifinals	Final / BM	
Athlete	Weight	Opposition Result	Opposition Result	Opposition Result	Opposition Result	Rank
Izzon Galea	-50 kg					

Women

Athlete	Weight	Round of 16	Quarterfinals	Semifinals	Final / BM	
Athlete	Weight	Opposition Result	Opposition Result	Opposition Result	Opposition Result	Rank
Nicol Durango	-48 kg					
Evelin Trejos	-54 kg					

== Breaking ==
Colombia entered one male athlete.

Athlete	Nickname	Event	Group Stage			Quarterfinal	Semifinal	Final / BM	
Athlete	Nickname	Event	Round	Votes	Rank	Opposition Result	Opposition Result	Opposition Result	Rank
	Lil Machine	B-Boys							

== Equestrian ==
Colombia received a quota place as one of the four invited NOCs from South America.

Athlete	Horse	Event	Qualification		Final			Jump-Off		
Athlete	Horse	Event	Penalties	Rank	Penalties	Time	Rank	Penalties	Time	Rank
Alejandro Gutiérrez		Individual jumping								

== Fencing ==
Colombia entered one male athlete.

Athlete	Event	Round of 64	Round of 32	Round of 16	Quarterfinal	Semifinal	Final / BM	
Athlete	Event	Opposition Score	Opposition Score	Opposition Score	Opposition Score	Opposition Score	Opposition Score	Rank
Juan Plazas	Men's épée							

== Road cycling ==
Colombia entered two athletes, one male and one female.

Men

Athlete	Event	Time	Rank
Juan Sánchez	Road race		
Juan Sánchez	Time trial		

Women

Athlete	Event	Time	Rank
Salome Vargas	Road race		
Salome Vargas	Time trial		

== Skateboarding ==
Colombia entered one male athlete based on available quotas.

Athlete	Event	Semifinal		Final	
Athlete	Event	Result	Rank	Result	Rank
Juan Garcés	Men's Street				

== Swimming ==
Colombia entered two swimmers, one male and one female.

Athlete	Event	Heat		Semifinal		Final	
Athlete	Event	Time	Rank	Time	Rank	Time	Rank
Nicolás Kokidko	200 m freestyle						
Nicolás Kokidko	400 m freestyle						
Nicolás Kokidko	800 m freestyle						
Nicolás Kokidko	200 m butterfly						
María Gabriela Becerra	50 m freestyle						
María Gabriela Becerra	100 m freestyle						
María Gabriela Becerra	50 m backstroke						
María Gabriela Becerra	100 m backstroke						

== Table tennis ==
Colombia entered one male athlete.

Athlete	Event	Preliminary	Round 1	Round 2	Round 3	Round of 16	Quarterfinals	Semifinals	Final / BM	
Athlete	Event	Opposition Result	Opposition Result	Opposition Result	Opposition Result	Opposition Result	Opposition Result	Opposition Result	Opposition Result	Rank
Emanuel Otalvaro	Women's singles									

== Triathlon ==
Colombia entered one female athlete.

Athlete	Event	Time						Rank
Athlete	Event	Swim (750m)	Trans 1	Bike (20km)	Trans 2	Run (5km)	Total	Rank
Catalina Moreno	Women's individual							
