= Australia at the 2026 Summer Youth Olympics =

- Flag of Australia
- IOC code: AUS
- NOC: Australian Olympic Committee
- Website: www.olympics.com.au

in Dakar, Senegal October 31, 2026 – November 13, 2026
- Competitors: 41 in 16 sports
- Flag bearers: Camilla Griffin & Thomas Turner
- Medals: Gold 0 Silver 2 Bronze 2 Total 4

Summer Youth Olympics appearances
- 2010; 2014; 2018; 2026

Australia competed at the 2026 Summer Youth Olympics in Dakar, Senegal from October 31 to November 13, 2026. This marked Australia's fourth appearance at the Youth Olympics, after making its debut in 2010.

Rower Camilla Griffin and beach volleyball player Thomas Turner served as the flag bearers for the opening ceremony.

== Competitors ==
The following is the list of number of competitors that participated at the Games per sport/discipline.

Sport	Men	Women	Total
Archery	1	1	2
Artistic gymnastics	3	3	6
Badminton	1	1	2
Beach volleyball	2	0	2
Boxing	1	2	3
Coastal rowing	1	1	2
Equestrian	0	1	1
Fencing	0	1	1
Judo	0	1	1
Road cycling	1	1	2
Rugby sevens	0	12	12
Sailing	1	1	2
Skateboarding	0	1	1
Table tennis	1	1	2
Taekwondo	0	1	1
Triathlon	0	1	1
Total	12	29	41

== Archery ==
Australia entered two archers, one of each gender.

Athlete	Event	Ranking Round		Round of 16	Quarterfinals	Semifinals	Final / BM	Rank
Athlete	Event	Score	Seed	Opposition Score	Opposition Score	Opposition Score	Opposition Score	Rank
Brock Penna	Men's individual							
Ellen Martini	Women's individual							
Brock Penna; Ellen Martini	Mixed team							

== Artistic gymnastics ==
Australia entered a team of six gymnasts, three per gender.

Boys
Team

Athlete	Event	Qualification								Final							
Athlete	Event	Apparatus						Total	Rank	Apparatus						Total	Rank
Athlete	Event	F	PH	R	V	PB	HB	Total	Rank	F	PH	R	V	PB	HB	Total	Rank
Isaac Gunaskera	Team	11.733	8.700	10.133	12.033	11.333	10.666	64.598	50	did not qualify							
Oscar Scott	Team	12.400	10.200	11.700	12.166	12.133	10.966	69.565	38	did not qualify							
Elijah Wu	Team	13.000	11.233	11.366	13.466	10.500	11.466	71.031	28	did not qualify							
Total	Team	25.400	21.433	23.066	25.632	23.466	22.432	141.429	10	did not qualify							

Girls
Team

Athlete	Event	Qualification						Final					
Athlete	Event	Apparatus				Total	Rank	Apparatus				Total	Rank
Athlete	Event	V	UB	BB	FX	Total	Rank	V	UB	BB	FX	Total	Rank
Zara Andrews	Team		10.966	11.566	11.133			10.766	11.133	10.366	11.100	—N/a	
Alice Johnson	Team	11.533	11.866	12.533	12.066	47.998	20 Q	11.800	12.466	11.866	11.766	—N/a	
Olivia Meaney	Team	13.166	11.766	11.933	12.266	49.131	13 Q					—N/a	
Total	Team	24.699	23.632	24.466	24.332	97.129	7 Q	22.566	23.599	22.232	22.866	91.263	7

Individual all-around

Athlete	Event	Final					
Athlete	Event	Apparatus				Total	Rank
Athlete	Event	V	UB	BB	FX	Total	Rank
Alice Johnson	All-around	11.600	11.233	11.033	11.500	45.366	18
Olivia Meaney	All-around	13.066	11.933	12.366	10.800	48.165	12

Mixed
Mixed team

Athlete	Event	Final																				
Athlete	Event	Round 1							Round 2							Round 3						
Athlete	Event	Apparatus					Total	Rank	Apparatus					Total	Rank	Apparatus					Total	Rank
Athlete	Event	F	PB	HB	UB	BB	Total	Rank	F	PB	HB	UB	BB	Total	Rank	F	PB	HB	UB	BB	Total	Rank
Elijah Wu	Mixed team	12.800	—N/a				25.366	5 Q	—N/a		9.833	—N/a		21.366	8	did not advance						
Alice Johnson	Mixed team	—N/a			12.566	—N/a	25.366	5 Q	—N/a				11.533	21.366	8	did not advance						

== Badminton ==
Australia entered two athletes, one of each gender.

Athlete	Event	Round of 16	Quarterfinals	Semifinals	Final / BM	
Athlete	Event	Opposition Result	Opposition Result	Opposition Result	Opposition Result	Rank
Om Neelam	Men's singles					
Smrithi Adepu	Women's singles					

== Beach volleyball ==
Australia received a quota place for the men's tournament.

Summary

Team	Event	Group stage				Round of 16	Quarterfinals	Semifinals	Final / PG / BM	
Team	Event	Opposition Result	Opposition Result	Opposition Result	Rank	Opposition Result	Opposition Result	Opposition Result	Opposition Result	Rank
Ryan Edgar; Thomas Turner	Men's tournament									

== Boxing ==
Australia entered three athletes, one male and two female.

Men

Athlete	Weight	Round of 16	Quarterfinals	Semifinals	Final / BM	
Athlete	Weight	Opposition Result	Opposition Result	Opposition Result	Opposition Result	Rank
Marley Dodd	–55 kg					

Women

Athlete	Weight	Round of 16	Quarterfinals	Semifinals	Final / BM	
Athlete	Weight	Opposition Result	Opposition Result	Opposition Result	Opposition Result	Rank
Maia Laird	–51 kg					
Belle Spicer	–54 kg					

== Coastal rowing ==
Australia entered two rowers, one of each gender.

Athlete	Event	Round of 16	Quarterfinals	Semifinals	Final / BM	
Athlete	Event	Opposition Result	Opposition Result	Opposition Result	Opposition Result	Rank
Alexander Watt	Men's solo					
Camilla Griffin	Women's solo					
Alexander Watt; Camilla Griffin	Mixed double sculls					

== Road cycling ==
Australia entered two athletes, one of each gender.

Men

Athlete	Event	Time	Rank
Caleb McKenzie	Road race		
Caleb McKenzie	Time trial		

Women

Athlete	Event	Time	Rank
Elsie Apps	Road race		
Elsie Apps	Time trial		

== Equestrian ==
Australia received a quota place as one of the four invited NOCs from an intercontinenal group.

Athlete	Horse	Event	Qualification		Final			Jump-Off		
Athlete	Horse	Event	Penalties	Rank	Penalties	Time	Rank	Penalties	Time	Rank
Molly Mooney		Individual jumping								

== Fencing ==
Australia entered one female fencer.

Athlete	Event	Round of 64	Round of 32	Round of 16	Quarterfinal	Semifinal	Final / BM	
Athlete	Event	Opposition Score	Opposition Score	Opposition Score	Opposition Score	Opposition Score	Opposition Score	Rank
Rianne Leung	Women's foil							

== Judo ==
Australia entered one female judoka based on the available quotas assigned by the International Judo Federation.

Women

Athlete	Event	Round of 16	Quarterfinals	Semifinals	Repechage	Final / BM	
Athlete	Event	Opposition Result	Opposition Result	Opposition Result	Opposition Result	Opposition Result	Rank
Hannah McHenry	–78 kg						

== Rugby sevens ==
Australia entered a team for the women's tournament.

Summary

Event	Group stage				Semifinal	Final / BM	
Event	Opposition Score	Opposition Score	Opposition Score	Group Rank	Opposition Score	Opposition Score	Rank
Women's tournament	Senegal; W 32–0	China; W 21–15	Kenya; W 17–5	1	Czech Republic; W 19–10	Kenya; L 12–17	2nd place, silver medalist(s)

Roster

- Billie Backus
- Talia Berryman
- Grace Buchanan
- Keira Callaghan
- Peyton Fakaosilea
- Aimee Henry
- Darci Mackay
- Ellazae Marley
- Te Rinaade Murray
- Layne Prince
- Cobi Ryanlast
- Mia Shelley

== Sailing ==
Australia entered two athletes, one of each gender.

Athlete	Event	Opening Series – Points per Race											Total points	Net points	Final rank
Athlete	Event	1	2	3	4	5	6	7	8	9	10	M	Total points	Net points	Final rank
Stirling McKay	Men's windsurfing														
Sophie Brazier	Women's windsurfing														

== Skateboarding ==
Australia entered one female athlete based on available quotas.

Athlete	Event	Semifinal		Final	
Athlete	Event	Result	Rank	Result	Rank
Ella Ledingham	Women's street				

== Table tennis ==
Australia entered two athletes (one male and one female).

Athlete	Event	Preliminary	Round 1	Round 2	Round 3	Round of 16	Quarterfinals	Semifinals	Final / BM	
Athlete	Event	Opposition Result	Opposition Result	Opposition Result	Opposition Result	Opposition Result	Opposition Result	Opposition Result	Opposition Result	Rank
Ting Chia Chang	Men's singles									
Daisy Xie	Women's singles									
Ting Chia Chang; Daisy Xie	Mixed doubles									

== Taekwondo ==
Australia entered one female athlete.

Women

Athlete	Event	Round of 16	Quarterfinals	Semifinals	Repechage	Final / BM	
Athlete	Event	Opposition Result	Opposition Result	Opposition Result	Opposition Result	Opposition Result	Rank
Mackenzie Macdonald	–49 kg						

== Triathlon ==
Australia entered one female athlete.

Athlete	Event	Time						Rank
Athlete	Event	Swim (750m)	Trans 1	Bike (20km)	Trans 2	Run (5km)	Total	Rank
Piper Anderson	Women's individual							

== See also ==
- Australia at the 2026 Winter Olympics
- Australia at the 2026 Commonwealth Games
