= 2026 Summer Youth Olympics medal table =

The 2026 Summer Youth Olympics medal table is a list of National Olympic Committees (NOCs) ranked by the number of gold medals won by their athletes during the 2026 Summer Youth Olympics, held in Dakar, Senegal, from 31 October to 13 November 2026.

Of the nations that won medals at these Games, four had not won an Olympic medal nor Youth Olympic medal, Antigua and Barbuda, Democratic Republic of the Congo, The Gambia and Madagascar. Cyprus and Kuwait won their first gold medal at an Olympic/Youth Olympic event, having previously only won silver and bronze medals. Hong Kong, Jordan and United Arab Emirates won their first Youth Olympics gold medal. Paraguay, Senegal and Zimbabwe won their first Youth Olympics gold medal and first ever Youth Olympics medals. Burkina Faso and Guyana won their first ever Youth Olympics medals.

== Medal table ==
The Organising Committee does not keep an official medal tally. The ranking in this table is based on information provided by the International Olympic Committee (IOC) and is consistent with IOC convention in its published medal tables. By default, the table is ordered by the number of gold medals the athletes from a nation have won (in this context, a "nation" is an entity represented by a National Olympic Committee). The number of silver medals is taken into consideration next and then the number of bronze medals. If nations are still tied, equal ranking is given and they are listed alphabetically.

Two gold medals were awarded for a first-place tie in men's 50 metre backstroke event. No silver medal was awarded as a consequence.

In boxing (10), judo (8), and taekwondo (10) two bronze medals are awarded in each event (28 additional bronze medals total). Additionally, two bronze medals were awarded for a third-place tie in the women's pole vault and men's triathlon events.

* Host nation (Senegal)

Rank	Nation	Gold	Silver	Bronze	Total
1	China	18	8	7	33
2	Japan	11	8	9	28
3	Russia	8	4	2	14
4	Egypt	6	1	5	12
5	Ethiopia	5	3	0	8
6	Senegal*	5	0	7	12
7	France	4	5	4	13
8	Kenya	4	2	0	6
9	South Africa	3	5	3	11
10	Croatia	3	4	0	7
11	Ukraine	3	3	3	9
12	Brazil	3	3	1	7
13	Azerbaijan	3	3	0	6
14	Germany	3	2	3	8
15	Turkey	3	1	5	9
16	Jordan	3	1	0	4
17	Nigeria	3	0	0	3
18	Spain	2	5	5	12
19	Chinese Taipei	2	4	3	9
20	Uzbekistan	2	4	2	8
21	India	2	3	5	10
22	Kazakhstan	2	3	3	8
23	Hungary	2	3	2	7
24	Venezuela	2	3	1	6
25	New Zealand	2	3	0	5
26	Italy	2	2	4	8
27	Hong Kong	2	2	3	7
28	Portugal	2	2	2	6
28	United States	2	2	2	6
30	Greece	2	2	1	5
30	Jamaica	2	2	1	5
32	Romania	2	2	0	4
33	Switzerland	2	1	2	5
33	United Arab Emirates	2	1	2	5
35	Argentina	2	0	4	6
36	Dominican Republic	2	0	0	2
36	Ecuador	2	0	0	2
38	Iran	1	4	3	8
39	Colombia	1	3	4	8
39	South Korea	1	3	4	8
41	Lithuania	1	3	1	5
42	Serbia	1	3	0	4
43	Slovakia	1	2	3	6
44	Georgia	1	2	1	4
45	Austria	1	1	4	6
46	Canada	1	1	3	5
47	Great Britain	1	1	2	4
48	Czech Republic	1	1	1	3
48	Singapore	1	1	1	3
50	Netherlands	1	1	0	2
51	Belgium	1	0	4	5
51	Cyprus	1	0	4	5
53	Poland	1	0	2	3
54	Cuba	1	0	0	1
54	Kuwait	1	0	0	1
54	Paraguay	1	0	0	1
54	Puerto Rico	1	0	0	1
54	Saudi Arabia	1	0	0	1
54	Slovenia	1	0	0	1
54	Uruguay	1	0	0	1
54	Zimbabwe	1	0	0	1
62	Australia	0	4	2	6
63	Mexico	0	3	11	14
64	Tunisia	0	2	1	3
65	Vietnam	0	2	0	2
66	Morocco	0	1	3	4
67	Indonesia	0	1	2	3
67	Israel	0	1	2	3
69	Algeria	0	1	1	2
69	Bulgaria	0	1	1	2
69	Eritrea	0	1	1	2
69	Philippines	0	1	1	2
69	Thailand	0	1	1	2
74	Antigua and Barbuda	0	1	0	1
74	Guyana	0	1	0	1
74	Ireland	0	1	0	1
74	Lebanon	0	1	0	1
74	Luxembourg	0	1	0	1
74	Sri Lanka	0	1	0	1
74	The Gambia	0	1	0	1
74	Trinidad and Tobago	0	1	0	1
82	Belarus	0	0	3	3
82	Moldova	0	0	3	3
82	Uganda	0	0	3	3
85	Burkina Faso	0	0	2	2
85	Mongolia	0	0	2	2
85	Niger	0	0	2	2
88	Armenia	0	0	1	1
88	Bolivia	0	0	1	1
88	Burundi	0	0	1	1
88	Chile	0	0	1	1
88	Democratic Republic of the Congo	0	0	1	1
88	Estonia	0	0	1	1
88	Kyrgyzstan	0	0	1	1
88	Latvia	0	0	1	1
88	Madagascar	0	0	1	1
88	Qatar	0	0	1	1
88	Sweden	0	0	1	1
88	Zambia	0	0	1	1
Totals (99 entries)		152	150	181	483

Source: Dakar 2026
