= Tunisia at the 2026 Summer Youth Olympics =

- Flag of Tunisia
- IOC code: TUN
- NOC: Tunisian Olympic Committee
- Website: www.cnot.org.tn

in Dakar, Senegal October 31, 2026 – November 13, 2026
- Competitors: 42 in 16 sports
- Medals: Gold 0 Silver 2 Bronze 1 Total 3

Summer Youth Olympics appearances (overview)
- 2010; 2014; 2018; 2026

Tunisia is scheduled to compete at the 2026 Summer Youth Olympics in Dakar, Senegal from October 31 to November 13, 2026. This will mark Tunisia's fourth appearance at the Youth Olympics, after making its debut in 2010.

Windsurfer Rayen Briki won the bronze medal in the boys' Techno 293 event, Tunisia's first medal in sailing at either the Summer Olympics or the Youth Olympics.

== Medalists ==
Medal	Name	Sport	Event
Silver	Katr Ennada Jaoued	Athletics	Girls' discus throw
Silver	Yasmine Haouani	Taekwondo	Girls' 55 kg
Bronze	Rayen Briki	Sailing	Boys' Techno 293

== Competitors ==
The following is the list of number of competitors participating at the Games per sport/discipline.

Sport	Men	Women	Total
Archery	1	1	2
Artistic gymnastics	1	1	2
Athletics	3	3	6
Beach handball	10	0	10
Beach volleyball	0	2	2
Boxing	0	1	1
Coastal rowing	1	1	2
Fencing	1	0	1
Judo	0	1	1
Road cycling	1	0	1
Sailing	1	1	2
Swimming	2	2	4
Table tennis	1	1	2
Taekwondo	2	2	4
Triathlon	1	0	1
Wushu	0	1	1
Total	25	17	42

== Archery ==
Tunisia entered two archers, one of each gender.

== Sailing ==
Tunisia entered one windsurfer in each of the boys' and girls' Techno 293 events, Rayen Briki and Frida Sethom. Briki finished third overall with 48 points to win the bronze medal, behind Evangelos Kyriazakos of Greece and Ng Hoi Tik of Hong Kong. The final race of the series was cancelled for lack of wind, and the standings were left as they were. The medal was Tunisia's first in sailing at either the Summer Olympics or the Youth Olympics.

Athlete	Event	Net points	Rank
Rayen Briki	Boys' Techno 293	48	3rd place, bronze medalist(s)

== Wushu ==
Tunisia entered one wushu athlete to compete in Taolu events.

Athlete	Event	Preliminary Round				Final			
Athlete	Event	Routine	Score	Total	Rank	Routine	Score	Total	Rank
Zeineb Manai	Women's Taijiquan	Taijishan	8.973	17.883	8 Q	Taijishan	8.723	17.533	8
Zeineb Manai	Women's Taijiquan	Taijiquan	9.003	17.883	8 Q	Taijiquan	8.530	17.533	8
