= Senegal at the 2026 Summer Youth Olympics =

- Flag of Senegal
- IOC code: SEN
- NOC: Senegalese National Olympic and Sports Committee

in Dakar, Senegal October 31, 2026 – November 13, 2026
- Competitors: 136 in 23 sports
- Medals: Gold 5 Silver 0 Bronze 7 Total 12

Summer Youth Olympics appearances
- 2010; 2014; 2018; 2026

Senegal competed as the host nation of the 2026 Summer Youth Olympics in Dakar, Senegal from October 31 to November 13, 2026. This marked Senegal's fourth appearance at the Youth Olympics, after making its debut in 2010.

Senegal won their first ever gold medal at an Olympic-level event courtesy of Elisabeth Diatta in beach wrestling.

== Competitors ==
The following is the list of number of competitors participating at the Games per sport/discipline.

| Sport | Men | Women | Total |
|---|---|---|---|
| 3x3 basketball | 4 | 4 | 8 |
| Artistic gymnastics | 1 | 1 | 2 |
| Athletics | 1 | 2 | 3 |
| Badminton | 1 | 1 | 2 |
| Baseball5 | 4 | 4 | 8 |
| Beach handball | 10 | 10 | 20 |
| Beach volleyball | 2 | 2 | 4 |
| Beach wrestling | 4 | 4 | 8 |
| Boxing | 1 | 2 | 3 |
| Breaking | 1 | 1 | 2 |
| Coastal rowing | 1 | 1 | 2 |
| Equestrian | 0 | 1 | 1 |
| Fencing | 3 | 3 | 6 |
| Futsal | 10 | 10 | 20 |
| Judo | 1 | 1 | 2 |
| Road cycling | 2 | 2 | 4 |
| Rugby sevens | 12 | 12 | 24 |
| Sailing | 1 | 0 | 1 |
| Swimming | 3 | 3 | 6 |
| Table tennis | 1 | 1 | 2 |
| Taekwondo | 2 | 2 | 4 |
| Triathlon | 1 | 1 | 2 |
| Wushu | 1 | 1 | 2 |
| Total | 67 | 69 | 136 |

== Medal summary ==
=== Medal table ===
| Sport | Gold | Silver | Bronze | Total |
|---|---|---|---|---|
| 3x3 basketball | 1 | 0 | 1 | 2 |
| Beach handball | 0 | 0 | 2 | 2 |
| Beach wrestling | 3 | 0 | 1 | 4 |
| Judo | 0 | 0 | 1 | 1 |
| Taekwondo | 1 | 0 | 2 | 3 |
| Total | 5 | 0 | 7 | 12 |

=== Medalists ===
The following Senegalese competitors won medals at the Youth Olympics.

| Medal | Athlete | Sport | Event | Date |
|---|---|---|---|---|
| Gold | Elisabeth Diatta | Beach wrestling | Women's 55 kg | 7 November |
| Gold | Maguette Diop | Beach wrestling | Men's 80 kg | 7 November |
| Gold | Ndeye Diatta | Beach wrestling | Women's 45 kg | 8 November |
| Gold | Frédéric Clovice Mané; Ibrahima Ndiaye; Papa Mamadou Cissé; Sacoura Diop | 3x3 basketball | Men's | 9 November |
| Gold | Marie Sarr | Taekwondo | Women's 55 kg | 10 November |
| Bronze | Matar Diop | Judo | Men's 66 kg | 1 November |
| Bronze | Ablaye Diouf | Beach wrestling | Men's 90 kg | 8 November |
| Bronze | Fatou Diop; Bintou Bangoura; Fatou Ndiaye; Néné Sira Diallo | 3x3 basketball | Women's | 9 November |
| Bronze | Aida Toure | Taekwondo | Women's 63 kg | 10 November |
| Bronze | Ameth Diop | Taekwondo | Men's 73 kg | 11 November |
| Bronze | Mouhamed Thiam; Mouhamed Sidibe; Serigne Babacar Diop; Wally Thiam; Amadou Ndiaye; Saliou Diop; Moussa Balla Sall; Mamour Diop; Mamadou Sonko; Abdourahmane Diop | Beach handball | Men's | 13 November |
| Bronze | Awa Bousso Ba; Fama Mar; Bineta Ba; Mariama Diaw; Aita Ndiaye; Latdara Ndoye; Mbayang Diallo; Maman Coumba Diop; Fatimata Boucar Sow; Oumou Diop | Beach handball | Women's | 13 November |

== 3x3 basketball ==
Senegal entered a team for both tournaments as the host country.

| Team | Event | Group stage | | | Quarterfinal | Semifinal | Gold medal match | |
| Team | Event | Opposition Score | Opposition Score | Rank | Opposition Score | Opposition Score | Opposition Score | Rank |
|---|---|---|---|---|---|---|---|---|
| Senegal boys' | Boys | Algeria; W 16–13 | Lithuania; W 21–12 | 1 Q | Mongolia; W 20–11 | Germany; W 16–15 OT | Lithuania; W 14–13 | 1st place, gold medalist(s) |
| Senegal girls' | Girls | France; W 18–12 | Poland; W 20–19 | 1 Q | Chile; W 13–11 | China; L 19–21 | Egypt; W 18–17 | 3rd place, bronze medalist(s) |

Roster

Boys

- Papa Mamadou Cissé
- Sacoura Diop
- Frédéric Clovice Mané
- Ibrahima Ndiaye

Girls

- Fatou Diop
- Néné Sira Diallo
- Bintou Bangoura
- Fatou Ndiaye

== Archery ==
Senegal entered two archers, one of each gender.

== Baseball5 ==
| Team | Event | Group stage | | | | Quarterfinal | Semifinal | Gold medal match | |
| Team | Event | Opposition Score | Opposition Score | Opposition Score | Rank | Opposition Score | Opposition Score | Opposition Score | Rank |
|---|---|---|---|---|---|---|---|---|---|
| Senegal | Mixed | Chinese Taipei; L 0-2 | Cuba; L 0-2 | Turkey; L 0-2 | Did not advance | | | | |

== Beach handball ==
| Team | Event | Group stage | | | | Quarterfinal | Semifinal | Gold medal match | |
| Team | Event | Opposition Score | Opposition Score | Opposition Score | Rank | Opposition Score | Opposition Score | Opposition Score | Rank |
|---|---|---|---|---|---|---|---|---|---|
| Senegal boys' | Boys | Brazil | Hungary | Puerto Rico | | | | | |
| Senegal girls' | Girls | France | Uruguay | Kenya | | | | | |

== Futsal ==
| Team | Event | Group stage | | | | Quarterfinal | Semifinal | Gold medal match | |
| Team | Event | Opposition Score | Opposition Score | Opposition Score | Rank | Opposition Score | Opposition Score | Opposition Score | Rank |
|---|---|---|---|---|---|---|---|---|---|
| Senegal boys' | Boys | Afghanistan; L 2-9 | Panama; W 5-4 | Argentina; L 0-6 | 3 | Did not advance | | | 6 |
| Senegal girls' | Girls | Fiji; W 8-1 | Venezuela; L 0-1 | Ukraine; L 2-7 | 3 | Did not advance | | | 6 |

== Rugby sevens ==
| Team | Event | Group stage | | | | Semifinal | Final / BM | |
| Team | Event | Opposition Score | Opposition Score | Opposition Score | Rank | Opposition Score | Opposition Score | Rank |
|---|---|---|---|---|---|---|---|---|
| Senegal boys' | Boys | South Africa; L 43–5 | Germany; L 12–31 | Canada; L 0–40 | 4 | Japan; L 5–19 | Uganda; W 10–5 | 7 |
| Senegal girls' | Girls | Australia; L 0–32 | Kenya; L 0–19 | China; L 7–27 | 4 | United States; L 5–14 | Spain; L 0–27 | 8 |
