= Football at the Summer Youth Olympics =

- Governing body: FIFA
- Events: 2 (men: 1; women: 1)

Games
- 2010; 2014; 2018; 2026

Football at the Summer Youth Olympics
- Events: 2 (men: 1; women: 1)

Games
- 2010; 2014; 2018; 2026

Football was inducted at the Youth Olympic Games at the inaugural edition in 2010 for both boys and girls.

From the 2018 edition in Buenos Aires, FIFA replaced football with futsal.

== Football ==
=== Boys ===
==== Summaries ====
Year	Host	Gold medal game			Bronze medal game		
Year	Host	Gold medalist	Score	Silver medalist	Bronze medalist	Score	Fourth place
2010; Details	Singapore	Bolivia	5–0	Haiti	Singapore	4–1	Montenegro
2014; Details	(China); Nanjing	Peru	2–1	South Korea	Iceland	4–0	Cape Verde

==== Team appearances ====
Team	2010	2014
Bolivia	1st	–
Cape Verde	–	4th
Haiti	2nd	–
Honduras	–	5th
Iceland	–	3rd
Montenegro	4th	–
Peru	–	1st
Singapore	3rd	–
South Korea	–	2nd
Vanuatu	5th	6th
Zimbabwe	6th	–

=== Girls ===
==== Summaries ====
Year	Host	Gold medal game			Bronze medal game		
Year	Host	Gold medalist	Score	Silver medalist	Bronze medalist	Score	Fourth place
2010; Details	Singapore	Chile	1–1; 5–3 (p)	Equatorial Guinea	Turkey	3–0	Iran
2014; Details	(China); Nanjing	China	5–0	Venezuela	Mexico	3–1	Slovakia

==== Team appearances ====
Team	2010	2014
Chile	1st	–
China	–	1st
Equatorial Guinea	2nd	–
Iran	4th	–
Mexico	–	3rd
Namibia	–	6th
Papua New Guinea	6th	5th
Slovakia	–	4th
Trinidad and Tobago	5th	–
Turkey	3rd	–
Venezuela	–	2nd

== Futsal ==
=== Boys ===
Boys' Youth Olympic Futsal Tournament
- Organiser(s): IOC; FIFA
- Region: International
- Teams: 8 (finals) (from 6 confederations)
- 2026 Summer Youth Olympics

==== Results ====
Year	Host	Gold medal game			Bronze medal game		
Year	Host	Gold medalist	Score	Silver medalist	Bronze medalist	Score	Fourth place
2018; Details	(Argentina); Buenos Aires	Brazil	4–1	Russia	Egypt	5–4	Argentina
2026; Details	(Senegal); Dakar	Argentina	2–1	Portugal	Morocco	2–1	Afghanistan

==== Team appearances ====
Team	2018	2026
Afghanistan	—	4th
Argentina	4th	1st
Brazil	1st	—
Costa Rica	8th	—
Egypt	3rd	—
Iran	6th	—
Iraq	5th	—
Morocco	—	3rd
Panama	9th	7th
Paraguay	—	5th
Portugal	—	2nd
Russia	2nd	—
Senegal	—	6th
Slovakia	7th	—
Solomon Islands	10th	8th

=== Girls ===
Girls' Youth Olympic Futsal Tournament
- Organiser(s): IOC; FIFA
- Region: International
- Teams: 8 (finals) (from 6 confederations)
- 2026 Summer Youth Olympics

==== Results ====
Year	Host	Gold medal game			Bronze medal game		
Year	Host	Gold medalist	Score	Silver medalist	Bronze medalist	Score	Fourth place
2018; Details	(Argentina); Buenos Aires	Portugal	4–1	Japan	Spain	11–0	Bolivia
2026; Details	(Senegal); Dakar	Ukraine	4–3	Venezuela	Iran	5–2	Italy

==== Team appearances ====
Team	2018	2026
Bolivia	4th	—
Cameroon	6th	5th
Chile	8th	—
Costa Rica	—	7th
Dominican Republic	9th	—
Costa Rica	—	8th
Iran	—	3rd
Italy	—	4th
Japan	2nd	—
Portugal	1st	—
Senegal	—	6th
Spain	3rd	—
Thailand	5th	—
Tonga	10th	—
Trinidad and Tobago	7th	—
Ukraine	—	1st
Venezuela	—	2nd

== Medal table ==
As of the 2026 Summer Youth Olympics.

Rank	Nation	Gold	Silver	Bronze	Total
1	Portugal	1	1	0	2
2	Argentina	1	0	0	1
2	Bolivia	1	0	0	1
2	Brazil	1	0	0	1
2	Chile	1	0	0	1
2	China	1	0	0	1
2	Peru	1	0	0	1
2	Ukraine	1	0	0	1
9	Venezuela	0	2	0	2
10	Equatorial Guinea	0	1	0	1
10	Haiti	0	1	0	1
10	Japan	0	1	0	1
10	Russia	0	1	0	1
10	South Korea	0	1	0	1
15	Egypt	0	0	1	1
15	Iceland	0	0	1	1
15	Iran	0	0	1	1
15	Mexico	0	0	1	1
15	Morocco	0	0	1	1
15	Singapore	0	0	1	1
15	Spain	0	0	1	1
15	Turkey	0	0	1	1
Totals (22 entries)		8	8	8	24

== See also ==
- Football at the Summer Olympics
