= Fiji at the 2026 Summer Youth Olympics =

- Flag of Fiji
- IOC code: FIJ
- NOC: Fiji Association of Sports and National Olympic Committee
- Website: www.fijiolympiccommittee.com

in Dakar, Senegal October 31, 2026 – November 13, 2026
- Competitors: 20 in 6 sports
- Flag bearers: Grace Khelan & Josiah Croker
- Medals: Gold 0 Silver 0 Bronze 0 Total 0

Summer Youth Olympics appearances
- 2010; 2014; 2018; 2026

Fiji is scheduled to compete at the 2026 Summer Youth Olympics in Dakar, Senegal from October 31 to November 13, 2026. This will mark Fiji's fourth appearance at the Youth Olympics, after making its debut in 2010.

Swimmer Grace Khelan and triathlete Josiah Croker served as the flag bearers for the opening ceremony.

== Competitors ==
The following is the list of number of competitors participating at the Games per sport/discipline.

Sport	Men	Women	Total
3x3 basketball	0	4	4
Athletics	1	0	1
Boxing	1	1	2
Futsal	0	10	10
Swimming	1	1	2
Triathlon	1	0	1
Total	4	16	20

== 3x3 basketball ==
Fiji entered a team for the women's tournament as one of the three participating teams from the Asia-Pacific region.

Team	Event	Group stage			Quarterfinal	Semifinal	Final / BM	
Team	Event	Opposition Score	Opposition Score	Rank	Opposition Score	Opposition Score	Opposition Score	Rank
Fiji women's	Women's	China L 4–21	Kenya					

Roster

- Nyssa Daunivalu
- Anasofaia Maiwieiwiri
- Makaefa Savu
- Zara Suka

== Athletics ==
Fiji entered one male athlete.

=== Track & road events ===
Men

Athlete	Event	Heat		Final	
Athlete	Event	Result	Rank	Result	Rank
Roko Tabete	Men's 400 m hurdles				

== Boxing ==
Fiji entered two athletes, one male and one female.

Athlete	Weight	Round of 16	Quarterfinals	Semifinals	Final / BM	
Athlete	Weight	Opposition Result	Opposition Result	Opposition Result	Opposition Result	Rank
Norman Amram	Men's lightweight					
Merewalesi Kolitapa	Women's lightweight					

== Futsal ==
Fiji entered a team for the women's tournament.

Team	Event	Group stage				Semifinal	Gold medal match	
Team	Event	Opposition Score	Opposition Score	Opposition Score	Rank	Opposition Score	Opposition Score	Rank
Fiji women's	Women's	Senegal	Colombia	Ukraine				

Roster

- Nauseeba Azharia
- Vilomena Batirerega
- Kinisimere Botesulu
- Seini Kaliseiwaqa
- Akanisi Katonitabua
- Melania Keresoni
- Teonila Levuiciva
- Tarusila Maivunidawa
- Anasofaia Maiwiriwiri
- Beatrice Qaniuci
- Makaefa Savu
- Salanieta Vasadora

== Swimming ==
Fiji entered two swimmers, one male and one female.

Athlete	Event	Heat		Final	
Athlete	Event	Time	Rank	Time	Rank
Thaddeus Kwong	Men's 100 m freestyle				
Thaddeus Kwong	Men's 50 m backstroke				
Thaddeus Kwong	Men's 100 m backstroke				
Thaddeus Kwong	Men's 50 m butterfly				
Grace Khelan	Women's 50 m freestyle				
Grace Khelan	Women's 100 m freestyle				
Grace Khelan	Women's 50 m backstroke				
Grace Khelan	Women's 50 m butterfly				

== Triathlon ==
Fiji entered one male athlete.

Athlete	Event	Time						Rank
Athlete	Event	Swim (750m)	Trans 1	Bike (20km)	Trans 2	Run (5km)	Total	Rank
Josiah Croker	Men's							
