= Cook Islands at the 2026 Summer Youth Olympics =

- Flag of Cook Islands
- IOC code: COK
- NOC: Cook Islands Sports and National Olympic Committee

in Dakar, Senegal October 31, 2026 – November 13, 2026
- Competitors: 12 in 3 sports
- Flag bearers: Alicia Story & Carter Makira
- Medals: Gold 0 Silver 0 Bronze 0 Total 0

Summer Youth Olympics appearances
- 2010; 2014; 2018; 2026

Cook Islands is scheduled to compete at the 2026 Summer Youth Olympics in Dakar, Senegal from October 31 to November 13, 2026. This will mark Cook Islands's fourth appearance at the Youth Olympics, after making its debut in 2010.

Swimmers Alicia Story and Carter Makira served as the flag bearers for the opening ceremony.

== Competitors ==
The following is the list of number of competitors participating at the Games per sport/discipline.

Sport	Men	Women	Total
Beach handball	9	0	10
Swimming	1	1	2
Triathlon	0	1	1
Total	10	2	12

== Beach handball ==
Cook Islands entered a team for the men's tournament.

Summary

Event	Group stage				Quarterfinal	Semifinal	Gold medal match	
Event	Opposition Score	Opposition Score	Opposition Score	Rank	Opposition Score	Opposition Score	Opposition Score	Rank
Men's tournament	Tunisia	Germany	Thailand					

Roster

- Travis Beniaminaneagle
- Ty Enoka
- Tairi Isamaela
- Ethan Livingstone
- Jireh Maeva
- Noovao Noovaoblake
- Clyde Puia Mauri
- Aiganalua Samania
- Tangianau Tepuretu

== Swimming ==
Cook Islands entered two swimmers, one male and one female.

Athlete	Event	Heats		Final	
Athlete	Event	Time	Rank	Time	Rank
Carter Makira	Men's 50 m breastsroke				
Carter Makira	Men's 100 m breastsroke				
Carter Makira	Men's 100 m backstroke				
Carter Makira	Men's 200 m individual medley				
Alicia Story	Men's 50 m butterfly				
Alicia Story	Men's 100 m butterfly				
Alicia Story	Men's 200 m butterfly				

== Triathlon ==
Cook Islands entered one female athlete.

Athlete	Event	Time						Rank
Athlete	Event	Swim (750m)	Trans 1	Bike (20km)	Trans 2	Run (5km)	Total	Rank
Olivia Postrzygacz	Women's							
