= Rugby sevens at the 2026 Summer Youth Olympics – Men's tournament =

2026 Summer Youth Olympics
Tournament details
- Host: Senegal
- Venue: Stade Iba Mar Diop
- Date: 1–2 November
- Teams: 8

Final positions
- Champions: France
- Runner-up: South Africa
- Third place: Argentina
- Fourth place: Canada

Tournament statistics
- Matches played: 20

The men's rugby sevens tournament at the 2026 Summer Youth Olympics will be held at the Stade Iba Mar Diop from 1 to 2 November 2026.

== Group stage ==
All times are Senegal Time (UTC+0).

=== Group A ===
Pos	Team	Pld	W	D	L	PF	PA	PD	TF	TA	B	Pts	Qualification
1	South Africa	3	3	0	0	101	29	+72	72	17	0	9	Semifinals
2	Canada	3	2	0	1	74	34	+40	12	6	1	7	Semifinals
3	Germany	3	1	0	2	48	63	−15	8	11	1	4	
4	Senegal (H)	3	0	0	3	17	114	−97	3	18	0	0	

Source: Dakar 2026
Rules for classification: 1) Points; 2) Head-to-head result; 3) Point difference; 4) Points scored.
(H) Host

1 November 2026
10:30

Germany	10–17	Canada
Try: Moutsinga 2' m Engels 15' m	Dakar 2026	Try: Burnett 3' c van Gilst 12' m MacDonald 14' m Con: MacDonald (1/2) 3'

Stade Iba Mar Diop, Dakar
Referee: Marx Stiaan (South Africa)

1 November 2026
10:52

South Africa	43–5	Senegal
Try: de Bruin 1' m T. Marule 2' m Delport 4' m Pule 7' c Nel 8' c Williams 12' c Brink 14' c Con: Dave (2/5) 7', 9'; Meyer (2/2) 12', 15'	Dakar 2026	Try: Mbengue 10' m

Stade Iba Mar Diop, Dakar
Referee: Zaid Isaacs (Namibia)

1 November 2026
13:14

Germany	31–12	Senegal
Try: Folnovic 2' c F. May 8' c Thonfeld 8' m, 16' c Engels 13' m Con: Brauner (1/3) 2'; F. May (2/2) 8', 16'	Dakar 2026	Try: Diop 3' m M. Touré 6' c Con: Ndoye (1/1) 7'

Stade Iba Mar Diop, Dakar
Referee: Juan de Bod (South Africa)

1 November 2026
13:36

South Africa	24–17	Canada
Try: Delport 2' c, 8' m Brink 10' c, 11' m Con: Dave (2/3) 4', 11'	Dakar 2026	Try: Knowlton 5' c Robb 6' m Kozakgoebel 15' m Con: MacDonald (1/3) 6'

Stade Iba Mar Diop, Dakar
Referee: Stéphane Rakotonirany (Madagascar)

1 November 2026
15:58

Canada	40–0	Senegal
Try: Burnett 1' c North 4' c, 9' c Altmann 5' c Robb 8' m van Gilst 12' c Con: MacDonald (4/5) 1', 4', 6', 9' van Gilst (1/1) 13'	Report

Stade Iba Mar Diop, Dakar
Referee: Zaid Isaacs (Nambia)

1 November 2026
16:20

South Africa	34–7	Germany
Try: Dave 2' m, 12' m Brink 6' c, 8' m Sale 9' c Meyer 13' m Con: Dave (2/5) 7', 10'	Report	Try: Grothe 4' c Con: Andre Brauner (1/1) 5'

Stade Iba Mar Diop, Dakar
Referee: Marx Stiaan (South Africa)

=== Group B ===
Pos	Team	Pld	W	D	L	PF	PA	PD	Pts	Qualification
1	France	3	3	0	0	130	7	+123	9	Semifinals
2	Argentina	3	2	0	1	87	29	+58	6	Semifinals
3	Japan	3	1	0	2	46	86	−40	3	
4	Uganda	3	0	0	3	7	148	−141	0	

Source: Dakar 2026
Rules for classification: 1) Points; 2) Head-to-head result; 3) Point difference; 4) Points scored.

1 November 2026
11:14

France	48–0	Japan
Try: Lefeuvre 1' m, 11' m Garbajosa 3' c Senga Kouo 5' m Delample 7' c Vermeulen 8' c Ripert 13' c Petitgenet 15' m Con: S. Laharrague (2/4) 3', 7'; Vermeulen (1/1) 8'; Fradet (1/3) 13'	Report

Stade Iba Mar Diop, Dakar
Referee: Juan de Bod (South Africa)

1 November 2026
11:36

Argentina	49–0	Uganda
Try: Martos Rodriguez 1' m, 7' c Ledesma 3' m, 14' m Anderson 5' m Kantz 8' m Arechaga 9' m Cocomarola 11' c Zapiola 15' m Con: Federico Kantz (1/3) 7'; Cocomarola (1/1) 11'	Report

Stade Iba Mar Diop, Dakar
Referee: Stephane Rakotonirainy (Madagascar)

1 November 2026
13:58

France	58–0	Uganda
Try: Leroy 1' c, 3' c, 5' m Petitgenet 4' m, 10' c, 15' m Fradet 6' m, 8' m Senga Kouo 8' c Garbajosa 9' m Con: Fradet (2/4) 1', 4'; Leroy (1/2) 8'; Garbajosa (1/2) 11'	Report

Stade Iba Mar Diop, Dakar
Referee: Zaid Isaacs (Nambia)

1 November 2026
14:20

Argentina	31–5	Japan
Try: Cairo 1' m, 8' c, 8' c Cocomarola 6' c Ledesma 9' m Con: Cairo (1/1) 6'; Zapiola (1/2) 8'; Fossati (1/2) 9'	Report	Try: Ishikawa 11' m

Stade Iba Mar Diop, Dakar
Referee: Marx Stiaan (South Africa)

1 November 2026
16:42

Japan	41–7	Uganda
Try: Shiratani 5' c, 8' c Kito 6' m Akimoto 8' m, 11' m Tsuji 9' m Nomura 13' c Con: Suzuki (1/2) 6'; Shiratani (2/4) 8', 14'	Report	Try: Otema 2' c Con: Okole (1/1) 2'

Stade Iba Mar Diop, Dakar
Referee: Stephane Rakotonirainy (Madagascar)

1 November 2026
17:04

Argentina	7–24	France
Try: Kantz 4' c Con: Benedit (1/1) 4'	Report	Try: G. Laharrague 7' m Senga Kouo 8' m Garbajosa 10' c Lefeuvre 12' c Con: Leroy (1/1) 10'; Fradet (1/1) 12'

Stade Iba Mar Diop, Dakar
Referee: Juan de Bod (South Africa)

== Knockout stage ==
=== 5–8th place playoff ===
Semifinals
2 November – Stade Iba Mar Diop
Germany	22
Uganda	0
2 November – Stade Iba Mar Diop
Japan	19
Senegal	5

5th place match
2 November – Stade Iba Mar Diop
Germany	26
Japan	10
7th place match
2 November – Stade Iba Mar Diop
Uganda	5
Senegal	10

==== 5–8th place semifinals ====
2 November 2026
12:58

Germany	22–0	Uganda
Try: Moutsinga 6' c Thonfeld 8' m F. May 13' m Schmekel 14' m Con: Folnovic (1/3) 6'	Report

Stade Iba Mar Diop, Dakar
Referee: Juan de Bod (South Africa)

2 November 2026
13:20

Japan	19–5	Senegal
Try: Koike 1' m, 3' c Nomura 14' c Con: Reo Shiratani (1/2) 3'; Suzuki (1/1) 14'	Report	Try: Cissé 8' m

Stade Iba Mar Diop, Dakar
Referee: Stéphane Rakotonirainy (Madagascar)

==== Seventh place match ====
2 November 2026
15:54

Uganda	5–10	Senegal
Try: Bwambale 2' m	Report	Try: Touré 14' m Diop 17' m

Stade Iba Mar Diop, Dakar
Referee: Zaid Isaacs (Namibia)

==== Fifth place match ====
2 November 2026
16:16

Germany	26–19	Japan
Try: Engels 2' c F. May 6' c Thonfeld 10' m Folnovic 14' c Con: Brauner (2/3) 2', 15'; Niederberger (1/1) 6'	Report	Try: Akimoto 7' c Shiratani 12' m Kito 13' c Con: Suzuki (2/3) 7', 13'

Stade Iba Mar Diop, Dakar
Referee: Marx Stiaan (South Africa)

=== Medal playoff ===
Semifinals
2 November – Stade Iba Mar Diop
South Africa	24
Argentina	12
2 November – Stade Iba Mar Diop
France	58
Canada	0

Gold medal match
2 November – Stade Iba Mar Diop
South Africa	19
France	26
Bronze medal match
2 November – Stade Iba Mar Diop
Argentina	36
Canada	5

==== Semifinals ====
2 November 2026
13:42

South Africa	24–12	Argentina
Try: Delport 9' m Pule 10' m Williams 14' c, 15' c Con: Dave (2/4) 14', 15'	Report	Try: Anderson 4' m Kantz 6' c Con: Kantz (1/1) 7'

Stade Iba Mar Diop, Dakar
Referee: Zaid Isaacs (Namibia)

2 November 2026
14:04

France	58–0	Canada
Try: Delample 2' c Vermeulen 3' m Garbajosa 4' m Lefeuvre 6' c, 7' m, 11' c Fradet 8' m, 12' c Petitgenet 10' m S. Laharrague 15' m Con: Garbajosa (2/3) 2', 6'; S. Laharrague (1/4) 12'; Fradet (1/3) 13'	Report

Stade Iba Mar Diop, Dakar
Referee: Marx Stiaan (South Africa)

==== Bronze medal match ====
2 November 2026
16:38

Argentina	36–5	Canada
Try: Anderson 1' c, 7'c, 10' m Benedit 8' m Galetti Arechaga 12' m Martos Rodriguez 15' c Con: Kantz (2/3) 1', 7'; Fossati (1/1) 15'	Report	Try: Grealy 5' m

Stade Iba Mar Diop, Dakar
Referee: Stéphane Rakotonirainy (Madagascar)

==== Gold medal match ====
2 November 2026
17:05

South Africa	19–26	France
Try: Delport 4' m Dave 12' c, 13' c Con: Dave (2/2) 12', 14'	Report	Try: S. Laharrague 2' c, 6' c Petitgenet 5' c G. Laharrague 15' m Con: S. Laharrague (3/3) 2', 5', 6'

Stade Iba Mar Diop, Dakar
Referee: Juan de Bod (South Africa)

== Final ranking ==
Rank	Team
1st place, gold medalist(s)	France
2nd place, silver medalist(s)	South Africa
3rd place, bronze medalist(s)	Argentina
4	Canada
5	Germany
6	Japan
7	Senegal
8	Uganda

== See also ==
- Rugby sevens at the 2026 Summer Youth Olympics – Women's tournament
