= Triathlon at the 2026 Summer Youth Olympics – Men's =

Boys' at the IV Summer Youth Olympic Games
- Venue: Saly Beach West
- Date: 5 November
- Competitors: 32 from 32 nations

Medalists
1st place, gold medalist(s)		Artur Gaspar	Portugal
2nd place, silver medalist(s)		Emile Vanolst	Luxembourg
3rd place, bronze medalist(s)		Daiki Nishizaki	Japan
3rd place, bronze medalist(s)		Ramazan Ainegov	Kazakhstan

These are the results for the boys' event at the 2026 Summer Youth Olympics.

== Format ==
The event is a continuous competition with no breaks, consisting of 32 athletes. A draw is held at least 24 hours prior to the race to randomly assign start positions, and the first athlete to cross the finish line is declared the winner.

Unlike the 2018 Games, there is no Mixed Relay team event on the programme. The men's individual competition follows a sprint distance format:

Event	Swim	Bike	Run	Total Est. Time
Men's Individual	750m (1 lap)	20.0km (3 laps)	5.0km (3 laps)	~1 hour 10 mins

=== Rules and Procedures ===
- Tie-Breaks: If a photo finish cannot discern a winner, the tie stands and athletes share the position, with the lowest race number listed first.
- Penalties: Violations of World Triathlon rules (e.g., early starts, course shortcuts, or improper transition line mounts) result in warnings, time penalties, or disqualification.
- Appeals: Protests must be announced within 5 minutes and filed in writing within 15 minutes of the official results posting.

== Results ==
Rank	Triathlete	Nation	Swimming	Transit 1	Cycling	Transit 2	Running	Total time	Difference
1st place, gold medalist(s)	Artur Gaspar	Portugal	8:28	0:22	28:19	0:22	15:42	53:13	+0:00
2nd place, silver medalist(s)	Emile Vanolst	Luxembourg	8:30	0:21	28:19	0:26	15:47	53:23	+0:10
3rd place, bronze medalist(s)	Daiki Nishizaki	Japan	8:28	0:20	28:21	0:23	15:55	53:27	+0:14 PF
3rd place, bronze medalist(s)	Ramazan Ainegov	Kazakhstan	8:49	0:19	28:01	0:23	15:55	53:27	+0:14 PF
5	Ludovico Trincheri	Italy	8:27	0:21	28:23	0:23	16:10	53:44	+0:31
6	Alessandro Diego Cortez Delgado	Mexico	8:31	0:21	28:22	0:28	16:24	54:06	+0:53
7	Ondrej Plic	Czech Republic	8:31	0:23	28:13	0:23	16:39	54:09	+0:56
8	Feher Moussa	Saudi Arabia	8:56	0:24	27:53	0:24	16:33	54:10	+0:57
9	Markus Berget Galleberg	Norway	8:55	0:21	27:56	0:25	16:36	54:13	+1:00
10	Raphael Künz	Austria	9:02	0:21	27:47	0:20	16:47	54:17	+1:04
11	Wiktor Korol	Poland	8:49	0:20	28:03	0:25	16:56	54:33	+1:20
12	Gustav Langkær	Denmark	8:28	0:21	28:22	0:24	17:06	54:41	+1:28
13	Abilaykhan Orinbasarov	Uzbekistan	9:00	0:23	27:52	0:23	17:35	55:13	+2:00
14	Ziad Bouchikha	Morocco	8:51	0:22	27:59	0:26	17:40	55:18	+2:05
15	Aaron Jesus Hernandez Morales	Venezuela	8:28	0:22	28:18	0:21	17:54	55:23	+2:10
16	Raimundo Vicente San Martín Naranjo	Chile	8:50	0:21	27:55	0:23	17:57	55:26	+2:13
17	Elias Medina Paolucci	Uruguay	8:48	0:22	32:33	0:26	17:48	55:29	+2:16
18	Aliasghar Keshavarzian	Iran	8:27	0:21	28:26	0:25	18:33	56:12	+2:59
19	Maks Mori	Slovenia	9:00	0:21	27:48	0:21	18:57	56:27	+3:14
20	Youssef Slama	Tunisia	8:40	0:18	28:22	0:25	18:59	56:44	+3:31
21	Lije Huang	Chinese Taipei	8:38	0:22	28:16	0:24	19:37	57:17	+4:04
22	Gianluca Bortoli	Bermuda	8:50	0:24	30:18	0:26	17:57	57:55	+4:42
23	Everts Pikšēns	Latvia	8:48	0:24	28:04	0:25	20:51	58:32	+5:19
24	Mario Brezovski	North Macedonia	8:26	0:21	28:22	0:24	21:33	59:06	+5:53
25	Matthew More	New Zealand	9:14	0:20	32:10	0:24	19:24	1:01:32	+8:19
26	Arvin Abdel Massih	Mozambique	8:50	0:25	32:29	0:26	19:59	1:02:09	+8:56
27	Eduardo Andres Carretero	Puerto Rico	9:20	0:23	33:31	0:24	19:08	1:02:46	+9:33
28	Robert Robin	Kenya	11:43	0:37	35:51	0:59	20:04	1:09:14	+16:01 2P
29	Crisroch Euta Levale	Samoa	11:40	0:23	37:51	0:27	25:01	1:15:22	+22:09
DNF	Johannes Jacob Langford	Namibia	8:48	0:22	32:33	0:26	—	DNF	—
DNF	Josiah Croker	Fiji	9:28	0:25	—	—	—	DNF	—
DSQ	Ousmane Thiaw	Senegal	10:06	0:22	34:59	0:25	18:39	DSQ	—
