= Rugby sevens at the 2026 Summer Youth Olympics – Women's tournament =

2026 Summer Youth Olympics
Tournament details
- Host: Senegal
- Venue: Stade Iba Mar Diop
- Date: 2–3 November
- Teams: 8

Tournament statistics
- Matches played: 20

The women's rugby sevens tournament at the 2026 Summer Youth Olympics will be held at the Stade Iba Mar Diop from 2 to 3 November 2026.

== Group stage ==
All times are Senegal Time (UTC+0).

=== Group A ===
Pos	Team	Pld	W	D	L	PF	PA	PD	TF	TA	B	Pts	Qualification
1	Australia	3	3	0	0	70	20	+50	0	0	0	9	Semifinals
2	Kenya	3	2	0	1	36	22	+14	0	0	0	6	Semifinals
3	China	3	1	0	2	47	40	+7	0	0	2	5	
4	Senegal (H)	3	0	0	3	7	78	−71	0	0	0	0	

Source: Competition Summary
Rules for classification: 1) Points; 2) Head-to-head result; 3) Point difference; 4) Points scored.
(H) Host

2 November 2026
11:30

Kenya	12–5	China
Try: Afande 4' m Mmboga 9' c Con: Murigi (1/2) 9'	Report	Try: Peng S. 14' m

Stade Iba Mar Diop, Dakar
Referee: Halgryn Yohane (South Africa)

2 November 2026
11:52

Australia	32–0	Senegal
Try: Murray 2' m Mackay 5' m Berryman 8' m Buchanan 12' c Shelley 14' m, 15' m Con: Backus (1/3) 13'	Report

Stade Iba Mar Diop, Dakar
Referee: Ayanda Ngombane (South Africa)

2 November 2026
14:26

Kenya	19–0	Senegal
Try: Kerubo 11' c Afande 13' c, 17' m Con: Joy Murigi (1/2) 11'; Wanjiku (1/1) 13'	Report

Stade Iba Mar Diop, Dakar
Referee: Julie Randriarimanana (Madagascar)

2 November 2026
14:48

Australia	21–15	China
Try: Prince 5' c Mackay 6' c Shelley 13' c Con: Henry (2/2) 5', 6'; Backus (1/1) 13'	Report	Try: Zhang C. 9' m Guo X. 9' m Tong K. 11' m

Stade Iba Mar Diop, Dakar
Referee: Bineta Sene (Senegal)

3 November 2026
9:40

China	27–7	Senegal
Try: Zhao Z. 7' m Hu Y. 9' m, 13' m Zhang M. 12' c, 16' m Con: Guo X. (1/2) 12'	Report	Try: Diao 4' c Con: Cissé (1/1) 5'

Stade Iba Mar Diop, Dakar
Referee: Ayanda Ngombane (South Africa)

3 November 2026
10:02

Australia	17–5	Kenya
Try: Henry 3' c Buchanan 8' m Callaghan 12' m Con: Henry (1/1) 3'	Report	Try: Kerubo 2' m

Stade Iba Mar Diop, Dakar
Referee: Bineta Sene (Senegal)

=== Group B ===
Pos	Team	Pld	W	D	L	PF	PA	PD	TF	TA	B	Pts	Qualification
1	Madagascar	3	3	0	0	50	27	+23	0	0	0	9	Semifinals
2	Czech Republic	3	2	0	1	64	57	+7	0	0	0	6	Semifinals
3	United States	3	1	0	2	45	36	+9	0	0	2	5	
4	Spain	3	0	0	3	29	68	−39	0	0	1	1	

Source: Competition Summary
Rules for classification: 1) Points; 2) Head-to-head result; 3) Point difference; 4) Points scored.

2 November 2026
12:14

Spain	17–35	Czech Republic
Try: Rodriguez 5' m Alvarez 8' m Campos 11' c Con: Alvarez (1/2) 11'	Report	Try: Bednářová 2' c, 14' c Oličová 3' c Švábová 8' c, 10' c Con: Bednářová (2/2) 2', 15'; Oličová (2/2) 3', 8'; Kurková (1/1) 10'

Stade Iba Mar Diop, Dakar
Referee: Bineta Sene (Senegal)

2 November 2026
12:36

United States	10–12	Madagascar
Try: Jenks 4' m McGettigan 8' m	Report	Try: Landy 5' c Raveloarisoa 10' m Con: Raveloarisoa (1/1) 5'

Stade Iba Mar Diop, Dakar
Referee: Rejoyce Simeti (Zimbabwe)

2 November 2026
15:10

Spain	12–19	Madagascar
Try: Alvarez 1' c Campos 10' m Con: Alvarez (1/2) 1'	Report	Try: Ftiavananomenjanahary 4' c Landy 6' m Raveloarisoa 11' c Con: Raveloarisoa (2/3) 4', 11'

Stade Iba Mar Diop, Dakar
Referee: Julie Randriarimanana (Madagascar)

2 November 2026
15:32

United States	21–24	Czech Republic
Try: Lomu 1' c, 8' c L. Moala 8' c Con: Lomu (1/1) 2'; Crawford (2/2) 9', 8'	Report	Try: Černá 3' m Švábová 6' c, 13' m Oličová 12' c Con: Kurková (1/2) 9'; Paloučková (1/1) 13'

Stade Iba Mar Diop, Dakar
Referee: Halgryn Yohane (South Africa)

3 November 2026
10:24

Czech Republic	5–19	Madagascar
Try: Laštovková 2' m	Report	Try: Raveloarisoa 3' c Landy 6' c Rakotonindrina 8' m Con: Raveloarisoa (2/3) 3', 7'

Stade Iba Mar Diop, Dakar
Referee: Yohane Halgryn (South Africa)

3 November 2026
10:46

United States	14–0	Spain
Try: Russer 2' c Jenks 5' c Con: Crawford (2/2) 3', 5'	Report

Stade Iba Mar Diop, Dakar
Referee: Rejoyce Simeti (Zimbabwe)

== Knockout stage ==
=== 5–8th place playoff ===
Semifinals
3 November – Stade Iba Mar Diop
China	39
Spain	0
3 November – Stade Iba Mar Diop
United States	14
Senegal	5

5th place match
3 November – Stade Iba Mar Diop
China	36
United States	7
7th place match
3 November – Stade Iba Mar Diop
Spain	27
Senegal	0

==== 5–8th place semifinals ====
3 November 2026
13:08

China	39–0	Spain
Try: Lou J. 2'c, 8' m, 11' m Guo X. 5' m Tong K. 9' m Hu Y. 13' m Liu M. 15' c Con: Guo X. (1/3) 2'; Yang Y. (1/1) 16'	Report

Stade Iba Mar Diop, Dakar
Referee: Julie Randriarimanana (Madagascar)

3 November 2026
13:30

United States	14–5	Senegal
Try: E. Moala 6' c Russer 12' c Con: Crawford (2/2) 6', 13'	Report	Try: Kebe 17' m

Stade Iba Mar Diop, Dakar
Referee: Halgyrn Yohane (South Africa)

==== Seventh place match ====
3 November 2026
15:52

Spain	27–0	Senegal
Try: Campos 6' m Luque 8' m Alvarez 10' m Vargas 12' c Rodriguez 16' m Con: Alvarez (1/5) 13'	Report

Stade Iba Mar Diop, Dakar
Referee: Ayanda Ngombane (South Africa)

==== Fifth place match ====
3 November 2026
16:14

China	36–7	United States
Try: Lou J. 1' m, 9' c Zhao Z. 6' m Hu Y. 7' m, 12' c Peng S. 15' c Con: Hu Y. (1/2) 9'; Tong K. (1/1) 12'; Zhang M. (1/1) 15'	Report	Try: Gandy 9' c Con: Crawford (1/1) 10'

Stade Iba Mar Diop, Dakar
Referee: Rejoyce Simeti (Zimbabwe)

=== Medal playoff ===
Semifinals
3 November – Stade Iba Mar Diop
Australia	19
Czech Republic	10
3 November – Stade Iba Mar Diop
Madagascar	5
Kenya	15

Gold medal match
3 November – Stade Iba Mar Diop
Australia	12
Kenya	17
Bronze medal match
3 November – Stade Iba Mar Diop
Czech Republic	10
Madagascar	26

==== Semifinals ====
3 November 2026
13:52

Australia	19–10	Czech Republic
Try: Prince 1' c, 10' m Mackay 4' c Con: Backus (2/2) 2', 4'	Report	Try: Švábová 6' m Bednářová 8' m

Stade Iba Mar Diop, Dakar
Referee: Julie Randriarimanana (Madagascar)

3 November 2026
14:14

Madagascar	5–15	Kenya
Try: Raveloarisoa 9' m	Report	Try: Afande 2' m Mmboga 6' m, 13' m

Stade Iba Mar Diop, Dakar
Referee: Bineta Sene (Senegal)

==== Bronze medal match ====
3 November 2026
16:36

Czech Republic	10–26	Madagascar
Try: Černá 7' m Bednářová 14' m	Report	Try: Landy 3' c Raveloarisoa 8' c, 9' m Ranaivoson 11' c Con: Ravelaorisoa (3/4) 3', 8', 11'

Stade Iba Mar Diop, Dakar
Referee: Bineta Sene (Senegal)

==== Gold medal match ====
3 November 2026
17:03

Australia	12–17	Kenya
Try: Mackay 1' m Buchanan 12' c Con: Backus (1/1) 13'	Report	Try: Hido 7' m Kerubo 15' c Chemtai 15' m Con: Wanjiku (1/1) 16'

Stade Iba Mar Diop, Dakar
Referee: Halgryn Yohane (South Africa)

== Final ranking ==
Rank	Team
1st place, gold medalist(s)	Kenya
2nd place, silver medalist(s)	Australia
3rd place, bronze medalist(s)	Madagascar
4	Czech Republic
5	China
6	United States
7	Spain
8	Senegal

== See also ==
- Rugby sevens at the 2026 Summer Youth Olympics – Men's tournament
