= Argentina at the 2026 Summer Youth Olympics =

- Flag of Argentina
- IOC code: ARG
- NOC: Argentine Olympic Committee
- Website: www.coarg.org.ar

in Dakar, Senegal October 31, 2026 – November 13, 2026
- Competitors: 42 in 16 sports
- Flag bearers: Cecilia Dieleke & Benjamín Fernández
- Medals Ranked 35th: Gold 2 Silver 0 Bronze 4 Total 6

Summer Youth Olympics appearances (overview)
- 2010; 2014; 2018; 2026

Argentina

Argentina competed at the 2026 Summer Youth Olympics in Dakar, Senegal from October 31 to November 13, 2026. This was the Argentina's fourth appearance at the Youth Olympic Games, after making its debut in 2010.

Swimmer Cecilia Dieleke and gymnast Benjamín Fernández were selected as the flag bearers for the opening ceremony.

== Competitors ==
The following is the list of number of competitors participating at the Games per sport/discipline.

Sport	Men	Women	Total
3x3 basketball	4	0	4
Artistic gymnastics	1	0	1
Athletics	0	2	2
Beach volleyball	0	2	2
Coastal rowing	1	0	0
Equestrian	0	1	1
Fencing	0	1	1
Futsal	10	0	10
Judo	1	0	1
Road cycling	0	1	1
Rugby sevens	12	0	12
Sailing	1	0	1
Skateboarding	1	0	1
Swimming	1	1	2
Table tennis	1	0	1
Wushu	0	1	1
Total	33	9	42

== Medalists ==
Medal	Name	Sport	Event	Date
Gold	Argentina boys' national u-18 futsal team: Santino Sánchez; Agustín Mandaradoni; Axel Barrios; Manuel Cabrera; Lorenzo Sampedro; Lisandro Velásquez; Valentino Martínez; Enzo López; Joaquín Pesl; Ezequiel Henriques	Futsal	Boys' Tournament	12 November
Gold	Cecilia Dieleke	Swimming	Girls' 200 m backstroke	1 November
Bronze	Cecilia Dieleke	Swimming	Girls' 100 m backstroke	3 November
Bronze	Cecilia Dieleke	Swimming	Girls' 50 m backstroke	5 November
Bronze	Thiago Carvallo	Judo	Men's –66kg	1 November
Bronze	Argentina boys' national rugby sevens team: Santiago Abbondati; Federico Anderson; Ramón Benedit; Gonzalo Cairo; Joaquín Cocomarola; Benjamín Fossati; Tomás Galetti; Federico Kantz; Felipe Ledesma; Juan Bautista Maris; Santiago Martos; Joaquín Zapiola	Rugby Sevens	Boys' Tournament	2 November

== 3x3 basketball ==
Argentina entered a team for the men's tournament as one of the three participating teams from the Americas.

Summary

Event	Pool play		Group Rank	Quarterfinal	Semifinal	Final / BM	
Event	Opposition Score	Opposition Score	Group Rank	Opposition Score	Opposition Score	Opposition Score	Rank
Men's tournament	Venezuela; W 17 - 14	Mongolia; W 21 - 10	1 Q	Lithuania; L 19 - 21	Did not advance		

Roster

- Igor Joloidovsky
- Thiago Montes
- Ezequiel Bargot
- Enzo Roth

== Artistic gymnastics ==
Argentina entered one male gymnast.

Qualifiers

Athlete	Event	Qualifiers									
Athlete	Event	Apparatus								Total	Rank
Athlete	Event	F	PH	R	V			PB	HB	Total	Rank
Athlete	Event	F	PH	R	1	2	Average	PB	HB	Total	Rank
Benjamín Fernández	All-around	12.966	11.633	11.466	13.833			11.433	12.766	74.097	13 Q

Final

Athlete	Event	Final									
Athlete	Event	Apparatus								Total	Rank
Athlete	Event	F	PH	R	V			PB	HB	Total	Rank
Athlete	Event	F	PH	R	1	2	Average	PB	HB	Total	Rank
Benjamín Fernández	All-around	10.666	12.266	10.966	14.133			10.733	12.766	71.530	15

== Athletics ==
Argentina entered two female athletes for the track and road events.

=== Track & road events ===
Women

Athlete	Event	Heat		Semifinal		Final	
Athlete	Event	Result	Rank	Result	Rank	Result	Rank
Irene Pernía	1500 m	—N/a				4:39.55	7
Zoe Gorski	3000 m	—N/a				9:47.83	4

== Beach volleyball ==
Argentina received a quota place for the women's tournament.

Summary

Team	Event	Group stage				Round of 16	Quarterfinals	Semifinals	Final / PG / BM	
Team	Event	Opposition Result	Opposition Result	Opposition Result	Rank	Opposition Result	Opposition Result	Opposition Result	Opposition Result	Rank
Ángeles Frascaroli; Isabella García	Women's tournament	Berthaudeau / Mir (FRA); W 21–14, 20-22, 15-13	Cassidy / Leon Guerrero (GUM); W 21–15, 21–12	Mabjaia / Machava (MOZ); W 21–9, 21-13	1 Q	Paniagua / Reyes Montero (DOM); W 21–16, 21-12	Coretti / Lafuenti (ITA); L 19-21, 15-21	Did not advance		

== Coastal rowing ==
Argentina entered one male rower.

Men

Athlete	Event	Qualifying round				Round of 16	Quarterfinals	Semifinals	Final / BM	
Athlete	Event	Time Trial 1	Position	Time Trial 2	Position	Opposition Result	Opposition Result	Opposition Result	Opposition Result	Rank
Joaquín Pare	Solo	2:55.38	23	2:41.46	17	Did not advance				

== Equestrian ==
Argentina received a quota place as one of the four invited NOCs from South America.

Athlete	Horse	Event	Penalties round A			Penalties round B			Qualifiers positions	Final		
Athlete	Horse	Event	Jump	Time	Rank	Jump	Time	Rank	Qualifiers positions	Jump	Time	Rank
María Eiras	Haloha Kandooma	Individual jumping	4	0	5	4	0	12	6 Q	4	0	12

== Fencing ==
Argentina entered one female athlete.

Athlete	Event	Pool 2							Round of 16	Quarterfinal	Semifinal	Final / BM	
Athlete	Event	Match 1	Match 2	Match 3	Match 4	Match 5	Match 6	Pool position	Opposition Score	Opposition Score	Opposition Score	Opposition Score	Rank
Catalina Borrelli	Women's sabre	Villacorta (ESA); W 5-2	Iriarte (BOL); W 5-3	Kinda (BUR); W 5-1	Jeon (KOR); L 3-5	Camara (GUI); W 5-1	Fraga (BRA); W 5-2	4 Q (5-1)	García (HON); W 15-3	Fraga (BRA); W 15-5	Jeon (KOR); L 9-15	Utebaeva (UZB); L 13-15	4

== Futsal ==
Argentina entered a team for the men's tournament.

Summary

Event	Group stage				Semifinal	Final / BM	
Event	Opposition Score	Opposition Score	Opposition Score	Group Rank	Opposition Score	Opposition Score	Rank
Men's tournament	Senegal; W 9-2	Afghanistan; W 2-1	Panama; W 9-1	1 Q	Morocco; W 4-2	Portugal; W 2-1	1st place, gold medalist(s)

Roster

- Santino Sánchez
- Agustín Mandaradoni
- Axel Barrios
- Manuel Cabrera
- Lorenzo Sampedro
- Lisandro Velásquez
- Valentino Martínez
- Enzo López
- Joaquín Pesl
- Ezequiel Henriques

== Judo ==
Argentina entered one male judoka based on the available quotas assigned by the International Judo Federation.

Athlete	Event	Round of 16	Quarterfinals	Semifinals / Repechage 1	Repechage 2	Final / BM	
Athlete	Event	Opposition Result	Opposition Result	Opposition Result	Opposition Result	Opposition Result	Rank
Thiago Carvallo	Men's -66 kg	Pinto (MOZ); W 100-0	Mati (CAN); L 0-101	Pinto (STP); W 100-0	Cohen (ISR); W 1-0 y	Mildner (HUN); W 100-0	3rd place, bronze medalist(s)

== Road cycling ==
Argentina entered one female athlete.

Women

Athlete	Event	Time	Rank
Julia Lambert	Road race	1:42:06	32
Julia Lambert	Time trial	13:35.96	31

== Rugby sevens ==
Argentina entered a team for the men's tournament.

Summary

Event	Group stage				Semifinal	Final / BM	
Event	Opposition Score	Opposition Score	Opposition Score	Group Rank	Opposition Score	Opposition Score	Rank
Men's tournament	Uganda; W 49-0	Japan; W 31-5	France; L 7-24	2 Q	South Africa; L 12-24	Canada; W 36-5	3rd place, bronze medalist(s)

Roster

- Santiago Abbondati
- Federico Anderson
- Ramón Benedit
- Gonzalo Cairo
- Joaquín Cocomarola
- Benjamín Fossati
- Tomás Galetti
- Federico Kantz
- Felipe Ledesma
- Juan Bautista Maris
- Santiago Martos
- Joaquín Zapiola

== Sailing ==
Argentina entered one male athlete.

Athlete	Event	Opening Series – Points per Race														Total points	Net points	Final rank
Athlete	Event	1	2	3	4	5	6	7	8	9	10	11	12	13	14	Total points	Net points	Final rank
Agustín Hoffmann	Men's windsurfing	12	16	18	~~19~~	19	19	14	18	18	16	19	14	17	19	238	131	19

== Skateboarding ==
Argentina entered one male athlete based on available quotas.

Athlete	Event	Heat		Final	
Athlete	Event	Result	Rank	Result	Rank
Joaquín Rodríguez	Men's street	110.63	9	Did not advanced	

== Swimming ==
Argentina entered two swimmers, one male and one female.

Athlete	Event	Heat		Final	
Athlete	Event	Time	Rank	Time	Rank
Thiago Pizzini	100 m freestyle	53.56	25	Did not advance	
Thiago Pizzini	200 m freestyle	1:54.81	14	Did not advance	
Thiago Pizzini	400 m freestyle	—N/a		3:59.10	7
Cecilia Dieleke	50 m freestyle	26.77	9	Did not advance	
Cecilia Dieleke	50 m backstroke	29.29	4 q	28.83	3rd place, bronze medalist(s)
Cecilia Dieleke	100 m backstroke	1:02.87	3 q	1:00.83	3rd place, bronze medalist(s)
Cecilia Dieleke	200 m backstroke	2:13.73	1 q	2:10.05	1st place, gold medalist(s)

== Table tennis ==
Argentina entered one male athlete.

Athlete	Event	Group 1 - Match 1	Group 1 - Match 2	Group 1 - Match 3	Group position	Round of 16	Quarterfinals	Semifinals	Final / BM	
Athlete	Event	Opposition Result	Opposition Result	Opposition Result	Group position	Opposition Result	Opposition Result	Opposition Result	Opposition Result	Rank
Agustín Asmu	Men's singles	Kawakami (JPN); L 0-3 (5-11, 5-11, 7-11)	Abdourahaman (BEN); W 3-0 (11-5, 11-6, 11-5)	Okano (BRA); W 3-2 (4-11, 11-5, 11-8, 2-11, 11-1)	2 Q	Li (CHN); L 0-4 (3-11, 5-11, 12-14, 4-11	Did not advance			

== Wushu ==
Argentina entered one female athlete after quotas were assigned by the International Wushu Federation.

Athlete	Event	Gunshu preliminary routine		Changquan preliminary routine		Total Points	Preliminary Rank	Gunshu final routine		Changquan final routine		Total Points	Final Rank
Athlete	Event	Points	Rank	Points	Rank	Total Points	Preliminary Rank	Points	Rank	Points	Rank	Total Points	Final Rank
Ludmila Rosales	Women's changquan combined	7.690	9	7.496	9	15.186	9	Did not advance					9
