= Athletics at the 2026 Summer Youth Olympics – Men's 400 metres hurdles =

Athletics event at the 2026 Summer Youth Olympics

Men's 400 metres hurdles at the IV Summer Youth Olympic Games
- Venue: Complexe Iba Mar Diop
- Dates: 9–10 November 2026
- Competitors: 16 from 16 nations

Medalists
1st place, gold medalist(s)		Jaeden Campbell	Jamaica
2nd place, silver medalist(s)		Noriyuki Takano	Japan
3rd place, bronze medalist(s)		Zsombor Klucsik	Austria

The men's 400 metres hurdles event at the 2026 Summer Youth Olympics was held on 9 and 10 November at the Complexe Iba Mar Diop in Dakar, Senegal. Jamaica's Jaeden Campbell won the gold medal in the final with a time of 50.60 seconds.

The event consisted of two phases: the semi-finals and the final. The first four athletes in each semi-final and the next fastest athlete qualified for the final.

== Schedule ==
The competition schedule listed the semi-finals on 9 November and the final on 10 November 2026.

All times are local (UTC).

Date	Time	Round
9 November 2026	14:05	Semi-finals
10 November 2026	14:00	Final

== Results ==
=== Semi-finals ===
The semi-finals were held on 9 November 2026. The first four athletes in each semi-final (Q) and the next fastest athlete (q) qualified for the final.

Rank	Bib	Athlete	Nation	Semi-final	Position	Result	Notes
1	390	Jaeden Campbell	Jamaica	SF1	1	51.73	Q
2	396	Noriyuki Takano	Japan	SF1	2	52.49	Q, PB
3	307	Zsombor Klucsik	Austria	SF1	3	52.64	Q
4	387	Davide Crisci	Italy	SF2	1	52.65	Q
5	458	Daryen Ko	Singapore	SF1	4	52.87	Q
6	320	Kevin Tobias Aguero	Brazil	SF2	2	52.94	Q
7	325	Hussein Adou Marianno	Republic of the Congo	SF1	5	52.95	q, PB
8	372	Stephen Oduro Jr.	Ghana	SF2	3	53.03	Q, PB
9	332	Tengfei Wang	China	SF2	4	53.19	Q
10	480	Emre Basut	Turkey	SF1	6	53.24	
11	412	Zacharry Lawrence	Malaysia	SF1	7	53.74	PB
12	346	Melvin Torres	Dominican Republic	SF1	8	54.34	PB
13	487	Felipe Malgor	Uruguay	SF2	5	56.66	
14	366	Roko Ilaisa Tabete	Fiji	SF2	6	57.79	PB
15	421	Andrej Dukanovic	Montenegro	SF2	7	58.49	
	431	Gift Oghenerunor	Nigeria	SF2		DNS	

=== Final ===
The final was held on 10 November 2026.

Rank	Bib	Athlete	Nation	Result	Reaction time	Remark
1st place, gold medalist(s)	390	Jaeden Campbell	Jamaica	50.60	0.229	PB
2nd place, silver medalist(s)	396	Noriyuki Takano	Japan	50.88	0.160	PB
3rd place, bronze medalist(s)	307	Zsombor Klucsik	Austria	51.59	0.170	
4	387	Davide Crisci	Italy	51.66	0.151	PB
5	332	Wang Tengfei	China	52.12	0.164	
6	458	Daryen Ko	Singapore	52.16	0.190	PB
7	325	Hussein Adou Marianno	Republic of the Congo	52.70	0.277	PB
8	320	Kevin Tobias Aguero	Brazil	52.99	0.139	
9	372	Stephen Oduro Jr.	Ghana	53.10	0.189	
