= Antra =

Antra or ANTRA may refer to:

- Associação Nacional de Travestis e Transexuais, Brazilian human rights organization
- Antra Records, American rap label founded by Kurupt
- Antra Liedskalniņa (1930–2000), Latvian actress

== See also ==
- Antrum (disambiguation)
- Antras (disambiguation)
