= Beach wrestling at the 2026 Summer Youth Olympics – Women's 65 kg =

Wrestling event at the 2026 Summer Youth Olympics

Women's 65 kg at the 2026 Summer Youth Olympics
- Venue: Saly Beach West
- Date: 8 November 2026
- Competitors: 12 from 12 nations

Medalists
gold medal	Yolayni Rosado Valerio	Dominican Republic
silver medal	Graciela Eningo	Spain
bronze medal	Anujin Erkhembataar	Mongolia

The women's 65 kg competition in beach wrestling at the 2026 Summer Youth Olympics was held on 8 November 2026 at Saly Beach West in Saly, Senegal.

== Competition format ==
The twelve wrestlers were divided into three groups of four. Wrestlers competed in a round-robin format within their groups. The winner of each group and the best second-placed wrestler advanced to the semifinals. The semifinal winners competed for the gold medal, while the semifinal losers competed for the bronze medal.

== Schedule ==
All times are local (UTC−3).

Date	Event
8 November 2026	Group stage, semifinals and medal matches

== Results ==
=== Legend ===
- Q – Qualified for semifinals as group winner
- q – Qualified for semifinals as best second-placed wrestler

=== Results codes ===
Code	Meaning
VFA	Victory by a 3-point takedown or throw, without any point scored by the opponent
VFA1	Victory by a 3-point takedown or throw, with point(s) scored by the opponent
VPO	Victory with less than 3 points
VSU	Victory with 3 points but without a 3-point takedown or throw, without any point scored by the opponent
VSU1	Victory with 3 points but without a 3-point takedown or throw, with point(s) scored by the opponent

=== Group stage ===
The twelve Wrestlers competed in 3 groups.

==== Group A ====
Match	Wrestler	NOC	Technical points	Classification points	Result
119	Yolayni Rosado Valerio	Dominican Republic	2	1	VPO
119	Antra	India	1	0	VPO
120	Jemimah Nakhumicha Wanjala	Kenya	2	1	VFA1
120	Graciela Eningo	Spain	4	4	VFA1
131	Yolayni Rosado Valerio	Dominican Republic	4	4	VFA1
131	Jemimah Nakhumicha Wanjala	Kenya	2	1	VFA1
132	Antra	India	0	0	VPO
132	Graciela Eningo	Spain	2	1	VPO
167	Yolayni Rosado Valerio	Dominican Republic	3	2	VSU1
167	Graciela Eningo	Spain	2	1	VSU1
168	Antra	India	4	4	VFA
168	Jemimah Nakhumicha Wanjala	Kenya	0	0	VFA

Rank	Wrestler	NOC	Matches won	Classification points	Technical points scored	Technical points conceded	Draw number	Qualification
1	Yolayni Rosado Valerio	Dominican Republic	3	7	9	5	37	Q
2	Graciela Eningo	Spain	2	6	8	5	255	q
3	Antra	India	1	4	5	4	159	
4	Jemimah Nakhumicha Wanjala	Kenya	0	2	4	12	169	

==== Group B ====
Match	Wrestler	NOC	Technical points	Classification points	Result
121	Olivia Sandin Amblard	France	0	0	VPO
121	Malak Abdelgalil	Egypt	2	1	VPO
122	Ana Rachiteanu	Moldova	2	1	VFA1
122	Iryna Bukhtina	Ukraine	4	4	VFA1
133	Olivia Sandin Amblard	France	0	0	VSU
133	Ana Rachiteanu	Moldova	3	2	VSU
134	Malak Abdelgalil	Egypt	3	2	VSU
134	Iryna Bukhtina	Ukraine	0	0	VSU
169	Olivia Sandin Amblard	France	1	1	VSU1
169	Iryna Bukhtina	Ukraine	4	2	VSU1
170	Malak Abdelgalil	Egypt	3	2	VSU1
170	Ana Rachiteanu	Moldova	2	1	VSU1

Rank	Wrestler	NOC	Matches won	Classification points	Technical points scored	Technical points conceded	Draw number	Qualification
1	Malak Abdelgalil	Egypt	3	5	8	2	97	Q
2	Iryna Bukhtina	Ukraine	2	6	8	6	248	
3	Ana Rachiteanu	Moldova	1	4	7	7	173	
4	Olivia Sandin Amblard	France	0	1	1	9	53	

==== Group C ====
Match	Wrestler	NOC	Technical points	Classification points	Result
123	Aleia Apostol	United States	3	4	VFA
123	Mery Manga	Senegal	0	0	VFA
124	Emanuela Rados	Croatia	0	0	VSU
124	Anujin Erkhembataar	Mongolia	3	2	VSU
135	Aleia Apostol	United States	3	2	VSU
135	Emanuela Rados	Croatia	0	0	VSU
136	Mery Manga	Senegal	0	0	VSU
136	Anujin Erkhembataar	Mongolia	3	2	VSU
171	Aleia Apostol	United States	0	0	VFA
171	Anujin Erkhembataar	Mongolia	4	4	VFA
172	Mery Manga	Senegal	2	1	VPO
172	Emanuela Rados	Croatia	0	0	VPO

Rank	Wrestler	NOC	Matches won	Classification points	Technical points scored	Technical points conceded	Draw number	Qualification
1	Anujin Erkhembataar	Mongolia	3	8	10	0	217	Q
2	Aleia Apostol	United States	2	6	6	4	64	
3	Mery Manga	Senegal	1	1	2	6	79	
4	Emanuela Rados	Croatia	0	0	0	8	196	

=== Finals ===
The Winner of each group and best of rest are qualified for Semis

Semifinals
1	Yolayni Rosado Valerio (DOM)	2
4	Anujin Erkhembataar (MGL)	1
3	Malak Abdelgalil (EGY)	0
2	Graciela Eningo (ESP)	1

Final
Yolayni Rosado Valerio (DOM)	2
Graciela Eningo (ESP)	1

Bronze-medal match
Anujin Erkhembataar (MGL)	4
Malak Abdelgalil (EGY)	1

=== Final classification ===
Rank	Wrestler	NOC
1	Yolayni Rosado Valerio	Dominican Republic
2	Graciela Eningo	Spain
3	Anujin Erkhembataar	Mongolia
4	Malak Abdelgalil	Egypt
5	Aleia Apostol	United States
6	Iryna Bukhtina	Ukraine
7	Antra	India
8	Ana Rachiteanu	Moldova
9	Mery Manga	Senegal
10	Jemimah Nakhumicha Wanjala	Kenya
11	Olivia Sandin Amblard	France
12	Emanuela Rados	Croatia
