= Taekwondo at the 2026 Summer Youth Olympics – Women's 49 kg =

Women's 49 kg at the IV Summer Youth Olympic Games
- Venue: Complexe Iba Mar Diop
- Date: 10 November
- Competitors: 10 from 10 nations

Medalists
1st place, gold medalist(s)		Lee Si-woo	South Korea
2nd place, silver medalist(s)		Mackenzie MacDonald	Australia
3rd place, bronze medalist(s)		Housseina Zaza Mamoudou	Niger
3rd place, bronze medalist(s)		Ioanna Konstantinou	Cyprus

The women's' 49 kg competition at the 2026 Summer Youth Olympics was held on 10 November at the Complexe Iba Mar Diop.

== Schedule ==
All times are local (UTC+0).

Date	Time	Round
Monday, 9 November 2026	11:00; 11:48; 16:00; 17:00	Round of 16; Quarterfinals; Semifinals; Final

== Bracket ==
Round of 16
Housseina Zaza Mamaoudou (NIG)	15	18
Veronika Szentgyörgyi (HUN)	0	11
Françoise Uwamahoro (RWA)	0	2
Mackenzie MacDonald (AUS)	15	17

Quarterfinals
Aina Kirtselis (FIN)	16	11
Housseina Zaza Mamaoudou (NIG)	24	12
Viktorija Latiša (LAT)	12	0
Lee Si-woo (KOR)	23	18
Ioanna Konstantinou (CYP)	17	16
Lourance Numukiza (EOR)	0	2
Mackenzie MacDonald (AUS)	12	8
Betania Medina (PAR)	1	4

Semifinals
Housseina Zaza Mamaoudou (NIG)	8	6
Lee Si-woo (KOR)	11	7
Ioanna Konstantinou (CYP)	5	7	2
Mackenzie MacDonald (AUS)	3	8	11

Final
Lee Si-woo (KOR)	16	13
Mackenzie MacDonald (AUS)	1	0
