= Beach handball at the 2026 Summer Youth Olympics – Men's tournament =

2026 Summer Youth Olympics
Tournament details
- Host country: Senegal
- Venue: Saly
- Dates: 9–13 November
- Teams: 8 (from 6 confederations)

Final positions
- Champions: Germany (1st title)
- Runners-up: Brazil
- Third place: Senegal
- Fourth place: Hungary

The men's beach handball tournament at the 2026 Summer Youth Olympics was held from 9 to 13 November 2026 at the Saly Beach.

== Preliminary round ==
All times are local (UTC+0).

=== Group A ===
Pos	Team	Pld	W	L	Pts	SW	SL	SR	SPW	SPL	SPR	Qualification
1	Germany	3	3	0	6	6	0	MAX	134	55	2.436	Quarterfinals
2	Tunisia	3	2	1	4	2	4	0.500	96	125	0.768	Quarterfinals
3	Thailand	3	1	2	2	4	2	2.000	107	92	1.163	Quarterfinals
4	Cook Islands	3	0	3	0	0	6	0.000	78	143	0.545	Quarterfinals

Rules for classification: 1) Points; 2) Head-to-head points; 3) Head-to-head set difference; 4) Head-to-head points won; 5) Set difference; 6) Points won; 7) Draw.

9 November 2026; 10:20	Tunisia	2–0	Cook Islands	Centre Court
9 November 2026; 10:20	(22–10, 18–16); Report			Centre Court

9 November 2026; 10:20	Germany	2–0	Thailand	Court 2
9 November 2026; 10:20	(22–11, 20–8); Report			Court 2

9 November 2026; 15:00	Thailand	0–2	Tunisia	Court 3
9 November 2026; 15:00	(16–28, 12–19); Report			Court 3

9 November 2026; 15:50	Cook Islands	0–2	Germany	Centre Court
9 November 2026; 15:50	(4–30, 12–24); Report			Centre Court

10 November 2026; 11:40	Germany	2–0	Tunisia	Court 2
10 November 2026; 11:40	(19–12, 19–8); Report			Court 2

10 November 2026; 11:40	Thailand	2–0	Cook Islands	Centre Court
10 November 2026; 11:40	(21–18, 28–18); Report			Centre Court

=== Group B ===
Pos	Team	Pld	W	L	Pts	SW	SL	SR	SPW	SPL	SPR	Qualification
1	Brazil	3	3	0	6	6	1	6.000	139	101	1.376	Quarterfinals
2	Senegal (H)	3	2	1	4	5	3	1.667	149	126	1.183	Quarterfinals
3	Hungary	3	1	2	2	3	4	0.750	129	122	1.057	Quarterfinals
4	Puerto Rico	3	0	3	0	0	6	0.000	78	146	0.534	Quarterfinals

Rules for classification: 1) Points; 2) Head-to-head points; 3) Head-to-head set difference; 4) Head-to-head points won; 5) Set difference; 6) Points won; 7) Draw.
(H) Host

9 November 2026; 12:00	Hungary	1–2	Senegal	Court 2
9 November 2026; 12:00	(20–26, 24–22, 8–10); Report			Court 2

9 November 2026; 12:00	Brazil	2–0	Puerto Rico	Centre Court
9 November 2026; 12:00	(22–16, 31–10); Report			Centre Court

9 November 2026; 16:40	Hungary	2–0	Puerto Rico	Centre Court
9 November 2026; 16:40	(22–12, 21–12); Report			Centre Court

9 November 2026; 16:40	Senegal	1–2	Brazil	Court 2
9 November 2026; 16:40	(14–12, 21–24, 6–10); Report			Court 2

10 November 2026; 11:40	Brazil	2–0	Hungary	Centre Court
10 November 2026; 11:40	(22–18, 18–16); Report			Centre Court

10 November 2026; 11:40	Puerto Rico	0–2	Senegal	Court 2
10 November 2026; 11:40	(12–24, 16–26); Report			Court 2

== Knockout stage ==
=== Bracket ===
Gold medal bracket

Quarter-finals
11 November
Germany	2
Puerto Rico	0
11 November
Senegal	2
Thailand	0
11 November
Tunisia	1
Hungary	2
11 November
Brazil	2
Cook Islands	0

Semi-finals
12 November
Germany	2
Senegal	1
12 November
Hungary	1
Brazil	2

Final
13 November
Germany	2
Brazil	0
Third place
13 November
Senegal	2
Hungary	1

Fifth place bracket

5–8th place semifinals
11 November
Puerto Rico	1
Thailand	2
11 November
Tunisia	2
Cook Islands	0

Fifth place game
12 November
Thailand	0
Tunisia	2
Seventh place game
12 November
Puerto Rico	1
Cook Islands	2

=== Quarterfinals ===
11 November 2026; 10:50	Germany	2–0	Puerto Rico	Centre Court
11 November 2026; 10:50	(18–6, 28–9); Report			Centre Court

11 November 2026; 10:50	Tunisia	1–2	Hungary	Court 2
11 November 2026; 10:50	(18–19, 22–20, 2–6); Report			Court 2

11 November 2026; 11:40	Senegal	2–0	Thailand	Centre Court
11 November 2026; 11:40	(20–19, 20–16); Report			Centre Court

11 November 2026; 11:40	Brazil	2–0	Cook Islands	Court 2
11 November 2026; 11:40	(36–20, 36–7); Report			Court 2

=== 5–8th place semifinals ===
11 November 2026; 16:20	Puerto Rico	1–2	Thailand	Centre Court
11 November 2026; 16:20	(18–27, 23–18, 8–9); Report			Centre Court

11 November 2026; 16:20	Tunisia	2–0	Cook Islands	Court 2
11 November 2026; 16:20	(22–16, 28–22); Report			Court 2

=== Semifinals ===
12 November 2026; 11:40	Germany	2–1	Senegal	Centre Court
12 November 2026; 11:40	(13–12, 12–13, 10–8); Report			Centre Court

12 November 2026; 12:30	Hungary	1–2	Brazil	Centre Court
12 November 2026; 12:30	(20–22, 24–18, 14–16); Report			Centre Court

=== Seventh place game ===
12 November 2026; 16:20	Puerto Rico	1–2	Cook Islands	Court 2
12 November 2026; 16:20	(20–14, 16–17, 2–5); Report			Court 2

=== Fifth place game ===
12 November 2026; 16:20	Thailand	0–2	Tunisia	Centre Court
12 November 2026; 16:20	(14–18, 10–20); Report			Centre Court

=== Third place game ===
13 November 2026; 10:30	Senegal	2–1	Hungary	Centre Court
13 November 2026; 10:30	(20–18, 16–22, 9–6); Report			Centre Court

=== Gold medal game ===
13 November 2026; 12:30	Germany	2–0	Brazil	Centre Court
13 November 2026; 12:30	(29–20, 15–14); Report			Centre Court

== Final ranking ==
Rank	Team
1st place, gold medalist(s)	Germany
2nd place, silver medalist(s)	Brazil
3rd place, bronze medalist(s)	Senegal
4	Hungary
5	Tunisia
6	Thailand
7	Cook Islands
8	Puerto Rico
