= Sailing at the 2014 Summer Youth Olympics – Boys' Byte CII =

Boys' Byte CII at the II Summer Youth Olympic Games
- Venue: Jinniu Lake
- Dates: August 18–23, 2014
- Competitors: 30 from 30 nations

Medalists
1st place, gold medalist(s)		Bernie Chin	Singapore
2nd place, silver medalist(s)		Rodolfo Pires	Portugal
3rd place, bronze medalist(s)		Jonatán Vadnai	Hungary

Boys' Byte CII class competition at the 2014 Summer Youth Olympics in Nanjing took place from August 18 to August 23 at Jinniu Lake. 30 sailors competed in this dinghy competition.

Eight races were scheduled.

== Medalists ==
Gold	Bernie Chin; Singapore
Silver	Rodolfo Pires; Portugal
Bronze	Jonatán Vadnai; Hungary

== Results ==
Race M is the medal race.

Rank	Athlete	Race								Net Points
Rank	Athlete	1	2	3	4	5	6	7	M	Net Points
1st place, gold medalist(s)	Bernie Chin (SGP)	21	~~DNF~~	1	2	1	5	3	5	38
2nd place, silver medalist(s)	Rodolfo Pires (POR)	16	2	8	4	9	1	~~26~~	7	47
3rd place, bronze medalist(s)	Jonatán Vadnai (HUN)	~~22~~	5	11	10	8	11	1	4	50
4	Henry Marshall (USA)	9	~~12~~	3	11	10	10	6	2	51
5	Apiwat Sringam (THA)	10	~~13~~	9	5	4	2	13	8	51
6	Pedro Correa (BRA)	1	4	2	3	20	18	9	14	51
7	Pavle Živanović (CRO)	5	8	7	6	21	7	11	15	59
8	Asri Azman (MAS)	~~DSQ~~	1	DNE	7	2	8	10	1	60
9	Romen Richard (FRA)	~~14~~	6	10	8	11	4	16	9	62
10	Alistair Gifford (NZL)	7	16	4	16	5	9	4	~~19~~	64
11	Justin Vittecoq (CAN)	2	11	18	17	3	3	12	~~20~~	68
12	Clemente Seguel (CHI)	6	7	13	~~25~~	18	6	15	11	76
13	Tom Cunich (AUS)	3	15	~~24~~	24	7	13	14	3	79
14	Scott McKenzie (ISV)	19	19	5	1	6	19	~~29~~	22	91
15	Angello Giuria (PER)	4	3	14	20	15	23	~~24~~	17	96
16	Arvid Nordquist (SWE)	~~23~~	9	17	15	17	20	5	18	101
17	Pablo Bertran (CAY)	18	~~27~~	19	22	23	15	2	3	105
18	Vittorio Gallinaro (ITA)	17	23	6 (6)	19	22	~~24~~	8	10	105
19	Ahmad Zainuddin (INA)	12	10	20	~~21~~	19	17	17	121	107
20	Luc Chevrier (LCA)	13	17	12	14	14	16	~~25~~	24	110
21	Scipio Houtman (NED)	8	18	22	12	25	~~26~~	21	16	122
22	Samuel Morrell (IVB)	24	14	25	18	12	~~28~~	19	13	125
23	Paul De Souza (BAH)	11	24	21	26	13	14	18	~~29~~	130
24	Rhone Heweth Leon Kirby (ANT)	~~DNE~~	22	16	9	24	27	7	23	132
25	Calvin Gibbs (RSA)	15	20	15	23	16	25	22	~~26~~	137
26	Amine Guedim (ALG)	20	25	23	13	~~DNF~~	22	23	25	151
27	Giorgios Papadopoulos Kouklakis (GRE)	25	26	26	~~29~~	26	12	20	21	156
28	Hamad Al-Hammadi (UAE)	27	21	~~29~~	27	27	21	27	28	178
29	Joshua Ioane (COK)	26	28	27	28	28	~~29~~	28	27	192
30	Teariki Numa (PNG)	28	29	28	~~30~~	29	30	30	30	204

=== Notes ===
Scoring abbreviations are defined as follows:

- DSQ – Disqualified
- DNF – Did Not Finish
- DNE – Did Not Enter
- BFD – Black Flag Disqualification
