= Futsal at the 2026 Summer Youth Olympics – Men's tournament =

2026 Summer Youth Olympics men's futsal tournament
Tournament details
- Host country: Senegal
- Dates: 2–12 November
- Teams: 8 (from 6 confederations)
- Venues: 2 (in 2 host cities)

Final positions
- Champions: Argentina (1st title)
- Runners-up: Portugal
- Third place: Morocco
- Fourth place: Afghanistan

Tournament statistics
- Matches played: 16
- Goals scored: 113 (7.06 per match)
- Top scorer(s): (Morocco) Alae Aït Challa (7 goals)

The men's futsal tournament at the 2026 Summer Youth Olympics took place in Dakar and Diamniadio, Senegal between 2–12 November 2026.

== Group stage ==
=== Group A ===
Pos	Team	Pld	W	W+	WP	L	GF	GA	GD	Pts	Qualification
1	Argentina	3	3	0	0	0	20	4	+16	9	Semifinals
2	Afghanistan	3	2	0	0	1	12	2	+10	6	Semifinals
3	Senegal (H)	3	1	0	0	2	7	19	−12	3	
4	Panama	3	0	0	0	3	5	19	−14	0	

Source: Dakar 2026
(H) Host
2 November 2026
15:30

Panama	0–5	Afghanistan
	Report	Karimi 0'33"; Nazari 3'28"; Hassani 23'25"; Ahmadi 23'40"; Akbari 37'49"

CID Arena
Referee: Jernej Petek (SLO), Turekhan Tursumbayev (KAZ)
2 November 2026
17:30

Senegal	2–9	Argentina
Camara 18'38"; Diagne 36'06"	Report	López 3'49", 7'18"; Martínez 8'46", 27'06"; Barrios 10'08"; Sampedro 29'04", 38'50"; Henriques 33'03"; Pesl 35'29"

CID Arena
Referee: Ali Al-Ayat (LBA), Feliciano Fariña (PAR)

4 November 2026
15:30

Afghanistan	1–2	Argentina
Ahmadi 17'19"	Report	Esmaeili 6'52" (o.g.); Martínez 39'20"

CID Arena
Referee: Laurentiu Ilie (SMR), Servando Berna (USA)
4 November 2026
17:30

Senegal	5–4	Panama
Diakhaté 7'11", 8'35"; Diagne 20'43", 39'31"; Camara 34'06"	Report	Ramírez 30'02"; Almoguea 30'39"; Mosquera 32'24"; Saravia 38'42"

CID Arena
Referee: Arnaud Llambrich (FRA), Federico Piccardo (URU)

7 November 2026
15:30

Argentina	9–1	Panama
Martínez 4'30", 10'50" (pen.), 13'53"; Pesl 7'10"; Velásquez 9'58"; Henriques 12'13", 29'53"; Sampedro 12'48", 19'55"	Report	Mosquera 39'44"

Dakar Arena
Referee: Yahya Al-Athwani (KSA), Takeshi Fujita (JPN)
7 November 2026
17:30

Afghanistan	6–0	Senegal
Ahmadi 0'31", 6'25", 36'30"; Abdullahi 12'32"; Esmaeili 22'41"; Hassani 36'09"	Report

Dakar Arena
Referee: Feliciano Farina (PAR), Servando Berna (USA)

=== Group B ===
Pos	Team	Pld	W	W+	WP	L	GF	GA	GD	Pts	Qualification
1	Portugal	3	3	0	0	0	17	2	+15	9	Semifinals
2	Morocco	3	2	0	0	1	22	8	+14	6	Semifinals
3	Paraguay	3	1	0	0	2	12	10	+2	3	
4	Solomon Islands	3	0	0	0	3	4	35	−31	0	

Source: Dakar 2026
2 November 2026
10:00

Solomon Islands	2–9	Paraguay
Suimae 25'03", 36'36"	Report	Sandoval 0'14"; Boderone 17'21"; J. Cáceres 19'12", 27'48"; Rambo 23'08", 32'55" (pen.); Barreto 30'50"; O. Cáceres 38'23"; Mora 39'19"

CID Arena
Referee: Servando Berna (USA), Laurențiu Ilie (ROU)
2 November 2026
12:00

Portugal	4–1	Morocco
Monteiro 18'24", 29'47"; Ferreira 34'49", 37'26"	Report	Haddou Ouali 36'47"

CID Arena
Referee: Federico Piccardo (URU), Yahya Al-Athwani (KSA)

4 November 2026
10:00

Portugal	11–1	Solomon Islands
Duarte 3'05"; Salvado 8'00", 25'00"; Capristano 10'49", 26'02", 28'58"; Gaspar 15'01", 18'28", 31'02", 31'27"; Monteiro 22'43"	Report	Daomae 36'47"

CID Arena
Referee: Nour Chaito (LBN), Ali Al-Ayat (LBA)
4 November 2026
12:00

Paraguay	3–6	Morocco
O. Cáceres 4'51"; Boderone 19'39", 24'46"	Report	Aït Challa 7'05", 24'29", 25'35"; Sarghine 29'26", 36'46"; Houdane 33'47" (pen.)

CID Arena
Referee: Takeshi Fujita (JPN), Jernej Petek (SLO)

7 November 2026
10:00

Paraguay	0–2	Portugal
	Report	Capistrano 8'47", 19'53"

Dakar Arena
Referee: Ali Al-Ayat (LBA), Arnaud Llambrich (FRA)
7 November 2026
12:00

Morocco	15–1	Solomon Islands
El Ahmadi 2'47", 18"07", 20'27", 21'19", 22'24"; Serrar 4'25"; Sarghine 8'27"; Aït Challa 12'39", 26'26", 35'40"; Houdane 26'58", 28'35"; El Bahi 28'00", 34'56", 39'46"	Report	Billy 25'14"

Dakar Arena
Referee: Turekhan Tursumbayev (KAZ), Juliana Angelo (BRA)

== Knockout stage ==
=== Bracket ===
Semifinals
9 November – Dakar Arena
Portugal	2
Afghanistan	0
9 November – Dakar Arena
Argentina	4
Morocco	2

Gold medal match
12 November – Dakar Arena
Portugal	1
Argentina	2
Bronze medal match
12 November – Dakar Arena
Afghanistan	1
Morocco	2

=== Semifinals ===
9 November 2026
11:00

Portugal	2–0	Afghanistan
Carvalho 7'25"; Ferreira 19'15"	Report

Dakar Arena
Referee: Federico Piccardo (URU), Feliciano Farina (PAR)
9 November 2026
15:30

Argentina	4–2	Morocco
Barrios 9'32" (pen.); López 16'24"; Henriques 35'15"; Velásquez 39'41" (pen.)	Report	Aït Challa 26'12"; Houdane 29'47"

Dakar Arena
Referee: Jernej Petek (SLO), Turekhan Tursumbayev (KAZ)

=== Bronze medal match ===
12 November 2026
11:00

Afghanistan	1–2	Morocco
	Report

Dakar Arena

=== Gold medal match ===
12 November 2026
15:00

Argentina	2–1	Portugal
	Report

Dakar Arena

== Overall ranking ==
Pos	Team	Pld	W	W+	WP	L	GF	GA	GD	Pts
1	Argentina	5	5	0	0	0	26	7	+19	15
2	Portugal	5	4	0	0	1	20	4	+16	12
3	Morocco	5	3	0	0	2	26	13	+13	9
4	Afghanistan	5	2	0	0	3	13	6	+7	6
5	Paraguay	3	1	0	0	2	12	10	+2	3
6	Senegal (H)	3	1	0	0	2	7	19	−12	3
7	Panama	3	0	0	0	3	5	19	−14	0
8	Solomon Islands	3	0	0	0	3	4	35	−31	0

Source: Dakar 2026
Rules for classification: (5th to 8th place) 1) points; 2) goal difference; 3) goals scored; 4) equal ranking if still tied (regulations Article 15.6).
(H) Host

== Goalscorers ==
There were 0 goals scored in 0 matches, for an average of -nan goals per match.
