= Niger at the 2026 Summer Youth Olympics =

- Flag of Niger
- IOC code: NIG
- NOC: Nigerien Olympic and National Sports Committee

in Dakar, Senegal October 31, 2026 – November 13, 2026
- Competitors: 6 in 5 sports
- Flag bearers: Aminatou Boubacarousmane & Issifi Abdoul Aziz
- Medals: Gold 0 Silver 0 Bronze 0 Total 0

Summer Youth Olympics appearances
- 2010; 2014; 2018; 2026

Niger competed at the 2026 Summer Youth Olympics in Dakar, Senegal from October 31 to November 13, 2026. This marked Niger's fourth appearance at the Youth Olympics, after making its debut in 2010.

Judoka Aminatou Boubacarousmane and taekwondo practitioner Issifi Abdoul Aziz served as the flag bearers for the opening ceremony.

== Competitors ==
The following is the list of number of competitors participating at the Games per sport/discipline.

| Sport | Men | Women | Total |
|---|---|---|---|
| Athletics | 0 | 1 | 1 |
| Judo | 0 | 1 | 1 |
| Swimming | 1 | 0 | 1 |
| Taekwondo | 1 | 1 | 2 |
| Wushu | 1 | 0 | 1 |
| Total | 3 | 3 | 6 |

== Athletics ==
Niger entered one female athlete.

=== Track & road events ===
Women

| Athlete | Event | Semifinal | | Final | |
| Athlete | Event | Result | Rank | Result | Rank |
|---|---|---|---|---|---|
| Nana Zakari | 1500 m | | | | |

== Judo ==
Niger entered one female judoka based on the available quotas assigned by the International Judo Federation.

Women

| Athlete | Event | Round of 16 | Quarterfinals | Semifinals | Repechage 1 | Repechage 2 | Final | |
| Athlete | Event | Opposition Result | Opposition Result | Opposition Result | Opposition Result | Opposition Result | Opposition Result | Rank |
|---|---|---|---|---|---|---|---|---|
| Aminatou Boubacarousmane | –52 kg | | | | | | | |

== Swimming ==
Niger entered one male swimmer.

| Athlete | Event | Heat | | Final | |
| Athlete | Event | Time | Rank | Time | Rank |
|---|---|---|---|---|---|
| Marouane Mamane | 50 m freestyle | | | | |
| Marouane Mamane | 50 m butterfly | | | | |

== Taekwondo ==
Niger entered two athletes, one of each gender.

| Athlete | Event | Round of 16 | Quarterfinals | Semifinals | Repechage | Final / BM | |
| Athlete | Event | Opposition Result | Opposition Result | Opposition Result | Opposition Result | Opposition Result | Rank |
|---|---|---|---|---|---|---|---|
| Issifi Abdoul Aziz | Men's -55 kg | | | | | | |
| Housseina Mamoudou | Women's -49 kg | | | | | | |

== Wushu ==
Niger entered one male athlete after quotas were assigned by the International Wushu Federation.

| Athlete | Event | Changquan routine | | Gunshu routine | | Total Points | Final Rank |
| Athlete | Event | Points | Rank | Points | Rank | Total Points | Final Rank |
|---|---|---|---|---|---|---|---|
| Mahamadou Eggoh | Men's changquan combined | | | | | | |
