= Athletics at the 2026 Summer Youth Olympics – Women's 400 metres =

Athletics event at the 2026 Summer Youth Olympics

Women's 400 metres at the IV Summer Youth Olympic Games
- Venue: Complexe Iba Mar Diop
- Date: 8 November
- Competitors: 15 from 15 nations

Medalists
1st place, gold medalist(s)		Praise Ugoh	Nigeria
2nd place, silver medalist(s)		Osmary Pacheco	Venezuela
3rd place, bronze medalist(s)		Aisha Muhammed	United Arab Emirates

The women's 400 metres event at the 2026 Summer Youth Olympics was held on 8 November at the Complexe Iba Mar Diop in Dakar, Senegal. The competition consisted of two semi-final heats, with nine athletes qualifying for the final.

== Schedule ==
All times are local (West Africa Time, UTC+0).

Date	Time	Round
8 November 2026	16:20	Semi-finals
9 November 2026	16:50	Finals

== Results ==
=== Semi-finals ===
The semi-finals consisted of two heats. The first four athletes in each heat (Q) qualified automatically for the final. One additional athlete with the fastest time among the remaining competitors (q) also advanced to the final. A total of nine athletes qualified for the final.

The abbreviation Q denotes qualification by finishing position, while q denotes qualification by time. Athletes who did not meet either qualification criterion were eliminated.

Rank	Semi-final	Bib	Athlete	Nation	Result	Notes
1	SF1	292	Osmary Pacheco	Venezuela	53.01	Q, PB
2	SF1	230	Praise Ugoh	Nigeria	54.38	Q, PB
3	SF2	280	Aisha Muhammed	United Arab Emirates	54.89	Q
4	SF1	255	Neli Kramarsek	Slovenia	55.31	Q
5	SF2	104	Noa Godoy	Andorra	55.87	Q, PB
6	SF2	157	Monica Galiano	Spain	56.42	Q
7	SF2	272	Yi-Cen Chen	Chinese Taipei	57.18	Q
8	SF1	268	Phichayapha Sukaue	Thailand	57.24	Q, PB
9	SF2	248	Sonia Eli-Elohe Abizera	Rwanda	57.29	q, PB
10	SF1	164	Kurigni Desta	Ethiopia	57.45	PB
11	SF1	250	Magette Gaye Ndiaye	Senegal	57.99	L, PB
12	SF2	293	Thi Huong Dong	Vietnam	58.40	PB
13	SF1	210	Simona Slapsinskaite	Lithuania	58.63	
14	SF2	133	Djanaba Issa	Cameroon	1:01.36	
15	SF2	124	Lucienne Djiallate	Chad	1:01.70	PB

=== Final ===
The final was held on 9 November 2026 at 16:50 local time. Praise Ugoh of Nigeria won the gold medal in a personal best of 52.76 seconds.

Rank	Lane	Bib	Athlete	Nation	Result	Reaction time	Remark
1st place, gold medalist(s)	6	230	Praise Ugoh	Nigeria	52.76	0.170	PB
2nd place, silver medalist(s)	7	292	Osmary Pacheco	Venezuela	52.85	0.170	PB
3rd place, bronze medalist(s)	5	280	Aisha Muhammed	United Arab Emirates	53.06	0.178	PB
4	8	255	Neli Kramarsek	Slovenia	54.99	0.181	
5	4	104	Noa Godoy	Andorra	55.51	0.164	PB
6	2	272	Yi-Cen Chen	Chinese Taipei	56.37	0.150	
7	3	248	Sonia Eli-Elohe Abizera	Rwanda	56.85	0.154	PB
8	9	268	Phichayapha Sukaue	Thailand	56.99	0.166	PB
9	1	157	Monica Galiano	Spain	57.04	0.173	
