= Beach wrestling at the 2026 Summer Youth Olympics – Men's 70 kg =

Wrestling event at the 2026 Summer Youth Olympics

Men's 70 kg at the 2026 Summer Youth Olympics
- Venue: Saly Beach West
- Date: 8 November 2026
- Competitors: 12 from 12 nations

Medalists
gold medal	Tunar Guliyev	Azerbaijan
silver medal	Luka Makharadze	Georgia
bronze medal	Mykyta Kuzmenko	Ukraine

The men's 70 kg competition in beach wrestling at the 2026 Summer Youth Olympics was held on 8 November 2026 at Saly Beach West in Saly, Senegal.

== Competition format ==
The 12 wrestlers were divided into three groups of four. Wrestlers competed in a round-robin format within their groups. The winner of each group and the best second-placed wrestler advanced to the semifinals. The semifinal winners competed for the gold medal, while the semifinal losers competed for the bronze medal.

== Schedule ==
All times are local (UTC−3).

Date	Event
8 November 2026	Group stage, semifinals and medal matches

== Results ==
=== Legend ===
- Q – Qualified for semifinals as group winner
- q – Qualified for semifinals as best second-placed wrestler

=== Results codes ===
Code	Meaning
VFA	Victory by a 3-point takedown or throw, without any point scored by the opponent
VFA1	Victory by a 3-point takedown or throw, with point(s) scored by the opponent
VSU	Victory with 3 points but without a 3-point takedown or throw, without any point scored by the opponent
VSU1	Victory with 3 points but without a 3-point takedown or throw, with point(s) scored by the opponent
VPO	Victory with less than 3 points

=== Group stage ===
==== Group A ====
Match	Wrestler	NOC	Technical points	Classification points	Result
89	Joab Jabriel Carrillo Rodriguez	Puerto Rico	3	2	VSU
89	Diasivi Renato	Angola	0	0	VSU
90	Wairangi Sargent	New Zealand	0	0	VSU
90	Tunar Guliyev	Azerbaijan	3	2	VSU
101	Joab Jabriel Carrillo Rodriguez	Puerto Rico	3	2	VSU1
101	Wairangi Sargent	New Zealand	1	1	VSU1
102	Diasivi Renato	Angola	0	0	VSU
102	Tunar Guliyev	Azerbaijan	3	2	VSU
137	Joab Jabriel Carrillo Rodriguez	Puerto Rico	1	1	VSU1
137	Tunar Guliyev	Azerbaijan	3	2	VSU1
138	Diasivi Renato	Angola	5	4	VFA1
138	Wairangi Sargent	New Zealand	1	1	VFA1

Rank	Wrestler	NOC	Matches won	Classification points	Technical points scored	Technical points conceded	Draw number	Qualification
1	Tunar Guliyev	Azerbaijan	3	6	9	1	233	Q
2	Joab Jabriel Carrillo Rodriguez	Puerto Rico	2	5	7	4	12	
3	Diasivi Renato	Angola	1	4	5	7	92	
4	Wairangi Sargent	New Zealand	0	2	2	11	114	

==== Group B ====
Match	Wrestler	NOC	Technical points	Classification points	Result
91	Calvin Omweri	Kenya	0	0	VSU
91	Mykyta Kuzmenko	Ukraine	3	2	VSU
92	Luka Makharadze	Georgia	3	2	VSU
92	Mark Zemen	Hungary	0	0	VSU
103	Calvin Omweri	Kenya	0	0	VFA
103	Luka Makharadze	Georgia	5	4	VFA
104	Mykyta Kuzmenko	Ukraine	3	2	VSU
104	Mark Zemen	Hungary	0	0	VSU
139	Calvin Omweri	Kenya	3	2	VSU
139	Mark Zemen	Hungary	0	0	VSU
140	Mykyta Kuzmenko	Ukraine	1	1	VSU1
140	Luka Makharadze	Georgia	3	2	VSU1

Rank	Wrestler	NOC	Matches won	Classification points	Technical points scored	Technical points conceded	Draw number	Qualification
1	Luka Makharadze	Georgia	3	8	11	1	115	Q
2	Mykyta Kuzmenko	Ukraine	2	5	7	3	81	q
3	Calvin Omweri	Kenya	1	2	3	8	51	
4	Mark Zemen	Hungary	0	0	0	9	214	

==== Group C ====
Match	Wrestler	NOC	Technical points	Classification points	Result
93	Mohamed Ahmed Hafez	Egypt	1	1	VSU1
93	Ibrahima Sarr	Senegal	3	2	VSU1
94	Anuj	India	0	0	VSU
94	Kiarash Torabi	Iran	3	2	VSU
105	Mohamed Ahmed Hafez	Egypt	3	2	VSU1
105	Anuj	India	2	1	VSU1
106	Ibrahima Sarr	Senegal	1	0	VPO
106	Kiarash Torabi	Iran	2	1	VPO
141	Mohamed Ahmed Hafez	Egypt	0	0	VSU
141	Kiarash Torabi	Iran	3	2	VSU
142	Ibrahima Sarr	Senegal	1	0	VPO
142	Anuj	India	2	1	VPO

Rank	Wrestler	NOC	Matches won	Classification points	Technical points scored	Technical points conceded	Draw number	Qualification
1	Kiarash Torabi	Iran	3	5	8	1	151	Q
2	Mohamed Ahmed Hafez	Egypt	1	3	4	8	69	
3	Ibrahima Sarr	Senegal	1	2	5	5	73	
4	Anuj	India	1	2	4	7	137	

=== Finals ===
==== Semifinals ====
Match	Wrestler	NOC	Classification points	Technical points	Result
149	Tunar Guliyev	Azerbaijan	1	2	VPO
149	Mykyta Kuzmenko	Ukraine	0	0	VPO
154	Luka Makharadze	Georgia	2	3	VSU
154	Kiarash Torabi	Iran	0	0	VSU

==== Medal matches ====
Match	Wrestler	NOC	Classification points	Technical points	Result
Gold Medal	Tunar Guliyev	Azerbaijan	2	3	VSU1
Gold Medal	Luka Makharadze	Georgia	1	1	VSU1
Silver Medal	Mykyta Kuzmenko	Ukraine	2	4	VSU1
Silver Medal	Kiarash Torabi	Iran	1	2	VSU1

=== Final classification ===
Rank	Wrestler	NOC
1st place, gold medalist(s)	Tunar Guliyev	Azerbaijan
2nd place, silver medalist(s)	Luka Makharadze	Georgia
3rd place, bronze medalist(s)	Mykyta Kuzmenko	Ukraine
4	Kiarash Torabi	Iran
5	Joab Jabriel Carrillo Rodriguez	Puerto Rico
6	Diasivi Renato	Angola
7	Mohamed Ahmed Hafez	Egypt
8	Ibrahima Sarr	Senegal
9	Calvin Omweri	Kenya
10	Anuj	India
11	Wairangi Sargent	New Zealand
12	Mark Zemen	Hungary
