= Madagascar at the 2026 Summer Youth Olympics =

- Flag of Madagascar
- IOC code: MAD
- NOC: Comité Olympique Malgache

in Dakar, Senegal October 31, 2026 – November 13, 2026
- Competitors: 18 in 6 sports
- Flag bearers: Oceane Rakotonanahary & Tokiniana Minoharintsoa
- Medals: Gold 0 Silver 0 Bronze 0 Total 0

Summer Youth Olympics appearances
- 2010; 2014; 2018; 2026

Madagascar is scheduled to compete at the 2026 Summer Youth Olympics in Dakar, Senegal from October 31 to November 13, 2026. This will mark Madagascar's fourth appearance at the Youth Olympics, after making its debut in 2010.

Swimmer Oceane Rakotonanahary and judoka Tokiniana Minoharintsoa served as the flag bearers for the opening ceremony.

== Competitors ==
The following is the list of number of competitors participating at the Games per sport/discipline.

Sport	Men	Women	Total
Athletics	0	1	1
Beach wrestling	0	1	1
Judo	1	0	1
Rugby sevens	0	12	12
Swimming	1	1	2
Table tennis	0	1	1
Total	2	16	18

== Athletics ==
Madagascar entered one female athlete.

=== Track & road events ===
Women

Athlete	Event	Semifinal		Final	
Athlete	Event	Result	Rank	Result	Rank
Laura Jauslin	200 m				

== Beach wrestling ==
Madagascar entered one female athlete.

Women

Team	Event	Group stage				Semifinals	Final / BM	
Team	Event	Opposition Result	Opposition Result	Opposition Result	Rank	Opposition Result	Opposition Result	Rank
Nomenjanahary Randriatiana	–45 kg							

== Judo ==
Madagascar entered one male judoka based on the available quotas assigned by the International Judo Federation.

Men

Athlete	Event	Round of 16	Quarterfinals	Semifinals	Repechage 1	Repechage 2	Final	
Athlete	Event	Opposition Result	Opposition Result	Opposition Result	Opposition Result	Opposition Result	Opposition Result	Rank
Tokiniaina Minoharintsoa	–100 kg	Bye						

== Rugby sevens ==
Madagascar entered a team for the women's tournament.

Summary

Event	Group stage				Semifinal	Final / BM	
Event	Opposition Score	Opposition Score	Opposition Score	Group Rank	Opposition Score	Opposition Score	Rank
Women's tournament							

Roster

- Miora Andrianasolo
- Tracy Etiavananomenjanahary
- Soa Landy
- Fiaro Nantenaina
- Finoana Rabearinoro
- Jenny Rabebiarinoro
- Zo Rakotonindrina
- Princia Ranaivoson
- Soloniaina Rasoamanarivo
- Fitia Rasoanatoandro
- Sariaka Raveloarisoa
- Melissah Razafindravelo

== Swimming ==
Madagascar entered two swimmers, one male and one female.

Athlete	Event	Heat		Final	
Athlete	Event	Time	Rank	Time	Rank
Tendry Rakotobe	50 m backstroke				
Tendry Rakotobe	50 m butterfly				
Tendry Rakotobe	100 m butterfly				
Oceane Rakotonanahary	100 m freestyle				
Oceane Rakotonanahary	50 m breaststroke				
Oceane Rakotonanahary	100 m breaststroke				

== Table tennis ==
Madagascar entered one female athlete.

Athlete	Event	Group stage				Round of 32	Round of 16	Quarterfinal	Semifinal	Final	
Athlete	Event	Opposition Result	Opposition Result	Opposition Result	Rank	Opposition Result	Opposition Result	Opposition Result	Opposition Result	Opposition Result	Rank
Tina Andriantahina	Women's singles										
