= Praise Ugoh =

Nigerian track and field athlete

Praise Tejiri Ugoh
Personal information
- Nationality: Nigeria
- Born: 5 April 2010 (age 16)

Sport
- Sport: Athletics
- Events: 100 metres, 200 metres, 400 metres

Achievements and titles
- Personal bests: 100 m: 11.39 (2026); 200 m: 23.28 (2026); 400 m: 52.76 (2026)
Medal record
Women's athletics
Representing Nigeria
Youth Olympic Games
Gold medal – first place	2026 Dakar	400 m

OgheneTejiri Praise Ugoh (born 5 April 2010) is a Nigerian track and field athlete, specializing in sprint. In 2026, she won gold in the 400 meters at the Summer Youth Olympic Games, setting a new personal best.

== Career ==
Born in Delta State, Ugoh made her international debut for Nigeria at the 2026 World Athletics U20 Championships in Eugene, Oregon, where she competed in the 4 × 100 m relay. She also helped lead Nigeria's 4 × 400 m relay team to the final.

At the Summer Youth Olympic Games, she became the first Nigerian to win gold in the 400 metres, recording a new personal best of 52.76 seconds.
