= Luxembourg at the 2026 Summer Youth Olympics =

- IOC code: LUX
- NOC: Luxembourgish Olympic and Sporting Committee
- Website: http://teamletzebuerg.lu/

in Dakar, Senegal 31 October – 13 November 2026
- Competitors: 3 in 3 sports
- Medals: Gold 0 Silver 1 Bronze 0 Total 1

Summer Youth Olympics appearances
- 2010; 2014; 2018; 2026

Luxembourg is scheduled to compete at the 2026 Summer Youth Olympics in Dakar, Senegal, from 31 October to 13 November 2026. This will be the nation's fourth appearance at the Summer Youth Olympic Games.

== Cycling ==
Luxembourg qualified one female cyclist to compete in the road events based on national junior rankings.

Track & road events

Athlete	Event	Time Trial		Road Race		Final placing	
Athlete	Event	Result	Rank	Result	Rank	Result	Rank
June Nothum	Women's individual time trial			—N/a			
June Nothum	Women's road race	—N/a					

== Table Tennis ==
Luxembourg qualified one male athlete for the singles competition through the ITTF global field allocation process.

Singles

Athlete	Event	Round of 32	Round of 16	Quarterfinals	Semifinals	Final / BM	
Athlete	Event	Opposition Score	Opposition Score	Opposition Score	Opposition Score	Opposition Score	Rank
Aaron Sahr	Men's singles						

== Triathlon ==
Luxembourg qualified one male triathlete following the confirmation of quota allocations by World Triathlon and the IOC.

Individual

Athlete	Event	Swim (750m)	Trans 1	Bike (20 km)	Trans 2	Run (5 km)	Total Time	Rank
Emile Vanolst	Men's							
