= 3x3 basketball at the 2026 Summer Youth Olympics – Women's tournament =

Tournament details
- Host country: Senegal
- City: Dakar
- Dates: 6–9 November
- Teams: 12

Final positions
- Champions: Poland (1st title)
- Runners-up: China
- Third place: Senegal
- Fourth place: Egypt

The women's tournament in 3x3 basketball at the 2026 Summer Youth Olympics was held from 6 to 9 November 2026 at the Complexe Tour de l'Oeuf in Dakar, Senegal.

== Participating teams ==
Group A

- China
- Kenya
- Fiji

Group B

- Chile
- Mexico
- Chinese Taipei

Group C

- Czech Republic
- Ukraine
- Egypt

Group D

- France
- Poland
- Senegal

== Preliminary round ==
All times are local (UTC+0).

=== Pool A ===
Pos	Team	Pld	W	L	PF	PA	PD	Qualification
1	China	2	2	0	41	19	+22	Quarterfinals
2	Kenya	2	1	1	27	29	−2	Quarterfinals
3	Fiji	2	0	2	13	33	−20	

Source: IOC
Rules for classification: 1) Wins; 2) Head-to-head record; 3) Points scored.

6 November 2026
10:00

Report

China	21–4	Fiji
Pts: Sun H. 8		Pts: Suka 3

Complexe Tour de l'Oeuf, Dakar
Referees: Hannah Dale (NZL), Ana Vamos (ROU)

6 November 2026
11:50

Report

Kenya	12–9	Fiji
Pts: Ochieng 6		Pts: Maiwiriwiri 4

Complexe Tour de l'Oeuf, Dakar

6 November 2026
16:00

Report

China	20–15	Kenya

Complexe Tour de l'Oeuf, Dakar

=== Pool B ===
Pos	Team	Pld	W	L	PF	PA	PD	Qualification
1	Chinese Taipei	2	2	0	41	31	+10	Quarterfinals
2	Chile	2	1	1	33	29	+4	Quarterfinals
3	Mexico	2	0	2	23	37	−14	

Source: IOC
Rules for classification: 1) Wins; 2) Head-to-head record; 3) Points scored.

7 November 2026
10:50

Report

Chile	17–20	Chinese Taipei

Complexe Tour de l'Oeuf, Dakar

7 November 2026
15:00

Report

Mexico	14–21	Chinese Taipei

Complexe Tour de l'Oeuf, Dakar

7 November 2026
16:50

Report

Chile	16–9	Mexico

Complexe Tour de l'Oeuf, Dakar

=== Pool C ===
Pos	Team	Pld	W	L	PF	PA	PD	Qualification
1	Egypt	2	2	0	23	18	+5	Quarterfinals
2	Czech Republic	2	1	1	20	22	−2	Quarterfinals
3	Ukraine	2	0	2	20	23	−3	

Source: IOC
Rules for classification: 1) Wins; 2) Head-to-head record; 3) Points scored.

6 November 2026
10:25

Report

Czech Republic	8–12	Egypt
Pts: Pavlíková 3		Pts: Hassabelnaby 6

Complexe Tour de l'Oeuf, Dakar
Referees: Monicca Nassuuna (UGA), Nie Cong (CHN)

6 November 2026
12:15

Report

Ukraine	10–11	Egypt
Pts: Markiv 5		Pts: 3 players 3

Complexe Tour de l'Oeuf, Dakar

6 November 2026
16:25

Report

Czech Republic	12–10	Ukraine

Complexe Tour de l'Oeuf, Dakar

=== Pool D ===
Pos	Team	Pld	W	L	PF	PA	PD	Qualification
1	Senegal (H)	2	2	0	38	31	+7	Quarterfinals
2	Poland	2	1	1	36	35	+1	Quarterfinals
3	France	2	0	2	27	35	−8	

Source: IOC
Rules for classification: 1) Wins; 2) Head-to-head record; 3) Points scored.
(H) Hosts

7 November 2026
11:15

Report

France	12–18	Senegal

Complexe Tour de l'Oeuf, Dakar

7 November 2026
15:25

Report

France	15–17	Poland

Complexe Tour de l'Oeuf, Dakar

7 November 2026
17:15

Report

Poland	19–20	Senegal

Complexe Tour de l'Oeuf, Dakar

== Knockout round ==
=== Bracket ===
Quarterfinals
A1	China	21
C2	Czech Republic	14
D1	Senegal	13
B2	Chile	11
B1	Chinese Taipei	10
D2	Poland	20
C1	Egypt	14
A2	Kenya	13

Semifinals
A1	China	21
D1	Senegal	19
D2	Poland	19
C1	Egypt	14

Finals
A1	China	11
D2	Poland	12
Third place
D1	Senegal	18
C1	Egypt	17

=== Quarterfinals ===
8 November 2026
11:30

Report

China	21–14	Czech Republic

Complexe Tour de l'Oeuf, Dakar

8 November 2026
11:55

Report

Senegal	13–11	Chile

Complexe Tour de l'Oeuf, Dakar

8 November 2026
15:00

Report

Chinese Taipei	10–20	Poland

Complexe Tour de l'Oeuf, Dakar

8 November 2026
15:25

Report

Egypt	14–13	Kenya

Complexe Tour de l'Oeuf, Dakar

=== Semifinals ===
9 November 2026
11:30

Report

China	21–19	Senegal

Complexe Tour de l'Oeuf, Dakar

9 November 2026
11:55

Report

Poland	19–14	Egypt

Complexe Tour de l'Oeuf, Dakar

=== Third place game ===
9 November 2026
15:00

Report

Senegal	18–17	Egypt

Complexe Tour de l'Oeuf, Dakar

=== Final ===
9 November 2026
15:50

Report

China	11–12	Poland

Complexe Tour de l'Oeuf, Dakar

== Final standings ==
Rank	Team
1st place, gold medalist(s)	Poland
2nd place, silver medalist(s)	China
3rd place, bronze medalist(s)	Senegal
4	Egypt
5	Chinese Taipei
6	Chile
7	Kenya
8	Czech Republic
9	France
10	Mexico
11	Ukraine
12	Fiji

== See also ==
- 3x3 basketball at the 2026 Summer Youth Olympics – Men's tournament
