= Beach handball at the 2026 Summer Youth Olympics – Women's tournament =

2026 Summer Youth Olympics
Tournament details
- Host country: Senegal
- Venue: Saly
- Dates: 9–13 November
- Teams: 8 (from 5 confederations)

The women's beach handball tournament at the 2027 Summer Youth Olympics was held from 9 to 13 November 2018 at the Saly Beach.

== Preliminary round ==
All times are local (UTC+0).

=== Group A ===
Pos	Team	Pld	W	L	Pts	SW	SL	SR	SPW	SPL	SPR	Qualification
1	Spain	0	0	0	0	0	0	—	0	0	—	Quarterfinals
2	Croatia	0	0	0	0	0	0	—	0	0	—	Quarterfinals
3	China	0	0	0	0	0	0	—	0	0	—	Quarterfinals
4	Mexico	0	0	0	0	0	0	—	0	0	—	Quarterfinals

Updated to match(es) played on unknown. Source:
Rules for classification: 1) Points; 2) Head-to-head points; 3) Head-to-head set difference; 4) Head-to-head points won; 5) Set difference; 6) Points won; 7) Draw.

9 November 2026; 9:30	Spain	v	China	Centre Court

9 November 2026; 9:30	Croatia	v	Mexico	Court 2

9 November 2026; 15:00	Mexico	v	Spain	Centre Court

9 November 2026; 15:00	China	v	Croatia	Court 2

10 November 2026; 10:50	Spain	v	Croatia	Centre Court

10 November 2026; 10:50	China	v	Mexico	Court 2

=== Group B ===
Pos	Team	Pld	W	L	Pts	SW	SL	SR	SPW	SPL	SPR	Qualification
1	Uruguay	0	0	0	0	0	0	—	0	0	—	Quarterfinals
2	France	0	0	0	0	0	0	—	0	0	—	Quarterfinals
3	Kenya	0	0	0	0	0	0	—	0	0	—	Quarterfinals
4	Senegal (H)	0	0	0	0	0	0	—	0	0	—	Quarterfinals

Updated to match(es) played on unknown. Source:
Rules for classification: 1) Points; 2) Head-to-head points; 3) Head-to-head set difference; 4) Head-to-head points won; 5) Set difference; 6) Points won; 7) Draw.
(H) Host

9 November 2026; 11:10	France	v	Senegal	Centre Court

9 November 2026; 11:10	Uruguay	v	Kenya	Court 2

9 November 2026; 15:50	Kenya	v	France	Court 2

9 November 2026; 15:50	Senegal	v	Uruguay	Court 3

10 November 2026; 12:30	Uruguay	v	France	Centre Court

10 November 2026; 12:30	Kenya	v	Senegal	Court 2

== Knockout stage ==
=== Bracket ===
Gold medal bracket

Quarter-finals
11 November
11 November
11 November
11 November

Semi-finals
12 November
12 November

Final
13 November
Third place
13 November

Fifth place bracket

5–8th place semifinals
11 November
11 November

Fifth place game
12 November
Seventh place game
12 November

=== Quarterfinals ===
11 November 2026; 10:00	v	Centre Court

11 November 2026; 10:00	v	Court 2

11 November 2026; 10:00	v	Court 3

11 November 2026; 10:50	v	Court 3

=== 5–8th place semifinals ===
11 November 2026; 15:30	v	Centre Court

11 November 2026; 15:30	v	Court 2

=== Semifinals ===
12 November 2026; 10:00	v	Centre Court

12 November 2026; 10:50	v	Centre Court

=== Seventh place game ===
12 November 2026; 15:30	v	Court 2

=== Fifth place game ===
12 November 2026; 15:30	v	Centre Court

=== Third place game ===
13 November 2026; 9:30	v	Centre Court

=== Gold medal game ===
13 November 2026; 11:30	v	Centre Court

== Final ranking ==
Rank	Team
1st place, gold medalist(s)	
2nd place, silver medalist(s)	
3rd place, bronze medalist(s)	
4	
5	
6	
7	
8	
