= Rwanda at the 2026 Summer Youth Olympics =

- Flag of Rwanda
- IOC code: RWA
- NOC: Comité National Olympique et Sportif du Rwanda

in Dakar, Senegal October 31, 2026 – November 13, 2026
- Competitors: 9 in 5 sports
- Flag bearers: Donatha Akimana & Kean Murenzi
- Medals: Gold 0 Silver 0 Bronze 0 Total 0

Summer Youth Olympics appearances
- 2010; 2014; 2018; 2026

Rwanda competed at the 2026 Summer Youth Olympics in Dakar, Senegal from October 31 to November 13, 2026. This marked Rwanda's fourth appearance at the Youth Olympics, after making its debut in 2010.

Cyclist Donatha Akimana and swimmer Kean Murenzi served as the flag bearers for the opening ceremony.

== Competitors ==
The following is the list of number of competitors participating at the Games per sport/discipline.

| Sport | Men | Women | Total |
|---|---|---|---|
| Athletics | 0 | 1 | 1 |
| Road cycling | 1 | 1 | 2 |
| Swimming | 2 | 2 | 4 |
| Taekwondo | 1 | 0 | 1 |
| Wushu | 1 | 0 | 1 |
| Total | 5 | 4 | 9 |

== Athletics ==
Rwanda entered one female athlete.

=== Track & road events ===
Women

| Athlete | Event | Semifinal | | Final | |
| Athlete | Event | Result | Rank | Result | Rank |
|---|---|---|---|---|---|
| Sonia Abizera | 400 m | | | | |

== Road cycling ==
Rwanda entered two athletes, one of each gender.

Men

| Athlete | Event | Time | Rank |
|---|---|---|---|
| Emmanuel Shema | Road race | | |
| Emmanuel Shema | Time trial | | |

Women

| Athlete | Event | Time | Rank |
|---|---|---|---|
| Donatha Akimana | Road race | | |
| Donatha Akimana | Time trial | | |

== Swimming ==
Rwanda entered four swimmers, two of each gender.

Men

| Athlete | Event | Heat | | Final | |
| Athlete | Event | Time | Rank | Time | Rank |
|---|---|---|---|---|---|
| Ntwali Jayden | 50 m freestyle | | | | |
| Ntwali Jayden | 50 m backstroke | | | | |
| Ntwali Jayden | 50 m butterfly | | | | |
| Sheja Murenzi | 100 m freestyle | | | | |
| Sheja Murenzi | 200 m freestyle | | | | |
| Sheja Murenzi | 100 m butterfly | | | | |

Women

| Athlete | Event | Heat | | Final | |
| Athlete | Event | Time | Rank | Time | Rank |
|---|---|---|---|---|---|
| Kalisa Kewa | 200 m backstroke | | | | |
| Kalisa Kewa | 50 m breaststroke | | | | |
| Kalisa Kewa | 50 m butterfly | | | | |
| Aragsan Mugabo | 50 m freestyle | | | | |
| Aragsan Mugabo | 100 m freestyle | | | | |
| Aragsan Mugabo | 50 m backstroke | | | | |

== Taekwondo ==
Rwanda entered one female athlete.

Women

| Athlete | Event | Round of 16 | Quarterfinals | Semifinals | Repechage | Final / BM | |
| Athlete | Event | Opposition Result | Opposition Result | Opposition Result | Opposition Result | Opposition Result | Rank |
|---|---|---|---|---|---|---|---|
| Francoise Uwamahoro | -49 kg | | | | | | |

== Wushu ==
Rwanda entered one male athlete after quotas were assigned by the International Wushu Federation.

| Athlete | Event | Changquan routine | | Gunshu routine | | Total Points | Final Rank |
| Athlete | Event | Points | Rank | Points | Rank | Total Points | Final Rank |
|---|---|---|---|---|---|---|---|
| Fracois Mugisha | Men's changquan combined | | | | | | |
