= Futsal at the 2026 Summer Youth Olympics – Women's tournament =

2026 Summer Youth Olympics women's futsal tournament
Tournament details
- Host country: Senegal
- Dates: 1–11 November 2026
- Teams: 8 (from 6 confederations)
- Venues: 2 (in 2 host cities)

Final positions
- Champions: Ukraine (1st title)
- Runners-up: Venezuela
- Third place: Iran
- Fourth place: Italy

Tournament statistics
- Matches played: 16
- Goals scored: 96 (6 per match)
- Top scorer(s): (Ukraine) Marharyta Ruchka (6 goals)

The women's futsal tournament at the 2026 Summer Youth Olympics took place in Dakar and Diamniadio, Senegal between 1–11 November 2026.

== Group stage ==
=== Group A ===
Pos	Team	Pld	W	W+	WP	L	GF	GA	GD	Pts	Qualification
1	Ukraine	3	2	1	0	0	17	7	+10	8	Semifinals
2	Venezuela	3	2	0	0	1	11	5	+6	6	Semifinals
3	Senegal (H)	3	1	0	0	2	10	9	+1	3	
4	Fiji	3	0	0	0	3	2	19	−17	0	

Source: Dakar 2026
(H) Host
1 November 2026
15:30

Venezuela	4–5 (a.e.t.)	Ukraine
Velásquez 11'57"; Rodríguez 25'53"; Colmenárez 32'23"; Gutiérrez 34'04"	Report	Vlasenko 14'24", 15'45"; Zaporozhets 17'02"; Shchavinska 27'58"; Yukhnovets 40'49"

CID Arena
Referee: Alexis Vaughan (CAN), Malika Chihaoui (ALG)
1 November 2026
17:30

Senegal	8–1	Fiji
Niang 0'47", 1'42", 28'30", 30'44"; Faty 17'33"; Keresoni 19'04" (o.g.); Kande 35'36"; Diallo 39'42"	Report	Katonitabua 17'44"

CID Arena
Referee: Juliana Angelo (BRA), Lorena Sánchez (ARG)

3 November 2026
15:30

Ukraine	5–1	Fiji
Ruchka 0'34", 27'34"; Zaporozhets 12'42"; Vlasenko 25'25"; Shevchuk 29'48"	Report	Botesulu 19'24"

CID Arena
Referee: Zahra Rahimi (IRI), Najat Al-Blooshi (UAE)
3 November 2026
17:30

Senegal	0–1	Venezuela
	Report	Gutiérrez 36'26"

CID Arena
Referee: Fatma Tursun (TUR), Roosamaria Tuomi (FIN)

5 November 2026
15:30

Fiji	0–6	Venezuela
	Report	Rodríguez 2'01"; Aguilar 14'49"; Colmenárez 27'05"; Paz 29'43", 34'07"; Gutiérrez 31'36"

CID Arena
Referee: Fatma Tursun (TUR), Malika Chihaoui (ALG)
5 November 2026
17:30

Ukraine	7–2	Senegal
Hordiienko 7'00", 22'56"; Shevchuk 7'59"; Ruchka 12'12", 39'07"; Yukhnovets 18'01" (pen.); Kandé 24'15" (o.g.)	Report	Hordiienko 7'24" (o.g.); Diallo 34'13"

CID Arena
Referee: Alexis Vaughan (CAN), Zahra Rahimi (IRI)

=== Group B ===
Pos	Team	Pld	W	W+	WP	L	GF	GA	GD	Pts	Qualification
1	Iran	3	3	0	0	0	11	4	+7	9	Semifinals
2	Italy	3	2	0	0	1	9	6	+3	6	Semifinals
3	Cameroon	3	1	0	0	2	12	9	+3	3	
4	Costa Rica	3	0	0	0	3	1	14	−13	0	

Source: Dakar 2026
1 November 2026
10:00

Costa Rica	0–3	Iran
	Report	Mohammadi 15'44"; Rahmani 22'32"; Amirmohseni 36'39"

CID Arena
Referee: Vilde Stenseth (NOR), Fatma Tursun (TUR)
1 November 2026
12:00

Italy	4–2	Cameroon
Melfi 3'55", 21'38", 32'19"; Moro 23'18"	Report	Mimbama 36'13"; Elong 37'41"

CID Arena
Referee: Najat Al-Blooshi (UAE), Nour Chaito (LBN)

3 November 2026
10:00

Italy	4–1	Costa Rica
Zappia 4'37", 19'32", 20'43", 30'11"	Report	Cedeno 25'37°

CID Arena
Referee: Lorena Sánchez (ARG), Juliana Angelo (BRA)
3 November 2026
12:00

Iran	5–3	Cameroon
Rahmani 12'24"; Amirmohseni 13'35", 22'53"; Mohammadi 16'34"; Rezaei 34'18"	Report	Mimbama 2'11", 16'47"; Miyanui 8'19"

CID Arena
Referee: Jasmina Mickoska (SRB), Alexis Vaughan (CAN)

5 November 2026
10:00

Iran	3–1	Italy
Hosseinipour 7'33", 23'25"; Rezaei 22'41"	Report	Gallus 32'10"

CID Arena
Referee: Vilde Stenseth (NOR), Najat Al-Blooshi (UAE)
5 November 2026
12:00

Cameroon	7–0	Costa Rica
Ugalde 2'20" (o.g.); Oyie 4'37"; Elong 13'59", 30'25"; Mimbama 21'01"; Espinoza 24'05" (o.g.); Miyanui 24'27"	Report

CID Arena
Referee: Lorena Sanchez (ARG), Jasmina Mickoska (SRB)

== Knockout stage ==
=== Bracket ===
Semifinals
8 November – Dakar Arena
Iran	2
Venezuela (a.e.t.)	3
8 November – Dakar Arena
Ukraine	3
Italy	1

Gold medal match
11 November – Dakar Arena
Venezuela	3
Ukraine (a.e.t.)	4
Bronze medal match
11 November – Dakar Arena
Iran	5
Italy	2

=== Semifinals ===
8 November 2026
11:00

Iran	2–3 (a.e.t.)	Venezuela
Yari 34'54", 38'09"	Report	Paz 7'56"; Aguilar 32'17"; Colmenárez 45'29"

Dakar Arena
Referee: Jasmina Mickoska (SRB), Fatma Tursun (TUR)
8 November 2026
15:00

Ukraine	3–1	Italy
Vlasenko 10'28"; Yukhnovets 17'51"; Zaporozhets 18'43"	Report	Zaporozhets 12'55" (o.g.)

Dakar Arena
Referee: Lorena Sánchez (ARG), Najat Al-Blooshi (UAE)

=== Bronze medal match ===
11 November 2026
11:00

Iran	5–2	Italy
Melfi 15'47" (o.g.); Bagheri 22'30", 26'56", 34'32"; Rezaei 25'07"	Report	Moro 13'35", 15'13"

Dakar Arena
Referee: Lorena Sánchez (ARG), Juliana Angelo (BRA)

=== Gold medal match ===
11 November 2026
15:00

Venezuela	3–4 (a.e.t.)	Ukraine
	Report

Dakar Arena

== Overall ranking ==
Pos	Team	Pld	W	W+	WP	L	GF	GA	GD	Pts
1	Ukraine	5	3	2	0	0	24	11	+13	13
2	Venezuela	5	2	1	0	2	17	11	+6	8
3	Iran	5	4	0	0	1	18	9	+9	12
4	Italy	5	2	0	0	3	12	14	−2	6
5	Cameroon	3	1	0	0	2	12	9	+3	3
6	Senegal (H)	3	1	0	0	2	10	9	+1	3
7	Costa Rica	3	0	0	0	3	1	14	−13	0
8	Fiji	3	0	0	0	3	2	19	−17	0

Source: Dakar 2026
Rules for classification: (5th to 8th place) 1) points; 2) goal difference; 3) goals scored; 4) equal ranking if still tied (regulations Article 15.6).
(H) Host

== Goalscorers ==
There were 96 goals scored in 16 matches, for an average of 6 goals per match.
