= Antrum =

This is a disambiguation page for the biological term. For the 2018 horror movie, see Antrum (film)

In biology, antrum is a general term for a cavity or chamber, which may have specific meaning in reference to certain organs or sites in the body.

In vertebrates, it may refer specifically to:

- Antrum follicularum, the cavity in the epithelium that envelops the oocyte
- Mastoid antrum, a cavity between the middle ear and temporal bone in the skull
- Stomach antrum, either
  - Pyloric antrum, the lower portion of the stomach. This is what is usually referred to as "antrum" in stomach-related topics
  - or Antrum cardiacum, a dilation that occurs in the esophagus near the stomach (forestomach)
- Maxillary antrum or antrum of Highmore, the maxillary sinus, a cavity in the maxilla and the largest of the paranasal sinuses

In invertebrates, it may refer specifically to:

- Antrum of female lepidoptera genitalia
