= Beach handball at the 2026 Summer Youth Olympics =

Beach handball at the IV Summer Youth Olympic Games
- Venue: Saly Beach
- Dates: 9 – 13 November 2026
- Competitors: 160 (80 boys + 80 girls) from 15 nations
- Teams: 216 (108 boys and 108 girls)

Beach handball at the 2026 Summer Youth Olympics was held from November 9 to 13 in Saly, Senegal.

== Qualification ==
The draw was held on 22 July 2026 in Basel, Switzerland.

=== Men ===
Group A
Pos	Team
A1	Germany
A2	Tunisia
A3	Thailand
A4	Cook Islands

Group B
Pos	Team
B1	Brazil
B2	Hungary
B3	Puerto Rico
B4	Senegal (host)

=== Women ===
Group A
Pos	Team
A1	Spain
A2	Croatia
A3	China
A4	Mexico

Group B
Pos	Team
B1	Uruguay
B2	France
B3	Kenya
B4	Senegal (host)

== Medal summary ==
=== Medal table ===
* Host nation (Senegal)

Rank	Nation	Gold	Silver	Bronze	Total
1	Germany	1	0	0	1
1	Uruguay	1	0	0	1
3	Brazil	0	1	0	1
3	Spain	0	1	0	1
5	Senegal*	0	0	2	2
Totals (5 entries)		2	2	2	6

=== Medalists ===
Event	Gold	Silver	Bronze
Men	Germany; Dave Biyah; Mads Krüger; Lenn Reinhard; Tim Perse; Luuk Seibert; Tayo Finnberg Rodriguez; Nikolas Knipping; Thure Bielfeldt; Peter Szabady; Lennart Otte	Brazil; Tiago Azevedo; André de Souza; Tulio Castro; Giovani Brandão; Raphael Martins; Diego Luna; Luiz Ferreira; José dos Santos; Talisson Andrade; Kaike Silveira	Senegal; Mouhamed Thiam; Mouhamed Sidibe; Serigne Babacar Diop; Wally Thiam; Amadou Ndiaye; Saliou Diop; Moussa Balla Sall; Mamour Diop; Mamadou Sonko; Abdourahmane Diop
Women	Uruguay; Valentina Champret; Florencia Benítez; Clara Fajardo; Melina Pérez; Josefina Odera; Julia Rotundo; Serena Epherre; Joaquina Testorelli; Julietta Villar; Ivana Viñas	Spain; Iris Santana; Marta Bouzo; Ana Jaime; Victoria Gómez; Iraia Berroeta; Berta Buded; María Arnay; Berta Mena; Laura Linares; Nora Morello	Senegal; Awa Bousso Ba; Fama Mar; Bineta Ba; Mariama Diaw; Aïta Ndiaye; Latdara Ndoye; Mbayang Diallo; Maman Coumba Diop; Fatimata Boucar Sow; Oumou Diop
