= Cook Islands at the 2010 Summer Youth Olympics =

- IOC code: COK
- NOC: Cook Islands Sports and National Olympic Committee

in Singapore
- Competitors: 18 in 3 sports
- Flag bearer: Teau Moana McKenzie
- Medals: Gold 0 Silver 0 Bronze 0 Total 0

Summer Youth Olympics appearances
- 2010; 2014; 2018

Cook Islands participated in the 2010 Summer Youth Olympics in Singapore.

The Cook Islands squad consisted of 18 athletes competing in 3 sports: aquatics (swimming), handball and sailing.

== Handball ==
| Squad List | Event | Group Stage | | 5th Place Playoffs | | Rank |
| Squad List | Event | Group A | Rank | 1st Match | 2nd Match | Rank |
|---|---|---|---|---|---|---|
| Munokoa Elikana; Cruz Robati; Terence Munro; Volunteer Tokorangi; Peter Tuaratini; Neilsen Turoa Kamana; Tangimetua Tangimetua; Reed Akapi Cowan; Mana Ngaau; Tapi Mataora; Peter Kermode; Gerald Piho; Te Koyo Tai Nimeti; Aurand Tou | Boys' Handball | France; L 4-58 | 3 | Singapore; L 20-27 | Singapore; L 18-32 | 6 |
| Munokoa Elikana; Cruz Robati; Terence Munro; Volunteer Tokorangi; Peter Tuaratini; Neilsen Turoa Kamana; Tangimetua Tangimetua; Reed Akapi Cowan; Mana Ngaau; Tapi Mataora; Peter Kermode; Gerald Piho; Te Koyo Tai Nimeti; Aurand Tou | Boys' Handball | South Korea; L 4-70 | 3 | Singapore; L 20-27 | Singapore; L 18-32 | 6 |

== Sailing ==
One Person Dinghy

| Athlete | Event | Race | | | | | | | | | | | | Points | Rank |
| Athlete | Event | 1 | 2 | 3 | 4 | 5 | 6 | 7 | 8 | 9 | 10 | 11 | M* | Points | Rank |
|---|---|---|---|---|---|---|---|---|---|---|---|---|---|---|---|
| Aquila Tatira | Boys' Byte CII | 23 | 23 | 13 | ~~27~~ | 26 | 22 | 19 | 15 | ~~28~~ | 23 | 15 | 25 | 204 | 24 |
| Teau Moana McKenzie | Girls' Byte CII | 25 | ~~30~~ | 29 | 30 | 26 | ~~DSQ~~ | 29 | 28 | 29 | 28 | 27 | 29 | 280 | 31 |

== Swimming ==
| Athletes | Event | Heat | | Semifinal | | Final | |
| Athletes | Event | Time | Position | Time | Position | Time | Position |
|---|---|---|---|---|---|---|---|
| Aaron Brown | Boys' 50m Freestyle | 26.70 | 36 | Did not advance | | | |
| Celeste Brown | Girls' 50m Freestyle | 29.40 | 43 | Did not advance | | | |
