= Cook Islands at the 2014 Summer Youth Olympics =

- IOC code: COK
- NOC: Cook Islands Sports and National Olympic Committee

in Nanjing
- Competitors: 4 in 3 sports

Summer Youth Olympics appearances
- 2010; 2014; 2018

Cook Islands competed at the 2014 Summer Youth Olympics, in Nanjing, China from 16 August to 28 August 2014.

== Golf ==
Cook Islands was given a team of 2 athletes to compete from the Tripartite Commission.

Individual

Athlete	Event	Round 1		Round 2			Round 3			Total	
Athlete	Event	Score	Rank	Score	Total	Rank	Score	Total	Rank	Score	Rank
Rayman Kiria	Boys	+20	31	+19	+39	31	+13	+52	31	+52	31
Memory Akama	Girls	+16	30	+22	+38	29	+27	+65	29	+65	29

Team

Athletes	Event	Round 1 (Foursome)		Round 2 (Fourball)			Round 3 (Individual Stroke)				Total	
Athletes	Event	Score	Rank	Score	Total	Rank	Boy	Girl	Total	Rank	Score	Rank
Rayman Kiria; Memory Akama	Mixed	+6	30	+15	+21	30	+20	+16	+57	30	+57	30

== Sailing ==
Cook Islands qualified one boat based on its performance at the Byte CII Oceania Continental Qualifiers.

Athlete	Event	Race											Net Points	Final Rank
Athlete	Event	1	2	3	4	5	6	7	8	9	10	M*	Net Points	Final Rank
Joshua Ioane	Boys' Byte CII	26	28	27	28	28	~~29~~	28	CAN			27	192	29

== Swimming ==
Cook Islands qualified one swimmer.

Boys

Athlete	Event	Heat		Semifinal		Final	
Athlete	Event	Time	Rank	Time	Rank	Time	Rank
Temaruata Strickland	50 m freestyle	27.54	44	did not advance			
