= Cook Islands at the 2018 Summer Youth Olympics =

- IOC code: COK
- NOC: Cook Islands Sports and National Olympic Committee

in Buenos Aires, Argentina 6 – 18 October 2018
- Competitors: 1 in 1 sports
- Medals: Gold 0 Silver 0 Bronze 0 Total 0

Summer Youth Olympics appearances
- 2010; 2014; 2018

Cook Islands participated at the 2018 Summer Youth Olympics in Buenos Aires, Argentina from 6 October to 18 October 2018.

== Swimming ==
The Cook Islands qualified 1 athlete.

Boys

Athlete	Event	Heats		Semifinals		Final	
Athlete	Event	Time	Rank	Time	Rank	Time	Rank
Bede Aitu	50 metre backstroke	28.90	24	did not advance			
Bede Aitu	100 metre backstroke	1:03.49	25	did not advance			
