= Rugby sevens at the 2026 Summer Youth Olympics =

Rugby sevens at the IV Summer Youth Olympic Games
- Venue: Complexe Iba Mar Diop
- Dates: 1–3 November 2026
- Competitors: 192 (96 men + 96 women) from 15 nations
- Teams: 16 (8 men and 8 women)

Rugby sevens at the 2026 Summer Youth Olympics was held from November 1 to 3 at the Complexe Iba Mar Diop in Dakar, Senegal.

== Qualification ==
Details of the draw were published on 11 August 2026. Initially Samoa was listed as participants in Group B of the men's tournament. In September 2026 they were replaced by Uganda for unknown reasons.

=== Men ===
Group A
Team
Canada
Germany
Senegal (host)
South Africa

Group B
Team
Argentina
France
Japan
Uganda

=== Women ===
Group A
Team
Australia
China
Kenya
Senegal (host)

Group B
Team
Czech Republic
Madagascar
Spain
United States

== Medal summary ==
=== Medal table ===
* Host nation (Senegal)

Rank	Nation	Gold	Silver	Bronze	Total
1	France	1	0	0	1
1	Kenya	1	0	0	1
3	Australia	0	1	0	1
3	South Africa	0	1	0	1
5	Argentina	0	0	1	1
5	Madagascar	0	0	1	1
Totals (6 entries)		2	2	2	6

=== Medalists ===
Event	Gold	Silver	Bronze
Men	France; Noah Champet; Roman Delample; Pablo Grabajosa; Gaspard Laharrague; Simon Laharrague; Matt Lefeuvre; Sacha Leroy; Dorian Petitgenet; Nicolas Ripert; Nathanaël Senga Kouo; Matéo Tambo Fantcho; Jules Vermeulen	South Africa; Werner de Bruin; Dandré Brink; Jake Dave; Darnell Delport; Corné Ferreira; Thubelihle Marule; Siphesihle Marule; Divan Meyer; Albert Nel; Kingsley Pule; James Sale; Rosco Williams	Argentina; Santiago Abbondati; Federico Anderson; Ramón Benedit; Gonzalo Cairo; Joaquín Cocomarola; Benjamín Fossati; Tomás Galetti; Federico Kantz; Felipe Ledesma; Juan Bautista Maris; Santiago Martos; Joaquín Zapiola
Women	Kenya; Evalyne Afande; Mitchelle Chemtai; Zain Hido; Josphine Kerubo; Bridgit Lihanda; Micheal Mmboga; Joy Murigi; Elizabeth Naliaka; Scovia Odhiambo; Shaheen Sada; Christie Wanjiku; Diana Wanjiku	Australia; Billie Backus; Talia Berryman; Grace Buchanan; Keira Callaghan; Peyton Fakaosilea; Aimee Henry; Darci Mackay; Ellazae Marley; Te Rina Jade Murray; Layne Prince; Cobi Ryanlast; Mia Shelley	Madagascar; Miora Andrianasolo; Tracy Ftiavananomenjanahary; Soa Landy; Fiaro Nantenaina; Finoana Rabearinoro; Jenny Rabebiarinoro; Zo Rakotonindrina; Princia Ranaivoson; Soloniaina Rasoamanarivo; Fitia Rasoanatoandro; Sariaka Raveloarisoa; Melissah Razafindravelo
