= Fatou Camara =

Fatou or Fatoumata Camara may refer to:

- Fatou Camara (journalist), Gambian television presenter and journalist
- Fatou Kiné Camara, Senegalese lawyer and women's rights campaigner
- Fatoumata Camara (wrestler), Guinean freestyle wrestler
- Fatoumata Camara (basketball)
