= Antras =

Antras may refer to:

== Communes in France ==
- Antras, Ariège, in the Ariège department
- Antras, Gers, in the Gers department

== People with the surname ==
- Pol Antràs (born 1975), Catalan economist
