= Uruguay at the 2026 Summer Youth Olympics =

- Flag of Uruguay
- IOC code: URU
- NOC: Uruguayan Olympic Committee
- Website: www.cou.org.uy

in Dakar, Senegal October 31, 2026 – November 13, 2026
- Competitors: 11 in 2 sports
- Flag bearers: Luciana de Armas & Federico Castell
- Medals: Gold 1 Silver 0 Bronze 0 Total

Summer Youth Olympics appearances
- 2010; 2014; 2018; 2026

Uruguay is scheduled to compete at the 2026 Summer Youth Olympics in Dakar, Senegal from October 31 to November 13, 2026. This will mark Uruguay's fourth appearance at the Youth Olympics, after making its debut in 2010.

Swimmers Luciana de Armas and Federico Castell served as the flag bearers for the opening ceremony.

== Competitors ==
The following is the list of number of competitors participating at the Games per sport/discipline.

Sport	Men	Women	Total
Athletics	1	1	2
Beach handball	0	10	10
Skateboarding	0	1	1
Swimming	1	1	2
Taekwondo	1	0	1
Triathlon	1	0	1
Total	4	13	16

== Athletics ==
Uruguay entered two athletes, one male and one female.

=== Track & road events ===
Men

Athlete	Event	Heat		Semifinal		Final	
Athlete	Event	Result	Rank	Result	Rank	Result	Rank
Felipe Malgor	400 m hurdles						

Women

Athlete	Event	Heat		Semifinal		Final	
Athlete	Event	Result	Rank	Result	Rank	Result	Rank
Antonella Bonomi	2000 m steeplechase						

== Beach handball ==
Uruguay entered a team for the women's tournament.

Summary

Event	Group stage				Quarterfinals	5th-8th Classification	Semifinals	Final / PG / BM	
Event	Opposition Result	Opposition Result	Opposition Result	Rank	Opposition Result	Opposition Result	Opposition Result	Opposition Result	Rank
Women's tournament	Kenya; W 2-0	Senegal; W 2-1	France; W 2-1	1	Mexico; W 2-0		France; W 2-1	Spain; W 2-1	1st place, gold medalist(s)

Roster

- Florencia Benítez
- Valentina Champret
- Serena Epherre
- Clara Fajardo
- Josefina Odera
- Melina Pérez
- Julia Rotundo
- Joaquina Testorelli
- Julietta Villar
- Ivana Viñas

== Swimming ==
Uruguay entered two swimmers, one male and one female.

Athlete	Event	Heat		Semifinal		Final	
Athlete	Event	Time	Rank	Time	Rank	Time	Rank
Federico Castell	100 m freestyle						
Federico Castell	100 m backstroke						
Federico Castell	50 m breaststroke						
Luciana de Armas	50 m butterfly						
Luciana de Armas	100 m butterfly						

== Taekwondo ==
For taekwondo Uruguay entered one male athlete.

Men

Athlete	Event	Round of 16	Quarterfinals	Semifinals	Repechage	Final / BM	
Athlete	Event	Opposition Result	Opposition Result	Opposition Result	Opposition Result	Opposition Result	Rank
Rodrigo Varietti	-63 kg						

== Triathlon ==
Uruguay entered one male athlete.

Athlete	Event	Time						Rank
Athlete	Event	Swim (750m)	Trans 1	Bike (20km)	Trans 2	Run (5km)	Total	Rank
Elías Medina	Men's individual							
