= Kenya at the 2026 Summer Youth Olympics =

- Flag of Kenya
- IOC code: KEN
- NOC: National Olympic Committee of Kenya
- Website: www.teamkenya.or.ke

in Dakar, Senegal October 31, 2026 – November 13, 2026
- Competitors: 51 in 11 sports
- Flag bearers: Windfridah Msavi & Calvin Omweri
- Medals: Gold 0 Silver 0 Bronze 0 Total 0

Summer Youth Olympics appearances
- 2010; 2014; 2018; 2026

Kenya is scheduled to compete at the 2026 Summer Youth Olympics in Dakar, Senegal from October 31 to November 13, 2026. This will mark Kenya's fourth appearance at the Youth Olympics, after making its debut in 2010.

Baseball5 player Windfridah Msavi and beach wrestler Calvin Omweri served as the flag bearers for the opening ceremony.

== Competitors ==
The following is the list of number of competitors participating at the Games per sport/discipline.

Sport	Men	Women	Total
3x3 basketball	0	4	4
Athletics	4	3	7
Baseball5	4	4	8
Beach handball	0	10	10
Beach wrestling	1	1	2
Boxing	0	1	1
Fencing	0	1	1
Judo	0	1	1
Rugby sevens	0	12	12
Swimming	2	2	4
Triathlon	1	0	1
Total	12	39	51

== 3x3 basketball ==
Kenya entered a team for the women's tournament as one of the two participating teams from the Americas.

Summary

Event	Pool play			Quarterfinal	Semifinal	Final / BM	
Event	Opposition Score	Opposition Score	Group Rank	Opposition Score	Opposition Score	Opposition Score	Rank
Women's tournament							

Roster

- Scholasticah Amuhaya
- Vivian Moraa
- Brenda Ochieng
- Chelsea Onamu

== Athletics ==
Kenya entered seven athletes, four male and three female.

=== Track & road events ===
Men

Athlete	Event	Semifinal		Final	
Athlete	Event	Result	Rank	Result	Rank
David Sekento	800 m				
Enock Tuitoek	3000 m				
Wesley Kipkech	2000 m steeplechase				

Women

Athlete	Event	Semifinal		Final	
Athlete	Event	Result	Rank	Result	Rank
Abigael Chepkirui	1500 m	—N/a			
Faith Rono	3000 m				
Abigael Kosgei	2000 m steeplechase				
Cecilia Njeri	5000 m race walk				

== Baseball5 ==
Kenya entered a team as one of the two participating teams from Africa.

Summary

Event	Group stage				Quarterfinals	Semifinals	Final / PG / BM	
Event	Opposition Result	Opposition Result	Opposition Result	Rank	Opposition Result	Opposition Result	Opposition Result	Rank
Mixed tournament								

Roster

- Ivon Kaiga
- Brighton Kelly
- Judith Kitu
- Shantel Lucianah
- Winfridah Msavi
- Duncan Odhiambo
- David Odhiambo
- Polycap Owino

== Beach handball ==
Kenya entered a team for the women's tournament.

Summary

Event	Group stage				Quarterfinals	5th–8th classification	Semifinals	Final / PG / BM	
Event	Opposition Result	Opposition Result	Opposition Result	Rank	Opposition Result	Opposition Result	Opposition Result	Opposition Result	Rank
Women's tournament	Uruguay	France	Senegal						

Roster

- Mary Abogi
- Furaha Ali
- Phelisia Amaya
- Lilian Charo
- Neema Chembe
- Sheryl Juma
- Dorcus Kigasia
- Pauline Musaa
- Grace Simiyu
- Mercy Wayonyi

== Beach wrestling ==
Kenya entered two athletes, one of each gender.

Men

Team	Event	Group stage				Semifinals	Final / BM	
Team	Event	Opposition Result	Opposition Result	Opposition Result	Rank	Opposition Result	Opposition Result	Rank
Calvin Omweri	–70 kg							

Women

Team	Event	Group stage				Semifinals	Final / BM	
Team	Event	Opposition Result	Opposition Result	Opposition Result	Rank	Opposition Result	Opposition Result	Rank
Jemimah Wanjala	–65 kg							

== Boxing ==
Kenya entered one female athlete in the −51 kg category.

Women

Athlete	Weight	Round of 16	Quarterfinals	Semifinals	Final	
Athlete	Weight	Opposition Result	Opposition Result	Opposition Result	Opposition Result	Rank
Ella Demesi	–51 kg					

== Fencing ==
Kenya entered one female athlete.

Women

Athlete	Event	Pool round		Round of 16	Quarterfinals	Semifinals	Final / BM	
Athlete	Event	Opposition Score	Seed	Opposition Score	Opposition Score	Opposition Score	Opposition Score	Rank
Aliyah Makena	epée							

== Judo ==
Kenya entered one female judoka based on the available quotas assigned by the International Judo Federation.

Women

Athlete	Event	Round of 16	Quarterfinals	Semifinals	Repechage 1	Repechage 2	Final	
Athlete	Event	Opposition Result	Opposition Result	Opposition Result	Opposition Result	Opposition Result	Opposition Result	Rank
Rael Imase	–52 kg	Bye						

== Rugby sevens ==
Kenya entered a team for the women's tournament.

Summary

Event	Group stage				Semifinal	Final / BM	
Event	Opposition Score	Opposition Score	Opposition Score	Group Rank	Opposition Score	Opposition Score	Rank
Women's tournament							

Roster

- Evalyne Afande
- Mitchelle Chemtai
- Zain Hido
- Josephine Kerubo
- Bridgit Lihanda
- Michael Mmboga
- Joy Murigi
- Elizabeth Naliaka
- Scovia Ohdiambo
- Shaheen Sada
- Christie Wanjiku
- Diana Wanjiku

== Swimming ==
Kenya entered two swimmers, one male and one female.

Men

Athlete	Event	Heat		Final	
Athlete	Event	Time	Rank	Time	Rank
Jeremy Rieck	50 m backstroke				
Jeremy Rieck	100 m backstroke				
Jeremy Rieck	50 m butterfly				
Jeremy Rieck	100 m butterfly				
Neo Olengo	50 m freestyle				
Neo Olengo	50 m breaststroke				
Neo Olengo	100 m breaststroke				
Neo Olengo	200 m breaststroke				

Women

Athlete	Event	Heat		Final	
Athlete	Event	Time	Rank	Time	Rank
Macrine Kalombo	100 m freestyle				
Macrine Kalombo	50 m breaststroke				
Macrine Kalombo	100 m breaststroke				
Macrine Kalombo	200 m individual medley				
Isabelle Mwangi	50 m freestyle				
Isabelle Mwangi	200 m freestyle				

== Triathlon ==
Kenya entered one male athlete.

Athlete	Event	Time						Rank
Athlete	Event	Swim (750m)	Trans 1	Bike (20km)	Trans 2	Run (5km)	Total	Rank
Robert Robin	Men's individual							
