= Futsal at the 2026 Summer Youth Olympics =

Futsal at the IV Summer Youth Olympic Games
- Venue: 2 (in two host cities)
- Dates: 1 – 12 November 2026
- Competitors: 160 (80 boys + 80 girls) from 15 nations
- Teams: 16 (8 boys + 8 girls)

Futsal at the 2026 Summer Youth Olympics was held from November 1 to 12 in Senegal.

== Venues ==
Dakar	Diamniadio
Complexe Iba Mar Diop	Dakar Arena
Capacity: 7,000	Capacity: 15,000

== Qualification ==
The draw was held on 21 May 2026 in Zurich, Switzerland.

=== Boys ===
Group A
Pos	Team
A1	Senegal (host)
A2	Argentina
A3	Panama
A4	Afghanistan

Group B
Pos	Team
B1	Portugal
B2	Morocco
B3	Solomon Islands
B4	Paraguay

=== Girls ===
Group A
Pos	Team
A1	Senegal (host)
A2	Fiji
A3	Venezuela
A4	Ukraine

Group B
Pos	Team
B1	Italy
B2	Cameroon
B3	Costa Rica
B4	Iran

== Medal summary ==
=== Medal table ===
* Host nation (Senegal)

Rank	Nation	Gold	Silver	Bronze	Total
1	Argentina	1	0	0	1
1	Ukraine	1	0	0	1
3	Portugal	0	1	0	1
3	Venezuela	0	1	0	1
5	Iran	0	0	1	1
5	Morocco	0	0	1	1
Totals (6 entries)		2	2	2	6

=== Medalists ===
Event	Gold	Silver	Bronze
Men	Argentina; Axel Barrios; Felipe González; Ezequiel Henríques; Enzo López; Agustín Mandardoni; Valentino Martínez; Joaquín Pesl; Lorenzo Sampedro; Santino Sánchez; Lisandro Velásquez	Portugal; Bernardo Borges; Artur Capistrano; João Carvalho; Ricardo Duarte; Raul Esteves; Diego Ferreira; Alexandre Gaspar; Santiago Monteiro; Tomás Sá; Tiago Salvado	Morocco; Alae Aït Challa; Mohamed Bamhamed; Hamza El Ahmadi; Youssef Haddou Ouali; Brahim Houdane; Hamza Iissi; Mohammed Karouk El Bahi; Zakariya Sarghine; Mohammed Serrar; Mohamed Touil
Women	Ukraine; Polina Serykh; Kira Hulenko; Evelina Zavhorodnia; Yeva Shchavinska; Anhelina Zaporozhets; Alina Hordiienko; Marharyta Ruchka; Adelina Vlasenko; Valeriia Yukhnovets; Oksana Shevchuk	Venezuela; Sofía Torrealba; Nelmari Aguilar; Eliannys Paz; María Briceño; Valeska Gutiérrez; Victoria Colmenarez; Flavia Rodríguez; Antonella Mejía; Alexa Velásquez; Sophya Silva	Iran; Fatemeh Shokrani; Melina Nikbakht; Nafiseh Mohammadi; Niyayesh Rahmani; Sarina Zare; Tanaz Bagheri; Hadis Yari; Setayesh Rezaei; Elnaz Hosseinipour; Narges Amirmohseni
