= Stade Iba Mar Diop =

Sports stadium in Senegal, Africa

- Location of the stadium
- Location: Médina, Dakar, Senegal
- Coordinates: 14.6797°N 17.4465°W
- Capacity: 5,000
- Surface: Grass

Construction
- Opened: 1978

Tenants
- ASC Jaraaf; US Gorée

Stade Iba Mar Diop is a multi-use stadium in Dakar, Senegal. It is currently used mostly for football matches and serves as a home ground of ASC Jaraaf and US Gorée. The stadium holds 5,000 people.

Other sports competitions are held there, such as handball, rugby, athletics and gymnastics.

The Stade Iba Mar Diop is part of the sports facilities planned for the 2026 Summer Youth Olympics. The stadium's capacity will be increased to 8,000 seats. In addition to a sports medical center and a gymnasium, the handball court will be demolished and rebuilt. It will have a new hybrid turf pitch and two additional football pitches.
