= Maria Saadi =

Moroccan sprinter and long jumper

Personal information
- Native name: ماريا السعدي
- Nationality: Moroccan
- Born: 6 December 2010 (age 15)

Sport
- Sport: Athletics
- Events: 60 metres, 100 metres, long jump
Medal record
Women's athletics
Representing Morocco
Youth Olympic Games
Silver medal – second place	2026 Dakar	Long jump
Arab U18 Championships
Gold medal – first place	2026 Cairo	100 m
Gold medal – first place	2026 Cairo	Long jump

Maria Saadi (Arabic: ماريا السعدي; Standard Moroccan Tamazight: ⵎⴰⵔⵉⴰ ⵙⴰⵄⴷⵉ; born 6 December 2010) is a Moroccan track and field athlete who competes in sprinting and the long jump.

== Career ==
On 21 February 2026, aged 15, Saadi set a Moroccan indoor record in the 60 metres, recording a time of 7.48 seconds at the French U18 Championships in Liévin, France.

In September 2026, she competed at the Arab U18 Athletics Championships in Egypt, where she won two gold medals. She won the 100 metres in 11.53 seconds and the long jump with a mark of 6.56 metres.

Her 6.56-metre long jump constituted a senior Moroccan record. Her time in the 100 metres simultaneously established Moroccan U18 and U20 records.

== Competition record ==
Year	Competition	Venue	Position	Event	Performance
2026	Arab U18 Athletics Championships	Cairo, Egypt	1st	100 metres	11.53 s
2026	Arab U18 Athletics Championships	Cairo, Egypt	1st	Long jump	6.56 m

== National records ==
- 60 metres indoor – 7.48 seconds, set on 21 February 2026 in Liévin.
- Long jump – 6.56 metres, set in September 2026 in Cairo. This is the senior Moroccan record.
- 100 metres – 11.53 seconds, set in September 2026 in Cairo. This is the Moroccan U20 record.
- 100 metres – 11.53 seconds, set in September 2026 in Cairo. This is the Moroccan U18 record.
