= Athletics at the 2026 Summer Youth Olympics – Women's long jump =

Athletics event at the 2026 Summer Youth Olympics

Women's long jump at the IV Summer Youth Olympic Games
- Venue: Complexe Iba Mar Diop
- Date: 9 November 2026
- Competitors: 9 from 9 nations
- Winning time: 5.92 m

Medalists
| 1st place, gold medalist(s) | | Poko Silvia Canape | Italy |
| 2nd place, silver medalist(s) | | Maria Saadi | Morocco |
| 3rd place, bronze medalist(s) | | Deborah Achleitner | Austria |

The women's long jump event at the 2026 Summer Youth Olympics was held on 9 November at the Complexe Iba Mar Diop in Dakar, Senegal. The event was contested as a single final, with Italy's Poko Silvia Canape winning the gold medal with a best jump of 5.92 metres.

== Schedule ==
The competition was scheduled for 9 November 2026 at 14:41 local time (UTC), at the Complexe Iba Mar Diop.

| Date | Time | Round |
|---|---|---|
| 9 November 2026 | 14:41 | Final |

== Results ==
The long jump competition consisted of a single final, in accordance with the official competition format for field events.

=== Final ===
The final was held on 9 November 2026. The competition began at 14:42 and concluded at 15:43.

| Rank | Bib | Athlete | Nation | Attempt 1 | Attempt 2 | Attempt 3 | Attempt 4 | Attempt 5 | Attempt 6 | Result | Wind |
|---|---|---|---|---|---|---|---|---|---|---|---|
| 1st place, gold medalist(s) | 187 | Poko Silvia Canape | Italy | x −1.3 | 5.39 −0.6 | x −0.9 | 5.41 −0.3 | 5.67 −1.9 | 5.92 +0.9 | 5.92 | +0.9 |
| 2nd place, silver medalist(s) | 215 | Maria Saadi | Morocco | 5.72 −1.2 | 5.89 −1.6 | 5.82 −1.0 | x +0.2 | 5.85 −1.3 | x −0.1 | 5.89 | −1.6 |
| 3rd place, bronze medalist(s) | 110 | Deborah Achleitner | Austria | 5.28 −1.9 | x −1.3 | x −1.0 | 5.41 −1.0 | 5.62 −0.6 | 5.72 −0.2 | 5.72 | −0.2 |
| 4 | 161 | Bianca Maria Vuks | Estonia | 5.47 −1.9 | 5.46 −1.1 | 5.64 −0.5 | 5.19 −1.6 | 5.58 −0.7 | x +1.0 | 5.64 | −0.5 |
| 5 | 221 | Lara Bubanja | Montenegro | 5.29 −1.1 PB | x −1.2 | 5.47 −2.3 | 5.20 −1.7 | 5.36 −0.8 | 5.42 −1.4 | 5.47 | −2.3 |
| 6 | 128 | Lixuan Liu | China | 5.12 −0.9 | – | 4.91 −1.9 | – | 5.10 −0.6 | – | 5.12 | −0.9 |
| 7 | 175 | Cayla Christopher | Grenada | x −1.3 | x −0.1 | x −1.3 | 4.24 −1.1 | 4.48 −2.0 | 4.52 −0.6 | 4.52 | −0.6 |
| 8 | 112 | Keely Deveaux | Bahamas | x −0.9 | x −1.3 | x −0.9 | – | x +0.5 | x +0.3 | NM | |
| — | 207 | Garmai Lewis | Liberia | — | — | — | — | — | — | DNS | |

Legend: x = Failed attempt; – = Passed attempt; NM = No mark; DNS = Did not start; PB = Personal best. Wind readings are shown below each attempt.
