= Gymnastics at the 2018 Asian Games – Men's pommel horse =

Men's pommel horse at the 2018 Asian Games
- Venue: Jakarta International Expo
- Date: 20–23 August 2018
- Competitors: 58 from 19 nations

Medalists
gold medal	Lee Chih-kai	Chinese Taipei
silver medal	Zou Jingyuan	China
bronze medal	Sun Wei	China

The men's pommel horse competition at the 2018 Asian Games took place on 20 and 23 August 2018 at the Jakarta International Expo Hall D2.

== Schedule ==
All times are Western Indonesia Time (UTC+07:00)

Date	Time	Event
Monday, 20 August 2018	13:00	Qualification
Thursday, 23 August 2018	17:30	Final

== Results ==
Legend

- DNS — Did not start

=== Qualification ===
Rank	Athlete	Score
1	Lee Chih-kai (TPE)	15.050
2	Zou Jingyuan (CHN)	15.000
3	Sun Wei (CHN)	15.000
4	Lin Chaopan (CHN)	14.450
5	Kenta Chiba (JPN)	14.400
6	Tomomasa Hasegawa (JPN)	14.400
7	Saeid Reza Keikha (IRI)	14.300
8	Shogo Nonomura (JPN)	14.150
9	Nariman Kurbanov (KAZ)	14.050
10	Park Min-soo (KOR)	13.950
11	Xiao Ruoteng (CHN)	13.900
12	Shiao Yu-jan (TPE)	13.650
13	Abdulla Azimov (UZB)	13.500
14	Ilyas Azizov (KAZ)	13.400
15	Akim Mussayev (KAZ)	13.400
16	Loo Phay Xing (MAS)	13.350
17	Kakeru Tanigawa (JPN)	13.250
18	Kim Han-sol (KOR)	12.950
19	Mohammad Reza Khosronejad (IRI)	12.700
20	Ri Kwang-mo (PRK)	12.650
21	Phạm Phước Hưng (VIE)	12.600
22	Đinh Phương Thành (VIE)	12.600
23	Siddharth Verma (IND)	12.600
24	Carlos Yulo (PHI)	12.550
25	Agung Suci Tantio Akbar (INA)	12.550
26	Muhammad Try Saputra (INA)	12.400
27	Lê Thanh Tùng (VIE)	12.350
28	Tan Fu Jie (MAS)	12.350
29	Yu Chao-wei (TPE)	12.200
30	Yogeshwar Singh (IND)	12.150
31	Saman Madani (IRI)	11.850
32	Lee Hyeok-jung (KOR)	11.800
33	Anton Fokin (UZB)	11.650
34	Nattipong Aeadwong (THA)	11.550
35	Yerbol Jantykov (KAZ)	11.450
36	Altansükhiin Enkhtulga (MGL)	11.350
37	Chau Jern Rong (MAS)	11.000
38	Lee Jun-ho (KOR)	11.000
39	Anawin Phothong (THA)	10.950
40	Rasuljon Abdurakhimov (UZB)	10.950
41	Muhammad Aprizal (INA)	10.700
42	Ri Yong-min (PRK)	10.550
43	Ahmed Al-Dyani (QAT)	10.450
44	Mehdi Ahmadkohani (IRI)	10.400
45	Ahmed Nabil Mosa (QAT)	10.350
46	Khusniddin Abdusamatov (UZB)	9.950
47	Ashish Kumar (IND)	9.900
48	Jamorn Prommanee (THA)	9.900
49	Jag Timbang (PHI)	9.850
50	Han Jong-hyok (PRK)	9.350
51	Đỗ Vũ Hưng (VIE)	9.100
52	Roman Pak (KGZ)	8.650
53	Agus Adi Prayoko (INA)	8.300
54	Asad Aziz Jooma (PAK)	6.950
55	Azroy Amierol Jaafar (MAS)	6.850
56	Gaurav Kumar (IND)	3.250
57	Yazan Al-Souliman (SYR)	0.000
—	Ri Se-gwang (PRK)	DNS

=== Final ===
Rank	Athlete	Score
1st place, gold medalist(s)	Lee Chih-kai (TPE)	15.400
2nd place, silver medalist(s)	Zou Jingyuan (CHN)	15.100
3rd place, bronze medalist(s)	Sun Wei (CHN)	15.075
4	Saeid Reza Keikha (IRI)	14.775
5	Park Min-soo (KOR)	14.475
6	Nariman Kurbanov (KAZ)	13.550
7	Tomomasa Hasegawa (JPN)	13.175
8	Kenta Chiba (JPN)	10.875
