= Gymnastics at the 2018 Asian Games – Men's floor =

Men's floor at the 2018 Asian Games
- Venue: Jakarta International Expo
- Date: 20–23 August 2018
- Competitors: 62 from 22 nations

Medalists
gold medal	Kim Han-sol	South Korea
silver medal	Tang Chia-hung	Chinese Taipei
bronze medal	Lin Chaopan	China

The men's floor competition at the 2018 Asian Games took place on 20 and 23 August 2018 at the Jakarta International Expo Hall D2.

== Schedule ==
All times are Western Indonesia Time (UTC+07:00)

Date	Time	Event
Monday, 20 August 2018	13:00	Qualification
Thursday, 23 August 2018	16:00	Final

== Results ==
Legend

- DNS — Did not start

=== Qualification ===
Rank	Athlete	Score
1	Carlos Yulo (PHI)	14.500
2	Tang Chia-hung (TPE)	14.450
3	Kakeru Tanigawa (JPN)	14.400
4	Kim Han-sol (KOR)	14.200
5	Xiao Ruoteng (CHN)	14.100
6	Shogo Nonomura (JPN)	14.050
7	Milad Karimi (KAZ)	14.050
8	Lin Chaopan (CHN)	14.050
9	Lee Chih-kai (TPE)	13.900
10	Lee Hyeok-jung (KOR)	13.600
11	Fuya Maeno (JPN)	13.550
12	Lee Jun-ho (KOR)	13.450
13	Sun Wei (CHN)	13.400
14	Akim Mussayev (KAZ)	13.300
15	Đinh Phương Thành (VIE)	13.200
16	Deng Shudi (CHN)	13.150
17	Ashish Kumar (IND)	13.100
18	Reyland Capellan (PHI)	13.050
19	Phạm Phước Hưng (VIE)	12.950
20	Akobir Khamrokulov (UZB)	12.900
21	Mohammad Reza Khosronejad (IRI)	12.850
22	Muhammad Try Saputra (INA)	12.750
23	Saeid Reza Keikha (IRI)	12.700
24	Agung Suci Tantio Akbar (INA)	12.700
25	Azroy Amierol Jaafar (MAS)	12.500
26	Saman Madani (IRI)	12.500
27	Abdulla Azimov (UZB)	12.450
28	Yogeshwar Singh (IND)	12.450
29	Kenta Chiba (JPN)	12.450
30	Tan Fu Jie (MAS)	12.400
31	Lê Thanh Tùng (VIE)	12.400
32	Jag Timbang (PHI)	12.300
33	Yerbol Jantykov (KAZ)	12.300
34	Rasuljon Abdurakhimov (UZB)	12.300
35	Ri Yong-min (PRK)	12.200
36	Ahmed Al-Dyani (QAT)	12.200
37	Lee Jae-seong (KOR)	12.100
38	Shiao Yu-jan (TPE)	12.000
39	Gaurav Kumar (IND)	11.950
39	Ahmed Nabil Mosa (QAT)	11.950
41	Terry Tay (SGP)	11.900
42	Tissanupan Wichianpradit (THA)	11.800
43	Yu Chao-wei (TPE)	11.800
44	Altansükhiin Enkhtulga (MGL)	11.750
45	Asad Aziz Jooma (PAK)	11.750
46	Zul Bahrin Mat Asri (MAS)	11.550
47	Khusniddin Abdusamatov (UZB)	11.500
48	Siddharth Verma (IND)	11.400
49	Ilyas Azizov (KAZ)	11.350
50	Loo Phay Xing (MAS)	11.250
51	Dwi Samsul Arifin (INA)	11.050
52	Han Jong-hyok (PRK)	11.000
53	Anawin Phothong (THA)	10.950
54	Roman Pak (KGZ)	10.900
55	Tikumporn Surintornta (THA)	10.350
56	Abdulaziz Al-Johani (KSA)	10.300
57	Jamorn Prommanee (THA)	9.900
58	Jong Ryong-il (PRK)	9.750
59	Choeun Sokden (CAM)	7.750
60	Yazan Al-Souliman (SYR)	7.100
—	Mehdi Ahmadkohani (IRI)	DNS
—	Đỗ Vũ Hưng (VIE)	DNS

=== Final ===
Rank	Athlete	Score
1st place, gold medalist(s)	Kim Han-sol (KOR)	14.675
2nd place, silver medalist(s)	Tang Chia-hung (TPE)	14.425
3rd place, bronze medalist(s)	Lin Chaopan (CHN)	14.225
4	Lee Chih-kai (TPE)	13.950
5	Milad Karimi (KAZ)	13.675
6	Xiao Ruoteng (CHN)	13.525
7	Carlos Yulo (PHI)	13.500
8	Kakeru Tanigawa (JPN)	13.425
