= Gymnastics at the 2018 Asian Games – Men's parallel bars =

Men's parallel bars at the 2018 Asian Games
- Venue: Jakarta International Expo
- Date: 20–24 August 2018
- Competitors: 58 from 20 nations

Medalists
gold medal	Zou Jingyuan	China
silver medal	Xiao Ruoteng	China
bronze medal	Kenta Chiba	Japan

The men's parallel bars competition at the 2018 Asian Games took place on 20 and 24 August 2018 at the Jakarta International Expo Hall D2.

== Schedule ==
All times are Western Indonesia Time (UTC+07:00)

Date	Time	Event
Monday, 20 August 2018	13:00	Qualification
Friday, 24 August 2018	17:30	Final

== Results ==
Legend

- DNS — Did not start

=== Qualification ===
Rank	Athlete	Score
1	Zou Jingyuan (CHN)	16.000
2	Xiao Ruoteng (CHN)	15.150
3	Lin Chaopan (CHN)	15.100
4	Shogo Nonomura (JPN)	14.950
5	Han Jong-hyok (PRK)	14.850
6	Kakeru Tanigawa (JPN)	14.750
7	Kenta Chiba (JPN)	14.650
8	Sun Wei (CHN)	14.350
9	Lee Jun-ho (KOR)	14.200
10	Fuya Maeno (JPN)	14.200
11	Lee Chih-kai (TPE)	14.000
12	Rasuljon Abdurakhimov (UZB)	13.850
13	Park Min-soo (KOR)	13.800
14	Carlos Yulo (PHI)	13.800
15	Đinh Phương Thành (VIE)	13.750
16	Akim Mussayev (KAZ)	13.700
17	Yerbol Jantykov (KAZ)	13.650
18	Lee Hyeok-jung (KOR)	13.550
19	Mohammad Reza Khosronejad (IRI)	13.500
20	Lê Thanh Tùng (VIE)	13.500
21	Kim Han-sol (KOR)	13.450
22	Ahmed Al-Dyani (QAT)	13.400
23	Rakesh Kumar Patra (IND)	13.300
24	Yu Chao-wei (TPE)	13.250
25	Gaurav Kumar (IND)	13.200
26	Phạm Phước Hưng (VIE)	13.200
27	Khusniddin Abdusamatov (UZB)	13.100
28	Loo Phay Xing (MAS)	13.050
29	Jamorn Prommanee (THA)	13.050
30	Yogeshwar Singh (IND)	13.000
31	Ilyas Azizov (KAZ)	13.000
32	Muhammad Try Saputra (INA)	12.850
33	Ri Yong-min (PRK)	12.850
34	Agung Suci Tantio Akbar (INA)	12.800
35	Terry Tay (SGP)	12.650
36	Nattipong Aeadwong (THA)	12.650
37	Ashish Kumar (IND)	12.500
38	Mehdi Ahmadkohani (IRI)	12.400
39	Jag Timbang (PHI)	12.250
40	Chau Jern Rong (MAS)	12.250
41	Azroy Amierol Jaafar (MAS)	12.200
42	Dwi Samsul Arifin (INA)	12.100
43	Anton Fokin (UZB)	12.100
44	Jim Man Hin (HKG)	12.100
44	Tissanupan Wichianpradit (THA)	12.100
46	Đỗ Vũ Hưng (VIE)	11.950
47	Abdulla Azimov (UZB)	11.850
48	Zul Bahrin Mat Asri (MAS)	11.650
49	Saman Madani (IRI)	11.550
50	Asad Aziz Jooma (PAK)	11.300
51	Anawin Phothong (THA)	10.850
52	Altansükhiin Enkhtulga (MGL)	10.750
52	Shiao Yu-jan (TPE)	10.750
54	Roman Pak (KGZ)	9.250
—	Muhammad Aprizal (INA)	DNS
—	Saeid Reza Keikha (IRI)	DNS
—	Shek Wai Hung (HKG)	DNS

=== Final ===
Rank	Athlete	Score
1st place, gold medalist(s)	Zou Jingyuan (CHN)	15.725
2nd place, silver medalist(s)	Xiao Ruoteng (CHN)	14.900
3rd place, bronze medalist(s)	Kenta Chiba (JPN)	14.850
4	Kakeru Tanigawa (JPN)	14.775
5	Han Jong-hyok (PRK)	14.725
6	Lee Chih-kai (TPE)	14.025
7	Lee Jun-ho (KOR)	13.900
8	Rasuljon Abdurakhimov (UZB)	12.875
