= Gymnastics at the 2018 Asian Games =

- Venue: Jakarta International Expo
- Dates: 20–30 August 2018
- Competitors: 191 from 25 nations

Gymnastics at the 2018 Asian Games was held at the Jakarta International Expo Hall D2, Jakarta, Indonesia, from 20 to 30 August 2018.

== Schedule ==
Q	Qualification	F	Final

Event↓/Date →	20th Mon	21st Tue	22nd Wed	23rd Thu	24th Fri	25th Sat	26th Sun	27th Mon	28th Tue	29th Wed	30th Thu	
Artistic
Men's team	Q		F									
Men's individual all-around	F											
Men's floor	Q			F								
Men's pommel horse	Q			F								
Men's rings	Q			F								
Men's vault	Q				F							
Men's parallel bars	Q				F							
Men's horizontal bar	Q				F							
Women's team		Q	F									
Women's individual all-around		F										
Women's vault		Q		F								
Women's uneven bars		Q		F								
Women's balance beam		Q			F							
Women's floor		Q			F							
Rhythmic
Women's team								F				
Women's individual all-around								Q	F			
Trampoline
Men's individual											Q	F
Women's individual											Q	F

== Medalists ==
=== Men's artistic ===
Event	Gold	Silver	Bronze
Team	China; Deng Shudi; Lin Chaopan; Sun Wei; Xiao Ruoteng; Zou Jingyuan	Japan; Kenta Chiba; Tomomasa Hasegawa; Fuya Maeno; Shogo Nonomura; Kakeru Tanigawa	South Korea; Kim Han-sol; Lee Hyeok-jung; Lee Jae-seong; Lee Jun-ho; Park Min-soo
Individual all-around	Lin Chaopan; China	Shogo Nonomura; Japan	Xiao Ruoteng; China
Floor	Kim Han-sol; South Korea	Tang Chia-hung; Chinese Taipei	Lin Chaopan; China
Pommel horse	Lee Chih-kai; Chinese Taipei	Zou Jingyuan; China	Sun Wei; China
Rings	Deng Shudi; China	Shogo Nonomura; Japan	Chen Chih-yu; Chinese Taipei
Vault	Shek Wai Hung; Hong Kong	Kim Han-sol; South Korea	Agus Adi Prayoko; Indonesia
Parallel bars	Zou Jingyuan; China	Xiao Ruoteng; China	Kenta Chiba; Japan
Horizontal bar	Tang Chia-hung; Chinese Taipei	Sun Wei; China	Xiao Ruoteng; China

=== Women's artistic ===
Event	Gold	Silver	Bronze
Team	China; Chen Yile; Liu Jinru; Liu Tingting; Luo Huan; Zhang Jin	North Korea; Jon Jang-mi; Jong Un-gyong; Kim Su-jong; Kim Won-yong; Pyon Rye-yong	Japan; Soyoka Hanawa; Shiho Nakaji; Yumika Nakamura; Yuki Uchiyama; Yurika Yumoto
Individual all-around	Chen Yile; China	Luo Huan; China	Kim Su-jong; North Korea
Vault	Yeo Seo-jeong; South Korea	Oksana Chusovitina; Uzbekistan	Pyon Rye-yong; North Korea
Uneven bars	Liu Tingting; China	Luo Huan; China	Jon Jang-mi; North Korea
Balance beam	Chen Yile; China	Kim Su-jong; North Korea	Zhang Jin; China
Floor	Kim Su-jong; North Korea	Rifda Irfanaluthfi; Indonesia	Shiho Nakaji; Japan

=== Rhythmic ===
Event	Gold	Silver	Bronze
Team	Kazakhstan; Dayana Abdirbekova; Alina Adilkhanova; Adilya Tlekenova	Uzbekistan; Asal Ikramova; Dildora Rakhmatova; Sabina Tashkenbaeva; Nurinisso Usmanova	South Korea; Kim Chae-woon; Kim Joo-won; Lim Se-eun; Seo Go-eun
Individual all-around	Alina Adilkhanova; Kazakhstan	Sabina Tashkenbaeva; Uzbekistan	Zhao Yating; China

=== Trampoline ===
Event	Gold	Silver	Bronze
Men's individual	Dong Dong; China	Gao Lei; China	Pirmammad Aliyev; Kazakhstan
Women's individual	Liu Lingling; China	Hikaru Mori; Japan	Zhu Shouli; China

== Medal table ==
Rank	Nation	Gold	Silver	Bronze	Total
1	China (CHN)	10	6	7	23
2	South Korea (KOR)	2	1	2	5
3	Chinese Taipei (TPE)	2	1	1	4
4	Kazakhstan (KAZ)	2	0	1	3
5	North Korea (PRK)	1	2	3	6
6	Hong Kong (HKG)	1	0	0	1
7	Japan (JPN)	0	4	3	7
8	Uzbekistan (UZB)	0	3	0	3
9	Indonesia (INA)	0	1	1	2
Totals (9 entries)		18	18	18	54

== Participating nations ==
A total of 191 athletes from 25 nations competed in gymnastics at the 2018 Asian Games:

- Cambodia (1)
- China (18)
- Chinese Taipei (10)
- Hong Kong (5)
- India (10)
- Indonesia (14)
- Iran (4)
- Japan (18)
- Kazakhstan (12)
- Kyrgyzstan (3)
- Lebanon (1)
- Malaysia (11)
- Mongolia (2)
- North Korea (15)
- Pakistan (1)
- Philippines (7)
- Qatar (4)
- Saudi Arabia (2)
- Singapore (3)
- South Korea (14)
- Sri Lanka (1)
- Syria (1)
- Thailand (11)
- Uzbekistan (14)
- Vietnam (9)
