= Gymnastics at the 2018 Asian Games – Men's artistic individual all-around =

Men's artistic individual all-around at the 2018 Asian Games
- Venue: Jakarta International Expo
- Date: 20 August 2018
- Competitors: 31 from 15 nations

Medalists
gold medal	Lin Chaopan	China
silver medal	Shogo Nonomura	Japan
bronze medal	Xiao Ruoteng	China

The men's artistic individual all-around competition at the 2018 Asian Games was held on 20 August 2018 at the Jakarta International Expo Hall D2. Because of the maximum of 2 players per country rule, the other gymnasts listed are not given a ranking.

== Schedule ==
All times are Western Indonesia Time (UTC+07:00)

Date	Time	Event
Monday, 20 August 2018	13:00	Final

== Results ==
Legend

- DNF — Did not finish
- DNS — Did not start

Rank	Athlete	Floor (gymnastics)	Pommel horse	Rings (gymnastics)	Vault (gymnastics)	Parallel bars	Horizontal bar	Total
1st place, gold medalist(s)	Lin Chaopan (CHN)	14.050	14.450	14.150	14.550	15.100	14.450	86.750
2nd place, silver medalist(s)	Shogo Nonomura (JPN)	14.050	14.150	14.600	14.450	14.950	13.750	85.950
3rd place, bronze medalist(s)	Xiao Ruoteng (CHN)	14.100	13.900	14.200	13.650	15.150	14.550	85.550
4	Kakeru Tanigawa (JPN)	14.400	13.250	14.000	14.450	14.750	14.000	84.850
—	Kenta Chiba (JPN)	12.450	14.400	13.900	13.900	14.650	14.150	83.450
5	Lee Chih-kai (TPE)	13.900	15.050	13.350	14.300	14.000	11.300	81.900
6	Kim Han-sol (KOR)	14.200	12.950	14.050	14.200	13.450	13.000	81.850
7	Carlos Yulo (PHI)	14.500	12.550	13.900	13.950	13.800	12.050	80.750
8	Lê Thanh Tùng (VIE)	12.400	12.350	13.250	14.650	13.500	13.550	79.700
9	Lee Jun-ho (KOR)	13.450	11.000	13.500	13.400	14.200	14.100	79.650
10	Akim Mussayev (KAZ)	13.300	13.400	13.200	14.100	13.700	11.600	79.300
11	Mohammad Reza Khosronejad (IRI)	12.850	12.700	13.500	12.600	13.500	12.400	77.550
12	Yu Chao-wei (TPE)	11.800	12.200	14.150	13.650	13.250	11.850	76.900
13	Rasuljon Abdurakhimov (UZB)	12.300	10.950	13.200	13.450	13.850	12.850	76.600
14	Loo Phay Xing (MAS)	11.250	13.350	12.250	14.000	13.050	12.650	76.550
15	Abdulla Azimov (UZB)	12.450	13.500	12.600	13.700	11.850	12.300	76.400
16	Yogeshwar Singh (IND)	12.450	12.150	12.650	14.150	13.000	11.550	75.950
17	Ilyas Azizov (KAZ)	11.350	13.400	13.000	13.500	13.000	10.750	75.000
18	Agung Suci Tantio Akbar (INA)	12.700	12.550	11.650	13.850	12.800	11.300	74.850
19	Ashish Kumar (IND)	13.100	9.900	13.050	14.100	12.500	11.900	74.550
20	Saman Madani (IRI)	12.500	11.850	12.700	13.550	11.550	12.200	74.350
—	Yerbol Jantykov (KAZ)	12.300	11.450	11.850	12.650	13.650	12.350	74.250
21	Ri Yong-min (PRK)	12.200	10.550	13.000	13.850	12.850	11.500	73.950
22	Jag Timbang (PHI)	12.300	9.850	11.600	13.700	12.250	11.800	71.500
23	Azroy Amierol Jaafar (MAS)	12.500	6.850	12.600	13.400	12.200	12.200	69.750
24	Altansükhiin Enkhtulga (MGL)	11.750	11.350	11.400	13.100	10.750	10.150	68.500
—	Gaurav Kumar (IND)	11.950	3.250	13.000	12.850	13.200	12.250	66.500
25	Asad Aziz Jooma (PAK)	11.750	6.950	6.250	14.000	11.300	10.900	61.150
—	Mehdi Ahmadkohani (IRI)	DNS	10.400	14.100	DNS	12.400	12.350	DNF
—	Saeid Reza Keikha (IRI)	12.700	14.300	DNS	12.550	DNS	DNS	DNF
—	Sun Wei (CHN)	13.400	15.000	14.500	DNS	14.350	14.500	DNF
