= Gymnastics at the 2020 Summer Olympics – Men's artistic individual all-around =

Men's artistic individual all-around at the Games of the XXXII Olympiad
- Olympic artistic gymnastics
- Venue: Ariake Gymnastics Centre
- Date: 24 July 2021 (qualifying); 28 July 2021 (final)
- Competitors: 24 from 13 nations
- Winning total: 88.465 points

Medalists
1st place, gold medalist(s)		Daiki Hashimoto	Japan
2nd place, silver medalist(s)		Xiao Ruoteng	China
3rd place, bronze medalist(s)		Nikita Nagornyy	ROC

The men's artistic individual all-around event at the 2020 Summer Olympics was held on 24 and 28 July 2021 at the Ariake Gymnastics Centre. Approximately 70 gymnasts from 35 nations (of the 98 total gymnasts) competed in the all-around in the qualifying round.

Daiki Hashimoto of Japan became the youngest men's artistic gymnastics individual all-around champion in history at the age of 19, 355 days, earning his first individual Olympic (gold) medal and second Olympic medal overall. He is also Japan's second youngest gymnast to win Olympic gold, losing the youngest title to Kenzo Shirai by only 6 days. It was the third gold in a row for Japan in the men's artistic individual all-around, after two consecutive gold medals won by Kōhei Uchimura at the last two Olympics in 2012 and 2016. This victory was Japan's seventh overall, breaking the tie Japan shared with the Soviet Union, which now have one fewer at six, for the most victories in the men's individual all-around event. Hashimoto's medal also earned the Japanese gymnastics program its 100th overall Olympic medal. Chinese gymnast Xiao Ruoteng won the silver, also his first individual Olympic medal. Nikita Nagornyy of the ROC, a two-time Olympic team medalist, took the bronze. The score difference between silver and bronze was only 0.034. Nagornyy's medal is the first for Russia on the men's artistic gymnastics individual all-around event since Alexei Nemov won gold at the 2000 Summer Olympics in Sydney.

The medals for the competition were presented by Emma Terho, Finland (IOC Member), and the medalists' bouquets were presented by Arturs Mickevics, Latvia (FIG Delegate).

== Background ==
This was the 28th appearance of the men's individual all-around. The first individual all-around competition had been held in 1900, after the 1896 competitions featured only individual apparatus events. A men's individual all-around has been held every Games since 1900. Two-time defending champion Kōhei Uchimura of Japan did not qualify to attempt winning a third consecutive title, after which he choose to focus on the individual horizontal bar during qualifications. All three World all-around champions from this quad – Xiao Ruoteng of China (2017), and Artur Dalaloyan and Nikita Nagornyy of Russia (2018 and 2019) – qualified in the top six.

== Qualification ==
A National Olympic Committee (NOC) could enter up to 6 qualified gymnasts—a team of 4 and up to 2 specialist individuals. A total of 98 quota places are allocated to men's artistic gymnastics.

The 12 teams that qualify will be able to send 4 gymnasts in the team competition, for a total of 48 of the 98 quota places. The top three teams at the 2018 World Artistic Gymnastics Championships (China, Russia, and Japan) and the top nine teams (excluding those already qualified) at the 2019 World Artistic Gymnastics Championships (Ukraine, Great Britain, Switzerland, the United States, Chinese Taipei, South Korea, Brazil, Spain, and Germany) earned team qualification places.

The remaining 50 quota places are awarded individually. Each gymnast can only earn one place, except that gymnasts that competed with a team that qualified are eligible to earn a second place through the 2020 All Around World Cup Series. Some of the individual events are open to gymnasts from NOCs with qualified teams, while others are not. These places are filled through various criteria based on the 2019 World Championships, the 2020 FIG Artistic Gymnastics World Cup series, continental championships, a host guarantee, and a Tripartite Commission invitation.

Each of the 98 qualified gymnasts are eligible for the individual all-around competition, but many gymnasts do not compete in each of the apparatus events.

The COVID-19 pandemic delayed many of the events for qualifying for gymnastics. The 2018 and 2019 World Championships were completed on time, but many of the World Cup series events were delayed into 2021.

== Competition format ==
The top 24 qualifiers in the qualification phase (limit two per NOC) advanced to the all-around final. The finalists performed an additional exercise on each apparatus. Qualification scores were then ignored, with only final round scores counting. Scoring was according to the FIG Code of Points.

== Schedule ==
The competition was held over two days, 24 July and 28 July. The qualifying round (for all men's artistic gymnastics events) was on the first day with the all-around final on the second day.

All times are Japan Standard Time (UTC+9)

Date	Time	Round	Subdivision
24 July	10:00	Qualification	Subdivision 1
24 July	14:30	Qualification	Subdivision 2
24 July	19:30	Qualification	Subdivision 3
28 July	19:15	Final	–
All times are local time (UTC+09:00).

== Results ==
=== Qualifying ===
The gymnasts who ranked in the top twenty-four qualified for the final round. In a case where more than two gymnasts from the same NOC were in the top twenty-four, the last ranked among them would not qualify to final round. The next-best ranked gymnast would qualify instead.

Rank	Gymnast	Floor (gymnastics)	Pommel horse	Rings (gymnastics)	Vault (gymnastics)	Parallel bars	Horizontal bar	Total	Qualification
1	Daiki Hashimoto (JPN)	14.700	14.766	13.866	14.866	15.300	15.033	88.531	Q
2	Nikita Nagornyy (ROC)	15.066	14.366	14.333	14.700	14.966	14.466	87.897	Q
3	Xiao Ruoteng (CHN)	14.866	14.300	14.200	14.700	15.400	14.266	87.732	Q
4	Sun Wei (CHN)	14.333	14.833	14.233	14.766	15.133	14.000	87.298	Q
5	Joe Fraser (GBR)	14.066	14.666	14.400	13.833	15.400	13.933	86.298	Q
6	Artur Dalaloyan (ROC)	13.700	13.800	14.500	14.658	15.233	14.066	85.957	Q
7	Takeru Kitazono (JPN)	14.666	13.916	13.333	14.700	14.900	14.433	85.948	Q
8	Ahmet Önder (TUR)	14.600	13.333	14.366	14.333	15.200	13.833	85.665	Q
9	Kazuma Kaya (JPN)	13.933	14.833	14.366	13.200	15.100	14.033	85.465	2 per NOC
10	David Belyavskiy (ROC)	12.933	14.733	14.000	14.300	15.325	14.033	85.324	2 per NOC
11	Brody Malone (USA)	13.666	13.733	14.200	14.533	14.633	14.533	85.298	Q
12	Lin Chaopan (CHN)	13.966	14.100	13.433	14.666	14.733	14.200	85.098	2 per NOC
13	Wataru Tanigawa (JPN)	14.466	13.833	14.300	13.666	15.241	13.400	84.906	2 per NOC
14	Sam Mikulak (USA)	14.466	13.900	13.866	14.133	15.433	12.866	84.664	Q
15	Adem Asil (TUR)	14.033	12.400	14.800	15.100	14.091	14.100	84.524	Q
16	James Hall (GBR)	13.866	14.100	13.733	14.333	14.333	14.066	84.431	Q
17	Lee Chih-kai (TPE)	14.200	15.266	13.033	14.500	14.233	13.100	84.332	Q
18	Caio Souza (BRA)	13.966	13.400	14.333	14.600	14.533	13.466	84.298	Q
19	Yul Moldauer (USA)	14.866	14.233	14.033	14.133	13.900	12.933	84.098	2 per NOC
20	Lukas Dauser (GER)	13.766	13.666	13.533	13.600	15.733	13.433	83.731	Q
21	Shane Wiskus (USA)	14.733	13.366	13.866	13.000	14.700	13.700	83.365	2 per NOC
22	Tang Chia-hung (TPE)	14.333	13.000	13.833	14.400	13.966	13.400	82.932	Q
23	Giarnni Regini-Moran (GBR)	14.666	12.166	13.366	14.600	14.933	13.100	82.831	2 per NOC
24	Petro Pakhniuk (UKR)	13.566	12.866	13.466	14.100	15.333	13.400	82.731	Q
25	Milad Karimi (KAZ)	14.766	11.900	13.300	14.433	13.400	14.766	82.565	Q
26	Benjamin Gischard (SUI)	14.266	13.833	13.333	14.166	13.800	13.100	82.498	Q
27	Philipp Herder (GER)	13.733	13.233	13.333	14.533	14.500	13.100	82.432	Q
28	Lee Jun-ho (KOR)	13.733	12.900	13.700	14.433	14.266	13.366	82.398	Q
29	Aleksandr Kartsev (ROC)	13.733	13.500	13.633	14.533	14.900	12.000	82.299	2 per NOC
30	Andreas Toba (GER)	12.833	13.700	13.733	14.000	14.100	13.800	82.166	2 per NOC
31	Eddy Yusof (SUI)	13.500	12.466	13.533	14.333	14.700	13.366	81.898	Q
32	Nils Dunkel (GER)	12.933	14.133	13.600	13.533	14.433	13.000	81.632	2 per NOC
33	Christian Baumann (SUI)	13.833	12.700	13.766	13.566	15.200	12.566	81.631	2 per NOC
34	Illia Kovtun (UKR)	12.866	13.666	12.833	13.816	14.700	13.700	81.581	Q
35	Pablo Brägger (SUI)	14.133	13.566	13.466	12.733	15.066	12.600	81.564	2 per NOC
36	Diogo Soares (BRA)	14.200	12.800	13.133	14.066	13.900	13.233	81.332	Q
37	Joel Plata (ESP)	13.500	13.433	13.300	13.966	14.633	12.466	81.298	R1
38	Ludovico Edalli (ITA)	13.733	13.600	13.333	13.666	13.166	13.733	81.231	R2
39	Kim Han-sol (KOR)	14.900	11.833	13.600	14.233	13.666	12.800	81.032	R3
40	Daniel Corral (MEX)	13.200	13.266	13.366	13.933	14.033	13.100	80.898	R4

Reserves

The reserves for the individual all-around event final were:

1. Joel Plata (ESP)
2. Ludovico Edalli (ITA)
3. Kim Han-sol (KOR)
4. Daniel Corral (MEX)

Only two gymnasts from each country may advance to the all-around final. Gymnasts who did not qualify for the final because of the quota, but had high enough scores to do so were:

- Kazuma Kaya (JPN)
- David Belyavskiy (ROC)
- Lin Chaopan (CHN)
- Wataru Tanigawa (JPN)
- Yul Moldauer (USA)
- Shane Wiskus (USA)
- Giarnni Regini-Moran (GBR)

=== Final ===
Rank	Gymnast	Floor (gymnastics)	Pommel horse	Rings (gymnastics)	Vault (gymnastics)	Parallel bars	Horizontal bar	Total
1st place, gold medalist(s)	Daiki Hashimoto (JPN)	14.833	15.166	13.533	14.700	15.300	14.933	88.465
2nd place, silver medalist(s)	Xiao Ruoteng (CHN)	14.700	14.700	14.533	14.700	15.366	14.066	88.065
3rd place, bronze medalist(s)	Nikita Nagornyy (ROC)	14.433	14.266	14.666	14.900	15.400	14.366	88.031
4	Sun Wei (CHN)	14.500	14.966	14.066	14.900	14.966	14.400	87.798
5	Takeru Kitazono (JPN)	14.566	14.500	13.500	14.666	15.066	14.400	86.698
6	Artur Dalaloyan (ROC)	14.050	13.900	14.666	14.466	15.033	14.133	86.248
7	Tang Chia-hung (TPE)	14.366	13.333	14.100	14.433	13.800	14.766	84.798
8	James Hall (GBR)	14.466	13.433	13.966	14.300	14.433	14.000	84.598
9	Joe Fraser (GBR)	14.100	13.300	14.433	13.133	15.133	14.400	84.499
10	Brody Malone (USA)	14.300	14.100	13.833	14.366	13.466	14.400	84.465
11	Illia Kovtun (UKR)	14.133	14.266	13.133	13.833	14.666	13.766	83.797
12	Sam Mikulak (USA)	12.933	13.566	13.533	14.533	14.966	13.633	83.164
13	Benjamin Gischard (SUI)	14.300	13.666	13.433	14.300	13.700	13.333	82.732
14	Milad Karimi (KAZ)	15.033	13.266	12.866	14.066	13.966	13.333	82.530
15	Adem Asil (TUR)	14.300	13.166	13.700	15.133	12.600	13.600	82.499
16	Eddy Yusof (SUI)	13.800	13.866	13.300	13.033	14.533	13.200	81.732
17	Caio Souza (BRA)	12.933	12.133	14.500	14.200	14.500	13.266	81.532
18	Lukas Dauser (GER)	13.533	13.566	13.325	13.433	15.400	12.033	81.290
19	Petro Pakhniuk (UKR)	13.900	13.633	13.200	14.233	13.266	13.033	81.265
20	Diogo Soares (BRA)	14.133	12.833	13.233	13.833	13.700	13.466	81.198
21	Lee Chih-kai (TPE)	14.400	12.666	12.733	14.400	13.900	12.600	80.699
22	Lee Jun-ho (KOR)	13.966	12.766	13.466	13.800	14.166	12.300	80.464
23	Philipp Herder (GER)	13.133	12.100	12.833	13.666	14.000	12.833	78.565
WD	Ahmet Önder (TUR)	–	12.900	13.866	14.333	–	–	DNF
