= Lee Chih-kai =

Taiwanese artistic gymnast

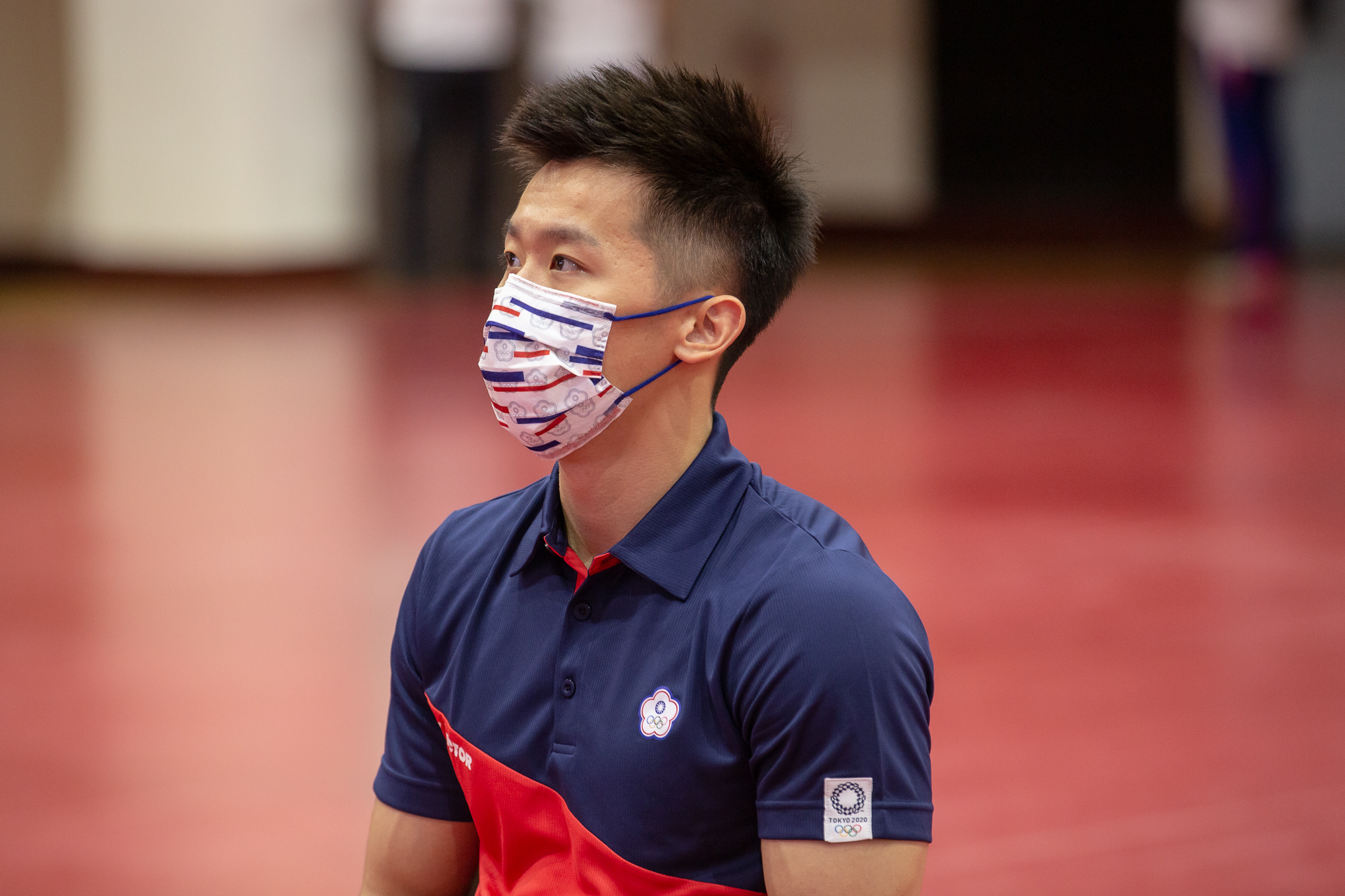
- Lee in 2021

Personal information
- Full name: Lee Chih-kai
- Born: 3 April 1996 (age 30) Yilan, Taiwan
- Height: 1.70 m (5 ft 7 in)

Gymnastics career
- Discipline: Men's artistic gymnastics
- Country represented: Chinese Taipei; (2014–present)
- Club: Taoyuan County
- Head coach: Lin Yu-hsin
Medal record
Men's artistic gymnastics
Representing Chinese Taipei
Olympic Games
Silver medal – second place	2020 Tokyo	Pommel horse
World Championships
Silver medal – second place	2019 Stuttgart	Pommel horse
Bronze medal – third place	2018 Doha	Pommel horse
Asian Games
Gold medal – first place	2018 Jakarta	Pommel horse
Gold medal – first place	2022 Hangzhou	Pommel horse
Bronze medal – third place	2022 Hangzhou	Team
Bronze medal – third place	2026 Aichi-Nagoya	Team
Asian Championships
Gold medal – first place	2019 Ulaanbaatar	All-around
Bronze medal – third place	2019 Ulaanbaatar	Team
Bronze medal – third place	2022 Doha	Team
Bronze medal – third place	2026 Zunyi	Pommel horse
Pacific Rim Championships
Gold medal – first place	2018 Medellin	Vault
Silver medal – second place	2018 Medellin	Pommel horse
Bronze medal – third place	2018 Medellin	Floor exercise
Summer Universiade
Gold medal – first place	2017 Taipei	Pommel horse
Gold medal – first place	2019 Napoli	Pommel horse
Gold medal – first place	2021 Chengdu	Pommel horse
Silver medal – second place	2019 Napoli	Team
Bronze medal – third place	2019 Napoli	All-around

Lee Chih-kai (simplified Chinese: 李智凯; traditional Chinese: 李智凱; Hanyu Pinyin: Lǐ Zhìkǎi; Tongyong Pinyin: Lǐ Jhìhkǎi; Wade–Giles: Li^{3} Chih^{4}k'ai^{3}; born 3 April 1996) is a Taiwanese artistic gymnast. He is the 2020 Olympic silver medalist in the pommel horse, and he was the first gymnast representing Chinese Taipei to win an Olympic medal. He is the 2019 World silver medalist and the 2018 World bronze medalist on the pommel horse. He is the 2018 Asian Games pommel horse champion and the 2019 Asian all-around champion. He is a three-time (2017, 2019, and 2021) Summer Universiade pommel horse champion.

== Early life ==
Lee was born in Yilan in 1996 and began training in gymnastics at the age of six by joining his elementary school's gymnastics team.

== Career ==
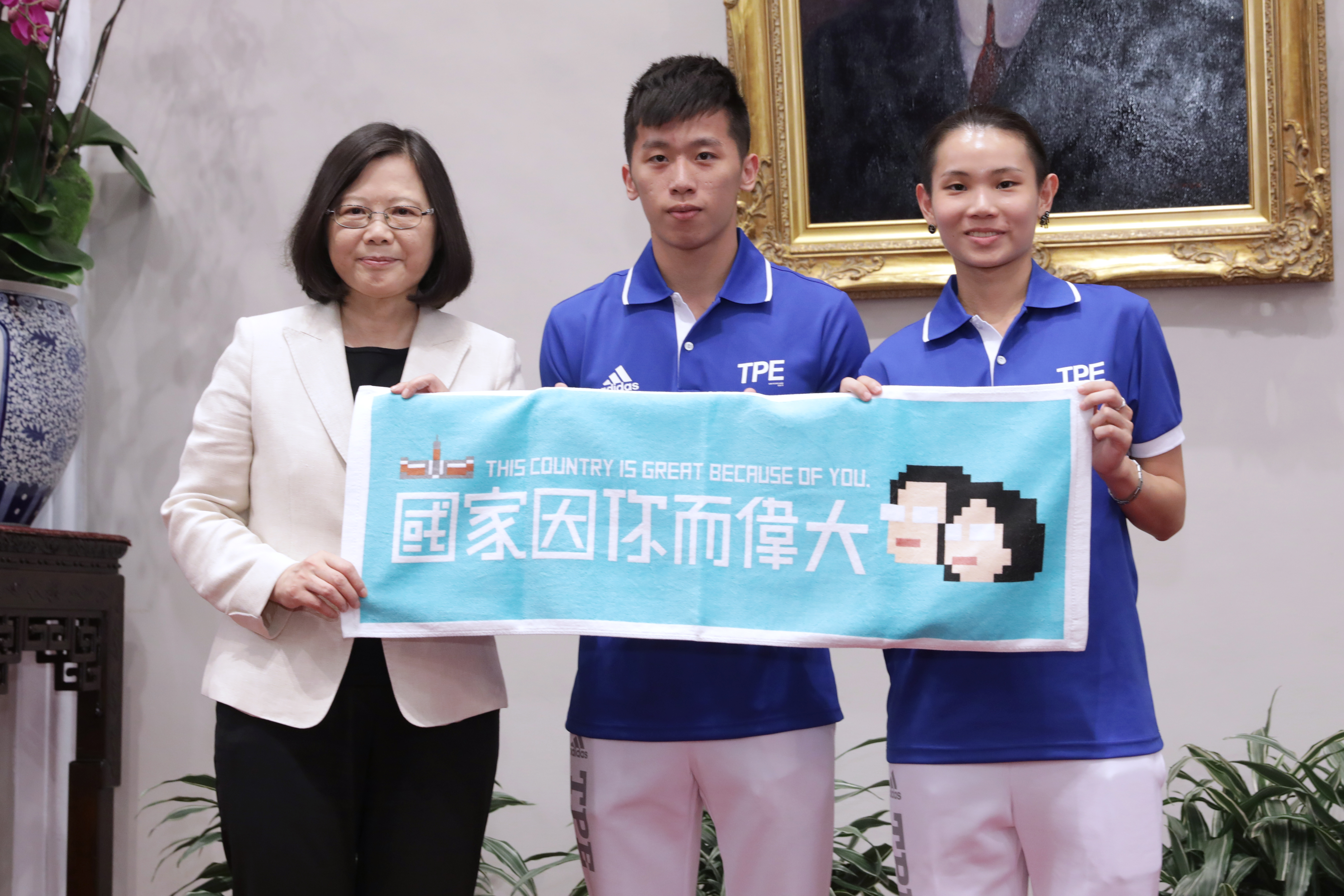
Lee (center) with President Tsai Ing-wen and fellow Olympic medalist Tai Tzu-ying

=== 2014 ===
Lee competed at the Pacific Rim Championships and helped the Chinese Taipei team finish sixth. Individually, he finished 13th in the all-around and fourth on the vault. He then represented Chinese Taipei at the 2014 Asian Games where the team finished sixth. Individually, he finished sixth in the all-around final. In the event finals, he finished eighth on the floor exercise and fifth on the vault. He then competed at the World Championships in Nanning where the Chinese Taipei team finished 24th.

=== 2015 ===
Lee represented Chinese Taipei at the 2015 Summer Universiade and helped the team finish ninth. Then at the World Championships in Glasgow, he helped the Chinese Taipei team finished 23rd. Individually, Lee finished 42nd in the all-around and qualified for the 2016 Olympic Test Event.

=== 2016 ===
In April, Lee competed at the Olympic Test Event where he finished 47th in the all-around and qualified as an individual for the 2016 Olympic Games. One month prior to the Olympics, Lee broke his foot and tore ligaments in his ankle, so he only competed on the pommel horse in Rio. He finished 31st on the pommel horse in the qualification round and did not advance into the final. This marked Chinese Taipei's highest individual finish at the Olympic Games in gymnastics.

=== 2017 ===
Lee was selected to represent Chinese Taipei at the 2017 Summer Universiade alongside Chen Jin-ling, Hsu Ping-chien, Tang Chia-hung, and Yu Chao-wei, and they finished fifth in the team competition. Individually, Lee qualified for the all-around final where he finished seventh with a total score of 82.600. Then in the pommel horse final, he won the gold medal with a score of 15.300.

=== 2018 ===
Lee competed at the Pacific Rim Championships and won the bronze medal on the floor exercise behind Americans Akash Modi and Sam Mikulak. Then in the pommel horse final, he won the silver medal behind American Marvin Kimble. He won the gold medal on the vault with an average score of 14.450. Then at the Melbourne World Cup, he won the silver medals on the pommel horse behind Nariman Kurbanov and on the vault behind Christopher Remkes. Then at the Doha World Cup, he won the silver medal on the pommel horse behind Zou Jingyuan. He won his first FIG World Cup title by winning the pommel horse title at the Osijek World Challenge Cup.

Lee was selected to represent Chinese Taipei at the 2018 Asian Games alongside Chen Chih-yu, Shiao Yu-jan, Tang Chia-hung, and Yu Chao-wei, and they finished fourth in the team competition. Lee finished fifth in the all-around with a total score of 81.900. In the event finals, he finished fifth on floor and sixth on parallel bars, and he won the gold medal on the pommel horse. At the World Championships, the Chinese Taipei team finished 17th in the qualification round. Lee finished eighth in the pommel horse and qualified for the final with a score of 13.700. He then won the bronze medal in the final behind Xiao Ruoteng and Max Whitlock. This was only the second medal Chinese Taipei had won at the World Artistic Gymnastics Championships and the first since Chang Feng-chih won the silver medal on the vault in 1993. After the World Championships, he won the gold medal on the pommel horse at the Cottbus World Cup.

=== 2019 ===
Lee won the gold medals on the pommel horse at the Melbourne World Cup and at the Doha World Cup. He then competed at the Asian Championships where the Chinese Taipei team won the bronze medal behind China and Japan. Individually, Lee won the gold medal in the all-around. In the event finals, he finished fifth on floor and sixth on pommel horse. He then represented Chinese Taipei at the 2019 Summer Universiade alongside Hsu Ping-chien and Tang Chia-hung, and they won the team silver medal behind Japan. Lee won the bronze medal in the all-around behind Kazuma Kaya and Ivan Stretovich. He defended his Universiade title on the pommel horse with a score of 15.400, 0.700 ahead of the silver medalist. He competed at the World Championships alongside Hsu Ping-chien, Shiao Yu-jan, Tang Chia-hung, and Yu Chao-wei. The team finished eighth in the qualification round and qualified a team for the 2020 Olympic Games. They also qualified for the team final where they finished sixth. Lee finished 12th in the all-around final with a total score of 83.798. He won the silver medal in the pommel horse final behind Max Whitlock.

=== 2020 ===
Lee finished eighth in the all-around at the American Cup. He was scheduled to compete at the Tokyo World Cup taking place on 4 April. However, the Tokyo World Cup was later canceled due to the coronavirus outbreak in Japan.

=== 2021 ===
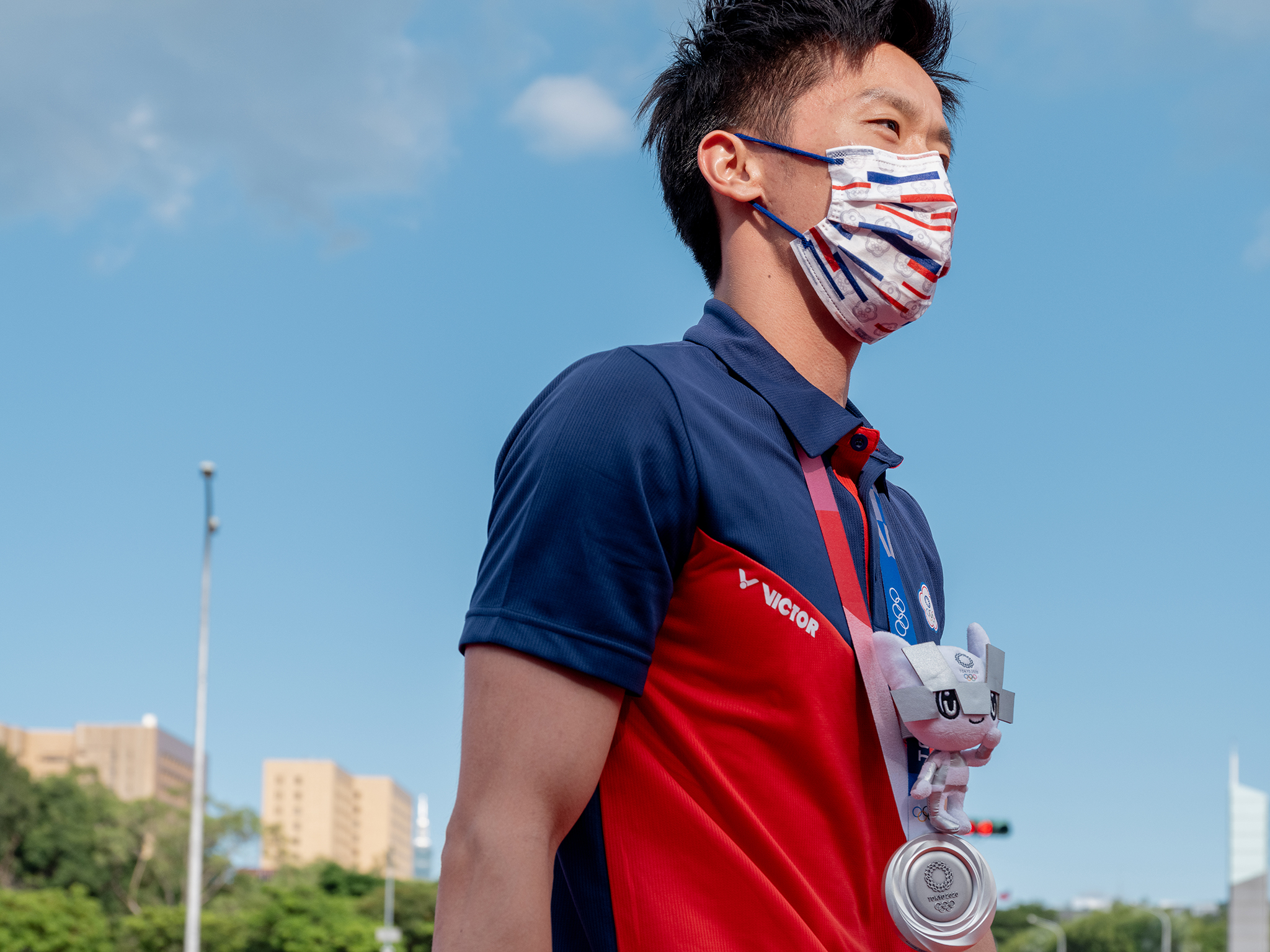
Lee with his Olympic silver medal

Lee was selected to represent Chinese Taipei at the 2020 Summer Olympics alongside Hung Yuan-hsi, Shiao Yu-jan, and Tang Chia-hung. The team finished 10th in the qualification round, making them the second reserve for the team final. Lee qualified for the all-around final in 17th place and for the pommel horse final in first place after beating Rhys McClenaghan and Kohei Kameyama in an execution score tiebreaker. In the all-around final, he finished 21st with a total score of 80.699. Then in the pommel horse final, Lee won the silver medal behind Great Britain's Max Whitlock. Although Lee had the highest execution score in the final (8.700), his difficulty score was 0.300 lower than Whitlock's, and he finished 0.183 behind Whitlock overall. This marked the first time Chinese Taipei won an Olympic medal in gymnastics.

=== 2022 ===
Lee competed at the Asian Championships and helped the Chinese Taipei team win the bronze medal behind China and Japan. He finished eighth in the all-around with a total score of 82.000, and he finished fourth in the pommel horse final. He withdrew from the 2022 World Championships after being named to the team.

== Media ==
Lee was featured in a 2005 documentary Jump! Boys which followed Lee and his elementary school gymnastics teammates. A follow-up documentary, Jump! Men, was released in 2017 and recapped Lee's journey to the 2016 Olympic Games.
