= Gymnastics at the 2022 Asian Games – Men's artistic team =

Men's team at the 2022 Asian Games
- Venue: Huanglong Gymnasium
- Date: 24 September 2023
- Competitors: 50 from 11 nations

Medalists
gold medal	China; Lan Xingyu, Lin Chaopan, Xiao Ruoteng, Zhang Boheng, Zou Jingyuan
silver medal	Japan; Shohei Kawakami, Takeru Kitazono, Kakeru Tanigawa, Wataru Tanigawa, Ryota Tsumura
bronze medal	Chinese Taipei; Huang Yen-chang, Lee Chih-kai, Lin Guan-yi, Shiao Yu-jan, Yeh Cheng

The men's artistic team competition at the 2022 Asian Games was held on 24 September 2023 at the Huanglong Sports Centre Gymnasium.

== Schedule ==
All times are China Standard Time (UTC+08:00)

Date	Time	Event
Sunday, 24 September 2023	10:00	Final

== Results ==
Legend

- DNF — Did not finish
- DNS — Did not start

Rank	Team	Floor (gymnastics)	Pommel horse	Rings (gymnastics)	Vault (gymnastics)	Parallel bars	Horizontal bar	Total
1st place, gold medalist(s)	China (CHN)	42.165	42.065	44.466	44.099	46.232	42.998	262.025
	Lan Xingyu	~~12.433~~	~~12.000~~	14.966	14.400	~~14.000~~	~~13.366~~	
	Lin Chaopan	13.966	13.266		~~DNS~~	14.833	14.466	
	Xiao Ruoteng	13.266	14.466	~~DNS~~	14.833		14.266	
	Zhang Boheng	14.933	14.333	14.700	14.866	15.466	14.266	
	Zou Jingyuan			14.800		15.933		
2nd place, silver medalist(s)	Japan (JPN)	42.632	42.166	41.499	44.433	44.899	42.999	258.628
	Shohei Kawakami	14.466	14.000	~~13.100~~	~~14.100~~	~~14.533~~	14.233	
	Takeru Kitazono	~~13.800~~	13.266	13.666	14.600	15.133	~~12.766~~	
	Kakeru Tanigawa	14.033	~~12.166~~			14.900	14.533	
	Wataru Tanigawa	14.133		14.433	15.233	14.866	14.233	
	Ryota Tsumura		14.900	13.400	14.600			
3rd place, bronze medalist(s)	Chinese Taipei (TPE)	40.532	43.999	40.432	42.399	39.799	37.599	244.760
	Huang Yen-chang	13.533	13.933		14.366	13.566	13.233	
	Lee Chih-kai		15.066	13.066		13.733	12.433	
	Lin Guan-yi	13.533		14.466	~~13.633~~	~~10.800~~	~~11.666~~	
	Shiao Yu-jan		15.000	~~12.500~~	13.833			
	Yeh Cheng	13.466	~~13.266~~	12.900	14.200	12.500	11.933	
4	South Korea (KOR)	41.466	40.633	38.365	42.465	42.066	39.500	244.495
	Bae Ga-ram	~~12.233~~	13.400	12.466	14.033	14.133	13.400	
	Jeon Yo-seop		14.033	12.766		13.800	12.800	
	Kim Han-sol	14.433	~~12.800~~	~~DNS~~	~~13.200~~	~~13.766~~	~~DNS~~	
	Shin Jea-hwan	13.500			14.466			
	Yun Jin-seong	13.533	13.200	13.133	13.966	14.133	13.300	
5	Uzbekistan (UZB)	40.632	37.833	38.232	42.066	38.999	36.699	234.461
	Asadbek Azamov	13.266	~~6.066~~	13.166	14.133	12.866	12.266	
	Khumoyun Islomov	13.900	11.500		14.200			
	Ravshan Kamiljanov	13.466	13.633	~~11.033~~	~~13.300~~	12.800	12.133	
	Rustambek Nematov	~~12.666~~		11.700	13.733	~~12.333~~	12.300	
	Akhrorkhon Temirkhonov		12.700	13.366		13.333	~~11.233~~	
6	Kazakhstan (KAZ)	37.733	38.732	36.799	42.032	38.632	35.699	229.627
	Emil Akhmejanov	~~2.100~~	~~11.433~~	12.200	14.266	12.933	12.600	
	Nariman Kurbanov		14.566					
	Roman Mamenov	11.433	12.400	12.433	13.900	13.433	11.833	
	Assan Salimov	13.300		~~10.633~~	13.866	12.266	~~11.266~~	
	Alisher Toibazarov	13.000	11.766	12.166	~~13.766~~	~~11.933~~	11.266	
7	Thailand (THA)	38.700	29.633	36.266	41.799	36.266	34.698	217.362
	Suphacheep Baobenmad	11.600	10.000	11.766	13.900	12.266	11.766	
	Weerapat Chuaisom		10.033			12.300	12.466	
	Ittirit Kumsiriratn	12.700	9.600	~~11.666~~	13.566	~~11.466~~	~~7.366~~	
	Witsawayot Saroj	~~11.400~~	~~3.500~~	11.700	~~0.000~~	11.700	10.466	
	Tikumporn Surintornta	14.400		12.800	14.333			
8	Vietnam (VIE)	37.465	27.333	36.198	41.266	37.065	33.199	212.526
	Đặng Ngọc Xuân Thiện		14.233					
	Lê Thanh Tùng			12.466	13.033	13.566	12.733	
	Nguyễn Văn Khánh Phong	11.933		14.566			8.466	
	Phạm Phước Hiếu	11.566	7.600	9.166	13.633	12.966	12.000	
	Trịnh Hải Khang	13.966	5.500		14.600	10.533		
9	North Korea (PRK)	25.966	22.699	40.533	34.932	33.999	30.799	188.928
	Jong Ryong-il	2.233	DNS	14.433	10.666	7.200	7.600	
	Pak Song-hyok	11.333	12.333	13.500	10.600	13.366	10.833	
	Ri Wi-chol	12.400	10.366	12.600	13.666	14.433	12.366	
10	Iran (IRI)	26.266	23.399	37.433	40.465	26.399	24.866	178.828
	Mehdi Ahmadkohani	~~DNS~~	~~DNS~~	13.400	~~DNS~~	~~DNS~~	~~DNS~~	
	Mohammad Reza Hamidi	13.033	12.333	11.100	12.733	12.933	12.666	
	Mohammad Reza Khosronejad	13.233	11.066	12.933	12.866	13.466	12.200	
	Mehdi Olfati	DNS	DNS	~~DNS~~	14.866	DNS	DNS	
—	Hong Kong (HKG)	DNS	DNS	14.033	27.332	DNS	DNS	DNF
	Jim Man Hin				12.766			
	Ng Ka Ki				14.566			
	Ng Kiu Chung			14.033				
