= Gymnastics at the 2018 Asian Games – Men's artistic team =

Men's team at the 2018 Asian Games
- Venue: Jakarta International Expo
- Date: 20–22 August 2018
- Competitors: 64 from 13 nations

Medalists
gold medal	China; Deng Shudi, Lin Chaopan, Sun Wei, Xiao Ruoteng, Zou Jingyuan
silver medal	Japan; Kenta Chiba, Tomomasa Hasegawa, Fuya Maeno, Shogo Nonomura, Kakeru Tanigawa
bronze medal	South Korea; Kim Han-sol, Lee Hyeok-jung, Lee Jae-seong, Lee Jun-ho, Park Min-soo

The men's artistic team competition at the 2018 Asian Games was held on 20 and 22 August 2018 at the Jakarta International Expo Hall D2.

== Schedule ==
All times are Western Indonesia Time (UTC+07:00)

Date	Time	Event
Monday, 20 August 2018	13:00	Qualification
Wednesday, 22 August 2018	14:00	Final

== Results ==
Legend

- DNS — Did not start

=== Qualification ===
Rank	Team	Floor (gymnastics)	Pommel horse	Rings (gymnastics)	Vault (gymnastics)	Parallel bars	Horizontal bar	Total
1	China (CHN)	41.550	44.450	43.400	42.600	46.250	43.500	261.750
	Deng Shudi	~~13.150~~		14.700	14.400		~~13.500~~	
	Lin Chaopan	14.050	14.450	~~14.150~~	14.550	15.100	14.450	
	Sun Wei	13.400	15.000	14.500	~~DNS~~	~~14.350~~	14.500	
	Xiao Ruoteng	14.100	~~13.900~~	14.200	13.650	15.150	14.550	
	Zou Jingyuan		15.000			16.000		
2	Japan (JPN)	42.000	42.950	42.650	42.800	44.350	41.900	256.650
	Kenta Chiba	~~12.450~~	14.400	~~13.900~~	13.900	14.650	14.150	
	Tomomasa Hasegawa		14.400				~~12.950~~	
	Fuya Maeno	13.550		14.050	~~13.150~~	~~14.200~~		
	Shogo Nonomura	14.050	14.150	14.600	14.450	14.950	13.750	
	Kakeru Tanigawa	14.400	~~13.250~~	14.000	14.450	14.750	14.000	
3	South Korea (KOR)	41.250	38.700	42.800	41.100	41.550	39.800	245.200
	Kim Han-sol	14.200	12.950	14.050	14.200	~~13.450~~	13.000	
	Lee Hyeok-jung	13.600	11.800			13.550	~~12.100~~	
	Lee Jae-seong	~~12.100~~		14.200	13.500			
	Lee Jun-ho	13.450	~~11.000~~	~~13.500~~	13.400	14.200	14.100	
	Park Min-soo		13.950	14.550	~~13.300~~	13.800	12.700	
4	Chinese Taipei (TPE)	40.350	40.900	42.450	41.550	38.000	39.350	242.600
	Chen Chih-yu			14.650				
	Lee Chih-kai	13.900	15.050	~~13.350~~	14.300	14.000	~~11.300~~	
	Shiao Yu-jan	12.000	13.650		13.600	10.750	12.950	
	Tang Chia-hung	14.450		13.650			14.550	
	Yu Chao-wei	~~11.800~~	12.200	14.150	13.650	13.250	11.850	
5	Vietnam (VIE)	38.550	37.550	41.400	40.550	40.450	39.650	238.150
	Đặng Nam			14.550				
	Đinh Phương Thành	13.200	12.600		12.450	13.750	12.950	
	Đỗ Vũ Hưng	~~DNS~~	~~9.100~~	~~11.400~~	13.450	~~11.950~~		
	Lê Thanh Tùng	12.400	12.350	13.250	14.650	13.500	13.550	
	Phạm Phước Hưng	12.950	12.600	13.600		13.200	13.150	
6	Kazakhstan (KAZ)	39.650	40.850	38.050	41.550	40.350	37.700	238.150
	Ilyas Azizov	~~11.350~~	13.400	13.000	13.500	13.000	~~10.750~~	
	Yerbol Jantykov	12.300	~~11.450~~	11.850	~~12.650~~	13.650	12.350	
	Milad Karimi	14.050			13.950		13.750	
	Nariman Kurbanov		14.050					
	Akim Mussayev	13.300	13.400	13.200	14.100	13.700	11.600	
7	Uzbekistan (UZB)	37.650	36.100	39.200	41.800	39.050	38.300	232.100
	Rasuljon Abdurakhimov	12.300	10.950	13.200	~~13.450~~	13.850	12.850	
	Khusniddin Abdusamatov	~~11.500~~	~~9.950~~			13.100	~~11.750~~	
	Abdulla Azimov	12.450	13.500	~~12.600~~	13.700	~~11.850~~	12.300	
	Anton Fokin		11.650	12.750	13.900	12.100	13.150	
	Akobir Khamrokulov	12.900		13.250	14.200			
8	Iran (IRI)	38.050	38.850	40.300	38.700	37.450	36.950	230.300
	Mehdi Ahmadkohani	~~DNS~~	~~10.400~~	14.100	~~DNS~~	12.400	12.350	
	Saeid Reza Keikha	12.700	14.300	~~DNS~~	12.550	~~DNS~~	~~DNS~~	
	Mohammad Reza Khosronejad	12.850	12.700	13.500	12.600	13.500	12.400	
	Saman Madani	12.500	11.850	12.700	13.550	11.550	12.200	
9	India (IND)	37.500	34.650	39.950	41.350	39.500	37.000	229.950
	Ashish Kumar	13.100	9.900	13.050	14.100	~~12.500~~	11.900	
	Gaurav Kumar	11.950	~~3.250~~	13.000	~~12.850~~	13.200	12.250	
	Rakesh Kumar Patra			13.900		13.300		
	Yogeshwar Singh	12.450	12.150	~~12.650~~	14.150	13.000	~~11.550~~	
	Siddharth Verma	~~11.400~~	12.600		13.100		12.850	
10	Malaysia (MAS)	36.450	36.700	37.950	39.950	37.500	37.700	226.250
	Chau Jern Rong		11.000	13.100		12.250	12.850	
	Azroy Amierol Jaafar	12.500	~~6.850~~	12.600	13.400	12.200	12.200	
	Loo Phay Xing	~~11.250~~	13.350	12.250	14.000	13.050	12.650	
	Tan Fu Jie	12.400	12.350		~~12.200~~			
	Zul Bahrin Mat Asri	11.550		~~12.150~~	12.550	~~11.650~~	~~9.700~~	
11	Indonesia (INA)	36.500	35.650	38.500	42.200	37.750	35.100	225.700
	Agung Suci Tantio Akbar	12.700	12.550	11.650	13.850	12.800	11.300	
	Muhammad Aprizal		10.700	~~DNS~~	~~13.100~~	~~DNS~~	~~DNS~~	
	Dwi Samsul Arifin	11.050		14.150	13.750	12.100	11.700	
	Agus Adi Prayoko		~~8.300~~	12.700	14.600			
	Muhammad Try Saputra	12.750	12.400			12.850	12.100	
12	North Korea (PRK)	32.950	32.550	41.550	41.550	38.400	36.350	223.350
	Han Jong-hyok	11.000	9.350	13.700		14.850	13.550	
	Jong Ryong-il	9.750		14.850	13.500	10.700	11.300	
	Ri Kwang-mo		12.650					
	Ri Se-gwang		~~DNS~~		14.200			
	Ri Yong-min	12.200	10.550	13.000	13.850	12.850	11.500	
13	Thailand (THA)	33.100	32.400	37.350	27.300	37.800	34.550	202.500
	Nattipong Aeadwong		11.550	11.800	14.350	12.650	11.300	
	Anawin Phothong	10.950	10.950	12.700		~~10.850~~		
	Jamorn Prommanee	~~9.900~~	9.900			13.050	11.050	
	Tikumporn Surintornta	10.350		12.850	12.950		12.200	
	Tissanupan Wichianpradit	11.800		~~11.250~~	0.000	12.100	~~9.700~~	

=== Final ===
Rank	Team	Floor (gymnastics)	Pommel horse	Rings (gymnastics)	Vault (gymnastics)	Parallel bars	Horizontal bar	Total
1st place, gold medalist(s)	China (CHN)	41.050	44.250	42.850	44.100	45.800	42.900	260.950
	Deng Shudi	13.950		14.500	14.450	14.600		
	Lin Chaopan	13.200			14.700	15.100	14.050	
	Sun Wei		15.150	14.050			14.550	
	Xiao Ruoteng	13.900	14.350	14.300	14.950		14.300	
	Zou Jingyuan		14.750			16.100		
2nd place, silver medalist(s)	Japan (JPN)	42.150	40.100	43.250	43.000	42.150	37.900	248.550
	Kenta Chiba		14.150	14.300		14.350	13.900	
	Tomomasa Hasegawa		12.500				12.200	
	Fuya Maeno	14.150		14.350	14.350		11.800	
	Shogo Nonomura	14.050		14.600	14.200	13.300		
	Kakeru Tanigawa	13.950	13.450		14.450	14.500		
3rd place, bronze medalist(s)	South Korea (KOR)	40.650	39.900	42.050	41.250	41.600	41.950	247.400
	Kim Han-sol	13.650	12.350	13.800	13.700	13.700		
	Lee Hyeok-jung	13.850	13.750				13.600	
	Lee Jae-seong			14.100	14.000			
	Lee Jun-ho	13.150			13.550	14.200	14.100	
	Park Min-soo		13.800	14.150		13.700	14.250	
4	Chinese Taipei (TPE)	40.450	39.700	42.000	40.750	37.950	39.450	240.300
	Chen Chih-yu			14.300		11.650		
	Lee Chih-kai	14.050	15.100		14.250	13.750	11.950	
	Shiao Yu-jan	13.150	14.050		13.900		12.800	
	Tang Chia-hung	13.250		13.950			14.700	
	Yu Chao-wei		10.550	13.750	12.600	12.550		
5	Vietnam (VIE)	35.550	36.700	40.550	40.850	41.150	39.950	234.750
	Đặng Nam			14.150				
	Đinh Phương Thành	13.450	13.350		12.400	13.400	13.650	
	Đỗ Vũ Hưng				13.650			
	Lê Thanh Tùng	10.850	11.050	13.150	14.800	14.100	13.350	
	Phạm Phước Hưng	11.250	12.300	13.250		13.650	12.950	
6	Kazakhstan (KAZ)	38.100	39.550	38.150	39.950	39.100	39.450	234.300
	Ilyas Azizov	11.800	13.150	12.550	13.550	13.200		
	Yerbol Jantykov			12.750		12.450	14.100	
	Milad Karimi	13.000			12.350		14.250	
	Nariman Kurbanov		14.400					
	Akim Mussayev	13.300	12.000	12.850	14.050	13.450	11.100	
7	Uzbekistan (UZB)	35.850	38.950	38.300	41.250	37.600	37.050	229.000
	Rasuljon Abdurakhimov	11.400	11.600	12.100		12.750	12.550	
	Khusniddin Abdusamatov	12.700				10.950	11.400	
	Abdulla Azimov		14.200		13.550			
	Anton Fokin		13.150	13.450	13.800	13.900	13.100	
	Akobir Khamrokulov	11.750		12.750	13.900			
8	Iran (IRI)	24.850	36.250	26.300	25.300	26.700	24.850	164.250
	Mehdi Ahmadkohani	DNS	10.650	13.200	DNS	13.300	12.450	
	Saeid Reza Keikha	12.350	14.350	DNS	12.750	DNS	DNS	
	Mohammad Reza Khosronejad	12.500	11.250	13.100	12.550	13.400	12.400	
	Saman Madani							
