= Tang Chia-hung =

Taiwenese artistic gymnast (born 1996)

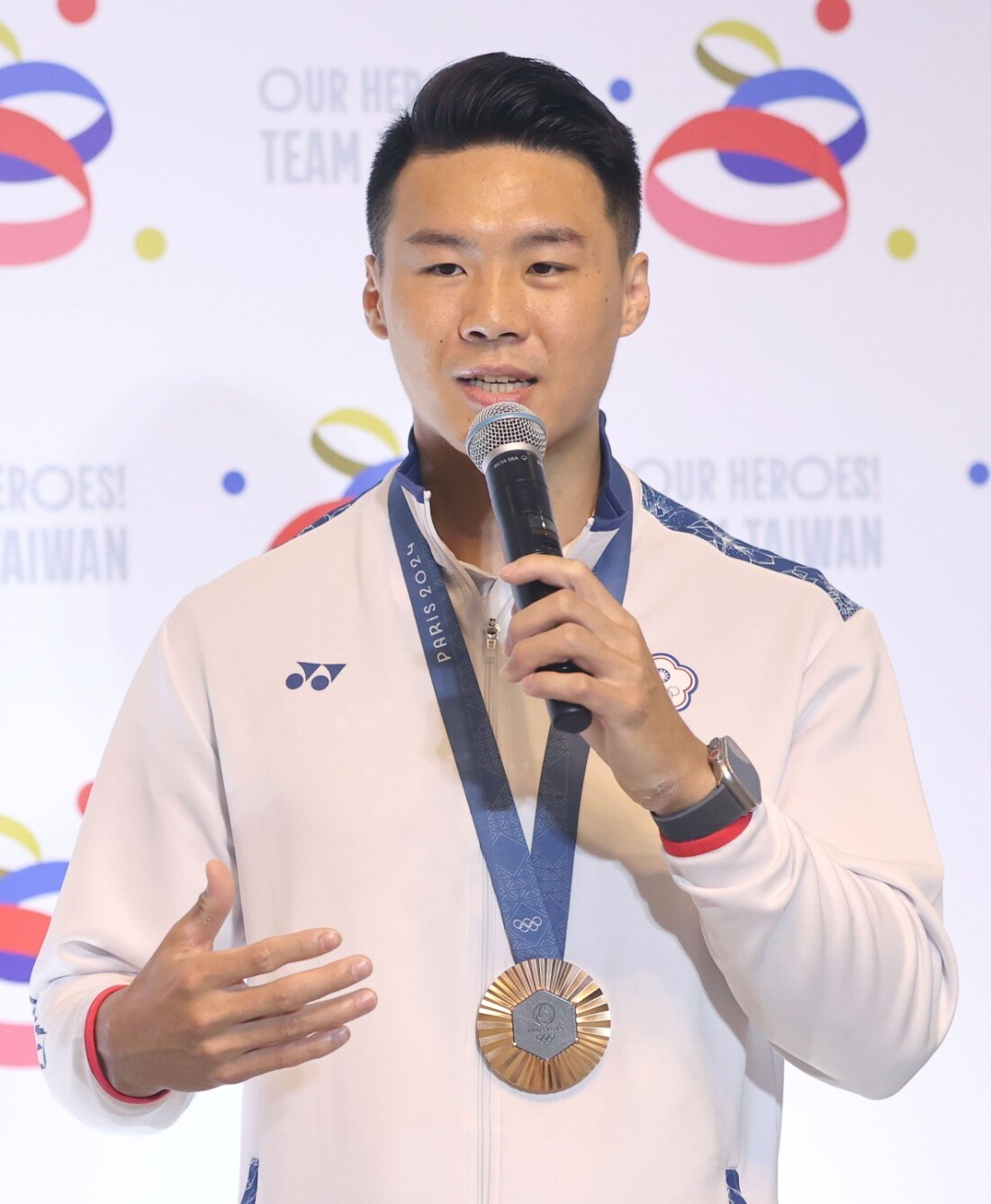
- Tang in 2024

Personal information
- Born: 23 September 1996 (age 30) Taipei, Taiwan
- Height: 174 cm (5 ft 9 in)

Gymnastics career
- Discipline: Men's artistic gymnastics
- Country represented: Chinese Taipei
- Club: Taiwan Normal University
- Head coach: Weng Shih-hang
Medal record
Men's artistic gymnastics
Representing Chinese Taipei
Olympic Games
| Bronze medal – third place | 2024 Paris | Horizontal bar |
World Championships
| Gold medal – first place | 2026 Rotterdam | Horizontal bar |
Asian Games
| Gold medal – first place | 2018 Jakarta | Horizontal bar |
| Silver medal – second place | 2018 Jakarta | Floor exercise |
| Bronze medal – third place | 2026 Aichi-Nagoya | Team |
Asian Championships
| Gold medal – first place | 2025 Jecheon | Horizontal bar |
| Gold medal – first place | 2026 Zunyi | Horizontal bar |
| Silver medal – second place | 2019 Ulaanbaatar | Horizontal bar |
| Bronze medal – third place | 2019 Ulaanbaatar | Team |
| Bronze medal – third place | 2022 Doha | Team |
Summer Universiade
| Gold medal – first place | 2019 Naples | Horizontal bar |
| Silver medal – second place | 2019 Naples | Team |

Tang Chia-hung (Chinese: 唐嘉鴻; pinyin: Táng Jiāhóng; born 23 September 1996) is a Taiwanese artistic gymnast. He won the gold medal on the horizontal bar and the silver medal on the floor exercise at the 2018 Asian Games. He is the 2019 Summer Universiade horizontal bar champion. He competed at the 2020 Summer Olympics and he won the bronze medal at the 2024 Summer Olympics on the horizontal bar.

== Early life ==
Tang was diagnosed with mild attention deficit hyperactivity disorder in kindergarten, and his parents enrolled him in gymnastics after a doctor suggested it to burn off energy. He was inspired by the 2004 documentary Jump! Boys that featured Taiwanese gymnasts including future teammate Lee Chih-kai.

== Career ==
=== 2013–14 ===
Tang won the bronze medal on the floor exercise at the 2013 Gymnasiade behind Giarnni Regini-Moran and Botond Kardos. He was selected to represent Chinese Taipei at the 2014 Asian Games and finished sixth with the team. However, he injured his Achilles tendon before the competition and did not actually compete.

=== 2017–18 ===
Tang won a gold medal on the floor exercise at the 2017 Doha World Cup. He finished in fourth place on the floor exercise at the 2017 Summer Universiade held in Taipei, due to going out of bounds. He missed the rest of the season due to an elbow injury the required three surgeries.

Tang returned to competition at the 2018 Asian Games, helping the Chinese Taipei team place fourth. Individually, he won the silver medal on the floor exercise behind South Korea's Kim Han-sol. The next day, he won the gold medal in the horizontal bar final. He then competed at the 2018 World Championships and qualified for the horizontal bar final where he finished in fifth place.

=== 2019 ===
Tang competed at the 2019 Asian Championships despite an injured foot and won a bronze medal with the Chinese Taipei team. Individually, he won the silver medal on the horizontal bar behind China's Hu Xuwei. At the 2019 Summer Universiade, he won the gold medal on the horizontal bar. He also won the silver medal in the team event with Hsu Ping-chien and Lee Chih-kai. Then at the Paris World Challenge Cup, he won the bronze medal on the horizontal bar. At the 2019 World Championships, Tang and the Chinese Taipei team placed eighth in the qualification round and qualified a team for the Olympic Games for the first time since 1964. The team also qualified for its first-ever team final, and they finished sixth.

=== 2020–21 ===
Tang was scheduled to compete at both the 2020 Stuttgart and Birmingham World Cups. However, both of these events were postponed to 2021 and eventually canceled due to the COVID-19 pandemic. Tang was selected to represent Chinese Taipei at the 2020 Summer Olympics. The team of Tang, Hung Yuan-hsi, Shiao Yu-jan, and Lee Chih-kai finished 10th in the qualification round, making them the second reserve for the team final. In the all-around final, he finished in seventh place, which is the best-ever result for a Chinese Taipei athlete in the individual all-around.

=== 2022–23 ===
At the 2022 Asian Championships, Tang won the bronze medal with the Chinese Taipei team, and he placed fourth in the all-around. He also finished sixth in the pommel horse final and eighth in the floor exercise and horizontal bar finals. Then at the Paris World Challenge Cup, he won the silver medal on the floor exercise. He then won the floor exercise bronze medal at the Mersin World Challenge Cup. He was the overall floor exercise winner of the 2022 World Challenge Cup series. He qualified for the all-around final at the World Championships and finished ninth.

Tang tore his Achilles tendon at the beginning of 2023. He returned to competition at the 2023 Paris World Challenge and won the horizontal bar gold medal.

=== 2024 ===
Tang competed in the 2024 World Cup series to earn points for Olympic qualification. He won the horizontal bar gold medals at the events in Cairo, Cottbus, and Doha, securing enough points to qualify for the 2024 Summer Olympics. He was the overall horizontal bar winner of the World Cup series. He also competed in the World Challenge Cup series, winning the gold medal on the horizontal bar at the event in Osijek. He then won the silver medal at the event in Varna and the gold medal at the event in Koper.
