= Gymnastics at the 2026 Asian Games – Men's artistic team all-around =

Men's team at the 2026 Asian Games
- Venue: Nippon Gaishi Hall Rainbow Hall
- Date: 21 September 2026 (qualification); 23 September 2026 (final)
- Nations: 8

Medalists
gold medal	China; Lan Xingyu; Sun Wei; Tian Hao; Zhang Boheng; Zou Jingyuan
silver medal	Japan; Daiki Hashimoto; Kiichi Kaneta; Shinnosuke Oka; Shoma Tsukiyama; Tomoharu Tsunogai
bronze medal	Chinese Taipei; Chuang Chia-lung; Hung Yuan-hsi; Lee Chih-kai; Shiao Yu-jan; Tang Chia-hung

The men's artistic team competition at the 2026 Asian Games was held on 23 September 2026 at the Nippon Gaishi Hall Rainbow Hall. China, the defending champions, won the gold. It was China's third straight Asian Games gold in the event.

== Schedule ==
All times are Japan Standard Time (UTC+09:00)

Date	Time	Event
Monday, 21 September 2026	10:00	Qualification
Wednesday, 23 September 2026	13:00	Final

== Qualification ==
Rank	Team	Floor (gymnastics)	Pommel horse	Rings (gymnastics)	Vault (gymnastics)	Parallel bars	Horizontal bar	Total	Qual.
1	China (CHN)	39.966	42.566	43.699	42.432	44.299	42.399	255.361	Q
1	Lan Xingyu	12.266		15.200	14.133	14.266	12.400	255.361	Q
1	Zou Jingyuan		14.200	14.266		15.133		255.361	Q
1	Sun Wei	13.900	14.200	13.766	14.166	13.333	13.933	255.361	Q
1	Tian Hao	12.233	13.900				14.433	255.361	Q
1	Zhang Boheng	13.800	14.166	14.233	14.133	14.700	14.033	255.361	Q
2	Japan (JPN)	41.432	42.532	42.333	42.065	43.566	42.532	254.460	Q
2	Tomoharu Tsunogai		12.833			14.633	13.433	254.460	Q
2	Shoma Tsukiyama	14.166	14.266	12.733	13.966	12.500	14.266	254.460	Q
2	Kiichi Kaneta			14.600				254.460	Q
2	Shinnosuke Oka	13.833	13.766	14.000	14.233	14.633	14.233	254.460	Q
2	Daiki Hashimoto	13.433	14.500	13.733	13.866	14.300	14.033	254.460	Q
3	South Korea (KOR)	40.765	40.733	39.399	39.532	39.799	38.099	238.327	Q
3	Hur Woong		13.833			12.700		238.327	Q
3	Seo Jung-won				12.333			238.327	Q
3	Ryu Sung-hyun	14.566	12.900	13.066	12.733		13.533	238.327	Q
3	Lee Jung-hyo	12.433	14.000	13.600	12.266	13.433	11.766	238.327	Q
3	Kim Jae-ho	13.766	11.766	12.733	14.466	13.666	12.800	238.327	Q
4	Kazakhstan (KAZ)	39.566	40.100	39.499	41.866	39.866	36.932	237.829	Q
4	Nariman Kurbanov		14.200					237.829	Q
4	Milad Karimi	13.833	13.000			13.333	13.133	237.829	Q
4	Dmitriy Patanin	13.133		13.300	13.900	12.200	11.066	237.829	Q
4	Nurtan Idrissov	12.600	11.200	13.266	13.866	13.300	12.733	237.829	Q
4	Ilyas Azizov	12.500	12.900	12.933	14.100	13.233	9.333	237.829	Q
5	Chinese Taipei (TPE)	38.199	42.166	37.732	40.266	38.932	38.632	235.927	Q
5	Tang Chia-hung	12.733		13.866	12.466		14.166	235.927	Q
5	Hung Yuan-hsi	12.300	13.066	12.466	13.500	12.833	11.200	235.927	Q
5	Chuang Chia-lung	12.966	13.400	11.100	13.500	12.466	11.666	235.927	Q
5	Lee Chih-kai		14.433			13.633	12.800	235.927	Q
5	Shiao Yu-jan	12.500	14.333	11.400	13.266	11.800		235.927	Q
6	Philippines (PHI)	41.699	34.265	37.599	41.032	38.232	38.266	232.093	Q
6	Justine Ace de Leon	13.066		12.433	13.666			232.093	Q
6	Eldrew Yulo	13.966	11.733	11.666	14.300	12.166	13.433	232.093	Q
6	Zachary Nuñez		13.566			11.800	12.233	232.093	Q
6	Miguel Besana	13.133	8.966	10.900	14.066	11.233	12.600	232.093	Q
6	Carlos Yulo	14.600	8.233	13.500	13.166	14.266	11.700	232.093	Q
7	Vietnam (VIE)	34.065	37.133	36.032	37.466	36.532	34.732	255.361	Q
7	Đặng Ngọc Xuân Thiện		14.300					255.361	Q
7	Trần Đình Vương	11.366	12.733	11.866	12.400	13.133	12.233	255.361	Q
7	Nguyễn Văn Khánh Phong			13.833			10.366	255.361	Q
7	Trịnh Hải Khang	12.233			13.366	11.533		255.361	Q
7	Độ Nam Anh	10.466	10.100	10.333	11.700	11.866	12.133	255.361	Q
8	Singapore (SGP)	33.166	32.799	32.433	37.032	34.332	34.132	203.894	Q
8	Abdulattif Abdul Barr				12.333	11.133	10.866	203.894	Q
8	Kenzu Kang	11.266	11.566	10.100				203.894	Q
8	Alfonso Tan You An	10.600	9.833	10.733	11.433	10.333	10.766	203.894	Q
8	Cameron Cole Pefianco	10.566	9.466	11.600	11.966	11.466	11.500	203.894	Q
8	Asher Pua	11.300	11.400	10.066	12.733	11.733	11.766	203.894	Q

== Final ==
Rank	Team	Floor (gymnastics)	Pommel horse	Rings (gymnastics)	Vault (gymnastics)	Parallel bars	Horizontal bar	Total
1st place, gold medalist(s)	China (CHN)	41.365	41.433	44.099	43.399	43.699	41.100	255.095
1st place, gold medalist(s)	Lan Xingyu			15.200	14.266	14.133		255.095
1st place, gold medalist(s)	Zou Jingyuan			14.233		15.400		255.095
1st place, gold medalist(s)	Sun Wei	13.566	14.000		14.400		12.500	255.095
1st place, gold medalist(s)	Tian Hao	13.966	14.000				14.400	255.095
1st place, gold medalist(s)	Zhang Boheng	13.833	13.433	14.666	14.733	14.166	14.200	255.095
2nd place, silver medalist(s)	Japan (JPN)	41.699	41.265	43.066	42.899	43.132	41.765	253.826
2nd place, silver medalist(s)	Tomoharu Tsunogai					14.200	13.766	253.826
2nd place, silver medalist(s)	Shoma Tsukiyama	13.966	14.266		14.400			253.826
2nd place, silver medalist(s)	Kiichi Kaneta			14.900				253.826
2nd place, silver medalist(s)	Shinnosuke Oka	13.733	12.533	14.233	13.666	14.566	12.766	253.826
2nd place, silver medalist(s)	Daiki Hashimoto	14.000	14.466	13.933	14.833	14.366	15.233	253.826
3rd place, bronze medalist(s)	Chinese Taipei (TPE)	39.532	40.166	38.966	40.233	39.733	41.266	239.896
3rd place, bronze medalist(s)	Tang Chia-hung	13.633		13.800	14.000		15.033	239.896
3rd place, bronze medalist(s)	Hung Yuan-hsi	12.566		12.833	12.833	13.800		239.896
3rd place, bronze medalist(s)	Chuang Chia-lung	13.333	12.733	12.333	13.400	12.833	13.200	239.896
3rd place, bronze medalist(s)	Lee Chih-kai		14.033			13.100	13.033	239.896
3rd place, bronze medalist(s)	Shiao Yu-jan		13.400					239.896
4	Kazakhstan (KAZ)	41.199	39.233	37.665	41.733	39.100	38.666	237.596
4	Nariman Kurbanov		13.433					237.596
4	Milad Karimi	13.766	12.400				12.833	237.596
4	Dmitriy Patanin	13.933		12.933	13.900	13.400		237.596
4	Nurtan Idrissov			13.166	13.900	12.400	12.800	237.596
4	Ilyas Azizov	13.500	13.400	11.566	13.933	13.300	13.033	237.596
5	South Korea (KOR)	38.565	40.265	38.299	42.000	36.698	40.532	236.359
5	Hur Woong		13.666			10.866		236.359
5	Seo Jung-won							236.359
5	Ryu Sung-hyun	12.666	13.566	13.033	14.600		13.466	236.359
5	Lee Jung-hyo	12.366	13.033	12.633	13.100	12.366	13.000	236.359
5	Kim Jae-ho	13.533		12.633	14.300	13.466	14.066	236.359
6	Philippines (PHI)	38.199	35.632	38.099	42.365	36.099	36.965	227.359
6	Justine Ace de Leon	10.933		12.533	13.833			227.359
6	Eldrew Yulo	13.000	11.366	12.233	13.966	11.933	13.166	227.359
6	Zachary Nuñez		12.333				12.066	227.359
6	Miguel Besana		11.933			10.000	11.733	227.359
6	Carlos Yulo	14.266		13.333	14.566	14.166		227.359
7	Vietnam (VIE)	33.565	39.299	36.499	35.999	35.033	34.033	214.428
7	Đặng Ngọc Xuân Thiện		14.500					214.428
7	Trần Đình Vương	10.966	12.666	11.766	11.900	11.533	12.200	214.428
7	Nguyễn Văn Khánh Phong			13.800			10.633	214.428
7	Trịnh Hải Khang	11.933			12.266	11.400		214.428
7	Độ Nam Anh	10.666	12.133	10.933	11.833	12.100	11.200	214.428
8	Singapore (SGP)	32.299	35.199	33.266	37.066	32.199	30.899	200.928
8	Abdulattif Abdul Barr					9.933	10.833	200.928
8	Kenzu Kang		11.633					200.928
8	Alfonso Tan You An	11.033	11.266	10.500	12.033	11.266		200.928
8	Cameron Cole Pefianco	10.000		11.466	12.100	11.000	11.266	200.928
8	Asher Pua	11.266	12.300	11.300	12.933		8.800	200.928
