= Yu Chao-wei =

Taiwanese artistic gymnast

- Born: 22 October 1993 (age 32)

Gymnastics career
- Discipline: Men's artistic gymnastics
- Country represented: Chinese Taipei
- Club: Taiwan University of Sport
- Head coach: Lin Yuxin

Yu Chao-wei (born 22 October 1993) is a Taiwanese artistic gymnast. He has competed at the World Artistic Gymnastics Championships five times. He helped Chinese Taipei qualify a full team to the 2020 Summer Olympics, but he was unable to compete due to an ACL injury.

== Career ==
Yu began gymnastics at the age of eight. He competed at his first World Championships in 2011 and finished 140th in the all-around qualification round.

Yu helped Chinese Taipei finish 23rd in the team qualifications at the 2015 World Championships. He represented Chinese Taipei at the 2017 Summer Universiade and helped the team finish fifth. He qualified for the rings final and finished eighth. He competed on the floor exercise, still rings, vault, and parallel bars at the 2017 World Championships but did not advance into any finals.

Yu represented Chinese Taipei at the 2018 Asian Games, where the team finished fourth. Individually, Yu competed in the all-around and finished 13th. He competed with the Chinese Taipei team that placed 17th in the team qualifications at the 2018 World Championships.

Yu was a member of the team that qualified for the 2020 Olympic Games at the 2019 World Championships, and they qualified to the team final for the first time. In the team final, the Chinese Taipei team finished sixth, with Yu contributing on the still rings and the parallel bars.

Yu was initially selected to represent Chinese Taipei at the 2020 Summer Olympics alongside Lee Chih-kai, Shiao Yu-jan, and Tang Chia-hung. However, he tore his ACL during training in July, and he was replaced by Hung Yuan-hsi.
