= Xiao Ruoteng =

Chinese artistic gymnast

- 肖若腾
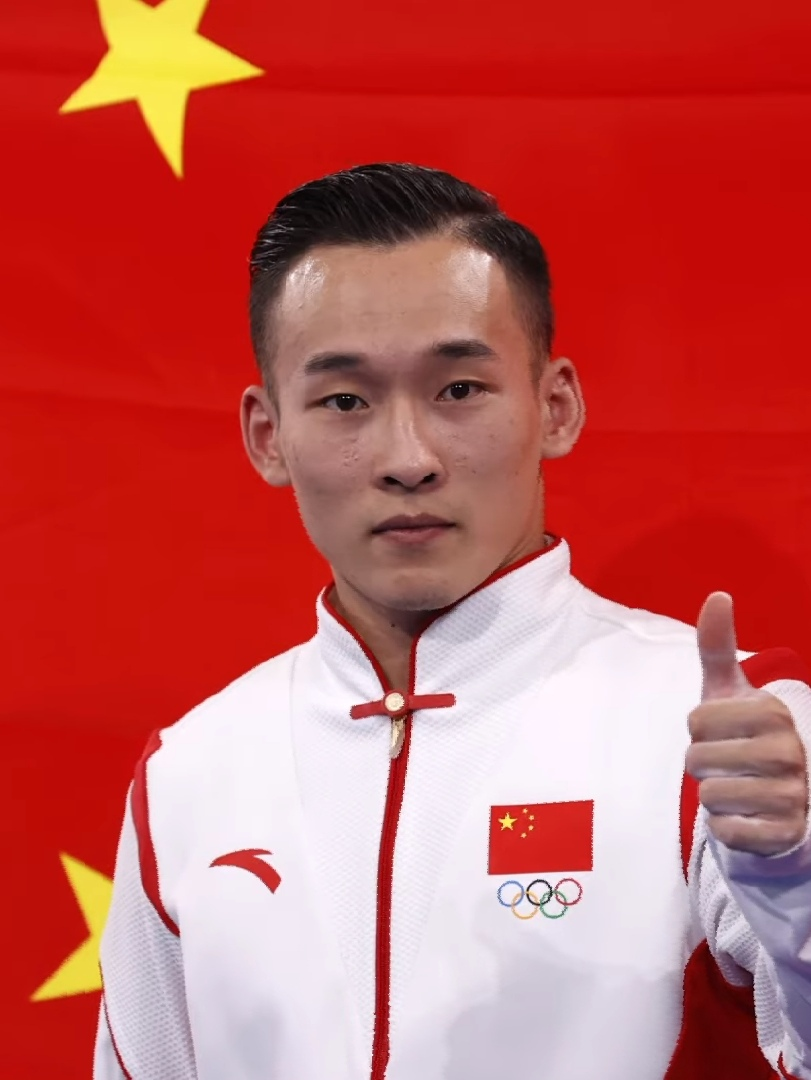
- Xiao in 2021

Personal information
- Born: 30 January 1996 (age 30) Beijing, China

Gymnastics career
- Discipline: Men's artistic gymnastics
- Country represented: China
- Club: Beijing
- Head coaches: Wang Hongwei; Teng Haibin
Medal record
Representing China
Olympic Games
Silver medal – second place	2020 Tokyo	All-around
Silver medal – second place	2024 Paris	Team
Bronze medal – third place	2020 Tokyo	Team
Bronze medal – third place	2020 Tokyo	Floor exercise
Bronze medal – third place	2024 Paris	All-around
World Championships
Gold medal – first place	2017 Montreal	All-around
Gold medal – first place	2018 Doha	Team
Gold medal – first place	2018 Doha	Pommel horse
Silver medal – second place	2018 Doha	All-around
Silver medal – second place	2019 Stuttgart	Team
Bronze medal – third place	2015 Glasgow	Team
Bronze medal – third place	2017 Montreal	Pommel horse
Bronze medal – third place	2019 Stuttgart	Floor exercise
Asian Games
Gold medal – first place	2018 Jakarta	Team
Gold medal – first place	2022 Hangzhou	Team
Silver medal – second place	2018 Jakarta	Parallel bars
Bronze medal – third place	2018 Jakarta	All-around
Bronze medal – third place	2018 Jakarta	Horizontal bar
Asian Championships
Gold medal – first place	2017 Bangkok	Team
Gold medal – first place	2017 Bangkok	All-around
Gold medal – first place	2017 Bangkok	Pommel horse
Silver medal – second place	2015 Hiroshima	Team
Silver medal – second place	2015 Hiroshima	Pommel horse
Silver medal – second place	2017 Bangkok	Floor exercise
Silver medal – second place	2017 Bangkok	Horizontal bar
National Games
Gold medal – first place	2021 Shaanxi	All-Around
Gold medal – first place	2025 Guangdong	All-Around
Bronze medal – third place	2017 Tianjin	Pommel Horse
Bronze medal – third place	2025 Guangdong	Horizontal Bar

Xiao Ruoteng (simplified Chinese: 肖若腾; traditional Chinese: 肖若騰; pinyin: Xiào Ruòténg, born 30 January 1996) is a Chinese artistic gymnast. He competed at the 2020 and 2024 Olympic Games, winning five medals. He is the 2017 World all-around champion and the 2018 World pommel horse champion. As a member of the Chinese team, he is a 2018 World champion and a two-time Asian Games champion (2018, 2022). He is also the 2017 Asian all-around and pommel horse champion.

== Early life ==
Xiao was born on 30 January 1996 in Beijing. His parents signed him up for gymnastics at age five because he was an active child.

== Gymnastics career ==
=== 2015–16 ===
Xiao won gold medals on the pommel horse and the horizontal bar at the 2015 São Paulo World Cup. He then competed at the Asian Championships in Hiroshima and helped the Chinese team win silver behind Japan. Individually, he won a silver medal on the pommel horse behind Kazuma Kaya. He was then selected to compete at the World Championships in Glasgow alongside Deng Shudi, Lin Chaopan, Liu Yang, You Hao, and Zhang Chenglong. The team won the bronze medal behind Japan and Great Britain after Xiao fell off the pommel horse. This marked the first time since 2003 that the Chinese team did not win the gold medal at the World Championships. Xiao qualified for the individual all-around final, where he finished in ninth place.

Xiao injured his elbow during training and was unable to compete in the 2016 Olympic Games. He considered retirement due to the injury but decided to continue competing.

=== 2017 ===
Xiao returned to competition and won the gold medal on the horizontal bar at the Doha World Cup, and he won a silver medal on the pommel horse behind Krisztián Berki. He then competed at the Asian Championships in Bangkok and led his team to the gold medal. He also won the gold medal in the all-around and on the pommel horse, and he won silver medals on the floor exercise and horizontal bar. He then competed at the World Championships in Montreal and won the all-around title. He became the first Chinese gymnast to win a major all-around title since Yang Wei won at the 2008 Summer Olympics. He also won a bronze medal in the pommel horse final behind Max Whitlock and David Belyavskiy.

=== 2018 ===
Xiao won a silver medal on the parallel bars at the Doha World Cup behind teammate Zou Jingyuan. He then competed at the Chinese Championships and won the all-around title by over two points ahead of Sun Wei. He also won a bronze medal with his provincial team and on the horizontal bar. He represented China at the 2018 Asian Games alongside Zou, Sun, Deng Shudi, and Lin Chaopan, and they won the team title. Individually, he won the all-around bronze medal behind Lin and Shogo Nonomura after falling off the pommel horse. Then in the event finals, he won a silver medal on the parallel bars and a bronze medal on the horizontal bar.

Xiao was selected to compete at the World Championships in Doha with the same team that competed at the Asian Games. The team finished second to Russia in the qualification round due to multiple falls on the pommel horse, and Xiao qualified in first place for the all-around final. The team defeated Russia by only 0.049 in the team final to win China's first World team gold medal since 2014. In the all-around final Xiao and Artur Dalaloyan tied with the highest score of 87.598. However, the tie-breaker procedure of counting the five highest apparatus scores resulted in Dalaloyan winning the gold medal. Then in the pommel horse final, he tied with Max Whitlock for the highest score, but Xiao won the highest execution score tie-breaker.

=== 2019–20 ===
Xiao finished seventh on the floor exercise at the 2019 Doha World Cup. Then at the Chinese Championships, he won the gold medal on the floor exercise and the silver medal on the pommel horse. He then competed at the World Championships in Stuttgart alongside Deng Shudi, Lin Chaopan, Sun Wei, and Zou Jingyuan. The team trailed Russia in the qualification round, and Xiao qualified third into the all-around final behind Russians Nikita Nagornyy and Artur Dalaloyan. The Chinese team won the silver medal in the team final by one point behind Russia. In the all-around final, Xiao fell off the horizontal bar, resulting in a fourth-place finish by 0.283 behind the bronze medalist. He then won a bronze medal in the floor exercise final behind Carlos Yulo and Artem Dolgopyat.

Xiao was scheduled to compete at the 2020 Tokyo World Cup. However, the event was canceled due to the coronavirus pandemic in Japan. In October 2020, he competed at the Chinese Championships and finished second in the all-around to Sun Wei. He also won a silver medal on the pommel horse behind Zou Jingyuan.

=== 2021–22 ===
Xiao won the all-around title at the Chinese Championships, and he placed seventh on the floor exercise and fourth on the pommel horse. He was one of the 12 men selected for the Olympic training squad. At the Olympic Trials, he did not compete in the all-around, but he posted the highest score on the floor exercise and the second-highest score on the vault. He was selected to represent China at the 2020 Summer Olympics alongside Lin Chaopan, Sun Wei, and Zou Jingyuan. The team qualified for the team final in second place behind Japan, and Xiao qualified for the all-around in third place. The team then won the bronze medal in the final behind the Russian Olympic Committee and Japan. Then in the all-around final, he won the silver medal by 0.400 behind Japan's Daiki Hashimoto. Some Chinese fans questioned the results, specifically Hashimoto's vault score, and attacked Hashimoto on social media. The International Gymnastics Federation released a statement explaining the score and confirming the results. He then won a bronze medal in the floor exercise final behind Artem Dolgopyat and Rayderley Zapata.

After the Olympic Games, Xiao competed at the National Games of China and won the all-around title. At the 2022 Chinese Championships, he only competed on the pommel horse and parallel bars, finishing sixth in the pommel horse final. He was not selected to compete at the 2022 World Championships.

=== 2023 ===
Xiao competed on the floor exercise and horizontal bar at the Doha World Cup but did not qualify for either event final. Then at the Chinese Championships, he finished fifth in the all-around. He then competed at the Asian Games in Hangzhou alongside Lan Xingyu, Zou Jingyuan, Lin Chaopan, and Zhang Boheng, and they won the team title ahead of Japan. Individually, Xiao placed seventh in the pommel horse final. Because the Asian Games took place around the same time as the World Championships, Xiao did not compete at Worlds.

=== 2024 ===
Xiao began the Olympic season at the Baku World Cup, finishing sixth on the horizontal bar. Then at the Chinese Championships, he won the silver medal in the all-around and bronze medals on the floor exercise and horizontal bar. He was selected to compete at the China at the 2024 Summer Olympics alongside Liu Yang, Su Weide, Zhang Boheng, and Zou Jingyuan. The team qualified first for the team final, and Xiao qualified in fourth place for the all-around and horizontal bar finals. However, in the team final, multiple falls caused the team to win the silver medal behind Japan. Then in the all-around final, he won the bronze medal behind Japan's Shinnosuke Oka and teammate Zhang.
