= Nariman Kurbanov =

Kazakh gymnast (born 1997)

- Нариман Курбанов
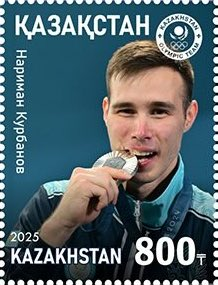
- Kurbanov at the 2024 Olympic Games as depicted on a 2025 Kazakh stamp

Personal information
- Born: 6 December 1997 (age 28) Almaty, Kazakhstan
- Height: 185 cm (6 ft 1 in)
- Spouse: Aida Bauyrzhanova (m. 2024)

Gymnastics career
- Discipline: Men's artistic gymnastics
- Country represented: Kazakhstan
- Club: Dynamo Kazakhstan
- Head coach: Khussaanzhan Kurbanov
- Eponymous skills: Kurbanov (E) (pommel horse): travelling backwards in cross support over both pommels
Medal record
Representing Kazakhstan
Olympic Games
Silver medal – second place	2024 Paris	Pommel horse
Asian Games
Bronze medal – third place	2022 Hangzhou	Pommel horse
Asian Championships
Gold medal – first place	2023 Singapore	Pommel horse
Gold medal – first place	2024 Tashkent	Pommel horse
Gold medal – first place	2025 Jecheon	Pommel horse
Silver medal – second place	2022 Doha	Pommel horse
Bronze medal – third place	2023 Singapore	Team
Bronze medal – third place	2025 Jecheon	Team
World University Games
Silver medal – second place	2019 Naples	Pommel horse
Silver medal – second place	2021 Chengdu	Pommel horse
Islamic Solidarity Games
Silver medal – second place	2021 Konya	Pommel horse
Bronze medal – third place	2021 Konya	Team
FIG World Cup
Event	1st	2nd	3rd
Apparatus World Cup	5	3	6
World Challenge Cup	4	4	0
Total	9	7	6

Nariman Khusanzhanovich Kurbanov (Russian: Нариман Хусанжанович Курбанов; born 6 December 1997) is a Kazakh artistic gymnast who is a pommel horse specialist. He is the 2024 Olympic silver medalist as well as the 2023, 2024 and 2025 Asian champion on the event. He is also the 2022 Asian Games bronze medalist on the pommel horse.

== Early life ==
Kurbanov was born in Almaty in 1997. He is an ethnic Uyghur. Kurbanov began gymnastics when he was five years old and has been coached by his father, Khussaanzhan, since 2004.

== Career ==
Kurbanov made his international debut at the 2017 World Championships and successfully performed a new skill on the pommel horse that was named after him in the Code of Points. He placed 54th on the pommel horse during the qualification round.

=== 2018 ===
At his second international competition, the Melbourne World Cup, Kurbanov won a gold medal on the pommel horse. He then placed seventh at the Baku World Cup. At the Koper World Challenge Cup, he won the silver medal behind Kōhei Kameyama. He represented Kazakhstan at the 2018 Asian Games, finishing sixth on the pommel horse and sixth with the Kazakhstan team. Then at the World Championships in Doha, he qualified for the pommel horse event final and placed fifth.

=== 2019 ===
Kurbanov began the season at the Baku World Cup, finishing fourth on the pommel horse. He then competed at the Koper World Challenge Cup despite a 40-degree fever, and he finished ninth. He competed a lower-difficulty routine at the Universiade but still won the silver medal behind Lee Chih-kai. This was the first time in 16 years that an artistic gymnast from Kazakhstan won a medal at the Universiade. Then at the World Championships, he placed 12th in the qualification round, making him the second reserve for the pommel horse final.

=== 2020–21 ===
Kurbanov competed at the 2020 Baku World Cup and finished fifth on the pommel horse in the qualification round. However, the event finals were canceled due to the COVID-19 pandemic. He returned to competition in November 2020 at the Szombathely World Challenge Cup and won the pommel horse gold medal.

Kurbanov won a silver medal on the pommel horse behind Matvei Petrov at the 2021 Osijek World Challenge Cup. He also won the pommel horse silver medal at the 2021 Doha World Cup. At the 2021 World Championships, he finished fourth in the pommel horse final, only 0.134 away from winning a medal.

=== 2022 ===
Kurbanov won the pommel horse titles at the Doha and Baku World Cups. He also placed seventh at the Cottbus World Cup and eighth at the Cairo World Cup. He was the overall pommel horse winner of the 2022 FIG World Cup series. He then won the pommel horse gold medal at the Szombathely World Challenge Cup. Then at the Asian Championships, he won the silver medal on the pommel horse behind Jordan's Ahmad Abu Al-Soud.

Kurbanov competed at the Islamic Solidarity Games alongside Milad Karimi and Dmitriy Patanin, and they won the team bronze medal. Individually, Kurbanov won the silver medal on the pommel horse once again behind Abu Al-Soud. Then at the Paris World Challenge Cup, he won the pommel horse silver medal, and he won the gold medal at the Szombathely World Challenge Cup. He finished fourth on the pommel horse at the World Championships for the second year in a row.

=== 2023 ===
Kurbanov was the top qualifier for the pommel horse final at the Cottbus World Cup but won the bronze medal in the final. One week later, he won the gold medal at the Doha World Cup. He also won the gold at the Baku World Cup. He won the overall World Cup series pommel horse title for the second year in a row. Then at the Asian Championships, he won a bronze medal with his Kazakhstan teammates, and he won the pommel horse title.

Kurbanov competed at the World University Games, winning the silver medal on the pommel horse behind Lee Chih-kai. Then at the Asian Games, he won the bronze medal behind Lee and Ryota Tsumura. He finished 16th in the qualification round of the World Championships, failing to qualify for the event final.

=== 2024 ===
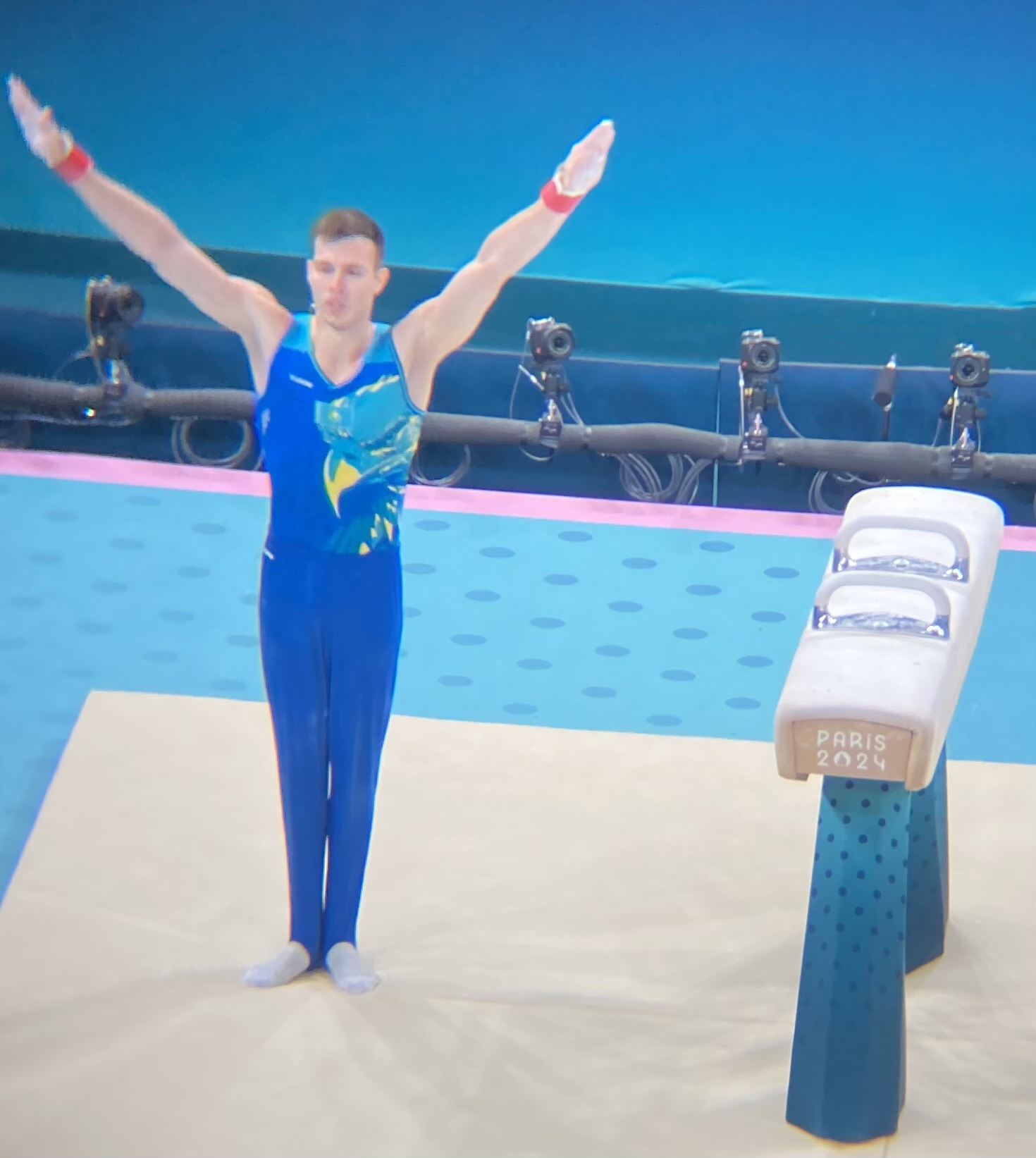
Kurbanov at the 2024 Olympic Games

Kurbanov registered to compete in the 2024 FIG World Cup series, which served as an Olympic qualifier. The top two eligible gymnasts on each apparatus would earn an Olympic berth, and the pommel horse field was predicted to be especially competitive. At the first event in Cairo, Kurbanov fell off the pommel horse, but he came back to win the gold medal at the second event in Cottbus. He then finished fourth at the events in Baku and Doha. With these results, Kurbanov finished second overall and qualified for the 2024 Summer Olympics.

Kurbanov also competed in the 2024 World Challenge Cup series. At the first event in Antalya, he won the silver medal on the pommel horse by one-tenth of a point behind Ahmad Abu Al-Soud. He then won the gold medal at the event in Varna. He successfully defended his title at the Asian Championships.

At the Olympics, he won a silver medal in the pommel horse event, with a score of 15.433, behind Rhys McClenaghan of Ireland.

Akorda held a solemn awards ceremony for the medalists of the Summer Olympics in Paris on August 27. Olympians and their coaches received state awards from the hands of the President of Kazakhstan Kasym-Jomart Tokayev. Despite the pomp of the event, Kurbanov did not attend and did not receive awards.

=== 2025 ===
Kurbanov competed at various various World Cups throughout 2025, winning gold in Antalya and bronze in Osijek and Doha. At the 2025 Asian Championships Kurbanov won his third consecutive Asian title on pommel horse. At the 2025 World Championships he qualified to the pommel horse final in first place; during the event final he fell and finished seventh.

== Personal life ==
Kurbanov graduated from the Kazakh Academy of Sport and Tourism with a degree in coaching. In 2022, he graduated from Al-Farabi Kazakh National University with a law degree.

In September 2024 Kurbanov married fellow Kazakh gymnast Aida Bauyrzhanova. In February 2026, they announced they were expecting their first child together. In June 2026, they announced the birth of their daughter.

== Eponymous skill ==
Kurbanov has a pommel horse skill named after him in the Code of Points.

Apparatus	Name	Description	Difficulty (Note: Valid for the 2022–2024 Code of Points)	Added to Code of Points
Pommel horse	Kurbanov	Travelling backwards in cross support over both pommels	E	2017 World Championships

== Competitive history ==
Competitive history of Nariman Kurbanov
Year	Event	Team	AA	FX	PH	SR	VT	PB	HB
2017
2017	World Championships				54				
2018	Melbourne World Cup				1st place, gold medalist(s)				
2018	Baku World Cup				7				
2018	Koper World Challenge Cup				2nd place, silver medalist(s)				
2018	Asian Games	6			6				
2018	World Championships	16			5				
2019	Baku World Cup				4				
2019	Koper World Challenge Cup				9				
2019	Universiade				2nd place, silver medalist(s)				
2019	World Championships	16			R2				
2020	Baku World Cup				5				
2020	Szombathely World Challenge Cup				1st place, gold medalist(s)				
2021	Doha World Cup				2nd place, silver medalist(s)				
2021	Osijek World Challenge Cup				2nd place, silver medalist(s)				
2021	World Championships				4				
2022	Cottbus World Cup				7				
2022	Doha World Cup				1st place, gold medalist(s)				
2022	Cairo World Cup				8				
2022	Baku World Cup				1st place, gold medalist(s)				
2022	Asian Championships	5			2nd place, silver medalist(s)				
2022	Islamic Solidarity Games	3rd place, bronze medalist(s)			2nd place, silver medalist(s)				
2022	Paris World Challenge Cup				2nd place, silver medalist(s)				
2022	Szombathely World Challenge Cup				1st place, gold medalist(s)				
2022	World Championships	18			4				
2023	Cottbus World Cup				3rd place, bronze medalist(s)				
2023	Doha World Cup				1st place, gold medalist(s)				
2023	Baku World Cup				1st place, gold medalist(s)				
2023	Cairo World Cup				7				
2023	Asian Championships	3rd place, bronze medalist(s)			1st place, gold medalist(s)				
2023	World University Games				2nd place, silver medalist(s)				
2023	Asian Games	6			3rd place, bronze medalist(s)				
2023	World Championships	18			16				
2024	Cairo World Cup				5				
2024	Cottbus World Cup				1st place, gold medalist(s)				
2024	Baku World Cup				4				
2024	Doha World Cup				4				
2024	Antalya World Challenge Cup				2nd place, silver medalist(s)				
2024	Varna World Challenge Cup				1st place, gold medalist(s)				
2024	Asian Championships	4			1st place, gold medalist(s)				
2024	Olympic Games				2nd place, silver medalist(s)				
2025	Antalya World Cup				1st place, gold medalist(s)				
2025	Osijek World Cup				3rd place, bronze medalist(s)				
2025	Doha World Cup				3rd place, bronze medalist(s)				
2025	Asian Championships	3rd place, bronze medalist(s)			1st place, gold medalist(s)				
2025	Paris World Challenge Cup				1st place, gold medalist(s)				
2025	World Championships	—N/a			7				
2026	Cottbus World Cup				3rd place, bronze medalist(s)				
2026	Cairo World Cup				3rd place, bronze medalist(s)				
2026	Osijek World Cup				3rd place, bronze medalist(s)				
2026	Koper World Challenge Cup				7				
2026	Asian Games				R3				
2026	World Championships	12			4				
