= Fuya Maeno =

Japanese artistic gymnast

- Born: 8 July 1996 (age 30) Narita, Japan
- Height: 1.63 m (5 ft 4 in)

Gymnastics career
- Discipline: Men's artistic gymnastics
- Country represented: Japan
- College team: NIFS Kanoya
- Club: Central Sports
- Head coach: Yoshihiro Saito
Medal record
Representing Japan
Asian Games
Silver medal – second place	2018 Jakarta	Team
FIG World Cup
Gold medal – first place	2017 Szombathely	Floor Exercise
Gold medal – first place	2016 Doha	Horizontal Bar
Silver medal – second place	2017 Szombathely	Pommel Horse
Silver medal – second place	2017 Szombathely	Horizontal Bar
Silver medal – second place	2016 Szombathely	Horizontal Bar
Bronze medal – third place	2016 São Paulo	Pommel Horse

Fuya Maeno (前野 風哉, Maeno Fuya; born 8 July 1996) is a Japanese artistic gymnast. Born in Chiba, Japan, he graduated from National Institute of Fitness and Sports in Kanoya and later join Central Sports gymnastic club. Maeno was part of Japan men's national gymnastics team that won the silver at 2018 Asian Games.

== See also ==
- Japan men's national gymnastics team
