= Kenta Chiba =

Japanese artistic gymnast

- Born: 4 April 1996 (age 30)

Gymnastics career
- Discipline: Men's artistic gymnastics
- Country represented: Japan
Medal record
Representing Japan
World Championships
Gold medal – first place	2023 Antwerp	Team
Asian Games
Silver medal – second place	2018 Jakarta	Team
Bronze medal – third place	2018 Jakarta	Parallel bars
Summer Universiade
Gold medal – first place	2017 Taipei	Team

Kenta Chiba (千葉健太, Chiba Kenta; born 4 April 1996) is a Japanese artistic gymnast. He won the silver medal in the men's team event at the 2018 Asian Games in Jakarta, Indonesia. He also won the bronze medal in the parallel bars event. He reached the final in both the horizontal bar and pommel horse events.

At the 2017 Summer Universiade held in Taipei, Taiwan, he won the gold medal in the men's team all-around event.
