= Rasuljon Abdurakhimov =

Uzbekistani gymnast (born 1996)

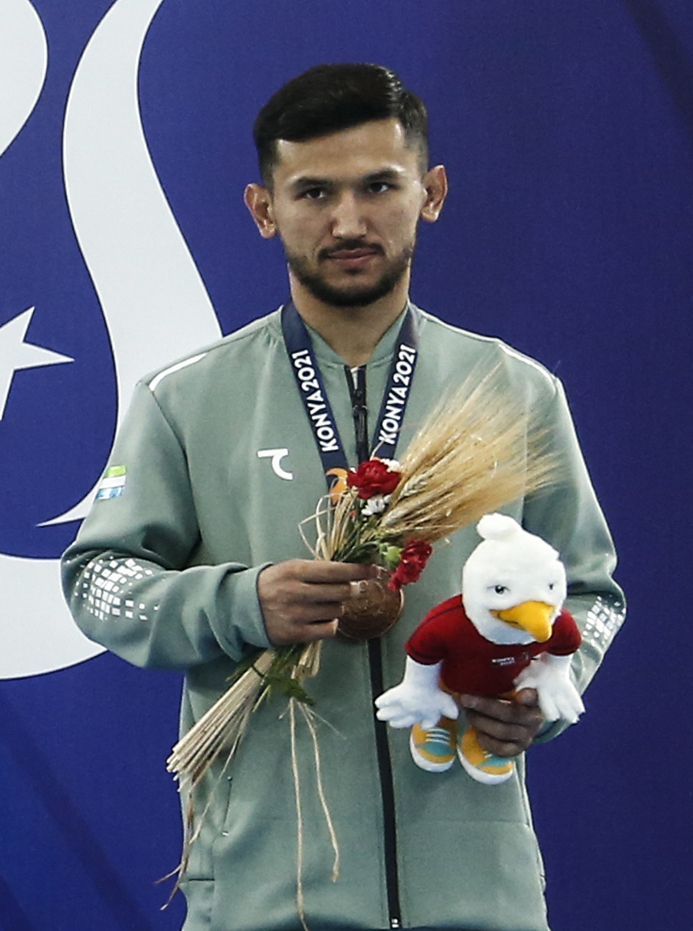
- Abdurakhimov at the 2021 Islamic Solidarity Games

Personal information
- Full name: Rasuljon Shukhratovich Abdurakhimov
- Nickname: Rasul
- Born: 3 October 1996 (age 29) Fergana, Uzbekistan
- Height: 1.64 m (5 ft 5 in)

Gymnastics career
- Discipline: Men's artistic gymnastics
- Country represented: Uzbekistan; (2010–present)
- Head coach: Ruslan Irgashev
Medal record
Representing Uzbekistan
Asian Games
Bronze medal – third place	2026 Aichi–Nagoya	Parallel bars
Asian Championships
Silver medal – second place	2024 Tashkent	Team
Bronze medal – third place	2024 Tashkent	Parallel bars
Islamic Solidarity Games
Silver medal – second place	2021 Konya	Team
Bronze medal – third place	2021 Konya	All-around
Bronze medal – third place	2021 Konya	Parallel bars
FIG World Cup
Event	1st	2nd	3rd
Apparatus World Cup	0	1	1
World Challenge Cup	1	0	0
Total	1	1	1

Rasuljon Shukhratovich Abdurakhimov (born 3 October 1996) is an Uzbek gymnast. At the 2024 Asian Championships, he won a silver medal in the team event and a bronze medal on the parallel bars. He is the 2021 Islamic Solidarity Games all-around and parallel bars bronze medal. He competed in the 2020 and 2024 Olympic Games.

== Early and personal life ==
Abdurakhimov was born on 3 October 1996 in Fergana. He began gymnastics in his hometown at the age of five and moved to Tashkent for his training. He has a wife, Barno Valieva, and one son.

== Career ==
=== 2014–17 ===
Abdurakhimov began competing in senior international competitions in 2014. He represented Uzbekistan at the 2014 Asian Games and finished seventh with the team. Then at the 2014 World Championships, the Uzbekistan team finished 32nd, and Abdurakhimov finished 127th in the individual all-around. He finished 18th in the all-around at the 2017 Asian Championships.

=== 2018–19 ===
Abdurakhimov represented Uzbekistan at the 2018 Asian Games and placed seventh with the team. He finished 13th in the individual all-around. He also qualified for the parallel bars final, finishing eighth. Then at the 2018 World Championships, the Uzbekistan team finished 38th, and Abdurakhimov finished 69th in the individual all-around.

Abdurakhimov competed at the 2019 Summer Universiade but did not advance to any finals. He then competed at the 2019 World Championships, finishing 45th in the all-around and earning a berth for the 2020 Summer Olympics.

=== 2021–22 ===
Abdurakhimov finished seventh in the parallel bars at the 2021 Varna World Challenge Cup. He then competed at the Olympic Games and finished 49th in the all-around during the qualification round.

Abdurakhimov finished fifth on the parallel bars at the 2022 Cairo World Cup. Then at the Islamic Solidarity Games, he won a silver medal with teammates Abdulla Azimov and Khabibullo Ergashev. Individually, he won the bronze medal in the all-around behind Adem Asil and Ivan Tikhonov. He then won another bronze medal in the parallel bars final.

=== 2023 ===
Abdurakhimov finished seventh on the parallel bars at the 2023 Baku World Cup. He then won his first FIG World Cup medal at the 2023 Varna World Challenge Cup with a gold medal on the parallel bars. He also finished eighth on the horizontal bar. Then at the 2023 Asian Championships, he finished fifth in the horizontal bar final and with the Uzbekistan team. He finished fourth on both the parallel bars and horizontal bar at the Mersin World Challenge Cup. He then competed at the 2023 World Championships where Uzbekistan finished 17th in team qualifications.

=== 2024 ===
Abdurakhimov competed in the 2024 FIG World Cup series to earn points for Olympic qualification. At the first event in Cairo, he finished sixth on the parallel bars. He won the bronze medal on the parallel bars behind Ukrainians Illia Kovtun and Oleg Verniaiev. Then in Doha, he finished fifth in the parallel bars final. As the second-highest eligible overall finisher on the parallel bars, he won a berth for the 2024 Summer Olympics. He then competed at the 2024 Asian Championships, he won a silver medal in the team competition behind China. Then in the parallel bars final, he won the bronze medal behind Carlos Yulo and Yin Dehang. He represented Uzbekistan at the 2024 Summer Olympics, competing on the parallel bars and finishing 22nd in the qualification round.

== Awards ==
After competing in the 2020 Olympic Games, Abdurakhimov received the Builder of the Future medal from the President of Uzbekistan.
