= Hung Yuan-hsi =

Taiwanese artistic gymnast

- Born: 27 July 2001 (age 25) Taipei, Taiwan
- Height: 160 cm (5 ft 3 in)

Gymnastics career
- Discipline: Men's artistic gymnastics
- Country represented: Chinese Taipei
- Club: Taipei University of Business
- Head coaches: Kuo Ting-chang, Hung Shih-tung
Medal record
Representing Chinese Taipei
Asian Games
Bronze medal – third place	2026 Aichi-Nagoya	Team
Asian Championships
Bronze medal – third place	2022 Doha	Team
Bronze medal – third place	2026 Zunyi	Parallel bars
FIG World Cup
Event	1st	2nd	3rd
Apparatus World Cup	0	1	0
World Challenge Cup	0	1	0
Total	0	2	0

Hung Yuan-hsi (born 27 July 2001) is a Taiwanese artistic gymnast. He represented Chinese Taipei at the 2020 Summer Olympics and won a bronze medal in the team event at the 2022 Asian Championships.

== Career ==
Hung began gymnastics when he was six years old after following his brother into the sport. He finished 18th in the all-around at the 2018 Junior Asian Championships.

Hung was initially selected as an alternate for the 2020 Olympic Games. However, when Yu Chao-wei tore his ACL, Hung was added to the team. The team finished tenth in the qualification round and did not advance into the team final. After the Olympic Games, he competed at the 2021 World Championships but did not advance into any of the finals.

Hung competed at the 2022 Asian Championships in Doha, and helped the Chinese Taipei team win the bronze medal behind China and Japan. He also qualified for the parallel bars event final and finished sixth. At the 2022 Szombathely World Challenge Cup, he finished fourth on the parallel bars and eighth on the still rings. He competed with the Chinese Taipei team that finished 17th in the qualification round of the 2022 World Championships.

Hung won a silver medal on the parallel bars behind Carlos Yulo at the 2024 Doha World Cup. He also advanced to the parallel bars final at the Cottbus World Cup and finished seventh. At the 2024 Koper World Challenge Cup, he won a silver medal on the parallel bars behind Illia Kovtun.

At the 2025 Asian Championships, Hung advanced to the floor exercise final and finished fifth. Additionally, he helped Chinese Taipei finish fifth in the team competition.
