= Park Min-soo =

South Korean artistic gymnast

- Full name: Park Min-soo
- Born: 21 November 1994 (age 31) Seoul, South Korea
- Height: 1.64 m (5 ft 5 in)

Gymnastics career
- Discipline: Men's artistic gymnastics
- Country represented: South Korea (2015)
- Club: Hanyang University
- Head coach: Yoon Chang-soon (윤창선)
Medal record
Representing South Korea
Asian Games
Silver medal – second place	2014 Incheon	Team
Bronze medal – third place	2018 Jakarta	Team

Park Min-soo (Korean: 박민수; born November 21, 1994) is a South Korean male artistic gymnast and a member of the national team. He participated at the 2015 World Artistic Gymnastics Championships in Glasgow, and qualified for the 2016 Summer Olympics.
