= Shiao Yu-jan =

Taiwenese artistic gymnast

- Born: 9 December 1999 (age 26)
- Height: 171 cm (5 ft 7 in)

Gymnastics career
- Discipline: Men's artistic gymnastics
- Country represented: Chinese Taipei
Medal record
Representing Chinese Taipei
Asian Games
Bronze medal – third place	2022 Hangzhou	Team
Bronze medal – third place	2026 Aichi-Nagoya	Team
Asian Championships
Bronze medal – third place	2019 Ulaanbaatar	Team
World University Games
Bronze medal – third place	2021 Chengdu	Pommel horse
FIG World Cup
Event	1st	2nd	3rd
Apparatus World Cup	1	0	2
World Challenge Cup	1	1	2
Total	2	1	4

Shiao Yu-jan (simplified Chinese: 萧佑然; traditional Chinese: 蕭佑然; pinyin: Xiāo Yòurán; born 9 December 1999) is a Taiwanese artistic gymnast. He won team bronze medals at the 2022 Asian Games and at the 2019 Asian Championships. He is the 2021 World University Games pommel horse bronze medalist, and he represented Chinese Taipei at the 2020 Summer Olympics.

== Career ==
Shiao represented Chinese Taipei at the 2018 Asian Games held in Jakarta, Indonesia, and helped the team finish fourth.

Shiao competed with the team that won the bronze medal at the 2019 Asian Championships. He then competed at the World Artistic Gymnastics Championships held in Stuttgart, Germany, where the team placed eighth in the qualification round and qualified a team for the Olympic Games for the first time since 1964. The team also qualified for its first-ever team final, and they finished sixth.

Shiao was selected to represent Chinese Taipei at the 2020 Summer Olympics alongside Hung Yuan-hsi, Lee Chih-kai, and Tang Chia-hung. The team finished 10th in the qualification round, making them the second reserve for the team final.

Shiao won the pommel horse bronze medal at the 2022 Paris World Challenge Cup, behind Rhys McClenaghan and Nariman Kurbanov. He then won the pommel horse silver medal at the Szombathely World Challenge Cup, behind Kurbanov. At the Mersin World Challenge Cup, he won the pommel horse gold medal and won the overall World Challenge Cup pommel horse title.

At the 2023 Doha World Cup, Shiao won the pommel horse bronze medal. He then competed at the World University Games and won the pommel horse bronze medal. Then at the Asian Games, he helped the team win the bronze medal, and he placed fourth in the pommel horse final.

Shiao won the pommel horse bronze medal at the 2024 Baku World Cup. He then won another bronze medal at the Szombathely World Challenge Cup. At the 2025 Cottbus World Cup, Shiao won his first World Cup title in three years.
