= Lee Jun-ho (gymnast) =

South Korean artistic gymnast (born 1995)

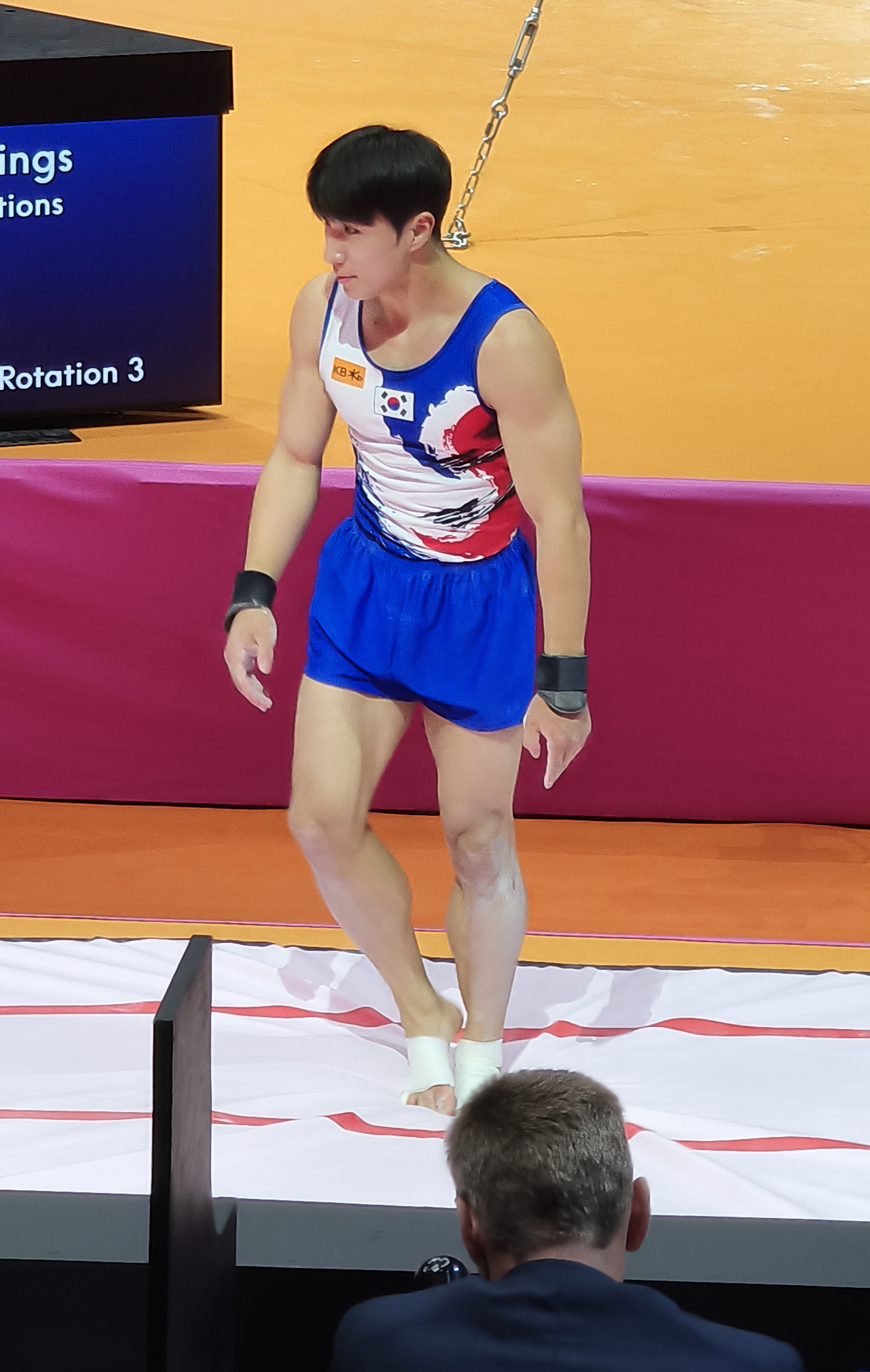
- Lee at the 2025 World Championships.

Personal information
- Nickname: Jaemijuno
- Born: 22 October 1995 (age 30) Seoul, South Korea
- Height: 1.70 m (5 ft 7 in)

Gymnastics career
- Discipline: Men's artistic gymnastics
- Country represented: South Korea
- Club: Korea National Sport University
- Head coach: Jo Seong-Min
Medal record
Representing South Korea
Asian Games
Bronze medal – third place	2018 Jakarta	Team
Asian Gymnastics Championships
Bronze medal – third place	2012 Putian	Floor exercise
Bronze medal – third place	2015 Hiroshima	Team
Bronze medal – third place	2015 Hiroshima	Horizontal bar
Summer Universiade
Silver medal – second place	2015 Gwangju	Team

Lee Jun-ho (Korean: 이준호; born 22 October 1995) is a South Korean artistic gymnast who represented South Korea at the 2020 and 2024 Olympic Games. He won a bronze medal in the team competition at the 2018 Asian Games. He is a three-time Asian Championships bronze medalist.

== Early life ==
Lee was born in 1995 in Seoul. He began gymnastics when he was ten years old.

== Gymnastics career ==
At the 2012 Asian Championships, Lee won a bronze medal on the floor exercise behind Kenzō Shirai and Kim Han-sol. He represented South Korea at the 2015 Summer Universiade and helped the team win the silver medal behind Japan. Then at the 2015 Asian Championships, he won a bronze medal with the South Korean team and on the horizontal bar. He made his World Championships debut in 2015 where South Korea placed seventh in the team final.

Lee competed at the 2016 Glasgow World Cup and placed ninth in the all-around. He represented South Korea at the 2018 Asian Games and helped the team win the bronze medal behind China and Japan. He competed with the South Korean team that placed 13th in the qualification round of the 2018 World Championships.

At the 2019 World Championships, Lee helped the South Korean team finish ninth in the qualification round, making them the first reserve for the team final. Additionally, this result earned South Korea a team berth for the 2020 Olympics. After the World Championships, he competed at the 2019 Swiss Cup Zürich alongside Yeo Seo-jeong, and they finished seventh.

Lee finished second in the all-around at South Korea's Olympic Trials and was selected to represent South Korea at the 2020 Summer Olympics alongside Kim Han-sol, Ryu Sung-hyun, and Yang Hak-seon. At the Olympic Games, the team placed 11th during the qualification round. Individually, he finished 22nd in the all-around final. After the Olympic Games, he competed at the World Championships but did not qualify for any finals.

Lee finished fifth on the vault at the 2022 Doha World Cup. Then at the 2022 World Championships, he helped South Korea qualify for the team final and place eighth. Individually, he qualified for the vault final and placed sixth.

At the 2023 World Championships, Lee finished 23rd in the all-around during the qualification round. With this result, he earned an individual berth for the 2024 Olympic Games. He also finished 23rd in the all-around final.

== Competitive history ==
Competitive history of Lee Jun-ho
Year	Event	Team	AA	FX	PH	SR	VT	PB	HB
2012
2012	Asian Championships	4	4	3rd place, bronze medalist(s)			5		
2015	Summer Universiade	2nd place, silver medalist(s)							
2015	Asian Championships	3rd place, bronze medalist(s)	4	7					3rd place, bronze medalist(s)
2015	World Championships	7							
2016	Glasgow World Cup		9						
2018
2018	Asian Games	3rd place, bronze medalist(s)	9					7	
2018	World Championships	13							
2019
2019	World Championships	R1							
2019	Swiss Cup	7							
2021	Olympic Trials		2nd place, silver medalist(s)						
2021	Olympic Games	11	22						
2021	World Championships		40						
2022	Doha World Cup						5		
2022	World Championships	8					6		
2023
2023	World Championships		23						
2024
2024	Olympic Games		38						
