= Kim Han-sol (gymnast) =

South Korean artistic gymnast

- Born: 29 December 1995 (age 30) Seoul, South Korea
- Height: 1.70 m (5 ft 7 in)

Gymnastics career
- Discipline: Men's artistic gymnastics
- Country represented: South Korea (2012–2024)
- Club: Korean National Sport University
- Head coach: Yoon Chang-soon
Medal record
Representing South Korea
Artistic Gymnastics
World Championships
Bronze medal – third place	2017 Montreal	Vault
Asian Games
Gold medal – first place	2018 Jakarta	Floor exercise
Gold medal – first place	2022 Hangzhou	Floor exercise
Silver medal – second place	2018 Jakarta	Vault
Bronze medal – third place	2018 Jakarta	Team
Asian Championships
Silver medal – second place	2017 Bangkok	Team
Silver medal – second place	2017 Bangkok	Vault
Silver medal – second place	2022 Doha	Floor exercise
Silver medal – second place	2022 Doha	Vault
Bronze medal – third place	2012 Putian	Vault
Bronze medal – third place	2015 Hiroshima	Team
Bronze medal – third place	2015 Hiroshima	Vault
Bronze medal – third place	2017 Bangkok	Floor exercise
Summer Universiade
Gold medal – first place	2019 Naples	Vault
Silver medal – second place	2017 Taipei	Floor exercise

Kim Han-sol (Korean: 김한솔; born 29 December 1995) is a South Korean artistic gymnast. He is the 2017 World bronze medalist on the vault and a two-time Asian Games champion on the floor exercise (2018, 2022). He represented South Korea at the 2016 and 2020 Summer Olympics.

== Gymnastics career ==
Kim began gymnastics when he was in the second grade.

=== 2012–2014 ===
Kim won his first major international medal at the 2012 Asian Championships where he won the silver medal on the floor exercise behind Japan's Kenzō Shirai. He advanced to the floor exercise final at the 2014 World Championships and finished fifth.

=== 2015–2017 ===
Kim helped the South Korean team win the bronze medal behind Japan and China at the 2015 Asian Championships. Individually, he won a bronze medal on the vault. Then at the 2015 World Championships, he helped South Korea finish seventh in the team final and earn an Olympic quota for a full team. He qualified for the floor exercise final, finishing sixth, and the vault final, finishing eighth.

Kim was selected to represent South Korea at the 2016 Summer Olympics alongside Lee Sang-wook, Park Min-soo, Shin Dong-hyen, and Yoo Won-chul. The team finished 11th in the qualification round, and Kim did not advance into any finals. At the 2017 Asian Championships, he helped South Korea win the team silver behind China. Individually, he won a bronze medal on the floor exercise and a silver medal on the vault. He then represented South Korea at the 2017 Summer Universiade and helped the team finish fourth. He won the silver medal in the floor exercise final behind Russia's Kirill Prokopev. Then at the 2017 World Championships, he won the bronze medal on the vault behind Kenzō Shirai and Igor Radivilov.

=== 2018–2021 ===
Kim represented South Korea at the 2018 Asian Games and helped the team win the bronze medal, and he placed sixth in the all-around competition. In the event finals, he won the gold medal on the floor exercise and the silver medal on the vault. He represented South Korea at the 2019 Summer Universiade and won the gold medal on the vault. At the 2019 World Championships, he helped the South Korean team finish ninth in the qualification round, making them the first reserve for the team final. Additionally, this result earned South Korea a team berth for the 2020 Olympics.

Kim was selected to represent South Korea at the 2020 Summer Olympics alongside Lee Jun-ho, Ryu Sung-hyun, and Yang Hak-seon. At the Olympic Games, the team placed 11th during the qualification round. Individually, he was the third reserve for the all-around final. He did qualify for the floor exercise final where he finished eighth.

=== 2022–2024 ===
At the 2022 Asian Championships, Kim won the silver medals on the floor exercise and the vault, both behind Carlos Yulo. Then at the 2022 World Championships, he helped South Korea finish eighth in the team final, and he finished eighth in the vault final.

Kim represented South Korea at the 2022 Asian Games, held in 2023 due to COVID-19, and helped the team finish fourth. He successfully defended his Asian Games floor exercise title. He was unable to compete at the 2024 Summer Olympics due to a knee injury and was replaced by Hur Woong.
