= Lin Chaopan =

Chinese artistic gymnast

- Nickname: Prince of Gymnastics
- Born: 27 August 1995 (age 31) Jinjiang, China
- Height: 1.63 m (5 ft 4 in)

Gymnastics career
- Country represented: China
- Club: Fujian Province
- Head coach: Wang Hongwei
Medal record
Representing China
Olympic Games
Bronze medal – third place	2016 Rio de Janeiro	Team
Bronze medal – third place	2020 Tokyo	Team
World Championships
Gold medal – first place	2013 Antwerp	Parallel Bars
Gold medal – first place	2014 Nanning	Team
Gold medal – first place	2018 Doha	Team
Silver medal – second place	2017 Montreal	All-Around
Silver medal – second place	2019 Stuttgart	Team
Silver medal – second place	2023 Antwerp	Team
Bronze medal – third place	2015 Glasgow	Team
Asian Games
Gold medal – first place	2018 Jakarta	Team
Gold medal – first place	2018 Jakarta	All-Around
Gold medal – first place	2022 Hangzhou	Team
Silver medal – second place	2022 Hangzhou	Horizontal Bar
Bronze medal – third place	2018 Jakarta	Floor Exercise
Bronze medal – third place	2022 Hangzhou	Floor Exercise
Asian Championships
Gold medal – first place	2012 Putian	Team
Gold medal – first place	2017 Bangkok	Team
Gold medal – first place	2017 Bangkok	Floor Exercise
Gold medal – first place	2017 Bangkok	Horizontal Bar
Gold medal – first place	2022 Doha	Team
Silver medal – second place	2012 Putian	Horizontal Bar
Silver medal – second place	2017 Bangkok	All-Around
Silver medal – second place	2022 Doha	Horizontal Bar
National Gamess
Gold medal – first place	2017 Tianjin	All-Around
Silver medal – second place	2021 Shaanxi	Horizontal Bar
Bronze medal – third place	2017 Tianjin	Floor Exercise
Bronze medal – third place	2017 Tianjin	Parallel Bars
Bronze medal – third place	2017 Tianjin	Horizontal Bar

Lin Chaopan (Chinese: 林超攀; pinyin: Lín Chāopān, born 27 August 1995) is a Chinese artistic gymnast. He competed in the 2016 Summer Olympics in Rio de Janeiro, as well as the 2020 Summer Olympics in Tokyo, Japan.

== Early life and education ==
Lin was born on 27 August 1995 in Jinjiang, China. He started gymnastics at age five in Quanzhou, China after being scouting by coach Shi Boping. Lin studied coaching at Beijing Sport University.

== Gymnastics career ==
=== 2013 ===
Lin made his World Championships debut at the 2013 World Artistic Gymnastics Championships in Antwerp, Belgium. In the parallel bars final, he won the gold with a score of 15.666. He also placed eighth at the horizontal bar final and ninth in the Individual All-Around.

=== 2014 ===
Lin was selected to compete at the 2014 World Artistic Gymnastics Championships in Nanning, China, where he helped China win team gold. Lin failed to qualify for any individual finals.

=== 2015 ===
Lin competed at the World Championships in Glasgow, Great Britain, where his team placed third. He failed to qualify for any individual finals.

=== 2016 ===
At the 2016 Chinese Gymnastics Championships, Lin won all-around, parallel bars, and floor gold. He competed at the 2016 Olympic Games in Rio de Janeiro, Brazil, where his team placed third.

=== 2017 ===
In August, Lin competed at the Asian Championships in Bangkok, Thailand, where his team placed first. He won second all-around, as well as first on floor exercise and high bar. In October, Lin competed at the World Championships in Montreal, Canada, where he placed second all-around.

=== 2018 ===
In August, Lin competed at the Asian Games in Indonesia, where his team placed first. He placed first all around, as well as third on floor exercise. In October, Lin competed at the World Championships in Doha, Qatar, where his team placed first.

=== 2019 ===
Lin competed at the World Championships in Stuttgart, Germany, where his team placed second.

=== 2021 ===
At the 2020 Summer Olympics in Tokyo, Japan, Lin competed for the People's Republic of China, a team including Sun Wei, Zou Jingyuan, and Xiao Ruoteng. The team won Olympic bronze with a combined score of 262.397, 0.606 points beneath the winning team.

== Awards and honors ==
Lin has received two awards. The General Administration of Sport of China named him an Elite Athlete of International Class in 2014 and presented him the Sports Medal of Honour in 2016.
