= Sun Wei (gymnast) =

Chinese artistic gymnast

- 孙炜
- Born: 12 August 1995 (age 31) Nantong, Jiangsu, China

Gymnastics career
- Discipline: Men's artistic gymnastics
- Country represented: China
- Club: Jiangsu Province
- Head coaches: Wang Hongwei; Lyu Junhai
Medal record
Men's artistic gymnastics
Representing China
Olympic Games
Bronze medal – third place	2020 Tokyo	Team
World Championships
Gold medal – first place	2018 Doha	Team
Gold medal – first place	2022 Liverpool	Team
Silver medal – second place	2019 Stuttgart	Team
Silver medal – second place	2023 Antwerp	Team
Asian Games
Gold medal – first place	2018 Jakarta	Team
Silver medal – second place	2018 Jakarta	Horizontal Bar
Bronze medal – third place	2018 Jakarta	Pommel Horse
Gold medal – first place	2026 Aichi-Nagoya	Team
Asian Championships
Gold medal – first place	2017 Bangkok	Team
National Games
Gold medal – first place	2021 Shaanxi	Team
Gold medal – first place	2025 Guangdong	Team
Silver medal – second place	2017 Tianjin	Team
Silver medal – second place	2021 Shaanxi	Pommel Horse
Bronze medal – third place	2021 Shaanxi	All-Around

Sun Wei (simplified Chinese: 孙炜; traditional Chinese: 孫煒; born 12 August 1995) is a Chinese artistic gymnast. He is a 2018 world champion in the team competition and a member of the 2020 Olympic team.

== Early life and education ==
Sun was born on 12 August 1995 in Nantong, China. He started gymnastics at age three; he was a weak child, and his parents wanted his strength to improve. He studied at the Nanjing Sport Institute.

== Gymnastics career ==
=== 2017 ===
In May 2017, Sun competed at the Asian Championships in Bangkok, Thailand, where his team won gold.

=== 2018 ===
In August, Sun competed at the Asian Games in Indonesia, where his team won gold. Sun placed second on high bar and third on pommel horse.

In October, he was part of the Chinese team at the 2018 World Artistic Gymnastics Championships in Doha, Qatar, and helped his country to a gold medal in the team event. He also qualified for the all-around final where he placed fourth.

=== 2019 ===
Sun competed at the World Championships in Stuttgart, Germany, where his team placed second.

=== 2021 ===
At the 2020 Summer Olympics in Tokyo, Japan, Sun competed for the People's Republic of China, a team including Sun Wei, Zou Jingyuan, Xiao Ruoteng, and Lin Chaopan. The team won Olympic bronze with a combined score of 262.397, 0.606 points beneath the winning team. Sun also qualified for the men's individual all-around, where he placed 4th.

== Detailed Results ==
Year	Tournament	Event	Date	All Around	Floor (gymnastics)	Pommel horse	Rings (gymnastics)	Vault (gymnastics)	Parallel bars	Horizontal bar
2021	Chinese National Championships	Qualification	4 May	82.796	14.066	14.266	14.266	13.066	13.066	14.066
2021	Chinese National Championships	AA Final	6 May	87.697	14.433	14.733	14.166	14.833	15.166	14.366
2021	Chinese National Championships	Event Finals	8 May			13.766				14.300
2021	Chinese Olympic Trials		1 July	88.430	14.666	14.733	14.366	14.966	15.133	14.566
2021	Olympic Games	Qualification	24 July	87.298	14.333	14.833	14.233	14.766	15.133	14.000
2021	Olympic Games	Team Final	26 July	87.465	14.366	15.000	14.233	14.866	14.800	14.200
2021	Olympic Games	AA Final	28 July	87.798	14.500	14.966	14.066	14.900	14.966	14.400
2021	Olympic Games	Event Finals	3 August			13.066				
2021	National Games of China	Qualification	19 September	86.032	12.733	15.000	14.200	14.900	14.733	14.466
2021	National Games of China	Team Final	21 September	85.499	14.233	14.400	14.400	14.200	14.833	13.433
2021	National Games of China	AA Final	23 September	86.365	14.133	15.066	13.700	13.800	15.200	14.466
2021	National Games of China	Event Finals	25 - 26 September			14.960				14.400
