= Kaya Kazuma =

Japanese artistic gymnast

- 萱 和磨
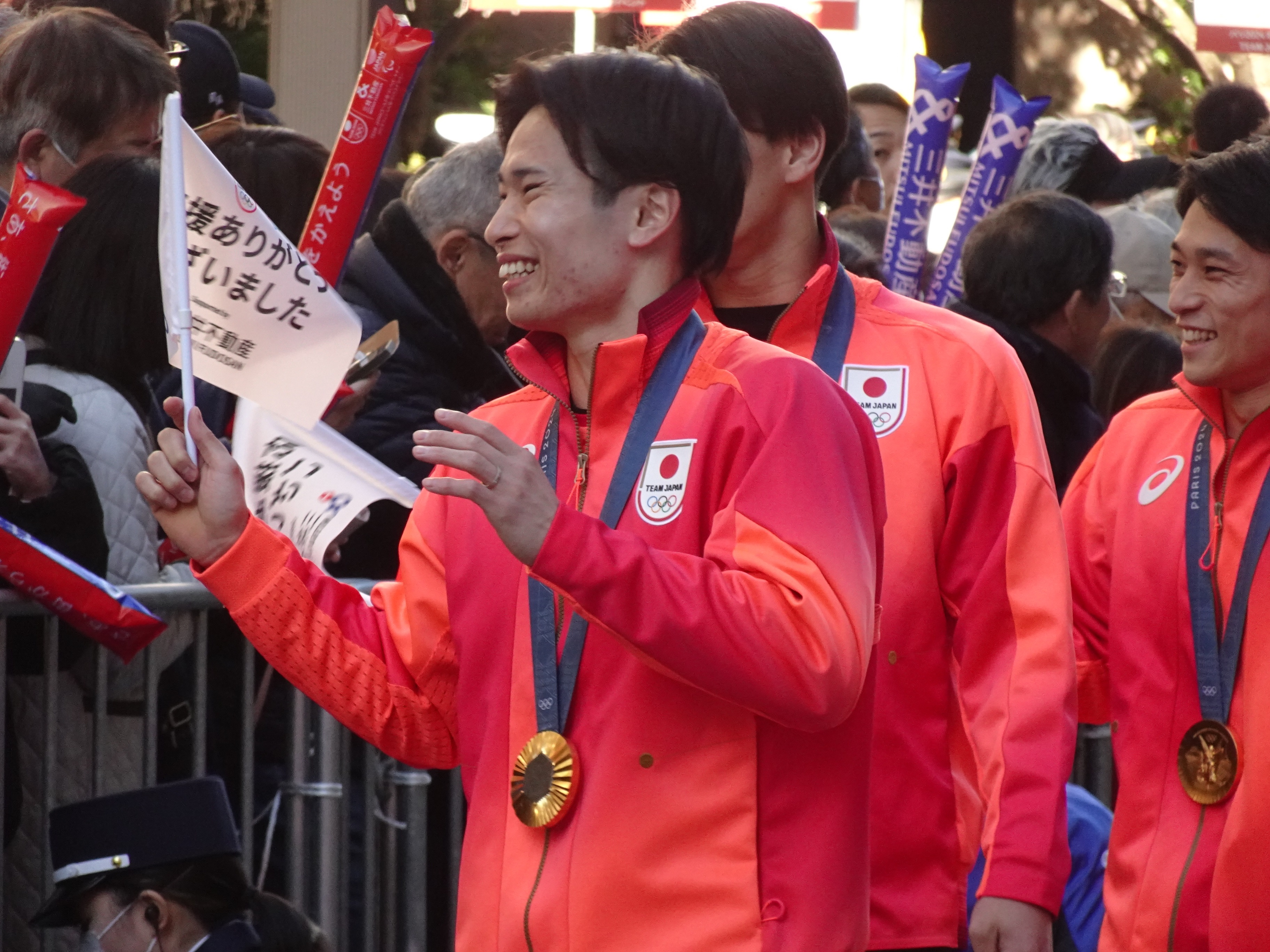
- Kaya at Paris 2024 Summer Olympians and Paralympians Japan National Team parade event on November 30, 2024

Personal information
- Nickname: Kayakun
- Born: 19 November 1996 (age 29) Funabashi, Chiba, Japan
- Height: 1.63 m (5 ft 4 in)

Gymnastics career
- Discipline: Men's artistic gymnastics
- Country represented: Japan; (2015–present)
- Club: Central Sports
- Head coaches: Yoshiri Saito, Hisashi Hizutori
Medal record
Men's artistic gymnastics
Representing Japan
Olympic Games
Gold medal – first place	2024 Paris	Team
Silver medal – second place	2020 Tokyo	Team
Bronze medal – third place	2020 Tokyo	Pommel horse
World Championships
Gold medal – first place	2015 Glasgow	Team
Gold medal – first place	2023 Antwerp	Team
Silver medal – second place	2021 Kitakyushu	Pommel horse
Silver medal – second place	2022 Liverpool	Team
Bronze medal – third place	2015 Glasgow	Pommel horse
Bronze medal – third place	2018 Doha	Team
Bronze medal – third place	2019 Stuttgart	Team
Bronze medal – third place	2019 Stuttgart	Parallel bars
Asian Championships
Gold medal – first place	2015 Hiroshima	Team
Gold medal – first place	2015 Hiroshima	Pommel horse
Gold medal – first place	2025 Jecheon	Team
Bronze medal – third place	2015 Hiroshima	Parallel bars
World University Games
Gold medal – first place	2019 Naples	Team
Gold medal – first place	2019 Naples	All-around
Gold medal – first place	2021 Chengdu	Floor exercise
Silver medal – second place	2019 Naples	Floor exercise
Silver medal – second place	2021 Chengdu	Team
Bronze medal – third place	2019 Naples	Pommel horse
Bronze medal – third place	2021 Chengdu	All-around
Bronze medal – third place	2021 Chengdu	Parallel bars

Kaya Kazuma (萱 和磨; born 19 November 1996) is a Japanese artistic gymnast. He competed at the 2020 Summer Olympics, winning silver with the Japanese team and bronze in the pommel horse. He again competed at the 2024 games as part of the Japanese team which won gold in the all-around competition. He is also a two-time World champion with the Japanese team (2015, 2023) and a two-time World medalist on the pommel horse (2021 silver, 2015 bronze). He is the 2019 Universiade team and all-around champion.

== Early life ==
Kaya began gymnastics in 2004 at the age of eight. He was inspired by watching the Japanese artistic gymnastics team win gold in the team event at the 2004 Olympic Games in Athens, Greece.

While in middle school, Kaya moved to Narashino to train with one of the top gymnastics schools.

== Career ==
Kaya won the all-around title at the 2014 National High School Championships, and he finished 27th at the 2014 All-Japan Championships.

=== 2015 ===
Kaya joined the Juntendo University team and made his national team debut in 2015. At the Asian Championships in Hiroshima, Kaya won a gold medal with the Japanese team. He also placed third in the all-around, but due to the two-per-country rule, he did not receive the bronze medal as he placed behind Ryōhei Katō and Yusuke Tanaka. He then won the gold medal in the pommel horse final and the bronze medal in the parallel bars final. He then competed at the World Championships and helped the Japanese team qualify for the final in first place and earn a team berth for the 2016 Olympic Games. Then in the team final, he competed on the pommel horse and helped the team win the gold medal. Individually, Kaya qualified for the all-around final where he finished in 10th place. Then in the pommel horse final, he tied with Armenia's Harutyun Merdinyan for the bronze medal.

=== 2016–17 ===
Kaya won a silver medal on the still rings and a bronze medal on the parallel bars at the 2016 Baku World Cup. He was an alternate for Japan's 2016 Olympic team.

Kaya won a silver medal in the all-around behind Ukraine's Oleg Verniaiev at the 2017 Stuttgart World Cup. Then at the Szombathely World Challenge Cup, he won gold medals on the pommel horse and parallel bars.

=== 2018 ===
Kaya won the gold medal on the floor exercise at the Baku World Cup. He was then selected to compete at the World Championships in Doha alongside Kenzō Shirai, Yusuke Tanaka, Wataru Tanigawa, and Kōhei Uchimura. In the qualification round, Kaya fell off the pommel horse and failed to qualify for the event final. The Japanese team then finished third in the team final and earned a team berth for the 2020 Olympic Games. Kaya placed sixth in the all-around final and eighth in the floor exercise final.

=== 2019 ===
Kaya won a bronze medal in the all-around at the Birmingham World Cup behind Nikita Nagornyy and Sun Wei. He was then selected to represent Japan at the 2019 Summer Universiade, winning the team gold medal alongside brothers Wataru and Kakeru Tanigawa. Then in the all-around final, Kaya won the gold medal by nearly three points ahead of Russia's Ivan Stretovich. In the event finals, he won silver on the floor exercise and bronze on the pommel horse. Kaya then competed at the World Championships alongside the Tanigawa brothers, Daiki Hashimoto, and Yuya Kamoto, and they won the bronze medal behind Russia and China. He then placed sixth in the all-around final for the second consecutive year. Then in the parallel bars final, he won the bronze medal behind Joe Fraser and Ahmet Önder, which was Japan's only individual medal at these World Championships.

=== 2020 ===
Kaya was scheduled to compete at both the Stuttgart and Birmingham World Cups. However, both of these events were postponed to 2021 and eventually canceled due to the COVID-19 pandemic. In November, Kaya competed at the Friendship and Solidarity Competition in Tokyo, competing as part of Team Friendship who lost to Team Solidarity. Then in December, he won his first national all-around title at the All-Japan Championships.

=== 2021 ===
Kaya won the bronze medal in the all-around at the All-Japan Championships, and he won the silver medal in the all-around at the NHK Trophy, qualifying for the Olympic team.

At the postponed 2020 Summer Olympics in Tokyo, Japan, Kaya was the team captain for Japan, competing alongside Daiki Hashimoto, Takeru Kitazono and Wataru Tanigawa. They won the silver medal in the team final, finishing only 0.103 behind the gold medal-winning Russian Olympic Committee. Individually, Kaya qualified for the pommel horse final and won the bronze medal behind Max Whitlock and Lee Chih-kai.

At the 2021 World Championships held in Kitakyushu, Kaya won the silver on the pommel horse, and he placed sixth on both the floor exercise and parallel bars. After the World Championships, he competed at the All-Japan Team Championships, helping Central Sports win the bronze medal.

=== 2022–23 ===
Kaya was the alternate for the 2022 World Championships team, and he received a silver medal. He then competed in the mixed-team event at the 2022 Swiss Cup Zürich with Chiaki Hatakeda, and they finished fifth.

At the 2023 Cottbus World Cup, Kaya won a silver medal on the floor exercise and a bronze medal on the horizontal bar. He then competed at the World University Games and won a silver medal with the Japanese team. Individually, he won a gold medal on the floor exercise and bronze medals in the all-around and on the parallel bars. He was selected to compete at the World Championships alongside Kenta Chiba, Daiki Hashimoto, Kazuki Minami, and Kaito Sugimoto. The Japanese team won the World title for the first time since 2015, with Kaya being the only member of the 2015 team still competing. Kaya initially qualified for the all-around final behind teammate Chiba and ahead of Hashimoto, who would not be able to compete in the final due to the two-per-country rule. However, the Japanese coaching team pulled Kaya out of the final in favor of Hashimoto. Kaya did compete in the parallel bars final, where he finished fourth. After the World Championships, he once again competed at the Swiss Cup Zürich with Chiaki Hatakeda, and they won the silver medal behind the American team.

=== 2024 ===
Kaya finished second in the all-around at the NHK Trophy and was selected to represent Japan at the 2024 Summer Olympics alongside Daiki Hashimoto, Shinnosuke Oka, Takaaki Sugino, and Wataru Tanigawa. Kaya was once again selected as the team captain. The team won the all-around gold on July 29 defeating long-time rival China.

== Awards ==
Kaya was presented with the Narashino Mayor Award in 2014. He also won the Inzai Citizen Honorary Award in 2015 and 2021, and in 2021, he received the Chiba Citizen Honorary Award.

== Personal life ==
As of 2023, Kaya is studying for a doctoral degree in sports science from Juntendo University. On 11 January 2022, Kaya registered for marriage with his longtime girlfriend.

== Competitive history ==
Competitive history of Kazuma Kaya
Year	Event	Team	AA	FX	PH	SR	VT	PB	HB
2014	National High School Championships		1st place, gold medalist(s)						
2014	All-Japan Championships		27						
2015
2015	Asian Championships	1st place, gold medalist(s)			1st place, gold medalist(s)			3rd place, bronze medalist(s)	
2015	World Championships	1st place, gold medalist(s)	10		3rd place, bronze medalist(s)				
2016	Baku World Cup					2nd place, silver medalist(s)		3rd place, bronze medalist(s)	
2017	Stuttgart World Cup		2nd place, silver medalist(s)						
2017	Szombathely World Challenge Cup				1st place, gold medalist(s)	7		1st place, gold medalist(s)	4
2018	Baku World Cup			1st place, gold medalist(s)		5			5
2018	World Championships	3rd place, bronze medalist(s)	6	8					
2019	Birmingham World Cup		3rd place, bronze medalist(s)						
2019	Universiade	1st place, gold medalist(s)	1st place, gold medalist(s)	2nd place, silver medalist(s)	3rd place, bronze medalist(s)	6		7	
2019	World Championships	3rd place, bronze medalist(s)	6		5			3rd place, bronze medalist(s)	
2020	Friendship and Solidarity Competition	2nd place, silver medalist(s)							
2020	All-Japan Championships		1st place, gold medalist(s)						
2021	All-Japan Championships		3rd place, bronze medalist(s)						
2021	NHK Trophy		2nd place, silver medalist(s)						
2021	Olympic Games	2nd place, silver medalist(s)			3rd place, bronze medalist(s)				
2021	World Championships	—N/a		6	2nd place, silver medalist(s)			6	
2021	All-Japan Team Championships	3rd place, bronze medalist(s)							
2022
2022	World Championships	2nd place, silver medalist(s)							
2022	Swiss Cup Zürich	5							
2023	Cottbus World Cup			2nd place, silver medalist(s)	6			4	3rd place, bronze medalist(s)
2023	World University Games	2nd place, silver medalist(s)	3rd place, bronze medalist(s)	1st place, gold medalist(s)	4			3rd place, bronze medalist(s)	
2023	World Championships	1st place, gold medalist(s)						4	
2023	Swiss Cup Zürich	2nd place, silver medalist(s)							
2024	NHK Trophy		2nd place, silver medalist(s)						
2025	DTB Pokal Team Challenge	1st place, gold medalist(s)							
2025	Asian Championships	1st place, gold medalist(s)							
