= 2023 World Artistic Gymnastics Championships =

Artistic gymnastics competition

- Venue: Sportpaleis
- Location: Antwerp, Belgium
- Start date: 30 September 2023
- End date: 8 October 2023

The 2023 World Artistic Gymnastics Championships were held in Antwerp, Belgium at the Sportpaleis, from 30 September to 8 October 2023. Antwerp hosted the event for the third time; previously the city hosted the first ever World Championships in 1903 and again in 2013.

The championships was a qualification event for the 2024 Olympic Games in Paris. The top nine teams in both the men's and women's team qualifications (not including teams that qualified at the previous year's World Championships) obtained five quota places for Paris as a team. Additionally, numerous individuals qualified with a nominative berth for the Olympic Games.

== Qualification and quotas ==
The first qualification event for the 2023 World Artistic Gymnastics Championships was the 2022 edition of the event in Liverpool, United Kingdom where the top 8 teams advanced on both the men's and women's side. The remaining 32 (16 per gender) team spots were determined at various Continental championships in 2023. 20 spots were conferred at the 2023 European Artistic Gymnastics Championships; 4 at the 2023 Asian Artistic Gymnastics Championships and the 2023 Pan American Artistic Gymnastics Championships, and 2 at the 2023 Oceania Artistic Gymnastics Championships and the 2023 African Artistic Gymnastics Championships. As such, both the men's and women's competition will feature 24 teams.

Individual all-around spots were awarded to the highest ranked gymnasts from nations who hadn't advanced a full team to the Championships. These spots were determined through the Continental championships process, with 40 male and 49 female spots being allocated. As hosts Belgium qualified a full team in both events, their allotted host spots were redistributed through the European Championships rankings, being awarded to Iceland's Valgard Reinhardsson and Luxembourg's Céleste Mordenti.

Individual gymnasts also had an opportunity to advance to the Championships as event specialists through the 2023 FIG Artistic Gymnastics World Cup series. There were 8 spots available on each event for individuals also not from nations who had qualified a team. In total, there were 48 spots available for men across six apparatus and 32 for women across four apparatus. Through all possible qualification routes, 208 men and 201 women are slated to participate in the competition.

=== Men ===
Event	Qualified teams
2022 World Artistic Gymnastics Championships (top 8 teams)	China; Japan (United Kingdom) Great Britain; Italy; United States; Spain; Brazil; South Korea
2023 European Artistic Gymnastics Championships (top 10 teams)	Turkey; Switzerland; Germany; France; Belgium; Ukraine; Hungary; Romania; Netherlands; Israel
2023 Oceania Artistic Gymnastics Championships (top ranked team)	Australia
2023 Pan American Artistic Gymnastics Championships (top 2 teams)	Colombia; Canada
2023 African Artistic Gymnastics Championships (top ranked team)	Egypt
2023 Asian Artistic Gymnastics Championships (top 2 teams)	Kazakhstan; Uzbekistan
Total	24

Event	Qualified individuals
2023 European Artistic Gymnastics Championships (top 24 all-arounders)	(Armenia) Artur Davtyan (Finland) Elias Koski (Lithuania) Robert Tvorogal (Finland) Oskar Kirmes (Norway) Sofus Heggemsnes (Greece) Nikolaos Iliopoulos (Cyprus) Ilias Georgiou (Austria) Ricardo Rudy (Norway) Harald Wibye (Azerbaijan) Ivan Tikhonov (Austria) Ashkab Matiev (Lithuania) Gytis Chasazyrovas (Armenia) Gagik Khachikyan (Poland) Sebastian Gawroński (Republic of Ireland) Adam Steele (Cyprus) Michalis Chari (Portugal) José Nogueira (Poland) Kacper Garnczarek (Serbia) Petar Vefić (Bulgaria) Yordan Aleksandrov (Bulgaria) Kevin Penev (Czech Republic) Daniel Bago (Sweden) Marcus Stenberg (San Marino) Lucca Bertone
Host country reallocation (next top ranked individual at the European Championships)	(Iceland) Valgard Reinhardsson
2023 Oceania Artistic Gymnastics Championships (top 2 all-arounders)	(New Zealand) Mikhail Koudinov (New Zealand) Ethan Dick
2023 Pan American Artistic Gymnastics Championships (top 6 all-arounders)	(Mexico) Isaac Núñez (Chile) Joel Álvarez (Puerto Rico) Josue Perez Gines (Argentina) Santiago Mayol (Mexico) Rodrigo Gómez (Cuba) Diorges Escobar
2023 African Artistic Gymnastics Championships (top 2 all-arounders)	(Algeria) Hillal Metidji (Morocco) Hamza Hossaini
2023 Asian Artistic Gymnastics Championships (top 6 all-arounders)	(Philippines) Carlos Yulo (Vietnam) Văn Vĩ Lương (Chinese Taipei) Yeh Cheng (Chinese Taipei) Lee Chih-kai (Mongolia) Usukhbayar Erkhembayar (India) Yogeshwar Singh
2023 FIG Artistic Gymnastics World Cup series — Floor Exercise (Note: Gymnasts who advanced through the FIG World Cup series route may only compete on the event(s) they have qualified on, per FIG rules.) (top 8 in final standings)	(Republic of Ireland) Dominick Cunningham (Sweden) Filip Lidbeck (Republic of Ireland) Eamon Montgomery (Sweden) Kim Vanströem (Cyprus) Neofytos Kyriakou (Mongolia) Enkhtushin Damdindorj (Portugal) Guilherme Campos (Finland) Akseli Karsikas
2023 FIG Artistic Gymnastics World Cup series — Pommel Horse (top 8 in final standings)	(Republic of Ireland) Rhys McClenaghan (Chinese Taipei) Shiao Yu-jan (Albania) Matvei Petrov (Armenia) Harutyun Merdinyan (Croatia) Filip Ude (Jordan) Ahmad Abu Al-Soud (Latvia) Dmitrijs Mickevičs (Czech Republic) Radomír Sliž
2023 FIG Artistic Gymnastics World Cup series — Still Rings (top 8 in final standings)	(Azerbaijan) Nikita Simonov (Armenia) Artur Avetisyan (Austria) Vinzenz Höck (Greece) Eleftherios Petrounias (Chinese Taipei) Yin Guan-li (Armenia) Vahagn Davtyan (Cyprus) Sokratis Pilakouris (Mexico) Fabián de Luna
2023 FIG Artistic Gymnastics World Cup series — Vault (top 8 in final standings)	(Hong Kong) Shek Wai Hung (Czech Republic) Ondřej Kalný (Chinese Taipei) Tseng Wei-sheng (Republic of Ireland) Dominick Cunningham (Cyprus) Neofytos Kyriakou (Dominican Republic) Audrys Nin Reyes (Philippines) Juancho Miguel Besana (Norway) Sebastian Sponevik
2023 FIG Artistic Gymnastics World Cup series — Parallel Bars (top 8 in final standings)	(Algeria) Ahmed-Riadh Aliouat (Chinese Taipei) Lin Guan-yi (Greece) Stefanos Tsolakidis (Dominican Republic) Audrys Nin Reyes (Latvia) Ričards Plate (Norway) Sebastian Sponevik (Mexico) Fabián de Luna (Luxembourg) Quentin Brandenburger
2023 FIG Artistic Gymnastics World Cup series — High Bar (top 8 in final standings)	(Croatia) Tin Srbić (Serbia) Ivan Dejanović (Cyprus) Neofytos Kyriakou (Cyprus) Marios Georgiou (Latvia) Ričards Plate (Chinese Taipei) Lin Guan-yi (Philippines) Juancho Miguel Besana (Algeria) Ahmed-Riadh Aliouat
Total	88 (40 AA + 48 AS)

=== Women ===
Event	Qualified teams
2022 World Artistic Gymnastics Championships (top 8 teams)	United States (United Kingdom) Great Britain; Canada; Brazil; Italy; China; Japan; France
2023 European Artistic Gymnastics Championships (top 10 teams)	Netherlands; Hungary; Romania; Belgium; Spain; Germany; Sweden; Finland; Austria; Czech Republic
2023 Oceania Artistic Gymnastics Championships (top ranked team)	Australia
2023 Pan American Artistic Gymnastics Championships (top 2 teams)	Mexico; Argentina
2023 African Artistic Gymnastics Championships (top ranked team)	South Africa
2023 Asian Artistic Gymnastics Championships (top 2 teams)	South Korea; Chinese Taipei
Total	24

Event	Qualified individuals
2023 European Artistic Gymnastics Championships (top 23 all-arounders)	(Norway) Maria Tronrud (Slovakia) Barbora Mokošová (Republic of Ireland) Emma Slevin (Ukraine) Anna Lashchevska (Slovenia) Lucija Hribar (Denmark) Camille Rasmussen (Switzerland) Anny Wu (Switzerland) Lena Bickel (Turkey) Sevgi Kayışoğlu (Greece) Athanasia Mesiri (Portugal) Ana Filipa Martins (Slovenia) Zala Trtnik (Iceland) Thelma Aðalsteinsdóttir (Ukraine) Ilona Krupa (Portugal) Mafalda Costa (Republic of Ireland) Halle Hilton (Israel) Lihie Raz (Norway) Mari Kanter (Iceland) Margrét Kristinsdóttir (Turkey) Bengisu Yıldız (Latvia) Valērija Ratiboļska (Poland) Kaja Skalska (Latvia) Anastasija Ananjeva (Monaco) Joana De Freitas
Host spot reallocation (next top ranked individual at the European Championships)	(Luxembourg) Céleste Mordenti
2023 Oceania Artistic Gymnastics Championships (top 2 all-arounders)	(New Zealand) Reece Cobb (New Zealand) Madeleine Marshall
2023 Pan American Artistic Gymnastics Championships (top 11 all-arounders)	(Barbados) Olivia Kelly (Panama) Karla Navas (Colombia) Ginna Escobar Betancur (Ecuador) Alaís Perea (Haiti) Lynnzee Brown (Chile) Makarena Pinto Adasme (Colombia) Yiseth Valenzuela (Chile) Franchesca Santi (Panama) Lana Herrera (Peru) Ana Karina Méndez (Barbados) Anya Pilgram
2023 African Artistic Gymnastics Championships (top 4 all-arounders)	(Algeria) Kaylia Nemour (Egypt) Jana Abdelsalam (Egypt) Sandra Elsadek (Algeria) Lahna Salem
2023 Asian Artistic Gymnastics Championships (top 8 all-arounders)	(Indonesia) Rifda Irfanaluthfi (Philippines) Aleah Finnegan (Uzbekistan) Dildora Aripova (Sri Lanka) Milka Gehani (Kazakhstan) Aida Bauyrzhanova (Singapore) Nadine Joy Nathan (Philippines) Kylee Kvamme (Singapore) Emma Yap
2023 FIG Artistic Gymnastics World Cup series — Vault (top 8 in final standings)	(Kazakhstan) Darya Yassinskaya (Azerbaijan) Nazanin Teymurova (Norway) Julie Erichsen (Panama) Hillary Heron (Latvia) Katrīna Jureviča (Turkey) Bilge Tarhan (Uzbekistan) Gulnaz Jumabekova (Kazakhstan) Amina Khalimarden
2023 FIG Artistic Gymnastics World Cup series — Uneven Bars (top 8 in final standings)	(Ukraine) Yelyzaveta Hubareva (Egypt) Jana Mahmoud (Norway) Julie Erichsen (Greece) Magdalini Tsiori (Malaysia) Zarith Khalid (Panama) Hillary Heron (Indonesia) Ameera Hariadi (Turkey) Derin Tanrıyaşükür
2023 FIG Artistic Gymnastics World Cup series — Balance Beam (top 8 in final standings)	(Azerbaijan) Nazanin Teymurova (Ukraine) Yelyzaveta Hubareva (Norway) Marie Rønbeck (Hong Kong) Angel Hiu Ying Wong (Poland) Marta Pihan-Kulesza (Portugal) Mariana Parente (Croatia) Tina Zelčić (Panama) Hillary Heron
2023 FIG Artistic Gymnastics World Cup series — Floor Exercise (top 8 in final standings)	(Azerbaijan) Nazanin Teymurova (Greece) Elvira Katsali (Panama) Hillary Heron (Kazakhstan) Darya Yassinskaya (Vietnam) Trần Đoàn Quỳnh Nam (Norway) Marie Rønbeck (Portugal) Mariana Parente (Azerbaijan) Samira Gahramanova
Total	81 (49 AA + 32 AS)

=== Team rosters ===
==== Men ====
Qualified team	Gymnasts
Japan	Kenta Chiba; Daiki Hashimoto; Kazuma Kaya; Kazuki Minami; Kaito Sugimoto; Alternate: Teppei Miwa
Great Britain	James Hall; Harry Hepworth; Jake Jarman; Courtney Tulloch; Max Whitlock; Alternate: Luke Whitehouse
United States	Asher Hong; Paul Juda; Yul Moldauer; Fred Richard; Khoi Young; Alternate: Colt Walker
China	Liu Yang; Shi Cong; Su Weide; Sun Wei; You Hao; Alternate: Lin Chaopan
Italy	Yumin Abbadini; Nicola Bartolini; Lorenzo Minh Casali; Matteo Levantesi; Mario Macchiati; Alternate: Lorenzo Bonicelli
Spain	Néstor Abad; Thierno Diallo; Nicolau Mir; Joel Plata; Rayderley Zapata; Alternate: Adriá Vera
Brazil	Yuri Guimarães; Arthur Mariano; Bernardo Miranda; Patrick Sampaio; Diogo Soares; Alternate: Arthur Zanetti
South Korea	Kim Jae-ho; Lee Jung-hyo; Lee Jun-ho; Ryu Sung-hyun; Seo Jung-won; Alternate: Kan Hyun-bae
Turkey	Ferhat Arıcan; Adem Asil; Emre Dodanli; Mehmet Ayberk Kosak; Ahmet Önder; Alternate: Kerem Şener
Switzerland	Christian Baumann; Luca Giubellini; Florian Langenegger; Noe Seifert; Taha Serhani
Germany	Pascal Brendel; Lukas Dauser; Nils Dunkel; Nick Klessing; Lucas Kochan; Alternate: Andreas Toba
France	Kevin Carvalho; Lucas Desanges; Benjamin Osberger; Léo Saladino; Jim Zona; Alternate: Cameron-Lie Bernard
Belgium	Nicola Cuyle; Glen Cuyle; Maxime Gentges; Noah Kuavita; Luka van den Keybus; Alternate: Victor Martinez
Ukraine	Nazar Chepurnyi; Illia Kovtun; Igor Radivilov; Radomyr Stelmakh; Oleg Verniaiev; Alternate: Pantely Kolodii
Hungary	Krisztián Balázs; Balázs Kiss; Krisztofer Mészáros; Botond Molnár; Benedek Tomcsányi; Alternate: Szabolcs Bátori
Romania	Robert Burtănete; Roland Modoianu; Andrei Muntean; Emilian Neagu; Nicholas Tarca; Alternate: Gabriel Burtănete
Netherlands	Loran de Munck; Bart Deurloo; Jermain Grünberg; Jordi Hagenaar; Casimir Schmidt; Alternate: Martijn de Veer
Israel	Artem Dolgopyat; Pavel Gulidov; Ilia Liubimov; Alexander Myakinin; Uri Zeidel; Alternate: Eliran Ioscovich
Australia	Tyson Bull; James Hardy; Clay Mason Stephens; Mitchell Morgans; Vedant Sawant; Alternate: Jesse Moore
Egypt	Ahmed Abdelrahman; Mohamed Afify; Ahmed Elmaraghy; Zaid Khater; Omar Mohamed; Alternate: Abdelrahman Mahmoud
Colombia	Dilan Jiménez; Juan Larrahondo; José Martínez; Andrés Martínez; Sergio Vargas
Canada	Zachary Clay; René Cournoyer; Félix Dolci; William Émard; Jayson Rampersad; Alternate: Ioannis Chronopoulos
Kazakhstan	Ilyas Azizov; Milad Karimi; Nariman Kurbanov; Dmitriy Patanin; Diyas Toishybek; Alternate: Emil Akhmejanov
Uzbekistan	Rasuljon Abdurakhimov; Abdulla Azimov; Khabibullo Ergashev; Utkirbek Juraev; Abdulaziz Mirvaliev

==== Women ====
Qualified team	Gymnasts
United States	Simone Biles; Skye Blakely; Shilese Jones; Joscelyn Roberson; Leanne Wong; Alternate: Kayla DiCello
Great Britain	Ondine Achampong; Ruby Evans; Georgia-Mae Fenton; Jessica Gadirova; Alice Kinsella; Alternate: Poppy-Grace Stickler
Canada	Ellie Black; Cassie Lee; Ava Stewart; Aurélie Tran; Rose-Kaying Woo; Alternate: Frédérique Sgarbossa
Brazil	Rebeca Andrade; Jade Barbosa; Lorrane Oliveira; Flávia Saraiva; Júlia Soares; Alternate: Carolyne Pedro
Italy	Angela Andreoli; Arianna Belardelli; Alice D'Amato; Manila Esposito; Elisa Iorio; Alternate: Veronica Mandriota
China	Huang Zhuofan; Ou Yushan; Qiu Qiyuan; Zhang Qingying; Zhou Yaqin; Alternate: Wu Ran
Japan	Urara Ashikawa; Kokoro Fukasawa; Hatakeda Chiaki; Kishi Rina; Shoko Miyata; Alternate: Ayaka Sakaguchi
France	Marine Boyer; Lorette Charpy; Mélanie de Jesus dos Santos; Coline Devillard; Morgane Osyssek-Reimer; Alternate: Djenna Laroui
Netherlands	Eythora Thorsdottir; Vera van Pol; Sanna Veerman; Naomi Visser; Sanne Wevers; Alternate: Tisha Volleman
Hungary	Csenge Bácskay; Lili Czifra; Gréta Mayer; Zója Székely; Nikolett Szilágyi
Romania	Ana Bărbosu; Lilia Cosman; Amalia Ghigoarță; Andreea Preda; Sabrina Voinea; Alternate: Ella Oprea
Belgium	Maellyse Brassart; Fien Enghels; Erika Pinxten; Yléa Tollet; Jutta Verkest; Alternate: Margaux Dandois
Spain	Laura Casabuena; Laia Font; Ana Pérez; Alba Petisco; Sara Pinilla; Alternate: Laia Masferrer
Germany	Meolie Jauch; Lea Marie Quaas; Pauline Schäfer; Karina Schönmaier; Sarah Voss; Alternate: Anna-Lena König
Sweden	Alva Eriksson; Elina Grawin; Tonya Paulsson; Emelie Westlund; Jennifer Williams; Alternate: Maya Ståhl
Finland	Misella Antila; Malla Montell; Adeliina Siikala; Kaia Tanskanen; Olivia Vättö; Alternate: Ada Hautala
Austria	Leni Bohle; Bianca Frysak; Selina Kickinger; Carina Kröll; Charlize Mörz; Alternate: Jasmin Mader or Elisa Hämmerle
Czech Republic	Sona Artamonova; Klara Peterkova; Dominika Ponizilova; Lucie Trnkova; Alice Vlkova
Australia	Georgia Godwin; Kate McDonald; Ruby Pass; Breanna Scott; Emily Whitehead; Alternate: Macy Pegoli
South Africa	Caleigh Anders; Naveen Daries; Shanté Koti; Garcelle Napier; Caitlin Rooskrantz
Mexico	Paulina Campos; Natalia Escalera; Cassandra Loustalot; Alexa Moreno; Ahtziri Sandoval; Alternate: Greys Briceño
Argentina	Brisa Carraro; Milagros Curti; Lucila Estarli; Nicole Iribarne; Leila Martinez
South Korea	Eom Do-hyun; Lee Da-yeong; Lee Yun-seo; Shin Sol-yi; Yeo Seo-jeong
Chinese Taipei	Lai Pin-ju; Liao Yi-chun; Lin Yi-chen; Ting Hua-tien; Wu Sing-fen; Alternate: Huang Tzu-hsing

== Competition schedule ==
Date	Session	Time	Subdivisions
Saturday, 30 September	Men's Qualification	10:00 AM	MAG: Subdivision 1 Turkey, All Around Group 3, Great Britain, Kazakhstan, Brazil, All Around Group 8
Saturday, 30 September	Men's Qualification	12:15 PM	MAG: Subdivision 2 Apparatus Specialists Group 1, Israel, Japan, Ukraine, Belgium, Apparatus Specialists Group 2
Saturday, 30 September	Men's Qualification	4:00 PM	MAG: Subdivision 3 Australia, United States, All Around Group 6, All Around Group 5, Uzbekistan, Romania
Saturday, 30 September	Men's Qualification	6:15 PM	MAG: Subdivision 4 Spain, All Around Group 4, Netherlands, China, All Around Group 10, Germany
Sunday, 1 October	Men's Qualification	10:00 AM	MAG: Subdivision 5 Egypt, Canada, All Around Group 9, Colombia, Switzerland, All Around Group 7
Sunday, 1 October	Men's Qualification	12:15 PM	MAG: Subdivision 6 Italy, South Korea, France, All Around Group 1, All Around Group 2, Hungary
Sunday, 1 October	Women's Qualification	4:00 PM	WAG: Subdivision 1 Italy, Netherlands, Apparatus Specialists Group 2, Apparatus Specialists Group 1
Sunday, 1 October	Women's Qualification	5:45 PM	WAG: Subdivision 2 Chinese Taipei, United States, All Around Group 4, All Around Group 7
Sunday, 1 October	Women's Qualification	7:30 PM	WAG: Subdivision 3 All Around Group 2, Great Britain, South Korea, South Africa
Monday, 2 October	Women's Qualification	10:00 AM	WAG: Subdivision 4 All Around Group 1, Spain, Belgium, Romania
Monday, 2 October	Women's Qualification	11:30 AM	WAG: Subdivision 5 Mexico, All Around Group 9, Sweden, All Around Group 3
Monday, 2 October	Women's Qualification	1:00 PM	WAG: Subdivision 6 All Around Group 6, Australia, Brazil, All Around Group 12
Monday, 2 October	Women's Qualification	4:15 PM	WAG: Subdivision 7 All Around Group 10, Austria, All Around Group 5, Canada
Monday, 2 October	Women's Qualification	5:45 PM	WAG: Subdivision 8 Germany, Hungary, Finland, All Around Group 13
Monday, 2 October	Women's Qualification	7:45 PM	WAG: Subdivision 9 Japan, Czech Republic, Argentina, All Around Group 8
Monday, 2 October	Women's Qualification	9:15 PM	WAG: Subdivision 10; France, All Around Group 14, All Around Group 11, China
Tuesday, 3 October	Men's Team Final	7:30 PM	Top 8 from qualification
Wednesday, 4 October	Women's Team Final	7:30 PM	Top 8 from qualification
Thursday, 5 October	Men's Individual All-Around Final	7:30 PM	Top 24 from qualification
Friday, 6 October	Women's Individual All-Around Final	7:30 PM	Top 24 from qualification
Saturday, 7 October	Apparatus Finals	2:00 PM	MAG: Floor, Pommel horse, Rings
Saturday, 7 October	Apparatus Finals	2:00 PM	WAG: Vault, Uneven bars
Sunday, 8 October	Apparatus Finals	2:00 PM	MAG: Vault, Parallel bars, Horizontal bar
Sunday, 8 October	Apparatus Finals	2:00 PM	WAG: Balance beam, Floor
Listed in local time (UTC+02:00).

== Medal summary ==
=== Medalists ===
Names italicised denote the team alternate.

Event	Gold	Silver	Bronze
Men
Team	Japan; Kenta Chiba; Daiki Hashimoto; Kazuma Kaya; Kazuki Minami; Kaito Sugimoto; Teppei Miwa	China; Lin Chaopan; Liu Yang; Su Weide; Sun Wei; You Hao; Shi Cong	United States; Asher Hong; Paul Juda; Yul Moldauer; Fred Richard; Khoi Young; Colt Walker
Individual all-around	(Japan) Daiki Hashimoto	(Ukraine) Illia Kovtun	(United States) Fred Richard
Floor	(Israel) Artem Dolgopyat	(Japan) Kazuki Minami	(Kazakhstan) Milad Karimi
Pommel horse	(Republic of Ireland) Rhys McClenaghan	(United States) Khoi Young	(Jordan) Ahmad Abu Al-Soud
Rings	(China) Liu Yang	(Greece) Eleftherios Petrounias	(China) You Hao
Vault	(United Kingdom) Jake Jarman	(United States) Khoi Young	(Ukraine) Nazar Chepurnyi
Parallel bars	(Germany) Lukas Dauser	(China) Shi Cong	(Japan) Kaito Sugimoto
Horizontal bar	(Japan) Daiki Hashimoto	(Croatia) Tin Srbić	(China) Su Weide
Women
Team	United States; Simone Biles; Skye Blakely; Shilese Jones; Joscelyn Roberson; Leanne Wong; Kayla DiCello	Brazil; Rebeca Andrade; Jade Barbosa; Lorrane Oliveira; Flávia Saraiva; Júlia Soares; Carolyne Pedro	France; Marine Boyer; Lorette Charpy; Mélanie de Jesus dos Santos; Coline Devillard; Morgane Osyssek; Djenna Laroui
Individual all-around	(United States) Simone Biles	(Brazil) Rebeca Andrade	(United States) Shilese Jones
Vault	(Brazil) Rebeca Andrade	(United States) Simone Biles	(South Korea) Yeo Seo-jeong
Uneven bars	(China) Qiu Qiyuan	(Algeria) Kaylia Nemour	(United States) Shilese Jones
Balance beam	(United States) Simone Biles	(China) Zhou Yaqin	(Brazil) Rebeca Andrade
Floor	(United States) Simone Biles	(Brazil) Rebeca Andrade	(Brazil) Flávia Saraiva

=== Medal standings ===
==== Overall ====
* Host nation (Belgium)

Rank	Nation	Gold	Silver	Bronze	Total
1	United States	4	3	4	11
2	Japan	3	1	1	5
3	China	2	3	2	7
4	Brazil	1	3	2	6
5	Germany	1	0	0	1
5	Great Britain	1	0	0	1
5	Ireland	1	0	0	1
5	Israel	1	0	0	1
9	Ukraine	0	1	1	2
10	Algeria	0	1	0	1
10	Croatia	0	1	0	1
10	Greece	0	1	0	1
13	France	0	0	1	1
13	Jordan	0	0	1	1
13	Kazakhstan	0	0	1	1
13	South Korea	0	0	1	1
Totals (16 entries)		14	14	14	42

==== Men ====
* Host nation (Belgium)

Rank	Nation	Gold	Silver	Bronze	Total
1	Japan	3	1	1	5
2	China	1	2	2	5
3	Germany	1	0	0	1
3	Great Britain	1	0	0	1
3	Ireland	1	0	0	1
3	Israel	1	0	0	1
7	United States	0	2	2	4
8	Ukraine	0	1	1	2
9	Croatia	0	1	0	1
9	Greece	0	1	0	1
11	Jordan	0	0	1	1
11	Kazakhstan	0	0	1	1
Totals (12 entries)		8	8	8	24

==== Women ====
* Host nation (Belgium)

Rank	Nation	Gold	Silver	Bronze	Total
1	United States	4	1	2	7
2	Brazil	1	3	2	6
3	China	1	1	0	2
4	Algeria	0	1	0	1
5	France	0	0	1	1
5	South Korea	0	0	1	1
Totals (6 entries)		6	6	6	18

== Men's results ==
=== Team ===
Rank	Team	Floor (gymnastics)	Pommel horse	Rings (gymnastics)	Vault (gymnastics)	Parallel bars	Horizontal bar	Total
1st place, gold medalist(s)	Japan	41.666 (4)	41.532 (1)	41.499 (3)	44.533 (2)	44.432 (1)	41.932 (1)	255.594
1st place, gold medalist(s)	Kenta Chiba	12.933	13.066	13.766			13.566	255.594
1st place, gold medalist(s)	Daiki Hashimoto	14.300	14.266		14.900	14.866	14.366	255.594
1st place, gold medalist(s)	Kazuma Kaya		14.200	14.033	14.633	14.733	14.000	255.594
1st place, gold medalist(s)	Kazuki Minami	14.433			15.000			255.594
1st place, gold medalist(s)	Kaito Sugimoto			13.700		14.833		255.594
2nd place, silver medalist(s)	China	41.933 (3)	40.866 (2)	43.832 (1)	43.299 (4)	44.365 (2)	39.499 (5)	253.794
2nd place, silver medalist(s)	Liu Yang			15.000				253.794
2nd place, silver medalist(s)	Su Weide	14.100			14.700		11.166	253.794
2nd place, silver medalist(s)	Sun Wei	14.033	14.266	13.966	14.866	14.733	14.200	253.794
2nd place, silver medalist(s)	Lin Chaopan	13.800	13.200		13.733	14.666	14.133	253.794
2nd place, silver medalist(s)	You Hao		13.400	14.866		14.966		253.794
3rd place, bronze medalist(s)	United States	42.698 (1)	39.633 (6)	41.466 (4)	44.166 (3)	43.166 (3)	41.299 (3)	252.428
3rd place, bronze medalist(s)	Asher Hong	13.966		14.000	15.100	14.200		252.428
3rd place, bronze medalist(s)	Paul Juda			13.600	14.400		13.933	252.428
3rd place, bronze medalist(s)	Yul Moldauer	14.366	13.533	13.866		14.933		252.428
3rd place, bronze medalist(s)	Fred Richard	14.366	12.500			14.033	14.533	252.428
3rd place, bronze medalist(s)	Khoi Young		13.600		14.666		12.833	252.428
4	Great Britain	41.299 (6)	40.432 (4)	41.666 (2)	44.599 (1)	42.432 (4)	39.033 (7)	249.461
4	James Hall	13.966	11.933	13.466		14.466	12.433	249.461
4	Harry Hepworth	12.800		14.100	14.866			249.461
4	Jake Jarman	14.533	13.233		15.400	14.166	13.200	249.461
4	Courtney Tulloch			14.100	14.333			249.461
4	Max Whitlock		15.266			13.800	13.400	249.461
5	Switzerland	39.399 (8)	40.165 (5)	39.899 (7)	42.299 (7)	41.232 (6)	41.432 (2)	244.426
5	Christian Baumann			13.566		14.133	13.866	244.426
5	Luca Giubellini	12.033	13.166		14.433			244.426
5	Florian Langenegger	13.766	13.433	13.000	14.233			244.426
5	Noe Seifert	13.600	13.566	13.333		14.033	13.800	244.426
5	Taha Serhani				13.633	13.066	13.766	244.426
6	Germany	41.466 (5)	40.532 (3)	40.332 (6)	41.432 (8)	41.198 (7)	39.066 (6)	244.026
6	Pascal Brendel	14.000	13.566	12.766	14.100	13.566	13.800	244.026
6	Lukas Dauser					15.366	13.266	244.026
6	Nils Dunkel		13.466	13.700				244.026
6	Nick Klessing	14.100		13.866	12.966			244.026
6	Lucas Kochan	13.366	13.500		14.366	12.266	12.000	244.026
7	Canada	40.166 (7)	39.066 (7)	41.066 (5)	42.766 (6)	41.799 (5)	38.165 (8)	243.028
7	Zachary Clay		14.200					243.028
7	René Cournoyer	12.600	11.033	13.533	14.400	13.666	13.866	243.028
7	Félix Dolci	14.033		13.733	14.333	14.100	14.033	243.028
7	William Émard	13.533		13.800	14.033	14.033	10.266	243.028
7	Jayson Rampersad		13.833					243.028
8	Italy	41.999 (2)	36.499 (8)	39.899 (7)	43.299 (4)	39.432 (8)	40.032 (4)	241.160
8	Yumin Abbadini	13.900	12.733	13.266			14.033	241.160
8	Nicola Bartolini	14.033	13.133		14.566			241.160
8	Lorenzo Minh Casali	14.066		13.500	14.400	12.900		241.160
8	Matteo Levantesi					12.366	13.166	241.160
8	Mario Macchiati		10.633	13.133	14.333	14.166	12.833	241.160

=== Individual all-around ===
Rank	Gymnast	Floor (gymnastics)	Pommel horse	Rings (gymnastics)	Vault (gymnastics)	Parallel bars	Horizontal bar	Total
1st place, gold medalist(s)	(Japan) Daiki Hashimoto	13.466	14.366	14.000	15.000	14.800	14.500	86.132
2nd place, silver medalist(s)	(Ukraine) Illia Kovtun	14.000	14.300	13.133	14.333	15.166	14.066	84.998
3rd place, bronze medalist(s)	(United States) Fred Richard	14.633	13.733	13.500	14.566	14.600	13.300	84.332
4	(Japan) Kenta Chiba	13.966	14.800	13.733	13.666	14.666	12.633	83.464
5	(Kazakhstan) Milad Karimi	14.366	13.000	12.966	14.233	14.100	14.266	82.931
6	(Italy) Yumin Abbadini	13.866	13.800	13.300	13.900	13.933	14.033	82.832
7	(China) Sun Wei	13.333	12.300	14.266	14.166	14.400	14.233	82.698
8	(Switzerland) Noe Seifert	13.833	13.566	13.366	14.100	14.766	12.800	82.431
9	(United Kingdom) James Hall	13.600	13.300	13.566	13.733	14.666	13.466	82.331
10	(Brazil) Diogo Soares	13.000	13.600	13.066	14.100	14.266	13.800	81.832
11	(Hungary) Krisztofer Mészáros	14.266	13.500	13.366	14.300	12.533	13.700	81.665
12	(Canada) René Cournoyer	13.566	12.600	13.766	13.700	13.933	13.800	81.365
13	(United Kingdom) Jake Jarman	14.500	13.433	12.900	15.433	12.766	12.166	81.198
14	(Switzerland) Florian Langenegger	13.433	13.466	12.900	14.233	13.866	13.033	80.931
15	(Italy) Mario Macchiati	13.466	13.433	13.100	14.466	13.200	13.000	80.665
16	(Germany) Lukas Dauser	11.966	13.033	12.933	13.733	15.400	13.366	80.431
17	(Netherlands) Casimir Schmidt	14.000	13.266	12.800	14.300	12.933	13.000	80.299
18	(Israel) Ilia Liubimov	13.200	13.700	12.400	13.966	13.533	13.366	80.165
19	(United States) Asher Hong	13.733	12.333	13.833	13.866	14.466	11.833	80.064
20	(Spain) Thierno Diallo	13.366	13.300	13.000	14.133	13.833	12.300	79.932
21	(Belgium) Luka van den Keybus	13.600	9.666	12.900	14.500	14.200	13.500	78.366
22	(Turkey) Ahmet Önder	13.800	9.933	13.133	14.533	12.866	14.066	78.331
23	(South Korea) Lee Jun-ho	13.466	11.933	13.166	14.100	11.733	13.566	77.964
24	(Uzbekistan) Khabibullo Ergashev	12.800	13.500	12.266	13.866	13.166	11.733	77.331

- (Japan) Kazuma Kaya withdrew and was replaced by his compatriot (Japan) Daiki Hashimoto who had not qualified due to the two-per-country rule.
- (Italy) Lorenzo Minh Casali withdrew and was replaced by his compatriot (Italy) Mario Macchiati who had not qualified due to the two-per-country rule.
- (Israel) Artem Dolgopyat withdrew and was replaced by second reserve (Spain) Thierno Diallo.
- (Armenia) Artur Davtyan withdrew and was replaced by third reserve (Belgium) Luka van den Keybus.
- (Turkey) Adem Asil withdrew and was replaced by fourth reserve (Romania) Andrei Muntean.
- First and fourth reserve (Spain) Néstor Abad and (Romania) Muntean, respectively, withdrew.
- (Uzbekistan) Khabibullo Ergashev, as the next highest scoring competitor, was called up after the fourth reserve withdrew.

=== Floor ===
Rank	Gymnast	D Score	E Score	Pen.	Total
1st place, gold medalist(s)	(Israel) Artem Dolgopyat	6.400	8.466		14.866
2nd place, silver medalist(s)	(Japan) Kazuki Minami	6.500	8.166		14.666
3rd place, bronze medalist(s)	(Kazakhstan) Milad Karimi	6.300	8.300		14.600
4	(Philippines) Carlos Yulo	6.300	8.200		14.500
5	(Canada) Félix Dolci	6.000	8.400		14.400
6	(United Kingdom) Harry Hepworth	6.400	8.166	-0.20	14.333
7	(Japan) Daiki Hashimoto	6.000	8.333	-0.10	14.233
8	(United States) Fred Richard	6.000	7.200		13.200

=== Pommel horse ===
Rank	Gymnast	D Score	E Score	Pen.	Total
1st place, gold medalist(s)	(Republic of Ireland) Rhys McClenaghan	6.400	8.700		15.100
2nd place, silver medalist(s)	(United States) Khoi Young	6.500	8.466		14.966
3rd place, bronze medalist(s)	(Jordan) Ahmad Abu Al-Soud	6.400	8.233		14.633
4	(Armenia) Harutyun Merdinyan	6.000	8.600		14.600
5	(United Kingdom) Max Whitlock	6.900	7.400		14.300
6	(Japan) Kenta Chiba	6.100	8.100		14.200
7	(Germany) Nils Dunkel	6.200	7.566		13.766
8	(Chinese Taipei) Lee Chih-kai	6.500	7.000		13.500

=== Rings ===
Rank	Gymnast	D Score	E Score	Pen.	Total
1st place, gold medalist(s)	(China) Liu Yang	6.400	8.833		15.233
2nd place, silver medalist(s)	(Greece) Eleftherios Petrounias	6.300	8.766		15.066
3rd place, bronze medalist(s)	(China) You Hao	6.700	8.133		14.833
4	(Armenia) Vahagn Davtyan	6.000	8.700		14.700
5	(Azerbaijan) Nikita Simonov	6.200	8.466		14.666
6	(Austria) Vinzenz Höck	6.100	8.466		14.566
7	(Armenia) Artur Avetisyan	5.900	8.533		14.433
8	(United Kingdom) Harry Hepworth	5.800	8.300		14.100

=== Vault ===
Rank	Gymnast	Vault 1				Vault 2				Total
Rank	Gymnast	D Score	E Score	Pen.	Score 1	D Score	E Score	Pen.	Score 2	Total
1st place, gold medalist(s)	(United Kingdom) Jake Jarman	6.000	9.400		15.400	5.600	9.100		14.700	15.050
2nd place, silver medalist(s)	(United States) Khoi Young	5.600	9.433		15.033	5.400	9.266		14.666	14.849
3rd place, bronze medalist(s)	(Ukraine) Nazar Chepurnyi	5.600	9.233		14.833	5.600	9.200	-0.10	14.700	14.766
4	(Ukraine) Igor Radivilov	5.600	9.300		14.900	5.600	9.000		14.600	14.750
5	(United States) Paul Juda	5.600	9.100	-0.10	14.600	5.200	9.300		14.500	14.550
6	(Armenia) Artur Davtyan	5.600	8.666	-0.30	13.966	5.600	9.533		15.133	14.549
7	(United Kingdom) Harry Hepworth	5.600	9.033	-0.10	14.533	5.600	9.033	-0.30	14.333	14.433
8	(Bulgaria) Kevin Penev	5.200	8.966		14.166	5.200	9.300	-0.30	14.200	14.183

=== Parallel bars ===
Rank	Gymnast	D Score	E Score	Pen.	Total
1st place, gold medalist(s)	(Germany) Lukas Dauser	6.600	8.800		15.400
2nd place, silver medalist(s)	(China) Shi Cong	6.300	8.766		15.066
3rd place, bronze medalist(s)	(Japan) Kaito Sugimoto	6.300	8.700		15.000
4	(Japan) Kazuma Kaya	6.300	8.433		14.733
5	(Ukraine) Illia Kovtun	6.400	8.233		14.633
6	(United States) Asher Hong	6.000	8.466		14.466
7	(Italy) Matteo Levantesi	6.400	7.466		13.866
8	(United States) Yul Moldauer	6.300	6.833		13.133

=== Horizontal bar ===
Rank	Gymnast	D Score	E Score	Pen.	Total
1st place, gold medalist(s)	(Japan) Daiki Hashimoto	6.700	8.533		15.233
2nd place, silver medalist(s)	(Croatia) Tin Srbić	6.100	8.600		14.700
3rd place, bronze medalist(s)	(China) Su Weide	5.900	8.600		14.500
4	(Kazakhstan) Milad Karimi	6.300	8.133		14.433
5	(United States) Paul Juda	5.400	8.700		14.100
6	(Brazil) Arthur Mariano	6.200	7.333		13.533
7	(Japan) Kenta Chiba	5.400	7.300		12.700
8	(Canada) Félix Dolci	5.000	6.100		11.100

== Women's results ==
=== Team ===
Rank	Team	Vault (gymnastics)	Uneven bars	Balance beam	Floor (gymnastics)	Total
1st place, gold medalist(s)	United States	42.966 (1)	43.265 (1)	39.600 (6)	41.898 (2)	167.729
1st place, gold medalist(s)	Simone Biles	14.800	14.466	14.300	15.166	167.729
1st place, gold medalist(s)	Skye Blakely		14.166			167.729
1st place, gold medalist(s)	Shilese Jones	14.100	14.633	13.600	13.566	167.729
1st place, gold medalist(s)	Joscelyn Roberson					167.729
1st place, gold medalist(s)	Leanne Wong	14.066		11.700	13.166	167.729
2nd place, silver medalist(s)	Brazil	42.666 (2)	41.299 (5)	39.399 (8)	42.166 (1)	165.530
2nd place, silver medalist(s)	Rebeca Andrade	14.900	14.400	13.133	14.666	165.530
2nd place, silver medalist(s)	Jade Barbosa	13.933				165.530
2nd place, silver medalist(s)	Lorrane Oliveira		13.166			165.530
2nd place, silver medalist(s)	Flávia Saraiva	13.833	13.733	14.066	13.900	165.530
2nd place, silver medalist(s)	Júlia Soares			12.200	13.600	165.530
3rd place, bronze medalist(s)	France	41.966 (3)	41.399 (3)	41.066 (2)	39.633 (5)	164.064
3rd place, bronze medalist(s)	Marine Boyer	13.266	12.866	13.733	12.633	164.064
3rd place, bronze medalist(s)	Lorette Charpy		14.133			164.064
3rd place, bronze medalist(s)	Mélanie de Jesus dos Santos	14.400	14.400	14.000	13.700	164.064
3rd place, bronze medalist(s)	Coline Devillard	14.300				164.064
3rd place, bronze medalist(s)	Morgane Osyssek-Reimer			13.333	13.300	164.064
4	China	39.099 (8)	43.032 (2)	41.732 (1)	39.299 (6)	163.162
4	Huang Zhuofan		14.533			163.162
4	Ou Yushan		13.766	13.933	12.066	163.162
4	Qiu Qiyuan	13.100	14.733		13.400	163.162
4	Zhang Qingying	13.166		13.266		163.162
4	Zhou Yaqin	12.833		14.533	13.833	163.162
5	Italy	41.632 (4)	40.633 (6)	40.666 (4)	40.066 (4)	162.997
5	Angela Andreoli			13.033		162.997
5	Arianna Belardelli	13.766			13.133	162.997
5	Alice D'Amato	14.166	13.200		13.300	162.997
5	Manila Esposito	13.700	13.400	14.133	13.633	162.997
5	Elisa Iorio		14.033	13.500		162.997
6	Great Britain	41.166 (5)	39.633 (7)	39.666 (5)	41.399 (3)	161.864
6	Ondine Achampong	14.166		13.933		161.864
6	Ruby Evans	14.000			13.233	161.864
6	Georgia-Mae Fenton		12.400	12.200		161.864
6	Jessica Gadirova	13.000	13.700	13.533	14.533	161.864
6	Alice Kinsella		13.533		13.633	161.864
7	Netherlands	40.166 (6)	41.332 (4)	39.532 (7)	38.533 (7)	159.563
7	Eythora Thorsdottir	13.700	13.266	13.633	13.300	159.563
7	Vera van Pol	13.400			12.900	159.563
7	Sanna Veerman	13.066	13.833			159.563
7	Naomi Visser		14.233	12.966	12.333	159.563
7	Sanne Wevers			12.933		159.563
8	Japan	39.500 (7)	39.399 (8)	40.765 (3)	37.832 (8)	157.496
8	Urara Ashikawa			13.766		157.496
8	Kokoro Fukasawa		13.333			157.496
8	Chiaki Hatakeda	11.800	12.866		12.866	157.496
8	Rina Kishi	13.900		13.433	12.833	157.496
8	Shoko Miyata	13.800	13.200	13.566	12.133	157.496

=== Individual all-around ===
Rank	Gymnast	Vault (gymnastics)	Uneven bars	Balance beam	Floor (gymnastics)	Total
1st place, gold medalist(s)	(United States) Simone Biles	15.100	14.333	14.433	14.533	58.399
2nd place, silver medalist(s)	(Brazil) Rebeca Andrade	14.700	14.500	13.500	14.066	56.766
3rd place, bronze medalist(s)	(United States) Shilese Jones	14.233	14.633	14.066	13.400	56.332
4	(China) Qiu Qiyuan	13.200	14.700	13.733	13.166	54.799
5	(Italy) Alice D'Amato	13.933	14.666	13.166	12.500	54.265
6	(Netherlands) Eythora Thorsdottir	13.833	13.433	13.566	13.266	54.098
7	(United Kingdom) Alice Kinsella	13.766	13.600	13.433	13.233	54.032
8	(Algeria) Kaylia Nemour	12.766	15.200	13.300	12.700	53.966
9	(Italy) Manila Esposito	13.766	14.166	12.866	13.100	53.898
10	(France) Mélanie de Jesus dos Santos	14.066	12.500	13.466	13.833	53.865
11	(Japan) Rina Kishi	13.800	12.966	13.533	12.900	53.199
12	(Netherlands) Naomi Visser	13.133	14.266	12.200	13.533	53.132
13	(United Kingdom) Ondine Achampong	14.133	12.533	13.600	12.700	52.966
14	(France) Morgane Osyssek-Reimer	13.200	13.100	13.366	13.133	52.799
15	(Brazil) Flávia Saraiva	13.833	12.633	14.033	12.200	52.699
16	(Canada) Ellie Black	14.000	12.133	12.933	12.900	51.966
17	(Japan) Chiaki Hatakeda	12.966	13.166	13.133	12.600	51.865
18	(Mexico) Alexa Moreno	13.966	12.966	12.600	12.233	51.765
19	(South Korea) Lee Yun-seo	12.733	13.766	12.333	12.900	51.732
20	(Australia) Georgia Godwin	13.600	13.500	12.266	12.333	51.699
21	(Portugal) Filipa Martins	12.866	13.433	12.566	12.733	51.598
22	(Germany) Sarah Voss	13.400	10.900	13.166	13.333	50.799
23	(Romania) Ana Bărbosu	13.366	11.666	13.533	11.600	50.165
24	(Germany) Pauline Schäfer	12.733	12.933	13.566	10.700	49.932

- (United Kingdom) Jessica Gadirova withdrew and was replaced by her compatriot (United Kingdom) Alice Kinsella who had not qualified due to the two-per-country rule.
- (China) Ou Yushan withdrew and was replaced by first reserve (France) Morgane Osyssek-Reimer.

=== Vault ===
Rank	Gymnast	Vault 1				Vault 2				Total
Rank	Gymnast	D Score	E Score	Pen.	Score 1	D Score	E Score	Pen.	Score 2	Total
1st place, gold medalist(s)	(Brazil) Rebeca Andrade	5.600	9.400		15.000	5.000	9.500		14.500	14.750
2nd place, silver medalist(s)	(United States) Simone Biles	6.400	8.533	-0.50	14.433	5.600	9.066		14.666	14.549
3rd place, bronze medalist(s)	(South Korea) Yeo Seo-jeong	5.400	9.200		14.600	5.000	9.233		14.233	14.416
4	(Mexico) Alexa Moreno	5.400	8.900		14.300	5.200	8.833		14.033	14.166
5	(Canada) Ellie Black	5.000	9.000		14.000	4.800	9.066		13.866	13.933
6	(Japan) Shoko Miyata	5.000	9.066		14.066	4.800	8.933		13.733	13.899
7	(United States) Leanne Wong	5.000	9.100		14.100	4.200	8.733	-0.10	12.833	13.466
8	(Hungary) Csenge Bácskay	4.600	8.800		13.400	4.400	8.733		13.133	13.266
9	(France) Coline Devillard	5.400	7.800		13.200	4.200	8.966		13.166	13.183

- (United States) Joscelyn Roberson withdrew and was replaced by first reserve (Canada) Ellie Black.
- (United Kingdom) Jessica Gadirova withdrew and was replaced by second reserve (Hungary) Csenge Bácskay.
- (United States) Leanne Wong was added to the start list as the ninth competitor after filing an appeal to the FIG regarding the two per country rule, following Bácskay's inclusion in the final.

=== Uneven bars ===
Nemour won the first-ever medal for Algeria at the World Artistic Gymnastics Championships.

Rank	Gymnast	D Score	E Score	Pen.	Total
1st place, gold medalist(s)	(China) Qiu Qiyuan	6.700	8.400		15.100
2nd place, silver medalist(s)	(Algeria) Kaylia Nemour	6.700	8.333		15.033
3rd place, bronze medalist(s)	(United States) Shilese Jones	6.300	8.466		14.766
4	(China) Huang Zhuofan	6.500	8.266		14.766
5	(United States) Simone Biles	6.000	8.200		14.200
6	(Netherlands) Sanna Veerman	6.200	8.000		14.200
7	(Netherlands) Naomi Visser	6.000	8.166		14.166
8	(Canada) Ellie Black	5.700	8.100		13.800
9	(France) Lorette Charpy	6.100	6.833		12.933

=== Balance beam ===
Rank	Gymnast	D Score	E Score	Pen.	Total
1st place, gold medalist(s)	(United States) Simone Biles	6.500	8.300		14.800
2nd place, silver medalist(s)	(China) Zhou Yaqin	6.500	8.200		14.700
3rd place, bronze medalist(s)	(Brazil) Rebeca Andrade	6.000	8.300		14.300
4	(Netherlands) Sanne Wevers	5.900	8.200		14.100
5	(Japan) Urara Ashikawa	5.900	8.166		14.066
6	(China) Zhang Qingying	6.200	6.900		13.100
7	(United States) Shilese Jones	5.600	7.333		12.933
8	(Germany) Pauline Schäfer	5.400	7.500	-0.1	12.800

- (United Kingdom) Jessica Gadirova withdrew and was replaced by first reserve (Netherlands) Sanne Wevers.

=== Floor ===
Rank	Gymnast	D Score	E Score	Pen.	Total
1st place, gold medalist(s)	(United States) Simone Biles	6.700	8.033	-0.10	14.633
2nd place, silver medalist(s)	(Brazil) Rebeca Andrade	6.100	8.400		14.500
3rd place, bronze medalist(s)	(Brazil) Flávia Saraiva	5.700	8.266		13.966
4	(Romania) Sabrina Voinea	6.000	7.766		13.766
5	(United States) Shilese Jones	5.500	8.166		13.666
6	(Netherlands) Naomi Visser	5.600	8.000	-0.30	13.300
7	(China) Zhou Yaqin	5.400	7.900		13.300
8	(United Kingdom) Alice Kinsella	4.900	7.766		12.666

- (United Kingdom) Jessica Gadirova withdrew and was replaced by first reserve (United Kingdom) Alice Kinsella.

== Qualification ==
=== Men ===
==== Team ====
Rank	Team	Floor (gymnastics)	Pommel horse	Rings (gymnastics)	Vault (gymnastics)	Parallel bars	Horizontal bar	Total	Qual.
1	Japan	43.166 (1)	42.099 (3)	41.666 (5)	42.965 (7)	44.666 (1)	43.666 (1)	258.228	Q
1	Kenta Chiba	13.900	14.700	13.666	14.333	14.700	14.500	258.228	Q
1	Daiki Hashimoto	14.500	13.266	13.700	14.366	14.600	15.000	258.228	Q
1	Kazuma Kaya	14.100	14.066	14.200	14.266	14.800	14.166	258.228	Q
1	Kazuki Minami	14.566			14.033			258.228	Q
1	Kaito Sugimoto		13.333	13.766		15.166	13.866	258.228	Q
2	United States	43.133 (2)	42.366 (2)	41.699 (3)	44.432 (1)	44.399 (2)	38.599 (20)	254.628	Q
2	Asher Hong	14.300	13.100	13.966	14.766	14.833	12.200	254.628	Q
2	Paul Juda	13.933		13.733	14.866		14.166	254.628	Q
2	Yul Moldauer	14.233	12.666	14.000		14.966		254.628	Q
2	Fred Richard	14.600	14.200	13.400	14.533	14.600	12.233	254.628	Q
2	Khoi Young		15.066		14.800	14.533	11.933	254.628	Q
3	Great Britain	42.832 (4)	43.199 (1)	42.499 (2)	41.966 (18)	43.165 (7)	40.532 (9)	254.193	Q
3	James Hall	13.966	14.033	13.833	13.500	14.466	13.833	254.193	Q
3	Harry Hepworth	14.500		14.366	14.466			254.193	Q
3	Jake Jarman	14.366	13.900	13.233	14.000	14.566	13.966	254.193	Q
3	Courtney Tulloch	12.133	DNS	14.300	13.233	12.200	DNS	254.193	Q
3	Max Whitlock		15.266			14.133	12.733	254.193	Q
4	Canada	42.033 (8)	40.232 (10)	41.699 (3)	42.165 (17)	41.799 (11)	41.332 (3)	249.260	Q
4	Zachary Clay	13.100	13.666	13.033	13.466	12.166	13.066	249.260	Q
4	René Cournoyer	13.500	12.933	13.666	14.233	13.800	13.866	249.260	Q
4	Félix Dolci	14.500		13.900	14.466	14.233	14.133	249.260	Q
4	William Émard	14.033	12.666	14.133	9.500	13.766	13.333	249.260	Q
4	Jayson Rampersad		13.633					249.260	Q
5	Germany	40.333 (19)	41.133 (5)	40.466 (9)	42.365 (14)	43.666 (3)	40.899 (6)	248.862	Q
5	Pascal Brendel	14.000	13.300	13.200	12.833	12.800	13.933	248.862	Q
5	Lukas Dauser	13.433	13.233	12.966	13.866	15.300	13.566	248.862	Q
5	Nils Dunkel		14.600	13.533		14.133	12.500	248.862	Q
5	Nick Klessing	12.233		13.733	14.433			248.862	Q
5	Lucas Kochan	12.900	13.100		14.066	14.233	13.400	248.862	Q
6	Italy	41.633 (11)	39.900 (13)	40.166 (11)	43.732 (3)	42.999 (8)	40.366 (12)	248.796	Q
6	Yumin Abbadini	13.533	13.500	13.500	13.966	14.000	14.033	248.796	Q
6	Nicola Bartolini	14.400	12.933		14.666			248.796	Q
6	Lorenzo Minh Casali	13.600	13.200	13.566	14.566	14.000	13.133	248.796	Q
6	Matteo Levantesi			12.333		14.833	12.500	248.796	Q
6	Mario Macchiati	13.633	13.200	13.100	14.500	14.166	13.200	248.796	Q
7	Switzerland	42.266 (5)	39.632 (14)	39.965 (15)	42.998 (6)	42.699 (10)	40.632 (8)	248.192	Q
7	Christian Baumann		13.500	13.666		14.066	13.233	248.192	Q
7	Luca Giubellini	13.866	11.433	DNS	14.366			248.192	Q
7	Florian Langenegger	14.200	13.366	12.933	14.266	13.866	13.233	248.192	Q
7	Noe Seifert	14.200	12.766	13.366	14.066	14.333	13.733	248.192	Q
7	Taha Serhani	11.700			14.366	14.300	13.666	248.192	Q
8	China	40.833 (15)	37.466 (20)	43.633 (1)	41.966 (18)	43.366 (5)	40.899 (6)	248.163	Q
8	Liu Yang	13.033		15.200	13.133			248.163	Q
8	Shi Cong	DNS	13.600	DNS	13.500	14.900	13.133	248.163	Q
8	Su Weide	14.200	10.900		14.266	DNS	14.300	248.163	Q
8	Sun Wei	13.600	12.966	13.633	14.200	14.233	13.466	248.163	Q
8	You Hao		DNS	14.800		14.233	10.600	248.163	Q
9	Spain	42.965 (3)	40.200 (11)	40.066 (12)	41.600 (23)	43.232 (6)	39.732 (15)	247.795	R1
9	Néstor Abad	14.166	13.100	13.600	13.200	13.800	13.033	247.795	R1
9	Thierno Diallo	13.633	13.600	13.300	14.00	14.366	11.900	247.795	R1
9	Nicolau Mir	14.333	12.766		13.100	14.433	13.633	247.795	R1
9	Joel Plata		13.500	13.033		14.433	13.066	247.795	R1
9	Rayderley Zapata	14.466		13.166	14.400			247.795	R1
10	Turkey	42.232 (6)	39.432 (15)	41.332 (6)	42.732 (9)	41.465 (14)	40.499 (10)	247.692	R2
10	Ferhat Arıcan		13.600		13.866	13.766	12.733	247.692	R2
10	Adem Asil	13.800	12.866	14.166	14.566	13.866	13.366	247.692	R2
10	Emre Dodanli	14.166		12.666	14.000	13.833	13.533	247.692	R2
10	Mehmet Ayberk Koşak	13.766	11.300	13.766				247.692	R2
10	Ahmet Önder	14.266	12.966	13.400	14.166	12.766	13.600	247.692	R2
11	Netherlands	40.566 (18)	40.699 (8)	40.233 (10)	42.632 (11)	40.766 (18)	41.132 (4)	246.028	R3
11	Loran de Munck		14.466	13.000		12.666		246.028	R3
11	Bart Deurloo	11.266		13.300	14.100		14.100	246.028	R3
11	Jermain Grünberg	13.733	10.500	12.933	13.700	14.500	13.666	246.028	R3
11	Jordi Hagenaar	13.300	13.100		14.166	12.333	13.366	246.028	R3
11	Casimir Schmidt	13.533	13.133	13.933	14.366	13.600	13.266	246.028	R3
12	Ukraine	39.899 (21)	40.799 (6)	40.065 (13)	44.065 (2)	43.533 (4)	37.100 (22)	245.461	R4
12	Nazar Chepurnyi	12.266	12.633	12.966	14.966	11.600	12.700	245.461	R4
12	Illia Kovtun	13.133	14.366	13.133	14.266	15.233	11.800	245.461	R4
12	Igor Radivilov			13.966	14.833			245.461	R4
12	Radomyr Stelmakh	13.233	13.800			13.500	10.933	245.461	R4
12	Oleg Verniaiev	13.533	12.000	12.866	13.366	14.800	12.600	245.461	R4

==== Individual all-around ====
Rank	Gymnast	Floor (gymnastics)	Pommel horse	Rings (gymnastics)	Vault (gymnastics)	Parallel bars	Horizontal bar	Total	Results
1	(Japan) Kenta Chiba	13.900	14.700	13.666	14.333	14.700	14.500	85.799	Q
2	(Japan) Kazuma Kaya	14.100	14.066	14.200	14.266	14.800	14.166	85.598	Q W
3	(Japan) Daiki Hashimoto	14.500	13.266	13.700	14.366	14.600	15.000	85.432	– S
4	(United Kingdom) Jake Jarman	14.366	13.900	13.233	14.000	14.566	13.966	84.031	Q
5	(United Kingdom) James Hall	13.966	14.033	13.833	13.500	14.466	13.833	83.631	Q
6	(United States) Fred Richard	14.600	14.200	13.400	14.533	14.600	12.233	83.566	Q
7	(Kazakhstan) Milad Karimi	14.500	12.200	13.166	14.566	14.200	14.600	83.232	Q
8	(United States) Asher Hong	14.300	13.100	13.966	14.766	14.833	12.200	83.165	Q
9	(Israel) Artem Dolgopyat	15.100	13.500	12.833	14.400	13.866	13.300	82.999	Q W
10	(Turkey) Adem Asil	13.800	12.866	14.166	14.566	13.866	13.366	82.630	Q W
11	(Italy) Yumin Abbadini	13.533	13.500	13.500	13.966	14.000	14.033	82.532	Q
12	(Switzerland) Noe Seifert	14.200	12.766	13.366	14.066	14.333	13.733	82.464	Q
13	(Germany) Lukas Dauser	13.433	13.233	12.966	13.866	15.300	13.566	82.364	Q
14	(China) Sun Wei	13.600	12.966	13.633	14.200	14.233	13.466	82.098	Q
15	(Italy) Lorenzo Minh Casali	13.600	13.200	13.566	14.566	14.000	13.133	82.065	Q W
16	(Armenia) Artur Davtyan	13.233	13.833	13.833	15.033	13.200	12.900	82.032	Q W
17	(Canada) René Cournoyer	13.500	12.933	13.666	14.233	13.800	13.866	81.998	Q
18	(Hungary) Krisztofer Mészáros	14.200	13.500	13.700	14.133	14.200	12.200	81.933	Q
19	(Ukraine) Illia Kovtun	13.133	14.366	13.133	14.266	15.233	11.800	81.931	Q
20	(Switzerland) Florian Langenegger	14.200	13.366	12.933	14.266	13.866	13.233	81.864	Q
21	(Netherlands) Casimir Schmidt	13.533	13.133	13.933	14.366	13.600	13.266	81.831	Q
22	(Italy) Mario Macchiati	13.633	13.200	13.100	14.500	14.166	13.200	81.799	– S
23	(South Korea) Lee Jun-ho	13.633	12.666	13.566	14.300	14.000	13.500	81.665	Q
24	(Israel) Ilia Liubimov	13.633	13.900	12.466	14.033	13.933	13.433	81.398	Q
25	(Turkey) Ahmet Önder	14.266	12.966	13.400	14.166	12.766	13.600	81.164	Q
26	(Brazil) Diogo Soares	12.866	13.766	13.000	14.033	14.233	13.166	81.064	Q
27	(Spain) Néstor Abad	14.166	13.100	13.600	13.200	13.800	13.033	80.899	R1 W
28	(Spain) Thierno Diallo	13.633	13.600	13.300	14.000	14.366	11.900	80.799	R2 S
29	(Belgium) Luka van den Keybus	13.933	12.066	12.800	14.400	14.366	13.233	80.798	R3 S
30	(Romania) Andrei Muntean	13.633	11.666	13.500	14.500	14.400	12.966	80.665	R4 W
31	(Uzbekistan) Khabibullo Ergashev	13.233	13.966	13.100	14.000	13.133	13.233	80.665	q (Note: Due to withdrawal of fourth reserve, there is a quota place to one gymnast in the final event. The FIG do not name officially "Reserve 5" to this situation.)

==== Floor exercise ====
Rank	Gymnast	D Score	E Score	Pen.	Total	Qual.
1	(Israel) Artem Dolgopyat	6.400	8.800	-0.10	15.100	Q
2	(United States) Fred Richard	6.000	8.600		14.600	Q
3	(Philippines) Carlos Yulo	6.300	8.400	-0.10	14.600	Q
4	(Japan) Kazuki Minami	6.200	8.366		14.566	Q
5	(Canada) Félix Dolci	6.000	8.600	-0.10	14.500	Q
6	(Japan) Daiki Hashimoto	6.000	8.500		14.500	Q
7	(Kazakhstan) Milad Karimi	6.300	8.300	-0.10	14.500	Q
8	(United Kingdom) Harry Hepworth	6.400	8.200	-0.10	14.500	Q
9	(Spain) Rayderley Zapata	6.200	8.266		14.466	R1
10	(Italy) Nicola Bartolini	5.900	8.500		14.400	R2
11	(United Kingdom) Jake Jarman	6.700	7.866	-0.20	14.366	R3

==== Pommel horse ====
Rank	Gymnast	D Score	E Score	Pen.	Total	Qual.
1	(United Kingdom) Max Whitlock	6.800	8.466		15.266	Q
2	(United States) Khoi Young	6.600	8.466		15.066	Q
3	(Republic of Ireland) Rhys McClenaghan	6.400	8.533		14.933	Q
4	(Jordan) Ahmad Abu Al-Soud	6.400	8.500		14.900	Q
5	(Chinese Taipei) Lee Chih-kai	6.200	8.600		14.800	Q
6	(Japan) Kenta Chiba	6.100	8.600		14.700	Q
7	(Armenia) Harutyun Merdinyan	6.000	8.600		14.600	Q
8	(Germany) Nils Dunkel	6.200	8.400		14.600	Q
9	(Armenia) Gagik Khachikyan	6.500	8.100		14.600	R1
10	(Netherlands) Loran de Munck	6.500	7.966		14.466	R2
11	(Australia) Vedant Sawant	6.100	8.300		14.400	R3

==== Rings ====
Rank	Gymnast	D Score	E Score	Pen.	Total	Qual.
1	(China) Liu Yang	6.400	8.800		15.200	Q
2	(Greece) Eleftherios Petrounias	6.300	8.600		14.900	Q
3	(China) You Hao	6.500	8.300		14.800	Q
4	(Azerbaijan) Nikita Simonov	6.200	8.466		14.666	Q
5	(Austria) Vinzenz Hoeck	6.100	8.500		14.600	Q
6=	(Armenia) Artur Avetisyan	5.900	8.533		14.433	Q
6=	(Armenia) Vahagn Davtyan	5.900	8.533		14.433	Q
8	(United Kingdom) Harry Hepworth	5.800	8.566		14.366	Q
9	(United Kingdom) Courtney Tulloch	6.200	8.100		14.300	R1
10	(Japan) Kazuma Kaya	5.800	8.400		14.200	R2
11	(Chinese Taipei) Lin Guan-yi	5.900	8.266		14.166	R3

==== Vault ====
Rank	Gymnast	Vault 1				Vault 2				Total	Qual.
Rank	Gymnast	D Score	E Score	Pen.	Score 1	D Score	E Score	Pen.	Score 2	Total	Qual.
1	(Armenia) Artur Davtyan	5.600	9.433		15.033	5.600	9.433		15.033	15.033	Q
2	(Ukraine) Igor Radivilov	5.600	9.233		14.833	5.600	9.100		14.700	14.766	Q
3	(Ukraine) Nazar Chepurnyi	5.600	9.366		14.966	5.600	8.900		14.500	14.733	Q
4	(United Kingdom) Harry Hepworth	5.600	8.966	-0.10	14.466	5.600	9.366		14.966	14.716	Q
5	(United States) Paul Juda	5.600	9.266		14.866	5.200	9.266		14.466	14.583	Q
6	(United States) Khoi Young	5.600	9.300	-0.10	14.800	5.400	8.966		14.366	14.583	Q
7	(United States) Asher Hong	6.000	8.866	-0.10	14.766	5.200	9.066		14.266	14.516	-
8	(United Kingdom) Jake Jarman	6.000	8.000		14.000	5.600	9.333		14.933	14.466	Q
9	(Bulgaria) Kevin Penev	5.200	9.133		14.333	5.200	9.366		14.566	14.449	Q
10	(Dominican Republic) Audrys Nin Reyes	5.200	9.033		14.233	5.600	9.000		14.600	14.416	R1
11	(Uzbekistan) Abdulaziz Mirvaliev	5.600	8.933		14.533	5.600	8.633		14.233	14.383	R2
12	(Japan) Kazuki Minami	5.600	8.433		14.033	5.200	9.500		14.700	14.366	R3

==== Parallel Bars ====
Rank	Gymnast	D Score	E Score	Pen.	Total	Qual.
1	(Germany) Lukas Dauser	6.600	8.700		15.300	Q
2	(Ukraine) Illia Kovtun	6.700	8.533		15.233	Q
3	(Japan) Kaito Sugimoto	6.300	8.866		15.166	Q
4	(United States) Yul Moldauer	6.600	8.366		14.966	Q
5	(China) Shi Cong	6.300	8.600		14.900	Q
6	(United States) Asher Hong	6.000	8.833		14.833	Q
7	(Italy) Matteo Levantesi	6.200	8.633		14.833	Q
8	(Japan) Kazuma Kaya	6.300	8.500		14.800	Q
9	(Ukraine) Oleg Verniaiev	6.600	8.200		14.800	R1
10	(Japan) Kenta Chiba	6.100	8.600		14.700	-
11	(Philippines) Carlos Edriel Yulo	6.200	8.466		14.666	R2
12	(United States) Fred Richard	6.000	8.600		14.600	-
13	(Japan) Daiki Hashimoto	6.100	8.500		14.600	-
14	(United Kingdom) Jake Jarman	5.900	8.666		14.566	R3

==== Horizontal Bar ====
Rank	Gymnast	D Score	E Score	Pen.	Total	Qual.
1	(Japan) Daiki Hashimoto	6.600	8.400		15.000	Q
2	(Kazakhstan) Milad Karimi	6.300	8.300		14.600	Q
3	(Japan) Kenta Chiba	5.700	8.800		14.500	Q
4	(Croatia) Tin Srbić	5.900	8.533		14.433	Q
5	(China) Su Weide	6.000	8.300		14.300	Q
6	(United States) Paul Juda	5.400	8.766		14.166	Q
7	(Japan) Kazuma Kaya	5.900	8.266		14.166	-
8	(Canada) Félix Dolci	5.700	8.433		14.133	Q
9	(Brazil) Arthur Mariano	5.800	8.333		14.133	Q
10	(Netherlands) Bart Deurloo	5.800	8.300		14.100	R1
11	(Italy) Yumin Abbadini	5.900	8.133		14.033	R2
12	(United Kingdom) Jake Jarman	5.500	8.466		13.966	R3

=== Women ===
==== Team ====
Rank	Team	Vault (gymnastics)	Uneven bars	Balance beam	Floor (gymnastics)	Total	Qual.
1	United States	43.998 (1)	43.366 (2)	41.965 (2)	42.066 (1)	171.395	Q
1	Simone Biles	15.266	14.400	14.566	14.633	171.395	Q
1	Skye Blakely		14.133	11.866		171.395	Q
1	Shilese Jones	14.266	14.833	14.033	13.800	171.395	Q
1	Joscelyn Roberson	14.466			13.633	171.395	Q
1	Leanne Wong	14.166	13.666	13.366	13.200	171.395	Q
2	Great Britain	42.900 (2)	41.332 (5)	40.699 (3)	41.199 (2)	166.130	Q
2	Ondine Achampong	14.300	12.733	13.433	12.866	166.130	Q
2	Ruby Evans	13.066			13.166	166.130	Q
2	Georgia-Mae Fenton		14.033	13.266		166.130	Q
2	Jessica Gadirova	14.600	13.766	14.000	14.400	166.130	Q
2	Alice Kinsella	14.000	13.533	12.133	13.633	166.130	Q
3	China	39.499 (14)	43.533 (1)	42.666 (1)	39.965 (5)	165.663	Q
3	Huang Zhuofan		14.533			165.663	Q
3	Ou Yushan	13.100	14.100	14.066	13.366	165.663	Q
3	Qiu Qiyuan	13.133	14.900	13.800	12.833	165.663	Q
3	Zhang Qingying	13.266	11.066	14.100	DNS	165.663	Q
3	Zhou Yaqin	12.933		14.500	13.766	165.663	Q
4	Brazil	42.599 (3)	40.232 (7)	40.400 (4)	41.066 (3)	164.297	Q
4	Rebeca Andrade	14.900	13.866	13.800	14.033	164.297	Q
4	Jade Barbosa	13.833	12.766	12.400	12.833	164.297	Q
4	Lorrane Oliveira		12.033			164.297	Q
4	Flávia Saraiva	13.866	13.600	13.400	13.833	164.297	Q
4	Júlia Soares	12.866		13.200	13.200	164.297	Q
5	Italy	41.599 (7)	40.099 (8)	40.266 (5)	40.266 (4)	162.230	Q
5	Angela Andreoli		12.666	13.200		162.230	Q
5	Arianna Belardelli	13.833			13.266	162.230	Q
5	Alice D'Amato	14.000	13.033	12.533	13.400	162.230	Q
5	Manila Esposito	13.766	13.666	13.666	13.600	162.230	Q
5	Elisa Iorio	13.233	13.400	13.400	12.933	162.230	Q
6	Netherlands	40.800 (9)	41.632 (3)	39.066 (10)	39.699 (6)	161.197	Q
6	Eythora Thorsdottir	13.900	13.266	12.133	12.900	161.197	Q
6	Vera van Pol	13.600	13.066	10.866	13.066	161.197	Q
6	Sanna Veerman	13.300	14.200		12.333	161.197	Q
6	Naomi Visser	13.233	14.166	13.200	13.733	161.197	Q
6	Sanne Wevers			13.733		161.197	Q
7	France	42.132 (4)	40.899 (6)	39.166 (9)	38.733 (9)	160.930	Q
7	Marine Boyer	13.366	12.700	13.400	12.000	160.930	Q
7	Lorette Charpy		14.133	12.400		160.930	Q
7	Mélanie de Jesus dos Santos	14.366	14.066	12.733	13.300	160.930	Q
7	Coline Devillard	14.400			11.900	160.930	Q
7	Morgane Osyssek-Reimer	13.333	12.033	13.033	13.433	160.930	Q
8	Japan	41.600 (6)	38.465 (15)	39.866 (6)	38.566 (11)	158.497	Q
8	Urara Ashikawa			14.000		158.497	Q
8	Kokoro Fukasawa	13.466	12.033		12.633	158.497	Q
8	Chiaki Hatakeda	13.500	12.933	13.166	12.600	158.497	Q
8	Rina Kishi	14.000	12.166	12.700	13.333	158.497	Q
8	Shoko Miyata	14.100	13.366	11.900	12.366	158.497	Q
9	Australia	38.899 (23)	41.399 (4)	39.333 (8)	38.265 (13)	157.896	R1
9	Georgia Godwin	13.633	13.666	13.133	12.766	157.896	R1
9	Kate McDonald		13.900	12.066		157.896	R1
9	Ruby Pass	11.900	13.833	12.600	12.733	157.896	R1
9	Breanna Scott	13.100		13.600	12.633	157.896	R1
9	Emily Whitehead	12.166	12.800		12.766	157.896	R1
10	Romania	40.099 (12)	39.132 (12)	38.965 (11)	39.599 (7)	157.795	R2
10	Ana Bărbosu	13.500	13.366	12.866	13.200	157.795	R2
10	Lilia Cosman	13.633	13.033		12.733	157.795	R2
10	Amalia Ghigoarță		12.600	12.433		157.795	R2
10	Sabrina Voinea	0.000		13.666	13.666	157.795	R2
10	Andreea Preda	12.966	12.733	11.966	12.300	157.795	R2
11	South Korea	41.533 (8)	39.899 (10)	37.632 (14)	38.233 (14)	157.297	R3
11	Eom Do-hyun		13.133	11.733		157.297	R3
11	Lee Yun-seo	13.300	13.633	12.766	13.000	157.297	R3
11	Lee Da-yeong	13.266	13.133		12.533	157.297	R3
11	Shin Sol-yi	13.500	12.800	11.800	12.500	157.297	R3
11	Yeo Seo-jeong	14.733		13.066	12.700	157.297	R3
12	Canada	40.665 (11)	40.066 (9)	37.699 (13)	38.799 (8)	157.229	R4
12	Ellie Black	13.966	14.133	13.566	13.400	157.229	R4
12	Cassie Lee	13.100		9.700	12.666	157.229	R4
12	Ava Stewart	13.466	12.800		12.733	157.229	R4
12	Aurélie Tran	13.233	13.133	11.933	12.600	157.229	R4
12	Rose-Kaying Woo		12.166	12.200		157.229	R4

==== Individual all-around ====
Rank	Gymnast	Vault (gymnastics)	Uneven bars	Balance beam	Floor (gymnastics)	Total	Results
1	(United States) Simone Biles	15.266	14.400	14.566	14.633	58.865	Q
2	(United States) Shilese Jones	14.266	14.833	14.033	13.800	56.932	Q
3	(United Kingdom) Jessica Gadirova	14.600	13.766	14.000	14.400	56.766	Q W
4	(Brazil) Rebeca Andrade	14.900	13.866	13.800	14.033	56.599	Q
5	(Canada) Ellie Black	13.966	14.133	13.566	13.400	55.065	Q
6	(Brazil) Flávia Saraiva	13.866	13.600	13.400	13.833	54.699	Q
7	(Italy) Manila Esposito	13.766	13.666	13.666	13.600	54.698	Q
8	(China) Qiu Qiyuan	13.133	14.900	13.800	12.833	54.666	Q
9	(China) Ou Yushan	13.100	14.100	14.066	13.366	54.632	Q W
10	(France) Mélanie de Jesus dos Santos	14.366	14.066	12.733	13.300	54.465	Q
11	(United States) Leanne Wong	14.166	13.666	13.366	13.200	54.398	–
12	(Netherlands) Naomi Visser	13.233	14.166	13.200	13.733	54.332	Q
13	(Algeria) Kaylia Nemour	13.000	14.733	13.266	12.700	53.699	Q
14	(United Kingdom) Ondine Achampong	14.300	12.733	13.433	12.866	53.332	Q
15	(United Kingdom) Alice Kinsella	14.000	13.533	12.133	13.633	53.299	– S
16	(Australia) Georgia Godwin	13.633	13.666	13.133	12.766	53.198	Q
17	(Italy) Alice D'Amato	14.000	13.033	12.533	13.400	52.966	Q
18	(Italy) Elisa Iorio	13.233	13.400	13.400	12.933	52.966	–
19	(Romania) Ana Bărbosu	13.500	13.366	12.866	13.200	52.932	Q
20	(Germany) Pauline Schäfer	12.966	12.966	14.066	12.733	52.731	Q
21	(South Korea) Lee Yun-seo	13.300	13.633	12.766	13.000	52.699	Q
22	(Mexico) Alexa Moreno	14.566	12.466	12.266	13.033	52.331	Q
23	(Germany) Sarah Voss	13.433	12.733	12.866	13.200	52.232	Q
24	(Netherlands) Eythora Thorsdottir	13.900	13.266	12.133	12.900	52.199	Q
25	(Japan) Rina Kishi	14.000	12.166	12.700	13.333	52.199	Q
26	(Japan) Chiaki Hatakeda	13.500	12.933	13.166	12.600	52.199	Q
27	(Portugal) Filipa Martins	13.166	13.333	12.633	12.833	51.965	Q
28	(France) Morgane Osyssek-Reimer	13.333	12.033	13.033	13.433	51.832	R1 S
29	(Brazil) Jade Barbosa	13.833	12.766	12.400	12.833	51.832	–
30	(Japan) Shoko Miyata	14.100	13.366	11.900	12.366	51.732	–
31	(France) Marine Boyer	13.366	12.700	13.400	12.000	51.466	–
32	(Philippines) Aleah Finnegan	13.400	12.433	12.700	12.833	51.366	R2
33	(Hungary) Bettina Lili Czifra	13.633	12.733	12.866	12.133	51.365	R3
34	(Hungary) Zója Székely	13.033	13.866	12.166	12.200	51.265	R4

==== Vault ====
Rank	Gymnast	Vault 1				Vault 2				Total	Results
Rank	Gymnast	D Score	E Score	Pen.	Score 1	D Score	E Score	Pen.	Score 2	Total	Results
1	(United States) Simone Biles	6.400	9.366	-0.50	15.266	5.600	9.033		14.633	14.949	Q
2	(Brazil) Rebeca Andrade	5.600	9.300		14.900	5.000	9.366		14.366	14.633	Q
3	(South Korea) Yeo Seo-jeong	5.400	9.333		14.733	5.000	9.300		14.300	14.516	Q
4	(United Kingdom) Jessica Gadirova	5.600	9.100	-0.10	14.600	5.000	9.233		14.233	14.416	Q W
5	(Mexico) Alexa Moreno	5.400	9.166		14.566	5.200	8.833	-0.30	13.733	14.149	Q
6	(United States) Joscelyn Roberson	5.600	8.866		14.466	5.000	8.733	-0.10	13.633	14.049	Q W
7	(Japan) Shoko Miyata	5.000	9.100		14.100	4.800	8.900		13.700	13.900	Q
8	(France) Coline Devillard	5.400	9.000		14.400	4.200	8.966		13.166	13.783	Q
9	(Canada) Ellie Black	5.000	8.966		13.966	4.800	8.766		13.566	13.766	R1 S
10	(United States) Leanne Wong	5.000	9.166		14.166	4.200	8.900		13.100	13.633	– S
11	(Hungary) Csenge Bácskay	5.000	8.800		13.800	4.400	8.800		13.200	13.500	R2 S
12	(Mexico) Ahtziri Sandoval	5.200	8.733		13.933	4.000	8.666		12.666	13.299	R3

==== Uneven bars ====
Rank	Gymnast	D Score	E Score	Pen.	Total	Qual.
1	(China) Qiu Qiyuan	6.500	8.400		14.900	Q
2	(United States) Shilese Jones	6.400	8.433		14.833	Q
3	(Algeria) Kaylia Nemour	6.800	7.933		14.733	Q
4	(China) Huang Zhuofan	6.500	8.033		14.533	Q
5	(United States) Simone Biles	6.000	8.400		14.400	Q
6	(Netherlands) Sanna Veerman	6.300	7.900		14.200	Q
7	(Netherlands) Naomi Visser	6.000	8.166		14.166	Q
8	(United States) Skye Blakely	5.900	8.233		14.133	–
9	(Canada) Ellie Black	6.000	8.133		14.133	Q
9	(France) Lorette Charpy	6.000	8.133		14.133	Q
11	(China) Ou Yushan	5.800	8.300		14.100	–
12	(France) Mélanie de Jesus dos Santos	6.100	7.966		14.066	R1
13	(United Kingdom) Georgia-Mae Fenton	6.000	8.033		14.033	R2
14	(Australia) Kate McDonald	5.700	8.200		13.900	R3

==== Balance beam ====
Rank	Gymnast	D Score	E Score	Pen.	Total	Qual.
1	(United States) Simone Biles	6.300	8.266		14.566	Q
2	(China) Zhou Yaqin	6.400	8.100		14.500	Q
3	(China) Zhang Qingying	6.300	7.800		14.100	Q
4	(Germany) Pauline Schäfer	5.800	8.266		14.066	Q
5	(China) Ou Yushan	6.300	7.766		14.066	–
6	(United States) Shilese Jones	5.900	8.133		14.033	Q
7	(United Kingdom) Jessica Gadirova	5.800	8.200		14.000	Q W
8	(Japan) Urara Ashikawa	5.900	8.100		14.000	Q
9	(Brazil) Rebeca Andrade	5.900	7.900		13.800	Q
10	(China) Qiu Qiyuan	6.200	7.600		13.800	–
11	(Netherlands) Sanne Wevers	5.300	8.433		13.733	R1 S
12	(Italy) Manila Esposito	5.500	8.166		13.666	R2
13	(Romania) Sabrina Voinea	6.200	7.466		13.666	R3

==== Floor exercise ====
Rank	Gymnast	D Score	E Score	Pen.	Total	Results
1	(United States) Simone Biles	6.700	7.933		14.633	Q
2	(United Kingdom) Jessica Gadirova	6.200	8.200		14.400	Q W
3	(Brazil) Rebeca Andrade	6.100	7.933		14.033	Q
4	(Brazil) Flávia Saraiva	5.700	8.133		13.833	Q
5	(United States) Shilese Jones	5.700	8.100		13.800	Q
6	(China) Zhou Yaqin	5.600	8.166		13.766	Q
7	(Netherlands) Naomi Visser	5.800	7.933		13.733	Q
8	(Romania) Sabrina Voinea	6.000	7.666		13.666	Q
9	(United Kingdom) Alice Kinsella	5.600	8.033		13.633	R1 S
10	(United States) Joscelyn Roberson	6.200	7.433		13.633	–
11	(Italy) Manila Esposito	5.600	8.100	-0.10	13.600	R2
12	(France) Morgane Osyssek-Reimer	5.500	7.933		13.433	R3

== Participating nations ==
- Andorra
- Algeria
- Argentina
- Armenia
- Australia
- Austria
- Barbados
- Belgium
- Brazil
- Bulgaria
- Canada
- Cayman Islands
- Chile
- China
- Chinese Taipei
- Colombia
- Croatia
- Cuba
- Cyprus
- Czech Republic
- Denmark
- Dominican Republic
- Ecuador
- Egypt
- Finland
- France
- Germany
- Great Britain
- Greece
- Haiti
- Hungary
- Iceland
- Indonesia
- Ireland
- Israel
- Italy
- Japan
- Jordan
- Kazakhstan
- Latvia
- Lithuania
- Luxembourg
- Malaysia
- Malta
- Mexico
- Monaco
- Mongolia
- Morocco
- Netherlands
- New Zealand
- Norway
- Panama
- Peru
- Philippines
- Portugal
- Puerto Rico
- Romania
- San Marino
- Serbia
- Singapore
- Slovakia
- Slovenia
- South Africa
- South Korea
- Spain
- Sri Lanka
- Sweden
- Switzerland
- Turkey
- Ukraine
- United States
- Uzbekistan
- Vietnam
