= Su Weide =

Chinese artistic gymnast

- Born: 19 March 2000 (age 26) Zibo, Shandong, China

Gymnastics career
- Discipline: Men's artistic gymnastics
- Country represented: China
- Club: Shandong Province
Medal record
Representing China
Olympic Games
Silver medal – second place	2024 Paris	Team
World Championships
Gold medal – first place	2022 Liverpool	Team
Silver medal – second place	2023 Antwerp	Team
Bronze medal – third place	2023 Antwerp	Horizontal bar
Asian Championships
Gold medal – first place	2023 Singapore	Team
Bronze medal – third place	2023 Singapore	Floor exercise
National Games
Gold medal – first place	2021 Shaanxi	Floor Exercise

Su Weide (Chinese: 苏炜德; pinyin: Sū Wěidé; born 19 March 2000) is a Chinese artistic gymnast. He represented China at the 2024 Summer Olympics and won a silver medal in the team event. He also won a silver medal with the Chinese team at the 2023 World Championships, where he also won a bronze medal on the horizontal bar. He received a gold medal as the team alternate at the 2022 World Championships. He won a bronze medal on the floor exercise at the 2023 Asian Championships.

== Gymnastics career ==
At the 2018 Chinese Championships, Su won a silver medal on the floor exercise. He then finished sixth on the floor exercise at the 2019 Chinese Championships. At the 2021 National Games of China, he won a gold medal in the floor exercise final.

Su won a silver medal on the floor exercise at the 2022 Chinese Championships behind Zhang Boheng. He was the team alternate for the 2022 World Championships where the Chinese team won the gold medal.

=== 2023 ===
At the Chinese Championships, Su won a silver medal in the floor exercise final and placed fifth in the horizontal bar final. He was a member of the Chinese team that won the gold medal at the Asian Championships. He also won a bronze medal on the floor exercise. He then competed at the World University Games and won a gold medal with the Chinese team.

Su competed at the World Championships alongside Lin Chaopan, Liu Yang, Sun Wei, and You Hao. The team won a silver medal behind Japan after Su fell off the horizontal bar twice. Individually, Su qualified for the horizontal bar final and won the bronze medal behind Daiki Hashimoto and Tin Srbić.

=== 2024 ===
Su competed at the DTB Pokal Stuttgart and won a bronze medal with the Chinese team. Then at the Chinese Championships, he won a gold medal on the floor exercise and placed eighth on the horizontal bar final. Su was initially the team alternate for the 2024 Summer Olympics. However, he was added to the team after Sun Wei withdrew due to injury. He competed alongside Liu Yang, Zhang Boheng, Xiao Ruoteng, and Zou Jingyuan, and the team qualified first for the team final. However, in the team final, Su fell off the horizontal bar twice, causing the team to lose to Japan narrowly. He also fell in the horizontal bar final, finishing in fifth place. He apologized for his mistakes on the Chinese social media platform Douyin.
