= Laura Casabuena =

Spanish artistic gymnast

- Full name: Laura Casabuena García
- Born: 26 December 2005 (age 20) Alcoy, Spain

Gymnastics career
- Discipline: Women's artistic gymnastics
- Country represented: Spain; (2021–present)
- Club: Club El Pastoret
- Head coach: Lucia Guisado
Medal record
Artistic gymnastics
Representing Spain
Mediterranean Games
Bronze medal – third place	2022 Oran	Team
FIG World Cup
Event / 1st / 2nd / 3rd; Apparatus World Cup / 0 / 0 / 2

Laura Casabuena García (Note: In this Spanish name, the first or paternal surname is Casabuena and the second or maternal family name is García.) (born 26 December 2005) is a Spanish artistic gymnast. She was part of the bronze medal-winning team at the 2022 Mediterranean Games. She represented Spain at the 2024 Summer Olympics.

== Early life ==
Casabuena was born in Alcoy, Spain, on 26 December 2005. She began gymnastics when she was six after being inspired by the 2012 Summer Olympics. She has a younger sister, Lucía, who also competes in gymnastics.

== Gymnastics career ==
Casabuena finished fifth in the all-around in the junior division of the 2020 Spanish Championships. She became age-eligible for senior competition in 2021, finishing fifth all-around in the senior division at the 2021 Spanish Championships.

=== 2022 ===
Casabuena made her international debut at the Koper World Challenge Cup where she finished fifth on uneven bars and seventh on floor exercise. In June, she competed at the Mediterranean Games, where the Spanish team took the bronze medal behind Italy and France. Individually, Casabuena finished seventh in the all-around, fifth on the balance beam, and seventh on the floor exercise. At the European Championships in Munich, Casabuena helped Spain qualify for the team final, where they placed eighth. She qualified for the floor exercise final at the Paris World Challenge Cup and finished fourth.

Casabuena won the all-around bronze medal at the Joaquim Blume Memorial. She then competed at the World Championships and qualified for the all-around final. In the final, she fell off the balance beam multiple times and finished 24th. After the World Championships, she competed at the Arthur Gander Memorial and finished sixth in the all-around. She ended by season by competing at the Swiss Cup with Joel Plata, and they finished fourth.

=== 2023 ===
Casabuena started the season competing at the Cottbus World Cup where she finished sixth on vault and eighth on floor exercise. She next competed at the City of Jesolo Trophy where she helped the Spanish team win the bronze medal behind Italy and South Korea. Individually, she won the gold medal on the floor exercise. At the European Championships, Casabuena helped the Spanish team finish eighth. She also qualified for the all-around final where she finished tenth and the floor exercise final where she finished sixth.

Casabuena finished fifth in the all-around at the Spanish Championships. Then at the RomGym Trophy, she helped Spain win the silver medal behind Romania. Individually, she won the all-around bronze medal behind Romanians Ana Bărbosu and Sabrina Voinea. She also won the bronze medal in the floor exercise final behind Voinea and Canada's Laurie Denommée. At the World Championships, Casabuena finished 45th in the all-around during qualifications while the team finished in 16th place.

=== 2024 ===
Casabuena registered for the 2024 FIG World Cup series to earn points for Olympic qualification. At the first event in Cairo, she won a bronze medal on the floor exercise. Then at the Cottbus World Cup, she finished eighth on the balance beam. She finished sixth on the floor exercise at the Baku World Cup. At the final event in Doha, she finished fifth on the balance beam and won the bronze medal on the floor exercise. At the conclusion of the World Cup series, Casabuena earned an individual Olympic berth for the upcoming Olympic Games. She earned enough points for qualification on both the balance beam and floor exercise and was awarded the floor exercise quota because she earned more qualification points on that event than she earned on the balance beam.

== Competitive history ==
Competitive history of Laura Casabuena
Year	Event	Team	AA	VT	UB	BB	FX
2020	Spanish Championships		5				
2021	Spanish Championships		5				
2022	Koper World Challenge Cup				5		7
2022	Mediterranean Games	3rd place, bronze medalist(s)	7			5	7
2022	Spanish Championships		2nd place, silver medalist(s)	3rd place, bronze medalist(s)	2nd place, silver medalist(s)	1st place, gold medalist(s)	1st place, gold medalist(s)
2022	European Championships	8	22				
2022	Paris World Challenge Cup						4
2022	Joaquim Blume Memorial		3rd place, bronze medalist(s)				
2022	World Championships	17	24				
2022	Arthur Gander Memorial		6				
2022	Swiss Cup	4					
2023	Cottbus World Cup			6			8
2023	City of Jesolo Trophy	3rd place, bronze medalist(s)	22				1st place, gold medalist(s)
2023	European Championships	8	10				6
2023	Spanish Championships		5				
2023	RomGym Trophy	2nd place, silver medalist(s)	3rd place, bronze medalist(s)				3rd place, bronze medalist(s)
2023	World Championships	16	45				
2024	Cairo World Cup						3rd place, bronze medalist(s)
2024	Cottbus World Cup					8	
2024	Baku World Cup						6
2024	Doha World Cup					5	3rd place, bronze medalist(s)
2024	European Championships	5					
2024	Olympic Games		35				
2025	Paris World Challenge Cup				7	8	
2025	Szombathely World Challenge Cup				8		
2026
2026	World Championships	13					
