= Lena Bickel =

Swiss artistic gymnast

- Bickel at the 2026 Swiss Cup

Personal information
- Born: 22 December 2004 (age 21) Mendrisio, Switzerland

Gymnastics career
- Discipline: Women's artistic gymnastics
- Country represented: Switzerland; (2021–present)
- Club: SFG Morbio Inferiore

Lena Bickel (born 22 December 2004) is a Swiss artistic gymnast. She competed at the 2023 World Championships and qualified as an individual to the 2024 Olympic Games, where she represented Switzerland. She is the 2023 Swiss all-around champion.

== Early life ==
Bickel was born on 22 December 2004 in Mendrisio. She began gymnastics when she was four years old.

== Gymnastics career ==
=== Junior ===
At the 2017 Swiss Junior Championships, Bickel finished 14th in the all-around. She made her international debut at the Swiss Cup Juniors, and she helped the Swiss team win the bronze medal behind Germany and Belgium. Then at the 2017 Tournoi International, she finished 26th in the all-around.

Bickel won the vault and uneven bars titles at the 2018 Swiss Junior Championships, and she finished fifth in the all-around. Then at the Pieve di Soligo Friendly, she competed with the Swiss team that finished fifth. At the 2018 European Championships, Bickel helped the Swiss team finish 14th. She won the gold medal on the uneven bars at the 2018 Tournoi International and placed sixth in the all-around.

Bickel won the all-around silver medal at the 2019 Swiss Junior Championships, and she won the vault title. Then at the Swiss Turnfest, she finished fourth in the all-around. At the Sainté Gym Cup, she competed with the Swiss team that placed fifth. She then competed at the 2019 European Youth Summer Olympic Festival. She qualified for the all-around final where she finished 20th, and she finished fifth in the uneven bars final.

=== Senior ===
Bickel became age-eligible for senior international competitions in 2020, but she did not compete that year as a result of the COVID-19 pandemic. She made her senior international debut at the 2021 Swiss Cup. She competed with Noe Seifert, and they finished in fourth place.

==== 2022 ====
At the Swiss Championships, Bickel won the silver medal in the all-around and the gold medal on the uneven bars. Then at the Austrian team challenge, she helped the Swiss team win the bronze medal. In July, she tore a ligament in her right foot. She returned to competition in November at the Arthur Gander Memorial and won the all-around silver medal behind Alice D’Amato. She then competed at the Swiss Cup with Noe Seifert, and they finished ninth.

==== 2023 ====
Bickel completed at the Magglingen Friendly and won the all-around gold medal by nearly two points ahead of teammate Caterina Cereghetti. She competed with the Swiss team at the European Championships, and they finished 17th. She was the first reserve for the floor exercise final. At the Swiss Championships, she won the all-around title by over a full point. In the event finals, she won gold on the floor exercise and silver on uneven bars and balance beam. She competed with the Swiss team that finished fourth at the Heidelberg Friendly. She then competed at the World Championships in Antwerp and finished 39th in the all-around during the qualification round. Although she did not qualify for the all-around final, she qualified as an individual to the 2024 Olympic Games by finishing ninth out of the gymnast whose countries did not qualify a full team.

==== 2024 ====
At the 2024 Olympic Games Bickel finished thirty-ninth during qualifications and did not advance to any finals.

==== 2025 ====
Bickel competed at the 2025 Artistic Gymnastics World Championships and qualified for the all-around final, in which she finished in 16th place.

== Personal life ==
Bickel speaks Italian, French, German, and English. Her hobbies include skiing and swimming.

== Competitive history ==
Competitive history of Lena Bickel at the junior level
Year	Event	Team	AA	VT	UB	BB	FX
2017	Swiss Junior Championships		14				
2017	Swiss Cup Juniors	3rd place, bronze medalist(s)	7				
2017	Tournoi International		26				
2018	Swiss Junior Championships		5	1st place, gold medalist(s)	1st place, gold medalist(s)	6	
2018	Pieve di Soligo Friendly	5	15				
2018	Junior European Championships	14					
2018	Tournoi International		6		1st place, gold medalist(s)		
2019	Swiss Junior Championships		2nd place, silver medalist(s)	1st place, gold medalist(s)	4	2nd place, silver medalist(s)	2nd place, silver medalist(s)
2019	Swiss Turnfest		4				
2019	Sainté Gym Cup	5	13				
2019	European Youth Olympic Festival	11	20		5		

Competitive history of Lena Bickel at the junior level
Year	Event	Team	AA	VT	UB	BB	FX
2021	Swiss Cup	4					
2022	Swiss Championships		2nd place, silver medalist(s)		1st place, gold medalist(s)		
2022	Austrian Team Challenge	3rd place, bronze medalist(s)					
2022	Arthur Gander Memorial		2nd place, silver medalist(s)				
2022	Swiss Cup	9					
2023	Magglingen Friendly		1st place, gold medalist(s)				
2023	European Championships	17					R1
2023	Swiss Championships		1st place, gold medalist(s)		2nd place, silver medalist(s)	2nd place, silver medalist(s)	1st place, gold medalist(s)
2023	Heidelberg Friendly	4	8				
2023	World Championships		39				
2024	Koper World Challenge Cup						1st place, gold medalist(s)
2024	Swiss Championships		1st place, gold medalist(s)				
2024	RomGym Trophy		7		7	2nd place, silver medalist(s)	3rd place, bronze medalist(s)
2024	Olympic Games		39				
2025	Paris World Challenge Cup					2nd place, silver medalist(s)	
2025	World Championships	—N/a	16				
2025	Arthur Gander Memorial		5				
2026	Tashkent World Challenge Cup				1st place, gold medalist(s)	6	1st place, gold medalist(s)
2026	European Championships	10	10				8
2026	World Championships						
2026	Arthur Gander Memorial		3rd place, bronze medalist(s)				
2026	Swiss Cup	3rd place, bronze medalist(s)					
