= 2022 Swiss Cup Zürich =

Artistic gymnastics competition

- Location: Zürich, Switzerland
- Date: November 27, 2022

Medalists
gold medal	(United States) Addison Fatta & Yul Moldauer
silver medal	(Italy) Martina Maggio & Nicola Bartolini
bronze medal	(Turkey) Bilge Tarhan & Adem Asil

The 2022 Swiss Cup Zürich took place on November 27 in Zürich, Switzerland. It was the 34th iteration of the event.

== Participants ==
Team	WAG	MAG
Austria	Selina Kickinger	Vinzenz Höck
France	Morgane Osyssek-Reimer	Lucas Desanges
Italy	Martina Maggio	Nicola Bartolini
Japan	Chiaki Hatakeda	Kazuma Kaya
Netherlands	Eythora Thorsdottir	Casimir Schmidt
Spain	Laura Casabuena	Joel Plata
Switzerland 1	Lena Bickel	Noe Seifert
Switzerland 2	Anina Wildi	Taha Serhani
Turkey	Bilge Tarhan	Adem Asil
United States	Addison Fatta	Yul Moldauer

== Results ==
=== Prelims ===
Rank	Name	Round 1	Round 2	Total
1	Italy			56.050
1	Martina Maggio	13.900	13.500	27.400
1	Nicola Bartolini	14.450	14.200	28.650
2	United States			54.350
2	Addison Fatta	13.000	12.250	25.250
2	Yul Moldauer	14.650	14.450	29.100
3	Turkey			54.325
3	Bilge Tarhan	12.900	11.400	24.300
3	Adem Asil	14.900	15.125	30.025
4	Spain			54.150
4	Laura Casabuena	12.950	12.750	25.700
4	Joel Plata	13.850	14.600	28.450
5	Japan			53.975
5	Chiaki Hatakeda	13.225	12.500	25.725
5	Kazuma Kaya	13.650	14.600	28.250
6	Netherlands			53.200
6	Eythora Thorsdottir	13.050	12.450	25.500
6	Casimir Schmidt	13.900	13.800	27.700
7	France			51.925
7	Morgane Osyssek-Reimer	13.075	12.200	25.275
7	Lucas Desanges	13.250	13.400	26.650
8	Austria			51.550
8	Selina Kickinger	12.150	11.750	23.900
8	Vinzenz Höck	14.500	13.150	27.650
9	Switzerland 1			25.750
9	Lena Bickel	11.050		11.050
9	Noe Seifert	14.700		14.700
10	Switzerland 2			25.550
10	Anina Wildi	11.950		11.950
10	Taha Serhani	13.600		13.600

the team advanced to the semi-finals

=== Semi-finals ===
Rank	Name	Scores	Total
Italy vs Spain
1	Italy		27.800
1	Martina Maggio	13.250	27.800
1	Nicola Bartolini	14.550	27.800
2	Spain		26.525
2	Laura Casabuena	12.500	26.525
2	Joel Plata	14.025	26.525
USA vs Turkey
1	United States		26.850
1	Addison Fatta	12.500	26.850
1	Yul Moldauer	14.350	26.850
2	Turkey		24.550
2	Bilge Tarhan	10.500	24.550
2	Adem Asil	14.050	24.550

the team advanced to the finals

=== Finals ===
Rank	Name	Scores	Total
Championships
1st place, gold medalist(s)	United States		27.900
1st place, gold medalist(s)	Addison Fatta	13.150	27.900
1st place, gold medalist(s)	Yul Moldauer	14.750	27.900
2nd place, silver medalist(s)	Italy		27.750
2nd place, silver medalist(s)	Martina Maggio	13.200	27.750
2nd place, silver medalist(s)	Nicola Bartolini	14.550	27.750
Third place
3rd place, bronze medalist(s)	Turkey		27.550
3rd place, bronze medalist(s)	Bilge Tarhan	12.900	27.550
3rd place, bronze medalist(s)	Adem Asil	14.650	27.550
4	Spain		27.400
4	Laura Casabuena	13.250	27.400
4	Joel Plata	14.150	27.400
