= Tin Srbić =

Croatian artistic gymnast

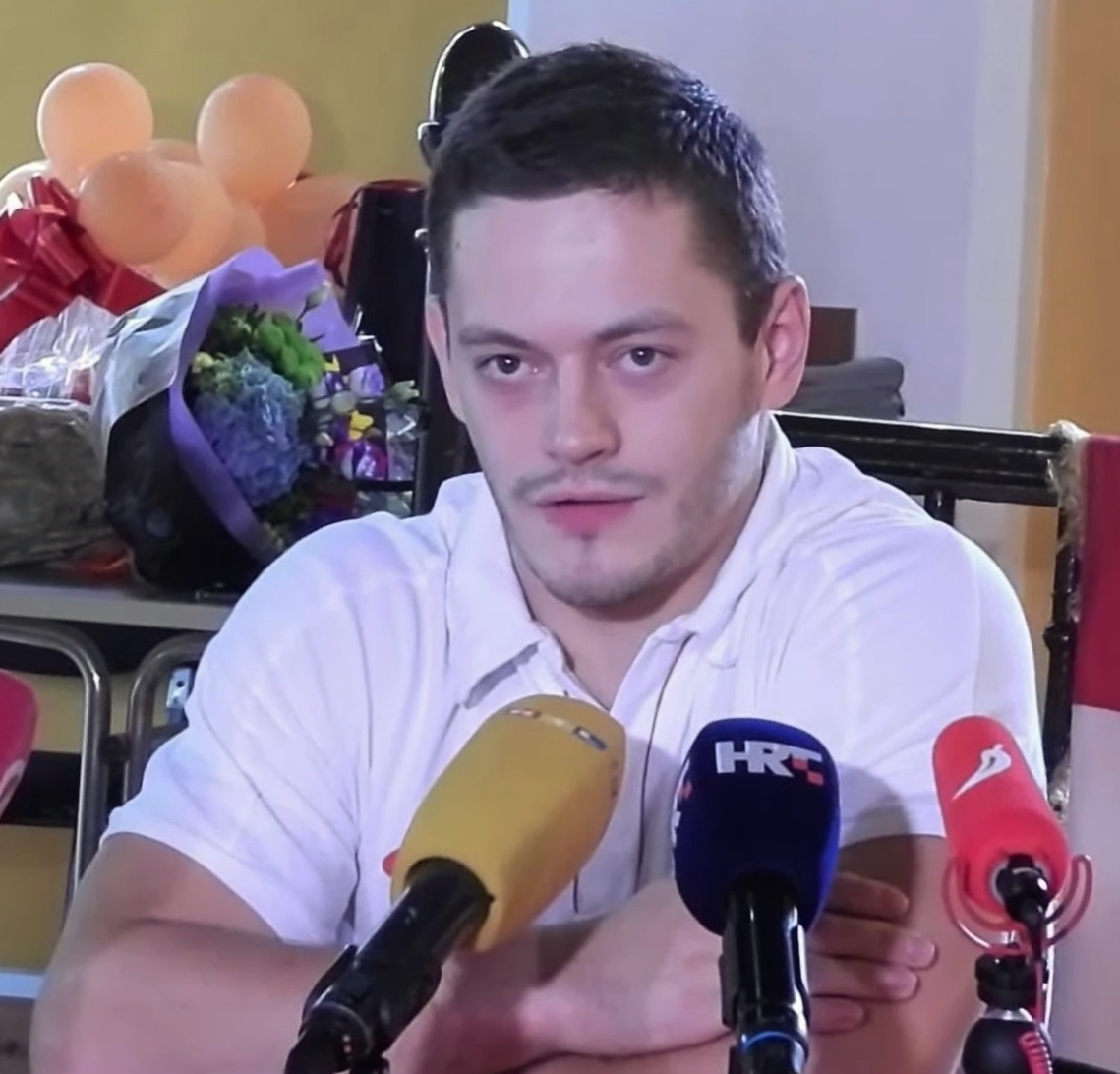
- Srbić interviewed in 2021

Personal information
- Born: 11 September 1996 (age 29) Zagreb, Croatia
- Height: 1.70 m (5 ft 7 in)

Gymnastics career
- Discipline: Men's artistic gymnastics
- Country represented: Croatia
- Club: ZTD Hrvatski Sokol
- Head coach: Lucijan Krce
Medal record
Representing Croatia
Artistic Gymnastics
Olympic Games
Silver medal – second place	2020 Tokyo	Horizontal bar
World Championships
Gold medal – first place	2017 Montreal	Horizontal bar
Silver medal – second place	2019 Stuttgart	Horizontal bar
Silver medal – second place	2023 Antwerp	Horizontal bar
European Championships
Gold medal – first place	2023 Antalya	Horizontal bar
Silver medal – second place	2019 Szczecin	Horizontal bar
Silver medal – second place	2020 Mersin	Horizontal bar
FIG World Cup
Event	1st	2nd	3rd
Apparatus World Cup	3	5	1
World Challenge Cup	7	0	3
Total	10	5	4

Tin Srbić (born 11 September 1996) is a Croatian artistic gymnast. He is the 2017 World champion on the horizontal bar and the first Croatian to win a gold medal at the World Artistic Gymnastics Championships. He is also the 2020 Olympic, 2019 World, and two-time European (2019, 2020) silver medalist on the horizontal bar. He is the second Croatian gymnast to win an Olympic medal, after Filip Ude. He has won nine gold medals in the FIG World Cup series.

== Early life ==
Srbić was born in Zagreb on 11 September 1996 to parents Saša and Karin Srbić, and he has an older sister named Tena. He began gymnastics when he was four years old at the ZTD Hrvatski Sokol club. When he was six, he broke two bones below his elbow after falling off the horizontal bar.

== Gymnastics career ==
=== 2016 ===
At the Baku World Cup, Srbić won his first FIG World Cup medal with the bronze medal on the horizontal bar. He won three more bronze medals at the Ljubljana, Osijek, and Szombathely World Cups.

=== 2017 ===
Srbić began the 2017 season at the Baku World Cup where he placed sixth in the horizontal bar final. Then at the Doha World Cup, he won the silver medal behind China's Xiao Ruoteng. In May, he won the gold medal on the horizontal bar at the Koper World Cup. Later that same month, he won another horizontal bar title at the Osijek World Cup. He then placed sixth at the Paris Challenge Cup. He won the gold medal on the horizontal bar at the World Championships, becoming the first Croatian gymnast to win a gold medal at the World Artistic Gymnastics Championships.

=== 2018 ===
Srbić began the 2018 season by winning the gold medal on the horizontal bar at the Doha World Cup. Then at the Osijek World Cup, he won the title on the horizontal bar by more than one point. He then finished sixth at the Paris Challenge Cup. At the World Championships, he finished fourth in the horizontal bar final with a score of 14.500, 0.033 behind the bronze medalist Sam Mikulak. After the World Championships, he won the silver medal behind Epke Zonderland at the Cottbus World Cup.

=== 2019 ===
At the Melbourne World Cup, Srbić finished seventh in the horizontal bar final after missing the handstand after his first skill. Then at the Baku World Cup, he won the silver medal on the horizontal bar, 0.033 behind Epke Zonderland. In March, he won the gold medal at the Doha World Cup with a score of 14.400. He then competed at the European Championships and won the silver medal behind Zonderland. At the Osijek World Cup, he finished sixth. He won the gold medal on the horizontal bar at the Croatian Championships by more than three points. Then in September, he won the gold medal at the Paris World Challenge Cup. At the World Championships, he opted to perform an easier routine due to a wrist injury, and he won the silver medal behind Brazilian Arthur Mariano. By qualifying for the horizontal bar event final, he earned an individual spot at the 2020 Olympic Games.

=== 2020 ===
Srbić won the gold medal on the horizontal bar at the Szombathely World Challenge Cup. At the Croatian Championships, he won the horizontal bar title by nearly four points. He then competed at the European Championships and won the silver medal behind Lithuanian Robert Tvorogal.

=== 2021 ===
Srbić won the gold medal on the horizontal bar at both the Varna and Osijek World Cups. He represented Croatia at the 2020 Summer Olympics. During the qualification round, he qualified for the horizontal bar final in third place with a score of 14.633, behind Daiki Hashimoto and Milad Karimi. In the event final, he upgraded his difficulty from a 6.2 to a 6.5 and earned a total score of 14.900. He ultimately won the silver medal behind Hashimoto. This was the second time that a Croatian gymnast won an Olympic medal, the first being Filip Ude's silver medal on the pommel horse at the 2008 Olympic Games. He decided to skip the World Championships to adjust his routines to the new 2022-2024 Code of Points.

=== 2022 ===
Srbić won the silver medal on the horizontal bar at the Cottbus World Cup behind American Brody Malone. He was the top qualifier for the horizontal bar final at the Doha World Cup, but he withdrew from the final due to a shoulder injury.

== Awards and honors ==
Srbić was named the Croatian Sportsman of the Year in 2017, 2019, 2021 and 2023.
