= Kazuki Minami =

Japanese artistic gymnast

- Born: 24 January 2000 (age 26)

Gymnastics career
- Discipline: Men's artistic gymnastics
- Country represented: Japan
- Club: Sendai University
- Head coaches: Hisashi Mizutori [national], Ryota Suzuki [club]
Medal record
Men's artistic gymnastics
Representing Japan
World Championships
Gold medal – first place	2023 Antwerp	Team
Silver medal – second place	2021 Kitakyushu	Floor Exercise
Silver medal – second place	2023 Antwerp	Floor Exercise
World University Games
Silver medal – second place	2021 Chengdu	Team
FIG World Cup
Event	1st	2nd	3rd
Apparatus World Cup	0	1	0
World Challenge Cup	2	0	0
Total	2	1	0

Kazuki Minami (born 24 January 2000) is a Japanese artistic gymnast. He turned senior in 2019 and became the 2019 World Cup gold medalist on Floor Exercise at Cottbus and Paris. At the 2021 World Artistic Gymnastics Championships he qualified for the floor exercise final in third place. In the final he took home the silver medal.

== Competitive history ==
Year	Event	Team	AA	FX	PH	SR	VT	PB	HB
2019	World Cup Cottbus			1st place, gold medalist(s)					
2019	World Cup Paris			1st place, gold medalist(s)					
2021
2021	World Championships			2nd place, silver medalist(s)					
2023
2023	Doha World Cup			2nd place, silver medalist(s)			6		
2025
2025	World Championships	—N/a		8			8		

== Eponymous skills ==
At the 2023 Doha World Cup Minami became the first gymnast to successfully perform a "double salto bwd with 7/2 t." on floor. The skill was added to the Code of Points and was given the value H (0.8).

Apparatus	Name	Description	Difficulty	Added to Code of Points
Floor Exercise	Minami	Double salto bwd. tucked with 7/2 t.	H (0.8)	2023 World Cup Doha
