= Kaito Sugimoto =

Japanese artistic gymnast

- Born: 17 March 2000 (age 26) Chiba, Japan

Gymnastics career
- Discipline: Men's artistic gymnastics
- Country represented: Japan
Medal record
Representing Japan
World Championships
Gold medal – first place	2023 Antwerp	Team
Bronze medal – third place	2023 Antwerp	Parallel Bars

Kaito Sugimoto (born 17 March 2000) is a Japanese artistic gymnast. He won the gold medal in the men's team event at the 2023 World Artistic Gymnastics Championships in Antwerp, Belgium. He also won the bronze medal in the parallel bars event.
