= Bilge Tarhan (gymnast) =

Turkish artistic gymnast

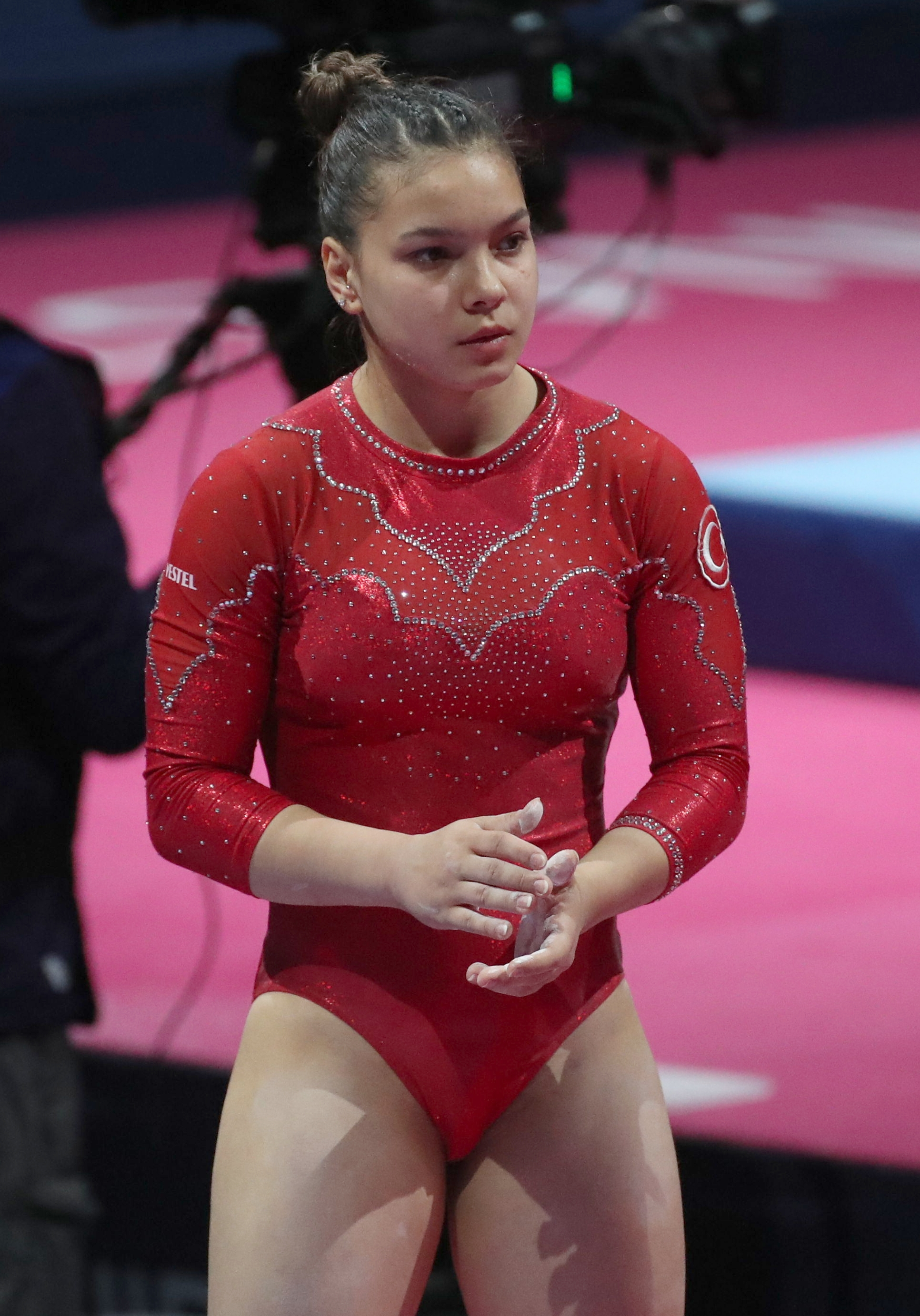
- Tarhan at the 2022 European Championships

Personal information
- Born: 20 May 2004 (age 22) Bolu, Turkey

Gymnastics career
- Discipline: Women's artistic gymnastics
- Country represented: Turkey
- Club: Bolu CSK
- Head coach: Ozgur Gumuslu
Medal record
Women's artistic gymnastics
Representing Turkey
Islamic Solidarity Games
Gold medal – first place	2021 Konya	Team
Silver medal – second place	2021 Konya	Vault
Bronze medal – third place	2021 Konya	Floor exercise
FIG World Cup
Event / 1st / 2nd / 3rd; World Challenge Cup / 0 / 1 / 0

Bilge Tarhan (born 20 May 2004) is a Turkish artistic gymnast. She won the team gold medal, vault silver medal, and floor exercise bronze medal at the 2021 Islamic Solidarity Games. She won a silver medal on the vault at the 2022 Mersin World Challenge Cup.

== Gymnastics career ==
=== Junior ===
Tarhan competed at the 2018 Junior Mediterranean Championships in Tunis, Tunisia, and won bronze medals on the vault and balance beam. The same year, she took gold medals in the all-around, vault, and balance beam and the bronze medal in the uneven bars at the Barborka Cup in Zabrze, Poland.

At the 2019 Stella Zakharova Cup in Kyiv, Ukraine, Tarhan won silver medals in the balance and with her teammates in the junior division. She then competed at the 2019 Junior World Championships alongside Ceren Biner and Dilara Yurtdaş, and they finished 21st in the team competition. Tarhan placed 40th in the individual all-around. She then competed at the 2019 European Youth Olympic Festival and qualified for the vault final, finishing eighth. She won the silver medal with her teammates at the 2019 Mediterranean Championships held in Cagliari, Italy.

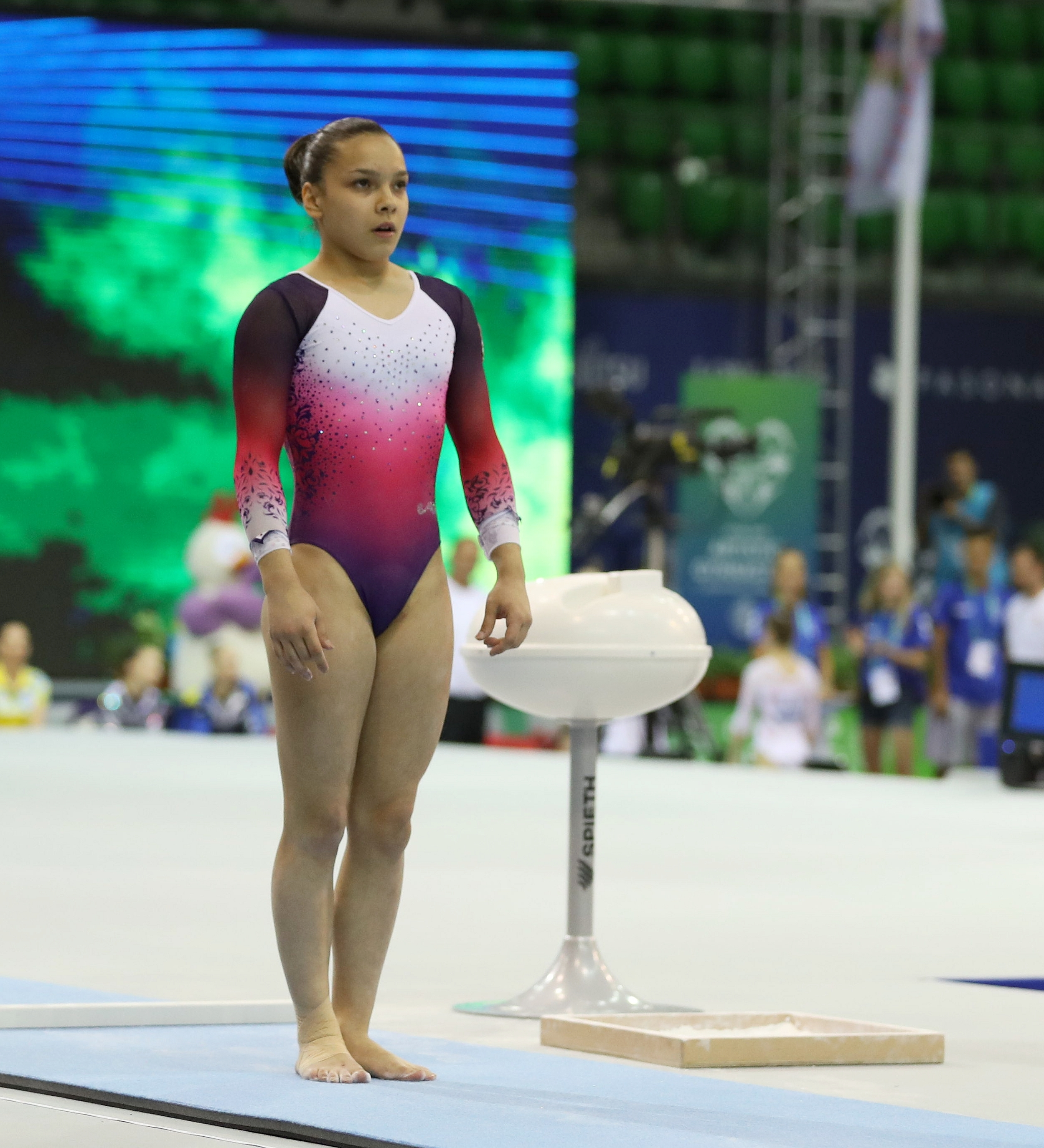
Vault

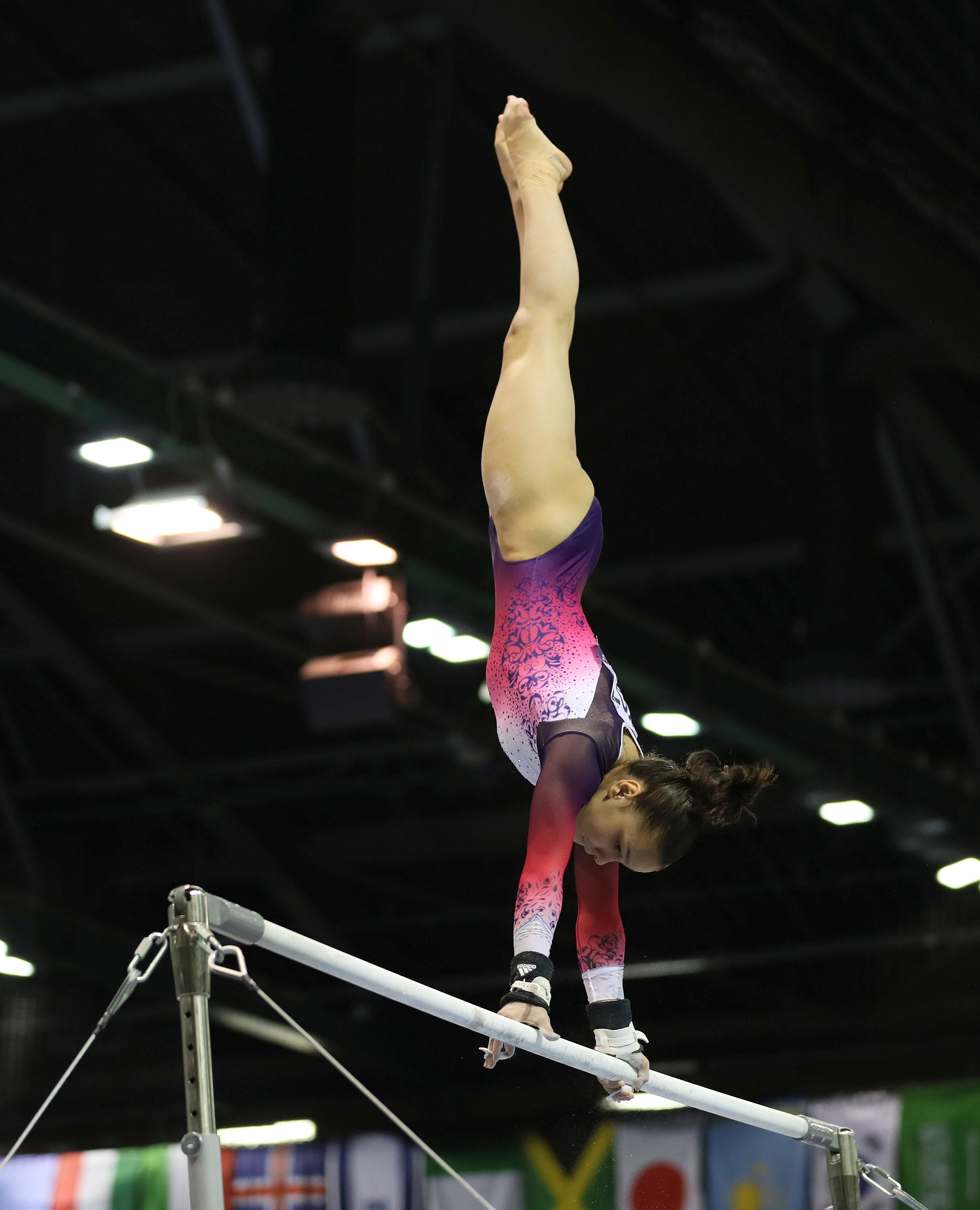
Uneven bars

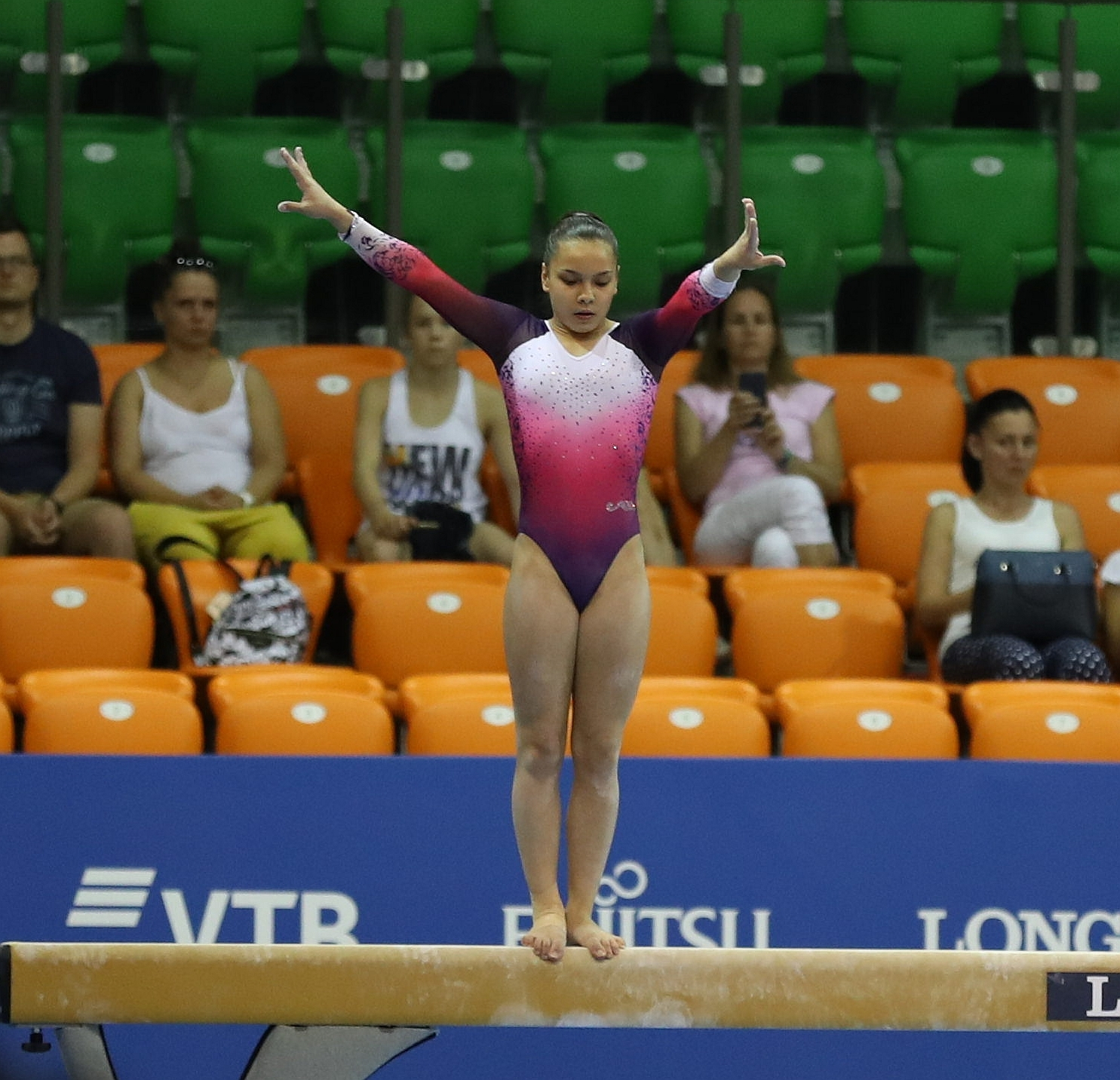
Balance beam

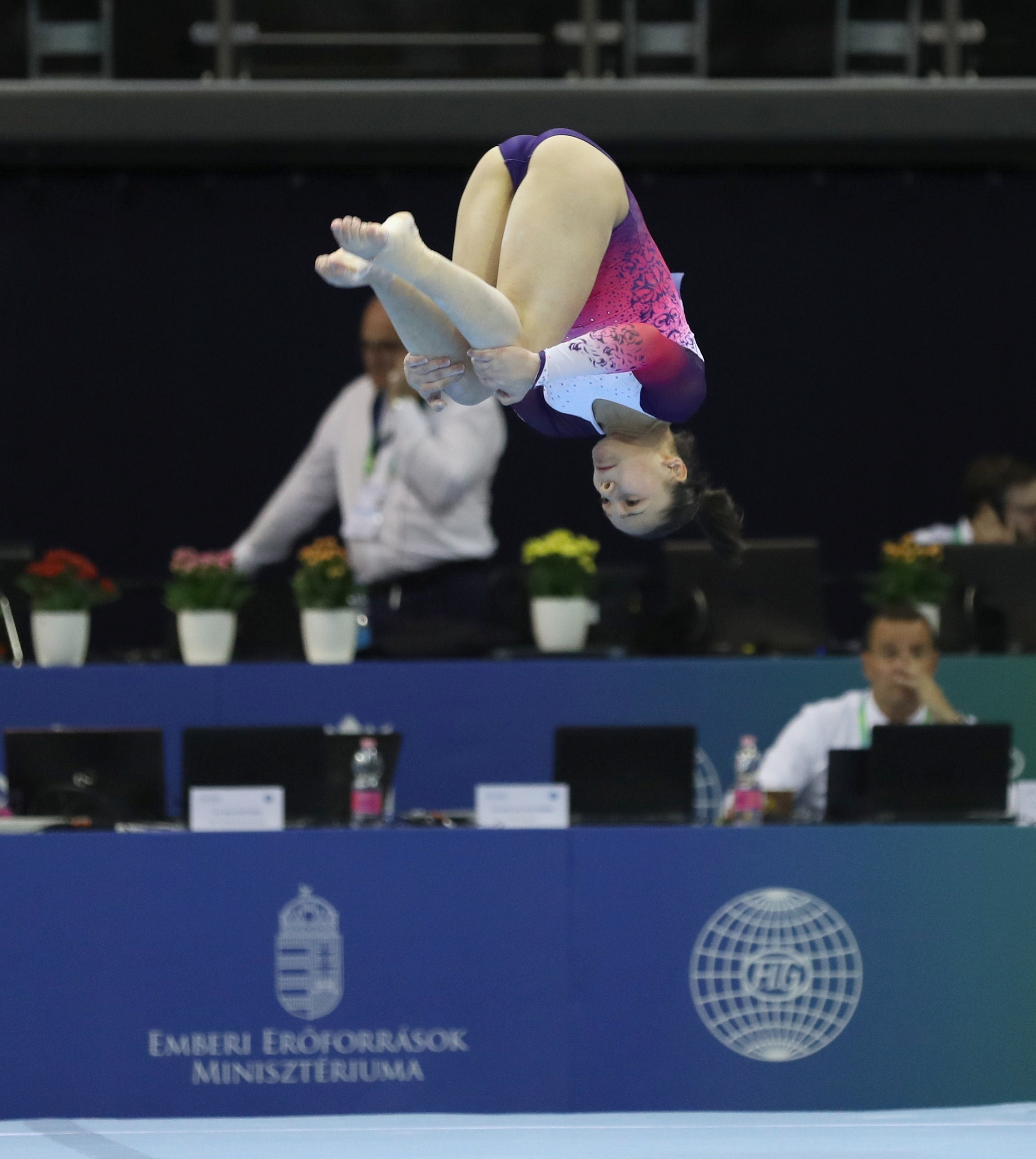
Floor exercise

Tarhan at the 2019 Junior World Championships

=== Senior ===
Tarhan became age-eligible for senior competitions in 2020. She competed at the 2020 European Championships alongside Cemre Kendirci, Göksu Üçtaş Şanlı, Ece Yağmur Yavuz, and Dilara Yurtdaş, and they finished fourth in the team final. Individually, she qualified for the balance beam final and placed sixth. She was also the first reserve for the vault final.

Tarhan finished fourth on the vault at the 2021 Cairo World Cup. She competed at the 2021 World Championships and finished 40th in the all-around during the qualification round.

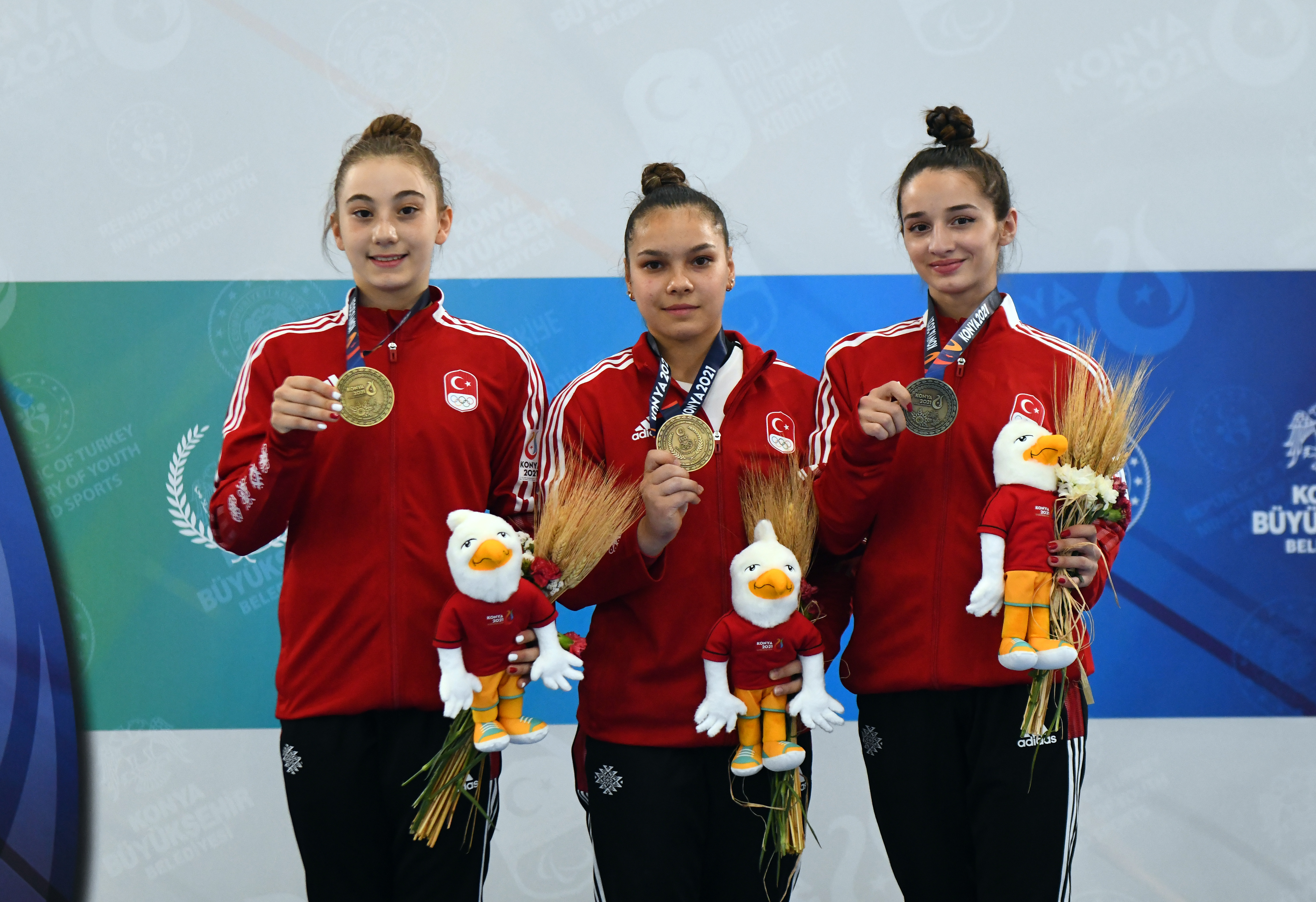
Tarhan (center) at the 2021 Islamic Solidarity Games

Tarhan competed at the 2021 Islamic Solidarity Games which were held in 2022 due to the COVID-19 pandemic and helped Turkey win team gold. Individually, she won a silver medal on the vault behind Oksana Chusovitina and a bronze medal on the floor exercise behind Aida Bauyrzhanova and Ominakhon Khalilova. She then competed at the 2022 Mersin World Challenge Cup and won a silver medal on the vault behind Teja Belak. She competed at the 2022 Swiss Cup Zürich, a mixed pairs event, alongside Adem Asil, and they won the bronze medal.

Tarhan finished fourth on the vault at the 2023 Baku World Cup. She qualified for the vault final at the 2023 European Championships and finished fifth. She then finished fourth in the vault final at the 2021 Summer World University Games, held in 2023 due to the COVID-19 pandemic. At the 2023 Osijek World Challenge Cup, she finished eighth in the vault final.

Tarhan finished eighth on the vault at the 2024 Antalya World Challenge Cup. At the 2025 Cottbus World Cup, she finished fifth on both the vault and the floor exercise.

== Personal life ==
As of 2023, Tarhan is a student at the Bolu Abant İzzet Baysal University. Her brother Bora Tarhan is also an artistic gymnast that has represented Turkey at international competitions including the 2019 European Youth Olympic Festival.
