= Gymnastics at the 2018 Asian Games – Men's rings =

Men's rings at the 2018 Asian Games
- Venue: Jakarta International Expo
- Date: 20–23 August 2018
- Competitors: 56 from 18 nations

Medalists
gold medal	Deng Shudi	China
silver medal	Shogo Nonomura	Japan
bronze medal	Chen Chih-yu	Chinese Taipei

The Men's rings competition at the 2018 Asian Games took place on 20 and 23 August 2018 at the Jakarta International Expo Hall D2.

== Schedule ==
All times are Western Indonesia Time (UTC+07:00)

Date	Time	Event
Monday, 20 August 2018	13:00	Qualification
Thursday, 23 August 2018	18:30	Final

== Results ==
Legend

- DNS — Did not start

=== Qualification ===
Rank	Athlete	Score
1	Jong Ryong-il (PRK)	14.850
2	Deng Shudi (CHN)	14.700
3	Chen Chih-yu (TPE)	14.650
4	Shogo Nonomura (JPN)	14.600
5	Park Min-soo (KOR)	14.550
6	Đặng Nam (VIE)	14.550
7	Sun Wei (CHN)	14.500
8	Ng Kiu Chung (HKG)	14.500
9	Xiao Ruoteng (CHN)	14.200
9	Lee Jae-seong (KOR)	14.200
11	Lin Chaopan (CHN)	14.150
12	Yu Chao-wei (TPE)	14.150
13	Dwi Samsul Arifin (INA)	14.150
14	Mehdi Ahmadkohani (IRI)	14.100
15	Kim Han-sol (KOR)	14.050
16	Fuya Maeno (JPN)	14.050
17	Kakeru Tanigawa (JPN)	14.000
18	Carlos Yulo (PHI)	13.900
19	Kenta Chiba (JPN)	13.900
20	Rakesh Kumar Patra (IND)	13.900
21	Han Jong-hyok (PRK)	13.700
22	Tang Chia-hung (TPE)	13.650
23	Phạm Phước Hưng (VIE)	13.600
24	Lee Jun-ho (KOR)	13.500
25	Mohammad Reza Khosronejad (IRI)	13.500
26	Lee Chih-kai (TPE)	13.350
27	Lê Thanh Tùng (VIE)	13.250
28	Akobir Khamrokulov (UZB)	13.250
29	Akim Mussayev (KAZ)	13.200
30	Rasuljon Abdurakhimov (UZB)	13.200
31	Chau Jern Rong (MAS)	13.100
32	Ashish Kumar (IND)	13.050
33	Gaurav Kumar (IND)	13.000
33	Ilyas Azizov (KAZ)	13.000
35	Ri Yong-min (PRK)	13.000
36	Tikumporn Surintornta (THA)	12.850
37	Anton Fokin (UZB)	12.750
38	Saman Madani (IRI)	12.700
39	Agus Adi Prayoko (INA)	12.700
40	Anawin Phothong (THA)	12.700
41	Yogeshwar Singh (IND)	12.650
42	Azroy Amierol Jaafar (MAS)	12.600
42	Abdulla Azimov (UZB)	12.600
44	Loo Phay Xing (MAS)	12.250
45	Zul Bahrin Mat Asri (MAS)	12.150
46	Yerbol Jantykov (KAZ)	11.850
47	Nattipong Aeadwong (THA)	11.800
48	Agung Suci Tantio Akbar (INA)	11.650
49	Jag Timbang (PHI)	11.600
50	Đỗ Vũ Hưng (VIE)	11.400
51	Altansükhiin Enkhtulga (MGL)	11.400
52	Tissanupan Wichianpradit (THA)	11.250
53	Roman Pak (KGZ)	9.700
54	Asad Aziz Jooma (PAK)	6.250
—	Muhammad Aprizal (INA)	DNS
—	Saeid Reza Keikha (IRI)	DNS

=== Final ===
Rank	Athlete	Score
1st place, gold medalist(s)	Deng Shudi (CHN)	14.750
2nd place, silver medalist(s)	Shogo Nonomura (JPN)	14.625
3rd place, bronze medalist(s)	Chen Chih-yu (TPE)	14.600
4	Ng Kiu Chung (HKG)	14.550
5	Đặng Nam (VIE)	14.500
6	Sun Wei (CHN)	14.375
7	Park Min-soo (KOR)	14.150
8	Jong Ryong-il (PRK)	14.075
