= Gymnastics at the 2021 SEA Games – Men's horizontal bar =

Gymnastics – Men's horizontal bar at the 2021 SEA Games
- Venue: Quần Ngựa Sports Palace
- Date: 16 May 2022
- Competitors: 8 from 5 nations

Medalists
gold medal	Carlos Yulo (PHI); Đinh Phương Thành (VIE)
bronze medal	Lê Thanh Tùng (VIE)

The men's horizontal bar competition for artistic gymnastics at the 2021 SEA Games in Vietnam was held from 16 May 2022 at Quần Ngựa Sports Palace.

== Schedule ==
All times are in Indochina Time (UTC+7).

Date	Time	Round
Friday, 13 May	10:00	Qualification
Monday, 16 May	14:00	Final

== Final ==
Rank	Name	Difficulty	Execution	Penalty	Total
1st place, gold medalist(s)	Đinh Phương Thành (VIE)				13.867
1st place, gold medalist(s)	Carlos Yulo (PHI)				13.867
3rd place, bronze medalist(s)	Lê Thanh Tùng (VIE)				13.433
4	Juancho Miguel Besana (PHI)				12.100
5	Sim Boon Pin, Robin (SGP)				11.567
6	Jer Rong Chong (SGP)				11.533
7	Suphacheep Baobenmad (THA)				10.767
8	Teoh Chuen Feng (MAS)				10.367
