= Gymnastics at the 2018 Asian Games – Men's horizontal bar =

Men's horizontal bar at the 2018 Asian Games
- Venue: Jakarta International Expo
- Date: 20–24 August 2018
- Competitors: 58 from 19 nations

Medalists
gold medal	Tang Chia-hung	Chinese Taipei
silver medal	Sun Wei	China
bronze medal	Xiao Ruoteng	China

The men's horizontal bar competition at the 2018 Asian Games took place on 20 and 24 August 2018 at the Jakarta International Expo Hall D2.

== Schedule ==
All times are Western Indonesia Time (UTC+07:00)

Date	Time	Event
Monday, 20 August 2018	13:00	Qualification
Friday, 24 August 2018	18:30	Final

== Results ==
Legend

- DNS — Did not start

=== Qualification ===
Rank	Athlete	Score
1	Tang Chia-hung (TPE)	14.550
2	Xiao Ruoteng (CHN)	14.550
3	Sun Wei (CHN)	14.500
4	Lin Chaopan (CHN)	14.450
5	Kenta Chiba (JPN)	14.150
6	Lee Jun-ho (KOR)	14.100
7	Kakeru Tanigawa (JPN)	14.000
8	Shogo Nonomura (JPN)	13.750
9	Milad Karimi (KAZ)	13.750
10	Lê Thanh Tùng (VIE)	13.550
11	Han Jong-hyok (PRK)	13.550
12	Deng Shudi (CHN)	13.500
13	Shek Wai Hung (HKG)	13.300
14	Anton Fokin (UZB)	13.150
15	Phạm Phước Hưng (VIE)	13.150
16	Kim Han-sol (KOR)	13.000
17	Shiao Yu-jan (TPE)	12.950
18	Đinh Phương Thành (VIE)	12.950
19	Tomomasa Hasegawa (JPN)	12.950
20	Siddharth Verma (IND)	12.850
20	Rasuljon Abdurakhimov (UZB)	12.850
22	Chau Jern Rong (MAS)	12.850
23	Jim Man Hin (HKG)	12.700
24	Park Min-soo (KOR)	12.700
25	Loo Phay Xing (MAS)	12.650
26	Mohammad Reza Khosronejad (IRI)	12.400
27	Mehdi Ahmadkohani (IRI)	12.350
28	Yerbol Jantykov (KAZ)	12.350
29	Abdulla Azimov (UZB)	12.300
30	Gaurav Kumar (IND)	12.250
31	Saman Madani (IRI)	12.200
31	Azroy Amierol Jaafar (MAS)	12.200
33	Tikumporn Surintornta (THA)	12.200
34	Muhammad Try Saputra (INA)	12.100
35	Lee Hyeok-jung (KOR)	12.100
36	Carlos Yulo (PHI)	12.050
37	Ashish Kumar (IND)	11.900
38	Yu Chao-wei (TPE)	11.850
39	Jag Timbang (PHI)	11.800
40	Khusniddin Abdusamatov (UZB)	11.750
41	Dwi Samsul Arifin (INA)	11.700
42	Akim Mussayev (KAZ)	11.600
43	Yogeshwar Singh (IND)	11.550
44	Ri Yong-min (PRK)	11.500
45	Jong Ryong-il (PRK)	11.300
46	Nattipong Aeadwong (THA)	11.300
47	Agung Suci Tantio Akbar (INA)	11.300
48	Lee Chih-kai (TPE)	11.300
49	Jamorn Prommanee (THA)	11.050
50	Asad Aziz Jooma (PAK)	10.900
51	Ilyas Azizov (KAZ)	10.750
52	Ahmed Nabil Mosa (QAT)	10.600
53	Altansükhiin Enkhtulga (MGL)	10.150
54	Zul Bahrin Mat Asri (MAS)	9.700
55	Tissanupan Wichianpradit (THA)	9.700
—	Muhammad Aprizal (INA)	DNS
—	Saeid Reza Keikha (IRI)	DNS
—	Roman Pak (KGZ)	DNS

=== Final ===
Rank	Athlete	Score
1st place, gold medalist(s)	Tang Chia-hung (TPE)	14.725
2nd place, silver medalist(s)	Sun Wei (CHN)	14.500
3rd place, bronze medalist(s)	Xiao Ruoteng (CHN)	14.225
4	Lee Jun-ho (KOR)	14.200
5	Lê Thanh Tùng (VIE)	13.300
6	Kenta Chiba (JPN)	13.250
7	Kakeru Tanigawa (JPN)	12.750
8	Milad Karimi (KAZ)	11.200
