= Gymnastics at the 2015 SEA Games – Men's artistic team =

Gymnastics – Men's artistic team at the 2015 SEA Games
- Venue: Bishan Sports Hall
- Date: 6 June 2015
- Competitors: 37 from 8 nations

Medalists
gold medal	Đặng Nam; Hoàng Cường; Lê Thanh Tùng; Đinh Phương Thành; Phạm Phước Hưng; Đỗ Vũ Hưng	Vietnam
silver medal	Tissanupan Wichianpradit; Robert Tee Kriangkum; Ratthasat Kanboon; Jamorn Rommanee; Weena Chokpaoumpai; Rartchawat Kaewpanya	Thailand
bronze medal	Timothy Tay; Terry Tay; Gabriel Gan; Hoe Wah Toon; Aizat Muhammad Jufrie; Gregory Gan	Singapore

The Men's artistic team competition at the 2015 SEA Games was held on 6 June 2015 at the Bishan Sports Hall in Singapore. The competition is divided to 2 subdivisions. The first subdivision took place at 09:00 Singapore Standard Time (UTC+8); followed by the second at 15:00 respectively.

The team competition also served as qualification for the individual all-around and event finals.

== Schedule ==
All times are Singapore Standard Time (UTC+8).

Date	Time	Event
Saturday, 6 June 2015	09:00	Final

== Results ==
Source: Results - Men's artistic team

Rank	Team	Floor (gymnastics)	Pommel horse	Rings (gymnastics)	Vault (gymnastics)	Parallel bars	Horizontal bar	Total
1st place, gold medalist(s)	Vietnam (VIE)	58.700	55.150	57.650	58.700	60.400	54.100	344.700
	Đặng Nam	14.300	13.300	15.250	14.150	13.650	12.100	82.750
	Hoàng Cường	14.350	13.100	13.500	14.950	15.200	13.600	84.700
	Lê Thanh Tùng	14.850	13.900	14.100	15.300	12.650	13.200	84.000
	Đinh Phương Thành	14.700	14.300	13.100	14.300	15.450	13.750	85.600
	Phạm Phước Hưng	14.800	13.650	14.800	14.000	16.100	13.550	86.900
	Đỗ Vũ Hưng							0.000
2nd place, silver medalist(s)	Thailand (THA)	54.000	55.400	49.100	56.450	54.850	48.350	318.150
	Tissanupan Wichianpradit	13.000	13.350	11.550	13.250	13.200	12.900	77.250
	Robert Tee Kriangkum							0.000
	Ratthasat Kanboon	13.650	12.400	11.650	14.400	12.650	11.350	76.100
	Jamorn Prommanee	14.000	14.550	12.650	13.400	14.000	12.000	80.600
	Weena Chokpaoumpai	13.350	12.850	12.750	14.500	13.550	12.100	79.100
	Rartchawat Kaewpanya	12.500	14.650	12.050	14.150	14.100	10.750	78.200
3rd place, bronze medalist(s)	Singapore (SIN)	54.500	51.550	50.200	56.600	53.500	51.750	318.100
	Timothy Tay	13.250	12.800	11.100	13.600	13.700	13.100	77.550
	Terry Tay	13.950	9.850	13.300	14.500	13.050	11.550	76.200
	Gabriel Gan	13.200	14.250	12.650	13.650	12.700	12.900	79.350
	Hoe Wah Toon	14.100			14.400			28.500
	Aizat Muhammad Jufrie	12.950	10.950	13.050	14.050	13.050	13.150	77.200
	Gregory Gan		13.550	11.200		13.700	12.600	51.050
4	Indonesia (INA)	53.500	43.150	44.500	55.750	52.300	45.400	294.600
	Muhammad Try Saputra	13.700	12.650			14.000	12.600	52.950
	Ferrous One Willyodac	14.500		10.700	13.500	12.850	12.400	63.950
	Agus Adi Prayoko	13.000	9.100	12.450	14.850	12.900	9.750	72.050
	Ronny Sabputra		11.450	11.500	14.000			36.950
	Trisna Ramdhany	12.300	9.950	9.850	13.400	12.550	10.650	68.700
5	Philippines (PHI)	54.100	33.950	45.400	55.600	46.350	43.100	278.500
	Reyland Cappelan	14.400	5.850	10.800	14.650	10.750	10.400	66.850
	Macker-Brandon Judulang	12.400	6.800	11.300	13.550	11.900	10.200	66.150
	Jan Gwynn Timbang	13.450	11.000	11.500	13.700	11.000	11.000	71.650
	Rafael Iii Ablaza	13.850	10.300	11.800	13.700	12.700	11.500	73.850
6	Myanmar (MYA)	48.200	28.500	36.700	52.150	41.350	17.650	224.550
	Ko Thura Ko		8.750	8.950		10.800	5.850	34.350
	Zaw Aung Khant	12.700	2.700	9.350	14.050	10.350		49.150
	Oo Myo Zaw	12.500	2.600	4.650	12.800	9.950	5.600	48.100
	Ha Thi	12.500	9.050	9.200	12.700	9.850		53.300
	Aung Zin Lin	10.500	8.000	9.200	12.600	10.250	6.200	56.750
7	Malaysia (MAS)	36.400	24.150	25.200	39.750	25.200	36.200	186.900
	Jeremiah Loo Phay Xing	12.650	12.650	12.600	12.850	13.300	13.200	77.250
	Mohd Hamzarudin Nordin	10.850		12.600	12.400			35.850
	Mohd Abd Azim Othman		11.500		14.500		11.650	37.650
	Zul Bahrin Mat Asrl	12.900				11.900	11.350	36.150
Individuals
	Rim Sam (CAM)	11.900			12.550			24.450

== Qualification results ==
=== Individual all-around ===
Pos.	Gymnast	Floor (gymnastics)	Pommel horse	Rings (gymnastics)	Vault (gymnastics)	Parallel bars	Horizontal bar	Total	Notes
1	Phạm Phước Hưng (VIE)	14.800	13.650	14.800	14.000	16.100	13.550	86.900	Q
2	Đinh Phương Thành (VIE)	14.700	14.300	13.100	14.300	15.450	13.750	85.600	Q
3	Hoàng Cường (VIE)	14.350	13.100	13.500	14.950	15.200	13.600	84.700	
4	Lê Thanh Tùng (VIE)	14.850	13.900	14.100	15.300	12.650	13.200	84.000	
5	Đặng Nam (VIE)	14.300	13.300	15.250	14.150	13.650	12.100	82.750	
6	Jamorn Prommanee (THA)	14.000	14.550	12.650	13.400	14.000	12.000	80.600	Q
7	Gabriel Gan (SIN)	13.200	14.250	12.650	13.650	12.700	12.900	79.350	Q
8	Weena Chokpaoumpai (THA)	13.350	12.850	12.750	14.500	13.550	12.100	79.100	Q
9	Rartchawat Kaewpanya (THA)	12.500	14.650	12.050	14.150	14.100	10.750	78.200	
10	Timothy Tay (SIN)	13.250	12.800	11.100	13.600	13.700	13.100	77.550	Q
11	Tissanupan Wichianpradit (THA)	13.000	13.350	11.550	13.250	13.200	12.900	77.250	
12	Jeremiah Loo Phay Xing (MAS)	12.650	12.650	12.600	12.850	13.300	13.200	77.250	Q
13	Aizat Muhammad Jufrie (SIN)	12.950	10.950	13.050	14.050	13.050	13.150	77.200	
14	Terry Tay (SIN)	13.950	9.850	13.300	14.500	13.050	11.550	76.200	
15	Ratthasat Kanboon (THA)	13.650	12.400	11.650	14.400	12.650	11.350	76.100	
16	Rafael Iii Ablaza (PHI)	13.850	10.300	11.800	13.700	12.700	11.500	73.850	Q
17	Agus Adi Prayoko (INA)	13.000	9.100	12.450	14.850	12.900	9.750	72.050	Q
18	Jan Gwynn Timbang (PHI)	13.450	11.000	11.500	13.700	11.000	11.000	71.650	Q
19	Trisna Ramdhany (INA)	12.300	9.950	9.850	13.400	12.550	10.650	68.700	Q
20	Reyland Cappelan (PHI)	14.400	5.850	10.800	14.650	10.750	10.400	66.850	
21	Macker-Brandon Judulang (PHI)	12.400	6.800	11.300	13.550	11.900	10.200	66.150	
22	Aung Zin Lin (MYA)	10.500	8.000	9.200	12.600	10.250	6.200	56.750	Q
23	Oo Myo Zaw (MYA)	12.500	2.600	4.650	12.800	9.950	5.600	48.100	Q

=== Floor ===
Pos.	Gymnast	Floor (gymnastics)	Notes
1	Lê Thanh Tùng (VIE)	14.850	Q
2	Phạm Phước Hưng (VIE)	14.800	Q
3	Đinh Phương Thành (VIE)	14.700	
4	Ferrous One Willyodac (INA)	14.500	Q
5	Reyland Cappelan (PHI)	14.400	Q
6	Hoàng Cường (VIE)	14.350	
7	Đặng Nam (VIE)	14.300	
8	Hoe Wah Toon (SIN)	14.100	Q
9	Jamorn Prommanee (THA)	14.000	Q
10	Terry Tay (SIN)	13.950	Q
11	Rafael Iii Ablaza (PHI)	13.850	Q
12	Muhammad Try Saputra (INA)	13.700	R1
13	Ratthasat Kanboon (THA)	13.650	R2
14	Jan Gwynn Timbang (PHI)	13.450	
15	Weena Chokpaoumpai (THA)	13.350	
16	Timothy Tay (SIN)	13.250	
17	Gabriel Gan (SIN)	13.200	
18	Tissanupan Wichianpradit (THA)	13.000	
19	Agus Adi Prayoko (INA)	13.000	
20	Aizat Muhammad Jufrie (SIN)	12.950	
21	Zul Bahrin Mat Asrl (MAS)	12.900	R3
22	Zaw Aung Khant (MYA)	12.700	
23	Jeremiah Loo Phay Xing (MAS)	12.650	
24	Ha Thi (MYA)	12.500	
25	Oo Myo Zaw (MYA)	12.500	
26	Rartchawat Kaewpanya (THA)	12.500	
27	Macker-Brandon Judulang (PHI)	12.400	
28	Trisna Ramdhany (INA)	12.300	
29	Rim Sam (CAM)	11.900	
30	Mohd Hamzarudin Nordin (MAS)	10.850	
31	Aung Zin Lin (MYA)	10.500	

=== Pommel horse ===
Pos.	Gymnast	Pommel horse	Notes
1	Rartchawat Kaewpanya (THA)	14.650	Q
2	Jamorn Prommanee (THA)	14.550	Q
3	Đinh Phương Thành (VIE)	14.300	Q
4	Gabriel Gan (SIN)	14.250	Q
5	Lê Thanh Tùng (VIE)	13.900	Q
6	Phạm Phước Hưng (VIE)	13.650	
7	Gregory Gan (SIN)	13.550	Q
8	Tissanupan Wichianpradit (THA)	13.350	
9	Đặng Nam (VIE)	13.300	
10	Hoàng Cường (VIE)	13.100	
11	Weena Chokpaoumpai (THA)	12.850	
12	Timothy Tay (SIN)	12.800	
13	Muhammad Try Saputra (INA)	12.650	Q
14	Jeremiah Loo Phay Xing (MAS)	12.650	Q
15	Ratthasat Kanboon (THA)	12.400	
16	Mohd Abd Azim Othman (MAS)	11.500	R1
17	Ronny Sabputra (INA)	11.450	R2
18	Jan Gwynn Timbang (PHI)	11.000	R3
19	Aizat Muhammad Jufrie (SIN)	10.950	
20	Rafael Iii Ablaza (PHI)	10.300	
21	Trisna Ramdhany (INA)	9.950	
22	Terry Tay (SIN)	9.850	
23	Agus Adi Prayoko (INA)	9.100	
24	Ha Thi (MYA)	9.050	
25	Ko Thura Ko (MYA)	8.750	
26	Aung Zin Lin (MYA)	8.000	
27	Macker-Brandon Judulang (PHI)	6.800	
28	Reyland Cappelan (PHI)	5.850	
29	Zaw Aung Khant (MYA)	2.700	
30	Oo Myo Zaw (MYA)	2.600	

=== Rings ===
Pos.	Gymnast	Rings (gymnastics)	Notes
1	Đặng Nam (VIE)	15.250	Q
2	Phạm Phước Hưng (VIE)	14.800	Q
3	Lê Thanh Tùng (VIE)	14.100	
4	Hoàng Cường (VIE)	13.500	
5	Terry Tay (SIN)	13.300	Q
6	Đinh Phương Thành (VIE)	13.100	
7	Aizat Muhammad Jufrie (SIN)	13.050	Q
8	Weena Chokpaoumpai (THA)	12.750	Q
9	Gabriel Gan (SIN)	12.650	
10	Jamorn Prommanee (THA)	12.650	Q
11	Jeremiah Loo Phay Xing (MAS)	12.600	Q
12	Mohd Hamzarudin Nordin (MAS)	12.600	Q
13	Agus Adi Prayoko (INA)	12.450	R1
14	Rartchawat Kaewpanya (THA)	12.050	
15	Rafael Iii Ablaza (PHI)	11.800	R2
16	Ratthasat Kanboon (THA)	11.650	
17	Tissanupan Wichianpradit (THA)	11.550	
18	Jan Gwynn Timbang (PHI)	11.500	R3
19	Ronny Sabputra (INA)	11.500	
20	Macker-Brandon Judulang (PHI)	11.300	
21	Gregory Gan (SIN)	11.200	
22	Timothy Tay (SIN)	11.100	
23	Reyland Cappelan (PHI)	10.800	
24	Ferrous One Willyodac (INA)	10.700	
25	Trisna Ramdhany (INA)	9.850	
26	Zaw Aung Khant (MYA)	9.350	
27	Ha Thi (MYA)	9.200	
28	Aung Zin Lin (MYA)	9.200	
29	Ko Thura Ko (MYA)	8.950	
30	Oo Myo Zaw (MYA)	4.650	

=== Vault ===
Pos.	Gymnast	Score 1	Score 2	Total	Notes
1	Agus Adi Prayoko (INA)	14.850	14.850	14.850	Q
2	Hoàng Cường (VIE)	14.950	14.450	14.700	Q
3	Reyland Cappelan (PHI)	14.650	14.550	14.600	Q
4	Lê Thanh Tùng (VIE)	15.300	13.600	14.450	Q
5	Hoe Wah Toon (SIN)	14.400	14.500	14.450	Q
6	Mohd Abd Azim Othman (MAS)	14.500	14.300	14.400	Q
7	Terry Tay (SIN)	14.500	14.000	14.250	Q
8	Weena Chokpaoumpai (THA)	14.500	13.900	14.200	Q
9	Đặng Nam (VIE)	14.150	14.200	14.175	
10	Aizat Muhammad Jufrie (SIN)	14.050	13.950	14.000	
11	Ratthasat Kanboon (THA)	14.400	13.300	13.850	R1
12	Tissanupan Wichianpradit (THA)	13.250	14.250	13.750	
13	Zaw Aung Khant (MYA)	14.050	12.950	13.500	R2
14	Rafael Iii Ablaza (PHI)	13.700	13.100	13.400	R3
15	Rim Sam (CAM)	12.550	13.200	12.875	
16	Oo Myo Zaw (MYA)	12.800	12.650	12.725	
17	Mohd Hamzarudin Nordin (MAS)	12.400	12.850	12.625	
18	Ha Thi (MYA)	12.700	12.400	12.550	
−	Đinh Phương Thành (VIE)	14.300	−	14.300	
−	Rartchawat Kaewpanya (THA)	14.150	−	14.150	
−	Phạm Phước Hưng (VIE)	14.000	−	14.000	
−	Ronny Sabputra (INA)	14.000	−	14.000	
−	Jan Gwynn Timbang (PHI)	13.700	−	13.700	
−	Gabriel Gan (SIN)	13.650	−	13.650	
−	Timothy Tay (SIN)	13.600	−	13.600	
−	Macker-Brandon Judulang (PHI)	13.550	−	13.550	
−	Ferrous One Willyodac (INA)	13.500	−	13.500	
−	Jamorn Prommanee (THA)	13.400	−	13.400	
−	Trisna Ramdhany (INA)	13.400	−	13.400	
−	Jeremiah Loo Phay Xing (MAS)	12.850	−	12.850	
−	Aung Zin Lin (MYA)	12.600	−	12.600	

=== Parallel bars ===
Pos.	Gymnast	Parallel bars	Notes
1	Phạm Phước Hưng (VIE)	16.100	Q
2	Đinh Phương Thành (VIE)	15.450	Q
3	Hoàng Cường (VIE)	15.200	
4	Rartchawat Kaewpanya (THA)	14.100	Q
5	Muhammad Try Saputra (INA)	14.000	Q
6	Jamorn Prommanee (THA)	14.000	Q
7	Gregory Gan (SIN)	13.700	Q
8	Timothy Tay (SIN)	13.700	Q
9	Đặng Nam (VIE)	13.650	
10	Weena Chokpaoumpai (THA)	13.550	
11	Jeremiah Loo Phay Xing (MAS)	13.300	Q
12	Tissanupan Wichianpradit (THA)	13.200	
13	Aizat Muhammad Jufrie (SIN)	13.050	
14	Terry Tay (SIN)	13.050	
15	Agus Adi Prayoko (INA)	12.900	R1
16	Ferrous One Willyodac (INA)	12.850	
17	Rafael Iii Ablaza (PHI)	12.700	R2
18	Gabriel Gan (SIN)	12.700	
19	Ratthasat Kanboon (THA)	12.650	
20	Lê Thanh Tùng (VIE)	12.650	
21	Trisna Ramdhany (INA)	12.550	
22	Zul Bahrin Mat Asrl (MAS)	11.900	R3
23	Macker-Brandon Judulang (PHI)	11.900	
24	Jan Gwynn Timbang (PHI)	11.000	
25	Ko Thura Ko (MYA)	10.800	
26	Reyland Cappelan (PHI)	10.750	
27	Zaw Aung Khant (MYA)	10.350	
28	Aung Zin Lin (MYA)	10.250	
29	Oo Myo Zaw (MYA)	9.950	
30	Ha Thi (MYA)	9.850	

=== High bar ===
Pos.	Gymnast	Horizontal bar	Notes
1	Đinh Phương Thành (VIE)	13.750	Q
2	Hoàng Cường (VIE)	13.600	Q
3	Phạm Phước Hưng (VIE)	13.550	
4	Jeremiah Loo Phay Xing (MAS)	13.200	Q
5	Lê Thanh Tùng (VIE)	13.200	
6	Aizat Muhammad Jufrie (SIN)	13.150	Q
7	Timothy Tay (SIN)	13.100	Q
8	Gabriel Gan (SIN)	12.900	
9	Tissanupan Wichianpradit (THA)	12.900	Q
10	Gregory Gan (SIN)	12.600	
11	Muhammad Try Saputra (INA)	12.600	Q
12	Ferrous One Willyodac (INA)	12.400	Q
13	Đặng Nam (VIE)	12.100	
14	Weena Chokpaoumpai (THA)	12.100	R1
15	Jamorn Prommanee (THA)	12.000	
16	Mohd Abd Azim Othman (MAS)	11.650	R2
17	Terry Tay (SIN)	11.550	
18	Rafael Iii Ablaza (PHI)	11.500	R3
19	Zul Bahrin Mat Asrl (MAS)	11.350	
20	Ratthasat Kanboon (THA)	11.350	
21	Jan Gwynn Timbang (PHI)	11.000	
22	Rartchawat Kaewpanya (THA)	10.750	
23	Trisna Ramdhany (INA)	10.650	
24	Reyland Cappelan (PHI)	10.400	
25	Macker-Brandon Judulang (PHI)	10.200	
26	Agus Adi Prayoko (INA)	9.750	
27	Aung Zin Lin (MYA)	6.200	
28	Ko Thura Ko (MYA)	5.850	
29	Oo Myo Zaw (MYA)	5.600	
