= Gymnastics at the 2018 Asian Games – Men's vault =

Men's vault at the 2018 Asian Games
- Venue: Jakarta International Expo
- Date: 20–24 August 2018
- Competitors: 24 from 17 nations

Medalists
gold medal	Shek Wai Hung	Hong Kong
silver medal	Kim Han-sol	South Korea
bronze medal	Agus Adi Prayoko	Indonesia

The men's vault competition at the 2018 Asian Games took place on 20 and 24 August 2018 at the Jakarta International Expo Hall D2.

== Schedule ==
All times are Western Indonesia Time (UTC+07:00)

Date	Time	Event
Monday, 20 August 2018	13:00	Qualification
Friday, 24 August 2018	16:00	Final

== Results ==
Legend

- DNS — Did not start

=== Qualification ===
Rank	Athlete	Vault 1	Vault 2	Total
1	Shek Wai Hung (HKG)	14.700	14.150	14.425
2	Lê Thanh Tùng (VIE)	14.650	14.050	14.350
3	Agus Adi Prayoko (INA)	14.600	14.100	14.350
4	Carlos Yulo (PHI)	13.950	14.350	14.150
5	Kim Han-sol (KOR)	14.200	13.900	14.050
6	Ri Se-gwang (PRK)	14.200	13.850	14.025
7	Jim Man Hin (HKG)	13.900	14.150	14.025
8	Nattipong Aeadwong (THA)	14.350	13.600	13.975
9	Shiao Yu-jan (TPE)	13.600	14.250	13.925
10	Yogeshwar Singh (IND)	14.150	13.550	13.850
11	Asad Aziz Jooma (PAK)	14.000	13.450	13.725
12	Ashish Kumar (IND)	14.100	12.950	13.525
13	Lee Chih-kai (TPE)	14.300	12.300	13.300
14	Saman Madani (IRI)	13.550	12.900	13.225
15	Muhammad Aprizal (INA)	13.100	13.350	13.225
16	Terry Tay (SGP)	13.400	12.950	13.175
17	Azroy Amierol Jaafar (MAS)	13.400	12.850	13.125
18	Siddharth Verma (IND)	13.100	12.850	12.975
19	Reyland Capellan (PHI)	13.100	12.550	12.825
20	Tikumporn Surintornta (THA)	12.950	12.650	12.800
21	Ahmed Nabil Mosa (QAT)	12.950	11.900	12.425
22	Jaffar Al-Sayigh (KSA)	12.000	12.850	12.425
23	Altansükhiin Enkhtulga (MGL)	13.100	11.350	12.225
—	Choeun Sokden (CAM)			DNS

=== Final ===
Rank	Athlete	Vault 1	Vault 2	Total
1st place, gold medalist(s)	Shek Wai Hung (HKG)	14.775	14.450	14.612
2nd place, silver medalist(s)	Kim Han-sol (KOR)	14.875	14.225	14.550
3rd place, bronze medalist(s)	Agus Adi Prayoko (INA)	14.225	14.025	14.125
4	Carlos Yulo (PHI)	14.350	12.975	13.662
5	Ri Se-gwang (PRK)	12.800	14.000	13.400
6	Lê Thanh Tùng (VIE)	14.000	12.375	13.187
7	Nattipong Aeadwong (THA)	12.625	13.675	13.150
8	Jim Man Hin (HKG)	13.000	0.000	6.500
