= Gymnastics at the 2015 SEA Games – Men's pommel horse =

Gymnastics – Men's pommel horse at the 2015 SEA Games
- Venue: Bishan Sports Hall
- Date: 9 June 2015
- Competitors: 8 from 5 nations

Medalists
gold medal	Rartchawat Kaewpanya	Thailand
silver medal	Gabriel Gan	Singapore
bronze medal	Lê Thanh Tùng	Vietnam

The men's pommel horse competition at the 2015 SEA Games was held on 9 June 2015 at the Bishan Sports Hall in Singapore.

== Schedule ==
All times are Singapore Standard Time (UTC+8).

Date	Time	Event
Tuesday, 9 June 2015	14:35	Final

== Qualification ==
Qualification took place on 6 June 2015 as part of the team and individual qualification event.

== Results ==
Source: Results - Men's pommel horse

Pos.	Gymnast	D Score	E Score	Penalty	Total
1st place, gold medalist(s)	Rartchawat Kaewpanya (THA)	6.100	8.566		14.666
2nd place, silver medalist(s)	Gabriel Gan (SIN)	5.700	8.833		14.533
3rd place, bronze medalist(s)	Lê Thanh Tùng (VIE)	5.200	8.033		13.233
4	Muhammad Try Saputra (INA)	5.400	7.433		12.833
5	Jamorn Prommanee (THA)	5.700	6.966		12.666
6	Gregory Gan (SIN)	5.200	7.100		12.300
7	Đinh Phương Thành (VIE)	5.300	6.833		12.133
8	Jeremiah Loo Phay Xing (MAS)	4.400	6.233		10.633
