= Gymnastics at the 2019 SEA Games – Men's horizontal bar =

Gymnastics – Men's horizontal bar at the 2019 SEA Games
- Venue: Rizal Memorial Coliseum
- Date: 1 – 4 December 2019
- Competitors: 9 from 6 nations

Medalists
gold medal	Đinh Phương Thành (VIE)
silver medal	Carlos Yulo (PHI)
bronze medal	Sean Yeo Xong (SIN)

The men's horizontal bar competition for gymnastics artistic at the 2019 SEA Games in Philippines was held from 1 to 4 December 2019 at Rizal Memorial Coliseum.

== Schedule ==
All times are Philippine Standard Time (UTC+8).

Date	Time	Round
Sunday, 1 December	14:00	Qualification
Wednesday, 4 December	18:30	Final

== Results ==
=== Final ===
Rank	Name	Difficulty	Execution	Penalty	Total
1st place, gold medalist(s)	Đinh Phương Thành (VIE)	5.200	8.567		13.767
2nd place, silver medalist(s)	Carlos Yulo (PHI)	5.100	8.567		13.667
3rd place, bronze medalist(s)	Sean Yeo Xong (SIN)	5.000	8.567		13.567
4	Lincoln Liqht Man (SIN)	4.800	8.367		13.167
5	Dwi Arifin (INA)	4.300	7.967		12.267
6	Lê Thanh Tùng (VIE)	4.900	7.633	-0.3	12.233
7	Anucha Pornsirijanya (THA)	4.600	6.333		10.933
8	Zul Bahrin Mat Asri (MAS)	3.700	6.333		10.033
9	Muhammad Saputra (INA)	3.500	6.367		9.867
