= Aldrin Castañeda =

Filipino gymnastics coach

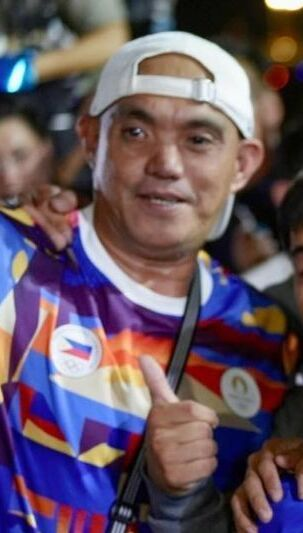
- Castañeda in 2024

Personal information
- Citizenship: Filipino
- Born: Allen Aldrin Castañeda; 1972 (age 53–54)
- Home town: Cebu City, Philippines
- Employer: Gymnastics Association of the Philippines

Sport
- Sport: Artistic gymnastics
- Position: Coach
- University team: University of Southern Philippines Foundation
- Now coaching: Carlos Yulo

Allen Aldrin Castañeda (born 1972) is a Filipino Olympic gymnastics coach who coached two-time Olympic gold medalist Carlos Yulo.

== Career ==
Castañeda who hails from Cebu City was a former gymnast himself who competed for the Philippines internationally. He would take part at the Asian Gymnastics Championships in the 1990s.

He was also the coach of the University of Southern Philippines Foundation gymnastics team.

Along with other Cebuanos Ricardo Otero and Joel Panugalinog, Castañeda taught Carlos Yulo during his junior years until 2016, when Japanese coach Munehiro Kugimiya took Yulo under his tutelage. When Kugimiya and Yulo parted ways in 2023, Castañeda became his coach again.

Castañeda would be the coach of Yulo when the gymnast clinch a historic double gold in the floor exercise and vault in the 2024 Summer Olympics in Paris. As per law, Castañeda is also entitled to receive incentives for Yulo's feat. Taking advantage of the feat, coach Darlene Dela Pisa would advocate for more support for gymnastics in their hometown.

In October 2024, it was decided that Castañeda will remain Yulo's coach.

== Personal life ==
Aldrin Castañeda is the second eldest of seven siblings to Cebu gymnastics officials Norberto and Regina Castañeda
