= Sharul Aimy =

Malaysian artistic gymnast

Muhammad Sharul Aimy
- Full name: Muhammad Sharul Aimy bin Kamaru Hisam
- Born: 3 September 2001 (age 25) Terengganu, Malaysia
- Height: 171 cm (5 ft 7 in)

Gymnastics career
- Discipline: Men's artistic gymnastics
- Country represented: Malaysia
- Head coach: Ng Shu Liang
Medal record
Men's gymnastics
Representing Malaysia
Asian Games
Bronze medal – third place	2022 Hangzhou	Vault
Asian Championships
Bronze medal – third place	2024 Tashkent	Vault
Southeast Asian Games
Bronze medal – third place	2021 Vietnam	Pommel horse
Bronze medal – third place	2023 Cambodia	Pommel horse
Bronze medal – third place	2023 Cambodia	Team

Muhammad Sharul Aimy bin Kamaru Hisam (born 3 September 2001) is a Malaysian artistic gymnast.

== Personal life ==
Yeoh was born in Terengganu in 2001. He is studying Bachelor of Communication in University of Putra Malaysia.

== Gymnastics career ==
=== 2022 ===
The 2021 Southeast Asian Games were postponed until 2022 due to the global COVID-19 pandemic. He won the bronze medal on the pommel horse event.

=== 2023 ===
The 2022 Asian Games were postponed until 2022 due to the COVID-19 pandemic. He won the bronze medal on the vault event, ended the country’s Asian Games medal drought in gymnastics after 17 years.

=== 2024 ===
In the Asian Championships held in Tashkent, Sharul won the bronze medal in vault event, which is also the Malaysia's first ever medal in artistic gymnastics from Asian Gymnastics Championships.

== Competitive history ==
Competitive history of Sharul Aimy
Year	Event	Team	AA	FX	PH	SR	VT	PB	HB
2022	Southeast Asian Games				3rd place, bronze medalist(s)				
2022	Commonwealth Games						7		
2023	Southeast Asian Games	3rd place, bronze medalist(s)	15		3rd place, bronze medalist(s)				
2023	Asian Games						3rd place, bronze medalist(s)		
2024
2024	Asian Championships						3rd place, bronze medalist(s)		
2026
2026	Commonwealth Games						4		
2026	Asian Games						8		
