= 2017 Asian Artistic Gymnastics Championships =

International gymnastics competition

- Host city: Bangkok, Thailand
- Dates: 18–21 May 2017
- Main venue: Nimibutr Stadium

The 2017 Asian Artistic Gymnastics Championships was the 7th edition of the Asian Artistic Gymnastics Championships, and were held in Bangkok, Thailand from 18 May to 21 May 2017.

== Medal summary ==
=== Men ===
Event	Gold	Silver	Bronze
Team	China; Lin Chaopan; Sun Wei; Liu Rongbing; Xiao Ruoteng; Zou Jingyuan	South Korea; Jo Yeong-gwang; Park Min-soo; Kim Han-sol; Lee Jung-hyo; Lee Jae-seong	Japan; Hayato Uchida; Jun Muraoka; Shuto Horiuchi; Tatsuki Ichise; Hiroki Ishikawa
Individual all-around	Xiao Ruoteng; China	Lin Chaopan; China	Park Min-soo; South Korea
Floor	Lin Chaopan; China	Xiao Ruoteng; China	Kim Han-sol; South Korea
Pommel horse	Xiao Ruoteng; China	Zou Jingyuan; China	Saeid Reza Keikha; Iran
Rings	Zou Jingyuan; China	Ng Kiu Chung; Hong Kong	Chen Chih-yu; Chinese Taipei
Vault	Lê Thanh Tùng; Vietnam	Kim Han-sol; South Korea	Shuto Horiuchi; Japan
Parallel bars	Zou Jingyuan; China	Han Jong-hyok; North Korea	Đinh Phương Thành; Vietnam
Horizontal bar	Lin Chaopan; China	Xiao Ruoteng; China	Milad Karimi; Kazakhstan

=== Women ===
Event	Gold	Silver	Bronze
Team	China; Liu Tingting; Luo Huan; Tan Jiaxin; Liu Jinru	North Korea; Jon Jang-mi; Pyon Rye-yong; Kim Won-yong; Kim Su-jong; Jong Un-gyong	Japan; Marina Kawasaki; Koko Dobashi; Nozomi Toyoda; Kasumi Murohashi; Honoka Koga
Individual all-around	Liu Tingting; China	Luo Huan; China	Kim Su-jong; North Korea
Vault	Liu Jinru; China	Kim Su-jong; North Korea	Pyon Rye-yong; North Korea
Uneven bars	Luo Huan; China	Liu Tingting; China	Jon Jang-mi; North Korea
Balance beam	Liu Tingting; China	Luo Huan; China	Lai Pin-ju; Chinese Taipei
Floor	Honoka Koga; Japan	Shared gold	Lee Eun-ju; South Korea
Floor	Kim Su-jong; North Korea	Shared gold	Lee Eun-ju; South Korea

== Medal table ==
Rank	Nation	Gold	Silver	Bronze	Total
1	China	12	7	0	19
2	North Korea	1	3	3	7
3	Japan	1	0	3	4
4	Vietnam	1	0	1	2
5	South Korea	0	2	3	5
6	Hong Kong	0	1	0	1
7	Chinese Taipei	0	0	2	2
8	Iran	0	0	1	1
8	Kazakhstan	0	0	1	1
Totals (9 entries)		15	13	14	42

== Participating nations ==
128 athletes from 20 nations competed.

- China (9)
- Chinese Taipei (9)
- Hong Kong (2)
- India (10)
- Indonesia (1)
- Iran (3)
- Japan (10)
- Jordan (3)
- Kazakhstan (8)
- Malaysia (10)
- North Korea (10)
- Philippines (8)
- Qatar (2)
- Singapore (3)
- South Korea (7)
- Sri Lanka (9)
- Thailand (9)
- Turkmenistan (2)
- Uzbekistan (3)
- Vietnam (10)
