= Gymnastics at the 2015 SEA Games – Men's horizontal bar =

Gymnastics – Men's horizontal bar at the 2015 SEA Games
- Venue: Bishan Sports Hall
- Date: 10 June 2015
- Competitors: 8 from 5 nations

Medalists
gold medal	Đinh Phương Thành	Vietnam
silver medal	Loo Phay Xing	Malaysia
bronze medal	Aizat Muhammad Jufrie	Singapore

The Men's horizontal bar competition at the 2015 SEA Games was held on 10 June 2015 at the Bishan Sports Hall in Singapore.

== Schedule ==
All times are Singapore Standard Time (UTC+8).

Date	Time	Event
Saturday, 6 June 2015	09:00	Qualification
Wednesday, 10 June 2015	15:20	Final

== Qualification ==
Qualification took place on 6 June 2015 as part of the team and individual qualification event.

== Results ==
Source: Results - Men's horizontal bar

Pos.	Gymnast	D Score	E Score	Penalty	Total
1st place, gold medalist(s)	Đinh Phương Thành (VIE)	5.700	8.533		14.233
2nd place, silver medalist(s)	Jeremiah Loo Phay Xing (MAS)	5.000	9.133		14.133
3rd place, bronze medalist(s)	Aizat Muhammad Jufrie (SIN)	4.400	8.433		12.833
4	Timothy Tay (SIN)	4.800	7.766		12.566
5	Muhammad Try Saputra (INA)	5.300	7.033		12.333
6	Hoàng Cường (VIE)	5.000	7.266		12.266
7	Ferrous One Willyodac (INA)	5.200	6.433		11.633
8	Tissanupan Wichianpradit (THA)	4.000	6.733		10.733
