= Gymnastics at the 2019 SEA Games – Men's artistic all-around =

Gymnastics – Men's artistic all around at the 2019 SEA Games
- Venue: Rizal Memorial Coliseum
- Date: 1 December 2019
- Competitors: 26 from 7 nations

Medalists
gold medal	Carlos Yulo (PHI)
silver medal	Đinh Phương Thành (VIE)
bronze medal	Lê Thanh Tùng (VIE)

The men's all-around competition for gymnastics artistic at the 2019 SEA Games in Philippines was held on 1 December 2019 at Rizal Memorial Coliseum.

The top eight scorers for each apparatus move on to the event finals.

Carlos Yulo bagged the gold in the men's all-around after placing first in the floor exercise and the horizontal bars and second on the still rings, vault, and parallel bars.

Vietnam's Đinh Phương Thành and Lê Thanh Tùng brought home the event's silver and bronze after placing second and third, respectively.

== Results ==
Rank	Gymnast	Floor (gymnastics)	Pommel horse	Rings (gymnastics)	Vault (gymnastics)	Parallel bars	Horizontal bar	Total
1st place, gold medalist(s)	(Philippines) Carlos Yulo	14.650	13.600	13.600	14.900	14.400	13.750	84.900
2nd place, silver medalist(s)	(Vietnam) Đinh Phương Thành	13.900	13.450	12.400	14.150	15.000	13.450	82.350
3rd place, bronze medalist(s)	(Vietnam) Lê Thanh Tùng	12.450	13.400	13.350	15.050	14.050	13.400	81.700
4	(Indonesia) Muhammad Saputra	12.950	12.700	11.600	13.300	13.300	11.650	75.500
5	(Thailand) Ratthasat Karn Boon	12.400	10.750	11.350	12.900	11.650	10.750	69.800
6	(Malaysia) Jeremiah Loo Phay Xing	13.150	13.700		14.100	13.550		54.500
7	(Thailand) Tikumporn Surintornta	13.800		12.900	13.750		11.550	52.000
8	(Malaysia) Zul Bahrin Mat Asri	12.750		11.500	12.700		12.200	49.150
9	(Philippines) Jan Gwynn Timbang		11.300	10.900		11.300	9.950	43.450
10	(Thailand) Jamorn Prommanee	13.000	13.250			14.250		40.500
11	(Malaysia) Tan Fu Jie	12.250	14.600		13.000			39.850
12	(Philippines) Justine Ace De Leon	12.000			13.225	11.100		36.325
13	(Indonesia) Trisna Ramdhany	11.900	10.650			10.650		33.200
14	(Cambodia) Vey Pheaktra	10.200	8.300		12.650			31.150
15	(Philippines) Reyland Capellan	13.550			14.300			27.850
16	(Indonesia) Muhammad Aprizal			11.950	13.325			25.275
17	(Singapore) Terry Tay Wei-an	11.800			13.375			25.175
18	(Indonesia) Dwi Arifin			12.850			11.750	24.600
19	(Vietnam) Van Vi Luong		9.450			13.900		23.350
20	(Singapore) Robin Sim Boon Pin	11.250	11.200					22.450
21	(Indonesia) Agus Prayoko				14.500			14.500
22	(Vietnam) Dang Nam			13.900				13.900
23	(Malaysia) Chau Jern Rong		13.250					13.250
24	(Singapore) Lincoln Liqht Man						13.100	13.100
25	(Singapore) Sean Yeo Xong Sean						13.100	13.100
26	(Thailand) Anucha Pornsirijanya						11.650	11.650
