= Gymnastics at the 2019 SEA Games – Men's parallel bars =

Gymnastics – Men's parallel bars at the 2019 SEA Games
- Venue: Rizal Memorial Coliseum
- Date: 1 – 4 December 2019
- Competitors: 8 from 5 nations

Medalists
gold medal	Đinh Phương Thành (VIE)
silver medal	Carlos Yulo (PHI)
bronze medal	Lê Thanh Tùng (VIE)

The men's parallel bars competition for gymnastics artistic at the 2019 SEA Games in Philippines was held from 1 to 4 December 2019 at Rizal Memorial Coliseum.

== Schedule ==
All times are Philippine Standard Time (UTC+8).

Date	Time	Round
Sunday, 1 December	14:00	Qualification
Wednesday, 4 December	17:30	Final

== Results ==
=== Final ===
Rank	Name	Difficulty	Execution	Penalty	Total
1st place, gold medalist(s)	Đinh Phương Thành (VIE)	6.400	8.400		14.800
2nd place, silver medalist(s)	Carlos Yulo (PHI)	5.900	8.700		14.600
3rd place, bronze medalist(s)	Lê Thanh Tùng (VIE)	5.900	8.333		14.233
4	Jeremiah Loo Phay Xing (MAS)	5.200	8.400		13.600
5	Jamorn Prommanee (THA)	5.600	7.833		13.433
6	Muhammad Saputra (INA)	5.100	7.433		12.533
7	Zul Bahrin Mat Asri (MAS)	4.100	7.733		11.833
8	Ratthasat Karn Boon (THA)	3.800	7.433		11.233
