= Louis Phạm =

Vietnamese artistic gymnast

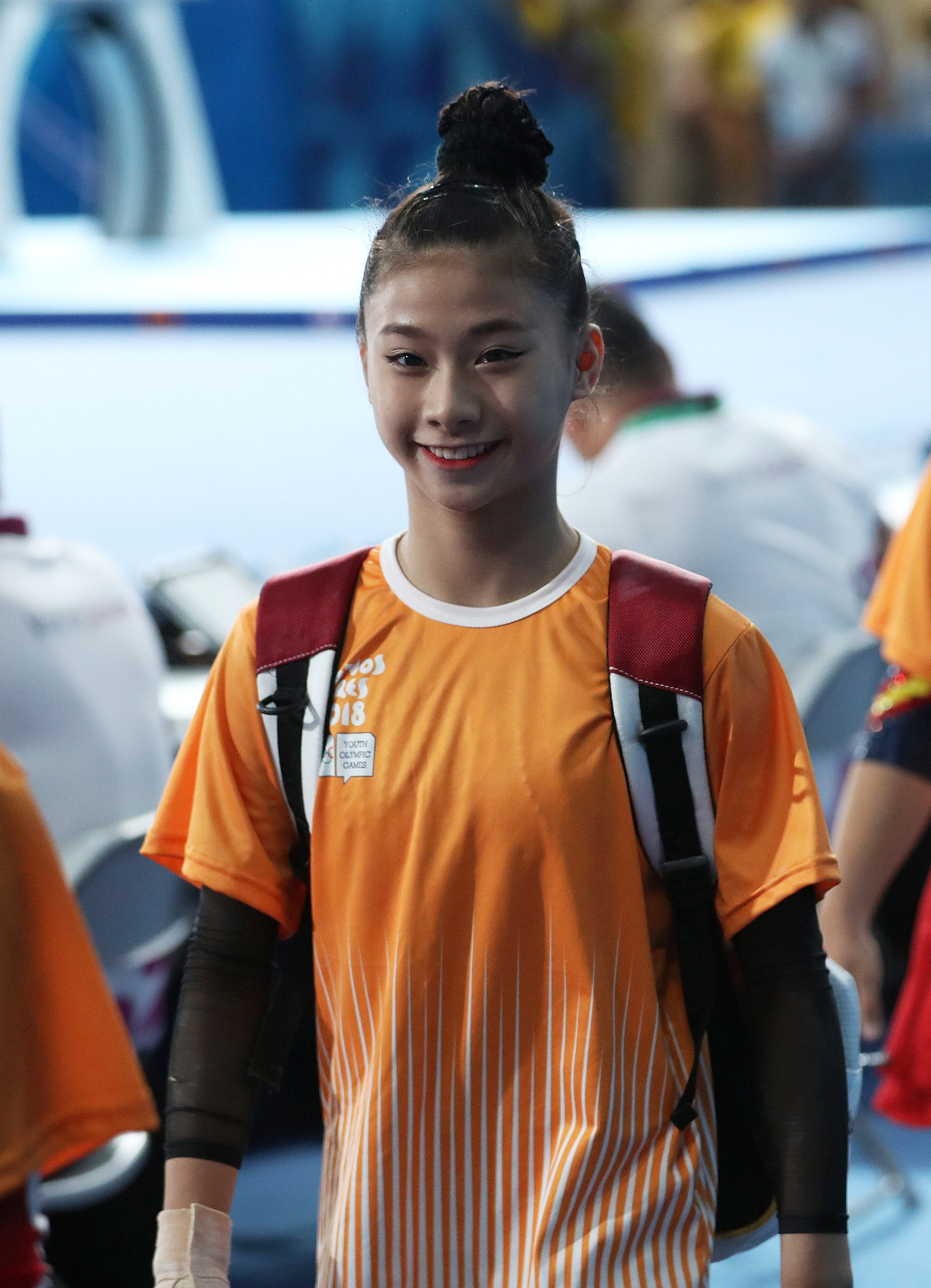
- Như Phương at the 2018 Youth Olympics

Personal information
- Full name: Phạm Như Phương
- Born: 25 November 2003 (age 22) Hanoi, Vietnam

Gymnastics career
- Discipline: Women's artistic gymnastics
- Country represented: Vietnam; (2017–2023 (VIE))
- Retired: January 2024
Medal record
Representing Vietnam
Southeast Asian Games
Silver medal – second place	2021 Vietnam	Team
Silver medal – second place	2021 Vietnam	Uneven Bars
Bronze medal – third place	2021 Vietnam	Balance Beam
Bronze medal – third place	2021 Vietnam	Floor Exercise
Representing (International Olympic Committee) Mixed-NOCs
Summer Youth Olympics
Gold medal – first place	2018 Buenos Aires	Mixed team

Phạm Như Phương (born November 25, 2003), known as Louis Phạm, is a Vietnamese artistic gymnast. She represented Vietnam at the 2018 Youth Olympics where she was part of the gold medal winning mixed multi-discipline team.

== Early life ==
Phương was born in Hanoi in 2003.

== Gymnastics career ==
Phương competed at the 2017 Olympic Hopes Cup where she placed 34th in the all-around.

At the 2018 Junior Asian Championships, Phương finished ninth in the all-around. She was selected to represent Vietnam at the 2018 Summer Youth Olympics. While there she was named to the mixed multi-discipline team named after American gymnast Simone Biles; the team placed first.

Phương competed at the postponed Southeast Asian Games. She helped Vietnam place second as a team and individually she won silver on uneven bars and bronze on balance beam and floor exercise.

== Competitive history ==
Year	Event	Team	AA	VT	UB	BB	FX
Junior
2017	Olympic Hopes Cup		34				
2018
2018	Asian Championships		9				
2018	Youth Olympic Games	(gold) (Note: The teams were randomly assigned with gymnasts from different countries and disciplines)	R4				
Senior
2019	Korea Cup					7	9
2022	Southeast Asian Games	2nd place, silver medalist(s)	5		2nd place, silver medalist(s)	3rd place, bronze medalist(s)	3rd place, bronze medalist(s)
2023
2023	Asian Championships	7	19				
