= Gymnastics at the 2019 SEA Games – Men's vault =

Gymnastics – Men's vault at the 2019 SEA Games
- Venue: Rizal Memorial Coliseum
- Date: 1 – 4 December 2019
- Competitors: 15 from 7 nations

Medalists
gold medal	Agus Adi Prayoko (INA)
silver medal	Carlos Yulo (PHI)
bronze medal	Lê Thanh Tùng (VIE)

The men's vault competition for gymnastics artistic at the 2019 SEA Games in Philippines was held from 1 to 4 December 2019 at Rizal Memorial Coliseum.

== Schedule ==
All times are Philippine Standard Time (UTC+8).

Date	Time	Round
Sunday, 1 December	14:00	Qualification
Wednesday, 4 December	16:00	Final

== Results ==
=== Final ===
Rank	Name	Vault 1				Vault 2				Total average
Rank	Name	Difficulty	Execution	Penalty	Total	Difficulty	Execution	Penalty	Total	Total average
1st place, gold medalist(s)	Agus Adi Prayoko (INA)	5.600	9.367		14.967	5.200	9.300		14.500	14.734
2nd place, silver medalist(s)	Carlos Yulo (PHI)	5.600	9.133	-0.1	14.633	5.600	9.167		14.767	14.700
3rd place, bronze medalist(s)	Lê Thanh Tùng (VIE)	5.600	9.267		14.867	5.200	9.167		14.367	14.617
4	Muhammad Aprizal (INA)	5.600	8.833	-0.1	14.333	5.600	7.800		12.400	13.867
5	Reyland Capellan (PHI)	5.600	7.900		13.500	5.200	9.033	-0.1	14.133	13.817
6	Tikumporn Surintornta (THA)	5.200	8.633	-0.1	13.733	5.200	8.567		13.767	13.750
7	Terry Tay Wei-An (SGP)	5.200	8.567	-0.1	13.667	4.800	8.600	-0.1	13.300	13.484
8	Ratthasat Karn Boon (THA)	5.200	8.233		13.433	4.800	8.533		13.333	13.383
