= Gymnastics at the 2017 SEA Games – Men's artistic team all-around =

Gymnastics – Men's artistic team at the 2017 SEA Games
- Venue: Malaysia International Trade and Exhibition Centre (MITEC)
- Date: 21 August 2017
- Competitors: 37 from 8 nations

Medalists
gold medal	Đặng Nam; Đinh Phương Thành; Đỗ Vũ Hưng; Lê Thanh Tùng; Phạm Phước Hưng; Trần Đình Vương	Vietnam
silver medal	Azroy Amierol Jaafar; Chau Jern Rong; Loo Phay Xing; Muhd Abdul Azim Othman; Tan Fu Jie; Zul Bahrin Mat Asri	Malaysia
bronze medal	Jamorn Prommanee; Natthawat Lamaiwan; Natthawut Lamaiwan; Nattipong Aeadwong; Tikumporn Surintornta; Tissanupan Wichianpradit	Thailand

The men's artistic team competition at the 2017 SEA Games was held on 20 August 2017 at the Hall 10, Level 3, Malaysia International Trade and Exhibition Centre (MITEC) in Kuala Lumpur, Malaysia.

The team competition also served as qualification for the event finals.

== Schedule ==
All times are Malaysia Standard Time (UTC+8).

Date	Time	Event
Sunday, 20 August 2017	10:00	Final

== Results ==
Source: Results - Men's artistic team

Rank	Team	Floor (gymnastics)	Pommel horse	Rings (gymnastics)	Vault (gymnastics)	Parallel bars	Horizontal bar	Total
1st place, gold medalist(s)	Vietnam (VIE)	51.350	48.150	54.150	55.550	58.200	51.650	319.050
	Lê Thanh Tùng	13.200	~~11.050~~	13.050	14.600	14.450	13.100	79.450
	Trần Đình Vương	13.000	11.650	12.700	~~12.850~~	14.000	12.950	77.150
	Đỗ Vũ Hưng	~~11.250~~	11.200	~~12.100~~	14.000	~~12.100~~	~~11.750~~	72.400
	Đinh Phương Thành	13.100	12.450		13.700	15.150	12.900	
	Phạm Phước Hưng	12.050	12.850	13.800		14.600	12.700	
	Đặng Nam			14.600	13.250			
2nd place, silver medalist(s)	Malaysia (MAS)	50.450	52.600	47.350	52.600	51.600	50.950	305.550
	Jeremiah Loo Phay Xing	12.950	13.350	11.100	13.000	13.450	13.200	77.050
	Azroy Amierol Bin Jaafar	12.100	12.600	11.500	13.700	~~12.500~~	12.500	74.900
	Zul Bahrin Bin Mat Asri	13.300		11.900	12.450	13.050	12.050	
	Muhammad Abdul Azim Bin Othman	~~12.000~~	~~12.250~~		13.450	12.550	~~11.350~~	
	Chau Jern Rong		12.750	12.850		12.550	13.200	
	Tan Fu Jie	12.100	13.900		~~0.000~~			
3rd place, bronze medalist(s)	Thailand (THA)	49.200	45.200	49.300	52.750	47.450	49.300	293.200
	Nattipong Aeadwong	12.000	11.300	12.550	13.100	13.050	12.000	74.000
	Natthawat Lamaiwan	~~9.550~~	10.450	~~10.700~~	12.800	10.750	~~10.800~~	65.050
	Tikumporn Surintornta	12.450		13.300	13.900		12.850	
	Jamorn Prommanee	12.800	13.400		12.950	13.350		
	Tissanupan Wichianpradit	11.950		11.950	~~12.550~~		12.850	
	Natthawut Lamaiwan		10.050	11.500		10.300	11.600	
4	Indonesia (INA)	47.100	46.750	46.650	54.200	45.700	44.200	284.600
	Muhammad Aprizal	11.800	11.250	11.800	13.750		11.050	
	Muhammad Try Saputra	~~10.650~~	11.650		13.250	13.450	~~10.300~~	
	Dwi Samsul Arifin	12.750		12.050	12.800	10.550	10.650	
	Audi Ashari Arif	10.950	12.800	11.100		11.450	10.900	
	Agus Adi Prayoko		11.050	11.700	14.400	~~10.150~~		
	Ferrous One Willyodac	11.600		~~0.000~~	~~11.950~~	10.250	11.600	
5	Philippines (PHI)	50.100	41.600	41.550	52.600	47.250	45.150	278.250
	Reyland Yuson Cappelan	13.650	9.850	10.050	13.550	11.600	11.300	70.000
	Jan Gwynn Decena Timbang	~~11.000~~	10.700	11.250	13.550	11.850	11.400	69.750
	Fortunato Abad IV	12.450	~~8.800~~	10.900	12.600	12.150	10.400	67.300
	John Matthew Villar Vergara	12.400	10.050	9.350	~~11.300~~	11.650	~~9.750~~	64.500
	Albert Tristan Lopez	11.600	11.000	~~6.900~~	12.900		12.050	
6	Singapore (SIN)	47.100	39.700	43.800	49.250	47.800	31.150	258.800
	Martyn Danial Hazwan Bin Armada	10.750	10.400	10.450	12.600	11.500	11.550	67.250
	Ryan Lee Shi Hern	11.800	10.700	12.150	10.600	11.800	10.000	67.050
	Timothy Tay Kai Cheng	11.750	6.200	11.050	13.150	12.850	9.600	64.600
	Yeo Xong Sean	12.800	12.400	10.150	12.900	11.650		
Individuals
	Myo Zaw Oo (MYA)	10.500		9.950	11.850	9.600		
	Sam Rim (CAM)	11.900			12.400			
	Aung Khant Zaw (MYA)	12.050			10.950			
	Thi Ha (MYA)		7.550			10.200		
