= Gymnastics at the 2010 Asian Games – Men's rings =

Men's rings at the 2010 Asian Games
- Venue: Asian Games Town Gymnasium
- Date: 13–16 November 2010
- Competitors: 60 from 16 nations

Medalists
gold medal	Chen Yibing	China
silver medal	Yan Mingyong	China
bronze medal	Chen Chih-yu	Chinese Taipei

The men's rings competition at the 2010 Asian Games in Guangzhou, China was held on 13 and 16 November 2010 at the Asian Games Town Gymnasium.

== Schedule ==
All times are China Standard Time (UTC+08:00)

Date	Time	Event
Saturday, 13 November 2010	09:30	Qualification
Tuesday, 16 November 2010	21:00	Final

== Results ==
=== Qualification ===
Rank	Athlete	Score
1	Chen Yibing (CHN)	16.200
2	Yan Mingyong (CHN)	15.950
3	Chen Chih-yu (TPE)	15.750
4	Yoo Won-chul (KOR)	15.500
5	Lü Bo (CHN)	15.400
6	Hisashi Mizutori (JPN)	15.350
7	Hadi Khanarinejad (IRI)	15.350
8	Timur Kurbanbayev (KAZ)	15.250
9	Takuya Nakase (JPN)	15.050
10	Kyoichi Watanabe (JPN)	14.950
11	Sin Seob (KOR)	14.750
12	Ildar Valeyev (KAZ)	14.750
13	Teng Haibin (CHN)	14.750
14	Anton Fokin (UZB)	14.700
15	Shun Kuwahara (JPN)	14.650
16	Phạm Phước Hưng (VIE)	14.650
17	Suriyen Chanduang (THA)	14.600
18	Ryosuke Baba (JPN)	14.500
19	Amir Azami (IRI)	14.300
20	Kim Hee-hoon (KOR)	14.200
21	Stanislav Valiyev (KAZ)	14.100
22	Yang Hak-seon (KOR)	14.050
23	Stepan Gorbachev (KAZ)	14.000
24	Huang Hsien (TPE)	13.900
25	Mahmood Al-Sadi (QAT)	13.800
26	Hsu Ping-chien (TPE)	13.700
27	Ehsan Khodadadi (IRI)	13.650
28	Rakesh Kumar Patra (IND)	13.500
29	Ng Kiu Chung (HKG)	13.500
30	Yernar Yerimbetov (KAZ)	13.450
31	Kim Soo-myun (KOR)	13.450
32	Vahid Izadfar (IRI)	13.400
33	Lum Wan Foong (MAS)	13.400
34	Rartchawat Kaewpanya (THA)	13.400
35	Otabek Masharipov (UZB)	13.350
36	Kittipong Yudee (THA)	13.300
37	Ashish Kumar (IND)	13.300
38	Lu Yan-ting (TPE)	13.250
39	Trương Minh Sang (VIE)	13.250
40	Mohammad Ramezanpour (IRI)	13.200
41	Đặng Nam (VIE)	13.200
42	Shek Wai Hung (HKG)	13.050
43	Thitipong Sukdee (THA)	13.050
44	Ravshanbek Osimov (UZB)	13.000
45	Ganbatyn Erdenebold (MGL)	13.000
46	Tu Yu-chen (TPE)	12.800
47	Daulet Narmetov (UZB)	12.800
48	Weena Chokpaoumpai (THA)	12.750
49	Mayank Srivastava (SRI)	12.650
50	Alok Ranjan (IND)	12.600
51	Shinoj Muliyil (IND)	12.300
52	Hầu Trung Linh (VIE)	12.300
53	Ivan Olushev (UZB)	12.250
54	Ahmed Al-Dyani (QAT)	12.000
55	Nadika Cooray (SRI)	10.800
56	Abdulaziz Al-Johani (KSA)	10.600
57	Tharindu Pathmaperuma (SRI)	10.350
58	Jasem Gazwi (KSA)	9.850
59	Ali Al-Khwaher (KSA)	9.700
60	Habib Al-Swailah (KSA)	9.250

=== Final ===
Rank	Athlete	Score
1st place, gold medalist(s)	Chen Yibing (CHN)	16.075
2nd place, silver medalist(s)	Yan Mingyong (CHN)	15.900
3rd place, bronze medalist(s)	Chen Chih-yu (TPE)	15.625
4	Yoo Won-chul (KOR)	15.300
5	Hisashi Mizutori (JPN)	15.100
6	Timur Kurbanbayev (KAZ)	14.900
7	Takuya Nakase (JPN)	14.225
8	Hadi Khanarinejad (IRI)	12.700
