= Miguel Besana =

Filipino artistic gymnast

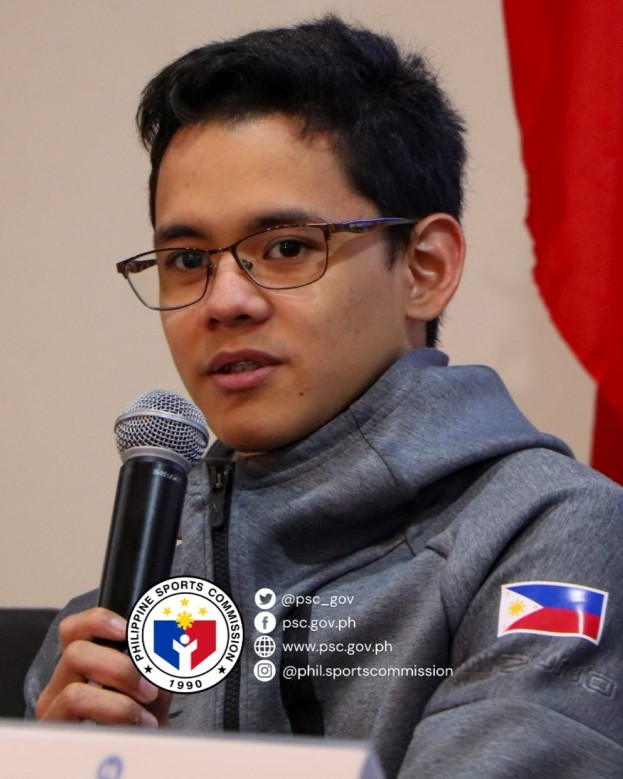
- Besana in 2023

Personal information
- Full name: Juancho Miguel Eserio Besana
- Born: August 18, 2003 (age 23) Pasig, Philippines

Gymnastics career
- Discipline: Men's artistic gymnastics
- Country represented: Philippines; (2022–present)
Medal record
Men's artistic gymnastics
Representing the Philippines
Pacific Rim Championships
Bronze medal – third place	2024 Cali	Vault
SEA Games
Gold medal – first place	2023 Cambodia	Vault
Silver medal – second place	2021 Vietnam	Team
Silver medal – second place	2023 Cambodia	Team
Bronze medal – third place	2021 Vietnam	Vault

Juancho Miguel Eserio Besana (born August 18, 2003) is a Filipino artistic gymnast. He is the 2023 SEA Games champion on vault as well as the 2024 Pacific Rim vault bronze medalist.

== Early life ==
Besana was born in Pasig in 2003 to mother Maru Eserio and father Junn Besana. He has been friends with fellow Filipino gymnasts Carlos Yulo and John Ivan Cruz since childhood.

== Gymnastics career ==
=== 2022 ===
Besana competed at the postponed 2021 Southeast Asian Games where he helped the Philippines win silver as a team. Individually he won bronze on vault behind compatriot Carlos Yulo and Tikumporn Surintornta of Thailand. At the 2022 Asian Championships Besana finished twenty-third in the all-around and helped the Philippines finish ninth as a team.

=== 2023 ===
In early 2023, Besana competed at the Cottbus World Cup where he finished eighth on vault. At the 2023 Southeast Asian Games Besana once again helped the Philippines win silver. Individually, he won gold on vault. In June Besana competed at the 2023 Asian Championships where he helped the Philippines finish seventh as a team and individually he finished twenty-third in the all-around and qualified to the vault final. During the vault final, he finished eighth.

Although Besana had qualified as an individual to compete at the 2023 World Championships, he opted instead to compete at the postponed 2022 Asian Games. While there, he only competed on vault where he finished tenth during qualifications and was the second reserve for the final.

=== 2024 ===
Besana competed at the Doha World Cup but finished nineteenth on vault during qualifications and did not advance to the final. In April, he competed at the 2024 Pacific Rim Championships. While there, he helped the Philippines finish sixth as a team and individually he finished eighth in the all-around and qualified for the floor exercise, pommel horse, vault, and horizontal bar event finals. During event finals, he won bronze on vault.

== Competitive history ==
Year	Event	Team	AA	FX	PH	SR	VT	PB	HB
2022	Southeast Asian Games	2nd place, silver medalist(s)	9				3rd place, bronze medalist(s)	5	4
2022	Asian Championships	9	23						
2023	Cottbus World Cup						8		
2023	Southeast Asian Games	2nd place, silver medalist(s)	6				1st place, gold medalist(s)		4
2023	Asian Championships	7	23				8		
2023	Asian Games						R2		
2024
2024	Asian Championships	6	14				4		
2024	Pacific Rim Championships	6	8	7	8		3rd place, bronze medalist(s)		8
2025
2025	Asian Championships	7							
2025	World University Games	23							
2025	World Championships		50						
2026
2026	Asian Championships	7							
2026	Asian Games	6					5		
