= Munehiro Kugimiya =

Japanese gymnastics coach

Personal information
- Native name: 釘宮 宗大
- Citizenship: Japanese
- Born: 1985 (age 40–41)
- Employer: Gymnastics Association of the Philippines

Sport
- Sport: Artistic gymnastics
- Position: Coach

Munehiro Kugimiya (釘宮 宗大, Kugimiya Munehiro; born 1985) is a Japanese gymnastics coach who was the longtime mentor of Filipino Olympic gold medalist Carlos Yulo.

== Career ==
=== Coaching Carlos Yulo ===
Kugimiya in 2013 would go to the Philippines to help train Filipino gymnasts which includes Carlos Yulo. Kugimiya would encourage Gymnastics Association of the Philippines (GAP) president Cynthia Carrion to allow Yulo to join the 2015 International Junior Gymnastics Competition in Japan where Yulo would place third despite Carrion's reservations about Yulo's readiness to compete internationally.

In 2016, Kugimiya became Yulo's dedicated coach with the gymnast moving to Japan, which the Japanese coach believes would provide a better climate condition than training in the Philippines.

In 2017, Kugimiya would advise Yulo to talk to his family when the gymnast expressed willingness to quit due to homesickness and lack of motivation. Yulo eventually decided to continue.

After the 2023 Asian Championships, Yulo parted ways with long-time coach Kugimiya due to personal reasons. The separation was cordial with Yulo expressing gratitude to the Japanese coach a year later.

Under Kugimiya's coaching, Yulo would clinch four golds in the FIG World Cup series, six golds in the Asian Championships, nine golds in the SEA Games as well as two titles in the World Championships

=== 2023 onwards ===
He would be still be involved with GAP, remaining a coach in the Philippine national gymnastics team. He would start a sports clinic at the Rizal Memorial Sports Complex with Filipino coaches as part of a cultural exchange program by the Japanese embassy in Manila started in September 2023. He negotiated the transfer of equipment used at the 2020 Summer Olympics in Tokyo to Manila.

Kugimiya would be part of a gymnastics delegation at the 2024 Summer Olympics in Paris. While having no chance to meet with Yulo in person, the coach would congratulate his former pupil for bagging two gold medals in the floor and vault. During this time, Kugimiya is co-currently holding the role as an associate professor in medical technology at the Teikyo University in Tokyo.
