= Gymnastics at the 2021 SEA Games =

- Venue: Quần Ngựa Sports Palace
- Location: Hanoi, Vietnam
- Date: 13–22 May 2022

The gymnastics competitions at the 2021 SEA Games took place at Quần Ngựa Sports Palace in Hanoi, Vietnam from 13 to 22 May 2022.

== Schedule ==
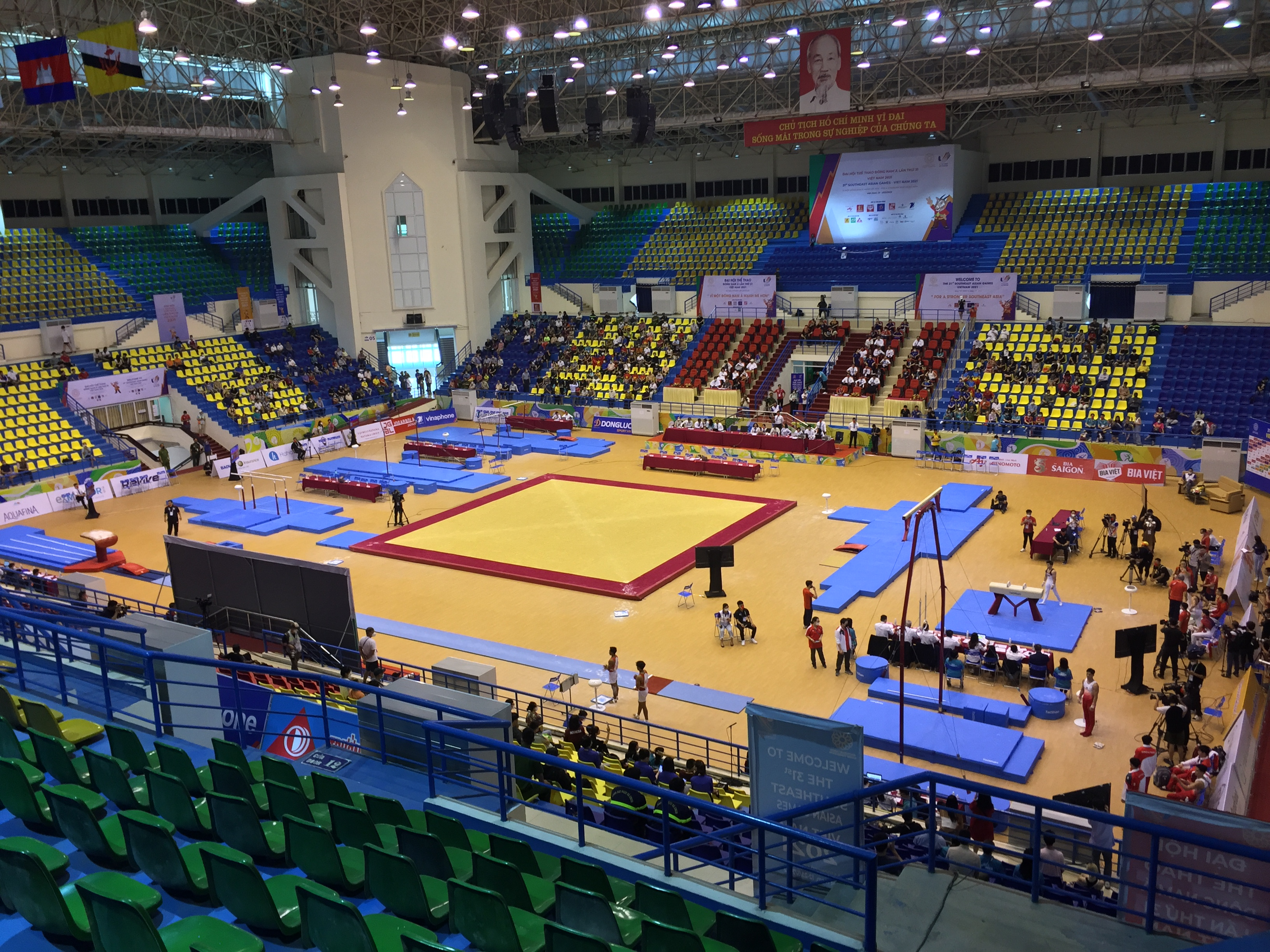
Quần Ngựa Sports Palace during men's team and all-around finals

The following is the schedule for the gymnastics competitions. All times in UTC+07:00.

Artistic

Friday, 13 May

- 10:00-18:30 – Men's team and all-around finals

Saturday, 14 May

- 10:00-18:30 – Women's team and all-around finals

Sunday, 15 May

- 14:00-17:00 – Men's floor exercise, pommel horse, and still rings and women's vault and uneven bars apparatus finals

Monday, 16 May

- 14:00-17:00 – Men's vault, parallel bars, and high bar and women's balance beam and floor exercise apparatus finals

== Medal summary ==
* Host nation (Vietnam)

| Rank | Nation | Gold | Silver | Bronze | Total |
|---|---|---|---|---|---|
| 1 | Vietnam* | 7 | 7 | 8 | 22 |
| 2 | Philippines | 7 | 4 | 3 | 14 |
| 3 | Malaysia | 4 | 2 | 2 | 8 |
| 4 | Thailand | 3 | 2 | 3 | 8 |
| 5 | Indonesia | 2 | 0 | 1 | 3 |
| 6 | Cambodia | 0 | 3 | 1 | 4 |
| 7 | Singapore | 0 | 1 | 3 | 4 |
| Totals (7 entries) | | 23 | 19 | 21 | 63 |

== Medalists ==
=== Aerobic ===
| Event | Gold | Silver | Bronze |
|---|---|---|---|
| Men's individual | Chanokpon Jiumsukjai; Thailand | Phan Thế Gia Hiển; Vietnam | Choeun Chanbory; Cambodia |
| Women's individual | Chawisa Intakul; Thailand | Trần Hà Vi; Vietnam | Charmaine Dolar; Philippines |
| Mixed pair | Vietnam; Lê Hoàng Phong; Trần Ngọc Thúy Vi | Cambodia; Has Sokhor; Mo Sreypov | Thailand; Chawisa Intakul; Phatcharapong Photjanakosri |
| Mixed trio | Vietnam; Nguyễn Chế Thanh; Lê Hoàng Phong; Trần Ngọc Thúy Vi | Cambodia; Has Sokhor; Mo Sreypov; Trorn Bunthoeun | Thailand; Yupawan Poosanapong; Irada Pantao; Supatsorn Watcharaporn |
| Mixed group | Vietnam; Nguyễn Chế Thanh; Lê Hoàng Phong; Trần Ngọc Thúy Vi; Vương Hoài An; Nguyễn Việt Anh | Cambodia; Mo Sreypov; Nget Tola; Choeun Chanbory; Has Sokhor; Trorn Bunthoeun | Thailand; Supatsorn Watcharaporn; Chawisa Intakul; Phatcharapong Photjanakosri; Nattawut Pimpa; Chanokpon Jiumsukjai |

=== Artistic ===
==== Men ====
| Event | Gold | Silver | Bronze |
|---|---|---|---|
| Team all-around | Vietnam; Đặng Ngọc Xuân Thiện; Văn Vĩ Lương; Trịnh Hải Khang; Nguyễn Văn Khánh Phong; Đinh Phương Thành; Lê Thanh Tùng | Philippines; John Ivan Cruz; Juancho Miguel Besana; Justine Ace De Leon; Jan Gwynn Timbang; John Matthew Vergara; Carlos Edriel Yulo | Singapore; Terry Wei-An Tay; Kaeson Lim Jun Yu; Zac Liew Jun Yi; Robin Sim Boon Pin; Jer Rong Chong; Mikhail Haziq Ghazali |
| Individual all-around | Carlos Yulo; Philippines | Lê Thanh Tùng; Vietnam | Đinh Phương Thành; Vietnam |
| Floor | Carlos Yulo; Philippines | Terry Wei-An Tay; Singapore | Trịnh Hải Khang; Vietnam |
| Pommel horse | Đặng Ngọc Xuân Thiện; Vietnam | Tan Fu Jie; Malaysia | Muhammad Sharul Aimy; Malaysia |
| Rings | Carlos Yulo; Philippines | Nguyễn Văn Khánh Phong; Vietnam | Lê Thanh Tùng; Vietnam |
| Vault | Carlos Yulo; Philippines | Tikumporn Surintornta; Thailand | Juancho Miguel Besana; Philippines |
| Parallel bars | Đinh Phương Thành; Vietnam | Carlos Yulo; Philippines | Lê Thanh Tùng; Vietnam |
| Horizontal bar | Carlos Yulo; Philippines | Not awarded | Lê Thanh Tùng; Vietnam |
| Horizontal bar | Đinh Phương Thành; Vietnam | Not awarded | Lê Thanh Tùng; Vietnam |

==== Women ====
| Event | Gold | Silver | Bronze |
|---|---|---|---|
| Team all-around | Philippines; Chiara Andrews; Aleah Finnegan; Lucia Gutierrez; Ma. Cristina Loberanes; Kursten Lopez; Ancilla Manzano | Vietnam; Đỗ Thị Ngọc Hương; Trương Khánh Vân; Phạm Như Phương; Nguyễn Thị Quỳnh Như; Lâm Như Quỳnh; Trần Đoàn Quỳnh Nam | Singapore; Shandy Poh Xi Zuan; Nadine Joy Nathan; Emma Yap; Kaitlyn Lim; Aryanna Nish Shetty; Yuet Yung Cheong |
| Individual all-around | Rifda Irfanaluthfi; Indonesia | Aleah Finnegan; Philippines | Rachel Yeoh Li Wen; Malaysia |
| Vault | Aleah Finnegan; Philippines | Nguyễn Thị Quỳnh Như; Vietnam | Rifda Irfanaluthfi; Indonesia |
| Uneven bars | Rachel Yeoh Li Wen; Malaysia | Phạm Như Phương; Vietnam | Nadine Joy Nathan; Singapore |
| Balance beam | Rachel Yeoh Li Wen; Malaysia | Aleah Finnegan; Philippines | Phạm Như Phương; Vietnam |
| Floor | Rifda Irfanaluthfi; Indonesia | Not awarded | Phạm Như Phương; Vietnam |
| Floor | Sasiwimon Mueangphuan; Thailand | Not awarded | Phạm Như Phương; Vietnam |

=== Rhythmic ===
| Event | Gold | Silver | Bronze |
|---|---|---|---|
| Team all-around | Malaysia; Yi Tung Yap; Yuki Shak; Jingle Shak Qi; Maia Xiao Han Ong; Ashley Xin Yi Lim | Thailand; Chonthichakon Changomon; Supidchaya Pinfun; Thanyaphat Thanawatatthaya; Pornnutcha Jedthumrong; Puntita Thongsong | Vietnam; Nguyễn Trúc Phương; Võ Ngọc Nhi; Phạm Nguyễn Vân Nhi; Trịnh Hương Giang; Ngô Hải Yến |
| Individual all-around | Koi Sie Yan; Malaysia | Joe Ee Ng; Malaysia | Breanna Labadan; Philippines |
