= Gymnastics at the 2023 SEA Games =

- Venue: Olympic Marquee Tent, Olympic Sport Complex
- Location: Phnom Penh, Cambodia
- Date: 8–14 May

The gymnastics competitions at the 2023 SEA Games took place in Phnom Penh, Cambodia from 8 to 14 May 2023.

Women's events were not held for artistic gymnastics while both men's and women's events were held for aerobic gymnastics.

Except the hosts, individual artistic gymnasts could only contend for the medal in two individual apparatuses, in addition to the team and individual all-around events.

== Schedule ==
The following is the schedule for the gymnastics competitions.

Artistic

8–9 May

Aerobic

13–14 May

== Medal summary ==
* Host nation (Cambodia)

Rank	Nation	Gold	Silver	Bronze	Total
1	Vietnam	9	2	2	13
2	Philippines	4	2	2	8
3	Thailand	0	6	0	6
4	Cambodia*	0	1	3	4
5	Indonesia	0	1	1	2
6	Singapore	0	1	0	1
7	Malaysia	0	0	5	5
Totals (7 entries)		13	13	13	39

== Medalists ==
=== Aerobic ===
Event	Gold	Silver	Bronze
Men's individual	Phan Thế Gia Hiển; Vietnam	Chanokpon Jiumsukjai; Thailand	Has Sokhor; Cambodia
Women's individual	Trần Hà Vi; Vietnam	Chawisa Intakul; Thailand	Charmaine Estaras Dolar; Philippines
Mixed pair	Vietnam; Lê Hoàng Phong; Trần Ngọc Thúy Vi	Cambodia; Has Sokho; Sreypov Mo	Philippines; Carl Joshua Tangonan; Charmaine Estaras Dolar
Mixed trio	Vietnam; Hoàng Gia Bảo; Lê Hoàng Phong; Nguyễn Chế Thanh	Thailand; Worranittha Meesuparoon; Supatsorn Watcharaporn; Panyaroj Watthong	Cambodia; Choeun Chanbory; Nget Tola; Trorn Bunthoeun
Mixed group	Vietnam; Vương Hoài An; Lê Hoàng Phong; Nguyễn Chế Thanh; Trần Ngọc Thuý Vi; Nguyễn Việt Anh	Thailand; Chanokpon Jiumsukjai; Supatsorn Watcharaporn; Panyaroj Watthong; Nattawut PimPa; Chawisa Intakul	Cambodia; Chhuon Sovanpanha; Dim Ornthida; Mo Sreypov; Nem Sokheng; Siv Chantha

=== Artistic ===
Event	Gold	Silver	Bronze
Team all-around	Vietnam; Lê Thanh Tùng; Đinh Phương Thành; Đặng Ngọc Xuân Thiện; Văn Vĩ Lương; Nguyễn Văn Khánh Phong; Trịnh Hải Khang	Philippines; Carlos Yulo; John Ivan Cruz; Jan Timbang; Justine Ace de Leon; Juancho Miguel Besana; Jhon Romeo Santillan	Malaysia; Muhammad Sharul Aimy; Luqman Al-Hafiz Zulfa; Ng Chun Chen; Muhammad Syakir Aiman Subri; Ally Hamuda Abdullah
Individual all-around	Carlos Yulo; Philippines	Lê Thanh Tùng; Vietnam	Đinh Phương Thành; Vietnam
Floor	John Ivan Cruz; Philippines	Tikumporn Surintornta; Thailand	Joseph Judah Hatoguan; Indonesia
Pommel horse	Đặng Ngọc Xuân Thiện; Vietnam	Kaeson Lim Jun Yi; Singapore	Muhammad Sharul Aimy; Malaysia
Rings	Nguyễn Văn Khánh Phong; Vietnam	Carlos Yulo; Philippines	Ally Hamuda Abdullah; Malaysia
Vault	Juancho Miguel Besana; Philippines	Tikumporn Surintornta; Thailand	Trịnh Hải Khang; Vietnam
Parallel bars	Carlos Yulo; Philippines	Đinh Phương Thành; Vietnam	Ng Chun Chen; Malaysia
Horizontal bar	Đinh Phương Thành; Vietnam	Abiyurafi; Indonesia	Luqman Al-Hafiz Zulfa; Malaysia

== Results ==
=== Men's artistic all-around ===
Rank	Gymnast	Floor (gymnastics)	Pommel horse	Rings (gymnastics)	Vault (gymnastics)	Parallel bars	Horizontal bar	Total
1st place, gold medalist(s)	(Philippines) Carlos Yulo	14.350	12.650	14.150	15.000	14.950	12.900	84.000
2nd place, silver medalist(s)	(Vietnam) Lê Thanh Tùng	13.500	12.700	13.200	11.550	13.900	13.400	78.250
3rd place, bronze medalist(s)	(Vietnam) Đinh Phương Thành	12.400	13.250	11.200	13.250	14.530	13.500	78.130
4	(Malaysia) Luqman Al Hafiz	13.100	11.500	12.300	13.850	12.500	12.400	75.650
5	(Malaysia) Chun Chen Ng	11.450	12.500	11.950	13.150	13.200	11.750	74.000
6	(Philippines) Juancho Miguel Besana	13.500	11.100	10.850	14.150	12.200	11.900	73.700
7	(Singapore) Zac Liew	13.100	11.050	11.700	13.250	12.300	11.450	72.850
8	(Vietnam) Văn Vĩ Lương	12.300	10.400	12.950	14.050	12.650	10.150	72.500
9	(Singapore) Kho Tong-yu	12.400	11.300	12.550	12.150	12.300	11.700	72.400
10	(Philippines) Jan Gwynn Timbang	12.550	11.750	11.200	13.250	11.400	11.550	71.700
11	(Singapore) Chong Jer rong	12.700	12.050	10.450	13.200	11.900	11.300	71.600
12	(Singapore) Junyi Kaeson Lim	11.800	12.350	9.700	13.200	11.150	11.950	70.150
13	(Thailand) Suphacheep Baobenmad	9.600	8.500	10.900	13.600	10.750	12.700	66.050
14	(Vietnam) Trịnh Hải Khang	13.200		11.750	14.700	13.500	11.500	64.650
15	(Malaysia) Sharul Aimy	13.450	12.250	11.850	13.400		11.700	62.650
16	(Philippines) John Ivan Cruz	13.700		10.700	14.050	12.000	11.600	62.050
17	(Philippines) Justine Ace De Leon	13.000	10.100	10.650	14.100	12.400		60.250
18	(Cambodia) Sun Vira	10.500	9.950	9.650	12.450	10.800	5.500	58.900
19	(Malaysia) Aiman Subri	12.550	10.200		11.650	12.000	10.850	57.250
20	(Cambodia) Vey Pheaktra	12.250	9.500	8.850	13.300	10.750		54.650
21	(Thailand) Tikumporn Surintornta	13.500		12.650	13.150			39.300
22	(Vietnam) Nguyễn Văn Khánh Phong		11.350	14.050	13.800			39.200
23	(Indonesia) Joseph Judah Hatoguan	13.600	9.450		14.450			37.500
24	(Indonesia) Abiyurafi Abiyurafi		11.850			12.150	12.650	36.650
25	(Cambodia) Ngoeun Sovanara		2.500	8.700	11.850	5.200	7.600	35.850
26	(Cambodia) Phon Sokchea	11.400		8.700	11.150		4.000	35.250
27	(Thailand) Weerapat Chuaisom		9.850			9.200	12.200	31.250
28	(Malaysia) Ally Hamuda Abdullah			13.500		12.550		26.050
29	(Cambodia) Vin Soksey		5.100	9.350	5.200	4.750		24.400
30	(Philippines) Jhon Romeo Santillan		11.500				11.050	22.550
31	(Vietnam) Đặng Ngọc Xuân Thiện		12.900					12.900
32	(Singapore) Terry Wei-an Tay	12.800						12.800
33	(Cambodia) Ten Vanndet	1.950	5.100		5.200			12.250

=== Men's artistic team all-around ===
Rank	Team	Floor (gymnastics)	Pommel horse	Rings (gymnastics)	Vault (gymnastics)	Parallel bars	Horizontal bar	Total
1st place, gold medalist(s)	Vietnam (VIE)	51.400	50.400	51.950	56.100	54.600	48.550	313.000
	Trịnh Hải Khang	13.200		11.750	14.700	13.500	11.500	64.650
	Đặng Ngọc Xuân Thiện		12.900					12.900
	Đinh Phương Thành	12.400	13.250	~~11.200~~	~~13.250~~	14.550	13.500	78.150
	Lê Thanh Tùng	13.500	12.900	13.200	13.550	13.900	13.400	80.450
	Nguyễn Văn Khánh Phong		11.350	14.050	13.800			39.200
	Văn Vĩ Lương	12.300	~~10.600~~	12.950	14.050	~~12.650~~	~~10.150~~	72.700
2nd place, silver medalist(s)	Philippines (PHI)	54.550	47.000	46.900	57.300	51.550	47.950	305.250
	Carlos Yulo	14.350	12.650	14.150	15.000	14.950	12.900	84.000
	Jan Gwynn Timbang	~~12.550~~	11.750	11.200	~~13.250~~	~~11.600~~	~~11.550~~	71.900
	Jhon Romeo Santillan		11.500				11.050	22.550
	John Ivan Cruz	13.700		~~10.700~~	14.050	12.000	11.600	62.050
	Juancho Miguel Besana	13.500	11.100	10.850	14.150	12.200	11.900	73.700
	Justine Ace De Leon	13.000	10.100	10.650	14.100	12.400		60.250
