= Chen Chih-yu =

Taiwanese artistic gymnast

Chen Chih-Yu
- Born: 29 September 1988 (age 37)

Gymnastics career
- Discipline: Men's artistic gymnastics
Medal record
Representing Chinese Taipei
Asian Games
Bronze medal – third place	2010 Guangzhou	Rings
Bronze medal – third place	2018 Jakarta	Rings

Chen Chih-yu (Chinese: 陳智郁; pinyin: Chén Zhìyù; born 29 September 1988) is a Taiwanese artistic gymnast. In 2018, he won the bronze medal in the men's rings event at the 2018 Asian Games held in Jakarta, Indonesia.

In 2016, he competed at the 2016 Gymnastics Olympic Test Event held in Rio de Janeiro, Brazil.
