= 2011 Philippine National Games =

2011 POC-PSC Games
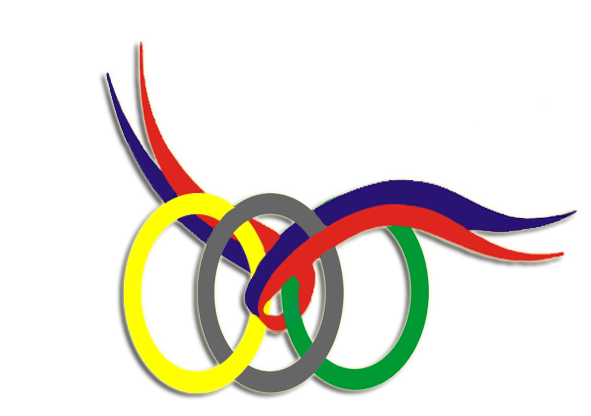
- Host city: Bacolod, Bago, Silay and Talisay; Negros Occidental
- Country: Philippines
- Opening: May 22, 2011
- Closing: May 29, 2011

The 2011 POC-PSC National Games was held at the cities of Bacolod, Bago, Silay and Talisay - Negros Occidental from May 22–29, 2011.

The Philippine National Games shall become a yearly national championships for all sports - to assess the expanse of athletic potentials as by-product of your national programs, to serve as the ultimate challenge grounds to bring out the best of the national crop and the emerging ones, and finally, to serve as the final "ranking and selection ground" for possible composition of the national pool, and from which the team for the future international competitions (e.g. SEA Games, Asian Games, Olympics, Etc. ... )

== Venues ==
=== Bacolod ===
- Fun run – 10K/5K/3K – Bacolod City New Government Center
- Athletics – Panaad Track Oval
- Badminton – Pohang Badminton Court
- Beach volleyball – St. La Salle University
- Billiards – Gaisano Mall
- Fencing – UNO-R Gym
- Gymnastics – St. John Institute/San Agustin College Gymnasium
- Judo – Riverside College
- Karatedo – Bacolod Arts Center/Bacolod City National High School
- Lawn tennis – Center Court Tennis Club/Noah's Haven
- Motorcycle sport – Bacolod City Airport Runway
- Sailing – Lopue Family Beach Resort
- Softball – Bacolod City National High School
- Soft tennis – UNO-R Gymnasium
- Swimming – Panaad Swimming Pool
- Taekwondo – Negros Occidental Multipurpose Activity Center
- Volleyball – St. La Salle University Covered Court
- Weightlifting – SM North Terminal
- Windsurfing – Lopue Family Beach Resort
- Wrestling – Bacolod Arts Center-Bacolod Nat’l High School

=== Bago ===
- Canoe-Kayak – Bantayan Park
- Dragon boat – Bantayan Park
- Muay Thai – Manuel Torres Coliseum and Cultural Center
- Wushu – Negros Occidental Multipurpose Activity Center

=== Talisay ===
- Cycling (Road Race) – Murcia Town
- Futsal – Talisay City Gymnasium
- Women's football– Carlos Hilado State College Football Field
- Pencak silat – Talisay Public Plaza
- Table tennis – Carlos Hilado State College Coliseum
- Wall climb – Bago City Rock Climbing Gym

=== Silay ===
- Archery – Doña Monserrat Lopez High School Football Field
- Arnis – City Plaza
- Sepak takraw – Natalio Velez Multi-Purpose Gym
- Triathlon – Marina Pacific Shore

== Sports ==
- Archery
- Arnis
- Athletics
- Badminton
- Baseball
- Beach volleyball
- Billiards
- Canoeing / Kayaking
- Cycling
- Dragon boat
- Fencing
- Football
- Futsal
- Gymnastics
- Judo
- Karatedo
- Lawn tennis
- Motorcycle sport
- Muay Thai
- Pencak silat
- Sailing
- Sepak takraw
- Soft tennis
- Softball
- Swimming
- Table tennis
- Taekwondo
- Triathlon
- Volleyball
- Wall climbing
- Weightlifting
- Windsurfing
- Wrestling
- Wushu

== Calendar ==
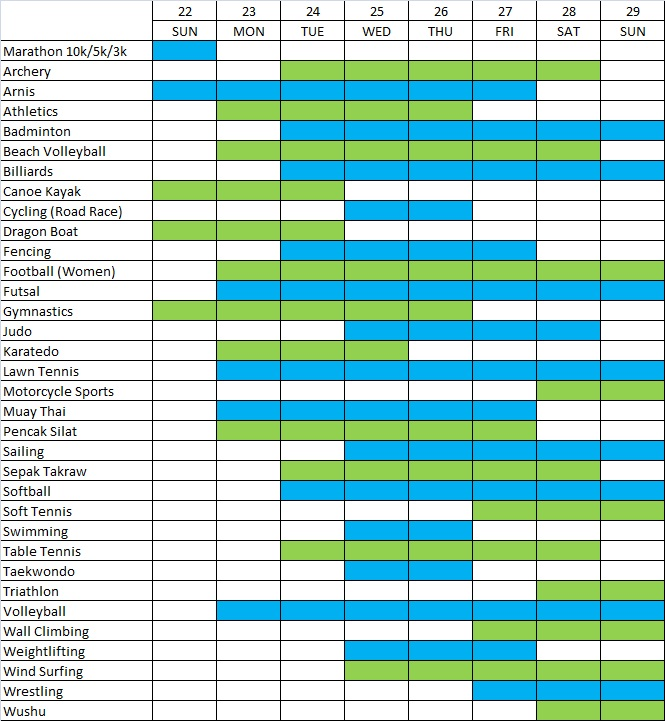

== Sponsors ==
- Smart
- P&G
- Scratch It! Instant Tama
- Summit
- Accel
- Zest Air
- Gatorade
- Negros Navigation
- Standard Insurance Co., Inc.
- Bodivance
- Philippine Daily Inquirer
- SuperFerry
- ABS-CBN
- The Philippine Star
- Province of Negros Occidental
- City of Bago
- City of Bacolod
- City of Silay
- City of Talisay
