= Agus Adi Prayoko =

Indonesian artistic gymnast (born 1989)

- Born: 4 May 1989 (age 37)

Gymnastics career
- Discipline: Men's artistic gymnastics
- Country represented: Indonesia
Medal record
Artistic Gymnastics
Representing Indonesia
Asian Games
Bronze medal – third place	2018 Jakarta–Palembang	Vault
SEA Games
Gold medal – first place	2019 Philippines	Vault
Silver medal – second place	2017 Kuala Lumpur	Vault
Bronze medal – third place	2011 Jakarta–Palembang	Team all-around

Agus Adi Prayoko (born 4 May 1989) is an Indonesian artistic gymnast. He won the bronze medal in the men's vault event at the 2018 Asian Games held in Jakarta, Indonesia.

In 2015, he competed in the men's vault event at the SEA Games held in Singapore.

In 2017, he won the silver medal in the men's vault event at the SEA Games held in Kuala Lumpur, Malaysia. Two years later, in 2019, he won the gold medal in the men's vault event at the 2019 SEA Games.
