= Loo Phay Xing =

Malaysian artistic gymnast (born 1997)

- Full name: Jeremiah Loo Phay Xing
- Born: 28 September 1997 (age 28) Penang, Malaysia
- Height: 1.65 m (5 ft 5 in)

Gymnastics career
- Discipline: Men's artistic gymnastics
- Country represented: Malaysia
- Head coach: Ng Shu Liang
Medal record
Representing Malaysia
Southeast Asian Games
Gold medal – first place	2017 Kuala Lumpur	Pommel horse
Silver medal – second place	2017 Kuala Lumpur	Team
Silver medal – second place	2015 Singapore	Horizontal bar
Bronze medal – third place	2017 Kuala Lumpur	Horizontal bar

Jeremiah Loo Phay Xing (born 28 September 1997) is a Malaysian former artistic gymnast. He competed at the 2014 Summer Youth Olympics and the 2020 Summer Olympics.

== Gymnastics career ==
Loo began gymnastics when he was seven years old. He represented Malaysia at the 2014 Summer Youth Olympics and advanced to the all-around final, finishing 18th. Additionally, he advanced to the pommel horse and parallel bars finals, finishing eighth and seventh, respectively. He began competing at the senior level in 2015 and won a silver medal on the horizontal bar at the 2015 SEA Games, behind Vietnam's Đinh Phương Thành.

Loo helped Malaysia win a silver medal in the team competition at the 2017 SEA Games. Individually, he tied with his teammate Tan Fu Jie for the pommel horse title. This marked Malaysia's first SEA Games gold medal in men's artistic gymnastics since 2005. He also won a bronze medal on the horizontal bar.

Loo advanced to the all-around final at the 2018 Commonwealth Games and finished 17th. There, he also qualified for the pommel horse final and finished eighth. Then at the 2018 Asian Games, he placed 14th in the all-around competition, and he helped Malaysia place tenth in the team qualifications.

Loo injured his left shoulder while training on the still rings in June 2019. Despite still being injured, he competed at the 2019 World Championships in the hopes of earning an Olympic berth, but he was unsuccessful. Then two weeks before the 2019 SEA Games, he re-injured his shoulder. He chose to only compete on the pommel horse, where he finished sixth.

Loo considered retirement after the 2019 season due to his injuries, but he continued to train and aimed to win an Olympic berth at the 2020 Asian Championships. Due to the postponement and eventual cancellation of the Asian Championships, the Olympic berths were reallocated based on the 2019 World Championships results, and Loo received a spot.

Loo represented Malaysia at the 2020 Summer Olympics and finished 62nd in the all-around during the qualification round. He became the second Malaysian Olympian in men's artistic gymnastics, after Ng Shu Wai competed at the 2004 Summer Olympics. He announced his retirement from gymnastics in February 2022, citing ongoing injury issues.
