= Lê Thanh Tùng =

Vietnamese artistic gymnast (born 1995)

- Born: 24 October 1995 (age 30) Ho Chi Minh City, Vietnam
- Height: 165 cm (5 ft 5 in)

Gymnastics career
- Discipline: Men's artistic gymnastics
- Country represented: Vietnam
- Head coach: Truong Minh Sang
Medal record
Representing Vietnam
Asian Championships
Gold medal – first place	2017 Bangkok	Vault
Bronze medal – third place	2019 Ulaanbaatar	Horizontal bar
Southeast Asian Games
Gold medal – first place	2015 Singapore	Team
Gold medal – first place	2015 Singapore	Vault
Gold medal – first place	2017 Kuala Lumpur	Team
Gold medal – first place	2017 Kuala Lumpur	Vault
Gold medal – first place	2017 Kuala Lumpur	Horizontal bar
Gold medal – first place	2021 Vietnam	Team
Gold medal – first place	2023 Cambodia	Team
Silver medal – second place	2021 Vietnam	All-around
Silver medal – second place	2023 Cambodia	All-around
Bronze medal – third place	2015 Singapore	Pommel horse
Bronze medal – third place	2019 Philippines	All-around
Bronze medal – third place	2019 Philippines	Vault
Bronze medal – third place	2019 Philippines	Parallel bars
FIG World Cup
Event	1st	2nd	3rd
Apparatus World Cup	1	0	0
World Challenge Cup	0	1	0
Total	1	1	0

Lê Thanh Tùng (born 24 October 1995) is a Vietnamese artistic gymnast. He is the 2017 Asian vault champion and the 2019 Asian horizontal bar bronze medalist. He is a seven-time SEA Games champion. He represented Vietnam at the 2020 Summer Olympics in Tokyo, Japan.

== Gymnastics career ==
Tùng began gymnastics at the age of five because his brother was also a gymnast. He moved to China at the age of eight to improve his training but returned home eight years later due to homesickness.

Tùng competed at the 2014 Asian Games and helped the Vietnamese team finish fifth, and he advanced into the all-around final, finishing eighth. He finished 83rd in the all-around qualifications at the 2014 World Championships. At the 2015 SEA Games, Tùng contributed to Vietnam's team gold medal. Individually, he won a gold medal in the vault final and a bronze medal in the pommel horse final.

Tùng won a gold medal on the vault at the 2017 Doha World Cup. He then won a vault gold medal at the 2017 Asian Championships. Then at the 2017 SEA Games, he helped Vietnam defend the team title by nearly 14 points. In the event finals, he won gold medals on the vault and horizontal bar.

Tùng competed at the 2018 Asian Games held in Jakarta, Indonesia, and helped Vietname finish fifth in the team event. He placed eighth in the all-around, fifth in the floor exercise final, and sixth in the vault final. At the 2018 Szombathely World Challenge Cup, he won a silver medal on the vault. He won the bronze medal on the horizontal bar at the 2019 Asian Championships despite competing with an injured ankle.

Tùng advanced to the vault final at the 2019 World Championships and placed fifth. As a result, he earned a berth to the 2020 Summer Olympics. He then competed at the 2019 SEA Games and won the all-around bronze medal behind Carlos Yulo and Đinh Phương Thành. He won two more bronze medals in the vault and parallel bars finals.

At the 2021 SEA Games, Tùng helped Vietnam win the team title, and he won the all-around silver medal behind Yulo. He then won bronze medals in the rings, parallel bars, and horizontal bar final. Due to an ankle injury, he only competed on the vault and the horizontal bar at the 2020 Summer Olympics, and he did not advance into either final. At the 2023 SEA Games, Tùng helped Vietnam defend its team title, and he won another all-around silver medal, once again behind Yulo.
