= Carlos Yulo =

Filipino artistic gymnast (born 2000)

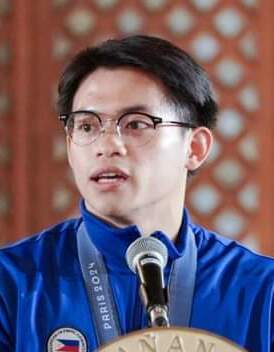
- Yulo in 2024

Personal information
- Full name: Carlos Edriel Poquiz Yulo
- Nickname: Caloy
- Born: February 16, 2000 (age 26) Malate, Manila, Philippines
- Height: 1.51 m (4 ft 11 in)
- Relatives: Eldrew Yulo (brother)

Gymnastics career
- Discipline: Men's artistic gymnastics
- Country represented: Philippines; (2018–present)
- Training location: Tokyo, Japan
- Head coach: Aldrin Castañeda
- Former coach: Munehiro Kugimiya
Medal record
Men's artistic gymnastics
Representing the Philippines
Event	1st	2nd	3rd
Olympic Games	2	0	0
World Championships	3	2	3
Asian Championships	12	2	4
Asian Games	2	0	0
SEA Games	9	9	0
Total	28	13	7
Olympic Games
Gold medal – first place	2024 Paris	Floor exercise
Gold medal – first place	2024 Paris	Vault
World Championships
Gold medal – first place	2019 Stuttgart	Floor exercise
Gold medal – first place	2021 Kitakyushu	Vault
Gold medal – first place	2025 Jakarta	Vault
Silver medal – second place	2021 Kitakyushu	Parallel bars
Silver medal – second place	2022 Liverpool	Vault
Bronze medal – third place	2018 Doha	Floor exercise
Bronze medal – third place	2022 Liverpool	Parallel bars
Bronze medal – third place	2025 Jakarta	Floor exercise
Asian Championships
Gold medal – first place	2022 Doha	Floor exercise
Gold medal – first place	2022 Doha	Vault
Gold medal – first place	2022 Doha	Parallel bars
Gold medal – first place	2023 Singapore	Floor exercise
Gold medal – first place	2023 Singapore	Vault
Gold medal – first place	2023 Singapore	Parallel bars
Gold medal – first place	2024 Tashkent	All-around
Gold medal – first place	2024 Tashkent	Floor exercise
Gold medal – first place	2024 Tashkent	Vault
Gold medal – first place	2024 Tashkent	Parallel bars
Gold medal – first place	2025 Jecheon	Floor exercise
Gold medal – first place	2026 Zunyi	Floor exercise
Silver medal – second place	2022 Doha	All-around
Silver medal – second place	2023 Singapore	All-around
Bronze medal – third place	2023 Singapore	Horizontal bar
Bronze medal – third place	2025 Jecheon	All-around
Bronze medal – third place	2025 Jecheon	Vault
Bronze medal – third place	2025 Jecheon	Parallel bars
Asian Games
Gold medal – first place	2026 Aichi–Nagoya	Floor exercise
Gold medal – first place	2026 Aichi–Nagoya	Vault
SEA Games
Gold medal – first place	2019 Philippines	All-around
Gold medal – first place	2019 Philippines	Floor exercise
Gold medal – first place	2021 Vietnam	All-around
Gold medal – first place	2021 Vietnam	Floor exercise
Gold medal – first place	2021 Vietnam	Still rings
Gold medal – first place	2021 Vietnam	Vault
Gold medal – first place	2021 Vietnam	Horizontal bar
Gold medal – first place	2023 Cambodia	All-around
Gold medal – first place	2023 Cambodia	Parallel bars
Silver medal – second place	2019 Philippines	Pommel horse
Silver medal – second place	2019 Philippines	Still rings
Silver medal – second place	2019 Philippines	Vault
Silver medal – second place	2019 Philippines	Parallel bars
Silver medal – second place	2019 Philippines	Horizontal bar
Silver medal – second place	2021 Vietnam	Team
Silver medal – second place	2021 Vietnam	Parallel bars
Silver medal – second place	2023 Cambodia	Team
Silver medal – second place	2023 Cambodia	Still rings
FIG World Cup
Event	1st	2nd	3rd
Apparatus World Cup	5	4	6
Total	5	4	6
- Military career
- Allegiance: Philippines
- Branch: Philippine Navy
- Service years: 2024–present
- Unit: Naval Reserve Command

Carlos Edriel Poquiz Yulo (born February 16, 2000) is a Filipino artistic gymnast. He is the 2024 Olympic floor exercise and vault champion. Yulo is the first Filipino and Southeast Asian to win multiple gold medals in the history of the Olympic Games. He is the first Filipino and the first male Southeast Asian gymnast to medal at the World Artistic Gymnastics Championships with his floor exercise bronze medal finish in 2018, as well as the first Filipino and Southeast Asian to achieve a gold medal finish for the same criteria in 2019 at the same event. With multiple medals on the international stage, Yulo is the second person to win an Olympic gold medal for the Philippines.

Yulo is a two-time Olympic champion, a three-time World champion, an eleven-time Asian champion, and a nine-time SEA Games champion. He is noted for his short stature compared to other male gymnasts, his precision in form, and the difficulty of his routines, especially in the floor exercise, vault, and parallel bars.

== Early life and education ==
Carlos Edriel Poquiz Yulo was born on February 16, 2000 to Mark Andrew Yulo, a travel agent liaison, and Angelica Yulo (née Poquiz), a homemaker, in Manila, Philippines. His maternal grandmother is Angelita Poquiz, and he lived along Leveriza Street, Malate. He is the second of four siblings. His older sister, Joriel, is a member of the National University Pep Squad, and his younger siblings, Karl Jahrel Eldrew and Elaiza Andriel, are also gymnasts. Yulo grew up watching Filipino gymnasts train and compete at the Rizal Memorial Sports Complex in Malate. Yulo started training for gymnastics when he was seven years old, when his grandfather, Rodrigo Frisco, saw him tumbling at a local playground and brought him to the Gymnastics Association of the Philippines (GAP) for training. He would also train at the Club Gymnastica in Kapitolyo, Pasig in his early years.

Yulo attended Aurora A. Quezon Elementary School in Malate, Manila for his primary education, where he was already training under AQES teacher-coach Ezra Canlas, for the Philippine National Games as part of the National Capital Region's gymnastics team. Through the support of the GAP, he was able to attend Adamson University in Ermita for his secondary education.

In 2016, Yulo accepted an offer from the Japan Olympic Association to train in Japan under a scholarship program. After moving to Japan, Yulo continued his education at Teikyo University in Itabashi, Tokyo, and graduated in 2022 with an associated degree in literature.

== Gymnastics career ==
=== Early career ===
Yulo started competing in 2008, and joined his first Palarong Pambansa in 2009 in Tacloban, Leyte. On May 1, he was part of the National Capital Region's gold medal-winning elementary team, finishing with a score of 79.35 and placing fifth in the individual all-around with a score of 26.15. The following day, he won the silver medal in the floor exercise, with a score of 13.325 with Marc Capistrano of Calabarzon taking first. Yulo stated that his second and fifth-place finishes encouraged him to train harder for his next Palarong Pambansa.

In 2010, Yulo competed in the Palarong Pambansa in Tarlac City, Tarlac, and took part in every event. He won gold in the individual all-around and floor exercise, and got bronze in the vault. He was also part of the men's team, where they placed fifth. The following year, he competed in the same competition in Dapitan, Zamboanga del Norte. He earned gold medals in the team event, individual all-around, floor-exercise, and vault. In the same year, he competed in his first Philippine National Games at the 2011 edition held in Bacolod, Negros Occidental, where he earned three gold medals in the floor exercise, rings, and parallel bars.

In 2012, he competed in the Palarong Pambansa in Lingayen, Pangasinan, and took part in every event. He won the gold in the individual all-around, floor exercise, and vault, as well as the team competition along with his teammates. The same year, he went to China alongside gymnast Jan Gwynn Timbang, for training after a sponsorship by the Philippine Good Works Mission Foundation given to the GAP. The training served as a bid for them to qualify for the 2014 Youth Olympics in Nanjing, China.

In 2013, Yulo competed in his last Palarong Pambansa, which was held in Dumaguete City, Negros Oriental. He won golds in the team event, individual all-around, and floor exercise, and took a silver in the vault behind Martoni Abana. In the same year, Yulo met his eventual coach, Munehiro Kugimiya, when Japanese trainers went to the Philippines to help train the national team.

=== Junior ===
As a junior, he was coached by Aldrin Castañeda. Yulo won gold medals on the floor exercise and the parallel bars at the 2014 ASEAN School Games. He then competed at the 2014 Pacific Rim Championships, finished sixth on the floor exercise and eighth on the vault. In 2015, he competed at the International Junior Competition held in Yokohama, Japan, and won a bronze medal in the vault final behind Youth Olympic medalists Giarnni Regini-Moran and Yue Ma.

In 2016, Kugimiya became Yulo's coach, and the MVP Sports Foundation started extending financial aid to his career the following year. He also received a scholarship from the International Gymnastics Federation to fund his move to Japan.

Yulo won five medals at the 2016 Pacific Rim Championships, gold on floor exercise and vault, silver on the still rings and parallel bars, and bronze in the all-around. Days before the 2017 Junior Asian Championships, he twisted his left ankle while training on the floor exercise. Despite the injury, he still competed, but he was limited to the still rings, pommel horse, and parallel bars. He qualified for the parallel bars final and won the gold medal. He only competed on the vault and floor exercise at the 2017 International Junior Competition because of a shoulder injury. He won the gold medal in the vault final and the silver medal in the floor exercise final.

=== Senior ===
==== 2018: Senior international debut and first World Championship medal ====
Yulo made his senior international debut at the Melbourne World Cup and won a bronze medal on the vault. Then, at the Baku World Cup, he won a silver medal on the vault. At the Doha World Cup, he won a silver medal on the floor exercise — his third international medal in the span of one month. At the 2018 Philippine National Games, held in Cebu City, Cebu, he won every individual gold medal. At the 2018 Asian Games, he scored highest on the floor exercise in the qualification round. However, in the event final he fell on his third tumbling pass and finished seventh.

At the World Championships in Doha, Yulo advanced to the all-around and floor exercise finals, becoming the first Filipino gymnast to qualify for a World Championships final. He was the youngest of the 24 competitors in the all-around final, and he finished 23rd. He won bronze in the floor exercise, becoming the first Filipino and the first male Southeast Asian gymnast to win a medal at the World Championships. After the World Championships, he competed at the Cottbus World Cup and won a bronze medal on the floor exercise after losing an execution score tiebreaker to Casimir Schmidt. In December, he won silver medals on the vault and parallel bars at the Toyota International.

==== 2019: First World title ====
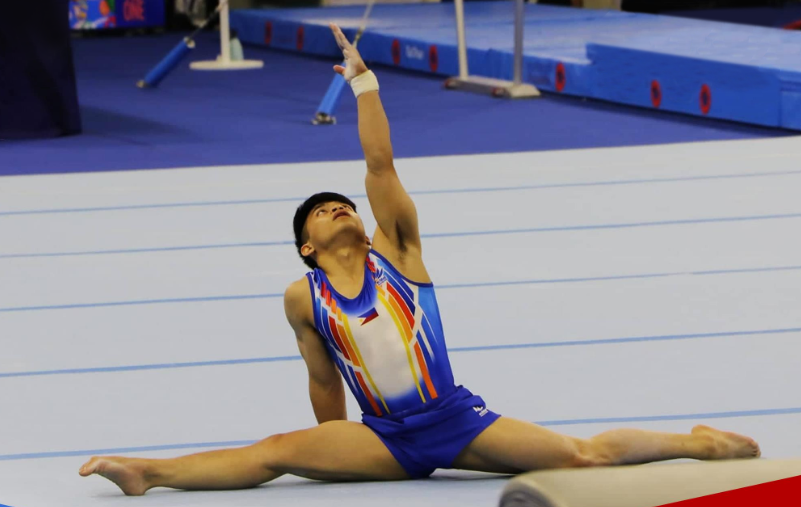
Yulo competing in the floor exercise at the 2019 SEA Games

Yulo began the 2019 season at the Melbourne World Cup where he won the gold medal on the floor exercise by 0.066 points. He missed the Baku World Cup due to a chest injury. He then won a bronze medal on the floor exercise at the Doha World Cup. At the Asian Championships, he placed fourth on the floor exercise and vault and seventh on the parallel bars. He tied for the gold medal on the floor exercise at the All-Japan Senior Championships with Kōhei Uchimura.

At the World Championships in Stuttgart, Yulo qualified for the all-around final and secured qualification to compete for the Philippines at the 2020 Summer Olympics in Tokyo. He then placed tenth in the all-around final with a personal-best all-around total. In the floor exercise final, he won the gold medal, making history as the first Filipino and Southeast Asian world champion in artistic gymnastics. After his win, his below average height of 4 feet 11 inches (1.50 m) made him an example by the Senate of the Philippines as a "wake-up call for our government" to provide more support for sports where height is not considered as a determinative factor.

After the World Championships, he competed at the Southeast Asian Games and finished on the podium in every event. He won gold in the all-around and floor exercise, and silver in the pommel horse, still rings, vault, parallel bars, and horizontal bar.

==== 2020–21 ====
Most international competitions in 2020 were canceled or postponed due to the COVID-19 pandemic. Yulo returned to competition in September 2020 at the All-Japan Senior Championships and won a bronze medal on the vault. He also won the vault bronze medal at the All-Japan Championships in addition to a bronze medal on the floor exercise.

Yulo began the Olympic season by winning a bronze medal on the parallel bars at the All-Japan Event Championships. He then represented the Philippines at the 2020 Summer Olympics, hoping to become the country's first Olympic champion in any sport. During the qualification round, he fell on his first tumbling pass and failed to qualify for the floor exercise final. He also struggled on several of the other events and missed the all-around final. However, he did qualify for the vault final in sixth place. As the youngest competitor in the vault final, he finished in fourth place, missing the bronze medal by 0.017 points.

After the Olympic Games, Yulo competed at the All-Japan Senior Championships and won a gold medal on the floor exercise and a bronze medal on the vault. He then competed at the 2021 World Championships in Kitakyushu, Japan. He qualified for both the floor exercise and parallel bars finals in first place, and he also qualified for the vault final. He only finished fifth in the floor exercise final after stepping out of bounds. He then won the gold medal in the vault final and a silver medal in the parallel bars final behind China's Hu Xuwei.

==== 2022 ====
At the Southeast Asian Games, Yulo led the Filipino team to a silver-medal finish behind Vietnam, and he won the gold medal in the all-around. Then in the event finals, he won gold in the floor exercise, still rings, vault, and horizontal bar, and he won a silver medal on the parallel bars. He won his first-ever senior continental championships title when he clinched the gold medal at the floor exercise of the Asian Championships in Doha after taking silver in the individual all-around. He followed this up with gold medals in the vault and parallel bars.

Yulo competed at the World Championships in Liverpool and qualified for the all-around, floor exercise, vault, and parallel bars finals. He was also the second reserve for the still rings final after finishing tenth in the qualification round. In the all-around final, he finished in eighth place due to mistakes on the pommel horse, vault and horizontal bar. He then fell in the floor exercise final and finished seventh. The next day, he won the silver medal in the vault final behind Armenia's Artur Davtyan, and he also won a bronze medal in the parallel bars final.

==== 2023 ====
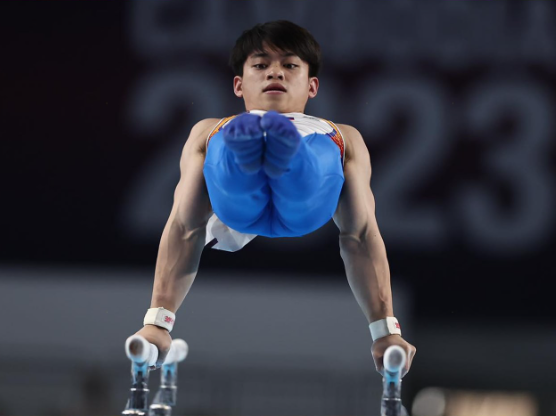
Yulo competing on the parallel bars at the 2023 SEA Games

Yulo began the season at the Cottbus World Cup and won a bronze medal in parallel bars. Then at the World Cup in Doha, he won gold on the floor exercise, silver on the parallel bars, and bronze on the vault. He then won two gold medals at the Baku World Cup, on the vault and parallel bars. At the Southeast Asian Games, he led the Philippines team to a silver-medal finish behind Vietnam, and he defended his all-around title. Then in the event finals, he won the gold on parallel bars and the silver on still rings.

Yulo competed at the Asian Championships and won a silver medal in the all-around behind Japan's Shinnosuke Oka. He won three gold medals in the event finals on floor exercise, vault, and parallel bars, and he won a bronze medal on the horizontal bar. After the Asian Championships, Yulo parted ways with long-time coach Kugimiya due to personal reasons. The separation was cordial with Yulo expressing gratitude to the Japanese coach a year later. He went back to Castañeda, who coached him as a junior. Yulo chose to not compete at the 2022 Asian Games (postponed to 2023), which were being held at the same time as World Championships.

During the qualification round of the World Championships, Yulo fell onto his back on his still rings dismount, and he also crashed his vault and was given a score of 0 for not landing feet-first. He finished last out of the 91 gymnasts who competed in the all-around. However, he still qualified for the floor exercise final where he finished fourth. As the highest-ranked gymnast on floor exercise who had not already qualified through the team or all-around competitions, Yulo qualified for the 2024 Olympic Games.

==== 2024: Olympic champion titles ====
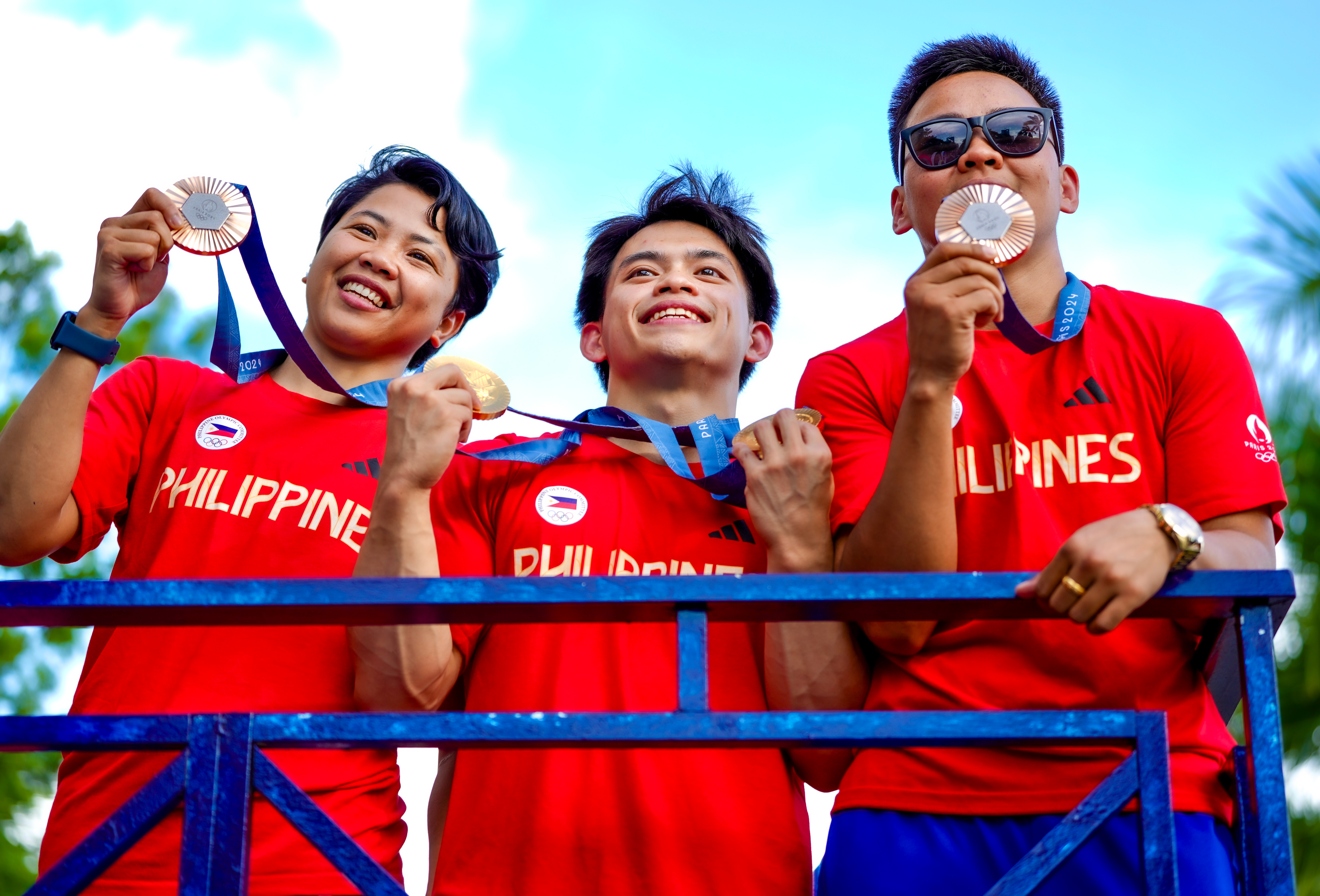
Yulo (center) with Aira Villegas (left) and Nesthy Petecio (right) holding their medals at a parade after the 2024 Summer Olympics

Tomoharu Sano was to replace Kugimiya as Yulo's new coach but withdrew from the role. Instead in February 2024, Yulo trained with Lee Jun-ho in South Korea and Jake Jarman in Lilleshall, England.

Yulo began the 2024 season with a bronze medal on the floor exercise at the Baku World Cup. Then at the Doha World Cup, he won a gold medal on the parallel bars and a silver medal on the vault. He won his first continental championship all-around title at the Asian Championships in Tashkent. He won three more gold medals in the event finals, on floor exercise, vault, and parallel bars.

During the qualification round of the 2024 Summer Olympics in Paris, France, he qualified for the men's individual all-around, vault, and floor. He first competed in the individual all-around final on July 31, placing 12th overall with a total score of 83.032 points.

On August 3, he competed in the men's floor exercise final and placed first with a score of 15.000 points. He became the first Filipino man and first Filipino gymnast to win an Olympic gold medal; he is the second Filipino ever to win an Olympic gold medal, after Hidilyn Diaz's victory in the women's 55 kg weightlifting event in Tokyo. The following day, Yulo won his second gold at the Games in the vault, scoring 15.116 points to become the Philippines' first-ever multiple-time Olympic champion.

As a result of his Olympic achievements, the government and other private entities pledged numerous incentives for Yulo, including but not limited to residential properties.

After the 2024 Summer Olympics, Yulo announced that he would take a break and would not be taking part in tournaments for the rest of the year. The Gymnastics Association of the Philippines expressed plans to hire a foreign coach for Yulo and other gymnasts, intending to send a gymnastics team for the 2028 Summer Olympics in Los Angeles. However, in October 2024, it was decided that Aldrin Castañeda will remain Yulo's personal coach.

==== 2025–present ====
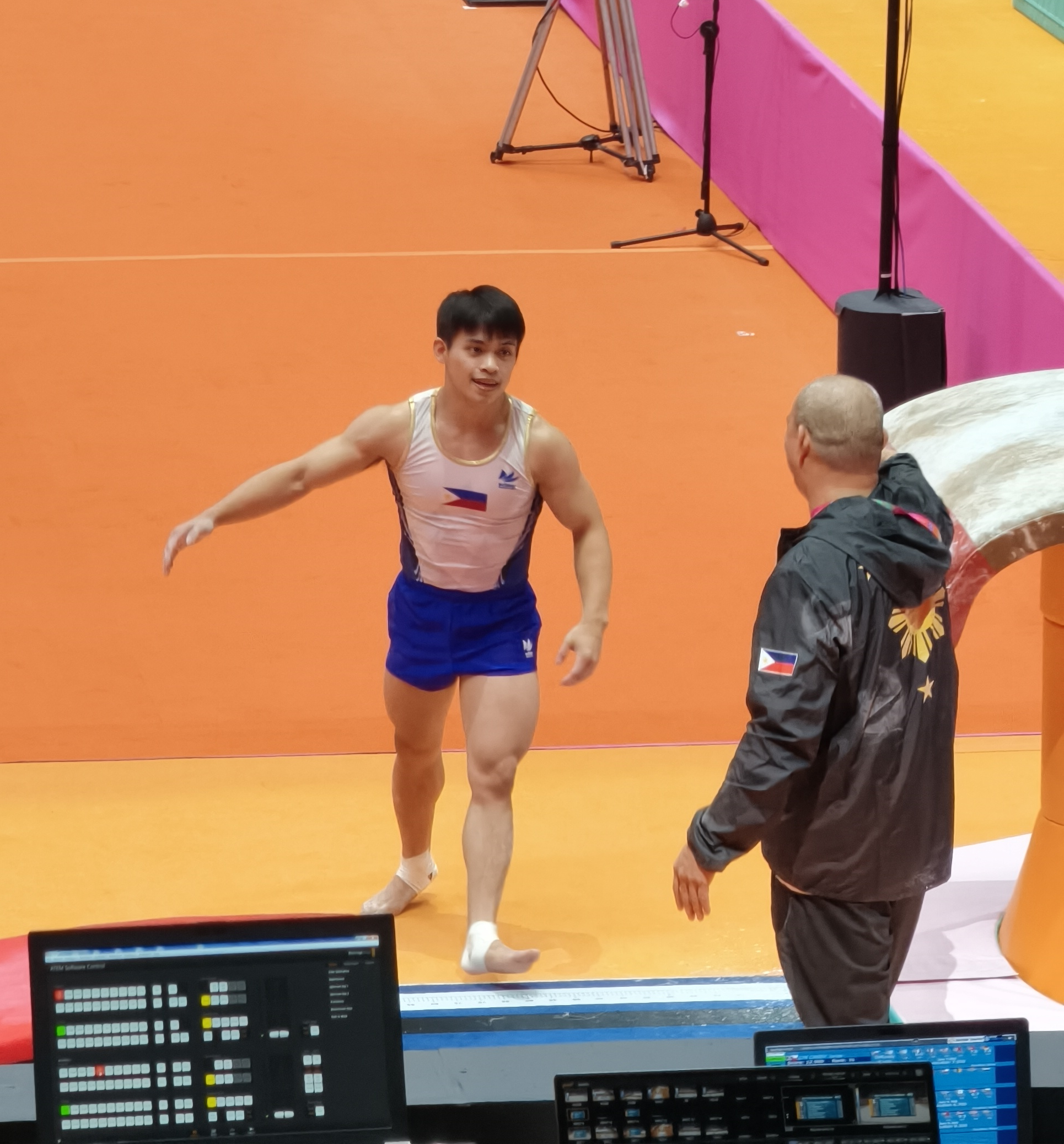
Yulo at the 2025 World Championships

Yulo returned to training by January 2025. His first tournament after the 2024 Olympics was the 2025 Asian Championships in Jecheon, South Korea. He won his fourth consecutive gold in the floor exercise, and three bronze medals in parallel bars, vault, and all-around.

Yulo skipped the 2025 SEA Games in Thailand, after the organizers imposed a restriction on the gymnastics event which made athletes only eligible to compete in one apparatus.

At the 2026 Asian Championships in Zunyi, China, Carlos Yulo competed alongside his younger brother Eldrew in the senior division. In the floor exercise, the elder Yulo won the gold medal while the younger won bronze, sharing the podium together. At the 2026 Asian Games in Aichi-Nagoya, Japan, Yulo won gold medals in floor exercise and vault. Yulo finished the year competing at the 2026 World Championships. While there he qualified to the floor exercise and vault finals. During the floor exercise final, Yulo fell on his second pass and ended the competition in eighth place. During the vault final, Yulo fell on his first vault but cleanly executed his second vault; he finished seventh overall.

== Personal life ==
Yulo and his fiancée Chloe Anjeleigh San Jose, a content creator-student from Melbourne, Australia, began their long-distance relationship in 2020. They were initially limited in interacting through their phones due to the COVID-19 pandemic before eventually started seeing each other in-person. On September 28, 2026, they made a public announcement revealing that they have been engaged since December 18, 2025.

Yulo is estranged from his mother, Angelica, whom he has accused of misappropriating his funds. Both parties also acknowledge San Jose to be a reason for the strained relationship. The relationship came to wider public attention shortly after Yulo's first gold medal win at the 2024 Summer Olympics. The family feud persisted in the public consciousness at least up to September 2024, when Yulo said he had moved on from issues which are too personal to keep publicly commenting on.

In October 2024, Yulo joined the Philippine Navy as a reservist with the rank of Petty Officer First Class.

== Competitive history ==
Competitive history of Carlos Yulo at the youth level
Year	Event	Team	AA	FX	PH	SR	VT	PB	HB
2009
2009	Palarong Pambansa	1st place, gold medalist(s)	5	2nd place, silver medalist(s)	—N/a	—N/a		—N/a	—N/a
2010
2010	Palarong Pambansa	5	1st place, gold medalist(s)	1st place, gold medalist(s)	—N/a	—N/a	3rd place, bronze medalist(s)	—N/a	—N/a
2011
2011	Palarong Pambansa	1st place, gold medalist(s)	1st place, gold medalist(s)	1st place, gold medalist(s)	—N/a	—N/a	1st place, gold medalist(s)	—N/a	—N/a
2011	National Games			1st place, gold medalist(s)			1st place, gold medalist(s)	1st place, gold medalist(s)	
2012
2012	Palarong Pambansa	1st place, gold medalist(s)	1st place, gold medalist(s)	1st place, gold medalist(s)	—N/a	—N/a	1st place, gold medalist(s)	—N/a	—N/a
2013
2013	Palarong Pambansa	1st place, gold medalist(s)	1st place, gold medalist(s)	1st place, gold medalist(s)	—N/a	—N/a	2nd place, silver medalist(s)	—N/a	—N/a

Competitive history of Carlos Yulo at the junior level
Year	Event	Team	AA	FX	PH	SR	VT	PB	HB
2014
2014	ASEAN School Games			1st place, gold medalist(s)			2nd place, silver medalist(s)	1st place, gold medalist(s)	
2014	Pacific Rim Championships			6			8		
2015
2015	Toyota International Junior Competition						3rd place, bronze medalist(s)		
2016
2016	Pacific Rim Championships		3rd place, bronze medalist(s)	1st place, gold medalist(s)		2nd place, silver medalist(s)	1st place, gold medalist(s)	2nd place, silver medalist(s)	
2017
2017	Junior Asian Championships							1st place, gold medalist(s)	
2017	Toyota International Junior Competition			2nd place, silver medalist(s)			1st place, gold medalist(s)		

Competitive history of Carlos Yulo at the senior level
Year	Event	Team	AA	FX	PH	SR	VT	PB	HB
2018
2018	Melbourne World Cup			7			3rd place, bronze medalist(s)		
2018	Baku World Cup						2nd place, silver medalist(s)		
2018	Doha World Cup			2nd place, silver medalist(s)			5		
2018	National Games	—N/a	1st place, gold medalist(s)	1st place, gold medalist(s)	1st place, gold medalist(s)	1st place, gold medalist(s)	1st place, gold medalist(s)	1st place, gold medalist(s)	1st place, gold medalist(s)
2018	Asian Games		7	7			4		
2018	World Championships		23	3rd place, bronze medalist(s)					
2018	Cottbus World Cup			3rd place, bronze medalist(s)					
2018	Toyota International						2nd place, silver medalist(s)	2nd place, silver medalist(s)	
2019
2019	Melbourne World Cup			1st place, gold medalist(s)					
2019	Doha World Cup			3rd place, bronze medalist(s)					
2019	Asian Championships		8	4			4	7	
2019	All-Japan Senior Championships			1st place, gold medalist(s)					
2019	World Championships		10	1st place, gold medalist(s)					
2019	Southeast Asian Games		1st place, gold medalist(s)	1st place, gold medalist(s)	2nd place, silver medalist(s)	2nd place, silver medalist(s)	2nd place, silver medalist(s)	2nd place, silver medalist(s)	2nd place, silver medalist(s)
2020	All-Japan Senior Championships						3rd place, bronze medalist(s)		
2020	All-Japan Championships			3rd place, bronze medalist(s)			3rd place, bronze medalist(s)		
2021	All-Japan Event Championships							3rd place, bronze medalist(s)	
2021	Olympic Games						4		
2021	All-Japan Senior Championships			1st place, gold medalist(s)			3rd place, bronze medalist(s)		
2021	World Championships			5			1st place, gold medalist(s)	2nd place, silver medalist(s)	
2022	Southeast Asian Games	2nd place, silver medalist(s)	1st place, gold medalist(s)	1st place, gold medalist(s)	6	1st place, gold medalist(s)	1st place, gold medalist(s)	2nd place, silver medalist(s)	1st place, gold medalist(s)
2022	Asian Championships	9	2nd place, silver medalist(s)	1st place, gold medalist(s)		4	1st place, gold medalist(s)	1st place, gold medalist(s)	
2022	World Championships		8	7		R2	2nd place, silver medalist(s)	3rd place, bronze medalist(s)	
2022	All-Japan Team Championships	1st place, gold medalist(s)							
2023	Cottbus World Cup							3rd place, bronze medalist(s)	
2023	Doha World Cup			1st place, gold medalist(s)			3rd place, bronze medalist(s)	2nd place, silver medalist(s)	
2023	Baku World Cup					7	1st place, gold medalist(s)	1st place, gold medalist(s)	
2023	Southeast Asian Games	2nd place, silver medalist(s)	1st place, gold medalist(s)			2nd place, silver medalist(s)		1st place, gold medalist(s)	
2023	Asian Championships	7	2nd place, silver medalist(s)	1st place, gold medalist(s)		4	1st place, gold medalist(s)	1st place, gold medalist(s)	3rd place, bronze medalist(s)
2023	World Championships			4				R2	
2024	Baku World Cup			3rd place, bronze medalist(s)					
2024	Doha World Cup						2nd place, silver medalist(s)	1st place, gold medalist(s)	
2024	Asian Championships	6	1st place, gold medalist(s)	1st place, gold medalist(s)		6	1st place, gold medalist(s)	1st place, gold medalist(s)	4
2024	Olympic Games		12	1st place, gold medalist(s)			1st place, gold medalist(s)		
2025
2025	Asian Championships	7	3rd place, bronze medalist(s)	1st place, gold medalist(s)		7	3rd place, bronze medalist(s)	3rd place, bronze medalist(s)	7
2025	World Championships			3rd place, bronze medalist(s)			1st place, gold medalist(s)		
2026
2026	Asian Championships	7	4	1st place, gold medalist(s)				6	5
2026	Asian Games	6	9	1st place, gold medalist(s)		R2	1st place, gold medalist(s)	4	
2026	World Championships			8			7		

== Awards and honors ==
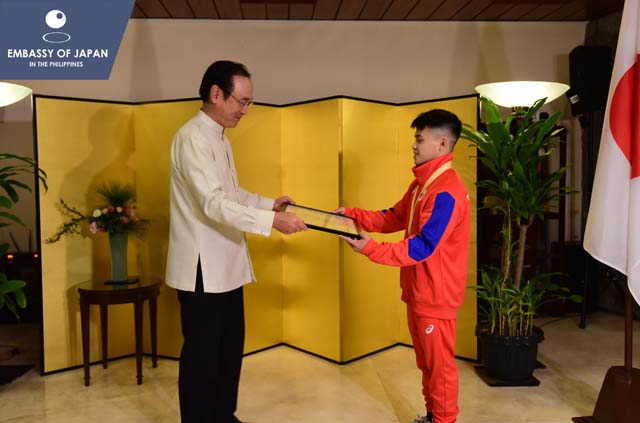
Yulo receiving an award from Ambassador of Japan to the Philippines Koji Haneda

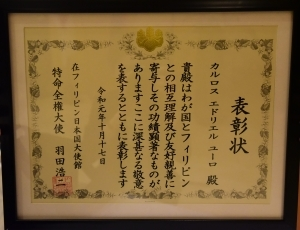
Award given to Yulo by Haneda for his "efforts in enhancing the relationship between Japan and the Philippines."

=== Awards ===
Name of the award ceremony, year presented, award category, and the result of the nomination
Award ceremony	Year	Category	Result	Ref.
KG Management Awards	2022	GAP-KG MVP Award	Won	
PSA Annual Awards	2018	Minor citation	Honored	
PSA Annual Awards	2019	Major award	Honored	
PSA Annual Awards	2020	President's Award	Honored	
PSA Annual Awards	2022	President's Award	Honored	
PSA Annual Awards	2023	Major award	Honored	
PSA Annual Awards	2024	Major award	Honored	
PSA Annual Awards	2025	PSA Athlete of the Year	Honored	
Siklab Sports Youth Awards	2018	POC Young Heroes Award	Honored	

=== Other awards ===
Name of award, awarder, year presented, for...
Award	Awarder	Year	For...	Ref.
Ambassador Commendation	Embassy of Japan to the Philippines, Ambassador Koji Haneda	2019	...his "efforts in enhancing the relationship between Japan and the Philippines."	

=== National honors ===
- Philippines:
  - Presidential Medal of Merit (2024)

=== Listicles ===
Name of publisher, name of listicle, year(s) listed, and placement result
Publisher	Listicle	Year(s)	Result	Ref.
Forbes	30 Under 30 Asia – Entertainment & Sports	2020	Placed	
