= Đinh Phương Thành =

Vietnamese artistic gymnast (born 1995)

- Born: 3 September 1995 (age 31) Hanoi, Vietnam
- Height: 170 cm (5 ft 7 in)

Gymnastics career
- Discipline: Men's artistic gymnastics
- Country represented: Vietnam
Medal record
Representing Vietnam
Asian Games
Bronze medal – third place	2014 Incheon	Parallel bars
Asian Championships
Bronze medal – third place	2017 Bangkok	Parallel bars
Bronze medal – third place	2019 Ulaanbaatar	Parallel bars
Southeast Asian Games
Gold medal – first place	2015 Singapore	Team
Gold medal – first place	2015 Singapore	All-around
Gold medal – first place	2015 Singapore	Parallel bars
Gold medal – first place	2015 Singapore	Horizontal bar
Gold medal – first place	2017 Kuala Lumpur	Team
Gold medal – first place	2017 Kuala Lumpur	Parallel bars
Gold medal – first place	2019 Philippines	Parallel bars
Gold medal – first place	2019 Philippines	Horizontal bar
Gold medal – first place	2021 Vietnam	Team
Gold medal – first place	2023 Cambodia	Team
Gold medal – first place	2023 Cambodia	Horizontal bar
Gold medal – first place	2025 Thailand	Men's parallel bars
Silver medal – second place	2019 Philippines	All-around
Silver medal – second place	2017 Kuala Lumpur	Horizontal bar
Silver medal – second place	2023 Cambodia	Parallel bars
Bronze medal – third place	2019 Philippines	Pommel horse
Bronze medal – third place	2021 Vietnam	All-around
Bronze medal – third place	2023 Cambodia	All-around
Bronze medal – third place	2025 Thailand	Horizontal bar
FIG World Cup
Event	1st	2nd	3rd
Apparatus World Cup	0	0	1
World Challenge Cup	1	0	0
Total	1	0	1

Đinh Phương Thành (born 3 September 1995) is a Vietnamese artistic gymnast. He is the 2014 Asian Games bronze medalist in the parallel bars. He is an 11-time SEA Games champion, and he represented Vietnam at the 2020 Summer Olympics.

== Gymnastics career ==
Thành's family put him into gymnastics to improve his health because he was frequently sick as a child. When he was seven, he moved to China to improve his training.

=== 2014–2015 ===
Thành competed at the 2014 Asian Games and helped the Vietnamese team finish fifth. He advanced into the parallel bars final and won the bronze medal behind Yuya Kamoto and Anton Fokin. At the 2015 SEA Games, he helped Vietnam win the team gold medal. He then won the gold medal in the all-around final with a total score of 86.150, becoming the first Vietnamese male artistic gymnast to win the SEA Games all-around title. He won two more gold medals in the parallel bars and horizontal bar final.

=== 2017–2020 ===
At the 2017 Asian Championships, Thành won a bronze medal on the parallel bars. Then at the 2017 SEA Games, he helped Vietnam defend the team title by nearly 14 points. In the event finals, he won a gold medal on the parallel bars and a silver medal on the horizontal bar. He won a gold medal on the parallel bars at the 2018 Koper World Challenge Cup. He then competed at the 2018 Asian Games and helped Vietname finish fifth in the team event.

Thành won his second consecutive parallel bars bronze medal at the 2019 Asian Championships. Then at the 2019 SEA Games, he won the all-around silver medal behind Carlos Yulo. In the event finals, he won gold medals on the parallel bars and horizontal bar and a bronze medal on the pommel horse. He won the parallel bars bronze medal at the 2020 Melbourne World Cup.

=== 2021–2025 ===
Because the 2021 Asian Championships were canceled due to the COVID-19 pandemic, the two Olympic berths that would have been awarded there were reallocated based on the results of the 2019 World Championships, and Thành received one of the spots. At the 2020 Summer Olympics, he only competed on the parallel bars and did not advance into the final.

Thành competed at the 2021 SEA Games and helped Vietnam win the team title, and he won the all-around bronze medal behind Carlos Yulo and teammate Lê Thanh Tùng. In the event finals, he won gold medals on both the parallel bars and the horizontal bar. Then at the 2023 SEA Games, he helped Vietnam defend its team title, and he won another all-around bronze medal, once again behind Yulo and Lê. He successfully defended his horizontal bar title but lost in the parallel bars final to Yulo.

Thành finished fourth in the parallel bars final at the 2025 Asian Championships.
