= Gymnastics at the 2015 SEA Games =

- Venue: Bishan Sports Hall
- Dates: 6–14 June 2015
- Competitors: 94 quota limit

Gymnastics competitions at the 2015 SEA Games were held in the Bishan Sports Hall, Singapore from 6 to 14 June 2015.

== Participating nations ==
Artistic

66 athletes from eight nations were due to compete in artistic gymnastics:

- Cambodia (1)
- Indonesia (7)
- Malaysia (10)
- Myanmar (5)
- Philippines (9)
- Singapore (12)
- Thailand (12)
- Vietnam (10)

Rhythmic

28 athletes from 5 nations were due to compete in rhythmic gymnastics:

- Indonesia (2)
- Malaysia (8)
- Singapore (8)
- Thailand (8)
- Vietnam (2)

== Competition schedule ==
The schedule for the gymnastics competitions was:

| Q | Qualification | F | Final |

Artistic
| Event↓/Date → | Sat 6 | Sun 7 | Mon 8 | Tue 9 | Wed 10 | Thu 11 | Fri 12 | Sat 13 | Sun 14 |
|---|---|---|---|---|---|---|---|---|---|
| Men's team | F | | | | | | | | |
| Men's individual all-around | | | F | | | | | | |
| Men's floor | | | | F | | | | | |
| Men's pommel horse | | | | F | | | | | |
| Men's rings | | | | F | | | | | |
| Men's vault | | | | | F | | | | |
| Men's parallel bars | | | | | F | | | | |
| Men's horizontal bar | | | | | F | | | | |
| Women's team | | F | | | | | | | |
| Women's individual all-around | | | F | | | | | | |
| Women's vault | | | | F | | | | | |
| Women's uneven bars | | | | F | | | | | |
| Women's balance beam | | | | | F | | | | |
| Women's floor | | | | | F | | | | |

Rhythmic
| Event↓/Date → | Sat 6 | Sun 7 | Mon 8 | Tue 9 | Wed 10 | Thu 11 | Fri 12 | Sat 13 | Sun 14 |
|---|---|---|---|---|---|---|---|---|---|
| Group all-around | | | | | | | | | F |
| Individual all-around | | | | | | | | | F |

== Medalists ==
=== Men's artistic ===
| Event | Gold | Silver | Bronze |
|---|---|---|---|
| Team | Vietnam (VIE); Đặng Nam; Hoàng Cường; Lê Thanh Tùng; Đinh Phương Thành; Phạm Phước Hưng; Đỗ Vũ Hưng | Thailand (THA); Tissanupan Wichianpradit; Robert Tee Kriangkum; Ratthasat Kanboon; Jamorn Prommanee; Weena Chokpaoumpai; Rartchawat Kaewpanya | Singapore (SIN); Timothy Tay; Terry Tay; Gabriel Gan; Hoe Wah Toon; Aizat Muhammad Jufrie; Gregory Gan |
| Individual all-around | Đinh Phương Thành; Vietnam | Phạm Phước Hưng; Vietnam | Gabriel Gan; Singapore |
| Floor | Reyland Capellan; Philippines | Hoe Wah Toon; Singapore | Phạm Phước Hưng; Vietnam |
| Pommel horse | Rartchawat Kaewpanya; Thailand | Gabriel Gan; Singapore | Lê Thanh Tùng; Vietnam |
| Rings | Đặng Nam; Vietnam | Phạm Phước Hưng; Vietnam | Weena Chokpaoumpai; Thailand |
| Vault | Lê Thanh Tùng; Vietnam | Hoàng Cường; Vietnam | Reyland Capellan; Philippines |
| Parallel bars | Đinh Phương Thành; Vietnam | Rartchawat Kaewpanya; Thailand | Phạm Phước Hưng; Vietnam |
| Horizontal bar | Đinh Phương Thành; Vietnam | Loo Phay Xing; Malaysia | Aizat Muhammad Jufrie; Singapore |

=== Women's artistic ===
| Event | Gold | Silver | Bronze |
|---|---|---|---|
| Team | Malaysia (MAS); Tracie Ang; Farah Ann Abdul Hadi; Tan Ing Yueh; Nur Eli Ellina Azmi; Siti Nur Bahirah Ahmad; Lavinia Michelle Jayadev | Singapore (SIN); Kelsie Muir; Michelle Teo; Ashly Lau; Janessa Dai; Nadine Nathan; Zeng Qiyan | Philippines (PHI); Rachelle Arellano; Ma. Cristina Onofre; Elizabeth Leduc; Ava Verdeflor; Sofia Isabel Gonzalez |
| Individual all-around | Phan Thị Hà Thanh; Vietnam | Farah Ann Abdul Hadi; Malaysia | Nadine Nathan; Singapore |
| Vault | Phan Thị Hà Thanh; Vietnam | Tan Ing Yueh; Malaysia | Farah Ann Abdul Hadi; Malaysia |
| Uneven bars | Tan Ing Yueh; Malaysia | Ava Verdeflor; Philippines | Farah Ann Abdul Hadi; Malaysia |
| Balance beam | Phan Thị Hà Thanh; Vietnam | Đỗ Thị Vân Anh; Vietnam | Farah Ann Abdul Hadi; Malaysia |
| Floor | Farah Ann Abdul Hadi; Malaysia | Rifda Irfanaluthfi; Indonesia | Phan Thị Hà Thanh; Vietnam |

=== Rhythmic ===
| Event | Gold | Silver | Bronze |
|---|---|---|---|
| Group all-around | Singapore (SIN); Dawne Chua Yun Xi; Noelle Goh; Edlyn Ho Zen Yee; Ann Sim Kwee Peng; Alison Tang Wan Xuan | Malaysia (MAS); Chai Xin Nong; Chan Mei Thung; Loo Shiow Yng; Thew Yue Jia; Yap Qian Ling; Yap Sin Lu | Not awarded |
| Individual all-around | Sie Yan Koi; Malaysia | Shared gold | Panjarat Prawatyotin; Thailand |
| Individual all-around | Shasangari Sivaneswari Nagarajan; Malaysia | Shared gold | Panjarat Prawatyotin; Thailand |

== Medal table ==
* Host nation (Singapore)

| Rank | Nation | Gold | Silver | Bronze | Total |
|---|---|---|---|---|---|
| 1 | Vietnam (VIE) | 9 | 4 | 4 | 17 |
| 2 | Malaysia (MAS) | 5 | 4 | 3 | 12 |
| 3 | Singapore (SIN)* | 1 | 3 | 4 | 8 |
| 4 | Thailand (THA) | 1 | 2 | 2 | 5 |
| 5 | Philippines (PHI) | 1 | 1 | 2 | 4 |
| 6 | Indonesia (INA) | 0 | 1 | 0 | 1 |
| Totals (6 entries) | | 17 | 15 | 15 | 47 |
