= Gymnastics at the 2015 SEA Games – Women's floor =

Gymnastics – Women's floor at the 2015 SEA Games
- Venue: Bishan Sports Hall
- Date: 10 June 2015
- Competitors: 8 from 5 nations

Medalists
gold medal	Farah Ann Abdul Hadi	Malaysia
silver medal	Rifda Irfanaluthfi	Indonesia
bronze medal	Phan Thị Hà Thanh	Vietnam

The Women's floor competition at the 2015 SEA Games was held on 10 June 2015 at the Bishan Sports Hall in Singapore.

== Schedule ==
All times are Singapore Standard Time (UTC+8).

Date	Time	Event
Sunday, 7 June 2015	13:00	Qualification
Wednesday, 10 June 2015	15:20	Final

== Qualification ==
Qualification took place on 7 June 2015 as part of the team and individual qualification event.

== Results ==
Source: Results - Women's floor

Pos.	Gymnast	D Score	E Score	Penalty	Total
1st place, gold medalist(s)	Farah Ann Abdul Hadi (MAS)	5.300	8.433		13.733
2nd place, silver medalist(s)	Rifda Irfanaluthfi (INA)	5.300	8.400		13.700
3rd place, bronze medalist(s)	Phan Thị Hà Thanh (VIE)	5.300	8.133		13.433
4	Tan Ing Yueh (MAS)	4.900	8.433		13.333
5	Nadine Nathan (SIN)	5.100	8.033		13.133
6	Janessa Dai (SIN)	4.800	8.300		13.100
7	Ava Verdeflor (PHI)	4.500	8.400		12.900
8	Elizabeth Leduc (PHI)	4.500	8.066		12.566
