= Gymnastics at the 2015 SEA Games – Women's balance beam =

Gymnastics – Women's floor at the 2015 SEA Games
- Venue: Bishan Sports Hall
- Date: 10 June 2015
- Competitors: 8 from 6 nations

Medalists
gold medal	Phan Thị Hà Thanh	Vietnam
silver medal	Đỗ Thị Vân Anh	Vietnam
bronze medal	Farah Ann Abdul Hadi	Malaysia

The Women's balance beam competition at the 2015 SEA Games was held on 10 June 2015 at the Bishan Sports Hall in Singapore.

== Schedule ==
All times are Singapore Standard Time (UTC+8).

Date	Time	Event
Sunday, 7 June 2015	13:00	Qualification
Wednesday, 10 June 2015	14:35	Final

== Qualification ==
Qualification took place on 7 June 2015 as part of the team and individual qualification event.

== Results ==
Source: Results - Women's balance beam

Pos.	Gymnast	D Score	E Score	Penalty	Total
1st place, gold medalist(s)	Phan Thị Hà Thanh (VIE)	5.700	8.366	0.100	13.966
2nd place, silver medalist(s)	Đỗ Thị Vân Anh (VIE)	5.000	8.333		13.333
3rd place, bronze medalist(s)	Farah Ann Abdul Hadi (MAS)	5.300	8.000		13.300
4	Rifda Irfanaluthfi (INA)	5.200	7.766		12.966
5	Elizabeth Leduc (PHI)	5.000	7.700		12.700
6	Nadine Nathan (SIN)	5.100	7.100		12.200
7	Praewpraw Doungchan (THA)	4.600	7.133		11.733
8	Ashly Lau (SIN)	5.300	5.966		11.266
