= Gymnastics at the 2017 SEA Games – Women's artistic team all-around =

Gymnastics – Women's artistic team at the 2017 SEA Games
- Venue: Malaysian International Trade & Exhibition Centre (MITEC)
- Date: 21 August 2017
- Competitors: 28 from 6 nations

Medalists
gold medal	Farah Ann Abdul Hadi; Lavinia Michelle Jayadev; Nur Azira Aziri; Nur Eli Ellina Azmi; Tan Ing Yueh; Tracie Ang	Malaysia
silver medal	Colette Chan Wan Xuan; Kelsie Yasmin Muir; Nadine Joy Nathan; Togawa Mei; Zeng Qiyan	Singapore
bronze medal	Amalia Fauziah Nurun Nubuwah; Armartiani; Rifda Irfanaluthfi; Tazsa Miranda Devira	Indonesia

The women's artistic team competition at the 2017 SEA Games was held on 21 August 2017 at the Hall 10, Level 3, Malaysian International Trade & Exhibition Centre (MITEC) in Kuala Lumpur, Malaysia.

The team competition also served as qualification for the event finals.

== Schedule ==
All times are Malaysia Standard Time (UTC+8).

Date	Time	Event
Monday, 21 August 2017	10:00	Final

== Results ==
Source: Results - Women's artistic team

Rank	Gymnast	Vault (gymnastics)	Uneven bars	Balance beam	Floor (gymnastics)	Total
1st place, gold medalist(s)	Malaysia (MAS)	52.600	50.250	48.950	49.150	200.950
	Tracie Ang	13.150	12.650	13.300	12.200	51.300
	Farah Ann Abdul Hadi	13.450	13.300	11.800	12.600	51.150
	Tan Ing Yueh	13.150	12.450	12.300	12.600	50.500
	Nur Azira Aziri	~~11.900~~	~~10.950~~	~~11.400~~	11.750	46.000
	Lavinia Raymund-Jayadev	12.850	11.850		~~11.400~~	
	Nur Eli Ellina Azmi			11.550		
2nd place, silver medalist(s)	Singapore (SIN)	49.300	48.050	44.500	48.200	190.050
	Zeng Qiyan	12.200	12.300	11.600	12.400	48.500
	Nadine Joy Nathan	12.700	~~11.350~~	11.900	12.500	48.450
	Colette Chan Wan Xuan	~~11.700~~	12.650	10.750	11.450	46.550
	Kelsie Yasmin Muir	12.600	11.350	~~9.800~~	11.850	45.600
	Togawa Mei	11.800	11.750	10.250	~~11.200~~	45.000
3rd place, bronze medalist(s)	Indonesia (INA)	50.350	42.400	49.250	44.850	186.850
	Rifda Irfanaluthfi	13.050	12.450	13.550	12.300	51.350
	Amalia Fauziah Nurun Nubuwah	12.550	10.550	12.550	11.100	46.750
	Tazsa Miranda Devi	12.250	10.200	12.550	10.900	45.900
	Armartiani	12.500	9.200	10.600	10.550	42.850
4	Philippines (PHI)	46.700	39.950	43.000	46.400	176.050
	Kaitlin De Guzman	10.000	12.800	12.050	12.550	47.400
	Ma. Cristina Onofre	12.800	9.500	11.450	12.350	46.100
	Katrina Marie Evangelista	12.100	8.300	9.850	11.600	41.850
	Mariana Josefa Hermoso	11.800	9.350	9.650	9.900	40.700
5	Vietnam (VIE)	49.550	35.000	40.400	43.050	168.000
	Bui Nguyen Hai Yen	12.700	10.950	9.600	11.450	44.700
	Truong Khanh Van	11.750	10.000	12.100	10.800	44.650
	Long Thi Ngoc Huynh	12.350	9.350	9.650	11.550	42.900
	Nguyen Thi Quynh Nhu	12.750	4.700	9.050	9.250	35.750
6	Thailand (THA)	?	31.200	41.250	42.050	?
	Kanyanat Boontoeng	?	9.100	9.450	11.300	?
	Thidaporn Khanthara	?	10.350	11.200	11.750	?
	Takyamon Atthavanich	12.550	2.250	9.600	8.750	33.150
	Karla Sue Kronpreya Frank	10.650		11.000	10.250	
	Nasha Janelle Manitkul-Davis		9.500			

== Qualification results ==
=== Vault ===
Pos.	Gymnast	Score 1	Score 2	Total	Notes
1	Rifda Irfanaluthfi (INA)	13.050	13.250	13.150	Q
2	Tracie Ang (MAS)	13.150	13.150	13.150	Q
3	Ma. Cristina Onofre (PHI)	12.800	13.050	12.925	Q
4	Kanyanat Boontoeng (THA)	?	?	12.900	Q
5	Tan Ing Yueh (MAS)	13.150	11.900	12.525	Q
6	Nguyen Thi Quynh Nhu (VIE)	12.750	12.050	12.400	Q
7	Amalia Fauziah Nurun Nubuwah (INA)	12.550	12.250	12.400	Q
8	Bui Nguyen Hai Yen (VIE)	12.700	11.900	12.300	Q
9	Thidaporn Khanthara (THA)	?	?	12.200	R1
10	Nadine Joy Nathan (SIN)	12.700	11.550	12.125	R2
11	Truong Khanh Van (VIE)	11.750	12.350	12.050	
12	Tazsa Miranda Devi (INA)	12.250	11.600	11.925	
−	Farah Ann Abdul Hadi (MAS)	13.450	−	13.450	
−	Lavinia Raymund-Jayadev (MAS)	12.850	−	12.850	
−	Kelsie Yasmin Muir (SIN)	12.600	−	12.600	
−	Takyamon Atthavanich (THA)	12.550	−	12.550	
−	Armartiani (INA)	12.500	−	12.500	
−	Long Thi Ngoc Huynh (VIE)	12.350	−	12.350	
−	Zeng Qiyan (SIN)	12.200	−	12.200	
−	Katrina Marie Evangelista (PHI)	12.100	−	12.100	
−	Nur Azira Aziri (MAS)	11.900	−	11.900	
−	Togawa Mei (SIN)	11.800	−	11.800	
−	Mariana Josefa Hermoso (PHI)	11.800	−	11.800	
−	Colette Chan Wan Xuan (SIN)	11.700	−	11.700	
−	Karla Sue Kronpreya Frank (THA)	10.650	−	10.650	
−	Kaitlin De Guzman (PHI)	10.000	−	10.000	

=== Uneven bars ===
Pos.	Gymnast	Difficulty	Execution	Penalty	Total	Notes
1	Farah Ann Abdul Hadi (MAS)	5.000	8.300		13.300	Q
2	Kaitlin De Guzman (PHI)	4.300	8.500		12.800	Q
3	Colette Chan Wan Xuan (SIN)	4.300	8.350		12.650	Q
4	Tracie Ang (MAS)	4.500	8.150		12.650	Q
5	Rifda Irfanaluthfi (INA)	4.200	8.250		12.450	Q
6	Tan Ing Yueh (MAS)	4.400	8.050		12.450	
7	Zeng Qiyan (SIN)	4.200	8.100		12.300	Q
8	Lavinia Raymund-Jayadev (MAS)	4.000	7.850		11.850	
9	Togawa Mei (SIN)	3.400	8.350		11.750	
10	Kelsie Yasmin Muir (SIN)	3.600	7.750		11.350	
11	Nadine Joy Nathan (SIN)	4.400	6.950		11.350	
12	Bui Nguyen Hai Yen (VIE)	2.900	8.050		10.950	Q
13	Nur Azira Aziri (MAS)	4.200	6.750		10.950	
14	Amalia Fauziah Nurun Nubuwah (INA)	2.800	7.750		10.550	Q
15	Thidaporn Khanthara (THA)	2.800	7.550		10.350	R1
16	Tazsa Miranda Devi (INA)	3.900	6.300		10.200	
17	Truong Khanh Van (VIE)	?	?		10.000	R2
18	Ma. Cristina Onofre (PHI)	1.900	7.600		9.500	R3
19	Nasha Janelle Manitkul-Davis (THA)	2.300	7.200		9.500	
20	Mariana Josefa Hermoso (PHI)	1.900	7.450		9.350	
21	Long Thi Ngoc Huynh (VIE)	3.300	6.050		9.350	
22	Armartiani (INA)	2.400	6.800		9.200	
23	Kanyanat Boontoeng (THA)	2.700	6.400		9.100	
24	Katrina Marie Evangelista (PHI)	1.900	6.400		8.300	
25	Nguyen Thi Quynh Nhu (VIE)	0.800	8.400	4.500	4.700	
26	Takyamon Atthavanich (THA)	0.700	5.550	4.000	2.250	

=== Balance beam ===
Pos.	Gymnast	Difficulty	Execution	Penalty	Total	Notes
1	Rifda Irfanaluthfi (INA)	5.100	8.450		13.550	Q
2	Tracie Ang (MAS)	4.800	8.500		13.300	Q
3	Tazsa Miranda Devi (INA)	4.400	8.150		12.550	Q
4	Amalia Fauziah Nurun Nubuwah (INA)	4.700	7.850		12.550	
5	Tan Ing Yueh (MAS)	5.000	7.300		12.300	Q
6	Truong Khanh Van (VIE)	4.500	7.600		12.100	Q
7	Kaitlin De Guzman (PHI)	4.400	7.650		12.050	Q
8	Nadine Joy Nathan (SIN)	4.600	7.300		11.900	Q
9	Farah Ann Abdul Hadi (MAS)	4.800	7.000		11.800	
10	Zeng Qiyan (SIN)	3.500	8.100		11.600	Q
11	Nur Eli Ellina Azmi (MAS)	4.200	7.350		11.550	
12	Ma. Cristina Onofre (PHI)	4.700	6.750		11.450	R1
13	Nur Azira Aziri (MAS)	4.400	7.000		11.400	
14	Thidaporn Khanthara (THA)	3.900	7.300		11.200	R2
15	Karla Sue Kronpreya Frank (THA)	3.600	7.400		11.000	R3
16	Colette Chan Wan Xuan (SIN)	4.700	6.050		10.750	
17	Armartiani (INA)	4.000	6.600		10.600	
18	Togawa Mei (SIN)	4.500	5.750		10.250	
19	Katrina Marie Evangelista (PHI)	4.200	5.650		9.850	
20	Kelsie Yasmin Muir (SIN)	4.800	5.000		9.800	
21	Long Thi Ngoc Huynh (VIE)	4.400	5.250		9.650	
22	Mariana Josefa Hermoso (PHI)	4.600	5.050		9.650	
23	Takyamon Atthavanich (THA)	4.300	5.300		9.600	
24	Bui Nguyen Hai Yen (VIE)	4.600	5.100	0.100	9.600	
25	Kanyanat Boontoeng (THA)	3.800	5.650		9.450	
26	Nguyen Thi Quynh Nhu (VIE)	3.400	5.650		9.050	

=== Floor exercise ===
Pos.	Gymnast	Difficulty	Execution	Penalty	Total	Notes
1	Tan Ing Yueh (MAS)	4.400	8.200		12.600	Q
2	Farah Ann Abdul Hadi (MAS)	4.500	8.100		12.600	Q
3	Kaitlin De Guzman (PHI)	4.500	8.050		12.550	Q
4	Nadine Joy Nathan (SIN)	4.800	7.700		12.500	Q
5	Zeng Qiyan (SIN)	4.200	8.200		12.400	Q
6	Ma. Cristina Onofre (PHI)	4.400	7.950		12.350	Q
7	Rifda Irfanaluthfi (INA)	4.700	7.700	0.100	12.300	Q
8	Tracie Ang (MAS)	4.400	7.800		12.200	
9	Kelsie Yasmin Muir (SIN)	4.300	7.550		11.850	
10	Thidaporn Khanthara (THA)	4.300	7.450		11.750	Q
11	Nur Azira Aziri (MAS)	4.400	7.350		11.750	
12	Katrina Marie Evangelista (PHI)	4.200	7.400		11.600	
13	Long Thi Ngoc Huynh (VIE)	3.900	7.650		11.550	R1
14	Colette Chan Wan Xuan (SIN)	3.500	7.950		11.450	
15	Bui Nguyen Hai Yen (VIE)	4.400	7.050		11.450	R2
16	Lavinia Raymund-Jayadev (MAS)	4.100	7.300		11.400	
17	Kanyanat Boontoeng (THA)	?	?		11.300	R3
18	Togawa Mei (SIN)	3.400	7.800		11.200	
19	Amalia Fauziah Nurun Nubuwah (INA)	4.200	6.900		11.100	
20	Tazsa Miranda Devi (INA)	4.300	6.600		10.900	
21	Truong Khanh Van (VIE)	4.700	6.600	0.500	10.800	
22	Armartiani (INA)	4.200	6.650	0.300	10.550	
23	Karla Sue Kronpreya Frank (THA)	3.100	7.150		10.250	
24	Mariana Josefa Hermoso (PHI)	4.400	5.500		9.900	
25	Nguyen Thi Quynh Nhu (VIE)	1.700	7.550		9.250	
26	Takyamon Atthavanich (THA)	3.300	5.450		8.750	
