= Gymnastics at the 2015 SEA Games – Women's artistic individual all-around =

Gymnastics – Women's artistic individual all-around at the 2015 SEA Games
- Venue: Bishan Sports Hall
- Date: 8 June 2015
- Competitors: 11 from 6 nations

Medalists
gold medal	Phan Thị Hà Thanh	Vietnam
silver medal	Farah Ann Abdul Hadi	Malaysia
bronze medal	Nadine Nathan	Singapore

The women's artistic individual all-around competition at the 2015 SEA Games was held on 8 June 2015 at the Bishan Sports Hall in Singapore.

== Medalists ==
Gold	Silver	Bronze
Phan Thị Hà Thanh (VIE)	Farah Ann Abdul Hadi (MAS)	Nadine Nathan (SIN)

== Schedule ==
All times are Singapore Standard Time (UTC+8).

Date	Time	Event
Sunday, 7 June 2015	13:00	Qualification
Monday, 8 June 2015	16:00	Final

== Qualification ==
Qualification took place on 7 June 2015 as part of the team and individual qualification event.

== Results ==
Source: Gymnastics – Artistic Women's Individual All-Around Final Results

Rank	Gymnast	Vault (gymnastics)	Uneven bars	Balance beam	Floor (gymnastics)	Total
1st place, gold medalist(s)	Phan Thị Hà Thanh (VIE)	14.500	11.900	13.500	13.750	53.650
2nd place, silver medalist(s)	Farah Ann Abdul Hadi (MAS)	13.750	12.300	12.050	13.750	51.850
3rd place, bronze medalist(s)	Nadine Nathan (SIN)	13.550	12.100	12.100	13.250	51.000
4	Ava Lorein Verdeflor (PHI)	13.000	12.450	12.200	12.750	50.400
5	Rifda Irfanaluthfi (INA)	13.700	10.550	12.850	12.500	49.600
6	Elizabeth LeDuc (PHI)	13.250	10.700	11.650	12.950	48.550
7	Tan Ing Yueh (MAS)	13.000	11.450	12.250	11.750	48.450
8	Janessa Dai (SIN)	13.050	10.850	10.200	13.100	47.200
9	Praewpraw Doungchan (THA)	13.350	11.550	10.000	12.000	46.900
10	Kanyanat Boontoeng (THA)	13.550	9.750	10.950	12.250	46.500
11	Đỗ Thị Vân Anh (VIE)	13.550	9.500	11.900	11.450	46.400
