= Gymnastics at the 2015 SEA Games – Men's floor =

Gymnastics – Men's floor at the 2015 SEA Games
- Venue: Bishan Sports Hall
- Date: 9 June 2015
- Competitors: 8 from 5 nations

Medalists
gold medal	Reyland Cappelan	Philippines
silver medal	Hoe Wah Toon	Singapore
bronze medal	Phạm Phước Hưng	Vietnam

The men's floor competition at the 2015 SEA Games was held on 9 June 2015 at the Bishan Sports Hall in Singapore.

== Schedule ==
All times are Singapore Standard Time (UTC+8).

Date	Time	Event
Tuesday, 9 June 2015	14:00	Final

== Qualification ==
Qualification took place on 6 June 2015 as part of the team and individual qualification event.

== Results ==
Source: Results - Men's floor

Pos.	Gymnast	D Score	E Score	Penalty	Total
1st place, gold medalist(s)	Reyland Cappelan (PHI)	6.500	8.233		14.733
2nd place, silver medalist(s)	Hoe Wah Toon (SIN)	5.900	8.666		14.566
3rd place, bronze medalist(s)	Phạm Phước Hưng (VIE)	6.000	8.500		14.500
4	Lê Thanh Tùng (VIE)	6.100	8.333		14.433
5	Ferrous One Willyodac (INA)	6.200	8.000		14.200
5	Jamorn Prommanee (THA)	5.400	8.800		14.200
7	Terry Tay (SIN)	5.800	8.233	0.300	13.733
8	Rafael Iii Ablaza (PHI)	4.700	8.700		13.400
