= Gymnastics at the 2015 SEA Games – Men's parallel bars =

Gymnastics – Men's parallel bars at the 2015 SEA Games
- Venue: Bishan Sports Hall
- Date: 10 June 2015
- Competitors: 8 from 5 nations

Medalists
gold medal	Đinh Phương Thành	Vietnam
silver medal	Rartchawat Kaewpanya	Thailand
bronze medal	Phạm Phước Hưng	Vietnam

The Men's parallel bars competition at the 2015 SEA Games was held on 10 June 2015 at the Bishan Sports Hall in Singapore.

== Schedule ==
All times are Singapore Standard Time (UTC+8).

Date	Time	Event
Saturday, 6 June 2015	09:00	Qualification
Wednesday, 10 June 2015	14:35	Final

== Qualification ==
Qualification took place on 6 June 2015 as part of the team and individual qualification event.

== Results ==
Source: Results - Men's parallel bars

Pos.	Gymnast	D Score	E Score	Penalty	Total
1st place, gold medalist(s)	Đinh Phương Thành (VIE)	6.700	9.133		15.833
2nd place, silver medalist(s)	Rartchawat Kaewpanya (THA)	6.300	8.500		14.800
3rd place, bronze medalist(s)	Phạm Phước Hưng (VIE)	7.100	7.533		14.633
4	Jamorn Prommanee (THA)	5.900	8.500		14.400
5	Muhammad Try Saputra (INA)	5.700	8.433		14.133
6	Timothy Tay (SIN)	4.700	8.733		13.433
7	Gregory Gan (SIN)	4.200	9.066		13.266
8	Jeremiah Loo Phay Xing (MAS)	4.700	7.700		12.400
