= Gymnastics at the 2015 SEA Games – Men's rings =

Gymnastics competition event

Gymnastics – Men's rings at the 2015 SEA Games
- Venue: Bishan Sports Hall
- Date: 9 June 2015
- Competitors: 8 from 4 nations

Medalists
gold medal	Đặng Nam	Vietnam
silver medal	Phạm Phước Hưng	Vietnam
bronze medal	Weena Chokpaoumpai	Thailand

The men's rings competition at the 2015 SEA Games was held on 9 June 2015 at the Bishan Sports Hall in Singapore.

== Schedule ==
All times are Singapore Standard Time (UTC+8).

Date	Time	Event
Tuesday, 9 June 2015	15:20	Final

== Qualification ==
Qualification took place on 6 June 2015 as part of the team and individual qualification event.

== Results ==
Source: Results - Men's rings

Pos.	Gymnast	D Score	E Score	Penalty	Total
1st place, gold medalist(s)	Đặng Nam (VIE)	6.500	8.800		15.300
2nd place, silver medalist(s)	Phạm Phước Hưng (VIE)	6.700	7.333		14.033
3rd place, bronze medalist(s)	Weena Chokpaoumpai (THA)	5.300	7.866		13.166
4	Terry Tay (SIN)	5.000	7.966		12.966
5	Jeremiah Loo Phay Xing (MAS)	5.000	7.933		12.933
6	Aizat Muhammad Jufrie (SIN)	4.700	8.100		12.800
7	Mohd Hamzarudin Nordin (MAS)	5.100	7.633		12.733
8	Jamorn Prommanee (THA)	5.000	7.666		12.666
