= Gymnastics at the 2015 SEA Games – Women's vault =

Gymnastics – Women's vault at the 2015 SEA Games
- Venue: Bishan Sports Hall
- Date: 9 June 2015
- Competitors: 8 from 5 nations

Medalists
gold medal	Phan Thị Hà Thanh	Vietnam
silver medal	Tan Ing Yueh	Malaysia
bronze medal	Farah Ann Abdul Hadi	Malaysia

The Women's vault competition at the 2015 SEA Games was held on 9 June 2015 at the Bishan Sports Hall in Singapore.

== Schedule ==
All times are Singapore Standard Time (UTC+8).

Date	Time	Event
Sunday, 7 June 2015	13:00	Qualification
Tuesday, 9 June 2015	14:35	Final

== Qualification ==
Qualification took place on 7 June 2015 as part of the team and individual qualification event.

== Results ==
Source: Results - Women's vault

Pos.	Gymnast	Vault 1				Vault 2				Total
Pos.	Gymnast	D Score	E Score	Penalty	Vault Score	D Score	E Score	Penalty	Vault Score	Total
1st place, gold medalist(s)	Phan Thị Hà Thanh (VIE)	5.000	8.766		13.766	5.800	8.500	0.100	14.200	13.983
2nd place, silver medalist(s)	Tan Ing Yueh (MAS)	4.800	8.600		13.400	5.200	8.333		13.533	13.466
3rd place, bronze medalist(s)	Farah Ann Abdul Hadi (MAS)	5.000	8.733		13.733	4.600	8.300		12.900	13.316
4	Rifda Irfanaluthfi (INA)	4.800	8.666		13.466	5.000	7.866		12.866	13.166
5	Đỗ Thị Vân Anh (VIE)	5.000	8.666		13.666	4.000	8.500		12.500	13.083
6	Michelle Teo (SIN)	4.400	8.700		13.100	4.200	8.733		12.933	13.016
7	Kanyanat Boontoeng (THA)	5.000	8.466		13.466	4.200	8.233		12.433	12.949
8	Praewpraw Doungchan (THA)	4.800	8.033		12.833	4.200	8.600		12.800	12.816
