= Gymnastics at the 2003 SEA Games =

- Venue: Quần Ngựa Sports Palace
- Dates: 5–12 December 2003

At the 2003 SEA Games edition, Gymnastics was divided into three sub-categories: artistic gymnastics, rhythmic gymnastics, and aerobics. The artistic gymnastics was held from December 5 to December 8, the rhythmic gymnastics from December 9 to December 11, and the aerobics gymnastics on December 12. All events were held at the Quần Ngựa Sports Palace, in Hanoi, Vietnam.

== Medalist ==
=== Artistic gymnastics ===
==== Men's events ====
Event	Gold	Silver	Bronze
Team all-around	Thailand (THA); Eakaraj Chankroong; Panitan Hongthong; Rartchawat Kaewpany; Sattra Suwansa; Saran Suwansa; Thitipong Sukdee	Malaysia (MAS); Loke Yik Siang; Ng Shu Wai; Onn Kwang Tung; Ooi Wei Siang; Heng Wah Mai; Ng Shu Mun	Philippines (PHI); Ramirez Roell; Sy Bonnie Brydon Jr; Ramirez Al L Ramirez Ronnie L Ramirez Rico L Faustino Neil
Individual all-around	Ng Shu Wai; Malaysia	Sattra Suwansa; Thailand	Ramirez Roell; Philippines
Floor	Ng Shu Wai; Malaysia	Loke Yik Siang; Malaysia	Mohammad Aldilla Akbar; Indonesia
Pommel horse	Onn Kwang Tung; Malaysia	Truong Minh Sang; Vietnam; Sattra Suwansa; Thailand	
Rings	Nguyen Minh Tuan; Vietnam; Faustino Neil; Philippines		Eakaraj Chankroong; Thailand
Vault	Ramirez Roel L Philippines	Ng Shu Wai; Malaysia	Nguyen Minh Tuan; Vietnam
Parallel bars	Duong Ngoc Dam; Vietnam; Sattra Suwansa; Thailand		Sy Bonnie Brydon Jr; Philippines
Horizontal bar	Sattra Suwansa; Thailand	Ooi Wei Siang; Malaysia	Nguyễn Hà Thanh; Vietnam

==== Women's events ====
Event	Gold	Silver	Bronze
Team all-around	Vietnam (VIE); Nguyen Thuy Duong; Đỗ Thị Ngân Thương; Dao Thuy Linh; Duong Minh Hang; Phan Thị Hà Thanh; Tran Thi Phuong Tha	Singapore (SIN); Sai You Zi; Hoe Pei Shan; Lim Heem Wei; Lee Wen; Low Sanmay; Nur Atikah Nabilah	Thailand (THA); Natthakan Khanchai; Krittaporn Sawangsri; Nuttapornkunchai; Pakkinee Hmuaktanod; Maliwan Duangfoo; Tityubol Banlengkan
Individual all-around	Nurul Fatiha Abdul Hamid; Malaysia	Low Sanmay; Singapore	Đỗ Thị Ngân Thương; Vietnam
Vault	Dewi Prahara; Indonesia	Đỗ Thị Ngân Thương; Vietnam	Nuttapornkunchai; Thailand
Uneven bars	Đỗ Thị Ngân Thương; Vietnam	Afrina Suryani Siahaan; Indonesia	Espiritu Phoebe Danielle M Philippines
Balance beam	Nurul Fatiha Abdul Hamid; Malaysia	Lim Heem Wei; Singapore	Yap Yee Yin; Malaysia
Floor	Krittaporn Sawangsri; Thailand	Natthakan Khanchai; Thailand	Low Sanmay; Singapore

=== Rhythmic gymnastics ===
Event	Gold	Silver	Bronze
Team all-around	Malaysia (MAS); Foong Seow Ting; Durratun Nashihin Bt Rosli; See Hui Yee; Lim Wen Chean	Thailand (THA); Nuttaya Wangwongsak; Ploychompu Phayonru; Sarochinee Sawakchi; Tharatip Sridee	Indonesia (INA); Yuliyanti; Cici Mitasari; Natalia; Yanti Yoseva Siahaan
Individual all-around	Durratun Nashihin Bt Rosli; Malaysia	Foong Seow Ting; Malaysia	Tharatip Sridee; Thailand
Hoop	Durratun Nashihin Bt Rosli; Malaysia	Tharatip Sridee; Thailand	See Hui Yee; Malaysia
Ball	Tharatip Sridee; Thailand	Durratun Nashihin Bt Rosli; Malaysia	Foong Seow Ting; Malaysia
Clubs	Durratun Nashihin Bt Rosli; Malaysia	Lim Wen Chean; Malaysia	Tharatip Sridee; Thailand; Ho Tanh Tu; Vietnam
Ribbon	Tharatip Sridee; Thailand	Lim Wen Chean; Malaysia	Durratun Nashihin Bt Rosli; Malaysia

=== Aerobics gymnastics ===
Event	Gold	Silver	Bronze
Single Men	Lody; Indonesia	Nguyen Thanh Huy; Vietnam	Tran Minh Khoi; Vietnam
Single Women	Trinh Hong Thanh; Vietnam	Mai Bich Lam; Vietnam	Inggrid Widyati T Indonesia
Mixed Doubles	Vietnam (VIE); Nguyen Tan Thanh; Nguyen Thi Thanh Hien	Indonesia (INA); Tyana Dewi Koesumawati; Fahmy Fachrezzy	Philippines (PHI); Roy Jill Anne E Peralta Brian S
Trios	Vietnam (VIE); Thai Anh Tuan; Nguyen Tan Thanh; Khuu Tan Phat	Thailand (THA); Torchat Pinthong; Wanchai Kanjanapimine; Nattawut Pimpa	Indonesia (INA); Lody; Abdullah Maad; Fahmy Fachrezzy

== Results ==
=== Artistic gymnastics ===
==== Men's events ====
===== Team all-around =====
December 5

Gymnast	Floor Exercise		Pommel Horse		Rings		Vault		Parallel Bars		Horizontal Bar		Total (All-around)	
Gymnast	Score	Rank	Score	Rank	Score	Rank	Score	Rank	Score	Rank	Score	Rank	Score	Rank
Thailand (THA)	34.950	1	35.500	1	35.800	2	35.250	3	34.700	1	34.450	2	210.650	1st place, gold medalist(s)
Sattra Suwansa (THA)	8.700	6	9.250	1	8.700	9	8.950	7	8.800	2	8.700	5	53.100	2
Eakaraj Chankroong (THA)	8.650	11	8.900	4	9.400	4	8.300	22	8.050	14	8.450	11	51.750	4
Panitan Hongthong (THA)	8.700	5	7.450	18	9.100	6	8.800	12	8.700	7	8.550	8	51.300	6
Saran Suwansa (THA)	8.700	7	8.750	7	8.000	16	8.700	15	8.750	5	8.300	12	51.200	8
Rartchawat Kaewpany (THA)	8.850	3					8.800	12	8.450	8	8.750	4	34.850	18
Thitipong Sukdee (THA)			8.600	9	8.600	10							17.200	29
Malaysia (MAS)	34.250	2	34.800	2	36.200	1	36.250	1	33.300	2	34.900	1	209.700	2nd place, silver medalist(s)
Ng Shu Wai (MAS)	9.200	1	8.650	8	9.450	3	9.300	1	8.750	3	9.050	1	54.400	1
Loke Yik Siang (MAS)	8.650	10	9.100	3	9.100	7	9.100	4	8.050	15	8.250	14	52.250	3
Ooi Wei Siang (MAS)	7.950	23	7.850	14	8.300	12	9.100	4	8.200	11	8.950	2	50.350	9
Ng Shu Mun (MAS)	8.100	22	7.250	19			8.750	12	8.300	10	8.250	15	40.650	15
Onn Kwang Tung (MAS)			9.200	2	8.100	15					8.650	7	25.950	22
Heng Wah Mai (MAS)	8.300	18			9.350	5	0.000	26	7.700	19			25.350	23
Philippines (PHI)	33.650	4	30.800	4	34.250	3	35.800	2	32.150	3	33.800	3	200.450	3rd place, bronze medalist(s)
Ramirez Roell (PHI)	8.700	8	8.800	6	8.150	14	9.100	4	8.100	13	8.650	6	51.500	5
Faustino Neil (PHI)	8.400	15	7.700	16	9.500	2	9.250	2	7.900	16	8.500	10	51.250	7
Sy Bonnie Brydon Jr (PHI)	8.250	19	6.800	20	8.400	11	8.800	11	8.700	6	8.550	9	49.500	10
Ramirez Al L (PHI)	8.150	21	7.500	17	8.200	13	8.450	20	7.450	20	7.350	20	47.100	12
Ramirez Ronnie L (PHI)	8.300	16			7.150	19	8.650	17	7.200	22	8.100	16	39.400	17
Ramirez Rico L (PHI)			6.500	21									6.500	33
Indonesia (INA)	34.200	3	32.400	3	30.600	4	34.750	4	31.400	4	30.300	4	193.650	4
Endriadi (INA)	8.750	4	8.050	12	7.450	17	8.700	15	7.900	17	6.700	21	47.550	11
Restu Wahyudi (INA)	8.200	20	7.800	15	6.750	21	8.600	18	7.400	21	7.850	17	46.600	13
Jonathan Mangiring (INA)	8.600	12	8.550	10	8.850	8			8.400	9	8.250	13	42.650	14
Mohammad Aldilla Akbar (INA)	8.650	9	8.000	13	7.000	20	8.500	19			7.500	19	39.650	16
Helmy Firmansyah (INA)	7.800	24			7.300	18	8.950	7	7.700	18			31.750	19
Individuals
Ouk Van Dan (CAM)	5.750	27	3.800	22	4.400	22	7.300	25	3.900	23	3.950	22	29.100	20
Nguyễn Hà Thanh (VIE)	8.450	14							9.050	1	8.850	3	26.350	21
Phạm Phước Hưng (VIE)	9.150	2							8.100	12	7.500	18	24.750	24
Nguyen Minh Tuan (VIE)					9.600	1	8.850	10					18.450	25
Duong Ngoc Dam (VIE)							9.200	3	8.750	4			17.950	26
Truong Minh Sang (VIE)			8.900	5			8.400	21					17.300	27
Thura Ko Ko (MYA)	8.300	17					8.950	7					17.250	28
Vo Dinh Vinh (VIE)	8.500	13	8.500	11									17.000	30
Aung Kyaw Swa Hein (MYA)	7.650	25					8.050	23					15.700	31
Min Min Thu (MYA)	7.450	26					7.650	24					15.100	32

===== Individual all-around =====
December 6

Rank	Athlete	Floor (gymnastics)	Pommel horse	Rings (gymnastics)	Vault (gymnastics)	Parallel bars	Horizontal bar	Total
1st place, gold medalist(s)	Ng Shu Wai (MAS)	9.350	9.050	9.325	9.300	8.500	8.200	53.725
2nd place, silver medalist(s)	Sattra Suwansa (THA)	8.700	8.975	8.525	8.887	8.325	8.875	52.287
3rd place, bronze medalist(s)	Ramirez Roell (PHI)	9.050	8.650	7.525	9.350	8.100	8.700	51.375
4	Faustino Neil (PHI)	8.225	8.050	9.225	9.200	8.150	8.350	51.200
5	Loke Yik Siang (MAS)	8.500	8.675	9.000	9.075	7.950	8.000	51.200
6	Eakaraj Chankroong (THA)	8.500	8.600	9.125	8.950	7.800	8.000	50.975
7	Restu Wahyudi (INA)	8.300	6.175	7.150	8.700	7.525	7.800	45.650

===== Floor =====
December 8

Rank	Gymnast	Start Value	B1	B2	B3	B4	B5	B6	Penalty	Total
Gold medal	Ng Shu Wai (MAS)	9.90	9.25	9.20	9.25	9.20	9.15	9.15	0.20	9.000
Silver medal	Loke Yik Siang (MAS)	9.90	9.00	8.90	8.80	8.80	8.90	9.10	0.10	8.800
Bronze medal	Mohammad Aldilla Akbar (INA)	9.80	8.75	8.90	8.80	9.00	8.70	8.70	—	8.787
4	Panitan Hongthong (THA)	9.60	8.75	8.90	8.90	8.75	8.75	8.70	—	8.787
5	Ramirez Roel L (PHI)	9.80	8.75	8.50	8.40	8.50	8.25	8.70	—	8.525
6	Phạm Phước Hưng (VIE)	9.50	8.30	8.30	8.30	8.50	8.60	8.20	0.10	8.250
7	Endriadi (INA)	9.60	8.10	8.20	8.20	7.80	7.95	7.80	—	8.012
8	Rartchawat Kaewpany (THA)	9.10	7.70	7.70	7.80	7.80	7.75	7.60	0.10	7.637

===== Pommel horse =====
December 8

Rank	Gymnast	Start Value	B1	B2	B3	B4	B5	B6	Penalty	Total
Gold medal	Onn Kwang Tung (MAS)	10.00	9.00	9.10	9.25	9.45	9.40	9.45	—	9.300
Silver medal	Truong Minh Sang (VIE)	10.00	9.40	9.00	9.30	9.00	9.30	9.40	—	9.250
Silver medal	Sattra Suwansa (THA)	9.90	9.10	9.50	9.50	9.20	9.10	9.20	—	9.250
4	Ramirez Roel L (PHI)	9.70	8.70	8.70	9.15	8.70	9.10	9.00	—	8.875
5	Eakaraj Chankroong (THA)	9.60	8.70	8.80	8.80	8.70	8.60	8.80	—	8.750
6	Jonathan Mangiring (INA)	9.40	8.30	8.50	8.40	8.60	8.80	8.75	—	8.562
7	Loke Yik Siang (MAS)	9.40	8.20	8.50	8.30	8.70	8.50	8.60	—	8.475
8	Vo Dinh Vinh (VIE)	9.40	7.80	7.70	7.70	7.50	7.60	7.60	—	7.650

===== Rings =====
December 8

Rank	Gymnast	Start Value	B1	B2	B3	B4	B5	B6	Penalty	Total
Gold medal	Nguyen Minh Tuan (VIE)	10.00	9.40	9.10	9.40	9.45	9.40	9.50	—	9.412
Gold medal	Faustino Neil (PHI)	10.00	9.50	9.50	9.45	9.35	9.35	9.30	—	9.412
Bronze medal	Eakaraj Chankroong (THA)	10.00	9.40	9.40	9.35	9.30	9.35	9.20	—	9.350
4	Ng Shu Wai (MAS)	10.00	9.20	9.20	9.45	9.40	9.35	9.40	—	9.337
5	Heng Wah Mai (MAS)	10.00	9.10	9.10	9.10	9.30	9.25	9.20	—	9.162
6	Panitan Hongthong (THA)	9.70	8.80	8.70	8.70	9.00	8.55	8.80	—	8.750
7	Jonathan Mangiring (INA)	9.30	8.30	8.30	8.60	8.10	8.35	8.40	—	8.337
8	Sy Bonnie Brydon Jr (PHI)	8.90	7.90	8.10	8.10	8.20	8.00	7.90	—	8.025

===== Vault =====
Qualification

December 5

Rank	Athlete	Vault 1	Vault 2	Total	Notes
1	Ng Shu Wai (MAS)	9.300	9.300	9.300	Q
2	Ooi Wei Siang (MAS)	9.100	9.200	9.150	Q
3	Ramirez Roell (PHI)	9.100	9.050	9.075	Q
4	Loke Yik Siang (MAS)	9.100	9.050	9.075	
5	Duong Ngoc Dam (VIE)	9.200	8.950	9.075	Q
6	Nguyen Minh Tuan (VIE)	8.850	9.050	8.950	Q
7	Endriadi (INA)	8.700	9.100	8.900	Q
8	Helmy Firmansyah (INA)	8.950	8.800	8.875	Q
9	Thura Ko Ko (MYA)	8.950	8.700	8.825	Q
10	Ramirez Ronnie L (PHI)	8.650	8.700	8.675	
11	Aung Kyaw Swa Hein (MYA)	8.050	8.250	8.150	
12	Ouk Van Dan (CAM)	7.300	7.300	7.300	
13	Heng Wah Mai (MAS)	0.000	8.600	4.300	

Final

December 8

Rank	Gymnast	#	Start Value	B1	B2	B3	B4	B5	B6	Penalty	Average	Total
Gold medal	Ramirez Roel L (PHI)	1	9.70	9.40	9.40	9.20	9.40	9.05	9.40	—	9.350	9.262
Gold medal	Ramirez Roel L (PHI)	2	9.70	9.10	9.10	9.20	9.40	8.95	9.30	—	9.175	9.262
Silver medal	Ng Shu Wai (MAS)	1	9.80	9.60	9.50	9.30	9.50	9.40	9.50	—	9.475	9.237
Silver medal	Ng Shu Wai (MAS)	2	9.70	9.20	9.00	9.00	9.00	8.85	9.00	—	9.000	9.237
Bronze medal	Nguyen Minh Tuan (VIE)	1	9.80	8.90	8.80	8.80	8.80	9.00	9.10	—	8.875	9.100
Bronze medal	Nguyen Minh Tuan (VIE)	2	9.90	9.30	9.20	9.20	9.40	9.50	9.40	—	9.325	9.100
4	Endriadi (INA)	1	9.80	8.80	9.10	8.80	8.90	8.70	9.10	—	8.900	9.062
4	Endriadi (INA)	2	9.70	9.20	9.30	9.20	9.20	8.90	9.30	—	9.225	9.062
5	Ooi Wei Siang (MAS)	1	9.70	9.20	9.10	8.80	9.10	8.85	9.10	—	9.037	9.031
5	Ooi Wei Siang (MAS)	2	9.60	9.00	9.00	9.00	9.15	8.90	9.10	—	9.025	9.031
6	Helmy Firmansyah (INA)	1	10.00	9.10	9.30	9.10	9.00	8.90	9.30	—	9.125	8.987
6	Helmy Firmansyah (INA)	2	9.80	8.70	8.90	8.90	8.80	8.80	8.90	—	8.850	8.987
7	Thura Ko Ko (MYA)	1	9.70	9.00	8.90	8.90	9.00	8.95	9.10	—	8.962	8.631
7	Thura Ko Ko (MYA)	2	9.60	8.20	8.30	8.30	8.60	8.15	8.40	—	8.300	8.631
8	Duong Ngoc Dam (VIE)	1	9.70	8.70	8.70	8.40	8.70	8.65	9.00	—	8.687	4.343
8	Duong Ngoc Dam (VIE)	2	0.00	0.00	0.00	0.00	0.00	0.00	0.00	—	0.000	4.343

===== Parallel bars =====
December 8

Rank	Gymnast	Start Value	B1	B2	B3	B4	B5	B6	Penalty	Total
Gold medal	Duong Ngoc Dam (VIE)	9.80	9.20	8.70	8.90	8.80	9.00	8.70	—	8.850
Gold medal	Sattra Suwansa (THA)	9.30	8.80	9.00	8.80	8.90	8.70	8.90	—	8.850
Bronze medal	Sy Bonnie Brydon Jr (PHI)	9.40	8.70	8.60	9.00	8.70	8.90	8.80	—	8.775
4	Saran Suwansa (THA)	9.30	8.40	8.60	8.30	8.20	8.40	8.70	—	8.425
5	Nguyễn Hà Thanh (VIE)	9.50	8.40	8.30	8.30	8.40	8.40	7.90	—	8.350
6	Ng Shu Wai (MAS)	9.00	8.20	8.10	8.20	8.60	8.30	8.40	—	8.275
7	Ng Shu Mun (MAS)	9.30	7.80	7.70	7.70	8.20	8.00	7.50	—	7.800
8	Ramirez Roel L (PHI)	0.00	0.00	0.00	0.00	0.00	0.00	0.00	—	0.000

===== Horizontal bar =====
December 8

Rank	Gymnast	Start Value	B1	B2	B3	B4	B5	B6	Penalty	Total
Gold medal	Sattra Suwansa (THA)	9.50	9.10	9.20	8.85	8.80	8.90	9.00	—	8.962
Silver medal	Ooi Wei Siang (MAS)	9.80	8.90	8.70	8.90	8.80	9.10	8.70	—	8.825
Bronze medal	Nguyễn Hà Thanh (VIE)	9.40	8.70	8.70	8.70	8.70	8.70	8.90	—	8.700
4	Ng Shu Wai (MAS)	9.60	8.50	8.60	8.30	8.40	8.80	8.70	—	8.550
5	Ramirez Roel L (PHI)	9.40	8.50	8.20	8.50	8.50	8.50	8.10	—	8.425
6	Sy Bonnie Brydon Jr (PHI)	9.50	8.40	8.20	8.20	8.50	8.00	8.20	—	8.250
7	Rartchawat Kaewpany (THA)	9.00	7.80	7.80	7.80	7.80	7.90	8.00	—	7.825
8	Restu Wahyudi (INA)	8.80	7.50	7.40	7.20	7.30	7.20	7.60	—	7.350

==== Women's events ====
===== Team all-around =====
December 5

Gymnast	Vault		Uneven Bars		Balance Beam		Floor Exercise		Total (All-around)	
Gymnast	Score	Rank	Score	Rank	Score	Rank	Score	Rank	Score	Rank
Vietnam (VIE)	33.925	1	31.900	1	27.825	3	30.900	1	124.550	1st place, gold medalist(s)
Do Thi Ngan Thuong (VIE)	8.725	3	8.400	1	7.200	8	7.100	21	31.425	3
Duong Minh Hang (VIE)	8.275	14	7.675	12	7.075	13	7.825	6	30.850	8
Dao Thuy Linh (VIE)	8.225	15	7.800	8	6.600	23	7.950	5	30.575	10
Phan Thị Hà Thanh (VIE)	7.775	28	7.400	17	6.700	20	8.025	3	29.900	14
Tran Thi Phuong Tha (VIE)	8.700	4			6.850	18			15.550	29
Nguyen Thuy Duong (VIE)			8.025	4			7.100	22	15.125	30
Singapore (SIN)	33.500	4	30.500	3	29.625	1	30.800	2	124.425	2nd place, silver medalist(s)
Low Sanmay (SIN)	8.775	2	8.000	5	7.775	1	8.200	1	32.750	1
Lim Heem Wei (SIN)	8.500	11	7.750	9	7.350	5	7.700	9	31.300	6
Lee Wen (SIN)	8.150	19	7.300	19	7.150	10	7.600	11	30.200	12
Sai You Zi (SIN)	8.075	24	7.300	18	7.350	7	7.300	17	30.025	13
Nur Atikah Nabilah (SIN)	8.000	26	7.450	16	7.050	14	7.300	18	29.800	15
Hoe Pei Shan (SIN)										
Thailand (THA)	33.750	3	31.025	2	28.575	2	30.500	3	123.850	3rd place, bronze medalist(s)
Natthakan Khanchai (THA)	8.500	11	7.975	6	7.175	9	7.775	8	31.425	4
Krittaporn Sawangsri (THA)	7.950	27	7.650	14	7.400	4	7.800	7	30.800	9
Nuttapornkunchai (THA)	8.600	8	7.675	13	7.100	12	6.950	24	30.325	11
Pakkinee Hmuaktanod (THA)	8.600	8	6.450	25	6.900	17	7.650	10	29.600	18
Maliwan Duangfoo (THA)	8.050	25			6.350	25	7.275	19	21.675	25
Tityubol Banlengkan (THA)			7.725	10					7.725	33
Philippines (PHI)	32.800	5	29.875	4	27.700	4	28.175	5	118.550	4
Santos Emille Chris (PHI)	8.300	13	7.050	21	7.100	11	7.325	15	29.775	16
Espiritu Phoebe Danielle M (PHI)	8.175	18	8.050	3	5.825	28	7.150	20	29.200	19
Paraso Patricia Kat (PHI)	8.200	16	6.900	22	7.025	15	6.250	29	28.375	21
Saguisag Ma Kristin (PHI)	8.100	23			6.975	16	6.925	25	22.000	24
Gadia Anna Katerina (PHI)	8.125	21	6.250	26			6.775	27	21.150	26
De Guzman Cintamoni (PHI)			7.875	7	6.600	22			14.475	31
Indonesia (INA)	33.850	2	27.250	5	26.000	5	28.725	4	115.825	5
Dewi Prahara (INA)	8.825	1	6.550	24	7.350	6	7.000	23	29.725	17
Sukma Anggraini (INA)	8.700	7	6.700	23	5.925	27	7.300	16	28.625	20
Riri Wulandari Adel (INA)	8.125	21	5.850	27	6.175	26	6.550	28	26.700	22
Afrina Suryani Siahaan (INA)			8.150	2	5.000	29	7.500	12	20.650	27
Neta Hundri Dona (INA)	8.200	16	5.350	28			6.925	26	20.475	28
Yossy Pramitha (INA)	7.725	29			6.550	24			14.275	32
Individuals
Nurul Fatiha Abdul Hamid (MAS)	8.600	8	7.250	20	7.750	2	8.075	2	31.675	2
Yap Yee Yin (MAS)	8.700	4	7.600	15	7.750	3	7.350	14	31.400	5
Chang Zhi Wei (MAS)	8.700	6	7.700	11	6.650	21	8.000	4	31.050	7
Htar Htet Htet (MYA)	8.150	19			6.850	19	7.450	13	22.450	23
Phu Myint Myat Bo (MYA)							5.150	30	5.150	34

===== Individual all-around =====
December 6

Rank	Athlete	Vault (gymnastics)	Uneven bars	Balance beam	Floor (gymnastics)	Total
1st place, gold medalist(s)	Nurul Fatiha Abdul Hamid (MAS)	8.700	8.387	8.075	8.075	33.237
2nd place, silver medalist(s)	Low Sanmay (SIN)	8.600	7.237	8.412	7.987	32.236
3rd place, bronze medalist(s)	Do Thi Ngan Thuong (VIE)	8.837	8.137	7.075	7.837	31.886
4	Santos Emille Chris (PHI)	8.425	7.425	8.100	7.837	31.787
5	Krittaporn Sawangsri (THA)	8.450	7.462	7.750	7.887	31.549
6	Natthakan Khanchai (THA)	8.362	7.450	7.700	7.900	31.412
7	Yap Yee Yin (MAS)	8.562	7.462	7.337	7.862	31.223
8	Espiritu Phoebe Danielle M (PHI)	8.175	8.000	6.950	8.025	31.150
9	Lim Heem Wei (SIN)	8.387	7.450	7.575	7.687	31.099
10	Duong Minh Hang (VIE)	8.300	7.262	6.762	7.662	29.986
11	Dewi Prahara (INA)	8.775	6.525	7.225	7.400	29.925
12	Sukma Anggraini (INA)	0.000	0.000	0.000	0.000	0.000

===== Vault =====
Qualification

December 5

Rank	Athlete	Vault 1	Vault 2	Total	Notes
1	Low Sanmay (SIN)	8.775	8.500	8.637	Q
2	Yap Yee Yin (MAS)	8.700	8.300	8.500	Q
3	Natthakan Khanchai (THA)	8.500	8.450	8.475	
4	Nurul Fatiha Abdul Hamid (MAS)	8.600	8.275	8.437	Q
5	Nuttapornkunchai (THA)	8.600	8.250	8.425	Q
6	Pakkinee Hmuaktanod (THA)	8.600	8.225	8.412	Q
7	Tran Thi Phuong Tha (VIE)	8.700	8.125	8.412	Q
8	Dewi Prahara (INA)	8.825	7.950	8.387	Q
9	Chang Zhi Wei (MAS)	8.700	7.950	8.325	
10	Do Thi Ngan Thuong (VIE)	8.725	7.800	8.262	Q
11	Sukma Anggraini (INA)	8.700	7.825	8.262	
12	Espiritu Phoebe Danielle M (PHI)	8.175	8.250	8.212	
13	Htar Htet Htet (MYA)	8.150	8.050	8.100	
14	Riri Wulandari Adel (INA)	8.125	8.025	8.075	
15	Krittaporn Sawangsri (THA)	7.950	7.850	7.900	

Final

December 8

Rank	Gymnast	#	Start Value	B1	B2	B3	B4	B5	B6	Penalty	Average	Total
Gold medal	Dewi Prahara (INA)	1	9.40	8.85	8.75	8.50	8.30	8.60	8.70	—	8.637	8.431
Gold medal	Dewi Prahara (INA)	2	9.10	8.25	8.15	8.30	8.10	8.50	8.20	—	8.225	8.431
Silver medal	Do Thi Ngan Thuong (VIE)	1	9.40	8.70	8.75	8.70	8.20	8.60	8.65	—	8.662	8.424
Silver medal	Do Thi Ngan Thuong (VIE)	2	9.00	8.00	8.30	8.50	8.00	8.30	8.15	—	8.187	8.424
Bronze medal	Nuttapornkunchai (THA)	1	9.40	8.70	8.45	8.40	8.40	8.40	8.45	—	8.425	8.362
Bronze medal	Nuttapornkunchai (THA)	2	9.10	8.40	8.20	8.20	7.70	8.40	8.40	—	8.300	8.362
4	Yap Yee Yin (MAS)	1	9.60	8.55	8.60	8.60	8.70	8.70	8.60	—	8.625	8.356
4	Yap Yee Yin (MAS)	2	9.10	8.15	8.00	8.10	8.50	8.10	7.90	—	8.087	8.356
5	Low Sanmay (SIN)	1	9.40	8.80	8.60	8.40	8.20	8.40	8.40	—	8.450	8.350
5	Low Sanmay (SIN)	2	9.10	8.60	8.25	8.30	7.90	8.20	8.25	—	8.250	8.350
6	Pakkinee Hmuaktanod (THA)	1	9.40	8.20	8.20	8.10	7.90	8.20	8.50	—	8.175	8.337
6	Pakkinee Hmuaktanod (THA)	2	9.50	8.60	8.50	8.30	8.20	8.60	8.60	—	8.500	8.337
7	Nurul Fatiha Abdul Hamid (MAS)	1	9.40	8.40	8.20	8.20	8.60	8.40	8.40	—	8.350	7.862
7	Nurul Fatiha Abdul Hamid (MAS)	2	9.00	7.30	7.20	7.50	7.50	7.30	7.40	—	7.375	7.862
8	Tran Thi Phuong Tha (VIE)	1	9.40	8.20	8.20	8.00	7.70	8.10	8.05	—	8.087	7.774
8	Tran Thi Phuong Tha (VIE)	2	9.00	7.30	7.65	7.50	7.20	7.50	7.55	—	7.462	7.774

===== Uneven bars =====
December 8

Rank	Gymnast	Start Value	B1	B2	B3	B4	B5	B6	Penalty	Total
Gold medal	Do Thi Ngan Thuong (VIE)	9.10	8.30	8.35	7.95	8.60	8.35	8.50	—	8.375
Silver medal	Afrina Suryani Siahaan (INA)	9.00	7.90	8.10	8.00	8.20	8.00	7.80	—	8.000
Bronze medal	Espiritu Phoebe Danielle M (PHI)	9.00	7.50	7.60	7.55	8.10	7.65	7.30	—	7.575
4	Low Sanmay (SIN)	8.70	7.20	7.40	7.40	7.40	7.65	7.80	—	7.462
5	De Guzman Cintamoni (PHI)	9.10	7.10	7.10	7.00	7.30	7.15	7.20	—	7.137
6	Tityubol Banlengkan (THA)	8.80	7.10	6.60	7.00	6.80	7.50	6.90	—	6.950
7	Lim Heem Wei (SIN)	8.70	6.90	6.85	6.60	6.50	7.05	7.00	—	6.837
8	Nguyen Thuy Duong (VIE)	8.40	6.50	6.65	6.40	6.90	6.55	6.40	—	6.525

===== Balance beam =====
December 8

Rank	Gymnast	Start Value	B1	B2	B3	B4	B5	B6	Penalty	Total
Gold medal	Nurul Fatiha Abdul Hamid (MAS)	8.90	8.05	8.00	8.00	8.20	8.10	7.50	—	8.037
Silver medal	Lim Heem Wei (SIN)	8.70	7.55	7.85	7.70	7.85	8.00	7.05	—	7.737
Bronze medal	Yap Yee Yin (MAS)	8.80	7.60	7.60	7.65	7.70	7.80	7.40	—	7.637
4	Low Sanmay (SIN)	9.20	7.50	7.65	7.45	7.70	7.60	7.10	—	7.550
5	Natthakan Khanchai (THA)	9.00	7.30	7.30	7.85	7.40	7.20	7.25	—	7.312
6	Dewi Prahara (INA)	8.80	7.25	7.00	7.05	7.80	7.30	6.40	—	7.150
7	Krittaporn Sawangsri (THA)	8.90	6.60	6.60	6.55	6.70	6.80	6.10	—	6.612
8	Do Thi Nganthuong (VIE)	8.30	6.40	6.65	6.50	6.60	6.60	6.00	—	6.525

===== Floor =====
December 8

Rank	Gymnast	Start Value	B1	B2	B3	B4	B5	B6	Penalty	Total
Gold medal	Krittaporn Sawangsri (THA)	9.30	8.30	8.60	7.80	8.25	8.30	7.90	—	8.187
Silver medal	Natthakan Khanchai (THA)	9.40	8.10	8.30	8.15	8.10	8.00	7.90	—	8.087
Bronze medal	Low Sanmay (SIN)	9.30	8.10	7.90	7.90	8.35	8.20	8.00	—	8.050
4	Phan Thị Hà Thanh (VIE)	9.20	7.65	7.70	7.70	7.60	7.60	8.20	—	7.662
5	Dao Thuy Linh (VIE)	8.80	7.55	7.50	7.60	7.45	7.60	7.80	—	7.562
6	Chang Zhi Wei (MAS)	9.10	7.60	7.50	8.00	7.65	7.10	7.50	—	7.562
7	Nurul Fatiha Abdul Hamid (MAS)	9.00	7.45	7.20	8.00	7.55	7.40	7.60	—	7.500
8	Lim Heem Wei (SIN)	8.70	7.35	7.20	7.30	7.60	7.40	7.20	—	7.312

=== Rhythmic gymnastics ===
==== Women's events ====
===== Team all-around =====
9 December

Team competition is only for countries with at least 3 participating/entries of gymnasts. Only gymnasts competing in at least 3 apparatus can compete for the all-around qualifications; with the top three highest scores counted. Team competition also served as qualification for the event finals. Three gymnasts per team compete on each event, and the best ten of the scores out of twelve scores count.

Gymnast	Hoop		Ball		Clubs		Ribbon		Total (All-around)	
Gymnast	Score	Rank	Score	Rank	Score	Rank	Score	Rank	Score	Rank
Malaysia (MAS)	62.450		43.050		60.600		39.650		205.750	1st place, gold medalist(s)
Durratun Nashihin Bt Rosli (MAS)	21.850	1	21.600	2	20.550	1	19.800	3	64.000	1
Foong Seow Ting (MAS)	20.200	4	21.450	3	20.000	3	19.800	2	61.650	3
Lim Wen Chean (MAS)			19.350	5	20.050	2	19.850	1	59.250	4
See Hui Yee (MAS)	20.400	3							20.400	17
Thailand (THA)	58.050		60.025		55.525		19.350		192.950	2nd place, silver medalist(s)
Tharatip Sridee (THA)	20.900	2	22.000	1	19.600	4	19.350	4	62.500	2
Ploychompu Phayonru (THA)	18.700	5	20.225	4	17.475	7	17.350	5	56.400	5
Sarochinee Sawakchi (THA)	18.450	6			18.450	5	16.125	6	53.025	6
Nuttaya Wangwongsak (THA)			17.800	7					17.800	18
Indonesia (INA)	46.450		44.875		47.025		15.150		153.500	3rd place, bronze medalist(s)
Yuliyanti (INA)	17.075	7	17.850	6	17.525	6	15.150	7	52.450	7
Cici Mitasari (INA)	14.475	13	13.875	11	15.050	9	12.175	12	43.400	11
Yanti Yoseva Siahaan (INA)	14.900	12	13.150	12	14.450	12	12.050	13	42.500	12
Vietnam (VIE)	47.300		31.200		44.400		27.250		150.150	4
Ho Thanh Tu (VIE)	16.200	8	15.350	9	15.950	8	14.150	8	47.500	8
Nguyen Thu Ha (VIE)	15.700	9	15.850	8	14.800	10	12.900	11	46.350	9
Pham Ngoc Thu (VIE)	15.400	10	12.750	13	13.650	13	13.100	10	42.150	13
Philippines (PHI)	27.950		26.425		25.625		25.250		105.250	5
Basco Ma Angelica T (PHI)	15.250	11	15.200	10	14.725	11	13.750	9	45.175	10
Mamoro Maria Carla (PHI)	12.700	14	11.225	14	10.900	14	11.500	14	35.425	14
Ty Maria Geneveve D (PHI)	0.000	17	0.000	16	0.000	17	0.000	16	0.000	19
Individuals
Bounnady Phonesuda (LAO)	10.025	15	9.400	15	9.800	15			29.225	15
Vongphakdy Ketsuda (LAO)	9.250	16			9.300	16	8.150	15	26.700	16

===== Individual all-around =====
10 December

Rank	Athlete	Hoop (rhythmic gymnastics)	Ball (rhythmic gymnastics)	Clubs (rhythmic gymnastics)	Ribbon (rhythmic gymnastics)	Total
1st place, gold medalist(s)	Durratun Nashihin Bt Rosli (MAS)	21.150	21.850	21.350	19.850	84.200
2nd place, silver medalist(s)	Foong Seow Ting (MAS)	19.550	20.750	19.500	19.000	78.800
3rd place, bronze medalist(s)	Tharatip Sridee (THA)	18.950	20.800	20.050	18.950	78.750
4	Ploychompu Phayonru (THA)	17.850	18.700	16.300	15.750	68.600
5	Yuliyanti (INA)	14.950	16.400	15.400	15.500	62.250
6	Nguyen Thu Ha (VIE)	16.500	16.750	14.350	13.600	61.200
7	Ho Thanh Tu (VIE)	15.400	13.275	13.700	13.150	55.525
8	Basco Ma Angelica T (PHI)	14.000	14.675	13.100	13.000	54.775
9	Cici Mitasari (INA)	13.350	13.750	13.000	12.200	52.300
10	Mamoro Maria Carla (PHI)	11.050	11.800	10.900	10.000	43.750

===== Hoop =====
11 December

Rank	Gymnast	Technical Score	Artistic Score	Execution Score	Penalty	Total
Gold medal	Durratun Nashihin Bt Rosli (MAS)	4.750	6.500	8.200	—	19.450
Silver medal	Tharatip Sridee (THA)	4.850	5.950	8.100	—	18.900
Bronze medal	See Hui Yee (MAS)	4.500	5.100	7.450	—	17.050
4	Ho Thanh Tu (VIE)	4.500	4.150	8.000	—	16.650
5	Nguyen Thu Ha (VIE)	2.850	5.150	7.950	—	15.950
6	Ploychompu Phayonru (THA)	3.550	5.050	7.250	—	15.850
7	Yuliyanti (INA)	2.750	5.150	7.750	—	15.650
8	Basco Ma Angelica T (PHI)	1.200	4.250	7.450	—	12.900

===== Ball =====
11 December

Rank	Gymnast	Technical Score	Artistic Score	Execution Score	Penalty	Total
Gold medal	Tharatip Sridee (THA)	5.900	6.500	8.500	—	20.900
Silver medal	Durratun Nashihin Bt Rosli (MAS)	4.800	6.350	8.300	—	19.450
Bronze medal	Foong Seow Ting (MAS)	4.000	6.500	8.400	—	18.900
4	Nguyen Thu Ha (VIE)	4.000	5.600	8.300	—	17.900
5	Ho Thanh Tu (VIE)	4.500	4.800	8.400	—	17.700
6	Ploychompu Phayonru (THA)	4.000	5.550	8.000	0.050	17.500
7	Yuliyanti (INA)	4.100	4.850	7.550	—	16.500
8	Basco Ma Angelica T (PHI)	2.350	4.750	7.400	—	14.500

===== Clubs =====
11 December

Rank	Gymnast	Technical Score	Artistic Score	Execution Score	Penalty	Total
Gold medal	Durratun Nashihin Bt Rosli (MAS)	4.650	6.650	8.150	—	19.450
Silver medal	Lim Wen Chean (MAS)	4.050	6.350	8.000	—	18.400
Bronze medal	Tharatip Sridee (THA)	4.000	5.900	8.150	—	18.050
Bronze medal	Ho Thanh Tu (VIE)	4.050	5.900	8.100	—	18.050
5	Nguyen Thu Ha (VIE)	3.650	4.500	8.250	—	16.400
6	Sarochinee Sawakchi (THA)	3.200	5.150	7.650	—	16.000
7	Yuliyanti (INA)	2.600	4.850	7.700	0.200	14.950
8	Cici Mitasari (INA)	1.450	4.850	7.800	—	14.100

===== Ribbon =====
11 December

Rank	Gymnast	Technical Score	Artistic Score	Execution Score	Penalty	Total
Gold medal	Tharatip Sridee (THA)	5.000	5.650	8.350	—	19.000
Silver medal	Lim Wen Chean (MAS)	4.200	5.550	8.250	—	18.000
Bronze medal	Durratun Nashihin Bt Rosli (MAS)	4.100	5.800	7.850	—	17.750
4	Ploychompu Phayonru (THA)	4.300	4.600	7.400	—	16.200
5	Yuliyanti (INA)	2.650	4.550	7.700	0.100	14.800
6	Ho Thanh Tu (VIE)	2.850	3.700	7.750	—	14.300
7	Basco Ma Angelica T (PHI)	1.300	3.800	7.600	—	12.700
8	Pham Ngoc Thu (VIE)	1.000	3.300	6.900	—	11.200

=== Aerobics gymnastics ===
==== Single Men ====
12 December

Rank	Gymnast	Artistic Score	Execution Score	Difficulty Score	Difficulty Penalty	JDed	C.J	Total
Gold medal	Lody (INA)	6.30	7.00	3.35	—	—	—	16.450
Silver medal	Nguyen Than Huy (VIE)	5.50	7.10	2.35	—	—	—	14.950
Bronze medal	Tran Minh Khoi (VIE)	5.30	7.20	2.30	—	—	—	14.800
4	Torchat Pinthong (THA)	5.70	6.20	2.70	—	—	—	14.600
5	Erwin Ongso (INA)	5.70	5.40	3.00	—	—	—	14.100
6	Wanchai Kanjanapimi (THA)	5.10	6.50	2.15	—	0.10	—	13.650
7	Busman Bin Noor (MAS)	5.00	5.30	1.30	0.50	—	—	11.100
8	Peralta Liwliua Jr (PHI)	4.20	4.40	1.00	0.50	—	—	9.100
9	Freire James Fritz (PHI)	5.00	4.00	0.45	0.50	—	—	8.950

==== Single Women ====
12 December

Rank	Gymnast	Artistic Score	Execution Score	Difficulty Score	Difficulty Penalty	JDed	C.J	Total
Gold medal	Trinh Hong Thanh (VIE)	5.30	7.80	2.05	—	—	—	15.150
Silver medal	Mai Bich Lam (VIE)	5.50	7.00	2.40	—	—	—	14.900
Bronze medal	Inggrid Widyati T (INA)	5.70	6.00	3.00	—	—	—	14.700
4	Warunya Sirikunwiwa (THA)	6.00	6.50	1.55	—	—	—	14.050
5	Tyana Dewi Koesumawati (INA)	5.40	5.60	1.90	—	—	—	12.900
6	Teo Hooi Lam (MAS)	5.40	5.00	1.20	—	—	—	11.600
7	Preeyachat Pinthong (THA)	5.90	5.10	0.85	1.50	—	—	10.350
8	Pamplona Vinia S (PHI)	5.30	4.70	0.80	0.50	—	—	10.300
9	Duco Lizette L (PHI)	5.10	5.00	0.45	1.00	—	1.00	8.550

==== Mixed doubles ====
12 December

Rank	Gymnast	Artistic Score	Execution Score	Difficulty Score	Difficulty Penalty	JDed	C.J	Total
Gold medal	Vietnam (VIE); Nguyen Tan Thanh; Nguyen Thi Thanh Hien	5.60	6.30	1.45	—	—	—	13.350
Silver medal	Indonesia (INA); Tyana Dewi Koesumawati; Fahmy Fachrezzy	5.50	5.80	2.10	—	—	0.50	12.900
Bronze medal	Philippines (PHI); Roy Jill Anne E Peralta Brian S	5.60	4.90	0.45	1.00	—	—	9.950
4	Thailand (THA); Nattawut Pimpa; Suwadee Phruthichai	5.20	4.80	0.80	1.00	—	0.50	9.300

==== Trios ====
12 December

Rank	Gymnast	Artistic Score	Execution Score	Difficulty Score	Difficulty Penalty	JDed	C.J	Total
Gold medal	Vietnam (VIE); Thai Anh Tuan; Nguyen Tan Thanh; Khuu Tan Phat	5.10	7.50	1.55	—	—	—	14.150
Silver medal	Thailand (THA); Torchat Pinthong; Wanchai Kanjanapimine; Nattawut Pimpa	5.30	6.20	1.50	—	—	—	13.000
Bronze medal	Indonesia (INA); Lody; Abdullah Maad; Fahmy Fachrezzy	5.20	5.50	2.20	0.50	—	0.50	11.900
4	Philippines (PHI)	4.80	5.00	0.278	1.50	—	1.00	7.578

== Medal table ==
Legend

* Host nation (Vietnam)

Rank	Nation	Gold	Silver	Bronze	Total
1	Malaysia	9	8	4	21
2	Vietnam*	7	4	5	16
3	Thailand	6	6	5	17
4	Indonesia	2	2	4	8
5	Philippines	2	0	5	7
6	Singapore	0	3	1	4
Totals (6 entries)		26	23	24	73
