= Gymnastics at the 2015 SEA Games – Women's uneven bars =

Gymnastics – Women's uneven bars at the 2015 SEA Games
- Venue: Bishan Sports Hall
- Date: 9 June 2015
- Competitors: 8 from 5 nations

Medalists
gold medal	Tan Ing Yueh	Malaysia
silver medal	Ava Verdeflor	Philippines
bronze medal	Farah Ann Abdul Hadi	Malaysia

The Women's uneven bars competition at the 2015 SEA Games was held on 9 June 2015 at the Bishan Sports Hall in Singapore.

== Schedule ==
All times are Singapore Standard Time (UTC+8).

Date	Time	Event
Sunday, 7 June 2015	13:00	Qualification
Tuesday, 9 June 2015	15:20	Final

== Qualification ==
Qualification took place on 7 June 2015 as part of the team and individual qualification event.

== Results ==
Source: Results - Women's uneven bars

Pos.	Gymnast	D Score	E Score	Penalty	Total
1st place, gold medalist(s)	Tan Ing Yueh (MAS)	4.700	8.066		12.766
2nd place, silver medalist(s)	Ava Verdeflor (PHI)	4.700	7.666		12.366
3rd place, bronze medalist(s)	Farah Ann Abdul Hadi (MAS)	5.300	6.900		12.200
4	Ashly Lau (SIN)	4.400	7.600		12.000
5	Praewpraw Doungchan (THA)	4.200	7.300		11.500
6	Phan Thị Hà Thanh (VIE)	4.100	7.033		11.133
7	Janessa Dai (SIN)	4.600	6.433		11.033
8	Đỗ Thị Thu Huyền (VIE)	2.500	7.166		9.666
