= Gymnastics at the 2015 SEA Games – Women's artistic team =

Gymnastics – Women's artistic team at the 2015 SEA Games
- Venue: Bishan Sports Hall
- Date: 7 June 2015
- Competitors: 29 from 6 nations

Medalists
gold medal	Tracie Ang; Farah Ann Abdul Hadi; Tan Ing Yueh; Nur Eli Ellina Azmi; Siti Nur Bahirah Ahmad; Lavinia Michelle Jayadev	Malaysia
silver medal	Kelsie Muir; Michelle Teo; Ashly Lau; Janessa Dai; Nadine Nathan; Zeng Qiyan	Singapore
bronze medal	Rachelle Arellano; Ma. Cristina Onofre; Elizabeth LeDuc; Ava Lorein Verdeflor; Sofia Isabel Gonzalez	Philippines

The women's artistic team competition at the 2015 SEA Games was held on 7 June 2015 at the Bishan Sports Hall in Singapore.

The team competition also served as qualification for the individual all-around and event finals.

== Schedule ==
All times are Singapore Standard Time (UTC+8).

Date	Time	Event
Sunday, 7 June 2015	13:00	Final

== Results ==
Source: Results - Women's artistic team

Rank	Gymnast	Vault (gymnastics)	Uneven bars	Balance beam	Floor (gymnastics)	Total
1st place, gold medalist(s)	Malaysia (MAS)	53.450	49.400	50.100	53.250	206.200
	Tracie Ang	12.900	11.650	12.600	13.250	50.400
	Farah Ann Abdul Hadi	13.550	13.200	12.700	13.800	53.250
	Tan Ing Yueh	13.350	12.500	12.200	13.350	51.400
	Nur Eli Ellina Azmi			12.600	12.050	24.650
	Siti Nur Bahirah Ahmad	13.250	12.050			25.300
	Lavinia Michelle Jayadev	13.300	9.550	11.150	12.850	46.850
2nd place, silver medalist(s)	Singapore (SIN)	52.650	48.000	50.650	51.200	202.500
	Kelsie Muir	12.600			11.950	24.550
	Michelle Teo	13.100	10.900	12.450	12.300	48.750
	Ashly Lau		12.300	12.850		25.150
	Janessa Dai	13.300	12.350	12.300	12.900	50.850
	Nadine Nathan	13.650	11.800	13.050	13.200	51.700
	Zeng Qiyan	11.600	11.550	11.600	12.800	47.550
3rd place, bronze medalist(s)	Philippines (PHI)	52.100	40.850	48.600	49.850	191.400
	Rachelle Arellano	12.350	8.950	10.600	12.050	43.950
	Ma. Cristina Onofre	12.950	4.450	9.000	12.400	38.800
	Elizabeth LeDuc	13.250	10.800	13.050	12.800	49.900
	Ava Lorein Verdeflor	13.050	12.650	12.600	12.450	50.750
	Sofia Isabel Gonzalez	12.850	8.450	12.350	12.200	45.850
4	Vietnam (VIE)	52.250	41.200	49.650	48.150	191.250
	Đỗ Thị Vân Anh	13.400	10.500	12.800	12.300	49.000
	Phan Thị Hà Thanh	12.650	11.150	14.400	13.250	51.450
	Đỗ Thị Thu Huyền	13.150	11.300	11.900	12.300	48.650
	Long Thị Ngọc Huỳnh	13.050	8.250	10.550	10.300	42.150
5	Thailand (THA)	52.500	38.050	44.700	45.700	180.950
	Kotchakorn Sukhum	12.800		10.100	10.450	33.350
	Kanyarat Suphasa		8.800			8.800
	Praewpraw Doungchan	13.200	11.350	12.750	12.250	49.550
	Ritruedee Kumsiriratn	12.950	9.350	10.450	11.200	43.950
	Kanyanat Boontoeng	13.450	8.550	10.500	11.800	44.300
	Thidaporn Khanthara	12.900	8.500	11.000	10.050	42.450
Individuals
	Indonesia (INA)					
	Rifda Irfanaluthfi	13.700	10.250	13.450	13.450	50.850
	Sahirah Sahirah	12.400		10.800	11.250	34.450

== Qualification results ==
=== Individual all-around ===
Pos.	Gymnast	Vault (gymnastics)	Uneven bars	Balance beam	Floor (gymnastics)	Total	Notes
1	Farah Ann Abdul Hadi (MAS)	13.550	13.200	12.700	13.800	53.250	Q
2	Nadine Nathan (SIN)	13.650	11.800	13.050	13.200	51.700	Q
3	Phan Thị Hà Thanh (VIE)	12.650	11.150	14.400	13.250	51.450	Q
4	Tan Ing Yueh (MAS)	13.350	12.500	12.200	13.350	51.400	Q
5	Rifda Irfanaluthfi (INA)	13.700	10.250	13.450	13.450	50.850	Q
6	Janessa Dai (SIN)	13.300	12.350	12.300	12.900	50.850	Q
7	Ava Verdeflor (PHI)	13.050	12.650	12.600	12.450	50.750	Q
8	Tracie Ang (MAS)	12.900	11.650	12.600	13.250	50.400	
9	Lizzy LeDuc (PHI)	13.250	10.800	13.050	12.800	49.900	Q
10	Praewpraw Doungchan (THA)	13.200	11.350	12.750	12.250	49.550	Q
11	Đỗ Thị Vân Anh (VIE)	13.400	10.500	12.800	12.300	49.000	Q
12	Michelle Teo (SIN)	13.100	10.900	12.450	12.300	48.750	
13	Đỗ Thị Thu Huyền (VIE)	13.150	11.300	11.900	12.300	48.650	
14	Zeng Qiyan (SIN)	11.600	11.550	11.600	12.800	47.550	
15	Lavinia Michelle Jayadev (MAS)	13.300	9.550	11.150	12.950	46.850	
16	Sofia Isabel Gonzalez (PHI)	12.850	8.450	12.350	12.200	45.850	
17	Kanyanat Boontoeng (THA)	13.450	8.550	10.500	11.800	44.300	Q
18	Rachelle Arellano (PHI)	12.350	8.950	10.600	12.050	43.950	
19	Ritruedee Kumsiriratn (THA)	12.950	9.350	10.450	11.200	43.950	
20	Thidaporn Khanthara (THA)	12.900	8.500	11.000	10.050	42.450	
21	Long Thị Ngọc Huỳnh (VIE)	13.050	8.250	10.550	10.300	42.150	
22	Ma. Cristina Onofre (PHI)	12.950	4.450	9.000	12.400	38.800	

=== Vault ===
Pos.	Gymnast	Score 1	Score 2	Total	Notes
1	Rifda Irfanaluthfi (INA)	13.700	13.850	13.775	Q
2	Kanyanat Boontoeng (THA)	13.450	13.300	13.375	Q
3	Farah Ann Abdul Hadi (MAS)	13.550	13.100	13.325	Q
4	Praewpraw Doungchan (THA)	13.200	13.300	13.250	Q
5	Phan Thị Hà Thanh (VIE)	12.650	13.800	13.225	Q
6	Tan Ing Yueh (MAS)	13.350	12.850	13.100	Q
7	Siti Nur Bahirah Ahmad (MAS)	13.250	12.800	13.025	
8	Michelle Teo (SIN)	13.100	12.900	13.000	Q
9	Đỗ Thị Vân Anh (VIE)	13.400	12.550	12.975	Q
10	Ma. Cristina Onofre (PHI)	12.950	12.900	12.925	R1
11	Sofia Isabel Gonzalez (PHI)	12.850	12.900	12.875	R2
12	Ritruedee Kumsiriratn (THA)	12.950	12.300	12.625	
13	Kotchakorn Sukhum (THA)	12.800	12.350	12.575	
14	Sahirah Sahirah (INA)	12.800	12.350	12.575	R3
15	Nadine Nathan (SIN)	13.650	0.000	6.825	
16	Rachelle Arellano (PHI)	12.350	0.000	6.175	
−	Janessa Dai (SIN)	13.300	−	13.300	
−	Lavinia Michelle Jayadev (MAS)	13.300	−	13.300	
−	Lizzy LeDuc (PHI)	13.250	−	13.250	
−	Đỗ Thị Thu Huyền (VIE)	13.150	−	13.150	
−	Ava Verdeflor (PHI)	13.050	−	13.050	
−	Long Thị Ngọc Huỳnh (VIE)	13.050	−	13.050	
−	Thidaporn Khanthara (THA)	12.900	−	12.900	
−	Tracie Ang (MAS)	12.900	−	12.900	
−	Kelsie Muir (SIN)	12.600	−	12.600	
−	Zeng Qiyan (SIN)	11.600	−	11.600	

=== Uneven bars ===
Pos.	Gymnast	Uneven bars	Notes
1	Farah Ann Abdul Hadi (MAS)	13.200	Q
2	Ava Verdeflor (PHI)	12.650	Q
3	Tan Ing Yueh (MAS)	12.500	Q
4	Janessa Dai (SIN)	12.350	Q
5	Ashly Lau (SIN)	12.300	Q
6	Siti Nur Bahirah Ahmad (MAS)	12.050	
7	Nadine Nathan (SIN)	11.800	
8	Tracie Ang (MAS)	11.650	
9	Zeng Qiyan (SIN)	11.550	
10	Praewpraw Doungchan (THA)	11.550	Q
11	Đỗ Thị Thu Huyền (VIE)	11.300	Q
12	Phan Thị Hà Thanh (VIE)	11.150	Q
13	Michelle Teo (SIN)	10.900	
14	Lizzy LeDuc (PHI)	10.800	R1
15	Đỗ Thị Vân Anh (VIE)	10.500	
16	Rifda Irfanaluthfi (INA)	10.250	R2
17	Lavinia Michelle Jayadev (MAS)	9.550	
18	Ritruedee Kumsiriratn (MAS)	9.350	R3
19	Rachelle Arellano (PHI)	8.950	
20	Kanyarat Suphasa (THA)	8.800	
21	Kanyanat Boontoeng (THA)	8.500	
22	Thidaporn Khanthara (THA)	8.500	
23	Sofia Isabel Gonzalez (THA)	8.450	
24	Long Thị Ngọc Huỳnh (VIE)	8.250	
25	Ma. Cristina Onofre (PHI)	4.450	

=== Balance beam ===
Pos.	Gymnast	Balance beam	Notes
1	Phan Thị Hà Thanh (VIE)	14.400	Q
2	Rifda Irfanaluthfi (INA)	13.450	Q
3	Lizzy LeDuc (PHI)	13.050	Q
4	Nadine Nathan (SIN)	13.050	Q
5	Ashly Lau (SIN)	12.850	Q
6	Đỗ Thị Vân Anh (VIE)	12.800	Q
7	Praewpraw Doungchan (THA)	12.750	Q
8	Farah Ann Abdul Hadi (MAS)	12.700	Q
9	Nur Eli Ellina Azmi (MAS)	12.600	R1
10	Ava Verdeflor (PHI)	12.600	R2
11	Tracie Ang (MAS)	12.600	
12	Michelle Teo (SIN)	12.450	
13	Sofia Isabel Gonzalez (PHI)	12.350	
14	Janessa Dai (SIN)	12.300	
15	Tan Ing Yueh (MAS)	12.200	
16	Đỗ Thị Thu Huyền (VIE)	11.900	
17	Zeng Qiyan (SIN)	11.600	
18	Lavinia Michelle Jayadev (MAS)	11.150	
19	Thidaporn Khanthara (THA)	11.000	R3
20	Sahirah Sahirah (INA)	10.800	
21	Rachelle Arellano (PHI)	10.600	
22	Long Thị Ngọc Huỳnh (VIE)	10.550	
23	Kanyanat Boontoeng (THA)	10.500	
24	Ritruedee Kumsiriratn (THA)	10.450	
25	Kotchakorn Sukhum (THA)	10.100	
26	Ma. Cristina Onofre (PHI)	9.000	

=== Floor exercise ===
Pos.	Gymnast	Floor (gymnastics)	Notes
1	Farah Ann Abdul Hadi (MAS)	13.800	Q
2	Rifda Irfanaluthfi (INA)	13.450	Q
3	Tan Ing Yueh (MAS)	13.350	Q
4	Tracie Ang (MAS)	13.250	
5	Phan Thị Hà Thanh (VIE)	13.250	Q
6	Nadine Nathan (SIN)	13.200	Q
7	Janessa Dai (SIN)	12.900	Q
8	Lavinia Michelle Jayadev (MAS)	12.850	
9	Zeng Qiyan (SIN)	12.800	
10	Lizzy LeDuc (PHI)	12.800	Q
11	Ava Verdeflor (PHI)	12.450	Q
12	Ma. Cristina Onofre (PHI)	12.400	
13	Michelle Teo (SIN)	12.300	
14	Đỗ Thị Thu Huyền (VIE)	12.300	R1
15	Đỗ Thị Vân Anh (VIE)	12.300	
16	Praewpraw Doungchan (THA)	12.250	R2
17	Sofia Isabel Gonzalez (PHI)	12.200	
18	Nur Eli Ellina Azmi (MAS)	12.050	
19	Rachelle Arellano (PHI)	12.050	
20	Kelsie Muir (SIN)	11.950	
21	Kanyanat Boontoeng (THA)	11.800	R3
22	Sahirah Sahirah (INA)	11.250	
23	Ritruedee Kumsiriratn (THA)	11.200	
24	Kotchakorn Sukhum (THA)	10.450	
25	Long Thị Ngọc Huỳnh (VIE)	10.300	
26	Thidaporn Khanthara (THA)	10.050	
