= Gymnastics at the 2015 SEA Games – Men's artistic individual all-around =

Gymnastics – Men's artistic individual all-around at the 2015 SEA Games
- Venue: Bishan Sports Hall
- Date: 8 June 2015
- Competitors: 13 from 7 nations

Medalists
gold medal	Đinh Phương Thành	Vietnam
silver medal	Phạm Phước Hưng	Vietnam
bronze medal	Gabriel Gan	Singapore

The men's artistic individual all-around competition at the 2015 SEA Games was held on 8 June 2015 at the Bishan Sports Hall in Singapore.

== Schedule ==
All times are Singapore Standard Time (UTC+8).

Date	Time	Event
Monday, 8 June 2015	11:00	Final

== Qualification ==
Qualification took place on 6 June 2015 as part of the team and individual qualification event.

== Results ==
Source: Gymnastics – Artistic Men's Individual All-Around Final Results

Rank	Gymnast	Floor (gymnastics)	Pommel horse	Rings (gymnastics)	Vault (gymnastics)	Parallel bars	Horizontal bar	Total
1st place, gold medalist(s)	Đinh Phương Thành (VIE)	14.600	14.100	13.350	14.500	15.800	13.800	86.150
2nd place, silver medalist(s)	Phạm Phước Hưng (VIE)	14.450	12.800	14.850	14.200	15.650	13.300	85.250
3rd place, bronze medalist(s)	Gabriel Gan (SIN)	13.650	13.400	12.400	13.550	13.300	13.050	79.350
4	Timothy Tay (SIN)	13.100	12.400	12.200	13.600	13.800	13.150	78.250
5	Jamorn Prommanee (THA)	14.300	14.250	12.350	12.300	13.100	11.800	78.100
6	Weena Chokpaoumpai (THA)	12.800	10.400	12.950	14.500	14.150	11.900	76.700
7	Jeremiah Loo Phay Xing (MAS)	11.800	11.500	12.550	13.500	13.300	13.150	75.800
8	Trisna Ramdhany (INA)	13.550	12.450	9.400	13.350	12.350	10.500	71.600
8	Rafael Iii Ablaza (PHI)	13.150	10.250	11.450	13.700	12.000	11.050	71.600
10	Jan Gwynn Timbang (PHI)	13.950	8.900	9.700	13.750	12.050	10.650	69.000
11	Oo Myo Zaw (MYA)	12.150	9.900	8.100	12.550	9.350	9.650	61.700
12	Aung Zin Lin (MYA)	12.600	1.350	8.500	11.450	10.450	5.400	49.750
