= Gymnastics at the 2015 SEA Games – Women's rhythmic group all-around =

Gymnastics – Women's rhythmic group all-around at the 2015 SEA Games
- Venue: Bishan Sports Hall
- Date: 14 June 2015
- Competitors: 17 from 3 nations

Medalists
gold medal	Dawne Chua Yun Xi; Noelle Goh; Edlyn Ho Zen Yee; Ann Sim Kwee Peng; Alison Tang Wan Xuan	Singapore
silver medal	Chai Xin Nong; Chan Mei Thung; Loo Shiow Yng; Thew Yue Jia; Yap Qian Ling; Yap Sin Lu	Malaysia

The women's rhythmic group all-around at the 2015 SEA Games was held on 14 June 2015 at the Bishan Sports Hall in Singapore.

== Schedule ==
All times are Singapore Standard Time (UTC+8).

Date	Time	Event
Sunday, 14 June 2015	15:00	Final

== Results ==
Source: Results - Women's rhythmic group all-around

Rank	Nation	5	6 + 2	Total
1st place, gold medalist(s)	Singapore (SIN); Dawne Chua Yun Xi; Noelle Goh; Edlyn Ho Zen Yee; Ann Sim Kwee Peng; Alison Tang Wan Xuan	14.350	13.350	27.700
2nd place, silver medalist(s)	Malaysia (MAS); Chai Xin Nong; Chan Mei Thung; Loo Shiow Yng; Thew Yue Jia; Yap Qian Ling; Yap Sin Lu	12.850	14.550	27.400
3	Thailand (THA); Phasika Chetsadalak; Pornchanit Junthabud; Spanna Piyasaengcharoen; Patarathida Ratanasatien; Iriya Rungrueang; Wareeporn Taengmanee	9.500	12.650	22.150
