= Gymnastics at the 2015 SEA Games – Men's vault =

Gymnastics – Men's vault at the 2015 SEA Games
- Venue: Bishan Sports Hall
- Date: 10 June 2015
- Competitors: 8 from 6 nations

Medalists
gold medal	Lê Thanh Tùng	Vietnam
silver medal	Hoàng Cường	Vietnam
bronze medal	Reyland Cappelan	Philippines

The Men's vault competition at the 2015 SEA Games was held on 10 June 2015 at the Bishan Sports Hall in Singapore.

== Schedule ==
All times are Singapore Standard Time (UTC+8).

Date	Time	Event
Saturday, 6 June 2015	09:00	Qualification
Wednesday, 10 June 2015	14:00	Final

== Qualification ==
Qualification took place on 6 June 2015 as part of the team and individual qualification event.

== Results ==
Source: Results - Men's vault

Pos.	Gymnast	Vault 1				Vault 2				Total
Pos.	Gymnast	D Score	E Score	Penalty	Vault Score	D Score	E Score	Penalty	Vault Score	Total
1st place, gold medalist(s)	Lê Thanh Tùng (VIE)	6.000	9.000		15.000	5.600	9.400		15.000	15.000
2nd place, silver medalist(s)	Hoàng Cường (VIE)	5.600	9.200		14.800	6.000	8.933		14.933	14.866
3rd place, bronze medalist(s)	Reyland Cappelan (PHI)	5.600	9.066		14.666	5.200	9.366		14.566	14.616
4	Weena Chokpaoumpai (THA)	5.200	9.300		14.500	5.200	9.300		14.500	14.500
5	Agus Adi Prayoko (INA)	6.000	8.166	0.100	14.066	5.600	9.033		14.633	14.349
6	Mohd Abd Azim Othman (MAS)	5.600	8.266		13.866	5.600	8.833		14.433	14.149
7	Hoe Wah Toon (SIN)	5.200	8.800	0.300	13.700	5.200	9.166		14.366	14.033
8	Terry Tay (SIN)	5.200	8.466		13.666	5.200	8.033		13.233	13.449
