= Farah Ann Abdul Hadi =

Malaysian former artistic gymnast

- Farah Ann at the 2017 SEA Games

Personal information
- Full name: Farah Ann binti Abdul Hadi
- Born: 3 May 1994 (age 32) Subang Jaya, Selangor, Malaysia
- Height: 165 cm (5 ft 5 in)

Gymnastics career
- Discipline: Women's artistic gymnastics
- Retired: 12 March 2022
Medal record
Women's gymnastics
Representing Malaysia
Southeast Asian Games
Gold medal – first place	2015 Singapore	Team
Gold medal – first place	2015 Singapore	Floor exercise
Gold medal – first place	2017 Kuala Lumpur	Team
Gold medal – first place	2017 Kuala Lumpur	Floor exercise
Gold medal – first place	2019 Philippines	All-around
Gold medal – first place	2019 Philippines	Uneven bars
Gold medal – first place	2019 Philippines	Floor exercise
Silver medal – second place	2011 Palembang	Uneven bars
Silver medal – second place	2015 Singapore	All-around
Bronze medal – third place	2015 Singapore	Vault
Bronze medal – third place	2015 Singapore	Uneven bars
Bronze medal – third place	2015 Singapore	Balance beam

Farah Ann binti Abdul Hadi (born 3 May 1994) is a Malaysian former artistic gymnast.

== Early life ==
Farah was born in Subang Jaya, Selangor, to a Malaysian father, Abdul Hadi Ahmad and a Canadian mother, Kimberly Ann Gagnon on 3 May 1994. She is the second of three children and her sister, Katrina Ann, is a former national synchronized swimmer.

== Career ==
She took up gymnastics at age three and started to compete at the national level competition Sukma Games. Farah Ann made her first appearance at the 2010 Games in New Delhi, scoring 12.050 points (floor exercise), 10.500 (beam) and 10.250 (uneven bars) as Malaysia finished fourth in the team event. In 2014, Farah Ann then took up the bronze in the floor exercise and the team event at the Artistic Celtic Cup-Commonwealth Invitational in Perth, Scotland. Later that year, she finished in 11th place out of 24 gymnasts in the women's individual all-round finals at the Commonwealth Games in Glasgow, Scotland. After the Commonwealth Games, she competed in the Asian Games in Incheon, South Korea. During the qualification stage, she placed sixth on the vaults (13.650 points), sixth in the uneven bars (12.800), 12th in the balance beam (12.250) and fourth in the floor exercise (13.050). She made it to the finals in the floor exercise, and finished 7th.

In 2015, she competed at the Southeast Asian Games (SEA Games), competing in all events — bars, beam, vaults, floor exercise, individual and team — in the preliminary round of the competition and made it to the finals of all events. She took up her first gold medal in the team event, followed by a second in the floor exercise. She then gained a silver medal each in both the uneven bars, and individual events. The Malaysian gymnast won bronze medals in the vault, balance beam, as well as the uneven bars event, where another Malaysian gymnast Tan Ing Yueh took the gold.

After barely missing Rio 2016, she qualified for the Tokyo 2020 Olympics when she finished 59th out of 180 gymnasts in the qualifying session of the individual all-around event at the 2019 World Artistic Gymnastics Championships in Stuttgart, Germany. She is only the third Malaysian gymnast to qualify for the Olympics, after Au Li Yen in Sydney 2000 and Ng Shu Wai in Athens 2004.

On 12 March 2022, she announced her retirement from the career through her social media and expressed her appreciation to the people and the opportunity of being in the career which she worked hard in as being described by her as "the people I have met along the way, to all the guidance, love and support, thank you. It has been a ride of a lifetime, giving everything that I have, all my love, passion and dedication".

== Filmography ==
•Generasi Perfect 10 2025 As Herself (sister Victoria)

== Awards and nominations ==
Year	Award	Category	Result	Ref(s)
2016	Anugerah Pilihan Online	Online Choice Female Sports Star	Nominated	
2016	Ahli Kegemilangan Sukan Selangor	None	recipients	
