= Reyland Capellan =

Filipino artistic gymnast (born 1993)

- Full name: Reyland Capellan
- Nickname: Jojo
- Born: 7 September 1993 (age 33) Cataingan, Masbate, Philippines

Gymnastics career
- Discipline: Men's artistic gymnastics
- Country represented: Philippines; (2015–present)
Medal record
Representing Philippines
Event	1st	2nd	3rd
Southeast Asian Games	2	0	2
Total	2	0	2
Southeast Asian Games
Gold medal – first place	2015 Singapore	Floor
Gold medal – first place	2017 Kuala Lumpur	Floor
Bronze medal – third place	2015 Singapore	Vault
Bronze medal – third place	2017 Kuala Lumpur	Vault

Reyland Capellan (born 7 September 1993) is a Filipino male artistic gymnast, representing his nation at international competitions. He competed at world championships, including the 2015 World Artistic Gymnastics Championships in Glasgow. He also competed in the gymnastics competitions at the 2015 Southeast Asian Games. He got gold on Floor and bronze on Vault. Capellan ended the Philippines' 10-year drought of gold medals, since Roel Ramirez won at the 2005 Games in the Men's Vault. He competed once again in the 2017 Southeast Asian Games and defended his floor title.
