= Kaitlin De Guzman =

Filipino-American artistic gymnast

- De Guzman at the 2017 SEA Games

Personal information
- Full name: Kaitlin De Guzman
- Nickname: Guzie
- Born: 28 July 2000 (age 26) Mandaluyong, Philippines
- Height: 4 ft 11 in (150 cm)

Gymnastics career
- Discipline: Women's artistic gymnastics
- Country represented: Philippines; (2017 (PHI))
- College team: Kentucky Wildcats (2020–2023)
- Club: Metroplex Gymnastics
- Head coaches: Gina Quinlan; Marnie Futch
- Assistant coach: Tammy De Guzman
Medal record
Representing Philippines
Southeast Asian Games
Gold medal – first place	2017 Kuala Lumpur	Uneven Bars
Silver medal – second place	2017 Kuala Lumpur	Floor exercise
Bronze medal – third place	2017 Kuala Lumpur	Balance beam

Kaitlin De Guzman (born 28 July 2000) is a Filipino-American female artistic gymnast. She competed at international competitions for the Philippines including the 2017 Southeast Asian Games in Kuala Lumpur, where she won the gold in uneven bars.

She also competed in gymnastics competitions in the United States, including the 2016 P&G Championships in St. Louis, Mo., the 2016 and 2015 Secret U.S. Classic, and the 2015 and 2014 editions of the Nastia Liukin Cup in Greensboro, N.C.

She is the daughter of Cintamoni De Guzman, the country's gold medalist in the uneven bars event during the 1995 Southeast Asian Games in Chiang Mai. The elder De Guzman also took part in the 1997 Southeast Asian Games in Jakarta, where she won a gold medal in the team event.

== National Competition Results ==
- 2016 P&G Championships, St. Louis, Mo. -
- 2016 Secret U.S. Classic, Hartford, Conn. -
- 2015 Secret U.S. Classic, Chicago, Ill. - (Jr. Div.)
- 2015 Women's Junior Olympic Level 10 National Championships, Des Moines, Iowa - 2nd-BB (T) (Jr. B)
- 2015 Nastia Liukin Cup, Arlington, Texas - 5th-FX; 8th-BB (T) (Jr. Div.)
- 2014 Women's Junior Olympic Level 10 National Championships, Jackson, Miss. - 1st-BB; 3rd-AA; 5th-UB (Jr. A)
- 2014 Level 10 Regionals - 2nd AA, 2nd UB, 2nd BB, 5th FX (Jr. A)
- 2014 Level 10 State - 1st AA, 1st BB, 2nd FX, 2nd UB
- 2014 Nastia Liukin Cup, Greensboro, N.C. - (Jr. Div.)
- 2013 Level 9 Westerns - 1st Bars, 2nd-Beam, 4th-AA
- 2013 Level 9 Regionals - 1st-Bars, 8th-AA, 8th-VT
- 2013 Level 9 State - 1st-AA, 1st-UB, 1st-BB, 2nd-FX, 4th-VT
