= Ava Verdeflor =

Filipino-American artistic gymnast

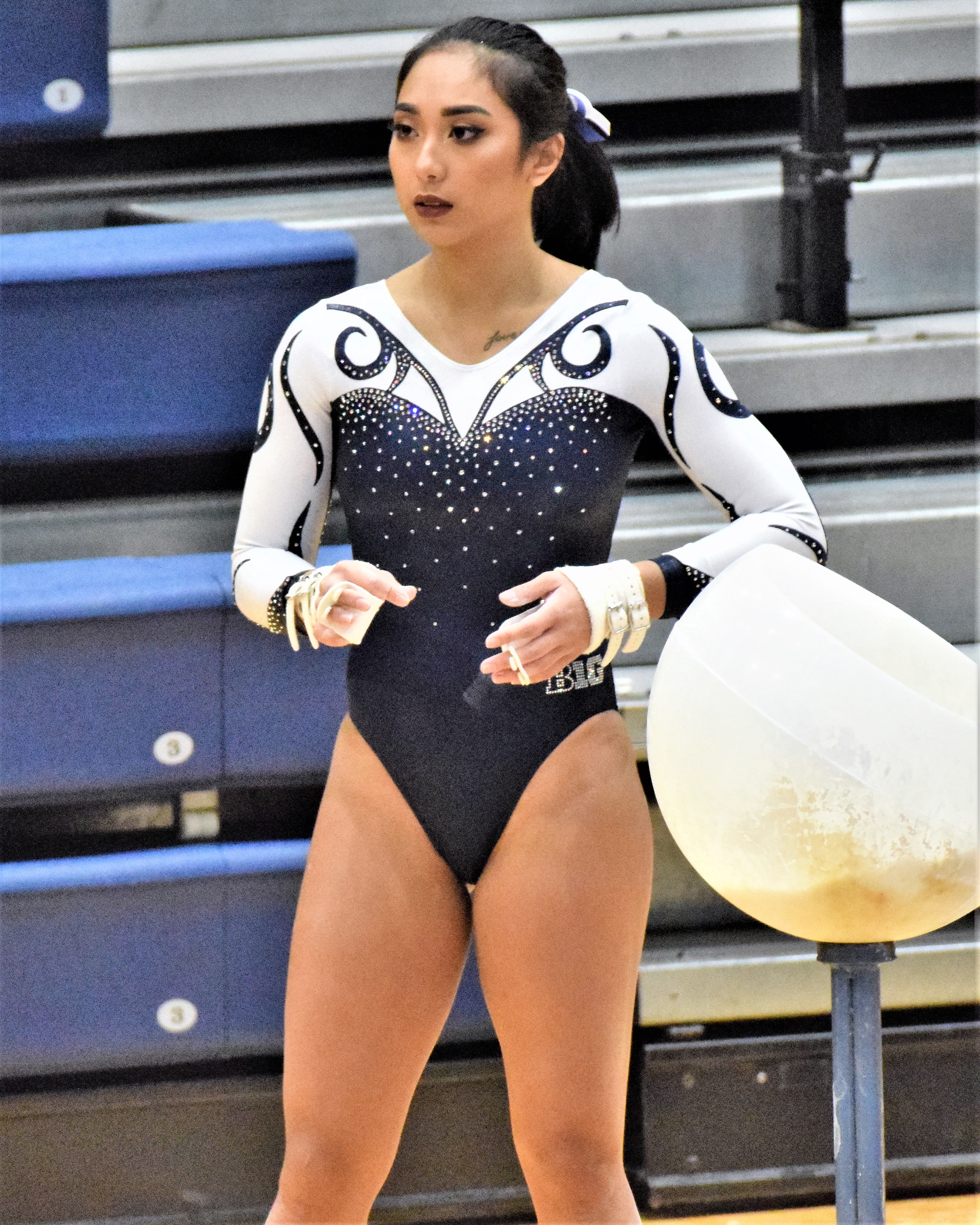
- Verdeflor in 2018

Personal information
- Full name: Ava Lorein Santos Verdeflor
- Born: 2 January 1999 (age 27) Tarlac, Philippines
- Height: 5 ft 3 in (160 cm)

Gymnastics career
- Discipline: Women's artistic gymnastics
- Country represented: Philippines (2014–2015)
- College team: Penn State Nittany Lions (2018–2021)
- Training location: Allen, Texas, United States
- Club: WOGA
- Head coach: Yevgeny Marchenko
Medal record
Women's artistic gymnastics
Representing Philippines
Southeast Asian Games
Silver medal – second place	2015 Singapore	Uneven bars
Bronze medal – third place	2015 Singapore	Team

Ava Lorein Santos Verdeflor (born 2 January 1999) is a Filipino-American former artistic gymnast. She represented the Philippines at the 2014 Summer Youth Olympics and at the 2015 World Championships. At the 2015 Southeast Asian Games, she won a silver medal on the uneven bars and a bronze medal in the team event. After finishing her international elite career, she competed in NCAA for Penn State University.

== Gymnastics career ==
Verdeflor was born in the Philippines and lived in Singapore when she was young. She moved to the United States with her family when she was three years old. She holds dual citizenship and chose to represent her birth country in international competitions.

=== Junior elite ===
Verdeflor made her international debut at the 2014 Nadia Comaneci Invitational and finished fifth in the all-around and won the gold medal on the uneven bars. She competed at the 2014 Junior Asian Championships in Tashkent, Uzbekistan, and placed 12th in the all-around, securing a qualifying spot to the 2014 Summer Youth Olympics in Nanjing, China. She represented the Philippines at the 2014 Summer Youth Olympics and was the oldest female artistic gymnast in the competition. She advanced into the all-around final and placed 11th. She also advanced into the uneven bars final, where she finished sixth.

=== Senior elite ===
Verdeflor became age-eligible for senior competitions in 2015. At the 2015 Southeast Asian Games, she helped the Philippines team win the bronze medal behind Malaysia and Singapore. She advanced into the all-around final and finished in fourth place. She then won a silver medal in the uneven bars final. She then competed at the 2015 World Championships and finished 122nd in the all-around during the qualification round. This was the final competition of her international elite career.

=== NCAA ===
Verdeflor joined the Penn State gymnastics team starting in the 2018 season and had not competed in two years due to two ACL tears. She competed on the uneven bars and the balance beam throughout her four seasons and scored a career high of 9.950 on the uneven bars during her senior season. For the 2019 and 2020 seasons, she was a WCGA Academic All-American and an Academic All-Big Ten team member. She was named to the 2021 All-Big Ten second team. Her final competition was the 2021 NCAA Morgantown Regional where she scored a 9.925 on the uneven bars but did not advance to the NCAA Championships. She was a nominee for the 2021 AAI Award which is for the most outstanding senior in NCAA women's gymnastics.
