= Nadine Joy Nathan =

Singaporean artistic gymnast (born 1999)

- Born: 29 December 1999 (age 26) Singapore

Gymnastics career
- Discipline: Women's artistic gymnastics
- Country represented: Singapore
Medal record
Representing Singapore
Southeast Asian Games
Silver medal – second place	2015 Singapore	Team
Silver medal – second place	2017 Kuala Lumpur	Team
Bronze medal – third place	2015 Singapore	All-around
Bronze medal – third place	2021 Vietnam	Team
Bronze medal – third place	2021 Vietnam	Uneven bars

Nadine Joy Nathan (born 29 December 1999) is a Singaporean artistic gymnast. She represented Singapore at the 2014 Summer Youth Olympics and has competed at four World Championships (2015, 2018, 2022, 2023). She is the 2015 SEA Games all-around bronze medalist and the 2021 SEA Games uneven bars bronze medalist.

== Gymnastics career ==
Nathan qualified to represent Singapore at the 2014 Summer Youth Olympics through her results at the 2014 Junior Asian Championships. There, she qualified for the all-around final but finished in 18th after falls on the uneven bars and the floor exercise.

Nathan became age-eligible for senior competition in 2015. At the 2015 SEA Games, she helped Singapore win the team silver medal, and she won the individual all-around bronze medal. That year, she competed at her first World Championships and finished 106th in the all-around qualifications, and she did not advance into any finals or receive an Olympic berth.

Nathan finished 14th at the 2016 Pacific Rim Championships. She helped Singapore defend its team silver medal at the 2017 SEA Games. She skipped the 2017 World Championships to focus on her GCE A-level exams.

Nathan represented Singapore at the 2018 Asian Games and finished 13th in the all-around. There, she advanced into the balance beam final and finished seventh. She then competed at the 2018 World Championships and finished 95th in the all-around qualifications. She missed the 2019 World Championships due to an ankle injury.

At the 2021 SEA Games, Nathan won a bronze medal in the team competition and won an individual bronze medal on the uneven bars. She represented Singapore at the 2022 Commonwealth Games and finished 11th in the all-around final. At the 2023 Asian Championships, Nathan finished 11th in the all-around and also advanced into the balance beam final. With these results, she qualified for the 2023 World Championships. There, she finished 100th in the all-around qualifications and did not qualify for an Olympic berth.
