= Lizzy LeDuc =

Filipino-American artistic gymnast

- Full name: Elizabeth Consuelo LeDuc
- Nickname: Lizzy
- Born: March 2, 1997 (age 29) San Diego, California
- Height: 154 cm (5 ft 1 in)

Gymnastics career
- Discipline: Women's artistic gymnastics
- Country represented: Philippines (2015-present)
- Former countries represented: United States
- College team: Illinois Fighting Illini
- Club: Zenith Elite
Medal record
Representing Philippines
Southeast Asian Games
Bronze medal – third place	2015 Singapore	Team

Elizabeth Consuelo LeDuc (born March 2, 1997) is a Filipino-American artistic gymnast. She started representing the Philippines in international competition in 2015, but has competed at U.S. domestic competitions as an elite, also.

== Early years ==
Elizabeth Consuelo LeDuc was born on March 2, 1997, in San Diego, California, to Connie and Henry LeDuc. She has an older sister, Crystal, who also has experience in competitive gymnastics. Additionally, she has three other sisters; Michelle, Tiffany and Niki-Lynn as well as a brother, Cyril.

LeDuc started her gymnastics career at a gym called Miahaiuc Gymnastics in Webster, Texas. In 2006, Lizzy moved to Woodlands Gymnastics Academy in The Woodlands, Texas.

== Gymnastics career ==
In 2009, LeDuc moved up to Level 10 and was crowned the 2009 J.O. National champion for the Junior A division. After the Junior Olympic season, she qualified to Junior International Elite status and competed at the 2009 CoverGirl Classic; finishing 20th. Later, Lizzy advanced to Nationals and placed 21st; tied with Talia Chiarelli.

After 2009 Nationals, LeDuc moved to World Olympic Gymnastics Academy and, the following season, participated in the club's annual meet, the WOGA Classic, finishing 5th all-around. LeDuc finished 7th at the National Elite Qualifier in July. Soon after, she took home 14th all-around at the 2010 CoverGirl Classic and then, 20th at Nationals.

LeDuc won the 2011 Houston National Invitational but sat out the rest of the season due to sprains in both her elbows. In the fall of 2011, Lizzy moved to Zenith Elite Gymnastics Academy in McKinney, Texas.

LeDuc also sat out the 2012 season, also. She moved to Metroplex for the 2013 season and finished fourth all-around at J.O. Nationals in the Junior D division. In 2014, LeDuc was State and Regional Champion and placed second all-around at the 2014 J.O. Nationals, behind Alicia Boren. On April 28, 2014, LeDuc announced a verbal commitment to Louisiana State University.

In 2015, Lizzy signed the National Letter of Intent to University of Illinois and to compete on the Illinois Fighting Illini women's gymnastics team, hence decommiting from LSU. LeDuc competed once during the 2015 Level 10 J.O. season, at the Rose City Classic. She participated in her first international competition at the 2015 Southeast Asian Games, held during June 5–16 in Singapore. LeDuc won a bronze medal with the team During the all-around final, LeDuc finished 6th. She is set to participate in two event finals; beam and floor.

== Personal life ==
LeDuc lives in Allen, Texas. In the fall of 2015, she started attending the University of Illinois.
