= Phạm Phước Hưng =

Vietnamese artistic gymnast

- Born: 10 June 1988 (age 38) Hanoi, Vietnam
- Height: 1.65 m (5 ft 5 in)

Gymnastics career
- Discipline: Men's artistic gymnastics
- Country represented: Vietnam
Medal record
Men's artistic gymnastics
Representing Vietnam
Southeast Asian Games
| Gold medal – first place | 2005 Philippines | Parallel bars |
| Gold medal – first place | 2007 Nakhon Ratchasima | Horizontal bar |
| Gold medal – first place | 2011 Palembang | Team |
| Gold medal – first place | 2011 Palembang | Horizontal bar |
| Gold medal – first place | 2015 Singapore | Team |
| Silver medal – second place | 2007 Nakhon Ratchasima | Team |
| Silver medal – second place | 2007 Nakhon Ratchasima | Parallel bars |
| Silver medal – second place | 2011 Palembang | All-around |
| Silver medal – second place | 2011 Palembang | Rings |
| Silver medal – second place | 2011 Palembang | Parallel bars |
| Silver medal – second place | 2015 Singapore | All-around |
| Silver medal – second place | 2015 Singapore | Rings |
| Bronze medal – third place | 2005 Philippines | Team |
| Bronze medal – third place | 2015 Singapore | Floor |
| Bronze medal – third place | 2015 Singapore | Parallel bars |

Phạm Phước Hưng, born 10 June 1988, is a Vietnamese artistic gymnast from Hanoi. In 2012 he became the first gymnast to win a gold medal for Vietnam at World Challenge Cup, winning at the 2012 Artistic Gymnastics FIG World Cup in Ghent, Belgium. He qualified to represent Vietnam at the 2012 and 2016 Olympics.
