= Phan Thị Hà Thanh =

Vietnamese artistic gymnast

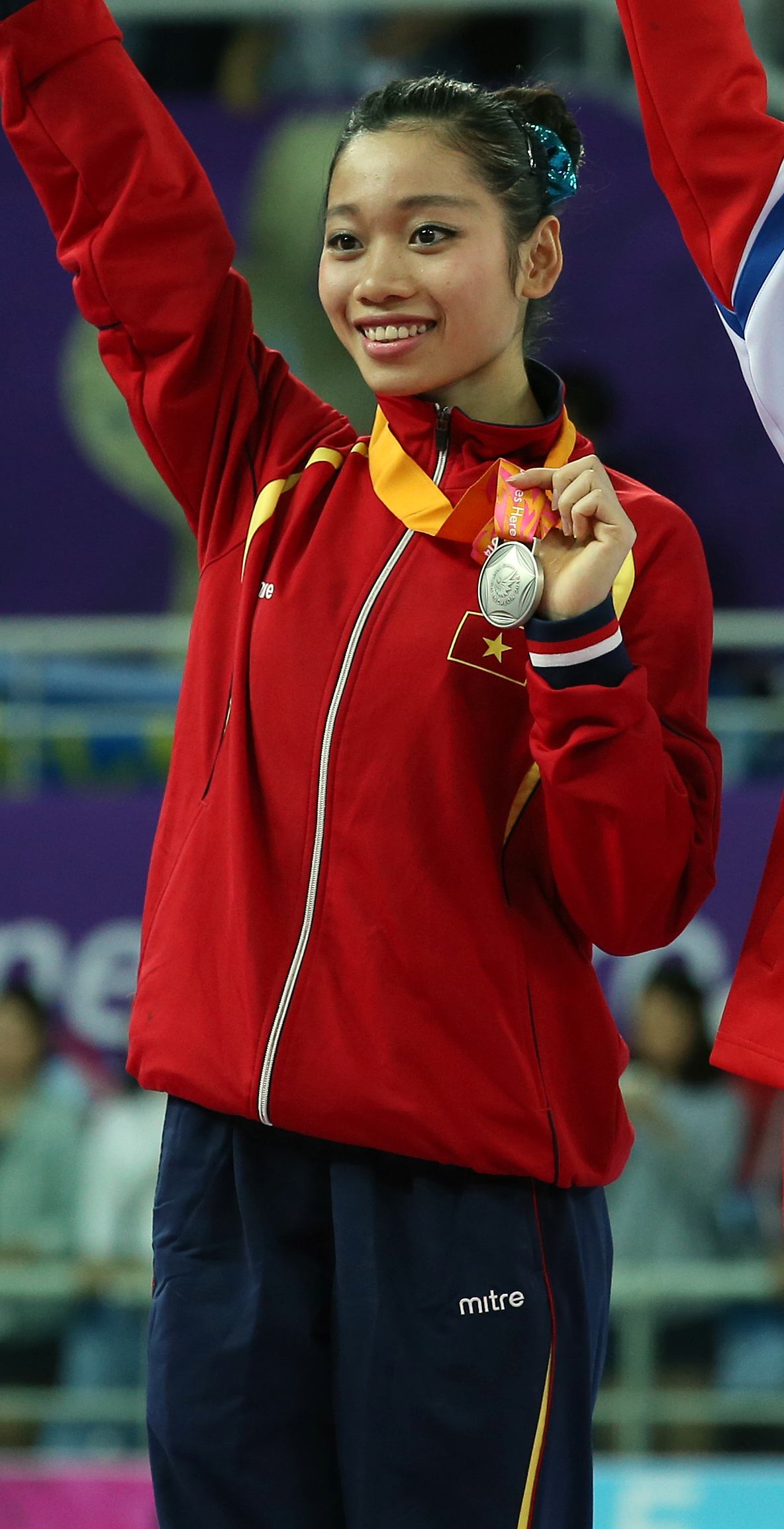
- Phan at the 2014 Asian Games in Incheon.

Personal information
- Born: October 16, 1991 (age 35) Hải Phòng, Vietnam
- Height: 163 cm (5 ft 4 in)

Gymnastics career
- Discipline: Women's artistic gymnastics
- Country represented: Vietnam
- Head coach: Nguyen Thi Thanh Thuy
- Retired: December 2016
Medal record
Artistic Gymnastics
Representing Vietnam
World Championships
Bronze medal – third place	2011 Tokyo	Vault
Asian Games
Silver medal – second place	2014 Incheon	Balance Beam
Bronze medal – third place	2014 Incheon	Vault
Asian Championships
Gold medal – first place	2012 Putian	Vault
Bronze medal – third place	2008 Doha	Vault
Southeast Asian Games
Gold medal – first place	2015 Singapore	All Around
Gold medal – first place	2015 Singapore	Vault
Gold medal – first place	2015 Singapore	Balance Beam
Gold medal – first place	2011 Palembang	All Around
Gold medal – first place	2011 Palembang	Vault
Gold medal – first place	2011 Palembang	Floor Exercise
Gold medal – first place	2007 Nakhon Ratchasima	Vault
Gold medal – first place	2003 Hanoi	Team
Silver medal – second place	2007 Nakhon Ratchasima	Team
Silver medal – second place	2005 Manila	Team
Bronze medal – third place	2015 Singapore	Floor Exercise
Bronze medal – third place	2011 Palembang	Balance Beam
Bronze medal – third place	2005 Manila	Balance Beam
Bronze medal – third place	2005 Manila	Floor Exercise
Event	1st	2nd	3rd
All-Around World Cup	0	0	0
Apparatus World Cup	0	2	0
World Challenge Cup	6	3	4
Total	6	5	4

Phan Thị Hà Thanh (born 16 October 1991) is a retired Vietnamese artistic gymnast from Haiphong and a two-time Olympian (2012 and 2016). She became the first gymnast to win a world medal for Vietnam, capturing the bronze on vault at the 2011 World Artistic Gymnastics Championships.

== Gymnastics career ==
=== 2009–2012 ===
Phan made her international debut at the 2009 World Artistic Gymnastics Championships in London. She competed in the qualifications round but did not score high enough to make any finals.

On 16 November 2010, she competed at the 2010 Asian Games in Guangzhou and finished fifth on the vault. She won silver medals on vault and balance beam at the 2010 World Cup in Porto, Portugal.

In 2011, Phan won the bronze medal on vault at the World Artistic Gymnastics Championships in Tokyo, to qualify as an individual competitor at the 2012 Summer Olympics in London.

In 2012, Phan competed at the London Olympic Games. She placed 12th on vault, third reserve for the vault final.

=== 2013–2016 ===
At the 6th Doha FIG World Challenge Cup in Doha, Qatar, on 28 March 2013, Phan placed first in the vault final, ahead of Romania's Larisa Iordache and Switzerland's Giulia Steingruber, with an average score of 14.825.

In the spring of 2015, she won the balance beam titles at two World Cup events (Doha and Varna, Bulgaria). Under pressure to medal in the team event at the Southeast Asian Games in Singapore, she led a minimal team of four gymnasts (full teams consisted of six gymnasts) with Đỗ Thị Vân Anh, Đỗ Thị Thu Huyen and newcomer Long Thị Ngọc Huỳnh. The team was plagued with injuries and finished fourth, and Phan qualified for all of the individual events. She went on to win the most gold medals of any gymnast at the competition (individual all-around, vault and balance beam), as well as a bronze on floor exercise. At the 2015 World Artistic Gymnastics Championships in Glasgow, she finished 85th in the all-around in qualifications with a total score of 51.033: 14.400 on vault (47th), 10.233 on uneven bars (193rd), 13.300 on balance beam (58th) and 13.100 on floor exercise (84th).

Phan finished 41st in the all-around competition at the 2016 Olympic Test Event to qualify for the 2016 Olympic Games in Rio de Janeiro. Competing with an injury, she scored 14.300 on vault, 11.600 on uneven bars, 13.800 on balance beam and 13.000 on floor exercise. One month later, she competed on vault and balance beam at the World Challenge Cup in Varna and finished second on both events (14.400 average on vault and 14.367 on balance beam).
