= Bishan Sports Hall =

Sports venue in Singapore

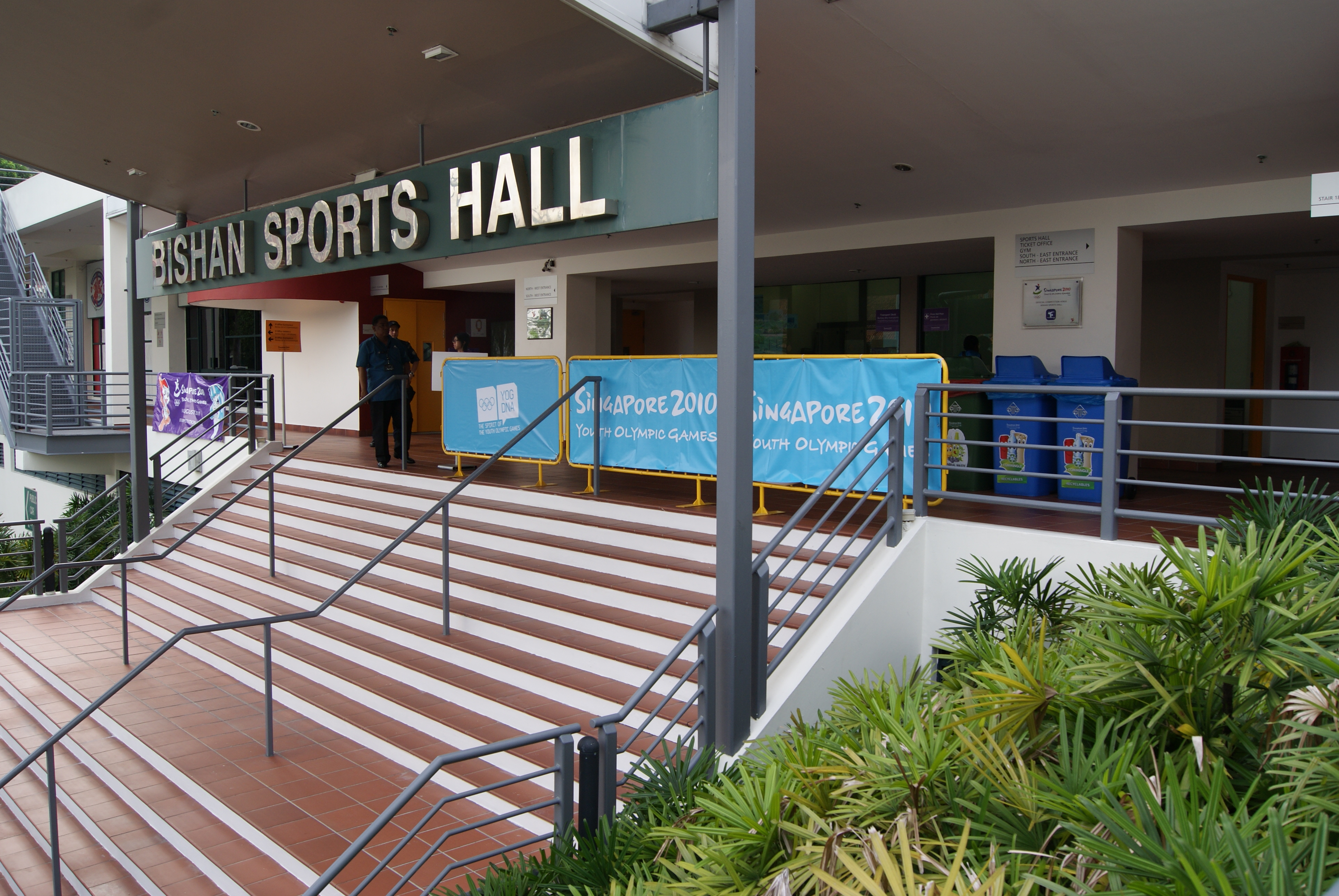
- Bishan Sports Hall during the 2010 Summer Youth Olympics
- Interactive map of Bishan Sports Hall
- Location: Bishan, Singapore
- Coordinates: 1°21′19.96″N 103°51′3.44″E
- Owner: Singapore Sports Council
- Operator: Singapore Sports Council
- Capacity: 1,920

Construction
- Renovated: 2009 (for the 2010 Summer Youth Olympics)

Bishan Sports Hall is a sports venue situated in the central part of Singapore at Bishan. It is part of the Bishan Sports Recreation Centre, which includes Bishan Stadium and Bishan Sports Complex.

== History ==
Bishan Sports Hall has been the de facto venue for the Singapore Open Gymnastics Championships since 2004. The Pesta Sukan Gymnastics Championship and ASEAN Schools Artistic and Rhythmic Championships were also held here in 2003 and 2004 respectively.

Bishan Sports Hall is the training venue for Singapore's national gymnastics team. Schools, clubs and gymnastics coaches also use the hall for various youth development and training programmes.

== 2010 Summer Youth Olympics ==
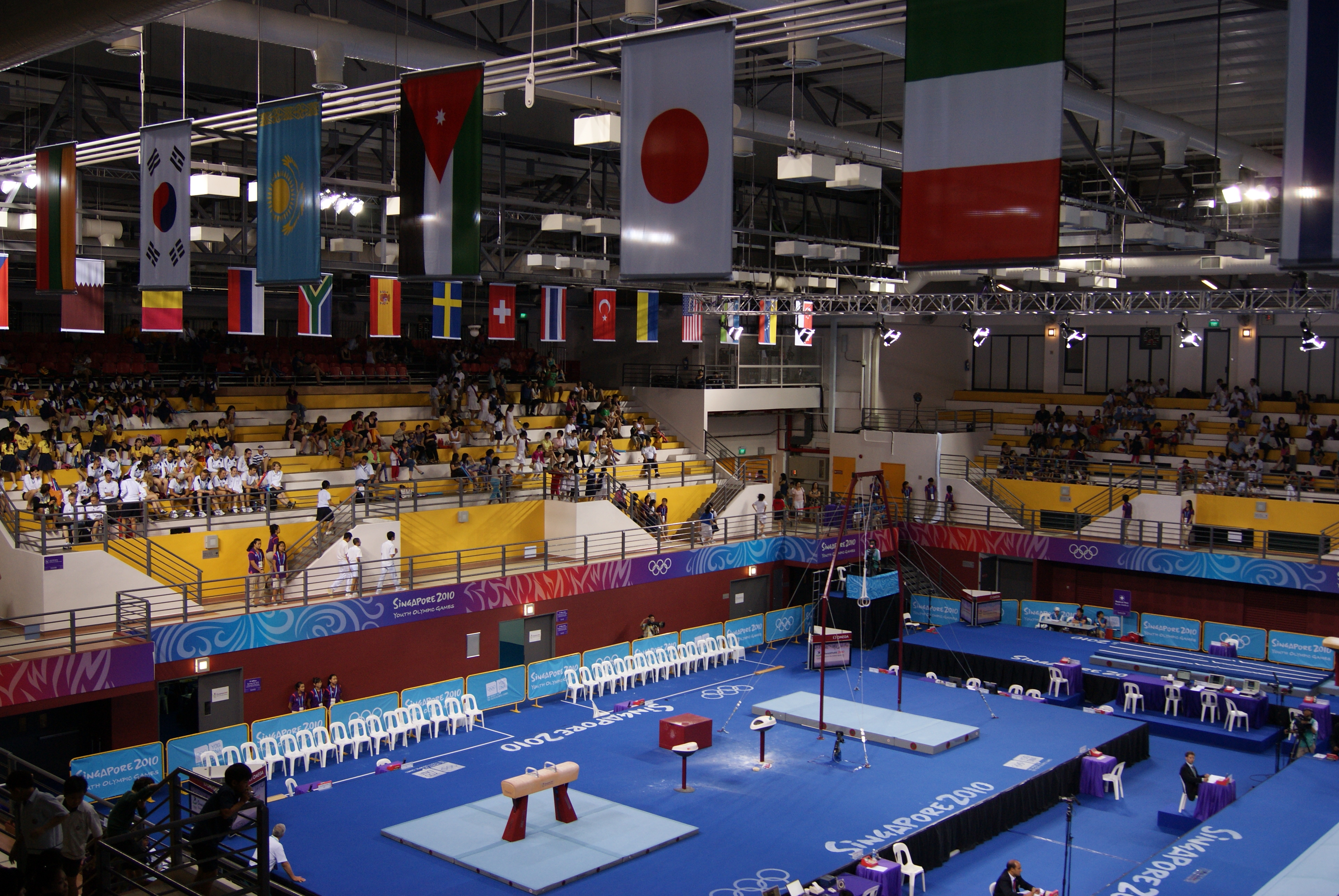
Bishan Sports Hall set up for the gymnastics competitions during the 2010 Summer Youth Olympics

Bishan Sports Hall was used as a competition venue for gymnastics during the 2010 Summer Youth Olympics.
