= Israel at the 2026 Summer Youth Olympics =

- IOC code: ISR
- NOC: Olympic Committee of Israel
- Website: www.olympicsil.co.il

in Dakar, Senegal 31 October – 13 November 2026
- Competitors: 11 (6 men and 5 women) in 8 sports and 16 events
- Flag bearers: Itamar Cohen & Ofir Simcha
- Medals Ranked 67th: Gold 0 Silver 1 Bronze 2 Total 3

Summer Youth Olympics appearances (overview)
- 2010; 2014; 2018; 2026

Israel is competeing at the 2026 Summer Youth Olympics in Dakar, Senegal from October 31 to November 13, 2026. This marks Israel's fourth appearance at the Youth Olympics, after making its debut in 2010.

The judoka Itamar Cohen and swimmer Ofir Simcha were chosen as the nation's flag bearers at the opening ceremony.

== Medalists ==
Medal	Name	Sport	Event	Date
Silver	Artur Prohnevsky	Boxing	Men's -65 kg	12 Nov
Bronze	Ofir Simcha	Swimming	Women's 200 m backstroke	1 Nov
Bronze	Ophir Shmuely; Tomer Tirosh	Artistic gymnastics	Mixed team	11 Nov

== Competitors ==
The Israeli delegation included 11 athletes, competing in 8 sports.

Sport	Men	Women	Total
Archery	1	1	2
Artistic gymnastics	1	1	2
Athletics	1	1	2
Boxing	1	0	1
Fencing	1	0	1
Judo	1	0	1
Sailing	0	1	1
Swimming	0	1	1
Total	6	5	11

== Archery ==
Israel entered two archers, one of each gender.

Athlete	Event	Ranking round		Round of 32	Round of 16	Quarterfinals	Semifinals	Final	
Athlete	Event	Score	Seed	Opposition Score	Opposition Score	Opposition Score	Opposition Score	Opposition Score	Rank
Yuval Raz	Men's individual	653	17	Góngora (MEX); W 6–5	Chen (TPE); L 0–6	Did not advance			12
Nicole Golovanevski	Women's individual	618	24	Edlich (GER); L 1–7	Did not advance				30
Nicole Golovanevski; Yuval Raz	Mixed team	1271	16	–	Lee / Kim (KOR); L 2–6	Did not advance			10

== Artistic gymnastics ==
Israel entered two gymnasts, one of each gender.

Girls

Athlete	Event	Qualification						Final					
Athlete	Event	Apparatus				Total	Rank	Apparatus				Total	Rank
Athlete	Event	V	UB	BB	F	Total	Rank	V	UB	BB	F	Total	Rank
Ophir Shmuely	Individual all-around	12.800	12.300	11.866	12.633	49.599	10 Q	12.800	12.933	11.666	10.433	47.832	13

Boys

Athlete	Event	Qualification								Final							
Athlete	Event	Apparatus						Total	Rank	Apparatus						Total	Rank
Athlete	Event	F	PH	R	V	PB	HB	Total	Rank	F	PH	R	V	PB	HB	Total	Rank
Tomer Tirosh	Individual all-around	12.600	12.266	11.866	12.233	11.466	12.266	72.697	18 Q	12.466	10.800	11.700	12.166	11.566	11.933	70.631	16

Mixed

Athlete	Event	Round	Apparatus						Total	Rank
Athlete	Event	Round	FB	PB	HB	UB	BB	FG	Total	Rank
Ophir Shmuely; Tomer Tirosh	Mixed team	Qualification	12.600	11.466	12.266	12.300	11.866	12.633	73.131	10 Q
Ophir Shmuely; Tomer Tirosh	Mixed team	1	12.533			12.800			25.333	7 Q
Ophir Shmuely; Tomer Tirosh	Mixed team	2		12.966				12.333	25.299	4 Q
Ophir Shmuely; Tomer Tirosh	Mixed team	Final/BM			11.866		12.500		24.366	3rd place, bronze medalist(s)

== Athletics ==
Israel entered two Athletes, one of each gender.

Athlete	Event	Heats		Final	
Athlete	Event	Result	Rank	Result	Rank
Ido Noam	Men 2000 metre steeplechase	—N/a		5:59.19	10
Hila Varsano	Women 400 metre hurdles	1:00.51	4 Q	1:00.19	4

== Boxing ==
Israel entered one boxer in the Men's under 65 kg category.

Athlete	Event	Preliminary	Quarterfinals	Semifinals	Final	
Athlete	Event	Opposition Result	Opposition Result	Opposition Result	Opposition Result	Rank
Artur Prohnevsky	Men -65 kg	Rocha (MEX); W 5–0	Mustea (MDA); W 5–0	Macias (ESP); W 5–0	Sakuno (JPN); L 1–4	2nd place, silver medalist(s)

== Fencing ==
Israel entered one fencer in the Men's épée.

Athlete	Event	Pool round		Round of 16	Quarterfinals	Semifinals	Final / BM	
Athlete	Event	Opposition Score	Seed	Opposition Score	Opposition Score	Opposition Score	Opposition Score	Rank
Mordechai Lachman	Men épée	Caldito (PAN) W 5–2; Shan (CAN) L 2–4; Aime (MRI) W 5–0; Zahran (DOM)W 5–2; Diop (SEN) W 5–3; Rađenović (SRB) W 5–2	2	Bye	Van Laecke (BEL); L 14–15	Did not advance		6

== Judo ==
Israel entered one Judoka in the Men's under 66 kg category.

Athlete	Event	Round of 16	Quarterfinals	Semifinals	Repechage		Final / BM	Rank
Athlete	Event	Round of 16	Quarterfinals	Semifinals	Quarterfinals	Semifinals	Final / BM	Rank
Athlete	Event	Opposition Result	Opposition Result	Opposition Result	Opposition Result	Opposition Result	Opposition Result	Rank
Itamar Cohen	Men -66 kg	Bye	Gbingbehi (FRA); L 0–1	Did not advance	Pinto (MOZ); W 101–0	Carvallo (ARG); L 0–1	Did not advance	7

== Sailing ==
Israel entered one Windsurfer.

Athlete	Event	Race															Total score	Net score	Rank
Athlete	Event	1	2	3	4	5	6	7	8	9	10	11	12	13	14	15	Total score	Net score	Rank
Noa Bendat	Women Techno 293	9	7	11	12	~~15~~	~~16~~	8	11	11	9	11	14	12	~~19~~	Cancelled	165	115	12

== Swimming ==
Israel entered one Swimmer.

Athlete	Event	Heat		Final	
Athlete	Event	Time	Rank	Time	Rank
Ofir Simcha	Women 50 m backstroke	29.84	9 R	Did not advance	
Ofir Simcha	Women 100 m backstroke	1:03.80	6 Q	1:02.81	5
Ofir Simcha	Women 200 m backstroke	2:18.18	2 Q	2:17.44	3rd place, bronze medalist(s)
Ofir Simcha	Women 200 m individual medley	2:27.52	5 Q	2:23.16	4
