= Germany at the 2026 Summer Youth Olympics =

- Flag of Germany
- IOC code: GER
- NOC: German Olympic Sports Confederation
- Website: www.dosb.de

in Dakar, Senegal October 31, 2026 – November 13, 2026
- Competitors: 50 in 17 sports
- Flag bearers: Jolina Reinhold & Filo Wüst
- Medals: Gold 2 Silver 2 Bronze 3 Total 7

Summer Youth Olympics appearances
- 2010; 2014; 2018; 2026

Germany is scheduled to compete at the 2026 Summer Youth Olympics in Dakar, Senegal from October 31 to November 13, 2026. This will mark Germany's fourth appearance at the Youth Olympics, after making its debut in 2010.

== Medalists ==
Medal	Name	Sport	Event	Date
Gold	Jolina Reinhold	Judo	Women's –63 kg	2 November
Gold	Luna Fellinger	Taekwondo	Women's –63 kg	10 November
Silver	Carolina Guerra Gonzalez	Coastal rowing	Women's solo	3 November
Silver	Lasse Hüper; Filo Wüst	Beach volleyball	Men's tournament	4 November
Bronze	Mia Zhuo	Wushu	Women's taijiquan combined	3 November
Bronze	Rodney Agyeman; Béla Doleviczényi; Philip Grothe; Elias Köppen	3x3 basketball	Men's tournament	9 November
Bronze	Nikolai Sparre	Taekwondo	Men's –63 kg	10 November

== Competitors ==
The following is the list of number of competitors participating at the Games per sport/discipline.

Sport	Boys	Girls	Total
3x3 basketball	4	0	4
Archery	1	1	2
Artistic gymnastics	3	1	4
Badminton	1	0	1
Beach handball	10	0	10
Beach volleyball	2	0	2
Beach wrestling	0	1	1
Boxing	0	1	1
Breaking	0	1	1
Coastal rowing	1	1	2
Fencing	1	0	1
Judo	0	1	1
Rugby sevens	12	0	12
Table tennis	1	1	2
Taekwondo	2	2	4
Triathlon	0	1	1
Wushu	0	1	1
Total	38	12	50

== 3x3 basketball ==
Germany qualified a boys' team.

Summary

Team	Event	Group stage			Quarterfinal	Semifinal	Final / BM	
Team	Event	Opposition Score	Opposition Score	Rank	Opposition Score	Opposition Score	Opposition Score	Rank
Germany under-18 men's team	Men's tournament	Ivory Coast; W 19–16	Solomon Islands; W 21–4	1 Q	Puerto Rico; W 21–14	Senegal; L 15–16	Latvia; W 21–17	3rd place, bronze medalist(s)

=== Men's tournament ===
Team roster

- Rodney Agyeman
- Béla Doleviczényi
- Philip Grothe
- Elias Köppen

== Archery ==
Germany entered two archers, one of each gender.

Athlete	Event	Ranking round		Round of 32	Round of 16	Quarterfinals	Semifinals	Final / BM	
Athlete	Event	Score	Seed	Opposition Score	Opposition Score	Opposition Score	Opposition Score	Opposition Score	Rank
Johann Conrad	Men's individual	668	12	Gómez (COL); W 7–3	Lee (KOR); L 0–6	Did not advance			
Merle Edlich	Women's individual	657	9	Golovanevski (ISR); W 7–1	Martini (AUS); L 4–6	Did not advance			
Johann Conrad; Merle Edlich	Mixed team	1325	7 Q	—N/a	Japan; L 1–5	Did not advance			

== Artistic gymnastics ==
Boys
Team

Athlete	Event	Qualification								Final							
Athlete	Event	Apparatus						Total	Rank	Apparatus						Total	Rank
Athlete	Event	F	PH	R	V	PB	HB	Total	Rank	F	PH	R	V	PB	HB	Total	Rank
Zénó Csuka	Team	12.366	12.366	~~11.633~~	13.400	11.300	~~11.166~~	72.231	20 q	—N/a	11.833	—N/a	13.266	12.066	—N/a	—N/a	
Kimi Köhnlein	Team	~~11.966~~	~~10.733~~	12.433	13.600	~~10.600~~	12.133	71.465	26	13.066	—N/a	12.200	13.233	—N/a	12.333	—N/a	
Andrei Mihai	Team	12.366	13.066	11.900	~~13.166~~	12.066	12.600	75.164	9 Q	12.333	13.166	11.333	—N/a	11.600	12.566	—N/a	
Total	Team	24.732	25.342	24.333	27.000	23.366	24.733	149.596	5 Q	25.399	24.999	23.533	26.499	23.666	24.899	148.995	4

Individual

Athlete	Event	Qualification								Final							
Athlete	Event	Apparatus						Total	Rank	Apparatus						Total	Rank
Athlete	Event	F	PH	R	V	PB	HB	Total	Rank	F	PH	R	V	PB	HB	Total	Rank
Zeno Csuka	All-around	See team results above								11.466	11.933	11.300	13.300	12.700	11.400	72.099	13
Andrei Mihai	All-around	See team results above								8.866	11.733	11.700	11.633	12.300	12.066	68.298	18

Girls
Individual

Athlete	Event	Qualification						Final					
Athlete	Event	Apparatus				Total	Rank	Apparatus				Total	Rank
Athlete	Event	V	UB	BB	F	Total	Rank	V	UB	BB	F	Total	Rank
Luna Zimmermann	All-around	12.933	10.433	10.333	12.566	46.265	29	Did not advance					

Mixed team

Athlete	Event	Qualification							Final							
Athlete	Event	Apparatus					Total	Rank	Round	Apparatus					Total	Rank
Athlete	Event	F	PB	HB	UB	BB	Total	Rank	Round	F	PB	HB	UB	BB	Total	Rank
Luna Zimmermann	Mixed team	12.566	—N/a		10.433	10.333	33.332	—N/a	Did not advance							
Zeno Csuka; Andrei Mihai	Mixed team	12.366	12.066	12.600	—N/a		37.032	—N/a	Did not advance							
Total	Mixed team	22.799	12.066	12.600	10.433	10.333	70.364	15	Did not advance							

== Badminton ==
Athlete	Event	Group stage				Quarter-final	Semi-final	Final / BM	
Athlete	Event	Opposition Score	Opposition Score	Opposition Score	Rank	Opposition Score	Opposition Score	Opposition Score	Rank
Lovis Deters	Men's singles	Park (KOR); L (14–21, 17–21)	El-Saban (EGY); W (21–17, 21–13)	Neelam (AUS); L (13–21, 14–21)	3	Did not advance			

== Beach handball ==
Germany qualified a boys' team.

Team	Event	Group stage				Quarterfinal	Semifinal	Gold medal match	
Team	Event	Opposition Score	Opposition Score	Opposition Score	Rank	Opposition Score	Opposition Score	Opposition Score	Rank
Germany under-18 men's team	Men's tournament	Thailand; W 2–0	Cook Islands; W 2–0	Tunisia; W 2–0	1	Puerto Rico; W 2–0	Senegal; W 2–1	Brazil	

=== Boys' tournament ===
Team roster

- Thure Bielfeldt
- Dave Biyah
- Tayo Finnberg Rodriguez
- Nikolas Knipping
- Mads Krüger
- Lennart Otte
- Tim Perse
- Lenn Reinhard
- Luuk Seibert
- Peter Szabady

Group play

All times are local (UTC+0).

Pos	Team	Pld	W	L	Pts	PW	PL	PD	GF	GA	GD
1	Cook Islands	0	0	0	0	0	0	0	0	0	0
2	Germany	0	0	0	0	0	0	0	0	0	0
3	Thailand	0	0	0	0	0	0	0	0	0	0
4	Tunisia	0	0	0	0	0	0	0	0	0	0

First match(es) will be played: unknown. Source:
Rules for classification: 1) Points; 2) Head-to-head points; 3) Head-to-head period difference; 4) Head-to-head goal point difference; 5) Head-to-head number of plus goal points; 6) Period difference; 7) Number of plus periods; 8) Goal point difference; 9) Number of plus goal points; 10) Draw.

8 November 2026; 10:20	Germany	v	Thailand	Saly Beach Court 2

8 November 2026; 15:50	Cook Islands	v	Germany	Saly Beach Centre Court

9 November 2026; 10:00	Germany	v	Tunisia	Saly Beach Court 2

== Beach volleyball ==
Athletes	Event	Preliminary round				Round of 16	Quarterfinal	Semifinal	Final	
Athletes	Event	Opposition Score	Opposition Score	Opposition Score	Rank	Opposition Score	Opposition Score	Opposition Score	Opposition Score	Rank
Lasse Hüper; Filo Wüst	Men's	Yasser / Taghdouini (MAR); W 2–0	Sinclair / Steinkopff (NAM); W 2–0	Sulaiman / Kaniasie (SLE); W 2–0	1 Q	Justice / Daniel (GHA); W 2–1	Amir / Amin (IRI); W 2–0	Bruno Fellipe / Gabriel (BRA); W 2–0	Hohenauer / Poinstingl (AUT); L 1–2	2nd place, silver medalist(s)

== Beach wrestling ==
Athlete	Event	Group Stage				Semifinal	Final / BM	
Athlete	Event	Opposition Result	Opposition Result	Opposition Result	Rank	Opposition Result	Opposition Result	Rank
Mia Bauer	Women's –75 kg	Taniya (IND); L 1–3	Väster (EST); W 3–1	Karavanou (GRE); W w/o	2	Did not advance		

== Boxing ==
Germany will enter one girl.

Athlete	Event	Round of 16	Quarterfinals	Semifinals	Final	
Athlete	Event	Opposition Result	Opposition Result	Opposition Result	Opposition Result	Rank
Lorin Sayim	Women's bantamweight	Bye	Chakamanova (UZB); L 0–5	Did not advance		

== Breaking ==
Germany qualified one B-Girl.

Athlete	Nickname	Event	Pre-selection		Round-robin				Quarterfinal	Semifinal	Final / BM	
Athlete	Nickname	Event	Points	Rank	Opposition Result	Opposition Result	Opposition Result	Rank	Opposition Result	Opposition Result	Opposition Result	Rank
Melina Fernández	Melkez	B-Girls	74.8	4	Babarro (ESP); L 0–2	Song (KOR); L 0–2	Ennadre (MAR); D 1–1	4	Did not advance			

== Coastal rowing ==
Athlete	Event	Qualification		Round of 16	Quarterfinal	Semifinal	Final	
Athlete	Event	Time	Rank	Opposition Time	Opposition Time	Opposition Time	Opposition Time	Rank
Johann Meyer	Men's solo	2:44.56	5 Q	Žižka (CZE); L 2:31.43	Did not advance			
Carolina Guerra Gonzalez	Women's solo	3:06.29	8 Q	Grove (USA); W 2:48.11	Brendle (SUI); W 2:43.95	Zavadilová (CZE); W 2:36.89	Liu (CHN); L 2:53.88	2nd place, silver medalist(s)
Johann Meyer; Carolina Guerra Gonzalez	Mixed double sculls	2:35.86	1 Q	Thailand; W 2:13.42	Austria; L 2:13.54	Did not advance		

== Fencing ==
Athlete	Event	Pool Round	Seed	Round of 16	Quarterfinals	Semifinals	Final / BM	Rank
Athlete	Event	Opposition Score	Seed	Opposition Score	Opposition Score	Opposition Score	Opposition Score	Rank
Severin Spielberg	Men's sabre	Urushadze (GEO) W 5–4; Meitsov (BUL) W 5–4; Yembele (COD) W 5–0; Al-Duaij (KUW) W 5–2; El Ghanja (TUN) W 5–0	2	Bye	Berrak (TUR); L 14–15	Did not advance		

== Judo ==
Athlete	Event	Round of 16	Quarterfinals	Semifinals	Repechage 1	Repechage 2	Final	
Athlete	Event	Opposition Result	Opposition Result	Opposition Result	Opposition Result	Opposition Result	Opposition Result	Rank
Jolina Reinhold	Women's –63 kg	Bye	Chayeb (LBN); W 100–0	Kyialbekova (KGZ); W 1–0	—N/a		Darjada (IND); W 100–0	1st place, gold medalist(s)

== Rugby sevens ==
Germany qualified a boys' team.

Team	Event	Group stage				Classification match	Fifth place match	
Team	Event	Opposition Score	Opposition Score	Opposition Score	Rank	Opposition Score	Opposition Score	Rank
Germany boys'	Men's tournament	Canada; L 10–17	Senegal; W 31–12	South Africa; L 7–34	3	Uganda; W 22–0	Japan; W 26–19	5

=== Boys' tournament ===
Team roster

- Andre Brauner
- Aaron Engels
- Rémy Folnovic
- Marius Gifhorn
- Felix Grothe
- Max Lane
- Felix May
- Joschi May
- Raphael Moutsinga
- Tillman Niederberger
- Oscar Schmekel
- Moritz Thonfeld

== Table tennis ==
Athlete	Event	Group Stage				Round of 32	Round of 16	Quarterfinal	Semifinal	Final	
Athlete	Event	Opposition Result	Opposition Result	Opposition Result	Rank	Opposition Result	Opposition Result	Opposition Result	Opposition Result	Opposition Result	Rank
Jonas Rinderer	Men's singles	Li (CHN); L 0–3	Goudjil (ALG); W 3–1	Öçal (TUR); L 2–3	3	—N/a	Did not advance				
Koharu Itagaki	Women's singles	Han (NZL); W 3–1	Leal (POR); W 3–2	Ramírez (CHI); W 3–1	1 Q	—N/a	Kodet (CZE); W 4–2	Chen (TPE); L 0–4	Did not advance		
Jonas Rinderer; Koharu Itagaki	Mixed doubles	—N/a				Istrate / Băiașu (ROU); L 0–3	Did not advance				

== Taekwondo ==
Germany has qualified two boys and two girls.

Athlete	Event	Round of 16	Quarterfinals	Semifinals	Repechage	Final / BM	
Athlete	Event	Opposition Result	Opposition Result	Opposition Result	Opposition Result	Opposition Result	Rank
Nikolai Sparre	Men's –63 kg	Bye	Al-Mohammedsaleh (KSA); W 2–0	Al-Zawahra (JOR); L 0–2	—N/a	Did not advance	3rd place, bronze medalist(s)
Christos Papathanasiou	Men's –73 kg	Bye	Al-Dahamsheh (JOR); L 0–2	Did not advance			
Damija Hadzic	Women's –55 kg	Herrera (MEX); L 0–2	Did not advance				
Luna Fellinger	Women's –63 kg	Mondragon (MEX); W 2–1	Jami (AFG); W 2–0	Işık (TUR); W 2–0	—N/a	Goltapeh (IRI); W 2–0	1st place, gold medalist(s)
Luna Fellinger; Damija Hadzic; Christos Papathanasiou; Nikolai Sparre	Mixed team	—N/a	Tunisia; W 2–0	Turkey; L 0–2	Senegal; W 2–0	Mexico; L 1–2	4

== Triathlon ==
Germany qualified one female athlete.

Athlete	Event	Time						Rank
Athlete	Event	Swim (750 m)	Trans 1	Bike (20 km)	Trans 2	Run (5 km)	Total	Rank
Josefine Doseth	Women's	9:46	0:24	30:18	0:27	20:10	1:01:05	7

== Wushu ==
Athlete	Event	Preliminary						Final					
Athlete	Event	Event 1		Event 2		Total		Event 1		Event 2		Total	
Athlete	Event	Result	Rank	Result	Rank	Result	Rank	Result	Rank	Result	Rank	Result	Rank
Mia Zhuo	Women's taijiquan	9.160	5	9.200	4	18.360	4 Q	9.266	2	9.216	5	18.482	3rd place, bronze medalist(s)
