= Archery at the 2026 Summer Youth Olympics – Men's individual =

Archery event at the 2026 Summer Youth Olympics

Men's individual at the IV Summer Youth Olympic Games
- Venue: Abdoulaye Wade Stadium
- Dates: 6–8 November
- Competitors: 32 from 32 nations

Medalists
1st place, gold medalist(s)		Maël Lamouret	France
2nd place, silver medalist(s)		Chen Pin-an	Chinese Taipei
3rd place, bronze medalist(s)		Lee Ji-ho	South Korea

The men's individual archery competition at the 2026 Summer Youth Olympics is being held from 6 to 8 November 2026 at the Abdoulaye Wade Stadium in Dakar, Senegal. The ranking round took place on 6 November, followed by the elimination rounds.

The official competition documents refer to the event as the men's individual event.

== Results ==
=== Ranking round ===
The ranking round was held on 6 November 2026. The 32 archers were ranked according to their scores and seeded into the elimination bracket.

Rank	Archer	Nation	10s	Xs	Score
1	Chen Pin-an	Chinese Taipei	42	15	688
2	Ismail Ezzeldin	Egypt	44	11	688
3	Maёl Lamouret	France	44	11	687
4	Samo Vrbec	Slovenia	37	20	685
5	Lee Ji-ho	South Korea	36	10	683
6	Daviti Basiladze	Georgia	36	12	680
7	Khalifa Al-Kaabi	United Arab Emirates	36	8	677
8	Noé Wenger	Switzerland	34	10	675
9	Matija Šmaguc	Croatia	34	13	674
10	Brock Penna	Australia	33	15	673
11	Muhammet Musab Gülay	Turkey	33	10	673
12	Johann Conrad	Germany	33	7	668
13	Aarya Arun	United States	31	12	666
14	Takara Daimon	Japan	28	8	666
15	Hleb Akunevich	Belarus	31	10	663
16	Diego Góngora	Mexico	27	12	661
17	Yuval Raz	Israel	26	8	653
18	Oliver Soták	Slovakia	24	6	653
19	Rodrigo Palomo	Spain	23	5	651
20	Bekzod Boborajabov	Uzbekistan	22	5	650
21	Nicolás Gómez Meneses	Colombia	18	4	641
22	Archie Christopher	Great Britain	24	11	639
23	Mikołaj Stankiewicz	Poland	18	2	637
24	Thornton Wallberg	New Zealand	22	11	635
25	Niccolo Mazzuoli	Italy	22	8	633
26	Yugveer Bissessur	Mauritius	19	6	630
27	Yashveer Bains	Canada	16	7	627
28	Benjamin Oosthuizen	South Africa	7	1	613
29	Mohamed Hedi Benhamed	Tunisia	19	6	605
30	Kouassi Chadrac Yao	Ivory Coast	11	3	603
31	Mory Konaté	Guinea	6	1	577
32	Marouane Guendouzi	Algeria	2	0	558

=== Elimination rounds ===
The 32 archers qualified for the elimination rounds according to their ranking-round positions. The elimination bracket was published on 6 November 2026. The first elimination round was scheduled for 7 November, with the quarterfinals and men's finals scheduled for 8 November.

==== Medal matches ====
Semi-finals
1	Chen Pin-an (TPE)	6	30	27	30	28	30
5	Lee Ji-ho (KOR)	4	29	29	27	29	29
3	Maël Lamouret (FRA)	6	28	29	29	29
2	Ismail Ezzeldin (EGY)	2	28	28	29	28

Gold medal match
1	Chen Pin-an (TPE)	4	29	28	29	28	28
3	Maël Lamouret (FRA)	6	30	28	28	30	28
Bronze medal match
5	Lee Ji-ho (KOR)	6	29	29	30	28
2	Ismail Ezzeldin (EGY)	2	29	28	27	28

==== Section 1 ====
Round of 32
1	Chen P-a (TPE)	6	28	27	28
32	M Guendouzi (ALG)	0	23	21	24
17	Y Raz (ISR)	6^{10}	27	29	29	24	29
16	D Góngora (MEX)	5^{8}	28	29	27	28	26
9	M Šmaguc (CRO)	6	29	28	29
24	T Wallberg (NZL)	0	25	27	27
25	N Mazzuoli (ITA)	2	26	26	27	28
8	N Wenger (SUI)	6	28	28	26	30

Round of 16
1	Chen P-a (TPE)	6	28	29	29
17	Y Raz (ISR)	0	27	28	28
9	M Šmaguc (CRO)	6^{10}	26	29	30	27	29
8	N Wenger (SUI)	5^{9}	28	30	27	27	28

Quarter-finals
1	Chen P-a (TPE)	6	28	26	29	29	30
9	M Šmaguc (CRO)	4	30	27	28	27	28

==== Section 2 ====
Round of 32
5	Lee J-h (KOR)	7	26	30	28	30
28	B Oosthuizen (RSA)	1	23	27	28	26
21	N Gómez Meneses (COL)	3	28	27	25	29	28
12	J Conrad (GER)	7	28	28	27	26	29
13	A Arun (USA)	7	25	29	29	29
20	B Boborajabov (UZB)	1	25	27	26	28
29	M H Benhamed (TUN)	0	26	23	22
4	S Vrbec (SLO)	6	27	28	27

Round of 16
5	Lee J-h (KOR)	6	29	29	29
12	J Conrad (GER)	0	20	28	26
13	A Arun (USA)	6	25	30	29	29
4	S Vrbec (SLO)	2	26	27	27	28

Quarter-finals
5	Lee J-h (KOR)	6	28	28	29	29	29
13	A Arun (USA)	4	27	29	29	28	29

==== Section 3 ====
Round of 32
3	M Lamouret (FRA)	7	28	28	28	28
30	K C Yao (CIV)	1	25	17	28	27
19	R Palomom (ESP)	6^{10}	28	22	27	24	28
14	T Daimon (JPN)	5^{9}	23	28	27	27	25
11	M M Gülay (TUR)	6	27	25	29
22	A Christopher (GBR)	0	26	24	26
27	Y Bains (CAN)	6^{9+}	28	23	25	28	29
6	D Basiladze (GEO)	5^{9}	27	29	27	28	28

Round of 16
3	M Lamouret (FRA)	6	29	28	28	29	28
19	R Palomom (ESP)	4	25	28	30	29	25
11	M M Gülay (TUR)	6	27	26	28	29	28
27	Y Bains (CAN)	4	28	25	29	26	26

Quarter-finals
3	M Lamouret (FRA)	7	29	29	29	30
11	M M Gülay (TUR)	1	28	29	17	26

==== Section 4 ====
Round of 32
7	K Al-Kaabi (UAE)	6	28	27	28	27
26	Y Bissessur (MRI)	2	25	28	27	24
23	M Stankiewicz (POL)	0	25	23	24
10	B Penna (AUS)	6	28	25	29
15	H Akunevich (BLR)	7	23	28	28	28	28
18	O Soták (SVK)	3	27	26	26	28	27
31	M Konaté (GUI)	0	22	22	24
2	I Ezzeldin (EGY)	6	26	27	28

Round of 16
7	K Al-Kaabi (UAE)	4	26	26	30	30	27
10	B Penna (AUS)	6	27	27	28	27	28
15	H Akunevich (BLR)	2	29	29	28	27
2	I Ezzeldin (EGY)	6	29	29	29	29

Quarter-finals
10	B Penna (AUS)	3	29	30	27	27	28
2	I Ezzeldin (EGY)	7	29	27	29	29	29
