= Badminton at the 2026 Summer Youth Olympics – Men's singles =

Badminton championships

Boys' singles at the IV Summer Youth Olympic Games
- Venue: Dakar Arena
- Dates: 1 – 5 November
- Competitors: 31 from 31 nations

Medalists
1st place, gold medalist(s)		Riyan Malhan	United Arab Emirates
2nd place, silver medalist(s)		Mady Sow	France
3rd place, bronze medalist(s)		Hong Tianyue	China

The men's singles badminton tournament at the 2026 Summer Youth Olympics was held between 1–5 November at the Dakar Arena. The draw was announced at 30 October 2026.

== Seeds ==
1. Mady Sow (FRA) (silver medal)
2. Dev Ruparelia (IND) (quarter-finals)
3. Riyan Malhan (UAE) (gold medal)
4. Chuang Yung-neng (TPE) (quarter-finals)
5. Hong Tianyue (CHN) (bronze medal)
6. Rithik Rasamsetti (USA) (quarter-finals)
7. Punnatat Prempunpong (THA) (quarter-finals)
8. Park Jung-bin (KOR) (fourth place)

== Groups ==
Group A	Group B	Group C	Group D
Mady Sow (FRA); Teodor Mitev (BUL); Aleksa Radovanović (SRB); Tony Yu (NZL)	Rithik Rasamsetti (USA); Amirali Ahmadloo (IRI); Obapomba Adu-Mintah (GHA); Leo Douce (MRI)	Chuang Yung-neng (TPE); Oussama Keddou (ALG); Misha Bredell (RSA); Berkay Ceyhan (TUR)	Park Jung-bin (KOR); Omar Elsaban (EGY); Om Neelam (AUS); Lovis Deters (GER)
Group E	Group F	Group G	Group H
Punnatat Prempunpong (THA); Zack Ng (SGP); Fabricio Rodríguez (VEN)	Riyan Malhan (UAE); Lucas Lee (MAS); Ioannis Sarougiannidis (GRE); Felus Ding (SWE)	Hong Tianyue (CHN); Klecivan Silva (BRA); Axel Boesen (DEN); Rayhan Pandu Aksara (INA)	Dev Ruparelia (IND); Shaurya Gullaiya (CAN); Petr Bříza (CZE); Cheikh Bamba (SEN)

== Results ==
=== Group A ===
Pos	Team	Pld	W	L	GF	GA	GD	PF	PA	PD	Pts	Qualification
1	Mady Sow (FRA)	3	3	0	6	0	+6	126	52	+74	3	Quarter-finals
2	Teodor Mitev (BUL)	3	2	1	4	2	+2	109	92	+17	2	
3	Aleksa Radovanović (SRB)	3	1	2	2	4	−2	86	122	−36	1	
4	Tony Yu (NZL)	3	0	3	0	6	−6	72	127	−55	0	

First match(es) will be played: 1 November 2026. Source:

Date	Time	Player 1	Score	Player 2	Game 1	Game 2	Game 3	Report
1 November	09:00	Teodor Mitev (Bulgaria)	2–0	(Serbia) Aleksa Radovanović	21–10	21–17		Report
1 November	09:00	Mady Sow (France)	2–0	(New Zealand) Tony Yu	21–5	21–6		Report
2 November	09:00	Teodor Mitev (Bulgaria)	2–0	(New Zealand) Tony Yu	21–12	21–11		Report
2 November	09:00	Mady Sow (France)	2–0	(Serbia) Aleksa Radovanović	21–9	21–7		Report
3 November	09:00	Mady Sow (France)	2–0	(Bulgaria) Teodor Mitev	21–16	21–9		Report
3 November	09:00	Aleksa Radovanović (Serbia)	2–0	(New Zealand) Tony Yu	21–18	22–20		Report

=== Group B ===
Pos	Team	Pld	W	L	GF	GA	GD	PF	PA	PD	Pts	Qualification
1	Rithik Rasamsetti (USA)	3	3	0	6	0	+6	126	78	+48	3	Quarter-finals
2	Amirali Ahmadloo (IRI)	3	2	1	4	2	+2	122	86	+36	2	
3	Obapomba Adu-Mintah (GHA)	3	1	2	2	5	−3	99	142	−43	1	
4	Leo Douce (MRI)	3	0	3	1	6	−5	107	148	−41	0	

First match(es) will be played: 1 November 2026. Source:

Date	Time	Player 1	Score	Player 2	Game 1	Game 2	Game 3	Report
1 November	09:00	Rithik Rasamsetti (United States)	2–0	(Mauritius) Leo Douce	21–14	21–8		Report
1 November	09:45	Amirali Ahmadloo (Iran)	2–0	(Ghana) Obapomba Adu-Mintah	21–9	21–8		Report
2 November	09:00	Rithik Rasamsetti (United States)	2–0	(Ghana) Obapomba Adu-Mintah	21–14	21–8		Report
2 November	09:45	Amirali Ahmadloo (Iran)	2–0	(Mauritius) Leo Douce	21–8	21–19		Report
3 November	09:00	Rithik Rasamsetti (United States)	2–0	(Iran) Amirali Ahmadloo	21–19	21–19		Report
3 November	09:45	Obapomba Adu-Mintah (Ghana)	2–1	(Mauritius) Leo Douce	21–23	22–20	21–15	Report

=== Group C ===
Pos	Team	Pld	W	L	GF	GA	GD	PF	PA	PD	Pts	Qualification
1	Chuang Yung-neng (TPE)	3	3	0	6	0	+6	126	64	+62	3	Quarter-finals
2	Berkay Ceyhan (TUR)	3	2	1	4	2	+2	112	104	+8	2	
3	Oussama Keddou (ALG)	3	1	2	2	4	−2	108	113	−5	1	
4	Misha Bredell (RSA)	3	0	3	0	6	−6	61	126	−65	0	

First match(es) will be played: 1 November 2026. Source:

Date	Time	Player 1	Score	Player 2	Game 1	Game 2	Game 3	Report
1 November	09:45	Chuang Yung-neng (Chinese Taipei)	2–0	(Turkey) Berkay Ceyhan	21–12	21–14		Report
1 November	09:45	Oussama Keddou (Algeria)	2–0	(South Africa) Misha Bredell	21–17	21–10		Report
2 November	09:45	Chuang Yung-neng (Chinese Taipei)	2–0	(South Africa) Misha Bredell	21–5	21–7		Report
2 November	09:45	Oussama Keddou (Algeria)	0–2	(Turkey) Berkay Ceyhan	21–23	19–21		Report
3 November	09:45	Misha Bredell (South Africa)	0–2	(Turkey) Berkay Ceyhan	11–21	11–21		Report
3 November	09:45	Chuang Yung-neng (Chinese Taipei)	2–1	(Algeria) Oussama Keddou	21–14	21–12		Report

=== Group D ===
Pos	Team	Pld	W	L	GF	GA	GD	PF	PA	PD	Pts	Qualification
1	Park Jung-bin (KOR)	3	3	0	6	0	+6	126	82	+44	3	Quarter-finals
2	Om Neelam (AUS)	3	2	1	4	2	+2	114	89	+25	2	
3	Lovis Deters (GER)	3	1	2	2	4	−2	100	114	−14	1	
4	Omar Elsaban (EGY)	3	0	3	0	6	−6	71	126	−55	0	

First match(es) will be played: 1 November 2026. Source:

Date	Time	Player 1	Score	Player 2	Game 1	Game 2	Game 3	Report
1 November	10:30	Park Jung-bin (South Korea)	2–0	(Germany) Lovis Deters	21–14	21–17		Report
1 November	10:30	Omar Elsaban (Egypt)	0–2	(Australia) Om Neelam	7–21	13–21		Report
2 November	10:30	Park Jung-bin (South Korea)	2–0	(Australia) Om Neelam	21–15	21–15		Report
2 November	10:30	Omar Elsaban (Egypt)	0–2	(Germany) Lovis Deters	17–21	13–21		Report
3 November	10:30	Park Jung-bin (South Korea)	2–0	(Egypt) Omar Elsaban	21–11	21–10		Report
3 November	10:30	Om Neelam (Australia)	2–0	(Germany) Lovis Deters	21–13	21–14		Report

=== Group E ===
Pos	Team	Pld	W	L	GF	GA	GD	PF	PA	PD	Pts	Qualification
1	Punnatat Prempunpong (THA)	2	2	0	4	0	+4	84	34	+50	2	Quarter-finals
2	Zack Ng (SGP)	2	1	1	2	2	0	68	48	+20	1	
3	Fabricio Rodríguez (VEN)	2	0	2	0	4	−4	14	84	−70	0	

First match(es) will be played: 1 November 2026. Source:

Date	Time	Player 1	Score	Player 2	Game 1	Game 2	Game 3	Report
1 November	14:30	Punnatat Prempunpong (Thailand)	2–0	(Venezuela) Fabricio Rodríguez	21–4	21–4		Report
2 November	14:30	Zack Ng (Singapore)	2–0	(Venezuela) Fabricio Rodríguez	21–4	21–2		Report
3 November	14:30	Punnatat Prempunpong (Thailand)	2–0	(Singapore) Zack Ng	21–16	21–10		Report

=== Group F ===
Pos	Team	Pld	W	L	GF	GA	GD	PF	PA	PD	Pts	Qualification
1	Riyan Malhan (UAE)	3	3	0	6	0	+6	126	72	+54	3	Quarter-finals
2	Lucas Lee (MAS)	3	2	1	4	3	+1	125	100	+25	2	
3	Felus Ding (SWE)	3	1	2	3	4	−1	59	126	−67	1	
4	Ioannis Sarougiannidis (GRE)	3	0	3	0	6	−6	115	127	−12	0	

First match(es) will be played: 1 November 2026. Source:

Date	Time	Player 1	Score	Player 2	Game 1	Game 2	Game 3	Report
1 November	14:30	Riyan Malhan (United Arab Emirates)	2–0	(Sweden) Felus Ding	21–14	21–14		Report
1 November	15:15	Lucas Lee (Malaysia)	2–0	(Greece) Ioannis Sarougiannidis	21–7	21–6		Report
2 November	14:30	Riyan Malhan (United Arab Emirates)	2–0	(Greece) Ioannis Sarougiannidis	21–13	21–5		Report
2 November	15:15	Lucas Lee (Malaysia)	2–1	(Sweden) Felus Ding	21–11	15–21	21–13	Report
3 November	15:15	Ioannis Sarougiannidis (Greece)	0–2	(Sweden) Felus Ding	15–21	13–21		Report
3 November	15:15	Riyan Malhan (United Arab Emirates)	2–0	(Malaysia) Lucas Lee	21–15	21–11		Report

=== Group G ===
Pos	Team	Pld	W	L	GF	GA	GD	PF	PA	PD	Pts	Qualification
1	Hong Tianyue (CHN)	2	2	0	4	1	+3	104	87	+17	2	Quarter-finals
2	Rayhan Pandu Aksara (INA)	2	1	1	3	2	+1	99	87	+12	1	
3	Axel Boesen (DEN)	2	0	2	0	4	−4	55	84	−29	0	
4	Klecivan Silva (BRA)	0	0	0	0	0	0	0	0	0	0	Withdrew

First match(es) will be played: 1 November 2026. Source:

Date	Time	Player 1	Score	Player 2	Game 1	Game 2	Game 3	Report
1 November	15:15	Hong Tianyue (China)	2–1	(Indonesia) Rayhan Pandu Aksara	21–19	20–22	21–16	Report
1 November	15:15	Klecivan Silva (Brazil)	~~0–2~~	(Denmark) Axel Boesen	~~17–21~~	~~9–21~~		Report
2 November	15:15	Hong Tianyue (China)	2–0	(Denmark) Axel Boesen	21–11	21–19		Report
2 November	15:15	Klecivan Silva (Brazil)	~~0–2~~	(Indonesia) Rayhan Pandu Aksara	~~17–21~~	~~10–21~~		Report
3 November	15:15	Hong Tianyue (China)		(Brazil) Klecivan Silva				
3 November	16:00	Axel Boesen (Denmark)	0–2	(Indonesia) Rayhan Pandu Aksara	15–21	10–21		Report

=== Group H ===
Pos	Team	Pld	W	L	GF	GA	GD	PF	PA	PD	Pts	Qualification
1	UAE	0	0	0	0	0	0	0	0	0	0	Quarter-finals
2	MAS	0	0	0	0	0	0	0	0	0	0	
3	SWE	0	0	0	0	0	0	0	0	0	0	
4	GRE	0	0	0	0	0	0	0	0	0	0	

First match(es) will be played: 1 November 2026. Source:

Date	Time	Player 1	Score	Player 2	Game 1	Game 2	Game 3	Report
1 November	16:00	Dev Ruparelia (India)	2–0	(Senegal) Cheikh Bamba	21–9	21–3		Report
1 November	16:00	Shaurya Gullaiya (Canada)	2–0	(Czech Republic) Petr Bříza	21–15	21–12		Report
2 November	16:00	Dev Ruparelia (India)	2–0	(Czech Republic) Petr Bříza	21–13	21–16		Report
2 November	15:15	Shaurya Gullaiya (Canada)	2–0	(Senegal) Cheikh Bamba	21–11	21–1		Report
3 November	16:00	Petr Bříza (Czech Republic)	2–0	(Senegal) Cheikh Bamba	21–11	21–10		Report
3 November	16:00	Dev Ruparelia (India)	2–1	(Canada) Shaurya Gullaiya	23–25	21–19	21–11	Report

== Knockout stage ==
Quarterfinals; Wednesday, 4 November
1	Mady Sow (FRA)	21	21
6	Rithik Rasamsetti (USA)	18	12
4	Chuang Yung-neng (TPE)	18	15
8	Park Jung-bin (KOR)	21	21
7	Punnatat Prempunpong (THA)	14	15
3	Riyan Malhan (UAE)	21	21
5	Hong Tianyue (CHN)	21	21
2	Dev Ruparelia (IND)	22	10

Semifinals; Wednesday, 4 November
1	Mady Sow (FRA)	21	21
8	Park Jung-bin (KOR)	12	16
3	Riyan Malhan (UAE)	24	21
5	Hong Tianyue (CHN)	20	13

Final; Thursday, 5 November
1	Mady Sow (FRA)	17	18
3	Riyan Malhan (UAE)	21	21
Third place
8	Park Jung-bin (KOR)	17	12
5	Hong Tianyue (CHN)	21	21
