= Brazil at the 2026 Summer Youth Olympics =

- Flag of Brazil
- IOC code: BRA
- NOC: Brazilian Olympic Committee
- Website: www.cob.org.br

in Dakar, Senegal October 31, 2026 – November 13, 2026
- Competitors: 35 in 16 sports
- Flag bearers: Anna Brukhnova & Luiz Daniel Moura
- Medals Ranked 12th: Gold 3 Silver 3 Bronze 1 Total 7

Summer Youth Olympics appearances (overview)
- 2010; 2014; 2018; 2026

Brazil competed at the 2026 Summer Youth Olympics in Dakar, Senegal from October 31 to November 13, 2026. This marked Brazil's fourth appearance at the Youth Olympics, after making its debut in 2010.

Equestrian Anna Brukhnova and swimmer Luiz Daniel Moura served as the flag bearers for the opening ceremony.

== Competitors ==
The following is the list of number of competitors participating at the Games per sport/discipline.

Sport	Men	Women	Total
Archery	0	1	1
Artistic gymnastics	1	1	2
Athletics	4	3	7
Badminton	1	0	1
Beach handball	10	0	10
Beach volleyball	2	0	2
Beach wrestling	1	0	1
Boxing	0	1	1
Coastal rowing	1	0	1
Equestrian	0	1	1
Fencing	0	1	1
Judo	0	1	1
Skateboarding	0	1	1
Swimming	1	1	2
Table tennis	1	1	2
Taekwondo	0	1	1
Total	22	13	35

== Medalists ==
Medal	Name	Sport	Event	Date
Gold	Clarisse Vallim	Judo	Women's 78 kg	3 November
Gold	Pyetro Souza	Athletics	Men's shot put	9 November
Gold	Sara Campos	Boxing	Women's 57 kg	12 November
Silver	Duda Ribeiro	Skateboarding	Women's street	5 November
Silver	Ana Júlia Amaral	Swimming	Women's 200 m butterfly	6 November
Silver	Talisson Andrade; Tiago Azevedo; Giovani Brandão; Tulio Castro; André de Souza; José dos Santos; Luiz Ferreira; Diego Luna; Raphael Martins; Kaike Silveira	Beach handball	Men's tournament	13 November
Bronze	Ana Júlia Amaral	Swimming	Women's 100 m butterfly	1 November

== Archery ==
Brazil entered one female archer.

Women

Athlete	Event	Ranking Round		Round of 16	Quarterfinals	Semifinals	Final / BM	Rank
Athlete	Event	Score	Seed	Opposition Score	Opposition Score	Opposition Score	Opposition Score	Rank
Luiza Langone	Individual	565	32	Yenihayat (TUR); L 0–6	Did not advance			

== Artistic gymnastics ==
Brazil entered two gymnasts, one male and one female.

Men

Athlete	Event	Qualification								Final							
Athlete	Event	Apparatus						Total	Rank	Apparatus						Total	Rank
Athlete	Event	F	PH	R	V	PB	HB	Total	Rank	F	PH	R	V	PB	HB	Total	Rank
Matheus Fernandes	All-around	10.933	8.733	10.666	12.800	11.400	12.400	66.932	45	Did not advance							

Women

Athlete	Event	Qualification						Final					
Athlete	Event	Apparatus				Total	Rank	Apparatus				Total	Rank
Athlete	Event	V	UB	BB	F	Total	Rank	V	UB	BB	F	Total	Rank
Julie Costa	All-around	12.400	11.433	11.666	12.066	47.565	24	Did not advance					

Mixed team

Athlete	Event	Qualification							Final							
Athlete	Event	Apparatus					Total	Rank	Round	Apparatus					Total	Rank
Athlete	Event	F	PB	HB	UB	BB	Total	Rank	Round	F	PB	HB	UB	BB	Total	Rank
Julie Costa	Mixed team	12.066	—N/a		11.433	11.666	35.165	—N/a	Did not advance							
Matheus Fernandes	Mixed team	10.933	11.400	12.400	—N/a		34.733	—N/a	Did not advance							
Total	Mixed team	—N/a					69.898	17	Did not advance							

== Athletics ==
Brazil entered seven athletes, four male and three female.

=== Track & road events ===
Men

Athlete	Event	Semifinal		Final	
Athlete	Event	Result	Rank	Result	Rank
Kevin Tobias	400 m hurdles	52.94	6 Q	52.99	8

Women

Athlete	Event	Semifinal		Final	
Athlete	Event	Result	Rank	Result	Rank
Nicole Herdy	1500 m	—N/a		4:39.56	8
Melissa Gonçalves	100 m hurdles	14.22	8 Q	14.00	6
Larissa Schon	400 m hurdles	1:00.38	3 Q	1:00.63	5

=== Field events ===
Men

Athlete	Event	Final	
Athlete	Event	Distance	Rank
José Antonio Escobar	Hammer throw	63.30	5
Naftaly Magalhães	High jump	2.02	6
Pyetro Souza	Shot put	19.79	1st place, gold medalist(s)

== Badminton ==
Brazil entered one male athlete.

Men

Athlete	Event	Group stage				Quarterfinal	Semifinal	Final / BM	
Athlete	Event	Opposition Score	Opposition Score	Opposition Score	Rank	Opposition Score	Opposition Score	Opposition Score	Rank
Klecivan Silva	Singles	Boesen (DEN); L (17–21, 9–21)	Aksara (INA); L (17–21, 10–21)	Hong (CHN); Cancelled	WD	Did not advance			

== Beach handball ==
Brazil entered a team for the men's tournament.

Summary

Event	Group stage				Quarterfinals	5th–8th classification	Semifinals	Final / PG / BM	
Event	Opposition Result	Opposition Result	Opposition Result	Rank	Opposition Result	Opposition Result	Opposition Result	Opposition Result	Rank
Men's tournament	Puerto Rico; W 2–0	Senegal; W 2–1	Hungary; W 2–0	1 Q	Cook Islands; W 2–0	—N/a	Hungary; W 2–1	Germany; L 0–2	2nd place, silver medalist(s)

Roster

- Talisson Andrade
- Tiago Azevedo
- Giovani Brandão
- Tulio Castro
- André de Souza
- José dos Santos
- Luiz Ferreira
- Diego Luna
- Raphael Martins
- Kaike Silveira

== Beach volleyball ==
Brazil received a quota place for the men's tournament.

Summary

Team	Event	Group stage				Round of 16	Quarterfinals	Semifinals	Final / BM	
Team	Event	Opposition Result	Opposition Result	Opposition Result	Rank	Opposition Result	Opposition Result	Opposition Result	Opposition Result	Rank
Gabriel Campos; Bruno Souza	Men's tournament	Phillips / Mortensen (USA); W (22–20, 30–28)	Godoy / Vásquez (GUA); W (21–11, 21–16)	Santiago / Moisés (VEN); W (21–17, 19–21, 15–13)	1 Q	Kainesie / Sulaiman (SLE); W (21–15, 21–15)	Karlsen / Ringøen (NOR); W (21–18, 21–17)	Hüper / Wüst (GER); L (15–21, 18–21)	Edgar / Turner (AUS); L (8–21, 16–21)	4

== Beach wrestling ==
Brazil entered one male athlete.

Men

Team	Event	Group stage				Semifinals	Final / BM	
Team	Event	Opposition Result	Opposition Result	Opposition Result	Rank	Opposition Result	Opposition Result	Rank
Allan Beserra	–90 kg	Ghannam (MAR); W 3–0	Cacean (MDA); W 3–0	Kamrili (AZE); L 0–3	2 q	Mustafaev (GEO); L 0–3	Diouf (SEN); L 1–4	4

== Boxing ==
Brazil entered one female athlete in the −57 kg category.

Women

Athlete	Weight	Round of 16	Quarterfinals	Semifinals	Final	
Athlete	Weight	Opposition Result	Opposition Result	Opposition Result	Opposition Result	Rank
Sara Campos	–57 kg	Cabane (FRA); W 5–0	Golzadeh (IRI); W RSC	Kiss (HUN); W 5–0	Tursyngali (KAZ); W 4–1	1st place, gold medalist(s)

== Coastal rowing ==
Brazil entered one male rower.

Men

Athlete	Event	Time trial 1		Time trial 2		Round of 16	Quarterfinal	Semifinal	Final	
Athlete	Event	Time	Rank	Time	Rank	Opposition Time	Opposition Time	Opposition Time	Opposition Time	Rank
João Pedro França Silva	Solo	2:49.63	13	2:39.89	14	Did not advance				

== Equestrian ==
Brazil received a quota place as one of the four invited NOCs from South America.

Athlete	Horse	Event	Qualification								Final		
Athlete	Horse	Event	Round A			Round B			Total		Final		
Athlete	Horse	Event	Penalties	Time	Rank	Penalties	Time	Rank	Penalties	Rank	Penalties	Time	Rank
Anna Brukhnova	For Fun De Wasigny Z	Individual jumping	19	95.11	19	0	72.98	3	19	18 Q	4	82.32	16

== Fencing ==
Brazil entered one female athlete.

Women

Athlete	Event	Pool round		Round of 16	Quarterfinals	Semifinals	Final / BM	
Athlete	Event	Opposition Score	Seed	Opposition Score	Opposition Score	Opposition Score	Opposition Score	Rank
Ana Beatriz Fraga	Sabre	Camara (GUI) W 5–1; Jeon (KOR) L 2–5; Villacorta (ESA) W 5–0; Iriarte (BOL) W 5–4; Kinda (BUR) W 5–1; Borrelli (ARG) L 2–5	3 Q	Kinda (BUR); W 15–2	Borrelli (ARG); L 5–15	Did not advance		

== Judo ==
Brazil entered one female judoka based on the available quotas assigned by the International Judo Federation.

Women

Athlete	Event	Round of 16	Quarterfinals	Semifinals	Repechage 1	Repechage 2	Final	
Athlete	Event	Opposition Result	Opposition Result	Opposition Result	Opposition Result	Opposition Result	Opposition Result	Rank
Clarisse Vallim	–78 kg	Bye	Hasanaj (KOS); W 110–0	Pita Zorrilla (CUB); W 100–0	—N/a		Dobrovolskaia (RUS); W 110–0	1st place, gold medalist(s)

== Skateboarding ==
Brazil entered one female athlete based on available quotas.

Women

Athlete	Event	Semifinal		Final	
Athlete	Event	Result	Rank	Result	Rank
Duda Ribeiro	Street	134.74	1 Q	138.28	2nd place, silver medalist(s)

== Swimming ==
Brazil entered two swimmers, one male and one female.

Men

Athlete	Event	Heat		Final	
Athlete	Event	Time	Rank	Time	Rank
Luiz Daniel Moura	200 m butterlfy	2:06.19	5 Q	2:04.33	5
Luiz Daniel Moura	200 m individual medley	2:05.90	2 Q	1:35.15	5

Women

Athlete	Event	Heat		Final	
Athlete	Event	Time	Rank	Time	Rank
Ana Júlia Amaral	50 m butterfly	27.78	5 Q	27.91	6
Ana Júlia Amaral	100 m butterfly	1:01.48	2 Q	1:00.49	3rd place, bronze medalist(s)
Ana Júlia Amaral	200 m butterfly	—N/a		2:13.01	2nd place, silver medalist(s)

== Table tennis ==
Brazil entered two athletes (one male and one female).

Athlete	Event	Group stage				Round of 32	Round of 16	Quarterfinal	Semifinal	Final	
Athlete	Event	Opposition Result	Opposition Result	Opposition Result	Rank	Opposition Result	Opposition Result	Opposition Result	Opposition Result	Opposition Result	Rank
Felipe Okano	Men's singles	Abdourahaman (BEN); W 3–0	Kawakami (JPN); L 0–3	Asmu (ARG); L 2–3	3	—N/a	Did not advance				
Bianca Borges	Women's singles	Matsushima (JPN); L 0–3	Aquije (PER); W 3–1	Kashyap (ANT); L 2–3	3	—N/a	Did not advance				
Felipe Okano; Bianca Borges	Mixed doubles	—N/a				Lee / Heo (KOR); L 0–3	Did not advance				

== Taekwondo ==
Brazil entered one female athlete.

Women

Athlete	Event	Round of 16	Quarterfinals	Semifinals	Repechage	Final / BM	
Athlete	Event	Opposition Result	Opposition Result	Opposition Result	Opposition Result	Opposition Result	Rank
Rafaela da Costa	+63 kg	Bye	Yun (KAZ); L 0–2	Did not advance			
