= Wushu at the 2026 Summer Youth Olympics – Men's taijiquan combined =

Men's taijiquan combined at the 2026 Summer Youth Olympics
- Venue: Dakar Expo Center
- Dates: 1–3 November
- Competitors: 12 from 12 nations

Medalists
gold medal	Poon Hao Ran	Hong Kong
silver medal	Nguyen Khac le Hoang	Vietnam
bronze medal	Shiki Kawamura	Japan

The men's taijiquan combined event at the 2026 Summer Youth Olympics will take place from 1 to 3 November at the Dakar Expo Center in Dakar, Senegal.

== Results ==
=== Preliminary round ===
The preliminary round determined the top eight competitors who advanced to the final stage based on their combined scores from the taijiquan and taijishan routines.

Rank	Athlete	Nationality	Taijiquan		Taijishan		Total	Notes
Rank	Athlete	Nationality	Score	Rank	Score	Rank	Total	Notes
1	Marshall Brayton	United States	9.320	3	9.373	1	18.693	Q
2	Poon Hao Ran	Hong Kong	9.330	1	9.346	2	18.676	Q
3	Lim Kai Shen	Malaysia	9.323	2	9.300	5	18.623	Q
4	Nguyen Khac le Hoang	Vietnam	9.253	4	9.333	3	18.586	Q
5	Shiki Kawamura	Japan	9.230	5	9.330	4	18.560	Q
6	Leandro Gia Hy Luong	Switzerland	9.220	6	9.220	6	18.440	Q
7	Roberts Ritenbergs	Latvia	9.056	7	9.183	7	18.239	Q
8	Lorenzo Armani	Italy	8.973	8	8.903	8	17.876	Q
9	Mahib Amar	Senegal	8.546	11	8.873	9	17.419	
10	Oussama El Maghnaoui	Morocco	8.670	9	8.710	11	17.380	
11	Nikita Kucheruk	Ukraine	8.136	12	8.860	10	16.996	
12	Bekir Tasdemir	Turkey	8.573	10	8.360	12	16.933	

=== Final ===
Rank	Athlete	Nationality	Taijiquan		Taijishan		Total
Rank	Athlete	Nationality	Score	Rank	Score	Rank	Total
1st place, gold medalist(s)	Poon Hao Ran	Hong Kong	9.360	2	9.360	1	18.720
2nd place, silver medalist(s)	Nguyen Khac le Hoang	Vietnam	9.346	3	9.346	2	18.692
3rd place, bronze medalist(s)	Shiki Kawamura	Japan	9.333	4	9.330	3	18.663
4	Lim Kai Shen	Malaysia	9.263	5	9.320	4	18.583
5	Marshall Brayton	United States	9.386	1	9.170	5	18.556
6	Leandro Gia Hy Luong	Switzerland	9.073	8	9.053	6	18.126
7	Lorenzo Armani	Italy	9.076	7	8.880	7	17.956
8	Roberts Ritenbergs	Latvia	9.173	6	8.726	8	17.899
