= Chinese Taipei at the 2026 Summer Youth Olympics =

- Flag of Chinese Taipei
- IOC code: TPE
- NOC: Chinese Taipei Olympic Committee
- Website: www.tpenoc.net

in Dakar, Senegal October 31, 2026 – November 13, 2026
- Competitors: 37 in 16 sports
- Flag bearers: Chu Yu-en & Lee Han
- Medals Ranked 19th: Gold 2 Silver 4 Bronze 3 Total 9

Summer Youth Olympics appearances (overview)
- 2010; 2014; 2018; 2026

Chinese Taipei is scheduled to compete at the 2026 Summer Youth Olympics in Dakar, Senegal from October 31 to November 13, 2026. This will mark Chinese Taipei's fourth appearance at the Youth Olympics, after making its debut in 2010.

Wushu taolu athlete Chu Yu-en and swimmer Lee Han served as the flag bearers for the opening ceremony.

== Competitors ==
The following is the list of number of competitors participating at the Games per sport/discipline.

Sport	Men	Women	Total
3x3 basketball	0	4	4
Archery	1	0	1
Athletics	4	3	7
Badminton	1	1	2
Baseball5	4	4	8
Boxing	0	1	1
Breaking	1	0	1
Fencing	0	1	1
Judo	1	0	1
Road cycling	0	1	1
Sailing	0	1	1
Skateboarding	1	0	1
Swimming	1	1	2
Table tennis	1	1	2
Taekwondo	1	1	2
Triathlon	1	0	1
Wushu	0	1	1
Total	17	20	37

== 3x3 basketball ==
Chinese Taipei entered a team for the women's tournament as one of the three participating teams from the Americas.

Roster

- Chen Xin
- Feng Chia-ping
- Kuo Ying-ying
- Billie Leonora Lin

Summary

Event	Pool play			Quarter-final	Semi-final	Final / BM	
Event	Opposition Score	Opposition Score	Rank	Opposition Score	Opposition Score	Opposition Score	Rank
Women's tournament	Chile; W 20–17	Mexico; W 21–14	1 Q	Poland; L 10–20	Did not advance		5

== Archery ==
Chinese Taipei entered one male archer.

Men

Athlete	Event	Ranking Round		Round of 32	Round of 16	Quarter-finals	Semi-finals	Final / BM	Rank
Athlete	Event	Score	Seed	Opposition Score	Opposition Score	Opposition Score	Opposition Score	Opposition Score	Rank
Chen Pin-an	Individual	688	1	Guendouzi (ALG); W 6–0	Raz (ISR); W 6–0	Šmaguc (CRO); W 6–4	Lee (KOR); W 6–4	Lamouret (FRA); L 4–6	2nd place, silver medalist(s)

== Athletics ==
Chinese Taipei entered seven athletes, four male and three female.

=== Track & road events ===
Men

Athlete	Event	Semifinal		Final	
Athlete	Event	Result	Rank	Result	Rank
Chu Chao-feng	200 m	22.36	9 q SB	22.36	9 =SB
Wang Cheng-yu	3000 m	—N/a		8:22.16	7 PB

Women

Athlete	Event	Semifinal		Final	
Athlete	Event	Result	Rank	Result	Rank
Chen Yi-cen	400 m	57.18	7 Q	56.37	6
Lin Qiao-ling	400 m hurdles	1:01.46	8	Did not advance	

=== Field events ===
Men

Athlete	Event	Final	
Athlete	Event	Distance	Position
Huang Kai-lun	High jump	2.09	4 =PB

Women

Athlete	Event	Final	
Athlete	Event	Distance	Position
Chen Chiao-ting	High jump	1.64	6 =SB
Chen You-xin	Javelin throw	45.63	7 PB

== Badminton ==
Chinese Taipei entered two athletes, one of each gender.

Athlete	Event	Group stage				Quarter-finals	Semi-finals	Final / BM	
Athlete	Event	Opposition Result	Opposition Result	Opposition Result	Rank	Opposition Result	Opposition Result	Opposition Result	Rank
Chuang Yung-neng	Men	Cehyan (TUR); W 2–0	Bredell (RSA); W 2–0	Keddou (ALG); W 2–0	1 Q	Park (KOR); L 0–2	Did not advance		5
Cheng Chih-yun	Women	Karim (TTO); W 2–0	Cissé (SEN); W 2–0	Lengue Te (FRA); W 2–0	1 Q	Cruz (USA); W 2–1	Zhang (CHN); L 0–2	Bronze medal Watanabe (JPN); L 0–2	4

== Baseball5 ==
Chinese Taipei entered a team as one of the two participating teams from the Americas.

Roster

- Chang Wen-ting
- Chen Wan-zih
- Hsu Shao-ting
- Pan Yu-fan
- An Wei-jie
- Chen Yu-en
- Hsu Tzu-yi
- Liu En-hao

Summary

Event	Group stage				Quarter-finals	Semi-finals	Final / PG / BM	
Event	Opposition Result	Opposition Result	Opposition Result	Rank	Opposition Result	Opposition Result	Opposition Result	Rank
Mixed tournament	Senegal; W 2–0	Turkey; W 2–0	Cuba; W 2–0	1 Q	Bye	Mexico; W 2–1	Cuba; L 0–2	2nd place, silver medalist(s)

== Boxing ==
Chinese Taipei entered one female athlete in the −57 kg category.

Women

Athlete	Weight	Round of 16	Quarter-finals	Semi-finals	Final / BM	
Athlete	Weight	Opposition Result	Opposition Result	Opposition Result	Opposition Result	Rank
Lin Yu-jun	–57 kg	Bahri (ALG); L 0–5	Did not advance			9

== Breaking ==
Chinese Taipei entered one male athlete.

Breaker	Nickname	Event	Pre-select		Group Stage						Quarter-finals	Semi-finals	Final / BM	
Breaker	Nickname	Event	Score	Rank	Opposition Result	Opposition Result	Opposition Result	Round	Votes	Rank	Opposition Result	Opposition Result	Opposition Result	Rank
Lin Yong-yue	Saturn	B-Boys	76.6	3	Edgar (LAT); W 2–0	Sunny (HKG); W 2–0	Leo (ITA); W 2–0	6	53	1 Q	Bilel (MAR); W 3–0	Littleman (POL); W 3–0	Holy Rain (CHN); L 0–3	2nd place, silver medalist(s)

== Fencing ==
Chinese Taipei won one female quota in this edition.

Women

Athlete	Event	Pool round							Round of 16	Quarter-finals	Semi-finals	Final / BM	
Athlete	Event	Opposite score	Opposite score	Opposite score	Opposite score	Opposite score	Opposite score	Rank	Opposite score	Opposite score	Opposite score	Opposite score	Rank
Ariel Lin	Épée	Sabonete (ANG); W 5–1	Madani (IRI); W 5–4	Mbaye (SEN); L 3–4	Aina (ITA); L 4–5	Fassassi (BEN); W 5–1	Al-Sharji (OMA); W 3–2	6	Kouassi (CIV); W 15–6	Horváth (HUN); L 9–15	Did not advance		6

== Judo ==
Chinese Taipei entered one female judoka based on the available quotas assigned by the International Judo Federation.

Men

Athlete	Event	Round of 16	Quarter-finals	Semi-finals	Repechage	Final / BM	
Athlete	Event	Opposition Result	Opposition Result	Opposition Result	Opposition Result	Opposition Result	Rank
Li Yau-lin	–100 kg	Simić (SRB); L 000–100	Did not advance		Arai (JPN); L 0s1–100	Did not advance	9

== Road cycling ==
Chinese Taipei entered one female athlete.

Women

Athlete	Event	Time	Rank
Yang Chiao-hui	Road race	1:31:19	18
Yang Chiao-hui	Time trial	12:28.36	11

== Sailing ==
Chinese Taipei entered one female athlete.

Athlete	Event	Opening Series – Points per Race														Total points	Net points	Final rank
Athlete	Event	1	2	3	4	5	6	7	8	9	10	11	12	13	14	Total points	Net points	Final rank
Chang Tsai-yi	Women's windsurfing	12	~~19~~	19	19	~~20~~	17	17	~~22~~	19	10	10	19	19	17	230	178	19

== Skateboarding ==
Chinese Taipei entered one male athlete based on available quotas.

Athlete	Event	Semi-final		Final	
Athlete	Event	Result	Rank	Result	Rank
Yu Yi-che	Men's street	139.44	3 Q	32.65	6

== Swimming ==
Chinese Taipei entered two swimmers, one male and one female.

Men

Athlete	Event	Heat		Final	
Athlete	Event	Time	Rank	Time	Rank
Lee Han	50 m freestyle	23.59	6 Q	23.35	5
Lee Han	100 m freestyle	50.42	1 Q	50.26	3rd place, bronze medalist(s)
Lee Han	200 m freestyle	1:54.01	13	Did not advance	

Women

Athlete	Event	Heat		Final	
Athlete	Event	Time	Rank	Time	Rank
Wen Chu-ting	50 m freestyle	26.42	5 Q	26.26	5
Wen Chu-ting	100 m freestyle	58.25	8 Q	57.88	8
Wen Chu-ting	50 m backstroke	30.21	13	Did not advance	
Wen Chu-ting	50 m butterfly	28.44	11	Did not advance	

== Table tennis ==
Chinese Taipei entered two athletes (one male and one female).

Singles

Athlete	Event	Group stage				Round of 16	Quarter-finals	Semi-finals	Final	
Athlete	Event	Opposition Result	Opposition Result	Opposition Result	Rank	Opposition Result	Opposition Result	Opposition Result	Opposition Result	Rank
Lin Chin-ting	Men	Xiao (NZL); W 3–0	Moreno (PUR); L 1–3	Chang (AUS); W 3–0	2 Q	Faraji (IRI); W 4–3	Li (HKG); L 1–4	Did not advance		5
Chen Min-hsin	Women	Baiasu (ROU); W 3–0	Skerbinz (LAT); L 0–3	Maldonado (COL); W 3–0	2 Q	Yao (CHN); W 4–3	Itagaki (GER); W 4–0	Matsushima (JPN); W 4–0	Loy (SGP); W 4–2	1st place, gold medalist(s)

Doubles

Athlete	Event	Round of 32	Round of 16	Quarter-finals	Semi-finals	Final	
Athlete	Event	Opposition Result	Opposition Result	Opposition Result	Opposition Result	Opposition Result	Rank
Lin Chin-ting; Chen Min-hsin	Mixed doubles	Bye	Żyworonek / Rajkowska (POL); W 3–1	Lee / Heo (KOR); W 3–1	Kawakami / Matsushima (JPN); L 1–3	Preechayan / Vijitviriyagul (THA); W 3–2	3rd place, bronze medalist(s)

== Taekwondo ==
Chinese Taipei entered two athletes, one of each gender.

Men

Athlete	Event	Round of 16	Quarter-finals	Semi-finals	Final	
Athlete	Event	Opposition Result	Opposition Result	Opposition Result	Opposition Result	Rank
Cheng Po-yu	55 kg	Bye	Vulue (LBR); W 2–0	Tordoya (BOL); W 2–0	Samandarov (UZB); W 2–1	1st place, gold medalist(s)

Women

Athlete	Event	Round of 16	Quarter-finals	Semi-finals	Final	
Athlete	Event	Opposition Result	Opposition Result	Opposition Result	Opposition Result	Rank
Lai Yi-jhen	44 kg	Bye	Zhao (CHN); W' 2–0	Tkhamokova (RUS); L 0–2	Did not advance	3rd place, bronze medalist(s)

== Triathlon ==
Chinese Taipei entered one male athlete.

Athlete	Event	Time						Rank
Athlete	Event	Swim (750m)	Trans 1	Bike (20km)	Trans 2	Run (5km)	Total	Rank
Huang Li-je	Men's individual	8:38	0:22	28:16	0:24	19:37	57:17	21

== Wushu ==
Chinese Taipei entered one female athlete after quotas were assigned by the International Wushu Federation.

Athlete	Event	Preliminary				Final			Final Rank
Athlete	Event	Taijishan	Taijiquan	Points	Rank	Taijishan	Taijiquan	Points	Final Rank
Chu Yu-en	Women's taijiquan combined	9.233	9.330	18.563	2 Q	9.166	9.333	18.499	2nd place, silver medalist(s)
