= United States at the 2026 Summer Youth Olympics =

- Flag of United States
- IOC code: USA
- NOC: United States Olympic & Paralympic Committee
- Website: www.teamusa.com

in Dakar, Senegal October 31, 2026 – November 13, 2026
- Competitors: 29 in 11 sports
- Flag bearers: Luisa Moala & Caden Phillips
- Medals: Gold 1 Silver 1 Bronze 1 Total 3

Summer Youth Olympics appearances (overview)
- 2010; 2014; 2018; 2026

United States is scheduled to compete at the 2026 Summer Youth Olympics in Dakar, Senegal from October 31 to November 13, 2026. This will mark United States's fourth appearance at the Youth Olympics, after making its debut in 2010.

Rugby sevens player Luisa Moala and beach volleyball player Caden Phillips served as the flag bearers for the opening ceremony.

== Competitors ==
The following is the list of number of competitors participating at the Games per sport/discipline.

| Sport | Men | Women | Total |
|---|---|---|---|
| Archery | 1 | 1 | 2 |
| Badminton | 1 | 1 | 2 |
| Beach volleyball | 2 | 0 | 2 |
| Beach wrestling | 0 | 3 | 3 |
| Breaking | 0 | 1 | 1 |
| Coastal rowing | 1 | 1 | 2 |
| Equestrian | 0 | 1 | 1 |
| Rugby sevens | 0 | 12 | 12 |
| Taekwondo | 0 | 1 | 1 |
| Triathlon | 0 | 1 | 1 |
| Wushu | 1 | 0 | 1 |
| Total | 7 | 22 | 29 |

== Medalists ==
| Medal | Name | Sport | Event | Date |
|---|---|---|---|---|
| Gold | Julian Jeang-Agliardi | Skateboarding | Men's street | 4 November |
| Silver | Liza Tittle | Equestrian | Individual jumping | 6 November |

== Archery ==
United States entered two archers, one of each gender.

| Athlete | Event | Ranking Round | | Round of 16 | Quarterfinals | Semifinals | Final / BM | Rank |
| Athlete | Event | Score | Seed | Opposition Score | Opposition Score | Opposition Score | Opposition Score | Rank |
|---|---|---|---|---|---|---|---|---|
| Ye-eun Whang | Men's individual | | | | | | | |
| Aarya Arun | Women's individual | | | | | | | |
| Ye-eun Whang; Aarya Arun | Mixed team | | | | | | | |

== Badminton ==
United States entered two athletes, one of each gender.

| Athlete | Event | Group stage | | | | Quarter-final | Semi-final | Final / BM | |
| Athlete | Event | Opposition Score | Opposition Score | Opposition Score | Rank | Opposition Score | Opposition Score | Opposition Score | Rank |
|---|---|---|---|---|---|---|---|---|---|
| Rithik Radamsetti | Men's singles | Douce (MRI); W (21–14, 21–8) | Adumintah (GHA); W (21–13, 21–5) | Ahmadloo (IRI); W (21–19, 21–19) | 1 Q | Sow (FRA); L (18–21, 12–21) | Did not advance | | |
| Micah Henares Cruz | Women's singles | Bukenya (UGA); W (21–1, 21–5) | Poperezhai (UKR); W (21–11, 21–12) | Parab (GBR); W (19–21, 21–19, 21–15) | 1 Q | Cheng (TPE) | | | |

== Beach volleyball ==
United States received a quota place for the men's tournament.

Summary

| Team | Event | Group stage | | | | Round of 16 | Quarterfinals | Semifinals | Final / PG / BM | |
| Team | Event | Opposition Result | Opposition Result | Opposition Result | Rank | Opposition Result | Opposition Result | Opposition Result | Opposition Result | Rank |
|---|---|---|---|---|---|---|---|---|---|---|
| Gavin Mortensen; Caden Phillips | Men's tournament | Lobo Silva Souza / Campos (BRA); L 0–2 | Camejo / Yepez (VEN); W 2–0 | Godoy / Vasquez (GUA); W 2–0 | 2 Q | Eser / Foks (TUR); W 2–0 | Edgar / Turner (AUS); L 0–2 | Did not advance | | |

== Beach wrestling ==
United States entered three female athletes.

Women

| Athlete | Weight | Round of 16 | Quarterfinals | Semifinals | Final / BM | |
| Athlete | Weight | Opposition Result | Opposition Result | Opposition Result | Opposition Result | Rank |
|---|---|---|---|---|---|---|
| Piper Fry | –45 kg | | | | | |
| Aleia Apostol | –65 kg | | | | | |
| Tilly Hruby | –75 kg | | | | | |

== Breaking ==
United States entered one female athlete.

| Athlete | Nickname | Event | Group Stage | | | Quarterfinal | Semifinal | Final / BM | |
| Athlete | Nickname | Event | Round | Votes | Rank | Opposition Result | Opposition Result | Opposition Result | Rank |
|---|---|---|---|---|---|---|---|---|---|
| Keira Barth | Krazy | B-Girls | | | | | | | |

== Coastal rowing ==
United States entered two rowers, one of each gender.

| Athlete | Event | Qualification | | Round of 16 | Quarterfinal | Semifinal | Final | |
| Athlete | Event | Time | Rank | Opposition Time | Opposition Time | Opposition Time | Opposition Time | Rank |
|---|---|---|---|---|---|---|---|---|
| Isaac Moos | Men's solo | 2:39.97 | 23 | Did not advance | | | | |
| Allison Grove | Women's solo | 2:57.88 | 9 Q | Guerra Gonzalez (GER); L 2:57.92 | Did not advance | | | |
| Isaac Moos; Allison Grove | Mixed double sculls | 2:29.24 | 10 Q | Tunisia; W 2:18.73 | China; L 2:20.18 | Did not advance | | |

== Equestrian ==
United States received a quota place as one of the four invited NOCs from North America.

| Athlete | Horse | Event | Qualification | | | | | Final | |
| Athlete | Horse | Event | Round 1 | | Round 2 | | | Final | |
| Athlete | Horse | Event | Penalties | Rank | Penalties | Total | Rank | Penalties | Rank |
|---|---|---|---|---|---|---|---|---|---|
| Liza Tittle | Senji de Reaute | Individual jumping | 4.00 | 5 | | | | | |

== Rugby sevens ==
United States entered a team for the women's tournament.

Summary

| Event | Group stage | | | | Classification match | Fifth place match | |
| Event | Opposition Score | Opposition Score | Opposition Score | Group Rank | Opposition Score | Opposition Score | Rank |
|---|---|---|---|---|---|---|---|
| Women's tournament | Madagascar; L 10–12 | Czech Republic; L 21–24 | Spain; W 14–0 | 3 | Senegal; W 14–5 | China; L 7–36 | 6 |

Roster

- Mallory Crawford
- Sofie Ferri
- Hunivaololo Folau
- Chloe Gandy
- Rebekah Jenks
- Sophia Johnson
- Lavi Lomu
- Abbey McGettigan
- Eseta Moala
- Luisa Moala
- Ella Moynihan
- Avery Russer

== Skateboarding ==
United States entered one male athlete based on available quotas.

| Athlete | Event | Semifinal | | Final | |
| Athlete | Event | Result | Rank | Result | Rank |
|---|---|---|---|---|---|
| Julian Jeang-Agliardi | Men's street | 143,23 | 1 Q | 149.37 | 1st place, gold medalist(s) |

== Taekwondo ==
United States entered one female athlete.

Women

| Athlete | Event | Round of 16 | Quarterfinals | Semifinals | Repechage | Final / BM | |
| Athlete | Event | Opposition Result | Opposition Result | Opposition Result | Opposition Result | Opposition Result | Rank |
|---|---|---|---|---|---|---|---|
| Karlee Vogel | –55 kg | | | | | | |

== Triathlon ==
United States entered one female athlete.

| Athlete | Event | Time | | | | | | Rank |
| Athlete | Event | Swim (750m) | Trans 1 | Bike (20km) | Trans 2 | Run (5km) | Total | Rank |
|---|---|---|---|---|---|---|---|---|
| Avalyn Thompson | Women's individual | | | | | | | |

== Wushu ==
United States entered one male athlete after quotas were assigned by the International Wushu Federation.

| Athlete | Event | Preliminary | | | | | | Final | | | | | |
| Athlete | Event | Event 1 | | Event 2 | | Total | | Event 1 | | Event 2 | | Total | |
| Athlete | Event | Result | Rank | Result | Rank | Result | Rank | Result | Rank | Result | Rank | Result | Rank |
|---|---|---|---|---|---|---|---|---|---|---|---|---|---|
| Marshall Brayton | Men's taijiquan combined | 9.320 | 3 | 9.373 | 1 | 18.693 | 1 Q | 9.386 | 1 | 9.170 | 5 | 18.556 | 5 |
