= Fencing at the 2026 Summer Youth Olympics – Men's sabre =

Men's sabre fencing event at the 2026 Summer Youth Olympics

Men's sabre at the IV Summer Youth Olympic Games
- Venue: Dakar Expo Center
- Dates: 13 November
- Competitors: 13 from 13 nations

Medalists
3rd place, bronze medalist(s)		Ashton Auw	Singapore

The men's sabre competition at the 2026 Summer Youth Olympics was held at the Dakar Expo Center in Dakar, Senegal, on 13 November 2026. Thirteen fencers from thirteen National Olympic Committees competed in the event.

== Schedule ==
The competition was held on 10 November 2026 at the Dakar Expo Center. All times were as listed in the official competition schedule.

Date	Time	Phase
13 November 2026	9:00	Pool round
13 November 2026	10:00	Table of 16
13 November 2026	10:45	Table of 8
13 November 2026	11:15	Semifinals
13 November 2026	12:00	Bronze medal bout
13 November 2026	12:20	Gold medal bout

== Format ==
The competition consisted of a pool round followed by direct elimination. Thirteen fencers were divided into two pools. The pool round was followed by the Table of 16, Table of 8, semifinals and medal bouts.

== Results ==
=== Pool round ===
Thirteen fencers competed in two pools. The following tables show the pool results as published by the official Dakar 2026 results service.

==== Pool 1 ====
Pos.	Athlete	(Senegal)	(Singapore)	(Iraq)	(Turkey)	(Azerbaijan)	(Kazakhstan)	(Iceland)	V#	M#	V/M	HS	HR	Diff.	PR
1	Djibril Gueye (SEN)		4	4	2	0	0	1	0	6	0.000	11	30	–19	7
2	Ashton Auw (SGP)	V		V	V	V	V	V	6	6	1.000	30	13	+17	1
3	Hayder Al-Asadi (IRQ)	V	0		1	2	1	V	2	6	0.333	16	27	–11	5
4	Candeniz Berrak (TUR)	V	1	V		3	4	V	3	6	0.500	23	19	+4	4
5	Abbas Hüseynov (AZE)	V	4	V	V		V	V	5	6	0.833	29	13	+16	2
6	Aibar Kaiym (KAZ)	V	3	V	V	3		V	4	6	0.667	26	16	+10	3
7	Ari Jónasson (ISL)	V	1	3	1	0	1		1	6	0.167	11	26	–15	6

==== Pool 2 ====
Pos.	Athlete	(Bulgaria)	(Kuwait)	(Germany)	(Georgia (country))	(Democratic Republic of the Congo)	(Tunisia)	V#	M#	V/M	HS	HR	Diff.	PR
1	Nikola Meitsov (BUL)		V	4	V	V	V	4	5	0.800	24	15	+9	2
2	Abdulaziz Al-Duaij (KUW)	4		2	3	V	4	1	5	0.200	18	23	–5	5
3	Severin Spielberg (GER)	V	V		V	V	V	5	5	1.000	25	10	+15	1
4	Giorgi Urushadze (GEO)	4	V	4		V	V	3	5	0.600	23	18	+5	3
5	Tulunga Yembele (COD)	1	3	0	3		0	0	5	0.000	7	25	–18	6
6	Mohammed El Ghanja (TUN)	1	V	0	2	V		2	5	0.400	13	19	–6	4

Legend

- V – Victory
- V4 – Victory with four hits received
- Number – Hits scored by the fencer in a lost bout
- V# – Number of victories
- M# – Number of bouts
- V/M – Victory index (victories divided by bouts)
- HS – Hits scored
- HR – Hits received
- Diff. – Difference between hits scored and hits received (HS − HR)
- PR – Rank in pool
- MED – Medical

=== Bracket ===
Round of 16
9	Hayder Al-Asadi (IRQ)	15
8	Mohammed El Ghanja (TUN)	12
5	Aibar Kaiym (KAZ)	15
12	Tulunga Yembele (COD)	3
13	Djibril Gueye (SEN)	2
4	Nikola Meitsov (BUL)	15
11	Ari Jónasson (ISL)	1
6	Giorgi Urushadze (GEO)	15
7	Candeniz Berrak (TUR)	15
10	Abdulaziz Al-Duaij (KUW)	7

Quarterfinals
1	Ashton Auw (SGP)	15
9	Hayder Al-Asadi (IRQ)	11
5	Aibar Kaiym (KAZ)	15
4	Nikola Meitsov (BUL)	10
3	Abbas Hüseynov (AZE)	1
6	Giorgi Urushadze (GEO)	15
7	Candeniz Berrak (TUR)	15
2	Severin Spielberg (GER)	14

Semifinals
1	Ashton Auw (SGP)	13
5	Aibar Kaiym (KAZ)	15
6	Giorgi Urushadze (GEO)	11
7	Candeniz Berrak (TUR)	15

Gold medal bout
5	Aibar Kaiym (KAZ)
7	Candeniz Berrak (TUR)
Bronze medal bout
1	Ashton Auw (SGP)	15
6	Giorgi Urushadze (GEO)	10

=== Final standings ===
Rank	Athlete	Nation
1st place, gold medalist(s)		
2nd place, silver medalist(s)		
3rd place, bronze medalist(s)		
4		
5	Severin Spielberg	Germany
6	Abbas Hüseynov	Azerbaijan
7	Nikola Meitsov	Bulgaria
8	Hayder Al-Asadi	Iraq
9	Mohammed El Ghanja	Tunisia
10	Mohammed Al-Duaij	Kuwait
11	Ari Jónasson	Iceland
12	Tulunga Yembele	Democratic Republic of the Congo
13	Djibril Gueye	Senegal
