= Fencing at the 2026 Summer Youth Olympics – Men's épée =

Women's épée fencing event at the 2026 Summer Youth Olympics

Men's épée at the IV Summer Youth Olympic Games
- Venue: Dakar Expo Center
- Dates: 11 November
- Competitors: 13 from 13 nations

Medalists
1st place, gold medalist(s)		Simon Shan	Canada
2nd place, silver medalist(s)		Vukan Rađenović	Serbia
3rd place, bronze medalist(s)		Wout Van Laecke	Belgium

The mn's épée competition at the 2026 Summer Youth Olympics was held at the Dakar Expo Center in Dakar, Senegal, on 11 November 2026. Thirteen fencers from thirteen National Olympic Committees competed in the event.

== Schedule ==
The competition was held on 10 November 2026 at the Dakar Expo Center. All times were as listed in the official competition schedule.

Date	Time	Phase
10 November 2026	10:00	Pool round
10 November 2026	11:15	Table of 16
10 November 2026	12:15	Table of 8
10 November 2026	14:00	Semifinals
10 November 2026	15:00	Bronze medal bout
10 November 2026	15:30	Gold medal bout

== Format ==
The competition consisted of a pool round followed by direct elimination. Thirteen fencers were divided into two pools. The pool round was followed by the Table of 16, Table of 8, semifinals and medal bouts.

== Results ==
=== Pool round ===
Thirteen fencers competed in two pools. The following tables show the pool results as published by the official Dakar 2026 results service.

==== Pool 1 ====
Pos.	Athlete	(Israel)	(Serbia)	(Dominican Republic)	(Panama)	(Mauritius)	(Senegal)	(Canada)	V#	M#	V/M	HS	HR	Diff.	PR
1	Mordechai Lachman (ISR)		V	V	V	V	V	2	5	6	0.833	27	13	+14	1
2	Vukan Rađenović (SRB)	2		V	V	V	V	V	5	6	0.833	27	20	+7	3
3	Aiden Zahran (DOM)	2	3		2	V	4	0	1	6	0.167	16	27	–11	6
4	Caleb Caldito (PAN)	2	3	V		V3	V	3	3	6	0.500	21	21	0	4
5	Alexandre Aime (MRI)	0	3	2	1		4	0	0	6	0.000	10	30	−20	7
6	Ma Diop Diop (SEN)	3	3	V	4	V		2	2	6	0.333	22	28	−6	5
7	Simon Shan (CAN)	V4	3	V	V4	V	V		5	6	0.833	26	12	+14	2

==== Pool 2 ====
Pos.	Athlete	(Romania)	(Belgium)	(Colombia)	(Switzerland)	(Libya)	(Saudi Arabia)	V#	M#	V/M	HS	HR	Diff.	PR
1	Ștefan Popa (ROU)		V	2	V	4	4	2	5	0.400	20	20	0	4
2	Wout Van Laecke (BEL)	2		3	3	V	4	1	5	0.200	17	20	–3	5
3	Juan Esteban Plazas (COL)	V	V		2	V	3	3	5	0.600	20	18	+2	3
4	Juri Heer (SUI)	3	V	V		V	4	3	5	0.600	22	17	+5	2
5	Yazin Bin Iswayd (LBA)	V	0	3	2		2	1	5	0.200	12	24	−12	6
6	Ali Al-Fuzaya (KSA)	V	V	V	V	V		5	5	1.000	25	17	+8	1

Legend

- V – Victory
- V4 – Victory with four hits received
- Number – Hits scored by the fencer in a lost bout
- V# – Number of victories
- M# – Number of bouts
- V/M – Victory index (victories divided by bouts)
- HS – Hits scored
- HR – Hits received
- Diff. – Difference between hits scored and hits received (HS − HR)
- PR – Rank in pool
- MED – Medical

=== Bracket ===
Round of 16
9	Ma Diop Diop (SEN)	9
8	Ștefan Popa (ROU)	15
5	Juri Heer (SUI)	15
12	Aiden Zahran (DOM)	2
13	Alexandre Aime (MRI)	6
4	Vukan Rađenović (SRB)	15
11	Yazin Bin Iswayd (LBA)	9
6	Juan Esteben Plazas (COL)	15
7	Caleb Caldito (PAN)	7
10	Wout Van Laecke (BEL)	15

Quarterfinals
1	Ali Al-Fuzaya (KSA)	11
8	Ștefan Popa (ROU)	13
5	Juri Heer (SUI)	8
4	Vukan Rađenović (SRB)	15
3	Simon Shan (CAN)	15
6	Juan Esteben Plazas (COL)	6
10	Wout Van Laecke (BEL)	15
2	Mordechai Lachman (ISR)	14

Semifinals
8	Ștefan Popa (ROU)	6
4	Vukan Rađenović (SRB)	15
3	Simon Shan (CAN)	15
10	Wout Van Laecke (BEL)	10

Gold medal bout
4	Vukan Rađenović (SRB)	9
3	Simon Shan (CAN)	15
Bronze medal bout
8	Ștefan Popa (ROU)	12
15	Wout Van Laecke (BEL)	15

=== Final standings ===
Rank	Athlete	Nation
1st place, gold medalist(s)	Simon Shai	Canada
2nd place, silver medalist(s)	Vukan Radenovic	Serbia
3rd place, bronze medalist(s)	Wout van Laecke	Belgium
4	Stefan Popa	Romania
5	Ali Al-Fuzaya	Saudi Arabia
6	Mordechai Lachman	Israel
7	Juri Heer	Switzerland
8	Juan Esteban Plazas	Colombia
9	Caleb Caldito	Panama
10	Ma Diop Diop	Senegal
11	Yazin Bin Iswayd	Libya
12	Aiden Zahran	Dominican Republic
13	Alexandre Aime	Mauritius
