= Triathlon at the 2026 Summer Youth Olympics =

Triathlon at the IV Summer Youth Olympic Games
- Venue: Saly Beach Ouest
- Dates: 5–6 November
- No. of events: 2 (1 boys, 1 girls)
- Competitors: 64 (32 boys, 32 girls) from 63 nations

Triathlon at the 2026 Summer Youth Olympics was held from 5 to 6 November. The events took place at Saly Beach Ouest in Saly Portudal, Senegal.

== Qualification ==
On 17 April 2026, World Triathlon announced the allocations of the 64 quota places for the 2026 summer youth olympics. Sweden later declined their spot in the boys' competition, with Latvia receiving it instead.

Region	Boys	Girls
Africa	Senegal	
Africa	Kenya	Algeria
Africa	Morocco	Egypt
Africa	Mozambique	Mauritius
Africa	Namibia	South Africa
Africa	Tunisia	Zimbabwe
Europe	Austria	Belgium
Europe	Czech Republic	Estonia
Europe	Denmark	France
Europe	Italy	Germany
Europe	Latvia	Hungary
Europe	Luxembourg	Romania
Europe	North Macedonia	Serbia
Europe	Norway	Slovakia
Europe	Poland	Spain
Europe	Portugal	Switzerland
Europe	~~Sweden~~	Turkey
Europe	Slovenia	—N/a
Americas	Bermuda	Barbados
Americas	Chile	Colombia
Americas	Mexico	Costa Rica
Americas	Puerto Rico	Ecuador
Americas	Uruguay	Guatemala
Americas	Venezuela	United States
Asia	Chinese Taipei	China
Asia	Iran	Hong Kong
Asia	Japan	Indonesia
Asia	Kazakhstan	Jordan
Asia	Saudi Arabia	South Korea
Asia	Uzbekistan	United Arab Emirates
Oceania	Fiji	Australia
Oceania	New Zealand	Cook Islands
Oceania	Samoa	Palau

== Medal summary ==
=== Medal table ===
* Host nation (Senegal)

Rank	Nation	Gold	Silver	Bronze	Total
1	Portugal	1	0	0	1
1	Switzerland	1	0	0	1
3	Hungary	0	1	0	1
3	Luxembourg	0	1	0	1
5	Estonia	0	0	1	1
5	Japan	0	0	1	1
5	Kazakhstan	0	0	1	1
Totals (7 entries)		2	2	3	7

=== Medalists ===
Event	Gold	Silver	Bronze
Men's	Artur Gaspar; Portugal	Émile Vanolst; Luxembourg	Daiki Nishizaki; Japan
Men's	Artur Gaspar; Portugal	Émile Vanolst; Luxembourg	Ramazan Ainegov; Kazakhstan
Women's	Kimey Casanova; Switzerland	Jázmin Kropkó; Hungary	Evamaria Albert; Estonia
