= Skateboarding at the 2026 Summer Youth Olympics – Men's street =

Men's street at the IV Summer Youth Olympic Games
- Skateboarding pictogram
- Venue: Complexe Tour de l'Oeuf
- Dates: 4 November 2026
- Competitors: 12 from 12 nations

Medalists
1st place, gold medalist(s)		Julian Jeang-Agliardi	United States
2nd place, silver medalist(s)		Tijmen Overbeek	Netherlands
3rd place, bronze medalist(s)		Simon Gerber	Switzerland

The men's street skateboarding competition at the 2026 Summer Youth Olympics took place on 4 November 2026 at the Complexe Tour de l'Oeuf in Dakar, Senegal.

== Competition format ==
The competition consisted of two 45-second runs followed by three single trick attempts in the qualification round. Only the highest-scoring run and the highest-scoring single trick were counted towards each skateboarder's total score. The total score was calculated by adding the highest run score and the highest trick score.

The qualification round consisted of two heats, with the top six skateboarders in the overall ranking advancing to the final.

In the final, the six qualified skateboarders performed three runs followed by three single trick attempts. The highest-scoring run and the highest-scoring single trick were combined to determine the final score and medal positions.

== Results ==
=== Qualification ===
The qualification round was held on 4 November 2026. The top six skateboarders advanced to the final.

Rank	Heat	Skateboarder	Nation	Run		Trick			Total	Qualification	
Rank	Heat	Skateboarder	Nation	1	2	1	2	3	Total	Qualification	
1	1	Julian Jeang-Agliardi	Nation	United States	~~45.95~~	67.65	~~67.87~~	75.58	~~0.00~~	143.23	Q
2	1	Tijmen Overbeek	Netherlands	~~61.47~~	64.54	~~69.59~~	77.75	~~76.46~~	142.29	Q	
3	1	Yu Yi-che	Chinese Taipei	~~41.48~~	58.15	~~0.00~~	81.29	~~0.00~~	139.44	Q	
4	2	Simon Gerber	Switzerland	~~59.56~~	65.50	67.17	~~56.91~~	~~0.00~~	132.67	Q	
5	1	Silas Aagaard-Hagen	Norway	60.93	~~45.74~~	~~65.19~~	~~0.00~~	68.57	129.50	Q	
6	1	Juan Esteban Garcés	Colombia	~~53.56~~	57.74	~~68.95~~	71.23	~~0.00~~	128.97	Q	
7	2	Zaidhar Ibrahim	Indonesia	~~18.13~~	56.18	~~64.58~~	~~0.00~~	65.57	121.75		
8	1	Alessandro Mudu	Italy	57.32	~~15.85~~	63.14	~~0.00~~	~~0.00~~	120.46		
9	2	Joaquín Rodríguez	Argentina	~~17.43~~	43.41	~~0.00~~	~~0.00~~	67.22	110.63		
10	2	Molemo Losaba	South Africa	43.32	~~27.83~~	66.53	~~0.00~~	~~0.00~~	109.85		
11	2	Jacen Yactayo	Peru	32.54	~~14.41~~	~~0.00~~	~~0.00~~	61.31	93.85		
12	2	Mahathir Muhammad Nor Azam	Malaysia	~~11.54~~	24.95	~~0.00~~	63.01	~~0.00~~	87.96		

=== Final ===
Rank	Skateboarder	Nation	Run			Trick			Total
Rank	Skateboarder	Nation	1	2	3	1	2	3	Total
1st place, gold medalist(s)	Julian Jeang-Agliardi	United States	~~69.24~~	~~39.93~~	73.77	75.60	~~0.00~~	~~0.00~~	149.37
2nd place, silver medalist(s)	Tijmen Overbeek	Netherlands	~~50.80~~	65.23	~~49.82~~	~~0.00~~	77.78	~~0.00~~	143.01
3rd place, bronze medalist(s)	Simon Gerber	Switzerland	~~58.62~~	~~26.26~~	67.40	~~0.00~~	73.39	~~0.00~~	140.79
4	Silas Aagaard-Hagen	Norway	~~49.71~~	64.56	~~32.45~~	68.37	~~0.00~~	~~0.00~~	132.93*
5	Juan Esteban Garcés	Colombia	~~42.22~~	62.62	~~48.71~~	70.31	~~0.00~~	~~0.00~~	132.93*
6	Yu Yi-che	Chinese Taipei	~~25.12~~	32.65	~~28.07~~	~~0.00~~	~~0.00~~	~~0.00~~	32.65

- An asterisk denotes a tie between skateboarders. The official results refer to the tie-breaking protocol for details.
