= Athletics at the 2026 Summer Youth Olympics – Women's 400 metres hurdles =

Athletics event at the 2026 Summer Youth Olympics

Women's 400 metres hurdles at the IV Summer Youth Olympic Games
- Venue: Complexe Iba Mar Diop
- Dates: 9–10 November 2026
- Competitors: 16 from 16 nations

Medalists
1st place, gold medalist(s)		Megan Nieman	South Africa
2nd place, silver medalist(s)		Mina Hirsbrunner	Switzerland
3rd place, bronze medalist(s)		Michell Carolina Gómez	Colombia

The women's 400 metres hurdles event at the 2026 Summer Youth Olympics was held on 9 and 10 November at the Complexe Iba Mar Diop in Dakar, Senegal. South Africa's Megan Nieman won the gold medal in the final with a time of 57.75 seconds.

The competition consisted of two phases: the semi-finals and the final. The first four athletes in each semi-final and the next fastest athlete qualified for the final.

== Schedule ==
The official competition schedule listed the semi-finals on 9 November and the final on 10 November 2026.

All times are local (UTC).

Date	Time	Round
9 November 2026	14:26	Semi-finals
10 November 2026	14:12	Final

== Results ==
=== Semi-finals ===
The semi-finals were held on 9 November 2026. The first four athletes in each semi-final (Q) and the next fastest athlete (q) qualified for the final. The first semi-final began at 14:26 and the second at 14:35.

Rank	Bib	Athlete	Nation	Semi-final	Position	Result	Notes
1	136	Michell Carolina Gómez	Colombia	SF2	1	59.96	Q
2	264	Mina Hirsbrunner	Switzerland	SF2	2	1:00.12	Q
3	118	Larissa Schon	Brazil	SF2	3	1:00.38	Q, PB
4	185	Hila Varsano	Israel	SF2	4	1:00.51	Q
5	245	Megan Nieman	South Africa	SF1	1	1:00.56	Q
6	191	Sheneca Harris	Jamaica	SF2	5	1:00.78	q
7	258	Zarja Žižek	Slovenia	SF1	2	1:00.98	Q
8	274	Lin Qiao-ling	Chinese Taipei	SF2	6	1:01.46	
9	173	Mary Coffie	Ghana	SF1	3	1:01.59	Q
10	241	Delia Ioana Astefanoaie	Romania	SF1	4	1:01.64	Q
11	227	Rita Chisom Ezeh	Nigeria	SF2	7	1:01.66	PB
12	212	Malak Elmaaroufi	Morocco	SF1	5	1:02.08	
13	289	Shodiyona Rahmonova	Uzbekistan	SF1	6	1:02.11	SB
14	196	Margarita Kossinova	Kazakhstan	SF1	7	1:05.84	
15	186	Safiya Prasad	Virgin Islands	SF2	8	1:06.18	
	249	Vaetoeifaga Wongsin Elisaia	Samoa	SF1		DNF	

=== Final ===
The final was held on 10 November 2026.

Rank	Bib	Athlete	Nation	Result	Reaction time	Remark
1st place, gold medalist(s)	245	Megan Nieman	South Africa	57.75	0.151	
2nd place, silver medalist(s)	264	Mina Hirsbrunner	Switzerland	57.84	0.134	
3rd place, bronze medalist(s)	136	Michell Carolina Gómez	Colombia	58.90	0.158	
4	185	Hila Varsano	Israel	1:00.19	0.177	
5	118	Larissa Schon	Brazil	1:00.63	0.174	
6	241	Delia Ioana Astefanoaiei	Romania	1:00.77	0.186	
7	191	Sheneca Harris	Jamaica	1:00.97	0.175	
8	258	Zarja Žižek	Slovenia	1:01.38	0.150	
9	173	Mary Coffie	Ghana	1:04.10	0.195	
