= Shiki Kawamura =

Japanese wushu taolu athlete (born 2010)

Personal information
- Native name: 川村 心輝
- Full name: Shiki Kawamura
- Nationality: Japan
- Born: 9 June 2009 (age 17) Takizawa, Iwate, Japan
- Height: 1.65 m (5 ft 5 in)
- Weight: 59 kg (130 lb)

Sport
- Country: Japan
- Sport: Wushu
Medal record
Men's wushu taolu
Representing Japan
Youth Olympic Games
Bronze medal – third place	2026 Dakar	Taijiquan combined
World Junior Wushu Championships
Gold medal – first place	2022 Tangerang	Taijiquan
Silver medal – second place	2022 Tangerang	Taijijian

Shiki Kawamura (川村 心輝, Kawamura Shiki; born 9 June 2009) is a Japanese wushu athlete specializing in the taolu discipline, specifically taijiquan and taijishan. He represented Japan as the sole wushu athlete at the 2026 Summer Youth Olympics in Dakar, Senegal, where wushu made its historical debut as an Olympic medal event.

== Early life ==
Kawamura was born and raised in Takizawa, Iwate Prefecture. He began practicing wushu taolu at the age of six after attending a local martial arts trial experience session with his mother. He attends Iwate Prefectural Shiwa Sogo High School.

== Career ==
Kawamura trains with the Iwate Taijiquan Association. He established himself early on the international junior circuit by competing at the 8th World Junior Wushu Championships in Tangerang, Indonesia, where he scored 8.92 to secure the gold medal in the Group B Boys' taijiquan division.

In March 2026, Kawamura competed at the 10th World Junior Wushu Championships held in Tianjin, China. He claimed the silver medal in the men's junior taijiquan division, an achievement that cemented his selection as the singular domestic athlete chosen to represent Team Japan in wushu at the Youth Olympic Games.

In late 2026, Kawamura traveled to Dakar, Senegal, for the 2026 Summer Youth Olympics. Coached by national director Kong Xiangdong, he contested the historic men's taijiquan & taijishan combined event at the Dakar Expo Centre. Following the preliminary segments, he expressed immense pride in introducing wushu on an official Olympic stage, stating his hope that the event would solidify wushu's status as a globally recognized sport.
