= Archery at the 2026 Summer Youth Olympics =

Archery at the IV Summer Youth Olympic Games
- Venue: Abdoulaye Wade Stadium
- Dates: 6–10 November
- No. of events: 3 (1 boys, 1 girls, 1 mixed)
- Competitors: 64 (32 boys, 32 girls) from 38 nations

Archery at the 2026 Summer Youth Olympics was held from 6 to 10 November. The event took place at Abdoulaye Wade Stadium in Diamniadio, Dakar, Senegal.

== Qualification ==
There were 64 quota places available in total, 32 per gender. To be eligible for one of them, World Archery set the following minimum requirements:

Continent	Distance	Boys	Girls
Continent	Distance	Points	Points
Europe	60 m	615	605
Americas	60 m	615	605
Asia	60 m	615	605
Oceania	60 m	615	605
Africa	60 m	554	545

=== Qualification summary ===
The detailed allocation of the available quotas was published by World Archery on 28 May 2026.

Continent	NOK	Boys	Girls	Mixed
Africa	Algeria	Yes	Yes	Yes
Africa	Egypt	Yes	Yes	Yes
Africa	Guinea	Yes	Yes	Yes
Africa	Ivory Coast	Yes	Yes	Yes
Africa	Mauritius	Yes	No	No
Africa	Senegal	Yes	Yes	Yes
Africa	South Africa	Yes	Yes	Yes
Africa	Tunisia	Yes	Yes	Yes
Europe	Bulgaria	No	Yes	No
Europe	Croatia	Yes	No	No
Europe	Czech Republic	No	Yes	No
Europe	France	Yes	Yes	Yes
Europe	Georgia	Yes	No	No
Europe	Germany	Yes	Yes	Yes
Europe	Great Britain	Yes	Yes	Yes
Europe	Israel	Yes	Yes	Yes
Europe	Italy	Yes	Yes	Yes
Europe	Netherlands	No	Yes	No
Europe	Poland	Yes	No	No
Europe	Slovakia	Yes	Yes	Yes
Europe	Slovenia	Yes	Yes	Yes
Europe	Spain	Yes	Yes	Yes
Europe	Switzerland	Yes	Yes	Yes
Europe	Turkey	Yes	Yes	Yes
Americas	Brazil	No	Yes	No
Americas	Canada	Yes	Yes	Yes
Americas	Colombia	Yes	Yes	Yes
Americas	Mexico	Yes	Yes	Yes
Americas	United States	Yes	Yes	Yes
Asia	Chinese Taipei	Yes	No	No
Asia	India	No	Yes	No
Asia	Japan	Yes	Yes	Yes
Asia	Singapore	No	Yes	No
Asia	South Korea	Yes	Yes	Yes
Asia	United Arab Emirates	Yes	Yes	Yes
Asia	Uzbekistan	Yes	No	No
Oceania	Australia	Yes	Yes	Yes
Oceania	New Zealand	Yes	Yes	Yes

== Medal summary ==
=== Medal table ===
* Host nation (Senegal)

Rank	NOC	Gold	Silver	Bronze	Total
1	France	1	1	0	2
1	United States	1	1	0	2
3	Turkey	1	0	0	1
4	Chinese Taipei	0	1	0	1
5	South Korea	0	0	2	2
6	Spain	0	0	1	1
Totals (6 entries)		3	3	3	9

=== Medalists ===
Event	Gold	Silver	Bronze
Men's individual	Maël Lamouret; France	Chen Pin-an; Chinese Taipei	Lee Ji-ho; South Korea
Women's individual	Dünya Yenihayat; Turkey	Ye-eun Whang; United States	Sandra Pérez; Spain
Mixed team	Ye-eun Whang; Aarya Arun; United States	Aurane Lapouge; Maël Lamouret; France	Kim Su-min; Lee Ji-ho; South Korea
