= Badminton at the 2026 Summer Youth Olympics =

Badminton at the IV Summer Youth Olympic Games
- Venue: Dakar Arena
- Dates: 1–5 November
- No. of events: 2
- Competitors: 63 from 45 nations

The badminton tournaments at the 2026 Summer Youth Olympics was held from 1 to 5 November. The events took place at Dakar Arena in Diamniadio, Senegal. The maximum age of participants would be 17 years old up to the closing ceremony of the Games.

== Qualification ==
=== Qualification summary ===
The following National Olympic Committees received a quota place:

Continent	NOC	Boy	Girl
Africa	Algeria	Yes	Yes
Africa	Egypt	Yes	Yes
Africa	Ghana	Yes	No
Africa	Mauritius	Yes	Yes
Africa	South Africa	Yes	No
Africa	Senegal	Yes	Yes
Africa	Uganda	No	Yes
Africa	Zambia	No	Yes
Europe	Bulgaria	Yes	Yes
Europe	Czech Republic	Yes	No
Europe	Denmark	Yes	Yes
Europe	Estonia	No	Yes
Europe	Finland	No	Yes
Europe	France	Yes	Yes
Europe	Great Britain	No	Yes
Europe	Germany	Yes	No
Europe	Greece	Yes	No
Europe	Ireland	No	Yes
Europe	Portugal	No	Yes
Europe	Serbia	Yes	No
Europe	Sweden	Yes	No
Europe	Ukraine	No	Yes
Americas	Brazil	Yes	No
Americas	Canada	Yes	Yes
Americas	Mexico	No	Yes
Americas	Trinidad and Tobago	No	Yes
Americas	United States	Yes	Yes
Americas	Venezuela	Yes	No
Asia	China	Yes	Yes
Asia	Hong Kong	No	Yes
Asia	Indonesia	Yes	Yes
Asia	India	Yes	Yes
Asia	Iran	Yes	Yes
Asia	Japan	No	Yes
Asia	South Korea	Yes	Yes
Asia	Malaysia	Yes	No
Asia	Singapore	Yes	No
Asia	Sri Lanka	No	Yes
Asia	Thailand	Yes	Yes
Asia	Chinese Taipei	Yes	Yes
Asia	Turkey	Yes	No
Asia	United Arab Emirates	Yes	No
Asia	Vietnam	Yes	No
Oceania	Australia	Yes	Yes
Oceania	New Zealand	Yes	Yes

== Medal summary ==
=== Medal table ===
* Host nation (Senegal)

Rank	Nation	Gold	Silver	Bronze	Total
1	China	1	0	1	2
2	United Arab Emirates	1	0	0	1
3	France	0	1	0	1
3	India	0	1	0	1
5	Japan	0	0	1	1
Totals (5 entries)		2	2	2	6

=== Events ===
Event	Gold	Silver	Bronze
Men's singles	Riyan Malhan; United Arab Emirates	Mady Sow; France	Hong Tianyue; China
Women's singles	Zhang Yixin; China	Tanvi Patri; India	Yuzuno Watanabe; Japan
