= Skateboarding at the 2026 Summer Youth Olympics – Women's street =

Women's street at the IV Summer Youth Olympic Games
- Skateboarding pictogram
- Venue: Complexe Tour de l'Oeuf
- Dates: 5 November 2026
- Competitors: 12 from 12 nations
- Winning score: 149.82

Medalists
1st place, gold medalist(s)		Zhu Yuanling	China
2nd place, silver medalist(s)		Duda Ribeiro	Brazil
3rd place, bronze medalist(s)		Evie Pritchard	Canada

The women's street competition at the 2026 Summer Youth Olympics took place on 5 November at the Complexe Tour de l'Oeuf in Dakar, Senegal.

== Competition format ==
The competition consisted of two 45-second runs followed by three single trick attempts in the qualification round. Only the highest-scoring run and the highest-scoring single trick were counted towards each skateboarder's total score. The total score was calculated by adding the highest run score and the highest trick score.

The qualification round consisted of two heats, with the top six skateboarders in the overall ranking advancing to the final.

In the final, the six qualified skateboarders performed three runs followed by three single trick attempts. The highest-scoring run and the highest-scoring single trick were combined to determine the final score and medal positions.

== Results ==
=== Qualification ===
The qualification round was held on 5 November 2026. The top six skateboarders advanced to the final.

Rank	Heat	Athlete	Nationality	Run		Trick			Total	Notes
Rank	Heat	Athlete	Nationality	1	2	1	2	3	Total	Notes
1	1	Duda Ribeiro	Brazil	45.72	61.43	68.20	73.31	0.00	134.74	Q
2	2	Esmeralda Butler	Puerto Rico	62.45	50.41	66.24	69.30	72.14	134.59	Q
3	1	Zhu Yuanling	China	53.94	60.83	72.13	69.17	0.00	132.96	Q
4	1	Evie Pritchard	Canada	58.34	59.95	58.40	62.35	0.00	122.30	Q
5	2	Laura Žáčková	Czech Republic	24.61	39.65	0.00	74.23	0.00	113.88	Q
6	1	Mariia Ozhigova	Russia	17.86	36.30	63.24	69.57	72.28	108.58	Q
7	2	Lucie Schoonheere	France	38.45	7.53	69.45	0.00	0.00	107.90	
8	2	Ella Ledingham	Australia	28.67	35.35	0.00	51.19	0.00	86.54	
9	2	Julieta Araya	Chile	22.25	22.77	57.25	0.00	0.00	80.02	
10	2	Majo Cabrera	Mexico	24.64	19.80	0.00	50.11	54.15	78.79	
11	1	Noura Amghar	Morocco	9.62	25.50	0.00	0.00	0.00	25.50	
12	1	Julia Plaggenborg	Bulgaria	12.22	6.14	0.00	0.00	5.97	18.19	

=== Final ===
Rank	Athlete	Nationality	Run			Trick			Total
Rank	Athlete	Nationality	1	2	3	1	2	3	Total
1st place, gold medalist(s)	Zhu Yuanling	China	25.72	17.84	67.44	74.71	0.00	82.38	149.82
2nd place, silver medalist(s)	Duda Ribeiro	Brazil	62.21	64.64	43.93	73.64	0.00	0.00	138.28
3rd place, bronze medalist(s)	Evie Pritchard	Canada	42.30	43.72	65.26	0.00	72.53	0.00	137.79
4	Mariia Ozhigova	Russia	16.92	21.68	53.15	63.27	0.00	0.00	116.42
5	Esmeralda Butler	Puerto Rico	14.76	40.96	27.89	68.18	0.00	0.00	109.14
6	Laura Žáčková	Czech Republic	42.79	22.12	33.80	0.00	0.00	0.00	42.79
