= Canada at the 2026 Summer Youth Olympics =

- Flag of Canada
- IOC code: CAN
- NOC: Canadian Olympic Committee
- Website: www.olympic.ca

in Dakar, Senegal October 31, 2026 – November 13, 2026
- Competitors: 28 in 10 sports
- Flag bearers (opening): Adam Burnett & Miranda Wei
- Flag bearers (closing): Simon Shan & Mehreen Khakh
- Medals Ranked 46th: Gold 1 Silver 1 Bronze 3 Total 5

Summer Youth Olympics appearances
- 2010; 2014; 2018; 2026

Canada competed at the 2026 Summer Youth Olympics in Dakar, Senegal from October 31 to November 13, 2026. This marked Canada's fourth appearance at the Youth Olympics, after making its debut in 2010.

A final team of 28 athletes (18 men and 10 women) competing in ten sports was named by the Canadian Olympic Committee on October 21, 2026.

Rugby sevens athlete Adam Burnett and wushu athlete Miranda Wei served as the country's flagbearers at the opening ceremony. Meanwhile, gold medalist fencer Simon Shan and bronze medalist boxer Mehreen Khakh were the country's closing ceremony flagbearers.

The Canadian delegation won five medals, one gold, one silver and three bronze.

== Competitors ==
The following is the list of number of competitors participating at the Games per sport/discipline.

Sport	Men	Women	Total
Archery	1	1	2
Artistic gymnastics	1	3	4
Badminton	1	1	2
Beach volleyball	0	2	2
Boxing	1	1	2
Fencing	1	0	1
Judo	1	0	1
Rugby sevens	12	0	12
Skateboarding	0	1	1
Wushu	0	1	1
Total	18	10	28

== Medallists ==
The following Canadian competitors won medals at the games. In the by discipline sections below, medallists' names are bolded.

Medal	Name(s)	Sport	Event	Date	Ref.
Gold	Simon Shan	Fencing	Men's épée	November 11	
Silver	Anes Mati	Judo	Men's 66 kg	November 1	
Bronze	Evie Pritchard	Skateboarding	Women's street	November 5	
Bronze	Mehreen Khakh	Boxing	Women's 51 kg	November 11	
Bronze	Lisandro García	Boxing	Men's 55 kg	November 11	

== Archery ==
Canada entered two archers, one of each gender. The team was officially named on September 25, 2026.

Athlete	Event	Ranking round		Round of 32	Round of 16	Quarterfinals	Semifinals	Final / BM	
Athlete	Event	Score	Seed	Opposition Score	Opposition Score	Opposition Score	Opposition Score	Opposition Score	Rank
Yashveer Bains	Men's individual	627	27	Basiladze (GEO); **W** 6–5	Gülay (TUR); **L** 4–6	Did not advance			
Alison Langley	Women's individual	609	25	Martini (AUS); **L** 4–6	Did not advance				
Yashveer Bains; Alison Langley	Mixed team	1236	21	—N/a	Did not advance				

== Artistic gymnastics ==
Canada entered four artistic gymnasts, one male and three female gymnasts. The team of four gymnasts was named on October 20, 2026.

Boys

Athlete	Event	Qualification								Final							
Athlete	Event	Apparatus						Total	Rank	Apparatus						Total	Rank
Athlete	Event	F	PH	R	V	PB	HB	Total	Rank	F	PH	R	V	PB	HB	Total	Rank
Jaydon de Silva	All-around	12.000	12.200	11.800	13.000	12.133	12.000	73.133	17 **Q**	Withdrew from final							

Girls
Team

Athlete	Event	Qualification						Final					
Athlete	Event	Apparatus				Total	Rank	Apparatus				Total	Rank
Athlete	Event	V	UB	BB	FX	Total	Rank	V	UB	BB	FX	Total	Rank
Taya Macy	Team	13.000	10.466	11.800	11.033	46.299	27	Withdrew from final					
Maryam Saber	Team			11.900	12.333	24.233		Withdrew from final					
Nikita Théodat	Team	13.300	11.700	11.666	12.766	49.432	11 **Q**	Withdrew from final					
**Total**	Team	26.300	22.166	23.700	25.099	97.265	5 **Q**	Withdrew from final					

Individual all-around

Athlete	Event	Final					
Athlete	Event	Apparatus				Total	Rank
Athlete	Event	V	UB	BB	FX	Total	Rank
Nikita Théodat	All-around	13.266	12.033	10.433	12.766	48.498	11

Mixed
Mixed team

Athlete	Event	Final																				
Athlete	Event	Round 1							Round 2							Round 3						
Athlete	Event	Apparatus					Total	Rank	Apparatus					Total	Rank	Apparatus					Total	Rank
Athlete	Event	F	PB	HB	UB	BB	Total	Rank	F	PB	HB	UB	BB	Total	Rank	F	PB	HB	UB	BB	Total	Rank
Jaydon de Silva	Mixed team	12.733	—N/a				24.533	10	did not advance													
Nikita Théodat	Mixed team	—N/a			11.800	—N/a	24.533	10	did not advance													

== Badminton ==
Canada entered two badminton athletes (one per gender). The team was officially unveiled on October 21, 2026.

Athlete	Event	Group stage				Elimination	Quarterfinal	Semifinal	Final / BM	
Athlete	Event	Opposition Score	Opposition Score	Opposition Score	Rank	Opposition Score	Opposition Score	Opposition Score	Opposition Score	Rank
Shaurya Gullaiya	Men's singles	Briza (CZE); **W** 2–0 (21–15, 21–12)	Diagne (SEN); **W** 2–0 (21–11, 21–11)	Ruparelia (IND); **L** 1–2 (23–25, 19–21, 11–21)	2	Did not advance				
Emily Luo	Women's singles	Yau (HKG); **L** 0–2 (8–21, 7–21)	Mohamed (EGY); **W** 2–0 (21–7, 21–11)	Bhardwaj (ZAM); **W** 2–0 (21–3, 21–4)	2	Did not advance				

== Beach volleyball ==
Canada entered a women's pair.

Athletes	Event	Preliminary round				Lucky loser	Round of 16	Quarterfinal	Semifinal	Final / BM	
Athletes	Event	Opposition Score	Opposition Score	Opposition Score	Rank	Opposition Score	Opposition Score	Opposition Score	Opposition Score	Opposition Score	Rank
Natalia Casas; Julia McDougall	Women's tournament	Gomez Martinez / Martinez (PAR); **W** 2–1 (20–22, 21–18, 15–8)	Ming / Siyu (CHN); **W** 2–1 (21–19, 22–24, 15–12)	Saidy / Sanneh (GAM); **W** 2–0 (21–8, 21–8)	1 **Q**	Bye	Charissaki / Margaritopolou (GRE); **L** 0–2 (15–21, 16–21)	Did not advance			

== Boxing ==
Canada entered two boxers, one per gender.

Athlete	Weight	Round of 16	Quarterfinals	Semifinals	Final / BM	
Athlete	Weight	Opposition Result	Opposition Result	Opposition Result	Opposition Result	Rank
**Lisandro García**	Men's 55 kg	Parihiala (FIN); **W** 5–0	Sanyang (GAM); **W** 5–0	Ismailov (GEO); **L** WO	Did not advance	3rd place, bronze medalist(s)
**Mehreen Khakh**	Women's 51 kg	Bye	Masaba (BOT); **W** RSC	Huseynova (AZE); **L** 0–5	Did not advance	3rd place, bronze medalist(s)

== Fencing ==
Canada entered one male fencer.

Athlete	Event	Pool Round		Round of 16	Quarterfinals	Semifinals	Final	
Athlete	Event	Victories	Seed	Opposition Score	Opposition Score	Opposition Score	Opposition Score	Rank
**Simon Shan**	Men's epée	5**V**–1**D**	3 **Q**	Bye	Plazas (COL); **W** 15–6	Van Laecke (BEL); **W** 15–10	Rađenović (SRB); **W** 15–9	1st place, gold medalist(s)

== Judo ==
Canada entered one male judoka.

Athlete	Event	Round of 16	Quarterfinals	Semifinals	Repechage	Final / BM	
Athlete	Event	Opposition Result	Opposition Result	Opposition Result	Opposition Result	Opposition Result	Rank
**Anes Mati**	Men's 66 kg	Bye	Carvallo (ARG); **W** 101–000	Gbingbehi (FRA); **W** 100–000	Bye	Heydarov (UKR); **L** 000s3–100	2nd place, silver medalist(s)

== Rugby sevens ==
Canada entered a men's rugby team of 12 athletes.

Team	Event	Group stage				Semifinal	Final / BM	
Team	Event	Opposition Score	Opposition Score	Opposition Score	Rank	Opposition Score	Opposition Score	Rank
Canadian U18 Men	Men's tournament	Germany; **W** 17–13	South Africa; **L** 17–24	Senegal; **W** 40–0	2 **Q**	France; **L** 0–58	Argentina; **L** 5–35	4

=== Men's tournament ===
Roster
Canada's roster consisted of 12 athletes.

- Austin Andrews
- Travis Altmann
- Mason Balzer
- Adam Burnett
- Nolan Grealy
- Samuel Knowlton
- Dekker Kozak-Goebel
- Elliot MacDonald
- William North
- Luca Robb
- Theodore Schaddelee
- Jonas Van Gilst

== Skateboarding ==
Canada entered one female skateboarder.

Athlete	Event	Qualification		Final	
Athlete	Event	Result	Rank	Result	Rank
**Evie Prichard**	Women's Street	122.30	4 **Q**	137.79	3rd place, bronze medalist(s)

== Wushu ==
Canada entered one female wushu athlete.

Athlete	Event	Taijishan routine		Taijiquan routine		Total Points	Rank	Taijishan routine		Taijiquan routine		Total Points	Rank
Athlete	Event	Points	Rank	Points	Rank	Total Points	Rank	Points	Rank	Points	Rank	Total Points	Rank
Miranda Wei	Women's taijiquan combined	9.173	4	9.186	6	18.359	5 **Q**	9.093	5	9.053	6	18.146	6

== See also ==
- Canada at the 2026 Commonwealth Games
- Canada at the 2028 Summer Olympics
