= Megan Nieman =

South African athlete (born 2009)

Personal information
- Born: 12 January 2009 (age 17)

Sport
- Sport: Athletics
- Event: Hurdles

Achievements and titles
- Personal bests: 100 mH: 13.26 (2026); 400 mH: 56.54 (2026)
Medal record
Women's athletics
Representing South Africa
Youth Olympic Games
Gold medal – first place	2026 Dakar	400 m hurdles
African U18 Championships
Gold medal – first place	2025 Abeokuta	100 m hurdles
Silver medal – second place	2025 Abeokuta	400 m hurdles

Megan Nieman (born 12 January 2009) is a South African hurdler. She won the gold medal in the 400 metres hurdles at the 2026 Summer Youth Olympics. She previously won the gold medal over 100 metres hurdles and the silver medal in the 400 metres hurdles at the 2025 African U18 Championships.

== Career ==
Educated at Hoërskool Menlopark in Pretoria, Nieman is a member of member of Athletics Gauteng North (AGN), and is coached by JJ Smith and Irma Reyneke. She won the gold medal over 100 metres hurdles and the silver medal in the 400 metres hurdles at the 2025 African U18 Championships in Abeokuta, Nigeria in July 2025. That September, she ran 13.10 seconds for the 100 metres hurdles in Potchefstroom, making her the third fastest U18 women's 100 m hurdler in the world for 2025 behind only Italy's Alessia Succo and Jamaican Tiana Marshall.

Nieman set a South African U18 national record of 56.67 seconds for the 400 metres hurdles in Tshwane in February 2026. The following month at the ASA Age Group Championships in Ekurhuleni, on 28 March 2026, she lowered the record in winning the U18 girls 400 m hurdles final in 56.64 seconds. Nieman had been disqualified for a false start in the 100 m hurdles heats earlier in the week. In April 2026, she ran 13.26 seconds (+0.8) to place sixth in the 100 m hurdles at the Simbine Classic in South Africa. In August, Nieman was a semi-finalist in both the 100 m hurdles and 400 m hurdles at the 2026 World Athletics U20 Championships. In November, she won the gold medal in the 400 m hurdles at the 2026 Summer Youth Olympics in Dakar.
