= Julian Jeang-Agliardi =

American skateboarder (born 2009)

Personal information
- Born: December 22, 2009 (age 16)

Sport
- Country: United States
- Sport: Skateboarding
- Event: Street
Medal record
Men's skateboarding
Representing the United States
X Games
Bronze medal – third place	2025 Salt Lake City	Street
Bronze medal – third place	2026 New Orleans	Street best trick
Youth Olympic Games
Gold medal – first place	2026 Dakar	Street

Julian Jeang-Agliardi (born December 22, 2009) is an American skateboarder. He represented the United States at the 2026 Summer Youth Olympics.

== Early life ==
Jeang-Agliardi was born to a French father and a Chinese-American mother. He began skateboarding after a homeless guy handed him a skateboard while walking along the Long Beach Pier in Long Beach, California.

== Career ==
In July 2022, he was selected to compete on The Camp Woodward Show with Ryan Sheckler.

He made his X Games debut at X Games Osaka 2025. A week later he competed at X Games Salt Lake City and won a bronze medal in the street event. In July 2026, he competed at X Games New Orleans and won a bronze medal in the street best trick event. In February 2026, during the Street League Skateboarding (SLS) Championship Tour in Sydney, Australia, he won a silver medal.

In November 2026, he represented the United States at the 2026 Summer Youth Olympics and won a gold medal in the street event with a score of 143.23 points. This was the United States' first medal of the 2026 Youth Olympics.
