= Jeon Yuju =

South Korean fencer (born 2011)

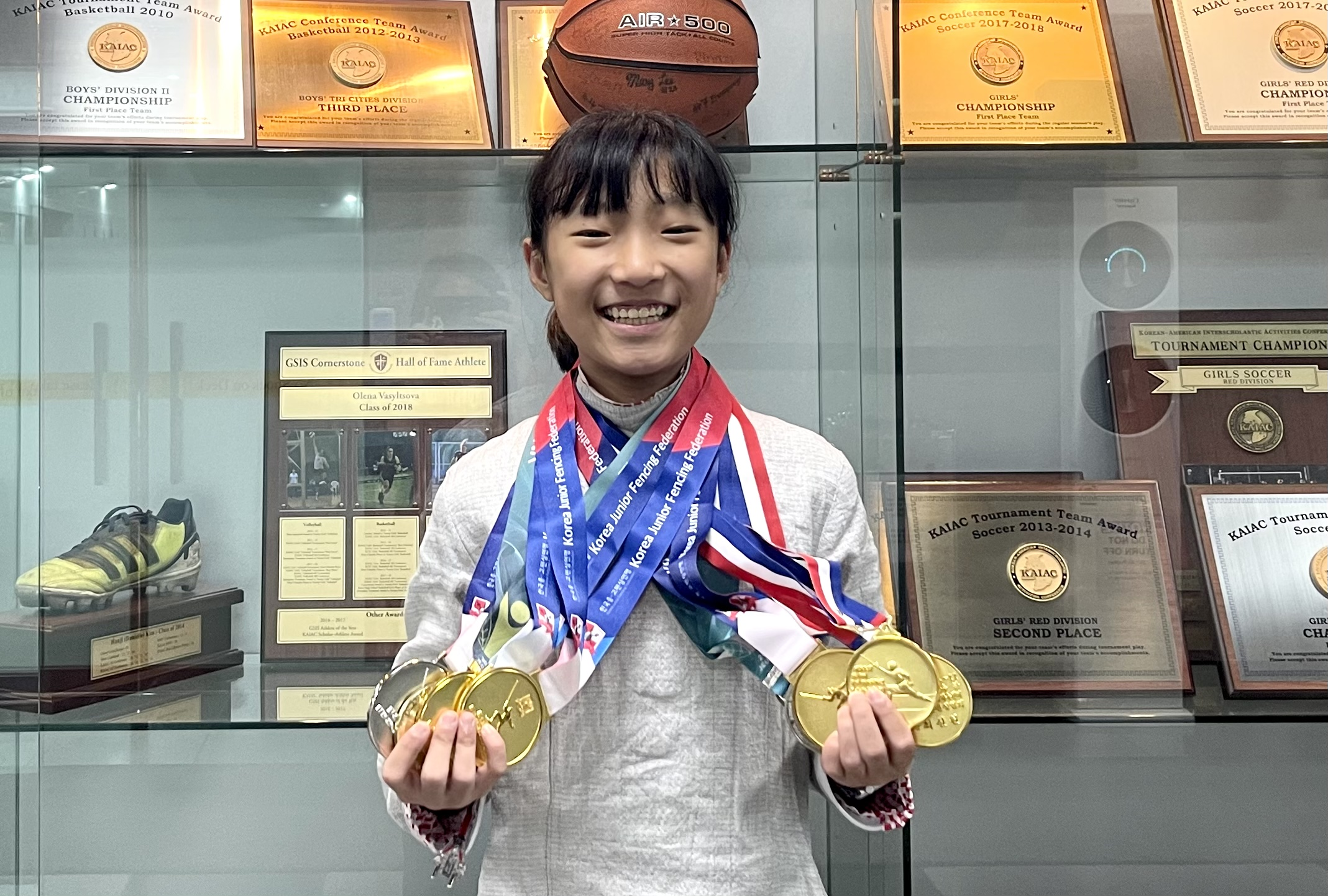
- Jeon with medals in 2024

Personal information
- Nationality: South Korea
- Born: 전유주; 9 July 2011 (age 14) Seoul, South Korea

Sport
- Sport: Fencing

Jeon Yuju (Korean: 전유주; born 9 July 2011) is a South Korean female fencer. In 2025, she was selected as the youngest national youth representative and has won medals at various international competitions.

== Career ==
Jeon Yuju won the Gyeonggi Province selection trials for the 53rd National Youth Sports Festival in 2024, earning her first national competition appearance. There, she secured second place in the individual event and led the Gyeonggi team to victory in the team event.

In July 2024, she consecutively won the 53rd President's Cup National Fencing Championships and the 52nd Minister of Culture, Sports and Tourism National Junior and Senior High School Fencing Championships.

In August, she won the women's sabre cadet division at the 2024 International Youth Fencing Circuit (IRC) in China. In October, she became the youngest gold medalist in Division II at the 2024 North American Cup (NAC), surpassing high school and college athletes.

In 2025, selected as a South Korean national representative, she competed in the Asian Fencing Championships, earning a bronze medal in the individual under-17 category and a bronze in the team event. Later, she won the gold medal in the women's under-14 sabre individual event at the 2025 North American Cup.
