= United Arab Emirates at the 2026 Summer Youth Olympics =

- Flag of United Arab Emirates
- IOC code: UAE
- NOC: United Arab Emirates National Olympic Committee
- Website: www.uaenoc.net

in Dakar, Senegal October 31, 2026 – November 13, 2026
- Competitors: 13 in 10 sports
- Flag bearers: Alya Almheiri & Hamdan Almaazmi
- Medals: Gold 1 Silver 0 Bronze 0 Total 1

Summer Youth Olympics appearances
- 2010; 2014; 2018; 2026

United Arab Emirates is scheduled to compete at the 2026 Summer Youth Olympics in Dakar, Senegal from October 31 to November 13, 2026. This will mark United Arab Emirates's fourth appearance at the Youth Olympics, after making its debut in 2010.

Equestrian Alya Almheiri and judoka Hamdan Almaazmi served as the flag bearers for the opening ceremony.

== Competitors ==
The following is the list of number of competitors participating at the Games per sport/discipline.

Sport	Men	Women	Total
Archery	1	1	2
Athletics	1	2	3
Badminton	1	0	1
Boxing	1	0	1
Equestrian	0	1	1
Fencing	1	0	1
Judo	1	0	1
Road cycling	1	0	1
Swimming	1	0	1
Triathlon	0	1	1
Total	8	5	13

== Archery ==
United Arab Emirates entered two archers, one of each gender.

Athlete	Event	Ranking Round		Round of 16	Quarterfinals	Semifinals	Final / BM	Rank
Athlete	Event	Score	Seed	Opposition Score	Opposition Score	Opposition Score	Opposition Score	Rank
Khalifa Alkaabi	Men's individual							
Huda Alali	Women's individual							
Khalifa Alkaabi; Huda Alali	Mixed team							

== Athletics ==
United Arab Emirated entered three athletes, one male and two female.

=== Track & road events ===
Men

Athlete	Event	Semifinal		Final			
Athlete	Event	Result	Rank	Result	Rank	Result	Rank
Saeed Omar	400 m						

Women

Athlete	Event	Heat		Semifinal		Final	
Athlete	Event	Result	Rank	Result	Rank	Result	Rank
Arwa Ali	100 m						
Aisha Muhammed	400 m						

== Badminton ==
United Arab Emirates entered one male athlete.

Athlete	Event	Round of 16	Quarterfinals	Semifinals	Final / BM	
Athlete	Event	Opposition Result	Opposition Result	Opposition Result	Opposition Result	Rank
Riyan Malhan	Men's singles					

== Boxing ==
United Arab Emirates entered one male athlete in the −70 kg category.

Men

Athlete	Weight	Round of 16	Quarterfinals	Semifinals	Final / BM	
Athlete	Weight	Opposition Result	Opposition Result	Opposition Result	Opposition Result	Rank
Mohammed Moaaz	–70 kg					

== Equestrian ==
United Arab Emirates received a quota place as one of the four invited NOCs from Asia.

Athlete	Horse	Event	Qualification		Final			Jump-Off		
Athlete	Horse	Event	Penalties	Rank	Penalties	Time	Rank	Penalties	Time	Rank
Alya Almheiri		Individual jumping								

== Fencing ==
United Arab Emirates entered one male athlete.

Athlete	Event	Round of 64	Round of 32	Round of 16	Quarterfinal	Semifinal	Final / BM	
Athlete	Event	Opposition Score	Opposition Score	Opposition Score	Opposition Score	Opposition Score	Opposition Score	Rank
Mohamed Alobeidli	Men's epée							

== Judo ==
United Arab Emirates entered one male judoka based on the available quotas assigned by the International Judo Federation.

Men

Athlete	Event	Round of 16	Quarterfinals	Semifinals	Repechage	Final / BM	
Athlete	Event	Opposition Result	Opposition Result	Opposition Result	Opposition Result	Opposition Result	Rank
Hamdan Almaazmi	–81 kg						

== Road cycling ==
United Arab Emirates entered one male athlete.

Men

Athlete	Event	Time	Rank
Sultan Alhammadi	Road race		
Sultan Alhammadi	Time trial		

== Swimming ==
United Arab Emirates entered one male swimmer.

Athlete	Event	Heat		Semifinal		Final	
Athlete	Event	Time	Rank	Time	Rank	Time	Rank
Abdulla Alamer	100 m freestyle						
Abdulla Alamer	100 m backstroke						

== Triathlon ==
United Arab Emirates entered one female athlete.

Athlete	Event	Time						Rank
Athlete	Event	Swim (750m)	Trans 1	Bike (20km)	Trans 2	Run (5km)	Total	Rank
Charlotte Thurston	Women's individual							
