= South Korea at the 2026 Summer Youth Olympics =

- Flag of South Korea
- IOC code: KOR
- NOC: Korean Sport & Olympic Committee
- Website: www.sports.or.kr

in Dakar, Senegal October 31, 2026 – November 13, 2026
- Competitors: 18 in 12 sports
- Flag bearers: Kim Seung-won & Park Jung-bin
- Medals: Gold 0 Silver 2 Bronze 0 Total 2

Summer Youth Olympics appearances (overview)
- 2010; 2014; 2018; 2026

South Korea is scheduled to compete at the 2026 Summer Youth Olympics in Dakar, Senegal from October 31 to November 13, 2026. This will mark South Korea's fourth appearance at the Youth Olympics, after making its debut in 2010.

Swimmer Kim Seung-won and badminton player Park Jung-bin served as the flag bearers for the opening ceremony.

== Competitors ==
The following is the list of number of competitors participating at the Games per sport/discipline.

Sport	Men	Women	Total
Archery	1	1	2
Athletics	1	1	2
Badminton	1	1	2
Boxing	0	1	1
Breaking	0	1	1
Fencing	0	1	1
Judo	0	1	1
Swimming	1	1	2
Table tennis	1	1	2
Taekwondo	1	1	2
Triathlon	0	1	1
Wushu	1	0	1
Total	7	11	18

== Archery ==
South Korea entered two archers, one of each gender.

Athlete	Event	Ranking Round		Round of 32	Round of 16	Quarterfinals	Semifinals	Final / BM	Rank
Athlete	Event	Score	Seed	Opposition Score	Opposition Score	Opposition Score	Opposition Score	Opposition Score	Rank
Lee Ji-ho	Men's individual	683	5	Oosthuizen (RSA); W 7–1	Conrad (GER); W 6–0	Arun (USA); W 6–4	Chen (TPE); L 4–6	Ezzeldin (EGY); W 6–2	3rd place, bronze medalist(s)
Kim Su-min	Women's individual	688	2						
Lee Ji-ho; Kim Su-min	Mixed team	1371	1						

== Athletics ==
South Korea entered two athletes, one of each gender.

Track events

Athlete	Event	Semi-finals		Final	
Athlete	Event	Result	Rank	Result	Rank
Kim Seo-hyun	Women's 100 m hurdles	15.11	6	Did not advance	

Field events

Athlete	Event	Final	
Athlete	Event	Result	Rank
Lee Soo-hwan	Men's shot put		

== Badminton ==
South Korea entered two athletes, one of each gender.

Athlete	Event	Round of 16	Quarterfinals	Semifinals	Final / BM	
Athlete	Event	Opposition Result	Opposition Result	Opposition Result	Opposition Result	Rank
Park Jung-bin	Men's singles					
Janh Yu-jeong	Women's singles					

== Boxing ==
South Korea entered one female athlete in the −54 kg category.

Women

Athlete	Weight	Round of 16	Quarterfinals	Semifinals	Final / BM	
Athlete	Weight	Opposition Result	Opposition Result	Opposition Result	Opposition Result	Rank
Kim Ye-rin	–54 kg					

== Breaking ==
South Korea entered one female athlete.

Athlete	Nickname	Event	Group Stage			Quarterfinal	Semifinal	Final / BM	
Athlete	Nickname	Event	Round	Votes	Rank	Opposition Result	Opposition Result	Opposition Result	Rank
	Minji	B-Girls							

== Fencing ==
South Korea entered one female athlete.

Athlete	Event	Round of 64	Round of 32	Round of 16	Quarterfinal	Semifinal	Final / BM	
Athlete	Event	Opposition Score	Opposition Score	Opposition Score	Opposition Score	Opposition Score	Opposition Score	Rank
Jeon Yuju	Women's sabre							

== Judo ==
South Korea entered one female judoka based on the available quotas assigned by the International Judo Federation.

Women

Athlete	Event	Round of 16	Quarterfinals	Semifinals	Repechage	Final / BM	
Athlete	Event	Opposition Result	Opposition Result	Opposition Result	Opposition Result	Opposition Result	Rank
Kwak Yuju	–63 kg						

== Swimming ==
South Korea entered two swimmers, one male and one female.

Athlete	Event	Heat		Semifinal		Final	
Athlete	Event	Time	Rank	Time	Rank	Time	Rank
Lee Jihoo	50 m freestyle						
Lee Jihoo	100 m freestyle						
Lee Jihoo	200 m freestyle						
Kim Seung-won	50 m backstroke						
Kim Seung-won	100 m backstroke						

== Table tennis ==
South Korea entered two athletes (one male and one female).

Athlete	Event	Group stage				Round of 32	Round of 16	Quarterfinal	Semifinal	Final	
Athlete	Event	Opposition Result	Opposition Result	Opposition Result	Rank	Opposition Result	Opposition Result	Opposition Result	Opposition Result	Opposition Result	Rank
Lee Seung-soo	Men's singles					—N/a					3rd place, bronze medalist(s)
Heo Ye-rim	Women's singles					—N/a					
Lee Seung-soo; Heo Ye-rim	Mixed doubles	—N/a									

== Taekwondo ==
South Korea entered two athletes, one of each gender.

Men

Athlete	Event	Round of 16	Quarterfinals	Semifinals	Repechage	Final / BM	
Athlete	Event	Opposition Result	Opposition Result	Opposition Result	Opposition Result	Opposition Result	Rank
Jang Jun-won	–73 kg						

Women

Athlete	Event	Round of 16	Quarterfinals	Semifinals	Repechage	Final / BM	
Athlete	Event	Opposition Result	Opposition Result	Opposition Result	Opposition Result	Opposition Result	Rank
Lee Siwoo	–49 kg						

== Triathlon ==
South Korea entered one female athlete.

Athlete	Event	Time						Rank
Athlete	Event	Swim (750m)	Trans 1	Bike (20km)	Trans 2	Run (5km)	Total	Rank
Bae Eunsol	Women's individual							

== Wushu ==
South Korea entered one male athlete after quotas were assigned by the International Wushu Federation.

Athlete	Event	Changquan routine		Gunshu routine		Total Points	Final Rank
Athlete	Event	Points	Rank	Points	Rank	Total Points	Final Rank
Lee Yoon-sang	Men's changquan combined						
