= Mauritius at the 2026 Summer Youth Olympics =

- Flag of Mauritius
- IOC code: MRI
- NOC: Mauritius Olympic Committee

in Dakar, Senegal October 31, 2026 – November 13, 2026
- Competitors: 10 in 8 sports
- Flag bearers: Elsa How Hong and Alexandre Aime
- Medals: Gold 0 Silver 0 Bronze 0 Total 0

Summer Youth Olympics appearances
- 2010; 2014; 2018; 2026

Mauritius is competing at the 2026 Summer Youth Olympics in Dakar, Senegal, from October 31 to November 13, 2026. This marks Mauritius's fourth appearance at the Youth Olympics, after making its debut in 2010.

Badminton player Elsa How Hong and fencer Alexandre Aime served as the flag bearers for the opening ceremony.

== Competitors ==
The following is the list of number of competitors participating at the Games per sport/discipline.

Sport	Men	Women	Total
Archery	1	0	1
Athletics	1	0	1
Badminton	1	1	2
Boxing	2	0	2
Fencing	1	0	1
Judo	1	0	1
Road cycling	1	0	1
Triathlon	0	1	1
Total	8	2	10

== Archery ==
Mauritius entered one male archer.

Men

Athlete	Event	Ranking Round		Round of 16	Quarterfinals	Semifinals	Final / BM	Rank
Athlete	Event	Score	Seed	Opposition Score	Opposition Score	Opposition Score	Opposition Score	Rank
Yugveer Bissessur	Individual							

== Athletics ==
Mauritius entered one male athlete.

=== Track & road events ===
Men

Athlete	Event	Semifinal		Final	
Athlete	Event	Result	Rank	Result	Rank
Brice Tailly	110 m hurdles				

== Badminton ==
Mauritius entered two athletes, one of each gender.

Athlete	Event	Group stage				Quarterfinal	Semifinal	Final / BM	
Athlete	Event	Opposition Score	Opposition Score	Opposition Score	Rank	Opposition Score	Opposition Score	Opposition Score	Rank
Leo Douce	Men's singles								
Elsa How Hong	Women's singles								

== Boxing ==
Mauritius entered two male athletes.

Men

Athlete	Weight	Round of 16	Quarterfinals	Semifinals	Final	
Athlete	Weight	Opposition Result	Opposition Result	Opposition Result	Opposition Result	Rank
Denzel Namaseevayen	–55 kg					
Jean Julian Agathe	–60 kg					

== Fencing ==
Mauritius entered one male athlete.

Men

Athlete	Event	Pool round		Round of 16	Quarterfinals	Semifinals	Final / BM	
Athlete	Event	Opposition Score	Seed	Opposition Score	Opposition Score	Opposition Score	Opposition Score	Rank
Alexandre Aime	Épée							

== Judo ==
Mauritius entered one male judoka based on the available quotas assigned by the International Judo Federation.

Men

Athlete	Event	Round of 16	Quarterfinals	Semifinals	Repechage 1	Repechage 2	Final	
Athlete	Event	Opposition Result	Opposition Result	Opposition Result	Opposition Result	Opposition Result	Opposition Result	Rank
Hayden Khenmah	–81 kg	Bye						

== Road cycling ==
Mauritius entered one male athlete.

Men

Athlete	Event	Time	Rank
Thomas Harel	Road race		
Thomas Harel	Time trial		

== Triathlon ==
Mauritius entered one female athlete.

Athlete	Event	Time						Rank
Athlete	Event	Swim (750m)	Trans 1	Bike (20km)	Trans 2	Run (5km)	Total	Rank
Keira Rajabalee	Women's individual							
