= New Zealand at the 2026 Summer Youth Olympics =

- Flag of New Zealand
- IOC code: NZL
- NOC: New Zealand Olympic Committee
- Website: www.olympic.org.nz

in Dakar, Senegal October 31, 2026 – November 13, 2026
- Competitors: 18 in 12 sports
- Flag bearers: Anzhuo Han & Ariel Muchirahondo
- Medals: Gold 2 Silver 1 Bronze 0 Total 3

Summer Youth Olympics appearances
- 2010; 2014; 2018; 2026

New Zealand is scheduled to compete at the 2026 Summer Youth Olympics in Dakar, Senegal, from 31 October to 13 November 2026. This will mark New Zealand's fourth appearance at the Youth Olympics, after making its debut in 2010.

Table tennis player Anzhuo Han and swimmer Ariel Muchirahondo served as the flag bearers for the opening ceremony.

== Competitors ==
The following is the list of number of competitors participating at the Games per sport/discipline.

Sport	Men	Women	Total
Archery	1	1	2
Artistic gymnastics	1	1	2
Badminton	1	1	2
Beach wrestling	1	0	1
Boxing	1	1	2
Equestrian	0	1	1
Fencing	0	1	1
Sailing	0	1	1
Swimming	1	1	2
Table tennis	1	1	2
Triathlon	1	0	1
Wushu	0	1	1
Total	8	10	18

== Archery ==
New Zealand entered two archers, one of each gender.

Athlete	Event	Ranking round		Round of 32	Round of 16	Quarterfinals	Semifinals	Final / BM	
Athlete	Event	Score	Seed	Opposition Score	Opposition Score	Opposition Score	Opposition Score	Opposition Score	Rank
Thornton Wallberg	Men's individual								
Ella Yang	Women's individual								
Thornton Wallberg; Ella Yang	Mixed team			—N/a					

== Artistic gymnastics ==
New Zealand entered two gymnasts, one of each gender.

Men
Individual

Athlete	Event	Qualification								Final							
Athlete	Event	Apparatus						Total	Rank	Apparatus						Total	Rank
Athlete	Event	F	PH	R	V	PB	HB	Total	Rank	F	PH	R	V	PB	HB	Total	Rank
William Davies	All-around	11.866	9.066	11.033	13.733	9.666	8.533	63.897	52	Did not qualify							

Women
Individual

Athlete	Event	Qualification						Final					
Athlete	Event	Apparatus				Total	Rank	Apparatus				Total	Rank
Athlete	Event	V	UB	BB	F	Total	Rank	V	UB	BB	F	Total	Rank
Ella Thomas	All-around	12.166	10.133	11.500	11.833	45.632	30	Did not qualify					

== Badminton ==
New Zealand entered two athletes, one of each gender.

Athlete	Event	Group stage				Quarter-final	Semi-final	Final / BM	
Athlete	Event	Opposition Score	Opposition Score	Opposition Score	Rank	Opposition Score	Opposition Score	Opposition Score	Rank
Tony Yu	Men's singles								
Amy Wang	Women's singles								

== Beach wrestling ==
New Zealand entered one male athlete.

Athlete	Event	Group Stage				Semifinal	Final / BM	
Athlete	Event	Opposition Result	Opposition Result	Opposition Result	Rank	Opposition Result	Opposition Result	Rank
Wairangi Sargent	Men's –70 kg							

== Boxing ==
New Zealand entered two athletes, one of each gender.

Athlete	Event	Round of 16	Quarterfinals	Semifinals	Final	
Athlete	Event	Opposition Result	Opposition Result	Opposition Result	Opposition Result	Rank
Huriwaka Dean	Men's flyweight					
Lea Newman	Women's flyweight					

== Equestrian ==
New Zealand received a quota place as one of the four invited NOCs from an intercontinenal group.

Athlete	Horse	Event	Qualification					Final	
Athlete	Horse	Event	Round 1		Round 2			Final	
Athlete	Horse	Event	Penalties	Rank	Penalties	Total	Rank	Penalties	Rank
Sofia Williams		Individual jumping							

== Fencing ==
New Zealand entered one female fencer.

Athlete	Event	Pool Round	Seed	Round of 16	Quarterfinals	Semifinals	Final / BM	Rank
Athlete	Event	Opposition Score	Seed	Opposition Score	Opposition Score	Opposition Score	Opposition Score	Rank
Bowie Wang	Women's foil							

== Sailing ==
New Zealand entered one female athlete.

Athlete	Event	Race															Net points	Final rank
Athlete	Event	1	2	3	4	5	6	7	8	9	10	11	12	13	14	15	Net points	Final rank
Honor Fyfe	Women's Techno 293+																	

== Swimming ==
New Zealand entered two swimmers, one male and one female.

Athlete	Event	Heats		Final	
Athlete	Event	Time	Rank	Time	Rank
Ariel Muchirahondo	Men's 200 m freestyle				
Ariel Muchirahondo	Men's 100 m backstroke				
Ariel Muchirahondo	Men's 200 m backstroke				
Ariel Muchirahondo	Men's 200 m individual medley				
Alyssa Lawson	Women's 50 m freestyle				
Alyssa Lawson	Women's 100 m freestyle				
Alyssa Lawson	Women's 200 m freestyle				
Alyssa Lawson	Women's 50 m backstroke				

== Table tennis ==
New Zealand entered two athletes (one male and one female).

Athlete	Event	Group Stage				Round of 32	Round of 16	Quarterfinal	Semifinal	Final	
Athlete	Event	Opposition Result	Opposition Result	Opposition Result	Rank	Opposition Result	Opposition Result	Opposition Result	Opposition Result	Opposition Result	Rank
August Xiao	Men's singles					—N/a					
Anzhuo Han	Women's singles					—N/a					
August Xiao; Anzhuo Han	Mixed doubles	—N/a									

== Triathlon ==
New Zealand entered one male athlete.

Athlete	Event	Time						Rank
Athlete	Event	Swim (750m)	Trans 1	Bike (20km)	Trans 2	Run (5km)	Total	Rank
Matthew More	Men's individual							

== Wushu ==
New Zealand entered one female athlete after quotas were assigned by the International Wushu Federation.

Athlete	Event	Preliminary						Final					
Athlete	Event	Event 1		Event 2		Total		Event 1		Event 2		Total	
Athlete	Event	Result	Rank	Result	Rank	Result	Rank	Result	Rank	Result	Rank	Result	Rank
Amber Zhuo	Women's changquan												

== See also ==
- New Zealand at the 2026 Winter Olympics
- New Zealand at the 2026 Commonwealth Games
