= Switzerland at the 2026 Summer Youth Olympics =

- Flag of Switzerland
- IOC code: SUI
- NOC: Swiss Olympic Association
- Website: www.swissolympic.ch

in Dakar, Senegal October 31, 2026 – November 13, 2026
- Competitors: 2 in 1 sport
- Medals: Gold 0 Silver 0 Bronze 2 Total 2

Summer Youth Olympics appearances
- 2010; 2014; 2018; 2026

Switzerland is scheduled to compete at the 2026 Summer Youth Olympics in Dakar, Senegal from October 31 to November 13, 2026. This will mark Switzerland's fourth appearance at the Youth Olympics, after making its debut in 2010.

== Competitors ==
The following is the list of number of competitors participating at the Games per sport/discipline.

Sport	Men	Women	Total
Archery	1	1	2
Total	1	1	2

== Archery ==
Switzerland entered two archers, one of each gender.
