= Turkey at the 2026 Summer Youth Olympics =

- Flag of Turkey
- IOC code: TUR
- NOC: Turkish Olympic Committee
- Website: www.olimpiyatkomitesi.org.tr

in Dakar, Senegal October 31, 2026 – November 13, 2026
- Competitors: 34 in 16 sports
- Flag bearers: Beren Başaran, Görkem Öçal
- Medals: Gold 1 Silver 0 Bronze 0 Total 1

Summer Youth Olympics appearances (overview)
- 2010; 2014; 2018; 2026

Turkey is scheduled to compete at the 2026 Summer Youth Olympics in Dakar, Senegal from October 31 to November 13, 2026. This will mark Turkey's fourth appearance at the Youth Olympics, after making its debut in 2010.

== Competitors ==
The following is the list of number of competitors participating at the Games per sport/discipline.

Sport	Boys	Girls	Total
Archery	1	1	2
Artistic gymnastics	1	0	1
Athletics	3	1	4
Badminton	1	0	1
Baseball	4	4	8
Beach volleyball	1	0	1
Boxing	1	1	2
Coastal rowing	1	1	2
Fencing	2	0	2
Judo	0	1	1
Sailing	0	1	1
Swimmimg	1	1	2
Table tennis	1	0	1
Taekwondo	2	2	4
Triathlon	0	1	1
Wushu	1	0	1
Total	20	14	34

== Archery ==
Turkey entered two archers, one of each gender.
