= Croatia at the Youth Olympics =

- IOC code: CRO
- NOC: Croatian Olympic Committee
- Website: www.hoo.hr (in Croatian and English)
- Medals Ranked 40th: Gold 7 Silver 7 Bronze 4 Total 18

Summer appearances
- 2010; 2014; 2018; 2026

Winter appearances
- 2012; 2016; 2020; 2024

Croatia competed at the Youth Olympic Games for the first time in 2010, and has participated in every Games since then.

The National Olympic Committee for Croatia is the Croatian Olympic Committee, which was created in 1991 and recognized in 1993.

Croatian athletes have won 18 medals at Summer Youth Games, swimming being the most successful sport with six medals (four won by Ana Bobanović). Croatia has not yet won any medals at Winter Youth Games, best result being Samuel Kolega's 4th place at 2016 Games in alpine skiing, boys' slalom.

The most successful appearance to date was at the 2026 Summer Games in Dakar, Senegal, with seven medals won.

== Medal tables ==
=== Medals by Summer Games ===
Games	Athletes	Gold	Silver	Bronze	Total	Rank
2010 Singapore	25	1	1	1	3	42nd
(China) 2014 Nanjing	24	3	1	1	5	22nd
(Argentina) 2018 Buenos Aires	36	0	1	2	3	71th
(Senegal) 2026 Dakar	19	3	4	0	7	10th
Total		6	6	4	16	40th

=== Medals by Winter Games ===
Games	Athletes	Gold	Silver	Bronze	Total	Rank
(Austria) 2012 Innsbruck	9	0	0	0	0	-
(Norway) 2016 Lillehammer	7	0	0	0	0	-
(Switzerland) 2020 Lausanne	10	0	0	0	0	-
(South Korea) 2024 Gangwon	9	0	0	0	0	-
Total		0	0	0	0	-

=== Medals by summer sport ===
Sport	Gold	Silver	Bronze	Total
Swimming	4	2	0	6
Taekwondo	2	0	1	3
Judo	1	1	2	4
Boxing	0	1	1	2
Athletics	0	1	0	1
Basketball	0	1	0	1
Beach handball	0	1	0	1
Totals (7 entries)	7	7	4	18

== List of medalists ==
=== Summer Games ===
Medal	Name	Games	Sport	Event	Date
Gold	Ivan Capan	2010 Singapore	Swimming	Boys' 50m Breaststroke	19 August
Silver	Matej Buovac; Tomislav Grubišić; Stipe Krstanović; Marko Ramljak	2010 Singapore	Basketball	Boys' Tournament	23 August
Bronze	Barbara Matić	2010 Singapore	Judo	Girls' 63kg	22 August
Gold	Brigita Matić	(China) 2014 Nanjing	Judo	Girls' -78 kg	19 August
Gold	Ivana Babić	(China) 2014 Nanjing	Taekwondo	Girls' −55 kg	19 August
Gold	Nikola Obrovac	(China) 2014 Nanjing	Swimming	Boys' 50 m breaststroke	22 August
Silver	Toni Filipi	(China) 2014 Nanjing	Boxing	Boys' Heavyweight	27 August
Bronze	Luka Plantić	(China) 2014 Nanjing	Boxing	Boys' Middleweight	27 August
Silver	Rea Banić; Mia Bošnjak; Petra Lovrenčević; Anja Vida Lukšić; Ana Malec; Vanja Perenčević; Saša Sladić; Mia Tupek; Nika Vojnović	(Argentina) 2018 Buenos Aires	Beach handball	Girls' tournament	13 October
Bronze	Ana Viktorija Puljiz	(Argentina) 2018 Buenos Aires	Judo	Girls' 44 kg	7 October
Bronze	Lena Stojković	(Argentina) 2018 Buenos Aires	Taekwondo	Girls' 44 kg	7 October
Gold	Ana Bobanović	(Senegal) 2026 Dakar	Swimming	Girls' 100m freestyle	2 November
Gold	Ana Bobanović	(Senegal) 2026 Dakar	Swimming	Girls' 50m freestyle	4 November
Gold	Petra Uglešić	(Senegal) 2026 Dakar	Taekwondo	Girls' 44 kg	8 November
Silver	Jona Žvorc	(Senegal) 2026 Dakar	Judo	Boys' 55kg	1 November
Silver	Ana Bobanović	(Senegal) 2026 Dakar	Swimming	Girls' 50m butterfly	4 November
Silver	Ana Bobanović	(Senegal) 2026 Dakar	Swimming	Girls' 200m freestyle	6 November
Silver	Zara Veltruski	(Senegal) 2026 Dakar	Athletics	Girls' shot put	10 November

=== Summer Games medalists as part of Mixed-NOCs Team ===
Note: Medals awarded in mixed NOC's are not counted for the respective country in the overall medal table.

Medal	Name	Games	Sport	Event	Date
Bronze	Barbara Matić	2010 Singapore	Judo	Mixed Team	25 Aug
Bronze	Brigita Matić	(China) 2014 Nanjing	Judo	Mixed Team	21 August
Gold	Ana Viktorija Puljiz	(Argentina) 2018 Buenos Aires	Judo	Mixed Team	10 October

=== Winter Games medalists as part of Mixed-NOCs Team ===
Medal	Name	Games	Sport	Event
Bronze	Luka Banek	(Switzerland) 2020 Lausanne	Ice hockey	Boys' 3x3 mixed tournament

== Flag bearers ==
#	Games	Season	Flag bearer	Sport
8	2026 Dakar	Summer	Ana Bobanović, Jona Žvorc; Nola Lucarić, Noa Anić	Swimming, Judo; Beach handball, Sailing
7	2024 Gangwon	Winter		
6	2020 Lausanne	Winter	Nika Jagečić; Toni Nimac	Biathlon/Cross-country skiing Bobsleigh
5	2018 Buenos Aires	Summer		
4	2016 Lillehammer	Winter	-	-
3	2014 Nanjing	Summer	Matea Jelić	Taekwondo
2	2012 Innsbruck	Winter	Istok Rodeš	Alpine skiing
1	2010 Singapore	Summer	Ivan Horvat	Athletics

== See also ==
- Croatia at the Olympics
- Croatia at the Paralympics
