= Taekwondo at the 2026 Summer Youth Olympics – Women's 44 kg =

Women's 44 kg at the IV Summer Youth Olympic Games
- Venue: Complexe Iba Mar Diop
- Date: 8 November
- Competitors: 10 from 10 nations

Medalists
1st place, gold medalist(s)		Petra Uglešić	Croatia
2nd place, silver medalist(s)		Elina Tkhamokova	Russia
3rd place, bronze medalist(s)		Virginia Lampis	Italy
3rd place, bronze medalist(s)		Lai Yi-jhen	Chinese Taipei

The women's' 44 kg competition at the 2026 Summer Youth Olympics was held on 8 November at the Complexe Iba Mar Diop.

== Schedule ==
All times are local (UTC+0).

Date	Time	Round
Sunday, 8 November 2026	11:00; 11:48; 16:00; 17:00	Round of 16; Quarterfinals; Semifinals; Final

== Bracket ==
Round of 16
Emilia Biyogo Bikie (GEQ)	DSQ
Petra Uglešić (CRO)
Zahra Isayeva (AZE)	16	18
Shega Sejdiu (KOS)	0	2

Quarterfinals
Natalia Pérez (PAN)	8	4
Petra Uglešić (CRO)	23	20
Virginia Lampis (ITA)	22	20
Mariam Diallo (MLI)	6	5
Lai Yi-jhen (TPE)	10	17
Zhao Yueyannan (CHN)	2	5
Zahra Isayeva (AZE)	0	0
Elina Tkhamokova (RUS)	8	14

Semifinals
Petra Uglešić (CRO)	10	16
Virginia Lampis (ITA)	8	9
Lai Yi-jhen (TPE)	7	8
Elina Tkhamokova (RUS)	13	14

Final
Petra Uglešić (CRO)	21	19
Elina Tkhamokova (RUS)	6	3
