= Swimming at the 2026 Summer Youth Olympics – Men's 100 metre freestyle =

Men's 100 metre freestyle at the 2026 Summer Youth Olympics
- Venue: Complexe Tour de l'Oeuf
- Dates: 2 November
- Competitors: 73 from 72 nations
- Winning time: 49.66

Medalists
gold medal	Bogdan Toropkin	Russia
silver medal	Xie Yichen	China
bronze medal	Lee Han	Chinese Taipei

The men's 100 metre freestyle event at the 2026 Summer Youth Olympics took place on 2 November at the Complexe Tour de l'Oeuf in Dakar, Senegal.

== Results ==
=== Heats ===
The heats were started at 10:27.

Rank	Heat	Lane	Name	Nationality	Time	Notes
1	9	4	Lee Han	Chinese Taipei	50.42	Q
2	10	3	Bogdan Toropkin	Russia	50.61	Q
3	9	5	Zdeněk Procházka	Czech Republic	50.81	Q
4	8	4	Daniel Saborío	Mexico	51.18	Q
5	9	3	Salaheddine Torki	Algeria	51.20	Q
6	10	4	Xie Yichen	China	51.36	Q
7	8	5	Lee Ji-hoo	South Korea	51.46	Q
8	8	6	Adanuriel Rosal	Venezuela	51.53	Q
9	10	2	Loo Cheng Feng	Malaysia	51.65	
10	10	5	Matiáš Krištof	Slovakia	51.86	
11	9	6	Andrew Laghoutis	Cyprus	51.90	
12	10	7	Tarek Bluck	Sri Lanka	52.36	
13	8	3	Aleksej Kalanj	Serbia	52.66	
14	9	7	Nathan Bock	Namibia	52.70	
15	8	1	Christon Joseph	Bahamas	52.81	
16	8	7	Matthew Kennedy	Jamaica	53.10	
17	8	2	Lev Fahy	Cayman Islands	53.11	
18	6	7	Humoud Al-Humoud	Kuwait	53.19	
19	5	2	Aviv Pradhan	Nepal	53.20	
20	9	1	Matthew Goller	South Africa	53.22	
21	7	3	Sean-Verno Dipokromo	Suriname	53.26	
22	7	1	Niccolò Pilenga	El Salvador	53.27	
23	8	8	Mauricio Espejo	Dominican Republic	53.44	
24	10	1	Joshua Mulenga	Zambia	53.50	
25	7	8	Thiago Pizzini	Argentina	53.56	
26	10	6	Giovanni Krismer	Austria	53.60	
27	3	1	Filippo Aloisi	Italy	53.65	
28	9	2	Kırhan Yılmaz	Turkey	53.78	
29	7	4	Kashope Obatoyinbo	Nigeria	53.81	
30	6	6	Andrés Rojas	Costa Rica	54.17	
31	6	4	Ocean Campus	Guam	54.49	
32	5	1	Ali Ali	Bahrain	54.61	
32	7	6	Thaddeus Kwong	Fiji	54.61	
34	4	1	Ian Alonso	Puerto Rico	54.64	
35	5	4	Michael El Werr	Jordan	54.88	
36	6	3	Dachi Meskhishvili	Georgia	55.03	
37	5	3	Mohammed Zayed	Palestine	55.05	
38	6	8	Hazen Dabriel	Saint Vincent and the Grenadines	55.14	
39	6	1	Kobe Tuioti	Samoa	55.18	
40	6	5	Santiago Guimarães	Angola	55.22	
41	7	2	Matteo Biagini	Senegal	55.35	
42	5	8	Federico Castell	Uruguay	55.39	
43	4	7	Mark Mwase	Uganda	55.47	
44	7	5	Jacob Collymore	Grenada	55.51	
45	5	7	Alexander Villiami	Tonga	55.78	
46	10	8	Tamba Boamah	Ghana	55.93	
47	4	2	Peterson Inhensiko	Uganda	56.25	
48	3	4	Mohamed Yassine Ben Ajmia	Tunisia	56.30	
49	7	7	Ēriks Magrins	Latvia	56.37	
50	4	5	Abdulla Al-Amer	United Arab Emirates	56.40	
51	4	3	Yousef Elwalid	Libya	56.48	
52	5	6	Noah Dorville	Saint Lucia	56.62	
53	5	5	Seif Elshekh	Dominica	56.98	
54	4	4	Lazaro Menete	Mozambique	57.00	
55	3	6	Daniel Nasredinov	Kyrgyzstan	57.04	
56	9	8	Anatoliy Rudenko	Kazakhstan	57.93	
57	4	6	Younes Ali El Wafa	Comoros	58.18	
58	3	2	Tasunje Mkavea	Malawi	58.23	
59	4	8	Myles Gonçalves	Cape Verde	58.47	
60	3	8	Sheja Murenzi	Rwanda	58.57	
61	3	5	Nasri Jean-Baptiste	Seychelles	58.67	
62	3	3	Zack Okumu	Tanzania	58.86	
63	6	2	Zion John-Baptiste	Virgin Islands	59.08	
64	3	7	Shalom Tevoedjre	Benin	59.89	
65	2	4	Jirasak Khammavongkeo	Laos	1:00.41	
66	2	3	Jéhu Matondo	Democratic Republic of the Congo	1:00.76	
67	2	5	Betselote Gebreyohannes	Ethiopia	1:02.45	
68	2	7	Younoussa Maiga	Mali	1:04.86	
69	2	6	Remy Idieder	Vanuatu	1:04.89	
70	1	5	Jerry Yossa	Cameroon	1:05.97	
71	1	4	Erik Gonsalves	Guyana	1:06.05	
72	2	2	Jacob Hutchinson	Marshall Islands	1:08.53	
73	1	3	Peter Bewie	Sierra Leone	1:23.04	

=== Final ===
The final was held at 15:03.

Rank	Lane	Name	Nationality	Time	Notes
1st place, gold medalist(s)	5	Bogdan Toropkin	Russia	49.66	
2nd place, silver medalist(s)	7	Xie Yichen	China	50.18	
3rd place, bronze medalist(s)	4	Lee Han	Chinese Taipei	50.26	
4	3	Zdeněk Procházka	Czech Republic	50.54	
5	6	Daniel Saborío	Mexico	50.75	
6	8	Adanuriel Rosal	Venezuela	50.96	
7	1	Lee Ji-hoo	South Korea	51.11	
8	2	Salaheddine Torki	Algeria	51.45	
