= Athletics at the 2026 Summer Youth Olympics – Women's 2000 metres steeplechase =

Athletics event at the 2026 Summer Youth Olympics

Women's 2000 metres steeplechase at the IV Summer Youth Olympic Games
- Venue: Complexe Iba Mar Diop
- Date: 8 November
- Competitors: 11 from 11 nations
- Winning time: 6:30.24

Medalists
1st place, gold medalist(s)		Abigael Kosgei	Kenya
2nd place, silver medalist(s)		Mekonen Abera	Ethiopia
3rd place, bronze medalist(s)		Elif Celik	Turkey

The women's 2000 metres steeplechase event at the 2026 Summer Youth Olympics was held on 8 November at the Complexe Iba Mar Diop in Dakar, Senegal. Kenya's Abigael Kosgei won in a time of 6:30.24.

== Schedule ==
All times are local (West Africa Time, UTC+0).

Date	Time	Round
8 November 2026	15:20	Final
8 November 2026	17:13	Victory ceremony

== Results ==
=== Final ===
The final was held on 8 November at 15:20.

Rank	Athlete	Nation	Time	Remark
1	Abigael Kosgei	Kenya	6:30.24	PB
2	Mekonen Abera	Ethiopia	6:32.15	PB
3	Elif Celik	Turkey	6:36.99	PB
4	Nasimakhon Mamirova	Uzbekistan	6:41.23	PB
5	Racheal Chelimo	Uganda	6:49.56	PB
6	Nina Okuliarova	Slovakia	6:58.22	
7	Antonella Bonomi	Uruguay	7:06.42	
8	Krissia Martínez	El Salvador	7:27.09	
9	Lana Plut	Slovenia	7:55.83	
10	Gandzhina Rakhmonova	Tajikistan	8:26.99	PB
—	Nesrine Yousfi	Tunisia	DNS	
