= Refugee Olympic Team at the 2026 Summer Youth Olympics =

- Individuals compete under the Olympic Flag
- IOC code: EOR

in Dakar, Senegal 31 October 2026 – 13 November 2026
- Competitors: 6 in 3 sports
- Flag bearer (closing): Nyataba Gatloth Kuek
- Medals: Gold 0 Silver 0 Bronze 0 Total 0

Summer Youth Olympics appearances
- 2026

The IOC Refugee Olympic Team (French: Équipe olympique des réfugiés, ÉOR) competed at the 2026 Summer Youth Olympics in Dakar, Senegal from October 31 to November 13, 2026. This marked the first time a Refugee Olympic Team participated in the Youth Olympics.

Yiech Biel, a South Sudanese who grew up at the Kakuma Refugee Camp in Kenya is the chef de mission of the Refugee Olympic Team.

== Competitors ==
The following is the list of number of competitors participating at the Games per sport/discipline.

Sport	Men	Women	Total
Athletics	2	2	4
Judo	1	0	1
Taekwondo	0	1	1
Total	3	3	6

== Team selection ==
Six refugees residing in Kenya and Uganda were selected to form the Refugee Olympic Team for the 2026 Summer Youth Olympics.

Athlete	Country of origin	Host NOC	Sport	Event
Arno Yafunga	DR Congo	Kenya	Judo	Men's -55 kg
Rachid Rochene	DR Congo	Uganda	Athletics	Men's 200 m
Clement Niyomuhoza	Burundi	Kenya	Athletics	Men's 800 m
Florence Masumbe	DR Congo	Uganda	Athletics	Women's 200 m
Nyataba Gatloth Kuek	South Sudan	Kenya	Athletics	Women's 800 m
Lourance Namukiza	DR Congo	Kenya	Taekwondo	Women's -49 kg

== Athletics ==
The Refugee Olympic Team had four track and field athletes. This includes Rachid Rochene and Florence Masumbe who are from the Democratic Republic of the Congo who fled to Uganda, Clement Niyomuhoza of Burundi, and Nyataba Gatloth Kuek of South Sudan. Niyomuhoza and Kuek are based in Kenya.

=== Track & road events ===
Men

Athlete	Event	Semifinal		Final	
Athlete	Event	Result	Rank	Result	Rank
Rachid Rochene	200 m	24.32	13	Did not advance	
Clement Niyomuhoza	800 m	2:25.00	14	Did not advance	

Women

Athlete	Event	Semifinal		Final	
Athlete	Event	Result	Rank	Result	Rank
Florence Masumbe	200 m	29.54	15	Did not advance	
Nyataba Gatloth Kuek	800 m	No record (Note: Kuek was part of the Entry List by NOC for the women's 800 metres. However, Kuek was not included among the participating athletes in the semifinals, the first phase of the event.)			

== Judo ==
Arno Botay Yafunga Ntandu is the sole judoka in the Refugee Olympic Team. Raised in the Kakuma Refugee Camp, Yafunga's family came from the DR Congo. His father Arnold Yafunga is a judo coach.

Arno Yafunga reached the bronze medal game, losing to Tögskhüslen Tungalag of Mongolia in the final of the men's -55 kg division.

Athlete	Event	Round of 16	Quarterfinals	Semifinals	Repechage		Final / BM	
Athlete	Event	Opposition Result	Opposition Result	Opposition Result	Opposition Result	Opposition Result	Opposition Result	Rank
Arno Yafunga	Men's -55 kg	Juma (TAN); W 010–000	Hebah (KSA); L 000–100	Did not advance	Tareen (AFG); W w/o	Moussa (CAF); W 102–000	Tungalag (MGL); L 000–100	—N/a

== Taekwondo ==
Lourance Namukiza is the sole entrant for taekwondo for the Refugee Olympic Team. With roots to the DR Congo, Namukiza grew up at the Kakuma Refugee Camp in Kenya. She received a bye to the women’s -49kg quarterfinals where she lost her only match to Ioanna Konstantinou of Cyprus.

Athlete	Event	Round of 16	Quarterfinals	Semifinals	Final	
Opposition Result	Opposition Result	Opposition Result	Opposition Result	Opposition Result	Opposition Result	Rank
Lourance Namukiza	Women's -49 kg	Bye	Konstantinou (CYP); L 0–17, 0–16	Did not advance		
