= Athletics at the 2026 Summer Youth Olympics – Women's 800 metres =

Athletics event at the 2026 Summer Youth Olympics

Women's 800 metres at the IV Summer Youth Olympic Games
- Venue: Complexe Iba Mar Diop
- Date: 8–9 November
- Competitors: 13 from 13 nations

Medalists
1st place, gold medalist(s)		Netsanet Selemon	Ethiopia
2nd place, silver medalist(s)		Naomi Cesar	Philippines
3rd place, bronze medalist(s)		Khadija Elmostaqim	Morocco

The women's 800 metres competition at the 2026 Summer Youth Olympics was held on 8 and 9 November at the Complexe Iba Mar Diop in Dakar, Senegal.

== Schedule ==
All times are in local time (UTC).

Date	Time	Round
Sunday, 8 November 2026	14:25	Semi-finals
Monday, 9 November 2026	17:10	Final

== Results ==
=== Semi-finals ===
The semi-finals consisted of two heats. The first four athletes in each heat (Q) qualified automatically for the final. One additional athlete with the fastest time among the remaining competitors (q) also advanced to the final. A total of nine athletes qualified for the final.

The abbreviation Q denotes qualification by finishing position, while q denotes qualification by time. Athletes who did not meet either qualification criterion were eliminated.

Rank	Semi-final	Bib	Lane	Athlete	Nation	Result	Notes
1	SF2	165	5	Netsanet Selemon	Ethiopia	2:08.28	Q
2	SF2	213	6	Khadija Elmostaqim	Morocco	2:14.10	Q
3	SF2	125	7	Valentina Cancino	Chile	2:16.01	Q
4	SF1	270	4	Yvette Kpatcha	Togo	2:19.34	Q, PB
5	SF1	257	6	Masa Weber	Slovenia	2:19.89	Q
6	SF1	233	5	Naomi Cesar	Philippines	2:20.16	Q
7	SF2	115	4	Mpho Maano	Botswana	2:21.34	Q, PB
8	SF2	220	2	Awa Diarra	Mali	2:23.35	q, PB
9	SF1	154	8	Ashly Benítez	El Salvador	2:23.51	Q, PB
10	SF2	122	8	Divine Deborah Alexia Banzato	Central African Republic	2:24.57	PB
11	SF1	182	3	Gendis Syafitri	Indonesia	2:29.99	PB
12	SF2	254	3	Mabinty Kamara	Sierra Leone	2:56.23	PB
	SF1	203	7	Erise Avdullahu	Kosovo	DNF	

=== Final ===
The final was held on 9 November 2026 at 17:10 local time. Netsanet Selemon of Ethiopia won the gold medal in a personal best of 2:04.43.

Rank	Lane	Bib	Athlete	Nation	Result	Remark
1st place, gold medalist(s)	6	165	Netsanet Selemon	Ethiopia	2:04.43	PB
2nd place, silver medalist(s)	5	233	Naomi Cesar	Philippines	2:09.34	
3rd place, bronze medalist(s)	4	213	Khadija Elmostaqim	Morocco	2:10.05	
4	7	257	Masa Weber	Slovenia	2:10.58	
5	3	270	Yvette Kpatcha	Togo	2:15.80	PB
6	8	125	Valentina Cancino	Chile	2:18.59	
7	2	154	Ashly Benítez	El Salvador	2:21.07	PB
8	1	115	Mpho Maano	Botswana	2:26.58	
9	9	220	Awa Diarra	Mali	2:31.29	
