= Athletics at the 2026 Summer Youth Olympics – Men's javelin throw =

Men's javelin throw athletics event at the 2026 Summer Youth Olympics

Men's javelin throw at the IV Summer Youth Olympic Games
- Venue: Complexe Iba Mar Diop
- Date: 10 November
- Competitors: 8 from 8 nations
- Winning time: 73.49 m

Medalists
1st place, gold medalist(s)		Marko Kaethler	Paraguay
2nd place, silver medalist(s)		Dilan Andres Graciano	Colombia
3rd place, bronze medalist(s)		Vladimir Culis	Moldova

The men's javelin throw event at the 2026 Summer Youth Olympics was held on 10 November 2026 at the Complexe Iba Mar Diop in Dakar, Senegal.

According to the competition format, field events consisted of a single competition phase (final).

== Schedule ==
All times are in local time (UTC+0).

Date	Time	Round
10 November 2026	14:08	Final

== Results ==
=== Final ===
The final was held on 10 November 2026, from 14:08 to 15:02.

Rank	Bib	Athlete	Nation	1	2	3	4	5	6	Result	Remark
1st place, gold medalist(s)	435	Marko Kaethler	Paraguay	68.55	72.20	66.48	71.12	70.00	73.49	73.49	PB
2nd place, silver medalist(s)	337	Dilan Andres Graciano	Colombia	70.60	68.35	71.72	71.45	69.25	68.20	71.72	PB
3rd place, bronze medalist(s)	414	Vladimir Culis	Moldova	65.50	59.21	67.43	x	60.70	64.62	67.43	PB
4	455	Jacobus van der Merwe	South Africa	58.65	64.29	63.37	63.40	61.20	58.92	64.29	
5	472	Bunyodbek Khudoiqulov	Tajikistan	51.00	59.65	57.41	59.98	62.77	60.36	62.77	PB
6	483	Lotesi Mesu	Tuvalu	41.67	38.43	47.45	41.28	45.94	x	47.45	PB
7	447	JJ Gonzalez Milord	Puerto Rico	x	44.46	42.30	x	41.21	35.35	44.46	PB
	430	Godswill Nkemakolam	Nigeria	DNS							
