= Bhutan at the 2026 Summer Youth Olympics =

- Flag of Bhutan
- IOC code: BHU
- NOC: Bhutan Olympic Committee
- Website: www.bhutanolympiccommittee.org

in Dakar, Senegal October 31, 2026 – November 13, 2026
- Competitors: 3 in 3 sports
- Flag bearer: Sangay Thinley
- Medals: Gold 0 Silver 0 Bronze 0 Total 0

Summer Youth Olympics appearances
- 2010; 2014; 2018; 2026

Bhutan is scheduled to compete at the 2026 Summer Youth Olympics in Dakar, Senegal from October 31 to November 13, 2026. This will mark Bhutan's fourth appearance at the Youth Olympics, after making its debut in 2010.

Judoka Sangay Thinley served as the flag bearer for the opening ceremony.

== Competitors ==
The following is the list of number of competitors participating at the Games per sport/discipline.

Sport	Men	Women	Total
Athletics	1	0	1
Boxing	0	1	1
Judo	1	0	1
Total	2	1	3

== Athletics ==
Bhutan entered one male athlete.

=== Track & road events ===
Men

Athlete	Event	Heat		Semifinal		Final	
Athlete	Event	Result	Rank	Result	Rank	Result	Rank
Pema Yoezer	3000 m						

== Boxing ==
Bhutan entered one female athlete in the −51 kg category.

Women

Athlete	Weight	Round of 16	Quarterfinals	Semifinals	Final / BM	
Athlete	Weight	Opposition Result	Opposition Result	Opposition Result	Opposition Result	Rank
Sangay Peldon	–51 kg					

== Judo ==
Bhutan entered one male judoka based on the available quotas assigned by the International Judo Federation.

Men

Athlete	Event	Round of 16	Quarterfinals	Semifinals	Repechage 1	Repechage 2	Final / BM	
Athlete	Event	Opposition Result	Opposition Result	Opposition Result	Opposition Result	Opposition Result	Rank	
Sangay Thinley	–55 kg	Elisha Zimba (ZAM) L 000–020	Did not advance		Moussa Kota (MLI) W 100–0	Elisha Zimba (ZAM) L 000–100	Did not advance	7
