= Judo at the 2026 Summer Youth Olympics – Men's 55 kg =

Judo Men's 55 kg at the 2026 Summer Youth Olympics
- Venue: Complexe Iba Mar Diop
- Location: Dakar, Senegal
- Date: 1 November
- Competitors: 11 from 11 nations

Medalists
gold medal	Ibrahim Talibov	Azerbaijan
silver medal	Jona Žvorc	Croatia
bronze medal	Tugskhuslen Tungalag	Mongolia
bronze medal	Elisha Zimba	Zambia

Competition at external databases
- Links: IJF • JudoInside

The men's 55 kg competition in judo at the 2026 Summer Youth Olympics was held on 1 November 2026 at the Dakar Expo Centre in Dakar. Eleven judoka competed in the event.

== Results ==
=== Main bracket ===
Round of 16
Ibrahim Moussa (CAF)	w/o
~~Jahan Zeeb Tareen (AFG)~~
Botay Arno Yafunga (EOR)	010
Ashraf Juma (TAN)	000
Sangay Thinley (BHU)	000
Elisha Zimba (ZAM)	020

Quarter-finals
Ibrahim Talibov (AZE)	101
Ibrahim Moussa (CAF)	000
Mutaz Hebah (KSA)	100
Botay Arno Yafunga (EOR)	000
Jona Žvorc (CRO)	110
Moussa Koita (MLI)	000
Tugskhuslen Tungalag (MGL)	001 (yellow card)
Elisha Zimba (ZAM)	000

Semi-finals
Ibrahim Talibov (AZE)	100
Mutaz Hebah (KSA)	000
Jona Žvorc (CRO)	100
Tugskhuslen Tungalag (MGL)	000

Final
Ibrahim Talibov (AZE)	010
Jona Žvorc (CRO)	001

=== Repechage ===
Repechage 1
Ashraf Juma (TAN)	000
Ibrahim Moussa (CAF)	100
~~Jahan Zeeb Tareen (AFG)~~
Botay Arno Yafunga (EOR)	w/o
Sangay Thinley (BHU)	100
Moussa Koita (MLI)	000

Repechage 2
Ibrahim Moussa (CAF)	000
Botay Arno Yafunga (EOR)	102
Sangay Thinley (BHU)	000 (yellow card)
Elisha Zimba (ZAM)	100 (yellow card)

Bronze medal
Botay Arno Yafunga (EOR)	000
Tugskhuslen Tungalag (MGL)	100
Elisha Zimba (ZAM)	100
Mutaz Hebah (KSA)	000

== Medal summary ==
Medal	Athlete	NOC
Gold	Ibrahim Talibov	Azerbaijan
Silver	Jona Žvorc	Croatia
Bronze	Tugskhuslen Tungalag	Mongolia
Bronze	Elisha Zimba	Zambia
