= Mongolia at the 2026 Summer Youth Olympics =

- Flag of Mongolia
- IOC code: MGL
- NOC: Mongolian National Olympic Committee
- Website: www.olympic.mn

in Dakar, Senegal October 31, 2026 – November 13, 2026
- Competitors: 10 in 6 sports
- Flag bearers: Orgilmaa Badrakh & Tungskhuslen Tungalag
- Medals Ranked 85th: Gold 0 Silver 0 Bronze 2 Total 2

Summer Youth Olympics appearances
- 2010; 2014; 2018; 2026

Mongolia competed at the 2026 Summer Youth Olympics in Dakar, Senegal from October 31 to November 13, 2026. This will mark Mongolia's fourth appearance at the Youth Olympics, after making its debut in 2010.

Swimmer Orgilmaa Badrakh and judoka Tungskhuslen Tungalag served as the flag bearers for the opening ceremony.

They finished their campaign with two bronze medals.

== Competitors ==
The following is the list of number of competitors participating at the Games per sport/discipline.

Sport	Men	Women	Total
3x3 basketball	4	0	4
Beach wrestling	0	1	1
Boxing	0	1	1
Judo	1	0	1
Road cycling	0	1	1
Swimming	1	1	2
Total	6	4	10

== Medalists ==
Medals won
Medal	Athlete	Sport	Event	Date
Bronze	Tugskhuslen Tungalag	Judo	Boys' 55kg	1 November
Bronze	Anujin Erkhembaatar	Beach wrestling	Women's 65kg	1 November

== 3x3 basketball ==
Mongolia entered a team for the men's tournament as one of the three participating teams from the Asia-Pacifics.

Summary

Event	Pool play			Quarterfinal	Semifinal	Final / BM	
Event	Opposition Score	Opposition Score	Group Rank	Opposition Score	Opposition Score	Opposition Score	Rank
Men's tournament	Venezuela W 21–19	Argentina L 10–21	2 Q	Senegal L 11–20	Did not advance		8

Roster

- Sukhbat Damdin
- Bilegt Khangarid
- Munkherdene Munkhnairamdal
- Delgermurun Naranbaatar

== Beach wrestling ==
Mongolia entered one female athlete.

Women

Athlete	Weight	Pool play				Semifinals	Final / BM	
Athlete	Weight	Opposition Result	Opposition Result	Opposition Result	Group Rank	Opposition Result	Opposition Result	Rank
Anujin Erkhembaatar	–65 kg	Rados Emanuela (CRO) W 3–0	Manga Mery (SEN) W 3–0	Apostol Aleia (USA) W 4–0	1 Q	Yolani Rosaldo (DOM) L 1–2	Malak Abdelgalil (EGY) W 4–1	3rd place, bronze medalist(s)

== Boxing ==
Mongolia entered one female athlete in the −48 kg category.

Women

Athlete	Weight	Round of 16	Quarterfinals	Semifinals	Final / BM	
Athlete	Weight	Opposition Result	Opposition Result	Opposition Result	Opposition Result	Rank
Altanzul Altangadas	–48 kg	Bye	Bassett Lily (GBR) L RSC	Did not advance		=5

== Judo ==
Mongolia entered one male judoka based on the available quotas assigned by the International Judo Federation.

Men

Athlete	Event	Round of 16	Quarterfinals	Semifinals	Repechage	Final / BM	
Athlete	Event	Opposition Result	Opposition Result	Opposition Result	Opposition Result	Opposition Result	Rank
Tungalagiin Tögskhüslen	–55 kg	Bye	Elisha Zimba (ZAM) W 1–0	Jona Žvorc (CRO) L 0–100	Bye	Botay Arno Yafunga (EOR) W 100–0	3rd place, bronze medalist(s)

== Road cycling ==
Mongolia entered one female athlete.

Women

Athlete	Event	Time	Rank
Ariunkhuslen Gansukh	Road race	Did not finish	
Ariunkhuslen Gansukh	Time trial	14:33.40	36

== Swimming ==
Mongolia entered two swimmers, one male and one female.

Athlete	Event	Heat		Final	
Athlete	Event	Time	Rank	Time	Rank
Enkhmend Enkhmend	50 m breaststroke	29.78	9	Did not advance	
Enkhmend Enkhmend	100 m breaststroke	1:04.24	9	Did not advance	
Enkhmend Enkhmend	200 m breaststroke	2:24.34	7 Q	2:21.65	7
Enkhmend Enkhmend	200 m individual medley	Did not participate			
Orgilmaa Badrakh	50 m freestyle	29.02	40	Did not advance	
Orgilmaa Badrakh	100 m freestyle	1:03.77	47	Did not advance	
Orgilmaa Badrakh	200 m freestyle	2:20.46	27	Did not advance	
Orgilmaa Badrakh	400 m freestyle	—		4:51.13	16
