= Dominican Republic at the 2026 Summer Youth Olympics =

- Flag of Dominican Republic
- IOC code: DOM
- NOC: Dominican Republic Olympic Committee
- Website: www.colimdo.org

in Dakar, Senegal October 31, 2026 – November 13, 2026
- Competitors: 11 in 8 sports
- Flag bearers: Carla Tolentino & Mauricio Espejo Peña
- Medals Ranked 33rd: Gold 2 Silver 0 Bronze 0 Total 2

Summer Youth Olympics appearances
- 2010; 2014; 2018; 2026

The Dominican Republic is competing at the 2026 Summer Youth Olympics in Dakar, Senegal from October 31 to November 13, 2026. This will mark Dominican Republic's fourth appearance at the Youth Olympics, after making its debut in 2010.

Judoka Carla Tolentino and swimmer Mauricio Espejo Peña served as the flag bearers for the opening ceremony.

== Competitors ==
The following is the list of number of competitors participating at the Games per sport/discipline.

Sport	Men	Women	Total
Athletics	1	1	2
Beach volleyball	0	2	2
Beach wrestling	0	1	1
Boxing	1	0	1
Fencing	1	0	1
Judo	0	1	1
Sailing	1	0	1
Swimming	1	1	1
Total	5	6	11

== Medalists ==
Medal	Name	Sport	Event	Date
Gold	Yolayni Rosado	Beach wrestling	Women's -65 kg	8 November
Gold	Patricia Sine	Athletics	Women's 200 m	10 November

== Athletics ==
Dominican Republic entered two athletes, one male and one female.

=== Track & road events ===
Men

Athlete	Event	Semifinal		Final	
Athlete	Event	Result	Rank	Result	Rank
Melvin Torres	400 m hurdles	54.34	12	Did not advance	

Women

Athlete	Event	Semifinal		Final	
Athlete	Event	Result	Rank	Result	Rank
Patricia Sine	200 m	23.64	Q	23,35	1st place, gold medalist(s)

== Beach volleyball ==
Dominican Republic received a quota place for the women's tournament.

Summary

Team	Event	Group stage				Round of 16	Quarterfinals	Semifinals	Final / PG / BM	
Team	Event	Opposition Result	Opposition Result	Opposition Result	Rank	Opposition Result	Opposition Result	Opposition Result	Opposition Result	Rank
Zoe Paniagua; Yerelin Reyes	Women's tournament	Ong / Goh (MAS); W 21–18, 20-22, 18-16	Segnane / Tine (SEN); L 17–21, 19-21	dos Reis / Mendes (CPV); W 21–16, 21-10	2 Q	Frascaroli / García (ARG); L 16–21, 12-21	Did not advance			9

== Beach wrestling ==
Domincan Republic entered one female athlete.

Women

Team	Event	Group stage				Semifinals	Final / BM	
Team	Event	Opposition Result	Opposition Result	Opposition Result	Rank	Opposition Result	Opposition Result	Rank
Yolayni Rosado	-65 kg	Antra (IND); W 2–1	Wanjala (KEN); W 4–2	Eningo (ESP); W 3–2	1 Q	Erkhembaatar (MGL); W 3–1	Eningo (ESP); W 3–1	1st place, gold medalist(s)

== Boxing ==
Dominican Republic entered one male athlete in the -60 kg category.

Men

Athlete	Weight	Round of 16	Quarterfinals	Semifinals	Final / BMISMAILOV Emil	
Athlete	Weight	Opposition Result	Opposition Result	Opposition Result	Opposition Result	Rank
Michael Reyes	-55 kg	Ismailov (GEO); L 1–4	Did not advance			=9

== Fencing ==
Dominican Republic entered one male athlete.

Athlete	Event	Group Stage						Round of 16	Quarterfinal	Semifinal	Final / BM	
Athlete	Event	Opposition Score	Opposition Score	Opposition Score	Opposition Score	Opposition Score	Rank	Opposition Score	Opposition Score	Opposition Score	Opposition Score	Rank
Aiden Zahran	Men's epée	Diop (SEN); L 4–5	Radjenovic (SRB); L 3–5	Caldito (PAN); L 2–5	Lachman (ISR); L 2–5	Shan (CAN); L 0–5	12 Q	Heer (SUI); L 2–15	Did not advance			12

== Judo ==
Dominican Republic entered one female judoka based on the available quotas assigned by the International Judo Federation.

Women

Athlete	Event	Round of 16	Quarterfinals	Semifinals	Repechage 1	Repechage 2	Final / BM	
Athlete	Event	Opposition Result	Opposition Result	Opposition Result	Opposition Result	Opposition Result	Opposition Result	Rank
Carla Tolentino	-44 kg	Bye	Sara Coni (ITA) L Walkover	did not advance	Juan Montealegre (BOT) L Walkover	did not advance	did not advance	=9

== Sailing ==
Dominican Republic entered one male athlete.

Athlete	Event	Opening Series – Points per Race														Total Points	Net Points	Final Rank
Athlete	Event	1	2	3	4	5	6	7	8	9	10	11	12	13	MR	Total Points	Net Points	Final Rank
Carlos Ramírez	Men's windsurfing	13	9	15	17	16	14	BFD	BFD	OCS	OCS	11	15	18	20	248	173	18

== Swimming ==
Dominican Republic entered two swimmers, one male and one female.

Athlete	Event	Heat		Semifinal		Final	
Athlete	Event	Time	Rank	Time	Rank	Time	Rank
Mauricio Espejo Peña	100 m freestyle	53.44	23	N/A	N/A	did not advance	did not advance
Antonella Aybar	100 m freestyle	59.81	18	N/A	N/A	did not advance	did not advance
