= Naomi Cesar =

Filipino middle-distance runner (born 2009)

Personal information
- Full name: Naomi Marjorie Cesar
- Born: January 12, 2009 (age 17)

Sport
- Sport: Athletics
- Event: Middle-distance running

Achievements and titles
- Personal bests: 800 m 2:06.75 (Portland, 2025)
Medal record
Women's athletics
Representing the Philippines
SEA Games
Gold medal – first place	2025 Thailand	800 m
Youth Olympic Games
Silver medal – second place	2026 Dakar	800 m
Asian Youth Games
Silver medal – second place	2025 Bahrain	800 m
Asian U18 Championships
Bronze medal – third place	2025 Saudi	800 m

Naomi Marjorie Cesar is a Filipino middle-distance runner, specialising in the 800 meters.

== Early life and education ==
Naomi Marjorie Cesar was born on January 12, 2009. Her father is Ben Cesar, who competed for the Philippines national athletics team from 1991 to 1997. Her mother is an American. She has a sister and a brother who also grew up to be a soccer (football) and track athlete respectively.

As of 2025, Naomi Cesar is a tenth grade student at the Sunset High School in Portland, Oregon in the United States.

== Career ==
Cesar debuted for the Philippines at the 2025 Asian U18 Athletics Championships in Saudi Arabia. She won a bronze medal in the women's 800 meters. It was the first ever medal for the Philippines in the competition in a sprint event.

Cesar later competed at the 2025 Asian Youth Games in Bahrain where she improved her performance by winning a silvler in the women's 800 m. This qualified her a slot for her first SEA Games in the 2025 edition in Thailand. Competing with older runners, she won a gold medal for her country in the same event in the Southeast Asian tournament.

In June 2026, Cesar set a new Philippine national record after she clocked 2:06.75 at the Oregon OSAA Outdoor State Championships to earn a silver medal at the women's 800 m. The following month, Cesar competed at the 2026 World Athletics U20 Championships in Eugene, Oregon. She finished sixth in the women's 800 m heats, failing to advance to the semifinals.

Cesar was nominated by Philippine Athletics Track and Field Association to take part at the 2026 Summer Youth Olympics in Dakar, Senegal. In the international tournament's women's 800 m in November, Cesar ran with the time of 2:09.34 which was enough to earn her a silver medal.

== Personal life ==
Cesar's older sister Malea has played for the Philippines women's national football team.
