= Burundi at the 2026 Summer Youth Olympics =

- Flag of Burundi
- IOC code: BDI
- NOC: Comité National Olympique du Burundi

in Dakar, Senegal October 31, 2026 – November 13, 2026
- Competitors: 4 in 3 sports
- Flag bearers: Lois Eliora Irishura & Don de Dieu Igiraneza
- Medals: Gold 0 Silver 0 Bronze 1 Total 1

Summer Youth Olympics appearances
- 2010; 2014; 2018; 2026

Burundi is scheduled to compete at the 2026 Summer Youth Olympics in Dakar, Senegal from October 31 to November 13, 2026. This will mark Burundi's fourth appearance at the Youth Olympics, after making its debut in 2010.

Swimmer Lois Eliora Irishura and judoka Don de Dieu Igiraneza served as the flag bearers for the opening ceremony.

== Medalists ==
Medal	Name	Sport	Event	Date
Bronze	Don de Dieu Igiraneza	Judo	Men's –100 kg	3 November

== Competitors ==
The following is the list of number of competitors participating at the Games per sport/discipline.

Sport	Men	Women	Total
Athletics	1	0	1
Judo	1	0	1
Swimming	1	1	2
Total	3	1	4

== Athletics ==
Burundi entered one male athlete.

=== Track & road events ===
Men

Athlete	Event	Final	
Athlete	Event	Result	Rank
Justin Nihimbazwe	Men's 1500 m		

== Judo ==
Burundi entered one male judoka based on the available quotas assigned by the International Judo Federation.

Men

Athlete	Event	Round of 16	Quarterfinals	Semifinals	Repechage 1	Repechage 2	Final	
Athlete	Event	Opposition Result	Opposition Result	Opposition Result	Opposition Result	Opposition Result	Opposition Result	Rank
Don de Dieu Igiraneza	Men's –100 kg	Bye	Simić (SRB); W 11–2	Eshpulatov (UZB); L 0–100	—N/a		Sharif (TJK); W 100–1	3rd place, bronze medalist(s)

== Swimming ==
Burundi entered two swimmers, one of each gender.

Athlete	Event	Heat		Final	
Athlete	Event	Time	Rank	Time	Rank
Ariel Knurunziza	Men's 50 m freestyle	29.21	51	Did not advance	
Ariel Knurunziza	Men's 100 m breaststroke	1:25.76	29	Did not advance	
Ariel Knurunziza	Men's 50 m butterfly	32.58	39	Did not advance	
Loïs Irishura	Women's 50 m freestyle	29.51	48	Did not advance	
Loïs Irishura	Women's 100 m freestyle	1:06.35	56	Did not advance	
Loïs Irishura	Women's 50 m backstroke	34.68	40	Did not advance	
