= Swimming at the 2026 Summer Youth Olympics – Women's 50 metre butterfly =

Women's 50 metre butterfly at the 2026 Summer Youth Olympics
- Venue: Complexe Tour de l'Oeuf
- Dates: 4 November
- Competitors: 40 from 40 nations
- Winning time: 27.28

Medalists
| gold medal | Serafima Fokina | Russia |
| silver medal | Ana Bobanović | Croatia |
| bronze medal | Fernanda García | Mexico |

The women's 50 metre butterfly event at the 2026 Summer Youth Olympics took place on 4 November at the Complexe Tour de l'Oeuf in Dakar, Senegal.

== Results ==
=== Heats ===
The heats were started at 10:55.

| Rank | Heat | Lane | Name | Nationality | Time | Notes |
|---|---|---|---|---|---|---|
| 1 | 5 | 4 | Serafima Fokina | Russia | 27.21 | Q |
| 2 | 5 | 6 | Ana Bobanović | Croatia | 27.26 | Q |
| 3 | 5 | 5 | Fernanda García | Mexico | 27.48 | Q |
| 4 | 3 | 4 | Maari Randväli | Estonia | 27.69 | Q |
| 5 | 4 | 5 | Ana Júlia Amaral | Brazil | 27.78 | Q |
| 6 | 3 | 3 | Zofia Kowalska-Frączyk | Poland | 28.00 | Q |
| 7 | 4 | 4 | Cielo Moya | Peru | 28.13 | Q |
| 8 | 3 | 5 | Skyelar Richards | Jamaica | 28.17 | QSO |
| 8 | 3 | 6 | Luciana de Armas | Uruguay | 28.17 | QSO |
| 10 | 5 | 3 | Michelle Surjadi Fang | Indonesia | 28.37 | |
| 11 | 4 | 6 | Wen Chu-ting | Chinese Taipei | 28.44 | |
| 12 | 5 | 1 | Neža Hren | Slovenia | 28.89 | |
| 13 | 5 | 7 | Beren Başaran | Turkey | 28.96 | |
| 14 | 4 | 2 | Alicia Story | Cook Islands | 29.25 | |
| 15 | 3 | 2 | Roselinda Matyayi | Namibia | 29.32 | |
| 16 | 3 | 7 | Saleste Gibson | Bahamas | 29.41 | |
| 17 | 3 | 8 | Ilef Omri | Tunisia | 29.65 | |
| 18 | 5 | 2 | Mikaela van den Berg | Aruba | 29.68 | |
| 19 | 4 | 3 | Grace Khelan | Fiji | 29.87 | |
| 20 | 3 | 1 | Seyni Fagueye Ndiaye | Senegal | 29.90 | |
| 21 | 4 | 7 | Melodi Saleshando | Botswana | 29.95 | |
| 22 | 4 | 8 | Omolola Akinsanmi | Nigeria | 30.47 | |
| 23 | 2 | 1 | Maria Kermanou | Cyprus | 30.61 | |
| 24 | 2 | 6 | Ângela Chicumbe | Mozambique | 30.92 | |
| 25 | 2 | 4 | Jada Yankey | Ghana | 30.96 | |
| 26 | 5 | 8 | Filbertha Demello | Tanzania | 31.03 | |
| 27 | 2 | 7 | Amna Thazkiyah Mirsaad | Maldives | 31.04 | |
| 28 | 2 | 2 | Cristhiane Añasco | Paraguay | 31.07 | |
| 29 | 4 | 1 | Kayra Tati | Cape Verde | 31.20 | |
| 30 | 2 | 3 | Maggie Mewett | Bermuda | 31.28 | |
| 31 | 2 | 5 | Dorianne Bristol | Seychelles | 31.76 | |
| 32 | 1 | 5 | Eltonique Leonard | Saint Vincent and the Grenadines | 31.81 | |
| 33 | 2 | 8 | Keziah Joseph | Antigua and Barbuda | 31.95 | |
| 34 | 1 | 4 | Hareem Malik | Pakistan | 32.77 | |
| 35 | 1 | 3 | Sara Al-Qarooni | Bahrain | 34.37 | |
| 36 | 1 | 7 | Fatoumata Bah | Guinea | 34.42 | |
| 37 | 1 | 8 | Kalisa Keza | Rwanda | 36.11 | |
| 38 | 1 | 2 | Samrawit Akele | Ethiopia | 36.29 | |
| 39 | 1 | 1 | Danielle Kanjadza | Malawi | 38.34 | |
| 40 | 1 | 6 | Axelle Tchatat | Republic of the Congo | 39.06 | |

=== Swim-off ===
The swim-off was held at 11:30.

| Rank | Lane | Name | Nationality | Time | Notes |
|---|---|---|---|---|---|
| 1 | 5 | Skyelar Richards | Jamaica | 27.78 | Q |
| 2 | 4 | Luciana de Armas | Uruguay | 28.28 | |

=== Final ===
The final was held at 15:56.

| Rank | Lane | Name | Nationality | Time | Notes |
|---|---|---|---|---|---|
| 1st place, gold medalist(s) | 4 | Serafima Fokina | Russia | 27.28 | |
| 2nd place, silver medalist(s) | 5 | Ana Bobanović | Croatia | 27.33 | |
| 3rd place, bronze medalist(s) | 3 | Fernanda García | Mexico | 27.49 | |
| 4 | 6 | Maari Randväli | Estonia | 27.63 | |
| 5 | 7 | Zofia Kowalska-Frączyk | Poland | 27.80 | |
| 6 | 2 | Ana Júlia Amaral | Brazil | 27.91 | |
| 7 | 1 | Cielo Moya | Peru | 28.18 | |
| 8 | 8 | Skyelar Richards | Jamaica | 28.24 | |
