= Bolivia at the 2026 Summer Youth Olympics =

- Flag of Bolivia
- IOC code: BOL
- NOC: Bolivian Olympic Committee
- Website: www.comiteolimpicoboliviano.org.bo

in Dakar, Senegal October 31, 2026 – November 13, 2026
- Competitors: 7 in 6 sports
- Flag bearers: Briana Iriarte & Alejandro Tordoya
- Medals: Gold 0 Silver 0 Bronze 0 Total 0

Summer Youth Olympics appearances
- 2010; 2014; 2018; 2026

Bolivia is scheduled to compete at the 2026 Summer Youth Olympics in Dakar, Senegal from October 31 to November 13, 2026. This will mark Bolivia's fourth appearance at the Youth Olympics, after making its debut in 2010.

Fencer Briana Iriarte and taekwondo practitioner Alejandro Tordoya served as the flag bearers for the opening ceremony.

== Competitors ==
The following is the list of number of competitors participating at the Games per sport/discipline.

Sport	Men	Women	Total
Artistic gymnastics	0	1	1
Athletics	1	0	1
Fencing	0	1	1
Road cycling	1	0	1
Swimming	1	1	2
Taekwondo	1	0	1
Total	4	3	7

== Artistic gymnastics ==
Bolivia entered one female gymnast.

Girls

Athlete	Event	Qualification						Final					
Athlete	Event	Apparatus				Total	Rank	Apparatus				Total	Rank
Athlete	Event	V	UB	BB	F	Total	Rank	V	UB	BB	F	Total	Rank
Mila Quiroga	All-around	11.466	7.666	8.600	9.933	37.665	50	did not qualify					

== Athletics ==
Bolivia entered one male athlete for the track and road events.

=== Track & road events ===
Men

Athlete	Event	Heat		Semifinal		Final	
Athlete	Event	Result	Rank	Result	Rank	Result	Rank
Jhamil Avendano	5000 m race walk						

== Fencing ==
Bolivia entered one female athlete.

Athlete	Event	Round of 64	Round of 32	Round of 16	Quarterfinal	Semifinal	Final / BM	
Athlete	Event	Opposition Score	Opposition Score	Opposition Score	Opposition Score	Opposition Score	Opposition Score	Rank
Briana Iriarte	Women's sabre							

== Road cycling ==
Bolivia entered one male athlete.

Men

Athlete	Event	Time	Rank
Rafael Bejarano	Road race		
Rafael Bejarano	Time trial		

== Swimming ==
Bolivia entered two swimmers, one male and one female.

Athlete	Event	Heat		Semifinal		Final	
Athlete	Event	Time	Rank	Time	Rank	Time	Rank
Remington Angerer	100 m breaststroke						
Remington Angerer	200 m breaststroke						
Remington Angerer	200 m individual medley						
Lucía Ordonez	50 m freestyle						
Lucía Ordonez	100 m freestyle	1:03.59	46	N/A	N/A	did not advance	did not advance

== Taekwondo ==
Bolivia entered one male athlete.

Men

Athlete	Event	Round of 16	Quarterfinals	Semifinals	Repechage	Final / BM	
Athlete	Event	Opposition Result	Opposition Result	Opposition Result	Opposition Result	Opposition Result	Rank
Alejandro Tordoya	-55 kg						
