= Central African Republic at the 2026 Summer Youth Olympics =

- IOC code: CAF
- NOC: Comité National Olympique et Sportif Centrafricain

in Dakar, Senegal 31 October – 13 November 2026
- Competitors: 3 in 3 sports
- Flag bearers: Divine Banzato & Nick Kembi
- Medals: Gold 0 Silver 0 Bronze 0 Total 0

Summer Youth Olympics appearances
- 2010; 2014; 2018; 2026

Central African Republic is scheduled to compete at the 2026 Summer Youth Olympics in Dakar, Senegal from 31 October to 13 November 2026. This will mark Central African Republic's fourth appearance at the Youth Olympics, after making its debut in 2010.

Athlete Divine Banzato and taekwondo practitioner Nick Kembi served as the flag bearers for the opening ceremony.

== Competitors ==
The following is the list of number of competitors participating at the Games.

Sport	Men	Women	Total
Athletics	0	1	1
Judo	1	0	1
Taekwondo	1	0	1
Total	2	1	3

== Athletics ==
Central African Republic entered one female athlete

=== Track and road events ===
Women

Athlete	Event	Semifinal		Final	
Athlete	Event	Result	Rank	Result	Rank
Divine Banzato	800 m				

== Judo ==
Central African Republic entered one male judoka based on the available quotas assigned by the International Judo Federation.

Athlete	Event	Round of 16	Quarterfinals	Semifinals	Repechage 1	Repechage 2	Final	
Athlete	Event	Opposition Result	Opposition Result	Opposition Result	Opposition Result	Opposition Result	Opposition Result	Rank
Ibrahim Moussa	Men's −55 kg	Tareen (AFG); W 100–0	Talibov (AZE); L 0–101	Did not advance	Juma (TAN); W 100–0	Yafunga (EOR); L 2–100	Did not advance	

== Taekwondo ==
Central African Republic entered one male athlete.

Men

Athlete	Event	Round of 16	Quarterfinals	Semifinals	Final	
Athlete	Event	Opposition Result	Opposition Result	Opposition Result	Opposition Result	Rank
Nick Kembi	−55 kg					
