= Nepal at the 2026 Summer Youth Olympics =

- Flag of Nepal
- IOC code: NEP
- NOC: Nepal Olympic Committee
- Website: www.nocnepal.org.np

in Dakar, Senegal October 31, 2026 – November 13, 2026
- Competitors: 4 in 3 sports
- Flag bearers: Aarya Maharjan & Aviv Pradhan
- Medals: Gold 0 Silver 0 Bronze 0 Total 0

Summer Youth Olympics appearances
- 2010; 2014; 2018; 2026

Nepal is scheduled to compete at the 2026 Summer Youth Olympics in Dakar, Senegal from October 31 to November 13, 2026. This will mark Nepal's fourth appearance at the Youth Olympics, after making its debut in 2010.

Swimmers Aarya Maharjan and Aviv Pradhan served as the flag bearers for the opening ceremony.

== Competitors ==
The following is the list of number of competitors participating at the Games per sport/discipline.

Sport	Men	Women	Total
Judo	1	0	1
Swimming	1	1	2
Wushu	0	1	1
Total	2	2	4

== Judo ==
Nepal entered one male judoka based on the available quotas assigned by the International Judo Federation.

Men

Athlete	Event	Round of 16	Quarterfinals	Semifinals	Repechage	Final / BM	
Athlete	Event	Opposition Result	Opposition Result	Opposition Result	Opposition Result	Opposition Result	Rank
Shubhanan Timalsina	–100 kg						

== Swimming ==
Nepal entered two swimmers, one male and one female.

Athlete	Event	Heat		Semifinal		Final	
Athlete	Event	Time	Rank	Time	Rank	Time	Rank
Aviv Pradhan	100 m freestyle	53.20	19	N/A	N/A	did not advance	did not advance
Aviv Pradhan	50 m butterfly						
Aarya Maharjan	50 m freestyle						
Aarya Maharjan	100 m freestyle	1:04.51	51	N/A	N/A	did not advance	did not advance

== Wushu ==
Nepal entered one female athlete after quotas were assigned by the International Wushu Federation.

Athlete	Event	Changquan routine		Gunshu routine		Total Points	Final Rank
Athlete	Event	Points	Rank	Points	Rank	Total Points	Final Rank
Rashmi Tamang	Women's changquan combined	7.026	11	6.096	12	13.122	12
