= Boxing at the 2026 Summer Youth Olympics =

Boxing competitions

Boxing at the IV Summer Youth Olympic Games
- Venue: Complexe Iba Mar Diop
- Dates: 7–12 November
- No. of events: 10 (5 boys, 5 girls)
- Competitors: 120 (60 boys and 60 girls) from 79 nations

Boxing at the 2026 Summer Youth Olympics was held from 7 to 12 November at the Complexe Iba Mar Diop in Dakar, Senegal.

== Qualification ==
=== Qualification summary ===
The allocation of the quota places was announced on 1 July 2026 by World Boxing.

NOC	Boys					Girls					Total
NOC	-50 kg	-55 kg	-60 kg	-65 kg	-70 kg	-48 kg	-51 kg	-54 kg	-57 kg	-60 kg	Total
Algeria				X		X			X	X	4
Armenia				X							1
Australia		X					X	X			3
Azerbaijan						X					1
Bangladesh					X						1
Belgium							X				1
Benin								X			1
Bhutan							X				1
Botswana							X				1
Brazil									X		1
Canada		X					X				2
China			X							X	2
Chinese Taipei									X		1
Colombia	X					X		X			3
Czech Republic					X						1
Dominican Republic		X									1
Ecuador					X				X		2
Egypt				X	X			X		X	4
Equatorial Guinea			X								1
France									X		1
Fiji			X							X	2
Finland		X									1
The Gambia			X								1
Georgia		X									1
Germany								X			1
Great Britain					X	X					2
Ghana					X						1
Guatemala			X								1
Honduras			X								1
Hong Kong	X										1
Hungary									X		1
Iran									X		1
Iraq	X										1
Ireland	X										1
Israel				X							1
Italy						X					1
India	X					X					2
Japan					X			X		X	3
Jordan				X			X				2
Kazakhstan					X			X	X		3
Kenya							X				1
Kyrgyzstan										X	1
Latvia					X						1
Lebanon		X									1
Libya		X									1
Lithuania										X	1
Mauritius		X	X								2
Mexico	X			X	X	X					4
Moldova				X							1
Mongolia						X					1
Morocco						X		X			2
Namibia	X										1
Netherlands										X	1
New Zealand	X						X				2
Nigeria						X					1
Panama							X				1
Poland							X		X		2
Puerto Rico			X								1
Romania	X							X			2
Samoa					X						1
Saudi Arabia		X									1
Senegal	X								X	X	3
Seychelles			X								1
Somalia	X										1
South Korea								X			1
Slovakia			X							X	2
Spain				X							1
Sweden		X									1
Tajikistan				X							1
Thailand			X			X					2
Togo		X									1
Trinidad and Tobago				X							1
Turkey			X			X					2
Turkmenistan	X	X									2
Tunisia									X		1
Ukraine									X	X	2
United Arab Emirates					X						1
Uzbekistan				X				X		X	3
Venezuela							X	X			2

== Medal summary ==
=== Medal table ===
* Host nation (Senegal)

Rank	Nation	Gold	Silver	Bronze	Total
1	India	2	0	0	2
1	Uzbekistan	2	0	0	2
3	Japan	1	0	2	3
4	Great Britain	1	0	1	2
5	Brazil	1	0	0	1
5	Georgia	1	0	0	1
5	Puerto Rico	1	0	0	1
5	Venezuela	1	0	0	1
9	Kazakhstan	0	2	1	3
10	Algeria	0	1	1	2
10	Colombia	0	1	1	2
12	Australia	0	1	0	1
12	Azerbaijan	0	1	0	1
12	Ireland	0	1	0	1
12	Israel	0	1	0	1
12	Slovakia	0	1	0	1
12	Thailand	0	1	0	1
18	Canada	0	0	2	2
18	Mexico	0	0	2	2
20	Armenia	0	0	1	1
20	China	0	0	1	1
20	Egypt	0	0	1	1
20	Hungary	0	0	1	1
20	Italy	0	0	1	1
20	Spain	0	0	1	1
20	Sweden	0	0	1	1
20	Turkey	0	0	1	1
20	Ukraine	0	0	1	1
20	United Arab Emirates	0	0	1	1
Totals (29 entries)		10	10	20	40

=== Men's events ===
Event	Gold	Silver	Bronze
50 kg	Ambekar Lairenlakpam; India	Kristian Jubani; Ireland	Alan Ocampo; Mexico
50 kg	Ambekar Lairenlakpam; India	Kristian Jubani; Ireland	Izzon Galea; Colombia
55 kg	Emil Ismailov; Georgia	Marley Dodd; Australia	Zaheer Changazi; Sweden
55 kg	Emil Ismailov; Georgia	Marley Dodd; Australia	Lisandro Garcia; Canada
60 kg	Jesfred Torres; Puerto Rico	Siwa Chainarong; Thailand	Muhammet Arlı; Turkey
60 kg	Jesfred Torres; Puerto Rico	Siwa Chainarong; Thailand	Zhang Zhengkun; China
65 kg	Kenshin Sakuno; Japan	Artur Prohnevsky; Israel	Suren Katvalyan; Armenia
65 kg	Kenshin Sakuno; Japan	Artur Prohnevsky; Israel	Pablo Souto; Spain
70 kg	Michael Maughan; Great Britain	Bibarys Ashirbay; Kazakhstan	Jorge Nieblas; Mexico
70 kg	Michael Maughan; Great Britain	Bibarys Ashirbay; Kazakhstan	Mohamed Moaaz; United Arab Emirates

=== Women's events ===
Event	Gold	Silver	Bronze
48 kg	Gunjan; India	Bouthaina Bensalah; Algeria	Michela Guglielmon; Italy
48 kg	Gunjan; India	Bouthaina Bensalah; Algeria	Lily Bassett; Great Britain
51 kg	Grenyelis García; Venezuela	Gular Huseynova; Azerbaijan	Cerine Kessal; Algeria
51 kg	Grenyelis García; Venezuela	Gular Huseynova; Azerbaijan	Mehreen Khakh; Canada
54 kg	Sabrina Chakomanova; Uzbekistan	Evelin Trejos; Colombia	Yura Kanemaru; Japan
54 kg	Sabrina Chakomanova; Uzbekistan	Evelin Trejos; Colombia	Maral Tolepbergen; Kazakhstan
57 kg	Sara Campos; Brazil	Aknur Tursyngali; Kazakhstan	Zsófia Kiss; Hungary
57 kg	Sara Campos; Brazil	Aknur Tursyngali; Kazakhstan	Yevanhelina Petruk; Ukraine
60 kg	Rushanabonu Isoeva; Uzbekistan	Karolína Kollárová; Slovakia	Ayano Mochii; Japan
60 kg	Rushanabonu Isoeva; Uzbekistan	Karolína Kollárová; Slovakia	Menatalla Ibrahim; Egypt
