= Bangladesh at the 2026 Summer Youth Olympics =

- Flag of Bangladesh
- IOC code: BAN
- NOC: Bangladesh Olympic Association
- Website: www.nocban.org

in Dakar, Senegal October 31, 2026 – November 13, 2026
- Competitors: 4 in 3 sports
- Flag bearers: Maisha Akter Mim & Md Abdul Ajimi
- Medals: Gold 0 Silver 0 Bronze 0 Total 0

Summer Youth Olympics appearances
- 2010; 2014; 2018; 2026

Bangladesh is scheduled to compete at the 2026 Summer Youth Olympics in Dakar, Senegal from October 31 to November 13, 2026. This will mark Bangladesh's fourth appearance at the Youth Olympics, after making its debut in 2010.

Swimmers Maisha Akter Mim and Md Abdul Ajimi served as the flag bearers for the opening ceremony.

== Competitors ==
The following is the list of number of competitors participating at the Games per sport/discipline.

Sport	Men	Women	Total
Athletics	1	0	1
Boxing	1	0	1
Swimming	1	1	2
Total	3	1	4

== Athletics ==
Bangladesh entered one male athlete.

=== Track & road events ===
Men

Athlete	Event	Heat		Semifinal		Final	
Athlete	Event	Result	Rank	Result	Rank	Result	Rank
Shipon Mia	100 m						

== Boxing ==
Bangladesh entered one male athlete in the −70 kg category.

Men

Athlete	Weight	Round of 16	Quarterfinals	Semifinals	Final / BM	
Athlete	Weight	Opposition Result	Opposition Result	Opposition Result	Opposition Result	Rank
Noyon Tripura Jani	–70 kg					

== Swimming ==
Bangladesh entered two swimmers, one male and one female.

Athlete	Event	Heat		Semifinal		Final	
Athlete	Event	Time	Rank	Time	Rank	Time	Rank
Md Abdul Ajimi	50 m freestyle						
Md Abdul Ajimi	100 m backstroke						
Maisha Akter Mim	50 m freestyle						
Maisha Akter Mim	100 m freestyle	1:08.26	59	N/A	N/A	did not advance	did not advance
