= Kyrgyzstan at the 2026 Summer Youth Olympics =

- Flag of Kyrgyzstan
- IOC code: KGZ
- NOC: National Olympic Committee of the Republic of Kyrgyzstan
- Website: www.olympic.kg

in Dakar, Senegal October 31, 2026 – November 13, 2026
- Competitors: 5 in 4 sports
- Flag bearers: Aaisha Kyialbekova & Daniel Nasredinov
- Medals: Gold 0 Silver 0 Bronze 1 Total 1

Summer Youth Olympics appearances (overview)
- 2010; 2014; 2018; 2026

Kyrgyzstan is scheduled to compete at the 2026 Summer Youth Olympics in Dakar, Senegal from October 31 to November 13, 2026. This will mark Kyrgyzstan's fourth appearance at the Youth Olympics, after making its debut in 2010.

Judoka Aaisha Kyialbekova and swimmer Daniel Nasredinov served as the flag bearers for the opening ceremony.

== Competitors ==
The following is the list of number of competitors participating at the Games per sport/discipline.

| Sport | Men | Women | Total |
|---|---|---|---|
| Athletics | 0 | 1 | 1 |
| Boxing | 0 | 1 | 1 |
| Judo | 0 | 1 | 1 |
| Swimming | 1 | 1 | 2 |
| Total | 1 | 4 | 5 |

== Athletics ==
Kyrgyzstan entered one female athlete.

=== Track & road events ===
Women

| Athlete | Event | Heat | | Semifinal | | Final | |
| Athlete | Event | Result | Rank | Result | Rank | Result | Rank |
|---|---|---|---|---|---|---|---|
| Ayana Beishenelieva | 1500 m | | | | | | |

== Boxing ==
Kyrgyzstan entered one female athlete in the −57 kg category.

Women

| Athlete | Weight | Round of 16 | Quarterfinals | Semifinals | Final / BM | |
| Athlete | Weight | Opposition Result | Opposition Result | Opposition Result | Opposition Result | Rank |
|---|---|---|---|---|---|---|
| Symbat Uraimzhanova | –60 kg | | | | | |

== Judo ==
Kyrgyzstan entered one female judoka based on the available quotas assigned by the International Judo Federation.

Women

| Athlete | Event | Round of 16 | Quarterfinals | Semifinals | Repechage | Final / BM | |
| Athlete | Event | Opposition Result | Opposition Result | Opposition Result | Opposition Result | Opposition Result | Rank |
|---|---|---|---|---|---|---|---|
| Aaisha Kyialbekova | –63 kg | | | | | | |

== Swimming ==
Kyrgyzstan entered two swimmers, one male and one female.

| Athlete | Event | Heat | | Semifinal | | Final | |
| Athlete | Event | Time | Rank | Time | Rank | Time | Rank |
|---|---|---|---|---|---|---|---|
| Daniel Nasredinov | 100 m freestyle | | | | | | |
| Daniel Nasredinov | 400 m freestyle | | | | | | |
| Daniel Nasredinov | 800 m freestyle | | | | | | |
| Aiymkyz Airaralieva | 100 m freestyle | | | | | | |
| Aiymkyz Airaralieva | 400 m freestyle | | | | | | |
| Aiymkyz Airaralieva | 800 m freestyle | | | | | | |
