= Tuvalu at the 2026 Summer Youth Olympics =

- Flag of Tonga
- IOC code: TUV
- NOC: Tuvalu Association of Sports and National Olympic Committee
- Website: www.oceaniasport.com/tuvalu

in Dakar, Senegal October 31, 2026 – November 13, 2026
- Competitors: 2 in 1 sport
- Flag bearers: Luisa Vila & Lotesi Mesu
- Medals: Gold 0 Silver 0 Bronze 0 Total 0

Summer Youth Olympics appearances
- 2010; 2014; 2018; 2026

Tuvalu is scheduled to compete at the 2026 Summer Youth Olympics in Dakar, Senegal from October 31 to November 13, 2026. This will mark Tuvalu's fourth appearance at the Youth Olympics, after making its debut in 2010.

Athletes Luisa Vila and Lotesi Mesu served as the flag bearers for the opening ceremony.

== Competitors ==
The following is the list of number of competitors participating at the Games per sport/discipline.

Sport	Men	Women	Total
Athletics	1	1	2
Total	1	1	2

== Athletics ==
Tuvalu entered two athletes, one male and one female.

Field events

Athlete	Event	Final	
Athlete	Event	Distance	Rank
Lotesi Mesu	Men's javelin throw		
Luisa Vila	Women's discus throw		
