= Afghanistan at the 2026 Summer Youth Olympics =

- Flag of Afghanistan (Note: Afghanistan competes under the tricolor flag used by the Islamic Republic and not the white banner preferred by the Taliban.)
- IOC code: AFG
- NOC: National Olympic Committee of the Islamic Republic of Afghanistan

in Dakar, Senegal October 31, 2026 – November 13, 2026
- Competitors: 13 in 3 sports
- Flag bearers: Fatemeh Jami & Ahmad Esmaeili
- Medals: Gold 0 Silver 0 Bronze 0 Total 0

Summer Youth Olympics appearances
- 2010; 2014; 2018; 2026

Afghanistan is scheduled to compete at the 2026 Summer Youth Olympics in Dakar, Senegal from October 31 to November 13, 2026. This will mark Afghanistan's fourth appearance at the Youth Olympics, after making its debut in 2010.

Taekwondo practitioner Fatemeh Jami and futsal player Ahmad Esmaeili served as the flag bearers for the opening ceremony.

== Competitors ==
The following is the list of number of competitors participating at the Games per sport/discipline.

Sport	Men	Women	Total
Futsal	10	0	10
Judo	1	0	1
Taekwondo	1	1	2
Total	12	1	13

== Futsal ==
Afghanistan entered a team for the men's tournament.

Summary

Event	Group stage				Semifinal	Final / BM	
Event	Opposition Score	Opposition Score	Opposition Score	Group Rank	Opposition Score	Opposition Score	Rank
Men's tournament	Senegal; W 6–0	Argentina; L 1–2	Panama; W 5–0	2 Q	Portugal; L 0–2	Morocco; L 1–2	4

Roster

- Zakir Abdullahi
- Ali Ahmadi
- Mohammad Akbari
- Wasay Bahadur
- Ahmad Esmaeli
- Abolfazi Haqani
- Hussain Hassani
- Reza Karimi
- Farhad Nazari
- Amir Qassemi

== Judo ==
Afghanistan entered one male judoka based on the available quotas assigned by the International Judo Federation.

Men

Athlete	Event	Round of 16	Quarterfinals	Semifinals	Repechage 1	Repechage 2	Final / BM
Athlete	Event	Opposition Result	Opposition Result	Opposition Result	Opposition Result	Opposition Result	Rank
Jahan Tareen	–55 kg	Ibrahim Moussa (CAF) L Walkover	Did not advance		Botay Arno Yafunga (EOR) L Walkover	Did not advance	=9

== Taekwondo ==
Afghanistan entered two athletes, one of each gender.

Men

Athlete	Event	Round of 16	Quarterfinals	Semifinals	Repechage	Final / BM	
Athlete	Event	Opposition Result	Opposition Result	Opposition Result	Opposition Result	Opposition Result	Rank
Ozair Rashid	–55 kg						

Women

Athlete	Event	Round of 16	Quarterfinals	Semifinals	Repechage	Final / BM	
Athlete	Event	Opposition Result	Opposition Result	Opposition Result	Opposition Result	Opposition Result	Rank
Fatemeh Jami	–63 kg						
