= Federated States of Micronesia at the 2026 Summer Youth Olympics =

- Flag of Brazil
- IOC code: FSM
- NOC: Federated States of Micronesia National Olympic Committee
- Website: www.oceaniasport.com/fsm

in Dakar, Senegal October 31, 2026 – November 13, 2026
- Competitors: 1 in 1 sport
- Flag bearer: Kaylinn Kihleng
- Medals: Gold 0 Silver 0 Bronze 0 Total 0

Summer Youth Olympics appearances
- 2010; 2014; 2018; 2026

Federated States of Micronesia is scheduled to compete at the 2026 Summer Youth Olympics in Dakar, Senegal from October 31 to November 13, 2026. This will mark Federated States of Micronesia's fourth appearance at the Youth Olympics, after making its debut in 2010.

Swimmer Kaylinn Kihleng served as the flag bearer for the opening ceremony.

== Competitors ==
The following is the list of number of competitors participating at the Games per sport/discipline.

Sport	Men	Women	Total
Swimming	0	1	1
Total	0	1	1

== Swimming ==
The Federated States of Micronesia qualified one female swimmer via universality place selection from World Aquatics.

Athlete	Event	Heats		Final	
Athlete	Event	Time	Rank	Time	Rank
Kaylinn Kihleng	Women's 50 m freestyle				
Kaylinn Kihleng	Women's 100 m freestyle	1:07.17	58	Did not advance	Did not advance
Kaylinn Kihleng	Women's 200 m freestyle				
Kaylinn Kihleng	Women's 50 m breaststroke				
