= Malawi at the 2026 Summer Youth Olympics =

- Flag of Malawi
- IOC code: MAW
- NOC: Olympic and Commonwealth Games Association of Malawi

in Dakar, Senegal October 31, 2026 – November 13, 2026
- Competitors: 4 in 3 sports
- Flag bearers: Happiness Mtukula & Tasunje Mkavea
- Medals: Gold 0 Silver 0 Bronze 0 Total 0

Summer Youth Olympics appearances
- 2010; 2014; 2018; 2026

Malawi is scheduled to compete at the 2026 Summer Youth Olympics in Dakar, Senegal from October 31 to November 13, 2026. This will mark Malawi's fourth appearance at the Youth Olympics, after making its debut in 2010.

Judoka Happiness Mtukula and swimmer Tasunje Mkavea served as the flag bearers for the opening ceremony.

== Competitors ==
The following is the list of number of competitors participating at the Games per sport/discipline.

Sport	Men	Women	Total
Athletics	1	0	1
Judo	0	1	1
Swimming	1	1	2
Total	2	2	4

== Athletics ==
Malawi entered one male athlete.

=== Track & road events ===
Men

Athlete	Event	Semifinal		Final	
Athlete	Event	Result	Rank	Result	Rank
Ishmael Spakar	100 m				

== Judo ==
Malawi entered one female judoka based on the available quotas assigned by the International Judo Federation.

Women

Athlete	Event	Round of 16	Quarterfinals	Semifinals	Repechage 1	Repechage 2	Final	
Athlete	Event	Opposition Result	Opposition Result	Opposition Result	Opposition Result	Opposition Result	Opposition Result	Rank
Happiness Mtukula	–63 kg							

== Swimming ==
Malawi entered two swimmers, one of each gender.

Athlete	Event	Heat		Final	
Athlete	Event	Time	Rank	Time	Rank
Tasunje Mkavea	100 m freestyle				
Tasunje Mkavea	50 m butterfly				
Tasunje Mkavea	50 m breaststroke				
Tasunje Mkavea	100 m breaststroke				
Danielle Kanjadza	50 m freestyle				
Danielle Kanjadza	100 m freestyle				
Danielle Kanjadza	50 m butterfly				
Danielle Kanjadza	100 m butterfly				
