= Jordan at the 2026 Summer Youth Olympics =

- Flag of Jordan
- IOC code: JOR
- NOC: Jordan Olympic Committee
- Website: www.joc.jo

in Dakar, Senegal October 31, 2026 – November 13, 2026
- Competitors: 13 in 8 sports
- Flag bearer: Michael El Werr
- Medals: Gold 0 Silver 1 Bronze 0 Total 1

Summer Youth Olympics appearances
- 2010; 2014; 2018; 2026

Jordan is scheduled to compete at the 2026 Summer Youth Olympics in Dakar, Senegal from October 31 to November 13, 2026. This will mark Jordan's fourth appearance at the Youth Olympics, after making its debut in 2010.

Swimmer Michael El Werr served as the flag bearer for the opening ceremony.

== Competitors ==
The following is the list of number of competitors participating at the Games per sport/discipline.

Sport	Men	Women	Total
Athletics	1	0	1
Beach wrestling	1	0	1
Boxing	1	1	2
Fencing	0	1	1
Judo	0	1	1
Swimming	1	1	2
Taekwondo	2	2	4
Triathlon	0	1	1
Total	6	7	13

== Athletics ==
Jordan entered one male athlete.

=== Track & road events ===
Men

Athlete	Event	Heat		Semifinal		Final	
Athlete	Event	Result	Rank	Result	Rank	Result	Rank
Qusai Alramadin	1500 m						

== Beach wrestling ==
Jordan entered one male athlete.

Men

Athlete	Weight	Round of 16	Quarterfinals	Semifinals	Final / BM	
Athlete	Weight	Opposition Result	Opposition Result	Opposition Result	Opposition Result	Rank
Adam Abu Fare	–50 kg					

== Boxing ==
Jordan entered two athletes, one male and one female.

Men

Athlete	Weight	Round of 16	Quarterfinals	Semifinals	Final / BM	
Athlete	Weight	Opposition Result	Opposition Result	Opposition Result	Opposition Result	Rank
Abdallah Toghoz	–65 kg					

Women

Athlete	Weight	Round of 16	Quarterfinals	Semifinals	Final / BM	
Athlete	Weight	Opposition Result	Opposition Result	Opposition Result	Opposition Result	Rank
Tala Hussein	–51 kg					

== Fencing ==
Jordan entered one female athlete.

Athlete	Event	Round of 64	Round of 32	Round of 16	Quarterfinal	Semifinal	Final / BM	
Athlete	Event	Opposition Score	Opposition Score	Opposition Score	Opposition Score	Opposition Score	Opposition Score	Rank
Celine Abu Obeid	Women's foil							

== Judo ==
Jordan entered one female judoka based on the available quotas assigned by the International Judo Federation.

Women

Athlete	Event	Round of 16	Quarterfinals	Semifinals	Repechage	Final / BM	
Athlete	Event	Opposition Result	Opposition Result	Opposition Result	Opposition Result	Opposition Result	Rank
Houda Wshah	–44 kg						

== Swimming ==
Jordan entered two swimmers, one male and one female.

Athlete	Event	Heat		Semifinal		Final	
Athlete	Event	Time	Rank	Time	Rank	Time	Rank
Michael El Werr	50 m freestyle						
Michael El Werr	100 m freestyle						
Michael El Werr	200 m freestyle						
Serina Mehyar	50 m freestyle						
Serina Mehyar	100 m freestyle						
Serina Mehyar	400 m freestyle						

== Taekwondo ==
Jordan entered a team of four athletes, two of each gender.

Men

Athlete	Event	Round of 16	Quarterfinals	Semifinals	Repechage	Final / BM	
Athlete	Event	Opposition Result	Opposition Result	Opposition Result	Opposition Result	Opposition Result	Rank
Abdallah Alzawahra	–63 kg						
Ahmad Aldahamsheh	–73 kg						

Women

Athlete	Event	Round of 16	Quarterfinals	Semifinals	Repechage	Final / BM	
Athlete	Event	Opposition Result	Opposition Result	Opposition Result	Opposition Result	Opposition Result	Rank
Laean Alrawashdeh	–55 kg						
Zainab Busila	–63 kg						

Mixed

Athlete	Event	Round of 16	Quarterfinals	Semifinals	Repechage	Final / BM	
Athlete	Event	Opposition Result	Opposition Result	Opposition Result	Opposition Result	Opposition Result	Rank
Abdallah Alzawahra; Ahmad Aldahamsheh; Laen Alrawashdeh; Zairab Busila	Mixed team						

== Triathlon ==
Jordan entered one female athlete.

Athlete	Event	Time						Rank
Athlete	Event	Swim (750m)	Trans 1	Bike (20km)	Trans 2	Run (5km)	Total	Rank
Maria Alhaddadein	Women's individual							
