= Ghana at the 2026 Summer Youth Olympics =

- Flag of Ghana
- IOC code: GHA
- NOC: Ghana Olympic Committee
- Website: www.ghanaolympic.org

in Dakar, Senegal October 31, 2026 – November 13, 2026
- Competitors: 13 in 8 sports
- Flag bearer: Obabompa Adu-mintah
- Medals: Gold 0 Silver 0 Bronze 0 Total 0

Summer Youth Olympics appearances
- 2010; 2014; 2018; 2026

Ghana is scheduled to compete at the 2026 Summer Youth Olympics in Dakar, Senegal from October 31 to November 13, 2026. This will mark Ghana's fourth appearance at the Youth Olympics, after making its debut in 2010.

Badminton player Obabompa Adu-mintah served as the flag bearer for the opening ceremony.

== Competitors ==
The following is the list of number of competitors participating at the Games per sport/discipline.

Sport	Men	Women	Total
Athletics	1	1	2
Badminton	1	0	1
Beach volleyball	2	0	2
Boxing	1	0	1
Judo	0	1	1
Swimming	2	2	4
Table tennis	0	1	1
Taekwondo	0	1	1
Total	7	6	14

== Athletics ==
Ghana entered two athletes, one of each gender.

=== Track & road events ===
Men

Athlete	Event	Semifinal		Final	
Athlete	Event	Result	Rank	Result	Rank
Stephen Oduro	400 m hurdles				

Women

Athlete	Event	Semifinal		Final	
Athlete	Event	Result	Rank	Result	Rank
Mary Coffie	400 m hurdles				

== Badminton ==
Ghana entered one male athlete.

Athlete	Event	Group stage				Quarterfinal	Semifinal	Final / BM	
Athlete	Event	Opposition Score	Opposition Score	Opposition Score	Rank	Opposition Score	Opposition Score	Opposition Score	Rank
Obapomba Adumintah	Men's singles								

== Beach volleyball ==
Ghana received a quota place for the men's tournament.

Summary

Team	Event	Group stage				Round of 16	Quarterfinals	Semifinals	Final / BM	
Team	Event	Opposition Result	Opposition Result	Opposition Result	Rank	Opposition Result	Opposition Result	Opposition Result	Opposition Result	Rank
Gabriel Campos; Bruno Souza	Men's tournament									

== Boxing ==
Ghana entered one male athlete in the −70 kg category.

Men

Athlete	Weight	Round of 16	Quarterfinals	Semifinals	Final	
Athlete	Weight	Opposition Result	Opposition Result	Opposition Result	Opposition Result	Rank
Robert Tagoe	–70 kg					

== Judo ==
Ghana entered one female judoka based on the available quotas assigned by the International Judo Federation.

Men

Athlete	Event	Round of 16	Quarterfinals	Semifinals	Repechage 1	Repechage 2	Final	
Athlete	Event	Opposition Result	Opposition Result	Opposition Result	Opposition Result	Opposition Result	Opposition Result	Rank
Bernice Akakpo	–63 kg							

== Swimming ==
Ghana entered four swimmers, two of each gender.

Athlete	Event	Heat		Final	
Athlete	Event	Time	Rank	Time	Rank
Kelvin Abdallah	50 m freestyle				
Kelvin Abdallah	50 m backstroke				
Tamba Boamah	100 m freestyle				
Tamba Boamah	50 m breaststroke				
Tamba Boamah	100 m breaststroke				
Tamba Boamah	200 m breaststroke				
Mercedes Abdallah	50 m backstroke				
Mercedes Abdallah	100 m backstroke				
Jada Yankey	50 m freestyle				
Jada Yankey	100 m freestyle				
Jada Yankey	50 m breaststroke				
Jada Yankey	50 m butterfly				

== Table tennis ==
Ghana entered one female athlete.

Athlete	Event	Group stage				Round of 32	Round of 16	Quarterfinal	Semifinal	Final	
Athlete	Event	Opposition Result	Opposition Result	Opposition Result	Rank	Opposition Result	Opposition Result	Opposition Result	Opposition Result	Opposition Result	Rank
Joanita Borteye	Women's singles										

== Taekwondo ==
Ghana entered one female athlete.

Women

Athlete	Event	Round of 16	Quarterfinals	Semifinals	Repechage	Final / BM	
Athlete	Event	Opposition Result	Opposition Result	Opposition Result	Opposition Result	Opposition Result	Rank
Jessica Mensah	+63 kg	Bye					
