= Swimming at the 2026 Summer Youth Olympics – Women's 100 metre freestyle =

Women's 100 metre freestyle at the 2026 Summer Youth Olympics
- Venue: Complexe Tour de l'Oeuf
- Dates: 2 November
- Competitors: 64 from 64 nations
- Winning time: 55.89

Medalists
gold medal	Ana Bobanović	Croatia
silver medal	Alyssa Lawson	New Zealand
bronze medal	Dhinidhi Desinghu	India

The women's 100 metre freestyle event at the 2026 Summer Youth Olympics took place on 2 November at the Complexe Tour de l'Oeuf in Dakar, Senegal.

== Results ==
=== Heats ===
The heats were started at 10:00.

Rank	Heat	Lane	Name	Nationality	Time	Notes
1	8	5	Ana Bobanović	Croatia	56.22	Q
2	8	4	Alyssa Lawson	New Zealand	56.53	Q
3	9	5	Dhinidhi Desinghu	India	56.80	Q
4	7	4	Beren Başaran	Turkey	57.07	Q
5	9	4	Nguyễn Thúy Hiền	Vietnam	57.17	Q
6	9	3	Palina Bialiauskaya	Belarus	57.94	Q
7	7	3	Rebeka Tamás	Hungary	58.21	Q
8	6	5	Wen Chu-ting	Chinese Taipei	58.25	Q
9	7	5	Maria Corlateanu	Moldova	58.27	
10	2	7	Serafima Fokina	Russia	58.82	
11	8	8	Skyelar Richards	Jamaica	58.95	
12	7	1	Aiymkyz Aidaralieva	Kyrgyzstan	59.23	
12	8	2	Alexis Johnsen	Zimbabwe	59.23	
14	8	7	Reagan Uszenski	Virgin Islands	59.31	
14	9	7	Nafanua Hamilton	Samoa	59.31	
16	9	2	Gabriela Becerra	Colombia	59.41	
17	9	6	Simona Ivanova	Bulgaria	59.47	
18	7	8	Antonella Aybar	Dominican Republic	59.50	
19	7	2	Lena Begenišić	Serbia	59.58	
20	8	6	Grace Khelan	Fiji	59.65	
21	8	1	Sophia Berganza	Guatemala	59.94	
22	7	6	Shannon Tan Yan Qing	Malaysia	59.98	
23	9	8	Yulya Bonnici	Malta	1:00.05	
24	8	3	Cielo Moya	Peru	1:00.35	
25	6	8	Margherita Gregoroni	San Marino	1:00.54	
26	6	4	Saleste Gibson	Bahamas	1:00.73	
27	6	6	Leah Markgraaff	South Africa	1:00.87	
28	6	7	Anastasia Mikelashvili	Georgia	1:00.91	
29	4	8	Ilef Zouaghi	Tunisia	1:01.16	
30	5	7	Macrine Kalombo	Kenya	1:01.18	
31	4	7	Madison Bergh	Namibia	1:01.40	
32	9	1	Mikaela van den Berg	Aruba	1:01.60	
33	4	4	Marta Biagini	Senegal	1:01.92	
34	6	3	Océane Rakotonanahary	Madagascar	1:02.02	
35	5	8	Jada Yankey	Ghana	1:02.15	
36	5	3	Maryam Javadova	Azerbaijan	1:02.53	
36	5	5	Ângela Chicumbe	Mozambique	1:02.53	
38	5	4	Isabela Matarrita	Costa Rica	1:02.60	
39	6	2	Rhalmane Yasmin	Morocco	1:02.76	
40	5	6	Breanna Belmar	Trinidad and Tobago	1:02.77	
41	4	5	Dorianne Bristol	Seychelles	1:02.80	
42	3	5	Serina Mehyar	Jordan	1:02.85	
43	5	1	Crissa Dillip	Tanzania	1:02.96	
44	4	2	Omolola Akinsanmi	Nigeria	1:03.33	
45	4	3	Yohamy Flores	El Salvador	1:03.47	
46	4	6	Lucia Ordóñez	Bolivia	1:03.59	
47	6	1	Badrakhyn Orgilmaa	Mongolia	1:03.77	
48	5	2	Giulliana Ramírez	Honduras	1:04.07	
49	3	4	Roxanne Kirarock	Papua New Guinea	1:04.12	
50	3	3	Yasmine Al-Sabih	Kuwait	1:04.27	
51	3	2	Aarya Maharjan	Nepal	1:04.51	
52	3	6	Keziah Joseph	Antigua and Barbuda	1:04.63	
53	3	7	Maria Parimbelli	Angola	1:05.09	
54	3	1	Eltonique Leonard	Saint Vincent and the Grenadines	1:05.15	
55	2	6	Elya Powdar	Suriname	1:06.18	
56	4	1	Loïs Eliora Irishura	Burundi	1:06.35	
57	2	4	Luseane Limoni	Tonga	1:06.40	
58	2	3	Kaylinn Kihleng	Federated States of Micronesia	1:07.17	
59	3	8	Maisha Akter Mim	Bangladesh	1:08.26	
60	2	5	Aragsan Mugabo	Rwanda	1:08.54	
61	2	2	Kamila Ibrahim	Comoros	1:09.22	
62	1	5	Sofiyakhon Gazieva	Tajikistan	1:11.89	
63	1	4	Danielle Kanjadza	Malawi	1:12.66	
64	1	3	Tina Apithy	Benin	1:25.97	
	7	7	Kayra Tati	Cape Verde	Did not start	

=== Final ===
The final was held at 15:00.

Rank	Lane	Name	Nationality	Time	Notes
1st place, gold medalist(s)	4	Ana Bobanović	Croatia	55.89	
2nd place, silver medalist(s)	5	Alyssa Lawson	New Zealand	56.13	
3rd place, bronze medalist(s)	3	Dhinidhi Desinghu	India	56.27	
4	6	Beren Başaran	Turkey	56.63	
5	2	Nguyễn Thúy Hiền	Vietnam	56.68	
6	7	Palina Bialiauskaya	Belarus	57.17	
7	1	Rebeka Tamás	Hungary	57.81	
8	8	Wen Chu-ting	Chinese Taipei	57.88	
