= Ana Bobanović =

Croatian swimmer (born 2009)

Personal information
- Nationality: Croatian
- Born: 30 March 2009 (age 17)

Sport
- Sport: Swimming
- Club: PK Primorje
- Coach: Krešimir Čač
Medal record
Women's swimming
Representing Croatia
Youth Olympic Games
Gold medal – first place	2026 Dakar	50 m freestyle
Gold medal – first place	2026 Dakar	100 m freestyle
Silver medal – second place	2026 Dakar	50 m butterfly
Silver medal – second place	2026 Dakar	200 m freestyle

Ana Bobanović (born 30 March 2009) is a Croatian swimmer. She won four medals at the 2026 Summer Youth Olympics, including two gold and two silver medals.

== Career ==
Bobanović received a scholarship from Marin Čilić for sports youth. In November 2026, she represented Croatia at the 2026 Summer Youth Olympics and served as the flag bearer during the opening ceremony. She won a gold medal in the 100 metre freestyle with a time of 55.89 seconds. This was Croatia's third gold medal in swimming in the history of the Summer Youth Olympic Games. She then won a gold medal in the 50 metre freestyle with a time of 25.45 seconds. She also won a silver medal in the 50 metre butterfly with a time of 27.33 seconds. On the final day of the competition she won a silver medal in the 200 metre freestyle with a time of 2:01.17. She finished the 2026 Summer Youth Olympics as Croatia's most decorated athlete with four medals.

== Personal life ==
Bobanović attends Salesian Gymnasium in Rijeka.
