= Ayo (mascot) =

Mascot of the 2026 Summer Youth Olympics

- Ayo, mascot of the 2026 Summer Youth Olympics
- Description: Young lion
- Origin of name: Yoruba for "joy"
- First seen: 31 October 2025

Ayo is the official mascot of the 2026 Summer Youth Olympics. The Games were held in Dakar, Diamniadio and Saly, Senegal, from 31 October to 13 November 2026.

Ayo is a young lion. It represents the joy and energy of Senegalese youth.

== Name ==
The name Ayo means "joy" in Yoruba, a language of West Africa.

== Creation ==
The organising committee of the Games held a national competition. It was organised with the Senegalese Ministry of National Education. The competition was open to secondary school pupils. Nearly 500 pupils took part.

Ayo was designed by Ndeye Mariama Diop, a 16-year-old pupil. The name was proposed by another pupil, aged 18.

Ayo was presented to the public on 31 October 2025. The ceremony took place at the Grand Théâtre national in Dakar. It marked one year before the start of the Games.

== Description ==
Ayo in Dakar

Ayo is a smiling young lion. It wears a tingandé. The tingandé is a traditional hat of the Fula people. The hat symbolises wisdom and dignity.

Ayo also wears a white football shirt with the Dakar 2026 emblem. Its shorts are red, yellow and green.

== See also ==
- List of Olympic mascots
