= El Salvador at the 2026 Summer Youth Olympics =

- Flag of El Salvador
- IOC code: ESA
- NOC: El Salvador Olympic Committee
- Website: www.olympic.org/el-salvador

in Dakar, Senegal October 31, 2026 – November 13, 2026
- Competitors: 6 in 4 sports
- Flag bearers: Natalia Townsend & Niccolo Pilenga
- Medals: Gold 0 Silver 0 Bronze 0 Total 0

Summer Youth Olympics appearances
- 2010; 2014; 2018; 2026

El Salvador is scheduled to compete at the 2026 Summer Youth Olympics in Dakar, Senegal from October 31 to November 13, 2026. This will mark El Salvador's fourth appearance at the Youth Olympics, after making its debut in 2010.

Rower Natalia Townsend and swimmer Niccolo Pilenga served as the flag bearers for the opening ceremony.

== Competitors ==
The following is the list of number of competitors participating at the Games per sport/discipline.

Sport	Men	Women	Total
Athletics	0	2	2
Coastal rowing	0	1	1
Fencing	0	1	1
Swimming	1	1	2
Total	1	5	6

== Athletics ==
El Salvador entered two female athletes.

=== Track & road events ===
Women

Athlete	Event	Semi Final		Final	
Athlete	Event	Result	Rank	Result	Rank
Ashly Benítez	800 m	2:23.51	9 Q		
Krissia Martínez	2000 m steeplechase			7:27.09	8

== Coastal rowing ==
El Salvador entered one female rower.

Women

Athlete	Event	Round of 16	Quarterfinals	Semifinals	Final / BM	
Athlete	Event	Opposition Result	Opposition Result	Opposition Result	Opposition Result	Rank
Natalia Townsend	Solo					

== Fencing ==
Brazil entered one female athlete.

Athlete	Event	Round of 64	Round of 32	Round of 16	Quarterfinal	Semifinal	Final / BM	
Athlete	Event	Opposition Score	Opposition Score	Opposition Score	Opposition Score	Opposition Score	Opposition Score	Rank
Kristy Villacorta	Women's sabre							

== Swimming ==
El Salvador entered two swimmers, one male and one female.

Athlete	Event	Heat		Semifinal		Final	
Athlete	Event	Time	Rank	Time	Rank	Time	Rank
Niccolo Pilenga	50 m freestyle						
Niccolo Pilenga	100 m freestyle						
Niccolo Pilenga	50 m butterfly						
Yohamy Flores	100 m freestyle	1:03.47	45	N/A	N/A	did not advance	did not advance
Yohamy Flores	50 m breaststroke						
Yohamy Flores	100 m breaststroke						
