= Saudi Arabia at the 2026 Summer Youth Olympics =

- Flag of Saudi Arabia
- IOC code: KSA
- NOC: Saudi Arabian Olympic Committee
- Website: www.olympic.sa

in Dakar, Senegal October 31, 2026 – November 13, 2026
- Competitors: 14 in 9 sports
- Flag bearers: Reem Alshammari & Wafi Aljasir
- Medals: Gold 1 Silver 0 Bronze 0 Total 1

Summer Youth Olympics appearances
- 2010; 2014; 2018; 2026

Saudi Arabia is scheduled to compete at the 2026 Summer Youth Olympics in Dakar, Senegal from October 31 to November 13, 2026. This will mark Saudi Arabia's fourth appearance at the Youth Olympics, after making its debut in 2010.

Taekwondo practitioner Reem Alshammari and beach volleyball player Wafi Aljasir served as the flag bearers for the opening ceremony.

== Competitors ==
The following is the list of number of competitors participating at the Games per sport/discipline.

Sport	Men	Women	Total
Athletics	2	0	2
Beach volleyball	2	0	2
Coastal rowing	1	0	1
Boxing	1	0	1
Fencing	1	0	1
Judo	1	0	1
Swimming	1	0	1
Taekwondo	2	2	4
Triathlon	1	0	1
Total	12	2	14

== Athletics ==
Saudi Arabia entered two male athletes.

=== Track & road events ===
Men

Athlete	Event	Heat		Semifinal		Final	
Athlete	Event	Result	Rank	Result	Rank	Result	Rank
Naif Alsmairi	110 m hurdles						

=== Field events ===
Men

Athlete	Event	Qualification		Final	
Athlete	Event	Distance	Position	Distance	Position
Mohammed Alsubaei	Discus throw				

== Beach volleyball ==
Saudi Arabia received a quota place for the men's tournament.

Summary

Team	Event	Group stage				Round of 16	Quarterfinals	Semifinals	Final / PG / BM	
Team	Event	Opposition Result	Opposition Result	Opposition Result	Rank	Opposition Result	Opposition Result	Opposition Result	Opposition Result	Rank
Ali Alawami; Wafi Aljasir	Men's tournament									

== Boxing ==
Saudi Arabia entered one male athlete in the −55 kg category.

Men

Athlete	Weight	Round of 16	Quarterfinals	Semifinals	Final / BM	
Athlete	Weight	Opposition Result	Opposition Result	Opposition Result	Opposition Result	Rank
Naif Ghazwani	–55 kg					

== Coastal rowing ==
Saudi Arabia entered one male rower.

Men

Athlete	Event	Time trial 1		Time trial 2		Round of 16	Quarterfinal	Semifinal	Final	
Athlete	Event	Time	Rank	Time	Rank	Opposition Time	Opposition Time	Opposition Time	Opposition Time	Rank
Dhari Alabbas	Solo	2:49.63	13							

== Fencing ==
Saudi Arabia entered one male athlete.

Athlete	Event	Round of 64	Round of 32	Round of 16	Quarterfinal	Semifinal	Final / BM	
Athlete	Event	Opposition Score	Opposition Score	Opposition Score	Opposition Score	Opposition Score	Opposition Score	Rank
Ali Alfuyaza	Men's épée							

== Judo ==
Saudi Arabia entered one male judoka based on the available quotas assigned by the International Judo Federation.

Men

Athlete	Event	Round of 16	Quarterfinals	Semifinals	Repechage	Final / BM	
Athlete	Event	Opposition Result	Opposition Result	Opposition Result	Opposition Result	Opposition Result	Rank
Mutaz Hebah	–55 kg						

== Swimming ==
Saudi Arabia entered one male swimmer.

Athlete	Event	Heat		Semifinal		Final	
Athlete	Event	Time	Rank	Time	Rank	Time	Rank
Rami Al-Rahmouni	200 m freestyle						
Rami Al-Rahmouni	400 m freestyle						
Rami Al-Rahmouni	800 m freestyle						

== Taekwondo ==
Saudi Arabia entered a team of four athletes, two of each gender.

Men

Athlete	Event	Round of 16	Quarterfinals	Semifinals	Repechage	Final / BM	
Athlete	Event	Opposition Result	Opposition Result	Opposition Result	Opposition Result	Opposition Result	Rank
Mohammed Almohammedsaleh	–63 kg						
Fawaz Almasaari	–73 kg						

Women

Athlete	Event	Round of 16	Quarterfinals	Semifinals	Repechage	Final / BM	
Athlete	Event	Opposition Result	Opposition Result	Opposition Result	Opposition Result	Opposition Result	Rank
Reem Alshammari	–55 kg						
Gharam Kaabi	–63 kg						

Mixed

Athlete	Event	Round of 16	Quarterfinals	Semifinals	Repechage	Final / BM	
Athlete	Event	Opposition Result	Opposition Result	Opposition Result	Opposition Result	Opposition Result	Rank
Mohammed Almohammedsaleh; Fawaz Almasaari; Reem Alshammari; Gharam Kaabi	Mixed team						

== Triathlon ==
Saudi Arabia entered one male athlete.

Athlete	Event	Time						Rank
Athlete	Event	Swim (750m)	Trans 1	Bike (20 km)	Trans 2	Run (5 km)	Total	Rank
Feher Moussa	Men's individual							
