= Saint Vincent and the Grenadines at the 2026 Summer Youth Olympics =

- Flag of Saint Vincent and the Grenadines
- IOC code: VIN
- NOC: The St. Vincent and the Grenadines National Olympic Committee

in Dakar, Senegal October 31, 2026 – November 13, 2026
- Competitors: 3 in 2 sports
- Flag bearers: Eltonique Leonard & Hazen Dabriel
- Medals: Gold 0 Silver 0 Bronze 0 Total 0

Summer Youth Olympics appearances
- 2010; 2014; 2018; 2026

Saint Vincent and the Grenadines is scheduled to compete at the 2026 Summer Youth Olympics in Dakar, Senegal from October 31 to November 13, 2026. This will mark Saint Vincent and the Grenadines's fourth appearance at the Youth Olympics, after making its debut in 2010.

Swimmers Eltonique Leonard and Hazen Dabriel served as the flag bearers for the opening ceremony.

== Competitors ==
The following is the list of number of competitors participating at the Games per sport/discipline.

Sport	Men	Women	Total
Athletics	1	0	1
Swimming	1	1	2
Total	2	1	3

== Athletics ==
Saint Vincent and the Grenadines entered one male athlete.

=== Track & road events ===
Men

Athlete	Event	Heat		Semifinal		Final	
Athlete	Event	Result	Rank	Result	Rank	Result	Rank
Tyrese Hackshaw	400 m						

== Swimming ==
Saint Vincent and the Grenadines entered two swimmers, one male and one female.

Athlete	Event	Heat		Semifinal		Final	
Athlete	Event	Time	Rank	Time	Rank	Time	Rank
Hazen Dabriel	50 m freestyle						
Hazen Dabriel	100 m freestyle	55.14	38	N/A	N/A	did not advance	did not advance
Hazen Dabriel	100 m backstroke						
Hazen Dabriel	200 m backstroke	2:21.88	10	N/A	N/A	did not advance	did not advance
Eltonique Leonard	50 m freestyle						
Eltonique Leonard	100 m freestyle	1:05.15	54	N/A	N/A	did not advance	did not advance
Eltonique Leonard	50 m backstroke						
Eltonique Leonard	100 m backstroke						
