= Mozambique at the 2026 Summer Youth Olympics =

- Flag of Mozambique
- IOC code: MOZ
- NOC: Comité Olímpico Nacional de Moçambique

in Dakar, Senegal October 31, 2026 – November 13, 2026
- Competitors: 7 in 5 sports
- Flag bearers: Angela Chicumbe & Lazaro Menete
- Medals: Gold 0 Silver 0 Bronze 0 Total 0

Summer Youth Olympics appearances
- 2010; 2014; 2018; 2026

Mozambique competed at the 2026 Summer Youth Olympics in Dakar, Senegal from October 31 to November 13, 2026. This marked Mozambique's fourth appearance at the Youth Olympics, after making its debut in 2010.

Swimmers Angela Chicumbe and Lazaro Menete served as the flag bearers for the opening ceremony.

== Competitors ==
The following is the list of number of competitors participating at the Games per sport/discipline.

Sport	Men	Women	Total
Athletics	1	0	1
Beach volleyball	0	2	2
Judo	1	0	1
Swimming	1	1	2
Triathlon	1	0	1
Total	4	3	7

== Athletics ==
Mozambique entered one male athlete.

=== Track & road events ===
Men

Athlete	Event	Semifinal		Final	
Athlete	Event	Result	Rank	Result	Rank
France Reoda	100 m				

== Beach volleyball ==
Mozambique received a quota place for the women's tournament.

Summary

Team	Event	Group stage				Round of 16	Quarterfinals	Semifinals	Final / BM	
Team	Event	Opposition Result	Opposition Result	Opposition Result	Rank	Opposition Result	Opposition Result	Opposition Result	Opposition Result	Rank
Assucena Mabjaia; Celia Machava	Women's tournament									

== Judo ==
Mozambique entered one male judoka based on the available quotas assigned by the International Judo Federation.

Men

Athlete	Event	Round of 16	Quarterfinals	Semifinals	Repechage 1	Repechage 2	Final	
Athlete	Event	Opposition Result	Opposition Result	Opposition Result	Opposition Result	Opposition Result	Opposition Result	Rank
Bruno Pinto	–66 kg							

== Swimming ==
Mozambique entered two swimmers, one male and one female.

Athlete	Event	Heat		Final	
Athlete	Event	Time	Rank	Time	Rank
Lazaro Menete	50 m freestyle				
Lazaro Menete	100 m freestyle				
Lazaro Menete	50 m backstroke				
Angela Chicumbe	50 m freestyle				
Angela Chicumbe	100 m freestyle				
Angela Chicumbe	50 m butterfly				

== Triathlon ==
Mozambique entered one male athlete.

Athlete	Event	Time						Rank
Athlete	Event	Swim (750m)	Trans 1	Bike (20km)	Trans 2	Run (5km)	Total	Rank
Arvin Massih	Men's individual							
