= Taekwondo at the 2026 Summer Youth Olympics =

Boxing competitions

Taekwondo at the IV Summer Youth Olympic Games
- Venue: Complexe Iba Mar Diop
- Dates: 8–12 November
- No. of events: 11
- Competitors: 99 from 66 nations

Taekwondo at the 2026 Summer Youth Olympics was held from 8 to 12 November at the Complexe Iba Mar Diop in Dakar, Senegal.

== Qualification ==
=== Qualification summary ===
NOC	Men					Women					Mixed team	Total
NOC	-48 kg	-55 kg	-63 kg	-73 kg	+73 kg	-44 kg	-49 kg	-55 kg	-63 kg	+63 kg	Mixed team	Total
Afghanistan					X				X			2
Armenia		X										1
Australia							X					1
Azerbaijan				X		X						2
Belarus					X							1
Bolivia		X										1
Bosnia and Herzegovina					X							1
Brazil										X		1
Bulgaria					X							1
Cameroon	X											1
Central African Republic		X										1
China						X						1
Chinese Taipei		X				X						2
Croatia						X						1
Cyprus							X					1
Czech Republic				X						X		2
Democratic Republic of the Congo					X							1
Egypt	X											1
Equatorial Guinea						X						1
Eswatini								X				1
Ethiopia	X											1
Finland							X					1
France	X									X		2
Gabon					X			X				2
Georgia			X									1
Germany			X	X				X	X		X	4
Ghana										X		1
Greece										X		1
Guinea		X										1
Honduras	X									X		2
Hungary							X					1
Iran					X				X			2
Italy						X						1
Ivory Coast										X		1
Jordan			X	X				X	X		X	4
Kazakhstan										X		1
Kosovo						X						1
Latvia							X					1
Liberia		X										1
Libya			X	X								2
Mali						X						1
Mexico			X	X				X	X		X	4
Moldova	X											1
Morocco	X											1
Niger		X					X					2
Norway										X		1
Oman	X											1
Panama						X						1
Paraguay							X					1
Peru									X			1
Refugee Olympic Team							X					1
Republic of the Congo		X										1
Russia					X	X						2
Rwanda							X					1
Saudi Arabia			X	X				X	X		X	4
Senegal			X	X				X	X		X	4
Serbia										X		1
South Korea					X		X					2
Spain					X							1
Sri Lanka	X											1
Tunisia			X	X				X	X		X	4
Turkey			X	X				X	X		X	4
United States								X				1
Uruguay			X									1
Uzbekistan		X										1
Vietnam		X										1

== Medal summary ==
=== Medal table ===
* Host nation (Senegal)

Rank	Nation	Gold	Silver	Bronze	Total
1	Jordan	3	0	0	3
2	Iran	1	1	0	2
3	Senegal*	1	0	2	3
4	Chinese Taipei	1	0	1	2
4	Germany	1	0	1	2
4	South Korea	1	0	1	2
7	Croatia	1	0	0	1
7	Egypt	1	0	0	1
7	Serbia	1	0	0	1
10	Mexico	0	1	3	4
11	Turkey	0	1	2	3
12	France	0	1	1	2
12	Russia	0	1	1	2
14	Australia	0	1	0	1
14	Azerbaijan	0	1	0	1
14	Czech Republic	0	1	0	1
14	Spain	0	1	0	1
14	Tunisia	0	1	0	1
14	Uzbekistan	0	1	0	1
20	Niger	0	0	2	2
21	Bolivia	0	0	1	1
21	Cyprus	0	0	1	1
21	Italy	0	0	1	1
21	Kazakhstan	0	0	1	1
21	Moldova	0	0	1	1
21	Morocco	0	0	1	1
21	United States	0	0	1	1
Totals (27 entries)		11	11	21	43

=== Men's events ===
Event	Gold	Silver	Bronze
48 kg	Youssef Hassan Kamal; Egypt	Maxence Botta; France	Abdellatif Ladimat; Morocco
48 kg	Youssef Hassan Kamal; Egypt	Maxence Botta; France	Dmitrii Balagula; Moldova
55 kg	Cheng Po-yu; Chinese Taipei	Asadbek Samandarov; Uzbekistan	Alejandro Tordoya; Bolivia
55 kg	Cheng Po-yu; Chinese Taipei	Asadbek Samandarov; Uzbekistan	Abdoul Aziz Issifi Mamoudou; Niger
63 kg	Abdallah Al-Zawahra; Jordan	Guillermo Cortés; Mexico	Nikolai Sparre; Germany
63 kg	Abdallah Al-Zawahra; Jordan	Guillermo Cortés; Mexico	İbrahim Efe Düzel; Turkey
73 kg	Ahmad Al-Dahamsheh; Jordan	Adil Kazimli; Azerbaijan	Jorge Martínez; Mexico
73 kg	Ahmad Al-Dahamsheh; Jordan	Adil Kazimli; Azerbaijan	Ameth Diop; Senegal
+73 kg	Benyamin Soltanian; Iran	Iván Lysenko; Spain	Jang Jun-won; South Korea
+73 kg	Benyamin Soltanian; Iran	Iván Lysenko; Spain	Bashir Adzhiev; Russia

=== Women's events ===
Event	Gold	Silver	Bronze
44 kg	Petra Uglešić; Croatia	Elina Tkhamokova; Russia	Virginia Lampis; Italy
44 kg	Petra Uglešić; Croatia	Elina Tkhamokova; Russia	Lai Yi-jhen; Chinese Taipei
49 kg	Lee Si-woo; South Korea	Mackenzie Macdonald; Australia	Ioanna Konstantinou; Cyprus
49 kg	Lee Si-woo; South Korea	Mackenzie Macdonald; Australia	Housseina Zada Mamoudou; Niger
55 kg	Marie Sarr; Senegal	Yasmine Haouani; Tunisia	Aline Herrera; Mexico
55 kg	Marie Sarr; Senegal	Yasmine Haouani; Tunisia	Karlee Vogel; United States
63 kg	Luna Fellinger; Germany	Asal Goltapeh; Iran	Aïda Touré; Senegal
63 kg	Luna Fellinger; Germany	Asal Goltapeh; Iran	Ayşe Işık; Turkey
+63 kg	Ema Zećirović; Serbia	Alice Bínová; Czech Republic	Meriem Benyoub; France
+63 kg	Ema Zećirović; Serbia	Alice Bínová; Czech Republic	Lyubov Yun; Kazakhstan

=== Mixed events ===
Event	Gold	Silver	Bronze
Mixed team	Jordan; Ahmad Al-Dahamsheh; Laean Al-Rawashdeh; Abdallah Al-Zawahra; Zainab Busila	Turkey; İbrahim Efe Düzel; Ercan Berk İmamoğlu; Ayşe Işık; Cansu Şeyhoğlu	Mexico; Guillermo Cortés; Aline Herrera; Jorge Martínez; Vania Mondragón
