= Judo at the 2026 Summer Youth Olympics =

Judo competitions

Judo Judo at the 2026 Summer Youth Olympics
- Venue: Dakar Expo Centre
- Location: Diamniadio, Senegal
- Dates: 1–3 November 2026
- No. of events: 8 (4 men's, 4 women's)
- Competitors: 94 from 93 nations

Competition at external databases
- Links: IJF • JudoInside

Judo at the 2026 Summer Youth Olympics was held from 1 to 3 November 2026. The venue was the Dakar Expo Centre in Diamniadio, Senegal. There were eight individual events, four for men and four for women. A total of 94 judoka from 93 nations took part.

Eight nations won one gold medal each. Host nation Senegal won one bronze medal.

== Venue and format ==
The judo competition took place at the Dakar Expo Centre. There were four weight categories for men and four for women. Each category had 12 places.

== Qualification ==
The International Judo Federation (IJF) published the list of selected athletes in October 2026. Senegal, the host nation, was the only nation with two athletes. In total, 94 judoka from 93 nations competed.

Men's				Women's			
-55 kg	-66 kg	-81 kg	-100 kg	-44 kg	-52 kg	-63 kg	-78 kg
Afghanistan	Argentina	Bulgaria	Angola	Belarus	Barbados	Algeria	Australia
Azerbaijan	Canada	Cyprus	Burundi	Botswana	Belgium	Germany	Austria
Bhutan	Cape Verde	Egypt	Chinese Taipei	Djibouti	Cameroon	Ghana	China
Central African Republic	France	Georgia	Gabon	Dominican Republic	Costa Rica	Guinea	Brazil
Croatia	Hungary	Iran	Japan	Greece	The Gambia	India	Republic of the Congo
Libya	Israel	Kuwait	Lithuania	Italy	Kazakhstan	Indonesia	Cuba
Mali	Jamaica	Mauritius	Madagascar	Jordan	Kenya	Kyrgyzstan	Kosovo
Mongolia	Mozambique	Qatar	Nepal	Mauritania	Moldova	Lebanon	Mexico
Refugee Olympic Team	Peru	Sierra Leone	Serbia	Poland	Niger	Malawi	Nicaragua
Saudi Arabia	São Tomé and Príncipe	Slovenia	Tajikistan	Senegal	Panama	Morocco	Puerto Rico
Tanzania	Senegal	South Africa	Thailand	Turkey	Portugal	South Korea	Russia
Zambia	Ukraine	United Arab Emirates	Uzbekistan	Venezuela	Slovakia	Tunisia	Zimbabwe

== Medal summary ==
Eight nations won one gold medal each. Host nation Senegal won one bronze medal, through Matar Diop in the men's 66 kg.

=== Medal table ===
* Host nation (Senegal)

Rank	Nation	Gold	Silver	Bronze	Total
1	Azerbaijan	1	0	0	1
1	Brazil	1	0	0	1
1	Germany	1	0	0	1
1	Kazakhstan	1	0	0	1
1	Lithuania	1	0	0	1
1	Slovenia	1	0	0	1
1	Turkey	1	0	0	1
1	Ukraine	1	0	0	1
9	Canada	0	1	0	1
9	Croatia	0	1	0	1
9	India	0	1	0	1
9	Iran	0	1	0	1
9	Jordan	0	1	0	1
9	Portugal	0	1	0	1
9	Russia	0	1	0	1
9	Uzbekistan	0	1	0	1
17	Argentina	0	0	1	1
17	Austria	0	0	1	1
17	Bulgaria	0	0	1	1
17	Burundi	0	0	1	1
17	China	0	0	1	1
17	Egypt	0	0	1	1
17	Indonesia	0	0	1	1
17	Italy	0	0	1	1
17	Japan	0	0	1	1
17	Kyrgyzstan	0	0	1	1
17	Moldova	0	0	1	1
17	Mongolia	0	0	1	1
17	Senegal*	0	0	1	1
17	Slovakia	0	0	1	1
17	Venezuela	0	0	1	1
17	Zambia	0	0	1	1
Totals (32 entries)		8	8	16	32

=== Medallists ===
==== Men's events ====
Event	Gold	Silver	Bronze
55 kg	Ibrahim Talibov; Azerbaijan	Jona Žvorc; Croatia	Tungalagiin Tögskhüslen; Mongolia
55 kg	Ibrahim Talibov; Azerbaijan	Jona Žvorc; Croatia	Elisha Zimba; Zambia
66 kg	Khazar Heydarov; Ukraine	Anes Mati; Canada	Thiago Carvallo; Argentina
66 kg	Khazar Heydarov; Ukraine	Anes Mati; Canada	Matar Diop; Senegal
81 kg	Maks Čebulj; Slovenia	Sobhan Hakimi; Iran	Ivan Nikolchev; Bulgaria
81 kg	Maks Čebulj; Slovenia	Sobhan Hakimi; Iran	Aly El-Ramly; Egypt
100 kg	Tajus Babaičenko; Lithuania	Jurabek Eshpulatov; Uzbekistan	Naito Arai; Japan
100 kg	Tajus Babaičenko; Lithuania	Jurabek Eshpulatov; Uzbekistan	Don de Dieu Igiraneza; Burundi

==== Women's events ====
Event	Gold	Silver	Bronze
44 kg	Sema Nur Yüksel; Turkey	Houda Wshah; Jordan	Rosalvick Aguilar; Venezuela
44 kg	Sema Nur Yüksel; Turkey	Houda Wshah; Jordan	Sara Coni; Italy
52 kg	Fatima Supygaliyeva; Kazakhstan	Sofia Gaspar; Portugal	Alexandra Chiron; Moldova
52 kg	Fatima Supygaliyeva; Kazakhstan	Sofia Gaspar; Portugal	Vivien Vadovičová; Slovakia
63 kg	Jolina Reinhold; Germany	Khushbu Darjada; India	Sashenka Fatimah; Indonesia
63 kg	Jolina Reinhold; Germany	Khushbu Darjada; India	Aaisha Kyialbekova; Kyrgyzstan
78 kg	Clarisse Vallim; Brazil	Anastasiia Dobrovolskaia; Russia	Cheng Yue; China
78 kg	Clarisse Vallim; Brazil	Anastasiia Dobrovolskaia; Russia	Selina Wögerer; Austria
