= Panama at the 2026 Summer Youth Olympics =

- Flag of Panama
- IOC code: PAN
- NOC: Panama Olympic Committee

in Dakar, Senegal October 31, 2026 – November 13, 2026
- Competitors: 18 in 8 sports
- Flag bearers: Lia Córdoba & Raúl Antadillas
- Medals: Gold 0 Silver 0 Bronze 0 Total 0

Summer Youth Olympics appearances
- 2010; 2014; 2018; 2026

Panama is scheduled to compete at the 2026 Summer Youth Olympics in Dakar, Senegal from October 31 to November 13, 2026. This will mark Panama's fourth appearance at the Youth Olympics, after making its debut in 2010.

Boxer Lia Córdoba and swimmer Raúl Antadillas served as the flag bearers for the opening ceremony.

== Competitors ==
The following is the list of number of competitors participating at the Games per sport/discipline.

| Sport | Men | Women | Total |
|---|---|---|---|
| Artistic gymnastics | 0 | 1 | 1 |
| Athletics | 1 | 0 | 1 |
| Boxing | 0 | 1 | 1 |
| Fencing | 1 | 0 | 1 |
| Futsal | 10 | 0 | 10 |
| Judo | 0 | 1 | 1 |
| Swimming | 1 | 1 | 2 |
| Taekwondo | 0 | 1 | 1 |
| Total | 13 | 5 | 18 |

== Artistic gymnastics ==
Panama entered one female gymnast.

Girls

| Athlete | Event | Qualification | | | | | | Final | | | | | |
| Athlete | Event | Apparatus | | | | Total | Rank | Apparatus | | | | Total | Rank |
| Athlete | Event | V | UB | BB | F | Total | Rank | V | UB | BB | F | Total | Rank |
|---|---|---|---|---|---|---|---|---|---|---|---|---|---|
| Aylin Goon | All-around | 11.600 | 7.233 | 11.766 | 10.666 | 41.265 | 44 | did not qualify | | | | | |

== Athletics ==
Panama entered one male athlete.

=== Track & road events ===
Men

| Athlete | Event | Semifinal | | Final | |
| Athlete | Event | Result | Rank | Result | Rank |
|---|---|---|---|---|---|
| Franklin Rodríguez | 100 m | DNF | | Did not advance | |

== Boxing ==
Panama entered one female athlete in the -51 kg category.

Women

| Athlete | Weight | Round of 16 | Quarterfinals | Semifinals | Final / BM | |
| Athlete | Weight | Opposition Result | Opposition Result | Opposition Result | Opposition Result | Rank |
|---|---|---|---|---|---|---|
| Lia Córdoba | -51 kg | | | | | |

== Fencing ==
Panama entered one male athlete.

| Athlete | Event | Round of 64 | Round of 32 | Round of 16 | Quarterfinal | Semifinal | Final / BM | |
| Athlete | Event | Opposition Score | Opposition Score | Opposition Score | Opposition Score | Opposition Score | Opposition Score | Rank |
|---|---|---|---|---|---|---|---|---|
| Caleb Caldito | Men's epée | | | | | | | |

== Futsal ==
Panama entered a team for the men's tournament.

Summary

| Event | Group stage | | | | Semifinal | Final / BM | |
| Event | Opposition Score | Opposition Score | Opposition Score | Group Rank | Opposition Score | Opposition Score | Rank |
|---|---|---|---|---|---|---|---|
| Men's tournament | Senegal | Afghanistan | Argentina | | | | |

Roster

- José Almoguea
- Josué Als
- George Campbell
- Víctor Carrasco
- Eliecer Díaz
- Jonathan Mendoza
- Michael Mosquera
- Duan Ramírez
- Joel Saravia
- Jahzeel Tenorio

== Judo ==
Panama entered one female judoka based on the available quotas assigned by the International Judo Federation.

Women

| Athlete | Event | Round of 16 | Quarterfinals | Semifinals | Repechage | Final / BM | |
| Athlete | Event | Opposition Result | Opposition Result | Opposition Result | Opposition Result | Opposition Result | Rank |
|---|---|---|---|---|---|---|---|
| Julieta Escobar | -52 kg | | | | | | |

== Swimming ==
Panama entered two swimmers, one male and one female.

| Athlete | Event | Heat | | Semifinal | | Final | |
| Athlete | Event | Time | Rank | Time | Rank | Time | Rank |
|---|---|---|---|---|---|---|---|
| Raúl Antadillas | 50 m breaskstroke | | | | | | |
| Raúl Antadillas | 100 m breaskstroke | | | | | | |
| Raúl Antadillas | 200 m individual medley | | | | | | |
| Karla Carrizo | 50 m freestyle | | | | | | |
| Karla Carrizo | 50 m backstroke | | | | | | |
| Karla Carrizo | 100 m backstroke | | | | | | |

== Taekwondo ==
Panama entered one female athlete.

Women

| Athlete | Event | Round of 16 | Quarterfinals | Semifinals | Repechage | Final / BM | |
| Athlete | Event | Opposition Result | Opposition Result | Opposition Result | Opposition Result | Opposition Result | Rank |
|---|---|---|---|---|---|---|---|
| Natalia Pérez | -44 kg | | | | | | |
