= Croatia at the 2026 Summer Youth Olympics =

- Flag of Croatia
- IOC code: CRO
- NOC: Croatian Olympic Committee
- Website: www.hoo.hr

in Dakar, Senegal October 31, 2026 – November 13, 2026
- Competitors: 19 in 8 sports
- Flag bearers (opening): Ana Bobanović, Jona Žvorc
- Flag bearers (closing): Nola Lucarić, Noa Anić
- Medals Ranked 10th: Gold 3 Silver 4 Bronze 0 Total 7

Summer Youth Olympics appearances (overview)
- 2010; 2014; 2018; 2026

Croatia competed at the 2026 Summer Youth Olympics in Dakar, Senegal from October 31 to November 13, 2026, with 19 athletes in 8 sports. This is Croatia's fourth appearance at the Summer Youth Olympics, after making its debut in 2010. Croatian athletes won seven medals, three gold and four silver, making it the most successful appearances up to date.

Most of the participants are women's beach handball team members (10), with two participants each in athletics and swimming, and one each in beach wrestling, sailing, judo, archery and taekwondo.

Flagbearers at the opening ceremony were swimmer Ana Bobanović and judoka Jona Žvorc, while on the closing ceremony those were beach handballer Nola Lucarić and sailor Noa Anić.

== Medals ==
Medals won
Medal	Athlete	Sport	Event	Date
Gold	Ana Bobanović	Swimming	Girls' 100m freestyle	2 November
Gold	Ana Bobanović	Swimming	Girls' 50m freestyle	4 November
Gold	Petra Uglešić	Taekwondo	Girls' 44 kg	8 November
Silver	Jona Žvorc	Judo	Boys' 55kg	1 November
Silver	Ana Bobanović	Swimming	Girls' 50m butterfly	4 November
Silver	Ana Bobanović	Swimming	Girls' 200m freestyle	6 November
Silver	Zara Veltruski	Athletics	Girls' shot put	10 November

Close to winning medal were swimmer Jakov Wozdecky (4th place) and Girls' beach handball team (5th place).
