= Mali at the 2026 Summer Youth Olympics =

- Flag of Mali
- IOC code: MLI
- NOC: Comité National Olympique et Sportif du Mali

in Dakar, Senegal October 31, 2026 – November 13, 2026
- Competitors: 5 in 5 sports
- Flag bearers: Mariam Diallo & Younoussa Maiga
- Medals: Gold 0 Silver 0 Bronze 0 Total 0

Summer Youth Olympics appearances
- 2010; 2014; 2018; 2026

Mali is scheduled to compete at the 2026 Summer Youth Olympics in Dakar, Senegal from October 31 to November 13, 2026. This will mark Mali's fourth appearance at the Youth Olympics, after making its debut in 2010.

Taekwondo practitioner Mariam Diallo and swimmer Younoussa Maiga served as the flag bearers for the opening ceremony.

== Competitors ==
The following is the list of number of competitors participating at the Games per sport/discipline.

Sport	Men	Women	Total
Athletics	0	1	1
Fencing	1	0	1
Judo	1	0	1
Swimming	1	0	1
Taekwondo	0	1	1
Total	3	2	5

== Athletics ==
Mali entered one female athlete.

=== Track & road events ===
Women

Athlete	Event	Semifinal		Final	
Athlete	Event	Result	Rank	Result	Rank
Awa Diarra	800 m				

== Fencing ==
Mali entered one male athlete.

Men

Athlete	Event	Pool round		Round of 16	Quarterfinals	Semifinals	Final / BM	
Athlete	Event	Opposition Score	Seed	Opposition Score	Opposition Score	Opposition Score	Opposition Score	Rank
Thierno Thiam	Foil							

== Judo ==
Mali entered one male judoka based on the available quotas assigned by the International Judo Federation.

Men

Athlete	Event	Round of 16	Quarterfinals	Semifinals	Repechage 1	Repechage 2	Final	
Athlete	Event	Opposition Result	Opposition Result	Opposition Result	Opposition Result	Opposition Result	Opposition Result	Rank
Moussa Koita	–55 kg							

== Swimming ==
Mali entered one male swimmer.

Athlete	Event	Heat		Final	
Athlete	Event	Time	Rank	Time	Rank
Younoussa Maiga	50 m freestyle				
Younoussa Maiga	100 m freestyle				
Younoussa Maiga	50 m butterfly				

== Taekwondo ==
Mali entered one female athlete.

Women

Athlete	Event	Round of 16	Quarterfinals	Semifinals	Repechage	Final / BM	
Athlete	Event	Opposition Result	Opposition Result	Opposition Result	Opposition Result	Opposition Result	Rank
Mariam Diallo	-44 kg	Bye					
