= Tajikistan at the 2026 Summer Youth Olympics =

- Flag of Tajikistan
- IOC code: TJK
- NOC: National Olympic Committee of the Republic of Tajikistan
- Website: www.olympic.tj

in Dakar, Senegal October 31, 2026 – November 13, 2026
- Competitors: 6 in 4 sports
- Flag bearers: Sofiyakhon Gazieva & Asmar Sharif
- Medals: Gold 0 Silver 0 Bronze 0 Total 0

Summer Youth Olympics appearances
- 2010; 2014; 2018; 2026

Tajikistan is scheduled to compete at the 2026 Summer Youth Olympics in Dakar, Senegal from October 31 to November 13, 2026. This will mark Tajikistan's fourth appearance at the Youth Olympics, after making its debut in 2010.

Swimmer Sofiyakhon Gazieva and judoka Asmar Sharif served as the flag bearers for the opening ceremony.

== Competitors ==
The following is the list of number of competitors participating at the Games per sport/discipline.

| Sport | Men | Women | Total |
|---|---|---|---|
| Athletics | 1 | 1 | 2 |
| Boxing | 1 | 0 | 1 |
| Judo | 1 | 0 | 1 |
| Swimming | 1 | 1 | 2 |
| Total | 4 | 2 | 6 |

== Athletics ==
Tajikistan entered two athletes, one of each gender.

=== Track & road events ===
Women

| Athlete | Event | Heat | | Semifinal | | Final | |
| Athlete | Event | Result | Rank | Result | Rank | Result | Rank |
|---|---|---|---|---|---|---|---|
| Gandzhina Rakhmonova | 2000 m steeplechase | | | | | | |

=== Field events ===
Men

| Athlete | Event | Qualification | | Final | |
| Athlete | Event | Distance | Position | Distance | Position |
|---|---|---|---|---|---|
| Bunyodbek Khudoiqulov | Javelin throw | | | | |

== Boxing ==
Tajikistan entered one male athlete in the −65 kg category.

Men

| Athlete | Weight | Round of 16 | Quarterfinals | Semifinals | Final / BM | |
| Athlete | Weight | Opposition Result | Opposition Result | Opposition Result | Opposition Result | Rank |
|---|---|---|---|---|---|---|
| Akhmadshokh Khoshimov | –65 kg | | | | | |

== Judo ==
Tajikistan entered one male judoka based on the available quotas assigned by the International Judo Federation.

Men

| Athlete | Event | Round of 16 | Quarterfinals | Semifinals | Repechage | Final / BM | |
| Athlete | Event | Opposition Result | Opposition Result | Opposition Result | Opposition Result | Opposition Result | Rank |
|---|---|---|---|---|---|---|---|
| Asmar Sharif | –100 kg | | | | | | |

== Swimming ==
Tajikistan entered two swimmers, one male and one female.

| Athlete | Event | Heat | | Semifinal | | Final | |
| Athlete | Event | Time | Rank | Time | Rank | Time | Rank |
|---|---|---|---|---|---|---|---|
| Nekruz Shokirov | 50 m freestyle | | | | | | |
| Nekruz Shokirov | 50 m backstroke | | | | | | |
| Sofiyakhon Gazieva | 50 m freestyle | | | | | | |
| Sofiyakhon Gazieva | 100 m freestyle | 1:11.89 | 62 | N/A | N/A | did not advance | did not advance |
