= 2026 Summer Youth Olympics =

Multi-sport event in Dakar, Senegal

IV Summer Youth Olympic Games
- Location: Dakar, Senegal
- Motto: Africa Welcomes, Dakar Celebrates (French: L'Afrique Accueille, Dakar Célèbre) (Wolof: Afrig Dalal, Ndakaaru Jëmël)
- Nations: 205 (including the EOR team)
- Athletes: 2,654
- Events: 151 in 25 sports
- Opening: 31 October 2026
- Closing: 13 November 2026
- Opened by: President Bassirou Diomaye Faye
- Closed by: IOC president Kirsty Coventry
- Cauldron: Abdourahmane Marième Sy; Aïcha Diop
- Stadium: Abdoulaye Wade Stadium (opening); Youth Olympic Village Stage (closing)

The 2026 Summer Youth Olympics (French: Jeux Olympiques de la jeunesse d'été de 2026), officially known as the IV Summer Youth Olympic Games and commonly known as Dakar 2026 (Wolof: Ndakaaru 2026), was the fourth edition of the Summer Youth Olympics, an international sports, education and cultural festival for teenagers, in a city designated by the International Olympic Committee (IOC). Originally scheduled to be held for 18 days in Dakar, Senegal, from 22 October to 9 November 2022, it is now scheduled to be held there for 14 days—from 31 October to 13 November 2026, becoming the first IOC event to be held in Africa and the first Youth Olympic Games under the IOC presidency of Kirsty Coventry.

On 9 December 2014 at the 127th IOC Session it was decided to move the organisation of the Youth Olympic Games to a non-Olympic year, starting with the fourth Summer Youth Olympic Games, to be postponed from 2022 to 2023. Subsequently, the IOC reverted to a 2022 date, and announced in February 2018 that they would be recommending that the event be held in Africa. The 132nd IOC Session confirmed the change of date back to 2022 on 7 February 2018. The host was announced at the 133rd IOC Session in Buenos Aires, Argentina during the 2018 edition.

== Bidding process ==
Originally scheduled for 2022, the International Olympic Committee decided at its 127th session in Monaco to postpone the organization of the future YOG to a non-Olympic year, namely 2023. However, in June 2020 the IOC Executive Board ultimately decided to move the YOG back to 2026.

The IOC voted to select the host city of the 2022 Summer Youth Olympics on 8 October 2018 at the 133rd IOC Session in Buenos Aires, Argentina.

2022/2026 Youth Olympic Games bidding results
City	Nation	Votes
Dakar	Senegal	Unanimous

== Development and preparations ==
=== Organisation ===
On 15 July 2020, the IOC and Senegalese government mutually agreed to postpone the Games to 2026 due to the operational and economic consequences of the postponement of the 2020 Summer Olympics to July 2021 due to the COVID-19 pandemic.

During the 141st IOC Session, the committee provided an update, including a detailed schedule for the required upgrades, which are scheduled to begin in the first quarter of 2024. Infrastructure preparations for the Games remained on track, with refurbishment work launching at key urban venues in Dakar and construction progressing at the equestrian centre and the Youth Olympic Village in Diamniadio. The completed venue master plan includes seven venues across the three host zones that will accommodate competition sites.

=== Venues and infrastructure ===
Senegal proposes to organize the 2026 Summer Youth Olympics in three distinct areas, Dakar, Diamniadio and Saly.

==== Dakar ====
Venue		Events	Capacity	Status
Complexe Iba Mar Diop	Stadium	Athletics	8,000	Existing, renovated
Complexe Iba Mar Diop	Stadium	Rugby sevens	8,000	Existing, renovated
Complexe Iba Mar Diop	Gymnasium	Futsal (preliminaries)	TBA	New
Complexe Iba Mar Diop	Gymnasium	Taekwondo	TBA	New
Tour de l'Oeuf Complex	Outdoor court	3x3 basketball	8,000 (overall)	Temporary
Tour de l'Oeuf Complex	Outdoor court	Baseball5	8,000 (overall)	Temporary
Tour de l'Oeuf Complex	Outdoor court	Breaking	8,000 (overall)	Temporary
Tour de l'Oeuf Complex	Skatepark	Skateboarding	8,000 (overall)	New
Tour de l'Oeuf Complex	Pool	Swimming	8,000 (overall)	Existing, renovated
West Corniche		Road cycling	—N/a	Temporary

==== Diamniadio ====
Venue		Events	Capacity	Status
Diamniadio Equestrian Centre		Equestrian	1,440	New
Dakar Arena		Badminton	15,000	Existing
Dakar Arena		Futsal (finals)	15,000	Existing
Abdoulaye Wade Stadium		Opening ceremony	50,000	Existing
Abdoulaye Wade Stadium		Archery	50,000	Existing
Dakar Expo Centre	Pavillion A	Fencing	10,000 (overall)	Existing with temporary stands
Dakar Expo Centre	Pavillion A	Table tennis	10,000 (overall)	Existing with temporary stands
Dakar Expo Centre	Pavillion C	Boxing	10,000 (overall)	Existing with temporary stands
Dakar Expo Centre	Pavillion C	Wushu	10,000 (overall)	Existing with temporary stands
Dakar Expo Centre	Pavillion E	Artistic gymnastics	10,000 (overall)	Existing with temporary stands
Dakar Expo Centre	Pavillion E	Judo	10,000 (overall)	Existing with temporary stands
Youth Olympic Village Stage		Closing ceremony	—N/a	Temporary

==== Saly ====
Venue		Events	Capacity	Status
Saly Beach West	Beach courts	Beach handball	3,000 (overall)	Temporary
Saly Beach West	Beach courts	Beach volleyball	3,000 (overall)	Temporary
Saly Beach West	Beach courts	Beach wrestling	3,000 (overall)	Temporary
Saly Beach West	Water park	Rowing	3,000 (overall)	Temporary
Saly Beach West	Water park	Sailing	3,000 (overall)	Temporary
Saly Beach West	Water park	Triathlon	3,000 (overall)	Temporary

== The Games ==
=== Sports ===
The 2026 Summer Youth Olympics will feature 151 events in 25 sports. Breaking, skateboarding will join the 21 core sports. There will be no mixed team events (NOCs) for the first time, 7 open event (equestrian), 72 men's events, and 72 women's events. Baseball5 and wushu were subsequently added as optional sports.

In June 2024, the IOC Executive Board approved a new sports program proposed by the IOC’s Olympic Programme Commission to better fit it into the local context. An amendment to the program kept 25 of the original 35 sports in the competition program and moved 10 sports to the engagement program. The change also limits each sport to one discipline only, reducing the overall number of athletes while ensuring gender parity. The events and athlete quotas were confirmed on 3 December 2024.

==== Entries ====
For the first time, all participation registrations are being managed directly by the IOC, in close cooperation with the National Olympic Committees (NOCs) and the respective sports federations. The IOC published a document outlining this process on 17 March 2025. These participation principles are based on six pillars:

- Universality – All NOCs and the Refugee Olympic Team are ensured to have the opportunity to participate in the Games with at least one male and one female athlete.
- Continental Representation – There may be no more than one quota place per NOC and sport.
- Strong African Representation – The participation of all 54 African NOCs is prioritized by the IOC; wherever possible, African countries are to participate in the Games with at least two male and two female athletes.
- Host Representation – The host nation, Senegal, is set to be represented in all sports and disciplines, wherever possible.
- Athlete Performance – There are no direct international qualification tournaments for the Youth Games.
- Gender Parity – The IOC will ensure that an equal number of quota places are allocated to men and women.

The definition of the actual qualification criteria remains the responsibility of the respective sports federations; this may include participation in, and results from, national, continental, and/or international events.

==== Competition program ====
- 3x3 basketball (2)
- Archery (3)
- Artistic gymnastics (5)
- Athletics (36)
- Badminton (2)
- Baseball5 (1)
- Beach handball (2)
- Beach volleyball (2)
- Beach wrestling (8)
- Boxing (10)
- Breaking (2)
- Coastal rowing (3)
- Equestrian (1)
- Fencing (6)
- Futsal (2)
- Judo (8)
- Road cycling (4)
- Rugby sevens (2)
- Sailing (2)
- Skateboarding (2)
- Swimming (28)
- Table tennis (3)
- Taekwondo (11)
- Triathlon (2)
- Wushu (4)

==== Engagement program ====
Sports in the engagement program were selected to build interest and participation in the host city through demonstrations offered to the general public. They took place at the Place du Souvenir Africain.

- Canoeing
- Golf
- Hockey5s
- Karate
- Modern pentathlon
- Shooting
- Sport climbing
- Surfing
- Tennis
- Weightlifting

=== Participating National Olympic Committees ===
- A total of 204 countries sent at least one athlete to compete in the Games. In addition, a refugee team partook for the first time in the Youth Olympic Games.
- North Korea and Turkmenistan, who entered athletes in the previous Games, did not participate.

Participating National Olympic Committees
- Afghanistan (13)
- Albania (1)
- Algeria (41)
- American Samoa (2)
- Andorra (1)
- Angola (9)
- Antigua and Barbuda (5)
- Argentina (42)
- Armenia (5)
- Aruba (3)
- Australia (41)
- Austria (18)
- Azerbaijan (13)
- Bahamas (5)
- Bahrain (4)
- Bangladesh (4)
- Barbados (3)
- Belarus (7)
- Belgium (12)
- Belize (2)
- Benin (7)
- Bermuda (4)
- Bhutan (3)
- Bolivia (7)
- Bosnia and Herzegovina (1)
- Botswana (6)
- Brazil (35)
- British Virgin Islands (1)
- Brunei (3)
- Bulgaria (17)
- Burkina Faso (6)
- Burundi (4)
- Cambodia (4)
- Cameroon (18)
- Canada (28)
- Cape Verde (8)
- Cayman Islands (4)
- Central African Republic (3)
- Chad (2)
- Chile (18)
- China (66)
- Chinese Taipei (37)
- Colombia (22)
- Comoros (3)
- Cook Islands (12)
- Costa Rica (19)
- Croatia (19)
- Cuba (12)
- Cyprus (8)
- Czech Republic (35)
- Democratic Republic of the Congo (8)
- Denmark (8)
- Djibouti (4)
- Dominica (2)
- Dominican Republic (11)
- Ecuador (15)
- Egypt (44)
- El Salvador (6)
- Equatorial Guinea (3)
- Eritrea (5)
- Estonia (12)
- Eswatini (3)
- Ethiopia (18)
- Federated States of Micronesia (1)
- Fiji (20)
- Finland (4)
- France (69)
- Gabon (7)
- Georgia (13)
- Germany (50)
- Ghana (13)
- Great Britain (15)
- Greece (18)
- Grenada (3)
- Guam (5)
- Guatemala (10)
- Guinea (10)
- Guinea-Bissau (4)
- Guyana (2)
- Haiti (2)
- Honduras (10)
- Hong Kong (15)
- Hungary (28)
- Iceland (3)
- India (17)
- Indonesia (12)
- Iran (29)
- Iraq (5)
- Ireland (3)
- Israel (11)
- Italy (46)
- Ivory Coast (12)
- Jamaica (11)
- Japan (45)
- Jordan (13)
- Kazakhstan (18)
- Kenya (52)
- Kiribati (2)
- Kosovo (3)
- Kuwait (6)
- Kyrgyzstan (5)
- Laos (3)
- Latvia (18)
- Lebanon (3)
- Lesotho (2)
- Liberia (2)
- Libya (8)
- Liechtenstein (1)
- Lithuania (14)
- Luxembourg (3)
- Madagascar (18)
- Malawi (4)
- Malaysia (12)
- Maldives (2)
- Mali (5)
- Malta (5)
- Marshall Islands (1)
- Mauritania (3)
- Mauritius (10)
- Mexico (62)
- Moldova (9)
- Monaco (2)
- Mongolia (10)
- Montenegro (3)
- Morocco (39)
- Mozambique (7)
- Myanmar (2)
- Namibia (12)
- Nauru (3)
- Nepal (4)
- Netherlands (6)
- New Zealand (18)
- Nicaragua (5)
- Niger (6)
- Nigeria (19)
- North Macedonia (3)
- Norway (6)
- Oman (3)
- Pakistan (3)
- Palau (6)
- Palestine (2)
- Panama (18)
- Papua New Guinea (2)
- Paraguay (19)
- Peru (15)
- Philippines (9)
- Poland (24)
- Portugal (25)
- Puerto Rico (30)
- Qatar (4)
- Refugee Olympic Team (6)
- Republic of the Congo (4)
- Romania (16)
- Russia (13)
- Rwanda (9)
- Saint Kitts and Nevis (1)
- Saint Lucia (3)
- Saint Vincent and the Grenadines (3)
- Samoa (5)
- San Marino (2)
- São Tomé and Príncipe (2)
- Saudi Arabia (14)
- Senegal (136) (host)
- Serbia (9)
- Seychelles (4)
- Sierra Leone (5)
- Singapore (14)
- Slovakia (13)
- Slovenia (12)
- Solomon Islands (17)
- Somalia (2)
- South Africa (46)
- South Korea (18)
- South Sudan (2)
- Spain (44)
- Sri Lanka (5)
- Sudan (2)
- Suriname (3)
- Sweden (6)
- Switzerland (12)
- Syria (10)
- Tajikistan (6)
- Tanzania (6)
- Thailand (28)
- The Gambia (7)
- Timor-Leste (3)
- Togo (4)
- Tonga (4)
- Trinidad and Tobago (4)
- Tunisia (42)
- Turkey (34)
- Tuvalu (2)
- Uganda (25)
- United Arab Emirates (13)
- United States (29)
- Ukraine (38)
- Uruguay (16)
- Uzbekistan (19)
- Vanuatu (3)
- Venezuela (34)
- Vietnam (10)
- Virgin Islands (4)
- Yemen (2)
- Zambia (6)
- Zimbabwe (12)

== Calendar ==
The schedule was released on 2 February 2026.

All times and dates use Greenwich Mean Time (UTC+0)

OC	Opening ceremony	●	Event competitions	●	Gold medal events	CC	Closing ceremony

October/November 2026	October		November													Events
October/November 2026	30th Fri	31st Sat	1st Sun	2nd Mon	3rd Tue	4th Wed	5th Thu	6th Fri	7th Sat	8th Sun	9th Mon	10th Tue	11th Wed	12th Thu	13th Fri	Events
Ceremonies		OC													CC	—N/a
3x3 basketball								●	●	●	2					2
Archery								●	●	1	1	1				3
Artistic gymnastics									●	●	2	2	1			5
Athletics										10	12	14				36
Badminton			●	●	●	●	2									2
Baseball5	●	●	●	●	1											1
Beach handball											●	●	●	●	2	2
Beach volleyball		●	●	●	●	2										2
Beach wrestling									4	4						8
Boxing									●	●	●	●	●	10		10
Breaking														●	2	2
Coastal rowing		●	●	1	2											3
Equestrian					●		●	1								1
Fencing										1	1	1	1	1	1	6
Futsal			●	●	●	●	●		●	●	●		1	1		2
Judo			3	3	2											8
Road cycling										2		2				4
Rugby sevens			●	1	1											2
Sailing										●	●	●	●	2		2
Skateboarding						1	1									2
Swimming			5	4	5	6	4	4								28
Table tennis		●	●	●	1	●	2									3
Taekwondo										2	2	3	3	1		11
Triathlon							1	1								2
Wushu			●	●	4											4
Daily medal events	0	0	8	9	16	9	10	6	4	20	20	23	6	15	5	151
Cumulative total	0	0	8	17	33	42	52	58	62	82	102	125	131	146	151	151
October/November 2026	October		November													Events
October/November 2026	30th Fri	31st Sat	1st Sun	2nd Mon	3rd Tue	4th Wed	5th Thu	6th Fri	7th Sat	8th Sun	9th Mon	10th Tue	11th Wed	12th Thu	13th Fri	Events

== Medal table ==
* Host nation (Senegal)

Rank	Nation	Gold	Silver	Bronze	Total
1	China	18	8	7	33
2	Japan	11	8	9	28
3	Russia	8	4	2	14
4	Egypt	6	1	5	12
5	Ethiopia	5	3	0	8
6	Senegal*	5	0	7	12
7	France	4	5	4	13
8	Kenya	4	2	0	6
9	South Africa	3	5	3	11
10	Croatia	3	4	0	7
11–99	Remaining	85	110	144	339
Totals (99 entries)		152	150	181	483

Source: Dakar 2026

== Marketing ==
The organising committee has announced ambassadors for the Games, who include Omar Sy and Khaby Lame.

=== Mascot ===
Ayo
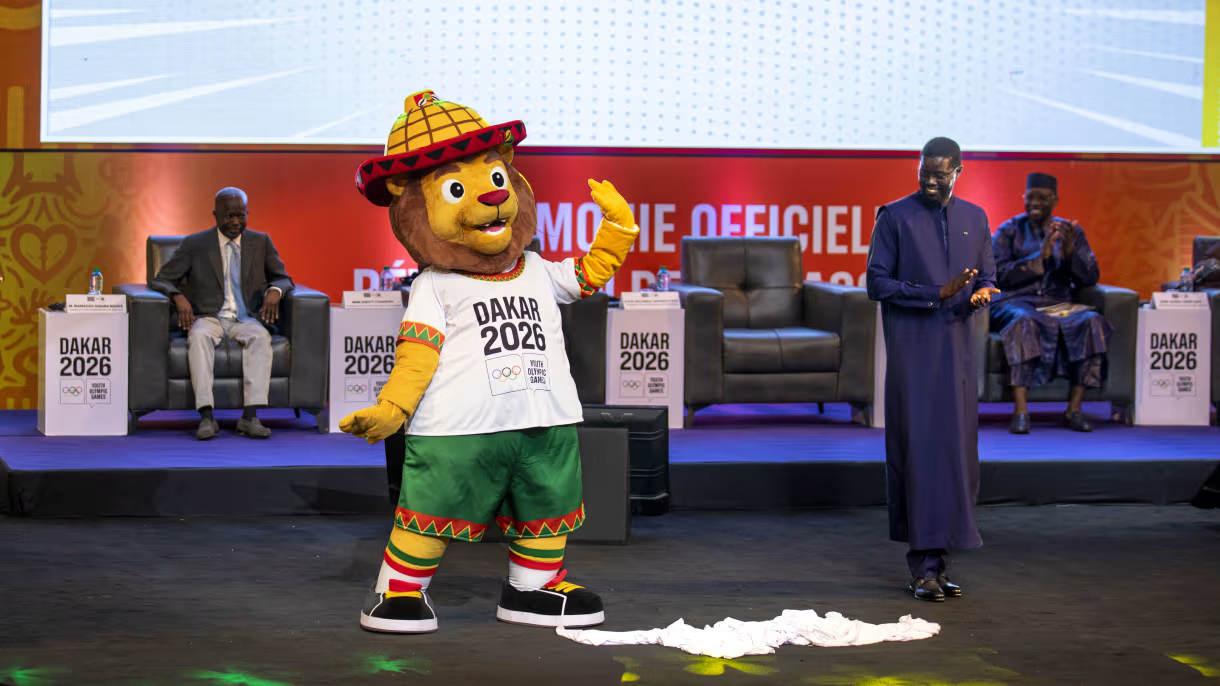

Mascot of the 2026 Summer Youth Olympics (Dakar)
- Creator: Ndeye Mariama Diop
- Significance: A young lion wearing a tingandé, a traditional hat worn by the Fula people

Ayo, the official mascot, was unveiled on 31 October 2025 at Grand Théâtre National de Dakar. His name means "joy" in Yoruba.

== Broadcasting rights ==
- Argentina – TyC Sports
- Brazil – Grupo Globo
- Chile – Chilevisión
- China - CMG
- France - France Télévisions
- South Korea – JTBC
- Thailand – Plan B
- United Kingdom - BBC
- Europe – Eurosport (Note: Free-to-air rights to be sold to local broadcasters, except Belarus and Russia) and European Broadcasting Union

Notes

Preceded by Buenos Aires	Summer Youth Olympic Games; Dakar; IV Youth Olympiad (2026)	Succeeded by TBA
