= Coastal rowing at the 2026 Summer Youth Olympics – Women's solo =

Women's coastal rowing at the 2026 Summer Youth Olympics

Women's solo at the 2026 Summer Youth Olympics
- Venue: Saly Beach West
- Dates: 31 October – 3 November 2026
- Competitors: 32 from 32 nations

Medalists
gold medal	Liu Lili	China
silver medal	Carolina Guerra Gonzalez	Germany
bronze medal	Blanca López Valera	Spain

The women's solo competition in coastal rowing at the 2026 Summer Youth Olympics was held from 31 October to 3 November 2026 at Saly Beach West in Saly, Senegal. The competition began with two time trials, followed by knockout races. The eight fastest athletes in the first time trial advanced directly to the last 16, while the remaining athletes competed in a second time trial for the remaining places.

== Results ==
=== Time trial 1 ===
The eight fastest athletes qualified directly for the last 16. These qualifiers are highlighted in green.

Rank	Athlete	Nationality	Time	Qualification
1	Tanya Brendle	Switzerland	2:57.82	Q
2	Liu Lili	China	2:57.89	Q
3	Blanca López Valera	Spain	2:58.31	Q
4	Marie Zavadilova	Czech Republic	3:02.40	Q
5	Camilla Griffin	Australia	3:02.58	Q
6	Lexi Gill	Great Britain	3:03.83	Q
7	Elif Özdemir	Turkey	3:04.72	Q
8	Carolina Guerra Gonzalez	Germany	3:06.29	Q
9	Alena Lux	Austria	3:08.15	
10	Elisa Guilloton	France	3:09.20	
11	Allison Grove	United States	3:10.14	
12	Alia Ali	Egypt	3:10.38	
13	Sarra Amari	Tunisia	3:11.04	
14	Giorgia Cassina	Italy	3:12.21	
15	Evgenia Maria Polycarpou	Cyprus	3:12.28	
16	Kate Dunne	Ireland	3:13.98	
17	Crina Adelina Neicu	Romania	3:15.04	
18	Saaga Hakala	Finland	3:15.15	
19	Viktoriia Radchenko	Ukraine	3:15.28	
20	Thatchaporn Phengsawang	Thailand	3:16.49	
21	Sofija Klujeva	Latvia	3:16.63	
22	Natalia Townsend	El Salvador	3:17.31	
23	Victoria Giménez	Paraguay	3:19.08	
24	Wai Hei Chen	Hong Kong	3:19.50	
25	Ghizlene Besma Bennacer	Algeria	3:19.83	
26	Maki Asakura	Japan	3:26.22	
27	Tupulua Vaouli	American Samoa	3:30.06	
28	Arianna Robinson	Zimbabwe	3:31.27	
29	Diadou Cissé	Senegal	3:42.32	
30	Elena Lara	Honduras	3:46.33	
31	Jenan Khaleefoh	Kuwait	4:00.04	
—	Frida Weber Lozano	Mexico	DNF	

=== Time trial 2 ===
Athletes who did not qualify directly in the first time trial competed in the second time trial. The eight fastest athletes qualified for the last 16. Qualifiers are highlighted in green.

Rank	Athlete	Nationality	Time	Qualification
1	Allison Grove	United States	2:57.88	Q
2	Alia Ali	Egypt	2:59.29	Q
3	Alena Lux	Austria	3:00.05	Q
4	Viktoriia Radchenko	Ukraine	3:00.46	Q
5	Saaga Hakala	Finland	3:01.69	Q
6	Thatchaporn Phengsawang	Thailand	3:01.92	Q
7	Elisa Guilloton	France	3:02.05	Q
8	Kate Dunne	Ireland	3:02.60	Q
9	Sarra Amari	Tunisia	3:02.67	
10	Wai Hei Chen	Hong Kong	3:03.12	
11	Giorgia Cassina	Italy	3:03.19	
12	Arianna Robinson	Zimbabwe	3:03.96	
13	Sofija Klujeva	Latvia	3:04.63	
14	Ghizlene Besma Bennacer	Algeria	3:05.70	
15	Victoria Giménez	Paraguay	3:06.47	
16	Maki Asakura	Japan	3:06.47	
17	Evgenia Maria Polycarpou	Cyprus	3:07.26	
18	Natalia Townsend	El Salvador	3:07.55	
19	Crina Adelina Neicu	Romania	3:07.60	
20	Tupulua Vaouli	American Samoa	3:13.34	
21	Frida Weber Lozano	Mexico	3:13.49	
22	Diadou Cissé	Senegal	3:21.86	
23	Elena Lara	Honduras	3:26.02	
24	Jenan Khaleefoh	Kuwait	3:45.02	

== Knockout stage ==
=== Last 16 ===
Match	Country	Athlete	Result	Progression
1	Switzerland	Tanya Brendle	2:49.51	Q
1	Ireland	Kate Dunne	2:56.57	ELM
2	China	Liu Lili	2:47.25	Q
2	France	Elisa Guilloton	3:35.25	ELM
3	Spain	Blanca López Valera	2:55.37	Q
3	Thailand	Thatchaporn Phengsawang	2:59.37	ELM
4	Czech Republic	Marie Zavadilova	2:46.52	Q
4	Finland	Saaga Hakala	2:54.50	ELM
5	Australia	Camilla Griffin	2:44.84	Q
5	Ukraine	Viktoriia Radchenko	2:59.47	ELM
6	Austria	Alena Lux	2:45.74	Q
6	Great Britain	Lexi Gill	2:56.38	ELM
7	Turkey	Elif Özdemir	2:43.95	Q
7	Egypt	Alia Ali	3:02.71	ELM
8	Germany	Carolina Guerra Gonzalez	2:48.11	Q
8	United States	Allison Grove	2:57.92	ELM

=== Quarterfinals ===
Match	Country	Athlete	Result	Progression
1	Germany	Carolina Guerra Gonzalez	2:43.95	Q
1	Switzerland	Tanya Brendle	2:49.82	ELM
2	Czech Republic	Marie Zavadilova	2:40.95	Q
2	Australia	Camilla Griffin	2:43.19	ELM
3	China	Liu Lili	2:46.05	Q
3	Turkey	Elif Özdemir	3:06.54	ELM
4	Spain	Blanca López Valera	2:48.40	Q
4	Austria	Alena Lux	2:50.48	ELM

=== Semi-finals ===
Match	Country	Athlete	Result	Progression
1	Germany	Carolina Guerra Gonzalez	2:36.89	Gold medal race
1	Czech Republic	Marie Zavadilova	2:48.92	Bronze medal race
2	China	Liu Lili	2:43.60	Gold medal race
2	Spain	Blanca López Valera	3:15.50	Bronze medal race

=== Final rounds ===
==== Bronze medal race ====
Rank	Country	Athlete	Result	Notes
3rd place, bronze medalist(s)	Spain	Blanca López Valera	2:50.19	
4	Czech Republic	Marie Zavadilova	2:50.40	

==== Gold medal race ====
Rank	Country	Athlete	Result	Notes
1st place, gold medalist(s)	China	Liu Lili	2:39.65	
2nd place, silver medalist(s)	Germany	Carolina Guerra Gonzalez	2:53.88	

=== Final ranking ===
Rank	NOC	Athlete
1	China	LIU Lili
2	Germany	GUERRA GONZALEZ Carolina
3	Spain	LOPEZ VALERA Blanca
4	Czech Republic	ZAVADILOVA Marie
5	Australia	GRIFFIN Camilla
6	Switzerland	BRENDLE Tanya
7	Austria	LUX Alena
8	Turkey	OZDEMIR Elif
9	Finland	HAKALA Saaga
10	Great Britain	GILL Lexi
11	Ireland	DUNNE Kate
12	United States	GROVE Allison
13	Thailand	PHENGSAWANG Thatchaporn
14	Ukraine	RADCHENKO Viktoriia
15	Egypt	ALI Alia
16	France	GUILLOTON Elisa
17	Tunisia	AMARI Sarra
18	Hong Kong	CHEN Wai Hei
19	Italy	CASSINA Giorgia
20	Zimbabwe	ROBINSON Arianna
21	Latvia	KLUJEVA Sofija
22	Algeria	BENNACER Ghizlene Besma
23	Paraguay	GIMENEZ Victoria
23	Japan	ASAKURA Maki
25	Cyprus	POLYCARPOU Evgenia Maria
26	El Salvador	TOWNSEND Natalia
27	Romania	NEICU Crina Adelina
28	American Samoa	VAOULI Tupulua
29	Mexico	WEBER LOZANO Frida
30	Senegal	CISSE Diadou
31	Honduras	LARA Elena
32	Kuwait	KHALEEFOH Jenan
