= India at the Youth Olympics =

- Flag of India
- IOC code: IND
- NOC: Indian Olympic Association
- Website: olympic.ind.in
- Medals Ranked 51st: Gold 5 Silver 19 Bronze 9 Total 33

Summer appearances
- 2010; 2014; 2018; 2026

Winter appearances
- 2012; 2016; 2020; 2024

India has sent athletes to every edition of the Youth Olympic Games except the 2020 winter games. The Indian Olympic Association is the National Olympic Committee for India.

The Indian athletes have won a total of 33 medals (5 of them gold) at the Summer Youth Olympic Games. India had its best performance in the 2018 summer games, winning thirteen medals including three gold. The country has not yet won a medal at the Winter Youth Olympic Games.

== Medal tables ==
=== Summer Games ===
Games	Athletes	Gold	Silver	Bronze	Total	Rank
2010 Singapore	32	0	6	2	8	58
2014 Nanjing	32	0	1	1	2	64
2018 Buenos Aires	46	3	9	1	13	17
2026 Dakar	17	2	3	5	10	17
Total	127	5	19	9	33	51

=== Winter Games ===
Games	Athletes	Gold	Silver	Bronze	Total	Rank
2012 Innsbruck	1	0	0	0	0	-
2016 Lillehammer	1	0	0	0	0	-
2020 Lausanne	Did not participate					
2024 Gangwon	1	0	0	0	0	-
Total	3	0	0	0	0	-

== Medals by sport ==
Summer sports
Sport	Gold	Silver	Bronze	Total
Shooting	2	2	0	4
Boxing	2	1	1	4
Weightlifting	1	1	0	2
Athletics	0	3	2	5
Wrestling	0	3	1	4
Badminton	0	3	0	3
Field hockey	0	2	0	2
Judo	0	2	0	2
Archery	0	1	1	2
Tennis	0	1	0	1
Swimming	0	0	3	3
Wushu	0	0	1	1
Totals (12 entries)	5	19	9	33

== Medalists ==
Indian Youth Olympic medalist
Medal	Name/Team	Games	Sport	Event	Date
Silver	Pooja Dhanda	2010 Singapore	Wrestling	Girls' Freestyle 60kg	16 Aug 2010
Silver	Prannoy Kumar	2010 Singapore	Badminton	Boys' Singles	19 Aug 2010
Silver	Yuki Bhambri	2010 Singapore	Tennis	Boys' Singles	21 Aug 2010
Silver	Arjun Arjun	2010 Singapore	Athletics	Boys' Discus throw	21 Aug 2010
Silver	Kumar Durgesh	2010 Singapore	Athletics	Boys' 400m hurdles	23 Aug 2010
Silver	Shiva Thapa	2010 Singapore	Boxing	Men's Bantam 54kg	25 Aug 2010
Bronze	Satywart Kadian	2010 Singapore	Wrestling	Boys' Freestyle 100kg	17 Aug 2010
Bronze	Vikas Krishan Yadav	2010 Singapore	Boxing	Men's Light 60kg	24 Aug 2010
Bronze	Neha Thakur	2010 Singapore	Judo	Mixed team	25 Aug 2010
Silver	Venkat Rahul Ragala	2014 Nanjing	Weightlifting	Boys' 77 kg	21 August 2014
Bronze	Atul Verma	2014 Nanjing	Archery	Boys' Individual	26 August 2014
Gold	Jeremy Lalrinnunga	2018 Buenos Aires	Weightlifting	Boys' 62 kg	8 October 2018
Gold	Manu Bhaker	2018 Buenos Aires	Shooting	Girls' 10 metre air pistol	9 October 2018
Gold	Saurabh Chaudhary	2018 Buenos Aires	Shooting	Boys' 10 metre air pistol	10 October 2018
Silver	Lakshya Sen	2018 Buenos Aires	Badminton	Mixed team	12 October 2018
Silver	Tushar Mane	2018 Buenos Aires	Shooting	Boys' 10 metre air rifle	7 October 2018
Silver	Tababi Devi	2018 Buenos Aires	Judo	Girls' 44 kg	7 October 2018
Silver	Mehuli Ghosh	2018 Buenos Aires	Shooting	Girls' 10 metre air rifle	8 October 2018
Silver	Tababi Devi	2018 Buenos Aires	Judo	Mixed team	10 October 2018
Silver	Manu Bhaker	2018 Buenos Aires	Shooting	Mixed 10 metre air pistol	12 October 2018
Silver	Simran Kaur	2018 Buenos Aires	Wrestling	Girls' freestyle 43 kg	13 October 2018
Silver	Boy's Field Hockey Team: Prashant Chauhan; Shivam Anand; Rahul Rajbhar; Maninder Singh; Rabichandra Moirangathem; Sudeep Chirmako; Pawan Malik; Sanjay Kumar; Vivek Prasad	2018 Buenos Aires	Field hockey	Boys' tournament	14 October 2018
Silver	Girls' Field Hockey Team: Bichu Devi Kharibam; Ishika Chaudhary; Khushboo Khan; Salima Tete; Mumtaz Khan; Baljeet Kaur; Chetna Rathi; Reet; Lalremsiami	2018 Buenos Aires	Field hockey	Girls' tournament	14 October 2018
Silver	Suraj Panwar	2018 Buenos Aires	Athletics	Boys' 5 km walk	15 October 2018
Silver	Akash Malik	2018 Buenos Aires	Archery	Boys' individual	15 October 2018
Bronze	Praveen Chithravel	2018 Buenos Aires	Athletics	Boys' triple jump	16 October 2018
Gold	Ambekar Meetei	2026 Dakar	Boxing	Men's 50 kg	12 November 2026
Gold	Gunjan	2026 Dakar	Boxing	Women's 48 kg	12 November 2026
Silver	Khushbu Darjada	2026 Dakar	Judo	Women's 63 kg	2 November 2026
Silver	Tanvi Patri	2026 Dakar	Badminton	Women's singles	5 November 2026
Silver	Taniya	2026 Dakar	Beach wrestling	Girls' 75 kg	7 November 2026
Bronze	Dhinidhi Desinghu	2026 Dakar	Swimming	Women's 100 m freestyle	2 November 2026
Bronze	Lanchenbi Chanu	2026 Dakar	Wushu	Women's changquan	3 November 2026
Bronze	Dhinidhi Desinghu	2026 Dakar	Swimming	Women's 200 m freestyle	6 November 2026
Bronze	Tirthank Pegu	2026 Dakar	Swimming	Men's 200 m butterfly	6 November 2026
Bronze	Shourya Ambure	2026 Dakar	Athletics	Women's 100 m hurdles	8 November 2026

Note: Medals awarded to participants of Mixed-NOC teams are represented in (italics). These medals are not counted towards the Individual NOC Medal tally.

== See also ==
- India at the Olympics
- India at the Deaflympics
- India at the Paralympics
- India at the Asian Games
- India at the Asian Para Games
- India at the Asian Youth Games
- India at the Commonwealth Games
- India at the Lusofonia Games
- India at the South Asian Games
