= Mexico at the 2026 Summer Youth Olympics =

- Flag of Mexico
- IOC code: MEX
- NOC: Mexican Olympic Committee
- Website: soycom.org (in Spanish)

in Dakar, Senegal October 31, 2026 – November 13, 2026
- Competitors: 62 in 19 sports
- Flag bearer: Ariadna Chávez / Daniel Saborío
- Medals Ranked 63rd: Gold 0 Silver 3 Bronze 11 Total 14

Summer Youth Olympics appearances (overview)
- 2010; 2014; 2018; 2026

Mexico competed at the 2026 Summer Youth Olympics in Dakar, Senegal from October 31 to November 13, 2026. This was Mexico's fourth appearance at the Summer Youth Olympics, having appeared in all previous editions since its creation in 2010. Each sport's federation, in coordination with CONADE, established their specific selection process according to the available quotas. The official delegation was presented on 17 October 2026 by the Mexican Olympic Committee's director, María José Alcalá, with a total of 62 athletes. Judoka Ariadna Chávez and swimmer Daniel Saborío were appointed as flagbearers for the opening ceremony.

Mexico concluded this edition of the Youth Olympics with 14 medals, surpassing their previous highest total of 12 obtained in 2018. However, this time, the country did not obtain a gold medal.

== Medalists ==
Medal	Name	Sport	Event	Date
2nd place, silver medalist(s)	Karen Ríos	Beach wrestling	Women's -45kg	8 November
2nd place, silver medalist(s)	Carlo Cruz	Athletics	Men's pole vault	10 November
2nd place, silver medalist(s)	Guillermo Cortés	Taekwondo	Men's -63kg	10 November
3rd place, bronze medalist(s)	Daniel Saborío	Swimming	Men's 400m freestyle	3 November
3rd place, bronze medalist(s)	Team Mexico	Baseball5	Tournament	3 November
3rd place, bronze medalist(s)	Fernanda García	Swimming	Women's 50m butterfly	4 November
3rd place, bronze medalist(s)	Daniel Saborío	Swimming	Men's 200m freestyle	6 November
3rd place, bronze medalist(s)	Kendra Duany	Athletics	Women's discus throw	8 November
3rd place, bronze medalist(s)	Aline Herrera	Taekwondo	Women's -55kg	10 November
3rd place, bronze medalist(s)	Alison Salinas	Athletics	Women's hammer throw	10 November
3rd place, bronze medalist(s)	Alan Ocampo	Boxing	Men's -50 kg	11 November
3rd place, bronze medalist(s)	Jorge Luis Nieblas	Boxing	Men's -70 kg	11 November
3rd place, bronze medalist(s)	Jorge Martínez	Taekwondo	Men's -73kg	11 November
3rd place, bronze medalist(s)	Guillermo Cortés; Aline Herrera; Jorge Martínez; Vania Mondragón	Taekwondo	Mixed team	12 November

== Competitors ==
The following is the list of number of competitors participating at the Games per sport/discipline.

Sport	Men	Women	Total
3x3 basketball	0	4	4
Archery	1	1	2
Artistic gymnastics	3	3	6
Athletics	4	4	8
Baseball5	4	4	8
Badminton	0	1	1
Beach handball	0	10	10
Beach volleyball	0	2	2
Beach wrestling	0	2	2
Boxing	3	1	4
Coastal rowing	1	1	2
Judo	0	1	1
Road cycling	1	1	2
Sailing	0	1	1
Skateboarding	0	1	1
Swimming	1	1	2
Taekwondo	2	2	4
Triathlon	1	0	1
Wushu	0	1	1
Total	21	41	62

== 3x3 basketball ==
Mexico entered a team for the women's tournament as one of the two participating teams from the Americas.

Athlete	Event	Pool play			Quarterfinal	Semifinal	Final / BM	
Athlete	Event	Opposition Score	Opposition Score	Group Rank	Opposition Score	Opposition Score	Opposition Score	Rank
Vania González; Victoria Hernández; Maya Pimentel; Yania Valverde	Women's tournament	Chinese Taipei; L 14–21	Chile; L 9–16	3	Did not advance			10

== Archery ==
Mexico entered two archers, one of each gender.

Men

Athlete	Event	Ranking Round		Round of 32	Round of 16	Quarterfinals	Semifinals	Final / BM	Rank
Athlete	Event	Score	Seed	Opposition Score	Opposition Score	Opposition Score	Opposition Score	Opposition Score	Rank
Diego Góngora	Individual	661	16	Raz (ISR); L 5–6	Did not advance				18

Women

Athlete	Event	Ranking Round		Round of 32	Round of 16	Quarterfinals	Semifinals	Final / BM	Rank
Athlete	Event	Score	Seed	Opposition Score	Opposition Score	Opposition Score	Opposition Score	Opposition Score	Rank
Maya Casas	Individual	652	10	Harris (GBR); W 6–4	Yeo (SGP); L 5–6	Did not advance			9

Mixed

Athlete	Event	Ranking Round		Round of 16	Quarterfinals	Semifinals	Final / BM	Rank
Athlete	Event	Score	Seed	Opposition Score	Opposition Score	Opposition Score	Opposition Score	Rank
Maya Casas; Diego Góngora	Team	1313	9	Spain; L 4–5	Did not advance			11

== Artistic gymnastics ==
Mexico entered six gymnasts, three male and three female. The competition was modified from the senior events by not having individual apparatus' medals and it marked the debut of the mixed team event.

Men

Athlete	Event	Qualification										Final									
Athlete	Event	Apparatus								Total	Rank	Apparatus								Total	Rank
Athlete	Event	F	PH	R	V			PB	HB	Total	Rank	F	PH	R	V			PB	HB	Total	Rank
Athlete	Event	F	PH	R	1	2	Average	PB	HB	Total	Rank	F	PH	R	1	2	Average	PB	HB	Total	Rank
Hugo Pérez	Team	~~10.366~~	11.533	~~10.800~~	13.333			~~11.100~~	~~8.966~~	—N/a		—N/a	11.466	—N/a	13.233			—N/a	—N/a	—N/a	
Saúl Valenzuela	Team	12.366	~~9.933~~	12.300	~~13.133~~			11.700	10.066	—N/a		11.066	—N/a	12.600	—N/a			11.366	9.766	—N/a	
Lorenzo Zaragoza	Team	12.866	10.566	11.866	13.633			11.800	12.966	—N/a		12.366	9.200	12.766	13.866			12.466	12.933	—N/a	
Total	Team	—N/a								144.995	8 Q	—N/a								143.094	7
Hugo Pérez	All-around	10.366	11.533	10.800	13.333			11.100	8.966	66.098	48	Did not advance									
Saúl Valenzuela	All-around	12.366	9.933	12.300	13.133			11.700	10.066	69.498	39	Did not advance									
Lorenzo Zaragoza	All-around	12.866	10.566	11.866	13.633			11.800	12.966	73.697	14 Q	12.366	11.333	11.700	12.666			12.166	11.566	71.797	14

For the team event, all 3 athletes will participate but the 2 highest scores will be taken for the total. In the final, only two athletes can participate per rotation but do not need to be the same 2 for the whole competition. For the all-around, participation in all apparatus is optional but, only the top 18 athletes who completed the 6 apparatus will qualify for the final.

Women

Athlete	Event	Qualification								Final							
Athlete	Event	Apparatus						Total	Rank	Apparatus						Total	Rank
Athlete	Event	V			UB	BB	F	Total	Rank	V			UB	BB	F	Total	Rank
Athlete	Event	1	2	Average	UB	BB	F	Total	Rank	1	2	Average	UB	BB	F	Total	Rank
Sophia García	Team	~~11.500~~			9.333	9.500	~~9.966~~	—N/a		—N/a							
Camila Valdespino	Team	11.533			~~9.266~~	10.600	10.633	—N/a		—N/a							
Francia Zolozábal	Team	12.166			10.166	~~7.466~~	10.166	—N/a		—N/a							
Total	Team	—N/a						83.797	11	Did not advance							
Sophia García	All-around	11.500			9.333	9.500	9.966	40.299	46	Did not advance							
Camila Valdespino	All-around	11.533			9.266	10.600	10.633	42.032	43	Did not advance							
Francia Zolozábal	All-around	12.166			10.166	7.466	10.166	39.964	47	Did not advance							

For the team event, all 3 athletes will participate but the 2 highest scores will be taken for the total. In the final, only those two athletes can participate (unless there is an injury). For the all-around, participation in all apparatus is optional but, only the top 18 athletes who completed the 4 apparatus will qualify for the final.

Mixed

Athlete	Event	Qualification								Final							
Athlete	Event	Apparatus						Total	Rank	Apparatus						Total	Rank
Athlete	Event	F	PB	HB	UB	BB	F	Total	Rank	F	PB	HB	UB	BB	F	Total	Rank
Hugo Pérez	Mixed; Team	~~10.366~~	~~11.100~~	~~8.966~~	—N/a												
Saúl Valenzuela	Mixed; Team	~~12.366~~	~~11.700~~	~~10.066~~	—N/a												
Lorenzo Zaragoza	Mixed; Team	12.866	11.800	12.966	—N/a												
Sophia García	Mixed; Team	—N/a			~~9.333~~	~~9.500~~	~~9.966~~	—N/a									
Camila Valdespino	Mixed; Team	—N/a			~~9.266~~	10.600	10.633	—N/a									
Francia Zolozábal	Mixed; Team	—N/a			10.166	~~7.466~~	~~10.166~~	—N/a									
Total	Mixed; Team	—N/a						69.031	19	Did not advance							

For the mixed event, the top 12 NOCs will advance to the final based on the highest single best athlete’s final score in the qualification round on each of the following apparatus: floor, parallel bars, and horizontal bar for men, and on uneven bars, balance beam, and floor for women. For the final, the same 2 athletes will compete in 3 rounds consisting of one apparatus (from the ones listed above) per round per gender. The top 8 teams advance to Round 2 where another apparatus is selected and the top 4 teams will advance to Round 3 for the medals.

== Athletics ==
Mexico qualified three male and two females athletes for track events after their performances at the Olimpiada Nacional in Yucatán from 8 to 25 May 2026 and other competitions during the year. The country also qualified three athletes (one male and two females) for field events due to their overall performance during the year.

Key

- N/A = Round not applicable for the event
- PB = Personal Best
- DSQ = Disqualified
- DNS = Did not start

=== Track & road events ===
Men

Athlete	Event	Semifinal		Final	
Athlete	Event	Result	Rank	Result	Rank
Enrique Ramírez	1500 m	—N/a		4:00.29	4
Pedro Jaramillo	3000 m	—N/a		8:18.41 PB	5
Mauricio Camacho	2000 m steeplechase	—N/a		5:50.80 PB	7

Women

Athlete	Event	Semifinal		Final	
Athlete	Event	Result	Rank	Result	Rank
Kenya Cuahutle	3000 m	—N/a		10:22.21	7
América López	5000 m athletic walk	—N/a		25:31.62	5

=== Field events ===
Men

Athlete	Event	Final	
Athlete	Event	Distance	Position
Carlo Cruz	Pole vault	4.85	2nd place, silver medalist(s)

Women

Athlete	Event	Final	
Athlete	Event	Distance	Position
Kendra Duany	Discus throw	48.44	3rd place, bronze medalist(s)
Alison Salinas	Hammer throw	61.52	3rd place, bronze medalist(s)

== Badminton ==
Mexico entered one female player due to her performance at the Pan Am Junior Championships in João Pessoa, Brazil from 19 to 27 July 2026 and in other international competitions.

Athlete	Event	Group stage				Quarterfinals	Semifinals	Final / BM	
Athlete	Event	Opposition Result	Opposition Result	Opposition Result	Group Rank	Opposition Result	Opposition Result	Opposition Result	Rank
Sara Delgado	Women's singles	Adepu (AUS); L 0–2 (11–21, 14–21)	Patri (IND); L 0–2 (8–21, 12–21)	Jang (KOR); L 0–2 (11–21, 18–21)	4	Did not advance			=25

== Baseball5 ==
Mexico entered a team as one of the two participating countries from the Americas. The selection was made by the International Olympic Committee, in collaboration with the WBSC, based on the Dakar 2026 Participation Principles approved by the IOC Executive Board in March 2025.

Summary

Team	Event	Group stage				Quarterfinals	Semifinals	Final / PG / BM	
Team	Event	Opposition Result	Opposition Result	Opposition Result	Group Rank	Opposition Result	Opposition Result	Opposition Result	Rank
Alexandra Frías; Sebastián Leal; Abril Martínez; Jesús Mendoza; Carlos Mercado; Isaac Rodríguez; Erika Solís; Edsy Valenzuela	Tournament	Syria; W 2–1 (12–1, 9–11, 12–2)	Kenya; L 0–2 (5–6, 5–6)	France; W 2–0 (7–5, 16–6)	2 Q	Turkey; W 2–0 (10–5, 12–7)	Chinese Taipei; L 1–2 (2–12, 8–2, 2–7)	Kenya; W 2–1 (13–4, 2–3, 7–2)	3rd place, bronze medalist(s)

== Beach handball ==
Mexico entered a team for the women's tournament.

Summary

Team	Event	Group stage				Quarterfinals	5th-8th Classification	Semifinals	Final / PG / BM	
Team	Event	Opposition Result	Opposition Result	Opposition Result	Group Rank	Opposition Result	Opposition Result	Opposition Result	Opposition Result	Rank
Yunuen Álvarez; Abril Anguiano; Camila Calleros; Karen Díaz; Melina Hernández; Daniela López; Melissa Monraz; María Muñoz; Celeste Rosales; Mariana Vega	Women's tournament	Croatia; L 0–2 (14–25, 10–22)	Spain; L 0–2 (14–27, 16–24)	China; L 1–2 (12–28, 23–20, 4–8)	4 Q	Uruguay; L 0–2 (15–24, 12–23)	China; W 2–1 (21–20, 4–14, 6–2)	Did not advance	Croatia; L 1–2 (14–24, 21–18, 8–9)	6

== Beach volleyball ==
Mexico entered two athletes for the women's tournament.

Summary

Team	Event	Group stage				Round of 16	Quarterfinals	Semifinals	Final / BM	
Team	Event	Opposition Result	Opposition Result	Opposition Result	Group Rank	Opposition Result	Opposition Result	Opposition Result	Opposition Result	Rank
Celia López; Ángela Pérez	Women's tournament	Ecuador; Habze/Parraga; W 2–0 (21–10, 21–11)	Switzerland; Eugster/Gähwiler; W 2–1 (21–18, 17–21, 15–13)	Puerto Rico; Rodríguez/Serrano; W 2–0 (21–12, 21–6)	1 Q	Senegal; Segnane/Tine; W 2–0 (21–13, 21–14)	China; Qi/Zhuang; L 0–2 (12–21, 26–28)	Did not advance		=5

== Beach wrestling ==
Mexico registered two female athletes based on available quotas and their performance during the year.

Key:

- VFA (ranking points: 3–0 or 0–3) – Victory by 3-point move and the loser without technical points.
- VFA1 (ranking points: 3–1 or 1–3) – Victory by 3-point move and the loser with technical points.
- VSU (ranking points: 3–0 or 0–3) – Victory by non 3-point move and the loser without technical points.
- VSU1 (ranking points: 3–1 or 1–3) – Victory by non 3-point move and the loser with technical points.
- VPO (ranking points: 2-1 or 1-2) - Victory with less than 3 points.
- VFO (ranking points: 2–0 or 0–2) – Victory by forfeit.

Women

Athlete	Weight	Group stage				Semifinal	Final / BM	
Athlete	Weight	Opposition Result	Opposition Result	Opposition Result	Group Rank	Opposition Result	Opposition Result	Rank
Karen Ríos	-45 kg	Iliyna (BUL); W VFA 3–0	Rubio (COL); W VSU1 3–1	Brem (GBS); W VSU1 4–2	1 Q	Grib (ALG); W VFA1 5–1	Diatta (SEN); L VSU1 1–3	2nd place, silver medalist(s)
María José Paz	-75 kg	Oyola (VEN); L VSU 0–3	Zhao (CHN); L VSU 0–3	Seregi (SRB); L VPO 1–2	4	Did not advance		11

== Boxing ==
Mexico entered four athletes, three male and one female.

Men

Athlete	Weight	Round of 16	Quarterfinals	Semifinals	Final	
Athlete	Weight	Opposition Result	Opposition Result	Opposition Result	Opposition Result	Rank
Alan Ocampo	-50 kg	Chan (HKG); W 5–0	Dean (NZL); W 5–0	Jubani (IRL); L 0–5	Did not advance	3rd place, bronze medalist(s)
Víctor Rocha	-65 kg	Prohnevsky (ISR); L 0–5	Did not advance			=9
Jorge Luis Nieblas	-70 kg	Bye	Gulbis (LAT); W 5–0	Ashirbay (KAZ); L 0–5	Did not advance	3rd place, bronze medalist(s)

Women

Athlete	Weight	Round of 16	Quarterfinals	Semifinals	Final	
Athlete	Weight	Opposition Result	Opposition Result	Opposition Result	Opposition Result	Rank
Atena Juárez	-48 kg	Durango (COL); W RSC	Gunjan (IND); L 0–5	Did not advance		=5

== Coastal rowing ==
Mexico entered two rowers, one male and one female, after their performances at the Olimpiada Nacional in Yucatán from 8 to 25 May 2026.

Men

Athlete	Event	Time Trials				Round of 16	Quarterfinals	Semifinals	Final / BM	
Athlete	Event	Time	Rank	Time	Rank	Opposition Result	Opposition Result	Opposition Result	Opposition Result	Rank
Enrique Morelos	JM1x	2:54.06	21	2:36.52	7 Q	Moursi (EGY); L 2:23.25–2:21.01	Did not advance			10

Women

Athlete	Event	Time Trials				Round of 16	Quarterfinals	Semifinals	Final / BM	
Athlete	Event	Time	Rank	Time	Rank	Opposition Result	Opposition Result	Opposition Result	Opposition Result	Rank
Frida Weber	JW1x	DNF	NR	3:13.49	21	Did not advance				29

The top 8 during Time Trial 1 advance directly to the round of 16, the remaining boats have to compete in Time Trial 2, where the top 8 will advance to the knockout rounds while the remaining 16 boats are eliminated. As she had a DNF during the first time trial, she would have been eliminated from the competition. However, the World Rowing Executive Committee decided to allow her to compete in the second time trial.

Mixed

Athlete	Event	Time Trials				Round of 16	Quarterfinals	Semifinals	Final / BM	
Athlete	Event	Time	Rank	Time	Rank	Opposition Result	Opposition Result	Opposition Result	Opposition Result	Rank
Enrique Morelos; Frida Weber	JMix2x	2:50.75	17	2:34.12	6 Q	China; L 2:28.91–2:16.57	Did not advance			15

== Judo ==
Mexico entered one female judoka based on the available quotas assigned by the International Judo Federation.

Women

Athlete	Event	Round of 16	Quarterfinals	Semifinals	Repechage 1	Repechage 2	Final / BM	
Athlete	Event	Opposition Result	Opposition Result	Opposition Result	Opposition Result	Opposition Result	Opposition Result	Rank
Ariadna Chávez	-78 kg	Bye	Dobrovolskaia (RUS); L 0–102 IPP	Did not advance	Cheng (CHN); L 0–101 IPP	Did not advance		=9

== Road cycling ==
Mexico entered two athletes, one male and one female.

Men

Athlete	Event	Time	Rank
Gianluigi Zamudio	Road race	1:47:10	5
Gianluigi Zamudio	Time trial	10:38.42	10

Women

Athlete	Event	Time	Rank
Nabyenka Bareño	Road race	1:31:19	8
Nabyenka Bareño	Time trial	12:07.13	7

== Sailing ==
Mexico entered one female athlete after her performance during year.

Athlete	Event	Opening Series – Points per Race															Total points	Net points	Final rank
Athlete	Event	1	2	3	4	5	6	7	8	9	10	11	12	13	14	15	Total points	Net points	Final rank
Maryluz Rodríguez	Women's Techno 293OD	17	20	~~22~~	16	19	18	~~24~~; ~~[OCS]~~	21	22	15	20	18	20	18	Cancelled	270	202	20

OCS = On the course side. Two highest race scores get deleted.

== Skateboarding ==
Mexico entered one female athlete based on available quotas.

Athlete	Event	Heats							Final						
Athlete	Event	Run 1	Run 2	Trick 1	Trick 2	Trick 3	Total	Rank	Run 1	Run 2	Trick 1	Trick 2	Trick 3	Total	Rank
María José Cabrera	Women's Street	24.64	~~19.80~~	~~0.00~~	~~50.11~~	54.15	78.79	10	Did not advance						

Each skater has 2 runs and can perform 3 tricks. The highest score of the 2 runs and the highest score of the 3 tricks are added up to make the total. The top 6 in the combined ranking of the heats qualify to the final.

== Swimming ==
Mexico entered one male and one female swimmers who were selected by the technical commission of Aquatics Mexico.

Key

- Ranks given are overall position after all heats
- Q = Qualified for Final
- DSQ = Disqualified
- DNS = Did not start

Men

Athlete	Event	Heats		Final	
Athlete	Event	Time	Rank	Time	Rank
Daniel Saborío	100m freestyle	51.18	4 Q	50.75	5
Daniel Saborío	200m freestyle	1:52.49	4 Q	1:49.68	3rd place, bronze medalist(s)
Daniel Saborío	400m freestyle	—N/a		3:52.72	3rd place, bronze medalist(s)

Women

Athlete	Event	Heats		Final	
Athlete	Event	Time	Rank	Time	Rank
Fernanda García	50m backstroke	29.54	6 Q	29.83	7
Fernanda García	50m butterfly	27.48	3 Q	27.49	3rd place, bronze medalist(s)
Fernanda García	200m backstroke	2:28.04	7 Q	2:26.84	7

== Taekwondo ==
Mexico entered two male and two female athletes.

Men

Athlete	Event	Round of 16	Quarterfinals	Semifinals	Final	
Athlete	Event	Opposition Result	Opposition Result	Opposition Result	Opposition Result	Rank
Guillermo Cortés	-63 kg	Bye	Hasnaoui (TUN); W 2–0	Duzel (TUR); W 2–1	Alzawahra (JOR); L 1–2	2nd place, silver medalist(s)
Jorge Martínez	-73 kg	Bye	Alhabishi (LBA); W 2–0	Aldahamsheh (JOR); L 0–2	Did not advance	3rd place, bronze medalist(s)

Women

Athlete	Event	Round of 16	Quarterfinals	Semifinals	Final	
Athlete	Event	Opposition Result	Opposition Result	Opposition Result	Opposition Result	Rank
Aline Herrera	-55 kg	Hadzic (GER); W 2–0	Kowengue (GAB); W 2–0	Haouani (TUN); L 1–2	Did not advance	3rd place, bronze medalist(s)
Vania Mondragón	-63 kg	Fellinger (GER); L 1–2	Did not advance			=9

Mixed

Athlete	Event	Quarterfinals	Semifinals	Repechage	Final / BM	
Athlete	Event	Opposition Result	Opposition Result	Opposition Result	Opposition Result	Rank
Guillermo Cortés; Aline Herrera; Jorge Martínez; Vania Mondragón	Team	Turkey; L 0–2	Did not advance	Saudi Arabia; W 2–0	Germany; W 2–1	3rd place, bronze medalist(s)

== Triathlon ==
Mexico entered one male athlete.

Athlete	Event	Time						Rank
Athlete	Event	Swim (750m)	Trans 1	Bike (20km)	Trans 2	Run (5km)	Total	Rank
Alessandro Cortez	Men's individual	8:31	0:21	28:22	0:28	16:24	54:06	6

== Wushu ==
Mexico entered one female athlete after quotas were assigned by the International Wushu Federation.

Athlete	Event	Preliminary Round						Final Round					
Athlete	Event	Gunshu		Changquan		Total Points	Final Rank	Gunshu		Changquan		Total Points	Final Rank
Athlete	Event	Points	Rank	Points	Rank	Total Points	Final Rank	Points	Rank	Points	Rank	Total Points	Final Rank
Samantha Rojas	Women's Changquan combined	8.540	6	8.036	8	16.576	7 Q	8.230	7	8.576	6	16.806	8
