= India at the 2026 Summer Youth Olympics =

- IOC code: IND
- NOC: Indian Olympic Association
- Website: https://olympic.ind.in/

in Dakar, Senegal 31 October 2026 – 13 November 2026
- Competitors: 17 in 11 sports
- Flag bearers: Dhinidhi Desinghu; Dev Ruparelia
- Medals Ranked 21st: Gold 2 Silver 3 Bronze 5 Total 10

Summer Youth Olympics appearances (overview)
- 2010; 2014; 2018; 2026

The Republic of India competed in the 2026 Summer Youth Olympics held in Dakar, Senegal from 31 October to 13 November 2026. This was the nation's fourth consecutive appearance since the inaugural edition. A total of 17 players participated in this edition across 11 different disciplines.

Swimmer Dhinidhi Desinghu and badminton player Dev Ruparelia served as the flag bearers for the opening ceremony.

== Medalists ==
Dhinidhi Desinghu won the country's first medal in this edition, a bronze in the women's 100 m freestyle event. This is also India's first-ever swimming medal at the Youth Olympics. Khushbu Darjada won the country's second medal, winning silver in the women's 63 kg event. Lanchenbi Chanu won the country's third medal, winning bronze in the women's changquan combined event. Tanvi Patri won the country's fourth medal and became the first Indian woman to win a medal at the Youth Olympics, winning silver after a close-fought final in the women's singles event. Dhinidhi Desinghu won the country's fifth medal and her second medal in this edition, becoming the first Indian player to win multiple medals in the Youth Olympics by winning bronze in the women's 200 m freestyle event. Tirthank Pegu won the country's sixth medal, taking bronze in the men's 200 m butterfly event. This marked India's best-ever swimming campaign at the Youth Olympics. Taniya won the country's first-ever beach wrestling medal and seventh overall medal in this edition by winning silver in the girl's 75 kg event. Shourya Ambure became the first Indian woman to win a medal in athletics by securing bronze in the women's 100 m hurdles event.

Medal	Name	Sport	Event	Date
Gold	Ambekar Meetei	Boxing	Men's 50 kg	12 Nov
Gold	Gunjan	Boxing	Women's 48 kg	12 Nov
Silver	Khushbu Darjada	Judo	Women's 63 kg	2 Nov
Silver	Tanvi Patri	Badminton	Women's singles	5 Nov
Silver	Taniya	Beach; Wrestling	Girl's 75 kg	7 Nov
Bronze	Dhinidhi Desinghu	Swimming	Women's 100 m freestyle	2 Nov
Bronze	Lanchenbi Chanu	Wushu	Women's changquan	3 Nov
Bronze	Dhinidhi Desinghu	Swimming	Women's 200 m freestyle	6 Nov
Bronze	Tirthank Pegu	Swimming	Men's 200 m butterfly	6 Nov
Bronze	Shourya Ambure	Athletics	Women's 100 m hurdles	8 Nov

Multi-medalists
Athlete	Sport	1st place, gold medalist(s)	2nd place, silver medalist(s)	3rd place, bronze medalist(s)	Total
Dhinidhi Desinghu	Swimming	0	0	2	2
Total		0	0	2	2

Medals by sport
Sport	1st place, gold medalist(s)	2nd place, silver medalist(s)	3rd place, bronze medalist(s)	Total
Boxing	2	0	0	2
Swimming	0	0	3	3
Badminton	0	1	0	1
Beach wrestling	0	1	0	1
Judo	0	1	0	1
Wushu	0	0	1	1
Athletics	0	0	1	1
Sailing	0	0	0	0
Total	2	3	5	10

Medals by gender
Gender	1st place, gold medalist(s)	2nd place, silver medalist(s)	3rd place, bronze medalist(s)	Total
Girls	1	3	4	8
Boys	1	0	1	2
Total	2	3	5	10

Medals by date
Day	Date	1st place, gold medalist(s)	2nd place, silver medalist(s)	3rd place, bronze medalist(s)	Total
Day 1	1 Nov	0	0	0	0
Day 2	2 Nov	0	1	1	2
Day 3	3 Nov	0	0	1	1
Day 4	4 Nov	0	0	0	0
Day 5	5 Nov	0	1	0	1
Day 6	6 Nov	0	0	2	2
Day 7	7 Nov	0	1	0	1
Day 8	8 Nov	0	0	1	1
Day 9	9 Nov	0	0	0	0
Day 10	10 Nov	0	0	0	0
Day 11	11 Nov	0	0	0	0
Day 12	12 Nov	2	0	0	2
Day 13	13 Nov	0	0	0	0
Total		2	3	5	10

== Competitors ==
India placed 17 athletes in 11 sports at the Youth Olympics.

Sports	Boys	Girls	Total	Events
Archery	0	1	1	1
Athletics	0	1	1	1
Badminton	1	1	2	2
Beach wrestling	2	2	4	4
Boxing	1	1	2	2
Equestrian	1	0	1	1
Judo	0	1	1	1
Sailing	0	1	1	1
Swimming	1	1	2	5
Table Tennis	0	1	1	1
Wushu	0	1	1	1
Total	6	11	17	20

== Archery ==
India entered only one archer for the tournament.

Athlete	Event	Ranking round		Round of 32	Round of 16	Quarterfinals	Semifinals	Final / BM	Rank
Athlete	Event	Score	Seed	Opposition Score	Opposition Score	Opposition Score	Opposition Score	Opposition Score	Rank
Gatha Khadake	Women's individual	687	3	Sore (CIV); W 6–0	Kenderova (BUL); W 6–0	Whang (USA); L 5^{9}–6^{9+}	Did not advance		

== Athletics ==
India entered one athlete to compete in track and road events.

Athlete	Event	Semi-finals		Final	
Athlete	Event	Result	Rank	Result	Rank
Shourya Ambure	Women's 100 m hurdles	13.77 PB	2 Q	13.59 PB	Bronze medal

== Badminton ==
India entered two players based on the BWF World Junior Rankings.

Athlete	Event	Seed	Group Stage				Quarterfinals	Semifinals	Final / BM	
Athlete	Event	Seed	Opposition Score	Opposition Score	Opposition Score	Rank	Opposition Score	Opposition Score	Opposition Score	Rank
Dev Ruparelia	Men's singles	2	Diagne (SEN); W 2–0	Bříza (CZE); W 2–0	Gullaiya (CAN); W 2–1	1 Q	Hong (CHN); L 0–2	Did not advance		
Tanvi Patri	Women's singles	3	Jang (KOR); W 2–0	Delgado González (MEX); W 2–0	Adepu (AUS); W 2–0	1 Q	Kakanik (THA); W 2–0	Watanabe (JPN); W 2–1	Zhang (CHN); L 1–2	Silver medal

== Beach wrestling ==
India entered four athletes to compete in beach wrestling events.

Wrestlers	Event	Group stage				Semi-final	Final / BM	
Wrestlers	Event	Opposition Score	Opposition Score	Opposition Score	Rank	Opposition Score	Opposition Score	Rank
Anuj	Boy's 70 kg	Torabi (IRI); L 0–3	Hafez (EGY); L 2–3	Sarr (SEN); W 2–1	3	Did not advance		
Deepanshu Khokhar	Men's 80 kg	Benelyassar (MAR); L 2–3	Suleymanli (AZE); L 0–3	Kebir (ALG); L 0–3	4	Did not advance		
Antra	Women's 65 kg	Rosado Valerio (DOM); L 1–2	Eningo (ESP); L 0–2	Wanjala (KEN); W 4–0	3	Did not advance		
Taniya	Girl's 75 kg	Bauer (GER); W 3–1	Karavanou (GRE); W 3–0	Väster (EST); W 4–1	1 Q	Hruby (USA); W 3–1	Zhao (CHN); L 1–2	Silver medal

== Boxing ==
India entered two boxers to compete at the Games.

Athlete	Event	Round of 16	Quarter-finals	Semi-finals	Final / RM	
Athlete	Event	Opposition Result	Opposition Result	Opposition Result	Opposition Result	Rank
Ambekar Meetei	Men's 50 kg	Faye (SEN); W 5–0	Abraham (NAM); W RSC	Arevalo (COL); W 5–0	Jubani (IRL); W 3–2	Gold medal
Gunjan	Women's 48 kg	—N/a	Calero (MEX); W 5–0	Bassett (GBR); W 4–1	Bensalah (ALG); W 5–0	Gold medal

== Equestrian ==
India entered one rider in the individual jumping events.

Athlete	Horse	Event	Qualification							Final		
Athlete	Horse	Event	Round A			Round B			Rank	Time	Penalties	Rank
Athlete	Horse	Event	Time	Penalties	Rank	Time	Penalties	Rank	Rank	Time	Penalties	Rank
Sresht Mantena	Crazy Horse Boop	Individual jumping	83.35	0	1	76.36	0	5	2 Q	38.60	4	7

== Judo ==
India entered one judoka to compete at the Games.

Athlete	Event	Round of 16	Quarter-finals	Semi-finals	Repechage	Final / BM	
Athlete	Event	Opposition Result	Opposition Result	Opposition Result	Opposition Result	Opposition Result	Rank
Khushbu Darjada	Women's 63 kg	Camara (GUI); W 001–000^{YUK}	Bouazzaoui (MAR); W 101–000^{IPP}	Berrahoual (ALG); W 100–002^{IPP}	—N/a	Reinhold (GER); L 000–101^{IPP}	Silver medal

== Sailing ==
India entered one sailor to compete at the Games.

Athlete	Event	Race														Total points	Net points	Final rank
Athlete	Event	I	II	III	IV	V	VI	VII	VIII	IX	X	XI	XII	XIII	XIV	Total points	Net points	Final rank
Priyanshi Patil	Women's windsurfing	3	4	~~7~~	10	9	~~13~~	5	8	5	6	5	~~11~~	10	~~14~~	110	72	6

Note: Race XV had been cancelled due to insufficient wind conditions.

== Swimming ==
India entered two swimmers to compete at the Games.

Athlete	Event	Heat		Final	
Athlete	Event	Time	Rank	Time	Rank
Tirthank Pegu	Men's 100 m butterfly	55.18	3 Q	54.98	4
Tirthank Pegu	Men's 200 m butterfly	2:05.30	3 Q	2:01.25	Bronze medal
Dhinidhi Desinghu	Women's 100 m freestyle	56.80	3 Q	56.27	Bronze medal
Dhinidhi Desinghu	Women's 200 m freestyle	2:04.51	1 Q	2:02.28	Bronze medal
Dhinidhi Desinghu	Women's 200 m individual medley	2:28.00	6 Q	2:23.88	5

== Table tennis ==
India entered one table tennis player to compete in the Games.

Athlete	Event	Seed	Group stage				Round of 16	Quarter-finals	Semi-finals	Final / BM	
Athlete	Event	Seed	Opposition Score	Opposition Score	Opposition Score	Rank	Opposition Score	Opposition Score	Opposition Score	Opposition Score	Rank
Syndrela Das	Women's singles	8	Borteye (GHA); W 3–0	Rajkowska (POL); W 3–0	Nakawala (UGA); W 3–0	1 Q	Loy (SGP); L 0–4	Did not advance			

== Wushu ==
India entered one wushu athlete to compete in Taolu events.

Athlete	Event	Preliminary Round				Final			
Athlete	Event	Routine	Score	Total	Rank	Routine	Score	Total	Rank
Lanchenbi Chanu	Women's Changquan	Gunshu	8.876	17.982	2 Q	Gunshu	8.723	18.039	Bronze medal
Lanchenbi Chanu	Women's Changquan	Changquan	9.106	17.982	2 Q	Changquan	9.316	18.039	Bronze medal
