= Athletics at the 2026 Summer Youth Olympics – Men's pole vault =

Men's pole vault athletics event at the 2026 Summer Youth Olympics

Men's pole vault at the IV Summer Youth Olympic Games
- Venue: Complexe Iba Mar Diop
- Date: 10 November
- Competitors: 8 from 8 nations
- Winning time: 4.95 m

Medalists
| 1st place, gold medalist(s) | | Axel Faye | France |
| 2nd place, silver medalist(s) | | Carlo Cruz Tovar | Mexico |
| 3rd place, bronze medalist(s) | | Tanakorn Daengmanee | Thailand |

The men's pole vault event at the 2026 Summer Youth Olympics was held on 10 November at the Complexe Iba Mar Diop in Dakar, Senegal.

== Schedule ==
All times are local (UTC±0).

| Date | Time | Round |
|---|---|---|
| 10 November 2026 | 15:59 | Final |

== Results ==
=== Final ===
The final was held from 15:59 to 17:36. Axel Faye of France won the gold medal with a clearance of 4.95 metres. Carlo Cruz Tovar of Mexico and Tanakorn Daengmanee of Thailand both cleared 4.85 metres, with Cruz Tovar taking silver and Daengmanee bronze.

| Rank | Athlete | Nation | 3.80 | 4.20 | 4.50 | 4.70 | 4.85 | 4.95 | 5.05 | 5.10 | 5.15 | Result | Remark |
|---|---|---|---|---|---|---|---|---|---|---|---|---|---|
| 1st place, gold medalist(s) | Axel Faye | France | – | – | – | o | xo | xo | – | – | xxx | 4.95 | |
| 2nd place, silver medalist(s) | Carlo Cruz Tovar | Mexico | – | – | – | o | o | xxx | | | | 4.85 | |
| 3rd place, bronze medalist(s) | Tanakorn Daengmanee | Thailand | – | – | o | xo | o | xxx | | | | 4.85 | |
| 4 | Gerfan Nigel Frank | Malaysia | – | – | xxo | xo | xxx | | | | | 4.70 | PB |
| 5 | Berat Ucuk | Turkey | – | o | o | xxx | | | | | | 4.50 | |
| 6 | Maksymilian Kania | Poland | – | xo | xo | xxx | | | | | | 4.50 | |
| 7 | Alyeldin Ibrahim | Egypt | xxo | o | xxx | | | | | | | 4.20 | =PB |
| 8 | Enmanuel Chávez | Venezuela | xo | xxx | | | | | | | | 3.80 | |
