= Sailing at the 2026 Summer Youth Olympics =

Sailing at the IV Summer Youth Olympic Games
- Venue: Saly Beach
- Dates: 8 – 12 November
- No. of events: 2 (1 boys, 1 girls)
- Competitors: 47 from 38 nations

Sailing at the 2026 Summer Youth Olympics was held from November 8 to 12 on Saly Beach in Senegal. There was two events, both sailed with the Techno 293.

The supposed 15th and final race for both the men's and women's races were cancelled due to wind conditions. The results from the 14 prior races were used to determine the standings for both races.

== Qualification ==
There is no qualification system for the sailing events at the 2026 Youth Olympics. NOCs can request quotas in events they wish to enter. The quotas was awarded in 2026.

Region	NOC	Men	Women
Africa	Algeria	Yes	Yes
Africa	Egypt	Yes	No
Africa	Libya	Yes	No
Africa	Morocco	Yes	Yes
Africa	Senegal	Yes	No
Africa	Tunisia	Yes	Yes
Americas	Argentina	Yes	No
Americas	Dominican Republic	Yes	No
Americas	Mexico	No	Yes
Americas	Peru	Yes	Yes
Americas	Venezuela	Yes	No
Asia	Cambodia	Yes	No
Asia	China	No	Yes
Asia	Chinese Taipei	No	Yes
Asia	Hong Kong	Yes	No
Asia	India	No	Yes
Asia	Malaysia	No	Yes
Asia	Philippines	Yes	No
Asia	Singapore	Yes	Yes
Asia	Thailand	Yes	Yes
Europe	Croatia	Yes	No
Europe	Czech Republic	Yes	No
Europe	Estonia	Yes	No
Europe	France	No	Yes
Europe	Great Britain	No	Yes
Europe	Greece	Yes	Yes
Europe	Hungary	Yes	No
Europe	Israel	No	Yes
Europe	Italy	No	Yes
Europe	Latvia	Yes	Yes
Europe	Lithuania	No	Yes
Europe	Poland	No	Yes
Europe	Portugal	Yes	No
Europe	Slovakia	Yes	No
Europe	Spain	No	Yes
Europe	Turkey	No	Yes
Oceania	Australia	Yes	Yes
Oceania	New Zealand	No	Yes

== Medal summary ==
=== Medal table ===
* Host nation (Senegal)

Rank	Nation	Gold	Silver	Bronze	Total
1	Greece	1	0	0	1
1	Italy	1	0	0	1
3	Hong Kong	0	1	0	1
3	Spain	0	1	0	1
5	China	0	0	1	1
5	Tunisia	0	0	1	1
Totals (6 entries)		2	2	2	6

=== Medalists ===
Event	Gold	Silver	Bronze
Men's Techno 293	Evangelos Kyriazakos; Greece	Ng Hoi Tik; Hong Kong	Rayen Briki; Tunisia
Women's Techno 293	Laura Grasso Castagnetta; Italy	Olivia Sánchez; Spain	Wu Ziyan; China
