= Archery at the 2026 Summer Youth Olympics – Women's individual =

Archery event at the 2026 Summer Youth Olympics

Women's individual at the 2026 Summer Youth Olympics
- Venue: Abdoulaye Wade Stadium
- Date: 6–9 November 2026
- Competitors: 32 from 32 nations

Medalists
gold medal	Dünya Yenihayat	Turkey
silver medal	Ye-eun Whang	United States
bronze medal	Sandra Pérez	Spain

The women's individual archery competition at the 2026 Summer Youth Olympics is being held from 6 to 9 November 2026 at the Abdoulaye Wade Stadium in Dakar, Senegal. The competition consisted of a ranking round followed by elimination matches.

== Ranking round ==
The ranking round was held on 6 November 2026. The 32 archers were ranked according to their scores, with the ranking determining the seedings for the elimination rounds. Dünya Yenihayat of Turkey finished first with 688 points, ahead of Kim Su-min of the Republic of Korea, who also scored 688 points. Yenihayat took the top seed through the higher number of Xs.

Rank	Archer	Nation	10s	Xs	Score
1	Dünya Yenihayat	Turkey	43	24	688
2	Kim Su-min	South Korea	44	18	688
3	Gatha Khadake	India	44	12	687
4	Sandra Pérez	Spain	32	11	673
5	Aurane Lapouge	France	35	14	671
6	Ye-eun Whang	United States	32	9	671
7	Tabitha Yeo	Singapore	32	15	668
8	Ellen Martini	Australia	29	8	661
9	Merle Edlich	Germany	25	7	657
10	Maya Casas	Mexico	21	6	652
11	Matilde Manini	Italy	23	9	650
12	Yuika Kamiyanagi	Japan	25	9	647
13	Adela Tollarovičová	Slovakia	17	3	645
14	Neda Kenderova	Bulgaria	23	6	644
15	Nouray Elsayed	Egypt	19	7	638
16	Huda Saleh Alali	United Arab Emirates	19	6	631
17	Daria Graur	Romania	13	3	630
18	Frederique Meijerse	Netherlands	16	3	628
19	Ritej Chaieb	Tunisia	22	10	627
20	Layla Viljoen	South Africa	11	3	624
21	Alexandra Rossier	Switzerland	15	3	623
22	Juana Cardona	Colombia	18	1	622
23	Jasmine Harris	Great Britain	17	8	619
24	Nicole Golovanevski	Israel	20	7	618
25	Alison Langley	Canada	9	4	609
26	Ella Yang	New Zealand	9	3	606
27	Teja Vidmar	Slovenia	11	3	604
28	Anna Kadlecová	Czech Republic	11	4	598
29	Selma Malak	Algeria	12	3	576
30	Sita Sore	Ivory Coast	7	1	569
31	Fatoumata Koulako Bah	Guinea	6	1	566
32	Luiza Langone	Brazil	8	2	565

== Elimination round ==
The top 32 archers advanced to the single-elimination stage. The first elimination round was held on 7 November, followed by the remaining elimination rounds and medal matches on 9 November.

=== Medal round ===
Semi-finals
1	Dünya Yenihayat (TUR)	7	27	29	30	30
4	Sandra Pérez (ESP)	1	27	28	28	29
6	Ye-eun Whang (USA)	6^{10}	27	27	29	30	28
7	Tabitha Yeo (SGP)	5^{8}	29	30	26	28	28

Gold medal match
1	Dünya Yenihayat (TUR)	6 ^{10+}	28	30	28	30	27
6	Ye-eun Whang (USA)	5^{10}	26	30	29	28	29
Bronze medal match
4	Sandra Pérez (ESP)	6	27	28	27	28	29
7	Tabitha Yeo (SGP)	4	27	27	29	28	28

=== Elimination round ===
==== Section 1 ====
Round of 32
1	D Yenihayat (TUR)	6	28	29	29
32	L Langone (BRA)	0	24	27	23
17	D Graur (ROU)	1	25	26	25	25
16	H S Alali (UAE)	7	27	26	26	28
9	M Edlich (GER)	7	27	28	21	27
24	N Golovanevski (ISR)	1	26	17	21	25
25	A Langley (CAN)	4	22	26	27	27	20
8	E Martini (AUS)	6	23	26	26	27	27

Round of 16
1	D Yenihayat (TUR)	6	28	29	29
16	H S Alali (UAE)	0	26	25	27
9	M Edlich (GER)	4	30	25	24	29	23
8	E Martini (AUS)	6	22	25	26	29	25

Quarter-finals
1	D Yenihayat (TUR)	6	28	30	30
8	E Martini (AUS)	0	25	27	27

==== Section 2 ====
Round of 32
5	A Lapouge (FRA)	6	28	28	26
28	A Kadlecová (CZE)	0	24	24	23
21	A Rossier (SUI)	6	27	27	27
12	Y Kamiyanagi (JPN)	0	26	25	24
13	A Tollarovičová (SVK)	6^{9}	29	27	26	28	29
20	L Viljoen (RSA)	5^{8}	27	27	27	28	29
29	S Malak (ALG)	0	24	24	26
4	S Pérez (ESP)	6	27	27	28

Round of 16
5	A Lapouge (FRA)	7	26	29	29	29	28
21	A Rossier (SUI)	3	26	28	30	25	23
13	A Tollarovičová (SVK)	1	25	25	29	27
4	S Pérez (ESP)	7	27	28	29	29

Quarter-finals
5	A Lapouge (FRA)	5^{9}	29	27	29	27	28
4	S Pérez (ESP)	6^{9+}	26	29	29	27	28

==== Section 3 ====
Round of 32
3	G Khadake (IND)	6	28	28	28
30	S Sore (CIV)	0	21	24	19
19	R Chaieb (TUN)	0	24	19	26
14	N Kenderova (BUL)	6	27	27	28
11	M Manini (ITA)	6	24	25	28	29
22	J Cardona (COL)	2	23	25	23	29
27	T Vidmar (SLO)	0	25	22	27
6	Y-e Whang (USA)	6	28	28	30

Round of 16
3	G Khadake (IND)	6	28	25	27
14	N Kenderova (BUL)	0	27	23	26
11	M Manini (ITA)	0	25	27	24
6	Y-e Whang (USA)	6	28	29	29

Quarter-finals
3	G Khadake (IND)	5^{9}	29	25	29	26	28
6	Y-e Whang (USA)	6^{9+}	27	29	25	27	28

==== Section 4 ====
Round of 32
7	T Yeo (SGP)	6	29	27	30
26	E Yang (NZL)	0	25	21	27
23	J Harris (GBR)	4	27	29	27	25	27
10	M Casas (MEX)	6	29	28	26	27	29
15	N Elsayed (EGY)	6	28	27	26
18	F Meijerse (NED)	0	25	25	22
31	F K Bah (GUI)	0	24	11	22
2	Kim S-m (KOR)	6	29	29	27

Round of 16
7	T Yeo (SGP)	6^{9+}	29	28	28	29	30
10	M Casas (MEX)	5^{9}	28	29	29	29	28
15	N Elsayed (EGY)	6^{10+}	27	29	26	26	28
2	Kim S-m (KOR)	5^{10}	27	28	29	29	27

Quarter-finals
7	' T Yeo (SGP)	6	30	28	230
15	N Elsayed (EGY)	0	27	27	5
