= Milaniia Kokhan =

Ukrainian hammer thrower (born 2009)

Personal information
- Born: 25 February 2009 (age 17)

Sport
- Sport: Athletics
- Event: Hammer throw
Medal record
Women's athletics
Representing Ukraine
Youth Olympic Games
| Gold medal – first place | 2026 Dakar | Hammer throw |
European U18 Championships
| Gold medal – first place | 2026 Rieti | Hammer throw |

Milaniia Kokhan (born 25 March 2009) is an Ukraine hammer thrower. She won the gold medal at the 2026 European Athletics U18 Championships and the 2026 Summer Youth Olympics.

== Biography ==
The sister of fellow-athlete Mykhaylo Kokhan, both athletes are coached by their father.

Kokhan set a personal best best 68.05 metres to qualify for the final of the 2026 European Athletics U18 Championships in Rieti, Italy, on 16 July 2026. She led in the final from the first until the final round, only to retake the lead and won the gold medal with a new personal best of 70.19 metres with the last throw of the competition. The gold medal matched the one won by her brother at the 2018 European U18 Championships in the same discipline. The distance was also became the season leading throw with the 3kg hammer by a European in that age category that season.

In November 2026, she entered the hammer throw competition at the 2026 Summer Youth Olympics in Dakar, Senegal, as the favourite. She won the gold medal with a new personal best throw of 71.27 metres. She celebrated the win with sunglasses in the style of the Olympic rings.
