= Thailand at the 2026 Summer Youth Olympics =

- Flag of Thailand
- IOC code: THA
- NOC: National Olympic Committee of Thailand
- Website: olympicthai.org/en/ (in English)

in Dakar, Senegal October 31, 2026 – November 13, 2026
- Competitors: 28 in 11 sports
- Flag bearers: Thitaphat Preechayan; Natthakittha Leekitchatkorn
- Medals: Gold 0 Silver 1 Bronze 1 Total 2

Summer Youth Olympics appearances (overview)
- 2010; 2014; 2018; 2026

Thailand is scheduled to compete at the 2026 Summer Youth Olympics in Dakar, Senegal, from 31 October to 13 November 2026. This will mark Thailand's fourth appearance at the Youth Olympics, after making its debut in 2010. The delegation will have 28 athletes in 11 sports.

Table tennis player Thitaphat Preechayan and swimmer Natthakittha Leekitchatkorn were the flag bearers for the opening ceremony.

== Medal summary ==
Medals by sport
Sport	1st place, gold medalist(s)	2nd place, silver medalist(s)	3rd place, bronze medalist(s)	Total
Athletics	0	0	1	1
Boxing	0	1	0	1
Total	0	1	1	2

=== Medalists ===
Medal	Name	Sport	Event	Date
Silver	Siwa Chainarong	Boxing	Men's 60 kg	12 November
Bronze	Tanakorn Daengmanee	Athletics	Men's pole vault	10 November

== Competitors ==
The following is the list of number of competitors participating at the Games per sport/discipline.

Sport	Men	Women	Total
Athletics	1	1	2
Badminton	1	1	2
Beach handball	10	0	10
Beach volleyball	0	2	2
Boxing	1	1	2
Coastal rowing	1	1	2
Judo	1	0	1
Road cycling	0	1	1
Sailing	1	1	2
Swimming	1	1	2
Table tennis	1	1	2
Total	18	10	28

== Athletics ==
Thailand entered two athletes, one of each gender.

Track & road events

Athlete	Event	Heat		Final	
Athlete	Event	Result	Rank	Result	Rank
Phichayapha Sukaue	Women's 400 m	57.24	4 Q	56.99	8

Field events

Athlete	Event	Final	
Athlete	Event	Distance	Rank
Tanakorn Daengmanee	Men's pole vault	4.85	3rd place, bronze medalist(s)

== Badminton ==
Thailand entered two athletes, one of each gender.

Athlete	Event	Group stage				Quarter-finals	Semi-finals	Final / BM	
Athlete	Event	Opposition Score	Opposition Score	Opposition Score	Rank	Opposition Score	Opposition Score	Opposition Score	Rank
Punnatat Prempunpong	Men's singles	Rodriguez (VEN); W 2–0	Ng (SGP); W 2–0	—N/a	1 Q	Malhan (UAE); L 0–2	Did not advance		
Kungkaew Kakanik	Women's singles	Halimi (ALG); W 2–0	Robati (IRI); W 2–0	Nguyễn (VIE); W 2–0	1 Q	Patri (IND); L 0–2	Did not advance		

== Beach handball ==
Thailand entered the boys' national team.

Summary

Team	Event	Group stage				Quarterfinal	Semifinal	Final / BM		Placement Round		
Team	Event	Opposition Score	Opposition Score	Opposition Score	Rank	Opposition Score	Opposition Score	Opposition Score	Rank	Opposition Score	Opposition Score	Rank
Thailand boys'	Mens' tournament	Germany; L 0–2	Tunisia; L 0–2	Cook Islands; W 2–0	3 Q	Senegal; L 0–2	Did not advance			Puerto Rico; W 2–1	Tunisia; L 0–2	6

Roster

- Rachan Boonnontae
- Nattpat Budprayoon
- Yotsakrit Jongbut
- Cahyanat Krueakongmat
- Dennis Permthong
- Rattkasat Pisutsirikul
- Kiardtisak Rueanyen
- Tanaphol Sambang
- Nathee Thongtee
- Thiwakon Yamprakon

== Beach volleyball ==
Thailand received a quota place for the women's tournament.

Athlete	Event	Group stage				Round of 16	Quarter-finals	Semi-finals	Final / BM	
Athlete	Event	Oppositions Score	Oppositions Score	Oppositions Score	Rank	Oppositions Score	Oppositions Score	Oppositions Score	Oppositions Score	Rank
Ainthira Ninsonthi; Phatthanan Wongnongwaeng	Women's	Both / de Groot (NED); L 0–2	Charissaki / Margaritopoulou (GRE); W 2–1	Fehri / Lourassi (TUN); W 2–0	2 Q	Bawa / Lawrence (NGR); L 0–2	Did not advance			

== Boxing ==
Thailand entered two boxers.

Athlete	Weight	Round of 16	Quarterfinals	Semifinals	Final	
Athlete	Weight	Opposition Result	Opposition Result	Opposition Result	Opposition Result	Rank
Siwa Chainarong	Men's –60 kg	Hernández (GUA); W 5–0	Agoda (TOG); W RSC	Arli (TUR); W 5–0	Torres (PUR); L RSC	2nd place, silver medalist(s)
Pemika Payungkasem	Women's –48 kg	Bensalah (ALG); L 0–5	Did not advance			

== Coastal rowing ==
Thailand entered two rowers, one of each gender.

Athlete	Event	Qualification 1		Qualification 2		Round of 16	Quarterfinal	Semifinal	Final	
Athlete	Event	Time	Rank	Time	Rank	Opposition Time	Opposition Time	Opposition Time	Opposition Time	Rank
Trairat Panthong	Men's solo	2:49.64	14 Q	2:45.43	20	Did not advance				
Thatchaporn Phengsawang	Women's solo	3:16.49	20 Q	3:01.92	6 Q	López (ESP); L 2:59.37–2:55.37	Did not advance			
Trairat Panthong; Thatchaporn Phengsawang	Mixed double sculls	2:41.29	11 Q	2:34.53	8 Q	Meyer / Guerra (GER); L 2:27.98–2:13.42	Did not advance			

== Judo ==
Thailand entered one male judoka based on the available quotas assigned by the International Judo Federation.

Athlete	Event	Round of 16	Quarterfinals	Semifinals	Repechage 1	Repechage 2	Final / BM	
Athlete	Event	Opposition Result	Opposition Result	Opposition Result	Opposition Result	Opposition Result	Opposition Result	Rank
Kanisorn Chinon	Men's –100 kg	Arai (JPN); L 000–110	Did not advance		Simić (SRB); L 000–100	Did not advance		

== Road cycling ==
Thailand entered one female athlete.

Athlete	Event	Time	Rank
Sunisa Chumthong	Women's Road race	1:45:26	35
Sunisa Chumthong	Women's Time trial	14:04.50	35

== Sailing ==
Thailand entered two athletes, one of each gender.

Athlete	Event	Opening Series – Points per Race														Total points	Net points	Final rank
Athlete	Event	1	2	3	4	5	6	7	8	9	10	11	12	13	14	Total points	Net points	Final rank
Ittipol Yomjinda	Men's windsurfing	9	~~13~~	5	~~15~~	5	2	4	2	4	4	5	3	~~13~~	10	94	53	4
Pompavit Butte	Women's windsurfing	10	6	6	11	4	~~14~~	9	~~14~~	7	8	6	~~17~~	14	12	183	93	9

== Swimming ==
Thailand entered two swimmers, one male and one female.

Athlete	Event	Heat		Final	
Athlete	Event	Time	Rank	Time	Rank
Supphakorn Jaikla	Men's 200 m freestyle	1:53.94	5	Did not advance	
Supphakorn Jaikla	Men's 400 m freestyle	4:10.16	8	Did not advance	
Natthakitta Leekitchakorn	Women's 50 m breaststroke	32.54	1 Q	32.44	4
Natthakitta Leekitchakorn	Women's 100 m breaststroke	1:13.02	2 Q	1:12.70	7

== Table tennis ==
Thailand entered two athletes (one male and one female).

Athlete	Event	Group Stage				Round of 16	Quarterfinal	Semifinal	Final / BM	
Athlete	Event	Opposition Result	Opposition Result	Opposition Result	Rank	Opposition Result	Opposition Result	Opposition Result	Opposition Result	Rank
Thitaphat Preechayan	Men's singles	Villavicencio (ECU); W 3–0	Faraji (IRI); L 0–3	Elsayed (EGY); L 1–3	3	Did not advance				
Kulapassr Vijitviriyagul	Women's singles	Guo Zheng (FRA); L 1–3	Andriantahina (MAD); W 3–0	Dávila (PUR); W 3–0	2 Q	Matsushima (JPN); L 2–4	Did not advance			
Thitaphat Preechayan; Kulapassr Vijitviriyagul	Mixed doubles	—N/a				Kuti / Ojo (NGR); W 3–1	Vegas / Ferrer (VEN); W 3–1	Li / Su (HKG); L 1–3	Lin / Chen (TPE); L 2–3	4
