= Athletics at the 2026 Summer Youth Olympics – Women's 5000 metres walk =

Women's 5000 metres walk at the 2026 Summer Youth Olympics

Women's 5000 metres walk at the IV Summer Youth Olympic Games
- Venue: Complexe Iba Mar Diop
- Date: 10 November
- Competitors: 10 from 10 nations
- Winning time: 22:58.33

Medalists
1st place, gold medalist(s)		Wang Yaru	China
2nd place, silver medalist(s)		Juste Andrijauskaite	Lithuania
3rd place, bronze medalist(s)		Daryna Kozka	Ukraine

The women's 5000 metres race walk event at the 2026 Summer Youth Olympics was held on 10 November at the Complexe Iba Mar Diop in Dakar, Senegal. The competition consisted of a single final phase.

China's Wang Yaru won the gold medal in 22:58.33. Juste Andrijauskaite of Lithuania finished second in 23:55.00, while Daryna Kozka of Ukraine took the bronze medal in 23:58.96.

== Schedule ==
The final was held on 10 November at 16:36 local time (UTC±0). The victory ceremony was scheduled for 17:45.

Date	Time	Round
10 November	16:36	Final
10 November	17:45	Victory ceremony

== Results ==
=== Final ===
The final was held on 10 November 2026 at 16:36. Three athletes were disqualified after receiving a fourth red card under technical rule TR54.7.5.

Rank	Bib	Athlete	Nation	Result	Remark
1st place, gold medalist(s)	1	Wang Yaru	China	22:58.33	PB
2nd place, silver medalist(s)	8	Juste Andrijauskaite	Lithuania	23:55.00	
3rd place, bronze medalist(s)	12	Daryna Kozka	Ukraine	23:58.96	PB
4	4	Sara Alfoldi	Hungary	24:47.07	
5	9	America Yaretzi López Carranza	Mexico	25:31.62	
6	11	Rim Slimi	Tunisia	25:44.20	
7	3	Kristel Alexia Martínez	Guatemala	27:06.24	PB
	10	Rocío Andia	Peru	DQ	TR54.7.5
	5	Rebecca D'Alessandro	Italy	DQ	TR54.7.5
	7	Cecilia Njeri	Kenya	DQ	TR54.7.5

Weather conditions were sunny, with a temperature of 34 °C and humidity of 33%.

DQ = disqualified; PB = personal best; TR = technical rule; ~ = loss of contact; > = bent knee.
