= Taekwondo at the 2026 Summer Youth Olympics – Mixed team =

Mixed team at the IV Summer Youth Olympic Games
- Venue: Complexe Iba Mar Diop
- Date: 12 November
- Competitors: 28 from 7 nations
- Teams: 7

Medalists
1st place, gold medalist(s)		Ahmad Al-Dahamsheh; Laean Al-Rawashdeh; Abdallah Al-Zawahra; Zainab Busila	Jordan
2nd place, silver medalist(s)		İbrahim Efe Düzel; Ercan Berk İmamoğlu; Ayşe Işık; Cansu Şeyhoğlu	Turkey
3rd place, bronze medalist(s)		Guillermo Cortés; Aline Herrera; Jorge Martínez; Vania Mondragón	Mexico

The mixed team competition at the 2026 Summer Youth Olympics was held on 12 November at the Complexe Iba Mar Diop.

== Schedule ==
All times are local (UTC+0).

Date	Time	Round
Thursday, 12 November 2026	11:00; 12:40; 15:00; 16:20; 16:45	Quarterfinals; Semifinals; Repechage; Bronze medal match Gold medal match

== Results ==
Main bracket

Quarterfinals
Jordan	60	55
Senegal	43	46
Tunisia	21	16
Germany	39	19
Mexico	64	26
Turkey	65	43

Semifinals
Jordan	73	77
Saudi Arabia	18	21
Germany	30	20
Turkey	40	36

Gold medal match
Jordan	56	52
Turkey	50	51

Repechage

Repechage
Saudi Arabia	13	10
Mexico	53	32
Germany	25	39
Senegal	17	19

Bronze medal match
Mexico	10	30	24
Germany	7	37	10
