= Cambodia at the 2026 Summer Youth Olympics =

- Flag of Cambodia
- IOC code: CAM
- NOC: National Olympic Committee of Cambodia
- Website: olympiccambodia.com

in Dakar, Senegal October 31, 2026 – November 13, 2026
- Competitors: 4 in 3 sports
- Flag bearers: An Pisey & Sovanphum Thon
- Medals: Gold 0 Silver 0 Bronze 0 Total 0

Summer Youth Olympics appearances
- 2010; 2014; 2018; 2026

Cambodia is scheduled to compete at the 2026 Summer Youth Olympics in Dakar, Senegal from October 31 to November 13, 2026. This will mark Cambodia's fourth appearance at the Youth Olympics, after making its debut in 2010.

Athlete An Pisey and sailor Sovanphum Thon served as the flag bearers for the opening ceremony.

== Competitors ==
The following is the list of number of competitors participating at the Games per sport/discipline.

Sport	Men	Women	Total
Athletics	0	1	1
Sailing	1	0	1
Swimming	1	1	2
Total	2	2	4

== Athletics ==
Cambodia entered one male athlete.

=== Track & road events ===
Women

Athlete	Event	Heat		Semifinal		Final	
Athlete	Event	Result	Rank	Result	Rank	Result	Rank
Pisey An	1500 m						

== Sailing ==
Cambodia entered one male athlete.

Athlete	Event	Opening Series – Points per Race											Total points	Net points	Final rank
Athlete	Event	1	2	3	4	5	6	7	8	9	10	M	Total points	Net points	Final rank
Sovanphum Thon	Men's windsurfing														

== Swimming ==
Cambodia entered two swimmers, one male and one female.

Athlete	Event	Heat		Semifinal		Final	
Athlete	Event	Time	Rank	Time	Rank	Time	Rank
Pieter Sokkha van Oosten	100 m breaststroke						
Pieter Sokkha van Oosten	200 m breaststroke						
Pieter Sokkha van Oosten	50 m butterfly						
Ellen Kalyana van Oosten	50 m freestyle						
Ellen Kalyana van Oosten	50 m backstroke						
Ellen Kalyana van Oosten	50 m breaststroke						
