= Coastal rowing at the 2026 Summer Youth Olympics – Mixed double sculls =

Mixed double sculls at the 2026 Summer Youth Olympics

Mixed double sculls at the 2026 Summer Youth Olympics
- Venue: Saly Beach West
- Dates: 31 October – 2 November 2026
- Competitors: 36 from 18 nations

Medalists
gold medal	Juntao Su; Lili Liu	China
silver medal	Lukas Schoenhuber; Alena Lux	Austria
bronze medal	Elisa Guilloton; Raphael de Boussac	France

The mixed double sculls event at the 2026 Summer Youth Olympics was held at Saly Beach West from 31 October to 2 November 2026.

== Results ==
=== Time trial 1 ===
The top eight crews advanced to the last 16. The remaining crews competed in the second time trial.

Rank	Athlete(s)	Country	Time	Progression
1	Johann Felix Meyer; Carolina Guerra Gonzalez	Germany	2:35.86	Last 16
2	Juntao Su; Lili Liu	China	2:37.57	Last 16
3	Diego Molina Martinez; Blanca Lopez Valera	Spain	2:37.85	Last 16
4	Ondrej Zizka; Marie Zavadilova	(Czech Republic) Czechia	2:38.19	Last 16
5	Mykola Tomchai; Viktoriia Radchenko	Ukraine	2:38.32	Last 16
6	Elisa Guilloton; Raphael de Boussac	France	2:39.13	Last 16
7	Iyed Zantour; Sarra Amari	Tunisia	2:39.73	Last 16
8	Lukas Schoenhuber; Alena Lux	Austria	2:39.80	Last 16
9	Giorgia Cassina; Davide Gazzola	Italy	2:40.73	Time trial 2
10	Alexander Watt; Camilla Griffin	Australia	2:41.21	Time trial 2
11	Trairat Panthong; Thatchaporn Phengsawang	Thailand	2:41.29	Time trial 2
12	Isaac Moos; Allison Grove	United States	2:42.46	Time trial 2
13	Yossuf Moursi; Alia Ali	Egypt	2:43.24	Time trial 2
14	Elif Ozdemir; Zihni Senih Alatas	(Turkey) Türkiye	2:44.57	Time trial 2
15	Chun Cai; Wai Hei Chen	Hong Kong, China	2:45.38	Time trial 2
16	Louie Walker; Lexi Gill	(United Kingdom) Great Britain	2:45.43	Time trial 2
17	Frida Weber Lozano; Enrique Cristiano Morelos Olivares	Mexico	2:50.75	Time trial 2
18	El Hadji Malick Lo; Diadou Cisse	Senegal	3:00.74	Time trial 2

=== Time trial 2 ===
The top eight crews advanced to the last 16. The remaining crews were eliminated.

Rank	Athlete(s)	Country	Time	Result
1	Yossuf Moursi; Alia Ali	Egypt	2:26.51	Advanced
2	Isaac Moos; Allison Grove	United States	2:29.24	Advanced
3	Alexander Watt; Camilla Griffin	Australia	2:30.08	Advanced
4	Zihni Senih Alatas; Elif Ozdemir	(Turkey) Türkiye	2:31.46	Advanced
5	Louie Walker; Lexi Gill	(United Kingdom) Great Britain	2:31.46	Advanced
6	Giorgia Cassina; Davide Gazzola	Italy	2:32.60	Advanced
7	Frida Weber Lozano; Enrique Cristiano Morelos Olivares	Mexico	2:34.12	Advanced
8	Trairat Panthong; Thatchaporn Phengsawang	Thailand	2:34.53	Advanced
9	Chun Cai; Wai Hei Chen	Hong Kong, China	2:36.40	Eliminated ― 17th place
10	El Hadji Malick Lo; Diadou Cisse	Senegal	2:47.38	Eliminated ― 18th place

=== Last 16 ===
The winning crew in each match advanced to the quarter-finals.

Last 16 results
Match	Athlete(s)	Country	Time	Result
1	Johann Felix Meyer; Carolina Guerra Gonzalez	Germany	2:13.42	Advanced
1	Trairat Panthong; Thatchaporn Phengsawang	Thailand	2:27.98	Eliminated
2	Juntao Su; Lili Liu	China	2:16.57	Advanced
2	Frida Weber Lozano; Enrique Cristiano Morelos Olivares	Mexico	2:28.91	Eliminated
3	Diego Molina Martinez; Blanca Lopez Valera	Spain	2:17.91	Advanced
3	Giorgia Cassina; Davide Gazzola	Italy	2:19.46	Eliminated
4	Mykola Tomchai; Viktoriia Radchenko	Ukraine	2:18.38	Advanced
4	Zihni Senih Alatas; Elif Ozdemir	(Turkey) Türkiye	2:43.85	Eliminated
5	Ondrej Zizka; Marie Zavadilova	(Czech Republic) Czechia	2:16.34	Advanced
5	Louie Walker; Lexi Gill	(United Kingdom) Great Britain	2:17.15	Eliminated
6	Elisa Guilloton; Raphael de Boussac	France	2:19.41	Advanced
6	Alexander Watt; Camilla Griffin	Australia	2:21.05	Eliminated
7	Lukas Schoenhuber; Alena Lux	Austria	2:19.26	Advanced
7	Yossuf Moursi; Alia Ali	Egypt	2:21.32	Eliminated
8	Isaac Moos; Allison Grove	United States	2:18.73	Advanced
8	Iyed Zantour; Sarra Amari	Tunisia	2:24.18	Eliminated

=== Quarter-finals ===
The winning crew in each match advanced to the semi-finals.

Quarter-final results
Match	Athlete(s)	Country	Time	Result
1	Lukas Schoenhuber; Alena Lux	Austria	2:13.54	Advanced
1	Johann Felix Meyer; Carolina Guerra Gonzalez	Germany	2:15.80	Eliminated
2	Juntao Su; Lili Liu	China	2:12.44	Advanced
2	Isaac Moos; Allison Grove	United States	2:20.18	Eliminated
3	Elisa Guilloton; Raphael de Boussac	France	2:14.92	Advanced
3	Diego Molina Martinez; Blanca Lopez Valera	Spain	2:16.85	Eliminated
4	Mykola Tomchai; Viktoriia Radchenko	Ukraine	2:14.88	Advanced
4	Ondrej Zizka; Marie Zavadilova	(Czech Republic) Czechia	2:16.34	Eliminated

=== Semi-finals ===
The winning crew in each match advanced to the Gold medal race, while the losing crew advanced to the Bronze medal race.

Semi-final results
Match	Athlete(s)	Country	Time	Result
1	Lukas Schoenhuber; Alena Lux	Austria	2:20.31	Gold medal race
1	Mykola Tomchai; Viktoriia Radchenko	Ukraine	2:24.50	Bronze medal race
2	Juntao Su; Lili Liu	China	2:29.99	Gold medal race
2	Elisa Guilloton; Raphael de Boussac	France	3:01.96	Bronze medal race

=== Final rounds ===
==== Bronze medal race ====
Rank	Athlete(s)	Country	Time	Notes
3rd place, bronze medalist(s)	Elisa Guilloton; Raphael de Boussac	France	2:20.20	
4	Mykola Tomchai; Viktoriia Radchenko	Ukraine	2:20.85	

==== Gold medal race ====
Rank	Athlete(s)	Country	Time	Notes
1st place, gold medalist(s)	Juntao Su; Lili Liu	China	2:22.37	
2nd place, silver medalist(s)	Lukas Schoenhuber; Alena Lux	Austria	2:28.95	

== Final ranking ==
Rank	NOC	Athlete(s)
1st place, gold medalist(s)	People's Republic of China	Juntao Su; Lili Liu
2nd place, silver medalist(s)	Austria	Lukas Schoenhuber; Alena Lux
3rd place, bronze medalist(s)	France	Elisa Guilloton; Raphael de Boussac
4	Ukraine	Mykola Tomchai; Viktoriia Radchenko
5	Spain	Diego Molina Martinez; Blanca Lopez Valera
6	Germany	Johann Felix Meyer; Carolina Guerra Gonzalez
7	(Czech Republic) Czechia	Ondrej Zizka; Marie Zavadilova
8	United States of America	Isaac Moos; Allison Grove
9	Italy	Giorgia Cassina; Davide Gazzola
10	(United Kingdom) Great Britain	Louie Walker; Lexi Gill
11	Tunisia	Iyed Zantour; Sarra Amari
12	Egypt	Yossuf Moursi; Alia Ali
13	Australia	Alexander Watt; Camilla Griffin
14	Thailand	Trairat Panthong; Thatchaporn Phengsawang
15	Mexico	Frida Weber Lozano; Enrique Cristiano Morelos Olivares
16	(Turkey) Turkiye	Zihni Senih Alatas; Elif Ozdemir
17	Hong Kong, China	Chun Cai; Wai Hei Chen
18	Senegal	El Hadji Malick Lo; Diadou Cisse
