= Beach wrestling at the 2026 Summer Youth Olympics –Girl's 75 kg =

Girl's 75 kg at the IV Summer Youth Olympic Games
- Venue: Saly Beach West
- Date: 7 November 2026
- Competitors: 12 from 12 nations

Medalists
1st place, gold medalist(s)		Zhao Min; China
2nd place, silver medalist(s)		Taniya Taniya; India
3rd place, bronze medalist(s)		Matilda Ann Hruby; United States

The Girl's 75 kg competition in beach wrestling at the 2026 Summer Youth Olympics was held on 7 November 2026 at Saly Beach West.

== Competition format ==
The competition was contested under the beach wrestling rules. Twelve wrestlers were divided into three groups of four athletes each. The wrestlers competed in a round-robin format within their respective groups. The group winners and the best second-placed wrestler advanced to the semifinals. The semifinal winners competed in the gold-medal match, while the semifinal losers contested the bronze-medal match.

== Schedule ==
All times are in local time (UTC−3).

Date	Time	Round
Saturday, 7 November 2026	10:30	Group stage
Saturday, 7 November 2026	15:00	Semifinals
Saturday, 7 November 2026	15:00	Medal matches

== Results ==
Legend

- F — Won by fall
- WO — Won by walkover

=== Notes ===
- LIGHT and DARK indicate the assigned colours of the wrestlers in each bout.
- Technical points represent the points scored by each wrestler during a match.
- Classification points are awarded according to the match result and are used to determine the group standings.
- Q – Qualified for the semifinals as the group winner.
- q – Qualified for the semifinals as the best second-placed wrestler across all groups.

==== Results codes ====
Code	Meaning
VSU	Victory with 3 points, without a 3-point takedown or throw, and without any points scored by the opponent.
VSU1	Victory with 3 points, without a 3-point takedown or throw, but with points scored by the opponent.
VFA	Victory by a 3-point takedown or throw, without any points scored by the opponent.
VFA1	Victory by a 3-point takedown or throw, with points scored by the opponent.
VIN	Victory by injury.
VPO	Victory with less than 3 points.

=== Group stage ===
==== Group A ====
Round	Match number	Colour	Athlete	NOC	Technical points	Classification points	Results code
1	31	LIGHT	Zhao Min	China	3	2	VSU1
1	31	DARK	Kata Seregi	Serbia	1	1	VSU1
1	32	LIGHT	Maria José Paz Rangel	Mexico	0	0	VSU
1	32	DARK	Ester Noemi Oyola Londono	Venezuela	3	2	VSU
2	43	LIGHT	Zhao Min	China	3	2	VSU
2	43	DARK	Maria José Paz Rangel	Mexico	0	0	VSU
2	44	LIGHT	Kata Seregi	Serbia	0	0	VSU
2	44	DARK	Ester Noemi Oyola Londono	Venezuela	3	2	VSU
3	79	LIGHT	Zhao Min	China	3	2	VSU
3	79	DARK	Ester Noemi Oyola Londono	Venezuela	0	0	VSU
3	80	LIGHT	Kata Seregi	Serbia	2	1	VPO
3	80	DARK	Maria José Paz Rangel	Mexico	1	0	VPO

Rank	Athlete	NOC code	Matches won	Classification points	Technical points scored	Technical points conceded	Draw number	Qualification
1	Zhao Min	China	3	6	9	1	12	Q
2	Ester Noemi Oyola Londono	Venezuela	2	4	6	3	250	
3	Kata Seregi	Serbia	1	2	3	7	48	
4	Maria José Paz Rangel	Mexico	0	0	1	8	57	

==== Group B ====
Round	Match number	Colour	Athlete	NOC code	Technical points	Classification points	Results code
1	33	LIGHT	Taniya Taniya	India	3	2	VSU1
1	33	DARK	Mia Bauer	Germany	1	1	VSU1
1	34	LIGHT	Vasiliki Karavanou	Greece	0	0	VSU
1	34	DARK	Merily Vaester	Estonia	3	2	VSU
2	45	LIGHT	Taniya Taniya	India	3	2	VSU
2	45	DARK	Vasiliki Karavanou	Greece	0	0	VSU
2	46	LIGHT	Mia Bauer	Germany	3	4	VFA1
2	46	DARK	Merily Vaester	Estonia	1	1	VFA1
3	81	LIGHT	Taniya Taniya	India	4	2	VSU1
3	81	DARK	Merily Vaester	Estonia	1	1	VSU1
3	82	LIGHT	Mia Bauer	Germany	0	1	VIN
3	82	DARK	Vasiliki Karavanou	Greece	0	0	VIN

Rank	Athlete	NOC code	Matches won	Classification points	Technical points scored	Technical points conceded	Draw number	Qualification
1	Taniya Taniya	India	3	6	10	2	13	Q
2	Mia Bauer	Germany	2	6	4	4	44	
3	Merily Vaester	Estonia	1	4	5	7	233	
4	Vasiliki Karavanou	Greece	0	0	0	6	75	

==== Group C ====
Round	Match number	Colour	Athlete	NOC code	Technical points	Classification points	Results code
1	35	LIGHT	Matilda Ann Hruby	United States	3	2	VSU
1	35	DARK	Elisabeth Ebedo Diatta	Senegal	0	0	VSU
1	36	LIGHT	Inaya Lahssini	Morocco	0	0	VSU
1	36	DARK	Duné van Zyl	South Africa	3	2	VSU
2	47	LIGHT	Matilda Ann Hruby	United States	3	4	VFA
2	47	DARK	Inaya Lahssini	Morocco	0	0	VFA
2	48	LIGHT	Elisabeth Ebedo Diatta	Senegal	5	4	VFA1
2	48	DARK	Duné van Zyl	South Africa	1	1	VFA1
3	83	LIGHT	Matilda Ann Hruby	United States	5	4	VFA
3	83	DARK	Duné van Zyl	South Africa	0	0	VFA
3	84	LIGHT	Elisabeth Ebedo Diatta	Senegal	3	2	VSU1
3	84	DARK	Inaya Lahssini	Morocco	1	1	VSU1

Rank	Athlete	NOC code	Matches won	Classification points	Technical points scored	Technical points conceded	Draw number	Qualification
1	Matilda Ann Hruby	United States	3	10	11	0	33	Q
2	Elisabeth Ebedo Diatta	Senegal	2	6	8	5	43	q
3	Duné van Zyl	South Africa	1	3	4	10	222	
4	Inaya Lahssini	Morocco	0	1	1	9	216	

=== Finals ===
Semifinals
1	Taniya Taniya (IND)	3
4	Matilda Ann Hruby (USA)	1
3	Zhao Min (CHN)	3
2	Elisabeth Ebedo Diatta (SEN)	0

Final
Taniya Taniya (IND)	1
Zhao Min (CHN)	2

Bronze-medal match
Matilda Ann Hruby (USA)	3
Elisabeth Ebedo Diatta (SEN)	2
