= Peru at the 2026 Summer Youth Olympics =

- Flag of Peru
- IOC code: PER
- NOC: Peruvian Olympic Committee
- Website: www.coperu.org

in Dakar, Senegal October 31, 2026 – November 13, 2026
- Competitors: 15 in 11 sports
- Flag bearers: Natzumi Aquije & Domenico Sotomayor
- Medals: Gold 0 Silver 0 Bronze 0 Total 0

Summer Youth Olympics appearances
- 2010; 2014; 2018; 2026

Peru is competed at the 2026 Summer Youth Olympics in Dakar, Senegal from October 31 to November 13, 2026. This was Peru's fourth appearance at the Youth Olympics, after making its debut in 2010.

Table tennis player Natzumi Aquije and swimmer Domenico Sotomayor served as the flag bearers for the opening ceremony.

== Competitors ==
The following is the list of number of competitors participating at the Games per sport/discipline.

Sport	Men	Women	Total
Athletics	1	1	2
Beach wrestling	0	1	1
Coastal rowing	1	0	1
Fencing	0	1	1
Judo	1	0	1
Road cycling	0	1	1
Sailing	1	1	2
Skateboarding	1	0	1
Swimming	1	1	2
Taekwondo	0	1	1
Table tennis	1	1	2
Total	7	8	15

== Athletics ==
Peru entered two athletes, one male and one female.

=== Track & road events ===
Men

Athlete	Event	Heat		Semifinal		Final	
Athlete	Event	Result	Rank	Result	Rank	Result	Rank
Thiago Goyzueta	2000 m steeplechase	—N/a				5:46.79	5

Women

Athlete	Event	Heat		Semifinal		Final	
Athlete	Event	Result	Rank	Result	Rank	Result	Rank
Rocío Andia	5000 m race walk	—N/a				DQ	

== Beach wrestling ==
Peru entered one female athlete.

Women

Athlete	Weight	Group Stage				Seminfinals	Final / BM	
Athlete	Weight	Opposition Result	Opposition Result	Opposition Result	Rank	Opposition Result	Opposition Result	Rank
Stacy Rodríguez	-55 kg	Kaydie Star (NRO); W 0–3	Madalina Margareta Pavel (ROU); W 1–3	Reisa Kojima (JPN); L 3–0	2	Did not advance		6

== Coastal rowing ==
Peru entered one male rower.

Men

Athlete	Event	Qualifying round				Round of 16	Quarterfinals	Semifinals	Final / BM	
Athlete	Event	Time Trial 1	Position	Time Trial 2	Position	Opposition Time	Opposition Time	Opposition Time	Opposition Time	Rank
Teo Rubio	Solo	2:51.69	18	2:37.96	10	Did not advance				18

== Fencing ==
Peru entered one female athlete.

Athlete	Event	Pool Round							Round of 16	Quarterfinal	Semifinal	Final / BM	
Athlete	Event	Opposition Score	Opposition Score	Opposition Score	Opposition Score	Opposition Score	Opposition Score	Rank	Opposition Score	Opposition Score	Opposition Score	Opposition Score	Rank
Astrid Bravo	Women's épée	Kouassi (CIV); W 4–5	Nikolajeva (EST); W 5–2	Dmytruka (UKR); L 3–5	Horvath (HUN); L 5–1	Makenaa (KEN); W 3–5	Venturas (RSA); W 5–2	3	Makenaa (KEN); W 15–2	Al Sharji (OMA); L 13–15	Did not advance		5

== Judo ==
Peru entered one male judoka based on the available quotas assigned by the International Judo Federation.

Men

Athlete	Event	Round of 16	Quarterfinals	Semifinals	Repechage 1	Repechage 2	Final / BM	
Athlete	Event	Opposition Result	Opposition Result	Opposition Result	Opposition Result	Opposition Result	Opposition Result	Rank
Yesus Perea	-66 kg	Diop (SEN); L 0–110	Did not advance		Fidalgo (CPV); W 100–0	Diop (SEN); L 0–100	Did not advance	7

== Road cycling ==
Peru entered one female athlete.

Women

Athlete	Event	Time	Rank
Haru Quinto	Road race	1:31:19	9
Haru Quinto	Time trial	12:57.00	21

== Sailing ==
Peru entered two athletes, one male and one female.

Athlete	Event	Opening Series – Points per Race														Total points	Net points	Final rank
Athlete	Event	1	2	3	4	5	6	7	8	9	10	11	12	13	M	Total points	Net points	Final rank
Salvador Tenorio	Men's windsurfing	17	21	19	13	18	13	9	10	10	10	10	17	15	13	195		13
Paula Ledgard	Women's windsurfing	19	13	15	21	14	15	14	13	13	13	17	9	16	21	213		16

== Skateboarding ==
Peru entered one male athlete based on available quotas.

Athlete	Event	Heat		Final	
Athlete	Event	Result	Rank	Result	Rank
Jacen Yactayo	Men's street	93.85	11	Did not advance	

== Swimming ==
Peru entered two swimmers, one male and one female.

Athlete	Event	Heat		Final	
Athlete	Event	Time	Rank	Time	Rank
Domenico Sotomayor	200 m freestyle	1:53.17	8 Q	1:52.80	6
Domenico Sotomayor	400 m freestyle	—N/a		4:01.40	10
Domenico Sotomayor	800 m freestyle	Cancelled			
Cielo Moya	50 m freestyle	27.94	25	—N/a	
Cielo Moya	100 m freestyle	1:00.35	24	—N/a	
Cielo Moya	50 m backstroke	Did not start			
Cielo Moya	50 m butterfly	28.13	7 Q	28.18	7

== Taekwondo ==
Peru entered one female athlete.

Women

Athlete	Event	Round of 16	Quarterfinals	Semifinals	Repechage	Final / BM	
Athlete	Event	Opposition Result	Opposition Result	Opposition Result	Opposition Result	Opposition Result	Rank
Ximena Zapata	-63 kg	Bye	Toure (SEN); L 2–0	Did not advance			5

== Table tennis ==
Peru entered two athletes (one male and one female).

Singles

Athlete	Event	Preeliminary			Group position	Round of 16	Quarterfinals	Semifinals	Final / BM	
Athlete	Event	Round 1	Round 2	Round 3	Group position	Round of 16	Quarterfinals	Semifinals	Final / BM	
Athlete	Event	Opposition Result	Opposition Result	Opposition Result	Group position	Opposition Result	Opposition Result	Opposition Result	Opposition Result	Rank
Samuel Duffoo	Men's singles	Vitel (FRA) L 3–0 (9-11, 11-2, 12-10, 11-6)	Lobo Diaz (CRC) W 1–3 (13-11, 7-11, 8-11, 5-11)	Otalvaro (COL) L 3–0 (11-3, 11-4, 11-5)	3	Did not advance				17
Natzumi Aquije	Women's singles	Kashyap (ANT); L 3–0 (11-7, 11-6, 11-9)	Borges (BRA); L 3–1 (7-11, 11-8, 12-10, 12-10)	Matsushima (JPN); L 3–0 (11-7, 11-5, 11-1)	4	Did not advance				25

Mixed

Athletes	Event	Round of 32	Round of 16	Quarterfinals	Semifinals	Final / BM	
Athletes	Event	Opposition Result	Opposition Result	Opposition Result	Opposition Result	Opposition Result	Rank
Samuel Duffoo; Natsumi Aquije	Mixed doubles	Zyworonek (POL) Rajkowska (POL); L 0–3 (8-11, 4-11, 8-11)	Did not advance				17
