= Beach wrestling at the 2026 Summer Youth Olympics – Women's 45 kg =

Wrestling event at the 2026 Summer Youth Olympics

Women's 45 kg at the 2026 Summer Youth Olympics
- Venue: Saly Beach West
- Date: 8 November 2026
- Competitors: 12 from 12 nations

Medalists
gold medal	Ndeye Anna Diatta	Senegal
silver medal	Karen Rios Silva	Mexico
bronze medal	Valery Rubio Torres	Colombia

The women's 45 kg competition in beach wrestling at the 2026 Summer Youth Olympics was held on 8 November 2026 at Saly Beach West in Saly, Senegal. Twelve wrestlers from twelve National Olympic Committees competed in the event.

Senegal's Ndeye Anna Diatta won the gold medal, defeating Mexico's Karen Rios Silva in the final. Valery Rubio Torres of Colombia won bronze.

== Competition format ==
The 12 wrestlers were divided into three groups of four. Wrestlers competed in a round-robin format within their groups. The winner of each group and the best second-placed wrestler advanced to the semifinals. The semifinal winners competed for the gold medal, while the semifinal losers competed for the bronze medal.

== Schedule ==
All times are local (UTC−3).

Date	Event
8 November 2026	Group stage, semifinals and medal matches

== Results ==
=== Legend ===
- Q – Qualified for semifinals as group winner
- q – Qualified for semifinals as best second-placed wrestler

=== Results codes ===
Code	Meaning
VFA	Victory by a 3-point takedown or throw, without any point scored by the opponent
VFA1	Victory by a 3-point takedown or throw, with point(s) scored by the opponent
VIN	Victory by injury
VPO	Victory with less than 3 points
VSU	Victory with 3 points but without a 3-point takedown or throw, without any point scored by the opponent
VSU1	Victory with 3 points but without a 3-point takedown or throw, with point(s) scored by the opponent

=== Group stage ===
==== Group A ====
Match	Wrestler	NOC	Technical points	Classification points	Result
95	Claudia Flores	Honduras	0	0	VIN
95	Thi Hong Lo	Vietnam	2	1	VIN
96	Nomenjanahary Francia Randriatiana	Madagascar	1	1	VSU1
96	Ndeye Khady Anna Diatta	Senegal	3	2	VSU1
107	Claudia Flores	Honduras	0	0	VIN
107	Nomenjanahary Francia Randriatiana	Madagascar	0	1	VIN
108	Thi Hong Lo	Vietnam	0	0	VSU
108	Ndeye Khady Anna Diatta	Senegal	3	2	VSU
143	Claudia Flores	Honduras	0	0	VIN
143	Ndeye Khady Anna Diatta	Senegal	0	1	VIN
144	Thi Hong Lo	Vietnam	3	2	VSU
144	Nomenjanahary Francia Randriatiana	Madagascar	0	0	VSU

Rank	Wrestler	NOC	Matches won	Classification points	Technical points scored	Technical points conceded	Draw number	Qualification
1	Ndeye Khady Anna Diatta	Senegal	3	5	6	1	255	Q
2	Thi Hong Lo	Vietnam	2	3	5	3	105	
3	Nomenjanahary Francia Randriatiana	Madagascar	1	2	1	6	111	
4	Claudia Flores	Honduras	0	0	0	2	11	

==== Group B ====
Match	Wrestler	NOC	Technical points	Classification points	Result
97	Victoria Rivera Diaz	Puerto Rico	0	0	VSU
97	Meriem Safiya Grib	Algeria	3	2	VSU
98	Emilie Bastide	France	1	1	VSU1
98	Piper Fry	United States	3	2	VSU1
109	Victoria Rivera Diaz	Puerto Rico	2	1	VFA1
109	Emilie Bastide	France	5	4	VFA1
110	Meriem Safiya Grib	Algeria	4	2	VSU1
110	Piper Fry	United States	1	1	VSU1
145	Victoria Rivera Diaz	Puerto Rico	0	0	VPO
145	Piper Fry	United States	2	1	VPO
146	Meriem Safiya Grib	Algeria	3	2	VSU1
146	Emilie Bastide	France	1	1	VSU1

Rank	Wrestler	NOC	Matches won	Classification points	Technical points scored	Technical points conceded	Draw number	Qualification
1	Meriem Safiya Grib	Algeria	3	6	10	2	76	Q
2	Piper Fry	United States	2	4	6	5	182	
3	Emilie Bastide	France	1	6	7	8	146	
4	Victoria Rivera Diaz	Puerto Rico	0	1	2	10	12	

==== Group C ====
Match	Wrestler	NOC	Technical points	Classification points	Result
99	Karen Araceli Rios Silva	Mexico	3	4	VFA
99	Kristin Iliyna	Bulgaria	0	0	VFA
100	Valery Edith Rubio Torres	Colombia	3	2	VSU
100	N Name Brem	Guinea-Bissau	0	0	VSU
111	Karen Araceli Rios Silva	Mexico	3	2	VSU1
111	Valery Edith Rubio Torres	Colombia	1	1	VSU1
112	Kristin Iliyna	Bulgaria	1	1	VSU1
112	N Name Brem	Guinea-Bissau	3	2	VSU1
147	Karen Araceli Rios Silva	Mexico	4	2	VSU1
147	N Name Brem	Guinea-Bissau	2	1	VSU1
148	Kristin Iliyna	Bulgaria	0	0	VFA
148	Valery Edith Rubio Torres	Colombia	5	4	VFA

Rank	Wrestler	NOC	Matches won	Classification points	Technical points scored	Technical points conceded	Draw number	Qualification
1	Karen Araceli Rios Silva	Mexico	3	8	10	3	45	Q
2	Valery Edith Rubio Torres	Colombia	2	7	9	3	150	q
3	N Name Brem	Guinea-Bissau	1	3	5	8	176	
4	Kristin Iliyna	Bulgaria	0	1	1	11	73	

=== Finals ===
Semifinals
1	Ndeye Khady Anna Diatta (SEN)	4
4	Valery Edith Rubio Torres (COL)	0
3	Meriem Safiya Grib (ALG)	1
2	Karen Araceli Rios Silva (MEX)	5

Final
Ndeye Khady Anna Diatta (SEN)	3
Karen Araceli Rios Silva (MEX)	1

Bronze-medal match
Valery Edith Rubio Torres (COL)	4
Meriem Safiya Grib (ALG)	0

=== Final classification ===
Rank	Wrestler	NOC
1	Ndeye Anna Diatta	Senegal
2	Karen Rios Silva	Mexico
3	Valery Rubio Torres	Colombia
4	Meriem Safiya Grib	Algeria
5	Piper Fry	United States
6	Thi Hong Lo	Vietnam
7	Emilie Bastide	France
8	N Name Brem	Guinea-Bissau
9	Nomenjanahary Francia Randriatiana	Madagascar
10	Victoria Rivera Diaz	Puerto Rico
11	Kristin Iliyna	Bulgaria
12	Claudia Flores	Honduras
