= Athletics at the 2026 Summer Youth Olympics – Women's hammer throw =

Women's hammer throw athletics event at the 2026 Summer Youth Olympics

Women's hammer throw at the IV Summer Youth Olympic Games
- Venue: Complexe Iba Mar Diop
- Date: 10 November
- Competitors: 8 from 8 nations
- Winning time: 71.27 m

Medalists
1st place, gold medalist(s)		Milaniia Kokhan	Ukraine
2nd place, silver medalist(s)		Xingyue Yang	China
3rd place, bronze medalist(s)		Alison Aylin Salinas Espino	Mexico

The women's hammer throw event at the 2026 Summer Youth Olympics was held at the Complexe Iba Mar Diop on 10 November 2026.

== Schedule ==
All times are local (UTC±0).

Date	Time	Round
10 November 2026	16:30	Final

== Results ==
=== Final ===
The final was held from 16:30 to 17:32. Milaniia Kokhan of Ukraine won the gold medal with a throw of 71.27 metres, setting a personal best.

Rank	Athlete	NOC	1	2	3	4	5	6	Result	Notes
1st place, gold medalist(s)	Milaniia Kokhan	Ukraine	70.71	x	69.70	70.55	71.27	66.97	71.27	PB
2nd place, silver medalist(s)	Xingyue Yang	China	62.76	x	x	59.57	65.96	x	65.96	
3rd place, bronze medalist(s)	Alison Aylin Salinas Espino	Mexico	58.10	60.14	59.94	61.19	58.34	61.52	61.52	
4	Clara Teixeira	Portugal	36.13	57.98	59.48	x	54.74	57.47	59.48	
5	Mariem Elgamal	Egypt	x	x	53.61	x	54.28	52.01	54.28	PB
6	Aya Amrane	Algeria	x	x	x	54.18	x	x	54.18	
7	Kenielys Lopez	Puerto Rico	47.06	x	47.59	46.00	47.41	48.89	48.89	PB
8	Soe San Su Pyae Pyae	Myanmar	36.16	32.42	32.79	32.43	x	34.03	36.16	PB
