= Myanmar at the 2026 Summer Youth Olympics =

- IOC code: MYA
- NOC: Myanmar Olympic Committee

in Dakar, Senegal 31 October – 13 November 2026
- Competitors: 2 in 1 sport
- Medals: Gold 0 Silver 0 Bronze 0 Total 0

Summer Youth Olympics appearances
- 2010; 2014; 2018; 2026

Myanmar is scheduled to compete at the 2026 Summer Youth Olympics in Dakar, Senegal, from 31 October to 13 November 2026. This will be the nation's fourth appearance at the Summer Youth Olympic Games.

As the Myanmar did not sent a flagbearer, a Dakar 2026 volunteer took over the role during the opening ceremony.

== Competitors ==
Sport	Men	Women	Total
Athletics	1	1	2
Total	1	1	2

== Athletics ==
Myanmar qualified two athletes in field throwing events.

Field events

Athlete	Event	Stage 1		Stage 2		Final placing	
Athlete	Event	Result	Rank	Result	Rank	Result	Rank
Blu Moo Saw Taw	Men's hammer throw						
Su Pyae Pyae Soe San	Women's hammer throw						
