= Athletics at the 2026 Summer Youth Olympics – Men's 2000 metres steeplechase =

Athletics event at the 2026 Summer Youth Olympics

Men's 2000 metres steeplechase at the IV Summer Youth Olympic Games
- Venue: Complexe Iba Mar Diop
- Dates: 9 November 2026
- Competitors: 13 from 13 nations

Medalists
1st place, gold medalist(s)		Junedin Abdo	Ethiopia
2nd place, silver medalist(s)		Wesley Kiplagat Kipkech	Kenya
3rd place, bronze medalist(s)		Michael Kibet	Uganda

The men's 2000 metres steeplechase event at the 2026 Summer Youth Olympics was held on 9 November at the Complexe Iba Mar Diop in Dakar, Senegal. Ethiopia's Junedin Abdo won in a time of 5:29.30.

The competition consisted of a single phase, the final, in accordance with the athletics competition format.

== Schedule ==
The official competition schedule listed the men's 2000 metres steeplechase final for 9 November 2026 at 14:46 local time.

All times are local (UTC).

Date	Time	Round
9 November 2026	14:46	Final

== Results ==
=== Final ===
The final was held on 9 November 2026. The results sheet recorded personal bests for the first three finishers.

Rank	Bib	Athlete	Nation	Result	Remark
1st place, gold medalist(s)	362	Junedin Abdo	Ethiopia	5:29.30	PB
2nd place, silver medalist(s)	398	Wesley Kiplagat Kipkech	Kenya	5:36.28	PB
3rd place, bronze medalist(s)	486	Michael Kibet	Uganda	5:39.50	PB
4	360	Pablo Vázquez	Spain	5:46.05	
5	436	Thiago Goyzueta	Peru	5:46.79	PB
6	479	Ayham Sayahi	Tunisia	5:47.28	PB
7	415	Mauricio de Jesús Camacho Briseño	Mexico	5:50.80	PB
8	410	Youssef Abdoussi	Morocco	5:54.24	
9	351	Saleh Mahmoud	Egypt	5:56.83	PB
10	383	Ido Noam	Israel	5:59.19	
11	389	Simon Scardi	Italy	6:10.01	
12	381	Mohammad Alidoosti	Iran	6:26.60	
13	492	Rabea Alsarari	Yemen	6:34.11	PB
