= Gabon at the 2026 Summer Youth Olympics =

- Flag of Gabon
- IOC code: GAB
- NOC: Comité Olympique Gabonais

in Dakar, Senegal October 31, 2026 – November 13, 2026
- Competitors: 7 in 5 sports
- Flag bearers: Tracy Assengone & Ozavino Ngaka
- Medals: Gold 0 Silver 0 Bronze 0 Total 0

Summer Youth Olympics appearances
- 2010; 2014; 2018; 2026

Gabon is scheduled to compete at the 2026 Summer Youth Olympics in Dakar, Senegal from October 31 to November 13, 2026. This will mark Gabon's fourth appearance at the Youth Olympics, after making its debut in 2010.

Wushu taolu athlete Tracy Assengone and swimmer Ozavino Ngaka served as the flag bearers for the opening ceremony.

== Competitors ==
The following is the list of number of competitors participating at the Games per sport/discipline.

Sport	Men	Women	Total
Athletics	0	1	1
Judo	1	0	1
Swimming	1	1	2
Taekwondo	1	1	2
Wushu	0	1	1
Total	3	4	7

== Athletics ==
Gabon entered one female athlete.

=== Track & road events ===
Women

Athlete	Event	Heat		Semifinal		Final	
Athlete	Event	Result	Rank	Result	Rank	Result	Rank
Grace Massala	100 m						

== Judo ==
Gabon entered one male judoka based on the available quotas assigned by the International Judo Federation.

Men

Athlete	Event	Round of 16	Quarterfinals	Semifinals	Repechage 1	Repechage 2	Final	
Athlete	Event	Opposition Result	Opposition Result	Opposition Result	Opposition Result	Opposition Result	Opposition Result	Rank
Ghyslain Ndong	–100 kg							

== Swimming ==
Gabon entered two swimmers, one of each gender.

Athlete	Event	Heat		Final	
Athlete	Event	Time	Rank	Time	Rank
Ozavino Ngaka	50 m freestyle				
Ozavino Ngaka	50 m breaststroke				
Ozavino Ngaka	50 m butterfly				
Axelle Moulenda	200 m breaststroke				

== Taekwondo ==
Gabon entered two athletes, one of each gender.

Men

Athlete	Event	Round of 16	Quarterfinals	Semifinals	Repechage	Final / BM	
Athlete	Event	Opposition Result	Opposition Result	Opposition Result	Opposition Result	Opposition Result	Rank
Claude Boulouchi	-73 kg	Bye					

Women

Athlete	Event	Round of 16	Quarterfinals	Semifinals	Repechage	Final / BM	
Athlete	Event	Opposition Result	Opposition Result	Opposition Result	Opposition Result	Opposition Result	Rank
Iguewa Kowengue	-55 kg	Bye					

== Wushu ==
Gabon entered one female athlete after quotas were assigned by the International Wushu Federation.

Athlete	Event	Changquan routine		Gunshu routine		Total Points	Final Rank
Athlete	Event	Points	Rank	Points	Rank	Total Points	Final Rank
Tracy Assengone	Women's changquan combined						
