= Finland at the 2026 Summer Youth Olympics =

- IOC code: FIN
- NOC: Finnish Olympic Committee
- Website: https://www.olympiakomitea.fi/

in Dakar, Senegal October 31, 2026 – November 13, 2026
- Competitors: 4 in 4 sports
- Medals: Gold 0 Silver 0 Bronze 0 Total 0

Summer Youth Olympics appearances
- 2010; 2014; 2018; 2026

Finland is scheduled to compete at the 2026 Summer Youth Olympics in Dakar, Senegal from October 31 to November 13, 2026. This will mark Finland's fourth appearance at the Youth Olympics, after making its debut in 2010.

== Competitors ==
The following is the list of number of competitors participating at the Games per sport/discipline.

Sport	Men	Women	Total
Badminton	0	1	1
Boxing	1	0	1
Coastal rowing	0	1	1
Taekwondo	0	1	1
Total	1	3	4

== Badminton ==
Finland received a quota place for the boys' tournament.

Athlete	Event
Ananya Kandala	Girls' tournament

== Boxing ==
Finland received a quota place in the competition for boys below 55 kg.

Athlete	Event
Mike Parhiala	below 55 kg

== Coastal rowing ==
Finland received a quota place for the girls' Solo C1x.

Athlete	Event	Time	Rank
Saaga Hakala	Girls' Solo C1x		

== Taekwondo ==
Finland received a quota place in the competition for girls below 49 kg.

Athlete	Event
Aina Kirtselis	Girls' - 49 kg
