= Guinea-Bissau at the 2026 Summer Youth Olympics =

- Flag of Guinea-Bissau
- IOC code: GBS
- NOC: Guinea-Bissau Olympic Committee
- Website: www.cogb.gw

in Dakar, Senegal October 31, 2026 – November 13, 2026
- Competitors: 4 in 3 sports
- Flag bearers: Name Brem & Kido Ales
- Medals: Gold 0 Silver 0 Bronze 0 Total 0

Summer Youth Olympics appearances
- 2010; 2014; 2018; 2026

Guinea-Bissau is scheduled to compete at the 2026 Summer Youth Olympics in Dakar, Senegal from October 31 to November 13, 2026. This will mark Guinea-Bissau's fourth appearance at the Youth Olympics, after making its debut in 2010.

Beach wrestler Name Brem and athlete Kido Ales served as the flag bearers for the opening ceremony.

== Competitors ==
The following is the list of number of competitors participating at the Games per sport/discipline.

Sport	Men	Women	Total
Athletics	1	1	2
Beach wrestling	0	1	1
Swimming	1	0	1
Total	2	2	4

== Athletics ==
Guinea-Bissau entered two athletes, one of each gender.

=== Track & road events ===
Men

Athlete	Event	Semifinal		Final	
Athlete	Event	Result	Rank	Result	Rank
Kido Ales	200 m				

Women

Athlete	Event	Semifinal		Final	
Athlete	Event	Result	Rank	Result	Rank
Aminata Balde	100 m				

== Beach wrestling ==
Guinea-Bissau entered one female athlete.

Women

Team	Event	Group stage				Semifinals	Final / BM	
Team	Event	Opposition Result	Opposition Result	Opposition Result	Rank	Opposition Result	Opposition Result	Rank
Name Brem	–45 kg							

== Swimming ==
Guinea-Bissau entered one male swimmer.

Athlete	Event	Heat		Final	
Athlete	Event	Time	Rank	Time	Rank
Djani Cá	50 m freestyle				
Djani Cá	50 m breaststroke				
Djani Cá	50 m butterfly				
