= Liu Lili =

Chinese cyclist

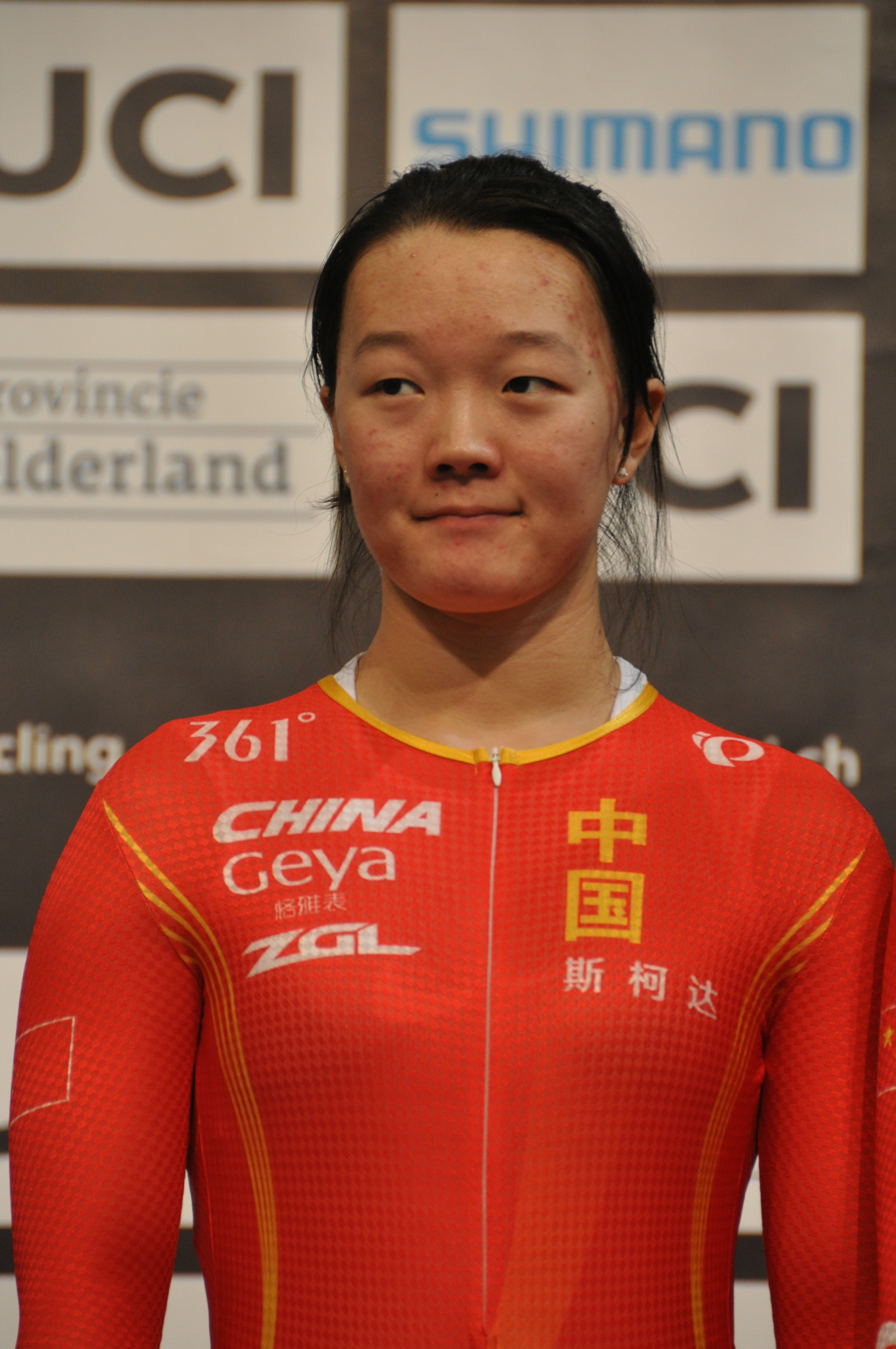
- Liu Lili in 2016

Personal information
- Born: 25 December 1994 (age 31)

Cycling career
- Sport: Cycling
- Discipline: Track cycling

Liu Lili (born 25 December 1994) is a Chinese female track cyclist, representing China at international competitions. During the 2016–17 UCI Track Cycling World Cup she won in the team sprint at round one in Glasgow the silver medal in at round two in Apeldoorn the bronze medal.

== Career results ==
2014
Hong Kong International Track Cup

2nd Team Pursuit (with Han Cuiping, He Junyao and Xing Feixue)
3rd 500m Time Trial

2016

Japan Track Cup
3rd Sprint
3rd Sprint

3rd Sprint, China Track Cup
