= Arianna Robinson =

American basketball player (born 2010)

Personal information
- Born: June 22, 2010 (age 16) Texas, U.S.
- Listed height: 5 ft 10 in (1.78 m)

Career information
- High school: Plano East Senior High School (Plano, Texas)
- Position: Guard

Career highlights
- FIBA USA Women's U17 National Team (2026): gold medalist; USA Women's U17 National Team (2026); FIBA USA Girls U16 Women's AmeriCup gold medalist (2025); USA Women's U16 National Team (2025); Dallas Morning News All-Area Player of the Year; District 6-6A Offensive Player of the Year

Arianna Abidhiteunwo Oluwatosin Robinson (born June 22, 2010) is an American basketball player.

== Early life and family ==
Arianna is a Nigerian American of Ekpeye origin, born to Robert O. Robinson and Onome Robinson. Her late grandfather Robinson O. Robinson was the Eze Ekpeye Logbo II of Ekpeye kingdom.

Robinson developed her game in the Dallas–Fort Worth area, and became a nationally recognized youth player through grassroots competition with Dallas area club teams. Her performances at elite showcases and camps established her as one of the premier guards in the country.

== Career ==
As a freshman (2024–25) Robinson averaged approximately 20.3 points, 7.4 rebounds and 3.1 steals per game. She led Plano East to a historic run to the UIL Class 6A state semifinals, and was named District 6-6A Offensive Player of the Year and Dallas Morning News All-Area Girls Basketball Player of the Year.

As a sophomore (2025–26), she continued as one of Texas' top players, became Plano East's all-time leading scorer, and remained a nationally ranked prospect.

Playing for Plano East, Robinson was named 6-6A MVP while also being voted to the Texas Association of Basketball Coaches' all-region and all-state teams and earning a unanimous pick as Star Local Media's all-area offensive player of the year.

Internationally, Robinson helped the USA Women's U16 national team win gold at the 2025 FIBA U16 Women's Americup, averaging 9.7 points in a bench role. In May 2026, she was listed as a 2020 USA Women's U17 national basketball team. She is considered a top-10 prospect for 2028 in the state of Texas, and has received offers from Iowa, Oklahoma State and over 60 universities and colleges across the world.

Robinson was selected to the 2025 USA Women's U16 National Team after national trials. She helped Team USA win the FIBA U16 Women's AmeriCup gold medal, in Mexico. In 2026, she earned selection to the USA Women's U17 National Team, and helped team USA with the FIBA U17 Women's World Basketball Championship in Czech Republic.

She has competed in grassroots basketball and plays for CyFair Elite on the Nike EYBL circuit. She has participated in national showcase events, including Overtime Select, and was ranked among the Class of 2028 by recruiting outlets such as ESPN, Prep Girls Hoops, and MaxPreps.

Robinson is a 5-foot-10 guard. Scouting services including ESPN and Prep Girls Hoops have described her as a three-level scorer and playmaker, while highlighting her defensive versatility, poise, and ability to impact the game on both ends of the floor.

She has been featured by USA Basketball, ESPN, Prep Girls Hoops, and regional media for her performances in high school basketball and with United States national youth teams.

=== Career statistics ===
High school

- 2024–25: 20.3 points, 7.4 rebounds and 3.1 steals per game

International

- 2025 FIBA U16 Women's AmeriCup: gold medal (United States)

== Honours and awards ==
• USA Women's U17 National Team (2026) • USA Women's U16 National Team (2025) • FIBA U16 Women's AmeriCup gold medalist (2025) • Dallas Morning News All-Area Player of the Year • District 6-6A Offensive Player of the Year • Plano East all-time leading scorer (reported during sophomore season)
