= Libya at the 2026 Summer Youth Olympics =

- Flag of Libya
- IOC code: LBA
- NOC: Libyan Olympic Committee
- Website: www.olympic.ly

in Dakar, Senegal October 31, 2026 – November 13, 2026
- Competitors: 8 in 6 sports
- Flag bearer: Yousef Elwalid
- Medals: Gold 0 Silver 0 Bronze 0 Total 0

Summer Youth Olympics appearances
- 2010; 2014; 2018; 2026

Libya is scheduled to compete at the 2026 Summer Youth Olympics in Dakar, Senegal from October 31 to November 13, 2026. This will mark Libya's fourth appearance at the Youth Olympics, after making its debut in 2010.

Swimmer Yousef Elwalid served as the flag bearer for the opening ceremony.

== Competitors ==
The following is the list of number of competitors participating at the Games per sport/discipline.

Sport	Men	Women	Total
Athletics	1	0	1
Boxing	2	0	2
Fencing	1	0	1
Sailing	1	0	1
Swimming	1	0	1
Taekwondo	2	0	2
Total	8	0	8

== Athletics ==
Libya entered one male athlete.

=== Field events ===
Men

Athlete	Event	Final	
Athlete	Event	Distance	Position
Yahya Abdullah	Discus throw		

== Boxing ==
Libya entered two male athletes.

Men

Athlete	Weight	Round of 16	Quarterfinals	Semifinals	Final	
Athlete	Weight	Opposition Result	Opposition Result	Opposition Result	Opposition Result	Rank
Emran Bawi	–55 kg					
Jihad Mohamed	–70 kg					

== Fencing ==
Libya entered one male athlete.

Athlete	Event	Round of 64	Round of 32	Round of 16	Quarterfinal	Semifinal	Final / BM	
Athlete	Event	Opposition Score	Opposition Score	Opposition Score	Opposition Score	Opposition Score	Opposition Score	Rank
Yazin Bin Iswayd	Men's epée							

== Sailing ==
Libya entered one male athlete.

Athlete	Event	Opening Series – Points per Race											Total points	Net points	Final rank
Athlete	Event	1	2	3	4	5	6	7	8	9	10	M	Total points	Net points	Final rank
Zakarya Aledresi	Men's windsurfing														

== Swimming ==
Libya entered one male swimmer.

Athlete	Event	Heat		Final	
Athlete	Event	Time	Rank	Time	Rank
Yousef Elwalid	100 m freestyle				
Yousef Elwalid	200 m freestyle				
Yousef Elwalid	50 m breaststroke				
Yousef Elwalid	100 m breaststroke				

== Taekwondo ==
Libya entered two male athletes.

Men

Athlete	Event	Round of 16	Quarterfinals	Semifinals	Repechage	Final / BM	
Athlete	Event	Opposition Result	Opposition Result	Opposition Result	Opposition Result	Opposition Result	Rank
Mohamed Atewa	-63 kg	Bye					
Yousuf Alhabishi	-73 kg	Bye					
