= Wushu at the 2026 Summer Youth Olympics – Women's changquan combined =

Women's changquan combined at the 2026 Summer Youth Olympics
- Venue: Dakar Expo Center
- Dates: 1–3 November
- Competitors: 12 from 12 nations

Medalists
| gold medal | Sondos Sonbol | Egypt |
| silver medal | Valeria Frannerys Dudamel Alvarado | Venezuela |
| bronze medal | Lanchenbi Chanu | India |

The women's changquan combined event at the 2026 Summer Youth Olympics takes place from 1 to 3 November at the Dakar Expo Center in Dakar, Senegal. Across both rounds, athletes compete in two distinct disciplines: Gunshu and Changquan. The preliminary score for Gunshu was contested on 1 November, while the preliminary Changquan routine takes place on 2 November. The top performers qualify for the final round routines held on 3 November.

== Schedule ==
All times are Greenwich Mean Time (UTC±00:00)

| Date | Time | Phase |
|---|---|---|
| Sunday, 1 November | 14:30 | Preliminary Round – Gunshu |
| Monday, 2 November | 14:30 | Preliminary Round – Changquan |
| Tuesday, 3 November | 09:30 | Final – Gunshu |
| Tuesday, 3 November | 15:00 | Final – Changquan |

== Results ==
=== Preliminary round ===
The preliminary round stands as an aggregate qualification phase. The Gunshu segment took place on 1 November, followed by the Changquan segment on 2 November.

| Rank | Athlete | Nationality | Gunshu | Changquan | Total | Notes |
|---|---|---|---|---|---|---|
| 1 | Sondos Sonbol | Egypt | 9.153 | 9.233 | 18.386 | Q |
| 2 | Rajkumari Lanchenbi Chanu | India | 8.876 | 9.106 | 17.982 | Q |
| 3 | Valeria Frannerys Dudamel Alvarado | Venezuela | 8.683 | 8.893 | 17.576 | Q |
| 4 | Lisa Lo | France | 8.673 | 8.893 | 17.566 | Q |
| 5 | Gvantsa Karchava | Georgia | 8.710 | 8.740 | 17.450 | Q |
| 6 | Amber Jiaxin Zhou | New Zealand | 8.400 | 8.483 | 16.883 | Q |
| 7 | Samantha Regina Rojas Serrano | Mexico | 8.540 | 8.036 | 16.576 | Q |
| 8 | Maria Warda Alioua | Algeria | 8.123 | 8.376 | 16.499 | Q |
| 9 | Ludmila Rosales | Argentina | 7.690 | 7.496 | 15.186 | |
| 10 | Lara Marques | Portugal | 7.090 | 7.300 | 14.390 | |
| 11 | Tracy Assengone | Gabon | 6.710 | 7.086 | 13.796 | |
| 12 | Rashmi Tamang | Nepal | 7.026 | 6.096 | 13.122 | |

=== Final ===
The top eight athletes from the preliminary round advanced to the final phase. The scores from the final Gunshu and final Changquan routines are combined to determine the final medal standings.

| Rank | Athlete | Nationality | Gunshu | Changquan | Total |
|---|---|---|---|---|---|
| 1st place, gold medalist(s) | Sondos Sonbol | Egypt | 9.330 | 9.330 | 18.660 |
| 2nd place, silver medalist(s) | Valeria Frannerys Dudamel Alvarado | Venezuela | 9.246 | 8.953 | 18.199 |
| 3rd place, bronze medalist(s) | Rajkumari Lanchenbi Chanu | India | 8.723 | 9.316 | 18.039 |
| 4 | Gvantsa Karchava | Georgia | 8.770 | 8.930 | 17.700 |
| 5 | Lisa Lo | France | 8.693 | 8.556 | 17.249 |
| 6 | Amber Jiaxin Zhou | New Zealand | 8.533 | 8.573 | 17.106 |
| 7 | Maria Warda Alioua | Algeria | 8.193 | 8.843 | 17.036 |
| 8 | Samantha Regina Rojas Serrano | Mexico | 8.230 | 8.576 | 16.806 |
