= Boxing at the 2026 Summer Youth Olympics – Men's 50 kg =

Boxing competitions

Men's 50 kg at the 2026 Summer Youth Olympics
- Venue: Dakar Expo Center
- Date: 8–12 November 2026
- Competitors: 11 from 11 nations

The men's 50 kilograms event at the 2026 Summer Youth Olympics is being held from 8 to 12 November 2026 at the Dakar Expo Center in Dakar, Senegal. A total of 11 boxers from 11 National Olympic Committees (NOCs) are competing in the event.

The competition is being contested in a direct elimination format. The preliminary bouts took place on 8 November, followed by the quarterfinals on 10 November, semifinals on 11 November and the final on 12 November 2026.

== Schedule ==
All times are Greenwich Mean Time (UTC±00:00).

Date	Time	Event
Sunday, 8 November 2026	12:00 / 17:00	Preliminaries – Round of 16
Tuesday, 10 November 2026	12:00	Quarterfinals
Wednesday, 11 November 2026	12:00	Semifinals
Thursday, 12 November 2026	12:00	Final

== Format and rules ==
The men's 50 kg boxing event is conducted under a direct elimination format. Boxers are drawn into the competition bracket, with winners advancing to the next round and losers being eliminated. The official competition format provides for 12 boxers in each event, although 11 boxers are listed in the published draw for this category.

Each bout consists of three rounds of three minutes each, with a one-minute rest period between rounds. The men's 50 kg category uses 10-ounce (284 g) boxing gloves. Boxers must also wear headguards, gumshields and handwraps.

The scoring system is based on the 10-point must system. Five judges score each bout, awarding 10 points to the winner of each round and nine or fewer points to the opponent. The scores of all five judges are counted in determining the winner. Possible decisions include win on points (WP), referee stops contest (RSC), knockout (KO), walkover (WO) and disqualification (DSQ), among others.

The winners of the semifinals advance to the gold medal bout, while both semifinal losers receive bronze medals.

== Results ==
Legend

- WP – Won on points
- RSC – Referee stops contest
- WO – Won by walkover
- Bye – Advanced without a bout

=== Bracket ===
Preliminaries
1	Huriwaka Dean (NZL)
16	Bye
8	Yik Kan Chan (HKG)
9	Alan Jesus Ocampo Cano (MEX)	WP 5:0
5	Almohaimen Takleef (IRQ)
12	Bye
4	Bye
13	Kristian Jubani (IRL)
6	Kalenga Abraham (NAM)
11	Bye
3	Cheikh Ibrahima Fall Faye (SEN)
14	Ambekar Meetei Lairenlakpam (IND)	WP 5:0
7	Hassan Anwar Mohamed (SOM)
10	Ionut Madalin Calugar (ROU)	RSC R1 2:59
2	Bye
15	Izzon Jeffrey Galea Arevalo (COL)

Quarterfinals
Huriwaka Dean (NZL)
Alan Jesus Ocampo Cano (MEX)	WP 5:0
Almohaimen Takleef (IRQ)
Kristian Jubani (IRL)	RSC
Kalenga Abraham (NAM)
Ambekar Meetei Lairenlakpam (IND)	RSC
Ionut Madalin Calugar (ROU)
Izzon Jeffrey Galea Arevalo (COL)	WP 5:0

Semifinals
Alan Jesus Ocampo Cano (MEX)
Kristian Jubani (IRL)
Ambekar Meetei Lairenlakpam (IND)
Izzon Jeffrey Galea Arevalo (COL)

Final

== Final standings ==
Medal	Boxer	NOC
Gold		
Silver		
Bronze		
Bronze		
