= Alia Ali =

Yemen-Bosnia-American artist

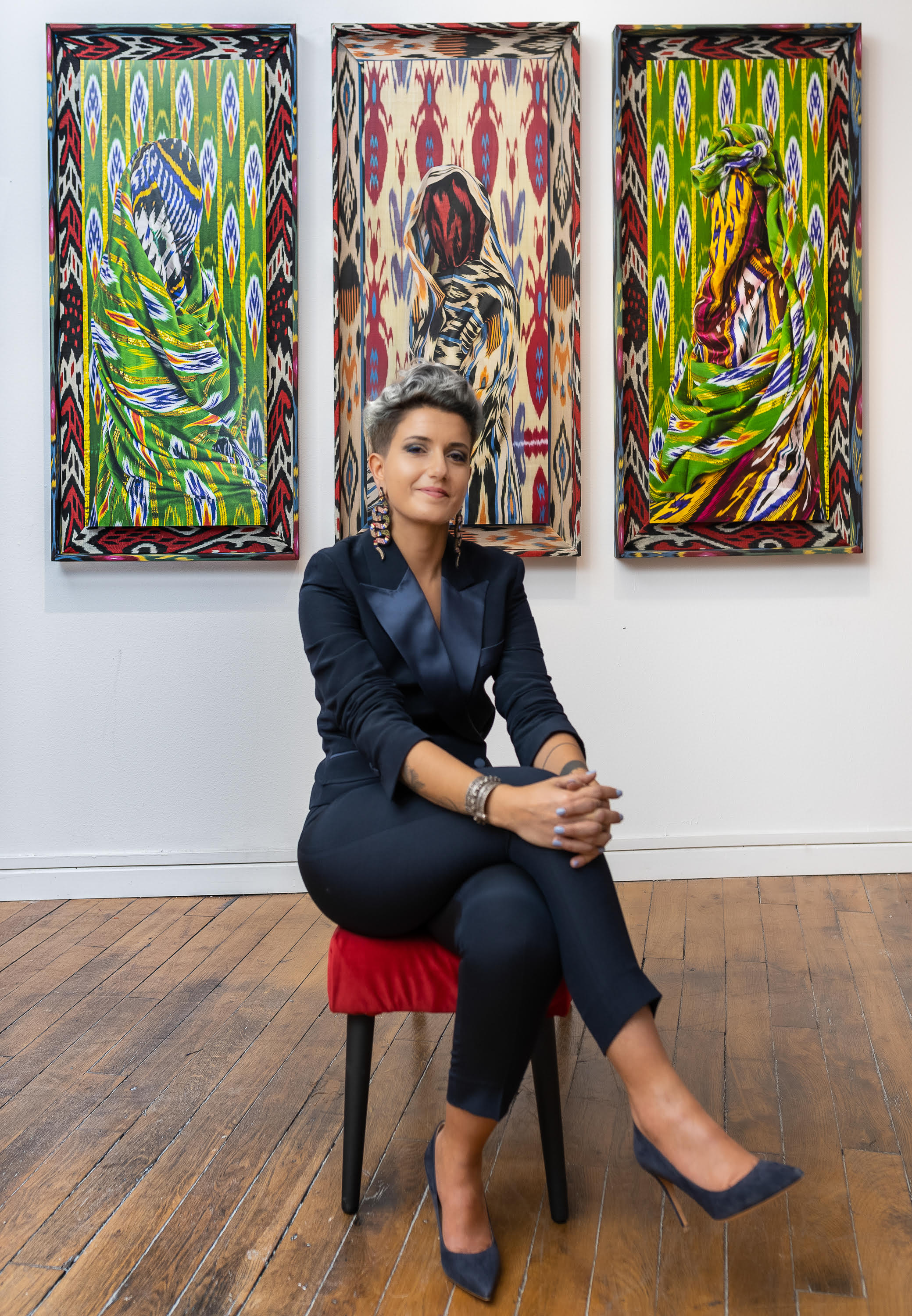
- Ali in her studio in Marrakech, 2024
- Education: Wellesley College; California Institute of the Arts
- Known for: Alia's work reflects on the politicization of the body, histories of colonization, imperialism, sexism, and racism, and the inherent dualism that exists in each of them. Yemeni Futurism, indigenous futurity, photography, installation
- Notable work: Conflict is More Profitable Than Peace (video),
- Website: www.alia-ali.com

Alia Ali (1985) is a Yemen-Bosnian-US multimedia artist whose work explores cultural binaries and confronts conflicted notions surrounding gender, citizenship. colonization diaspora, migration and Yemeni Futurism

Working within a multitude of mediums, including language, photography, sculpture, video, and installation, Alia’s work addresses the politicization of the body, histories of colonization, imperialism, sexism, and racism through projects that take pattern as their primary motif.

Textile, in particular, has been a constant in the artist's practice. Her work broadens into immersive installations utilizing light and pattern to move past language and offer an expansive, experiential understanding of self, culture, and nation.

Alia’s practice expands into discourses of Yemeni Futurism where she offers counter-narratives to appropriation, violence and disregard. Her research calls upon oral histories to reframe nostalgic pasts and to confront dystopian realities of the present in order to carve out spaces for radically imagined futures.

== Education ==
Alia completed her elementary and middle school years years in Sana’a Yemen, until her and her family came to the United States in 1998, first to Hamtramck, Michigan, and then to Bloomington, Indiana.

In 2002 she was the recipient of the Shelby Davis scholarship at the United World College (Atlantic College) in Llantwit, Major, Wales.

Ali attended Wellesley College between 2004 and 2009 with a two year leave in Ho Chi Minh, Vietnam, where she was inspired to continue her degrees in International Political Studies and Human Rights as well as Studio Art. In 2018, she completed her MFA at the California Institute of the Arts.

== Works ==
CAST NO EVIL, 2016 (LensCulture Emerging Talent Award)

BORDERLAND, 2018

FLUX, 2019-2021

MIGRATION, 2021-2022

INDIGO, 2019-2021

UNDER THREAD, 2019

MASAI, 2024

LOVE (HUB), 2021

LIBERTY, 2022-2023

BLUE NOTE, 2023

JADE, 2024

SHREDS, 2024

GLITZCH, 2024

CHROMA, 2025

REFRACTED FUTURES, 2024-2025

INSTALLATIONS

THE RED STAR, 2020-2022

NOOK, 2023

IN COLLECTIVE RISE, 2022-2023

VIDEO

MAHJAR, 2020 (14 minutes)

CONFLICT IS MORE PROFITABLE THAN PEACE, 2020 (17 minutes)
