= Dhinidhi Desinghu =

Indian swimmer (born 2010)

Personal information
- Born: 17 May 2010 (age 16) Bangalore, Karnataka, India
Medal record
Women's swimming
Representing India
Summer Youth Olympics
Bronze medal – third place	2026 Dakar	100 m freestyle
Bronze medal – third place	2026 Dakar	200 m freestyle

Dhinidhi Desinghu (born 17 May 2010) is an Indian swimmer from Karnataka. She specialises in 200m freestyle. She also competes in 100m freestyle and 200m individual medley. She qualified for the 2024 Summer Olympics at Paris in the women's 200m freestyle event as she received a Universality Quota place. She was India's youngest athlete at the Paris Games. She was also the youngest Indian athlete at the 2022 Asian Games.

== Early life and education ==
Desinghu was born on 17 May 2010 in Bangalore. She studies in Kendriya Vidyalaya DRDO, CV Raman Nagar, Bengaluru.

== Career ==
Desinghu started swimming as a leisure activity in 2018. Soon, she was spotted and took to competitive swimming. She trains under coach B. M. Madhu Kumar of Dolphin Aquatics. She was in limelight in 2023, setting a national record at the Junior and Sub-Junior National Aquatic Championship in 100m freestyle, and went on to get two more records in 200m freestyle and 200m individual medley. She also won seven gold medals at the National Games in Goa and took part in the World Championships at Doha. In 2024, she also won gold at the Karnataka Mini Olympics and Karnataka Junior and Sub-Junior Aquatic Championship.

In July 2023, she won a gold at the 76th Senior National Aquatic Championships in women's 200m freestyle. She also won a gold at the 54th Singapore National Age Group in 200m freestyle in March 2024.

== Awards and honours ==
Year	Award	Category	Result	Ref(s)
2025	Rashtriya Bal Puraskar	Highest civilian honour for children	Won	
