= Ireland at the 2026 Summer Youth Olympics =

- IOC code: IRL
- NOC: Olympic Council of Ireland
- Website: http://www.olympics.ie/

in Dakar, Senegal 31 October – 13 November 2026
- Competitors: 3 in 3 sports
- Flag bearer: Hannah Shochan (Opening)
- Medals: Gold 0 Silver 0 Bronze 0 Total 0

Summer Youth Olympics appearances
- 2010; 2014; 2018; 2026

Ireland is scheduled to compete at the 2026 Summer Youth Olympics in Dakar, Senegal from October 31 to November 13, 2026. This will mark Ireland's fourth appearance at the Youth Olympics, after making its debut in 2010.

== Competitors ==
The following is the list of number of competitors participating at the Games per sport/discipline.

Sport	Men	Women	Total
Badminton	0	1	1
Boxing	1	0	1
Coastal rowing	0	1	1
Total	1	2	3

== Badminton ==
Ireland qualified one female athlete, Hannah Shochan, a Transition Year student from South Dublin.

Athlete	Event	Group stage				Quarterfinal	Semifinal	Final / BM	Rank
Athlete	Event	Opposition Score	Opposition Score	Opposition Score	Rank	Opposition Score	Opposition Score	Opposition Score	Rank
Hannah Shochan	Girls' Singles	Popivanova (BUL) L (14–21, 15–21)	Wang (NZL) L (22–24, 16–21)	Vakk (EST)L (9–21, 11–21)	4	Did Not Advance			

== Boxing ==
Ireland qualified one male athlete, Kristian Jubani, from Crumlin Boxing Club in Dublin.

Athlete	Event	Round of 16	Quarterfinals	Semifinals	Final	
Athlete	Event	Opposition Result	Opposition Result	Opposition Result	Opposition Result	Rank
Kristian Jubani	Boy's 50kg	Bye	Takleef (IRQ) W RSC2	Ocampo Cano (MEX)		

== Coastal Rowing ==
Ireland qualified one female athlete, Kate Dunne, a rower from Wicklow Rowing Club in Wicklow

Athlete	Event	Time Trial 1		Time Trial 2		Last 16		Quarterfinal	Semi Final	Final / BM	
Athlete	Event	Time	Rank	Time	Rank	Opposition	Time	Opposition	Opposition	Opposition	Rank
Kate Dunne	Girls Solo	3:13.98	16 TT2	3:02.60	8 Q	Brendle (SUI) L	2:56.57	Did Not Advance			11

== See also ==
- Ireland at the 2026 Winter Olympics
