= Cuba at the 2026 Summer Youth Olympics =

- Flag of Cuba
- IOC code: CUB
- NOC: Cuban Olympic Committee
- Website: www.olympic.org/cuba

in Dakar, Senegal October 31, 2026 – November 13, 2026
- Competitors: 12 in 3 sports
- Flag bearers: Adis Espinel & Jean Carlos Machado
- Medals: Gold 1 Silver 0 Bronze 0 Total 1

Summer Youth Olympics appearances
- 2010; 2014; 2018; 2026

Cuba competed at the 2026 Summer Youth Olympics in Dakar, Senegal from October 31 to November 13, 2026. This will mark Cuba's fourth appearance at the Youth Olympics, after making its debut in 2010.

Baseball5 players Adis Espinel and Jean Carlos Machado served as the flag bearers for the opening ceremony. Cuba left Dakar with only 1 medal: a gold won by the mixed 5Baseball team on 3 November. This represents the lowest medal tally obtained by Cuba since the creation of the Youth Olympics.

== Competitors ==
The following is the list of number of competitors participating at the Games per sport/discipline.

Sport	Men	Women	Total
Athletics	0	3	3
Baseball5	4	4	8
Judo	0	1	1
Total	4	8	12

== Medalists ==
Medal	Name	Sport	Event	Date
Gold	Cuban Mixed' Baseball5 team: Lazaro Díaz; Adis Espinel; Jean Carlos Machado; Néstor Masso; Rachel Medina; Jairon Medina; Heylis Núñez; Geysel Pupo	Baseball5	Mixed event	3 November

== Athletics ==
Cuba entered three female athletes.

Women

Athlete	Event	Semifinal		Final	
Athlete	Event	Result	Rank	Result	Rank
Banessa Velazco	200 m	26.36	7 Q	27.01	7

=== Field events ===
Women

Athlete	Event	Final	
Athlete	Event	Distance	Position
Daniselis Reyes	High jump	1.55	8
Adriana González	Discus throw	37.54	5

== Baseball5 ==
Cuba entered a team as one of the two participating teams from the Americas.

Summary

Event	Group stage				Quarterfinals	Semifinals	Final / PG / BM	
Event	Opposition Result	Opposition Result	Opposition Result	Rank	Opposition Result	Opposition Result	Opposition Result	Rank
Mixed tournament	Turkey; W 2–0	Senegal; W 2–0	Chinese Taipei; L 0–2	2 Q	France; W 2–0	Kenya; W 2–0	Chinese Taipei; W 2–0	1st place, gold medalist(s)

Roster

- Lazaro Díaz
- Adis Espinel
- Jean Carlos Machado
- Néstor Masso
- Rachel Medina
- Jairon Medina
- Heylis Núñez
- Geysel Pupo

== Judo ==
Cuba entered one female judoka based on the available quotas assigned by the International Judo Federation.

Women

Athlete	Event	Round of 16	Quarterfinals	Semifinals	Repechage	Final / BM	
Athlete	Event	Opposition Result	Opposition Result	Opposition Result	Opposition Result	Opposition Result	Rank
Kayla Pita	-78 kg	Hannah McHenry (AUS); W 100s2-000s3	Ashly Herrera (NCA); W 101-001s1	Clarisse Vallim (BRA); L 000-001	—N/a	Cheng Yue (CHN); L w/o	5
