= Athletics at the 2026 South American Youth Games =

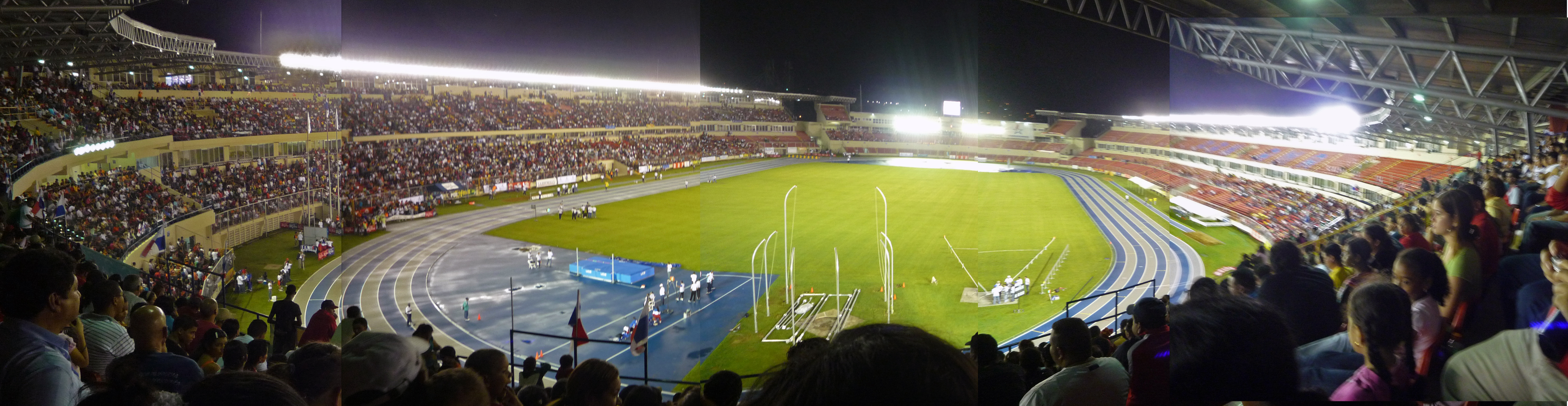
- Dates: 22–25 April
- Host city: Panama City, Panama
- Venue: Rommel Fernández Stadium
- Level: Youth (under 18)

The athletics competitions at the 2026 South American Youth Games in Panama City, Panama was held between 22 and 25 April at the Rommel Fernández Stadium. The competition served as the qualification for the 2026 Summer Youth Olympics which are set to take place in November 2026 in Dakar, Senegal.

== Medal summary ==
=== Boys ===
Event	Gold		Silver		Bronze	
100 metres (wind: +1.8 m/s)	Ezekiel Millington; Guyana	10.50	Gordon Thompson; Guyana	10.64	Franco Stefoni; Chile	10.72
200 metres (wind: 0.0 m/s)	Deuquan Farrell; Guyana	21.18 GR	Mateus Méndez; Ecuador	21.24	Pedro de Araújo; Brazil	21.74
400 metres	Kevin Aguero; Brazil	47.53	Richard Peña; Venezuela	47.86	Sergio Rojas; Colombia	48.17
800 metres	Felipe Bond; Argentina	1:56.63	Max da Silva; Brazil	1:57.01	Valentín Acuña; Chile	1:57.29
1500 metres	Thiago Goyzueta; Peru	4:01.86	Leymer Baño; Ecuador	4:03.46	Ebo McNeil; Guyana	4:07.03
3000 metres	Juan Arévalo; Colombia	8:57.55	Leymer Baño; Ecuador	8:59.68	Bruno Nuñez; Uruguay	9:03.82
110 metres hurdles (91.4 cm) (wind: -0.3 m/s)	José Sinisterra; Colombia	13.65 GR	Martín Casali; Chile	14.03	Gustavo Pacheco; Brazil	14.24
400 metres hurdles (84.0 cm)	Mateus Méndez; Ecuador	53.11	Donny Morquecho; Ecuador	53.42	Juan Torrealba; Chile	54.22
2000 metres steeplechase	Thiago Goyzueta; Peru	5:57.51 GR	Bruno Nuñez; Uruguay	6:03.39	Erick Guerrero; Ecuador	6:03.59
4 × 100 metres relay	Guyana; David Williams; Gordon Thompson; Ezekiel Millington; Ade Sealy; Deuquan Farrell	41.56	Chile; Martín Casali; Mateo Fernández; Tomás Peñaloza; Franco Stefoni; Nicolás Valdivia	42.33	Brazil; Nicolas da Silva; Rafael Brigano; Gustavo Gomes; Joao Fernandes; Johnata Moura; Pedro de Araújo	43.23
4 × 400 metres relay	Colombia; Juan Ibarra; José Miguel Valencia; José Sinisterra; Sergio Rojas	3:16.39	Chile; Nicolás Valdivia; Valentin Acuña; Diego Cubas; Thomas Peñaloza	3:18.39	Guyana; Ade Sealy; Deuquan Farrell; Gordon Thompson; Ebo McNeil	3:20.46
5 kilometres walk	George Espinoza; Peru	21:37.28	Jessi Chacón; Venezuela	22:53.13	Santino Reynoso; Argentina	22:55.85
High jump	Naftaly Magalhaes; Brazil	2.08 =GR	Lucas Silva; Brazil	2.08 =GR	Ernesto Carabali; Ecuador	1.94
Long jump	Pedro Olmos; Argentina	7.30 GR	Joao Fernandes; Brazil	7.03	Nicolás Seydewitz; Chile	6.94
Triple jump	Nicolas da Silva; Brazil	15.55 GR	Nicolás Seydewitz; Chile	14.76	Guilherme Dos Santos; Brazil	14.11
Shot put (5 kg)	Pyetro Souza; Brazil	17.96	Gabriel Leite; Brazil	17.86	Mateo Palomino; Colombia	17.75
Discus throw (1.5 kg)	Vittorio Gorziglia; Chile	57.77	Henthonny Moraes; Brazil	56.77	Julián González; Chile	55.16
Hammer throw (5 kg)	Patry Valdez; Ecuador	75.50 GR	José de Almeida; Brazil	65.54	Abílio Barbosa; Brazil	65.51
Javelin throw (700 g)	Dilan Graciano; Colombia	68.80	Pedro da Silva; Brazil	68.19	Marko Kaethler; Paraguay	63.35

=== Girls ===
Event	Gold		Silver		Bronze	
100 metres (wind: -0.5 m/s)	Roxana Ramírez; Chile	11.81	Olivia Conesa; Argentina	11.87	Emily Román; Colombia	12.08
200 metres (wind: +0.1 m/s)	Roxana Ramírez; Chile	24.10	Olivia Conesa; Argentina	24.33	Dayara Tovar; Colombia	24.84
400 metres	Waleska Ortiz; Venezuela	54.34 GR	Daniela Castro; Ecuador	54.41	Dilany Melo; Venezuela	54.84
800 metres	Valentina Cancino; Chile	2:11.13 GR	Aurelia Loroño; Chile	2:14.38	Thais Azarias; Brazil	2:14.94
1500 metres	Valentina Cancino; Chile	4:26.84 GR	Zoe Gorski; Argentina	4:27.84	Nicole Herdy; Brazil	4:28.48
3000 metres	Zoe Gorski; Argentina	9:38.71 GR	Irene Pernia; Argentina	9:40.89	Danna Rizo; Colombia	10:18.25
100 metres hurdles (76.2 cm) (wind: -0.2 m/s)	Juliana Rodríguez; Colombia	13.74	Wanda Arizala; Colombia	13.96	Sahra Boada; Venezuela	14.25
400 metres hurdles	Michel Gómez; Colombia	60.83	Gloria Cañola; Ecuador	61.19	Larissa Schon; Brazil	61.63
2000 metres steeplechase	Antonella Bonomi; Uruguay	6:57.92 GR	Eloisa Fuchslocher; Chile	7:15.31	Ana Domingues; Brazil	7:17.31
4 × 100 metres relay	Colombia; Emily Román; Juliana Rodríguez; Wanda Arizala; Dayara Tovar	46.88	Paraguay; Jimena Sostoa; Heidi Pigisch; Lara González; Naira Wiebe	47.58	Peru; Isabel Quiroz; Catalina Yzaga; Domenica Crose; Romina Fiol	47.63
4 × 400 metres relay	Venezuela; Dilany Melo; Osmary Pacheco; Nicolth Cacique; Waleska Ortiz	3:45.05	Colombia; Wanda Arizala; Sarah Muñoz; Dayara Tovar; Michel Gómez	3:51.37	Chile; Emily Delgado; Valentina Cancino; Aurelia Lorono; Florencia Rojas	3:53.02
High jump	Jeraldine Pata; Ecuador	1.69	María Montes; Chile; Maria Belmonte; Brazil	1.66	Not awarded	
Pole vault	Oriana Saavedra; Venezuela	3.50	Juana Echeverría; Argentina	3.35	Ana León; Venezuela	3.20
Long jump	Alexandra Segura; Ecuador	5.71	Sahra Boada; Venezuela	5.67	Domenica Crose; Peru	5.58
Triple jump	Yoglannys Arenas; Venezuela	12.06	Samara Boada; Venezuela	11.91	Alexandra Segura; Ecuador	11.86
Shot put (3 kg)	Maria Maier; Brazil	15.81 GR	Marya da Silva; Brazil	15.30	Ornela Pérez; Argentina	15.06
Discus throw	Isabel Sánchez; Venezuela	46.04 GR	Giovana Reia; Brazil	38.97	Ana Salinas; Bolivia	38.33
Hammer throw (3 kg)	Maria da Fonseca; Brazil	62.01 GR	Ashly Hinestroza; Colombia	61.90	Juana Marino; Argentina	57.52
Javelin throw (500 g)	Ilsa Córdoba; Colombia	55.69 GR	Narcisa Medina; Ecuador	51.85	Aura Ramos; Venezuela	48.36

=== Mixed ===
Event	Gold		Silver		Bronze	
4 × 400 metres relay	Colombia; Sergio Rojas; Laura Alcala; José Miguel Valencia; Michel Gómez	3:26.75	Ecuador; Donny Morquecho; Tatiana Díaz; Mateus Mendez; Daniela Castro	3:26.82	Venezuela; Jesús Álvarez; Dilany Melo; Richard Peña; Waleska Ortiz	3:30.34

== Medal table ==
* Host nation (Panama)

Rank	Nation	Gold	Silver	Bronze	Total
1	Colombia	9	3	5	17
2	Brazil	6	10	9	25
3	Chile	5	7	6	18
4	Venezuela	5	4	5	14
5	Ecuador	4	8	3	15
6	Argentina	3	5	3	11
7	Guyana	3	1	2	6
8	Peru	3	0	2	5
9	Uruguay	1	1	1	3
10	Paraguay	0	1	1	2
11	Bolivia	0	0	1	1
Totals (11 entries)		39	40	38	117
