= Republic of the Congo at the 2026 Summer Youth Olympics =

- Flag of Republic of the Congo
- IOC code: CGO
- NOC: Comité National Olympique et Sportif Congolais
- Website: www.cnosc.net

in Dakar, Senegal October 31, 2026 – November 13, 2026
- Competitors: 4 in 4 sports
- Flag bearer: Tatiana Itoua
- Medals: Gold 0 Silver 0 Bronze 0 Total 0

Summer Youth Olympics appearances
- 2010; 2014; 2018; 2026

Republic of the Congo is scheduled to compete at the 2026 Summer Youth Olympics in Dakar, Senegal from October 31 to November 13, 2026. This will mark Republic of the Congo's fourth appearance at the Youth Olympics, after making its debut in 2010.

Judoka Tatiana Itoua served as the flag bearer for the opening ceremony.

== Competitors ==
The following is the list of number of competitors participating at the Games per sport/discipline.

Sport	Men	Women	Total
Athletics	1	0	1
Judo	0	1	1
Swimming	0	1	1
Taekwondo	1	0	1
Total	2	2	4

== Athletics ==
Republic of the Congo entered one male athlete.

=== Track & road events ===
Men

Athlete	Event	Heat		Semifinal		Final	
Athlete	Event	Result	Rank	Result	Rank	Result	Rank
Hussein Abou Marianno	400 m hurdles						

== Judo ==
Republic of the Congo entered one female judoka based on the available quotas assigned by the International Judo Federation.

Women

Athlete	Event	Round of 16	Quarterfinals	Semifinals	Repechage 1	Repechage 2	Final	
Athlete	Event	Opposition Result	Opposition Result	Opposition Result	Opposition Result	Opposition Result	Opposition Result	Rank
Tatiana Itoua	–78 kg							

== Swimming ==
Republic of the Congo entered one female swimmer.

Athlete	Event	Heat		Final	
Athlete	Event	Time	Rank	Time	Rank
Kamila Ibrahim	50 m freestyle				
Kamila Ibrahim	50 m butterfly	39.06	40	Did not advance	

== Taekwondo ==
Republic of the Congo entered one male athlete.

Men

Athlete	Event	Round of 16	Quarterfinals	Semifinals	Repechage	Final / BM	
Athlete	Event	Opposition Result	Opposition Result	Opposition Result	Opposition Result	Opposition Result	Rank
Isaac Bikindou	-55 kg	Bye					
