= Syria at the 2026 Summer Youth Olympics =

- Flag of Syria
- IOC code: SYR
- NOC: Syrian Olympic Committee

in Dakar, Senegal October 31, 2026 – November 13, 2026
- Competitors: 10 in 2 sports
- Flag bearers: Malak Armaan & Ahmad Alshehadat
- Medals: Gold 0 Silver 0 Bronze 0 Total 0

Summer Youth Olympics appearances
- 2010; 2014; 2018; 2026

Syria is scheduled to compete at the 2026 Summer Youth Olympics in Dakar, Senegal from October 31 to November 13, 2026. This will mark Syria's fourth appearance at the Youth Olympics, after making its debut in 2010.

Baseball 5 players Malak Armaan and Ahmad Alshehadat served as the flag bearers for the opening ceremony.

== Competitors ==
The following is the list of number of competitors participating at the Games per sport/discipline.

Sport	Men	Women	Total
Athletics	1	1	2
Baseball5	4	4	8
Total	5	5	10

== Athletics ==
Syria entered two track athletes in individual events.

Track events

Athlete	Event	Heat		Semifinal		Final	
Athlete	Event	Result	Rank	Result	Rank	Result	Rank
Hady Abbas	Men's 400 m						
Jana Mhalla	Women's 200 m						

== Baseball5 ==
Syria qualified a mixed Baseball5 team as one of the two participating representatives from Asia. The squad is notably composed entirely of refugees from the Azraq Camp in Jordan, where the discipline was introduced in 2023.

Summary

Event	Group stage				Quarterfinals	Semifinals	Final / PG / BM	
Event	Opposition Result	Opposition Result	Opposition Result	Rank	Opposition Result	Opposition Result	Opposition Result	Rank
Mixed tournament	Mexico; L 1―2	France; L 0―2	Kenya; L 0–2	4	Not qualified		Senegal –	

Roster

- Saleh Alali
- Aya Alsalemeh
- Mohamad Alsayed Khalil
- Ahmad Alshehadat
- Ahd Alshibli
- Bayan Althlijan
- Malak Armaan
- Ali Hadrous
