= Judo at the 2026 Summer Youth Olympics – Women's 78 kg =

Judo Women's 78 kg at the 2026 Summer Youth Olympics
- Venue: Complexe Iba Mar Diop
- Location: Dakar, Senegal
- Date: 3 November
- Competitors: 12 from 12 nations

Medalists
gold medal	Clarisse Vallim	Brazil
silver medal	Anastasiia Dobrovolskaia	Russia
bronze medal	Selina Wögerer	Austria
bronze medal	Cheng Yue	China

Competition at external databases
- Links: IJF

The women's 78 kg competition in judo at the 2026 Summer Youth Olympics in Dakar was held on 3 November 2026 at the Dakar Expo Centre.

== Results ==
=== Main bracket ===
Round of 16
Lenishka Figueroa (PUR)	000
Arba Hasanaj (KOS)	101
Kayla Pita (CUB)	100
Hannah McHenry (AUS)	000
Tatiana Itoua (CGO)	100
Cheng Yue (CHN)	000
Makanaka Nherera (ZIM)	000
Anastasiia Dobrovolskaia (RUS)	100

Quarterfinals
Clarisse Vallim (BRA)	110
Arba Hasanaj (KOS)	000
Ashly Herrera (NCA)	001 (yellow card)
Kayla Pita (CUB)	101
Selina Wögerer (AUT)	100
Tatiana Itoua (CGO)	000
Ariadna Chávez (MEX)	000
Anastasiia Dobrovolskaia (RUS)	102

Semifinals
Clarisse Vallim (BRA)	100
Kayla Pita (CUB)	000
Selina Wögerer (AUT)	000
Anastasiia Dobrovolskaia (RUS)	100

Final
Clarisse Vallim (BRA)	110 (yellow card)
Anastasiia Dobrovolskaia (RUS)	000

=== Repechage ===
Repechage 1
Lenishka Figueroa (PUR)	010 (yellow card)
Ashly Herrera (NCA)	110
Hannah McHenry (AUS)	000
Arba Hasanaj (KOS)	100 (yellow card)
Cheng Yue (CHN)	101 (yellow card)
Ariadna Chávez (MEX)	000
Makanaka Nherera (ZIM)	000
Tatiana Itoua (CGO)	100

Repechage 2
Ashly Herrera (NCA)	000 (yellow card)
Arba Hasanaj (KOS)	100
Cheng Yue (CHN)	101
Tatiana Itoua (CGO)	000 (yellow card)

Bronze medal
Arba Hasanaj (KOS)	000
Selina Wögerer (AUT)	100
Cheng Yue (CHN)	w/o
Kayla Pita (CUB)	0
