= 2025 World Judo Cadets Championships =

Judo competition

2025 Judo World Judo Cadets Championships
- Venue: Asics Arena
- Location: Sofia, Bulgaria
- Dates: 27–31 August
- Competitors: 551 from 71 nations
- Total prize money: €100,000

Champions
- Mixed team: Japan (3rd title)

Competition at external databases
- Links: IJF • JudoInside

The 2025 World Judo Cadets Championships were held at the Asics Arena in Sofia, Bulgaria, from 27 to 31 August 2025. A mixed team event took place on the competition's last day.

== Medal summary ==
=== Men's events ===
Event	Gold	Silver	Bronze
−50 kg	Khushnud Sultanov (UZB)	Arthur Melo (BRA)	Arman Myssa (KAZ)
−50 kg	Khushnud Sultanov (UZB)	Arthur Melo (BRA)	Anar Guliyev (AZE)
−55 kg	Khushnudbek Burkhonov (UZB)	Matteo Gualandi (ITA)	Adris Jakubauskas (LTU)
−55 kg	Khushnudbek Burkhonov (UZB)	Matteo Gualandi (ITA)	Aleksei Toptygin (IJF)
−60 kg	Yernur Batyrgali (KAZ)	Loiq Kudbudinov (TJK)	Zeyd Alasgarov (AZE)
−60 kg	Yernur Batyrgali (KAZ)	Loiq Kudbudinov (TJK)	Dilshod Karimov (UZB)
−66 kg	Rakhim Khamkhoev (IJF)	Mukhammedali Zhylkaidar (KAZ)	Muslim Kotiev (IJF)
−66 kg	Rakhim Khamkhoev (IJF)	Mukhammedali Zhylkaidar (KAZ)	Rolan Kairgali (KAZ)
−73 kg	Veljko Varničić (SRB)	Keisho Mitsuishi (JPN)	Vasil Gamezardashvili (GEO)
−73 kg	Veljko Varničić (SRB)	Keisho Mitsuishi (JPN)	Sadulla Ravshanov (UZB)
−81 kg	Inomjon Bakhodirov (UZB)	Giorgi Mumladze (GEO)	Timur Aliev (IJF)
−81 kg	Inomjon Bakhodirov (UZB)	Giorgi Mumladze (GEO)	Tajus Babaičenko (LTU)
−90 kg	Abdula Suleimanov (IJF)	Maksim Strokun (BLR)	Giorgi Zurabashvili (GEO)
−90 kg	Abdula Suleimanov (IJF)	Maksim Strokun (BLR)	Francesco Mazzon (ITA)
+90 kg	Ioane Abalaki (GEO)	Kaito Tokita (JPN)	Giorgi Karchaidze (GEO)
+90 kg	Ioane Abalaki (GEO)	Kaito Tokita (JPN)	Adilzhan Zhaudinov (KAZ)

=== Women's events ===
Event	Gold	Silver	Bronze
−40 kg	Dilafruz Boltaboeva (UZB)	Sema Nur Yüksel (TUR)	Bayarzulyn Khulan (MGL)
−40 kg	Dilafruz Boltaboeva (UZB)	Sema Nur Yüksel (TUR)	Fenne Peeters (BEL)
−44 kg	Nadezhda Mishenkina (IJF)	Livanur Kayır (TUR)	Yang Zi-yu (TPE)
−44 kg	Nadezhda Mishenkina (IJF)	Livanur Kayır (TUR)	Sandra Walendzik (POL)
−48 kg	Clarice Ribeiro (BRA)	Maëlys Dapa (BEL)	Barbara Twarowska (POL)
−48 kg	Clarice Ribeiro (BRA)	Maëlys Dapa (BEL)	Nourane Moussati (FRA)
−52 kg	Rio Shirakane (JPN)	Sofia Cordova (SWE)	Mónica Martínez de Rituerto (ESP)
−52 kg	Rio Shirakane (JPN)	Sofia Cordova (SWE)	Nicole Marques (BRA)
−57 kg	Mashbatyn Tsendbazar (MGL)	Nonoka Yamakawa (JPN)	Gankhuyagiin Enkhjin (MGL)
−57 kg	Mashbatyn Tsendbazar (MGL)	Nonoka Yamakawa (JPN)	Magdalena Wałęga (POL)
−63 kg	Aishat Alieva (IJF)	Ilariia Tsurkan (SLO)	Laryssa Fonseca (BRA)
−63 kg	Aishat Alieva (IJF)	Ilariia Tsurkan (SLO)	Chloé Jean (FRA)
−70 kg	Clarisse Vallim (BRA)	Charlie Thibault (CAN)	Diana Benkova (POL)
−70 kg	Clarisse Vallim (BRA)	Charlie Thibault (CAN)	Keti Robakidze (GEO)
+70 kg	Umida Nigmatova (UZB)	Emma Feuillet-Nguimgo (FRA)	Kristýna Kaszperová (CZE)
+70 kg	Umida Nigmatova (UZB)	Emma Feuillet-Nguimgo (FRA)	Misuzu Katsumata (JPN)

=== Mixed ===
Event	Gold	Silver	Bronze
Mixed team	Japan	Uzbekistan	Poland
Mixed team	Japan	Uzbekistan	IJF

=== Medal table ===
* Host nation (Bulgaria)

Rank	Nation	Gold	Silver	Bronze	Total
1	Uzbekistan (UZB)	5	1	2	8
2	International Judo Federation (IJF)	4	0	4	8
3	Japan (JPN)	2	3	1	6
4	Brazil (BRA)	2	1	2	5
5	Georgia (GEO)	1	1	4	6
6	Kazakhstan (KAZ)	1	1	3	5
7	Mongolia (MGL)	1	0	2	3
8	Serbia (SRB)	1	0	0	1
9	Turkey (TUR)	0	2	0	2
10	France (FRA)	0	1	2	3
11	Belgium (BEL)	0	1	1	2
11	Italy (ITA)	0	1	1	2
13	Belarus (BLR)	0	1	0	1
13	Canada (CAN)	0	1	0	1
13	Slovenia (SLO)	0	1	0	1
13	Sweden (SWE)	0	1	0	1
13	Tajikistan (TJK)	0	1	0	1
18	Poland (POL)	0	0	5	5
19	Azerbaijan (AZE)	0	0	2	2
19	Lithuania (LTU)	0	0	2	2
21	Chinese Taipei (TPE)	0	0	1	1
21	Czech Republic (CZE)	0	0	1	1
21	Spain (ESP)	0	0	1	1
Totals (23 entries)		17	17	34	68

== Prize money ==
The sums written are per medalist, bringing the total prizes awarded to €80,000 for the individual contests and €20,000 for the team competition. (retrieved from:)

Medal	Individual			Mixed team		
Medal	Total	Judoka	Coach	Total	Judoka	Coach
Gold	€2,300	€1,840	€460	€8,000	€6,400	€1,600
Silver	€1,300	€1,040	€260	€5,600	€4,480	€1,120
Bronze	€700	€560	€140	€3,200	€2,560	€640
