= Baseball5 at the 2026 Summer Youth Olympics =

Baseball5 at the IV Summer Youth Olympic Games
- Venue: Complexe Tour de L'Œuf
- Dates: 30 October–3 November
- No. of events: 1 (1 mixed)
- Competitors: 64 from 8 nations

Medalists
1st place, gold medalist(s)		Cuba
2nd place, silver medalist(s)		Chinese Taipei
3rd place, bronze medalist(s)		Mexico

Baseball5 at the 2026 Summer Youth Olympics was held from 30 October to 3 November. The event took place at Complexe Tour de L'Œuf in Dakar, Senegal. This was the first time that any form of baseball featured at the Youth Olympics.

== Medalists ==
Event	Gold	Silver	Bronze
Mixed event	Cuba; Lázaro Díaz; Adis Espinel; Jean Machado; Néstor Masso; Rachel Medina; Jairon Medina; Heylis Núñez; Geysel Pupo	Chinese Taipei; An Wei-jie; Chang Wen-ting; Chen Wan-zih; Chen Yu-en; Hsu Shao-ting; Hsu Tzu-yi; Liu En-hao; Pan Yu-fan	Mexico; Jesús Espinoza; Oliva Frías; Sebastián Leal; Abril Martínez; Carlos Mercado; Isaac Rodríguez; Erika Solís; Edsy Valenzuela

== Qualification ==
The World Baseball Softball Confederation (WBSC) announced the participating nations on 26 May 2026.

- Senegal
- Kenya
- Cuba
- Mexico
- France
- Turkey
- Chinese Taipei
- Syria

== Competition format ==
First the 8 teams will be split up into two groups of four. The winners of the group stage directly qualify for the semi finals.The second and third best teams from the group stage move on to the quarter finals first, where the second of Group A will face off the third placed team from Group B and vice versa, competing for the remaining two spots in the semi final.

== Group stage ==
The draw of the groups was announced on 10 September 2026.

Group A
Team
Cuba
Chinese Taipei
Senegal (host)
Turkey

Group B
Team
France
Mexico
Kenya
Syria

=== Group A ===
Pos	Team	Pld	W	L	RF	RA	RD	PCT	GB	Qualification
1	Chinese Taipei	3	3	0	48	14	+34	1.000	—	Semifinals
2	Cuba	3	2	1	46	12	+34	.667	1	Quarterfinals
3	Turkey	3	1	2	36	35	+1	.333	2	Quarterfinals
4	Senegal (H)	3	0	3	10	79	−69	.000	3	Seventh place game

Source: IOC
(H) Hosts

==== Turkey vs. Cuba ====
Set 1

30 October 10:00 (GMT) Complexe Tour de L'Œuf
Team	1	2	3	4	5	R	H	E
Turkey	0	0	0	0	0	0	6	1
Cuba	1	2	0	3	X	6	12	0
Boxscore

Set 2

30 October 10:00 (GMT) Complexe Tour de L'Œuf
Team	1	2	3	4	5	R	H	E
Turkey	2	0	0	0	0	2	7	0
Cuba	0	1	2	0	X	3	8	0
Boxscore

==== Senegal vs. Chinese Taipei ====
Set 1

30 October 11:30 (GMT) Complexe Tour de L'Œuf
Team	1	2	3	4	5	R	H	E
Senegal	0	0	0	1	X	1	5	0
Chinese Taipei	4	0	3	4	X	11	18	0
Boxscore

Set 2

30 October 11:30 (GMT) Complexe Tour de L'Œuf
Team	1	2	3	4	5	R	H	E
Senegal	0	0	0	0	X	0	6	1
Chinese Taipei	5	4	0	1	X	10	19	0
Boxscore

==== Turkey vs. Chinese Taipei ====
Set 1

31 October 08:30 (GMT) Complexe Tour de L'Œuf
Team	1	2	3	4	5	R	H	E
Turkey	0	1	0	0	X	1	11	1
Chinese Taipei	4	2	5	X	X	11	15	0
Boxscore

Set 2

31 October 08:30 (GMT) Complexe Tour de L'Œuf
Team	1	2	3	4	5	R	H	E
Turkey	3	0	1	0	1	5	14	1
Chinese Taipei	0	2	0	1	3	6	17	0
Boxscore

==== Cuba vs. Senegal ====
Set 1

31 October 13:00 (GMT) Complexe Tour de L'Œuf
Team	1	2	3	4	5	R	H	E
Cuba	11	0	3	3	X	17	28	0
Senegal	0	0	0	0	X	0	3	1
Boxscore

Set 2

31 October 13:00 (GMT) Complexe Tour de L'Œuf
Team	1	2	3	4	5	R	H	E
Cuba	4	5	3	1	X	13	21	0
Senegal	0	0	0	0	X	0	4	0
Boxscore

==== Chinese Taipei vs. Cuba ====
Set 1

1 November 15:00 (GMT) Complexe Tour de L'Œuf
Team	1	2	3	4	5	R	H	E
Chinese Taipei	2	0	0	0	3	5	8	0
Cuba	3	0	0	0	0	3	14	1
Boxscore

Set 2

1 November 15:00 (GMT) Complexe Tour de L'Œuf
Team	1	2	3	4	5	R	H	E
Chinese Taipei	0	0	5	0	0	5	12	0
Cuba	0	0	3	1	0	4	14	0
Boxscore

==== Senegal vs. Turkey ====
Set 1

1 November 16:30 (GMT) Complexe Tour de L'Œuf
Team	1	2	3	4	5	R	H	E
Senegal	3	1	0	2	0	6	15	0
Turkey	8	2	2	1	X	13	21	1
Boxscore

Set 2

1 November 16:30 (GMT) Complexe Tour de L'Œuf
Team	1	2	3	4	5	R	H	E
Senegal	1	0	0	2	X	3	9	1
Turkey	4	5	6	X	X	15	21	0
Boxscore

=== Group B ===
Pos	Team	Pld	W	L	RF	RA	RD	PCT	GB	Qualification
1	Kenya	3	3	0	42	27	+15	1.000	—	Semifinals
2	Mexico	3	2	1	66	37	+29	.667	1	Quarterfinals
3	France	3	1	2	53	43	+10	.333	2	Quarterfinals
4	Syria	3	0	3	22	76	−54	.000	3	Seventh place game

Source: IOC

==== Syria vs. Mexico ====
Set 1

30 October 15:00 (GMT) Complexe Tour de L'Œuf
Team	1	2	3	4	5	R	H	E
Syria	0	0	0	1	X	1	7	1
Mexico	8	1	3	X	X	12	17	0
Boxscore

Set 2

30 October 15:00 (GMT) Complexe Tour de L'Œuf
Team	1	2	3	4	5	R	H	E
Syria	6	0	0	5	0	11	19	0
Mexico	5	1	1	2	0	9	18	1
Boxscore

Set 3

30 October 15:00 (GMT) Complexe Tour de L'Œuf
Team	1	2	3	4	5	R	H	E
Syria	1	0	0	1	X	2	6	0
Mexico	6	0	5	1	X	12	21	0
Boxscore

==== Kenya vs. France ====
Set 1

30 October 16:30 (GMT) Complexe Tour de L'Œuf
Team	1	2	3	4	5	R	H	E
Kenya	1	0	0	3	0	4	13	2
France	0	0	0	6	0	6	10	0
Boxscore

Set 2

30 October 16:30 (GMT) Complexe Tour de L'Œuf
Team	1	2	3	4	5	R	H	E
Kenya	0	0	2	0	6	8	21	1
France	0	0	0	1	4	5	13	0
Boxscore

Set 3

30 October 16:30 (GMT) Complexe Tour de L'Œuf
Team	1	2	3	4	5	R	H	E
Kenya	1	0	3	0	0	4	14	3
France	2	0	0	0	0	2	7	0
Boxscore

==== France vs. Syria ====
Set 1

31 October 10:00 (GMT) Complexe Tour de L'Œuf
Team	1	2	3	4	5	R	H	E
France	9	12	0	X	X	21	26	0
Syria	1	0	0	X	X	1	3	1
Boxscore

Set 2

31 October 10:00 (GMT) Complexe Tour de L'Œuf
Team	1	2	3	4	5	R	H	E
France	1	1	0	5	1	8	16	0
Syria	0	0	0	0	3	3	12	0
Boxscore

==== Kenya vs. Mexico ====
Set 1

31 October 11:30 (GMT) Complexe Tour de L'Œuf
Team	1	2	3	4	5	6	7	R	H	E
Kenya	3	0	0	0	0	2	1	6	15	0
Mexico	0	1	2	0	0	2	0	5	14	1
Boxscore

Set 2

31 October 11:30 (GMT) Complexe Tour de L'Œuf
Team	1	2	3	4	5	6	R	H	E
Kenya	1	0	2	0	0	3	6	18	0
Mexico	0	1	0	2	0	2	5	15	0
Boxscore

==== Syria vs. Kenya ====
Set 1

1 November 10:30 (GMT) Complexe Tour de L'Œuf
Team	1	2	3	4	5	R	H	E
Syria	2	0	0	1	0	3	10	1
Kenya	0	4	0	0	0	4	10	1
Boxscore

Set 2

1 November 10:30 (GMT) Complexe Tour de L'Œuf
Team	1	2	3	4	5	R	H	E
Syria	0	0	0	1	0	1	8	2
Kenya	4	4	2	0	0	10	18	0
Boxscore

==== Mexico vs. France ====
Set 1

1 November 12:00 (GMT) Complexe Tour de L'Œuf
Team	1	2	3	4	5	R	H	E
Mexico	3	0	2	1	1	7	15	1
France	2	2	0	0	1	5	14	2
Boxscore

Set 2

1 November 12:00 (GMT) Complexe Tour de L'Œuf
Team	1	2	3	4	5	R	H	E
Mexico	0	4	5	1	6	16	26	2
France	1	0	5	0	0	6	15	1
Boxscore

== Knockout stage ==
=== Bracket ===
Quarterfinals
2 November
Turkey	0
Mexico	2
2 November
France	0
Cuba	2

Semifinals
2 November
Chinese Taipei	2
Mexico	1
2 November
Cuba	2
Kenya	0

Gold medal
3 November
Chinese Taipei	0
Cuba	2
Bronze medal
3 November
Mexico	2
Kenya	1

Source:IOC

=== Quarterfinals ===
==== France vs. Cuba ====
Set 1

2 November 10:30 (GMT) Complexe Tour de L'Œuf
Team	1	2	3	4	5	R	H	E
France	1	0	0	0	1	2	7	0
Cuba	0	0	1	1	1	3	12	0
Boxscore

Set 2

2 November 10:30 (GMT) Complexe Tour de L'Œuf
Team	1	2	3	4	5	R	H	E
France	0	0	0	1	0	1	8	0
Cuba	2	3	0	0	X	5	12	1
Boxscore

==== Turkey vs. Mexico ====
Set 1

2 November 12:00 (GMT) Complexe Tour de L'Œuf
Team	1	2	3	4	5	R	H	E
Turkey	0	2	0	3	0	5	13	1
Mexico	4	0	5	1	0	10	15	0
Boxscore

Set 2

2 November 12:00 (GMT) Complexe Tour de L'Œuf
Team	1	2	3	4	5	R	H	E
Turkey	0	2	0	4	1	7	16	0
Mexico	1	3	4	4	0	12	18	0
Boxscore

=== Semifinals ===
==== Cuba vs. Kenya ====
Set 1

2 November 15:00 (GMT) Complexe Tour de L'Œuf
Team	1	2	3	4	5	R	H	E
Cuba	2	0	6	4	2	14	23	1
Kenya	0	2	2	1	2	7	16	0
Boxscore

Set 2

2 November 15:00 (GMT) Complexe Tour de L'Œuf
Team	1	2	3	4	5	R	H	E
Cuba	5	0	1	0	5	11	21	0
Kenya	0	0	1	0	0	1	7	0
Boxscore

==== Chinese Taipei vs. Mexico ====
Set 1

2 November 16:30 (GMT) Complexe Tour de L'Œuf
Team	1	2	3	4	5	R	H	E
Mexico	0	0	2	0	X	2	6	1
Chinese Taipei	7	5	0	0	X	12	19	0
Boxscore

Set 2

2 November 16:30 (GMT) Complexe Tour de L'Œuf
Team	1	2	3	4	5	R	H	E
Mexico	0	3	2	0	3	8	14	1
Chinese Taipei	1	0	0	1	0	2	10	0
Boxscore

Set 3

2 November 16:30 (GMT) Complexe Tour de L'Œuf
Team	1	2	3	4	5	R	H	E
Mexico	1	1	0	0	0	2	11	0
Chinese Taipei	0	5	0	2	0	7	14	0
Boxscore

=== 7th place game ===
Set 1

3 November 10:30 (GMT) Complexe Tour de L'Œuf
Team	1	2	3	4	5	R	H	E
Syria	0	0	2	1	0	3	14	0
Senegal	0	0	1	0	0	1	10	0
Boxscore

Set 2

3 November 10:30 (GMT) Complexe Tour de L'Œuf
Team	1	2	3	4	5	R	H	E
Syria	0	0	0	0	0	0	6	0
Senegal	0	2	0	6	0	8	16	0
Boxscore

Set 3

3 November 10:30 (GMT) Complexe Tour de L'Œuf
Team	1	2	3	4	5	R	H	E
Syria	3	1	2	0	0	6	17	0
Senegal	2	0	0	1	1	4	13	0
Boxscore

=== 5th place game ===
Set 1

3 November 12:00 (GMT) Complexe Tour de L'Œuf
Team	1	2	3	4	5	R	H	E
France	0	0	2	0	4	6	17	0
Turkey	6	0	1	2	0	9	17	1
Boxscore

Set 2

3 November 12:00 (GMT) Complexe Tour de L'Œuf
Team	1	2	3	4	5	R	H	E
France	1	0	3	0	0	4	9	0
Turkey	5	0	0	5	0	10	18	1
Boxscore

=== Bronze medal game ===
Set 1

3 November 12:00 (GMT) Complexe Tour de L'Œuf
Team	1	2	3	4	5	R	H	E
Mexico	6	1	0	0	6	13	22	0
Kenya	3	0	0	1	0	4	12	0
Boxscore

Set 2

3 November 12:00 (GMT) Complexe Tour de L'Œuf
Team	1	2	3	4	5	R	H	E
Mexico	1	1	0	0	0	2	10	0
Kenya	1	1	0	0	1	3	11	0
Boxscore

Set 3

3 November 12:00 (GMT) Complexe Tour de L'Œuf
Team	1	2	3	4	5	R	H	E
Mexico	5	0	0	2	0	7	11	0
Kenya	0	0	0	1	1	2	12	0
Boxscore

=== Gold medal game ===
Set 1

3 November 12:00 (GMT) Complexe Tour de L'Œuf
Team	1	2	3	4	5	R	H	E
Chinese Taipei	0	1	0	0	0	1	6	0
Cuba	1	0	1	0	X	2	8	1
Boxscore

Set 2

3 November 12:00 (GMT) Complexe Tour de L'Œuf
Team	1	2	3	4	5	R	H	E
Chinese Taipei	0	1	0	0	0	1	5	0
Cuba	5	2	0	0	X	7	17	0
Boxscore
