= Clarisse Vallim =

Brazilian judoka (born 2010)

Personal information
- Born: 13 October 2010 (age 16)
- Occupation: Judoka

Sport
- Country: Brazil
- Sport: Judo
- Weight class: ‍–‍70 kg
Medal record
Women's judo
Representing Brazil
Pan American Junior Championships
Silver medal – second place	2026 Guayaquil	‍–‍70 kg
World Cadets Championships
Gold medal – first place	2025 Sofia	‍–‍70 kg
Gold medal – first place	2026 Guayaquil	‍–‍70 kg
Silver medal – second place	2026 Guayaquil	Mixed team
Pan American Cadet Championships
Gold medal – first place	2026 Guayaquil	‍–‍70 kg
Youth Olympic Games
Gold medal – first place	2026 Dakar	‍–‍78 kg
South American Youth Games
Gold medal – first place	2026 Panama City	‍–‍78 kg

Profile at external databases
- IJF: 90936
- JudoInside.com: 172690
- Updated on 18 November 2026

Clarisse Vallim (born 13 October 2010) is a Brazilian judoka. She is a 2026 Youth Olympic Games gold medalist and two-time World Cadets champion.

== Career ==
In August 2025, Vallim competed at the 2025 World Cadets Championships and won a gold medal in the –70 kg category. She repeated as the –70 kg category champion at the 2026 World Cadets Championships.

In April 2026, she competed at the 2026 South American Youth Games where she served as the flag bearer during the opening ceremony. She won a gold medal in –78 kg category.

In November 2026, she represented Brazil at the 2026 Summer Youth Olympics, where she was the country's only judo representative. She won a gold medal in the ‍–‍78 kg category. She defeated all three of her opponents by ippon. She was then selected to compete at the 2026 World Juniors Championships, where she will make her World Juniors Championships debut.
