= 2026 World Judo Cadets Championships =

Judo competition

2026 Judo World Judo Cadets Championships
- Venue: Arena Fedeguayas VPP
- Location: Guayaquil, Ecuador
- Dates: 20–23 August
- Competitors: 457 from 59 nations
- Total prize money: €100,000

Champions
- Mixed team: Kazakhstan (1st title)

Competition at external databases
- Links: IJF • JudoInside

The 2026 World Judo Cadets Championships was held at the Arena Fedeguayas VPP in Guayaquil, Ecuador, from 20 to 23 August 2026. A mixed team event took place on the competition's last day.

== Medal summary ==
=== Men's events ===
Event	Gold	Silver	Bronze
−50 kg	Farid Rzazade (AZE)	Adilzhan Nurbeken (KAZ)	Bekarys Kudaibergen (KAZ)
−50 kg	Farid Rzazade (AZE)	Adilzhan Nurbeken (KAZ)	Andrea Hoffmann (FRA)
−55 kg	Sebastian Teran (USA)	Narek Davtyan (ARM)	Noham Benkrouidem (FRA)
−55 kg	Sebastian Teran (USA)	Narek Davtyan (ARM)	Bobur Yusupov (UZB)
−60 kg	Rassulkhan Gabit (KAZ)	Roman Semyrozum (CAN)	Akhmet Baubek (KAZ)
−60 kg	Rassulkhan Gabit (KAZ)	Roman Semyrozum (CAN)	Enkhtur Jamiyan (MGL)
−66 kg	Anes Mati (CAN)	Giorgi Kapanadze (GEO)	Tom Simkhaev (ISR)
−66 kg	Anes Mati (CAN)	Giorgi Kapanadze (GEO)	Yerik Ussenov (KAZ)
−73 kg	Genki Fujinaka (JPN)	Giorgi Mtchedlishvili (GEO)	Bekali Yerken (KAZ)
−73 kg	Genki Fujinaka (JPN)	Giorgi Mtchedlishvili (GEO)	Bekhruzbek Usmonov (UZB)
−81 kg	Daniial Biibolatov (RUS)	Aykhan Hasanli (AZE)	Aleks Krivec (SLO)
−81 kg	Daniial Biibolatov (RUS)	Aykhan Hasanli (AZE)	Rustam Kashipov (RUS)
−90 kg	Artem Nikulin (RUS)	Jurabek Eshpulatov (UZB)	Aslan Tuaev (RUS)
−90 kg	Artem Nikulin (RUS)	Jurabek Eshpulatov (UZB)	Matthew Molchanov (CAN)
+90 kg	Adilzhan Zhaudinov (KAZ)	Abdulmanaf Ramazanov (RUS)	Tsvetomir Valkov (BUL)
+90 kg	Adilzhan Zhaudinov (KAZ)	Abdulmanaf Ramazanov (RUS)	Marko Vujica (CRO)

=== Women's events ===
Event	Gold	Silver	Bronze
−40 kg	Iroda Sirojiddinova (UZB)	Adiya Zhanakhmet (KAZ)	Ana Mikaele Alcântara (BRA)
−40 kg	Iroda Sirojiddinova (UZB)	Adiya Zhanakhmet (KAZ)	Emiliia Saifutdinova (RUS)
−44 kg	Regina Akhtiamova (RUS)	Sema Nur Yüksel (TUR)	Alina Kolucheva (UZB)
−44 kg	Regina Akhtiamova (RUS)	Sema Nur Yüksel (TUR)	Julia Błaszczyk (POL)
−48 kg	Ella Barlev (ISR)	Maëlys Dapa (BEL)	Charos Hikmatova (UZB)
−48 kg	Ella Barlev (ISR)	Maëlys Dapa (BEL)	Agam Sol Noy (ISR)
−52 kg	Fatima Supygaliyeva (KAZ)	Kseniia Kyrylchuk (UKR)	Rio Shirakane (JPN)
−52 kg	Fatima Supygaliyeva (KAZ)	Kseniia Kyrylchuk (UKR)	Sofia Gaspar (POR)
−57 kg	Jagoda Ciupek (POL)	Inzhu Zhumazhan (KAZ)	Nicole Daria Manaila (CAN)
−57 kg	Jagoda Ciupek (POL)	Inzhu Zhumazhan (KAZ)	Yura Obikane (JPN)
−63 kg	Jolina Reinhold (GER)	Bleona Rama (AUT)	Ilariia Tsurkan (SLO)
−63 kg	Jolina Reinhold (GER)	Bleona Rama (AUT)	Aki Asada (JPN)
−70 kg	Clarisse Vallim (BRA)	Valerie Tombou (BEL)	Momoka Takeda (JPN)
−70 kg	Clarisse Vallim (BRA)	Valerie Tombou (BEL)	Diana Samoiliuk (UKR)
+70 kg	Anna Zheleva (RUS)	Hatice Tuana Balcı (TUR)	Astan Sacko (FRA)
+70 kg	Anna Zheleva (RUS)	Hatice Tuana Balcı (TUR)	Kanon Okada (JPN)

=== Mixed ===
Event	Gold	Silver	Bronze
Mixed team	Kazakhstan	Brazil	Uzbekistan
Mixed team	Kazakhstan	Brazil	Mongolia

Source results:

=== Medal table ===
* Host nation (Ecuador)

Rank	Nation	Gold	Silver	Bronze	Total
1	Kazakhstan (KAZ)	4	3	4	11
2	Russia (RUS)	4	1	3	8
3	Uzbekistan (UZB)	1	1	5	7
4	Canada (CAN)	1	1	2	4
5	Brazil (BRA)	1	1	1	3
6	Azerbaijan (AZE)	1	1	0	2
7	Japan (JPN)	1	0	5	6
8	Israel (ISR)	1	0	2	3
9	Poland (POL)	1	0	1	2
10	Germany (GER)	1	0	0	1
10	United States (USA)	1	0	0	1
12	Belgium (BEL)	0	2	0	2
12	Georgia (GEO)	0	2	0	2
12	Turkey (TUR)	0	2	0	2
15	Ukraine (UKR)	0	1	1	2
16	Armenia (ARM)	0	1	0	1
16	Austria (AUT)	0	1	0	1
18	France (FRA)	0	0	3	3
19	Mongolia (MGL)	0	0	2	2
19	Slovenia (SLO)	0	0	2	2
21	Bulgaria (BUL)	0	0	1	1
21	Croatia (CRO)	0	0	1	1
21	Portugal (POR)	0	0	1	1
Totals (23 entries)		17	17	34	68

== Prize money ==
The sums written are per medalist, bringing the total prizes awarded to €80,000 for the individual contests and €20,000 for the team competition. (retrieved from:)

Medal	Individual			Mixed team		
Medal	Total	Judoka	Coach	Total	Judoka	Coach
Gold	€2,300	€1,840	€460	€8,000	€6,400	€1,600
Silver	€1,300	€1,040	€260	€5,600	€4,480	€1,120
Bronze	€700	€560	€140	€3,200	€2,560	€640
