= Nicaragua at the 2026 Summer Youth Olympics =

- Flag of Nicaragua
- IOC code: NCA
- NOC: Nicaragua Olympic Committee

in Dakar, Senegal October 31, 2026 – November 13, 2026
- Competitors: 5 in 4 sports
- Flag bearers: Sophia Zapata & Justin Barrios
- Medals: Gold 0 Silver 0 Bronze 0 Total 0

Summer Youth Olympics appearances
- 2010; 2014; 2018; 2026

Nicaagua is scheduled to compete at the 2026 Summer Youth Olympics in Dakar, Senegal from October 31 to November 13, 2026. This will mark Nicaragua's fourth appearance at the Youth Olympics, after making its debut in 2010.

Swimmer Sophia Zapata and beach volleyball player Justin Barrios served as the flag bearers for the opening ceremony.

== Competitors ==
The following is the list of number of competitors participating at the Games per sport/discipline.

Sport	Men	Women	Total
Athletics	0	1	1
Beach volleyball	2	0	2
Judo	0	1	1
Swimming	0	1	1
Total	2	3	5

== Athletics ==
Nicaragua entered one female athlete.

=== Track & road events ===
Women

Athlete	Event	Heat		Semifinal		Final	
Athlete	Event	Result	Rank	Result	Rank	Result	Rank
Shelly Reyes	100 m						

== Beach volleyball ==
Nicaragua received a quota place for the men's tournament.

Summary

Team	Event	Group stage				Round of 16	Quarterfinals	Semifinals	Final / PG / BM	
Team	Event	Opposition Result	Opposition Result	Opposition Result	Rank	Opposition Result	Opposition Result	Opposition Result	Opposition Result	Rank
Justin Barrios; Matthew Kempf	Men's tournament									

== Judo ==
Nicaragua entered one female judoka based on the available quotas assigned by the International Judo Federation.

Women

Athlete	Event	Round of 16	Quarterfinals	Semifinals	Repechage	Final / BM	
Athlete	Event	Opposition Result	Opposition Result	Opposition Result	Opposition Result	Opposition Result	Rank
Ashly Herrera	-78 kg						

== Swimming ==
Nicaragua entered one female swimmer.

Athlete	Event	Heat		Semifinal		Final	
Athlete	Event	Time	Rank	Time	Rank	Time	Rank
Sophia Zapata	50 m backstroke						
