= 2026 South American Youth Games =

Sports event in Panama City, Panama

- Nations: 15
- Athletes: +2000
- Events: 24 sports
- Opening: 12 April 2026
- Closing: 25 April 2026
- Website: https://www.jsjpanama2026.com/

The 2026 South American Youth Games (Spanish: Juegos Suramericanos de la Juventud 2026), officially the IV South American Youth Games, is an international multi-sport event held in Panama City, Panama, from 12 to 25 April 2026.

It is the first time for the event to be held in Panama. Intended for athletes from 14 to 17 years of age, it included over 2000 athletes from 15 nations.

== Background ==
Originally scheduled to be held in San Luis, Argentina, on 15 April 2024, it was announced by Gabriel Rivero, San Luis Sports Secretary, that the city would no longer host neither the South American Youth Games nor the 2026 Basque Pelota World Championships, attributing it to the high economic costs that organizing the events would demand. On 20 February 2025, after months of planning, it was announced by the Panama Olympic Committee that Panama City would take over as the host city for the games.

== Venues ==
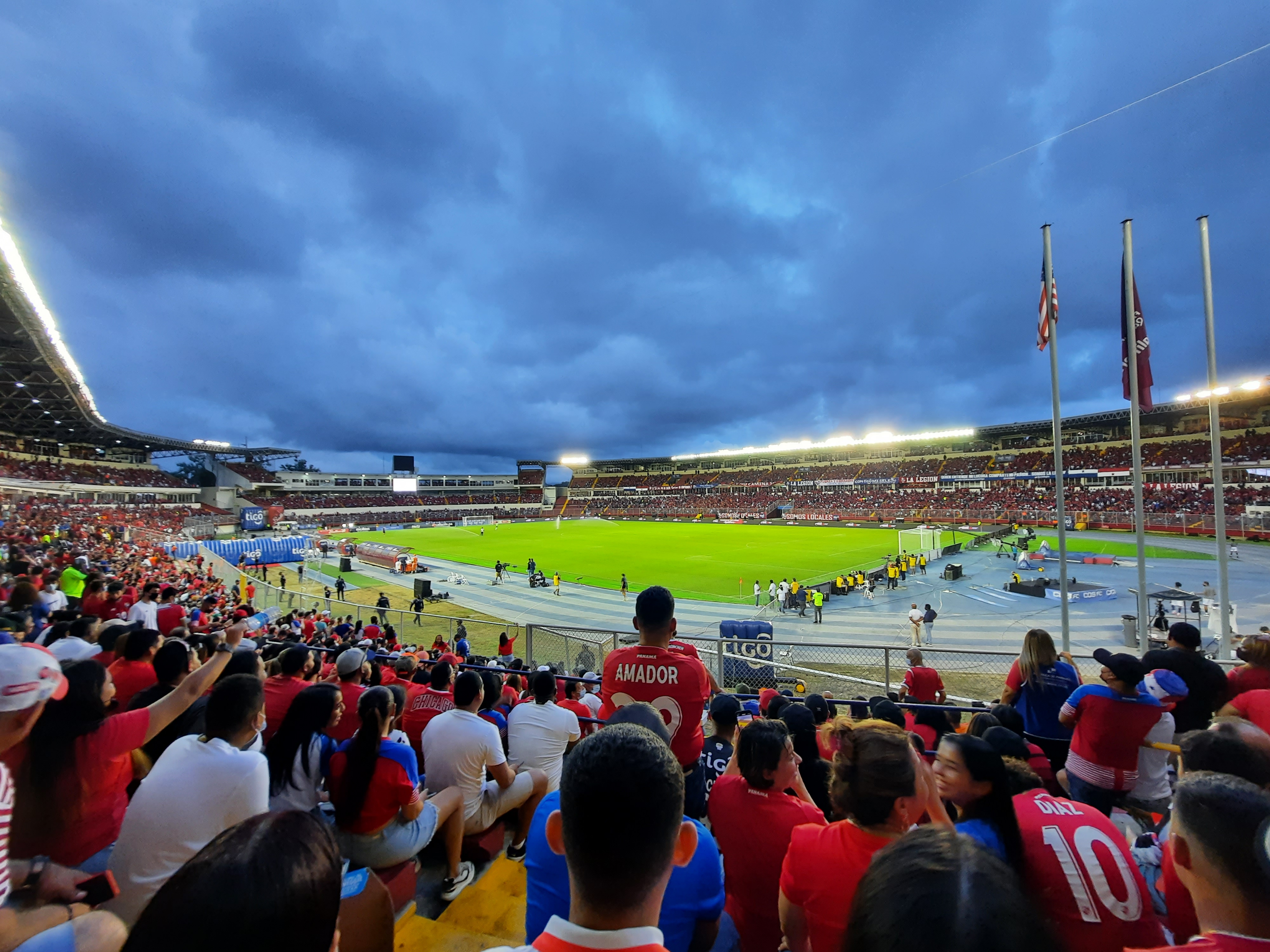
Inside view of Rommel Fernández Stadium, where the opening ceremony will take place.

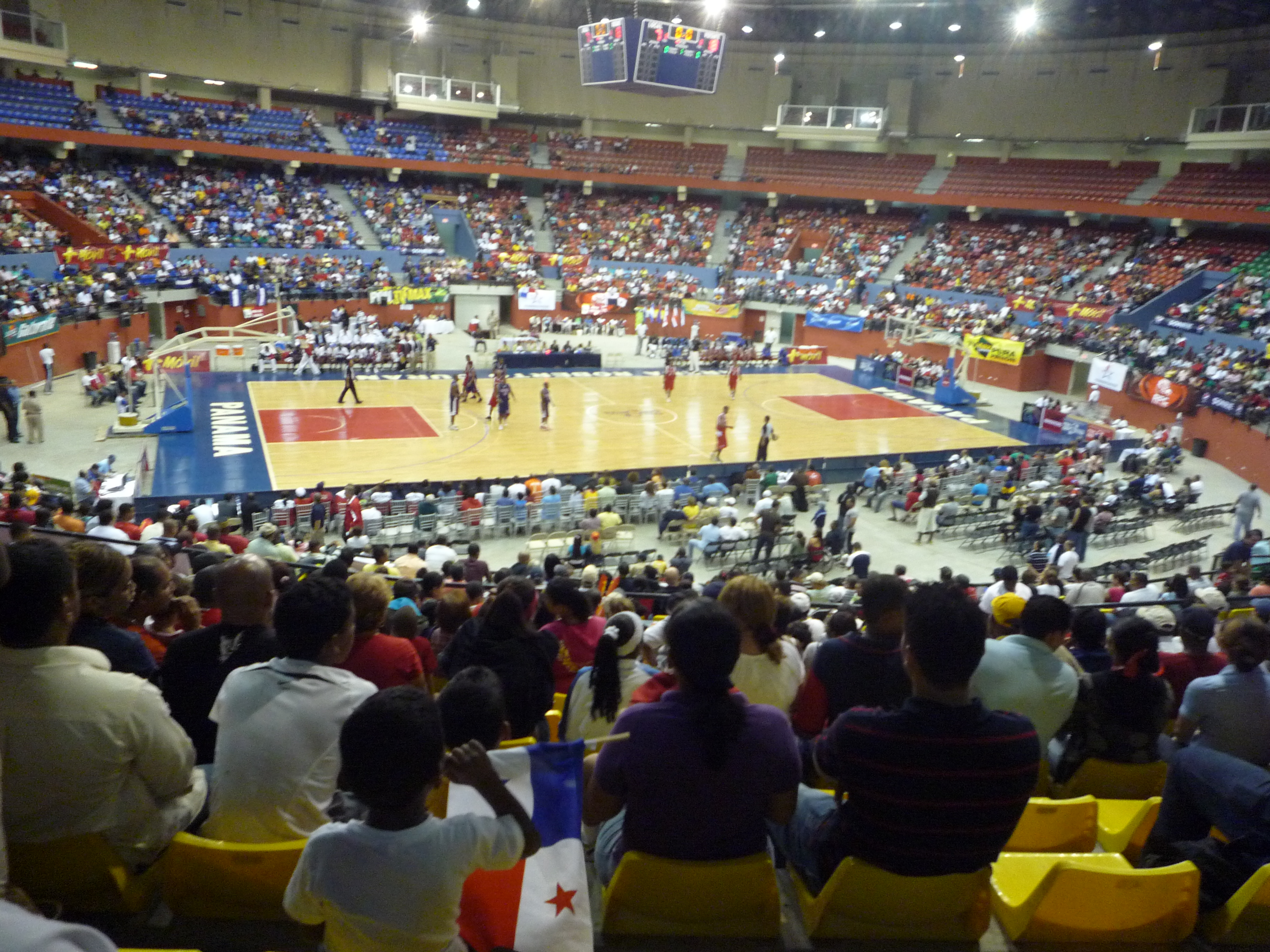
Futsal and karate will take place at Roberto Durán Arena, within Ciudad Deportiva Irving Saladino.

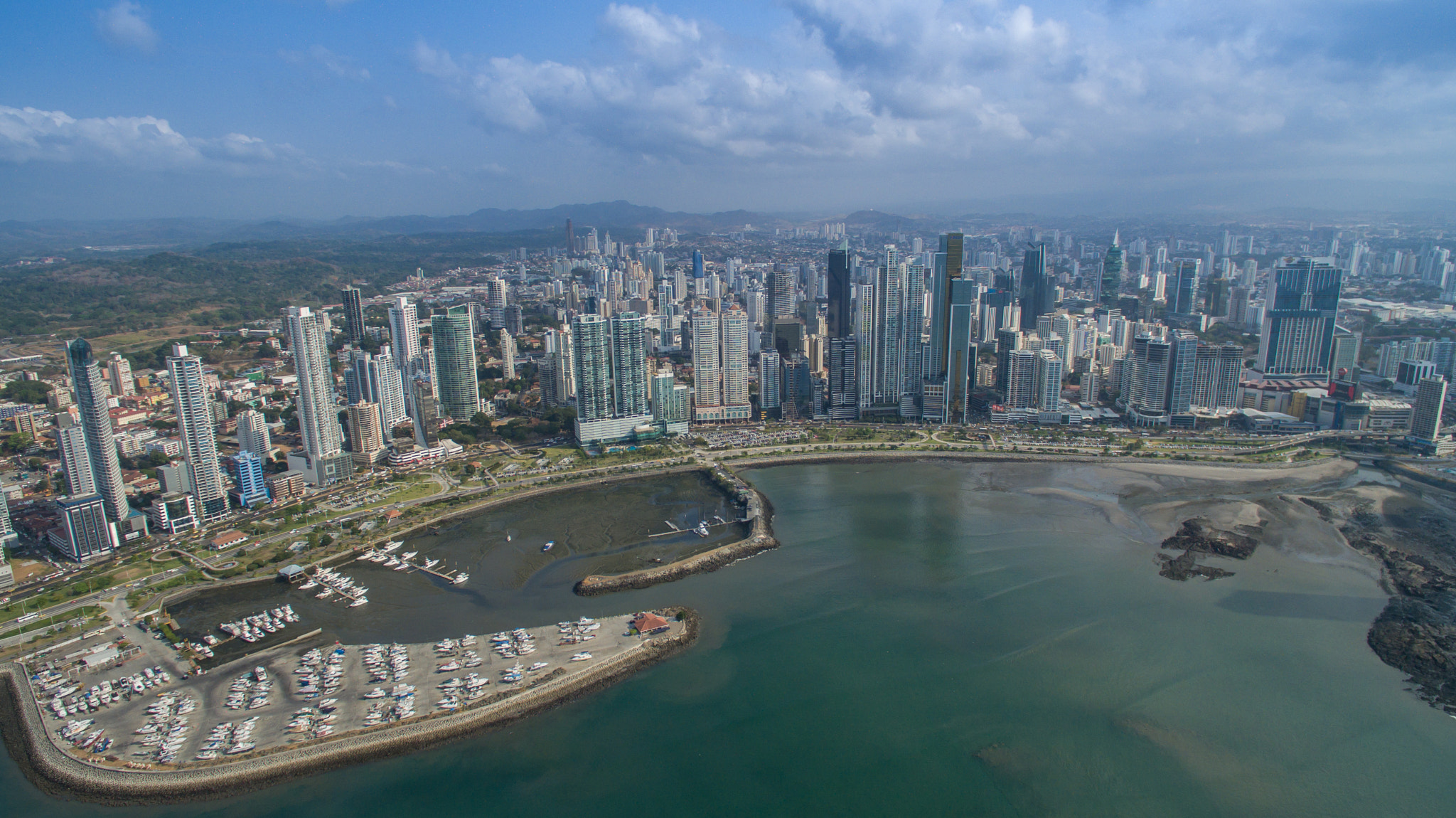
Air view of Cinta Costera, where the cycling events will take place.

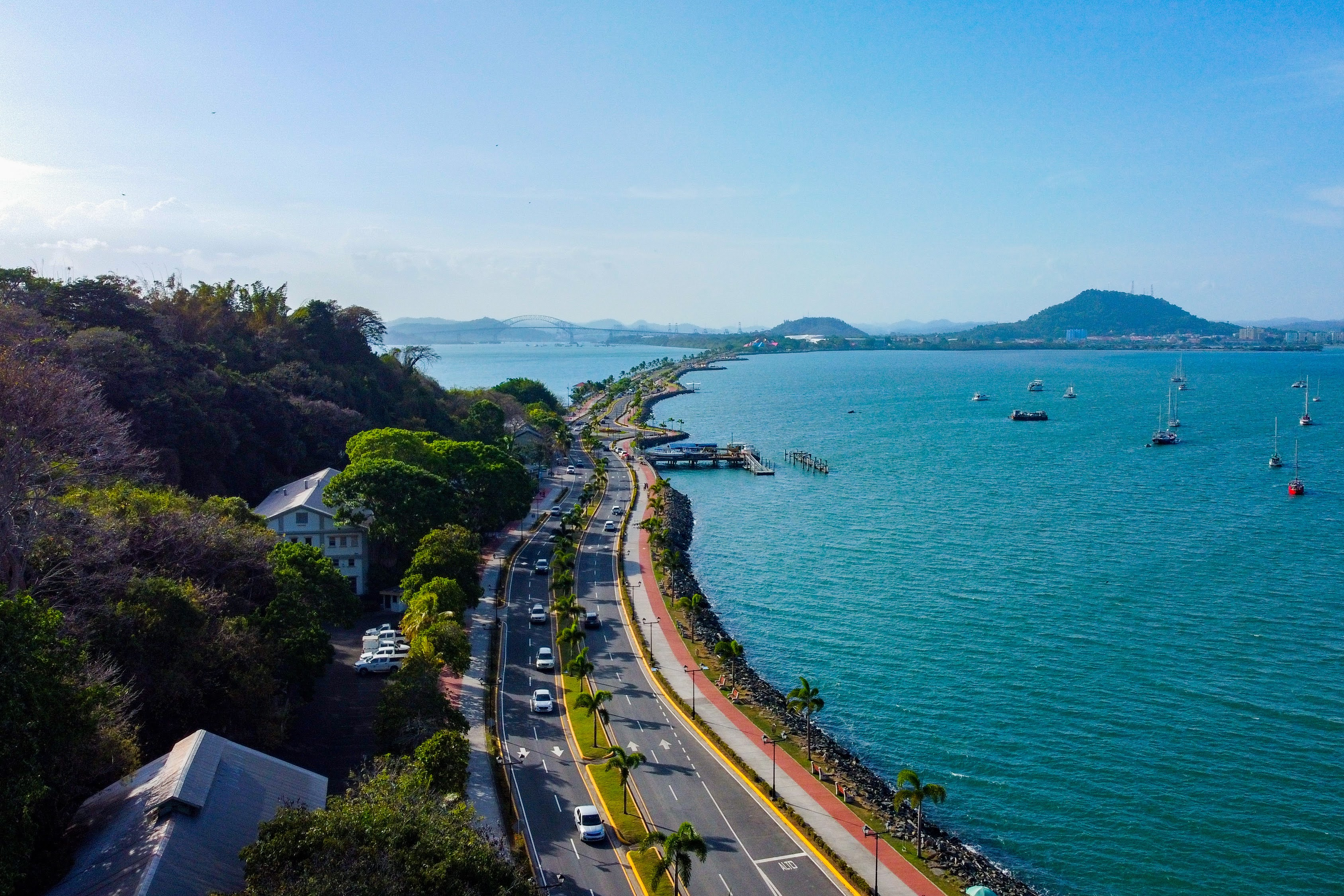
Triathlon will take place at Causeway Islands.

Venue		Sports
Ciudad Deportiva Irving Saladino	Rommel Fernández Stadium	Opening ceremony Athletics (track); Football
Ciudad Deportiva Irving Saladino	Roberto Durán Arena	Closing ceremony Futsal; Karate
Ciudad Deportiva Irving Saladino	Emilio Royo Stadium	Flag football
Ciudad Deportiva Irving Saladino	Campo de Tiro con Arco	Archery
Ciudad Deportiva Irving Saladino	Centro de Combate	Taekwondo; Judo
Centro de Alto Rendimiento del Deporte	Centro Acuático Olímpico	Swimming
Centro de Alto Rendimiento del Deporte	Gimnasio Polideportivo	Wrestling; Weightlifting
Centro de Alto Rendimiento del Deporte	Centro de Combates CAR	Badminton; Table tennis
Centro de Alto Rendimiento del Deporte	Pista de Atletismo	Athletics (field)
Centro de Alto Rendimiento del Deporte	Cancha de Fútbol	Football
Cinta Costera	Centro de Convenciones Figali	Gymnastics
Cinta Costera	Centro de Tierra de Campeones Atheyna Bylon	Boxing; Fencing
Cinta Costera	Cinta Costera	Cycling
Cinta Costera	Mirador del Pacífico	Basketball 3x3
Cinta Costera	Causeway Islands	Triathlon
Independent venues	Club de Golf de Panamá	Golf
Independent venues	Centro de Tenis Fred Maduro	Tennis
Independent venues	Venao Beach	Surf
Independent venues	Juan Demóstenes Arosemena Stadium	Baseball

== The Games ==
=== Sports ===
The sports program includes 24 sports. For the 2026 edition, the following disciplines were added: baseball, flag football, football, surf and chess. Sports included for the previous editions but dropped for the present were beach handball, beach volleyball, climbing, field hockey, artistic roller skating, inline speed skating, rugby sevens and skateboarding.

- 3x3 basketball (2)
- Archery (10)
- Athletics (39)
- Badminton (5)
- Baseball (1)
- Boxing (11)
- Chess (4)
- Cycling (4)
- Fencing (7)
- Flag football (2)
- Football (2)
- Futsal (2)
- Golf (3)
- Gymnastics (14)
- Judo (8)
- Karate (8)
- Table tennis (3)
- Taekwondo (13)
- Tennis (5)
- Triathlon (3)
- Surfing (7)
- Swimming (36)
- Weightlifting (12)
- Wrestling (14)

=== Participating teams ===
All 15 nations of the Organización Deportiva Suramericana (ODESUR) are expected to compete in these Youth Games.

- Argentina (248)
- Aruba (10)
- Bolivia (109)
- Brazil (247)
- Chile (155)
- Colombia (180)
- Curaçao (37)
- Ecuador (97)
- Guyana (29)
- Panama (246) (host)
- Paraguay (147)
- Peru (141)
- Suriname (11)
- Uruguay (70)
- Venezuela (179)

== Calendar ==
OC	Opening ceremony	●	Event competitions	1	Event finals	CC	Closing ceremony

April	12 Sun	13 Mon	14 Tue	15 Wed	16 Thu	17 Fri	18 Sat	19 Sun	20 Mon	21 Tue	22 Wed	23 Thu	24 Fri	25 Sat	Medal Events
Ceremonies (opening / closing)	OC													CC	—N/a
3x3 basketball												●	●	2	2
Archery				●	●	●	10								10
Athletics											7	15	7	10	39
Badminton									●	●	●	5			5
Baseball									●	●	●	●	●	1	1
Boxing			●	●	●	●	11								11
Chess (demonstration sport)												●	2	2	4
Cycling					2		2								4
Fencing												3	3	1	7
Flag football						●	●	2							2
Football	●	●	●	●	●	●	1	1							2
Futsal		●	●	●		2									2
Golf										●	●	●	3		3
Gymnastics					●	2	12								14
Judo		2	2	2	2										8
Karate												3	3	2	8
Table tennis		●	2	●	●	1									3
Taekwondo										3	3	3	4		13
Tennis									●	●	●	2	3		5
Triathlon						2		1							3
Surfing		●	●	●	7										8
Swimming					10	10	9	7							36
Weightlifting											4	3	3	2	12
Wrestling		5	5	4											14
Total events	0	7	9	6	21	17	45	11	0	3	14	33	23	27	215
Cumulative total	0	7	16	22	43	60	105	116	119	122	136	169	192	215	N/A
April	12 Sun	13 Mon	14 Tue	15 Wed	16 Thu	17 Fri	18 Sat	19 Sun	20 Mon	21 Tue	22 Wed	23 Thu	24 Fri	25 Sat	Medal Events

== Medal table ==
* Host nation (Panama)

Rank	Nation	Gold	Silver	Bronze	Total
1	Brazil (BRA)	58	51	48	157
2	Venezuela (VEN)	33	21	29	83
3	Argentina (ARG)	32	39	34	105
4	Colombia (COL)	26	19	44	89
5	Chile (CHI)	18	15	27	60
6	Ecuador (ECU)	15	28	21	64
7	Peru (PER)	13	15	19	47
8	Panama (PAN)*	6	6	17	29
9	Uruguay (URU)	4	6	7	17
10	Guyana (GUY)	3	1	3	7
11	Paraguay (PAR)	1	8	8	17
12	Bolivia (BOL)	0	1	7	8
13	Curaçao (CUR)	0	0	1	1
Totals (13 entries)		209	210	265	684

== Medalists ==
=== 3x3 basketball ===
Event	Gold	Silver	Bronze
Boys' tournament	Uruguay; Mateo Sansberro; Luis Imas; Francisco Pereira; Brahian Gomez	Paraguay; Alejandro Talavera; Alexis Negrette; Mauricio Escurra; Luis Ortiz	Panama; Jorge Aldeano; Omario Bailey; Dylan Lemon; Saúl Guevara
Girls' tournament	Chile; Constanza Mella; Amanda Guineo; Emilia Oliva; Agustina Mella	Paraguay; Sol Ocampo; Maria Dragotto; Gabriela Bernal; Gilda Duarte	Argentina; Josefina Peralta; Rosario Menarvino; Ernestina Suárez; Amparo Arévalo

=== Archery ===
Event	Gold	Silver	Bronze
Boys' individual recurve	Gabriel Tonina; Argentina	Lucas Wudson; Brazil	Nicolás Gomez; Colombia
Girls' individual recurve	Luiza Rodrigues; Brazil	Isabella Chorvat; Argentina	Juana Cardona; Colombia
Boys' team recurve	Brazil; Felipe Fogliarini; Lucas Wudson	Argentina; Thiago Barbieri; Gabriel Tonina	Colombia; Cristóbal Giraldo; Nicolás Gómez
Girls' team recurve	Colombia; Juana Cardona; Salome Duque	Chile; Sabrina Nuñez; Matilda Ureta	Argentina; Isabella Chorvat; Bianca González
Mixed team recurve	Argentina; Isabella Chorvat; Gabriel Tonina	Peru; Penélope Bustamante; Santiago Vásquez	Colombia; Juana Cardona; Nicolás Gómez
Boys' individual compound	Juan González; Colombia	Jeronimo Agudelo; Colombia	Oscar Verdugo; Chile
Girls' individual compound	Dariana Heredia; Ecuador	María Gimenez; Argentina	Karina Arango; Colombia
Boys' team compound	Brazil; João Ferreira; João Venturini	Colombia; Juan González; Jeronimo Agudelo	Ecuador; Matías Ávila; Julián Jumbo
Girls' team compound	Colombia; Julieta Tobón; Karina Arango	Ecuador; María Davila; Dariana Heredia	Chile; Victoria Gálvez; Javiera Chacón
Mixed team compound	Colombia; Karina Arango; Jeronimo Agudelo	Ecuador; Dariana Heredia; Matías Ávila	Peru; Avril Santa Cruz; Kenshi Atto

=== Athletics ===
Boys

Event	Gold	Silver	Bronze
100 m	Ezekiel Millington; Guyana	Gordon Thompson; Guyana	Franco Stefoni; Chile
200 m	Deuquan Farrell; Guyana	Mateus Mendez; Ecuador	Pedro de Araujo; Brazil
400 m	Kevin Aguero; Brazil	Richard Peña; Venezuela	Sergio Rojas; Colombia
800 m	Felipe Bond; Argentina	Max da Silva; Brazil	Valentín Acuña; Chile
1500 m	Thiago Goyzueta; Peru	Leymer Baño; Ecuador	Ebo McNeil; Guyana
3000 m	Juan Arévalo; Colombia	Leymer Baño; Ecuador	Bruno Nuñez; Uruguay
110 m hurdles	José Sinisterra; Colombia	Martín Casali; Chile	Gustavo Pacheco; Brazil
400 m hurdles	Mateus Mendez; Ecuador	Donny Morquecho; Ecuador	Juan Torrealba; Chile
2000 m steeplechase	Thiago Goyzueta; Peru	Bruno Nuñez; Uruguay	Erick Guerrero; Ecuador
5 km walk	George Espinoza; Peru	Jessi Chacón; Venezuela	Santino Reynoso; Argentina
High jump	Naftaly Magalhaes; Brazil	Lucas Silva; Brazil	Ernesto Carabali; Ecuador
Long jump	Pedro Olmos; Argentina	João Fernandes; Brazil	Nicolás Seydewitz; Chile
Triple jump	Nicolas da Silva; Brazil	Nicolás Seydewitz; Chile	Guilherme dos Santos; Brazil
Shot put	Pyetro Souza; Brazil	Gabriel Leite; Brazil	Mateo Palomino; Colombia
Discus throw	Vittorio Gorziglia; Chile	Henthonny Moraes; Brazil	Julián González; Chile
Hammer throw	Patry Valdez; Ecuador	Jose de Almeida; Brazil	Abilio Barbosa; Brazil
Javelin throw	Dilan Graciano; Colombia	Pedro da Silva; Brazil	Marko Kaethler; Paraguay
4 × 100 m relay	Guyana; David Williams; Gordon Thompson; Ezekiel Millington; Ade Sealy; Deuquan Farrell	Chile; Martin Casali; Mateo Fernández; Tomás Peñaloza; Franco Stefoni; Nicolás Valdivia	Brazil; Nicolas da Silva; Rafael Brigano; Gustavo Gomes; Joao Fernandes; Johnata Moura; Pedro de Araujo

Girls

Event	Gold	Silver	Bronze
100 m	Roxana Ramírez; Chile	Olivia Conesa; Argentina	Emily Román; Colombia
200 m	Roxana Ramírez; Chile	Olivia Conesa; Argentina	Dayara Tovar; Colombia
400 m	Waleska Ortiz; Venezuela	Daniela Castro; Ecuador	Dilany Melo; Venezuela
800 m	Valentina Cancino; Chile	Aurelia Loroño; Chile	Thais Azarias; Brazil
1500 m	Valentina Cancino; Chile	Zoe Gorski; Argentina	Nicole Herdy; Brazil
3000 m	Zoe Gorski; Argentina	Irene Pernia; Argentina	Danna Rizo; Colombia
100 m hurdles	Juliana Rodríguez; Colombia	Wanda Arizala; Colombia	Sahra Boada; Venezuela
400 m hurdles	Michel Gómez; Colombia	Gloria Cañola; Ecuador	Larissa Schon; Brazil
2000 m steeplechase	Antonella Bonomi; Uruguay	Eloisa Fuchslocher; Chile	Ana Domingues; Brazil
High jump	Jeraldine Pata; Ecuador	Maria Belmonte; Brazil	Not awarded
High jump	Jeraldine Pata; Ecuador	María Montes; Chile	Not awarded
Pole vault	Oriana Saavedra; Venezuela	Juana Echeverría; Argentina	Ana León; Venezuela
Long jump	Alexandra Segura; Ecuador	Sahra Boada; Venezuela	Domenica Crose; Peru
Triple jump	Yoglannys Arenas; Venezuela	Samara Boada; Venezuela	Alexandra Segura; Ecuador
Shot put	Maria Maier; Brazil	Marya da Silva; Brazil	Ornela Pérez; Argentina
Discus throw	Isabel Sánchez; Venezuela	Giovana Reia; Brazil	Ana Salinas; Bolivia
Hammer throw	Maria da Fonseca; Brazil	Ashly Hinestroza; Colombia	Juana Marino; Argentina
Javelin throw	Ilsa Córdoba; Colombia	Narcisa Medina; Ecuador	Aura Ramos; Venezuela
4 × 100 m relay	Colombia; Emily Román; Juliana Rodríguez; Wanda Arizala; Dayara Tovar	Paraguay; Jimena Sostoa; Heidi Pigisch; Lara González; Naira Wiebe	Peru; Isabel Quiroz; Catalina Yzaga; Domenica Crose; Romina Fiol

Mixed

Event	Gold	Silver	Bronze
4 × 400 m relay	Colombia; Sergio Rojas; Laura Alcala; José Miguel Valencia; Michel Gómez	Ecuador; Donny Morquecho; Tatiana Díaz; Mateus Mendez; Daniela Castro	Venezuela; Jesús Álvarez; Dilany Melo; Richard Peña; Waleska Ortiz

=== Badminton ===
Event	Gold	Silver	Bronze
Boys' singles	Guillermo Buendía; Peru	Umesh Lescano; Peru	Jerónimo Giraldo; Colombia
Boys' singles	Guillermo Buendía; Peru	Umesh Lescano; Peru	Fabricio Rodríguez; Venezuela
Girls' singles	Sofía Junco; Peru	Sofía Rodas; Paraguay	Bárbara Lamas; Venezuela
Girls' singles	Sofía Junco; Peru	Sofía Rodas; Paraguay	Paula Rodas; Paraguay
Boys' doubles	Brazil; Fhelipe Teixeira; Marcos de Almeida	Venezuela; Fabricio Rodríguez; Johalbert Laverde	Peru; Umesh Lescano; Guillermo Buendía
Boys' doubles	Brazil; Fhelipe Teixeira; Marcos de Almeida	Venezuela; Fabricio Rodríguez; Johalbert Laverde	Paraguay; Thiago Acha; Marcos Rotela
Girls' doubles	Brazil; Vivian Iha; Yasmim do Nascimento	Paraguay; Paula Rodas; Sofía Rodas	Peru; Sofía Junco; Analia Yi
Girls' doubles	Brazil; Vivian Iha; Yasmim do Nascimento	Paraguay; Paula Rodas; Sofía Rodas	Venezuela; Alexmary Zerlin; Bárbara Lamas
Mixed doubles	Peru; Guillermo Buendía; Sofía Junco	Colombia; Jerónimo Giraldo; Juliana Castaño	Venezuela; Fabricio Rodríguez; Bárbara Lamas
Mixed doubles	Peru; Guillermo Buendía; Sofía Junco	Colombia; Jerónimo Giraldo; Juliana Castaño	Chile; Felipe Canario; Josefina Reyes

=== Baseball ===
Event	Gold	Silver	Bronze
Boys' tournament	Panama; Adrián Fuentes; Eduardo Canto; Daniel Brown; Jonathan Ramos; Luis Atencio; Danel Long; Omar Osorio; Jesús Arosemena; Yeremy de León; Jaffeth Florez; Edward Delgado; Anderson Cousins; Santiago Mendoza; Luis Aranda; Alejandro Fanovich; Lucas Lopez; Abel Rodríguez; Johan Camarena; Eddie Miller; Alexis Govea	Colombia; Dylan Jaraba; Luis Sarabia; Julián Florez; Jeddy Robinsob; Sebastián Solano; Emmanuel Cavadia; José Bula; Nicolás Cordero; Steven Cardozi; Henry Carrillo; Luis Garrido; Sebastián Barrios; Javier Ramos; Rafael Castillo; Adel Gonzalez; Enrique Sánchez; Keyner Cárdenas; Einer Guzmán; Wilson Ocampo; Santiago Noguera	Curaçao; Reangelo Hortencia; Zion Cijntje; Victor Nieves; Jayden Elizabeth; Jayden Martina; Claeten Sille; Dyveneau Zimmerman; Jeadyon Chirino; Nasir El-Ossaïs; Helmir Helmijr; Alexander Provacia; Tristan Meulens; Qshondrickson Doran; Jaylliard Emperador; Raishelnon Ogenia; R'Jeau Valks; Dwyane Isenia; Derickson Doran; Shemar Sophia; Jay-dlynn Wiel

=== Boxing ===
Event	Gold	Silver	Bronze
Boys' 55 kg	Gustavo Domingues; Brazil	Jeremías Manzelli; Argentina	Izzon Galea; Colombia
Boys' 55 kg	Gustavo Domingues; Brazil	Jeremías Manzelli; Argentina	Beymar López; Bolivia
Boys' 60 kg	Edgardo Peralta; Argentina	Maicon dos Santos; Brazil	Kevin Vasquez; Chile
Boys' 60 kg	Edgardo Peralta; Argentina	Maicon dos Santos; Brazil	Ken Harvey; Guyana
Boys' 65 kg	Stiven Galvis; Colombia	Daniel Barnabé; Brazil	Gabriel Marcano; Venezuela
Boys' 65 kg	Stiven Galvis; Colombia	Daniel Barnabé; Brazil	Franco Ledesma; Uruguay
Boys' 70 kg	Santiago Giménez; Argentina	Luis Yatt; Colombia	Matheus do Nascimento; Brazil
Boys' 70 kg	Santiago Giménez; Argentina	Luis Yatt; Colombia	Aquiles Moras; Chile
Boys' 80 kg	Luis Indriago; Venezuela	Angel Anchico; Ecuador	Dahel Abrines; Uruguay
Boys' 80 kg	Luis Indriago; Venezuela	Angel Anchico; Ecuador	Santino Zilli; Argentina
Boys' 90 kg	Norman Simmons; Panama	Jean Carlos do Nascimento; Brazil	Juan Garces; Ecuador
Boys' 90 kg	Norman Simmons; Panama	Jean Carlos do Nascimento; Brazil	Vigzael Valera; Venezuela
Girls' 51 kg	Grenyelis García; Venezuela	Elissandra Santos; Brazil	Halana Farfan; Peru
Girls' 51 kg	Grenyelis García; Venezuela	Elissandra Santos; Brazil	Lia Cordoba; Panama
Girls' 54 kg	Eudaliz Rodríguez; Venezuela	Sabrina Lima; Brazil	Evelyn Trejos; Colombia
Girls' 54 kg	Eudaliz Rodríguez; Venezuela	Sabrina Lima; Brazil	Ashley Cerrud; Panama
Girls' 57 kg	Sara dos Santos; Brazil	Melanie Acevedo; Argentina	Alixon Rivera; Colombia
Girls' 57 kg	Sara dos Santos; Brazil	Melanie Acevedo; Argentina	Anthonella Rivero; Venezuela
Girls' 60 kg	Maira Santos; Brazil	Giuliana Velasquez; Bolivia	Lis Nuñez; Uruguay
Girls' 60 kg	Maira Santos; Brazil	Giuliana Velasquez; Bolivia	Edmar Muñoz; Venezuela
Girls' 70 kg	Bennielis Pérez; Venezuela	Carolina de Vargas; Brazil	Fernanda Tenorio; Ecuador

=== Cycling ===
Event	Gold	Silver	Bronze
Boys' road race	Eduard Ayala; Venezuela	Pedro da Silva; Brazil	Danilo Araujo; Brazil
Boys' time trial	Luciano Carrizo; Chile	Bruno da Silva; Brazil	José Posada; Colombia
Girls' road race	Estefanía Castillo; Colombia	Valeria Vargas; Colombia	Yasmin Ramos; Brazil
Girls' time trial	Alexandra Osorio; Chile	Valeria Vargas; Colombia	Maitê Coelho da Silva; Brazil

=== Fencing ===
Event	Gold	Silver	Bronze
Boys' épée	Caleb Caldito; Panama	Andrés Grageda; Chile	Diego del Moral; Venezuela
Boys' épée	Caleb Caldito; Panama	Andrés Grageda; Chile	Pedro Louzada; Brazil
Boys' foil	Ángel Martínez; Venezuela	Tomás Aguinaga; Ecuador	Rolando Di Tella; Argentina
Boys' foil	Ángel Martínez; Venezuela	Tomás Aguinaga; Ecuador	Kalleby de Castro; Brazil
Boys' sabre	Marcus Pitta; Brazil	David Salazar; Venezuela	Leonardo Nuñez; Peru
Boys' sabre	Marcus Pitta; Brazil	David Salazar; Venezuela	Salomón Anzola; Colombia
Girls' épée	Valeria Escobar; Venezuela	Pietra Roquini; Brazil	Clara Eliçabe; Argentina
Girls' épée	Valeria Escobar; Venezuela	Pietra Roquini; Brazil	Jimena Cabrera; Paraguay
Girls' foil	Astrid Bravo; Peru	Natalia Machado; Venezuela	María José Verdesoto; Colombia
Girls' foil	Astrid Bravo; Peru	Natalia Machado; Venezuela	Valentina Basso; Brazil
Girls' sabre	Emily Torrez; Venezuela	Celeste Parra; Colombia	Briana Iriarte; Bolivia
Girls' sabre	Emily Torrez; Venezuela	Celeste Parra; Colombia	Catalina Borrelli; Argentina
International mixed team (Note: Event not included in the medals table.)	(Brazil) Marcus de Lavra (Argentina) Rolando Di Tella (Chile) Victoria Caballero (Colombia) Nicolás Guevara (Ecuador) Lucianna Aroca (Argentina) Catalina Borrelli	(Venezuela) Valeria Escobar (Ecuador) Tomás Aguinaga (Bolivia) Daniel Galvez (Bolivia) Victoria Montaño (Bolivia) Briana Iriarte (Bolivia) Ronny Castillo	(Peru) Astrid Bravo (Argentina) Clara Eliçabe (Argentina) Bastián Soler (Chile) Florencia Vilches (Peru) Fabrizio Machare (Brazil) Pedro Louzada
International mixed team	(Brazil) Marcus de Lavra (Argentina) Rolando Di Tella (Chile) Victoria Caballero (Colombia) Nicolás Guevara (Ecuador) Lucianna Aroca (Argentina) Catalina Borrelli	(Venezuela) Valeria Escobar (Ecuador) Tomás Aguinaga (Bolivia) Daniel Galvez (Bolivia) Victoria Montaño (Bolivia) Briana Iriarte (Bolivia) Ronny Castillo	(Venezuela) David Salazar (Colombia) Celeste Parra (Brazil) Kalleby de Castro (Paraguay) Alejandro Acosta (Bolivia) Briana Sandoval (Colombia) María José Verdesoto

=== Flag football ===
Event	Gold	Silver	Bronze
Boys' team	Brazil; Fernando Montenegro; Ruam da Silva; Lorran da Silva; Pablo Ricardo; Leonardo de Goes; Breno de Goes; Pedro Correa; Arthur Guissoni; Guilherme Lisboa; Kaike Bandeira; Pedro de Oliveira; Nicollas Cavalcanti	Panama; Ethan Diaz; Nickolas Martínez; Samuel Arias; Diego Cedeño; Carlos Moses; Joseph Vásquez; Alessandro Cedeño; Juan Silvestre; Diego Arauz; Juan Vincensini; Kai Santiago; Ismael Jaen	Argentina; Francisco Steinborn; Felipe Lisazo; Santino Catena; Daneel Argerich; Valentín López; Joaquín Sueiro; Isao Gil; Benjamín Viale; Valentino Volgín; Mateo Liatti; Tomás Bosco; Lucas Seelig
Girls' team	Panama; Yoelkis Tuñon; Catalina Pazmiño; Isabel Maduro; Alejandra Ramos; Jade Vega; Alejandra Albo; María Castillo; Lucía Rodríguez; Andrea Muñoz; Nohelys Martínez; Jeaneth Torres; Valentina Rodrigues	Venezuela; Victoria Rojas; Natalia Figueroa; Anabella Valiente; Arantxa Sánchez; Daniella Machado; Nathalia Capriles; Sofía Fernández; Miranda Sánchez; Andrea Levanti; Arantza Pinzon; Sarah Fermín; Carlota Rodríguez	Not awarded

=== Football ===
Event	Gold	Silver	Bronze
Boys' team	Paraguay; Tiago González; Horacio González; Jhosias Núñez; Fabricio Benítez; Nicolás Britos; Imanol Amarilla; Ever Corrales; Sebastián Orué; Osmar Sosa; Brahian Leguizamón; Willian Penayo; Octavio Martínez; Oliver López; Santiago Báez; Ángel González; Enmanuel Portillo; Luciano Tartallone; Diego Centurión	Argentina; Joel Abregú; Joel Argañaraz; Juan López; Santino González; Gabriel Lovato; Martín Mauro; Mateo Arrieta; Leandro Alegre; Valentino Albornoz; Uriel Pepe; Matías Núñez; Joaquín Albornoz; Uriel Aguirre; Juan Habib; Joaquín López; Juan Aimale; Bruno Aguirre; Benjamín Domínguez	Panama; Isaias Abuabara; Cristian Ibarra; Stephen Domínguez; Arian Reyes; Lucas Norte; Ian Luca Centella; Alexander Tull; Joseph López; Thiago Chalmers; Alfredo Maduro; Joseph Choy; Adamir Aparicio; Alberto Adams; Lucio Ceballos; Giancarlo Alemán; Cristian Morán; Davis Wallace; Oliver Pinzón
Girls' team	Venezuela; Camila Pérez; Mariangeles Ávila; Brihana Monsalve; Dariana Medina; Victoria Montero; Abril Alejo; Juneski Flores; Astrid Granadillo; Camila Leal; Orliany Durán; Anabella Figueredo; Ivana Veloz; Diana Molina; Migleidys Bolsegui; Natalia Bermúdez; Mara Briceño; Karla Alfonzo; Erika Bovell	Paraguay; Estefani Ruiz; Fiorella Mora; Brenda Gómez; Camila Martínez; Jazmín Rolón; Mariana Griebeler; Oriana Benítez; Victoria Ucedo; Luciana Navero; Sofía Cabrera; Mariela Acevedo; Milagros González; Lia Fariña; Natalia Miranda; Milka Mora; Analia Arias; Flor Vergara; Emma Álvarez	Colombia; Gabriela Delgadillo; Valentina Escudero; Isabella Medina; Sara Bedoya; Juana Florez; Alejandra Jurado; Andrea Montenegro; Isabella Aponte; Valentina Montenegro; Valentina Huertas; Xiomara Salamanca; Isabella Alzate; Alexandra Mosquera; Marly Trujillo; Zoe Cuevas; Mariana Cuenu; Katherine Navarro; Luisa Sanjuan

=== Futsal ===
Event	Gold	Silver	Bronze
Boys' team	Brazil; Cauã Gamba; Kaique Ferreira; Gabriel de Frein; Victor dos Santos; João Fronza; Arthur Alberton; Kauã de Souza; Cauã Farias; Jhon Domingos; Luka Berroeco; Murilo Saad; Isaac Soares; Arthur Furtado; Pietro Martins	Argentina; Enzo Meza; Felipe Ramos; Axel Barrios; Manuel Cabrera; Lorenzo Sampedro; Valentino Laino; Valentín Aguerrido; Valentino Martínez; Joaquín Pesl; Gian Lucas Soñer; Valentin Latrechiano; Santino Sánchez; Lisandro Velásquez; Milo Suárez	Paraguay; Antonio Acuña; Octavio Cáceres; Mauro Mora; Elvio Recalde; Giovanni Glitz; Oliver Sandoval; Adán Jara; Santino Baruja; Alberto Benítez; Mathias Acosta; Rubén Melgarejo; Fabrizio Cárdenas; Derlis Mora; Ángel Ramírez
Girls' team	Argentina; Kira Cirillo; Catalina Pérez; Narela Manchi; Alma Ubeda; Brenda Toffoletti; Olivia Rodil; Mía Gonzalez; Carola Wilhelm; Damaris Carabajal; Rocío Moyano; Naira Ramírez; Rocío Benítez; Victoria Cabrera; Violeta Capponi	Paraguay; Leryn Benítez; Larissa Velasquez; Pamela Mancuello; Erika Frutos; Milena Villagra; Nayeli Villalba; Jeni Torres; Lyara Gimenez; Lujan Ortiz; Paloma Pérez; Paz Pérez; Dulce Pereira; Lizzy Gonzalez; Mirna Vega	Not awarded

=== Golf ===
Event	Gold	Silver	Bronze
Boys' singles	Emilio Velez; Colombia	Samuel Trucco; Chile	Alejandro del Valle; Peru
Girls' singles	Ana Giuliano; Argentina	María Tablante; Venezuela	Alexa Vegas; Peru
Mixed team	Colombia; Emilio Velez; Cristina Álvarez; Andrés Aparicio; Sofía Araque	Peru; Alexa Vegas; Alejandro del Valle; Vasco Gutiérrez; Michelle Miranda	Chile; Manuela Acedes; Constanza Maldonado; Diego Serrano; Samuel Trucco

=== Gymnastics ===
Boys

Event	Gold	Silver	Bronze
Team all-around	Brazil; Tiago Marson; Jose Miranda; Rafael Passos; Matheus Rodrigues; Diogo Sousa	Argentina; Lucas Aita; Julián di Pasquale; Benjamín Fernández; Benicio Manoli; Joaquín Pendino	Ecuador; Esteban Cerna; Domenick Godoy; Josué Peralta; Francisco Silva
Individual all-around	Domenick Godoy; Ecuador	Benjamín Fernández; Argentina	Matías Martínez; Chile
Floor exercise	Arturo Rossel; Chile	Matías Martínez; Chile	Benjamín Fernandez; Argentina
Pommel horse	Matías Martínez; Chile	Matías Ramos; Colombia	Maximiliano Salcedo; Colombia
Rings	Domenick Godoy; Ecuador	Matheus Rodrigues; Brazil	Diogo Sousa; Brazil
Vault	Arturo Rossel; Chile	Caleb Isava; Venezuela	Esteban Cerna; Ecuador
Vault	Arturo Rossel; Chile	Caleb Isava; Venezuela	Tiago Marson; Brazil
Parallel bars	Matías Martínez; Chile	Rafael Passos; Brazil	Tiago Marson; Brazil
Horizontal bar	Domenick Godoy; Ecuador	Josué Peralta; Ecuador	Maximiliano Salcedo; Colombia
Horizontal bar	Domenick Godoy; Ecuador	Josué Peralta; Ecuador	Matías Ramos; Colombia

Girls

Event	Gold	Silver	Bronze
Team all-around	Brazil; Ana Baptista; Sophia Carvalho; Brenda de Oliveira; Yasmin Serra; Sophia Soares	Uruguay; Camila Buck; Luana Grajales; Isabella Marenco; Marindia Nuñez; Renata Rodríguez	Argentina; Mora Arballo; Martina Begnes; Sofía Chimenti; Eugenia García; María Navarro
Individual all-around	Mia Garces; Venezuela	Isabella Marenco; Uruguay	Camila Buck; Uruguay
Vault	Eugenia García; Argentina	Yasmin Serra; Brazil	Sofía Chimenti; Argentina
Uneven bars	Mia Garces; Venezuela	Camila Buck; Uruguay	Sophia Carvalho; Brazil
Balance beam	Mia Garces; Venezuela	Ana Baptista; Brazil	Aylin Goon; Panama
Floor exercise	Isabella Marenco; Uruguay	Mía Garces; Venezuela	Eugenia García; Argentina

=== Judo ===
Event	Gold	Silver	Bronze
Boys' 55 kg	Juan Álamo; Argentina	Nelson Martínez; Venezuela	Mohammad Hauache; Brazil
Boys' 55 kg	Juan Álamo; Argentina	Nelson Martínez; Venezuela	Juan Soriano; Ecuador
Boys' 66 kg	Thiago Carvallo; Argentina	Bruno Sacilotto; Brazil	Yesus Perea; Peru
Boys' 66 kg	Thiago Carvallo; Argentina	Bruno Sacilotto; Brazil	Omar Campos; Ecuador
Boys' 81 kg	Yago Mello; Brazil	Daniel Palomino; Colombia	Jorge Natera; Venezuela
Boys' 81 kg	Yago Mello; Brazil	Daniel Palomino; Colombia	Adrián Holguín; Panama
Girls' 44 kg	Rosalvick Aguilar; Venezuela	Lalane Timbira; Brazil	Luisana Ramírez; Uruguay
Girls' 44 kg	Rosalvick Aguilar; Venezuela	Lalane Timbira; Brazil	Danna de León; Panama
Girls' 52 kg	Lavinia Igaki; Brazil	Maia Panunzio; Argentina	Maylin Bolivar; Venezuela
Girls' 52 kg	Lavinia Igaki; Brazil	Maia Panunzio; Argentina	Ayinko Toloza; Chile
Girls' 63 kg	Manuela Maia; Brazil	Yatnelis Rodríguez; Venezuela	Danna Cantoñi; Colombia
Girls' 63 kg	Manuela Maia; Brazil	Yatnelis Rodríguez; Venezuela	Uma Valdez; Argentina
Girls' 78 kg	Clarisse Vallim; Brazil	Sharol Angulo; Colombia	Prizzila Lam; Peru
Girls' 78 kg	Clarisse Vallim; Brazil	Sharol Angulo; Colombia	Saori Mattey; Venezuela

=== Karate ===
Event	Gold	Silver	Bronze
Boys' 61 kg	Jaykel Bucaram; Ecuador	Santiago Gallardo; Argentina	Ahysmar Petterson; Panama
Boys' 61 kg	Jaykel Bucaram; Ecuador	Santiago Gallardo; Argentina	Leonardo Vargas; Bolivia
Boys' 68 kg	Lucas da Silva; Brazil	Mathias Vera; Ecuador	Ian Mata; Panama
Boys' 68 kg	Lucas da Silva; Brazil	Mathias Vera; Ecuador	Ignacio Leverton; Chile
Boys' +68 kg	Lisandro Fontana; Argentina	Henry Viveros; Colombia	Luan Florenco; Brazil
Boys' +68 kg	Lisandro Fontana; Argentina	Henry Viveros; Colombia	Matías Paredez; Bolivia
Girls' 53 kg	Annabella Acevedo; Venezuela	Dessire Frias; Panama	Violeta Carvajal; Colombia
Girls' 53 kg	Annabella Acevedo; Venezuela	Dessire Frias; Panama	Alexa Moncada; Ecuador
Girls' 59 kg	Katherin Perea; Ecuador	Isabel Mendoza; Panama	Scarleth Reveco; Chile
Girls' 59 kg	Katherin Perea; Ecuador	Isabel Mendoza; Panama	Bruna de Andrade; Brazil
Girls' +59 kg	Samanta Pereira; Brazil	Gabriela Loor; Ecuador	Myhellen Alvarado; Chile
Girls' +59 kg	Samanta Pereira; Brazil	Gabriela Loor; Ecuador	Carol Acosta; Colombia
Boys' kata	Enzo Quintana; Venezuela	Facundo Aguirre; Argentina	Akilys Cardoso; Brazil
Boys' kata	Enzo Quintana; Venezuela	Facundo Aguirre; Argentina	Manuel Morales; Panama
Girls' kata	Andrea Moros; Venezuela	Ana Fedalto; Brazil	Emily Cortes; Chile
Girls' kata	Andrea Moros; Venezuela	Ana Fedalto; Brazil	Annette Vargas; Colombia

=== Surfing ===
Event	Gold	Silver	Bronze
Boys' bodyboard	Lucciano Campos; Peru	Andre Barros; Brazil	Juan Giannini; Argentina
Boys' shortboard	Yuri Gabryel; Brazil	Romeo Chávez; Colombia	Mike Prada; Venezuela
Boys' SUP surf	Pedro Veiga; Brazil	Joaquín Rosato; Argentina	Romeo Chávez; Colombia
Girls' bodyboard	Hannah Saavedra; Peru	Isabella Assmann; Argentina	Manuella Giacomassi; Brazil
Girls' shortboard	Catalina Zaraquiey; Peru	Luara Mandelli; Brazil	Shakti Martínez; Panama
Girls' SUP race	Rebeka Klotz; Brazil	Delfina Rodríguez; Argentina	Emilia Ezcurra; Peru
Girls' SUP surf	Antonia Gutiérrez; Chile	María Conterno; Peru	Rebeka Klotz; Brazil

=== Swimming ===
Boys

Event	Gold	Silver	Bronze
50 m freestyle	Celso Ferreira; Brazil	Matías Chaillou; Argentina	Dennis Pérez; Venezuela
100 m freestyle	Matías Chaillou; Argentina	Celso Ferreira; Brazil	Dennis Pérez; Venezuela
200 m freestyle	Lucas dos Santos; Brazil	Máximo Aguilar; Argentina	Nicolás Kokidko; Colombia
400 m freestyle	Caua Lopes; Brazil	Domenico Sotomayor; Peru	Thiago Pizzini; Argentina
1500 m freestyle	Caua Lopes; Brazil	Thiago Pizzini; Argentina	Mateo Mayer; Argentina
50 m backstroke	Davi Vallim; Brazil	Arthur Werner; Brazil	Matías Chaillou; Argentina
100 m backstroke	Davi Vallim; Brazil	Matías Chaillou; Argentina	Arthur Werner; Brazil
200 m backstroke	Davi Vallim; Brazil	Ciro Conrad; Argentina	Matías Ramírez; Colombia
50 m breaststroke	Kaua Santos; Brazil	Raúl Antadillas; Panama	Juan Diego León; Ecuador
100 m breaststroke	Kaua Santos; Brazil	Juan Diego León; Ecuador	Raúl Antadillas; Panama
200 m breaststroke	Kaua Santos; Brazil	Davi dos Santos; Brazil	Juan Diego León; Ecuador
50 m butterfly	Celso Ferreira; Brazil	Davi Vallim; Brazil	Matías Chaillou; Argentina
100 m butterfly	Davi Vallim; Brazil	Celso Ferreira; Brazil	Matías Chaillou; Argentina
200 m butterfly	Pedro Oliveira; Brazil	Artur Figueiredo; Brazil	Nicolás Kokidko; Colombia
200 m individual medley	Davi Vallim; Brazil	Pedro Oliveira; Brazil	Matías Mejías; Chile
4 × 100 m freestyle relay	Brazil; Artur Figueiredo; Artur Werner; Pedro Oliveira; Celso Ferreira; Davi Vallim; Kaua Lopes; Lucas dos Santos	Argentina; Lautaro Lamberti; Laureano Hopmeier; Joaquín Giovacchini; Felipe García; Máximo Aguilar; Matías Chaillou; Ciro Conrad	Venezuela; José Vargas; Juan Gomez; Dennis Pérez; Carlos Idler; Diego Caruci
4 × 100 m medley relay	Brazil; Davi dos Santos; Artur Figueiredo; Arthur Werner; Celso Ferreira; Davi Vallim; Kaua Santos; Kaua Lopes	Argentina; Ciro Conrad; Felipe García; Luis Fontana; Laureano Hopmeier; Máximo Aguilar; Matías Chaillou	Venezuela; Angelo Toscano; Gamal Kabchi; Diego Caruci; Carlos Idler; Juan Gomez; Dennis Pérez; José Vargas; Gustavo Idrogo

Girls

Event	Gold	Silver	Bronze
50 m freestyle	Laila Chain; Argentina	Angelica Solari; Uruguay	Carolina Rojas; Colombia
100 m freestyle	Angelica Solari; Uruguay	Joice Otero; Brazil	Carolina Rojas; Colombia
200 m freestyle	Agostina Hein; Argentina	Carolina Rodrigues; Brazil	Paola Azzato; Venezuela
400 m freestyle	Agostina Hein; Argentina	Malena Santillán; Argentina	Manuela Scaldini; Brazil
800 m freestyle	Agostina Hein; Argentina	Malena Santillán; Argentina	Manuela Scaldini; Brazil
50 m backstroke	Cecilia Diekele; Argentina	Laila Chain; Argentina	Renata Branchi; Brazil
100 m backstroke	Cecilia Diekele; Argentina	Laila Chain; Argentina	Sophia de Andrade; Brazil
200 m backstroke	Malena Santillán; Argentina	Cecilia Dieleke; Argentina	Maria Krupacz; Brazil
50 m breaststroke	Stefany Costa; Brazil	Rayssa de Souza; Brazil	Victoria Edgar; Ecuador
100 m breaststroke	Rayssa de Souza; Brazil	Stefany Costa; Brazil	Victoria Edgar; Ecuador
200 m breaststroke	Rayssa de Souza; Brazil	Stefany Costa; Brazil	Joaquina Negrete; Chile
50 m butterfly	Sophia de Andrade; Brazil	Joice Otero; Brazil	Guadalupe Angiolini; Argentina
100 m butterfly	Agostina Hein; Argentina	Laila Chain; Argentina	Joice Otero; Brazil
200 m butterfly	Agostina Hein; Argentina	Yasmin Silva; Peru	Ana Julia Aguiar; Brazil
200 m individual medley	Agostina Hein; Argentina	Laila Chain; Argentina	Manuela Scaldini; Brazil
4 × 100 m freestyle relay	Argentina; Malena Santillán; Guadalupe Angiolini; Catalina dos Santos; Mia di Pace; Agostina Hein	Brazil; Ana Julia Aguiar; Beatriz Cavalheiro; Joice Otero; Sophia de Andrade	Colombia; María Becerra; María Agudelo; Carolina Rojas; Sophia Richard
4 × 100 m medley relay	Argentina; Mía di Pace; Luciana Veron; Pía Ponzo; Malena Santillán; Laila Chain; Liz dos Santos; Cecilia Dieleke; Agostina Hein	Brazil; Maria Krupacz; Beatriz Cavalheiro; Sophia de Andrade; Rayssa de Souza; Ana Julia Aguiar; Joice Otero; Renata Branchi; Stefany Costa	Venezuela; Angelina Pirca; Paola Azzato; Paula Hernández; Valeria Chacón; Lisfrancys Cayones; Ana Verde

Mixed

Event	Gold	Silver	Bronze
4 × 100 m freestyle relay	Argentina; Laureano Hopmeier; Malena Santillán; Guadalupe Angiolini; Lautaro Lamberti; Máximo Aguilar; Catalina dos Santos; Matías Chaillou; Agostina Hein	Venezuela; Carlos Idler; Valeria Chacón; Paula Hernández; Juan Gomez; Dennis Pérez; Ana Verde	Colombia; Omar Crueche; Thomas Alsina; María Becerra; Nicolás Kokidko; Matías Ramírez; Carolina Rojas; Sophia Richard
4 × 100 m medley relay	Brazil; Davi dos Santos; Stefany Costa; Renata Branchi; Arthur Werner; Ana Julia Aguiar; Davi Vallim; Joice Otero; Kaua Santos	Argentina; Ciro Conrad; Catalina dos Santos; Guadalupe Angiolini; Cecilia Dieleke; Joaquín Giovacchini; Laila Chain; Luis Fontana; Matías Chaillou; Agostina Hein	Colombia; María Agudelo; Mariana Cabezas; Juan Bañol; Hugo Alonso; Nicolás Kokidko; Matías Ramírez; Carolina Rojas; Sophia Richard

=== Taekwondo ===
Event	Gold	Silver	Bronze
Boys' 48 kg	Nicolas Borges; Brazil	Pedro Orbea; Ecuador	Bautista Liendro; Argentina
Boys' 48 kg	Nicolas Borges; Brazil	Pedro Orbea; Ecuador	Jefferson Cueva; Peru
Boys' 55 kg	Daniel Torres; Colombia	Gabriel da Silva; Brazil	Leonel Imboden; Argentina
Boys' 55 kg	Daniel Torres; Colombia	Gabriel da Silva; Brazil	Klaython Fiallos; Ecuador
Boys' 63 kg	Gabriel Fonseca; Brazil	Juan Soto; Venezuela	Andrés Lasso; Panama
Boys' 63 kg	Gabriel Fonseca; Brazil	Juan Soto; Venezuela	Pedro Fuenzalida; Chile
Boys' 73 kg	Jhonny Mejía; Ecuador	Vicente Tapia; Chile	Marcos Larivey; Argentina
Boys' 73 kg	Jhonny Mejía; Ecuador	Vicente Tapia; Chile	Mateo Moscoso; Peru
Boys' +73 kg	Juan Ramos; Chile	Mateo Gaona; Argentina	Saúl de Gracia; Panama
Boys' +73 kg	Juan Ramos; Chile	Mateo Gaona; Argentina	Allan Machado; Brazil
Girls' 44 kg	Poliana de Souza; Brazil	Natalia Pérez; Panama	Betania Medina; Paraguay
Girls' 44 kg	Poliana de Souza; Brazil	Natalia Pérez; Panama	Belinda Mancilla; Bolivia
Girls' 49 kg	Danna Ramírez; Colombia	Dalia Seminario; Peru	Alisa Astapenka; Chile
Girls' 49 kg	Danna Ramírez; Colombia	Dalia Seminario; Peru	Trinidad Brigetti; Argentina
Girls' 55 kg	Giovanna Lopes; Brazil	María Torres; Ecuador	Mabel Mejía; Colombia
Girls' 55 kg	Giovanna Lopes; Brazil	María Torres; Ecuador	Zoe Capolongo; Argentina
Girls' 63 kg	Melissa González; Argentina	María Gomez; Colombia	Amira Grira; Panama
Girls' 63 kg	Melissa González; Argentina	María Gomez; Colombia	Alicia da Silva; Brazil
Girls' +63 kg	Mayte Caicedo; Ecuador	Stephani Valente; Brazil	Kiara Paz; Colombia
Girls' +63 kg	Mayte Caicedo; Ecuador	Stephani Valente; Brazil	Camila Martínez; Argentina
Boys' poomsae	Marcelo Rodríguez; Peru	Iker Yangari; Ecuador	Ygor Monção; Brazil
Boys' poomsae	Marcelo Rodríguez; Peru	Iker Yangari; Ecuador	Kelvin Cusi; Bolivia
Girls' poomsae	Nancy Haidar; Venezuela	Ana Gonçalves; Brazil	Martina Barroso; Argentina
Girls' poomsae	Nancy Haidar; Venezuela	Ana Gonçalves; Brazil	Raquel Gil; Peru
Mixed pair recognized poomsae	Peru; Raquel Gil; Marcelo Rodríguez	Brazil; Ana Gonçalves; Ygor Monção	Ecuador; Camila Manzano; Iker Yangari
Mixed pair recognized poomsae	Peru; Raquel Gil; Marcelo Rodríguez	Brazil; Ana Gonçalves; Ygor Monção	Chile; Karim Muza; Cristóbal Romo

=== Table tennis ===
Event	Gold	Silver	Bronze
Boys' singles	Sebastián Bedoya; Colombia	Keiji Takeda; Peru	Davi Fujii; Brazil
Boys' singles	Sebastián Bedoya; Colombia	Keiji Takeda; Peru	Juan González; Ecuador
Girls' singles	Dakota Ferrer; Venezuela	Lana Ozeki; Brazil	Isabel Amorim; Brazil
Girls' singles	Dakota Ferrer; Venezuela	Lana Ozeki; Brazil	Ana Gómez; Colombia
Mixed team	Colombia; Sebastián Bedoya; Rafael Quintero; Ana Gómez; Mariana Rodríguez	Peru; Samuel Duffoo; Keiji Takeda; Natzumi Aquije; Luciana Granados	Argentina; Agustín Asmu; Franco Varela; Alexia Salusso; Luciana Frías
Mixed team	Colombia; Sebastián Bedoya; Rafael Quintero; Ana Gómez; Mariana Rodríguez	Peru; Samuel Duffoo; Keiji Takeda; Natzumi Aquije; Luciana Granados	Brazil; Davi Fujii; Hamilton Yamane; Isabel Amorim; Lana Ozeki

=== Tennis ===
Event	Gold	Silver	Bronze
Boys' singles	Dante Pagani; Argentina	Benjamín Chelia; Argentina	Nicolás Baena; Peru
Girls' singles	Sol Larraya; Argentina	Camila Rodero; Chile	Yleymi Muelle; Peru
Boys' doubles	Brazil; Pedro Chabalgoity; Leonardo Storck	Peru; Nicolás Baena; Alessandro Rubini	Paraguay; Álvaro Frutos; Cayo Narváez
Girls' doubles	Argentina; Sol Larraya; Sofía Meabe	Chile; Isidora Lisboa; Camila Rodero	Peru; Leticia Bazán; Yleymi Muelle
Mixed doubles	Brazil; Eduarda Carbone; Leonardo Storck	Uruguay; Sofía Barbosa; Felipe Vazquez	Paraguay; Catalina Delmas; Álvaro Frutos

=== Triathlon ===
Event	Gold	Silver	Bronze
Boys' individual	Raimundo San Martín; Chile	Alejandro Juanuk; Brazil	Eduardo Staniaski; Brazil
Girls' individual	Manuela Ortega; Ecuador	Catalina Moreno; Colombia	María Peralta; Venezuela
Mixed relay	Chile; Julieta Waltemath; Enrique Pau; Pascalle Ahumada; Raimundo San Martín	Brazil; Luisa Ribas; Alejandro Juanuk; Ana Siqueira; Eduardo Staniaski	Argentina; Federica Carletto; Agustín Wendler; Emma Scliar; Santino Calderón

=== Weightlifting ===
Event	Gold	Silver	Bronze
Boys' 65 kg	David Linares; Venezuela	Álvaro Matricardi; Argentina	Juan Ramírez; Colombia
Boys' 71 kg	Kevin Campaz; Colombia	Elvin Arroyo; Ecuador	Osneiber Pirona; Venezuela
Boys' 79 kg	Anggelio Bueno; Colombia	Abel Acosta; Venezuela	Marco King; Chile
Boys' 88 kg	Matías Moreno; Chile	Carlos Guanare; Venezuela	Isaac Gomes; Brazil
Boys' 98 kg	Luis Ortiz; Colombia	Alan Braulio; Ecuador	Ahian Talavera; Argentina
Boys' +98 kg	Nicolás Pino; Chile	Alex Morel; Paraguay	Facundo Asuaga; Uruguay
Girls' 53 kg	Arianye Echandia; Venezuela	Luz Solís; Colombia	Sophia de Carvalho; Brazil
Girls' 58 kg	Elizabeth Cuen; Venezuela	Marely Lara; Ecuador	Laura Rivas; Colombia
Girls' 63 kg	Emily Antunes; Brazil	Ainara Gutiérrez; Venezuela	Xiomara Zapata; Colombia
Girls' 69 kg	Franlys Gutiérrez; Venezuela	Beyonce Bolaños; Ecuador	Stefany Higuita; Colombia
Girls' 77 kg	Esmeralda Herrera; Venezuela	Abril Gamarra; Peru	Jimena Mosquera; Colombia
Girls' +77 kg	Lidysmar Aparicio; Venezuela	Thiara Castro; Ecuador	Giulliana Navarro; Chile

=== Wrestling ===
Event	Gold	Silver	Bronze
Boys' Greco-Roman 48 kg	Ronald Morales; Ecuador	Jules Casalino; Peru	Samuel Acosta; Venezuela
Boys' Greco-Roman 55 kg	Haniel Rodríguez; Venezuela	Manuel García; Ecuador	Samuel Spinaci; Argentina
Boys' Greco-Roman 65 kg	Lavozier Wadik; Brazil	Fabián Cordova; Venezuela	Gerald Flores; Panama
Boys' Greco-Roman 65 kg	Lavozier Wadik; Brazil	Fabián Cordova; Venezuela	Víctor Rojas; Peru
Boys' Greco-Roman 80 kg	Lhyam Gracia; Ecuador	Laureano Verón; Argentina	Ángel Lagos; Chile
Boys' freestyle 45 kg	Daniel Tovar; Venezuela	Fernando Jimeno; Peru	Cristhian Cevallos; Ecuador
Boys' freestyle 51 kg	Francesko Canayo; Peru	César Arteaga; Ecuador	Eydan Lezcano; Panama
Boys' freestyle 60 kg	Wilfredo Rodríguez; Venezuela	Oziel Herreras; Peru	Juan Sevilla; Colombia
Boys' freestyle 60 kg	Wilfredo Rodríguez; Venezuela	Oziel Herreras; Peru	Santiago Chrisjohn; Argentina
Boys' freestyle 71 kg	Benjamín Casas; Argentina	Stheven Padrón; Venezuela	Cherian Nieva; Colombia
Boys' freestyle 71 kg	Benjamín Casas; Argentina	Stheven Padrón; Venezuela	Valentino Godoy; Chile
Boys' freestyle 92 kg	Allan de Sousa; Brazil	Álvaro Villa; Peru	Damián Pavone; Venezuela
Girls' freestyle 43 kg	Valery Rubio; Colombia	Shirley Meza; Ecuador	Laura Vieira; Brazil
Girls' freestyle 49 kg	Asia Sánchez; Venezuela	Alejandra Salinas; Chile	Xiomara Meza; Ecuador
Girls' freestyle 49 kg	Asia Sánchez; Venezuela	Alejandra Salinas; Chile	Luanny Barbosa; Brazil
Girls' freestyle 57 kg	Alejandra Serrano; Colombia	Mia Arrocha; Panama	Laynne Ferreira; Brazil
Girls' freestyle 65 kg	Yumaira Rusell; Panama	Allison Ojeda; Ecuador	Adriana Figuera; Venezuela
Girls' freestyle 65 kg	Yumaira Rusell; Panama	Allison Ojeda; Ecuador	Maria Luciano; Brazil
Girls' freestyle 73 kg	Aisha Williams; Panama	Perla Peña; Venezuela	Geovanna Sevillano; Ecuador
