= World Judo Cadets Championships =

Judo competition

- Current event or competition: 2026 World Judo Cadets Championships

Competition details
- Discipline: Judo
- Type: Annual
- Organiser: International Judo Federation (IJF)

History
- First edition: Budapest 2009
- Editions: 11
- Most recent: Guayaquil 2026
- Next edition: Chișinău 2027

The World Judo Cadets Championships are the highest level of international judo competition for juniors, 18 years of age or less. The championships are held every year by the International Judo Federation, and qualified judoka compete in their respective categories as representatives of their countries. The last edition of the championships took place in Guayaquil, Ecuador in 2026.

== Competitions ==
Edition	Year	Dates	City and host country	Venue	# Countries	# Athletes	Ref.
1	2009	6–9 August	Budapest, Hungary				
2	2011	11–14 August	Kyiv, Ukraine	Sports Palace	58	610	
3	2013	8–11 August	Miami, United States	Trump National Doral	94	603	
4	2015	5–8 August	Sarajevo, Bosnia and Herzegovina	Zetra Olympic Hall	59	481	
5	2017	9–13 August	Santiago, Chile	Estadio Nacional Julio Martínez Prádanos	64	428	
6	2019	25–29 September	Almaty, Kazakhstan	Baluan Sholak Sports Palace	61	460	
7	2022	24–28 August	Sarajevo, Bosnia and Herzegovina	Arena Hotel Hills	60	483	
8	2023	23–27 August	Zagreb, Croatia	Arena Zagreb	64	576	
9	2024	28 Aug–1 Sep	Lima, Peru	Villa Deportiva Nacional	48	403	
10	2025	27–31 August	Sofia, Bulgaria	Asics Arena	71	551	
11	2026	20–23 August	Guayaquil, Ecuador	Arena Fedeguayas VPP	59	457	
12	2027	19–22 August	Chișinău, Moldova				

== Team competitions ==
Men's team
Year	Gold	Silver	Bronze		Ref.
2015	Japan	Russia	Uzbekistan	Georgia	

Women's team
Year	Gold	Silver	Bronze		Ref.
2015	Japan	Croatia	France	Russia	

Mixed team
Year	Gold	Silver	Bronze		Ref.
2017	Russia	Brazil	Japan	Georgia	
2019	Japan	Azerbaijan	Turkey	Russia	
2022	France	Azerbaijan	Turkey	Uzbekistan	
2023	France	Azerbaijan	Turkey	Japan	
2024	Japan	France	Brazil	Mongolia	
2025	Japan	Uzbekistan	Poland	IJF	
2026	Kazakhstan	Brazil	Uzbekistan	Mongolia	
