= Japan men's national gymnastics team =

Gymnastics team representing Japan

Japan Men's National Gymnastics Team
- Continental union: Asian Gymnastics Union
- National federation: Japan Gymnastics Association

Olympic Games
- Appearances: 20
- Medals: Gold: 1960, 1964, 1968, 1972, 1976, 2004, 2016, 2024; Silver: 1956, 2008, 2012, 2020; Bronze: 1984, 1988, 1992

World Championships
- Appearances: 30
- Medals: Gold: 1962, 1966, 1970, 1974, 1978, 2015, 2023, 2026; Silver: 1954, 1958, 1979, 1981, 1995, 2007, 2010, 2011, 2014, 2022; Bronze: 1983, 2003, 2006, 2018, 2019

Asian Games
- Appearances: 14
- Medals: Gold: 2014; Silver: 1974, 1978, 1982, 1990, 2006, 2010, 2018, 2022, 2026; Bronze: 1986, 1994, 1998, 2002

Asian Championships
- Appearances: 10
- Medals: Gold: 2008, 2015, 2023, 2025; Silver: 2003, 2006, 2012, 2019, 2022, 2026; Bronze: 1996, 2017

Summer Universiade
- Appearances: 27
- Medals: Gold: 1963, 1965, 1967, 1970, 1995, 1999, 2005, 2007, 2009, 2011, 2015, 2017, 2019; Silver: 1973, 1977, 1979, 1985, 1991, 1997, 2001, 2021; Bronze: 1987, 2003, 2013

Junior World Championships
- Appearances: 3
- Medals: Gold: 2019, 2023; Silver: 2025

The Japan men's national artistic gymnastics team is a sport group governed by Japan Gymnastics Association and represents Japan in international gymnastics competitions and multi-sports events. Followed the establishment of All Japan Gymnastics Federation in 1930, the team first appeared at the 1932 Summer Olympics and gradually became the major force till this day. For nearly two decades, from 1960 to 1978, Japanese men was dominant and won every gold medal at the Olympics and World Championships.

== History ==
=== 1930-1958: Establishment to first medals ===
The Japanese first appeared internationally at the 1932 Summer Olympics, following the establishment of All Japan Gymnastics Federation on April 13, 1930, and finished 5th. They returned 4 years later in Berlin, Germany and got 9th place. As the result of the World War II, Germany, Japan and Bulgaria, under Allied military occupations, were not allowed to send athletes to London.

The breakthrough came in 1952 when Japanese gymnasts achieved 4 medals at the 1952 Summer Olympics in Helsinki. Tadao Uesako brought home a silver in floor and a bronze in vault. Another two vault medalists were Masao Takemoto and Takashi Ono, winning silver and bronze respectively. The team made its debut at the World Artistic Gymnastics Championships in 1954 and immediately achieved success, winning silver in Group All-around, their first world-level medal in the discipline. Takemoto became the champion in Floor, also the country first gold medal, and bronze in Parallel Bars.

Japan's performances in men's gymnastics improved incredibly at the 1956 Olympics, with 11 medals in total. While securing their position as 2nd best team in the world, winning silver in Group All-around, they also achieved first Olympic gold medal, with Takashi Ono being the champion in Horizontal Bar. Ono was also tied with Viktor Chukarin as the most decorated male gymnasts at the Games, winning silvers in All-around and Pommel Horse, and a bronze in Parallel Bars. Other successful Japanese gymnasts in individual disciplines were Masao Takemoto, winning 3 bronzes, Masumi Kubota, a silver in Parallel Bars and a bronze in Rings, and Nobuyuki Aihara, a bronze in Floor.

Ono and Takemoto led team Japan to defend their second place at the 1958 World Championships, with each of them winning 5 and 4 individual medals respectively. Takemoto successfully achieved another gold in Floor, and added a Vault silver and Horizontal Bar bronze to his collection. Ono received 3 silvers in All-around, Floor, Parallel Bars and a bronze in Vault. Another individual medal was a silver in Rings achieved by Nobuyuki Aihara.

=== 1960-1978: World Superpower ===
For nearly 30 years, Japan dominated men's gymnastics, winning every team competition from 1960 Summer Olympics to 1978 World Championships. During this golden age, many gymnasts rose to prominent and achieved overwhelming success. Despite the World Championships only be held every four year, multiple legends appeared and became some of the most decorated gymnasts in the history. Notable names could be mentioned are Sawao Kato, who's holding the record of most Olympics gold medals, Akinori Nakayama, most Olympic and World victories until being surpassed by Kohei Uchimura in 2016, Eizo Kenmotsu, 24 medals including 10 gold, Mitsuo Tsukahara, 15 medals with 9 gold, Yukio Endo, 8 victories and 17 times being on the podium, Takashi Ono, whose glory continued until 1964 Summer Olympics, Shigeru Kasamatsu, Haruhiro Yamashita, Shuji Tsurumi, Nobuyuki Aihara, Takashi Mitsukuri,...

- 1960 Summer Olympics

Japan defeated the USSR in Team All-around for the first time, ending a decade of Soviet domination in the discipline. Takashi Ono brought home two more gold medals in Vault and horizontal bar, as well as an all around silver, and two bronzes in rings and parallel bars, respectively. Nobuyuki Aihara also won the floor, and other 2 medals were achieved by Masao Takemoto, with a silver in horizontal bar, and Shuji Tsurumi, the pommel horse bronze medalist. In total, Japanese team won 9 medals, 2 less than 4 years ago, but 3 more gold, jumping to second place with only 2 behind the USSR.

Gymnasts	Team	AA	Floor (gymnastics)	Pommel horse	Rings (gymnastics)	Vault (gymnastics)	Parallel bars	Horizontal bar
Takashi Ono	1st place, gold medalist(s)	2nd place, silver medalist(s)	4	6	3rd place, bronze medalist(s)	1st place, gold medalist(s)	3rd place, bronze medalist(s)	1st place, gold medalist(s)
Nobuyuki Aihara	1st place, gold medalist(s)	7	1st place, gold medalist(s)	26	5	9	4	13
Masao Takemoto	1st place, gold medalist(s)	5	14	26	8	7	6	2nd place, silver medalist(s)
Shuji Tsurumi	1st place, gold medalist(s)	4	13	3rd place, bronze medalist(s)	9	6	8	8
Yukio Endo	1st place, gold medalist(s)	5	10	10	12	5	7	4
Takashi Mitsukuri	1st place, gold medalist(s)	9	4	4	12	8	19	9

- 1962 World Championships

At the World Championships 2 years later in Prague, Japan surpassed the USSR, climbing to the first on men's medal table. They continued the victory in team, while also being successful in individual events, winning another 3 gold, 4 silver and 3 bronze. Yukio Endo was the biggest star by reaching the podium in every category except for pommel horse. He shared the victory in floor with the reigning Olympic Champion and compatriot Nobuyuki Aihara, getting silvers in individual all-around, rings and horizontal bar, bronzes in vault and parallel bars. Takashi Ono adding another gold in horizontal bar to his collection. Another 2 medal of the Japanese team were a silver from the later Olympic and world vault champion, Haruhiro Yamashita and a bronze in pommel horse by Takashi Mitsukuri.

Gymnasts	Team	AA	Floor (gymnastics)	Pommel horse	Rings (gymnastics)	Vault (gymnastics)	Parallel bars	Horizontal bar
Yukio Endo	1st place, gold medalist(s)	2nd place, silver medalist(s)	1st place, gold medalist(s)		2nd place, silver medalist(s)	3rd place, bronze medalist(s)	3rd place, bronze medalist(s)	2nd place, silver medalist(s)
Takashi Ono	1st place, gold medalist(s)	4	5			5	5	1st place, gold medalist(s)
Nobuyuki Aihara	1st place, gold medalist(s)	12	1st place, gold medalist(s)		4			
Haruhiro Yamashita	1st place, gold medalist(s)	7	4			2nd place, silver medalist(s)	4	
Takashi Mitsukuri	1st place, gold medalist(s)	6		3rd place, bronze medalist(s)				4
Shuji Tsurumi	1st place, gold medalist(s)	9						

- 1964 Summer Olympics

When Japan hosted their first Olympics in 1964, their male gymnasts won big at home. The Japanese men achieved the total of 5 gold medals, more than the whole Soviet team, male and female, combined. The defending Olympic and world champion successfully secured the top position in team, with the exact score different like 4 years ago, 2.500. Yukio Endo won the first gold medal in all-around for Japan, while his compatriot Shuji Tsurumi got the silver. The two men also achieved 2 other medals each, with Endo winning gold parallel bars and silver in floor, and Tsurumi getting 2 silvers in parallel bars & pommel horse. in vault, the defending world runner-up Haruhiro Yamashita became the Olympic champion, and Takuji Hayata bought Japan the first victory in rings.

Gymnasts	Team	AA	Floor (gymnastics)	Pommel horse	Rings (gymnastics)	Vault (gymnastics)	Parallel bars	Horizontal bar
Yukio Endo	1st place, gold medalist(s)	1st place, gold medalist(s)	2nd place, silver medalist(s)	17	6	6	1st place, gold medalist(s)	5
Haruhiro Yamashita	1st place, gold medalist(s)	6	7	4	21	1st place, gold medalist(s)	7	7
Takuji Hayata	1st place, gold medalist(s)	8	7	7	1st place, gold medalist(s)	16	10	12
Shuji Tsurumi	1st place, gold medalist(s)	2nd place, silver medalist(s)	9	2nd place, silver medalist(s)	5	4	2nd place, silver medalist(s)	21
Takashi Ono	1st place, gold medalist(s)	11	14	7	9	14	25	6
Takashi Mitsukuri	1st place, gold medalist(s)	9	5	6	14	24	13	11

- 1966 World Championships

Japan showed their domination rival at the 1966 World Championships by winning 13 medals, including 4 golds, 5 silvers and 4 bronzes. Akinori Nakayama was the biggest star with 3 championship titles in team, floor, parallel bars, as well as a silver in rings and 2 bronzes in all-around and vault. In total, he won the same number of medals as the Soviet men, also the number of gold medals. The defending Olympic champion in vault, Haruhiro Yamashita successfully became the world champion in the same apparatus. All other 4 Japanese gymnasts were also on the podium in individual events. Yukio Endo won 2 silvers in floor and horizontal bar. Takeshi Kato got a silver in vault and a bronze in pommel horse. Takashi Mitsukuri helped Japan achieve the podium sweep in horizontal bar. Shuji Tsurumi, the all-around runner-up, also qualified for all 6 apparatus finals. However, an injury happened in rings performance caused him to withdraw from the competition.

Gymnasts	Team	AA	Floor (gymnastics)	Pommel horse	Rings (gymnastics)	Vault (gymnastics)	Parallel bars	Horizontal bar
Akinori Nakayama	1st place, gold medalist(s)	3rd place, bronze medalist(s)	1st place, gold medalist(s)		2nd place, silver medalist(s)	3rd place, bronze medalist(s)		1st place, gold medalist(s)
Haruhiro Yamashita	1st place, gold medalist(s)	10				1st place, gold medalist(s)		
Yukio Endo	1st place, gold medalist(s)	7	2nd place, silver medalist(s)			4		2nd place, silver medalist(s)
Takeshi Katō	1st place, gold medalist(s)	6	4	3rd place, bronze medalist(s)	4	2nd place, silver medalist(s)		
Shuji Tsurumi	1st place, gold medalist(s)	2nd place, silver medalist(s)	6	5	6	6	6	6
Takashi Mitsukuri	1st place, gold medalist(s)	8						3rd place, bronze medalist(s)

- 1968 Summer Olympics

Gymnasts	Team	AA	Floor (gymnastics)	Pommel horse	Rings (gymnastics)	Vault (gymnastics)	Parallel bars	Horizontal bar
Akinori Nakayama	1st place, gold medalist(s)	3rd place, bronze medalist(s)	2nd place, silver medalist(s)	12	1st place, gold medalist(s)	5	1st place, gold medalist(s)	1st place, gold medalist(s)
Sawao Kato	1st place, gold medalist(s)	1st place, gold medalist(s)	1st place, gold medalist(s)	8	3rd place, bronze medalist(s)	7	7	7
Yukio Endo	1st place, gold medalist(s)	8	11	26	8	2nd place, silver medalist(s)	9	6
Takeshi Katō	1st place, gold medalist(s)	5	3rd place, bronze medalist(s)	20	5	4	4	11
Eizo Kenmotsu	1st place, gold medalist(s)	4	6	5	7	6	5	3rd place, bronze medalist(s)
Mitsuo Tsukahara	1st place, gold medalist(s)	18	4	53	4	27	74	11

- 1970 World Championships

Gymnasts	Team	AA	Floor (gymnastics)	Pommel horse	Rings (gymnastics)	Vault (gymnastics)	Parallel bars	Horizontal bar
Akinori Nakayama	1st place, gold medalist(s)	3rd place, bronze medalist(s)	1st place, gold medalist(s)		1st place, gold medalist(s)	6	1st place, gold medalist(s)	2nd place, silver medalist(s)
Eizo Kenmotsu	1st place, gold medalist(s)	1st place, gold medalist(s)	2nd place, silver medalist(s)	2nd place, silver medalist(s)	4	5	2nd place, silver medalist(s)	1st place, gold medalist(s)
Mitsuo Tsukahara	1st place, gold medalist(s)	2nd place, silver medalist(s)	5		2nd place, silver medalist(s)	1st place, gold medalist(s)		
Takeshi Katō	1st place, gold medalist(s)	8	3rd place, bronze medalist(s)			3rd place, bronze medalist(s)	4	
Takuji Hayata	1st place, gold medalist(s)	7			4			3rd place, bronze medalist(s)
Fumio Honma	1st place, gold medalist(s)	6				4		6

- 1972 Summer Olympics

Gymnasts	Team	AA	Floor (gymnastics)	Pommel horse	Rings (gymnastics)	Vault (gymnastics)	Parallel bars	Horizontal bar
Sawao Kato	1st place, gold medalist(s)	1st place, gold medalist(s)	6	2nd place, silver medalist(s)	4	4	1st place, gold medalist(s)	2nd place, silver medalist(s)
Akinori Nakayama	1st place, gold medalist(s)	3rd place, bronze medalist(s)	2nd place, silver medalist(s)	7	1st place, gold medalist(s)	12	5	5
Mitsuo Tsukahara	1st place, gold medalist(s)	8	8	34	3rd place, bronze medalist(s)	71	11	1st place, gold medalist(s)
Eizo Kenmotsu	1st place, gold medalist(s)	2nd place, silver medalist(s)	4	3rd place, bronze medalist(s)	5	4	3rd place, bronze medalist(s)	4
Shigeru Kasamatsu	1st place, gold medalist(s)	5	3rd place, bronze medalist(s)	4	12	7	2nd place, silver medalist(s)	3rd place, bronze medalist(s)
Teruichi Okamura	1st place, gold medalist(s)	11	12	29	9	54	14	10

- 1974 World Championships

Gymnasts	Team	AA	Floor (gymnastics)	Pommel horse	Rings (gymnastics)	Vault (gymnastics)	Parallel bars	Horizontal bar
Shigeru Kasamatsu	1st place, gold medalist(s)	1st place, gold medalist(s)	1st place, gold medalist(s)	4		1st place, gold medalist(s)		
Eizo Kenmotsu	1st place, gold medalist(s)	3rd place, bronze medalist(s)		3rd place, bronze medalist(s)		5	1st place, gold medalist(s)	3rd place, bronze medalist(s)
Hiroshi Kajiyama	1st place, gold medalist(s)	4	2nd place, silver medalist(s)			3rd place, bronze medalist(s)	4	
Mitsuo Tsukahara	1st place, gold medalist(s)	5			4			6
Fumio Honma	1st place, gold medalist(s)	12						
Sawao Kato	1st place, gold medalist(s)							

- 1976 Summer Olympics

Gymnasts	Team	AA	Floor (gymnastics)	Pommel horse	Rings (gymnastics)	Vault (gymnastics)	Parallel bars	Horizontal bar
Mitsuo Tsukahara	1st place, gold medalist(s)	3rd place, bronze medalist(s)	8	8	9	2nd place, silver medalist(s)	3rd place, bronze medalist(s)	1st place, gold medalist(s)
Sawao Kato	1st place, gold medalist(s)	2nd place, silver medalist(s)	5	5	6	7	1st place, gold medalist(s)	8
Eizo Kenmotsu	1st place, gold medalist(s)	L	6	2nd place, silver medalist(s)	5	15	17	2nd place, silver medalist(s)
Hiroshi Kajiyama	1st place, gold medalist(s)	5	12	7	12	3rd place, bronze medalist(s)	L	10
Shun Fujimoto	1st place, gold medalist(s)	INJ	14	29	15	INJ	INJ	INJ
Hisato Igarashi	1st place, gold medalist(s)	L	29	11	29	19	10	7

- 1978 World Championships

Gymnasts	Team	AA	Floor (gymnastics)	Pommel horse	Rings (gymnastics)	Vault (gymnastics)	Parallel bars	Horizontal bar
Shigeru Kasamatsu	1st place, gold medalist(s)	7	2nd place, silver medalist(s)	8	4			1st place, gold medalist(s)
Eizo Kenmotsu	1st place, gold medalist(s)	2nd place, silver medalist(s)			6	8	1st place, gold medalist(s)	8
Junichi Shimizu	1st place, gold medalist(s)					1st place, gold medalist(s)		
Hiroshi Kajiyama	1st place, gold medalist(s)	5					2nd place, silver medalist(s)	
Mitsuo Tsukahara	1st place, gold medalist(s)							
Shinzo Shiraishi	1st place, gold medalist(s)							

=== 1979-1992: Declining Results ===
- 1979 World Championships

Gymnasts	Team	AA	Floor (gymnastics)	Pommel horse	Rings (gymnastics)	Vault (gymnastics)	Parallel bars	Horizontal bar
Koji Gushiken	2nd place, silver medalist(s)	7		3rd place, bronze medalist(s)	4		4	
Hiroshi Kajiyama	2nd place, silver medalist(s)	9					6	
Shigeru Kasamatsu	2nd place, silver medalist(s)		6	6		7		
Nobuyuki Kajitani	2nd place, silver medalist(s)							7
Eizo Kenmotsu	2nd place, silver medalist(s)							
Toshiomi Nishikii	2nd place, silver medalist(s)	15						

- 1981 World Championships

Gymnasts	Team	AA	Floor (gymnastics)	Pommel horse	Rings (gymnastics)	Vault (gymnastics)	Parallel bars	Horizontal bar
Koji Gushiken	2nd place, silver medalist(s)	3rd place, bronze medalist(s)	3rd place, bronze medalist(s)	7			1st place, gold medalist(s)	6
Nobuyuki Kajitani	2nd place, silver medalist(s)	9	7		5		3rd place, bronze medalist(s)	
Koji Sotomura	2nd place, silver medalist(s)	7						
Kyoji Yamawaki	2nd place, silver medalist(s)							
Kiyoshi Goto	2nd place, silver medalist(s)			5				4
Toshiro Kanai	2nd place, silver medalist(s)							

- 1983 World Championships

Gymnasts	Team	AA	Floor (gymnastics)	Pommel horse	Rings (gymnastics)	Vault (gymnastics)	Parallel bars	Horizontal bar
Koji Gushiken	3rd place, bronze medalist(s)	2nd place, silver medalist(s)		7	1st place, gold medalist(s)		5	
Koji Sotomura	3rd place, bronze medalist(s)	17	8		4		3rd place, bronze medalist(s)	
Nobuyuki Kajitani	3rd place, bronze medalist(s)	7						
Noritoshi Hirata	3rd place, bronze medalist(s)					8		
Shinji Morisue	3rd place, bronze medalist(s)					7		4
Mitsuaki Watanabe	3rd place, bronze medalist(s)							7

- 1984 Summer Olympics

Gymnasts	Team	AA	Floor (gymnastics)	Pommel horse	Rings (gymnastics)	Vault (gymnastics)	Parallel bars	Horizontal bar
Koji Gushiken	3rd place, bronze medalist(s)	1st place, gold medalist(s)	8	21	1st place, gold medalist(s)	2nd place, silver medalist(s)	5	3rd place, bronze medalist(s)
Shinji Morisue	3rd place, bronze medalist(s)	16Q, L	13	34	33	2nd place, silver medalist(s)	35	1st place, gold medalist(s)
Nobuyuki Kajitani	3rd place, bronze medalist(s)	8	36	6	9	16	2nd place, silver medalist(s)	37
Koji Sotomura	3rd place, bronze medalist(s)	25Q, L	3rd place, bronze medalist(s)	43	30	25	31	25
Noritoshi Hirata	3rd place, bronze medalist(s)	9	30	15	25	32	14	12
Kyoji Yamawaki	3rd place, bronze medalist(s)	29Q, L	9	65	6	16	15	45

- 1985 World Championships

Gymnasts	Team	AA	Floor (gymnastics)	Pommel horse	Rings (gymnastics)	Vault (gymnastics)	Parallel bars	Horizontal bar
Koji Gushiken	4	13		8			3rd place, bronze medalist(s)	
Koji Sotomura	4	11					8	
Hiroyuki Konishi	4	12		3rd place, bronze medalist(s)				5
Kyoji Yamawaki	4		6		3rd place, bronze medalist(s)			
Mitsuaki Watanabe	4							3rd place, bronze medalist(s)
Shigemitsu Kondo	4							

- 1987 World Championships

Gymnasts	Team	AA	Floor (gymnastics)	Pommel horse	Rings (gymnastics)	Vault (gymnastics)	Parallel bars	Horizontal bar
Koichi Mizushima	5	10	7				5	
Naoyuki Terao	5	21						
Hiroyuki Konishi	5	32						
Morimasa Honda	5							
Yukihiro Hayase	5							
Shinji Kanda	5							

- 1988 Summer Olympics

Gymnasts	Team	AA	Floor (gymnastics)	Pommel horse	Rings (gymnastics)	Vault (gymnastics)	Parallel bars	Horizontal bar
Yukio Iketani	3rd place, bronze medalist(s)	8	3rd place, bronze medalist(s)	22	21	7	29	9
Hiroyuki Konishi	3rd place, bronze medalist(s)	37	51	19	46	46	50	35
Koichi Mizushima	3rd place, bronze medalist(s)	10	19	4	21	26	18	12
Daisuke Nishikawa	3rd place, bronze medalist(s)	13	47	51	17	23	8	5
Toshiharu Sato	3rd place, bronze medalist(s)	26	30	12	21	26	18	56
Takahiro Yameda	3rd place, bronze medalist(s)	44	68	36	39	60	29	38

- 1989 World Championships

Gymnasts	Team	AA	Floor (gymnastics)	Pommel horse	Rings (gymnastics)	Vault (gymnastics)	Parallel bars	Horizontal bar
Toshiharu Sato	4	12	8		6			7
Yukio Iketani	4	4						3rd place, bronze medalist(s)
Yoshikazu Nakamura	4	18						
Daisuke Nishikawa	4							
Hiroyuki Kato	4							
Masayuki Matsunaga	4							

- 1991 World Championships

Gymnasts	Team	AA	Floor (gymnastics)	Pommel horse	Rings (gymnastics)	Vault (gymnastics)	Parallel bars	Horizontal bar
Yukio Iketani	4	13			6	6		8
Yoshiaki Hatakeda	4	10		4			6	
Daisuke Nishikawa	4	7	3rd place, bronze medalist(s)				4	
Takashi Chinen	4							
Masayuki Matsunaga	4							
Yutaka Aihara	4					3rd place, bronze medalist(s)		

- 1992 World Championships

Gymnasts	Team	AA	Floor (gymnastics)	Pommel horse	Rings (gymnastics)	Vault (gymnastics)	Parallel bars	Horizontal bar
Yutaka Aihara	—N/a	—N/a	4					
Yukio Iketani	—N/a	—N/a	9					5
Hikaru Tanaka	—N/a	—N/a		5		16		
Yoshiaki Hatakeda	—N/a	—N/a		6			6	
Daisuke Nishikawa	—N/a	—N/a						9
	—N/a	—N/a						

- 1992 Summer Olympics

Gymnasts	Team	AA	Floor (gymnastics)	Pommel horse	Rings (gymnastics)	Vault (gymnastics)	Parallel bars	Horizontal bar
Yutaka Aihara	3rd place, bronze medalist(s)	21	5	35	36	8	35	46
Takashi Chinen	3rd place, bronze medalist(s)	27	24	11	31	27	18	17
Yoshiaki Hatakeda	3rd place, bronze medalist(s)	15	36	5	76	53	13	55
Yukio Iketani	3rd place, bronze medalist(s)	23	2nd place, silver medalist(s)	12	7	23	12	67
Masayuki Matsunaga	3rd place, bronze medalist(s)	35	27	80	27	17	3rd place, bronze medalist(s)	17
Daisuke Nishikawa	3rd place, bronze medalist(s)	17	47	51	17	23	8	5

=== 1993-2002: Deeply Struggling ===
- 1993 World Championships

Gymnasts	Team	AA	Floor (gymnastics)	Pommel horse	Rings (gymnastics)	Vault (gymnastics)	Parallel bars	Horizontal bar
Hikaru Tanaka	—N/a	16	16	17	27	41	45	20
Takashi Chinen	—N/a	32	56	22	61	79	42	22
Daisuke Nishikawa	—N/a	38	10	95	34	44	16	30

- 1994 World Championships

Gymnasts	Team	AA	Floor (gymnastics)	Pommel horse	Rings (gymnastics)	Vault (gymnastics)	Parallel bars	Horizontal bar
Hikaru Tanaka	5	11						
Daisuke Nishikawa	5	45						
Masayuki Matsunaga	5							
Toshiharu Sato	5							
Takehiko Ono	5							
Yoshiaki Hatakeda	5	13						
Masayoshi Maeda	5							
Masanori Suzuki	—N/a		8			6		

- 1995 World Championships

Gymnasts	Team	AA	Floor (gymnastics)	Pommel horse	Rings (gymnastics)	Vault (gymnastics)	Parallel bars	Horizontal bar
Yoshiaki Hatakeda	2nd place, silver medalist(s)	6		2nd place, silver medalist(s)			7	2nd place, silver medalist(s)
Daisuke Nishikawa	2nd place, silver medalist(s)	14						
Hikaru Tanaka	2nd place, silver medalist(s)	13		5	7		3rd place, bronze medalist(s)	
Toshiharu Sato	2nd place, silver medalist(s)							
Masayuki Matsunaga	2nd place, silver medalist(s)							
Hiromasa Masuda	2nd place, silver medalist(s)							
Masayoshi Maeda	2nd place, silver medalist(s)							

- 1996 World Championships

Gymnasts	Team	AA	Floor (gymnastics)	Pommel horse	Rings (gymnastics)	Vault (gymnastics)	Parallel bars	Horizontal bar
Masanori Suzuki						12		

- 1996 Summer Olympics

Gymnasts	Team	AA	Floor (gymnastics)	Pommel horse	Rings (gymnastics)	Vault (gymnastics)	Parallel bars	Horizontal bar
Naoya Tsukahara	10	12	14	28	48	23	19	30
Hikaru Tanaka	10	19	40	24	58	40	17	23
Yoshiaki Hatakeda	10	15	36	5	76	53	13	55
Toshiharu Sato	10	29	54	29	59	32	38	60
Shigeru Kurihara	10	44	37	81	17	58	61	82
Takashi Uchiyama	10	54	44	83	69	90	72	69

- 1997 World Championships

Gymnasts	Team	AA	Floor (gymnastics)	Pommel horse	Rings (gymnastics)	Vault (gymnastics)	Parallel bars	Horizontal bar
Kenichi Fujita	4	35						
Yoshiaki Hatakeda	4	11						5
Takuya Kishimoto	4							
Shigeru Kurihara	4							
Naoya Tsukahara	4	3rd place, bronze medalist(s)					3rd place, bronze medalist(s)	
Yoshihiro Saito	4				8			

- 1999 World Championships

Gymnasts	Team	AA	Floor (gymnastics)	Pommel horse	Rings (gymnastics)	Vault (gymnastics)	Parallel bars	Horizontal bar
Naoya Tsukahara	4	2nd place, silver medalist(s)					2nd place, silver medalist(s)	
Yoshihiro Saito	4	15			8			4
Akihiro Kasamatsu	4	17						
Kenichi Fujita	4							
Mutsumi Harada	4							
Tatsuya Yamada	4							

- 2000 Summer Olympics

Gymnasts	Team	AA	Floor (gymnastics)	Pommel horse	Rings (gymnastics)	Vault (gymnastics)	Parallel bars	Horizontal bar
Naoya Tsukahara	4	18	42	28	11	21	54	8
Yoshihiro Saito	4	12	44	40	18	27	63	13
Kenichi Fujita	4	25	24	33	36	14	68	36
Mutsumi Harada	4	58	41	50	36		48	33
Akihiro Kasamatsu	4	66	26	23		14		28
Norimasa Iwai	4	86			7	35	23	

- 2001 World Championships
- 2002 World Championships

Gymnasts	Team	AA	Floor (gymnastics)	Pommel horse	Rings (gymnastics)	Vault (gymnastics)	Parallel bars	Horizontal bar
Takehiro Kashima	—N/a	—N/a		3rd place, bronze medalist(s)				
Hiroyuki Tomita	—N/a	—N/a		11	4			
Isao Yoneda	—N/a	—N/a						5
Naoya Tsukahara	—N/a	—N/a				13	13	
Yasuhiro Ogawa	—N/a	—N/a					10	

=== 2003-2008: Returning to Top & Olympic Gold ===
- 2003 World Championships

Gymnasts	Team	AA	Floor (gymnastics)	Pommel horse	Rings (gymnastics)	Vault (gymnastics)	Parallel bars	Horizontal bar
Naoya Tsukahara	3rd place, bronze medalist(s)	7	12	11	37		4	12
Hiroyuki Tomita	3rd place, bronze medalist(s)	3rd place, bronze medalist(s)	38	25	9		14	13
Takehiro Kashima	3rd place, bronze medalist(s)	7	50	1st place, gold medalist(s)	84		52	1st place, gold medalist(s)
Tatsuya Yamada	3rd place, bronze medalist(s)	—N/a	60	—N/a	5		—N/a	—N/a
Akihiro Kasamatsu	—N/a	—N/a	48	18	—N/a		16	25
Yushi Sato	—N/a	—N/a	—N/a	43	47		115	63

- 2004 Summer Olympics

Gymnasts	Team	AA	Floor (gymnastics)	Pommel horse	Rings (gymnastics)	Vault (gymnastics)	Parallel bars	Horizontal bar
Takehiro Kashima	1st place, gold medalist(s)	—N/a	53	3rd place, bronze medalist(s)	—N/a	13	40	6
Hisashi Mizutori	1st place, gold medalist(s)	—N/a	—N/a	35	23	26	—N/a	6
Daisuke Nakano	1st place, gold medalist(s)	—N/a	6	—N/a	65	—N/a	5	6
Hiroyuki Tomita	1st place, gold medalist(s)	6	62	8	4	—N/a	2nd place, silver medalist(s)	13
Naoya Tsukahara	1st place, gold medalist(s)	—N/a	4	12	13	—N/a	21	—N/a
Isao Yoneda	1st place, gold medalist(s)	11	7	76	27	—N/a	15	3rd place, bronze medalist(s)

- 2005 World Championships

Gymnasts	Team	AA	Floor (gymnastics)	Pommel horse	Rings (gymnastics)	Vault (gymnastics)	Parallel bars	Horizontal bar
Hiroyuki Tomita	—N/a	1st place, gold medalist(s)	7, WD	8	13		10	8
Hisashi Mizutori	—N/a	2nd place, silver medalist(s)	8	17	39		21	36
Eichi Sekiguchi	—N/a	—N/a	6	—N/a	—N/a	5	—N/a	16
Takehiro Kashima	—N/a	—N/a	—N/a	3rd place, bronze medalist(s)	—N/a	—N/a	18	—N/a
Tatsuya Yamada	—N/a	—N/a	—N/a	—N/a	4	—N/a	—N/a	—N/a

- 2006 World Championships

Gymnasts	Team	AA	Floor (gymnastics)	Pommel horse	Rings (gymnastics)	Vault (gymnastics)	Parallel bars	Horizontal bar
Hisashi Mizutori	3rd place, bronze medalist(s)	14	183	35	29		10	11
Takehito Mori	3rd place, bronze medalist(s)	—N/a	—N/a	26	—N/a		7	6
Takuya Nakase	3rd place, bronze medalist(s)	6	26	62	14		20	15
Eichi Sekiguchi	3rd place, bronze medalist(s)	—N/a	108	—N/a	64		—N/a	102
Hiroyuki Tomita	3rd place, bronze medalist(s)	2nd place, silver medalist(s)	14	7	11		2nd place, silver medalist(s)	4
Naoya Tsukahara	3rd place, bronze medalist(s)	—N/a	44	128	21	—N/a	12	—N/a

- 2007 World Championships

Gymnasts	Team	AA	Floor (gymnastics)	Pommel horse	Rings (gymnastics)	Vault (gymnastics)	Parallel bars	Horizontal bar
Hisashi Mizutori	2nd place, silver medalist(s)	3rd place, bronze medalist(s)	3rd place, bronze medalist(s)	49	41		13	3rd place, bronze medalist(s)
Hiroyuki Tomita	2nd place, silver medalist(s)	12	50	5	8		10	8
Yosuke Hoshi	2nd place, silver medalist(s)	—N/a	44	40	—N/a		7	16
Makoto Okiguchi	2nd place, silver medalist(s)	—N/a	8	79	88		—N/a	—N/a
Takuya Nakase	2nd place, silver medalist(s)	—N/a	10	—N/a	27		94	15
Shun Kuwahara	2nd place, silver medalist(s)	—N/a	—N/a	22	80	—N/a	16	8

- 2008 Summer Olympics

Gymnasts	Team	AA	Floor (gymnastics)	Pommel horse	Rings (gymnastics)	Vault (gymnastics)	Parallel bars	Horizontal bar
Kōhei Uchimura	2nd place, silver medalist(s)	2nd place, silver medalist(s)	5	42	43	—N/a	10	15
Koki Sakamoto	2nd place, silver medalist(s)	5	34	14	13	—N/a	18	33
Hiroyuki Tomita	2nd place, silver medalist(s)	4	23	5	32	—N/a	15	6
Takuya Nakase	2nd place, silver medalist(s)	—N/a	12	43	20	—N/a	16	5
Takehiro Kashima	2nd place, silver medalist(s)	—N/a	—N/a	33	—N/a	—N/a	21	17
Makoto Okiguchi	2nd place, silver medalist(s)	—N/a	19	—N/a	—N/a	—N/a	—N/a	—N/a

=== 2009-2016: Uchimura's Era ===
- 2009 World Championships

Gymnasts	Team	AA	Floor (gymnastics)	Pommel horse	Rings (gymnastics)	Vault (gymnastics)	Parallel bars	Horizontal bar
Kōhei Uchimura	—N/a	1st place, gold medalist(s)	4	13	12	—N/a	12	6
Kazuhito Tanaka	—N/a	4	100	52	24	—N/a	3rd place, bronze medalist(s)	20
Takuya Nakase	—N/a	—N/a	—N/a	—N/a	—N/a	—N/a	93	31
Eiichi Sekiguchi	—N/a	—N/a	—N/a	—N/a	—N/a	13	—N/a	—N/a
Makoto Okiguchi	—N/a	—N/a	5	—N/a	—N/a	—N/a	—N/a	—N/a
Koki Sakamoto	—N/a	—N/a	—N/a	31	—N/a	—N/a	—N/a	—N/a

- 2010 World Championships

Gymnasts	Team	AA	Floor (gymnastics)	Pommel horse	Rings (gymnastics)	Vault (gymnastics)	Parallel bars	Horizontal bar
Kōhei Uchimura	2nd place, silver medalist(s)	1st place, gold medalist(s)	2nd place, silver medalist(s)	12	8	—N/a	3rd place, bronze medalist(s)	14
Koji Yamamuro	2nd place, silver medalist(s)	30	241	91	4	9	22	15
Koji Uematsu	2nd place, silver medalist(s)	8	149	54	32	—N/a	5	8
Kazuhito Tanaka	2nd place, silver medalist(s)	—N/a	—N/a	—N/a	16	—N/a	21	26
Kenya Kobayashi	2nd place, silver medalist(s)	16	56	78	7	—N/a	19	31
Tatsuki Nakashima	2nd place, silver medalist(s)	—N/a	28	10	—N/a	—N/a	—N/a	—N/a

- 2011 World Championships

Gymnasts	Team	AA	Floor (gymnastics)	Pommel horse	Rings (gymnastics)	Vault (gymnastics)	Parallel bars	Horizontal bar
Kōhei Uchimura	2nd place, silver medalist(s)	1st place, gold medalist(s)	1st place, gold medalist(s)	5	6	—N/a	4	3rd place, bronze medalist(s)
Kazuhito Tanaka	2nd place, silver medalist(s)	—N/a	130	81	12	—N/a	8	13
Kenya Kobayashi	2nd place, silver medalist(s)	—N/a	—N/a	11	16	—N/a	43	53
Koji Yamamuro	2nd place, silver medalist(s)	3rd place, bronze medalist(s)	44	20	3rd place, bronze medalist(s)	22	92	16
Makoto Okiguchi	2nd place, silver medalist(s)	—N/a	20	27	—N/a	3rd place, bronze medalist(s)	—N/a	—N/a
Yusuke Tanaka	2nd place, silver medalist(s)	—N/a	222	—N/a	9	—N/a	11	6

- 2012 Summer Olympics

Gymnasts	Team	AA	Floor (gymnastics)	Pommel horse	Rings (gymnastics)	Vault (gymnastics)	Parallel bars	Horizontal bar
Ryohei Kato	2nd place, silver medalist(s)	—N/a	9	21	—N/a	—N/a	—N/a	—N/a
Kazuhito Tanaka	2nd place, silver medalist(s)	6	61	62	11	—N/a	4	30
Yusuke Tanaka	2nd place, silver medalist(s)	—N/a	—N/a	—N/a	17	—N/a	8	36
Kōhei Uchimura	2nd place, silver medalist(s)	1st place, gold medalist(s)	2nd place, silver medalist(s)	60	19	—N/a	5	16
Koji Yamamuro	2nd place, silver medalist(s)	18	41	15	23	17	50	32

- 2013 World Championships

Gymnasts	Team	AA	Floor (gymnastics)	Pommel horse	Rings (gymnastics)	Vault (gymnastics)	Parallel bars	Horizontal bar
Kohei Uchimura	—N/a	1st place, gold medalist(s)	3rd place, bronze medalist(s)	10	17	—N/a	1st place, gold medalist(s)	3rd place, bronze medalist(s)
Ryohei Kato	—N/a	2nd place, silver medalist(s)	15	21	22	—N/a	12	7
Kenzo Shirai	—N/a	—N/a	1st place, gold medalist(s)	—N/a	—N/a	4	—N/a	—N/a
Koji Yamamuro	—N/a	—N/a	—N/a	—N/a	7	—N/a	—N/a	27
Kohei Kameyama	—N/a	—N/a	—N/a	1st place, gold medalist(s)	—N/a	—N/a	—N/a	—N/a
Kazuhito Tanaka	—N/a	—N/a	—N/a	—N/a	—N/a	—N/a	75	—N/a

- 2014 World Championships

Gymnasts	Team	AA	Floor (gymnastics)	Pommel horse	Rings (gymnastics)	Vault (gymnastics)	Parallel bars	Horizontal bar
Kohei Kameyama	2nd place, silver medalist(s)	—N/a	—N/a	46	67	—N/a	—N/a	97
Ryohei Kato	2nd place, silver medalist(s)	7	6	71	32	—N/a	3rd place, bronze medalist(s)	31
Shogo Nonomura	2nd place, silver medalist(s)	11	23	18	26	—N/a	24	88
Kenzo Shirai	2nd place, silver medalist(s)	—N/a	2nd place, silver medalist(s)	—N/a	—N/a	4	30	—N/a
Yusuke Tanaka	2nd place, silver medalist(s)	3rd place, bronze medalist(s)	24	32	13	—N/a	5	25
Kōhei Uchimura	2nd place, silver medalist(s)	1st place, gold medalist(s)	5	12	17	—N/a	15	2nd place, silver medalist(s)
Kazuyuki Takeda	—N/a	—N/a	—N/a	—N/a	—N/a	—N/a	—N/a	—N/a

- 2015 World Championships

Gymnasts	Team	AA	Floor (gymnastics)	Pommel horse	Rings (gymnastics)	Vault (gymnastics)	Parallel bars	Horizontal bar
Naoto Hayasaka	1st place, gold medalist(s)	—N/a	164	87	—N/a	—N/a	—N/a	23
Ryohei Kato	1st place, gold medalist(s)	—N/a	—N/a	23	55	—N/a	130	10
Kazuma Kaya	1st place, gold medalist(s)	10	30	3rd place, bronze medalist(s)	75	—N/a	26	24
Kenzō Shirai	1st place, gold medalist(s)	—N/a	1st place, gold medalist(s)	—N/a	71	7	31	—N/a
Yusuke Tanaka	1st place, gold medalist(s)	12	16	106	22	—N/a	7	11
Kōhei Uchimura	1st place, gold medalist(s)	1st place, gold medalist(s)	64	9	21	—N/a	10	1st place, gold medalist(s)
Tomomasa Hasegawa	1st place, gold medalist(s)	—N/a	—N/a	—N/a	—N/a	—N/a	—N/a	—N/a

- 2016 Summer Olympics

Gymnasts	Team	AA	Floor (gymnastics)	Pommel horse	Rings (gymnastics)	Vault (gymnastics)	Parallel bars	Horizontal bar
Ryohei Kato	1st place, gold medalist(s)	11	16	18	49	—N/a	7	11
Kenzo Shirai	1st place, gold medalist(s)	—N/a	4	—N/a	—N/a	3rd place, bronze medalist(s)	—N/a	—N/a
Yusuke Tanaka	1st place, gold medalist(s)	—N/a	8	57	17	—N/a	55	24
Kohei Uchimura	1st place, gold medalist(s)	1st place, gold medalist(s)	5	14	20	—N/a	10	37
Koji Yamamuro	1st place, gold medalist(s)	—N/a	—N/a	24	21	—N/a	66	33

=== 2017-2020: Post Uchimura's Dominance ===
- 2017 World Championships

Gymnasts	Team	AA	Floor (gymnastics)	Pommel horse	Rings (gymnastics)	Vault (gymnastics)	Parallel bars	Horizontal bar
Kohei Uchimura	—N/a	—N/a	—N/a	—N/a	32	—N/a	30	—N/a
Kenzo Shirai	—N/a	3rd place, bronze medalist(s)	1st place, gold medalist(s)	39	43	1st place, gold medalist(s)	13	35
Wataru Tanigawa	—N/a	—N/a	57	—N/a	15	—N/a	11	—N/a
Kohei Kameyama	—N/a	—N/a	17	—N/a	—N/a	—N/a	—N/a	—N/a
Keisuke Asato	—N/a	—N/a	—N/a	—N/a	—N/a	6	—N/a	—N/a
Hidetaka Miyachi	—N/a	—N/a	—N/a	—N/a	—N/a	—N/a	—N/a	5

- 2018 World Championships

Gymnasts	Team	AA	Floor (gymnastics)	Pommel horse	Rings (gymnastics)	Vault (gymnastics)	Parallel bars	Horizontal bar
Kazuma Kaya	3rd place, bronze medalist(s)	6	8	41	24	—N/a	18	45
Kenzō Shirai	3rd place, bronze medalist(s)	7	2nd place, silver medalist(s)	20	39	3rd place, bronze medalist(s)	55	25
Yūsuke Tanaka	3rd place, bronze medalist(s)	—N/a	43	—N/a	—N/a	—N/a	12	10
Wataru Tanigawa	3rd place, bronze medalist(s)	—N/a	26	116	23	11	13	—N/a
Kōhei Uchimura	3rd place, bronze medalist(s)	—N/a	—N/a	21	28	—N/a	—N/a	2nd place, silver medalist(s)
Kakeru Tanigawa	3rd place, bronze medalist(s)	—N/a	—N/a	—N/a	—N/a	—N/a	—N/a	—N/a

- 2019 World Championships

Gymnasts	Team	AA	Floor (gymnastics)	Pommel horse	Rings (gymnastics)	Vault (gymnastics)	Parallel bars	Horizontal bar
Daiki Hashimoto	3rd place, bronze medalist(s)	—N/a	11	9	—N/a	—N/a	—N/a	4
Yuya Kamoto	3rd place, bronze medalist(s)	—N/a	47	—N/a	17	—N/a	12	20
Kazuma Kaya	3rd place, bronze medalist(s)	6	43	5	24	—N/a	3rd place, bronze medalist(s)	18
Kakeru Tanigawa	3rd place, bronze medalist(s)	40	151	11	50	—N/a	15	98
Wataru Tanigawa	3rd place, bronze medalist(s)	—N/a	—N/a	38	28	—N/a	50	—N/a
Shogo Nonomura	3rd place, bronze medalist(s)	—N/a	—N/a	—N/a	—N/a	—N/a	—N/a	—N/a

=== 2021- : Hashimoto & World Leading Teams ===
- 2020 Summer Olympics

Gymnasts	Team	AA	Floor (gymnastics)	Pommel horse	Rings (gymnastics)	Vault (gymnastics)	Parallel bars	Horizontal bar
Daiki Hashimoto	2nd place, silver medalist(s)	1st place, gold medalist(s)	10	8	27	—N/a	10	1st place, gold medalist(s)
Kazuma Kaya	2nd place, silver medalist(s)	9	27	3rd place, bronze medalist(s)	14	—N/a	17	17
Takeru Kitazono	2nd place, silver medalist(s)	5	11	22	44	—N/a	22	6
Wataru Tanigawa	2nd place, silver medalist(s)	13	14	25	17	—N/a	11	32
Kohei Kameyama	—N/a	—N/a	—N/a	5	—N/a	—N/a	—N/a	—N/a
Kohei Uchimura	—N/a	—N/a	—N/a	—N/a	—N/a	—N/a	—N/a	20

- 2021 World Championships

Gymnasts	Team	AA	Floor (gymnastics)	Pommel horse	Rings (gymnastics)	Vault (gymnastics)	Parallel bars	Horizontal bar
Daiki Hashimoto	—N/a	2nd place, silver medalist(s)	5, WD	4, WD	28	—N/a	4	2nd place, silver medalist(s)
Kazuma Kaya	—N/a	—N/a	6	2nd place, silver medalist(s)	15	—N/a	6	13
Kazuki Minami	—N/a	—N/a	2nd place, silver medalist(s)	—N/a	—N/a	—N/a	—N/a	—N/a
Hidenobu Yonekura	—N/a	—N/a	—N/a	—N/a	—N/a	2nd place, silver medalist(s)	—N/a	—N/a
Keisuke Asato	—N/a	—N/a	—N/a	—N/a	—N/a	16	—N/a	—N/a
Kohei Uchimura	—N/a	—N/a	—N/a	—N/a	—N/a	—N/a	—N/a	6

- 2022 World Championships

Gymnasts	Team	AA	Floor (gymnastics)	Pommel horse	Rings (gymnastics)	Vault (gymnastics)	Parallel bars	Horizontal bar
Daiki Hashimoto	2nd place, silver medalist(s)	1st place, gold medalist(s)	2nd place, silver medalist(s)	109	11	—N/a	16	2nd place, silver medalist(s)
Yuya Kamoto	2nd place, silver medalist(s)	—N/a	—N/a	—N/a	7	—N/a	6	7
Ryosuke Doi	2nd place, silver medalist(s)	—N/a	3rd place, bronze medalist(s)	7	—N/a	—N/a	—N/a	21
Wataru Tanigawa	2nd place, silver medalist(s)	3rd place, bronze medalist(s)	15	17	17	7	13	30
Kakeru Tanigawa	2nd place, silver medalist(s)	—N/a	9	10	46	—N/a	10	—N/a
Kazuma Kaya	2nd place, silver medalist(s)	—N/a	—N/a	—N/a	—N/a	—N/a	—N/a	—N/a

- 2023 World Championships

Gymnasts	Team	AA	Floor (gymnastics)	Pommel horse	Rings (gymnastics)	Vault (gymnastics)	Parallel bars	Horizontal bar
Kenta Chiba	1st place, gold medalist(s)	4	37	6	31	—N/a	10	7
Daiki Hashimoto	1st place, gold medalist(s)	1st place, gold medalist(s)	7	50	28	—N/a	13	1st place, gold medalist(s)
Kazuma Kaya	1st place, gold medalist(s)	2	26	17	10	—N/a	4	7
Kazuki Minami	1st place, gold medalist(s)	—N/a	2nd place, silver medalist(s)	—N/a	—N/a	12	—N/a	—N/a
Kaito Sugimoto	1st place, gold medalist(s)	—N/a	—N/a	46	23	—N/a	3rd place, bronze medalist(s)	17
*Teppei Miwa	1st place, gold medalist(s)	—N/a	—N/a	—N/a	—N/a	—N/a	—N/a	—N/a

== Team Competition Results ==
=== Olympic Games ===
- 1896 through 1928 — did not participate
- 1932 — 5th place
  Toshihiko Sasano, Shigeo Homma, Takashi Kondo, Yoshitaka Takeda, Fujio Kakuta
- 1936 — 9th place
  Yoshitaka Takeda, Hikoroku Arimoto, Yoshio Miyake, Hiroshi Nosaka, Kiichiro Toyama, Dokan Sone, Fujio Kakuta, Hiroshi Matsunobu
- 1948 — banned from participating
- 1952 — 5th place
  Akitomo Kaneko, Tetsumi Nabeya, Takashi Ono, Masao Takemoto, Tadao Uesako
- 1956 — silver medal
  Nobuyuki Aihara, Akira Kono, Masami Kubota, Takashi Ono, Masao Takemoto, Shinsaku Tsukawaki
- 1960 — gold medal
  Nobuyuki Aihara, Yukio Endo, Takashi Mitsukuri, Takashi Ono, Masao Takemoto, Shuji Tsurumi
- 1964 — gold medal
  Yukio Endo, Takuji Hayata, Takashi Mitsukuri, Takashi Ono, Shuji Tsurumi, Haruhiro Yamashita
- 1968 — gold medal
  Yukio Endo, Sawao Kato, Takeshi Kato, Eizo Kenmotsu, Akinori Nakayama, Mitsuo Tsukahara
- 1972 — gold medal
  Shigeru Kasamatsu, Sawao Kato, Eizo Kenmotsu, Akinori Nakayama, Teruichi Okamura, Mitsuo Tsukahara
- 1976 — gold medal
  Shun Fujimoto, Hisato Igarashi, Hiroshi Kajiyama, Sawao Kato, Eizo Kenmotsu, Mitsuo Tsukahara
- 1980 — did not participate
- 1984 — bronze medal
  Koji Gushiken, Noritoshi Hirata, Nobuyuki Kajitani, Shinji Morisue, Koji Sotomura, Kyoji Yamawaki
- 1988 — bronze medal
  Yukio Iketani, Hiroyuki Konishi, Koichi Mizushima, Daisuke Nishikawa, Toshiharu Sato, Takahiro Yameda
- 1992 — bronze medal
  Yutaka Aihara, Takashi Chinen, Yoshiaki Hatakeda, Yukio Iketani, Masayuki Matsunaga, Daisuke Nishikawa
- 1996 — 10th place
  Naoya Tsukahara, Hikaru Tanaka, Yoshiaki Hatakeda, Toshiharu Sato, Shigeru Kurihara, Takashi Uchiyama
- 2000 — 4th place
  Naoya Tsukahara, Yoshihiro Saito, Kenichi Fujita, Mutsumi Harada, Akihiro Kasamatsu, Norimasa Iwai
- 2004 — gold medal
  Takehiro Kashima, Hisashi Mizutori, Daisuke Nakano, Hiroyuki Tomita, Naoya Tsukahara, Isao Yoneda
- 2008 — silver medal
  Hiroyuki Tomita, Takehiro Kashima, Koki Sakamoto, Makoto Okiguchi, Kohei Uchimura, Takuya Nakase
- 2012 — silver medal
  Ryohei Kato, Kazuhito Tanaka, Yusuke Tanaka, Kohei Uchimura, Koji Yamamuro
- 2016 — gold medal
  Ryohei Kato, Kenzo Shirai, Yusuke Tanaka, Kohei Uchimura, Koji Yamamuro
- 2020 — silver medal
  Daiki Hashimoto, Kazuma Kaya, Takeru Kitazono, Wataru Tanigawa
- 2024 — gold medal
  Daiki Hashimoto, Kazuma Kaya, Shinnosuke Oka, Takaaki Sugino, Wataru Tanigawa

=== World Championships ===
- 1954 — silver medal
  Akitomo Kaneko, Akira Kono, Masami Kubota, Tetsumi Nabeya, Takashi Ono, Yoshiyuki Oshima, Masao Takemoto
- 1958 — silver medal
  Nobuyuki Aihara, Akira Kono, Takashi Ono, Masao Takemoto, Katsumi Terai, Shinsaku Tsukawaki
- 1962 — gold medal
  Nobuyuki Aihara, Yukio Endo, Takashi Mitsukuri, Takashi Ono, Shuji Tsurumi, Haruhiro Yamashita
- 1966 — gold medal
  Shuji Tsurumi, Akinori Nakayama, Takeshi Katō, Yukio Endo, Takashi Mitsukuri, Haruhiro Matsuda
- 1970 — gold medal
  Eizo Kenmotsu, Mitsuo Tsukahara, Akinori Nakayama, Fumio Honma, Takuji Hayata, Takeshi Katō
- 1974 — gold medal
  Shigeru Kasamatsu, Eizo Kenmotsu, Mitsuo Tsukahara, Hiroshi Kajiyama, Fumio Honma, Sawao Kato
- 1978 — gold medal
  Hiroshi Kajiyama, Shigeru Kasamatsu, Eizo Kenmotsu, Junichi Shimizu, Shinzo Shiraishi, Mitsuo Tsukahara
- 1979 — silver medal
  Hiroshi Kajiyama, Shigeru Kasamatsu, Nobuyuki Kajitani, Toshiomi Nishikii, Koji Gushiken, Eizo Kenmotsu
- 1981 — silver medal
  Nobuyuki Kajitani, Koji Gushiken, Koji Sotomura, Kiyoshi Goto, Kyoji Yamawaki, Toshiro Kanai
- 1983 — bronze medal
  Koji Gushiken, Koji Sotomura, Nobuyuki Kajitani, Mitsuaki Watanabe, Noritoshi Hirata, Shinji Morisue
- 1985 — 4th place
  Koji Gushiken, Koji Sotomura, Hiroyuki Konishi, Kyoji Yamawaki, Mitsuaki Watanabe, Shigemitsu Kondo
- 1987 — 5th place
  Koichi Mizushima, Naoyuki Terao, Hiroyuki Konishi, Morimasa Honda, Yukihiro Hayase, Shinji Kanda
- 1989 — 4th place
  Toshiharu Sato, Yukio Iketani, Yoshikazu Nakamura, Daisuke Nishikawa, Hiroyuki Kato, Masayuki Matsunaga
- 1991 — 4th place
  Yukio Iketani, Yoshiaki Hatakeda, Daisuke Nishikawa, Takashi Chinen, Masayuki Matsunaga, Yutaka Aihara
- 1994 — 5th place
  Hikaru Tanaka, Daisuke Nishikawa, Masayuki Matsunaga, Toshiharu Sato, Takehiko Ono, Yoshiaki Hatakeda, Masayoshi Maeda
- 1995 — silver medal
  Yoshiaki Hatakeda, Daisuke Nishikawa, Hikaru Tanaka, Toshiharu Sato, Masayuki Matsunaga, Hiromasa Masuda, Masayoshi Maeda
- 1997 — 4th place
  Kenichi Fujita, Yoshiaki Hatakeda, Takuya Kishimoto, Shigeru Kurihara, Naoya Tsukahara, Yoshihiro Saito
- 1999 — 4th place
  Naoya Tsukahara, Yoshihiro Saito, Akihiro Kasamatsu, Kenichi Fujita, Mutsumi Harada, Tatsuya Yamada
- 2001 — did not participate
- 2003 — bronze medal
  Takehiro Kashima, Hiroyuki Tomita, Naoya Tsukahara, Tatsuya Yamada
- 2006 — bronze medal
  Hisashi Mizutori, Takehito Mori, Takuya Nakase, Eichi Sekiguchi, Hiroyuki Tomita, Naoya Tsukahara
- 2007 — silver medal
  Hisashi Mizutori, Hiroyuki Tomita, Yosuke Hoshi, Makoto Okiguchi, Takuya Nakase, Shun Kuwahara
- 2010 — silver medal
  Kōhei Uchimura, Koji Yamamuro, Koji Uematsu, Kazuhito Tanaka, Kenya Kobayashi, Tatsuki Nakashima
- 2011 — silver medal
  Kōhei Uchimura, Kazuhito Tanaka, Kenya Kobayashi, Koji Yamamuro, Makoto Okiguchi, Yusuke Tanaka
- 2014 — silver medal
  Kohei Kameyama, Ryohei Kato, Shogo Nonomura, Kenzo Shirai, Yusuke Tanaka, Kōhei Uchimura, Kazuyuki Takeda*
- 2015 — gold medal
  Naoto Hayasaka, Ryohei Kato, Kazuma Kaya, Kenzō Shirai, Yusuke Tanaka, Kōhei Uchimura, Tomomasa Hasegawa*
- 2018 — bronze medal
  Kazuma Kaya, Kenzō Shirai, Yūsuke Tanaka, Wataru Tanigawa, Kōhei Uchimura, Kakeru Tanigawa*
- 2019 — bronze medal
  Daiki Hashimoto, Yuya Kamoto, Kazuma Kaya, Kakeru Tanigawa, Wataru Tanigawa, Shogo Nonomura*
- 2022 — silver medal
  Ryosuke Doi, Daiki Hashimoto, Yuya Kamoto, Kakeru Tanigawa, Wataru Tanigawa, Kazuma Kaya*
- 2023 — gold medal
  Kenta Chiba, Daiki Hashimoto, Kazuma Kaya, Kazuki Minami, Kaito Sugimoto, Teppei Miwa*
- 2026 — gold medal
  Ryosuke Doi, Daiki Hashimoto, Shohei Kawakami, Fusuke Maeda, Shinnosuke Oka, Nao Ojima

=== Asian Games ===
- 1974 — silver medal
  Kazuo Horide, Kenji Igarashi, Takeo Igarashi, Ryuji Nakayama, Hideyuki Nozawa, Hiroshi Sugawara
- 1978 — silver medal
  Nobuyuki Kajitani, Junichi Kitagawa, Toshiomi Nishikii, Teruichi Okamura, Shinzo Shiraishi, Haruyasu Taguchi
- 1982 — silver medal
  Koji Gushiken, Noritoshi Hirata, Nobuyuki Kajitani, Shinji Morisue, Taichi Okada, Koji Sotomura
- 1986 — bronze medal
  Yukihiro Hayase, Hiroyuki Konishi, Koichi Mizushima, Hiroaki Okabe, Koji Sotomura, Kyoji Yamawaki
- 1990 — silver medal
  Yutaka Aihara, Yoshiaki Hatakeda, Yukio Iketani, Masayuki Matsunaga, Daisuke Nishikawa, Toshiharu Sato
- 1994 — bronze medal
  Takashi Chinen, Yoshiaki Hatakeda, Horimasa Masuda, Masayuki Matsunaga, Daisuke Nishikawa, Toshiharu Sato, Hikaru Tanaka
- 1998 — bronze medal
  Mutsumi Harada, Akihiro Kasamatsu, Yasuhiro Ogawa, Yoshihiro Saito, Naoya Tsukahara, Isao Yoneda
- 2002 — bronze medal
  Mutsumi Harada, Takehiro Kashima, Hisashi Mizutori, Yasuhiro Ogawa, Hiroyuki Tomita, Naoya Tsukahara
- 2006 — silver medal
  Ryosuke Baba, Kenya Kobayashi, Shun Kuwahara, Hisashi Mizutori, Hiroyuki Tomita, Yuki Yoshimura
- 2010 — silver medal
  Ryosuke Baba, Ryotaka Deguchi, Shun Kuwahara, Hisashi Mizutori, Takuya Nakase, Kyoichi Watanabe
- 2014 — gold medal
  Tomomasa Hasegawa, Yuya Kamoto, Yusuke Saito, Shotaro Shirai, Kazuyuki Takeda, Masayoshi Yamamoto
- 2018 — silver medal
  Kenta Chiba, Tomomasa Hasegawa, Fuya Maeno, Shogo Nonomura, Kakeru Tanigawa
- 2022 — silver medal
  Shohei Kawakami, Takeru Kitazono, Kakeru Tanigawa, Wataru Tanigawa, Ryota Tsumura
- 2026 — silver medal
  Daiki Hashimoto, Kiichi Kaneta, Shinnosuke Oka, Shoma Tsukiyama, Tomoharu Tsunogai

=== Asian Championships ===
- 1996 — bronze medal
- 2003 — silver medal
  Yoshihiro Saito, Akihiro Kasamatsu, Masaki Endo, Yasuhiro Ogawa
- 2006 — silver medal
  Tomoharu Sano, Hiroaki Kusu, Kazusa Fujita, Ryuta Nakazato
- 2008 — gold medal
  Naoyuki Terao, Koji Yamamuro, Yosuke Hoshi, Shoichi Yamamoto, Ryosuke Baba, Go Tagashira
- 2012 — silver medal
  Minori Koyama, Yoshiaki Furutani, Takayuki Ohara, Yu Suzuki, Rikii Hoshino, Kenzo Shirai
- 2015 — gold medal
  Naoto Hayasaka, Yusuke Tanaka, Ryohei Kato, Kazuma Kaya, Koji Yamamuro, Kenzo Shirai
- 2017 — bronze medal
  Hayato Uchida, Jun Muraoka, Shuto Horiuchi, Tatsuki Ichise, Hiroki Ishikawa
- 2019 — silver medal
  Daisuke Fudono, Hibiki Arayashiki, Minori Haruki, Tatsuki Tanaka, Jumpei Oka
- 2022 — silver medal
  Tsuyoshi Hasegawa, Daiki Hidaka, Kouki Maeda, Shiga Tachibana, Kenya Yuasa
- 2023 — silver medal
  Takeru Kitazono, Shinnosuke Oka, Fumiya Sasaki, Ryota Tsumura, Motomu Yoshida

=== Summer Universiade ===
- 1963 — gold medal
- 1965 — gold medal
- 1967 — gold medal
- 1970 — gold medal
- 1973 — silver medal
- 1977 — silver medal
- 1979 — silver medal
- 1981 —
- 1983 —
- 1985 — silver medal
- 1987 — bronze medal
- 1991 — silver medal
- 1993 —
- 1995 — gold medal
- 1997 — silver medal
- 1999 — gold medal
- 2001 — silver medal
- 2003 — bronze medal
  Masaki Endo, Akifumi Sasaki, Naoya Tabara, Yuki Yoshimura
- 2005 — gold medal
  Ryosuke Baba, Takehiro Kashima, Shun Kuwahara, Takehito Mori, Hiroyuki Tomita
- 2007 — gold medal
  Hisashi Mizutori, Koki Sakamoto, Kohei Uchimura, Kazuya Ueda,
- 2009 — gold medal
  Yosuke Hoshi, Takuya Nakase, Takuya Niijima, Makoto Okiguchi, Kyoichi Watanabe
- 2011 — gold medal
  Yodai Hojo, Hiroki Ishikawa, Ryuzo Sejima, Masayoshi Yamamoto, Shoichi Yamamoto
- 2013 — bronze medal
  Hiroki Ishikawa, Ryohei Kato, Shogo Nonomura, Yusuke Tanaka, Chihiro Yoshioka
- 2015 — gold medal
  Naoto Hayasaka, Kaito Imabayashi, Yuya Kamoto, Shogo Nonomura, Chihiro Yoshioka
- 2017 — gold medal
  Kenta Chiba, Tomomasa Hasegawa, Yuya Kamoto, Shogo Nonomura, Wataru Tanigawa
- 2019 — gold medal
  Kazuma Kaya, Kakeru Tanigawa, Wataru Tanigawa
- 2021 – silver medal
  Daiki Hashimoto, Shohei Kawakami, Kazuma Kaya, Kazuki Minami, Kaito Sugimoto

== Most Decorated Gymnasts ==
This list includes all Japanese male artistic gymnasts who have won at least six medals at the Olympic Games or the World Artistic Gymnastics Championships combined.

Rank	Gymnast	Years	Team	AA	FX	PH	SR	VT	PB	HB	Olympic Total	World Total	Total
1	Kohei Uchimura	2008–2021	2008; 2010; 2011; 2012; 2014; 2015; 2016; 2018	2008; 2009; 2010; 2011; 2012; 2013; 2014; 2015; 2016	2010; 2011; 2012; 2013				2010; 2013	2011; 2013; 2014; 2015; 2018	7	21	28
2	Eizo Kenmotsu	1968–1979	1968; 1970; 1972; 1974; 1976; 1978; 1979	1970; 1972; 1974; 1978	1970	1970; 1972; 1974; 1976			1970; 1972; 1974; 1978	1968; 1970; 1974; 1976	9	15	24
3	Akinori Nakayama	1966–1972	1966; 1968; 1970; 1972	1966; 1968; 1970; 1972	1966; 1968; 1970; 1972		1966; 1968; 1970; 1972	1966	1968; 1970	1966; 1968; 1970	10	12	22
4	Takashi Ono	1952–1964	1954; 1956; 1958; 1960; 1962; 1964	1956; 1958; 1960	1958	1956	1960	1952; 1958; 1960	1956; 1958; 1960	1956; 1960; 1962	13	8	21
5	Daiki Hashimoto	2019–2026	2019; 2020; 2022; 2023; 2024; 2026	2020; 2021; 2022; 2023; 2025; 2026	2022					2020; 2021; 2022; 2023; 2025	4	14	18
6	Yukio Endo	1960–1968	1960; 1962; 1964; 1966; 1968	1962; 1964	1962; 1964; 1966		1962	1962; 1968	1962; 1964	1962; 1966	7	10	17
7	Mitsuo Tsukahara	1968–1978	1968; 1970; 1972; 1974; 1976; 1978	1970; 1976			1970; 1972	1970; 1976	1976	1972; 1976	9	6	15
8	Koji Gushiken	1979–1985	1979; 1981; 1983; 1984	1981; 1983; 1984	1981	1979	1983; 1984	1984	1981; 1985	1984	5	10	15
9	Masao Takemoto	1952–1960	1954; 1956; 1958; 1960		1954; 1958		1956	1952; 1958	1954; 1956	1956; 1958; 1960	7	7	14
10	Sawao Kato	1968–1976	1968; 1972; 1974; 1976	1968; 1972; 1976	1968	1972	1968		1972; 1976	1972	12	1	13
11	Kenzo Shirai	2013–2018	2014; 2015; 2016; 2018	2017	2013; 2014; 2015; 2017; 2018			2016; 2017; 2018			2	11	13
12	Shigeru Kasamatsu	1972–1979	1972; 1974; 1978; 1979	1974	1972; 1974; 1978			1974	1972	1972; 1978	4	8	12
13	Kazuma Kaya	2015–2024	2015; 2018; 2019; 2020; 2023; 2024			2015; 2020; 2021			2019		3	7	10
14	Hiroyuki Tomita	2003 - 2008	2003; 2004; 2006; 2007; 2008	2003; 2005; 2006					2004; 2006		3	7	10
15	Shuji Tsurumi	1960–1966	1960; 1962; 1964; 1966	1964; 1966		1960; 1964			1964		6	3	9
16	Nobuyuki Aihara	1956–1962	1956; 1958; 1960; 1962		1956; 1960; 1962		1958				4	4	8
17	Hiroshi Kajiyama	1974–1979	1974; 1976; 1978; 1979		1974			1974; 1976	1978		2	6	8
18	Takeshi Kato	1966–1970	1966; 1968; 1970		1968; 1970	1966		1966; 1970			2	6	8
18	Takehiro Kashima	2002–2008	2003; 2004; 2008			2002; 2003; 2004; 2005				2003	3	5	8
20	Yusuke Tanaka	2011–2018	2011; 2012; 2014; 2015; 2016; 2018	2014							2	5	7
21	Naoya Tsukahara	1997–2006	2003; 2004; 2006	1997; 1999					1997; 1999		1	6	7
21	Hisashi Mizutori	2004–2007	2004; 2006; 2007	2005; 2007	2007					2007	1	6	7
23	Haruhiro Yamashita	1962–1966	1962; 1964; 1966					1962; 1964; 1966			2	4	6
24	Shinnosuke Oka	2024–2026	2024; 2026	2024					2024	2024; 2026	4	2	6
25	Takashi Mitsukuri	1960–1966	1960; 1962; 1964; 1966			1962				1966	2	4	6
26	Ryohei Kato	2013–2016	2012; 2014; 2015; 2016	2013					2014		2	4	6
27	Koji Yamamuro	2010–2016	2010; 2011; 2012; 2016	2011			2011				2	4	6
28	Wataru Tanigawa	2017–2024	2018; 2019; 2020; 2022; 2024	2022							2	4	6
29	Nobuyuki Kajitani	1979–1984	1979; 1981; 1983; 1984						1981; 1984		2	4	6

== See also ==
- Japan women's national gymnastics team
