= World Artistic Gymnastics Championships – Men's vault =

The men's vault competition at the World Artistic Gymnastics Championships was first contested in 1934. It has been held in every year since its inception.

Three medals are awarded: gold for first place, silver for second place, and bronze for third place. Tie breakers have not been used in every year. In the event of a tie between two gymnasts, both names are listed, and the following position (second for a tie for first, third for a tie for second) is left empty because a medal was not awarded for that position. If three gymnastics tied for a position, the following two positions are left empty.

== Medalists ==
Bold number in brackets denotes record number of victories.

Year	Location	Gold	Silver	Bronze
1934	(Hungary) Budapest	(Switzerland) Eugen Mack	(Switzerland) Eduard Steinemann	(Italy) Romeo Neri
1938	(Czechoslovakia) Prague	(Switzerland) Eugen Mack	(Switzerland) Walter Beck	(Switzerland) Hans Nägelin
1942	Not held due to World War II			
1950	(Switzerland) Basel	(Switzerland) Ernst Gebendinger	(Finland) Olavi Rove	(Switzerland) Walter Lehmann
1954	(Italy) Rome	(Czechoslovakia) Leo Sotorník	(West Germany) Helmut Bantz	(Soviet Union) Sergei Dzhayani
1958	(Soviet Union) Moscow	(Soviet Union) Yuri Titov	(Japan) Masao Takemoto	(Japan) Takashi Ono
1962	(Czechoslovakia) Prague	(Czechoslovakia) Přemysl Krbec	(Japan) Haruhiro Yamashita	(Japan) Yukio Endō (Soviet Union) Boris Shakhlin
1966	(West Germany) Dortmund	(Japan) Haruhiro Yamashita	(Japan) Takeshi Katō	(Japan) Akinori Nakayama
1970	(Socialist Federal Republic of Yugoslavia) Ljubljana	(Japan) Mitsuo Tsukahara	(Soviet Union) Viktor Klimenko	(Japan) Takeshi Katō
1974	(Bulgaria) Varna	(Japan) Shigeru Kasamatsu	(Soviet Union) Nikolai Andrianov	(Japan) Hiroshi Kajiyama
1978	(France) Strasbourg	(Japan) Junichi Shimizu	(Soviet Union) Nikolai Andrianov	(East Germany) Ralph Bärthel
1979	(United States) Fort Worth	(Soviet Union) Alexander Dityatin	(Soviet Union) Nikolai Andrianov	(East Germany) Ralph Bärthel (United States) Bart Conner
1981	(Soviet Union) Moscow	(East Germany) Ralf-Peter Hemmann	(Soviet Union) Artur Akopyan	(Soviet Union) Bohdan Makuts
1983	(Hungary) Budapest	(Soviet Union) Artur Akopyan	(China) Li Ning	(East Germany) Bernd Jensch
1985	(Canada) Montreal	(Soviet Union) Yuri Korolyov	(France) Laurent Barbiéri (China) Lou Yun	—N/a
1987	(Netherlands) Rotterdam	(East Germany) Sylvio Kroll (China) Lou Yun	—N/a	(Bulgaria) Dian Kolev
1989	(West Germany) Stuttgart	(East Germany) Jörg Behrend	(East Germany) Sylvio Kroll	(Soviet Union) Vladimir Artemov
1991	(United States) Indianapolis	(South Korea) Yoo Ok-ryul	(Soviet Union) Vitaly Scherbo	(Japan) Yutaka Aihara
1992	(France) Paris	(South Korea) Yoo Ok-ryul	(Commonwealth of Independent States) Ihor Korobchynskyi	(Puerto Rico) Victor Colon (Canada) Curtis Hibbert
1993	(United Kingdom) Birmingham	(Belarus) Vitaly Scherbo	(Chinese Taipei) Chang Feng-chih	(South Korea) Yoo Ok-ryul
1994	(Australia) Brisbane	(Belarus) Vitaly Scherbo	(China) Li Xiaoshuang	(South Korea) Yeo Hong-chul
1995	(Japan) Sabae	(Ukraine) Hrihoriy Misyutin (Russia) Alexei Nemov	—N/a	(Belarus) Vitaly Scherbo
1996	(Puerto Rico) San Juan	(Russia) Alexei Nemov	(Italy) Andrea Massucchi (South Korea) Yeo Hong-chul	—N/a
1997	(Switzerland) Lausanne	(Kazakhstan) Sergey Fedorchenko	(Russia) Nikolai Kryukov	(Romania) Adrian Ianculescu
1999	(China) Tianjin	(China) Li Xiaopeng	(Latvia) Jevgēņijs Saproņenko	(Switzerland) Dieter Rehm
2001	(Belgium) Ghent	(Romania) Marian Drăgulescu	(Latvia) Jevgēņijs Saproņenko	(Cuba) Charles León Tamayo
2002	(Hungary) Debrecen	(China) Li Xiaopeng	(Poland) Leszek Blanik	(China) Yang Wei
2003	(United States) Anaheim	(China) Li Xiaopeng	(Romania) Marian Drăgulescu	(Canada) Kyle Shewfelt
2005	(Australia) Melbourne	(Romania) Marian Drăgulescu	(Poland) Leszek Blanik	(Romania) Alin Jivan
2006	(Denmark) Aarhus	(Romania) Marian Drăgulescu	(Belarus) Dmitry Kasperovich	(Germany) Fabian Hambüchen
2007	(Germany) Stuttgart	(Poland) Leszek Blanik	(Romania) Ilie Daniel Popescu	(North Korea) Ri Se-gwang
2009	(United Kingdom) London	(Romania) Marian Drăgulescu (4)	(Romania) Flavius Koczi	(Russia) Anton Golotsutskov
2010	(Netherlands) Rotterdam	(France) Thomas Bouhail	(Russia) Anton Golotsutskov	(Belarus) Dmitry Kasperovich
2011	(Japan) Tokyo	(South Korea) Yang Hak-seon	(Russia) Anton Golotsutskov	(Japan) Makoto Okiguchi
2013	(Belgium) Antwerp	(South Korea) Yang Hak-seon	(United States) Steven Legendre	(United Kingdom) Kristian Thomas
2014	(China) Nanning	(North Korea) Ri Se-gwang	(Ukraine) Igor Radivilov	(United States) Jacob Dalton
2015	(United Kingdom) Glasgow	(North Korea) Ri Se-gwang	(Romania) Marian Drăgulescu	(United States) Donnell Whittenburg
2017	(Canada) Montreal	(Japan) Kenzō Shirai	(Ukraine) Igor Radivilov	(South Korea) Kim Han-sol
2018	(Qatar) Doha	(North Korea) Ri Se-gwang	(Russia) Artur Dalaloyan	(Japan) Kenzō Shirai
2019	(Germany) Stuttgart	(Russia) Nikita Nagornyy	(Russia) Artur Dalaloyan	(Ukraine) Igor Radivilov
2021	(Japan) Kitakyushu	(Philippines) Carlos Yulo	(Japan) Hidenobu Yonekura	(Israel) Andrey Medvedev
2022	(United Kingdom) Liverpool	(Armenia) Artur Davtyan	(Philippines) Carlos Yulo	(Ukraine) Igor Radivilov
2023	(Belgium) Antwerp	(United Kingdom) Jake Jarman	(United States) Khoi Young	(Ukraine) Nazar Chepurnyi
2025	(Indonesia) Jakarta	(Philippines) Carlos Yulo	(Armenia) Artur Davtyan	(Ukraine) Nazar Chepurnyi
2026	(Netherlands) Rotterdam	(Armenia) Artur Davtyan	(United Kingdom) Jake Jarman	(Norway) Sebastian Sponevik

== All-time medal count ==
Last updated after the 2026 World Championships.

Rank	Nation	Gold	Silver	Bronze	Total
1	Japan	5	4	8	17
2	Soviet Union	4	6	4	14
3	Romania	4	4	2	10
4	China	4	3	1	8
5	South Korea	4	1	3	8
6	Russia	3	5	1	9
7	Switzerland	3	2	3	8
8	East Germany	3	1	3	7
9	North Korea	3	0	1	4
10	Belarus	2	1	2	5
11	Armenia	2	1	0	3
11	Philippines	2	1	0	3
13	Czechoslovakia	2	0	0	2
14	Ukraine	1	2	4	7
15	Poland	1	2	0	3
16	Great Britain	1	1	1	3
17	France	1	1	0	2
18	Kazakhstan	1	0	0	1
19	United States	0	2	3	5
20	Latvia	0	2	0	2
21	Italy	0	1	1	2
22	CIS ^{[a]}	0	1	0	1
22	Chinese Taipei	0	1	0	1
22	Finland	0	1	0	1
22	West Germany	0	1	0	1
26	Canada	0	0	2	2
27	Bulgaria	0	0	1	1
27	Cuba	0	0	1	1
27	Germany	0	0	1	1
27	Israel	0	0	1	1
27	Norway	0	0	1	1
27	Puerto Rico	0	0	1	1
Totals (32 entries)		46	44	45	135

Note

- ^[a] Official FIG documents credit medals earned by athletes from former Soviet Union at the 1992 World Artistic Gymnastics Championships in Paris, France, as medals for CIS (Commonwealth of Independent States).

== Multiple medalists ==
Rank	Gymnast	Nation	Years	Gold	Silver	Bronze	Total
1	Marian Drăgulescu	Romania	2001–2015	4	2	0	6
2	Ri Se-gwang	North Korea	2007–2018	3	0	1	4
3	Li Xiaopeng	China	1999–2003	3	0	0	3
4	Vitaly Scherbo	Soviet Union; Belarus	1991–1995	2	1	1	4
5	Artur Davtyan	Armenia	2022–2026	2	1	0	3
5	Carlos Yulo	Philippines	2021–2025	2	1	0	3
7	Yoo Ok-ryul	South Korea	1991–1993	2	0	1	3
8	Eugen Mack	Switzerland	1934–1938	2	0	0	2
8	Alexei Nemov	Russia	1995–1996	2	0	0	2
8	Yang Hak-seon	South Korea	2011–2013	2	0	0	2
11	Leszek Blanik	Poland	2002–2007	1	2	0	3
12	Artur Akopyan	Soviet Union	1981–1983	1	1	0	2
12	Jake Jarman	Great Britain	2023–2026	1	1	0	2
12	Sylvio Kroll	East Germany	1987–1989	1	1	0	2
12	Lou Yun	China	1985–1987	1	1	0	2
12	Haruhiro Yamashita	Japan	1962–1966	1	1	0	2
17	Kenzō Shirai	Japan	2017–2018	1	0	1	2
18	Nikolai Andrianov	Soviet Union	1974–1979	0	3	0	3
19	Igor Radivilov	Ukraine	2014–2022	0	2	2	4
20	Anton Golotsutskov	Russia	2009–2011	0	2	1	3
21	Artur Dalaloyan	Russia	2018–2019	0	2	0	2
21	Jevgēņijs Saproņenko	Latvia	1999–2001	0	2	0	2
23	Dmitry Kasperovich	Belarus	2006–2010	0	1	1	2
23	Takeshi Katō	Japan	1966–1970	0	1	1	2
23	Yeo Hong-chul	South Korea	1994–1996	0	1	1	2
26	Ralph Bärthel	East Germany	1978–1979	0	0	2	2
26	Nazar Chepurnyi	Ukraine	2023–2025	0	0	2	2
