= Ryōhei Katō =

Japanese artistic gymnast

- Full name: Ryōhei Katō
- Born: September 9, 1993 (age 33) Numazu, Shizuoka Japan
- Height: 157 cm (5 ft 2 in)

Gymnastics career
- Discipline: Men's artistic gymnastics
- Country represented: Japan
- College team: Juntendo University
- Head coach: Hiroyuki Kato
Medal record
Representing Japan
Olympic Games
Gold medal – first place	2016 Rio de Janeiro	Team
Silver medal – second place	2012 London	Team
World Championships
Gold medal – first place	2015 Glasgow	Team
Silver medal – second place	2013 Antwerp	All-around
Silver medal – second place	2014 Nanning	Team
Bronze medal – third place	2014 Nanning	Parallel bars
American Cup
Gold medal – first place	2016 Newark	All-around
Silver medal – second place	2015 Arlington	All-around
Summer Universiade
Gold medal – first place	2013 Kazan	Floor exercise
Bronze medal – third place	2013 Kazan	Horizontal bar
Bronze medal – third place	2013 Kazan	Team

Ryōhei Katō (加藤 凌平, Katō Ryōhei; born 9 September 1993) is a Japanese gymnast. (Note: "Ryohei Kato". London 2012. The London Organising Committee of the Olympic Games and Paralympic Games Limited.) He has won two Olympic medals in the men's artistic team all-around – silver in 2012 (London) and gold in 2016 (Rio de Janeiro).

== Career ==
Kato together with Japanese teammates (Hiroki Ishikawa, Shogo Nonomura, Yusuke Tanaka, and Chihiro Yoshioka) competed at the 2013 Summer Universiade in Kazan where Team Japan won the bronze medal. He won gold in Floor and bronze in Horizontal Bar final. Kato competed at the 2013 World Championships along with Kōhei Uchimura, Kenzo Shirai, Koji Yamamuro, Kohei Kameyama, and Kazuhito Tanaka. He competed in the all around final and placed second, nearly two points behind teammate Uchimura.

== Personal life ==
Kato is the son of Hiroyuki Kato, a coach of Japan National team for gymnastics.
