= Nakase =

Nakase is a Japanese surname. Notable people with the surname include:

- Natalie Nakase (born 1980), American basketball coach and former player
- Rika Nakase, Japanese anime screenwriter
- Takuya Nakase (born 1982), Japanese gymnast
