= Gymnastics at the 1991 Summer Universiade =

Gymnastics competition

Gymnastics at the XVI Summer Universiade

The gymnastics competition in the 1991 Summer Universiade were held in Sheffield, United Kingdom.

== Combinated Medal table ==
Rank	Nation	Gold	Silver	Bronze	Total
1	North Korea (PRK)	10	3	4	17
2	Soviet Union (URS)	4	4	1	9
3	China (CHN)	2	4	4	10
4	Japan (JPN)	1	8	6	15
5	United States (USA)	1	1	3	5
6	South Korea (KOR)	1	0	1	2
7	Canada (CAN)	0	0	1	1
Totals (7 entries)		19	20	20	59

== Artistic gymnastics ==
=== Men's events ===
Event	Gold	Silver	Bronze
Individual all-around	Wang Zongsheng; China	Daisuke Nishikawa; Japan	Masayuki Matsunaga; Japan
Team all-around	Soviet Union (URS)	Japan (JPN)	China (CHN)
Rings	Sin Myong-su; North Korea	Igor Bespalov; Soviet Union	Daisuke Nishikawa; Japan
Bar	Pae Gil-su; North Korea	Masayuki Matsunaga; Japan	Lim Kun-gi; South Korea
Parallel bar	Andrey Kan; Soviet Union	Masayuki Matsunaga; Japan	Yutaka Aihara; Japan
Vault	Yeo Hong-chul; South Korea	Wang Zongchen; China	Aihara Yutaka; Japan
Floor	Mike Racanelli; United States	Yutaka Aihara; Japan	Sin Myong-su; North Korea
Pommel horse	Huang Huadong; China	Ma Jung; China	Dominick Minicucci; United States

=== Women's events ===
Event	Gold	Silver	Bronze
Individual all-around	Elena Sazonenkova; Soviet Union	An Myong-hwa; North Korea	Kyoko Seo; Japan
Team all-around	North Korea (PRK)	United States (USA)	Soviet Union (URS)
Uneven bars	Choe Gyong-hui; North Korea	Seo Kyoko; Japan	Chari Knight; United States
Vault	Seo Kyoko; Japan	Natalia Lashchenova; Soviet Union	An Myong-hwa; North Korea
Floor	Natalia Lashchenova; Soviet Union	Elena Sazonenkova; Soviet Union	Kristen Kenoyer; United States
Balance beam	Choe Gyong-hui; North Korea	Natalia Lashchenova; Soviet Union	Seo Kyoko; Japan

=== Medal table ===
Rank	Nation	Gold	Silver	Bronze	Total
1	North Korea (PRK)	5	1	2	8
2	Soviet Union (URS)	4	4	1	9
3	China (CHN)	2	2	1	5
4	Japan (JPN)	1	6	6	13
5	United States (USA)	1	1	3	5
6	South Korea (KOR)	1	0	1	2
Totals (6 entries)		14	14	14	42

== Rhythmic gymnastics ==
Event	Gold	Silver	Bronze
Individual all-around	Li Gyong-hui; North Korea	Li Suk-yong; North Korea	He Xiaomin; China
Rope	Li Gyong-hui; North Korea	He Xiaomin; China; Yukari Kawamoto; Japan	
Ball	Li Gyong-hui; North Korea	He Xiaomin; China	Li Suk-yong; North Korea
Clubs	Li Suk-yong; North Korea	Li Gyong-hui; North Korea	Pang Qiong; China; Susan Cushman; Canada
Ribbon	Li Suk-yong; North Korea	Yukari Kawamoto; Japan	He Xiaomin; China

=== Medal table ===
Rank	Nation	Gold	Silver	Bronze	Total
1	North Korea (PRK)	5	2	1	8
2	China (CHN)	0	2	3	5
3	Japan (JPN)	0	2	0	2
4	Canada (CAN)	0	0	1	1
Totals (4 entries)		5	6	5	16

== External sources ==
- Artistic gymnastics results at the Summer Universiade
- Rhythmic gymnastics results at the Summer Universiade (all-around)
- Rhythmic gymnastics results at the Summer Universiade (rope)
- Rhythmic gymnastics results at the Summer Universiade (hoop)
- Rhythmic gymnastics results at the Summer Universiade (ball)
- Rhythmic gymnastics results at the Summer Universiade (clubs)
