= Gymnastics at the 1992 Summer Olympics – Men's artistic team all-around =

Men's artistic team all-around at the Games of the XXV Olympiad
- Venue: Palau Sant Jordi
- Date: 29 July 1992
- Competitors: 72 from 12 nations

Medalists
| 1st place, gold medalist(s) | | Valery Belenky; Igor Korobchinski; Grigory Misutin; Vitaly Scherbo; Rustam Sharipov; Alexei Voropaev | Unified Team |
| 2nd place, silver medalist(s) | | Guo Linyao; Li Chunyang; Li Dashuang; Li Ge; Li Jing; Li Xiaoshuang | China |
| 3rd place, bronze medalist(s) | | Yutaka Aihara; Takashi Chinen; Yoshiaki Hatakeda; Yukio Iketani; Masayuki Matsunaga; Daisuke Nishikawa | Japan |

These are the results of the men's artistic team all-around competition, one of six events for male competitors of the artistic gymnastics discipline contested in the gymnastics at the 1992 Summer Olympics in Palau Sant Jordi.

== Results ==
=== Final ===
| Rank | Team | Total |
|---|---|---|
| 1st | Unified Team | 585.400 |
| 2nd | China | 583.750 |
| 3rd | Japan | 578.250 |
| 4 | Germany | 575.575 |
| 5 | Italy | 571.750 |
| 6 | United States | 571.725 |
| 7 | Romania | 571.150 |
| 8 | South Korea | 570.850 |
| 9 | Hungary | 570.525 |
| 10 | Bulgaria | 566.800 |
| 11 | Switzerland | 563.225 |
| 12 | Great Britain | 558.100 |
