= Akihiro Kasamatsu =

Japanese gymnast (born 1976)

- 笠松 昭宏
- Born: 22 July 1976 (age 50) Mie Prefecture, Japan
- Height: 1.72 m (5 ft 8 in)
- Relatives: Shigeru Kasamatsu (father); Kazue Hanyu (mother)

Gymnastics career
- Discipline: Men's artistic gymnastics
- Country represented: Japan
- Gym: Chukyo University
Medal record
Representing Japan
Asian Games
Bronze medal – third place	1998 Bangkok	Team

Akihiro Kasamatsu (笠松 昭宏, Kasamatsu Akihiro; born 22 July 1976) is a Japanese gymnast. In the 1998 Asian Games, he won a bronze medal in the team event. He competed at the 2000 Summer Olympics.
