= Hiroshi Nosaka =

Japanese gymnast

- 野坂 浩
- Born: 1 October 1914 Tokyo, Empire of Japan
- Died: 19 August 2004 (aged 89) Aoba-ku, Yokohama, Japan

Gymnastics career
- Discipline: Men's artistic gymnastics
- Country represented: Japan

Hiroshi Nosaka (野坂浩, Nosaka Hiroshi; 1 October 1914 – 19 August 2004) was a Japanese gymnast. He competed in eight events at the 1936 Summer Olympics.
