= Shun Fujimoto =

Japanese artistic gymnast

- Born: May 11, 1950 (age 76) Hiroshima Prefecture, Japan

Gymnastics career
- Discipline: Men's artistic gymnastics
- Country represented: Japan
Medal record
Representing Japan
Olympic Games
| Gold medal – first place | 1976 Montreal | Team |

Shun Fujimoto (藤本 俊, Fujimoto Shun; born May 11, 1950) is a retired Japanese gymnast.

He represented Japan at the 1976 Summer Olympics in Montreal, where he won gold in the team competition.

Fujimoto won fame by continuing to compete in the team event right after severely injuring his right knee during his floor exercise. He scored 9.5 on the pommel horse and 9.7 on the still rings with the badly damaged knee, dismounting from the rings from eight feet above ground and keeping his balance after landing on his feet. One source has described the scene thus: that he "raised his arms in a perfect finish before collapsing in agony". That account, however, is erroneous.

Video of Fujimoto's rings routine, including the dismount and immediate aftermath, is easily accessible on the internet, and it is unambiguously clear that, despite the physical agony of performing his routine and landing, he did not collapse after completing his dismount. Instead, immediately upon his landing, as Fujimoto's knees bent to absorb the shock, his right knee started to give way, wobbling and almost collapsing. But he controlled his balance, taking a very slight hop on his left foot, bringing his feet together, straightening his legs and body to a fully upright position, and raising his arms to complete the landing posture. He then turned and walked from the apparatus, and down the steps from the competition platform. He was limping markedly, but made it back to his seat without ever collapsing.

Nevertheless, the dismount aggravated his already serious injury, dislocating his broken kneecap and tearing ligaments in his right leg. Doctors ordered him to withdraw from further competition or risk permanent disability. One doctor stated:

"How he managed to do somersaults and twists and land without collapsing in screams is beyond my comprehension."

Fujimoto stated that he had not wanted to let his team down by revealing his injury. His completing of the pommel horse and rings events enabled the team to win gold, defeating the team from the Soviet Union by a narrow margin. Later, when asked whether he would do what he did again, he replied frankly, "No, I would not."

Fujimoto's performing in spite of serious injury was humorously alluded to in The Simpsons episode, "Lisa's First Word".

In 2017, Fujimoto was inducted into the International Gymnastics Hall of Fame.
