= Yoshio Miyake =

Japanese gymnast

- 三宅 芳夫
- Born: 7 December 1913
- Died: 26 April 1983 (aged 69)

Gymnastics career
- Discipline: Men's artistic gymnastics
- Country represented: Japan
- Gym: Japan Gymnastics School

Yoshio Miyake (三宅芳夫, Miyake Yoshio; 7 December 1913 – 26 April 1983) was a Japanese gymnast. He competed in eight events at the 1936 Summer Olympics.
