= Shuji Tsurumi =

Japanese gymnast (born 1938)

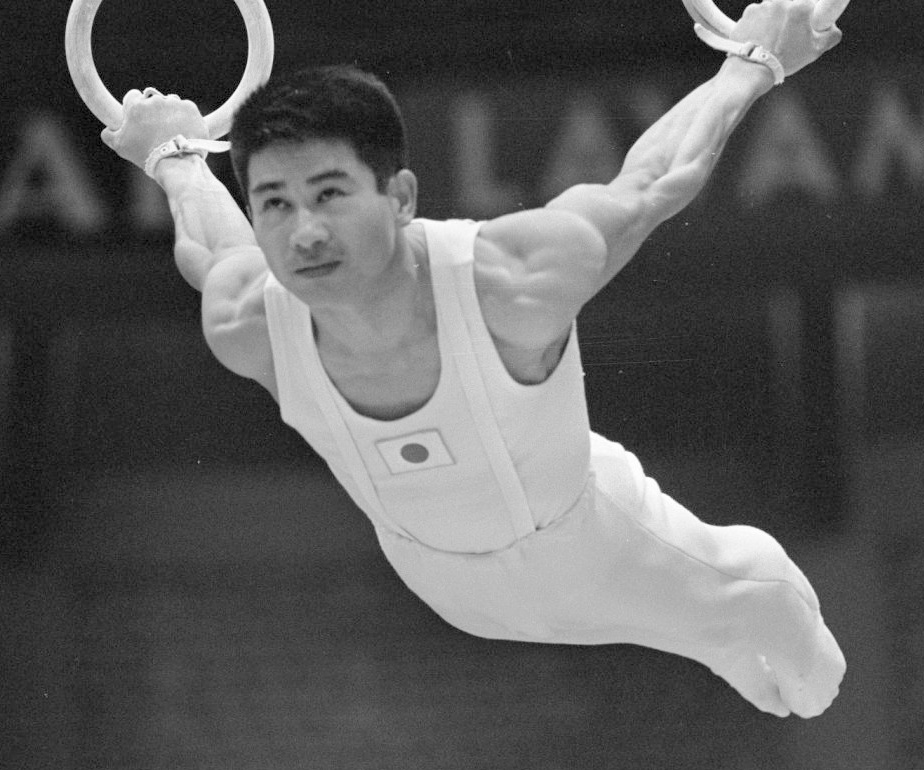
- Shuji Tsurumi in 1966

Personal information
- Born: January 29, 1938 (age 88) Tokyo, Japan
- Height: 1.58 m (5 ft 2 in)

Gymnastics career
- Discipline: Men's artistic gymnastics
- Country represented: Japan
Medal record
Olympic Games
Gold medal – first place	1960 Rome	Team
Gold medal – first place	1964 Tokyo	Team
Silver medal – second place	1964 Tokyo	All-around individual
Silver medal – second place	1964 Tokyo	Pommel horse
Silver medal – second place	1964 Tokyo	Parallel bars
Bronze medal – third place	1960 Rome	Pommel horse

Shuji Tsurumi (鶴見 修治, Tsurumi Shūji; born January 29, 1938) is a Japanese gymnast and Olympic champion. He was part of the first Japanese team that succeeded to win gold medals in the team event at the Summer Olympics (1960) and World Championships (1962). In 2008 he was inducted to the International Gymnastics Hall of Fame.

== Olympics ==
Tsurumi competed at the 1960 Summer Olympics in Rome where he received a gold medal in team combined exercises, and a bronze medal in pommel horse. At the 1964 Summer Olympics in Tokyo he received a gold medal in team combined exercises, and silver medals in individual all-around, pommel horse, and parallel bars.

== World Championships ==
Tsurumi received a silver medal in individual all-around at the 1966 World Artistic Gymnastics Championships, and Japan won the team competition.
