= Masami Kubota =

Japanese artistic gymnast (born 1931)

- 久保田 正躬
- Born: 6 December 1931 (age 94) Okayama, Empire of Japan
- Spouse: Kyoko Kubota

Gymnastics career
- Discipline: Men's artistic gymnastics
- Country represented: Japan
Medal record
Men's artistic gymnastics
Representing Japan
Olympic Games
Silver medal – second place	1956 Melbourne	Team
Silver medal – second place	1956 Melbourne	Parallel bars
Bronze medal – third place	1956 Melbourne	Rings

Masami Kubota (久保田正躬, Kubota Msami; born 6 December 1931) is a Japanese former gymnast who competed in the 1956 Summer Olympics.
