= Daisuke Nishikawa =

Japanese artistic gymnast (born 1970)

- Full name: 西川 大輔 Nishikawa Daisuke
- Born: June 2, 1970 (age 56)

Gymnastics career
- Discipline: Men's artistic gymnastics
- Country represented: Japan
Medal record
Representing Japan
Olympic Games
Bronze medal – third place	1988 Seoul	Team
Bronze medal – third place	1992 Barcelona	Team
World Championships
Silver medal – second place	1995 Sabae	Team
Bronze medal – third place	1991 Indianapolis	Floor
Asian Games
Silver medal – second place	1990 Beijing	Team
Bronze medal – third place	1994 Hiroshima	Team
Universiade
Silver medal – second place	1991 Sheffield	Individual
Silver medal – second place	1991 Sheffield	Team

Daisuke Nishikawa (born 2 June 1970) is a retired Japanese gymnast who competed in the 1988 Summer Olympics and in the 1992 Summer Olympics, where he won bronze medals in both team events.
