= Gymnastics at the 1985 Summer Universiade =

Gymnastics competition

The gymnastics competitions in the 1985 Summer Universiade were held in Kobe, Japan.

== Men's events ==
Event	Gold	Silver	Bronze
Individual all-around	Dmitry Bilozerchev (URS)	Valentin Mogilny (URS)	Hiroyuki Okabe (JPN); Mitsuaki Watanabe (JPN)
Horizontal Bar	Valentin Mogilny (URS)	Dmitry Bilozerchev (URS); Zsolt Borkai (HUN)	
Parallel Bars	Dmitry Bilozerchev (URS)	Li Chul-hun (PRK)	Brad Peters (CAN)
Vault	Casimiro Suárez (CUB)	Israel Sánchez (CUB)	Huang Wofu (CHN)
Pommel Horse	Dmitry Bilozerchev (URS); Valentin Mogilny (URS)		Zsolt Borkai (HUN)
Rings	Dmitry Bilozerchev (URS)	Fu L. (CHN); Kim Su (PRK)	
Floor Exercise	Huang Wofu (CHN); Dmitry Bilozerchev (URS)		Han C. (KOR)
Team all-around	Soviet Union (URS)	Japan (JPN)	China (CHN)

== Women's events ==
Event	Gold	Silver	Bronze
Individual all-around	Natalia Yurchenko (URS)	Ecaterina Szabo (ROM)	Tatiana Frolova (URS)
Uneven Bars	Natalia Yurchenko (URS)	Ecaterina Szabo (ROM)	Kim Gun-oh (PRK)
Balance Beam	Ecaterina Szabo (ROM)	Sun You (CHN)	Yan Yanli (CHN)
Vault	Ecaterina Szabo (ROM)	Natalia Yurchenko (URS)	L. Harisova (URS)
Floor exercise	Natalia Yurchenko (URS)	Ecaterina Szabo (ROM)	Maiko Morio (JPN)
Team all-around	Soviet Union (URS)	Romania (ROM)	China (CHN)

=== Medal table ===
Rank	Nation	Gold	Silver	Bronze	Total
1	Soviet Union (URS)	12	3	1	16
2	Romania (ROU)	2	4	0	6
3	China (CHN)	1	2	4	7
4	Cuba (CUB)	1	1	0	2
5	North Korea (PRK)	0	2	1	3
6	Japan (JPN)	0	1	3	4
7	Hungary (HUN)	0	1	1	2
8	Canada (CAN)	0	0	1	1
8	South Korea (KOR)	0	0	1	1
Totals (9 entries)		16	14	12	42
