= Gymnastics at the 1988 Summer Olympics – Men's artistic team all-around =

Men's artistic team all-around at the Games of the XXIV Olympiad

Medalists
1st place, gold medalist(s)		Vladimir Artemov, Dmitri Bilozertchev, Vladimir Gogoladze, Sergei Kharkov, Valeri Liukin, and Vladimir Nouvikov	Soviet Union
2nd place, silver medalist(s)		Holger Behrendt, Ralf Büchner, Ulf Hoffmann, Sylvio Kroll, Sven Tippelt, and Andreas Wecker	East Germany
3rd place, bronze medalist(s)		Yukio Iketani, Hiroyuki Konishi, Koichi Mizushima, Daisuke Nishikawa, Toshiharu Sato, and Takahiro Yameda	Japan

These are the results of the men's team all-around competition, one of eight events for male competitors in artistic gymnastics at the 1988 Summer Olympics in Seoul. The compulsory and optional rounds took place on September 18 and 20 at the Olympic Gymnastics Hall.

== Results ==
The final score for each team was determined by combining all of the scores earned by the team on each apparatus during the compulsory and optional rounds. If all six gymnasts on a team performed a routine on a single apparatus during compulsories or optionals, only the five highest scores on that apparatus counted toward the team total.

Rank	Team	Total
Gold medal	Soviet Union	593.350
Silver medal	East Germany	588.450
Bronze medal	Japan	585.600
4	China	585.250
5	Bulgaria	585.100
6	Hungary	582.300
7	Romania	581.700
8	Italy	579.000
9	Canada	578.800
10	France	576.850
11	United States	576.850
12	West Germany	574.100
