= Dokan Sone =

Japanese gymnast (1914–1992)

- 曽根 道貫
- Born: 30 October 1914 Takashi, Jōetsu, Niigata, Empire of Japan
- Died: 1992 (aged 77–78)

Gymnastics career
- Discipline: Men's artistic gymnastics
- Country represented: Japan

Dokan Sone (曽根道貫, Sone Dōkan; born 30 October 1914 – 1992) was a Japanese gymnast. He competed in eight events at the 1936 Summer Olympics.
