= Shigeru Kurihara =

Japanese artistic gymnast

- 栗原 茂
- Born: 7 April 1970 (age 56) Saitama Prefecture, Japan
- Height: 1.62 m (5 ft 4 in)

Gymnastics career
- Discipline: Men's artistic gymnastics
- Country represented: Japan
- Club: Daiwa Bank

Shigeru Kurihara (栗原茂, Kurihara Shigeru; born 7 April 1970) is a Japanese gymnast. He competed at the 1996 Summer Olympics.
