= Kiichiro Toyama =

Japanese gymnast

- 遠山 喜一郎
- Born: 22 November 1909 Hitachi, Ibaraki, Empire of Japan
- Died: 15 September 1999 (aged 89)

Gymnastics career
- Discipline: Men's artistic gymnastics
- Country represented: Japan
- Club: Kumamoto Normal School

Kiichiro Toyama (遠山喜一郎, Tōyama Kiichirō; 22 November 1909 – 15 September 1999) was a Japanese gymnast. He competed in eight events at the 1936 Summer Olympics.
