= Toshiharu Sato =

Japanese artistic gymnast

- Born: 19 March 1969 (age 57)

Gymnastics career
- Discipline: Men's artistic gymnastics
- Country represented: Japan
Medal record
Representing Japan
Olympic Games
Bronze medal – third place	1988 Seoul	Team
World Championships
Silver medal – second place	1995 Sabae	Team
Asian Games
Silver medal – second place	1990 Beijing	Team
Bronze medal – third place	1990 Beijing	Parallel Bars
Bronze medal – third place	1994 Hiroshima	Team
Bronze medal – third place	1994 Hiroshima	Floor Exercise

Toshiharu Sato (佐藤 寿治, Satō Toshiharu; born 19 March 1969) is a Japanese former gymnast who competed in the 1988 Summer Olympics and in the 1996 Summer Olympics and won an Olympic bronze medal.
