= Yusuke Tanaka (gymnast) =

Japanese artistic gymnast

Yūsuke Tanaka
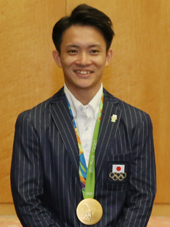
- 2016

Personal information
- Full name: Yūsuke Tanaka
- Born: November 29, 1989 (age 36)
- Height: 166 cm (5 ft 5 in)

Gymnastics career
- Discipline: Men's artistic gymnastics
- Country represented: Japan
Medal record
Representing Japan
Olympic Games
Gold medal – first place	2016 Rio de Janeiro	Team
Silver medal – second place	2012 London	Team
World Championships
Gold medal – first place	2015 Glasgow	Team
Silver medal – second place	2011 Tokyo	Team
Silver medal – second place	2014 Nanning	Team
Bronze medal – third place	2014 Nanning	All-around
Bronze medal – third place	2018 Doha	Team
Summer Universiade
Silver medal – second place	2013 Kazan	Horizontal bar
Bronze medal – third place	2013 Kazan	Team

Yūsuke Tanaka (田中 佑典, Tanaka Yūsuke; born November 29, 1989) is a Japanese gymnast. He has won two Olympic medals in the men's artistic team all-around – silver in 2012 (London) and gold in 2016 (Rio de Janeiro).

== Personal life ==
Tanaka was born on November 29, 1989, in Wakayama. His elder brother is Kazuhito Tanaka and an elder sister is Rie Tanaka.

== Career ==
Tanaka won a silver medal at the 2012 Summer Olympics in the men's artistic team all-around.

At the 2013 Summer Universiade in Kazan, Tanaka won silver on the horizontal bar and the team bronze medal (with Hiroki Ishikawa, Shogo Nonomura, Ryohei Kato and Chihiro Yoshioka). He won the team gold medal at the 2015 World Championships and at the 2016 Summer Olympics.
