= Takashi Kondo (disambiguation) =

Takashi Kondō is a voice actor

Takashi Kondo may also refer to:

- Takashi Kondo (footballer)
- Takashi Kondo (gymnast)
