= Hikaru Tanaka =

Japanese gymnast

- 田中 光
- Born: 19 July 1972 (age 54) Tanabe, Wakayama, Japan
- Height: 1.63 m (5 ft 4 in)

Gymnastics career
- Discipline: Men's artistic gymnastics
- Country represented: Japan
- Gym: Orange Gymnastics Club
Medal record
Representing Japan
Asian Games
Bronze medal – third place	1994 Hiroshima	Team

Hikaru Tanaka (田中 光, Tanaka Hikaru; born 19 July 1972) is a Japanese gymnast. He finished in eighteenth place in the all around at the 1996 Summer Olympics.
