= Takashi Mitsukuri =

Japanese artistic gymnast

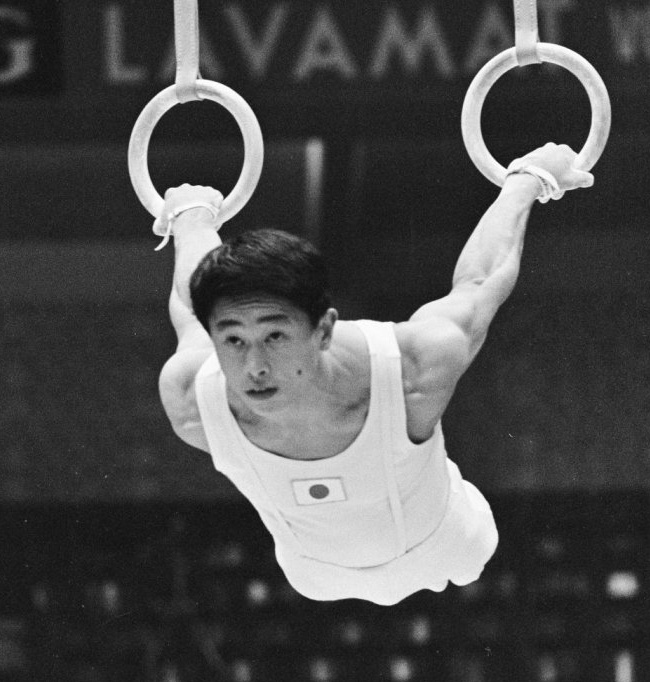
- Takashi Mitsukuri in 1966

Personal information
- Born: February 19, 1939 (age 87) Toyama, Japan
- Height: 1.61 m (5 ft 3 in)

Gymnastics career
- Discipline: Men's artistic gymnastics
- Country represented: Japan
Medal record
Olympic Games
Gold medal – first place	1960 Rome	Team
Gold medal – first place	1964 Tokyo	Team

Takashi Mitsukuri (三栗 崇, Mitsukuri Takashi; born February 19, 1939) is a Japanese gymnast and Olympic champion.

Mitsukuri competed at the 1960 Summer Olympics in Rome where he received a gold medal in team combined exercises. At the 1964 Summer Olympics in Tokyo he again received a gold medal in team combined exercises with the Japanese team. Individually, he performed best on the pommel horse, finishing in fourth and sixth place in 1960 and 1964, respectively.

Mitsukuri received a bronze medal in pommel horse at the 1962 World Artistic Gymnastics Championships, and Japan won the team competition. He received a bronze medal in horizontal bar at the 1966 World Artistic Gymnastics Championships, and Japan won the team competition again.

His wife Taniko Nakamura-Mitsukuri is also a retired Olympic gymnast.
