= Yoshiaki Hatakeda =

Japanese artistic gymnast

- Born: 12 May 1972 (age 54)

Gymnastics career
- Discipline: Men's artistic gymnastics
- Country represented: Japan
Medal record
Representing Japan
Olympic Games
Bronze medal – third place	1992 Barcelona	Team
World Championships
Silver medal – second place	1995 Sabae	Team
Silver medal – second place	1995 Sabae	Pommel horse
Silver medal – second place	1995 Sabae	Horizontal bar
Asian Games
Gold medal – first place	1994 Hiroshima	Pommel Horse
Silver medal – second place	1990 Beijing	Team
Bronze medal – third place	1990 Beijing	Horizontal Bar
Bronze medal – third place	1994 Hiroshima	Team
Bronze medal – third place	1994 Hiroshima	All-Around

Yoshiaki Hatakeda (畠田 好章, Hatakeda Yoshiaki; born 12 May 1972) is a Japanese former gymnast who competed in the 1992 Summer Olympics and in the 1996 Summer Olympics.

He is the father of Hitomi Hatakeda and Chiaki Hatakeda, members of Japan's women's national team and candidates for the 2020 Olympic Games in Tokyo.
