= Hikoroku Arimoto =

Japanese artistic gymnast

- 有本 彦六
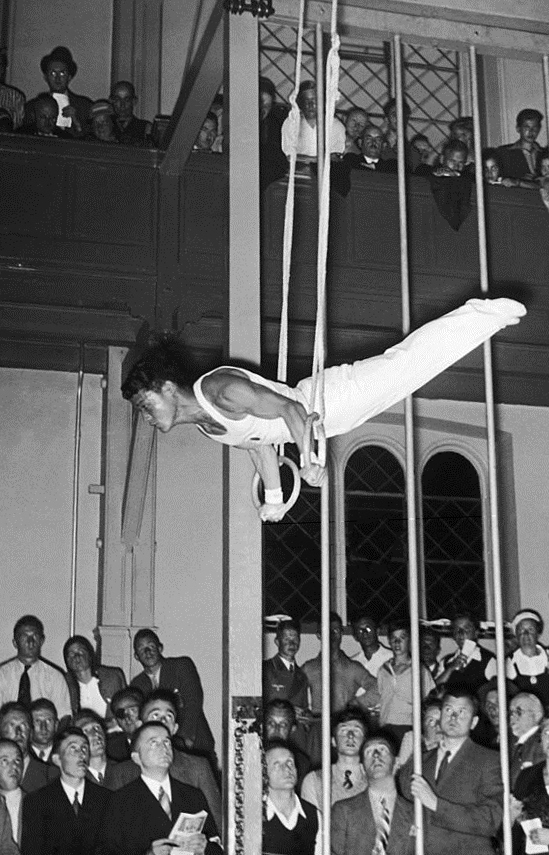
- Arimoto at the 1936 Summer Olympics

Personal information
- Born: 11 October 1915
- Died: May 1945 (aged 29) East China Sea

Gymnastics career
- Discipline: Men's artistic gymnastics
- Country represented: Japan
- Gym: Japan Gymnastics School

Hikoroku Arimoto (有本 彦六; October 11, 1915 – May 1945) was a Japanese artistic gymnast. He competed at the 1936 Summer Olympics and finished ninth with the Japanese team. His best individual result was 35th place on the floor. He died in World War II.
