= Nobuyuki Aihara =

Japanese artistic gymnast

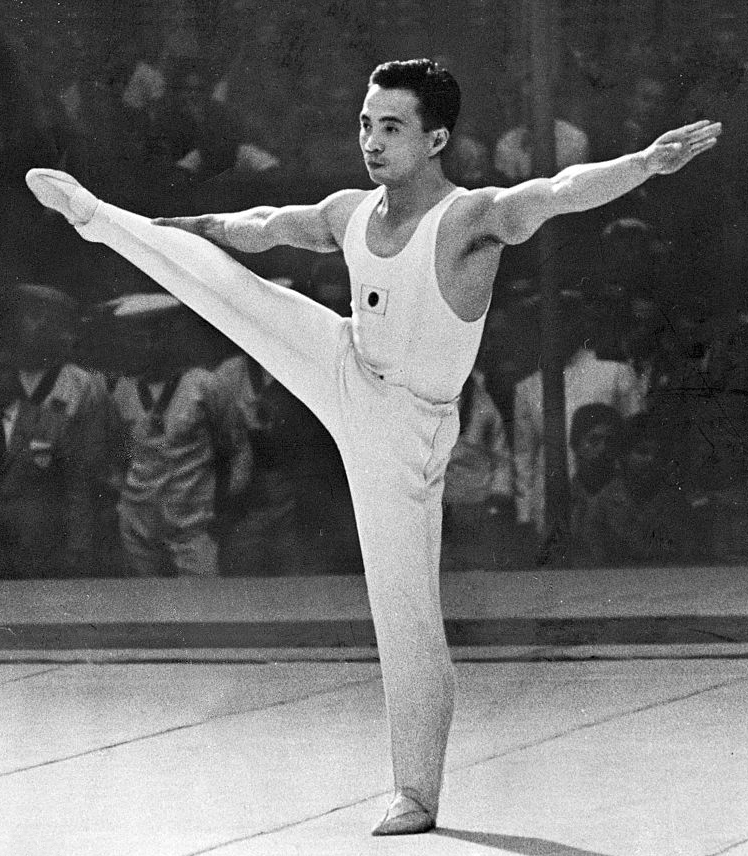
- Aihara at the 1960 Olympics

Personal information
- Born: December 16, 1934 Takasaki, Gunma, Japan
- Died: July 16, 2013 (aged 78) Takasaki, Gunma, Japan
- Height: 1.54 m (5 ft 1 in)

Gymnastics career
- Discipline: Men's artistic gymnastics
- Country represented: Japan
Medal record
Representing Japan
Olympic Games
Gold medal – first place	1960 Rome	Floor
Gold medal – first place	1960 Rome	Team
Silver medal – second place	1956 Melbourne	Floor
Silver medal – second place	1956 Melbourne	Team
World Championships
Gold medal – first place	1962 Prague	Team
Gold medal – first place	1962 Prague	Floor
Silver medal – second place	1958 Moscow	Team
Silver medal – second place	1958 Moscow	Rings

Nobuyuki Aihara (相原 信行, Aihara Nobuyuki; December 16, 1934 – July 16, 2013) was a Japanese gymnast. He was the father of Yutaka Aihara, also a gymnast.

Nobuyuki competed at the 1956 Olympics and won a silver medal in floor exercise and a silver medal in the team competition. Four years later he won gold medals in these events.

Aihara took up gymnastic at the age of 15 while studying at the Nippon Sport Science University. He was coached by his future teammate Masao Takemoto. In 1964 he married Toshiko Shirasu-Aihara, a fellow gymnast. Because of an injury he missed the Tokyo Olympics that year, and soon retired to become a gymnastics coach. In 1979 he founded the Aihara Gymnastics Club.

Aihara died of pneumonia on July 16, 2013, at the age of 78.
