= Gymnastics at the 1972 Summer Olympics – Men's floor =

Men's floor at the Games of the XX Olympiad

Medalists
| 1st place, gold medalist(s) | | Nikolai Andrianov | Soviet Union |
| 2nd place, silver medalist(s) | | Akinori Nakayama | Japan |
| 3rd place, bronze medalist(s) | | Shigeru Kasamatsu | Japan |

These are the results of the men's floor competition, one of eight events for male competitors in artistic gymnastics at the 1972 Summer Olympics in Munich. The qualification and final rounds took place on August 27, 29 and September 1 at the Sports Hall.

== Results ==
=== Qualification ===
One-hundred thirteen gymnasts competed in the compulsory and optional rounds on August 27 and 29. The six highest scoring gymnasts advanced to the final on ___.

=== Final ===
| Rank | Gymnast | C | O | Prelim | Final | Total |
|---|---|---|---|---|---|---|
| Gold medal | Nikolai Andrianov (URS) | 9.600 | 9.450 | 9.525 | 9.650 | 19.175 |
| Silver medal | Akinori Nakayama (JPN) | 9.400 | 9.650 | 9.525 | 9.600 | 19.125 |
| Bronze medal | Shigeru Kasamatsu (JPN) | 9.450 | 9.600 | 9.525 | 9.500 | 19.025 |
| 4 | Eizo Kenmotsu (JPN) | 9.400 | 9.650 | 9.525 | 9.400 | 18.925 |
| 5 | Klaus Koste (GDR) | 9.500 | 9.550 | 9.525 | 9.300 | 18.825 |
| 6 | Sawao Kato (JPN) | 9.500 | 9.600 | 9.550 | 9.200 | 18.750 |
