= Takashi Uchiyama (gymnast) =

Japanese gymnast

- 内山 隆
- Born: 18 August 1974 (age 52) Saitama Prefecture, Japan
- Height: 1.57 m (5 ft 2 in)

Gymnastics career
- Discipline: Men's artistic gymnastics
- Country represented: Japan

Takashi Uchiyama (内山隆, Uchiyama Takashi; born 18 August 1974) is a Japanese gymnast. He competed at the 1996 Summer Olympics.
