= Hiroshi Matsunobu =

Japanese gymnast

- 松延 博
- Born: 15 October 1915

Gymnastics career
- Discipline: Men's artistic gymnastics
- Country represented: Japan

Hiroshi Matsunobu (松延 博, Matsunobu Hiroshi; born 15 October 1915, date of death unknown) was a Japanese gymnast. He competed in eight events at the 1936 Summer Olympics.
