= Takuya Nakase =

Japanese artistic gymnast

- Born: 19 November 1982 (age 43) Otsu, Shiga, Japan

Gymnastics career
- Discipline: Men's artistic gymnastics
- Country represented: Japan
Medal record
Olympic Games
Silver medal – second place	2008 Beijing	Team
World Championships
Silver medal – second place	2007 Stuttgart	Team
Bronze medal – third place	2006 Aarhus	Team
Pacific Rim Championships
Silver medal – second place	2012 Everett	Rings
Silver medal – second place	2012 Everett	Team
Asian Games
Silver medal – second place	2010 Guangzhou	Team

Takuya Nakase (中瀬卓也, Nakase Takuya; born 19 November 1982 in Ōtsu, Shiga) is a Japanese artistic gymnast.
