= Takashi Chinen =

Japanese artistic gymnast

Takashi Chinen 知念孝
- Born: March 25, 1967 (age 59) Ishikawa, Uruma, Okinawa Prefecture, Japan
- Height: 1.57 m (5 ft 2 in)

Gymnastics career
- Discipline: Men's artistic gymnastics
- Country represented: Japan
Medal record
Representing Japan
Men's gymnastics
Bronze medal – third place	1992 Barcelona	Team
Asian Games
Silver medal – second place	1994 Hiroshima	Team

Takashi Chinen (知念孝, Chinen Takashi; born March 25, 1967) is a Japanese former artistic gymnast who competed in the 1992 Summer Olympics and won a bronze medal in the men's team event. He also won a team bronze medal at the 1994 Asian Games.

== Personal life ==
Chinen was born in Ishikawa, a former city that is now a district of Uruma, Okinawa Prefecture. He studied at Nihon University. He is the father of Yuri Chinen (born 1993), an actor, dancer, voice actor, talent, singer and member of the idol group Hey! Say! JUMP.

== Career ==
Chinen won the All-Japan Gymnastics Championships title in the pommel horse finals twice, in 1989 and 1993.

In 1991, he competed at the 1991 World Championships, where he placed fourth in the team event.

In 1992, Chinen placed second at the NHK Trophy, held in May. He was selected to compete as part of the Japanese men's team at the 1992 Summer Olympics in Barcelona. In the team event, he won the bronze medal with his teammates. His was the first and, until Shohei Yabiku won a bronze medal in wrestling at the 2020 Summer Olympics, the only Olympic medal won by someone from the Ryukyu Islands. He placed 27th in the individual all-around and was the first reserve for the pommel horse final.

The next year, Chinen competed at the 1993 World Championships. He placed 32nd in the qualification round and did not advance to the finals.

In 1994, he competed at the 1994 Goodwill Games, where he qualified for the floor exercise final and placed 5th. Later in the year, he competed at the Asian Games and won bronze in the team event.

After retiring from competition, Chinen has worked as a coach.
