= Kōhei Kameyama =

Japanese artistic gymnast

Kohei Kameyama
- Nickname: Kame
- Born: 28 December 1988 (age 37) Sendai, Japan
- Height: 1.70 m (5 ft 7 in)

Gymnastics career
- Discipline: Men's artistic gymnastics
- Country represented: Japan (2010–2021)
- Club: Tokushukai Gymnastics Club
- Head coach: Isao Yoneda
Medal record
Representing Japan
World Championships
Gold medal – first place	2013 Antwerp	Pommel horse
Silver medal – second place	2014 Nanning	Team

Kohei Kameyama (亀山 耕平, Kameyama Kōhei; born 28 December 1988) is a Japanese former artistic gymnast. He is 2013 World champion on the pommel horse, and he won a silver medal in the team event at the 2014 World Championships. He represented Japan at the 2020 Summer Olympics and finished fifth on the pommel horse.

== Gymnastics career ==
Kameyama began gymnastics when he was six years old, as his mother was a former gymnast.

Kameyama won the pommel horse gold medal at the 2013 World Championships with a score of 15.833. He was selected to compete with the Japanese team at the 2014 World Championships, and they won the silver medal behind China. He won the pommel horse title at the 2014 Toyota International despite a fall because of his 7.0 difficulty score.

Kameyama announced his retirement after not being selected to compete at the 2016 Summer Olympics. However, his coach encouraged him to stay in the sport and aim for the 2020 Summer Olympics. He said, “not being chosen for Rio destroyed me,” but he shared that after the experience, he focused on his mental health and staying motivated.

At the 2018 Koper World Challenge Cup, Kameyama won the pommel horse final. He also won the pommel horse event at the 2019 Baku World Cup. He then won the silver medal at the 2019 Doha World Cup after losing the execution-score tiebreaker to Lee Chih-kai.

Kameyama made his Olympic debut at the age of 32 when he participated in the 2020 Summer Olympics in Tokyo as one of the two apparatus individuals allocated to the Japanese team. He qualified for the pommel horse final tied in second place with Rhys McClenaghan. He ultimately placed fifth in the final.
