= Masayuki Matsunaga =

Japanese artistic gymnast (born 1970)

- Born: 23 March 1970 (age 56)

Gymnastics career
- Discipline: Men's artistic gymnastics
- Country represented: Japan
Medal record
Representing Japan
Olympic Games
Bronze medal – third place	1992 Barcelona	Team
Bronze medal – third place	1992 Barcelona	Parallel bars
World Championships
Silver medal – second place	1995 Sabae	Team
Asian Games
Silver medal – second place	1990 Beijing	Team
Bronze medal – third place	1990 Beijing	Rings
Bronze medal – third place	1994 Hiroshima	Team

Masayuki Matsunaga (松永政行, Matsunaga Masayuki; born 23 March 1970) is a Japanese former gymnast who competed in the 1992 Summer Olympics.
