= Mitsuaki Watanabe =

Japanese artistic gymnast

Gymnastics career
- Discipline: Men's artistic gymnastics
- Country represented: Japan
Medal record
Men's artistic gymnastics
Representing Japan
World Championships
Bronze medal – third place	1985 Montreal	Horizontal Bar
Bronze medal – third place	1983 Budapest	Team

Mitsuaki Watanabe (渡邊光昭, Watanabe Mitsuaki) is a Japanese artistic gymnast. He won the bronze medal on horizontal bars at the 1985 World Artistic Gymnastics Championships in Montreal, placing behind Tong Fei and Sylvio Kroll. This was his second World Championship medal after being on the bronze medal-winning Japanese team in the 1983 Budapest World Championships.
