= Shigeru Kasamatsu =

Japanese artistic gymnast

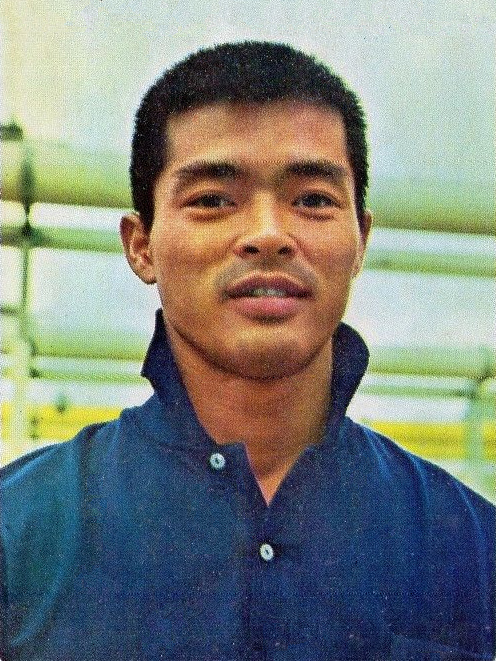

Personal information
- Born: July 16, 1947 (age 79) Kumano, Japan
- Height: 1.73 m (5 ft 8 in)

Gymnastics career
- Discipline: Men's artistic gymnastics
- Country represented: Japan
- Eponymous skills: Kasamatsu (vault)
- Retired: 1979
Medal record
Olympic Games
| Gold medal – first place | 1972 Munich | Team |
| Silver medal – second place | 1972 Munich | Parallel bars |
| Bronze medal – third place | 1972 Munich | Horizontal bar |
| Bronze medal – third place | 1972 Munich | Floor exercise |
World Championships
| Gold medal – first place | 1974 Varna | Team |
| Gold medal – first place | 1974 Varna | All-around |
| Gold medal – first place | 1974 Varna | Floor |
| Gold medal – first place | 1974 Varna | Vault |
| Gold medal – first place | 1978 Strasbourg | Team |
| Gold medal – first place | 1978 Strasbourg | Horizontal bar |
| Silver medal – second place | 1978 Strasbourg | Floor |
| Silver medal – second place | 1979 Fort Worth | Team |

Shigeru Kasamatsu (笠松 茂, Kasamatsu Shigeru; born July 16, 1947) is a retired Japanese artistic gymnast. He competed at the 1972 Olympics and won a gold medal with the Japanese team. Individually he won a silver on parallel bars and bronze medals on the floor and horizontal bar. Kasamatsu won six world titles in 1974 and 1978. The Kasamatsu vault is named after him. In 2006, he was inducted into the International Gymnastics Hall of Fame. His wife Kazue Hanyu and son Akihiro Kasamatsu are also retired Olympic gymnasts.

Kasamatsu took up gymnastics in 1957, but had his first major achievement only in 1970, when he finished second all-around in the Chunichi Cup. He had to withdraw from the 1976 Olympics due to an emergency appendectomy.
