= Makoto Okiguchi =

Japanese artistic gymnast

- Born: 22 November 1985 (age 40) Osaka, Japan

Gymnastics career
- Discipline: Men's artistic gymnastics
- Country represented: Japan
Medal record
Olympic Games
Silver medal – second place	2008 Beijing	Team
World Championships
Silver medal – second place	2007 Stuttgart	Team
Silver medal – second place	2011 Tokyo	Team
Bronze medal – third place	2011 Tokyo	Vault

Makoto Okiguchi (沖口 誠, Okiguchi Makoto; born 22 November 1985 in Osaka) is a Japanese gymnast.
