= Gymnastics at the 2016 Summer Olympics – Men's artistic team all-around =

Men's artistic team all-around at the Games of the XXXI Olympiad
- Venue: HSBC Arena
- Date: 8 August 2016
- Competitors: 40 from 8 nations
- Winning total: 274.094 points

Medalists
1st place, gold medalist(s)		Ryōhei Katō; Kenzō Shirai; Yūsuke Tanaka; Kōhei Uchimura; Koji Yamamuro	Japan
2nd place, silver medalist(s)		Denis Ablyazin; David Belyavskiy; Ivan Stretovich; Nikolai Kuksenkov; Nikita Nagornyy	Russia
3rd place, bronze medalist(s)		Deng Shudi; Lin Chaopan; Liu Yang; You Hao; Zhang Chenglong	China

The Men's artistic gymnastics team all-around (AA) competition at the 2016 Summer Olympics in Rio de Janeiro was held on 8 August 2016 at the HSBC Arena.

The medals were presented by Tsunekazu Takeda (Japan), Ivo Ferriani (Italy) and Luis Alberto Moreno (Colombia) and members of the International Olympic Committee. Gifts were presented by Bruno Grandi (President of the FIG), Michel Léglise (Vice President of the FIG) and Jani Tanskanen (President of the Athletes' Commission for the FIG).

== Competition format ==
The top 8 teams in qualifications, based on combined scores of each apparatus, advanced to the final. In the final, each team selected three gymnasts to compete on each apparatus. All scores on each apparatus were summed to give a final team score. The scores in qualification do not count in the final.

== Qualified teams ==
- Brazil
- China
- Great Britain
- Germany
- Japan
- Russia
- Ukraine
- United States

== Final ==
Team	Floor (gymnastics)		Pommel horse		Rings (gymnastics)		Vault (gymnastics)		Parallel bars		Horizontal bar		Total (AA)	
Team	Score	Rank	Score	Rank	Score	Rank	Score	Rank	Score	Rank	Score	Rank	Score	Rank
Japan	47.199	1	43.933	4	44.599	3	46.199	1	46.766	2	45.398	1	274.094	1st place, gold medalist(s)
Kōhei Uchimura (JPN)	15.600	2	15.100	5	14.800	13	15.566	3	15.366	12	15.166	4		
Ryōhei Katō (JPN)	15.466	3	14.933	8			15.000	17	15.500	9	15.066	8		
Yūsuke Tanaka (JPN)					14.933	7			15.900	2	15.166	4		
Kenzō Shirai (JPN)	16.133	1					15.633	1						
Koji Yamamuro (JPN)			13.900	21	14.866	8								
Russia	44.766	3	45.299	2	45.432	1	46.033	2	46.033	4	43.890	6	271.453	2nd place, silver medalist(s)
David Belyavskiy (RUS)	14.666	13	15.500	3			15.033	14	15.800	5	14.958	11		
Nikolai Kuksenkov (RUS)			15.033	6	14.866	8			15.133	13	14.166	20		
Denis Ablyazin (RUS)	15.100	8			15.700	2	15.600	2						
Nikita Nagornyy (RUS)	15.000	10			14.866	8	15.400	5						
Ivan Stretovich (RUS)			14.766	12					15.100	16	14.766	14		
China	43.799	4	44.258	3	45.233	2	45.000	6	47.866	1	44.966	3	271.122	3rd place, bronze medalist(s)
Deng Shudi (CHN)	13.833	20	14.958	7	14.600	16	15.200	10	15.800	5	14.400	17		
Lin Chaopan (CHN)	14.833	12	14.900	9			14.400	23	15.900	2	15.000	9		
Zhang Chenglong (CHN)	15.133	6					15.400	5			15.566	3		
You Hao (CHN)			14.400	16	14.800	13			16.166	1				
Liu Yang (CHN)					15.833	1								
Great Britain	45.099	2	45.623	1	44.066	6	45.399	4	44.566	6	44.999	2	269.752	4
Max Whitlock (GBR)	15.400	4	15.991	1	14.500	17	14.966	18	14.500	22	14.500	16		
Nile Wilson (GBR)	14.666	13			15.100	5			15.133	13	15.666	1		
Brinn Bevan (GBR)			14.866	10	14.466	18	15.033	14	14.933	18				
Kristian Thomas (GBR)	15.033	9					15.400	5			14.833	13		
Louis Smith (GBR)			14.766	11										
United States	43.757	5	43.699	5	44.465	4	45.865	3	46.333	3	44.441	5	268.560	5
Sam Mikulak (USA)	14.866	11	14.733	13			15.366	8	15.700	7	15.000	9		
Alexander Naddour (USA)	13.566	21	14.633	14	14.966	6	15.033	14						
Jacob Dalton (USA)	15.325	5			14.833	12	15.466	4						
Chris Brooks (USA)					14.666	15			15.100	16	15.108	7		
Danell Leyva (USA)			14.333	19					15.533	8	14.333	19		
Brazil	41.733	7	43.433	7	44.332	5	45.032	5	44.533	6	44.665	4	263.728	6
Sérgio Sasaki (BRA)	12.100	23	14.633	14	14.366	20	15.133	11	15.133	13	14.566	15		
Arthur Mariano (BRA)	14.500	18	14.400	16			15.066	12	14.700	19	14.933	12		
Francisco Barretto Júnior (BRA)			14.400	16	14.100	21			14.700	19	15.166	4		
Diego Hypólito (BRA)	15.133	6					14.833	19						
Arthur Zanetti (BRA)					15.566	3								
Germany	43.352	6	40.948	8	43.132	7	44.540	7	45.391	7	43.732	7	261.275	7
Marcel Nguyen (GER)	14.333	19	13.366	23	14.866	8	14.666	21	15.466	11	14.400	17		
Andreas Bretschneider (GER)	14.533	17	13.516	22	14.466	18			14.425	23	13.666	22		
Lukas Dauser (GER)			14.066	20	13.800	23	14.783	20	15.500	9				
Fabian Hambüchen (GER)	14.666	13					15.091	13			15.666	1		
Andreas Toba (GER)														
Ukraine	27.766	8	43.632	6	29.299	8	44.015	8	30.366	8	27.000	8	202.078	8
Vladyslav Hryko (UKR)	13.166	22	12.666	24	13.866	22	14.241	24	14.666	21	13.700	21		
Igor Radivilov (UKR)	14.600	16			15.433	4	15.333	9			13.300	23		
Oleg Verniaiev (UKR)			15.633	2					15.900	2				
Andriy Sienichkin (UKR)			15.333	4			14.441	22						
Maksym Semiankiv (UKR)	DNS^{1}	24			DNS^{1}	24					DNS^{1}	24		

1. Due to injury, Maksym Semiankiv did not score on any of his scheduled events, simply just touching the equipment.

1. Official Results for the Artistic Gymnastics Men's Team Final.
