= Takeshi Katō (gymnast) =

Japanese artistic gymnast

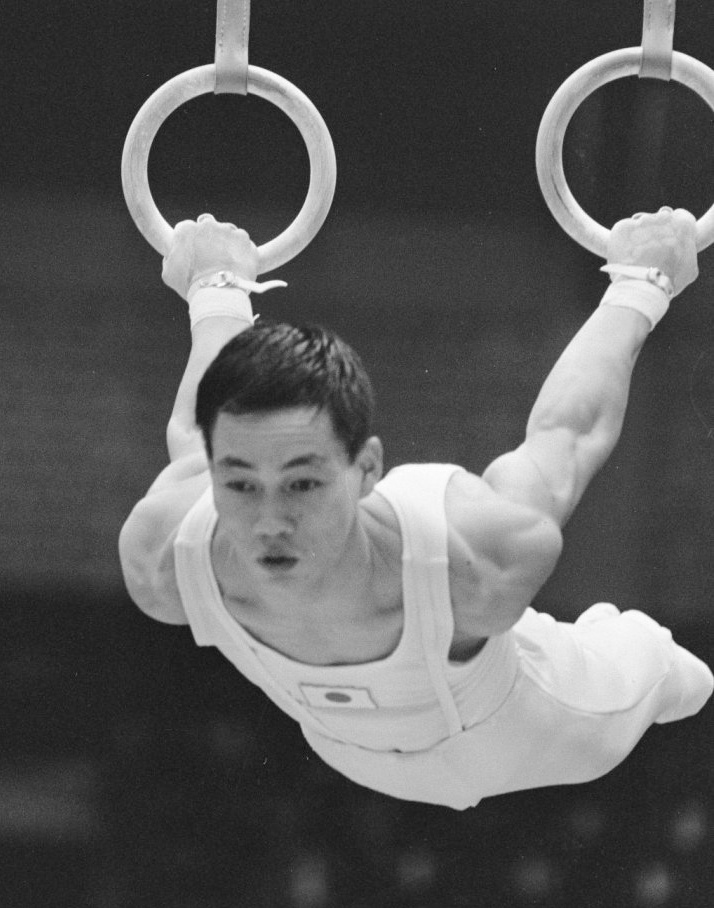
- Katō in 1966

Personal information
- Born: September 25, 1942 Aichi, Japan
- Died: 24 July 1982 (aged 39) Tokyo, Japan
- Height: 1.63 m (5 ft 4 in)

Gymnastics career
- Discipline: Men's artistic gymnastics
- Country represented: Japan
Medal record
Olympic Games
Gold medal – first place	1968 Mexico City	Team
Bronze medal – third place	1968 Mexico City	Floor exercise
World Championships
Gold medal – first place	1966 Dortmund	Team
Gold medal – first place	1970 Ljubljana	Team
Silver medal – second place	1966 Dortmund	Vault
Bronze medal – third place	1966 Dortmund	Pommel horse
Bronze medal – third place	1970 Ljubljana	Floor
Bronze medal – third place	1970 Ljubljana	Vault

Takeshi Katō (加藤 武司, Katō Takeshi; September 25, 1942 – July 24, 1982) was a Japanese gymnast and Olympic champion.

== Olympics ==
Katō competed at the 1968 Summer Olympics in Mexico City, Mexico, where he received a gold medal in team combined exercises, and a bronze medal in floor exercise.

== World championships ==
Katō received a silver medal in vault, and a bronze medal in pommel horse at the 1966 World Artistic Gymnastics Championships, and Japan won the team competition.

He received bronze medals in vault and floor exercise at the 1970 World Artistic Gymnastics Championships, and Japan again won the team competition.

His brother Sawao Katō was also a multiple Olympic medalist in artistic gymnastics.

== Death ==
Takeshi Katō died of cancer on July 24, 1982 in Tokyo.
