= Kazuhito Tanaka =

Japanese artistic gymnast

- Full name: Kazuhito Tanaka
- Born: May 16, 1985 (age 41) Wakayama, Japan
- Height: 166 cm (5 ft 5 in)

Gymnastics career
- Discipline: Men's artistic gymnastics
- Country represented: Japan
Medal record
Olympic Games
Silver medal – second place	2012 London	Team
World Championships
Silver medal – second place	2010 Rotterdam	Team
Silver medal – second place	2011 Tokyo	Team
Bronze medal – third place	2009 London	Parallel Bars

Kazuhito Tanaka (田中 和仁, Tanaka Kazuhito; born 16 May 1985) is a Japanese gymnast, Olympic silver and 3-time World medalist. (Note: "Kazuhito Tanaka". London 2012. The London Organising Committee of the Olympic Games and Paralympic Games Limited.) Younger siblings, sister Rie Tanaka and brother Yusuke Tanaka, are both professional gymnasts.

Tanaka's first major international competition was the 2009 World Championships, where he qualified 10th to the individual all-around with a score of 86.650. In the final, he placed fourth with a score of 88.300, a tenth of a point behind third place. He won the bronze medal in the parallel bars final, scoring 15.500. Tanaka competed for the Japanese team which won the silver medal in the team-all around competition at the 2010 World Championships, contributing scores of 14.166 on still rings, 15.483 on parallel bars, and 14.433 on high bar. His team matched this feat the next year at the 2011 World Championships, where he contributed scores of 15.500 on parallel bars and 15.141 on high bar. He also qualified seventh to the parallel bars final, and placed eight with a score of 15.166.

At the 2012 Olympic Games, he competed on all six apparatuses during qualification, where he qualified in twenty-second place to the individual all-around final with a total score of 86.841, was named as the third reserve for the rings final with a score of 15.100, and qualified second to the parallel bars final with a score of 15.725, .141 behind his brother Yusuke. During the team final 2012 Olympics, he contributed scores of 13.733 on floor, 13.433 on pommel horse, 15.366 on parallel bars, and 15.166 on high bar towards the Japanese team's second-place finish. In the individual all-around, Tanaka was in the silver medal position going into the final rotation, when a mistake on the pommel horse dropped him to sixth. His overall score was 89.407, a major improvement from his performance in qualification, and just over a point away from medalling. In the parallel bars final, he once again just missed out on a medal, placing fourth with a score of 15.500.
