= Haruhiro Yamashita =

Japanese gymnast (1938–2026)

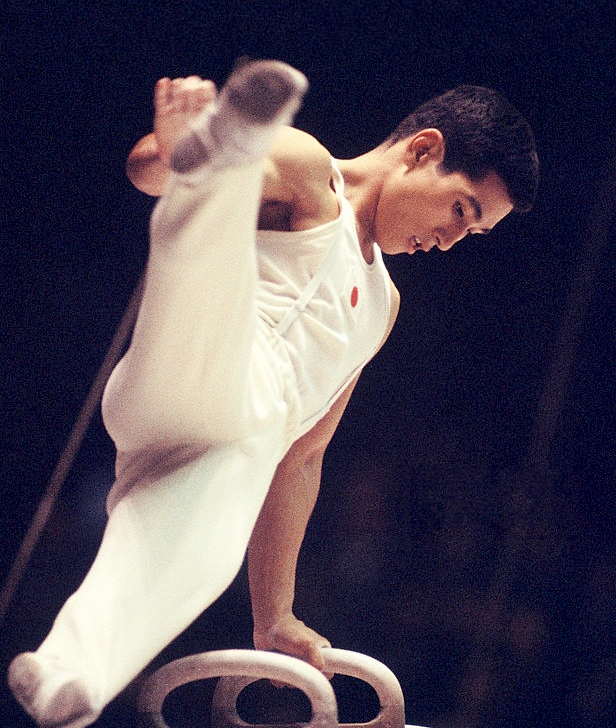
- Yamashita at the 1964 Olympics

Personal information
- Born: November 11, 1938 Uwajima, Ehime, Japan
- Died: June 19, 2026 (aged 87)
- Height: 1.65 m (5 ft 5 in)

Gymnastics career
- Discipline: Men's artistic gymnastics
- Country represented: Japan
Medal record
Olympic Games
Gold medal – first place	1964 Tokyo	Team
Gold medal – first place	1964 Tokyo	Vault
World Championships
Gold medal – first place	1962 Prague	Team
Gold medal – first place	1966 Dortmund	Team
Gold medal – first place	1966 Dortmund	Vault
Silver medal – second place	1962 Prague	Vault

Haruhiro Yamashita (山下 治広, Yamashita Haruhiro; November 11, 1938 – June 19, 2026) was a Japanese gymnast, who competed in the 1964 Summer Olympics. He won two gold medals, in the vault and team combined exercises.

After marriage he changed his last name from Yamashita to Matsuda (松田), adopting his aunt's surname, who took care of him as a child. In 1961, he graduated from Nippon Sport Science University, where in 1983 he became professor and later professor emeritus. In the early 1970s he was an assistant gymnastics coach under Roger Council at the Indiana State University. There he began his research on biorhythms.

Yamashita also trained the national gymnastics team, at the 1976 Summer Olympics and at the Asian Games in 1990, and held senior positions with the Japan Gymnastics Association.

In 2000 Yamashita was inducted into the International Gymnastics Hall of Fame. He was an honorary citizen of his native town of Uwajima.

Yamashita died on June 19, 2026, at the age of 87.
