= Gymnastics at the 2020 Summer Olympics – Men's pommel horse =

Olympic gymnastics event

Men's pommel horse at the Games of the XXXII Olympiad
- Olympic artistic gymnastics
- Venue: Ariake Gymnastics Centre
- Date: 24 July 2021 (qualifying); 1 August 2021 (final)
- Competitors: 8 from 7 nations
- Winning score: 15.583 points

Medalists
| 1st place, gold medalist(s) | | Max Whitlock | Great Britain |
| 2nd place, silver medalist(s) | | Lee Chih-kai | Chinese Taipei |
| 3rd place, bronze medalist(s) | | Kazuma Kaya | Japan |

Official Video Highlights

The men's pommel horse event at the 2020 Summer Olympics was held on 24 July and 1 August 2021 at the Ariake Gymnastics Centre. Approximately 70 gymnasts from 35 nations (of the 98 total gymnasts) competed on pommel horse in the qualifying round.

Defending champion Max Whitlock of Great Britain repeated as Olympic champion to win his third Olympic title and sixth Olympic medal overall. Chinese Taipei's Lee Chih-kai won silver to earn Chinese Taipei's first Olympic medal in artistic gymnastics. Kazuma Kaya of Japan completed the podium with bronze, moving up from seventh in qualifications.

== Background ==
This was the 25th appearance of the event, which is one of the five apparatus events held every time there were apparatus events at the Summer Olympics (no apparatus events were held in 1900, 1908, 1912, or 1920).

== Qualification ==
A National Olympic Committee (NOC) could enter up to 6 qualified gymnasts: a team of 4 and up to 2 specialists. A total of 98 quota places are allocated to men's gymnastics.

The 12 teams that qualify will be able to send 4 gymnasts in the team competition, for a total of 48 of the 98 quota places. The top three teams at the 2018 World Artistic Gymnastics Championships (China, Russia, and Japan) and the top nine teams (excluding those already qualified) at the 2019 World Artistic Gymnastics Championships (Ukraine, Great Britain, Switzerland, the United States, Chinese Taipei, South Korea, Brazil, Spain, and Germany) earned team qualification places.

The remaining 50 quota places are awarded individually. Each gymnast can only earn one place, except that gymnasts that competed with a team that qualified are eligible to earn a second place through the 2020 All Around World Cup Series. Some of the individual events are open to gymnasts from NOCs with qualified teams, while others are not. These places are filled through various criteria based on the 2019 World Championships, the 2020 FIG Artistic Gymnastics World Cup series, continental championships, a host guarantee, and a Tripartite Commission invitation.

Each of the 98 qualified gymnasts are eligible for the pommel horse competition, but many gymnasts do not compete in each of the apparatus events.

The COVID-19 pandemic delayed many of the events for qualifying for gymnastics. The 2018 and 2019 World Championships were completed on time, but many of the World Cup series events were delayed into 2021.

== Competition format ==
The top 8 qualifiers in the qualification phase (limit two per NOC) advanced to the apparatus final. The finalists performed an additional exercise. Qualification scores were then ignored, with only final round scores counting.

== Schedule ==
The competition was held over two days, 24 July and 1 August. The qualifying round (for all men's gymnastics events) was the first day with the apparatus final on the second day.

| Date | Time | Round | Subdivision |
|---|---|---|---|
| 24 July | 10:00 | Qualification | Subdivision 1 |
| 24 July | 14:30 | Qualification | Subdivision 2 |
| 24 July | 19:30 | Qualification | Subdivision 3 |
| 1 August | 18:41 | Final | – |
All times are local time (UTC+09:00).

== Results ==
=== Qualifying ===
| Rank | Gymnast | D Score | E Score | Pen. | Total | Qual. |
|---|---|---|---|---|---|---|
| 1 (Note: The top three on pommel horse all had a total score of 15.266 points, but in accordance with the FIG's tie-breaking criteria, Lee Chih-kai was placed first due to his E-score (8.866) being higher than that of the other two gymnasts, Rhys McClenaghan and Kohei Kameyama (8.766). McClenaghan and Kameyama had identical D-scores of 6.5, and were thus tied in second place.) | Lee Chih-kai (TPE) | 6.4 | 8.866 | | 15.266 | Q |
| 2 | Rhys McClenaghan (IRL) | 6.5 | 8.766 | | 15.266 | Q |
| 2 | Kohei Kameyama (JPN) | 6.5 | 8.766 | | 15.266 | Q |
| 4 | Alec Yoder (USA) | 6.4 | 8.800 | | 15.200 | Q |
| 5 | Max Whitlock (GBR) | 6.8 | 8.100 | | 14.900 | Q |
| 6 | Sun Wei (CHN) | 6.3 | 8.533 | | 14.833 | Q |
| 7 | Kazuma Kaya (JPN) | 6.4 | 8.433 | | 14.833 | Q |
| 8 | Daiki Hashimoto (JPN) | 6.5 | 8.266 | | 14.766 | – |
| 9 | David Belyavskiy (ROC) | 6.4 | 8.333 | | 14.733 | Q |
| 10 | Matvei Petrov (ALB) | 6.5 | 8.233 | | 14.733 | R1 |
| 11 | Joe Fraser (GBR) | 6.3 | 8.366 | | 14.666 | R2 |
| 12 | Zou Jingyuan (CHN) | 5.9 | 8.700 | | 14.600 | R3 |

Reserves

The reserves for the men's pommel horse final were:

1. Matvei Petrov (ALB)
2. Joe Fraser (GBR)
3. Zou Jingyuan (CHN)

Only two gymnasts from each country may advance to the event final. Gymnasts who did not qualify for the final because of the quota, but had high enough scores to do so were:

- Daiki Hashimoto (JPN)

=== Final ===
| Rank | Gymnast | D Score | E Score | Pen. | Total |
|---|---|---|---|---|---|
| 1st place, gold medalist(s) | Max Whitlock (GBR) | 7.0 | 8.583 | | 15.583 |
| 2nd place, silver medalist(s) | Lee Chih-kai (TPE) | 6.7 | 8.700 | | 15.400 |
| 3rd place, bronze medalist(s) | Kazuma Kaya (JPN) | 6.6 | 8.300 | | 14.900 |
| 4 | David Belyavskiy (ROC) | 6.4 | 8.433 | | 14.833 |
| 5 | Kohei Kameyama (JPN) | 6.8 | 7.800 | | 14.600 |
| 6 | Alec Yoder (USA) | 6.4 | 8.166 | | 14.566 |
| 7 | Rhys McClenaghan (IRL) | 6.4 | 6.700 | | 13.100 |
| 8 | Sun Wei (CHN) | 6.3 | 6.766 | | 13.066 |
