= Kazue Hanyu =

Japanese gymnast (born 1950)

Personal information
- Nationality: Japanese
- Born: 8 September 1950 (age 74); Fukui, Japan

Sport
- Sport: Gymnastics

Kazue Hanyu (羽生 和永, Hanyū Kazue; born 8 September 1950) is a Japanese gymnast. She competed at the 1968 Summer Olympics and the 1972 Summer Olympics.
