= Yutaka Aihara =

Japanese gymnast (born 1970)

- Born: 18 December 1970 (age 55) Takasaki, Gunma, Japan
- Height: 156 cm (5 ft 1 in)

Gymnastics career
- Discipline: Men's artistic gymnastics
- Country represented: Japan
Medal record
Representing Japan
Olympic Games
Bronze medal – third place	1992 Barcelona	Team
World Championships
Bronze medal – third place	1991 Indianapolis	Vault
Asian Games
Silver medal – second place	1990 Beijing	Team

Yutaka Aihara (相原 豊, Aihara Yutaka; born 18 December 1970) is a Japanese former gymnast who competed in the 1992 Summer Olympics, winning a bronze medal in the team event. At the 1991 World Championships, he won a bronze medal on the vault.

== Early life ==
Aihara was born on 18 December 1970 in Takasaki, Gunma. His father, Nobuyuki Aihara, won two gold medals at the 1960 Summer Olympics, and his mother, Toshiko Shirasu-Aihara, won a bronze medal at the 1964 Summer Olympics. He has an older brother named Makoto who also competed in gymnastics.

== Gymnastics career ==
Aihara placed fifth in the all-around at the 1990 American Cup, and he won a silver medal in the team competition at the 1990 Asian Games. He won three medals at the 1991 Summer Universiade– silver with the team, silver on the floor exercise, and bronze on the parallel bars. He was part of the Japanese team that placed fourth at the 1991 World Championships. There, he advanced into the vault final and won a bronze medal with a score of 9.631, behind Yoo Ok-ryul and Vitaly Scherbo.

Aihara was selected to represent Japan at the 1992 Summer Olympics, where he helped Japan win the team bronze medal, behind the Unified Team and China. Individually, he advanced into the floor exercise final and placed fifth with a score of 9.737. He also advanced into the vault final, placing eighth.

In January 1993, Aihara severely injured his right shoulder in a motorcycle accident, leading to his retirement from the sport. As of 2022, he is the head coach of the Aihara Gymnastics Club, which was founded by his father.
