= Yukio Iketani =

Japanese artistic gymnast

- Born: September 26, 1970 (age 55)

Gymnastics career
- Discipline: Men's artistic gymnastics
- Country represented: Japan
Medal record
Representing Japan
Olympic Games
Silver medal – second place	1992 Barcelona	Floor exercise
Bronze medal – third place	1988 Seoul	Floor exercise
Bronze medal – third place	1988 Seoul	Team
Bronze medal – third place	1992 Barcelona	Team
World Championships
Bronze medal – third place	1989 Stuttgart	Horizontal bar
Asian Games
Silver medal – second place	1990 Beijing	Team
Silver medal – second place	1990 Beijing	Horizontal Bar

Yukio Iketani (池谷 幸雄, Iketani Yukio; born September 26, 1970) is a Japanese gymnast and Olympic medalist.

== Sports career ==
Iketani received a bronze medal in floor exercise and in team all-around 1988 Summer Olympics in Seoul. He received a silver medal in floor exercise and a bronze medal in team all-around 1992 Summer Olympics in Barcelona.

Iketani received a bronze medal in horizontal bar at the 1989 World Artistic Gymnastics Championships in Stuttgart.

== Public appearances ==
Yukio participated in Kinniku Banzuke and won the event "Hand walk". He participated in four Sasuke tournaments. He cleared the first stage but went out on the second stage in the first tournament. He returned to participate in the 20th tournament but went out on the Log Grip in the first stage. Iketani participated in Sasuke 24 and failed the log grip again. He was then invited in Sasuke 25 where he was able to clear the Rolling Log and the Jump Hang but suddenly was taken out by the Bridge Jump. His brother is Sasuke veteran Naoki, who made 15 tournament appearances and has gone as far as the Pipe Slider on the third stage.

Iketani has a brief professional wrestling career in Hustle, where he was known for the ring name Ginga Iketani. He wrestled three times for them between 2007 and 2008, teaming with the face stable Hustle Army.

He represented Democratic Party as a proportional candidate in the Summer 2010 House of Councillors election but lost.
