= China at the World Artistic Gymnastics Championships =

- Flag of China
- IOC code: CHN
- Medals: Gold 98 Silver 63 Bronze 53 Total 214

China first competed at the 1958 World Championships. They stopped competing after the 1962 World Championships due to the International Gymnastics Federation accepting Taiwan as a member nation. They returned in 1979 where Ma Yanhong won China's first gold medal. The Chinese women originally won the bronze medal in the team event at the 1999 World Championships; however their medal was stripped in 2010 after it was discovered that Dong Fangxiao's age was falsified at the time of the competition.

== Medalists ==
Medal	Name	Year	Event
Bronze	Yu Lifeng	(Czechoslovakia) 1962 Prague	Men's pommel horse
Gold	Ma Yanhong	(United States) 1979 Fort Worth	Women's uneven bars
Bronze	Tong Fei, Li Ning, Li Xiaoping, Huang Yubin, Peng Yaping, Li Yuejiu	(Soviet Union) 1981 Moscow	Men's team
Silver	Ma Yanhong, Chen Yongyan, Zhu Zheng, Wu Jiani, Wen Jia, Li Cuiling	(Soviet Union) 1981 Moscow	Women's team
Gold	Li Yuejiu	(Soviet Union) 1981 Moscow	Men's floor exercise
Gold	Li Xiaoping	(Soviet Union) 1981 Moscow	Men's pommel horse
Silver	Ma Yanhong	(Soviet Union) 1981 Moscow	Women's uneven bars
Silver	Huang Yubin	(Soviet Union) 1981 Moscow	Men's rings
Silver	Chen Yongyan	(Soviet Union) 1981 Moscow	Women's balance beam
Bronze	Wu Jiani	(Soviet Union) 1981 Moscow	Women's balance beam
Gold	Tong Fei, Li Ning, Lou Yun, Xu Zhiqiang, Li Xiaoping, Li Yuejiu	(Hungary) 1983 Budapest	Men's team
Bronze	Lou Yun	(Hungary) 1983 Budapest	Men's all-around
Gold	Tong Fei	(Hungary) 1983 Budapest	Men's floor exercise
Bronze	Li Ning	(Hungary) 1983 Budapest	Men's floor exercise
Silver	Li Xiaoping	(Hungary) 1983 Budapest	Men's pommel horse
Bronze	Li Ning	(Hungary) 1983 Budapest	Men's rings
Silver	Li Ning	(Hungary) 1983 Budapest	Men's vault
Gold	Lou Yun	(Hungary) 1983 Budapest	Men's parallel bars
Bronze	Tong Fei	(Hungary) 1983 Budapest	Men's parallel bars
Silver	Li Ning, Xu Zhiqiang, Tong Fei, Lou Yun, Yang Yueshan, Zou Limin	(Canada) 1985 Montreal	Men's team
Gold	Tong Fei	(Canada) 1985 Montreal	Men's floor exercise
Bronze	Li Ning	(Canada) 1985 Montreal	Men's floor exercise
Silver	Li Ning	(Canada) 1985 Montreal	Men's pommel horse
Gold	Li Ning	(Canada) 1985 Montreal	Men's rings
Silver	Lou Yun	(Canada) 1985 Montreal	Men's vault
Gold	Tong Fei	(Canada) 1985 Montreal	Men's horizontal bar
Silver	Xu Zhiqiang, Lou Yun, Wang Chongsheng, Guo Linxiang, Li Chunyang, Li Ning	(Netherlands) 1987 Rotterdam	Men's team
Gold	Lou Yun	(Netherlands) 1987 Rotterdam	Men's floor exercise
Silver	Li Ning	(Netherlands) 1987 Rotterdam	Men's rings
Gold	Lou Yun	(Netherlands) 1987 Rotterdam	Men's vault
Bronze	Li Chunyang, Li Jing, Ma Zheng, Li Ge, Guo Linxiang, Wang Chongsheng	(Germany) 1989 Stuttgart	Men's team
Bronze	Yang Bo, Chen Cuiting, Fan Di, Li Yan, Wang Wenjing, Ma Ying	(Germany) 1989 Stuttgart	Women's team
Bronze	Li Jing	(Germany) 1989 Stuttgart	Men's all-around
Bronze	Li Chunyang	(Germany) 1989 Stuttgart	Men's floor exercise
Bronze	Li Jing	(Germany) 1989 Stuttgart	Men's pommel horse
Gold	Fan Di	(Germany) 1989 Stuttgart	Women's uneven bars
Gold	Li Jing	(Germany) 1989 Stuttgart	Men's parallel bars
Gold	Li Chunyang	(Germany) 1989 Stuttgart	Men's horizontal bar
Silver	Li Jing, Li Chunyang, Huang Huadong, Guo Linyao, Li Xiaoshuang, Li Ge	(United States) 1991 Indianapolis	Men's team
Silver	Guo Linyao	(United States) 1991 Indianapolis	Men's pommel horse
Bronze	Li Jing	(United States) 1991 Indianapolis	Men's pommel horse
Gold	Li Jing	(United States) 1991 Indianapolis	Men's parallel bars
Bronze	Guo Linyao	(United States) 1991 Indianapolis	Men's parallel bars
Gold	Li Chunyang	(United States) 1991 Indianapolis	Men's horizontal bar
Gold	Li Jing	(France) 1992 Paris	Men's pommel horse
Silver	Li Yifang	(France) 1992 Paris	Women's balance beam
Gold	Li Jing	(France) 1992 Paris	Men's parallel bars
Silver	Li Jing	(France) 1992 Paris	Men's horizontal bar
Gold	Fan Hongbin, Guo Linyao, Huang Huadong, Huang Liping, Li Dashuang, Li Xiaoshuang, Li Jing	(Germany) 1994 Dortmund	Men's team
Gold	Luo Li	(Australia) 1994 Brisbane	Women's uneven bars
Silver	Li Xiaoshuang	(Australia) 1994 Brisbane	Men's vault
Gold	Huang Liping	(Australia) 1994 Brisbane	Men's parallel bars
Gold	Fan Bin, Huang Huadong, Huang Liping, Li Xiaoshuang, Zhang Jinjing, Shen Jian, Fan Hongbin	(Japan) 1995 Sabae	Men's team
Silver	Mo Huilan, Mao Yanling, Meng Fei, Qiao Ya, Liu Xuan, Ye Linlin, Ji Liya	(Japan) 1995 Sabae	Women's team
Gold	Li Xiaoshuang	(Japan) 1995 Sabae	Men's all-around
Silver	Li Xiaoshuang	(Japan) 1995 Sabae	Men's floor exercise
Silver	Huang Huadong	(Japan) 1995 Sabae	Men's pommel horse
Silver	Mo Huilan	(Japan) 1995 Sabae	Women's uneven bars
Gold	Mo Huilan	(Japan) 1995 Sabae	Women's balance beam
Silver	Huang Liping	(Japan) 1995 Sabae	Men's parallel bars
Silver	Ji Liya	(Japan) 1995 Sabae	Women's floor exercise
Bronze	Zhang Jinjing	(Japan) 1995 Sabae	Men's horizontal bar
Bronze	Liu Xuan	(Puerto Rico) 1996 San Juan	Women's balance beam
Gold	Kui Yuanyuan	(Puerto Rico) 1996 San Juan	Women's floor exercise
Gold	Shen Jian, Li Xiaopeng, Huang Xu, Lu Yufu, Xiao Junfeng, Zhang Jinjing	(Switzerland) 1997 Lausanne	Men's team
Bronze	Liu Xuan, Kui Yuanyuan, Meng Fei, Bi Wenjing, Mo Huilan, Zhou Duan	(Switzerland) 1997 Lausanne	Women's team
Bronze	Li Xiaopeng	(Switzerland) 1997 Lausanne	Men's floor exercise
Silver	Zhou Duan	(Switzerland) 1997 Lausanne	Women's vault
Silver	Meng Fei	(Switzerland) 1997 Lausanne	Women's uneven bars
Bronze	Bi Wenjing	(Switzerland) 1997 Lausanne	Women's uneven bars
Bronze	Kui Yuanyuan	(Switzerland) 1997 Lausanne	Women's balance beam
Gold	Zhang Jinjing	(Switzerland) 1997 Lausanne	Men's parallel bars
Silver	Li Xiaopeng	(Switzerland) 1997 Lausanne	Men's parallel bars
Gold	Dong Zhen, Huang Xu, Li Xiaopeng, Lu Yufu, Xing Aowei, Yang Wei	(China) 1999 Tianjin	Men's team
Bronze	Xing Aowei	(China) 1999 Tianjin	Men's floor exercise
Silver	Huang Mandan	(China) 1999 Tianjin	Women's uneven bars
Bronze	Ling Jie	(China) 1999 Tianjin	Women's uneven bars
Gold	Dong Zhen	(China) 1999 Tianjin	Men's rings
Gold	Li Xiaopeng	(China) 1999 Tianjin	Men's vault
Gold	Ling Jie	(China) 1999 Tianjin	Women's balance beam
Bronze	Yang Wei	(China) 1999 Tianjin	Men's horizontal bar
Gold	Feng Jing	(Belgium) 2001 Ghent	Men's all-around
Silver	Xiao Qin	(Belgium) 2001 Ghent	Men's pommel horse
Bronze	Sun Xiaojiao	(Belgium) 2001 Ghent	Women's balance beam
Silver	Xiao Qin	(Hungary) 2002 Debrecen	Men's pommel horse
Gold	Li Xiaopeng	(Hungary) 2002 Debrecen	Men's vault
Bronze	Yang Wei	(Hungary) 2002 Debrecen	Men's vault
Gold	Li Xiaopeng	(Hungary) 2002 Debrecen	Men's parallel bars
Gold	Huang Xu, Li Xiaopeng, Teng Haibin, Xiao Qin, Xing Aowei, Yang Wei	(United States) 2003 Anaheim	Men's team
Silver	Yang Wei	(United States) 2003 Anaheim	Men's all-around
Bronze	Zhang Nan	(United States) 2003 Anaheim	Women's all-around
Gold	Teng Haibin	(United States) 2003 Anaheim	Men's pommel horse
Gold	Li Xiaopeng	(United States) 2003 Anaheim	Men's vault
Gold	Fan Ye	(United States) 2003 Anaheim	Women's balance beam
Gold	Li Xiaopeng	(United States) 2003 Anaheim	Men's parallel bars
Silver	Huang Xu	(United States) 2003 Anaheim	Men's parallel bars
Bronze	Liang Fuliang	(Australia) 2005 Melbourne	Men's floor exercise
Gold	Cheng Fei	(Australia) 2005 Melbourne	Women's vault
Gold	Xiao Qin	(Australia) 2005 Melbourne	Men's pommel horse
Silver	Li Xiaopeng	(Australia) 2005 Melbourne	Men's parallel bars
Gold	Chen Yibing, Feng Jing, Liang Fuliang, Xiao Qin, Yang Wei, Zou Kai	(Denmark) 2006 Aarhus	Men's team
Gold	Zhou Zhuoru, Zhang Nan, Cheng Fei, Pang Panpan, He Ning, Li Ya	(Denmark) 2006 Aarhus	Women's team
Gold	Yang Wei	(Denmark) 2006 Aarhus	Men's all-around
Gold	Cheng Fei	(Denmark) 2006 Aarhus	Women's vault
Gold	Xiao Qin	(Denmark) 2006 Aarhus	Men's pommel horse
Gold	Chen Yibing	(Denmark) 2006 Aarhus	Men's rings
Gold	Yang Wei	(Denmark) 2006 Aarhus	Men's parallel bars
Gold	Cheng Fei	(Denmark) 2006 Aarhus	Women's floor exercise
Gold	Chen Yibing, Huang Xu, Liang Fuliang, Xiao Qin, Yang Wei, Zou Kai	(Germany) 2007 Stuttgart	Men's team
Silver	Cheng Fei, Jiang Yuyuan, Yang Yilin, Li Shanshan, Xiao Sha, He Ning	(Germany) 2007 Stuttgart	Women's team
Gold	Yang Wei	(Germany) 2007 Stuttgart	Men's all-around
Gold	Cheng Fei	(Germany) 2007 Stuttgart	Women's vault
Gold	Xiao Qin	(Germany) 2007 Stuttgart	Men's pommel horse
Bronze	Yang Yilin	(Germany) 2007 Stuttgart	Women's uneven bars
Gold	Chen Yibing	(Germany) 2007 Stuttgart	Men's rings
Silver	Li Shanshan	(Germany) 2007 Stuttgart	Women's balance beam
Silver	Zou Kai	(United Kingdom) 2009 London	Men's floor exercise
Gold	Zhang Hongtao	(United Kingdom) 2009 London	Men's pommel horse
Gold	He Kexin	(United Kingdom) 2009 London	Women's uneven bars
Gold	Yan Mingyong	(United Kingdom) 2009 London	Men's rings
Gold	Deng Linlin	(United Kingdom) 2009 London	Women's balance beam
Gold	Wang Guanyin	(United Kingdom) 2009 London	Men's parallel bars
Silver	Feng Zhe	(United Kingdom) 2009 London	Men's parallel bars
Bronze	Sui Lu	(United Kingdom) 2009 London	Women's floor exercise
Gold	Zou Kai	(United Kingdom) 2009 London	Men's horizontal bar
Gold	Chen Yibing, Feng Zhe, Teng Haibin, Yan Mingyong, Lü Bo, Zhang Chenglong	(Netherlands) 2010 Rotterdam	Men's team
Bronze	Jiang Yuyuan, He Kexin, Sui Lu, Huang Qiushuang, Deng Linlin, Yang Yilin	(Netherlands) 2010 Rotterdam	Women's team
Silver	Jiang Yuyuan	(Netherlands) 2010 Rotterdam	Women's all-around
Gold	Chen Yibing	(Netherlands) 2010 Rotterdam	Men's rings
Silver	Yan Mingyong	(Netherlands) 2010 Rotterdam	Men's rings
Silver	Deng Linlin	(Netherlands) 2010 Rotterdam	Women's balance beam
Gold	Feng Zhe	(Netherlands) 2010 Rotterdam	Men's parallel bars
Silver	Teng Haibin	(Netherlands) 2010 Rotterdam	Men's parallel bars
Gold	Zhang Chenglong	(Netherlands) 2010 Rotterdam	Men's horizontal bar
Gold	Zou Kai, Teng Haibin, Chen Yibing, Zhang Chenglong, Feng Zhe, Yan Mingyong	(Japan) 2011 Tokyo	Men's team
Bronze	Huang Qiushuang, Yao Jinnan, Tan Sixin, Sui Lu, Jiang Yuyuan, He Kexin	(Japan) 2011 Tokyo	Women's team
Bronze	Yao Jinnan	(Japan) 2011 Tokyo	Women's all-around
Silver	Zou Kai	(Japan) 2011 Tokyo	Men's floor exercise
Bronze	Huang Qiushuang	(Japan) 2011 Tokyo	Women's uneven bars
Gold	Chen Yibing	(Japan) 2011 Tokyo	Men's rings
Gold	Sui Lu	(Japan) 2011 Tokyo	Women's balance beam
Silver	Yao Jinnan	(Japan) 2011 Tokyo	Women's balance beam
Silver	Zhang Chenglong	(Japan) 2011 Tokyo	Men's parallel bars
Silver	Sui Lu	(Japan) 2011 Tokyo	Women's floor exercise
Gold	Zou Kai	(Japan) 2011 Tokyo	Men's horizontal bar
Silver	Zhang Chenglong	(Japan) 2011 Tokyo	Men's horizontal bar
Gold	Huang Huidan	(Belgium) 2013 Antwerp	Women's uneven bars
Gold	Lin Chaopan	(Belgium) 2013 Antwerp	Men's parallel bars
Gold	Cheng Ran, Deng Shudi, Lin Chaopan, Liu Yang, You Hao, Zhang Chenglong, Liu Rongbing	(China) 2014 Nanning	Men's team
Silver	Yao Jinnan, Chen Siyi, Shang Chunsong, Huang Huidan, Bai Yawen, Tan Jiaxin, Xie Yufen	(China) 2014 Nanning	Women's team
Gold	Yao Jinnan	(China) 2014 Nanning	Women's uneven bars
Silver	Huang Huidan	(China) 2014 Nanning	Women's uneven bars
Gold	Liu Yang	(China) 2014 Nanning	Men's rings
Bronze	You Hao	(China) 2014 Nanning	Men's rings
Silver	Bai Yawen	(China) 2014 Nanning	Women's balance beam
Bronze	Deng Shudi, Lin Chaopan, Liu Yang, Xiao Ruoteng, You Hao, Zhang Chenglong, Liu Rongbing	(United Kingdom) 2015 Glasgow	Men's team
Silver	Chen Siyi, Fan Yilin, Mao Yi, Shang Chunsong, Tan Jiaxin, Wang Yan, Zhu Xiaofang	(United Kingdom) 2015 Glasgow	Women's team
Bronze	Deng Shudi	(United Kingdom) 2015 Glasgow	Men's all-around
Gold	Fan Yilin	(United Kingdom) 2015 Glasgow	Women's uneven bars
Silver	You Hao	(United Kingdom) 2015 Glasgow	Men's rings
Bronze	Liu Yang	(United Kingdom) 2015 Glasgow	Men's rings
Gold	You Hao	(United Kingdom) 2015 Glasgow	Men's parallel bars
Bronze	Deng Shudi	(United Kingdom) 2015 Glasgow	Men's parallel bars
Gold	Xiao Ruoteng	(Canada) 2017 Montreal	Men's all-around
Silver	Lin Chaopan	(Canada) 2017 Montreal	Men's all-around
Bronze	Xiao Ruoteng	(Canada) 2017 Montreal	Men's pommel horse
Gold	Fan Yilin	(Canada) 2017 Montreal	Women's uneven bars
Bronze	Liu Yang	(Canada) 2017 Montreal	Men's rings
Gold	Zou Jingyuan	(Canada) 2017 Montreal	Men's parallel bars
Gold	Deng Shudi, Lin Chaopan, Sun Wei, Xiao Ruoteng, Zou Jingyuan, Lan Xingyu	(Qatar) 2018 Doha	Men's team
Bronze	Chen Yile, Liu Jinru, Liu Tingting, Luo Huan, Zhang Jin, Du Siyu	(Qatar) 2018 Doha	Women's team
Silver	Xiao Ruoteng	(Qatar) 2018 Doha	Men's all-around
Gold	Xiao Ruoteng	(Qatar) 2018 Doha	Men's pommel horse
Gold	Liu Tingting	(Qatar) 2018 Doha	Women's balance beam
Gold	Zou Jingyuan	(Qatar) 2018 Doha	Men's parallel bars
Silver	Deng Shudi, Lin Chaopan, Sun Wei, Xiao Ruoteng, Zou Jingyuan, You Hao	(Germany) 2019 Stuttgart	Men's team
Silver	Tang Xijing	(Germany) 2019 Stuttgart	Women's all-around
Bronze	Xiao Ruoteng	(Germany) 2019 Stuttgart	Men's floor exercise
Silver	Liu Tingting	(Germany) 2019 Stuttgart	Women's balance beam
Bronze	Li Shijia	(Germany) 2019 Stuttgart	Women's balance beam
Gold	Zhang Boheng	(Japan) 2021 Kitakyushu	Men's all-around
Silver	Weng Hao	(Japan) 2021 Kitakyushu	Men's pommel horse
Gold	Wei Xiaoyuan	(Japan) 2021 Kitakyushu	Women's uneven bars
Bronze	Luo Rui	(Japan) 2021 Kitakyushu	Women's uneven bars
Gold	Lan Xingyu	(Japan) 2021 Kitakyushu	Men's rings
Gold	Hu Xuwei	(Japan) 2021 Kitakyushu	Men's parallel bars
Bronze	Shi Cong	(Japan) 2021 Kitakyushu	Men's parallel bars
Gold	Hu Xuwei	(Japan) 2021 Kitakyushu	Men's horizontal bar
Gold	Sun Wei, Yang Jiaxing, You Hao, Zhang Boheng, Zou Jingyuan, Su Weide	(United Kingdom) 2022 Liverpool	Men's team
Silver	Zhang Boheng	(United Kingdom) 2022 Liverpool	Men's all-around
Gold	Wei Xiaoyuan	(United Kingdom) 2022 Liverpool	Women's uneven bars
Silver	Zou Jingyuan	(United Kingdom) 2022 Liverpool	Men's rings
Gold	Zou Jingyuan	(United Kingdom) 2022 Liverpool	Men's parallel bars
Silver	Lin Chaopan, Liu Yang, Su Weide, Sun Wei, You Hao, Shi Cong	(Belgium) 2023 Antwerp	Men's team
Gold	Qiu Qiyuan	(Belgium) 2023 Antwerp	Women's uneven bars
Gold	Liu Yang	(Belgium) 2023 Antwerp	Men's rings
Bronze	You Hao	(Belgium) 2023 Antwerp	Men's rings
Silver	Zhou Yaqin	(Belgium) 2023 Antwerp	Women's balance beam
Silver	Shi Cong	(Belgium) 2023 Antwerp	Men's parallel bars
Bronze	Su Weide	(Belgium) 2023 Antwerp	Men's horizontal bar
Silver	Zhang Boheng	(Indonesia) 2025 Jakarta	Men's all-around
Bronze	Zhang Qingying	(Indonesia) 2025 Jakarta	Women's all-around
Gold	Hong Yanming	(Indonesia) 2025 Jakarta	Men's pommel horse
Bronze	Yang Fanyuwei	(Indonesia) 2025 Jakarta	Women's uneven bars
Bronze	Lan Xingyu	(Indonesia) 2025 Jakarta	Men's rings
Gold	Zhang Qingying	(Indonesia) 2025 Jakarta	Women's balance beam
Gold	Zou Jingyuan	(Indonesia) 2025 Jakarta	Men's parallel bars
Bronze	Lan Xingyu, Li Hongyan, Tian Hao, Yang Haonan, Zou Jingyuan, Hong Yanming	(Netherlands) 2026 Rotterdam	Men's team
Gold	Du Siyu, Ke Qinqin, Qiu Qiyuan, Zhang Qingying, Zhang Yihan, Qin Xinyi	(Netherlands) 2026 Rotterdam	Women's team
Silver	Yang Haonan	(Netherlands) 2026 Rotterdam	Men's all-around
Bronze	Ke Qinqin	(Netherlands) 2026 Rotterdam	Women's all-around
Gold	Lan Xingyu	(Netherlands) 2026 Rotterdam	Men's rings
Silver	Zhang Qingying	(Netherlands) 2026 Rotterdam	Women's balance beam
Gold	Zou Jingyuan	(Netherlands) 2026 Rotterdam	Men's parallel bars

== Medal tables ==
=== By gender ===
Gender	Gold	Silver	Bronze	Total
Men	73	39	32	144
Women	25	24	21	70

=== By event ===
Event	Gold	Silver	Bronze	Total
Men's parallel bars	19	8	4	31
Men's team	13	5	4	22
Men's rings	11	5	6	22
Women's uneven bars	11	5	6	22
Men's pommel horse	9	7	4	20
Women's balance beam	7	9	5	21
Men's horizontal bar	7	2	3	12
Men's individual all-around	6	6	3	15
Men's floor exercise	4	3	7	14
Men's vault	4	3	1	8
Women's vault	3	1	0	4
Women's team	2	5	5	12
Women's floor exercise	2	2	1	5
Women's individual all-around	0	2	4	6

== Junior World medalists ==
Medal	Name	Year	Event
Silver	Guan Chenchen, Ou Yushan, Wei Xiaoyuan, Wu Ran	(Hungary) 2019 Győr	Girls' team
Bronze	Ou Yushan	(Hungary) 2019 Győr	Girls' all-around
Bronze	Wei Xiaoyuan	(Hungary) 2019 Győr	Girls' uneven bars
Bronze	Yang Haonan	(Hungary) 2019 Győr	Boys' rings
Silver	Yang Haonan	(Hungary) 2019 Győr	Boys' vault
Silver	Wei Xiaoyuan	(Hungary) 2019 Győr	Girls' balance beam
Silver	Yang Haonan	(Hungary) 2019 Győr	Boys' parallel bars
Silver	Ou Yushan	(Hungary) 2019 Győr	Girls' floor exercise
Silver	He Xiang, Qin Guohuan, Yang Chunjie, Zhang Yangyu	(Turkey) 2023 Antalya	Boys' team
Gold	Qin Guohuan	(Turkey) 2023 Antalya	Boys' all-around
Gold	Yu Hanyue	(Turkey) 2023 Antalya	Girls' balance beam
Silver	He Xiang	(Turkey) 2023 Antalya	Boys' horizontal bar
Gold	Wang Chengcheng, Yang Lanbin, Zheng Ao	(Philippines) 2025 Manila	Boys' team
Bronze	Yang Lanbin	(Philippines) 2025 Manila	Boys' all-around
Gold	Yang Lanbin	(Philippines) 2025 Manila	Boys' floor exericse
Gold	Zheng Ao	(Philippines) 2025 Manila	Boys' pommel horse
Bronze	Wang Chengcheng	(Philippines) 2025 Manila	Boys' rings
Gold	Xiang Yina	(Philippines) 2025 Manila	Girls' balance beam
Bronze	Yang Lanbin	(Philippines) 2025 Manila	Boys' parallel bars

== See also ==
- China women's national artistic gymnastics team
- List of Olympic female artistic gymnasts for China
