= List of Olympic medalists for China =

This is a list of Chinese medalists at the Summer and Winter Olympics. For more information about Chinese participation at the Olympic Games, see China at the Olympics.

== Summer Olympics ==
| Medal | Name | Games | Sport | Event |
|---|---|---|---|---|
| Gold | Li Ning | (United States) 1984 Los Angeles | Artistic gymnastics | Men's floor exercise |
| Gold | Li Ning | (United States) 1984 Los Angeles | Artistic gymnastics | Men's pommel horse |
| Gold | Li Ning | (United States) 1984 Los Angeles | Artistic gymnastics | Men's rings |
| Gold | Lou Yun | (United States) 1984 Los Angeles | Artistic gymnastics | Men's vault |
| Gold | Ma Yanhong | (United States) 1984 Los Angeles | Artistic gymnastics | Women's uneven bars |
| Gold | Zhou Jihong | (United States) 1984 Los Angeles | Diving | Women's 10 m platform |
| Gold | Luan Jujie | (United States) 1984 Los Angeles | Fencing | Women's individual foil |
| Gold | Xu Haifeng | (United States) 1984 Los Angeles | Shooting | Men's 50 m pistol |
| Gold | Li Yuwei | (United States) 1984 Los Angeles | Shooting | Men's 50 m running target |
| Gold | Wu Xiaoxuan | (United States) 1984 Los Angeles | Shooting | Women's 50 m rifle three positions |
| Gold | China women's national volleyball team: Hou Yuzhu; Jian Ying; Lang Ping; Li Yanjun; Liang Yan; Su Huijuan; Yang Xiaojun; Yang Xilan; Zhang Rongfang; Zheng Meizhu; Zhou Xiaolan; Zhu Ling | (United States) 1984 Los Angeles | Volleyball | Women's tournament |
| Gold | Zeng Guoqiang | (United States) 1984 Los Angeles | Weightlifting | Men's 52 kg |
| Gold | Wu Shude | (United States) 1984 Los Angeles | Weightlifting | Men's 56 kg |
| Gold | Chen Weiqiang | (United States) 1984 Los Angeles | Weightlifting | Men's 60 kg |
| Gold | Yao Jingyuan | (United States) 1984 Los Angeles | Weightlifting | Men's 67.5 kg |
| Silver | Li Lingjuan | (United States) 1984 Los Angeles | Archery | Women's individual |
| Silver | Li Ning; Li Xiaoping; Li Yuejiu; Lou Yun; Tong Fei; Xu Zhiqiang | (United States) 1984 Los Angeles | Artistic gymnastics | Men's team all-around |
| Silver | Lou Yun | (United States) 1984 Los Angeles | Artistic gymnastics | Men's floor exercise |
| Silver | Tong Fei | (United States) 1984 Los Angeles | Artistic gymnastics | Men's horizontal bar |
| Silver | Li Ning | (United States) 1984 Los Angeles | Artistic gymnastics | Men's vault |
| Silver | Tan Liangde | (United States) 1984 Los Angeles | Diving | Men's 3 m springboard |
| Silver | Zhou Peishun | (United States) 1984 Los Angeles | Weightlifting | Men's 52 kg |
| Silver | Lai Runming | (United States) 1984 Los Angeles | Weightlifting | Men's 56 kg |
| Bronze | Li Ning | (United States) 1984 Los Angeles | Artistic gymnastics | Men's individual all-around |
| Bronze | Chen Yongyan; Huang Qun; Ma Yanhong; Wu Jiani; Zhou Ping; Zhou Qiurui | (United States) 1984 Los Angeles | Artistic gymnastics | Women's team all-around |
| Bronze | Zhu Jianhua | (United States) 1984 Los Angeles | Athletics | Men's high jump |
| Bronze | Li Kongzheng | (United States) 1984 Los Angeles | Diving | Men's 10 m platform |
| Bronze | Wang Yifu | (United States) 1984 Los Angeles | Shooting | Men's 50 m pistol |
| Bronze | Huang Shiping | (United States) 1984 Los Angeles | Shooting | Men's 50 m running target |
| Bronze | Wu Xiaoxuan | (United States) 1984 Los Angeles | Shooting | Women's 10 m air rifle |
| Gold | Lou Yun | (South Korea) 1988 Seoul | Artistic gymnastics | Men's vault |
| Gold | Gao Min | (South Korea) 1988 Seoul | Diving | Women's 3 m springboard |
| Gold | Xu Yanmei | (South Korea) 1988 Seoul | Diving | Women's 10 m platform |
| Gold | Chen Longcan; Wei Qingguang | (South Korea) 1988 Seoul | Table tennis | Men's doubles |
| Gold | Chen Jing | (South Korea) 1988 Seoul | Table tennis | Women's singles |
| Silver | Tan Liangde | (South Korea) 1988 Seoul | Diving | Men's 3 m springboard |
| Silver | Xiong Ni | (South Korea) 1988 Seoul | Diving | Men's 10 m platform |
| Silver | Li Qing | (South Korea) 1988 Seoul | Diving | Women's 3 m springboard |
| Silver | Zhang Xianghua; Hu Yadong; Yang Xiao; Zhou Shouying; Li Ronghua | (South Korea) 1988 Seoul | Rowing | Women's coxed four |
| Silver | Huang Shiping | (South Korea) 1988 Seoul | Shooting | Men's 50 m running target |
| Silver | Yang Wenyi | (South Korea) 1988 Seoul | Swimming | Women's 50 m freestyle |
| Silver | Zhuang Yong | (South Korea) 1988 Seoul | Swimming | Women's 100 m freestyle |
| Silver | Huang Xiaomin | (South Korea) 1988 Seoul | Swimming | Women's 200 m breaststroke |
| Silver | Li Huifen | (South Korea) 1988 Seoul | Table tennis | Women's singles |
| Silver | Chen Jing; Jiao Zhimin | (South Korea) 1988 Seoul | Table tennis | Women's doubles |
| Silver | He Yingqiang | (South Korea) 1988 Seoul | Weightlifting | Men's 56 kg |
| Bronze | Lou Yun | (South Korea) 1988 Seoul | Artistic gymnastics | Men's floor exercise |
| Bronze | Li Meisu | (South Korea) 1988 Seoul | Athletics | Women's shot put |
| Bronze | Li Deliang | (South Korea) 1988 Seoul | Diving | Men's 3 m springboard |
| Bronze | Zhou Xiuhua; Zhang Yali; He Yanwen; Han Yaqin; Zhang Xianghua; Zhou Shouying; Yang Xiao; Hu Yadong; Li Ronghua | (South Korea) 1988 Seoul | Rowing | Women's eight |
| Bronze | Xu Haifeng | (South Korea) 1988 Seoul | Shooting | Men's 10 m air pistol |
| Bronze | Qian Hong | (South Korea) 1988 Seoul | Swimming | Women's 100 m butterfly |
| Bronze | Jiao Zhimin | (South Korea) 1988 Seoul | Table tennis | Women's singles |
| Bronze | He Zhuoqiang | (South Korea) 1988 Seoul | Weightlifting | Men's 52 kg |
| Bronze | Liu Shoubin | (South Korea) 1988 Seoul | Weightlifting | Men's 56 kg |
| Bronze | Ye Huanming | (South Korea) 1988 Seoul | Weightlifting | Men's 60 kg |
| Bronze | Li Jinhe | (South Korea) 1988 Seoul | Weightlifting | Men's 67.5 kg |
| Gold | Li Xiaoshuang | (Spain) 1992 Barcelona | Artistic gymnastics | Men's floor exercise |
| Gold | Lu Li | (Spain) 1992 Barcelona | Artistic gymnastics | Women's uneven bars |
| Gold | Chen Yueling | (Spain) 1992 Barcelona | Athletics | Women's 10 km walk |
| Gold | Sun Shuwei | (Spain) 1992 Barcelona | Diving | Men's 10 m platform |
| Gold | Gao Min | (Spain) 1992 Barcelona | Diving | Women's 3 m springboard |
| Gold | Fu Mingxia | (Spain) 1992 Barcelona | Diving | Women's 10 m platform |
| Gold | Zhuang Xiaoyan | (Spain) 1992 Barcelona | Judo | Women's +72 kg |
| Gold | Wang Yifu | (Spain) 1992 Barcelona | Shooting | Men's 10 m air pistol |
| Gold | Zhang Shan | (Spain) 1992 Barcelona | Shooting | Skeet |
| Gold | Yang Wenyi | (Spain) 1992 Barcelona | Swimming | Women's 50 m freestyle |
| Gold | Zhuang Yong | (Spain) 1992 Barcelona | Swimming | Women's 100 m freestyle |
| Gold | Qian Hong | (Spain) 1992 Barcelona | Swimming | Women's 100 m butterfly |
| Gold | Lin Li | (Spain) 1992 Barcelona | Swimming | Women's 200 m individual medley |
| Gold | Lü Lin; Wang Tao | (Spain) 1992 Barcelona | Table tennis | Men's doubles |
| Gold | Deng Yaping | (Spain) 1992 Barcelona | Table tennis | Women's singles |
| Gold | Deng Yaping; Qiao Hong | (Spain) 1992 Barcelona | Table tennis | Women's doubles |
| Silver | Ma Xiangjun; Wang Hong; Wang Xiaozhu | (Spain) 1992 Barcelona | Archery | Women's team |
| Silver | Guo Linyao; Li Chunyang; Li Dashuang; Li Ge; Li Jing; Li Xiaoshuang | (Spain) 1992 Barcelona | Artistic gymnastics | Men's team all-around |
| Silver | Li Jing | (Spain) 1992 Barcelona | Artistic gymnastics | Men's parallel bars |
| Silver | Li Jing | (Spain) 1992 Barcelona | Artistic gymnastics | Men's rings |
| Silver | Lu Li | (Spain) 1992 Barcelona | Artistic gymnastics | Women's balance beam |
| Silver | Huang Zhihong | (Spain) 1992 Barcelona | Athletics | Women's shot put |
| Silver | Guan Weizhen; Nong Qunhua | (Spain) 1992 Barcelona | Badminton | Women's doubles |
| Silver | Tan Liangde | (Spain) 1992 Barcelona | Diving | Men's 3 m springboard |
| Silver | Wang Huifeng | (Spain) 1992 Barcelona | Fencing | Women's individual foil |
| Silver | Zhang Xiaodong | (Spain) 1992 Barcelona | Sailing | Women's sailboard |
| Silver | Wang Yifu | (Spain) 1992 Barcelona | Shooting | Men's 50 m pistol |
| Silver | Li Duihong | (Spain) 1992 Barcelona | Shooting | Women's 25 m pistol |
| Silver | Zhuang Yong | (Spain) 1992 Barcelona | Swimming | Women's 50 m freestyle |
| Silver | Lin Li | (Spain) 1992 Barcelona | Swimming | Women's 200 m breaststroke |
| Silver | Wang Xiaohong | (Spain) 1992 Barcelona | Swimming | Women's 200 m butterfly |
| Silver | Lin Li | (Spain) 1992 Barcelona | Swimming | Women's 400 m individual medley |
| Silver | Le Jingyi; Lü Bin; Zhuang Yong; Yang Wenyi; Zhao Kun | (Spain) 1992 Barcelona | Swimming | Women's 4 × 100 m freestyle relay |
| Silver | Qiao Hong | (Spain) 1992 Barcelona | Table tennis | Women's singles |
| Silver | Chen Zihe; Gao Jun | (Spain) 1992 Barcelona | Table tennis | Women's doubles |
| Silver | Lin Qisheng | (Spain) 1992 Barcelona | Weightlifting | Men's 52 kg |
| Silver | Liu Shoubin | (Spain) 1992 Barcelona | Weightlifting | Men's 56 kg |
| Bronze | Guo Linyao | (Spain) 1992 Barcelona | Artistic gymnastics | Men's parallel bars |
| Bronze | Li Xiaoshuang | (Spain) 1992 Barcelona | Artistic gymnastics | Men's rings |
| Bronze | Qu Yunxia | (Spain) 1992 Barcelona | Athletics | Women's 1500 m |
| Bronze | Li Chunxiu | (Spain) 1992 Barcelona | Athletics | Women's 10 km walk |
| Bronze | Li Yongbo; Tian Bingyi | (Spain) 1992 Barcelona | Badminton | Men's doubles |
| Bronze | Huang Hua | (Spain) 1992 Barcelona | Badminton | Women's singles |
| Bronze | Tang Jiuhong | (Spain) 1992 Barcelona | Badminton | Women's singles |
| Bronze | Lin Yanfen; Yao Fen | (Spain) 1992 Barcelona | Badminton | Women's doubles |
| Bronze | Xiong Ni | (Spain) 1992 Barcelona | Diving | Men's 10 m platform |
| Bronze | Li Zhongyun | (Spain) 1992 Barcelona | Judo | Women's 52 kg |
| Bronze | Zhang Di | (Spain) 1992 Barcelona | Judo | Women's 61 kg |
| Bronze | Gu Xiaoli; Lu Huali | (Spain) 1992 Barcelona | Rowing | Women's double sculls |
| Bronze | Ma Wenge | (Spain) 1992 Barcelona | Table tennis | Men's singles |
| Bronze | Luo Jianming | (Spain) 1992 Barcelona | Weightlifting | Men's 56 kg |
| Bronze | He Yingqiang | (Spain) 1992 Barcelona | Weightlifting | Men's 60 kg |
| Bronze | Sheng Zetian | (Spain) 1992 Barcelona | Wrestling | Men's Greco-Roman 57 kg |
| Gold | Li Xiaoshuang | (United States) 1996 Atlanta | Artistic gymnastics | Men's individual all-around |
| Gold | Wang Junxia | (United States) 1996 Atlanta | Athletics | Women's 5000 m |
| Gold | Ge Fei; Gu Jun | (United States) 1996 Atlanta | Badminton | Women's doubles |
| Gold | Xiong Ni | (United States) 1996 Atlanta | Diving | Men's 3 m springboard |
| Gold | Fu Mingxia | (United States) 1996 Atlanta | Diving | Women's 3 m springboard |
| Gold | Fu Mingxia | (United States) 1996 Atlanta | Diving | Women's 10 m platform |
| Gold | Sun Fuming | (United States) 1996 Atlanta | Judo | Women's +72 kg |
| Gold | Yang Ling | (United States) 1996 Atlanta | Shooting | Men's 10 m running target |
| Gold | Li Duihong | (United States) 1996 Atlanta | Shooting | Women's 25 m pistol |
| Gold | Le Jingyi | (United States) 1996 Atlanta | Swimming | Women's 100 m freestyle |
| Gold | Liu Guoliang | (United States) 1996 Atlanta | Table tennis | Men's singles |
| Gold | Liu Guoliang; Kong Linghui | (United States) 1996 Atlanta | Table tennis | Men's doubles |
| Gold | Deng Yaping | (United States) 1996 Atlanta | Table tennis | Women's singles |
| Gold | Deng Yaping; Qiao Hong | (United States) 1996 Atlanta | Table tennis | Women's doubles |
| Gold | Tang Lingsheng | (United States) 1996 Atlanta | Weightlifting | Men's 59 kg |
| Gold | Zhan Xugang | (United States) 1996 Atlanta | Weightlifting | Men's 70 kg |
| Silver | He Ying | (United States) 1996 Atlanta | Archery | Women's individual |
| Silver | Fan Bin; Fan Hongbin; Huang Huadong; Huang Liping; Li Xiaoshuang; Shen Jian; Zhang Jinjing | (United States) 1996 Atlanta | Artistic gymnastics | Men's team all-around |
| Silver | Li Xiaoshuang | (United States) 1996 Atlanta | Artistic gymnastics | Men's floor exercise |
| Silver | Bi Wenjing | (United States) 1996 Atlanta | Artistic gymnastics | Women's uneven bars |
| Silver | Mo Huilan | (United States) 1996 Atlanta | Artistic gymnastics | Women's vault |
| Silver | Wang Junxia | (United States) 1996 Atlanta | Athletics | Women's 10000 m |
| Silver | Sui Xinmei | (United States) 1996 Atlanta | Athletics | Women's shot put |
| Silver | Dong Jiong | (United States) 1996 Atlanta | Badminton | Men's singles |
| Silver | Yu Zhuocheng | (United States) 1996 Atlanta | Diving | Men's 3 m springboard |
| Silver | China women's national football team: Chen Yufeng; Fan Yunjie; Gao Hong; Liu Ailing; Liu Ying; Shi Guihong Shui Qingxia; Sun Qingmei; Sun Wen; Wang Liping; Wei Haiying; Wen Lirong; Xie Huilin; Yu Hongqi; Zhao Lihong; Zhong Honglian | (United States) 1996 Atlanta | Football | Women's tournament |
| Silver | Zhang Xiuyun; Cao Mianying | (United States) 1996 Atlanta | Rowing | Women's double sculls |
| Silver | Wang Yifu | (United States) 1996 Atlanta | Shooting | Men's 10 m air pistol |
| Silver | Xiao Jun | (United States) 1996 Atlanta | Shooting | Men's 10 m running target |
| Silver | China women's national softball team: An Zhongxin; Chen Hong; He Liping; Lei Li; Liu Xuqing; Liu Yaju Ma Ying; Ou Jingbai; Tao Hua; Wang Lihong; Wang Ying; Wei Qiang; Xu Jian; Yan Fang; Zhang Chunfang | (United States) 1996 Atlanta | Softball | Women's tournament |
| Silver | Le Jingyi | (United States) 1996 Atlanta | Swimming | Women's 50 m freestyle |
| Silver | Liu Limin | (United States) 1996 Atlanta | Swimming | Women's 100 m butterfly |
| Silver | Le Jingyi; Chao Na; Nian Yun; Shan Ying | (United States) 1996 Atlanta | Swimming | Women's 4 × 100 m freestyle relay |
| Silver | Wang Tao | (United States) 1996 Atlanta | Table tennis | Men's singles |
| Silver | Lü Lin; Wang Tao | (United States) 1996 Atlanta | Table tennis | Men's doubles |
| Silver | Liu Wei; Qiao Yunping | (United States) 1996 Atlanta | Table tennis | Women's doubles |
| Silver | China women's national volleyball team: Cui Yong-Mei; He Qi; Lai Yawen; Li Yan; Liu Xiaoning; Pan Wenli; Sun Yue; Wang Lina; Wang Yi; Wang Ziling; Wu Yongmei; Zhu Yunying | (United States) 1996 Atlanta | Volleyball | Women's tournament |
| Silver | Zhang Xiangsen | (United States) 1996 Atlanta | Weightlifting | Men's 54 kg |
| Bronze | Fan Bin | (United States) 1996 Atlanta | Artistic gymnastics | Men's horizontal bar |
| Bronze | Wang Yan | (United States) 1996 Atlanta | Athletics | Women's 10 km walk |
| Bronze | Qin Yiyuan; Tang Yongshu | (United States) 1996 Atlanta | Badminton | Women's doubles |
| Bronze | Liu Jianjun; Sun Man | (United States) 1996 Atlanta | Badminton | Mixed doubles |
| Bronze | Xiao Hailiang | (United States) 1996 Atlanta | Diving | Men's 10 m platform |
| Bronze | Wang Xianbo | (United States) 1996 Atlanta | Judo | Women's 66 kg |
| Bronze | Zhang Bing | (United States) 1996 Atlanta | Shooting | Men's double trap |
| Bronze | Lin Li | (United States) 1996 Atlanta | Swimming | Women's 200 m individual medley |
| Bronze | Chen Yan; Han Xue; Cai Huijue; Shan Ying | (United States) 1996 Atlanta | Swimming | Women's 4 × 100 m medley relay |
| Bronze | Qiao Hong | (United States) 1996 Atlanta | Table tennis | Women's singles |
| Bronze | Xiao Jiangang | (United States) 1996 Atlanta | Weightlifting | Men's 64 kg |
| Bronze | Sheng Zetian | (United States) 1996 Atlanta | Wrestling | Men's Greco-Roman 57 kg |
| Gold | Huang Xu; Li Xiaopeng; Xiao Junfeng; Xing Aowei; Yang Wei; Zheng Lihui | (Australia) 2000 Sydney | Artistic gymnastics | Men's team all-around |
| Gold | Li Xiaopeng | (Australia) 2000 Sydney | Artistic gymnastics | Men's parallel bars |
| Gold | Liu Xuan | (Australia) 2000 Sydney | Artistic gymnastics | Women's balance beam |
| Gold | Wang Liping | (Australia) 2000 Sydney | Athletics | Women's 20 km walk |
| Gold | Ji Xinpeng | (Australia) 2000 Sydney | Badminton | Men's singles |
| Gold | Gong Zhichao | (Australia) 2000 Sydney | Badminton | Women's singles |
| Gold | Ge Fei; Gu Jun | (Australia) 2000 Sydney | Badminton | Women's doubles |
| Gold | Gao Ling; Zhang Jun | (Australia) 2000 Sydney | Badminton | Mixed doubles |
| Gold | Xiong Ni | (Australia) 2000 Sydney | Diving | Men's 3 m springboard |
| Gold | Xiong Ni; Xiao Hailiang | (Australia) 2000 Sydney | Diving | Men's synchronized 3 m springboard |
| Gold | Tian Liang | (Australia) 2000 Sydney | Diving | Men's 10 m platform |
| Gold | Fu Mingxia | (Australia) 2000 Sidney | Diving | Women's 3 m springboard |
| Gold | Li Na; Sang Xue | (Australia) 2000 Sydney | Diving | Women's synchronized 10 m platform |
| Gold | Tang Lin | (Australia) 2000 Sidney | Judo | Women's 78 kg |
| Gold | Yuan Hua | (Australia) 2000 Sidney | Judo | Women's +78 kg |
| Gold | Cai Yalin | (Australia) 2000 Sidney | Shooting | Men's 10 m air rifle |
| Gold | Yang Ling | (Australia) 2000 Sidney | Shooting | Men's 10 m running target |
| Gold | Tao Luna | (Australia) 2000 Sidney | Shooting | Women's 10 m air pistol |
| Gold | Kong Linghui | (Australia) 2000 Sydney | Table tennis | Men's singles |
| Gold | Wang Liqin; Yan Sen | (Australia) 2000 Sydney | Table tennis | Men's doubles |
| Gold | Wang Nan | (Australia) 2000 Sydney | Table tennis | Women's singles |
| Gold | Li Ju; Wang Nan | (Australia) 2000 Sydney | Table tennis | Women's doubles |
| Gold | Chen Zhong | (Australia) 2000 Sydney | Taekwondo | Women's +67 kg |
| Gold | Zhan Xugang | (Australia) 2000 Sydney | Weightlifting | Men's 77 kg |
| Gold | Yang Xia | (Australia) 2000 Sydney | Weightlifting | Women's 53 kg |
| Gold | Chen Xiaomin | (Australia) 2000 Sydney | Weightlifting | Women's 63 kg |
| Gold | Lin Weining | (Australia) 2000 Sydney | Weightlifting | Women's 69 kg |
| Gold | Ding Meiyuan | (Australia) 2000 Sydney | Weightlifting | Women's +75 kg |
| Silver | Yang Wei | (Australia) 2000 Sydney | Artistic gymnastics | Men's individual all-around |
| Silver | Ling Jie | (Australia) 2000 Sydney | Artistic gymnastics | Women's uneven bars |
| Silver | Huang Nanyan; Yang Wei | (Australia) 2000 Sydney | Badminton | Women's doubles |
| Silver | Hu Jia | (Australia) 2000 Sidney | Diving | Men's 10 m platform |
| Silver | Hu Jia; Tian Liang | (Australia) 2000 Sidney | Diving | Men's synchronized 10 m platform |
| Silver | Guo Jingjing | (Australia) 2000 Sidney | Diving | Women's 3 m springboard |
| Silver | Fu Mingxia; Guo Jingjing | (Australia) 2000 Sidney | Diving | Women's synchronized 3 m springboard |
| Silver | Li Na | (Australia) 2000 Sidney | Diving | Women's 10 m platform |
| Silver | Dong Zhaozhi; Wang Haibin; Ye Chong | (Australia) 2000 Sidney | Fencing | Men's team foil |
| Silver | Li Shufang | (Australia) 2000 Sidney | Judo | Women's 63 kg |
| Silver | Wang Yifu | (Australia) 2000 Sidney | Shooting | Men's 10 m air pistol |
| Silver | Tao Luna | (Australia) 2000 Sidney | Shooting | Women's 25 m air pistol |
| Silver | Liu Guoliang; Kong Linghui | (Australia) 2000 Sydney | Table tennis | Men's doubles |
| Silver | Li Ju | (Australia) 2000 Sydney | Table tennis | Women's singles |
| Silver | Sun Jin; Yang Ying | (Australia) 2000 Sydney | Table tennis | Women's doubles |
| Silver | Wu Wenxiong | (Australia) 2000 Sydney | Weightlifting | Men's 56 kg |
| Bronze | Liu Xuan | (Australia) 2000 Sydney | Artistic gymnastics | Women's individual all-around |
| Bronze | Yang Yun | (Australia) 2000 Sydney | Artistic gymnastics | Women's uneven bars |
| Bronze | Xia Xuanze | (Australia) 2000 Sydney | Badminton | Men's singles |
| Bronze | Ye Zhaoying | (Australia) 2000 Sydney | Badminton | Women's singles |
| Bronze | Gao Ling; Qin Yiyuan | (Australia) 2000 Sydney | Badminton | Women's doubles |
| Bronze | Jiang Cuihua | (Australia) 2000 Sydney | Cycling | Women's track time trial |
| Bronze | Li Na; Liang Qin; Yang Shaoqi | (Australia) 2000 Sidney | Fencing | Women's team épée |
| Bronze | Liu Yuxiang | (Australia) 2000 Sidney | Judo | Women's 52 kg |
| Bronze | Niu Zhiyuan | (Australia) 2000 Sidney | Shooting | Men's 10 m running target |
| Bronze | Gao Jing | (Australia) 2000 Sidney | Shooting | Women's 10 m rifle |
| Bronze | Gao E | (Australia) 2000 Sidney | Shooting | Women's trap |
| Bronze | Liu Guoliang | (Australia) 2000 Sydney | Table tennis | Men's singles |
| Bronze | Zhang Xiangxiang | (Australia) 2000 Sydney | Weightlifting | Men's 56 kg |
| Bronze | Sheng Zetian | (Australia) 2000 Sydney | Wrestling | Men's Greco-Roman 58 kg |
| Gold | Teng Haibin | (Greece) 2004 Athens | Artistic gymnastics | Men's pommel horse |
| Gold | Liu Xiang | (Greece) 2004 Athens | Athletics | Men's 110 m hurdles |
| Gold | Xing Huina | (Greece) 2004 Athens | Athletics | Women's 10000 m |
| Gold | Zhang Ning | (Greece) 2004 Athens | Badminton | Women's singles |
| Gold | Yang Wei; Zhang Jiewen | (Greece) 2004 Athens | Badminton | Women's doubles |
| Gold | Gao Ling; Zhang Jun | (Greece) 2004 Athens | Badminton | Mixed doubles |
| Gold | Meng Guanliang; Yang Wenjun | (Greece) 2004 Athens | Canoeing | Men's C-2 500 m |
| Gold | Peng Bo | (Greece) 2004 Athens | Diving | Men's 3 m springboard |
| Gold | Hu Jia | (Greece) 2004 Athens | Diving | Men's 10 m platform |
| Gold | Tian Liang; Yang Jinghui | (Greece) 2004 Athens | Diving | Men's synchronized 10 m platform |
| Gold | Guo Jingjing | (Greece) 2004 Athens | Diving | Women's 3 m springboard |
| Gold | Guo Jingjing; Wu Minxia | (Greece) 2004 Athens | Diving | Women's synchronized 3 m springboard |
| Gold | Li Ting; Lao Lishi | (Greece) 2004 Athens | Diving | Women's synchronized 10 m platform |
| Gold | Xian Dongmei | (Greece) 2004 Athens | Judo | Women's 52 kg |
| Gold | Wang Yifu | (Greece) 2004 Athens | Shooting | Men's 10 m air pistol |
| Gold | Zhu Qinan | (Greece) 2004 Athens | Shooting | Men's 10 m air rifle |
| Gold | Jia Zhanbo | (Greece) 2004 Athens | Shooting | Men's 50 m rifle three positions |
| Gold | Du Li | (Greece) 2004 Athens | Shooting | Women's 10 m air rifle |
| Gold | Luo Xuejuan | (Greece) 2004 Athens | Swimming | Women's 100 m backstroke |
| Gold | Chen Qi; Ma Lin | (Greece) 2004 Athens | Table tennis | Men's doubles |
| Gold | Zhang Yining | (Greece) 2004 Athens | Table tennis | Women's singles |
| Gold | Wang Nan; Zhang Yining | (Greece) 2004 Athens | Table tennis | Women's doubles |
| Gold | Luo Wei | (Greece) 2004 Athens | Taekwondo | Women's 67 kg |
| Gold | Chen Zhong | (Greece) 2004 Athens | Taekwondo | Women's +67 kg |
| Gold | Li Ting; Sun Tiantian | (Greece) 2004 Athens | Tennis | Women's doubles |
| Gold | China women's national volleyball team: Chen Jing; Feng Kun; Li Shan; Liu Yanan; Song Nina; Wang Lina; Yang Hao; Zhang Na; Zhang Ping; Zhang Yuehong; Zhao Ruirui; Zhou Suhong | (Greece) 2004 Athens | Volleyball | Women's tournament |
| Gold | Shi Zhiyong | (Greece) 2004 Athens | Weightlifting | Men's 62 kg |
| Gold | Zhang Guozheng | (Greece) 2004 Athens | Weightlifting | Men's 69 kg |
| Gold | Chen Yanqing | (Greece) 2004 Athens | Weightlifting | Women's 58 kg |
| Gold | Liu Chunhong | (Greece) 2004 Athens | Weightlifting | Women's 69 kg |
| Gold | Tang Gonghong | (Greece) 2004 Athens | Weightlifting | Women's +75 kg |
| Gold | Wang Xu | (Greece) 2004 Athens | Wrestling | Women's freestyle 72 kg |
| Silver | He Ying; Lin Sang; Zhang Juanjuan | (Greece) 2004 Athens | Archery | Women's team |
| Silver | Gao Ling; Huang Sui | (Greece) 2004 Athens | Badminton | Women's doubles |
| Silver | Jiang Yonghua | (Greece) 2004 Athens | Cycling | Women's 3 m springboard |
| Silver | Wu Minxia | (Greece) 2004 Athens | Diving | Women's 3 m springboard |
| Silver | Lao Lishi | (Greece) 2004 Athens | Diving | Women's 10 m platform |
| Silver | Wang Lei | (Greece) 2004 Athens | Fencing | Men's individual épée |
| Silver | Dong Zhaozhi; Wang Haibin; Wu Hanxiong; Ye Chong | (Greece) 2004 Athens | Fencing | Men's team foil |
| Silver | Tan Xue | (Greece) 2004 Athens | Fencing | Women's individual sabre |
| Silver | Liu Xia | (Greece) 2004 Athens | Judo | Women's 78 kg |
| Silver | Yin Jian | (Greece) 2004 Athens | Sailing | Women's sailboard |
| Silver | Li Jie | (Greece) 2004 Athens | Shooting | Men's 10 m air rifle |
| Silver | Wei Ning | (Greece) 2004 Athens | Shooting | Women's skeet |
| Silver | Li Ji; Pang Jiaying; Xu Yanwei; Yang Yu; Zhu Yingwen | (Greece) 2004 Athens | Swimming | Women's 4 × 200 m freestyle relay |
| Silver | Wang Hao | (Greece) 2004 Athens | Table tennis | Men's singles |
| Silver | Wu Meijin | (Greece) 2004 Athens | Weightlifting | Men's 56 kg |
| Silver | Le Maosheng | (Greece) 2004 Athens | Weightlifting | Men's 62 kg |
| Silver | Li Zhuo | (Greece) 2004 Athens | Weightlifting | Women's 48 kg |
| Bronze | Li Xiaopeng | (Greece) 2004 Athens | Artistic gymnastics | Men's parallel bars |
| Bronze | Zhang Nan | (Greece) 2004 Athens | Artistic gymnastics | Women's individual all-around |
| Bronze | Zhou Mi | (Greece) 2004 Athens | Badminton | Women's singles |
| Bronze | Zou Shiming | (Greece) 2004 Athens | Boxing | Men's light flyweight |
| Bronze | Tian Liang | (Greece) 2004 Athens | Diving | Men's 10 m platform |
| Bronze | Gao Feng | (Greece) 2004 Athens | Judo | Women's 48 kg |
| Bronze | Qin Dongya | (Greece) 2004 Athens | Judo | Women's 70 kg |
| Bronze | Sun Fuming | (Greece) 2004 Athens | Judo | Women's +78 kg |
| Bronze | Wang Zheng | (Greece) 2004 Athens | Shooting | Men's double trap |
| Bronze | Wang Chengyi | (Greece) 2004 Athens | Shooting | Women's 50 m rifle three positions |
| Bronze | Gao E | (Greece) 2004 Athens | Shooting | Women's double trap |
| Bronze | Niu Jianfeng; Guo Yue | (Greece) 2004 Athens | Table tennis | Women's doubles |
| Bronze | Wang Liqin | (Greece) 2004 Athens | Table tennis | Men's singles |
| Bronze | Huang Shanshan | (Greece) 2004 Athens | Trampoline | Women's individual trampoline |
| Gold | Zhang Juanjuan | (China) 2008 Beijing | Archery | Women's individual |
| Gold | Chen Yibing; Huang Xu; Li Xiaopeng; Xiao Qin; Yang Wei; Zou Kai | (China) 2008 Beijing | Artistic gymnastics | Men's team all-around |
| Gold | Yang Wei | (China) 2008 Beijing | Artistic gymnastics | Men's individual all-around |
| Gold | Zou Kai | (China) 2008 Beijing | Artistic gymnastics | Men's floor exercise |
| Gold | Zou Kai | (China) 2008 Beijing | Artistic gymnastics | Men's horizontal bar |
| Gold | Li Xiaopeng | (China) 2008 Beijing | Artistic gymnastics | Men's parallel bars |
| Gold | Xiao Qin | (China) 2008 Beijing | Artistic gymnastics | Men's pommel horse |
| Gold | Chen Yibing | (China) 2008 Beijing | Artistic gymnastics | Men's rings |
| Gold | Cheng Fei; Deng Linlin; He Kexin; Jiang Yuyuan; Li Shanshan; Yang Yilin | (China) 2008 Beijing | Artistic gymnastics | Women's team all-around |
| Gold | He Kexin | (China) 2008 Beijing | Artistic gymnastics | Women's uneven bars |
| Gold | Lin Dan | (China) 2008 Beijing | Badminton | Men's singles |
| Gold | Zhang Ning | (China) 2008 Beijing | Badminton | Women's singles |
| Gold | Du Jing; Yu Yang | (China) 2008 Beijing | Badminton | Women's doubles |
| Gold | Zou Shiming | (China) 2008 Beijing | Boxing | Men's light flyweight |
| Gold | Zhang Xiaoping | (China) 2008 Beijing | Boxing | Men's light heavyweight |
| Gold | Meng Guanliang; Yang Wenjun | (China) 2008 Beijing | Canoeing | Men's C-2 500 m |
| Gold | He Chong | (China) 2008 Beijing | Diving | Men's 3 m springboard |
| Gold | Qin Kai; Wang Feng | (China) 2008 Beijing | Diving | Men's synchronized 3 m springboard |
| Gold | Huo Liang; Lin Yue | (China) 2008 Beijing | Diving | Men's synchronized 10 m platform |
| Gold | Guo Jingjing | (China) 2008 Beijing | Diving | Women's 3 m springboard |
| Gold | Guo Jingjing; Wu Minxia | (China) 2008 Beijing | Diving | Women's synchronized 3 m springboard |
| Gold | Chen Ruolin | (China) 2008 Beijing | Diving | Women's 10 m platform |
| Gold | Chen Ruolin; Wang Xin | (China) 2008 Beijing | Diving | Women's synchronized 10 m platform |
| Gold | Zhong Man | (China) 2008 Beijing | Fencing | Men's individual sabre |
| Gold | Xian Dongmei | (China) 2008 Beijing | Judo | Women's 52 kg |
| Gold | Yang Xiuli | (China) 2008 Beijing | Judo | Women's 78 kg |
| Gold | Tong Wen | (China) 2008 Beijing | Judo | Women's +78 kg |
| Gold | Jin Ziwei; Tang Bin; Xi Aihua; Zhang Yangyang | (China) 2008 Beijing | Rowing | Women's quadruple sculls |
| Gold | Yin Jian | (China) 2008 Beijing | Sailing | Women's sailboard |
| Gold | Pang Wei | (China) 2008 Beijing | Shooting | Men's 10 m air pistol |
| Gold | Qiu Jian | (China) 2008 Beijing | Shooting | Men's 50 m rifle three positions |
| Gold | Guo Wenjun | (China) 2008 Beijing | Shooting | Women's 10 m air pistol |
| Gold | Chen Ying | (China) 2008 Beijing | Shooting | Women's 25 m pistol |
| Gold | Du Li | (China) 2008 Beijing | Shooting | Women's 50 m rifle three positions |
| Gold | Liu Zige | (China) 2008 Beijing | Swimming | Women's 200 m butterfly |
| Gold | Ma Lin | (China) 2008 Beijing | Table tennis | Men's singles |
| Gold | Ma Lin; Wang Hao; Wang Liqin | (China) 2008 Beijing | Table tennis | Men's team |
| Gold | Zhang Yining | (China) 2008 Beijing | Table tennis | Women's singles |
| Gold | Guo Yue; Wang Nan; Zhang Yining | (China) 2008 Beijing | Table tennis | Women's team |
| Gold | Wu Jingyu | (China) 2008 Beijing | Taekwondo | Women's 49 kg |
| Gold | Lu Chunlong | (China) 2008 Beijing | Trampoline | Men's individual trampoline |
| Gold | He Wenna | (China) 2008 Beijing | Trampoline | Women's individual trampoline |
| Gold | Long Qingquan | (China) 2008 Beijing | Weightlifting | Men's 56 kg |
| Gold | Zhang Xiangxiang | (China) 2008 Beijing | Weightlifting | Men's 62 kg |
| Gold | Liao Hui | (China) 2008 Beijing | Weightlifting | Men's 69 kg |
| Gold | Lu Yong | (China) 2008 Beijing | Weightlifting | Men's 85 kg |
| Gold | Chen Yanqing | (China) 2008 Beijing | Weightlifting | Women's 58 kg |
| Gold | Wang Jiao | (China) 2008 Beijing | Wrestling | Women's freestyle 72 kg |
| Silver | Chen Ling; Guo Dan; Zhang Juanjuan | (China) 2008 Beijing | Archery | Women's team |
| Silver | Zhang Wenxiu | (China) 2008 Beijing | Athletics | Women's hammer throw |
| Silver | Cai Yun; Fu Haifeng | (China) 2008 Beijing | Badminton | Men's doubles |
| Silver | Xie Xingfang | (China) 2008 Beijing | Badminton | Women's singles |
| Silver | Tian Jia; Wang Jie | (China) 2008 Beijing | Beach volleyball | Women's tournament |
| Silver | Zhou Lüxin | (China) 2008 Beijing | Diving | Men's 10 m platform |
| Silver | China women's national field hockey team: Cheng Hui; Chen Qiuqi; Chen Zhaoxia; Fu Baorong; Gao Lihua; Huang Junxia; Li Hongxia; Li Shuang; Ma Yibo; Pan Fengzhen; Ren Ye; Song Qingling; Tang Chunling; Zhao Yudiao; Zhang Yimeng; Zhou Wanfeng | (China) 2008 Beijing | Field hockey | Women's tournament |
| Silver | Cai Tongtong; Chou Tao; Lü Yuanyang; Sui Jianshuang; Sun Dan; Zhang Shuo | (China) 2008 Beijing | Rhythmic gymnastics | Group all-around |
| Silver | Gao Yulan; Wu You | (China) 2008 Beijing | Rowing | Women's coxless pair |
| Silver | Zhang Lin | (China) 2008 Beijing | Swimming | Men's 400 m freestyle |
| Silver | Jiao Liuyang | (China) 2008 Beijing | Swimming | Women's 200 m butterfly |
| Silver | Yang Yu; Zhu Qianwei; Tan Miao; Pang Jiaying; Tang Jingzhi | (China) 2008 Beijing | Swimming | Women's 4 × 200 m freestyle relay |
| Silver | Wang Hao | (China) 2008 Beijing | Table tennis | Men's singles |
| Silver | Wang Nan | (China) 2008 Beijing | Table tennis | Women's singles |
| Silver | Li Hongli | (China) 2008 Beijing | Weightlifting | Men's 77 kg |
| Bronze | Jiang Lin; Li Wenquan; Xue Haifeng | (China) 2008 Beijing | Archery | Men's team |
| Bronze | Cheng Fei | (China) 2008 Beijing | Artistic gymnastics | Women's balance beam |
| Bronze | Yang Yilin | (China) 2008 Beijing | Artistic gymnastics | Women's individual all-around |
| Bronze | Yang Yilin | (China) 2008 Beijing | Artistic gymnastics | Women's uneven bars |
| Bronze | Cheng Fei | (China) 2008 Beijing | Artistic gymnastics | Women's vault |
| Bronze | Zhou Chunxiu | (China) 2008 Beijing | Athletics | Women's marathon |
| Bronze | Chen Jin | (China) 2008 Beijing | Badminton | Men's singles |
| Bronze | Zhang Yawen; Wei Yili | (China) 2008 Beijing | Badminton | Women's doubles |
| Bronze | He Hanbin; Yu Yang | (China) 2008 Beijing | Badminton | Mixed doubles |
| Bronze | Xue Chen; Zhang Xi | (China) 2008 Beijing | Beach volleyball | Women's tournament |
| Bronze | Guo Shuang | (China) 2008 Beijing | Cycling | Women's sprint |
| Bronze | Qin Kai | (China) 2008 Beijing | Diving | Men's 3 m springboard |
| Bronze | Wu Minxia | (China) 2008 Beijing | Diving | Women's 3 m springboard |
| Bronze | Wang Xin | (China) 2008 Sidney | Diving | Women's 10 m platform |
| Bronze | Pang Jiaying | (China) 2008 Beijing | Swimming | Women's 200 m freestyle |
| Bronze | Zhao Jing; Sun Ye; Zhou Yafei; Pang Jiaying; Xu Tianlongzi | (China) 2008 Beijing | Swimming | Women's 4 × 100 m medley relay |
| Bronze | Wang Liqin | (China) 2008 Beijing | Table tennis | Men's singles |
| Bronze | Guo Yue | (China) 2008 Beijing | Table tennis | Women's singles |
| Bronze | Yan Zi; Zheng Jie | (China) 2008 Beijing | Tennis | Women's doubles |
| Bronze | Dong Dong | (China) 2008 Beijing | Trampoline | Men's individual trampoline |
| Bronze | China women's national volleyball team: Feng Kun; Li Juan; Liu Yanan; Ma Yunwen; Wang Yimei; Wei Qiuyue; Xu Yunli; Xue Ming; Yang Hao; Zhang Na; Zhao Ruirui; Zhou Suhong | (China) 2008 Beijing | Volleyball | Women's tournament |
| Gold | Chen Yibing; Feng Zhe; Guo Weiyang; Zhang Chenglong; Zou Kai | (United Kingdom) 2012 London | Artistic gymnastics | Men's team all-around |
| Gold | Zou Kai | (United Kingdom) 2012 London | Artistic gymnastics | Men's floor exercise |
| Gold | Feng Zhe | (United Kingdom) 2012 London | Artistic gymnastics | Men's parallel bars |
| Gold | Deng Linlin | (United Kingdom) 2012 London | Artistic gymnastics | Women's balance beam |
| Gold | Chen Ding | (United Kingdom) 2012 London | Athletics | Men's 20 km walk |
| Gold | Lin Dan | (United Kingdom) 2012 London | Badminton | Men's singles |
| Gold | Cai Yun; Fu Haifeng | (United Kingdom) 2012 London | Badminton | Men's doubles |
| Gold | Li Xuerui | (United Kingdom) 2012 London | Badminton | Women's singles |
| Gold | Tian Qing; Zhao Yunlei | (United Kingdom) 2012 London | Badminton | Women's doubles |
| Gold | Zhang Nan; Zhao Yunlei | (United Kingdom) 2012 London | Badminton | Mixed doubles |
| Gold | Zou Shiming | (United Kingdom) 2012 London | Boxing | Men's light flyweight |
| Gold | Luo Yutong; Qin Kai | (United Kingdom) 2012 London | Diving | Men's synchronized 3 m springboard |
| Gold | Cao Yuan; Zhang Yanquan | (United Kingdom) 2012 London | Diving | Men's synchronized 10 m platform |
| Gold | Wu Minxia | (United Kingdom) 2012 London | Diving | Women's 3 m springboard |
| Gold | He Zi; Wu Minxia | (United Kingdom) 2012 London | Diving | Women's synchronized 3 m springboard |
| Gold | Chen Ruolin | (United Kingdom) 2012 London | Diving | Women's 10 m platform |
| Gold | Chen Ruolin; Wang Hao | (United Kingdom) 2012 London | Diving | Women's synchronized 10 m platform |
| Gold | Lei Sheng | (United Kingdom) 2012 London | Fencing | Men's individual foil |
| Gold | Li Na; Luo Xiaojuan; Sun Yujie; Xu Anqi | (United Kingdom) 2012 London | Fencing | Women's team épée |
| Gold | Xu Lijia | (United Kingdom) 2012 London | Sailing | Women's Laser Radial |
| Gold | Guo Wenjun | (United Kingdom) 2012 London | Shooting | Women's 10 m air pistol |
| Gold | Yi Siling | (United Kingdom) 2012 London | Shooting | Women's 10 m air rifle |
| Gold | Sun Yang | (United Kingdom) 2012 London | Swimming | Men's 400 m freestyle |
| Gold | Sun Yang | (United Kingdom) 2012 London | Swimming | Men's 1500 m freestyle |
| Gold | Jiao Liuyang | (United Kingdom) 2012 London | Swimming | Women's 200 m butterfly |
| Gold | Ye Shiwen | (United Kingdom) 2012 London | Swimming | Women's 200 m individual medley |
| Gold | Ye Shiwen | (United Kingdom) 2012 London | Swimming | Women's 400 m individual medley |
| Gold | Zhang Jike | (United Kingdom) 2012 London | Table tennis | Men's singles |
| Gold | Ma Long; Wang Hao; Zhang Jike | (United Kingdom) 2012 London | Table tennis | Men's team |
| Gold | Li Xiaoxia | (United Kingdom) 2012 London | Table tennis | Women's singles |
| Gold | Ding Ning; Guo Yue; Li Xiaoxia | (United Kingdom) 2012 London | Table tennis | Women's team |
| Gold | Wu Jingyu | (United Kingdom) 2012 London | Taekwondo | Women's 49 kg |
| Gold | Dong Dong | (United Kingdom) 2012 London | Trampoline | Men's individual trampoline |
| Gold | Lin Qingfeng | (United Kingdom) 2012 London | Weightlifting | Men's 69 kg |
| Gold | Lü Xiaojun | (United Kingdom) 2012 London | Weightlifting | Men's 77 kg |
| Gold | Wang Mingjuan | (United Kingdom) 2012 London | Weightlifting | Women's 48 kg |
| Gold | Li Xueying | (United Kingdom) 2012 London | Weightlifting | Women's 58 kg |
| Gold | Zhou Lulu | (United Kingdom) 2012 London | Weightlifting | Women's +77 kg |
| Silver | Cheng Ming; Fang Yuting; Xu Jing | (United Kingdom) 2012 London | Archery | Women's team |
| Silver | Chen Yibing | (United Kingdom) 2012 London | Artistic gymnastics | Men's rings |
| Silver | He Kexin | (United Kingdom) 2012 London | Artistic gymnastics | Women's uneven bars |
| Silver | Sui Lu | (United Kingdom) 2012 London | Artistic gymnastics | Women's balance beam |
| Silver | Si Tianfeng | (United Kingdom) 2012 London | Athletics | Men's 50 km walk |
| Silver | Qieyang Shenjie | (United Kingdom) 2012 London | Athletics | Women's 20 km walk |
| Silver | Li Yanfeng | (United Kingdom) 2012 London | Athletics | Women's discus throw |
| Silver | Gong Lijiao | (United Kingdom) 2012 London | Athletics | Women's shot put |
| Silver | Wang Yihan | (United Kingdom) 2012 London | Badminton | Women's singles |
| Silver | Ma Jin; Xu Chen | (United Kingdom) 2012 London | Badminton | Mixed doubles |
| Silver | Guo Shuang | (United Kingdom) 2012 London | Cycling | Women's keirin |
| Silver | Gong Jinjie; Guo Shuang | (United Kingdom) 2012 London | Cycling | Women's team sprint |
| Silver | Qin Kai | (United Kingdom) 2012 London | Diving | Men's 3 m springboard |
| Silver | Qiu Bo | (United Kingdom) 2012 London | Diving | Men's 10 m platform |
| Silver | He Zi | (United Kingdom) 2012 London | Diving | Women's 3 m springboard |
| Silver | Chen Ying | (United Kingdom) 2012 London | Shooting | Women's 25 m pistol |
| Silver | Wei Ning | (United Kingdom) 2012 London | Shooting | Women's skeet |
| Silver | Xu Lili | (United Kingdom) 2012 London | Judo | Women's 63 kg |
| Silver | Sun Yang | (United Kingdom) 2012 London | Swimming | Men's 200 m freestyle |
| Silver | Lu Ying | (United Kingdom) 2012 London | Swimming | Women's 100 m butterfly |
| Silver | Wang Hao | (United Kingdom) 2012 London | Table tennis | Men's singles |
| Silver | Ding Ning | (United Kingdom) 2012 London | Table tennis | Women's singles |
| Silver | Huang Shanshan | (United Kingdom) 2012 London | Trampoline | Women's individual trampoline |
| Bronze | Dai Xiaoxiang | (United Kingdom) 2012 London | Archery | Men's individual |
| Bronze | Zou Kai | (United Kingdom) 2012 London | Artistic gymnastics | Men's horizontal bar |
| Bronze | Wang Zhen | (United Kingdom) 2012 London | Athletics | Men's 20 km walk |
| Bronze | Liu Hong | (United Kingdom) 2012 London | Athletics | Women's 20 km walk |
| Bronze | Zhang Wenxiu | (United Kingdom) 2012 London | Athletics | Women's hammer throw |
| Bronze | Li Ling | (United Kingdom) 2012 London | Athletics | Women's shot put |
| Bronze | Chen Long | (United Kingdom) 2012 London | Badminton | Men's singles |
| Bronze | Guo Shuang | (United Kingdom) 2012 London | Cycling | Women's sprint |
| Bronze | He Chong | (United Kingdom) 2012 London | Diving | Men's 3 m springboard |
| Bronze | Sun Yujie | (United Kingdom) 2012 London | Fencing | Women's individual épée |
| Bronze | Hao Yun; Li Yunqi; Jiang Haiqi; Sun Yang; Lü Zhiwu; Dai Jun | (United Kingdom) 2012 London | Swimming | Men's 4 × 200 m freestyle relay |
| Bronze | Tang Yi | (United Kingdom) 2012 London | Swimming | Women's 100 m freestyle |
| Bronze | Li Xuanxu | (United Kingdom) 2012 London | Swimming | Women's 400 m individual medley |
| Bronze | Lu Chunlong | (United Kingdom) 2012 London | Trampoline | Men's individual trampoline |
| Bronze | He Wenna | (United Kingdom) 2012 London | Trampoline | Women's individual trampoline |
| Gold | Wang Zhen | (Brazil) 2016 Rio de Janeiro | Athletics | Men's 20 km walk |
| Gold | Liu Hong | (Brazil) 2016 Rio de Janeiro | Athletics | Women's 20 km walk |
| Gold | Chen Long | (Brazil) 2016 Rio de Janeiro | Badminton | Men's singles |
| Gold | Fu Haifeng; Zhang Nan | (Brazil) 2016 Rio de Janeiro | Badminton | Men's doubles |
| Gold | Gong Jinjie; Zhong Tianshi | (Brazil) 2016 Rio de Janeiro | Cycling | Women's team sprint |
| Gold | Cao Yuan | (Brazil) 2016 Rio de Janeiro | Diving | Men's 3 m springboard |
| Gold | Chen Aisen | (Brazil) 2016 Rio de Janeiro | Diving | Men's 10 m platform |
| Gold | Chen Aisen; Lin Yue | (Brazil) 2016 Rio de Janeiro | Diving | Men's synchronized 10 m platform |
| Gold | Shi Tingmao | (Brazil) 2016 Rio de Janeiro | Diving | Women's 3 m springboard |
| Gold | Shi Tingmao; Wu Minxia | (Brazil) 2016 Rio de Janeiro | Diving | Women's synchronized 3 m springboard |
| Gold | Ren Qian | (Brazil) 2016 Rio de Janeiro | Diving | Women's 10 m platform |
| Gold | Chen Ruolin; Liu Huixia | (Brazil) 2016 Rio de Janeiro | Diving | Women's synchronized 10 m platform |
| Gold | Zhang Mengxue | (Brazil) 2016 Rio de Janeiro | Shooting | Women's 10 m air pistol |
| Gold | Sun Yang | (Brazil) 2016 Rio de Janeiro | Swimming | Men's 200 m freestyle |
| Gold | Ma Long | (Brazil) 2016 Rio de Janeiro | Table tennis | Men's singles |
| Gold | Ma Long; Xu Xin; Zhang Jike | (Brazil) 2016 Rio de Janeiro | Table tennis | Men's singles |
| Gold | Ding Ning | (Brazil) 2016 Rio de Janeiro | Table tennis | Women's singles |
| Gold | Ding Ning; Li Xiaoxia; Liu Shiwen | (Brazil) 2016 Rio de Janeiro | Table tennis | Women's team |
| Gold | Zhao Shuai | (Brazil) 2016 Rio de Janeiro | Taekwondo | Men's 58 kg |
| Gold | Zheng Shuyin | (Brazil) 2016 Rio de Janeiro | Taekwondo | Women's +67 kg |
| Gold | China women's national volleyball team: Ding Xia; Gong Xiangyu; Hui Ruoqi; Lin Li; Liu Xiaotong; Wei Qiuyue; Xu Yunli; Yan Ni; Yang Fangxu; Yuan Xinyue; Zhang Changning; Zhu Ting | (Brazil) 2016 Rio de Janeiro | Volleyball | Women's tournament |
| Gold | Long Qingquan | (Brazil) 2016 Rio de Janeiro | Weightlifting | Men's 56 kg |
| Gold | Shi Zhiyong | (Brazil) 2016 Rio de Janeiro | Weightlifting | Men's 69 kg |
| Gold | Deng Wei | (Brazil) 2016 Rio de Janeiro | Weightlifting | Women's 63 kg |
| Gold | Xiang Yanmei | (Brazil) 2016 Rio de Janeiro | Weightlifting | Women's 69 kg |
| Gold | Meng Suping | (Brazil) 2016 Rio de Janeiro | Weightlifting | Women's +75 kg |
| Silver | Huang Xuechen; Sun Wenyan | (Brazil) 2016 Rio de Janeiro | Artistic swimming | Women's duet |
| Silver | Gu Xiao; Guo Li; Huang Xuechen; Li Xiaolu; Liang Xinping; Sun Wenyan; Tang Mengni; Yin Chengxin; Zeng Zhen | (Brazil) 2016 Rio de Janeiro | Artistic swimming | Women's team |
| Silver | Cai Zelin | (Brazil) 2016 Rio de Janeiro | Athletics | Men's 20 km walk |
| Silver | Zhang Wenxiu | (Brazil) 2016 Rio de Janeiro | Athletics | Women's hammer throw |
| Silver | He Zi | (Brazil) 2016 Rio de Janeiro | Diving | Women's 3 m springboard |
| Silver | Hao Jialu; Sun Yiwen; Sun Yujie; Xu Anqi | (Brazil) 2016 Rio de Janeiro | Fencing | Women's team épée |
| Silver | Du Li | (Brazil) 2016 Rio de Janeiro | Shooting | Women's 10 m air rifle |
| Silver | Zhang Binbin | (Brazil) 2016 Rio de Janeiro | Shooting | Women's 50 m rifle three positions |
| Silver | Sun Yang | (Brazil) 2016 Rio de Janeiro | Swimming | Men's 400 m freestyle |
| Silver | Xu Jiayu | (Brazil) 2016 Rio de Janeiro | Swimming | Men's 100 m backstroke |
| Silver | Zhang Jike | (Brazil) 2016 Rio de Janeiro | Table tennis | Men's singles |
| Silver | Li Xiaoxia | (Brazil) 2016 Rio de Janeiro | Table tennis | Women's singles |
| Silver | Dong Dong | (Brazil) 2016 Rio de Janeiro | Trampoline | Men's individual trampoline |
| Silver | Lü Xiaojun | (Brazil) 2016 Rio de Janeiro | Weightlifting | Men's 77 kg |
| Silver | Tian Tao | (Brazil) 2016 Rio de Janeiro | Weightlifting | Men's 85 kg |
| Bronze | Deng Shudi; Lin Chaopan; Liu Yang; You Hao; Zhang Chenglong | (Brazil) 2016 Rio de Janeiro | Artistic gymnastics | Men's team all-around |
| Bronze | Fan Yilin; Mao Yi; Shang Chunsong; Tan Jiaxin; Wang Yan | (Brazil) 2016 Rio de Janeiro | Artistic gymnastics | Women's team all-around |
| Bronze | Lü Xiuzhi | (Brazil) 2016 Rio de Janeiro | Athletics | Women's 20 km walk |
| Bronze | Zhang Nan; Zhao Yunlei | (Brazil) 2016 Rio de Janeiro | Badminton | Mixed doubles |
| Bronze | Sun Yiwen | (Brazil) 2016 Rio de Janeiro | Fencing | Women's individual épée |
| Bronze | Pang Wei | (Brazil) 2016 Rio de Janeiro | Shooting | Men's 10 m air pistol |
| Bronze | Li Yuehong | (Brazil) 2016 Rio de Janeiro | Shooting | Men's 25 m rapid fire pistol |
| Bronze | Yi Siling | (Brazil) 2016 Rio de Janeiro | Shooting | Women's 10 m air rifle |
| Bronze | Du Li | (Brazil) 2016 Rio de Janeiro | Shooting | Women's 50 m rifle three positions |
| Bronze | Wang Shun | (Brazil) 2016 Rio de Janeiro | Swimming | Men's 200 m individual medley |
| Bronze | Fu Yuanhui | (Brazil) 2016 Rio de Janeiro | Swimming | Women's 100 m backstroke |
| Bronze | Shi Jinglin | (Brazil) 2016 Rio de Janeiro | Swimming | Women's 200 m breaststroke |
| Bronze | Gao Lei | (Brazil) 2016 Rio de Janeiro | Trampoline | Men's individual trampoline |
| Bronze | Li Dan | (Brazil) 2016 Rio de Janeiro | Trampoline | Women's individual trampoline |
| Bronze | Sun Yanan | (Brazil) 2016 Rio de Janeiro | Wrestling | Flyweight, Freestyle, Women |
| Bronze | Zhang Fengliu | (Brazil) 2016 Rio de Janeiro | Wrestling | Heavyweight, Freestyle, Women |
| Gold | Zou Jingyuan | (Japan) 2020 Tokyo | Artistic gymnastics | Men's parallel bars |
| Gold | Liu Yang | (Japan) 2020 Tokyo | Artistic gymnastics | Men's rings |
| Gold | Guan Chenchen | (Japan) 2020 Tokyo | Artistic gymnastics | Women's balance beam |
| Gold | Liu Shiying | (Japan) 2020 Tokyo | Athletics | Women's javelin throw |
| Gold | Gong Lijiao | (Japan) 2020 Tokyo | Athletics | Women's shot put |
| Gold | Chen Yufei | (Japan) 2020 Tokyo | Badminton | Women's singles |
| Gold | Huang Dongping; Wang Yilyu | (Japan) 2020 Tokyo | Badminton | Mixed doubles |
| Gold | Sun Mengya; Xu Shixiao | (Japan) 2020 Tokyo | Canoeing | Women's C-2 500 m |
| Gold | Bao Shanju; Zhong Tianshi | (Japan) 2020 Tokyo | Cycling | Women's team sprint |
| Gold | Xie Siyi | (Japan) 2020 Tokyo | Diving | Men's 3 m springboard |
| Gold | Wang Zongyuan; Xie Siyi | (Japan) 2020 Tokyo | Diving | Men's 3 m synchronized springboard |
| Gold | Cao Yuan | (Japan) 2020 Tokyo | Diving | Men's 10 m platform |
| Gold | Shi Tingmao | (Japan) 2020 Tokyo | Diving | Women's 3 m springboard |
| Gold | Shi Tingmao; Wang Han | (Japan) 2020 Tokyo | Diving | Women's 3 m synchronized springboard |
| Gold | Quan Hongchan | (Japan) 2020 Tokyo | Diving | Women's 10 m platform |
| Gold | Chen Yuxi; Zhang Jiaqi | (Japan) 2020 Tokyo | Diving | Women's 10 m synchronized platform |
| Gold | Sun Yiwen | (Japan) 2020 Tokyo | Fencing | Women's individual épée |
| Gold | Chen Yunxia; Cui Xiaotong; Lü Yang; Zhang Ling | (Japan) 2020 Tokyo | Rowing | Women's quadruple sculls |
| Gold | Lu Yunxiu | (Japan) 2020 Tokyo | Sailing | Women's sailboard |
| Gold | Zhang Changhong | (Japan) 2020 Tokyo | Shooting | Men's 50 m rifle three positions |
| Gold | Yang Qian | (Japan) 2020 Tokyo | Shooting | Women's 10 m air rifle |
| Gold | Jiang Ranxin; Pang Wei | (Japan) 2020 Tokyo | Shooting | Mixed 10 m air pistol team |
| Gold | Yang Haoran; Yang Qian | (Japan) 2020 Tokyo | Shooting | Mixed 10 m air rifle team |
| Gold | Wang Shun | (Japan) 2020 Tokyo | Swimming | Men's 200 m medley |
| Gold | Zhang Yufei | (Japan) 2020 Tokyo | Swimming | Women's 200 m butterfly |
| Gold | Yang Junxuan; Tang Muhan; Zhang Yufei; Li Bingjie; Dong Jie; Zhang Yifan | (Japan) 2020 Tokyo | Swimming | Women's 4 × 200 m freestyle relay |
| Gold | Ma Long | (Japan) 2020 Tokyo | Table tennis | Men's singles |
| Gold | Fan Zhendong; Ma Long; Xu Xin | (Japan) 2020 Tokyo | Table tennis | Men's team |
| Gold | Chen Meng | (Japan) 2020 Tokyo | Table tennis | Women's singles |
| Gold | Chen Meng; Sun Yingsha; Wang Manyu | (Japan) 2020 Tokyo | Table tennis | Women's team |
| Gold | Zhu Xueying | (Japan) 2020 Tokyo | Trampoline | Women's individual trampoline |
| Gold | Li Fabin | (Japan) 2020 Tokyo | Weightlifting | Men's 61 kg |
| Gold | Chen Lijun | (Japan) 2020 Tokyo | Weightlifting | Men's 67 kg |
| Gold | Shi Zhiyong | (Japan) 2020 Tokyo | Weightlifting | Men's 73 kg |
| Gold | Lü Xiaojun | (Japan) 2020 Tokyo | Weightlifting | Men's 81 kg |
| Gold | Hou Zhihui | (Japan) 2020 Tokyo | Weightlifting | Women's 49 kg |
| Gold | Wang Zhouyu | (Japan) 2020 Tokyo | Weightlifting | Women's 87 kg |
| Gold | Li Wenwen | (Japan) 2020 Tokyo | Weightlifting | Women's +87 kg |
| Silver | Xiao Ruoteng | (Japan) 2020 Tokyo | Artistic gymnastics | Men's individual all-around |
| Silver | You Hao | (Japan) 2020 Tokyo | Artistic gymnastics | Men's rings |
| Silver | Tang Xijing | (Japan) 2020 Tokyo | Artistic gymnastics | Women's balance beam |
| Silver | Huang Xuechen; Sun Wenyan | (Japan) 2020 Tokyo | Artistic swimming | Women's duet |
| Silver | Feng Yu; Guo Li; Huang Xuechen; Liang Xinping; Sun Wenyan; Wang Qianyi; Xiao Yanning; Yin Chengxin | (Japan) 2020 Tokyo | Artistic swimming | Women's team |
| Silver | Zhu Yaming | (Japan) 2020 Tokyo | Athletics | Men's triple jump |
| Silver | Wang Zheng | (Japan) 2020 Tokyo | Athletics | Women's hammer throw |
| Silver | Chen Long | (Japan) 2020 Tokyo | Badminton | Men's singles |
| Silver | Li Junhui; Liu Yuchen | (Japan) 2020 Tokyo | Badminton | Men's doubles |
| Silver | Chen Qingchen; Jia Yifan | (Japan) 2020 Tokyo | Badminton | Women's doubles |
| Silver | Huang Yaqiong; Zheng Siwei | (Japan) 2020 Tokyo | Badminton | Mixed doubles |
| Silver | Gu Hong | (Japan) 2020 Tokyo | Boxing | Women's welterweight |
| Silver | Li Qian | (Japan) 2020 Tokyo | Boxing | Women's welterweight |
| Silver | Liu Hao | (Japan) 2020 Tokyo | Canoeing | Men's C-1 1000 m |
| Silver | Liu Hao; Zheng Pengfei | (Japan) 2020 Tokyo | Canoeing | Men's C-2 1000 m |
| Silver | Wang Zongyuan | (Japan) 2020 Tokyo | Diving | Men's 3 m springboard |
| Silver | Yang Jian | (Japan) 2020 Tokyo | Diving | Men's 10 m platform |
| Silver | Cao Yuan; Chen Aisen | (Japan) 2020 Tokyo | Diving | Men's synchronized 10 m platform |
| Silver | Wang Han | (Japan) 2020 Tokyo | Diving | Women's 3 m springboard |
| Silver | Chen Yuxi | (Japan) 2020 Tokyo | Diving | Women's 10 m platform |
| Silver | Yin Xiaoyan | (Japan) 2020 Tokyo | Karate | Women's 61 kg |
| Silver | Sheng Lihao | (Japan) 2020 Tokyo | Shooting | Men's 10 m air rifle |
| Silver | Zhang Yufei | (Japan) 2020 Tokyo | Swimming | Women's 100 m butterfly |
| Silver | Xu Jiayu; Yan Zibei; Yang Junxuan; Zhang Yufei | (Japan) 2020 Tokyo | Swimming | Mixed 4 × 100 m medley relay |
| Silver | Fan Zhendong | (Japan) 2020 Tokyo | Table tennis | Men's singles |
| Silver | Sun Yingsha | (Japan) 2020 Tokyo | Table tennis | Women's singles |
| Silver | Liu Shiwen; Xu Xin | (Japan) 2020 Tokyo | Table tennis | Mixed doubles |
| Silver | Dong Dong | (Japan) 2020 Tokyo | Trampoline | Men's individual trampoline |
| Silver | Liu Lingling | (Japan) 2020 Tokyo | Trampoline | Women's individual trampoline |
| Silver | Liao Qiuyun | (Japan) 2020 Tokyo | Weightlifting | Women's 55 kg |
| Silver | Sun Yanan | (Japan) 2020 Tokyo | Wrestling | Women's freestyle 50 kg |
| Silver | Pang Qianyu | (Japan) 2020 Tokyo | Wrestling | Women's freestyle 53 kg |
| Bronze | Xiao Ruoteng | (Japan) 2020 Tokyo | Artistic gymnastics | Men's floor |
| Bronze | Liu Hong | (Japan) 2020 Tokyo | Athletics | Women's 20 km walk |
| Bronze | Bi Kun | (Japan) 2020 Tokyo | Sailing | Men's sailboard |
| Bronze | Pang Wei | (Japan) 2020 Tokyo | Shooting | - |
| Bronze | Li Yuehong | (Japan) 2020 Tokyo | Shooting | Men's 25 m rapid fire pistol |
| Bronze | Yang Haoran | (Japan) 2020 Tokyo | Shooting | Men's 10 m air rifle |
| Bronze | Jiang Ranxin | (Japan) 2020 Tokyo | Shooting | Women's 10 m air pistol |
| Bronze | Li Bingjie | (Japan) 2020 Tokyo | Swimming | Women's 400 m freestyle |
| Bronze | Walihan Sailike | (Japan) 2020 Tokyo | Wrestling | Men's Greco-Roman 60 kg |
| Bronze | Zhou Qian | (Japan) 2020 Tokyo | Wrestling | Women's freestyle 76 kg |

== Winter Olympics ==
| Medal | Name | Games | Sport | Event |
|---|---|---|---|---|
| Silver | Li Yan | (France) 1992 Albertville | Short track speed skating | Women's 500m |
| Silver | Ye Qiaobo | (France) 1992 Albertville | Speed skating | Women's 500m |
| Silver | Ye Qiaobo | (France) 1992 Albertville | Speed skating | Women's 1000m |
| Silver | Zhang Yanmei | (Norway) 1994 Lillehammer | Short track speed skating | Women's 500m |
| Bronze | Chen Lu | (Norway) 1994 Lillehammer | Figure skating | Ladies' singles |
| Bronze | Ye Qiaobo | (Norway) 1994 Lillehammer | Speed skating | Women's 1000m |
| Silver | Xu Nannan | (Japan) 1998 Nagano | Freestyle skiing | Women's aerials |
| Silver | An Yulong | (Japan) 1998 Nagano | Short track speed skating | Men's 500m |
| Silver | Li Jiajun | (Japan) 1998 Nagano | Short track speed skating | Men's 1000m |
| Silver | Yang Yang (S) | (Japan) 1998 Nagano | Short track speed skating | Women's 500m |
| Silver | Yang Yang (S) | (Japan) 1998 Nagano | Short track speed skating | Women's 1000m |
| Silver | Yang Yang (A); Yang Yang (S); Wang Chunlu; Sun Dandan | (Japan) 1998 Nagano | Short track speed skating | Women's 3000m relay |
| Bronze | Chen Lu | (Japan) 1998 Nagano | Figure skating | Ladies' singles |
| Bronze | Li Jiajun; Feng Kai; Yuan Ye; An Yulong | (Japan) 1998 Nagano | Short track speed skating | Men's 5000m relay |
| Gold | Yang Yang (A) | (United States) 2002 Salt Lake City | Short track speed skating | Women's 500m |
| Gold | Yang Yang (A) | (United States) 2002 Salt Lake City | Short track speed skating | Women's 1000m |
| Silver | Li Jiajun | (United States) 2002 Salt Lake City | Short track speed skating | Men's 1500m |
| Silver | Yang Yang (A); Yang Yang (S); Wang Chunlu; Sun Dandan | (United States) 2002 Salt Lake City | Short track speed skating | Women's 3000m relay |
| Bronze | Shen Xue; Zhao Hongbo | (United States) 2002 Salt Lake City | Figure skating | Pair skating |
| Bronze | Wang Chunlu | (United States) 2002 Salt Lake City | Short track speed skating | Women's 500m |
| Bronze | Yang Yang (S) | (United States) 2002 Salt Lake City | Short track speed skating | Women's 1000m |
| Bronze | Li Jiajun; An Yulong; Li Ye; Feng Kai; Guo Wei | (United States) 2002 Salt Lake City | Short track speed skating | Men's 5000m relay |
| Gold | Han Xiaopeng | (Italy) 2006 Turin | Freestyle skiing | Men's aerials |
| Gold | Wang Meng | (Italy) 2006 Turin | Short track speed skating | Women's 500m |
| Silver | Zhang Dan; Zhang Hao | (Italy) 2006 Turin | Figure skating | Pair skating |
| Silver | Li Nina | (Italy) 2006 Turin | Freestyle skiing | Women's aerials |
| Silver | Wang Manli | (Italy) 2006 Turin | Short track speed skating | Women's 500m |
| Silver | Wang Meng | (Italy) 2006 Turin | Short track speed skating | Women's 1000m |
| Bronze | Shen Xue; Zhao Hongbo | (Italy) 2006 Turin | Figure skating | Pair skating |
| Bronze | Li Jiajun | (Italy) 2006 Turin | Short track speed skating | Men's 1500m |
| Bronze | Yang Yang (A) | (Italy) 2006 Turin | Short track speed skating | Women's 1000m |
| Bronze | Wang Meng | (Italy) 2006 Turin | Short track speed skating | Women's 1500m |
| Bronze | Ren Hui | (Italy) 2006 Turin | Speed skating | Women's 500m |
| Gold | Shen Xue; Zhao Hongbo | (Canada) 2010 Vancouver | Figure skating | Pair skating |
| Gold | Wang Meng | (Canada) 2010 Vancouver | Short track speed skating | Women's 500m |
| Gold | Wang Meng | (Canada) 2010 Vancouver | Short track speed skating | Women's 1000m |
| Gold | Zhou Yang | (Canada) 2010 Vancouver | Short track speed skating | Women's 1500m |
| Gold | Sun Linlin; Wang Meng; Zhang Hui; Zhou Yang | (Canada) 2010 Vancouver | Short track speed skating | Women's 3000m relay |
| Silver | Pang Qing; Tong Jian | (Canada) 2010 Vancouver | Figure skating | Pair skating |
| Silver | Li Nina | (Canada) 2010 Vancouver | Freestyle skiing | Women's aerials |
| Bronze | Wang Bingyu; Liu Yin; Yue Qingshuang; Zhou Yan; Liu Jinli | (Canada) 2010 Vancouver | Curling | Women's tournament |
| Bronze | Liu Zhongqing | (Canada) 2010 Vancouver | Freestyle skiing | Men's aerials |
| Bronze | Guo Xinxin | (Canada) 2010 Vancouver | Freestyle skiing | Women's aerials |
| Bronze | Wang Beixing | (Canada) 2010 Vancouver | Speed skating | Women's 500m |
| Gold | Li Jianrou | (Russia) 2014 Sochi | Short track speed skating | Women's 500m |
| Gold | Zhou Yang | (Russia) 2014 Sochi | Short track speed skating | Women's 1500m |
| Gold | Zhang Hong | (Russia) 2014 Sochi | Speed skating | Women's 1000m |
| Silver | Xu Mengtao | (Russia) 2014 Sochi | Freestyle skiing | Women's aerials |
| Silver | Wu Dajing | (Russia) 2014 Sochi | Short track speed skating | Men's 500m |
| Silver | Han Tianyu | (Russia) 2014 Sochi | Short track speed skating | Men's 1500m |
| Silver | Fan Kexin | (Russia) 2014 Sochi | Short track speed skating | Women's 1000m |
| Bronze | Jia Zongyang | (Russia) 2014 Sochi | Freestyle skiing | Men's aerials |
| Bronze | Chen Dequan; Han Tianyu; Shi Jingnan; Wu Dajing | (Russia) 2014 Sochi | Short track speed skating | Men's 5000m relay |
| Gold | Wu Dajing | (South Korea) 2018 PyeongChang | Short track speed skating | Men's 500m |
| Silver | Liu Jiayu | (South Korea) 2018 PyeongChang | Snowboarding | Women's halfpipe |
| Silver | Sui Wenjing; Han Cong | (South Korea) 2018 PyeongChang | Figure skating | Pairs |
| Silver | Zhang Xin | (South Korea) 2018 PyeongChang | Freestyle skiing | Women's aerials |
| Silver | Li Jinyu | (South Korea) 2018 PyeongChang | Short track speed skating | Women's 1500m |
| Silver | Jia Zongyang | (South Korea) 2018 PyeongChang | Freestyle skiing | Men's aerials |
| Silver | Chen Dequan; Han Tianyu; Wu Dajing; Xu Hongzhi | (South Korea) 2018 PyeongChang | Short track speed skating | Men's 5000m relay |
| Bronze | Kong Fanyu | (South Korea) 2018 PyeongChang | Freestyle skiing | Women's aerials |
| Bronze | Gao Tingyu | (South Korea) 2018 PyeongChang | Speed skating | Men's 500m |
