= Gymnastics at the 1996 Summer Olympics – Men's parallel bars =

Olympic gymnastics event

Men's parallel bars at the Games of the XXVI Olympiad
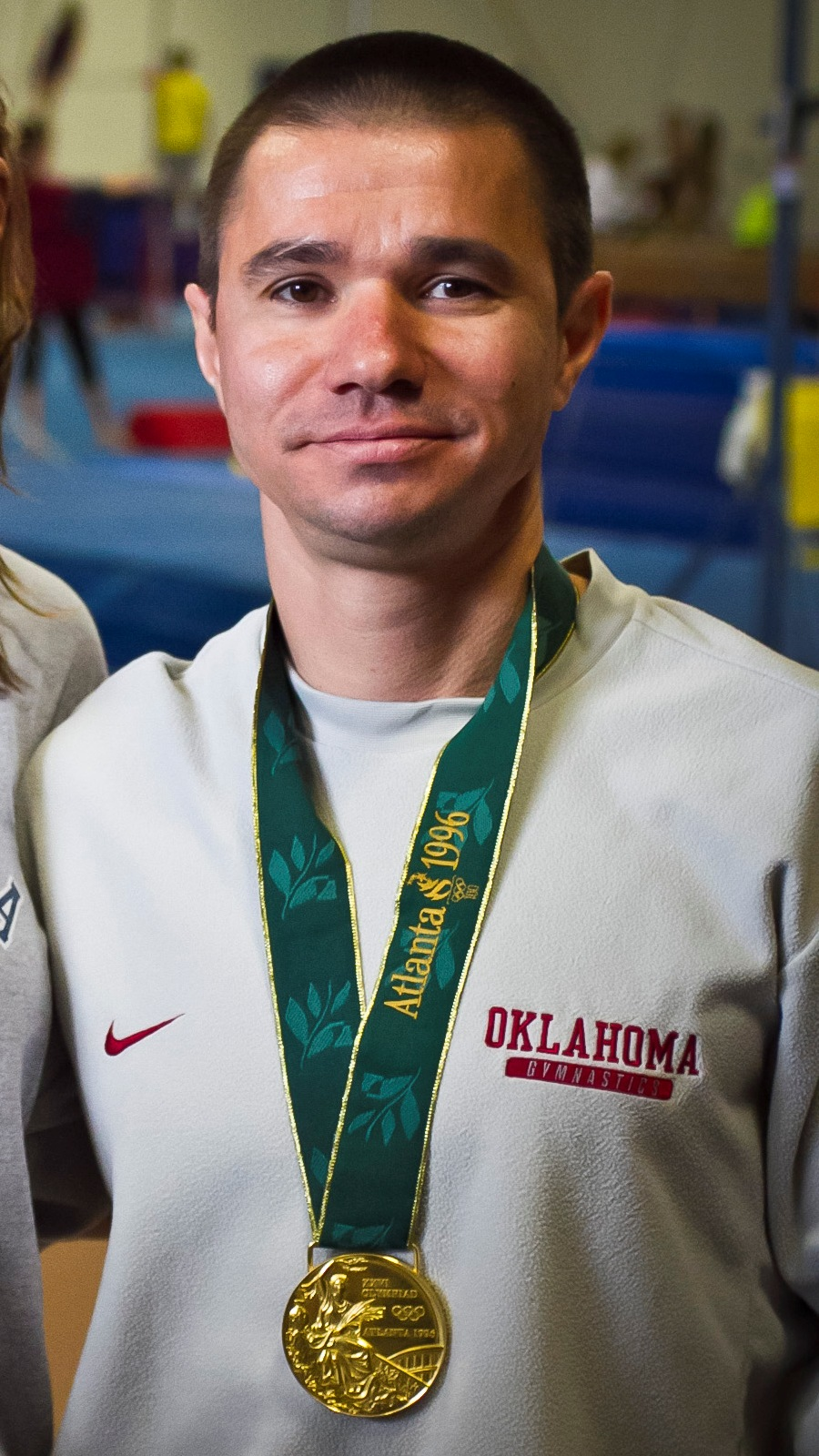
- Rustam Sharipov (2011)
- Venue: Georgia Dome
- Dates: 20–29 July 1996
- Competitors: 106 from 31 nations
- Winning score: 9.837

Medalists
| 1st place, gold medalist(s) | | Rustam Sharipov; Ukraine |
| 2nd place, silver medalist(s) | | Jair Lynch; United States |
| 3rd place, bronze medalist(s) | | Vitaly Scherbo; Belarus |

The men's parallel bars competition was one of eight events for male competitors in artistic gymnastics at the 1996 Summer Olympics in Atlanta. The qualification and final rounds took place on July 20, 22 and 29th at the Georgia Dome. There were 106 competitors from 31 nations, with nations in the team event having up to 7 gymnasts (under the "7-6-5" system unique to 1996, teams had 7 gymnasts, designated 6 for each apparatus with 5 to count; However, all 7 could compete on each apparatus for individual purposes) and other nations having up to 3 gymnasts. The event was won by Rustam Sharipov of Ukraine, the nation's first victory in the men's parallel bars after the dissolution of the Soviet Union. Jair Lynch earned the United States' first medal in the event since 1984 with his silver. Defending champion Vitaly Scherbo earned bronze for Belarus. He was the sixth man to win multiple medals in the parallel bars.

== Background ==
This was the 19th appearance of the event, which is one of the five apparatus events held every time there were apparatus events at the Summer Olympics (no apparatus events were held in 1900, 1908, 1912, or 1920). Six of the eight finalists from 1992 returned: gold medalist Vitaly Scherbo of the Unified Team (now competing for Belarus), bronze medalist Ihor Korobchynskyi of the Unified Team (now competing for Ukraine), sixth-place finisher Jair Lynch of the United States, and seventh-place finisher Andreas Wecker of Germany. In the four world championships since the 1992 Games, Scherbo had won twice (1993 and 1995) and finished second and sixth. The 1996 world champion was Rustam Sharipov of Russia, who had also recorded one second-place and two fourth-place finishes in the last four years. Huang Liping of China was the 1994 world champion (and 1995 runner-up). Scherbo was the favorite, but the field was strong.

Armenia, Barbados, Belarus, Croatia, the Czech Republic, Georgia, Iceland, Ireland, Kazakhstan, Russia, and Ukraine each made their debut in the men's parallel bars. Greece competed for the first time since 1896. The United States made its 17th appearance, most of any nation; the Americans had missed only the inaugural 1896 event and the boycotted 1980 Games.

== Competition format ==
The 1996 gymnastics competition introduced the "7–6–5" format, in which each team had 7 members, designated 6 for each apparatus, and had 5 count for team scores. However, all 7 could compete on each apparatus for individual competition purposes. Other nations could enter up to 3 individual gymnasts. All entrants in the gymnastics competitions performed both a compulsory exercise and a voluntary exercise for each apparatus (except for any apparatus in which a team member was not competing). The scores for all 12 exercises were summed to give an individual all-around qualifying score for those gymnasts competing on every apparatus. These exercise scores were also used for qualification for the apparatus finals. The two exercises (compulsory and voluntary) for each apparatus were summed to give an apparatus score. The top eight gymnasts, with a limit of two per nation, advanced to the final. Non-finalists were ranked 9th through 106th based on preliminary score. The preliminary score had no effect on the final; once the eight finalists were selected, their ranking depended only on the final exercise.

== Schedule ==
All times are Eastern Daylight Time (UTC-4)

| Date | Time | Round |
|---|---|---|
| Saturday, 20 July 1996 | | Preliminary: Compulsory |
| Monday, 22 July 1996 | | Preliminary: Voluntary |
| Monday, 29 July 1996 | 21:45 | Final |

== Results ==
=== Qualifying ===
106 gymnasts competed in the parallel bars event during the compulsory and optional rounds on July 20 and 22. The eight highest scoring gymnasts advanced to the final on July 29. Each country was limited to two competitors in the final.

=== Final ===
| Rank | Gymnast | Nation | Score |
|---|---|---|---|
| 1st place, gold medalist(s) | Rustam Sharipov | Ukraine | 9.837 |
| 2nd place, silver medalist(s) | Jair Lynch | United States | 9.825 |
| 3rd place, bronze medalist(s) | Vitaly Scherbo | Belarus | 9.800 |
| 4 | Zhang Jinjing | China | 9.750 |
| 4 | Alexei Nemov | Russia | 9.750 |
| 6 | Huang Liping | China | 9.737 |
| 7 | Lee Joo-Hyung | South Korea | 9.687 |
| 8 | Sergei Kharkov | Russia | 9.650 |
