= Guo Linhong =

Chinese gymnast

- Full name: Guo Linhong
- Nickname: Coach Anna
- Born: January 2, 1968 (age 58)

Gymnastics career
- Discipline: Women's artistic gymnastics
- Country represented: China
- Club: World Elite Gymnastics

Guo Linhong (Chinese: 国林红; born January 2, 1968, in Harbin) is a former artistic gymnast from China.

== Family ==
Guo was born into a well-known gymnastics family in China, whose members have collectively won 140 national and international titles in the sport. Both her mother, Suo Huiqi, and her father, Guo Shuzeng, were members of the Chinese national team. She has two older brothers, Guo Linsheng and Guo Linxian, and one younger brother, Guo Linyao, all of whom competed internationally in gymnastics.

== Gymnastics career ==
Guo was hand-picked to attend Beijing's Ba-Yi gymnastics training center at a young age, and she competed from 1977 to 1990. In 1982, she won the all-around and vault titles at an invitational in Finland, as well as the all-around, vault, uneven bars and balance beam titles at the Northern Star International Gymnastics Invitational. She was the vault champion at the 1983 and 1987 National Gymnastics Championships.

After retiring from competition, she became a gymnastics coach. She moved to the United States in 2001 and coached at Le Club Gymnastics in the Chatsworth neighborhood of Los Angeles (2001–02), Payke Gymnastics in Alhambra, California (2003–07), and West Coast Elite Gymnastics in Arcadia (2007–15). She is now the head coach of World Elite Gymnastics in Ontario, California.
