= China men's national artistic gymnastics team =

Gymnastics team representing China

China Men's National Gymnastics Team
- Continental union: Asian Gymnastics Union
- National federation: Chinese Gymnastics Association

Olympic Games
- Appearances: 10
- Medals: Gold: 2000, 2008, 2012 Silver: 1984, 1992, 1996, 2024; Bronze: 2016, 2020

World Championships
- Appearances: 24
- Medals: Gold: 1983, 1994, 1995, 1997, 1999, 2003, 2006, 2007, 2010, 2011, 2014, 2018, 2022; Silver: 1985, 1987, 1991, 2019, 2023; Bronze: 1981, 1989, 2015, 2026

Asian Games
- Appearances: 14
- Medals: Gold: 1974, 1978, 1982, 1986, 1990, 1994, 1998, 2002, 2006, 2010, 2018, 2022, 2026; Silver: Bronze: 2014

Junior World Championships
- Appearances: 3
- Medals: Gold: 2025; Silver: 2023

The China men's national artistic gymnastics team represents China in FIG international competitions.

== History ==
China made their World Championships debut at the 1958 World Championships. At the 1962 World Championships, Yu Lifeng won bronze on pommel horse, becoming the first male Chinese gymnast to win a World Championships medal. At the 1981 World Championships, Li Yuejiu and Li Xiaoping became the first Chinese male gymnasts to become World Champions, winning gold on floor exercise and pommel horse respectively. At the following World Championships China won their first team gold medal.

The Chinese Olympic Committee sent their first full athletic delegation to the 1984 Summer Olympics, where the men's gymnastics team won the silver medal behind the United States. Individually Li Ning won three gold medals at these Games while Lou Yun also won an individual gold.

== Team Competition Results ==
=== Olympic Games ===
- 1896 through 1980 — did not participate

Year	Position	Squad
1984	silver medal	Li Ning, Li Xiaoping, Li Yuejiu, Lou Yun, Tong Fei, Xu Zhiqiang
1988	4th place	Wang Chongsheng, Lou Yun, Xu Zhiqiang, Guo Linxian, Li Chunyang, Li Ning
1992	silver medal	Guo Linyao, Li Chunyang, Li Dashuang, Li Ge, Li Jing, Li Xiaoshuang
1996	silver medal	Fan Bin, Fan Hongbin, Huang Huadong, Huang Liping, Li Xiaoshuang, Shen Jian, Zhang Jinjing
2000	gold medal	Huang Xu, Li Xiaopeng, Xiao Junfeng, Xing Aowei, Yang Wei, Zheng Lihui
2004	5th place	Huang Xu, Li Xiaopeng, Teng Haibin, Xiao Qin, Xing Aowei, Yang Wei
2008	gold medal	Huang Xu, Chen Yibing, Li Xiaopeng, Xiao Qin, Yang Wei, Zou Kai
2012	gold medal	Chen Yibing, Feng Zhe, Guo Weiyang, Zhang Chenglong, Zou Kai
2016	bronze medal	Deng Shudi, Lin Chaopan, Liu Yang, You Hao, Zhang Chenglong
2020	bronze medal	Lin Chaopan, Sun Wei, Xiao Ruoteng, Zou Jingyuan
2024	silver medal	Liu Yang, Su Weide, Xiao Ruoteng, Zhang Boheng, Zou Jingyuan

=== World Championships ===
China did not participate at the World Championships between 1903–1954, with their first appearance being in 1958. Additionally they stopped competing after the 1962 World Championships due to the International Gymnastics Federation accepting Taiwan as a member nation. They returned in 1979.

Year	Position	Squad
1958	11th place	Pao Naichen, Wu Shuten, Yu Lifeng, Hsu Jenchen, Yang Chenmin, Zhao Tenin
1962	4th place	Yu Lifeng, Yeh Yita, Chang Chen, Liao Juntien, Hsu Taiming, Feng Taichun
1979	5th place	Huang Yubin, Cai Huanzong, Li Yuejiu, Tong Fei, Peng Yaping, Xiong Songliang
1981	bronze medal	Tong Fei, Li Ning, Li Xiaoping, Huang Yubin, Peng Yaping, Li Yuejiu
1983	gold medal	Tong Fei, Li Ning, Lou Yun, Xu Zhiqiang, Li Xiaoping, Li Yuejiu
1985	silver medal	Li Ning, Xu Zhiqiang, Tong Fei, Lou Yun, Yang Yueshan, Zou Limin
1987	silver medal	Xu Zhiqiang, Lou Yun, Wang Chongsheng, Guo Linxiang, Li Chunyang, Li Ning
1989	bronze medal	Li Chunyang, Li Jing, Ma Zheng, Li Ge, Guo Linxiang, Wang Chongsheng,
1991	silver medal	Li Jing, Li Chunyang, Huang Huadong, Guo Linyao, Li Xiaoshuang, Li Ge
1994	gold medal	Fan Hongbin, Guo Linyao, Huang Huadong, Huang Liping, Li Dashuang, Li Xiaoshuang, Li Jing
1995	gold medal	Fan Bin, Huang Huadong, Huang Liping, Li Xiaoshuang, Zhang Jinjing, Shen Jian, Fan Hongbin
1997	gold medal	Shen Jian, Li Xiaopeng, Huang Xu, Lu Yufu, Xiao Junfeng, Zhang Jinjing
1999	gold medal	Dong Zhen, Huang Xu, Li Xiaopeng, Lu Yufu, Xing Aowei, Yang Wei
2001	5th place	Deng Weiwei, Feng Jing, Li Rongjie, Liu Jinyu, Xiao Qin, Zhang Shangwu
2003	gold medal	Huang Xu, Li Xiaopeng, Teng Haibin, Xiao Qin, Xing Aowei, Yang Wei
2006	gold medal	Chen Yibing, Feng Jing, Liang Fuliang, Xiao Qin, Yang Wei, Zou Kai
2007	gold medal	Chen Yibing, Huang Xu, Liang Fuliang, Xiao Qin, Yang Wei, Zou Kai
2010	gold medal	Chen Yibing, Feng Zhe, Lü Bo, Teng Haibin, Yan Mingyong, Zhang Chenglong
2011	gold medal	Chen Yibing, Feng Zhe, Guo Weiyang, Teng Haibin, Zhang Chenglong, Zou Kai
2014	gold medal	Cheng Ran, Deng Shudi, Lin Chaopan, Liu Yang, You Hao, Zhang Chenglong, Liu Rongbing*
2015	bronze medal	Deng Shudi, Lin Chaopan, Liu Yang, Xiao Ruoteng, You Hao, Zhang Chenglong, Liu Rongbing*
2018	gold medal	Deng Shudi, Lin Chaopan, Sun Wei, Xiao Ruoteng, Zou Jingyuan, Lan Xingyu*
2019	silver medal	Deng Shudi, Lin Chaopan, Sun Wei, Xiao Ruoteng, Zou Jingyuan, You Hao*
2022	gold medal	Sun Wei, Yang Jiaxing, You Hao, Zhang Boheng, Zou Jingyuan, Su Weide*
2023	silver medal	Lin Chaopan, Liu Yang, Su Weide, Sun Wei, You Hao, Shi Cong
2026	bronze medal	Lan Xingyu, Li Hongyan, Tian Hao, Yang Haonan, Zou Jingyuan, Hong Yanming

=== Asian Games ===
Year	Position	Squad
1974	gold medal	Cai Huanzong, Liao Runtian, Pan Chenfei, Wu Shoude, Yang Mingming, Zhao Jiawei
1978	gold medal	Cai Huanzong, Huang Yubin, Li Yuejiu, Pan Chenfei, Peng Yaping, Xiong Songliang
1982	gold medal	Huang Yubin, Li Ning, Li Xiaoping, Li Yuejiu, Lou Yun, Tong Fei
1986	gold medal	Guo Linsheng, Li Ning, Lou Yun, Wang Chongsheng, Xu Zhiqiang, Yang Yueshan
1990	gold medal	Guo Linyao, Li Chunyang, Li Ge, Li Jing, Li Xiaoshuang, Qiao Liang
1994	gold medal	Fan Hongbin, Guo Linyao, Huang Huadong, Huang Liping, Li Dashuang, Li Jing, Li Xiaoshuang
1998	gold medal	Huang Xu, Li Xiaopeng, Xing Aowei, Yang Wei, Zhang Jinjing, Zhao Sheng
2002	gold medal	Feng Jing, Huang Xu, Li Xiaopeng, Liang Fuliang, Teng Haibin, Yang Wei
2006	gold medal	Chen Yibing, Feng Jing, Liang Fuliang, Xiao Qin, Yang Wei, Zou Kai
2010	gold medal	Chen Yibing, Feng Zhe, Lü Bo, Teng Haibin, Yan Mingyong, Zhang Chenglong
2014	bronze medal	Huang Xi, Huang Yuguo, Liao Junlin, Wang Peng, Yang Shengchao, Zou Kai
2018	gold medal	Deng Shudi, Lin Chaopan, Sun Wei, Xiao Ruoteng, Zou Jingyuan
2022	gold medal	Lan Xingyu, Lin Chaopan, Xiao Ruoteng, Zhang Boheng, Zou Jingyuan
2026	gold medal	Lan Xingyu, Sun Wei, Tian Hao, Zhang Boheng, Zou Jingyuan

=== Junior World Championships ===
Year	Position	Squad
2019	4th place	Li Hongyan, Yang Haonan, Yang Yanzhi
2023	silver medal	He Xiang, Qin Guohuan, Yang Chunjie
2025	gold medal	Wang Chengcheng, Yang Lanbin, Zheng Ao

== Most Decorated Gymnasts ==
Rank	Gymnast	Years	Team	AA	FX	PH	SR	VT	PB	HB	Olympic Total	World Total	Total
1	Li Ning	1981–1988	1981; 1983; 1984; 1985; 1987	1984	1983; 1984; 1985	1984; 1985	1983; 1984; 1985; 1987	1983; 1984			6	11	17
2	Li Xiaopeng	1997–2008	1997; 1999; 2000; 2003; 2008		1997			1999; 2002; 2003	1997; 2000; 2002; 2003; 2004; 2005; 2008		5	11	16
3	Yang Wei	1999–2008	1999; 2000; 2003; 2006; 2007; 2008	2000; 2003; 2006; 2007; 2008			2008	2002	2006	1999	5	10	15
4	Zou Jingyuan	2017–2026	2024; 2020; 2018; 2022; 2019; 2026				2024; 2022		2020; 2024; 2017; 2018; 2022; 2025; 2026		5	10	15
5	Li Jing	1989–1994	1989; 1991; 1992; 1994	1989		1989; 1991; 1992	1992		1989; 1991; 1992; 1992	1992	3	11	14
5	Zou Kai	2006–2012	2006; 2007; 2008; 2011; 2012		2008; 2009; 2011; 2012					2008; 2009; 2011; 2012	6	7	13
7	Lou Yun	1983-1988	1983; 1984; 1985; 1987	1983	1984; 1987; 1988			1984; 1985; 1987; 1988	1983		5	8	13
8	Xiao Ruoteng	2015–2024	2015; 2018; 2019; 2020; 2024	2017; 2018; 2020 2024	2019; 2020	2017; 2018					5	8	13
9	Chen Yibing	2005–2012	2006; 2007; 2008; 2010; 2011; 2012				2006; 2007; 2008; 2010; 2011; 2012				4	8	12
11	Li Xiaoshuang	1991-1996	1991; 1992; 1994; 1995; 1996	1995; 1996	1992; 1995; 1996		1992	1994			6	6	12
12	Liu Yang	2013–2024	2014; 2015; 2016; 2023; 2024				2014; 2015; 2017; 2020; 2023; 2024				4	7	11
13	Xiao Qin	2001-2008	2003; 2006; 2007; 2008			2001; 2002; 2005; 2006; 2007; 2008					2	8	10
14	Zhang Chenglong	2010–2017	2010; 2011; 2012; 2014; 2015; 2016						2011	2010; 2011	2	7	9
14	Tong Fei	1979-1985	1981; 1983; 1984; 1985		1983; 1985				1983	1984; 1985	2	7	9
16	Lin Chaopan	2013–2023	2014; 2015; 2016; 2018; 2019; 2020; 2023	2017					2013		2	7	9
17	You Hao	2013–2022	2014; 2015; 2016; 2022				2014; 2015; 2020		2015		2	6	8
18	Huang Xu	1997–2008	1997; 1999; 2000; 2003; 2007; 2008						2003		2	5	7
19	Zhang Boheng	2021–2025	2024; 2022	2024; 2021; 2022; 2025						2024	3	4	7
20	Li Chunyang	1987-1992	1987; 1989; 1991; 1992		1989					1989; 1991	1	6	7
21	Deng Shudi	2014–2019	2014; 2015; 2016; 2018; 2019	2015					2015		1	6	7
22	Teng Haibin	2002–2011	2003; 2010; 2011			2003; 2004			2010		1	5	6
23	Feng Zhe	2009–2012	2010; 2011; 2012						2009; 2010; 2012		2	4	6
24	Guo Linyao	1991–1994	1991; 1992; 1994			1991			1991; 1992		2	4	6
25	Huang Liping	1993-1996	1994; 1995; 1996						1994; 1995		1	4	5
26	Zhang Jinjing	1995-1997	1995; 1996; 1997						1997	1995	1	4	5
27	Huang Huadong	1991–1996	1996; 1994; 1995; 1991			1995					1	4	5
28	Li Xiaoping	1981–1984	1984; 1983; 1981			1981; 1983					1	4	5
28	Sun Wei	2018–2023	2020; 2018; 2022; 2019; 2023								1	4	5

== See also ==
- China women's national gymnastics team
