= Dong Zhen (gymnast) =

Chinese artistic gymnast

- Born: 2 February 1977 (age 49)

Gymnastics career
- Country represented: China
Medal record
Representing China
World Championships
Gold medal – first place	1999 Tianjin	Rings
Gold medal – first place	1999 Tianjin	Team
National Games
Gold medal – first place	2001 Guangzhou	Rings
Silver medal – second place	2005 Nanjing	Rings

Dong Zhen (Chinese: 董震; pinyin: Dǒng zhèn; born 2 February 1977) is a retired Chinese artistic gymnast. He competed at the 1999 World Artistic Gymnastics Championships in his hometown of Tianjin and won gold, becoming world champion in the still rings event. He was also a part of the Chinese team which won the team competition at that same World Championships.
