= Feng Zhe =

Chinese artistic gymnast (born 1987)

- Born: 19 November 1987 (age 38) Chengdu, Sichuan, China
- Height: 160 cm (5 ft 3 in)

Gymnastics career
- Discipline: Men's artistic gymnastics
- Country represented: China
- Head coach: Huang Yubin
- Assistant coach: Wang Hongwei
Medal record
Olympic Games
Gold medal – first place	2012 London	Team
Gold medal – first place	2012 London	Parallel bars
World Championships
Gold medal – first place	2010 Rotterdam	Team
Gold medal – first place	2010 Rotterdam	Parallel bars
Gold medal – first place	2011 Tokyo	Team
Silver medal – second place	2009 London	Parallel bars
World Cup Final
Gold medal – first place	2008 Madrid	Parallel bars
Asian Games
Gold medal – first place	2010 Guangzhou	Team
Gold medal – first place	2010 Guangzhou	Parallel bars
Silver medal – second place	2010 Guangzhou	Vault

Feng Zhe (simplified Chinese: 冯喆; traditional Chinese: 馮喆; pinyin: Féng Zhé; born 19 November 1987) is a Chinese gymnast. He is the 2010 World champion and the 2012 Olympic champion on the parallel bars. He was also part of the Chinese teams that won the team gold at the 2012 Summer Olympics, the 2010 World Championships, and the 2011 World Championships. Additionally, he is the 2008 World Cup Final parallel bars champion and the 2010 Asian Games parallel bars champion and vault silver medalist.

== Gymnastics career ==
Feng began training in gymnastics at the age of three, and at sixteen, he was invited to join the national team.

Feng began competing in senior international competitions in 2005 and won a silver medal on the parallel bars at the 2005 Stuttgart World Cup. The same year, he won silver medals on both the vault and the parallel bars at the Glasgow World Cup. At the 2006 Cottbus World Cup, he won a parallel bars silver medal, behind World champion Mitja Petkovšek.

At the 2008 Chinese Championships, Feng won silver medals on the parallel bars and the horizontal bar. He was not selected for the 2008 Olympic team, but he went on to compete at the 2008 World Cup Final and tied with Yann Cucherat for the parallel bars title. He competed at his first World Championships in 2009 and advanced into the parallel bars final in first place. In the event final, he won the silver medal, behind teammate Wang Guanyin.

Feng won the parallel bars and the horizontal bar gold medals at the 2010 Porto World Cup. He then competed with the Chinese team that won the gold medal at the 2010 World Championships, and Feng became the World champion on the parallel bars. After the World Championshops, he competed at the 2010 Asian Games and helped China win its tenth consecutive Asian Games team title. Then in the event finals, he won a gold medal on the parallel bars and a silver medal on the vault, behind Yang Hak-seon.

At the 2011 Paris World Cup, Feng won a parallel bars silver medal. He was then selected to compete at the 2011 World Championships, where China successfully defended its World team title. He advanced into the parallel bars final but did not defend his individual title and finished seventh.

Feng won a parallel bars gold medal at the 2012 Zibo World Cup. He was then selected to represent China at the 2012 Summer Olympics alongside Chen Yibing, Guo Weiyang, Zhang Chenglong, and Zou Kai. The team had several mistakes during the qualification round and advanced to the team final in sixth place. They hit all of their routines in the team final and won the gold medal by four points ahead of Japan. Individually, Feng advanced to the parallel bars final, where he won another gold medal.

== Personal life ==
Feng graduated from Beijing Sport University in 2011. In 2015, he competed with then-girlfriend Zhu Zhu on season 2 of The Amazing Race China.

== See also ==
- China at the 2012 Summer Olympics
