= Xing Aowei =

Chinese artistic gymnast

- Born: February 15, 1982 (age 44) Yantai, Shandong, China

Gymnastics career
- Discipline: Men's artistic gymnastics
- Country represented: China
Medal record
Men's artistic gymnastics
Representing China
Olympic Games
Gold medal – first place	2000 Sydney	Team
World Championships
Gold medal – first place	1999 Tianjin	Team
Gold medal – first place	2003 Anaheim	Team
Bronze medal – third place	1999 Tianjin	Floor exercise
Asian Games
Gold medal – first place	1998 Bangkok	Team
Gold medal – first place	1998 Bangkok	Pommel Horse
Bronze medal – third place	1998 Bangkok	Horizontal Bar
National Games
Gold medal – first place	2001 Guangzhou	Floor Exercise
Gold medal – first place	2001 Guangzhou	Horizontal Bar
Silver medal – second place	2005 Nanjing	Horizontal Bar

Xing Aowei (simplified Chinese: 邢傲伟; traditional Chinese: 邢傲偉; pinyin: Xíng Àowěi; born February 15, 1982, in Yantai, Shandong) is a male Chinese gymnast. Xing was part of the Chinese team that won the gold medal in the team event at the 2000 Summer Olympics in Sydney. He was also a part of the 2004 Olympic team in Athens, but placed fifth after his mistake in the floor exercise, plus two falls (and another major mistake) from his teammate Teng Haibin.

Xing was educated at Cheung Kong Graduate School of Business. Following his gymnastics career, he began selling products on livestream shopping.

== Major performances ==
- 1998 Asian Games - 1st team & pommel horse, 3rd horizontal bar
- 1998 National Championships - 1st pommel horse
- 1998 World Middle School Students Games - 1st all-around, floor exercise, pommel horse, parallel bars & horizontal bar
- 1999 National Championships - 1st pommel horse, 2nd floor exercise
- 1999 World Cup Series - 1st pommel horse
- 1999 National Champions Tournament - 2nd pommel horse
- 1999 World Championships - 1st team, 3rd floor exercise
- 2000 National Championships - 1st all-around, floor exercise & pommel horse, 2nd parallel bars
- 2000 Sydney Olympic Games - 1st team
- 2000 World Cup Grand Finals - 3rd pommel horse
- 2001 East Asian Games - 1st team, vaulting horse & horizontal bar
- 2001 National Championships - 1st horizontal bar
- 2001 National Games - 1st floor exercise & horizontal bar
- 2004 Athens Olympics - 5th team
