= Xu Zhiqiang =

Chinese gymnast

Gymnastics career
- Discipline: Men's artistic gymnastics
- Country represented: China
Medal record
Olympic Games
Silver medal – second place	1984 Los Angeles	Team
World Championships
Gold medal – first place	1983 Budapest	Team
Silver medal – second place	1985 Montreal	Team
Silver medal – second place	1987 Rotterdam	Team
Asian Games
Gold medal – first place	1986 Seoul	Team

Xu Zhiqiang (Chinese: 许志强) (born 4 March 1963) is a former male Chinese gymnast.

Xu was born in Guangzhou, Guangdong Province. He joined the People's Liberation Army in 1973, and enrolled in the army's gymnastics team. Later Xu was admitted into Chinese national team. Xu competed at the 1984 Olympic Games, and helped China win a silver medal in men's gymnastics team competition. He also competed at the 1988 Summer Olympics, but did not win a medal.
