= Li Ge =

Chinese artistic gymnast

- Born: April 12, 1969 (age 57)

Gymnastics career
- Discipline: Men's artistic gymnastics
- Country represented: China
Medal record
Representing China
Olympic Games
Silver medal – second place	1992 Barcelona	Team
World Championships
Bronze medal – third place	1989 Stuttgart	Team
Silver medal – second place	1991 Indianapolis	Team
Asian Games
Gold medal – first place	1990 Beijing	Team
Gold medal – first place	1990 Beijing	Rings

Li Ge (born 12 April 1969) is a Chinese former gymnast who competed in the 1992 Summer Olympics.
