= Deng Shudi =

Chinese artistic gymnast

- Full name: Deng Shudi
- Born: 10 September 1991 (age 34) Guiyang, Guizhou, China
- Height: 1.63 m (5 ft 4 in)

Gymnastics career
- Discipline: Men's artistic gymnastics
- Country represented: China
- Club: National Team
- Head coach: Huang Yubin
Medal record
Representing China
Olympic Games
Bronze medal – third place	2016 Rio de Janeiro	Team
World Championships
Gold medal – first place	2014 Nanning	Team
Gold medal – first place	2018 Doha	Team
Silver medal – second place	2019 Stuttgart	Team
Bronze medal – third place	2015 Glasgow	Team
Bronze medal – third place	2015 Glasgow	All-around
Bronze medal – third place	2015 Glasgow	Parallel bars
Asian Games
Gold medal – first place	2018 Jakarta	Rings
Gold medal – first place	2018 Jakarta	Team
National Games
Gold medal – first place	2017 Tianjin	Team
Silver medal – second place	2013 Liaoning	Team
Silver medal – second place	2017 Tianjin	All-around
Silver medal – second place	2021 Shaanxi	Floor exercise
Bronze medal – third place	2013 Liaoning	All-around
Bronze medal – third place	2013 Liaoning	Parallel bars
Bronze medal – third place	2013 Liaoning	Horizontal bar

Deng Shudi (simplified Chinese: 邓书弟; traditional Chinese: 鄧書弟; pinyin: Dèng Shūdì; born September 10, 1991) is a Chinese artistic gymnast. He competed for the Chinese national team at the 2014 and 2015 World Championships.

== Gymnastics career ==
At the 2014 World Artistic Gymnastics Championships in Nanning, China, Deng competed on all six apparatuses in the men's team final, contributing a total score of 89.914 to the team's first-place finish. Individually, he finished sixth in the all-around with a score of 89.732 and fourth in parallel bars with a score of 15.666.

In 2015, Deng competed at the 2015 World Artistic Gymnastics Championships in Glasgow. In the team final, he competed in floor (14.966), rings (14.600), vault (15.233) and parallel bars (16.066), contributing to the Chinese team's third-place finish behind Japan and Great Britain. He came third in the individual all-around with a score of 90.099, which was the first medal in men's all-around at World Championships or Olympics level for China since Yang Wei won the all-around title at the 2008 Beijing Olympics seven years prior. Deng also tied with Oleg Stepko for a bronze medal in parallel bars, and finished fourth in floor exercise.

In 2018, he won the artistic gymnastics men's rings with a score of 14.750 at the 18th Asian Games in Jakarta, Indonesia.
