= Guo Linyao =

Chinese artistic gymnast

- Born: 10 March 1972 (age 54)
- Relatives: Guo Linsheng (brother); Guo Linxian (brother); Guo Linhong (sister)

Gymnastics career
- Discipline: Men's artistic gymnastics
- Country represented: China
Medal record
Olympic Games
Silver medal – second place	1992 Barcelona	Team
Bronze medal – third place	1992 Barcelona	Parallel bars
World Championships
Gold medal – first place	1994 Dortmund	Team
Silver medal – second place	1991 Indianapolis	Team
Silver medal – second place	1991 Indianapolis	Pommel horse
Bronze medal – third place	1991 Indianapolis	Parallel bars
Asian Games
Gold medal – first place	1990 Beijing	Team
Gold medal – first place	1990 Beijing	Pommel Horse
Gold medal – first place	1990 Beijing	Parallel Bars
Silver medal – second place	1990 Beijing	All-Around

Guo Linyao (born 10 March 1972) is a Chinese former gymnast who competed in the 1992 Summer Olympics. Coach Linyao Guo was born in China. He was born into a well-known gymnastics family. Both his mother, Huiqi Suo, and father, Shuzeng Guo, were gymnasts on the Chinese National Team. He has two older brothers, Guo Linsheng and Guo Linxian, and one older sister, Guo Linhong, who were all internationally competing gymnasts. His family, the "Guo" (国/國) - meaning Nation, is well known in the Chinese gymnastics field.
