= Zhang Jinjing =

Chinese gymnast

- Born: November 1, 1977 (age 48) Beijing, China

Gymnastics career
- Discipline: Men's artistic gymnastics
- Country represented: China
Medal record
Olympic Games
Silver medal – second place	1996 Atlanta	Team
World Championships
Gold medal – first place	1995 Sabae	Team
Gold medal – first place	1997 Lausanne	Team
Gold medal – first place	1997 Lausanne	Parallel bars
Bronze medal – third place	1995 Sabae	Horizontal bar
Asian Games
Gold medal – first place	1998 Bangkok	Team
Gold medal – first place	1998 Bangkok	Horizontal Bar
Silver medal – second place	1998 Bangkok	Parallel Bars

Zhang Jinjing (simplified Chinese: 张津京; traditional Chinese: 張津京; pinyin: Zhāng Jīnjīng, born November 1, 1977), also known as "JJ", is a Chinese gymnast. He competed at the 1996 Summer Olympics in Atlanta, winning a silver medal in men's team competition, as well as placing fourth in parallel bars and individual all-around. At the World Gymnastics Championships he won gold medals in 1995 and 1997 in men's team competition, shared a bronze for the horizontal bar in 1995, and took the individual gold medal for parallel bars in 1997.

In 2011, JinJing moved to the United States and began coaching at Champions Academy in Morgan Hill, CA, giving instruction not only to local youth, but also to NCAA All-around Champion and Stanford University graduate, Sho Nakamori.
