= Li Chunyang =

Chinese artistic gymnast

- Born: February 2, 1968 (age 58)

Gymnastics career
- Discipline: Men's artistic gymnastics
- Country represented: China
Medal record
Men's artistic gymnastics
Representing China
Event	1st	2nd	3rd
Olympic Games	0	1	0
World Championships	2	2	2
Asian Games	1	1	0
Total	3	4	2
Olympic Games
Silver medal – second place	1992 Barcelona	Team
World Championships
Gold medal – first place	1989 Stuttgart	Horizontal bar
Gold medal – first place	1991 Indianapolis	Horizontal bar
Silver medal – second place	1987 Rotterdam	Team
Silver medal – second place	1991 Indianapolis	Team
Bronze medal – third place	1989 Stuttgart	Team
Bronze medal – third place	1989 Stuttgart	Floor
Asian Games
Gold medal – first place	1990 Beijing	Team
Silver medal – second place	1990 Beijing	Rings

Li Chunyang (born 2 February 1968) is a Chinese former gymnast who competed in the 1988 Summer Olympics and in the 1992 Summer Olympics. He was the 1989 and 1991 world champion on horizontal bar.
