= Fan Bin =

Chinese artistic gymnast

- Born: 30 May 1974 (age 52)

Gymnastics career
- Discipline: Men's artistic gymnastics
- Country represented: China
Medal record
Olympic Games
Silver medal – second place	1996 Atlanta	Team
Bronze medal – third place	1996 Atlanta	Horizontal bar
World Championships
Gold medal – first place	1995 Sabae	Team

Fan Bin (Chinese: 范斌; pinyin: Fàn Bīn, born 30 May 1974) is a retired Chinese Olympic gymnast. He competed at the 1996 Summer Olympics in Atlanta, United States, winning a silver medal in the team competition, and a bronze medal in horizontal bar.

He is also a world champion from the 1995 World Artistic Gymnastics Championships with the Chinese national team.
