= Fan Hongbin =

Chinese artistic gymnast (born 1975)

- Born: 13 May 1975 (age 51)

Gymnastics career
- Discipline: Men's artistic gymnastics
- Country represented: China
Medal record
Representing China
Olympic Games
Silver medal – second place	1996 Atlanta	Team
World Championships
Gold medal – first place	1995 Sabae	Team
Asian Games
Gold medal – first place	1994 Hiroshima	Team
Gold medal – first place	1994 Hiroshima	Rings

Fan Hongbin (范红斌; born 13 May 1975) is a Chinese gymnast. He competed at the 1996 Summer Olympics in Atlanta, winning a silver medal in men's team competition.
