= Li Xiaoping =

Chinese artistic gymnast

- 李 小平
- Born: 19 September 1962 (age 63) Ningbo, Zhejiang, China

Gymnastics career
- Discipline: Men's artistic gymnastics
- Country represented: China
Medal record
Men's artistic gymnastics
Representing China
Olympic Games
Silver medal – second place	1984 Los Angeles	Team
Asian Games
Gold medal – first place	1982 New Delhi	Team
Gold medal – first place	1982 New Delhi	Pommel Horse

Li Xiaoping (Chinese: 李小平; pinyin: Lǐ Xiǎopíng, born 19 September 1962) is a male Chinese gymnast. He competed at the 1984 Olympic Games, and won a silver medal in Men's Team. In the 1983 World Championships, he won a gold medal for Men's Team and pommel horse.

After the Olympics, Xiaoping attended California State University, Fullerton and became the NCAA pommel horse champion at the 1987 NCAA Men's Gymnastics Championships.
