= Lou Yun =

Chinese artistic gymnast

- Born: 23 June 1964 (age 62) Hangzhou, Zhejiang, China

Gymnastics career
- Discipline: Men's artistic gymnastics
- Country represented: China
Medal record
Olympic Games
Gold medal – first place	1984 Los Angeles	Vault
Gold medal – first place	1988 Seoul	Vault
Silver medal – second place	1984 Los Angeles	Team
Silver medal – second place	1984 Los Angeles	Floor
Bronze medal – third place	1988 Seoul	Floor
World Championships
Gold medal – first place	1983 Budapest	Team
Gold medal – first place	1983 Budapest	Parallel bars
Gold medal – first place	1987 Rotterdam	Floor
Gold medal – first place	1987 Rotterdam	Vault
Silver medal – second place	1985 Montreal	Team
Silver medal – second place	1985 Montreal	Vault
Silver medal – second place	1987 Rotterdam	Team
Bronze medal – third place	1983 Budapest	All-around
Asian Games
Gold medal – first place	1982 New Delhi	Team
Gold medal – first place	1982 New Delhi	Vault
Gold medal – first place	1986 Seoul	Team
Gold medal – first place	1986 Seoul	Vault
Bronze medal – third place	1986 Seoul	Rings
Bronze medal – third place	1986 Seoul	Parallel Bars

Lou Yun (Chinese: 楼云; pinyin: Lóu Yún; born June 23, 1964, in Hangzhou, Zhejiang) is a retired Chinese gymnast who competed in the 1984 and 1988 Summer Olympic Games, winning the vault twice.

Lou Yun began gymnastics training at the Hangzhou Sports School for Amateurs, and in the same year he also entered the provincial sports school of Zhejiang. He was selected for the National Gymnastics team in 1977. Known for his specialty in the vault, he won the 1987 World Championships in that event, in addition to his two gold medals.
