= Li Xiaoshuang =

Chinese gymnast

- Born: 1 November 1973 (age 52) Xiantao, Hubei, China

Gymnastics career
- Discipline: Men's artistic gymnastics
- Country represented: China
- Retired: 1997
Medal record
Men's artistic gymnastics
Representing China
Event	1st	2nd	3rd
Olympic Games	2	3	1
World Championships	3	3	0
Asian Games	5	0	3
Total	10	6	4
Olympic Games
Gold medal – first place	1992 Barcelona	Floor
Gold medal – first place	1996 Atlanta	All-Around
Silver medal – second place	1992 Barcelona	Team
Silver medal – second place	1996 Atlanta	Team
Silver medal – second place	1996 Atlanta	Floor
Bronze medal – third place	1992 Barcelona	Rings
World Championships
Gold medal – first place	1994 Dortmund	Team
Gold medal – first place	1995 Sabae	Team
Gold medal – first place	1995 Sabae	All-Around
Silver medal – second place	1991 Indianapolis	Team
Silver medal – second place	1994 Brisbane	Vault
Silver medal – second place	1995 Sabae	Floor
Asian Games
Gold medal – first place	1990 Beijing	Team
Gold medal – first place	1990 Beijing	Floor Exercise
Gold medal – first place	1994 Hiroshima	Team
Gold medal – first place	1994 Hiroshima	All-Around
Gold medal – first place	1994 Hiroshima	Floor Exercise
Bronze medal – third place	1990 Beijing	All-Around
Bronze medal – third place	1994 Hiroshima	Parallel Bars
Bronze medal – third place	1994 Hiroshima	Vault

Li Xiaoshuang (Chinese: 李小双; pinyin: Lǐ Xiǎoshuāng; born November 1, 1973) is a Chinese gymnast and Olympic champion.

Li Xiaoshuang was born in Xiantao, Hubei. His gymnastic talent was discovered at the age of six. He and is twin brother Li Dashuang were members of China's gymnastics team at the 1992 Summer Olympics. He earned three Olympic medals at those games: the gold medal for floor exercise, a silver for the overall team championship, and a bronze on the rings.

In 1995, Li won the 1995 World Championships in Sabae, Japan, and helped the Chinese team to a second consecutive team championship.

During the 1996 Olympics in Atlanta, a slip by Li in the final compulsory team event was one of the team's errors that caused the Chinese team to finish second behind the Russians. Li competed solidly, however, and qualified into the all-around finals where he won the gold medal over Russian Alexei Nemov by 0.05 of a point. Li became the first Chinese Olympic all-around Champion.

Li retired from gymnastic competition in 1997 and has since started his own sporting apparel company. Li is also a senior colonel in the People's Liberation Army.
