= Li Dashuang =

Chinese artistic gymnast

- Born: 1 November 1973 (age 52) Xiantao, Hubei, China
- Height: 159 cm (5 ft 3 in)
- Relatives: Li Xiaoshuang (brother)

Gymnastics career
- Discipline: Men's artistic gymnastics
- Country represented: China
Medal record
Representing China
Olympic Games
Silver medal – second place	1992 Barcelona	Team
World Championships
Gold medal – first place	1994 Dortmund	Team
Asian Games
Gold medal – first place	1994 Hiroshima	Team
Silver medal – second place	1994 Hiroshima	Vault

Li Dashuang (simplified Chinese: 李大双; traditional Chinese: 李大雙; pinyin: Lǐ Dàshuāng; born 1 November 1973 in Xiantao, Hubei) is a Chinese artistic gymnast and twin brother of Li Xiaoshuang.

He won a silver medal as a member of the team from China at the 1992 Summer Olympics.
