= Huang Huadong =

Chinese artistic gymnast

- Born: 2 January 1972 (age 54) Suixi, Zhanjiang, Guangdong, China

Gymnastics career
- Discipline: Men's artistic gymnastics
- Country represented: China
Medal record
Representing China
Olympic Games
Silver medal – second place	1996 Atlanta	Team
World Championships
Gold medal – first place	1995 Sabae	Team
Silver medal – second place	1991 Indianapolis	Team
Silver medal – second place	1995 Sabae	Pommel horse
Asian Games
Gold medal – first place	1994 Hiroshima	Team
Gold medal – first place	1994 Hiroshima	Pommel Horse

Huang Huadong (simplified Chinese: 黄华东; traditional Chinese: 黃華東, born 2 January 1972) is a Chinese gymnast. He competed at the 1996 Summer Olympics in Atlanta, winning a silver medal in men's team competition.
