= Chen Yibing =

Chinese artistic gymnast

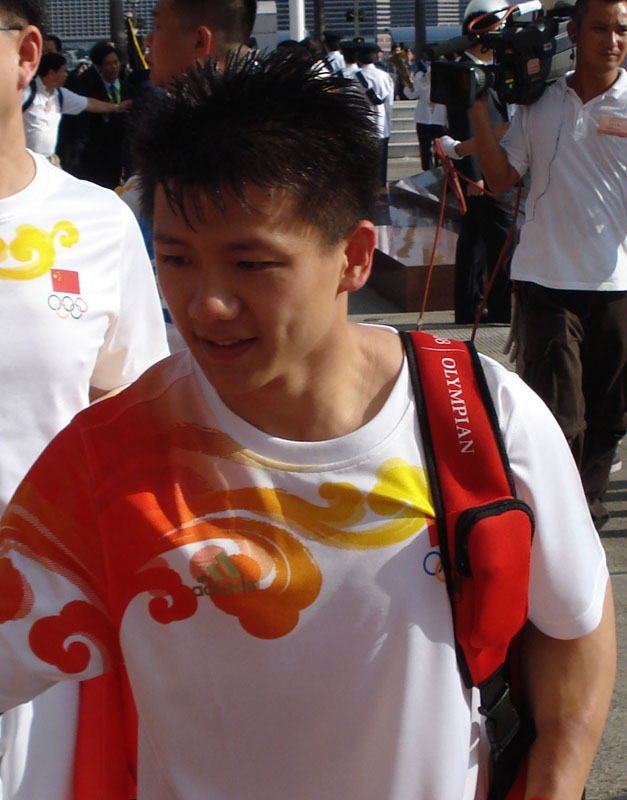

Personal information
- Full name: Chen Yibing
- Born: 19 December 1984 (age 41) Tianjin, China
- Height: 160 cm (5 ft 3 in)

Gymnastics career
- Discipline: Men's artistic gymnastics
- Country represented: China
- Club: China National School
Medal record
Olympic Games
Gold medal – first place	2008 Beijing	Team
Gold medal – first place	2008 Beijing	Rings
Gold medal – first place	2012 London	Team
Silver medal – second place	2012 London	Rings
World Championships
Gold medal – first place	2006 Aarhus	Team
Gold medal – first place	2006 Aarhus	Rings
Gold medal – first place	2007 Stuttgart	Team
Gold medal – first place	2007 Stuttgart	Rings
Gold medal – first place	2010 Rotterdam	Team
Gold medal – first place	2010 Rotterdam	Rings
Gold medal – first place	2011 Tokyo	Team
Gold medal – first place	2011 Tokyo	Rings
Asian Games
Gold medal – first place	2006 Doha	Team
Gold medal – first place	2006 Doha	Rings
Gold medal – first place	2010 Guangzhou	Team
Gold medal – first place	2010 Guangzhou	Rings

Chen Yibing (Chinese: 陈一冰; pinyin: Chén Yībīng; born 19 December 1984) is a Chinese gymnast, a four-time world champion on still rings. Chen was part of the Chinese team that won the gold medal in the team event at the World Artistic Gymnastics Championships in 2006, 2007, 2010 and 2011 (no team competition in 2005 and 2009) and the Asian Games in 2006 and 2010. Since his international debut at the 2006 World Artistic Gymnastics Championships, he was almost unbeatable on his specialist event, still rings, except to his teammate Yan Mingyong in 2009 and the Brazilian Arthur Nabarrete Zanetti at the 2012 Summer Olympics. He became the 2006, 2007, 2010 and 2011 world champions on still rings.

Chinese gymnastics head coach Huang Yubin questioned Chen's position at the 2012 Summer Olympics. He was quoted as saying that "because of the ugly behaviors of the judges, it has hurt Chinese Gymnast, as well as being a humiliation to this event." According to Xinhua News, Huang also called the night a "dark night in the history of gymnastics". H.

Chen was also a member of the 2008 Beijing Olympics team and won gold for China in men's team gymnastics as well as gold on the Rings. His still rings performance was described as 'perfect' and 'textbook-worthy', highly acclaimed for its precision and high level of difficulty.

He is a student at the Beijing Normal University, the present captain of the men's Chinese gymnastic team, and currently has 8 world titles and 3 Olympic gold medals.

== See also ==
- China at the 2012 Summer Olympics
