= Huang Liping =

Chinese artistic gymnast

- Born: 9 April 1973 (age 53) Wuhan, China

Gymnastics career
- Discipline: Men's artistic gymnastics
- Country represented: China
Medal record
Representing China
Olympic Games
Silver medal – second place	1996 Atlanta	Team competition
World Championships
Gold medal – first place	1994 Brisbane	Parallel bars
Gold medal – first place	1995 Sabae	Team
Silver medal – second place	1995 Sabae	Parallel bars
Asian Games
Gold medal – first place	1994 Hiroshima	Team
Gold medal – first place	1994 Hiroshima	Parallel Bars
Silver medal – second place	1994 Hiroshima	All-Around
Silver medal – second place	1994 Hiroshima	Horizontal Bar

Huang Liping (Chinese: 黄力平, born 9 April 1973 in Wuhan, Hubei, China) is a gymnastics magistrate and former Chinese gymnast.

== Gymnastics career ==
Huang started as an amateur in 1978, joining the Hubei team in 1985, and was selected to China's national gymnastics team the following year. He won gold medals in the team all-around, individual all-around, high bar and parallel bars at the 1993 National Gymnastics Games, and went on to win several medals at the World Artistic Gymnastics Championships. At the 1996 Summer Olympics in Atlanta, he won a silver medal with the Chinese team and finished sixth on the parallel bars.

== Post-gymnastics career ==
Retiring after the 1996 games, Huang became the youngest world-class gymnastics magistrate in China. In 1998, he was named the Chinese national gymnastics coach, replacing Li Ning in that position.

=== Beijing 2008 ===
At the 2008 Summer Olympics in Beijing, Huang took the Olympic Oath for judges at the Beijing National Stadium during the Opening Ceremonies.
