= Asian Artistic Gymnastics Championships – Men's pommel horse =

The Asian Artistic Gymnastics Championships were first held in 1996.

Three medals are awarded: gold for first place, silver for second place, and bronze for third place.

== Medalists ==
Year	Location	Gold	Silver	Bronze
1996	(China) Changsha	(South Korea) Han Yoon-soo (North Korea) Kim Hyon-il	Not awarded	(Chinese Taipei) Wu Chin-chan
2003	(China) Guangzhou	(China) Liang Fuliang	(Chinese Taipei) Lin Hsiang-wei (China) Lu Bin	Not awarded
2006	(India) Surat	(Chinese Taipei) Lin Hsiang-wei	(Chinese Taipei) Huang Che-kuei	(South Korea) Kim Ji-hoon
2008	(Qatar) Doha	(South Korea) Ha Chang-ju	(South Korea) Kim Soo-myun	(Japan) Yosuke Hoshi
2012	(China) Putian	(China) Liu Rongbing	(Japan) Yoshiaki Furutani (China) Ji Lianshen	Not awarded
2015	(Japan) Hiroshima	(Japan) Kazuma Kaya	(Japan) Xiao Ruoteng	(Iran) Abdollah Jameei
2017	(Thailand) Bangkok	(China) Xiao Ruoteng	(China) Zou Jingyuan	(Iran) Saeid Reza Keikha
2019	(Mongolia) Ulaanbaatar	(Jordan) Ahmad Abu Al-Soud	(Iran) Saeid Reza Keikha	(China) Liu Rongbing
2022	(Qatar) Doha	(Jordan) Ahmad Abu Al-Soud	(Kazakhstan) Nariman Kurbanov	(China) Yin Dehang
2023	Singapore	(Kazakhstan) Nariman Kurbanov	(Jordan) Ahmad Abu Al-Soud	(Hong Kong) Ng Kiu Chung
2024	(Uzbekistan) Tashkent	(Kazakhstan) Nariman Kurbanov	(Uzbekistan) Abdulla Azimov	(Jordan) Ahmad Abu Al-Soud
2025	(South Korea) Jecheon	(Kazakhstan) Nariman Kurbanov	(South Korea) Hur Woong	(Vietnam) Đặng Ngọc Xuân Thiện
2026	(China) Zunyi	(Uzbekistan) Utkirbek Juraev	(China) Zhang Boheng	(Chinese Taipei) Lee Chih-kai

== Medal table ==
Rank	Nation	Gold	Silver	Bronze	Total
1	China (CHN)	3	4	2	9
2	Kazakhstan (KAZ)	3	1	0	4
3	South Korea (KOR)	2	2	1	5
4	Jordan (JOR)	2	1	1	4
5	Chinese Taipei (TPE)	1	2	2	5
6	Japan (JPN)	1	2	1	4
7	Uzbekistan (UZB)	1	1	0	2
8	North Korea (PRK)	1	0	0	1
9	Iran (IRI)	0	1	2	3
10	Hong Kong (HKG)	0	0	1	1
10	Vietnam (VIE)	0	0	1	1
Totals (11 entries)		14	14	11	39
