= Parallel bars at the Olympics =

Parallel bars at the Olympic Games
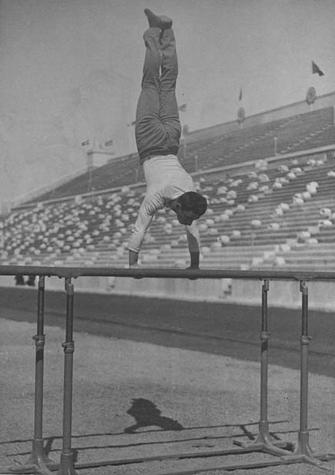
- Parallel bars competition at the 1896 Summer Olympics

Overview
- Sport: Artistic gymnastics
- Gender: Men
- Years held: Men: 1896, 1904, 1924–2024

Reigning champion
- Men: Zou Jingyuan (CHN)

The parallel bars is an artistic gymnastics event held at the Summer Olympics. The event was first held for men at the first modern Olympics in 1896. It was held again in 1904, but not in 1900, 1908, 1912, or 1920 when no apparatus events were awarded medals. The parallel bars was one of the components of the men's artistic individual all-around in 1900, 1908, and 1912, however. The men's parallel bars returned as a medal event in 1924 and has been held every Games since. Parallel bars scores were included in the individual all-around for 1924 and 1928, with no separate apparatus final. In 1932, the parallel bars was entirely separate from the all-around. From 1936 to 1956, there were again no separate apparatus finals with the parallel bars scores used in the all-around. Beginning in 1960, there were separate apparatus finals.

The 1896 Games also featured a team parallel bars event.

== Medalists ==
=== Men ===
Games	Gold	Silver	Bronze
1896 Athens	Alfred Flatow; Germany	Louis Zutter; Switzerland	Not awarded
1900 Paris	Not held		
1904 St. Louis	George Eyser; United States	Anton Heida; United States	John Duha; United States
1908 London	Not held		
1912 Stockholm	Not held		
1920 Antwerp	Not held		
1924 Paris	August Güttinger; Switzerland	Robert Pražák; Czechoslovakia	Giorgio Zampori; Italy
1928 Amsterdam	Ladislav Vácha; Czechoslovakia	Josip Primožič; Yugoslavia	Hermann Hänggi; Switzerland
1932 Los Angeles	Romeo Neri; Italy	István Pelle; Hungary	Heikki Savolainen; Finland
1936 Berlin	Konrad Frey; Germany	Michael Reusch; Switzerland	Alfred Schwarzmann; Germany
1948 London	Michael Reusch; Switzerland	Veikko Huhtanen; Finland	Christian Kipfer; Switzerland Josef Stalder; Switzerland
1952 Helsinki	Hans Eugster; Switzerland	Viktor Chukarin; Soviet Union	Josef Stalder; Switzerland
1956 Melbourne	Viktor Chukarin; Soviet Union	Masumi Kubota; Japan	Takashi Ono; Japan Masao Takemoto; Japan
1960 Rome	Boris Shakhlin; Soviet Union	Giovanni Carminucci; Italy	Takashi Ono; Japan
1964 Tokyo	Yukio Endo; Japan	Shuji Tsurumi; Japan	Franco Menichelli; Italy
1968 Mexico City	Akinori Nakayama; Japan	Mikhail Voronin; Soviet Union	Viktor Klimenko; Soviet Union
1972 Munich	Sawao Kato; Japan	Shigeru Kasamatsu; Japan	Eizo Kenmotsu; Japan
1976 Montreal	Sawao Kato; Japan	Nikolai Andrianov; Soviet Union	Mitsuo Tsukahara; Japan
1980 Moscow	Aleksandr Tkachyov; Soviet Union	Alexander Dityatin; Soviet Union	Roland Brückner; East Germany
1984 Los Angeles	Bart Conner; United States	Nobuyuki Kajitani; Japan	Mitchell Gaylord; United States
1988 Seoul	Vladimir Artemov; Soviet Union	Valeri Liukin; Soviet Union	Sven Tippelt; East Germany
1992 Barcelona	Vitaly Scherbo; Unified Team	Li Jing; China	Igor Korobchinski; Unified Team Guo Linyao; China Masayuki Matsunaga; Japan
1996 Atlanta	Rustam Sharipov; Ukraine	Jair Lynch; United States	Vitaly Scherbo; Belarus
2000 Sydney	Li Xiaopeng; China	Lee Joo-Hyung; South Korea	Alexei Nemov; Russia
2004 Athens	Valeri Goncharov; Ukraine	Hiroyuki Tomita; Japan	Li Xiaopeng; China
2008 Beijing	Li Xiaopeng; China	Yoo Won-Chul; South Korea	Anton Fokin; Uzbekistan
2012 London	Feng Zhe; China	Marcel Nguyen; Germany	Hamilton Sabot; France
2016 Rio de Janeiro	Oleg Verniaiev; Ukraine	Danell Leyva; United States	David Belyavskiy; Russia
2020 Tokyo	Zou Jingyuan; China	Lukas Dauser; Germany	Ferhat Arıcan; Turkey
2024 Paris	Zou Jingyuan; China	Illia Kovtun; Ukraine	Shinnosuke Oka; Japan

==== Multiple medalists ====
Rank	Gymnast	Nation	Olympics	Gold	Silver	Bronze	Total
1	Li Xiaopeng	China	2000–2008	2	0	1	3
2	Sawao Kato	Japan	1972–1976	2	0	0	2
2	Zou Jingyuan	China	2020–2024	2	0	0	2
4	Michael Reusch	Switzerland	1936–1948	1	1	0	2
4	Viktor Chukarin	Soviet Union	1952–1956	1	1	0	2
6	Vitaly Scherbo	Unified Team; Belarus	1992–1996	1	0	1	2
7	Josef Stalder	Switzerland	1948–1952	0	0	2	2
7	Takashi Ono	Japan	1956–1960	0	0	2	2

==== Medalists by country ====
Rank	Nation	Gold	Silver	Bronze	Total
1	China	5	1	2	8
2	Japan	4	5	7	16
3	Soviet Union	4	5	1	10
4	Switzerland	3	2	4	9
5	Ukraine	3	1	0	4
6	United States	2	3	2	7
7	Germany	2	2	1	5
8	Italy	1	1	2	4
9	Czechoslovakia	1	1	0	2
10	Unified Team	1	0	1	2
11	South Korea	0	2	0	2
12	Finland	0	1	1	2
13	Hungary	0	1	0	1
13	Yugoslavia	0	1	0	1
15	East Germany	0	0	2	2
15	Russia	0	0	2	2
17	Belarus	0	0	1	1
17	France	0	0	1	1
17	Turkey	0	0	1	1
17	Uzbekistan	0	0	1	1

== Gallery ==
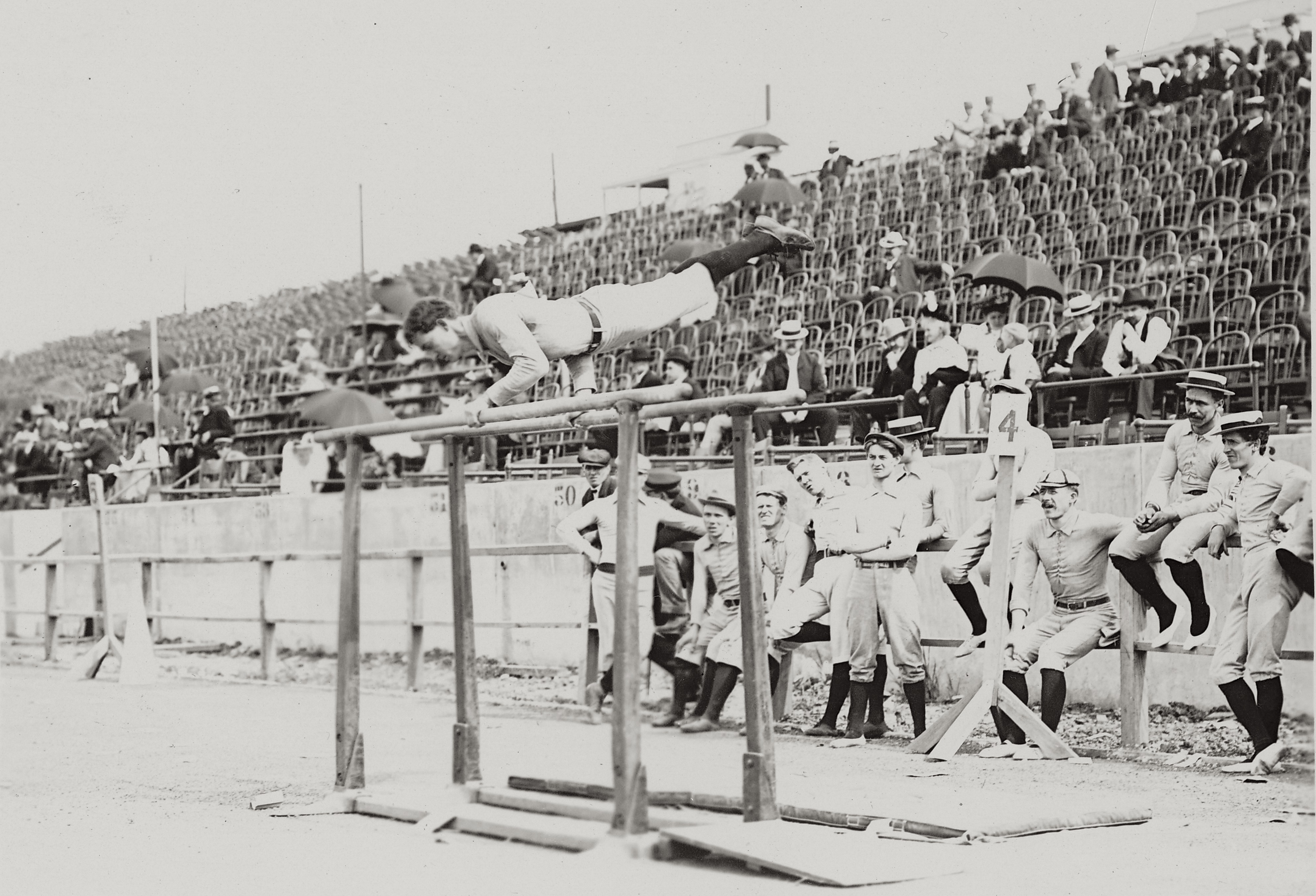
1932

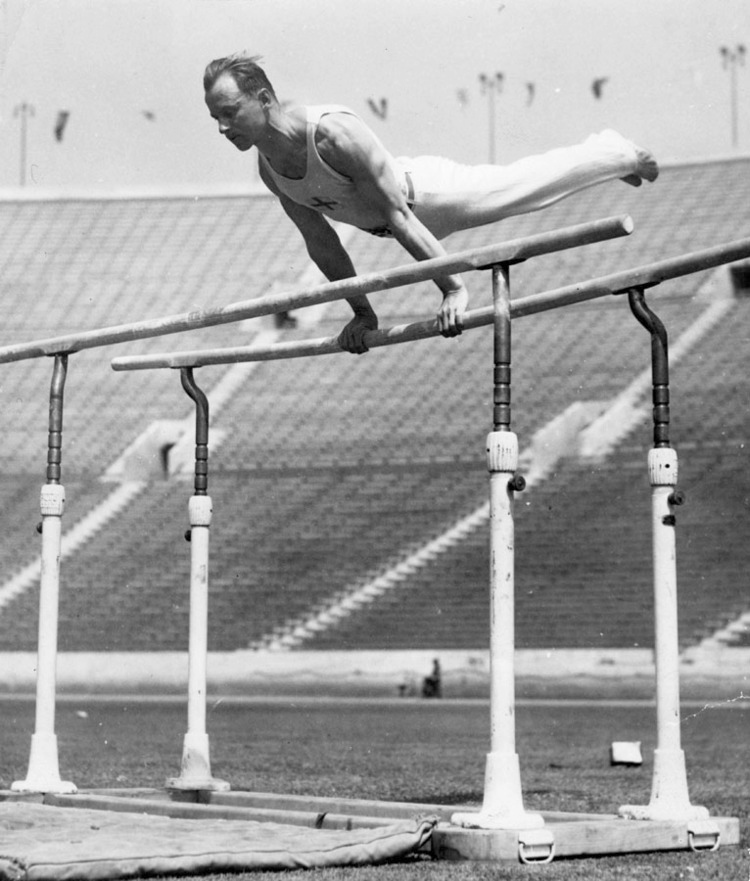
Heikki Savolainen, 1932

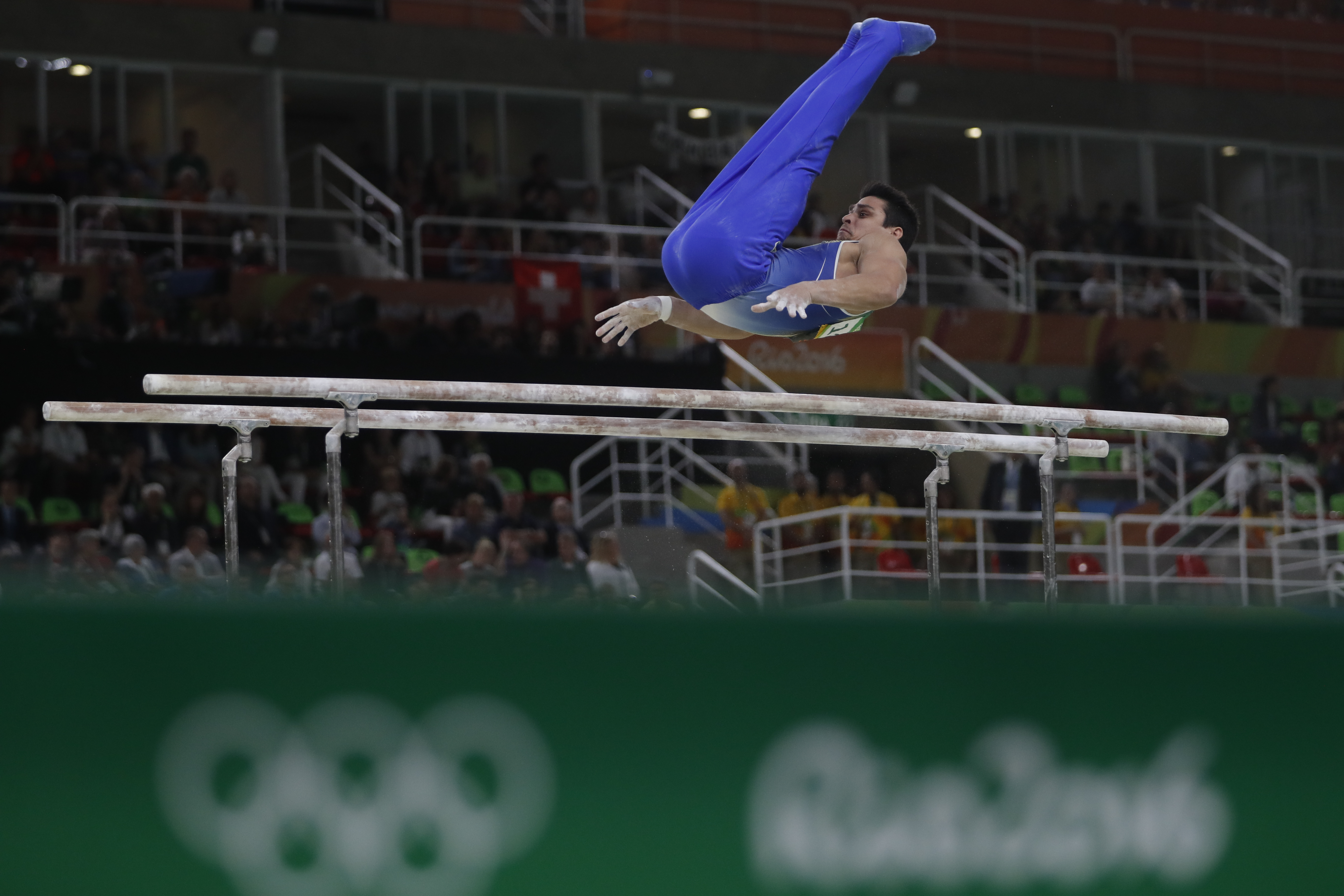
Sérgio Sasaki, 2016

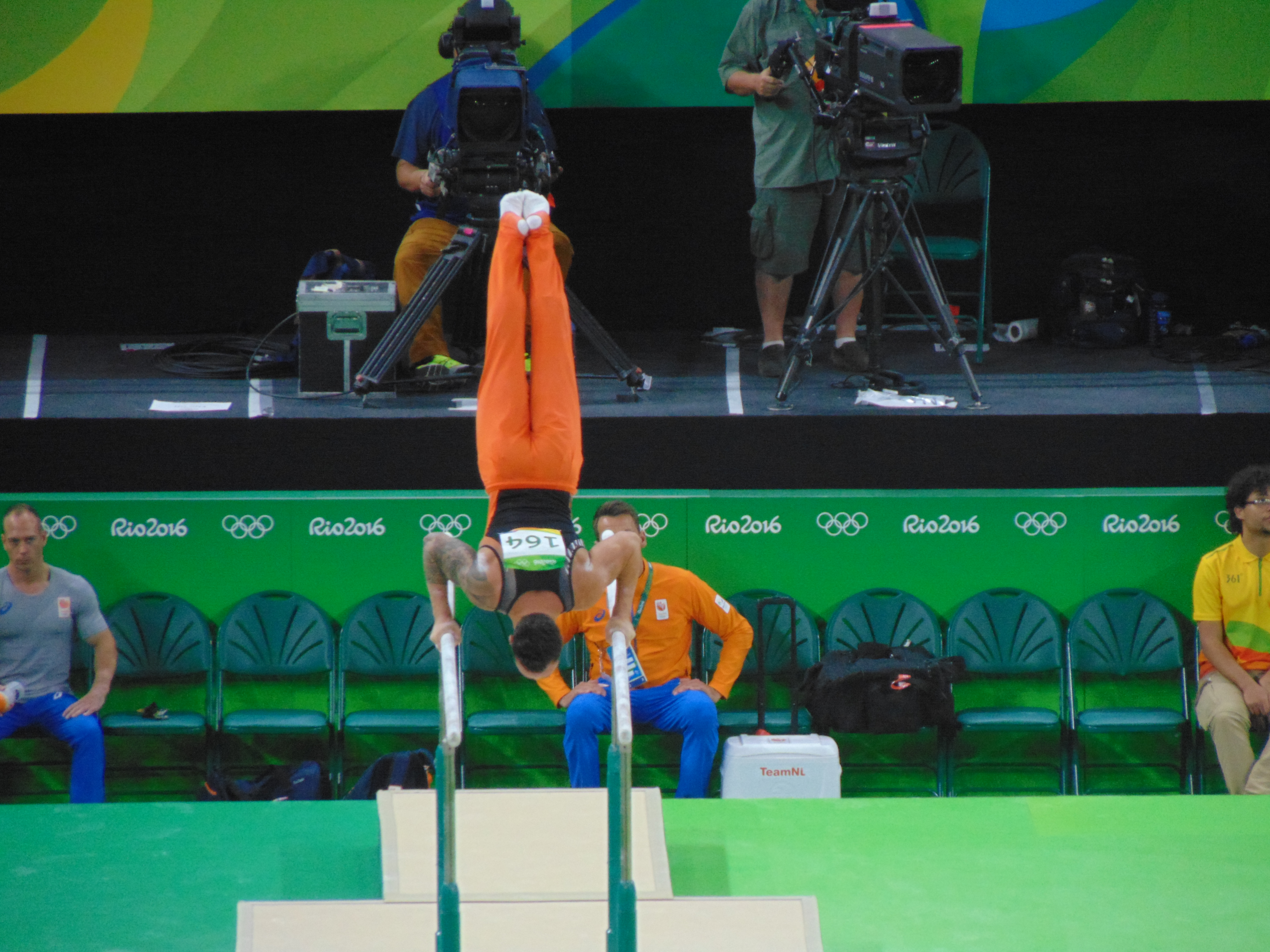
Bart Deurloo, 2016

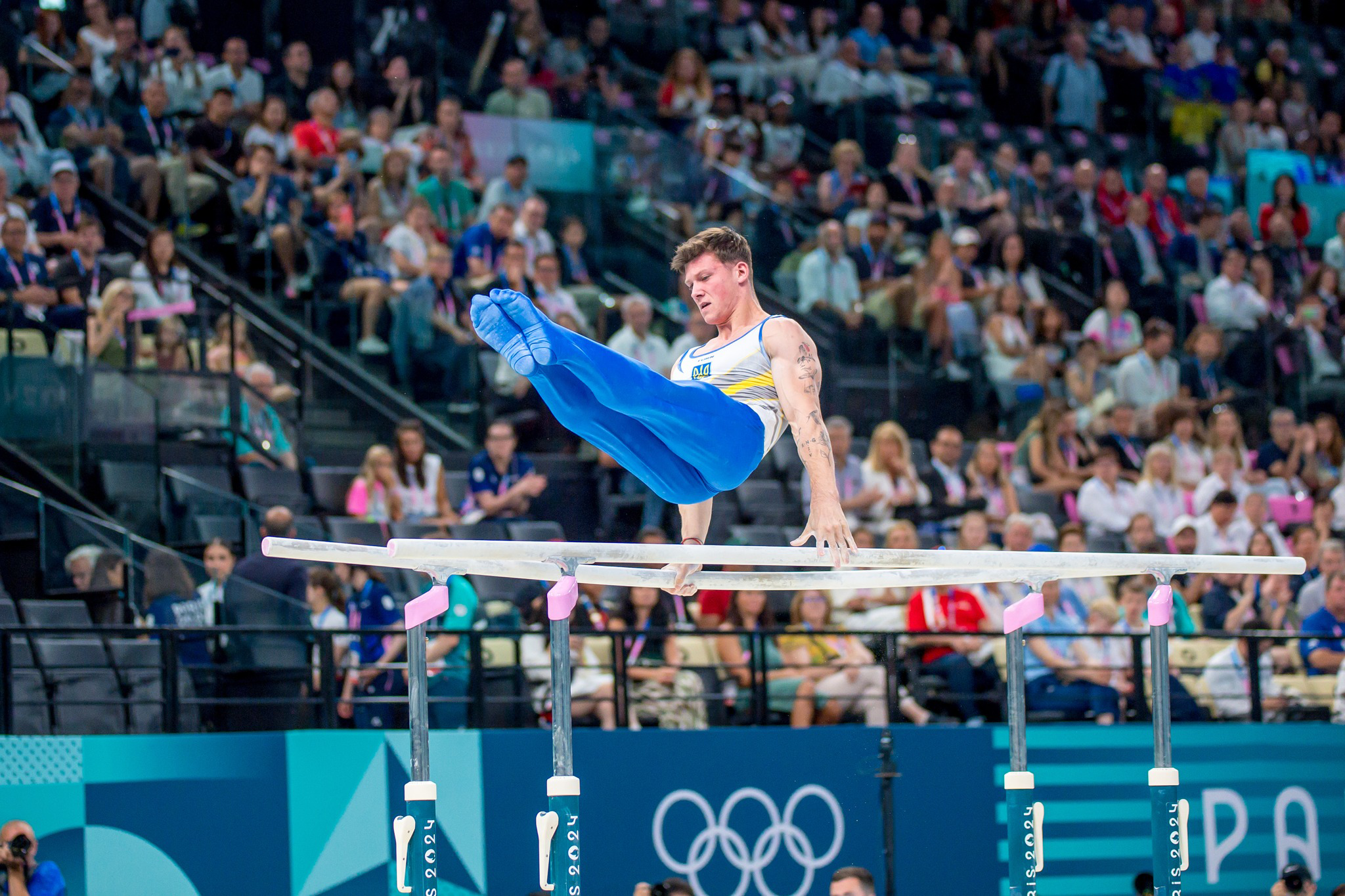
Illia Kovtun, 2024

Men's Parallel Bars at the Olympics

== Team parallel bars ==
At the 1896 Olympics a team version of the parallel bars was held. It was one of two team apparatus events in 1896, along with the team horizontal bar. The team apparatus events were never held again.

The team parallel bar event had 10 sets of parallel bars for the team to use. Teams could be large, with one exceeding 30 members. Three teams competed, one from Germany and two from Greece. Judges scored the teams on execution, rhythm, and technical difficulty.

Games	Gold	Silver	Bronze
1896 Athens	Germany (GER)	Panellinios G.S. (GRE)	Ethnikos G.S. Athens (GRE)
