= Gymnastics at the 2026 Asian Games – Men's parallel bars =

Men's parallel bars at the 2026 Asian Games
- Venue: Nippon Gaishi Hall Rainbow Hall
- Date: 21 September 2026 (Qualification); 25 September 2026 (Final)
- Competitors: 8 from 6 nations

Medalists
gold medal	Zou Jingyuan	China
silver medal	Shinnosuke Oka	Japan
bronze medal	Rasuljon Abdurakhimov	Uzbekistan

The men's parallel bars competition at the 2026 Asian Games took place on 25 September 2026 at Nippon Gaishi Hall Rainbow Hall.

== Schedule ==
All times are Japan Standard Time (UTC+09:00)

Date	Time	Event
Monday, 21 September 2026	10:00	Qualification
Friday, 25 September 2026	16:50	Final

== Qualification ==
Rank	Gymnast	D Score	E Score	Pen.	Bon.	Total	Qual.
1	Zou Jingyuan (CHN)	6.0	9.233		0.1	15.333	Q
2	Zhang Boheng (CHN)	5.9	8.800			14.700	~~Q~~ WD
3	Shinnosuke Oka (JPN)	5.4	9.133		0.1	14.633	Q
4	Tomoharu Tsunogai (JPN)	5.7	8.933			14.633	Q
5	Daiki Hashimoto (JPN)	5.6	8.700			14.300	–
6	Carlos Yulo (PHI)	5.6	8.666			14.266	Q
7	Lan Xingyu (CHN)	5.9	8.366			14.266	Q Sub
8	Rasuljon Abdurakhimov (UZB)	5.4	8.833			14.233	Q
9	Kim Jae-ho (KOR)	5.2	8.466			13.666	Q
10	Lee Chih-kai (TPE)	4.8	8.833			13.633	Q
11	Lee Jung-hyo (KOR)	5.2	8.233			13.433	R1
12	Milad Karimi (KAZ)	4.4	8.933			13.333	R2
13	Sun Wei (CHN)	5.7	7.633			13.333	–
14	Nurtan Idrissov (KAZ)	5.0	8.200			13.300	R3

== Final ==
Rank	Gymnast	D Score	E Score	Pen.	Bon.	Total
1st place, gold medalist(s)	Zou Jingyuan (CHN)	6.0	9.400		0.1	15.500
2nd place, silver medalist(s)	Shinnosuke Oka (JPN)	5.4	9.000		0.1	14.500
3rd place, bronze medalist(s)	Rasuljon Abdurakhimov (UZB)	5.4	9.033			14.433
4	Carlos Yulo (PHI)	5.6	8.700			14.300
5	Lan Xingyu (CHN)	5.9	7.866			13.766
6	Kim Jae-ho (KOR)	5.2	8.533			13.733
7	Tomoharu Tsunogai (JPN)	5.6	7.400			13.000
8	Lee Chih-kai (TPE)	4.5	7.600			12.100
