= Tomoharu Tsunogai =

Japanese artistic gymnast

- 角皆友晴
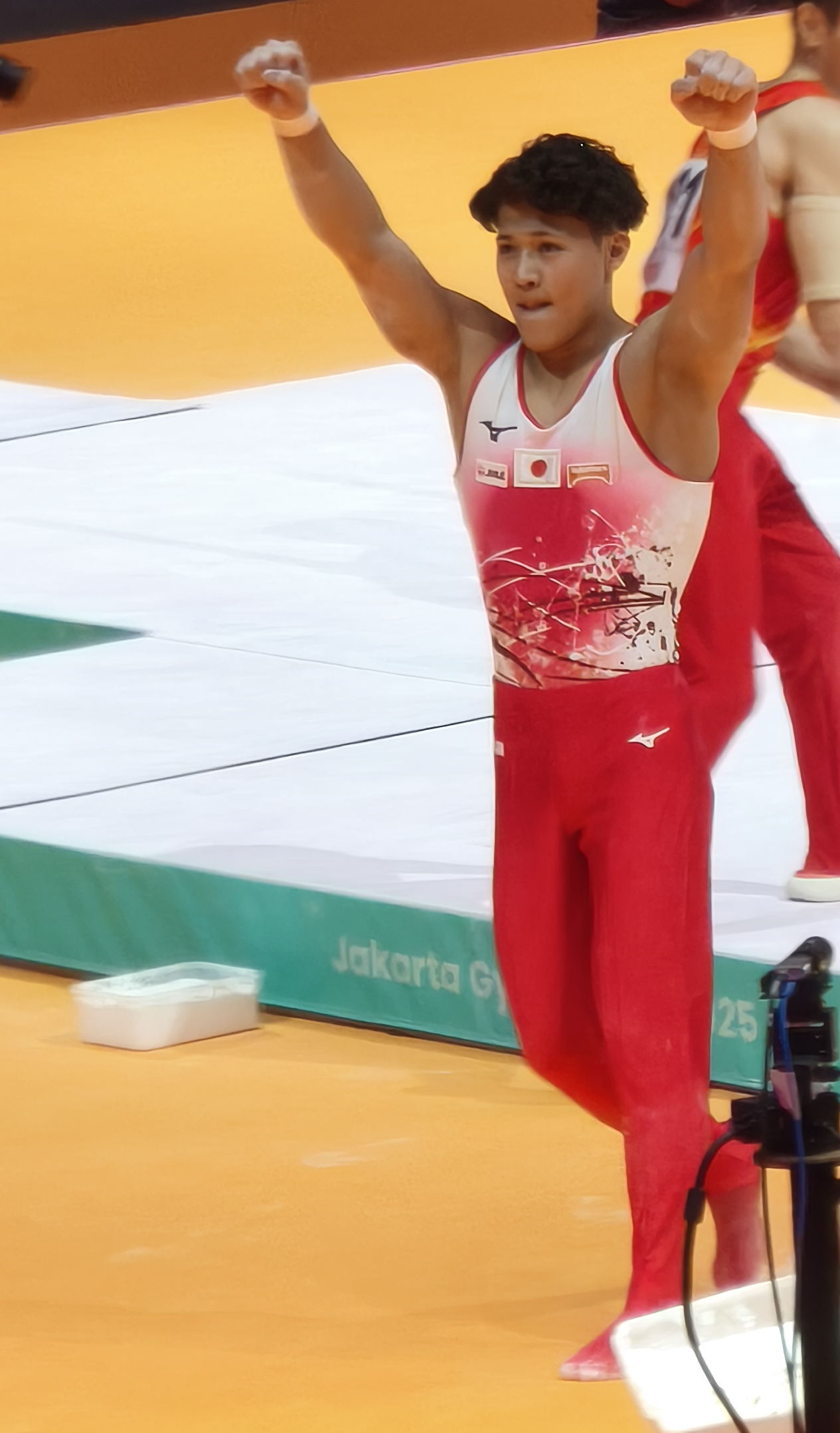
- Tsunogai at the 2025 World Championships

Personal information
- Full name: Tomoharu Tsunogai
- Nickname: Tomo
- Born: 22 April 2006 (age 20) Japan

Gymnastics career
- Discipline: Men's artistic gymnastics
- Country represented: Japan; (2023–present)
- Club: Funabashi Municipal High School
Medal record
Representing Japan
Men's artistic gymnastics
World Championships
| Silver medal – second place | 2025 Jakarta | Parallel bars |
Asian Games
| Silver medal – second place | 2026 Aichi-Nagoya | Team |
Asian Championships
| Gold medal – first place | 2025 Jecheon | Team |
| Silver medal – second place | 2025 Jecheon | Parallel bars |
| Silver medal – second place | 2025 Jecheon | Horizontal bar |
World University Games
| Gold medal – first place | 2025 Rhine-Ruhr | Team |
| Gold medal – first place | 2025 Rhine-Ruhr | Parallel bars |
Junior World Championships
| Gold medal – first place | 2023 Antalya | Team |
| Gold medal – first place | 2023 Antalya | Parallel bars |
| Gold medal – first place | 2023 Antalya | Horizontal bar |

Tomoharu Tsunogai (角皆友晴, Tomoharu Tsunogai; born 22 April 2006) is a Japanese artistic gymnast. He was part of the gold medal winning teams at the 2023 Junior World Championships, 2025 Asian Championships, and 2025 World University Games. Individually he is the 2023 Junior World Champion on parallel bars and horizontal bar and the 2025 World silver medalist on the parallel bars.

== Gymnastics career ==
Tsunogai competed at the 2023 Junior World Championships alongside Haruto Kamiyama and Masaharu Tanida; together they won gold as a team. During individual finals he placed fourth in the all-around, seventh on floor exercise, fifth on rings, and won gold on parallel bars and horizontal bar.

In 2025 Tsunogai competed at the DTB Pokal Team Challenge where he helped Japan place first as a team; individually he won gold on the parallel bars. At the 2025 Asian Championships he once again helped Japan win gold as a team. Individually he won silver medals on parallel bars and horizontal bar behind Shinnosuke Oka and Tang Chia-hung respectively. In July, Tsunogai competed at the 2025 World University Games where he helped Japan win gold as a team. Individually he won gold on the parallel bars.

Tsunogai was selected to represent Japan at the 2025 World Championships. While there he qualified to the parallel bars and horizontal bar finals in third and first respectively. He went on to win the silver medal in the parallel bars final behind two-time Olympic champion Zou Jingyuan and placed fourth on horizontal bar.

== Competitive history ==
Competitive history of Tomoharu Tsunogai at the junior level
| Year | Event | Team | AA | FX | PH | SR | VT | PB | HB |
|---|---|---|---|---|---|---|---|---|---|
| 2022 | All-Japan Team Championships | 10 | | | | | | | |
2023
| 2023 | Junior World Championships | 1st place, gold medalist(s) | 4 | 7 | | 5 | | 1st place, gold medalist(s) | 1st place, gold medalist(s) |
| 2023 | All-Japan Championships | | 60 | | | | | | |
| 2023 | All-Japan Junior Championships | | 3rd place, bronze medalist(s) | | | | | | |
| 2023 | All-Japan Team Championships | 11 | | | | | | | |

Competitive history of Tomoharu Tsunogai at the senior level
| Year | Event | Team | AA | FX | PH | SR | VT | PB | HB |
|---|---|---|---|---|---|---|---|---|---|
| 2024 | DTB Pokal Team Challenge | 7 | | | | | | | 4 |
| 2024 | All-Japan Championships | | 14 | | | | | | |
| 2024 | NHK Trophy | | 9 | | | | | | |
| 2024 | All-Japan Junior Championships | | 1st place, gold medalist(s) | | | | | | |
| 2024 | Japanese National Sports Festival | | 1st place, gold medalist(s) | | | | | | |
| 2024 | All-Japan Team Championships | 4 | | | | | | | |
| 2024 | All-Japan Event Championships | | | | | | | | 4 |
| 2025 | DTB Pokal Team Challenge | 1st place, gold medalist(s) | | 4 | | | | 1st place, gold medalist(s) | |
| 2025 | All-Japan Championships | | 3rd place, bronze medalist(s) | | | | | | |
| 2025 | NHK Trophy | | 7 | | | | | | |
| 2025 | Asian Championships | 1st place, gold medalist(s) | | | | | | 2nd place, silver medalist(s) | 2nd place, silver medalist(s) |
| 2025 | World University Games | 1st place, gold medalist(s) | | | | | | 1st place, gold medalist(s) | |
| 2025 | World Championships | —N/a | | | | | | 2nd place, silver medalist(s) | 4 |
| 2026 | American Cup | 3rd place, bronze medalist(s) | | | | | | | |
| 2026 | NHK Trophy | | 5 | | | | | | |
| 2026 | Asian Games | 2nd place, silver medalist(s) | | | | | | 7 | |
