= Colombia at the 2024 Summer Olympics =

Colombia at the Games of the XXXIII Olympiad in Paris

- IOC code: COL
- NOC: Colombian Olympic Committee
- Website: www.olimpicocol.co (in Spanish)

in Paris, France 26 July 2024 – 11 August 2024
- Competitors: 87 (37 men and 50 women) in 19 sports
- Flag bearers (opening): Kevin Quintero & Flor Ruiz
- Flag bearer (closing): Mariana Pajón
- Medals Ranked 66th: Gold 0 Silver 3 Bronze 1 Total 4

Summer Olympics appearances (overview)
- 1932; 1936; 1948; 1952; 1956; 1960; 1964; 1968; 1972; 1976; 1980; 1984; 1988; 1992; 1996; 2000; 2004; 2008; 2012; 2016; 2020; 2024

Colombia competed at the 2024 Summer Olympics in Paris from 26 July to 11 August 2024. It was the nation's twenty-first appearance at the Summer Olympics except for Helsinki 1952.

== Medalists ==
Medal	Name	Sport	Event	Date
Silver	Ángel Barajas	Gymnastics	Men's horizontal bar	5 August
Silver	Yeison López	Weightlifting	Men's 89 kg	9 August
Silver	Mari Sánchez	Weightlifting	Women's 71 kg	9 August
Bronze	Tatiana Rentería	Wrestling	Women's freestyle 76 kg	11 August

Medals by sport
Weightlifting	0	2	0	2
Gymnastics	0	1	0	1
Wrestling	0	0	1	1
Total	0	3	1	4

Medals by gender
Gender	1st place, gold medalist(s)	2nd place, silver medalist(s)	3rd place, bronze medalist(s)	Total
Female	0	1	1	2
Male	0	2	0	2
Mixed	0	0	0	0
Total	0	3	1	4

Medals by day
Day	1st place, gold medalist(s)	2nd place, silver medalist(s)	3rd place, bronze medalist(s)	Total
27 July	0	0	0	0
28 July	0	0	0	0
29 July	0	0	0	0
30 July	0	0	0	0
31 July	0	0	0	0
1 August	0	0	0	0
2 August	0	0	0	0
3 August	0	0	0	0
4 August	0	0	0	0
5 August	0	1	0	1
6 August	0	0	0	0
7 August	0	0	0	0
8 August	0	0	0	0
9 August	0	2	0	2
10 August	0	0	0	0
11 August	0	0	1	1
Total	0	3	1	4

== Competitors ==
The following is the list of number of competitors in the Games. Note that reserves in football are not counted:

Sport	Men	Women	Total
Archery	3	1	4
Athletics	8	10	18
Boxing	1	4	5
Canoeing	0	1	1
Cycling	9	6	15
Diving	3	0	3
Equestrian	1	0	1
Fencing	1	0	1
Football	0	18	18
Golf	2	1	3
Gymnastics	2	1	3
Judo	0	1	1
Sailing	1	0	1
Skateboarding	1	0	1
Swimming	1	1	2
Tennis	0	1	1
Triathlon	0	1	1
Weightlifting	2	2	4
Wrestling	2	2	4
Total	37	50	87

== Archery ==
Four Colombian archers have qualified for the 2024 Summer Olympics in the men's recurve and women's individual by virtue of their respective result at the 2023 Pan American Games in Santiago, Chile; and 2024 Pan American Championships in Medellín, Colombia.

Men

Athlete	Event	Ranking round		Round of 64	Round of 32	Round of 16	Quarterfinals	Semifinals	Final / BM	
Athlete	Event	Score	Seed	Opposition Score	Opposition Score	Opposition Score	Opposition Score	Opposition Score	Opposition Score	Rank
Santiago Arcila	Individual	673	15	Klein (LUX); W 6–4	Olaru (MDA); W 6–2	Kim J-d (KOR); L 4–6	Did not advance			=9
Jorge Enríquez	Individual	655	43	Zhangbyrbay (KAZ); W 7–3	Grande (MEX); L 2–6	Did not advance				=17
Andrés Hernández	Individual	642	56	Chirault (FRA); L 1–7	Did not advance					=33
Santiago Arcila; Jorge Enríquez; Andrés Hernández	Team	1970	11	—N/a		Turkey; L 4–5	Did not advance			=9

Women

Athlete	Event	Ranking round		Round of 64	Round of 32	Round of 16	Quarterfinals	Semifinals	Final / BM	
Athlete	Event	Score	Seed	Opposition Score	Opposition Score	Opposition Score	Opposition Score	Opposition Score	Opposition Score	Rank
Ana Rendón	Individual	649	36	Lei C-y (TPE); L 1–7	Did not advance					=33

Mixed

Athlete	Event	Ranking round		Round of 64	Round of 32	Round of 16	Quarterfinals	Semifinals	Final / BM	
Athlete	Event	Score	Seed	Opposition Score	Opposition Score	Opposition Score	Opposition Score	Opposition Score	Opposition Score	Rank
Ana Rendón; Santiago Arcila	Team	1322	15 Q	—N/a		Germany; L 4–5	Did not advance			=9

== Athletics (track and field) ==
Colombian track and field athletes achieved the entry standards for Paris 2024, either by passing the direct qualifying mark (or time for track and road races) or by world ranking, in the following events (a maximum of 3 athletes each):

Key

- Note–Ranks given for track events are within the athlete's heat only
- Q = Qualified for the next round
- q = Qualified for the next round as a fastest loser or, in field events, by position without achieving the qualifying target
- R = Qualified for the repechage round
- NR = National record
- N/A = Round not applicable for the event
- Bye = Athlete not required to compete in round

Track and road events
Men

Athlete	Event	Preliminary		Heat		Repechage		Semifinal		Final	
Athlete	Event	Result	Rank	Result	Rank	Result	Rank	Result	Rank	Result	Rank
Ronal Longa	100 m	Bye		10.29 =SB	7	—N/a		Did not advance			
Jhonny Rentería	100 m	Bye		10.38	8	—N/a		Did not advance			
Anthony Zambrano	400 m	—N/a		45.49	7 R	DNS		Did not advance			

Women

Athlete	Event	Preliminary		Heat		Repechage		Semifinal		Final	
Athlete	Event	Result	Rank	Result	Rank	Result	Rank	Result	Rank	Result	Rank
Evelis Aguilar	400 m	—N/a		53.36	7 R	52.86 SB	7	Did not advance			
Lina Licona	400 m	—N/a		51.85	6 R	51.90	4	Did not advance			
Angie Orjuela	Marathon	—N/a								2:42:57 SB	75
Sandra Arenas	20 km walk	—N/a								1:27:03 NR	4

Mixed

Athlete	Event	Heat		Final	
Athlete	Event	Result	Rank	Result	Rank
César Herrera; Laura Chalarca	Marathon walk relay	—N/a		3:03:56	19
Mateo Romero; Sandra Arenas	Marathon walk relay	—N/a		2:57:54	12

Field events
Men

Athlete	Event	Qualification		Final	
Athlete	Event	Distance	Position	Distance	Position
Arnovis Dalmero	Long jump	7.92	10 q	7.83	11
Geiner Moreno	Triple jump	16.40	23	Did not advance	
Mauricio Ortega	Discus throw	61.97	18	Did not advance	

Women

Athlete	Event	Qualification		Final	
Athlete	Event	Distance	Position	Distance	Position
Natalia Linares	Long jump	6.40	22	Did not advance	
Mayra Gaviria	Hammer throw	NM		Did not advance	
María Lucelly Murillo	Javelin throw	60.38 SB	16	Did not advance	
Flor Ruiz	Javelin throw	64.40	3 Q	63.00	5

Combined event – Women's heptathlon

Athlete	Event	100H	HJ	SP	200 m	LJ	JT	800 m	Final	Rank
Martha Araújo	Result	13.15	1.71	14.15 PB	24.46	6.61 PB	45.67	2:17.55 PB	6386 AR	=7
Martha Araújo	Points	1102	867	804	937	1043	776	857	6386 AR	=7

== Boxing ==
Colombia entered five boxers into the Olympic tournament. Yeni Arias (women's bantamweight), Valeria Arboleda (women's featherweight) and Angie Valdés (women's lightweight) qualified themself to Paris in their respective division by advancing to the semifinals round at the 2023 Pan American Games in Santiago, Chile. Later on, Yilmar González (men's featherweight) and Ingrit Valencia (women's flyweight) qualified for the games, following the triumph of winning quota bouts round, through the 2024 World Olympic Qualification Tournament 1 in Busto Arsizio, Italy.

Men

Athlete	Event	Round of 32	Round of 16	Quarterfinals	Semifinals	Final	
Athlete	Event	Opposition Result	Opposition Result	Opposition Result	Opposition Result	Opposition Result	Rank
Yilmar González	57 kg	Bye	Harada (JPN); L 0–5	Did not advance			=9

Women

Athlete	Event	Round of 32	Round of 16	Quarterfinals	Semifinals	Final	
Athlete	Event	Opposition Result	Opposition Result	Opposition Result	Opposition Result	Opposition Result	Rank
Ingrit Valencia	50 kg	Yesügen (MGL); W 5–0	Suraci (AUS); W 5–0	Kyzaibay (KAZ); L 1–4	Did not advance		=5
Yeni Arias	54 kg	Bye	Pawar (IND); W 3–2	Im (KOR); L 2–3	Did not advance		=5
Valeria Arboleda	57 kg	Bye	Xu (CHN); L 2–3	Did not advance			=9
Angie Valdés	60 kg	Bye	Sadiku (KOS); W 3–2	Harrington (IRL); L 0–5	Did not advance		=5

== Canoeing ==
=== Sprint ===
Colombian canoeists qualified one boats in the following distances for the Games through the 2024 Pan American Canoe Sprint Olympic Qualifiers in Sarasota, United States.

Women

Athlete	Event	Heats		Quarterfinals		Semifinals		Final	
Athlete	Event	Time	Rank	Time	Rank	Time	Rank	Time	Rank
Manuela Gómez	C-1 200 m	49.87	6 QF	49.54	4	Did not advance			26

Qualification Legend: FA = Qualify to final (medal); FB = Qualify to final B (non-medal)

== Cycling ==
=== Road ===
Colombia entered three road cyclists (two male and one female). Colombia qualified two male and one female through the UCI Nation Ranking.

Men

Athlete	Event	Time	Rank
Santiago Buitrago	Road race	6:21:49	19
Daniel Martínez	Road race	6:21:54	25

Women

Athlete	Event	Time	Rank
Paula Patiño	Road race	4:07:16	50

=== Track ===
Colombia entered five riders (three male and two female) for the following events, based on the nations performances, through the final UCI Olympic rankings.

Sprint

Athlete	Event	Qualification		Round 1	Repechage 1	Round 2	Repechage 2	Round 3	Repechage 3	Quarterfinals	Semifinals	Finals / BM	
Athlete	Event	Time Speed (km/h)	Rank	Opposition Time Speed (km/h)	Opposition Time Speed (km/h)	Opposition Time Speed (km/h)	Opposition Time Speed (km/h)	Opposition Time Speed (km/h)	Opposition Time Speed (km/h)	Opposition Time Speed (km/h)	Opposition Time Speed (km/h)	Opposition Time Speed (km/h)	Rank
Cristian Ortega	Men's sprint	9.426; 76.384	12 Q	Helal (FRA); W 9.943; 72.413	Bye	Carlin (GBR); L 9.831; 73.238	Obara (JPN); L 9.835; 73.208	Did not advance					13
Kevin Quintero	Men's sprint	9.669; 74.465	25	Did not advance									25
Martha Bayona	Women's sprint	10.411; 69.158	13 Q	Genest (CAN); W 10.932; 65.862	Bye	Gros (FRA); L 10.788; 66.741	Gaxiola (MEX); W 11.081; 64.976	Friedrich (GER); L 10.716; 67.189	Gros (FRA); Fulton (NZL); W 10.871; 66.231	Finucane (GBR); L 0–2	Did not advance	5th place final Capewell (GBR); Hinze (GER); Mitchell (CAN); L 10.780; 66.790	7
Stefany Cuadrado	Women's sprint	10.508 WJR; 68.519	15 Q	Mitchell (CAN); L 10.850; 66.359	Kouamé (FRA); Karwacka (POL); L 11.211; 64.223	Did not advance							17

Keirin

Athlete	Event	Round 1	Repechage	Quarterfinals	Semifinals	Final
Athlete	Event	Rank	Rank	Rank	Rank	Rank
Cristian Ortega	Men's keirin	3 R	2 Q	3 SF	4 FB	7
Kevin Quintero	Men's keirin	2 Q	Bye	6	Did not advance	=16
Martha Bayona	Women's keirin	6 R	4	Did not advance		=23
Stefany Cuadrado	Women's keirin	5 R	4	Did not advance		=23

Omnium

Athlete	Event	Scratch race		Tempo race		Elimination race		Points race		Total	
Athlete	Event	Rank	Points	Rank	Points	Rank	Points	Rank	Points	Rank	Points
Fernando Gaviria	Men's omnium	20	2	14	14	8	26	16	0	17	42

=== Mountain biking ===
Colombian mountain bikers secured one male quota places for the Olympic through 2023 UCI Mountain Bike World Championships in Glasgow, Great Britain.

Athlete	Event	Time	Rank
Diego Arias	Men's cross-country	1:35:13	31

=== BMX ===
==== Freestyle ====
Colombia received one quota spot for women's BMX freestyle at the Olympics, as a result of being the 2nd best non-qualified NOC at the 2023 UCI BMX Freestyle World Championships in Glasgow, Great Britain.

Athlete	Event	Qualification				Final		
Athlete	Event	Run 1	Run 2	Average	Rank	Run 1	Run 2	Rank
Queen Saray Villegas	Women's	81.60	87.25	84.42	6 Q	64.80	88.00	4

==== Race ====
Colombian riders secured five quota places (three men's and two women's) race for Paris 2024 through the allocations of final Olympic BMX ranking.

Athlete	Event	Quarterfinal		Last chance qualifier		Semifinal		Final	
Athlete	Event	Points	Rank	Result	Rank	Points	Rank	Result	Rank
Diego Arboleda	Men's	13	11 Q	Bye		18	12	Did not advance	
Mateo Carmona	Men's	11	9 Q	Bye		10	6 Q	33.166	6
Carlos Ramírez	Men's	16	16 q	DNF	8	Did not advance			
Gabriela Bolle	Women's	16	13 q	37.373	3 Q	19	14	Did not advance	
Mariana Pajón	Women's	16	14 q	36.015	1 Q	15	9	Did not advance	

== Diving ==
Colombia secured three quotas in the men's springboard and platform events, by virtue of his top twelve result at the 2023 World Championships in Fukuoka, Japan and 2024 World Championships in Doha, Qatar.

Men

Athlete	Event	Preliminary		Semifinal		Final	
Athlete	Event	Points	Rank	Points	Rank	Points	Rank
Daniel Restrepo	3 m springboard	361.10	20	Did not advance			
Luis Uribe	3 m springboard	375.90	17 Q	423.80	10 Q	421.85	6
Alejandro Solarte	10 m platform	363.10	20	Did not advance			

== Equestrian ==
Colombia entered one jumping rider into the games, by virtue of top three nations performances in individual jumping events, not yet qualified, at the 2023 Pan American Games in Santiago, Chile.

=== Jumping ===
Athlete	Horse	Event	Qualification			Final			Jump-off		
Athlete	Horse	Event	Penalties	Time	Rank	Penalties	Time	Rank	Penalties	Time	Rank
René Lopez	Kheros Van'T Hoogeinde	Individual	39	97.59	66	Did not advance					

== Fencing ==
Colombia entered one male fencer into the Olympic competition. Jhon Édison Rodríguez secured his quota places in men's épée events, after nominated as the highest ranked individual fencers, eligible for Pan American zone through the release of the FIE Official ranking for Paris 2024.

Men

Athlete	Event	Round of 64	Round of 32	Round of 16	Quarterfinal	Semifinal	Final / BM	
Athlete	Event	Opposition Score	Opposition Score	Opposition Score	Opposition Score	Opposition Score	Opposition Score	Rank
Jhon Édison Rodríguez	Épée	Bye	El-Sayed (EGY); L 7–15	Did not advance				26

== Football ==
Summary

Key:

- A.E.T – After extra time.
- P – Match decided by penalty-shootout.

Team	Event	Group Stage				Quarterfinal	Semifinal	Final / BM	
Team	Event	Opposition Score	Opposition Score	Opposition Score	Rank	Opposition Score	Opposition Score	Opposition Score	Rank
Colombia women's	Women's tournament	France; L 2–3	New Zealand; W 2–0	Canada; L 0–1	3 Q	Spain; L 2–2 (a.e.t.) 2–4^{P}	Did not advance		8

=== Women's tournament ===
Colombia women's football team qualified for the Olympics by advancing to the final match of the 2022 Copa América Femenina in Bucaramanga.

Team roster

Colombia named a squad of 18 players and 4 alternates for the tournament on 5 July 2024.

Head coach: Ángelo Marsiglia

No.	Pos.	Player	Date of birth (age)	Caps	Goals	Club
1	GK	Catalina Pérez	8 November 1994 (aged 29)	39	0	(German Football Association) Werder Bremen
2	DF	Manuela Vanegas	9 November 2000 (aged 23)	45	9	(Royal Spanish Football Federation) Real Sociedad
3	DF	Daniela Arias	31 August 1994 (aged 29)	45	4	(Brazilian Football Confederation) Corinthians
4	DF	Daniela Caracas	25 April 1997 (aged 27)	50	0	(Royal Spanish Football Federation) Espanyol
5	DF	Yirleidis Minota	10 November 2002 (aged 21)	2	0	(Mexican Football Federation) Pachuca
6	MF	Daniela Montoya (captain)	22 August 1990 (aged 33)	92	13	(Colombian Football Federation) Atlético Nacional
7	FW	Manuela Paví	23 December 2000 (aged 23)	16	4	(Colombian Football Federation) Deportivo Cali
8	MF	Marcela Restrepo	10 November 1995 (aged 28)	27	2	(Colombian Football Federation) Atlético Nacional
9	FW	Mayra Ramírez	25 March 1999 (aged 25)	38	6	(The Football Association) Chelsea
10	MF	Leicy Santos	16 May 1996 (aged 28)	71	15	(Royal Spanish Football Federation) Atlético Madrid
11	FW	Catalina Usme	25 December 1989 (aged 34)	113	56	(Mexican Football Federation) Pachuca
12	GK	Katherine Tapia	7 December 1992 (aged 31)	8	0	(Brazilian Football Confederation) Palmeiras
13	MF	Ilana Izquierdo	14 June 2002 (aged 22)	8	0	(United States Soccer Federation) Mississippi State Bulldogs
14	DF	Ángela Barón	18 September 2003 (aged 20)	8	0	(Colombian Football Federation) Atlético Nacional
15	MF	Liana Salazar	16 September 1992 (aged 31)	30	2	(Colombian Football Federation) Millonarios
16	DF	Jorelyn Carabalí	18 May 1997 (aged 27)	42	0	(The Football Association) Brighton & Hove Albion
17	DF	Carolina Arias	2 September 1990 (aged 33)	106	0	(Colombian Football Federation) América de Cali
18	FW	Linda Caicedo	22 February 2005 (aged 19)	33	11	(Royal Spanish Football Federation) Real Madrid
22	GK	Sandra Sepúlveda	3 March 1988 (aged 36)	75	0	(Colombian Football Federation) Llaneros

Group play

Pos	Team	Pld	W	D	L	GF	GA	GD	Pts	Qualification
1	France (H)	3	2	0	1	6	5	+1	6	Advance to knockout stage
2	Canada	3	3	0	0	5	2	+3	3 (Note: On 27 July 2024, Canada was penalized 6 points by FIFA for their coaching staff's involvement in illegal drone spying at an official training venue. The decision was upheld by CAS on 31 July.)	Advance to knockout stage
3	Colombia	3	1	0	2	4	4	0	3	Advance to knockout stage
4	New Zealand	3	0	0	3	2	6	−4	0	

Source: FIFA
Rules for classification: Group stage tiebreakers
(H) Hosts
Notes:
25 July 2024
21:00

France	3–2	Colombia
Katoto 6', 42'; Dali 18'	Report	Usme 54' (pen.); Paví 64'

Stade de Lyon, Décines-Charpieu
Attendance: 29,208
Referee: Tori Penso (United States)

28 July 2024
17:00

New Zealand	0–2	Colombia
	Report	Restrepo 27'; Santos 72'

Stade de Lyon, Décines-Charpieu
Attendance: 5,212
Referee: Kim Yu-jeong (South Korea)

31 July 2024
21:00

Colombia	0–1	Canada
	Report	Gilles 61'

Stade de Nice, Nice
Attendance: 5,388
Referee: Rebecca Welch (Great Britain)

Quarterfinal

3 August 2024
17:00

Spain	2–2 (a.e.t.)	Colombia
Hermoso 79'; Paredes 90+7'	Report	Ramírez 12'; Santos 52'
Penalties
Caldentey (penalty scored); Navarro (penalty scored); Paralluelo (penalty scored); Bonmatí (penalty scored)	4–2	(penalty missed) Usme; (penalty scored) Vanegas; (penalty missed) Salazar; (penalty scored) Carabalí

Stade de Lyon, Décines-Charpieu
Attendance: 10,355
Referee: Katia García (Mexico)

== Golf ==
Colombia entered three golfers into the Olympic tournament. Camilo Villegas, Nico Echavarría and Mariajo Uribe both qualified directly for the games in the individual competitions, based on their respective world ranking position, through the release of the final top 60 ranked players, on the IGF World Rankings.

Men

Athlete	Event	Round 1	Round 2	Round 3	Round 4	Total		
Athlete	Event	Score	Score	Score	Score	Score	Par	Rank
Nico Echavarría	Individual	74	69	71	68	282	−2	T35
Camilo Villegas	Individual	76	74	72	71	293	+9	57

Women

Athlete	Event	Round 1	Round 2	Round 3	Round 4	Total		
Athlete	Event	Score	Score	Score	Score	Score	Par	Rank
Mariajo Uribe	Individual	70	70	71	73	284	−4	T10

== Gymnastics ==
=== Artistic ===
Colombia entered two gymnasts (one female and one male) into the games. Luisa Blanco secured her spots directly for the games, by being the highest-ranked eligible athlete in the all-around at the 2023 Pan American Games in Santiago, Chile. Meanwhile, Ángel Barajas secured a quota place by virtue of becoming the highest eligible gymnast in men's parallel bars, not yet qualified, through the final ranking of 2024 FIG World Cup series.

Men
Individual

Athlete	Event	Qualification								Final							
Athlete	Event	Apparatus						Total	Rank	Apparatus						Total	Rank
Athlete	Event	F	PH	R	V	PB	HB	Total	Rank	F	PH	R	V	PB	HB	Total	Rank
Ángel Barajas	Parallel bars	—N/a				14.700	—N/a	14.700	14	Did not advance							
Ángel Barajas	Horizontal bar	—N/a					14.466	14.466	6 Q	—N/a					14.533	14.533	2nd place, silver medalist(s)

Women
Individual

Athlete	Event	Qualification						Final					
Athlete	Event	Apparatus				Total	Rank	Apparatus				Total	Rank
Athlete	Event	V	UB	BB	F	Total	Rank	V	UB	BB	F	Total	Rank
Luisa Blanco	All-around	13.466	12.833	12.766	12.633	51.698	30 Q	13.500	11.133	12.866	12.700	50.199	23

=== Trampoline ===
Colombia qualified one gymnast for the men's trampoline competition at Paris 2024 through the World Cup Series ranking.

Athlete	Event	Qualification		Final	
Athlete	Event	Score	Rank	Score	Rank
Ángel Hernández	Men's	58.640	8 Q	53.150	7

== Judo ==
Colombia qualified one judoka for the following weight class at the Games. Erika Lasso (women's extra-lightweight, 48 kg) got qualified via continental quota based on Olympic point rankings.

Women

Athlete	Event	Round of 32	Round of 16	Quarterfinals	Semifinals	Repechage	Final / BM	
Athlete	Event	Opposition Result	Opposition Result	Opposition Result	Opposition Result	Opposition Result	Opposition Result	Rank
Erika Lasso	–48 kg	Lin C-h (TPE); L 00–10	Did not advance					=17

== Sailing ==
Colombia qualified one boat in each of the following classes through the 2023 Pan American Games in Santiago, Chile.

Elimination events
Men

Athlete	Event	Race																															Final rank
Athlete	Event	1	2	3	4	5	6	7	8	9	10	11	12	13	14	15	16	TOT	PTS	Rank	SF1	SF2	SF3	SF4	SF5	SF6	F1	F2	F3	F4	F5	F6	Final rank
Victor Bolaños	Formula Kite	~~18~~	~~20~~	17	18	18	12	15	Cancelled									118	80	20	Did not advance												20

M = Medal race; EL = Eliminated – did not advance into the medal race

== Skateboarding ==
Colombia qualified one male by virtue of finishing in the Top 20 of the Olympic World Skateboarding Rankings.

Men

Athlete	Event	Qualification		Final	
Athlete	Event	Score	Rank	Score	Rank
Jhancarlos González	Street	48.09	22	Did not advance	

== Swimming ==
Colombia received two Universality quota places in Swimming. Anthony Rincón (men's 100 m backstroke) and Stefanía Gómez (women's 100 m breaststroke) received the Universality Quota places.

Men

Athlete	Event	Heat		Semifinal		Final	
Athlete	Event	Time	Rank	Time	Rank	Time	Rank
Anthony Rincón	100 m backstroke	55.42	37	Did not advance			

Women

Athlete	Event	Heat		Semifinal		Final	
Athlete	Event	Time	Rank	Time	Rank	Time	Rank
Stefanía Gómez	100 m breaststroke	1:09.16	29	Did not advance			

== Tennis ==
Colombia entered one tennis players into the Olympic tournament. Camila Osorio had claimed one via ITF Olympic women's singles places, as Colombia's top-ranked tennis player in the WTA World Rankings as of 10 June 2024

Women

Athlete	Event	Round of 64	Round of 32	Round of 16	Quarterfinal	Semifinal	Final / BM	
Athlete	Event	Opposition Result	Opposition Result	Opposition Result	Opposition Result	Opposition Result	Opposition Result	Rank
Camila Osorio	Singles	Ostapenko (LAT); W 6–4, 6–3	Yastremska (UKR); W 7–6^{(7–4)}, 6–4	Collins (USA); L 0–6, 6–4, 3–6	Did not advance			=9

== Triathlon ==
Colombia achieved a quota (one woman) for the women's individual triathlon competition at the 2024 Summer Olympics through the Individual Olympic Qualification Ranking.

Individual

Athlete	Event	Time						Rank
Athlete	Event	Swim (1.5 km)	Trans 1	Bike (40 km)	Trans 2	Run (10 km)	Total	Rank
Carolina Velásquez	Women's	24:38	0:56	1:00:41	0:32	35:26	2:02:13	37

== Weightlifting ==
Colombia entered four weightlifters into the Olympic competition. Yenny Álvarez (women's 59 kg), Mari Sánchez (women's 71 kg), Luis Javier Mosquera (men's 73 kg) and Yeison López (men's 89 kg) secured one of the top ten slots in her weight divisions based on the IWF Olympic Qualification Rankings.

Men

Athlete	Event	Snatch		Clean & Jerk		Total	Rank
Athlete	Event	Weight	Rank	Weight	Rank	Total	Rank
Luis Javier Mosquera	−73 kg	155	3	185	7	340	5
Yeison López	−89 kg	180	2	210	3	390	2nd place, silver medalist(s)

Women

Athlete	Event	Snatch		Clean & Jerk		Total	Rank
Athlete	Event	Weight	Rank	Weight	Rank	Total	Rank
Yenny Álvarez	−59 kg	105	3	~~132~~	—N/a	DNF	—N/a
Mari Sánchez	−71 kg	112	4	145	2	257	2nd place, silver medalist(s)

== Wrestling ==
Colombia qualified four wrestlers for each of the following classes into the Olympic competition. Tatiana Rentería qualified for the games by virtue of top five results through the 2023 World Championships in Belgrade, Serbia. Meanwhile, the others wrestler qualified for Paris 2024 qualified for the games after advancing to the final round at 2024 Pan American Olympic Qualification Tournament in Acapulco, Mexico.

Key:

- VT (ranking points: 5–0 or 0–5) – Victory by fall.
- VB (ranking points: 5–0 or 0–5) – Victory by injury (VF for forfeit, VA for withdrawal or disqualification)
- PP (ranking points: 3–1 or 1–3) – Decision by points – the loser with technical points.
- PO (ranking points: 3–0 or 0–3) – Decision by points – the loser without technical points.
- ST (ranking points: 4–0 or 0–4) – Great superiority – the loser without technical points and a margin of victory of at least 8 (Greco-Roman) or 10 (freestyle) points.
- SP (ranking points: 4–1 or 1–4) – Technical superiority – the loser with technical points and a margin of victory of at least 8 (Greco-Roman) or 10 (freestyle) points.

Freestyle
Women

Athlete	Event	Round of 16	Quarterfinal	Semifinal	Repechage	Final / BM	
Athlete	Event	Opposition Result	Opposition Result	Opposition Result	Opposition Result	Opposition Result	Rank
Alisson Cardozo	50 kg	Dilyté (LTU); L 0–6 ^{VT}	Did not advance				12
Tatiana Rentería	76 kg	Sghaiber (TUN); W 8–4 ^{PP}	Davaanasan (MGL); W 6–3 ^{PP}	Kagami (JPN); L 2–4 ^{PP}	Bye	Reasco (ECU); W 2–1 ^{PP}	3rd place, bronze medalist(s)

Greco-Roman

Athlete	Event	Round of 16	Quarterfinals	Semifinals	Repechage	Final / BM	
Athlete	Event	Opposition Result	Opposition Result	Opposition Result	Opposition Result	Opposition Result	Rank
Jair Cuero	77 kg	Zhadrayev (KAZ); L 0–9 ^{ST}	Did not advance		Makhmudov (KGZ); L 0–9 ^{ST}	Did not advance	15
Carlos Muñoz	87 kg	Mohmadi (IRN); L 0–9 ^{ST}	Did not advance		Kułynycz (POL); L 1–3 ^{PP}	Did not advance	15

== See also ==
- Colombia at the 2023 Pan American Games
- Colombia at the 2024 Winter Youth Olympics
- Colombia at the 2024 Summer Paralympics
