= Gymnastics at the 2026 Asian Games – Men's artistic individual all-around =

Men's individual all-around at the 2026 Asian Games
- Venue: Nippon Gaishi Hall Rainbow Hall
- Date: 21 September 2026

Medalists
| gold medal | Zhang Boheng | China |
| silver medal | Shinnosuke Oka | Japan |
| bronze medal | Daiki Hashimoto | Japan |

The men's artistic individual all-around competition at the 2026 Asian Games was held on 21 September 2026 at the Nippon Gaishi Hall Rainbow Hall.

== Schedule ==
All times are Japan Standard Time (UTC+09:00)

| Date | Time | Event |
|---|---|---|
| Monday, 21 September 2026 | 10:00 | Final |

== Results ==
The all-around final was held with no prior qualification round, therefore all athletes were eligible to participate. Only two gymnasts per NOC were eligible for placement.

| Rank | Athlete | Floor (gymnastics) | Pommel horse | Rings (gymnastics) | Vault (gymnastics) | Parallel bars | Horizontal bar | Total |
|---|---|---|---|---|---|---|---|---|
| 1st place, gold medalist(s) | Zhang Boheng (CHN) | 13.800 | 14.166 | 14.233 | 14.133 | 14.700 | 14.033 | 85.065 |
| 2nd place, silver medalist(s) | Shinnosuke Oka (JPN) | 13.833 | 13.766 | 14.000 | 14.233 | 14.633 | 14.233 | 84.698 |
| 3rd place, bronze medalist(s) | Daiki Hashimoto (JPN) | 13.433 | 14.500 | 13.733 | 13.866 | 14.300 | 14.033 | 83.865 |
| 4 | Sun Wei (CHN) | 13.900 | 14.200 | 13.766 | 14.166 | 13.333 | 13.933 | 83.298 |
| – | Shoma Tsukiyama (JPN) | 14.166 | 14.266 | 12.733 | 13.966 | 12.500 | 14.266 | 81.897 |
| 5 | Kim Jae-ho (KOR) | 13.766 | 11.766 | 12.733 | 14.466 | 13.666 | 12.800 | 79.197 |
| 6 | Lee Jung-hyo (KOR) | 12.433 | 14.000 | 13.600 | 12.266 | 13.433 | 11.766 | 77.498 |
| 7 | Eldrew Yulo (PHI) | 13.966 | 11.733 | 11.666 | 14.300 | 12.166 | 13.433 | 77.264 |
| 8 | Nurtan Idrissov (KAZ) | 12.600 | 11.200 | 13.266 | 13.866 | 13.300 | 12.733 | 76.965 |
| 9 | Carlos Yulo (PHI) | 14.600 | 8.233 | 13.500 | 13.166 | 14.266 | 11.700 | 75.465 |
| 10 | Hung Yuan-hsi (TPE) | 12.300 | 13.066 | 12.466 | 13.500 | 12.833 | 11.200 | 75.365 |
| 11 | Chuang Chia-lung (TPE) | 12.966 | 13.400 | 11.100 | 13.500 | 12.466 | 11.666 | 75.098 |
| 12 | Ilyas Azizov (KAZ) | 12.500 | 12.900 | 12.933 | 14.100 | 13.233 | 9.333 | 74.999 |
| 13 | Trần Đình Vương (VIE) | 11.366 | 12.733 | 11.866 | 12.400 | 13.133 | 12.233 | 73.731 |
| 14 | Usukhbayar Erkhembayar (MGL) | 13.433 | 12.266 | 11.900 | 12.966 | 11.733 | 11.433 | 73.731 |
| 15 | Suphacheep Baobenmad (THA) | 12.100 | 11.966 | 12.366 | 12.100 | 11.666 | 12.133 | 72.331 |
| – | Miguel Besana (PHI) | 13.133 | 8.966 | 10.900 | 14.066 | 11.233 | 12.600 | 70.898 |
| 16 | Asher Pua (SGP) | 11.300 | 11.400 | 10.066 | 12.733 | 11.733 | 11.766 | 68.998 |
| 17 | Đỗ Nam Anh (VIE) | 10.466 | 10.100 | 10.333 | 11.700 | 11.866 | 12.133 | 66.598 |
| 18 | Cameron Cole Pefianco (SGP) | 10.566 | 9.466 | 11.600 | 11.966 | 11.466 | 11.500 | 66.564 |
| – | Alfonso Tan You An (SGP) | 10.600 | 9.833 | 10.733 | 11.433 | 10.333 | 10.766 | 63.698 |
| – | Ryu Sung-hyun (KOR) | 14.566 | 12.900 | 13.066 | 12.733 | – | 13.533 | DNF |
| – | Milad Karimi (KAZ) | 13.833 | 13.000 | – | – | 13.333 | 13.133 | DNF |
