= Gymnastics at the 2024 Summer Olympics – Men's horizontal bar =

Men's horizontal bar at the Games of the XXXIII Olympiad
- Olympic artistic gymnastics
- Venue: Accor Arena
- Date: 27 July 2024 (qualifying); 5 August 2024 (final)
- Competitors: 11 from 9 nations

Medalists
1st place, gold medalist(s)		Shinnosuke Oka	Japan
2nd place, silver medalist(s)		Ángel Barajas	Colombia
3rd place, bronze medalist(s)		Zhang Boheng	China
3rd place, bronze medalist(s)		Tang Chia-hung	Chinese Taipei

The men's horizontal bar event at the 2024 Summer Olympics was held on 27 July and 5 August 2024 at the Accor Arena (referred to as the Bercy Arena due to IOC sponsorship rules).

== Qualification ==
Rank	Gymnast	D Score	E Score	Pen.	Total	Qual.
1	Zhang Boheng (CHN)	6.5	8.633		15.133	Q
2	Tang Chia-hung (TPE)	6.3	8.633		14.933	Q
3	Takaaki Sugino (JPN)	6.6	8.133		14.733	Q
4	Tin Srbić (CRO)	6.3	8.300		14.600	Q
5	Shinnosuke Oka (JPN)	5.9	8.633		14.533	Q
6	Ángel Barajas (COL)	6.7	7.766		14.466	Q
7	Su Weide (CHN)	6.0	8.400		14.400	Q
8	Marios Georgiou (CYP)	5.9	8.466		14.366	Q
9	Yumin Abbadini (ITA)	5.9	8.300		14.200	R1
10	Joe Fraser (GBR)	6.4	7.800		14.200	R2
11	Fred Richard (USA)	5.8	8.366		14.166	R3

== Final ==
Rank	Gymnast	D Score	E Score	Pen.	Total
1st place, gold medalist(s)	Shinnosuke Oka (JPN)	5.9	8.633		14.533
2nd place, silver medalist(s)	Ángel Barajas (COL)	6.6	7.933		14.533
3rd place, bronze medalist(s)	Tang Chia-hung (TPE)	6.5	7.466		13.966
3rd place, bronze medalist(s)	Zhang Boheng (CHN)	6.5	7.466		13.966
5	Su Weide (CHN)	6.0	7.433		13.433
6	Marios Georgiou (CYP)	5.9	7.433		13.333
7	Takaaki Sugino (JPN)	5.8	5.833		12.266
8	Tin Srbić (CRO)	5.5	5.833		11.333
