= Hur Woong (gymnast) =

South Korean artistic gymnast

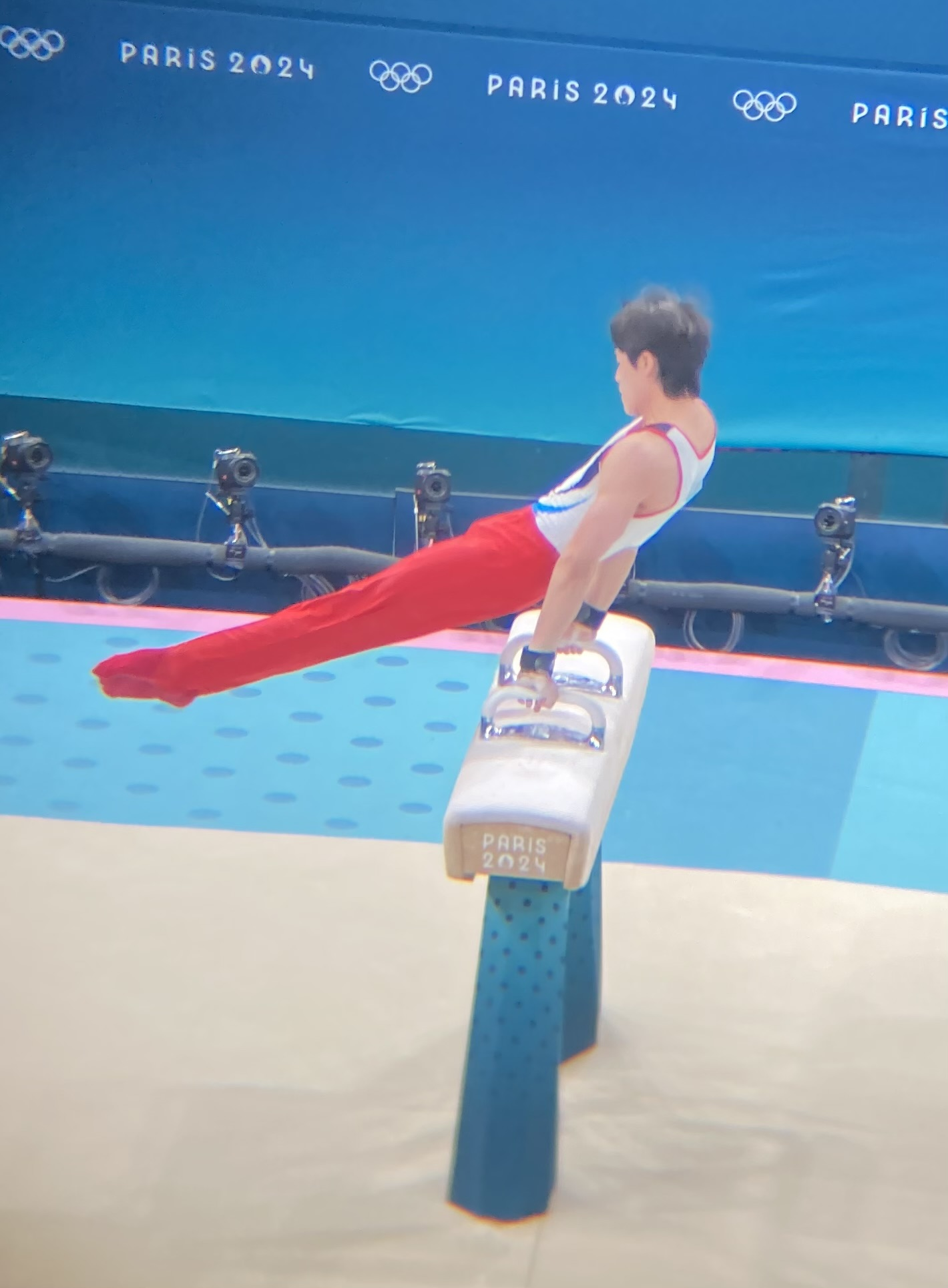
- Hur at the 2024 Olympic Games

Personal information
- Full name: Hur Woong
- Born: 18 December 1999 (age 26) Seoul, South Korea
- Height: 177 cm (5 ft 10 in)

Gymnastics career
- Discipline: Men's artistic gymnastics
- Country represented: South Korea; (2019–present)
- Club: Jecheon
Medal record
Representing South Korea
Artistic Gymnastics
Asian Championships
Silver medal – second place	2025 Jecheon	Pommel Horse
Bronze medal – third place	2024 Tashkent	Team
Bronze medal – third place	2026 Zunyi	Team
FIG World Cup
Event / 1st / 2nd / 3rd; ApparatusWorld Cup / 0 / 1 / 1

Hur Woong (Korean: 허웅; born 18 December 1999) is a South Korean male artistic gymnast and a member of the national team. He was part of the bronze medal-winning team at the 2024 Asian Championships. He represented South Korea at the 2024 Summer Olympics.

== Early life ==
Hur was born in Seoul in 1999.

== Gymnastics career ==
In early 2024 Hur began competing at the World Cups in hopes of qualifying to the 2024 Olympic Games. He first competed at the Cairo World Cup where he won silver on pommel horse behind Ahmad Abu Al-Soud of Jordan. He next competed at the Cottbus World Cup where he won bronze on pommel horse behind Nariman Kurbanov and Al-Soud. At the World Cup in Baku Hur fell during his routine and did not advance to the event final. He did not compete at the fourth and final World Cup in the series and therefore did not earn an Olympic berth.

In April Hur competed at the Korean Championships where he finished second in the all-around behind Lee Jun-ho and first on pommel horse. The following month Hur competed at the Asian Championships where he helped South Korea win bronze as a team. In June the Korea Gymnastics Association awarded Kim Han-sol the non-nominative Olympic berth that they had been awarded at the 2023 World Championships. However, the following month Kim injured his knee while training and would no longer be able to compete at the 2024 Olympic Games. The Korea Gymnastics Association chose Hur as the replacement athlete. While there Hur qualified to the pommel horse final where he finished seventh.

== Competitive history ==
Year	Event	Team	AA	FX	PH	SR	VT	PB	HB
2019	Cottbus World Cup				27			30	
2023	Cottbus World Cup				10				
2024	Cairo World Cup				2nd place, silver medalist(s)				
2024	Cottbus World Cup				3rd place, bronze medalist(s)				
2024	Baku World Cup				19				
2024	Korean Championships		2nd place, silver medalist(s)		1st place, gold medalist(s)				
2024	Asian Championships	3rd place, bronze medalist(s)							
2024	Olympic Games				7				
2025
2025	Asian Championships	4			2nd place, silver medalist(s)				
2026
2026	Asian Championships	3rd place, bronze medalist(s)							
2026	Asian Games	5							
