= Gymnastics at the 2024 Summer Olympics – Men's parallel bars =

Olympic gymnastics event

Men's parallel bars at the Games of the XXXIII Olympiad
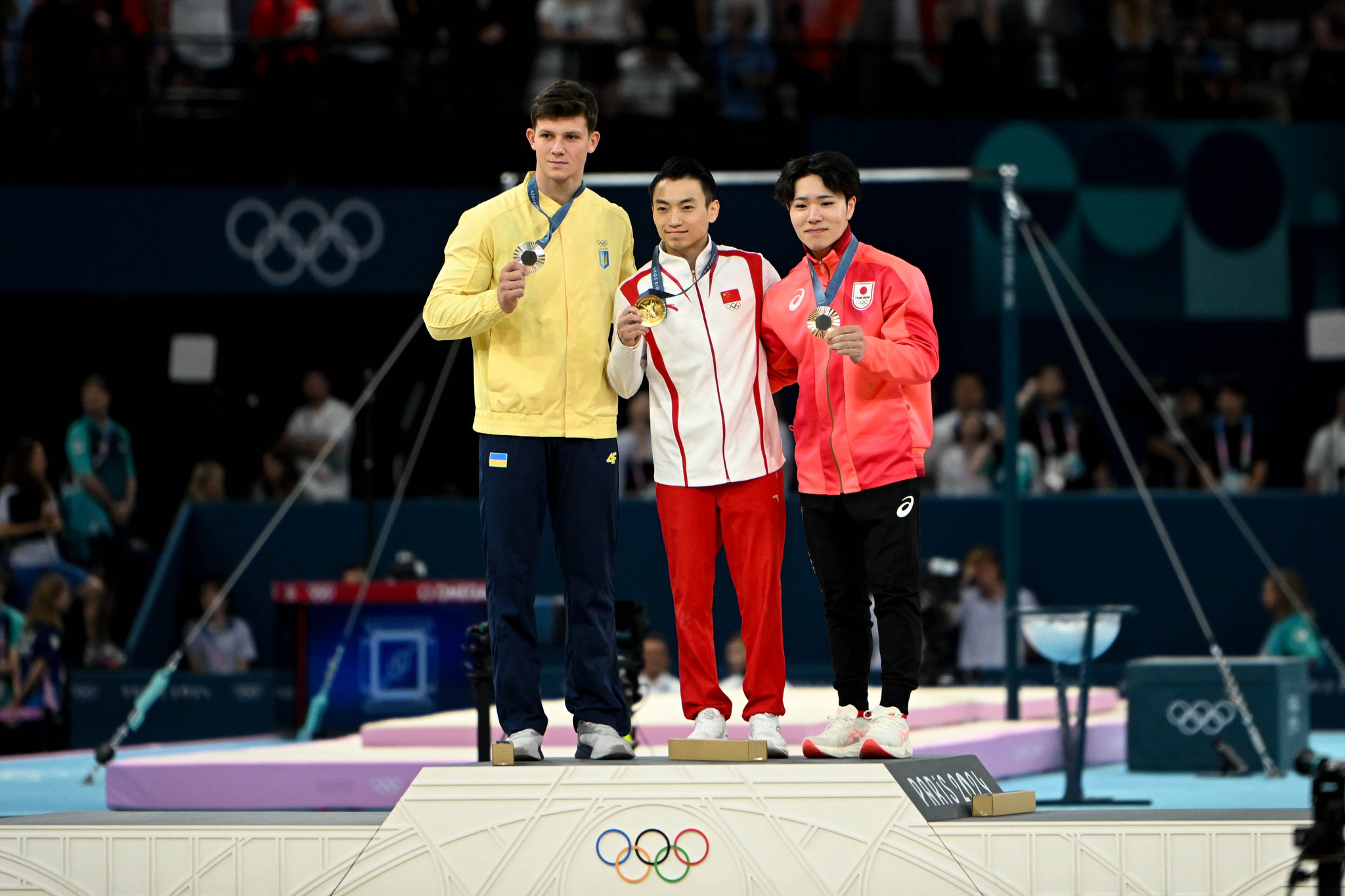
- Kovtun, Zou, and Oka on the medal podium
- Venue: Accor Arena
- Date: 27 July 2024 (qualifying); 5 August 2024 (final)
- Competitors: 8 from 5 nations
- Winning score: 16.200

Medalists
1st place, gold medalist(s)		Zou Jingyuan	China
2nd place, silver medalist(s)		Illia Kovtun	Ukraine
3rd place, bronze medalist(s)		Shinnosuke Oka	Japan

The men's parallel bars event at the 2024 Summer Olympics was held on 27 July and 5 August 2024 at the Accor Arena (referred to as the Bercy Arena due to IOC sponsorship rules).

== Competition Format ==
The top 8 qualifiers (limit two per NOC) for parallel bars advanced to the apparatus finals.

== Schedule ==
The competition was held over two days, 27 July and 5 August. The qualifying round (for all men's gymnastics events) was on the first day with the apparatus final on the second day.

Date	Time	Round	Subdivision
27 July	11:00	Qualification	Subdivision 1
27 July	15:30	Qualification	Subdivision 2
27 July	20:00	Qualification	Subdivision 3
5 August	11:45	Final	–
All times are Central European Summer Time (UTC+2)

== Qualification ==
Rank	Gymnast	D Score	E Score	Pen.	Total	Qual.
1	Zou Jingyuan (CHN)	6.9	9.300		16.200	Q
2	Zhang Boheng (CHN)	6.4	8.933		15.333	Q
3	Shinnosuke Oka (JPN)	6.5	8.800		15.300	Q
4	Oleg Verniaiev (UKR)	6.6	8.666		15.266	Q
5	Lukas Dauser (GER)	6.6	8.566		15.166	Q
6	Illia Kovtun (UKR)	6.7	8.466		15.166	Q
7	Ferhat Arıcan (TUR)	6.9	8.133		15.033	Q
8	Wataru Tanigawa (JPN)	6.3	8.700		15.000	Q
9	Kaya Kazuma (JPN)	6.3	8.633		14.933	–
10	Joe Fraser (GBR)	6.5	8.433		14.933	R1
11	Daiki Hashimoto (JPN)	6.1	8.733		14.833	–
12	Xiao Ruoteng (CHN)	6.0	8.800		14.800	–
13	Krisztofer Mészáros (HUN)	6.4	8.333		14.733	R2
14	Ángel Barajas (COL)	6.7	8.000		14.700	R3

Reserves

The reserves for the men's parallel bars final were:

1. Joe Fraser (GBR)
2. Krisztofer Mészáros (HUN)
3. Ángel Barajas (COL)

Only two gymnasts from each country may advance to the event final. Therefore, Japanese gymnasts Kaya Kazuma and Daiki Hashimoto and Chinese gymnast Xiao Ruoteng would be excluded as reserves unless another gymnast of their nation was to drop out.

== Final ==
Rank	Gymnast	D Score	E Score	Pen.	Total
1st place, gold medalist(s)	Zou Jingyuan (CHN)	6.900	9.300		16.200
2nd place, silver medalist(s)	Illia Kovtun (UKR)	7.000	8.500		15.500
3rd place, bronze medalist(s)	Shinnosuke Oka (JPN)	6.500	8.800		15.300
4	Zhang Boheng (CHN)	6.400	8.700		15.100
5	Ferhat Arıcan (TUR)	6.900	8.200		15.100
6	Wataru Tanigawa (JPN)	6.300	7.833		14.133
7	Lukas Dauser (GER)	6.000	7.700		13.700
8	Oleg Verniaiev (UKR)	6.200	7.100		13.300
