= 2025 Asian Men's Artistic Gymnastics Championships =

Gymnastics event in South Korea

2025 Asian Artistic Gymnastics Championships
- Venue: Jecheon Gymnasium
- Location: Jecheon, South Korea
- Start date: 5 June 2025
- End date: 8 June 2025

The 2025 Asian Men's Artistic Gymnastics Championships is the 12th edition of the Asian Artistic Gymnastics Championships, and is being held in Jecheon, South Korea from 5 to 8 June 2025.

== Participating countries ==
- Bangladesh
- China
- Chinese Taipei
- Hong Kong
- India
- Indonesia
- Iran
- Japan
- Kazakhstan
- Kyrgyzstan
- Malaysia
- Philippines
- Qatar
- Singapore
- South Korea
- Sri Lanka
- Thailand
- Uzbekistan
- Vietnam

== Medal summary ==
Event	Gold	Silver	Bronze
Senior
Team all-around	Japan; Shumpei Fujimaki; Tsuyoshi Hasegawa; Kazuma Kaya; Shinnosuke Oka; Tomoharu Tsunogai	China; Huang Mingqi; Lan Xingyu; Shi Cong; Tian Hao; Yang Haonan	Kazakhstan; Ilyas Azizov; Milad Karimi; Nariman Kurbanov; Roman Mamenov; Dmitriy Patanin
Individual all-around	(Japan) Shinnosuke Oka	(Japan) Tsuyoshi Hasegawa	(Philippines) Carlos Yulo
Floor exercise	(Philippines) Carlos Yulo	(Kazakhstan) Milad Karimi	(South Korea) Moon Geon-young
Pommel horse	(Kazakhstan) Nariman Kurbanov	(South Korea) Hur Woong	(Vietnam) Đặng Ngọc Xuân Thiện
Rings	(China) Lan Xingyu	(China) Yang Haonan	(Iran) Siavash Siahi
Vault	(Iran) Mahdi Olfati	(China) Huang Mingqi	(Philippines) Carlos Yulo
Parallel bars	(Japan) Shinnosuke Oka	(Japan) Tomoharu Tsunogai	(Philippines) Carlos Yulo
Horizontal bar	(Chinese Taipei) Tang Chia-hung	(Japan) Tomoharu Tsunogai	(China) Tian Hao
Junior
Team all-around	Japan; Harutoshi Ochiai; Nao Ojima; Tomoharu Tanida; Daiki Yokoyama	South Korea; An Dae-geon; Bak Jun-woo; Cha Ye-jun; Hwang Ui-beom; Jeong Kang-woo	Kazakhstan; Vladislav Babushkin; Nurtan Idrissov; Roman Khegay; Artyom Kovalyov; Andrey Terman
Individual all-around	(Japan) Nao Ojima	(South Korea) Cha Ye-jun	(Japan) Tomoharu Tanida
Floor exercise	(Japan) Nao Ojima	(South Korea) Bak Jun-woo (South Korea) Cha Ye-jun	Not awarded
Pommel horse	(Kazakhstan) Roman Khegay	(Kazakhstan) Nurtan Idrissov	(Japan) Harutoshi Ochiai
Rings	(South Korea) Cha Ye-jun	(Iran) Amirmohammad Rahmanizou (Japan) Daiki Yokoyama	Not awarded
Vault	(South Korea) Bak Jun-woo	(Philippines) Eldrew Yulo	(South Korea) An Dae-geon
Parallel bars	(Kazakhstan) Nurtan Idrissov	(South Korea) Cha Ye-jun	(Japan) Tomoharu Tanida
Horizontal bar	(Japan) Nao Ojima	(Japan) Tomoharu Tanida	(South Korea) Cha Ye-jun

== Medal table ==
=== Overall ===
* Host nation (South Korea)

Rank	Nation	Gold	Silver	Bronze	Total
1	Japan	7	5	3	15
2	Kazakhstan	3	2	2	7
3	South Korea*	2	6	3	11
4	China	1	3	1	5
5	Philippines	1	1	3	5
6	Iran	1	1	1	3
7	Chinese Taipei	1	0	0	1
8	Vietnam	0	0	1	1
Totals (8 entries)		16	18	14	48

=== Senior ===
* Host nation (South Korea)

Rank	Nation	Gold	Silver	Bronze	Total
1	Japan	3	3	0	6
2	China	1	3	1	5
3	Kazakhstan	1	1	1	3
4	Philippines	1	0	3	4
5	Iran	1	0	1	2
6	Chinese Taipei	1	0	0	1
7	South Korea*	0	1	1	2
8	Vietnam	0	0	1	1
Totals (8 entries)		8	8	8	24

=== Junior ===
* Host nation (South Korea)

Rank	Nation	Gold	Silver	Bronze	Total
1	Japan	4	2	3	9
2	South Korea*	2	5	2	9
3	Kazakhstan	2	1	1	4
4	Iran	0	1	0	1
4	Philippines	0	1	0	1
Totals (5 entries)		8	10	6	24

== Senior results ==
=== Individual all-around ===
21 gymnasts took part in the individual all-around competition with no prior qualification round. The following is the top 8 of the all-around.

Rank	Gymnast	Floor (gymnastics)	Pommel horse	Rings (gymnastics)	Vault (gymnastics)	Parallel bars	Horizontal bar	Total
1st place, gold medalist(s)	(Japan) Shinnosuke Oka	14.333	13.866	14.000	13.866	14.666	14.400	85.131
2nd place, silver medalist(s)	(Japan) Tsuyoshi Hasegawa	13.900	14.133	13.500	14.166	14.066	14.200	83.965
3rd place, bronze medalist(s)	(Philippines) Carlos Yulo	14.433	13.100	13.633	14.500	14.166	13.800	83.632
4	(China) Yang Haonan	13.300	13.733	13.933	14.433	13.966	13.600	82.965
5	(Kazakhstan) Ilyas Azizov	13.566	13.933	12.566	13.766	13.000	13.100	79.931
6	(China) Tian Hao	11.700	13.466	12.933	13.800	12.800	14.733	79.432
7	(South Korea) Lee Jung-hyo	13.000	13.366	13.366	13.800	13.433	12.266	79.231
8	(South Korea) Moon Geon-young	13.266	12.200	12.266	14.466	14.400	12.366	78.964

=== Floor ===
Rank	Gymnast	D Score	E Score	Pen.	Bon.	Total
1st place, gold medalist(s)	(Philippines) Carlos Yulo	5.700	8.800	0.000	0.100	14.600
2nd place, silver medalist(s)	(Kazakhstan) Milad Karimi	5.700	8.600	0.000	0.100	14.400
3rd place, bronze medalist(s)	(South Korea) Moon Geon-young	5.600	8.633	0.300	0.100	14.033
4	(Kazakhstan) Dmitriy Patanin	5.200	8.633	0.000	0.000	13.833
5	(Japan) Tsuyoshi Hasegawa	5.000	8.533	0.000	0.000	13.533
6	(Chinese Taipei) Hung Yuan-hsi	4.800	8.700	0.000	0.000	13.500
7	(Japan) Shinnosuke Oka	5.400	8.200	0.300	0.000	13.300
8	(Chinese Taipei) Yeh Cheng	4.700	6.366	0.000	0.000	11.066

=== Pommel horse ===
Rank	Gymnast	D Score	E Score	Pen.	Bon.	Total
1st place, gold medalist(s)	(Kazakhstan) Nariman Kurbanov	6.200	8.733	0.000	0.000	14.933
2nd place, silver medalist(s)	(South Korea) Hur Woong	5.900	8.733	0.000	0.000	14.633
3rd place, bronze medalist(s)	(Vietnam) Đặng Ngọc Xuân Thiện	5.700	8.533	0.000	0.000	14.233
4	(Chinese Taipei) Shiao Yu-Jan	5.500	8.566	0.000	0.000	14.066
5	(Kazakhstan) Ilyas Azizov	5.300	8.633	0.000	0.000	13.933
6	(Japan) Shinnosuke Oka	4.900	8.700	0.000	0.000	13.600
7	(Qatar) Rakan Al-Harith	5.000	8.566	0.000	0.000	13.566
8	(Japan) Tsuyoshi Hasegawa	5.500	7.200	0.000	0.000	12.700

=== Rings ===
Rank	Gymnast	D Score	E Score	Pen.	Bon.	Total
1st place, gold medalist(s)	(China) Lan Xingyu	5.900	8.933	0.000	0.100	14.933
2nd place, silver medalist(s)	(China) Yang Haonan	5.200	8.933	0.000	0.100	14.233
3rd place, bronze medalist(s)	(Iran) Siavash Siahi	5.200	8.933	0.000	0.000	14.133
4	(Japan) Shinnosuke Oka	5.300	8.633	0.000	0.100	14.033
5	(Japan) Shumpei Fujimaki	5.100	8.666	0.000	0.100	13.866
6	(Vietnam) Nguyễn Văn Khánh Phong	5.200	8.500	0.000	0.000	13.700
7	(Philippines) Carlos Yulo	4.900	8.333	0.000	0.000	13.233
8	(South Korea) Lee Jung-hyo	5.100	7.633	0.000	0.000	12.733

=== Vault ===
Rank	Gymnast	Vault 1					Vault 2					Total
Rank	Gymnast	D Score	E Score	Pen.	Bon.	Score 1	D Score	E Score	Pen.	Bon.	Score 2	Total
1st place, gold medalist(s)	(Iran) Mahdi Olfati	5.600	9.066	0.000	0.000	14.666	5.200	9.133	0.000	0.000	14.333	14.500
2nd place, silver medalist(s)	(China) Huang Mingqi	5.600	9.000	0.000	0.000	14.600	5.200	9.100	0.100	0.000	14.200	14.400
3rd place, bronze medalist(s)	(Philippines) Carlos Yulo	5.200	9.333	0.000	0.000	14.533	5.200	8.933	0.000	0.000	14.133	14.333
4	(Hong Kong) Ng Ka Ki	5.200	9.233	0.000	0.000	14.433	5.200	8.866	0.000	0.000	14.066	14.250
5	(South Korea) Kim Jae-ho	5.200	9.133	0.000	0.000	14.333	4.800	9.266	0.000	0.000	14.066	14.200
6	(Philippines) John Ivan Cruz	5.200	9.333	0.000	0.100	14.633	4.800	8.866	0.000	0.000	13.666	14.150
7	(Uzbekistan) Abdulaziz Mirvaliev	5.200	7.966	0.000	0.000	13.166	5.200	8.800	0.000	0.000	14.000	13.583
8	(Chinese Taipei) Yeh Cheng	4.800	8.866	0.100	0.000	13.566	4.800	8.166	0.300	0.000	12.666	13.116

=== Parallel bars ===
Rank	Gymnast	D Score	E Score	Pen.	Bon.	Total
1st place, gold medalist(s)	(Japan) Shinnosuke Oka	5.600	9.000	0.000	0.100	14.700
2nd place, silver medalist(s)	(Japan) Tomoharu Tsunogai	5.700	8.766	0.000	0.000	14.466
3rd place, bronze medalist(s)	(Philippines) Carlos Yulo	5.500	8.566	0.000	0.100	14.166
4	(Vietnam) Đinh Phương Thành	5.300	8.766	0.000	0.000	14.066
5	(China) Shi Cong	5.100	8.800	0.000	0.000	13.900
6	(Uzbekistan) Rasuljon Abdurakhimov	4.800	8.866	0.000	0.000	13.666
7	(China) Yang Haonan	5.000	8.533	0.000	0.000	13.533
8	(South Korea) Moon Geon-young	5.600	7.500	0.000	0.000	13.100

=== Horizontal bar ===
Rank	Gymnast	D Score	E Score	Pen.	Bon.	Total
1st place, gold medalist(s)	(Chinese Taipei) Tang Chia-hung	6.500	8.733	0.000	0.000	15.233
2nd place, silver medalist(s)	(Japan) Tomoharu Tsunogai	6.200	8.700	0.000	0.100	15.000
3rd place, bronze medalist(s)	(China) Tian Hao	6.200	8.500	0.000	0.000	14.700
4	(Japan) Shumpei Fujimaki	5.600	8.766	0.000	0.100	14.466
5	(China) Shi Cong	5.100	8.966	0.000	0.100	14.166
6	(Kazakhstan) Milad Karimi	5.800	7.566	0.000	0.000	13.366
7	(Philippines) Carlos Yulo	4.800	7.200	0.000	0.000	12.000
8	(South Korea) Kim Jae-ho	4.000	7.600	0.000	0.000	11.600

== Junior results ==
=== Individual all-around ===
Rank	Gymnast	Floor (gymnastics)	Pommel horse	Rings (gymnastics)	Vault (gymnastics)	Parallel bars	Horizontal bar	Total
1st place, gold medalist(s)	(Japan) Nao Ojima	13.400	12.933	12.766	13.866	13.500	13.000	79.465
2nd place, silver medalist(s)	(South Korea) Cha Ye-jun	13.666	12.166	12.600	13.566	13.833	13.133	78.964
3rd place, bronze medalist(s)	(Japan) Tomoharu Tanida	13.300	12.566	12.400	13.433	13.466	13.200	78.365
4	(Kazakhstan) Roman Khegay	12.966	13.733	11.866	13.400	13.633	12.633	78.231
5	(South Korea) Bak Jun-woo	13.733	10.900	12.433	13.666	13.166	12.633	76.531
6	(Kazakhstan) Nurtan Idrissov	13.200	13.000	13.000	12.066	13.666	11.533	76.465
7	(Philippines) Eldrew Yulo	13.533	12.633	11.933	13.066	11.800	12.733	75.698
8	(Iran) Abolfazl Nikkhoualamshiri	12.500	12.500	13.000	12.133	12.333	12.366	74.832

=== Floor ===
Rank	Gymnast	D Score	E Score	Pen.	Bon.	Total
1st place, gold medalist(s)	(Japan) Nao Ojima	5.100	8.700	0.000	0.100	13.900
2nd place, silver medalist(s)	(South Korea) Cha Ye-jun	5.300	8.266	0.100	0.000	13.466
2nd place, silver medalist(s)	(South Korea) Bak Jun-woo	5.000	8.366	0.000	0.100	13.466
4	(Japan) Harutoshi Ochiai	4.900	8.000	0.100	0.000	12.800
5	(Hong Kong) Cheung Ching	4.900	7.966	0.200	0.000	12.666
6	(Philippines) Eldrew Yulo	5.300	7.366	0.400	0.000	12.266
7	(Chinese Taipei) Cheng Cheng-Yu	4.600	7.366	0.000	0.100	12.066
8	(Kazakhstan) Nurtan Idrissov	4.900	6.000	0.000	0.100	11.000

=== Pommel horse ===
Rank	Gymnast	D Score	E Score	Pen.	Bon.	Total
1st place, gold medalist(s)	(Kazakhstan) Roman Khegay	5.200	8.600	0.000	0.000	13.800
2nd place, silver medalist(s)	(Kazakhstan) Nurtan Idrissov	4.700	8.166	0.000	0.000	12.866
3rd place, bronze medalist(s)	(Japan) Harutoshi Ochiai	4.400	8.266	0.000	0.000	12.666
4	(Philippines) Eldrew Yulo	4.500	8.100	0.000	0.000	12.600
5	(Uzbekistan) Mansur Rahmatov	4.200	8.266	0.000	0.000	12.466
6	(Japan) Nao Ojima	4.100	8.133	0.000	0.000	12.233
7	(Malaysia) Tan Yu Hang Anson	4.800	6.933	0.000	0.000	11.733
8	(Uzbekistan) Timur Kamaev	3.600	6.866	0.000	0.000	10.466
9	(Singapore) Xavier Pang	3.200	6.766	0.000	0.000	9.966

=== Rings ===
Rank	Gymnast	D Score	E Score	Pen.	Bon.	Total
1st place, gold medalist(s)	(South Korea) Cha Ye-jun	4.500	8.500	0.000	0.000	13.000
2nd place, silver medalist(s)	(Iran) Amirmohammad Rahmanizou	4.700	8.266	0.000	0.000	12.966
2nd place, silver medalist(s)	(Japan) Daiki Yokoyama	4.800	8.166	0.000	0.000	12.966
4	(Kazakhstan) Nurtan Idrissov	4.800	8.100	0.000	0.000	12.900
5	(South Korea) Bak Jun-woo	4.200	8.466	0.000	0.000	12.666
6	(Japan) Nao Ojima	4.700	7.933	0.000	0.000	12.633
7	(Chinese Taipei) Li Hong-Wen	3.700	8.466	0.000	0.100	12.266
8	(Iran) Abolfazl Nikkhoualamshiri	4.400	7.200	0.000	0.000	11.600

=== Vault ===
Rank	Gymnast	Vault 1					Vault 2					Total
Rank	Gymnast	D Score	E Score	Pen.	Bon.	Score 1	D Score	E Score	Pen.	Bon.	Score 2	Total
1st place, gold medalist(s)	(South Korea) Bak Jun-woo	4.800	9.233	0.000	0.000	14.033	4.400	9.333	0.000	0.100	13.833	13.933
2nd place, silver medalist(s)	(Philippines) Eldrew Yulo	4.800	9.100	0.000	0.000	13.900	4.400	9.400	0.000	0.000	13.800	13.850
3rd place, bronze medalist(s)	(South Korea) An Dae-geon	4.800	8.766	0.000	0.000	13.566	4.800	9.200	0.000	0.000	14.000	13.783
4	(Hong Kong) Cheung Ching	4.800	8.833	0.100	0.000	13.533	4.400	8.733	0.000	0.000	13.133	13.333
5	(India) Harschit Damodharan	4.800	7.833	0.100	0.000	12.533	4.400	8.766	0.000	0.000	13.166	12.849
6	(India) Akshat Bajaj	4.400	8.200	0.000	0.000	12.600	4.400	8.666	0.000	0.000	13.066	12.833
6	(Kazakhstan) Nurtan Idrissov	4.800	7.800	0.100	0.000	12.500	4.400	8.766	0.000	0.000	13.166	12.833
8	(Chinese Taipei) Cheng Cheng-Yu	4.400	9.000	0.000	0.000	13.400	2.800	9.233	0.000	0.000	12.033	12.717

=== Parallel bars ===
Rank	Gymnast	D Score	E Score	Pen.	Bon.	Total
1st place, gold medalist(s)	(Kazakhstan) Nurtan Idrissov	5.000	8.833	0.000	0.100	13.933
2nd place, silver medalist(s)	(South Korea) Cha Ye-jun	4.900	8.833	0.000	0.100	13.833
3rd place, bronze medalist(s)	(Japan) Tomoharu Tanida	4.500	8.833	0.000	0.000	13.333
4	(Kazakhstan) Roman Khegay	4.500	8.733	0.000	0.000	13.233
5	(Vietnam) Kasim Halimyang	4.300	8.600	0.000	0.000	12.900
6	(Uzbekistan) Sarvar Abulfaizov	4.600	8.066	0.000	0.000	12.666
7	(Japan) Nao Ojima	3.900	7.966	0.000	0.000	11.866
8	(South Korea) Bak Jun-woo	4.300	6.233	0.000	0.100	10.633

=== Horizontal bar ===
Rank	Gymnast	D Score	E Score	Pen.	Bon.	Total
1st place, gold medalist(s)	(Japan) Nao Ojima	5.000	8.633	0.000	0.100	13.733
2nd place, silver medalist(s)	(Japan) Tomoharu Tanida	4.600	8.766	0.000	0.000	13.366
3rd place, bronze medalist(s)	(South Korea) Cha Ye-jun	4.400	8.566	0.000	0.000	12.966
4	(South Korea) Bak Jun-woo	4.200	8.533	0.000	0.000	12.733
4	(Chinese Taipei) Hsiao Yu-Lun	4.300	8.433	0.000	0.000	12.733
6	(Iran) Amirabbas Mojahed	4.100	8.466	0.000	0.000	12.566
7	(Kazakhstan) Roman Khegay	4.200	7.766	0.000	0.100	12.066
8	(Philippines) Eldrew Yulo	4.500	7.533	0.000	0.000	12.033
