= Shinnosuke Oka =

Japanese artistic gymnast (born 2003)

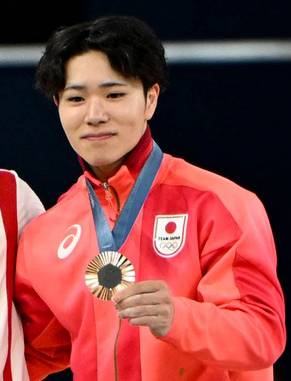
- Oka at the 2024 Summer Olympics

Personal information
- Born: 31 October 2003 (age 23) Okayama, Japan

Gymnastics career
- Discipline: Men's artistic gymnastics
- Country represented: Japan; (2018–present)
- Club: Tokushukai Gymnastics Club
- Head coach: Isao Yoneda
Medal record
Representing Japan
Men's artistic gymnastics
Olympic Games
| Gold medal – first place | 2024 Paris | Team |
| Gold medal – first place | 2024 Paris | All-around |
| Gold medal – first place | 2024 Paris | Horizontal bar |
| Bronze medal – third place | 2024 Paris | Parallel bars |
World Championships
| Gold medal – first place | 2026 Rotterdam | Team |
| Silver medal – second place | 2026 Rotterdam | Horizontal bar |
Asian Games
| Silver medal – second place | 2026 Aichi-Nagoya | Team |
| Silver medal – second place | 2026 Aichi-Nagoya | All-around |
| Silver medal – second place | 2026 Aichi-Nagoya | Parallel bars |
| Silver medal – second place | 2026 Aichi-Nagoya | Horizontal bar |
Asian Championships
| Gold medal – first place | 2023 Singapore | All-around |
| Gold medal – first place | 2025 Jecheon | Team |
| Gold medal – first place | 2025 Jecheon | All-around |
| Gold medal – first place | 2025 Jecheon | Parallel bars |
| Silver medal – second place | 2023 Singapore | Team |
| Silver medal – second place | 2023 Singapore | Parallel bars |
| Silver medal – second place | 2023 Singapore | Horizontal bar |
World University Games
| Gold medal – first place | 2025 Rhine-Ruhr | Team |
| Silver medal – second place | 2025 Rhine-Ruhr | Floor exercise |
| Silver medal – second place | 2025 Rhine-Ruhr | Parallel bars |
Junior World Championships
| Gold medal – first place | 2019 Győr | Team |
| Gold medal – first place | 2019 Győr | All-around |
| Silver medal – second place | 2019 Győr | Pommel horse |
| Bronze medal – third place | 2019 Győr | Parallel bars |

Shinnosuke Oka (岡 慎之助, Oka Shinnosuke; born 31 October 2003) is a Japanese artistic gymnast. He represented Japan at the 2024 Summer Olympics where he became the 2024 Olympic all-around champion; additionally he helped the Japanese team win gold in the team event and individually he won gold on horizontal bar and bronze on parallel bars. He is also the 2023 and 2025 Asian and the 2019 Junior World all-around champion.

== Early life ==
Oka was born on 31 October 2003 in Okayama to Yachiyo and Yasumasa Oka, and grew up in the Kojo region of Minami-ku, Okayama. He has a brother named Kyoiki. He began gymnastics when he was four years old. In 2019, he moved away from his family at age 16 to train at the Tokushukai Gymnastics Club in Kamakura.

== Career ==
=== Junior ===
Oka competed at the 2018 Junior Asian Championships where the Japanese team won the silver medal behind China. Individually, he won the all-around bronze medal behind Shi Cong and Yin Dehang. Then in the event finals, he won the gold medal on the horizontal bar and the silver medals on the floor exercise and parallel bars, and the bronze medal on the still rings.

Oka won two gold medals, one silver medal and one bronze medal at the 2019 Junior World Championships held in Győr, Hungary. On the first day, he won the gold medal both in the team and individual all-around events. Then in the first day of event finals, he won the silver medal on the pommel horse behind teammate Takeru Kitazono. Then on the final day, he won the bronze medal in the parallel bars behind Kitazono and China's Yang Haonan. He then placed eighth all-around at the 2019 All-Japan Junior Championships. At the 2020 All-Japan Championships, he finished 44th in the all-around.

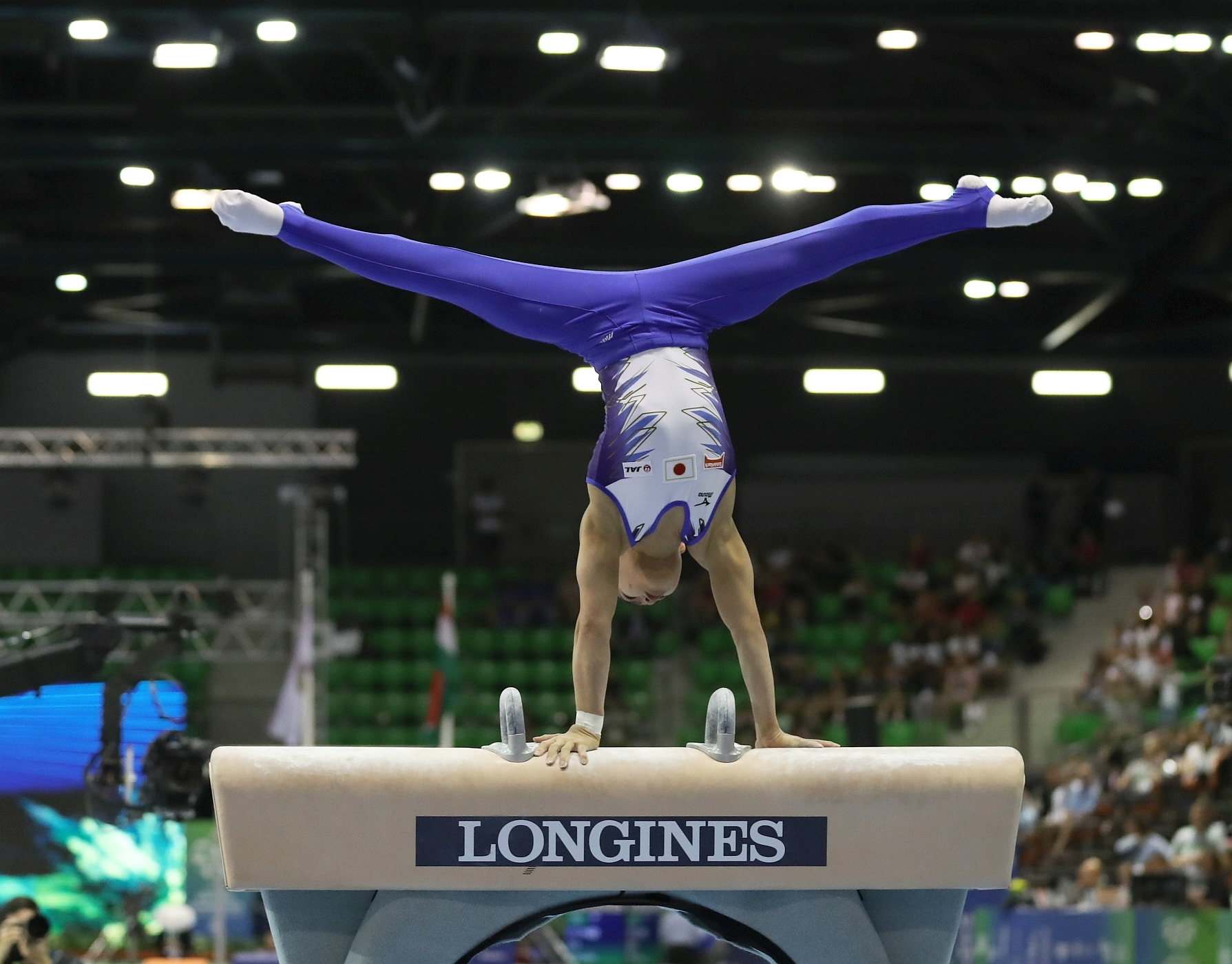
Pommel horse

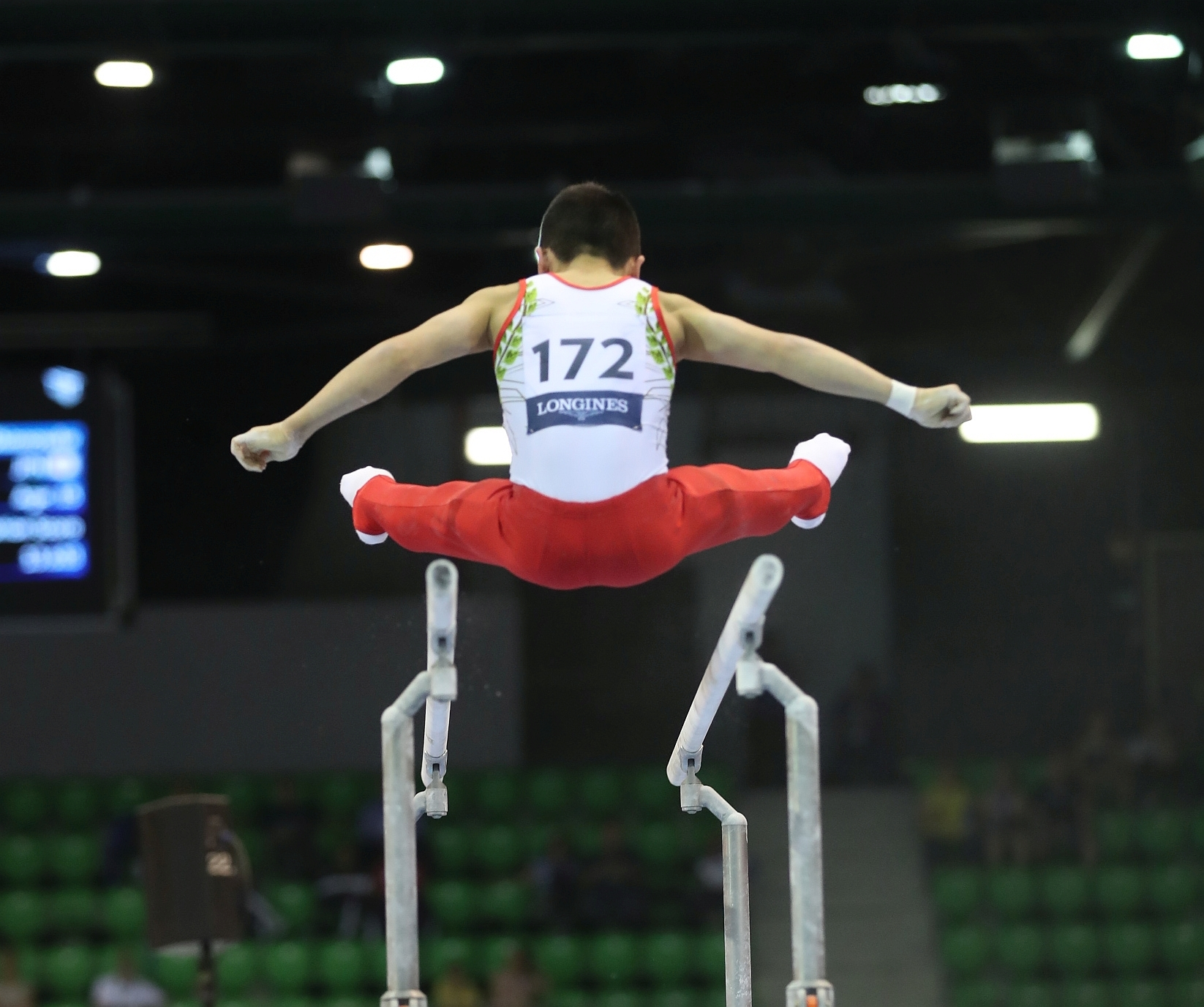
Parallel bars

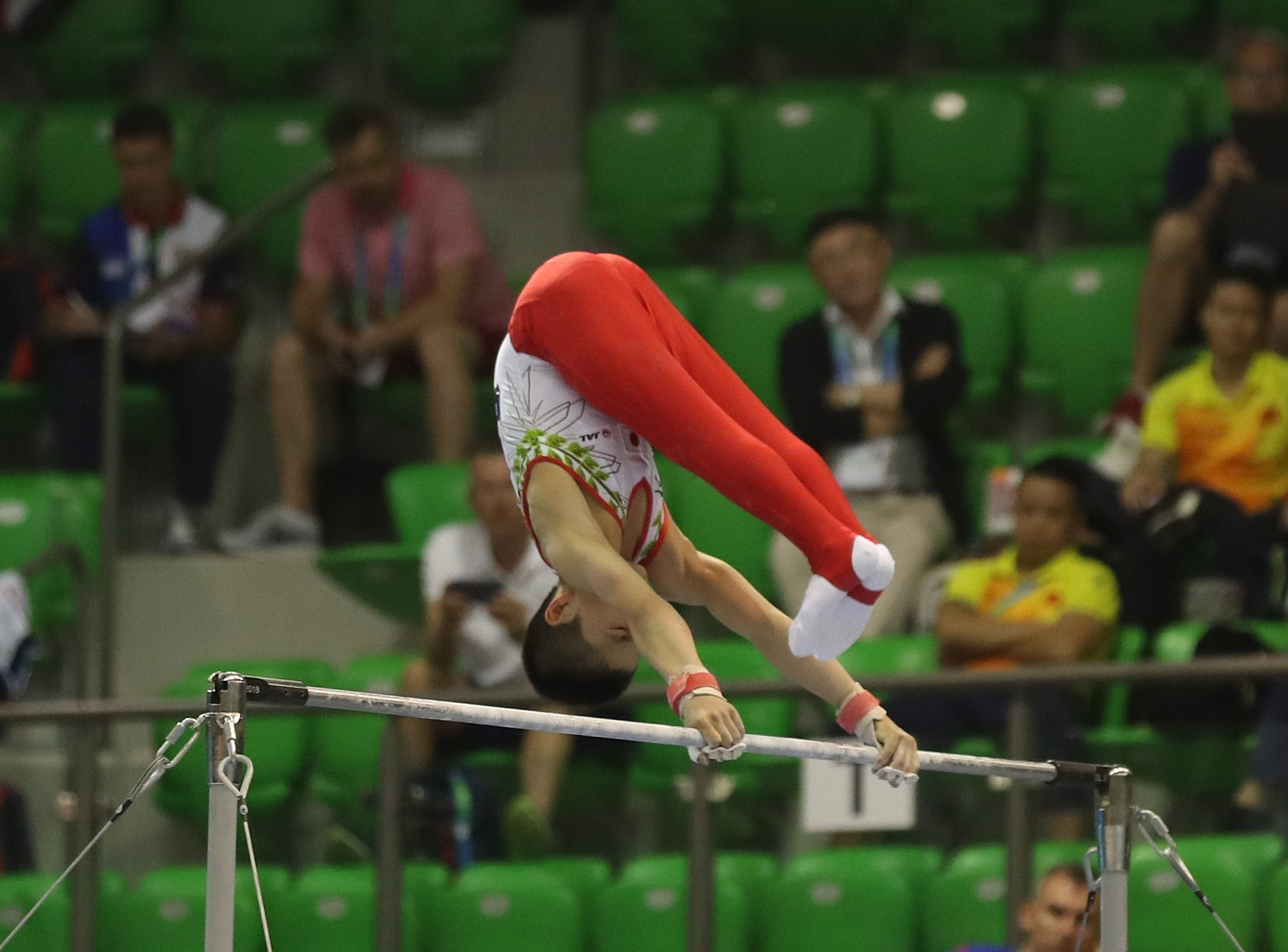
Horizontal bar

Oka at the 2019 Junior World Championships

=== Senior ===
Oka placed 60th in the all-around at the 2021 All-Japan Championships. He tore his right ACL at the 2022 All-Japan Championships.

Oka returned to competition at the 2023 All-Japan Championships and placed 10th in the all-around. He then finished 11th in the all-around at the NHK Trophy. Then at the 2023 All-Japan Event Championships, he won a bronze medal on the floor exercise. Oka won the all-around title at the 2023 Asian Championships in an upset over Carlos Yulo. The Japanese team won the silver medal behind China. In the event finals, Oka won silver medals on the parallel bars and the horizontal bar.

Oka began the 2024 season at the All-Japan Championships where he won the all-around silver medal behind Daiki Hashimoto. He then won the all-around title at the 2024 NHK Trophy and earned a place on Japan's 2024 Olympic team alongside Hashimoto, Kazuma Kaya, Takaaki Sugino, and Wataru Tanigawa. At the Olympic Games the Japanese team won the team gold on July 29, defeating long-time rival China. Oka went on to win gold medals in the individual all-around and horizontal bar, as well as a bronze medal in the parallel bars.

Oka competed at the 2025 Asian Championships where he helped Japan win gold as a team. Individually he also won gold in the all-around and on the parallel bars. Later in the summer he competed at the 2025 World University Games where he once again helped Japan win team gold. Individually he won two silver medals on floor exercise and parallel bars and placed sixth on horizontal bar. At the 2025 World Championships, Oka placed fifth in the all-around and seventh on parallel bars.

At the 2026 Asian Games, he won a silver in the all-around and helped Japan win silver as a team. At the 2026 World Championships, Oka helped the Japanese team to win the team gold. During the all-around final, Oka fell on both vault and horizontal bar and finished eighth overall. He bounced back during the horizontal bar final, earning a 14.800 to win the silver medal behind Tang Chia-hung.

== Competitive history ==
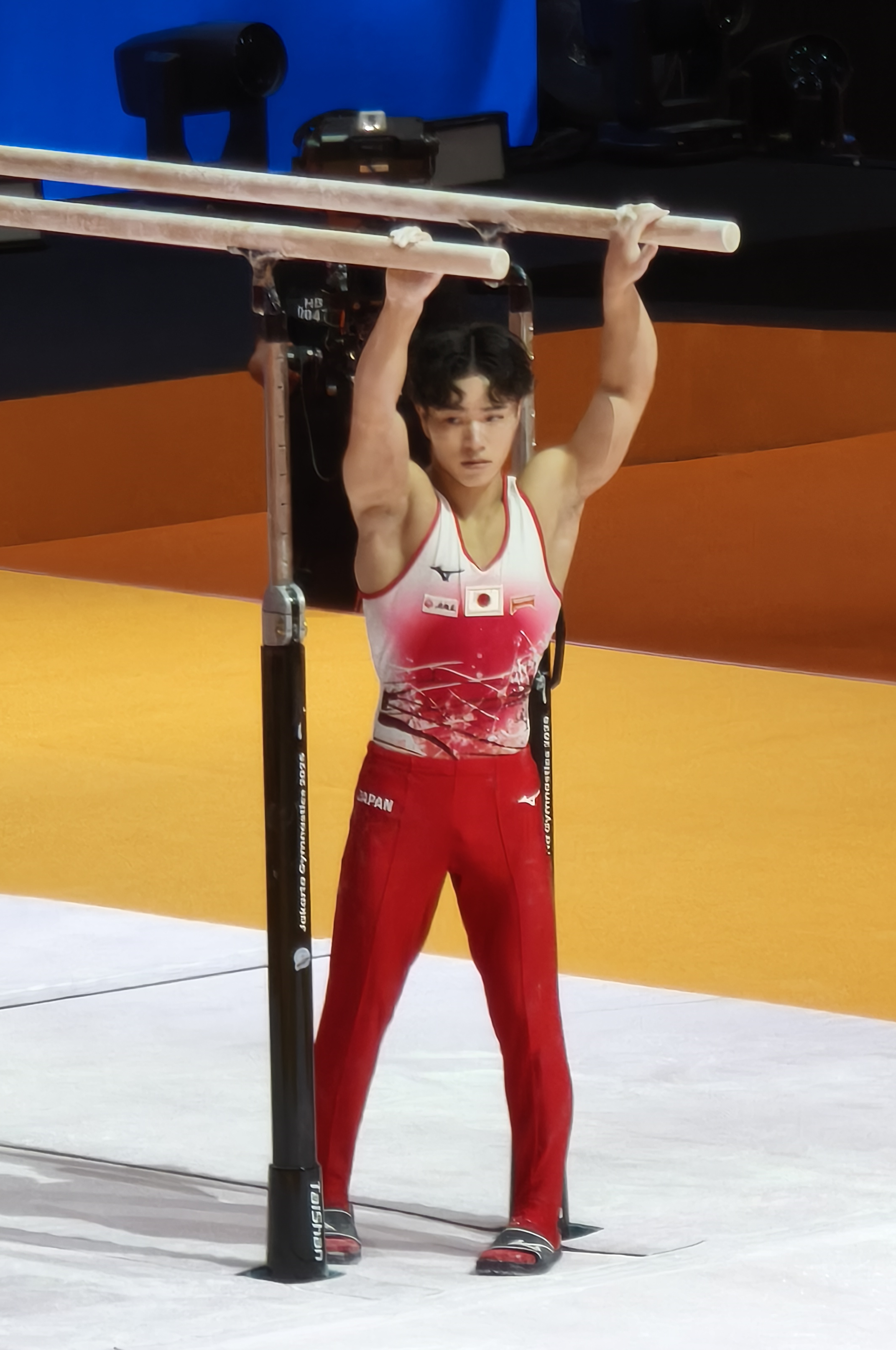
Oka at the 2025 World Championships

Competitive history of Shinnosuke Oka at the junior level
| Year | Event | Team | AA | FX | PH | SR | VT | PB | HB |
2018
| 2018 | Junior Asian Championships | 2nd place, silver medalist(s) | 3rd place, bronze medalist(s) | 2nd place, silver medalist(s) | 5 | 3rd place, bronze medalist(s) | | 2nd place, silver medalist(s) | 1st place, gold medalist(s) |
2019
| 2019 | Junior World Championships | 1st place, gold medalist(s) | 1st place, gold medalist(s) | | 2nd place, silver medalist(s) | 5 | | 3rd place, bronze medalist(s) | |
| 2019 | All-Japan Junior Championships | | 8 | | | | | | |
| 2020 | All-Japan Championships | | 44 | | | | | | |

Competitive history of Shinnosuke Oka at the senior level
| Year | Event | Team | AA | FX | PH | SR | VT | PB | HB |
|---|---|---|---|---|---|---|---|---|---|
| 2021 | All-Japan Championships | | 60 | | | | | | |
| 2023 | All-Japan Championships | | 10 | | | | | | |
| 2023 | NHK Trophy | | 11 | | | | | | |
| 2023 | All-Japan Event Championships | | | 3rd place, bronze medalist(s) | | | | 6 | |
| 2023 | Asian Championships | 2nd place, silver medalist(s) | 1st place, gold medalist(s) | 6 | 5 | 6 | | 2nd place, silver medalist(s) | 2nd place, silver medalist(s) |
| 2024 | All-Japan Championships | | 2nd place, silver medalist(s) | | | | | | |
| 2024 | NHK Trophy | | 1st place, gold medalist(s) | | | | | | |
| 2024 | Olympic Games | 1st place, gold medalist(s) | 1st place, gold medalist(s) | | | | | 3rd place, bronze medalist(s) | 1st place, gold medalist(s) |
| 2025 | All-Japan Championships | | 2nd place, silver medalist(s) | | | | | | |
| 2025 | NKH Trophy | | 1st place, gold medalist(s) | | | | | | |
| 2025 | Asian Championships | 1st place, gold medalist(s) | 1st place, gold medalist(s) | 7 | 6 | 4 | | 1st place, gold medalist(s) | |
| 2025 | World University Games | 1st place, gold medalist(s) | | 2nd place, silver medalist(s) | | | | 2nd place, silver medalist(s) | 6 |
| 2025 | World Championships | —N/a | 5 | | | | | 7 | |
| 2026 | Antalya World Cup | | | | | 4 | | 1st place, gold medalist(s) | |
| 2026 | NHK Trophy | | 1st place, gold medalist(s) | | | | | | |
| 2026 | Asian Games | 2nd place, silver medalist(s) | 2nd place, silver medalist(s) | WD | | WD | | 2nd place, silver medalist(s) | 2nd place, silver medalist(s) |
| 2026 | World Championships | 1st place, gold medalist(s) | 8 | | | 4 | | 5 | 2nd place, silver medalist(s) |
