= Zou Jingyuan =

Chinese artistic gymnast

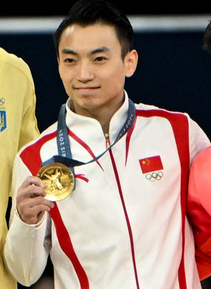
- Zou at the 2024 Olympic Games

Personal information
- Born: 3 January 1998 (age 28) Yibin, Sichuan, China
- Height: 1.58 m (5 ft 2 in)

Gymnastics career
- Discipline: Men's artistic gymnastics
- Country represented: China
- Club: Sichuan Province
- Head coaches: Wang Hongwei; Teng Haibin
- Eponymous skills: Zou (rings): From inverted cross lower slowly to inverted hang and felge backward slowly to V cross (2 seconds); Zou 2 (rings): From inverted cross lower slowly to inverted hang and felge backward slowly to support scale (2 seconds)
Medal record
Representing China
Men's artistic gymnastics
Event	1st	2nd	3rd
Olympic Games	2	2	1
World Championships	7	2	1
Asian Games	5	1	0
Asian Championships	3	1	0
World University Games	2	1	0
Total	19	7	2
Olympic Games
Gold medal – first place	2020 Tokyo	Parallel Bars
Gold medal – first place	2024 Paris	Parallel Bars
Silver medal – second place	2024 Paris	Team
Silver medal – second place	2024 Paris	Rings
Bronze medal – third place	2020 Tokyo	Team
World Championships
Gold medal – first place	2017 Montreal	Parallel Bars
Gold medal – first place	2018 Doha	Team
Gold medal – first place	2018 Doha	Parallel Bars
Gold medal – first place	2022 Liverpool	Team
Gold medal – first place	2022 Liverpool	Parallel Bars
Gold medal – first place	2025 Jakarta	Parallel Bars
Gold medal – first place	2026 Rotterdam	Parallel Bars
Silver medal – second place	2019 Stuttgart	Team
Silver medal – second place	2022 Liverpool	Rings
Bronze medal – third place	2026 Rotterdam	Team
Asian Games
Gold medal – first place	2018 Jakarta	Team
Gold medal – first place	2018 Jakarta	Parallel Bars
Gold medal – first place	2022 Hangzhou	Team
Gold medal – first place	2022 Hangzhou	Parallel Bars
Gold medal – first place	2026 Aichi-Nagoya	Team
Gold medal – first place	2026 Aichi-Nagoya	Parallel Bars
Silver medal – second place	2018 Jakarta	Pommel Horse
Bronze medal – third place	2026 Aichi-Nagoya	Rings
Asian Championships
Gold medal – first place	2017 Bangkok	Team
Gold medal – first place	2017 Bangkok	Rings
Gold medal – first place	2017 Bangkok	Parallel Bars
Silver medal – second place	2017 Bangkok	Pommel Horse
World University Games
Gold medal – first place	2021 Chengdu	Team
Gold medal – first place	2021 Chengdu	Parallel Bars
Silver medal – second place	2021 Chengdu	Rings

Zou Jingyuan (Chinese: 邹敬园; pinyin: Zōu Jìngyuán, born 3 January 1998) is a Chinese artistic gymnast who specializes in parallel bars and rings. He is a two-time Olympic champion on parallel bars, winning gold at the 2020 and 2024 Summer Olympics. He is a five-time world champion on parallel bars, winning in 2017, 2018, 2022, 2025, and 2026. He was a member of the Chinese team that won silver at the 2024 Paris Olympics, bronze at the 2020 Tokyo Olympics, gold at the 2018 and 2022 World Championships, and bronze at the 2019 and 2026 World Championships. He was the silver medalist on rings at the 2024 Olympics and the 2022 World Championships. Zou is widely considered the best parallel bars competitor in the world.

== Early life and education ==
Zou was born on 3 January 1998 in Yibin, Sichuan, China. He started gymnastics at the age of three when he was scouted by a coach because of his good physical condition.

The General Administration of Sport of China named Zou an Elite Athlete of National Class in 2016. Zou studied physical education at Chengdu Sport University.

== Gymnastics career ==
=== 2017–2021 ===
Zou competed at the 2017 Asian Championships in Bangkok, Thailand, where he helped China win team gold. Individually, he won gold on parallel bars and rings, as well as silver on pommel horse. Later that year, Zou competed at the 2017 World Championships in Montreal, Canada, where he won gold on parallel bars, earning his first World title.

At the 2018 Asian Games, Zou helped China win team gold. Individually, he placed first on parallel bars and second on pommel horse. At the 2018 World Championships he helped China win team gold ahead of Russia and defended his title on the parallel bars.

In 2019, Zou competed at the World Championships in Stuttgart, Germany, where he helped China win team silver. He failed to qualify for the parallel bars event final after an error in qualifying and was therefore unable to defend his title. He did qualify to the pommel horse final where he ultimately finished fourth.

Zou was named to the team to compete at the 2020 Olympic Games in Tokyo alongside including Sun Wei, Xiao Ruoteng, and Lin Chaopan. During the team final they won bronze with a combined score of 262.397, 0.606 points behind the winning Russian Olympic Committee team. Zou won Olympic gold on parallel bars with a score of 16.233, the highest score and widest margin of victory (0.533) posted by any gymnast in any event at the Tokyo Olympics.

=== 2022–2024 ===
Zou competed at the 2022 World Championships in Liverpool. During the qualification round, he successfully competed a new skill on rings. During the team final, he helped China win gold. During event finals he won silver on rings behind Adem Asil and gold on parallel bars. His score in the parallel bars final of 16.166 was the highest score posted by a gymnast at the competition.

In the summer of 2023, Zou competed at the postponed 2021 World University Games where he helped China win team gold. Individually, he won gold on parallel bars, silver on rings, and placed fourth on pommel horse. In the fall, the Chinese-hosted postponed 2022 Asian Games were scheduled to take place around the same time as the 2023 World Championships. Due to this, the Chinese Gymnastics Federation opted to send their best athletes to the Asian Games; as a result, Zou was unable to defend his World title. At the Asian Games, Zou helped China win team gold, and individually he won gold on parallel bars.

Zou was selected to represent China at the 2024 Summer Olympics alongside Liu Yang, Su Weide, Xiao Ruoteng, and Zhang Boheng. During the qualification round China qualified to the team final in first, 2.434 points ahead of their rivals Japan; as a result they were expected to win the gold medal. During the team final, China went into the final rotation with a 3.267 point lead; however, after Zou's teammate Su fell twice, Japan was able to capitalize on the mistakes, leaving China with the silver medal. During the individual event finals Zou won silver on rings behind compatriot Liu and successfully defended his Olympic title on the parallel bars.

=== 2025–present ===
Zou competed at the 2025 World Championships where he won his fourth World title on the parallel bars.

At the 2026 Asian Games, Zou helped China win gold as a team. Individually he won bronze on rings and gold on parallel bars. At the 2026 World Championships, Zou helped China win bronze as a team. Individually he won his fifth World title on the parallel bars with a score of 15.733, the highest single score of the entire competition on any apparatus. He also earned the highest execution score of the competition, a 9.633, with the judge from Brazil giving his routine a perfect 10.

== Competitive history ==
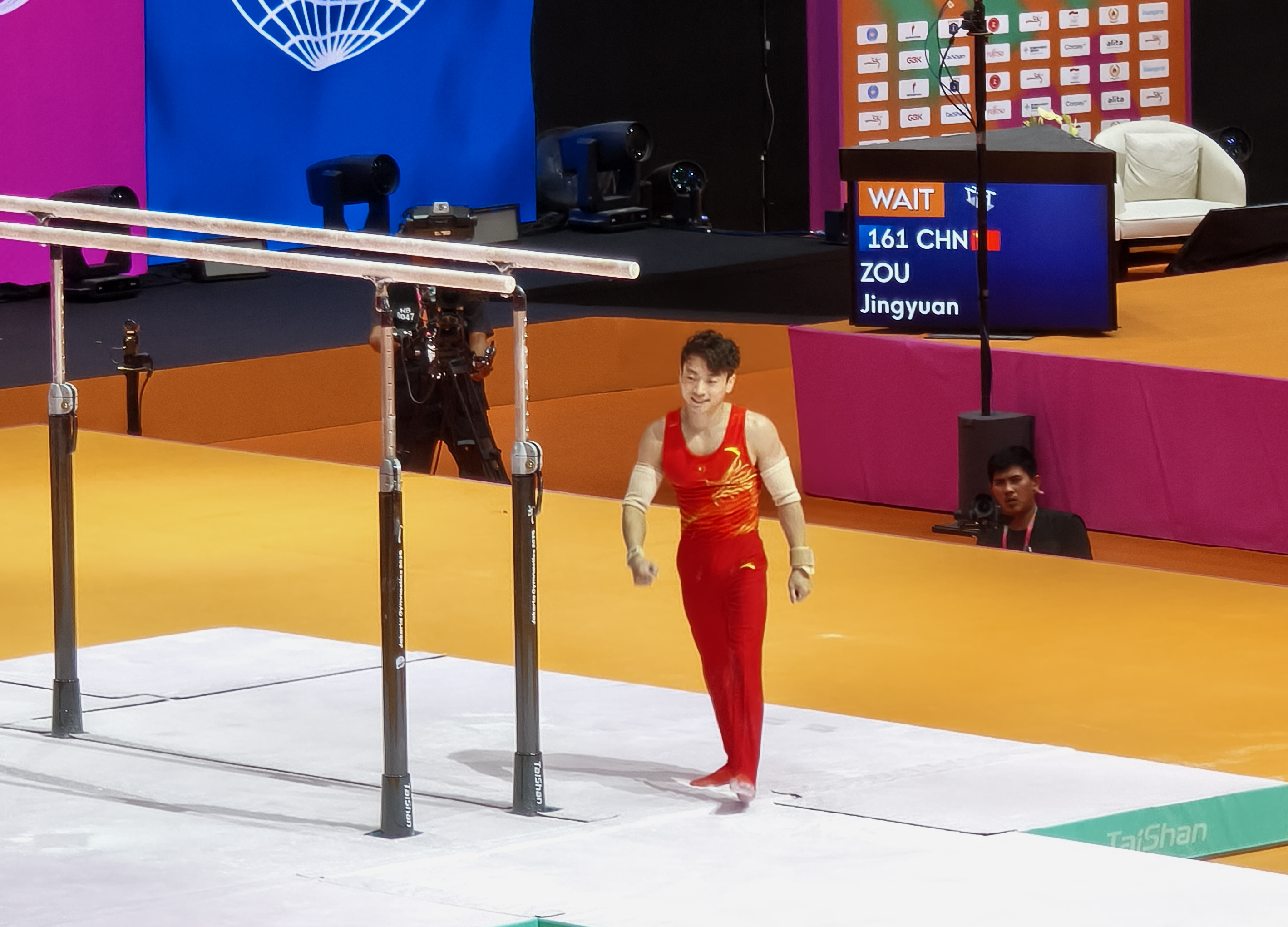
Zou at the 2025 World Championships

Competitive history of Zou Jingyuan
Year	Event	Team	AA	FX	PH	SR	VT	PB	HB
2014	Pacific Rim Championships	4				2nd place, silver medalist(s)		3rd place, bronze medalist(s)	
2016	Pacific Rim Championships	2nd place, silver medalist(s)			5				
2016	Chinese Championships				2nd place, silver medalist(s)				
2017	Melbourne World Cup				2nd place, silver medalist(s)	1st place, gold medalist(s)		1st place, gold medalist(s)	
2017	Doha World Cup				7	3rd place, bronze medalist(s)		1st place, gold medalist(s)	
2017	Asian Championships	1st place, gold medalist(s)			2nd place, silver medalist(s)	1st place, gold medalist(s)		1st place, gold medalist(s)	
2017	World Championships	—N/a						1st place, gold medalist(s)	
2018	Doha World Cup				1st place, gold medalist(s)	3rd place, bronze medalist(s)		1st place, gold medalist(s)	
2018	Chinese Championships	11						1st place, gold medalist(s)	
2018	Asian Games	1st place, gold medalist(s)			2nd place, silver medalist(s)			1st place, gold medalist(s)	
2018	World Championships	1st place, gold medalist(s)						1st place, gold medalist(s)	
2019	Doha World Cup				7			1st place, gold medalist(s)	
2019	Chinese Championships	1st place, gold medalist(s)			6			1st place, gold medalist(s)	
2019	Zhaoqing World Challenge Cup				1st place, gold medalist(s)			1st place, gold medalist(s)	
2019	World Championships	2nd place, silver medalist(s)			4				
2020	Chinese Championships				1st place, gold medalist(s)			2nd place, silver medalist(s)	
2021	Chinese Championships	8	5					1st place, gold medalist(s)	
2021	Olympic Trials				1st place, gold medalist(s)	3rd place, bronze medalist(s)		1st place, gold medalist(s)	
2021	Olympic Games	3rd place, bronze medalist(s)						1st place, gold medalist(s)	
2021	Chinese National Games	9			3rd place, bronze medalist(s)	6		1st place, gold medalist(s)	
2022	Chinese Championships					2nd place, silver medalist(s)			
2022	World Championships	1st place, gold medalist(s)				2nd place, silver medalist(s)		1st place, gold medalist(s)	
2023	Chinese Championships	5			4			1st place, gold medalist(s)	
2023	World University Games	1st place, gold medalist(s)			6	2nd place, silver medalist(s)		1st place, gold medalist(s)	
2023	Asian Games	1st place, gold medalist(s)				6		1st place, gold medalist(s)	
2024	Baku World Cup					2nd place, silver medalist(s)		2nd place, silver medalist(s)	
2024	Chinese Championships	6			1st place, gold medalist(s)	2nd place, silver medalist(s)		1st place, gold medalist(s)	
2024	Olympic Games	2nd place, silver medalist(s)				2nd place, silver medalist(s)		1st place, gold medalist(s)	
2025	Chinese Championships	8						1st place, gold medalist(s)	
2025	World Championships							1st place, gold medalist(s)	
2026
2026	Asian Games	1st place, gold medalist(s)				3rd place, bronze medalist(s)		1st place, gold medalist(s)	
2026	World Championships	3rd place, bronze medalist(s)						1st place, gold medalist(s)	
