= Volleyball at the Summer World University Games =

- Events: 2 (men: 1; women: 1)

Games
- 1959; 1960; 1961; 1962; 1963; 1964; 1965; 1966; 1967; 1968; 1970; 1970; 1973; 1972; 1975; 1975; 1977; 1978; 1979; 1981; 1983; 1985; 1987; 1989; 1991; 1993; 1995; 1997; 1999; 2001; 2003; 2005; 2007; 2009; 2011; 2013; 2015; 2017; 2019; 2021; 2025

Volleyball tournaments have been staged at the Universiade since 1959. The men's tournament was introduced in 1959, while the women's tournament was introduced in 1961. The sport was not included in 1975 and 1989.

== Summary (1959-2025) ==
Games	Year	Teams (M+W)	Ref
1	1959	12+0	
2	1961	8+6	
3	1963	8+3	
4	1965	16+9	
5	1967	7+3	
6	1970	21+13	
7	1973	23+15	
8			
9	1977	23+19	
10	1979	23+12	
11	1981	28+15	
12	1983	23+12	
13	1985	18+10	
14	1987	25+19	
15			
16	1991	19+16	
17	1993	18+15	
18	1995	28+14	
19	1997	16+15	
20	1999	24+16	
21	2001	27+15	
22	2003	23+19	
23	2005	23+21	
24	2007	23+16	
25	2009	23+16	
26	2011	21+15	
27	2013	21+15	
28	2015	21+15	
29	2017	22+16	
30	2019	16+16	
31	2021	16+12	
32	2025	15+16	

=== Men's tournament ===
Year	Host	Gold medal game			Bronze medal game
Year	Host	Gold medalist	Score	Silver medalist	Bronze medalist	Score	Fourth place
1959; Details	(Italy); Turin	Czechoslovakia	Round Robin	Romania	Poland	Round Robin	Bulgaria
1961; Details	(Bulgaria); Sofia	Romania	Round Robin	Bulgaria	Czechoslovakia	Round Robin	Poland
1963; Details	(Brazil); Porto Alegre	Soviet Union	Round Robin	Czechoslovakia	Brazil	Round Robin	Cuba
1965; Details	(Hungary); Budapest	Soviet Union	Round Robin	Hungary	Yugoslavia	Round Robin	Bulgaria
1967; Details	(Japan); Tokyo	Japan	Round Robin	South Korea	France	Round Robin	Philippines
1970; Details	(Italy); Turin	Italy	Round Robin	Soviet Union	South Korea	Round Robin	Japan
1973; Details	(Soviet Union); Moscow	Soviet Union	Round Robin	Cuba	South Korea	Round Robin	Poland
1977; Details	(Bulgaria); Sofia	Bulgaria	3-1	Czechoslovakia	South Korea	3-2	Soviet Union
1979; Details	Mexico City	South Korea	Round Robin	Cuba	Japan	Round Robin	Italy
1981; Details	(Romania); Bucharest	Romania	Round Robin	Cuba	Japan	Round Robin	South Korea
1983; Details	(Canada); Edmonton	Cuba	3-1	Canada	Italy		South Korea
1985; Details	(Japan); Kobe	Japan	3-2	Soviet Union	Italy	3-0	South Korea
1987; Details	(Socialist Federal Republic of Yugoslavia); Zagreb	Yugoslavia	3-0	China	Italy	3-0	Soviet Union
1991; Details	(United Kingdom); Sheffield	Poland	3-0	United States	Soviet Union	3-0	Algeria
1993; Details	(United States); Buffalo	Japan	3-1	Poland	South Korea	3-2	Belgium
1995; Details	(Japan); Fukuoka	South Korea	3-2	Spain	Italy	3-0	Israel
1997; Details	(Italy); Sicilly	South Korea	3-0	Italy	Russia	3-0	Japan
1999; Details	(Spain); Palma de Mallorca	Germany	3-1	Japan	Spain	3-2	South Korea
2001; Details	(China); Beijing	United States	3-1	France	Russia	3-1	Denmark
2003; Details	(South Korea); Daegu	South Korea	3-0	Japan	United States	3-1	France
2005; Details	(Turkey); İzmir	Turkey	3–2	Japan	Italy	3–1	Brazil
2007; Details	(Thailand); Bangkok	Turkey	3–1	Canada	United States	3–0	Italy
2009; Details	(Serbia); Belgrade	Russia	3–0	Brazil	Egypt	3–0	Czech Republic
2011; Details	(China); Shenzhen	Russia	3–1	Ukraine	Brazil	3–1	Canada
2013; Details	(Russia); Kazan	Russia	3–0	Poland	Japan	3–0	Ukraine
2015; Details	(South Korea); Gwangju	Russia	3–1	Ukraine	Argentina	3–1	Chinese Taipei
2017; Details	(Taiwan); Taipei	Iran	3–2	Russia	Japan	3–1	Ukraine
2019; Details	(Italy); Naples	Italy	3–2	Poland	Russia	3–0	France
2021; Details	(China); Chengdu	Italy	3–0	Poland	China	3–0	Iran
2025; Details	(Germany); Berlin	Poland	3–0	Brazil	Italy	3–1	Japan

=== Women's tournament ===
Year	Host	Gold medal game			Bronze medal game
Year	Host	Gold medalist	Score	Silver medalist	Bronze medalist	Score	Fourth place
1961; Details	(Bulgaria); Sofia	Soviet Union	Round Robin	Bulgaria	Romania	Round Robin	Poland
1963; Details	(Brazil); Porto Alegre	Brazil	Round Robin	Peru	Chile	Only three teams entered
1965; Details	(Hungary); Budapest	Soviet Union	3-0	Bulgaria	Romania	3-0	Czechoslovakia
1967; Details	(Japan); Tokyo	Japan	Round Robin	Philippines	Hong Kong	Only three teams entered
1970; Details	(Italy); Turin	Soviet Union	Round Robin	Japan	Bulgaria	Round Robin	Brazil
1973; Details	(Soviet Union); Moscow	Soviet Union	Round Robin	Bulgaria	Brazil	Round Robin	Romania
1977; Details	(Bulgaria); Sofia	Soviet Union	3-2	Cuba	Bulgaria	3-2	Czechoslovakia
1979; Details	Mexico City	Soviet Union	3-0	Japan	Cuba	3-0	Brazil
1981; Details	(Romania); Bucharest	China	3-0	Cuba	Brazil	3-1	Romania
1983; Details	(Canada); Edmonton	Brazil	3-1	China	Japan	3-0	Canada
1985; Details	(Japan); Kobe	Japan	3-1	North Korea	West Germany	3-1	United States
1987; Details	(Socialist Federal Republic of Yugoslavia); Zagreb	China	3-1	Soviet Union	East Germany	3-1	Bulgaria
1991; Details	(United Kingdom); Sheffield	Italy	3-1	Romania	United States	3-1	Japan
1993; Details	(United States); Buffalo	Romania	3-1	United States	Switzerland	3-2	Japan
1995; Details	(Japan); Fukuoka	China	3-1	Japan	Russia	3-1	United States
1997; Details	(Italy); Catania	Russia	3-0	United States	Japan	3-0	Canada
1999; Details	(Spain); Majorca	China	3-2	Russia	France	3-2	Japan
2001; Details	(China); Beijing	China	3-1	Russia	Thailand	3-1	Brazil
2003; Details	(South Korea); Daegu	China	3-0	Chinese Taipei	Russia	3-0	France
2005; Details	(Turkey); İzmir	Chinese Taipei	3–0	Poland	China	3–0	Italy
2007; Details	(Thailand); Bangkok	Poland	3–0	Serbia	China	3–0	Thailand
2009; Details	(Serbia); Belgrade	Italy	3–2	Serbia	Poland	3–1	Russia
2011; Details	(China); Shenzhen	Brazil	3–0	China	Russia	3–1	Japan
2013; Details	(Russia); Kazan	Russia	3–2	Brazil	Thailand	3–1	Poland
2015; Details	(South Korea); Gwangju	Russia	3–0	Ukraine	Japan	3–1	Brazil
2017; Details	(Taiwan); Taipei	Russia	3–1	Japan	Ukraine	3–1	Chinese Taipei
2019; Details	(Italy); Naples	Russia	3–1	Italy	Japan	3–2	Hungary
2021; Details	(China); Chengdu	China	3–0	Japan	Poland	3–1	Brazil
2025; Details	(Germany); Berlin	Italy	3–1	Japan	Brazil	3–1	Germany

== Medal table ==
Last updated during the 2025 Summer Universiade

Rank	Nation	Gold	Silver	Bronze	Total
1	Russia (RUS)	9	3	6	18
2	Soviet Union (URS)	9	3	1	13
3	China (CHN)	7	3	3	13
4	Italy (ITA)	6	2	6	14
5	Japan (JPN)	5	9	8	22
6	South Korea (KOR)	4	1	4	9
7	Poland (POL)	3	5	3	11
8	Brazil (BRA)	3	3	5	11
9	Romania (ROM)	3	3	0	6
10	Turkey (TUR)	2	0	0	2
11	Cuba (CUB)	1	5	1	7
12	Bulgaria (BUL)	1	4	2	7
13	United States (USA)	1	3	3	7
14	Czechoslovakia (TCH)	1	1	3	5
15	Chinese Taipei (TPE)	1	1	0	2
16	Germany (GER)	1	0	1	2
16	Yugoslavia (YUG)	1	0	1	2
18	Iran (IRI)	1	0	0	1
19	Ukraine (UKR)	0	3	1	4
20	Canada (CAN)	0	2	0	2
20	Serbia (SRB)	0	2	0	2
22	France (FRA)	0	1	2	3
23	Spain (ESP)	0	1	1	2
24	Hungary (HUN)	0	1	0	1
24	North Korea (PRK)	0	1	0	1
24	Peru (PER)	0	1	0	1
24	Philippines (PHI)	0	1	0	1
28	Thailand (THA)	0	0	2	2
29	Argentina (ARG)	0	0	1	1
29	Chile (CHI)	0	0	1	1
29	East Germany (GDR)	0	0	1	1
29	Egypt (EGY)	0	0	1	1
29	Hong Kong (HKG)	0	0	1	1
29	Switzerland (SUI)	0	0	1	1
Totals (34 entries)		59	59	59	177

== See also ==
- Volleyball at the Summer Olympics
- Volleyball at the Mediterranean Games
