= Japan at the 1961 Summer Universiade =

- IOC code: JPN
- NOC: Japanese Olympic Committee
- Website: www.joc.or.jp/english/ (in English)

in Sofia, Bulgaria 25 August – 3 September 1961
- Medals Ranked 2nd: Gold 9 Silver 5 Bronze 4 Total 18

Summer Universiade appearances (overview)
- 1959; 1961; 1963; 1965; 1967; 1970; 1973; 1975; 1977; 1979; 1981; 1983; 1985; 1987; 1989; 1991; 1993; 1995; 1997; 1999; 2001; 2003; 2005; 2007; 2009; 2011; 2013; 2015; 2017; 2019; 2021; 2025; 2027

Japan participated at the 1961 Summer Universiade, in Sofia, Bulgaria. Japan finished second in the medal table with 9 gold medals, 5 silver medals, and 4 bronze medals.

== Medal summary ==
=== Medalists ===
Medal	Name	Sport	Event	Date
Gold	Shunsuke Kaneto	Diving	Men's springboard	unknown
Gold	Tadao Tosa	Diving	Men's platform	unknown
Gold	Takashi Mitsukuri	Gymnastics	Men's individual all-around	unknown
Gold	Keigo Shimizu	Swimming	Men's 100 m freestyle	unknown
Gold	Tatsuo Fujimoto	Swimming	Men's 400 m freestyle	unknown
Gold	Shigeo Fukushima	Swimming	Men's 100 m backstroke	unknown
Gold	Haruo Yoshimuta	Swimming	Men's 200 m butterfly	unknown
Gold	Keigo Shimizu; Kiyoshi Fukui; Haruo Yoshimuta; Tatsuo Fujimoto	Swimming	Men's 4x100 m freestyle relay	unknown
Gold	Shigeo Fukushima; Yoshiaki Shikiishi; Haruo Yoshimuta; Tatsuo Fujimoto	Swimming	Men's 4x100 m medley relay	unknown
Silver	Takayuki Okazaki	Athletics	Men's long jump	September 1
Silver	Kiyoshi Asai; Yojiro Muro; Takayuki Okazaki; Hirotada Hayase	Athletics	Men's 4x100 m relay	September 1
Silver	Fumio Akutagawa; Mitsuru Motoi	Tennis	Men's doubles	unknown
Silver	Tomashiro Matsuki	Swimming	Men's 1500 m freestyle	unknown
Silver	Yoshiaki Shikiishi	Swimming	Men's 200 m breaststroke	unknown
Bronze	Tomio Ota	Athletics	Men's triple jump	September 3
Bronze	Kiyoshi Fukui	Swimming	Men's 100 m freestyle	unknown
Bronze	Tomashiro Matsuki	Swimming	Men's 400 m freestyle	unknown
Bronze	Tatsuo Fujimoto	Swimming	Men's 1500 m freestyle	unknown

=== Medals by sport ===
Medals by sport
Sport	1st place, gold medalist(s)	2nd place, silver medalist(s)	3rd place, bronze medalist(s)	Total
Swimming	6	2	3	11
Diving	2	0	0	2
Gymnastics	1	0	0	1
Athletics	0	2	1	3
Tennis	0	1	0	1
Total	9	5	4	18
