= Gymnastics at the Summer World University Games =

- Events: 22 (men: 8; women: 14)

Games
- 1959; 1960; 1961; 1962; 1963; 1964; 1965; 1966; 1967; 1968; 1970; 1970; 1973; 1972; 1975; 1975; 1977; 1978; 1979; 1981; 1983; 1985; 1987; 1989; 1991; 1993; 1995; 1997; 1999; 2001; 2003; 2005; 2007; 2009; 2011; 2013; 2015; 2017; 2019; 2021; 2025

Gymnastics is a sport at the World University Games (formerly branded as the Universiade, before 2020). It was first contested in 1961 as an optional sport, and turned compulsory in 1963. Since then, it has been out of the program twice, in 1975 and 1989. In 1973, for the first time, a competition in apparatus was added to the program; it would become mandatory in 1979. In 1991, rhythmic gymnastics was one of the two optional sports chosen by the organizers. It was present with the same status in 1995 and 1997, becoming a compulsory sport in 2001. At the 2011 edition, aerobic gymnastics was also part of the program.

== Overall ==
Games	Year	Host city	Host country	Winner	Second	Third
II	1961	Sofia	Bulgaria	Soviet Union	Japan	Bulgaria
III	1963	Porto Alegre	Brazil	Japan	Hungary	Soviet Union
IV	1965	Budapest	Hungary	Hungary	Japan	Soviet Union
V	1967	Tokyo	Japan	Japan	United States	South Korea
VI	1970	Turin	Italy	Soviet Union	Japan	United States
VII	1973	Moscow	Soviet Union	Soviet Union	Romania	Cuba
IX	1977	Sofia	Bulgaria	Soviet Union	Romania	Japan
X	1979	Mexico City	Mexico	Soviet Union	Romania	Japan
XI	1981	Bucharest	Romania	Romania	China	Soviet Union
XII	1983	Edmonton	Canada	Soviet Union	Romania	China
XIII	1985	Kobe	Japan	Soviet Union	Romania	China
XIV	1987	Zagreb	Yugoslavia	Soviet Union	China	Romania
XVI	1991	Sheffield	Great Britain	North Korea	Soviet Union	China
XVII	1993	Buffalo	United States	Ukraine	China	Belarus
XVIII	1995	Fukuoka	Japan	Bulgaria	Russia	China
XVIX	1997	Catania	Italy	China	Japan	Ukraine
XX	1999	Palma de Mallorca	Spain	Russia	Belarus	Ukraine
XXI	2001	Beijing	China	China	Russia	Ukraine
XXII	2003	Daegu	South Korea	Russia	Ukraine	South Korea
XXIII	2005	İzmir	Turkey	Ukraine	China	Japan
XXIV	2007	Bangkok	Thailand	Ukraine	Japan	Ukraine
XXV	2009	Belgrade	Serbia	Russia	China	Japan
XXVI	2011	Shenzhen	China	China	Russia	Japan
XXVII	2013	Kazan	Russia	Russia	Japan	South Korea
XXVIII	2015	Gwangju	South Korea	Russia	Ukraine	Japan
XXVIX	2017	Taipei	Taiwan	Russia	Japan	Ukraine
XXX	2019	Naples	Italy	Russia	Japan	Chinese Taipei
XXXI	2021	Chengdu	China	China	Japan	Ukraine
XXXII	2025	Essen	Germany	Japan	China	Individual Neutral Athletes

=== All-time medal table ===
Note
Last updated after the 2025 Summer World University Games

Rank	Nation	Gold	Silver	Bronze	Total
1	Russia (RUS)	86	63	58	207
2	China (CHN)	70	54	46	170
3	Soviet Union (URS)	67	45	35	147
4	Japan (JPN)	62	78	78	218
5	Ukraine (UKR)	41	51	48	140
6	Romania (ROU)	30	21	25	76
7	South Korea (KOR)	15	15	25	55
8	North Korea (PRK)	14	10	11	35
9	Belarus (BLR)	9	16	15	40
10	Hungary (HUN)	9	10	11	30
11	Bulgaria (BUL)	6	4	6	16
12	Canada (CAN)	5	5	9	19
12	Chinese Taipei (TPE)	5	5	9	19
14	France (FRA)	5	2	2	9
15	Great Britain (GBR)	5	1	3	9
16	Italy (ITA)	4	4	6	14
17	Armenia (ARM)	4	0	0	4
18	United States (USA)	3	13	20	36
19	Kazakhstan (KAZ)	3	9	9	21
20	Azerbaijan (AZE)	3	6	1	10
21	Cuba (CUB)	3	3	3	9
22	Brazil (BRA)	3	3	1	7
23	Germany (GER)	2	5	5	12
24	Individual Neutral Athletes (AIN)	2	2	1	5
25	Uzbekistan (UZB)	2	2	0	4
26	Croatia (CRO)	2	0	2	4
27	Australia (AUS)	2	0	0	2
28	Belgium (BEL)	1	2	2	5
29	Mexico (MEX)	1	2	0	3
30	Latvia (LAT)	1	1	0	2
30	Netherlands (NED)	1	1	0	2
32	Slovenia (SLO)	1	0	2	3
33	West Germany (FRG)	1	0	1	2
34	Dominican Republic (DOM)	1	0	0	1
35	Turkey (TUR)	0	2	2	4
36	Poland (POL)	0	2	1	3
37	Spain (ESP)	0	1	3	4
38	Finland (FIN)	0	1	2	3
38	Switzerland (SUI)	0	1	2	3
40	Austria (AUT)	0	1	1	2
40	Portugal (POR)	0	1	1	2
40	Yugoslavia (YUG)	0	1	1	2
43	Czechoslovakia (TCH)	0	1	0	1
43	Israel (ISR)	0	1	0	1
45	Cyprus (CYP)	0	0	1	1
45	Czech Republic (CZE)	0	0	1	1
45	Estonia (EST)	0	0	1	1
45	Hong Kong (HKG)	0	0	1	1
Totals (48 entries)		469	445	451	1,365

=== References ===
- Sports123 (1961-2009)
- 2011 Summer Universiade – Artistic gymnastics
- 2011 Summer Universiade – Rhythmic gymnastics
- 2011 Summer Universiade – Aerobic gymnastics
- 2013 Summer Universiade – Artistic gymnastics
- 2013 Summer Universiade – Rhythmic gymnastics
- 2015 Summer Universiade – Artistic gymnastics
- 2015 Summer Universiade – Rhythmic gymnastics
