= Japan at the 1963 Summer Universiade =

- IOC code: JPN
- NOC: Japanese Olympic Committee
- Website: www.joc.or.jp/english/ (in English)

in Porto Alegre, Brazil 31 August – 8 September 1961
- Medals Ranked 4th: Gold 9 Silver 4 Bronze 6 Total 19

Summer Universiade appearances (overview)
- 1959; 1961; 1963; 1965; 1967; 1970; 1973; 1975; 1977; 1979; 1981; 1983; 1985; 1987; 1989; 1991; 1993; 1995; 1997; 1999; 2001; 2003; 2005; 2007; 2009; 2011; 2013; 2015; 2017; 2019; 2021; 2025; 2027

Japan participated at the 1963 Summer Universiade, in Porto Alegre, Brazil. Japan finished fourth in the medal table with 9 gold medals, 4 silver medals, and 6 bronze medals.

== Medal summary ==
=== Medalists ===
Medal	Name	Sport	Event
Gold	Shunsuke Kaneto	Diving	Men's platform
Gold	Shunsuke Kaneto	Diving	Men's springboard
Gold	Haruo Yoshimuta	Swimming	Men's 400 m freestyle
Gold	Haruo Yoshimuta	Swimming	Men's 1500 m freestyle
Gold	Toshizo Umemoto; Haruo Yoshimuta; Kiyoshi Fukui; Tatsuo Fujimoto	Swimming	Men's 4 × 100 m freestyle relay
Gold	Mamoru Morimoto	Athletics	Men's 800 m
Gold	Satoshi Shimo	Athletics	Men's triple jump
Gold	Masatake Matsumoto; Shuji Tsurumi; Takeshi Kato; Takashi Mitsukuri; Takuji Hayata; Yukio Endo	Gymnastics	Men's team all-around
Gold	Masatake Matsumoto	Gymnastics	Men's individual all-around
Silver	Makoto Fukui	Swimming	Men's 100 m freestyle
Silver	Mamoru Morimoto	Athletics	Men's 1500 m
Silver	Takeshi Kato	Gymnastics	Men's individual all-around
Silver	Takeshi Koura; Mitsuru Motoi	Tennis	Men's doubles
Bronze	Masaru Ito	Diving	Men's platform
Bronze	Masaru Ito	Diving	Men's springboard
Bronze	Isao Nakajima	Swimming	Men's 200 m butterfly
Bronze	Masatoshi Wakabayashi	Athletics	Men's hammer throw
Bronze	Takuji Hayata	Gymnastics	Men's individual all-around
Bronze	Mitsuru Motoi	Tennis	Men's singles

=== Medals by sport ===
Medals by sport
Sport	1st place, gold medalist(s)	2nd place, silver medalist(s)	3rd place, bronze medalist(s)	Total
Swimming	3	1	1	5
Athletics	2	1	1	4
Gymnastics	2	1	1	4
Diving	2	0	2	4
Tennis	0	1	1	2
Total	9	4	6	19
