= Murray McLachlan (swimmer) =

South African swimmer (born 1941)

Personal information
- Born: 19 January 1941 (age 85) Johannesburg, South Africa

Sport
- Sport: Swimming
Medal record
Men's swimming
Representing South Africa
British Empire and Commonwealth Games
Bronze medal – third place	1958 Cardiff	1650 y freestyle
Universiade
Gold medal – first place	1961 Sofia	1500 m freestyle
Silver medal – second place	1961 Sofia	400 m freestyle
Silver medal – second place	1963 Porto Alegre	400 m freestyle
Bronze medal – third place	1963 Porto Alegre	1500 m freestyle

Murray McLachlan (born 19 January 1941) is a South African former swimmer. He competed in two events at the 1960 Summer Olympics. At the 1958 British Empire and Commonwealth Games McLachlan competed in the 110 yards freestyle not progressing past the heats.
