= Tisha Abundo =

Filipina educator and athlete (1949–2023)

Philippine Sports Commissioner
- In office 1998–2001

Personal details
- Born: Teresita Patrick Dominguez; July 12, 1949
- Died: August 13, 2023 (aged 74)
- Volleyball career

Personal information
- Nickname: Tisha
- Nationality: Philippines
- Height: 5 ft 9 in (175 cm)
- Education: University of the East

National team
1966–1974	Philippines
1967	Philippines (Universiade)
Honours
Women's volleyball
Representing Philippines
Summer Universiade
Silver medal – second place	1967 Tokyo	Team

Teresita "Tisha" Dominguez Abundo (July 12, 1949 – August 13, 2023) was a Filipina educator and volleyball player who served as Philippine Sports Commissioner from 1998 to 2001.

== Early life and education ==
Teresita Dominguez "Tisha" Abundo was born to Antonio Dominguez and Leonor Patrick. Her father was a government employee at the Manila City Hall while her mother was a housewife. Abundo attended the University of the East on a varsity scholarship where she obtained her Bachelor of Science in Education, with a major in Physical Education and minor in English.

== Career ==
=== Volleyball ===
Abundo was the youngest Filipina to become a member of the national volleyball team when, at age 17, she wore the colors of the country in the 1966 Asian Games in Bangkok. Four years later, she represented the Philippines in the 1970 Asian Games, also in Bangkok. She played in the Summer Universiade in Tokyo in 1967 and the Asian Zonal Volleyball Championships in Manila in 1974. She won a Philippine Presidential Award in 1969 as the “Most Outstanding Female National Volleyball Player”.

=== Teaching ===
In 1972 Abundo began teaching at University of the East. In 1990, she was appointed Director of Physical Education at the Philippine School of Business Administration (PSBA).

=== Modeling career ===
Abundo was a member of Karilagan Arts International and was named their signature model in 1974. She modeled for fashion designers Ben Farrales and Pitoy Moreno. She was a member of the cultural and trade missions organized by the Department of Tourism that traveled to 11 states in the United States, Berlin, Melbourne, Guam, Hong Kong and Tokyo in the 1970s.

=== Sports administration ===
Abundo founded the National Capital Region Athletic Association (NCRAA), consisting of 19 educational institutions. She also served as the founding president of the first national athletic organization for Philippine tertiary level sports, the Federation of Higher Education Sports Association (FHESA).

She helped establish the Federation of School Sports Association of the Philippines in 2009.

==== Philippine Sports Commissioner ====
Abundo was appointed Philippine Sports Commissioner in 1998. In the position, she organized the Philippines' first Palarong Kababaihan (Women's Games) as part of the celebration of the International Day for Women in 2000. She laid down the foundation of the Philippine Sports Talent Identification Program (PSTIP), the Philippines' first attempt to include scientific parameters in the identification and selection of sports potentials. Abundo represented the country at the International Olympic Academy in Athens in 1999, where she delivered a paper on Women, Sports and Development: Towards Empowerment and Equity in the Philippines.

== Death ==
Teresita Abundo died on August 13, 2023, at the age of 74.
