= Nelli Abramova =

Soviet volleyball player (born 1940)

Personal information
- Full name: Nelli Mikhaylovna Abramova
- Nationality: Soviet Union; Russia
- Born: 18 August 1940 (age 86); Chelyabinsk, Russian SFSR, Soviet Union (now Russia)
- Height: 1.71 m (5 ft 7 in)
- Weight: 60 kg (132 lb)

Career
Years	Teams
1956–1962	Trud Chelyabinsk
1962–1966	Spartak Irkutsk
1966–1975	Burevestnik Odessa

National team
1964–1967	Soviet Union
Honours
Women's volleyball
Representing the Soviet Union
Olympic Games
Silver medal – second place	1964 Tokyo	Team competition
European Championship
Gold medal – first place	1967 Turkey	Team
Summer Universiade
Gold medal – first place	1965 Budapest	Team

Nelli Mikhaylovna Abramova (Russian: Не́лли Миха́йловна Абра́мова) (born 18 August 1940, in Chelyabinsk) is a Jewish former Soviet competitive volleyball player. She is an Olympic silver medallist (in 1964) and European champion (in 1967).

== Career ==
Abramova played from 1956 until 1975, for clubs in the Russian SFSR and the Ukrainian SSR, winning the USSR Cup in 1974. She played for the Soviet Union national team from 1964 to 1967 becoming an Olympic silver medallist (in 1964), Universiade champion (in 1965) and European champion (in 1967).

== Clubs ==
- (Russian Soviet Federative Socialist Republic) Trud Chelyabinsk (1956–1962)
- (Russian Soviet Federative Socialist Republic) Spartak Irkutsk (1962–1966)
- (Ukrainian Soviet Socialist Republic) Burevestnik Odessa / Medin Odessa (1966–1975)

== Honours and awards ==
- Merited Master of Sports of the USSR (1971)

National team

- 1964 Olympic Games – Silver medal
- 1965 Summer Universiade – Gold medal
- 1967 European Championship – Gold medal

Clubs

- 1974 USSR Cup (champion with Medin Odessa)

== See also ==
- List of select Jewish volleyball players
