= Kim Ho-chul =

South Korean volleyball player and coach

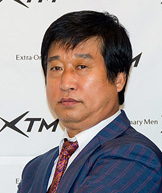
- Kim in 2011

Personal information
- Full name: Kim Ho-chul
- Nationality: South Korean
- Born: November 13, 1955 (age 70); Milyang, Gyeongsangnam-do
- Height: 1.75 m (5 ft 9 in)
- Weight: 68 kg (150 lb)
- Education: Hanyang University

Coaching information
Previous teams coached
Years	Teams
1995–1996; 1996–1998; 1998–2000; 2000–2003; 2003–2011; 2012–2013; 2013–2015; 2017-2019; 2021-2025	Maxicono Parma; Sisley Treviso; Porto Ravenna; Adria Trieste; Cheonan Hyundai Capital; Seoul Rush & Cash; Cheonan Hyundai Capital; South Korea men Hwaseong IBK Altos

Volleyball information
- Position: Setter

Career
Years	Teams
1978–1981; 1981–1983; 1983–1987; 1987–1990; 1990–1995	(South Korea) GS (Italy) Maxicono Parma (South Korea) Hyundai (Italy) Sisley Treviso (Italy) Schio Sport

National team
1975–1988	South Korea
Honours
Representing South Korea
Men's volleyball
Asian Games
Gold medal – first place	1978 Bangkok	Team
Silver medal – second place	1986 Seoul	Team
Universiade
Gold medal – first place	1979 Mexico City	Team
Bronze medal – third place	1977 Sofia	Team
- Last updated: April 29, 2015

Kim Ho-Chul (Korean: 김호철; born November 13, 1955) is a former volleyball player and head coach from South Korea. Kim was nicknamed magico, for his fantastic playing as a setter when he was a player in Italy. He contributed to South Korea men's national volleyball team as a setter from 1975 to 1988, and also won a gold medal in the Asian Games as a head coach in 2006. He competed at the 1984 Summer Olympics and the 1988 Summer Olympics.

He joined the Skywalkers as coach in November 2003 and led his team the champion of South Korean Volleyball Championship twice.

== Clubs ==
Player
Years	League	Club
1980–1981	Korea A	(South Korea) GS Communications Corporation
1981–1984	Serie A1	(Italy) Maxicono Parma
1984–1987	Korea A	(South Korea) Hyundai Motor Service
1987–1988	Serie A2	(Italy) Sisley Treviso
1988–1990	Serie A1	(Italy) Sisley Treviso
1990–1992	Serie A2	(Italy) Schio Sport
1992–1995	Serie A1	(Italy) Schio Sport

Coach
Years	League	Club
1995–1996	Serie A1	(Italy) Maxicono Parma
1996–1998	Serie A1	(Italy) Sisley Treviso
1998–2000	Serie A1	(Italy) Porto Ravenna
2001–2003	Serie A2	(Italy) Trieste
2003–2011	V-League	(South Korea) Cheonan Hyundai Capital Skywalkers
2012–2013	V-League	(South Korea) Seoul Rush and Cash Dream Six
2003–2015	V-League	(South Korea) Cheonan Hyundai Capital Skywalkers

== Honours ==
- 1978 Asian Games Bangkok — Gold medal
- 1979 Summer Universiad Mexico — Gold medal
- 1986 Winter League of South Korea — MVP
- 2005-2006 V-League — Best Head-coach Award
- 2006 Asian Games Doha — Gold medal
- 2006-2007 V-League — Best Head-coach Award
