= Horst Rosenfeldt =

German diver

Personal information
- Nationality: German
- Born: 8 December 1939 (age 86) Berlin, Germany

Sport
- Sport: Diving
Medal record
Men's diving
Representing West Germany
European Championships
Silver medal – second place	1958 Budapest	3 m springboard
Universiade
Silver medal – second place	1961 Sofia	Platform
Silver medal – second place	1963 Porto Alegre	3 m springboard
Silver medal – second place	1963 Porto Alegre	Platform

Horst Rosenfeldt (born 8 December 1939) is a German diver. He competed in the men's 3 metre springboard event at the 1964 Summer Olympics.
