= Valentina Poznyak =

Soviet swimmer (born 1936)

Personal information
- Born: 3 November 1936 (age 89) Moscow, Russian SFSR, Soviet Union
- Height: 1.58 m (5 ft 2 in)
- Weight: 59 kg (130 lb)

Sport
- Sport: Swimming
Medal record
Representing Soviet Union
Summer Universiade
Gold medal – first place	1959 Turin	100m butterfly
Gold medal – first place	1961 Sofia	100m butterfly

Valentina Poznyak (Russian: Валентина Позняк; born 3 November 1936) is a Soviet swimmer. She took part in the 1960 Summer Olympics in the 100 m butterfly and 4×100 m medley relay, but did not reach the finals. Between 1957 and 1962 she won six national titles and set six national records in butterfly and medley relay events.

Following the introduction of masters tournaments in the Soviet Union in 1989, she competed in this category and won several national titles between 1989 and 1999.
