= Maureen Schwartz =

Brazilian tennis player

- Country (sports): Brazil
- Born: 1946 or 1947
- Died: 29 May 2019 (aged 72)

Singles

Grand Slam singles results
- Australian Open: 1R (1965)
Medal record
Pan American Games
Silver medal – second place	1963 São Paulo	Women's doubles
Summer Universiade
Bronze medal – third place	1963 Porto Alegre	Women's doubles

Maureen Schwartz (died 29 May 2019) was a Brazilian tennis player

Schwartz, who grew up in Ceará and is of Jewish descent, was a three-time winner of the Brazilian national championships during the 1960s.

At the 1963 Pan American Games in São Paulo, Schwartz and Maria Esther Bueno paired together to claim a doubles silver medal, behind America's Darlene Hard and Carole Caldwell. She made the quarter-finals of the singles draw.

In 1965 she made her only appearance for the Brazil Federation Cup team, in a World Group quarter-final tie against France in Melbourne. She was beaten in her singles match by Janine Lieffrig, then teamed up with Maria Bueno in a live doubles rubber, which they lost in three sets to Lieffrig and Françoise Dürr. This was the first time that Schwartz had ever played on grass.
