= Maria Both =

Romanian swimmer

Personal information
- Born: 1941 (age 84–85) Târgu Mureș, Romania

Sport
- Sport: Swimming
Medal record
Women's swimming
Representing Romania
Universiade
| Silver medal – second place | 1961 Sofia | 4×100 m medley |
| Bronze medal – third place | 1961 Sofia | 100 m backstroke |

Maria Both (born 1941) is a Romanian former swimmer. She competed in the women's 100 metre backstroke at the 1956 Summer Olympics.
