= Elizabeth Ferris (diver) =

English diver

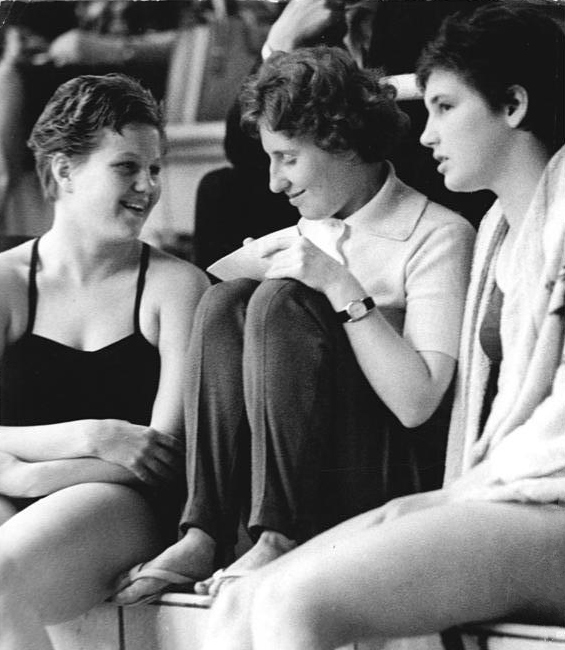
- Elizabeth Ferris (right) in 1961

Personal information
- Born: 19 November 1940 Bridgwater, Somerset, England
- Died: 12 April 2012 (aged 71)
- Height: 1.57 m (5 ft 2 in)
- Weight: 54 kg (119 lb)

Sport
- Event: Springboard diving
- Club: Mermaid; Metropolitan Diving Club
Medal record
Women's diving
Representing Great Britain
Olympic Games
Bronze medal – third place	1960 Rome	Springboard
Summer Universiade
Gold medal – first place	1961 Sofia	Springboard
Gold medal – first place	1961 Sofia	Platform
Representing England
British Empire & Commonwealth Games
Bronze medal – third place	1958 Cardiff	3m Springboard
Silver medal – second place	1962 Perth	3m Springboard

Elizabeth Anne Esther "Liz" Ferris (19 November 1940 – 12 April 2012) was a British diver. She was the third of four children (including actress Barbara Ferris) to Roy Ferris, a dairyman and Dorothy Philomena. Raised in central London, she attended Francis Holland School and was a member of the Mermaids Swimming Club which was notable for training female athletes for the Olympics. Ferris won a bronze Olympic medal in the women's 3 metre springboard event at the 1960 Rome Summer Olympics.

After her diving career, she worked in medicine and was an advocate for changing perceptions of women in sport. Her efforts were recognised by an Olympic order medal in 1980 and a lifetime achievement award by the British Olympic Association in 2011. Ferris's legacy was in her steadfast work to enhance women's opportunities in the Olympic games, as well as her work on gender biology, which encouraged the IOC to revise their definition of male and female bodies.

Ferris had one daughter to husband Julian Steven. She suffered with breast cancer from 2008 and died at home four years later in April 2012. At the time of her death, no other British female diver had won an Olympic medal in diving since her bronze medal in 1960.

== Early life ==
Ferris was born on 19 November 1940 in Bridgwater, Somerset at the Mary Stanley Nursing Home. She was the third of four children to her dairyman father Roy Ferris (1903–1975) and his wife Dorothy Philomena (1904–1990). Ferris was raised in central London, attending the private Francis Holland School. She was a member of the Mermaids Swimming Club, which had a strong tradition of training female swimmers and divers for the Olympics.

== Career ==
=== Diving ===
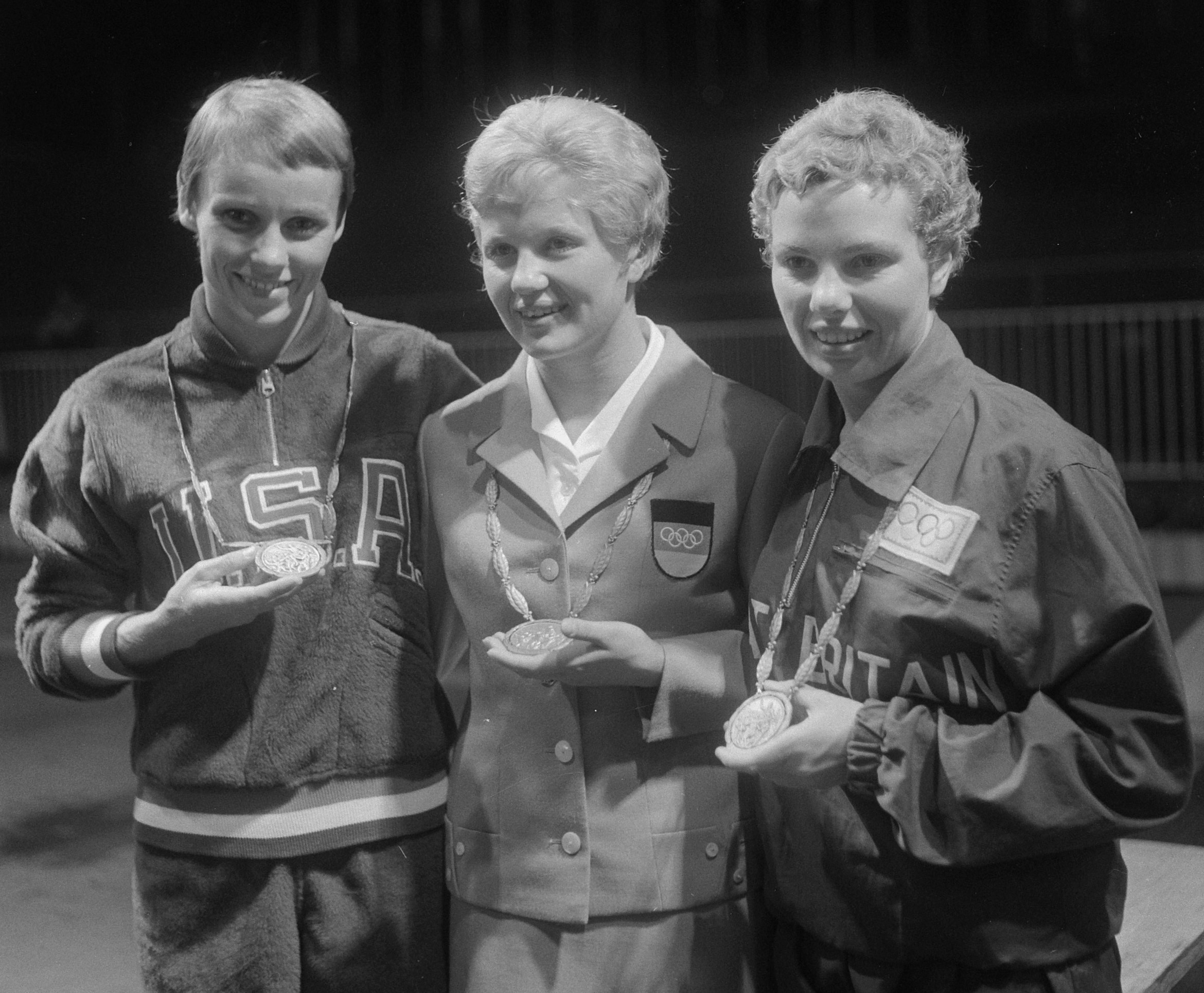
Paula Pope, Ingrid Kramer and Liz Ferris at the 1960 Olympics

Ferris had an unfavourable introduction to diving, belly-flopping on her first effort, however with training she flourished, winning her first national title in 1957.

She represented England and won a bronze medal in the 3 metre springboard at the 1958 British Empire and Commonwealth Games in Cardiff, Wales. She won a bronze medal in the 3 metre springboard event at the 1960 Summer Olympics, while training as a medical student in Greenford, Middlesex. Despite being sent to bed with a throat infection days before she was due to compete, she made a good recovery and became the first British woman since 1920 to win a medal in a diving event. She said that she was unaware of her medal win or even that she was in contention, as she did not keep track of marks awarded for each dive, believing that doing so might have affected her performances.

Two years later, she won a silver medal in the 3 metre springboard at the 1962 British Empire and Commonwealth Games in Perth, Western Australia.

=== Medicine ===
While competing internationally, Ferris was also studying medicine at the University of London. After competing in Perth in 1962, she retired from diving to focus on her medical career. In 1965, she qualified as a doctor as Middlesex Hospital and worked across hospitals in London and Gloucestershire. She was a delegate to the International Olympic Committee (IOC) in 1976, at the time its first conference on women in sport, during a period when less than 21 percent of competitors across both summer and winter Olympics were women. Ferris advocated for change, as considerably less sports were available for women than men, achieving this through conferences and commissions.

During a lecture in 1978, Ferris expressed concerns over "prescribed tests for femininity", disputing the purpose of the tests and suggesting that instead of deterring male imposters, the test prevented some women with "rare, anomalous chromosome conditions" from participating. She further suggested that there were fundamental flaws in how the test had been devised. In her 1979 article Sportswomen and medicine, she challenged long-held beliefs about the impact of motherboard and hormones on female sports performances, while criticizing the IOC's gender testing system introduced during the 1960s as 'ineffective'. Some sporting bodies chose to review their gender verification procedures in the 1980s due to Ferris's advocacy.

== Later life ==
In 1980, Ferris received a Bronze Olympic Order and in 1983, suggested that pregnant women should not participate in sports. Ferris was known to work on gender equality, notably from 1995 as part of the IOC's women and sport commission, while she also advocated sport and exercise at grassroots. In 2011, she was awarded the British Olympic Association's first lifetime achievement award. In her acceptance speech, Ferris conveyed her sense of achievement:

"Women are almost at parity at the Olympic Games in terms of the number of competitors, only just under half, but we've really made huge strides over the last 15 years in getting female athletes competing on an equal level at the Games … I hope winning this award will encourage girls in sport and show that women have an important role to play."
International Fair Play Committee website, 9 December 2011

Her award came a year prior to the 2012 Summer Olympics in London, which was the first Olympic games to have all sports open to women. She was a founder of the World Olympians Association. Ferris's legacy was in her steadfast work to enhance women's opportunities in the Olympic games, as well as her work on gender biology, which encouraged the IOC to amend their restrictive definition of male and female bodies. When recognising gender equity in the Olympic games and scientifically understanding the body's gender can be partly attributed to the work and advocacy by Ferris's.

== Personal ==
Her mother was Dolly Ferris and she was one of four children. She had an older brother Roy, an older sister, the actress, Barbara and a younger sister Christine. Through her sister Barbara, she was the sister-in-law of film director and producer John Quested.

Ferris married Robert Tyson Knights (b. 1942) on 8 May 1968, but the marriage was short-lived and on 12 November 1973, she married Canadian-born university lecturer Julian Steven (b. 1940), who later worked in investment banking. They had one daughter, Sophie, in 1978.

Since 2008, Ferris had been suffering from breast cancer and died at home in Lechlade, Gloucestershire on 12 April 2012. Her funeral was privately held at St Martin-in-the-Fields Anglican church. At the time of her death, no other British woman had won an Olympic diving medal since Ferris's 1960 bronze.
