= Bodo Nitsche =

German tennis player (1938–2017)

- Country (sports): West Germany
- Born: 24 August 1938; Beuthen, Germany
- Died: 18 February 2017 (aged 78); Stuttgart, West Germany
- Plays: Right-handed

Singles

Grand Slam singles results
- US Open: 3R (1962)
Medal record
Universiade
Gold medal – first place	1963 Porto Alegre	Men's singles
Gold medal – first place	1963 Porto Alegre	Men's doubles

Bodo Nitsche (24 August 1938 – 18 February 2017) was a German tennis player.

Raised in Stuttgart, Nitsche played Bundesliga tennis for TEC Waldau. He was a member of the West German Davis Cup squad and reached the third round of the 1962 U.S. National Championships, losing to the top seed Rod Laver. In 1963 he won the singles gold medal at the World University Games in Porto Alegre.

Nitsche worked as an engineer for Mercedes-Benz outside of tennis and had three children with wife Ingrid. His younger brother Detlev was a top collegiate player in the U.S. and played in the Wimbledon junior tournament.
