= Ursel Brunner =

German swimmer (1941–2024)

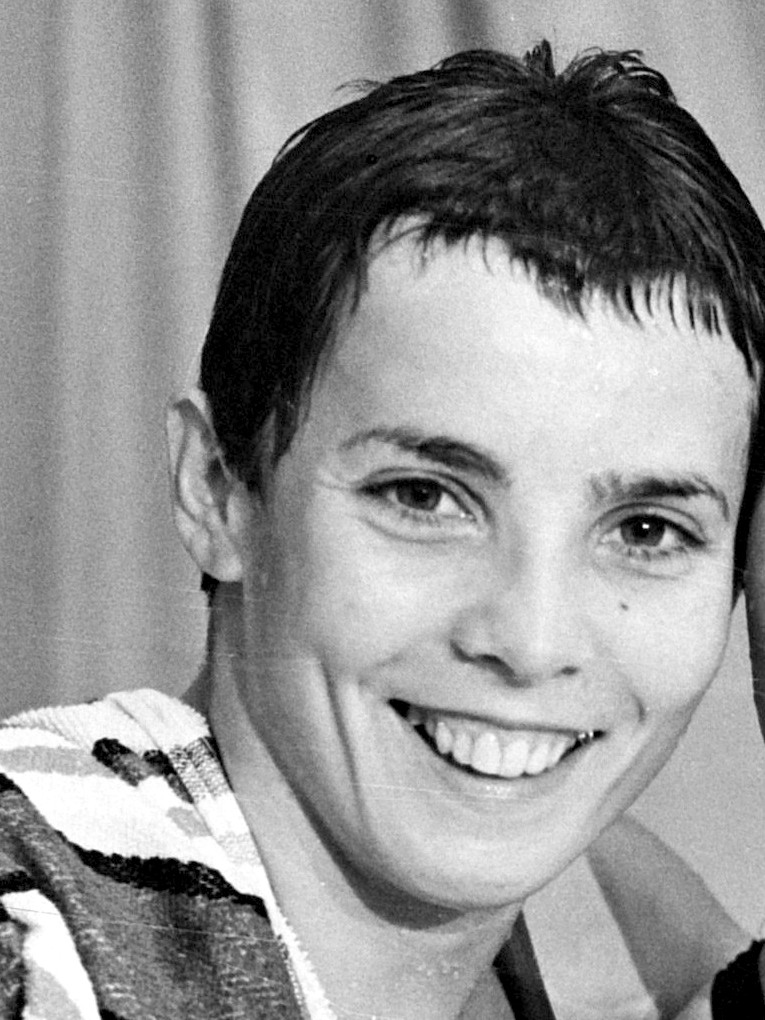
- Brunner in 1963

Personal information
- Born: 30 January 1941 Heidelberg-Ziegelhausen, Germany
- Died: 18 September 2024 (aged 83) Heidelberg
- Height: 1.65 m (5 ft 5 in)
- Weight: 55 kg (121 lb)

Sport
- Sport: Swimming
- Strokes: Freestyle
- Club: SV Nikar, Heidelberg
Medal record
Representing Germany
Olympic Games
Bronze medal – third place	1960 Rome	4×100 m freestyle relay
Bronze medal – third place	1960 Rome	4×100 m medley relay
Representing West Germany
Universiade
Gold medal – first place	1963 Porto Alegre	400 m freestyle
Bronze medal – third place	1963 Porto Alegre	100 m freestyle
Bronze medal – third place	1963 Porto Alegre	100 m backstroke

Ursula "Ursel" Brunner (German pronunciation: [ˈʊʁzl̩ ˈbʁʊnɐ]; 30 January 1941 – 18 September 2024) was a West German freestyle swimmer. She competed at the 1960 and 1964 Summer Olympics and won two bronze medals in relay events in 1960.

She won at least 15 national titles in the 100 m butterfly (1961–1962), 400 m individual medley (1962–1963), and 100 m (1959–1963) and 400 m freestyle (1957, 1959–1963). In 1963, she was selected the German Sportspersonality of the Year. In 1975 Brunner married her former coach Hans Wirth (died 1988). She had a son.

== Publications ==
- Ursel Brunner (1966). Beobachtungen und Ergebnisse bei der Behandlung von Patientinnen mit Corpuscarcinom 1955–1962.
- Ursel Brunner; Marion Knebel; Hanns Wirth (1970). Das Konditionstraining des Schwimmers: Teil 1: Trockentraining. Bartels & Wernitz.
- Ursel Brunner; Marion Knebel; Hanns Wirth (1970). 1. Trockentraining. – 1970. – 111 S.: zahlr. Ill., graph. Darst. – Literaturverz. S. 107–111. Bartels [u.] Wernitz.
- Ursel Brunner (1976). Trockentraining. Bartels, Wernitz.

Awards
Preceded by Jutta Heine	German Sportswoman of the Year; 1962	Succeeded by Roswitha Esser; Annemarie Zimmermann
