= Andrzej Salamon =

Polish swimmer (1936–2000)

Personal information
- Born: 18 August 1936 Gdynia, Poland
- Died: 8 November 2000 (aged 64) Gdańsk, Poland

Sport
- Sport: Swimming
- Strokes: Freestyle
Medal record
Men's swimming
Representing Poland
Universiade
Silver medal – second place	1959 Turin	100 m freestyle
Silver medal – second place	1961 Sofia	100 m freestyle

Andrzej Salamon (18 August 1936 – 8 November 2000) was a Polish freestyle swimmer. He competed in two events at the 1960 Summer Olympics.
