= Japan at the 1975 Summer Universiade =

- IOC code: JPN
- NOC: Japanese Olympic Committee
- Website: www.joc.or.jp (in Japanese and English)

in Rome, Italy 18 September - 21 September
- Medals: Gold 0 Silver 0 Bronze 0 Total 0

Summer Universiade appearances (overview)
- 1959; 1961; 1963; 1965; 1967; 1970; 1973; 1975; 1977; 1979; 1981; 1983; 1985; 1987; 1989; 1991; 1993; 1995; 1997; 1999; 2001; 2003; 2005; 2007; 2009; 2011; 2013; 2015; 2017; 2019; 2021; 2025; 2027

Japan competed at the 1975 Summer Universiade in Rome, Italy, from 18 to 21 September 1975.

== Background ==
The 1975 Universiade only featured athletics, other disciplines having been cancelled, as the original host Yugoslavia was unable to hold the event. The game was therefore referred to as the World University Championships in athletics.

== Competitors ==
Sport	Men	Women	Total
Athletics	4	0	4
Total	4	0	4

== Athletics ==
Athlete	Event	Qualification		Final	
Athlete	Event	Result	Rank	Result	Rank
Kazunori Koshikawa	High jump	—		2.10	8
Hiyotaka Konishi	Pole vault	—		5.00	5
Yoshiomi lwama	Pole vault	—		4.80	9
Hironobu Kobayashi	Triple jump	15.90	2	16.38	4
