= Hermann Lotter =

German swimmer (1940–2013)

Personal information
- Born: 7 March 1940 Nuremberg, Germany
- Died: 5 June 2013 (aged 73) Munich, Germany

Sport
- Sport: Swimming
Medal record
Men's swimming
Representing West Germany
Universiade
Bronze medal – third place	1961 Sofia	200 m butterfly

Hermann Lotter (7 March 1940 – 5 June 2013) was a German swimmer. He competed in the 1960 Summer Olympics and the 1964 Summer Olympics.
