= Ramón López (triple jumper) =

Cuban triple jumper (1936–2021)

Personal information
- Full name: Ramón Mariano López Fleites
- Born: 16 January 1936 Santa Clara, Cuba
- Died: 15 September 2021 (aged 85) Santa Clara, Cuba
- Height: 1.71 m (5 ft 7 in)
- Weight: 71 kg (157 lb)

Sport
- Sport: Athletics
- Event: Triple jump
Medal record
Men's Athletics
Representing Cuba
Ibero American Games
Silver medal – second place	1960 Santiago	Triple jump
Central American and Caribbean Games
Silver medal – second place	1962 Kingston	Triple jump
Pan American Games
Silver medal – second place	1963 São Paulo	Triple jump

Ramón Mariano López Fleites (16 January 1936 – 15 September 2021) was a Cuban athlete. He competed in the men's triple jump at the 1960 Summer Olympics.

== International competitions ==
Year	Competition	Venue	Position	Event	Notes
Representing Cuba
1955	Pan American Games	Mexico City, Mexico	8th	High jump	1.81 m
1960	Olympic Games	Rome, Italy	15th	Triple jump	7.51 m
1960	Ibero-American Games	Santiago, Chile	2nd	Triple jump	15.06 m
1961	Universiade	Sofia, Bulgaria	33rd (q)	Triple jump	14.53 m
1962	Central American and Caribbean Games	Kingston, Jamaica	2nd	Triple jump	15.33 m
1963	Pan American Games	São Paulo, Brazil	2nd	Triple jump	15.08 m
1963	Universiade	Porto Alegre, Brazil	5th	Triple jump	15.55 m

== Personal bests ==
- Triple jump – 15.58 metres (1964)
