= Japan at the 1977 Summer Universiade =

- IOC code: JPN
- NOC: Japanese Olympic Committee
- Website: www.joc.or.jp/english/ (in English)

in Sofia, Bulgaria 7 August – 28 August 1977
- Medals Ranked 5th: Gold 5 Silver 5 Bronze 1 Total 11

Summer Universiade appearances (overview)
- 1959; 1961; 1963; 1965; 1967; 1970; 1973; 1975; 1977; 1979; 1981; 1983; 1985; 1987; 1989; 1991; 1993; 1995; 1997; 1999; 2001; 2003; 2005; 2007; 2009; 2011; 2013; 2015; 2017; 2019; 2021; 2025; 2027

Japan participated at the 1977 Summer Universiade, in Sofia, Bulgaria. Japan finished fifth in the medal table with 5 gold, 5 silver, and a bronze medal. Gymnast Hiroshi Kajiyama was the most successful athlete with 2 gold, 3 silver, and a bronze medal

== Medal summary ==
=== Medalists ===
Medal	Name	Sport	Event
Gold	Hiroshi Kajiyama	Gymnastics	Men's individual all-around
Gold	Hiroshi Kajiyama	Gymnastics	Men's floor
Gold	Kiyoshi Goto	Gymnastics	Men's horizontal bar
Gold	Nobuo Fujisawa	Wrestling	Men's 48 kg
Gold	Kazuo Shimizu	Wrestling	Men's 52 kg
Silver	Hiroshi Kajiyama	Gymnastics	Men's horizontal bar
Silver	Hiroshi Kajiyama	Gymnastics	Men's parallel bars
Silver	Hiroshi Kajiyama; Junichi Shimizu; Kiyoshi Goto; Nobuyuki Kajitani; Shunichi Matsumoto	Gymnastics	Men's team all-around
Silver	Tsutomu Sato	Wrestling	Men's 57 kg
Silver	Tsuneo Taga	Wrestling	Men's 62 kg
Bronze	Hiroshi Kajiyama	Gymnastics	Men's pommel horse

=== Medals by sport ===
Medals by sport
Sport	1st place, gold medalist(s)	2nd place, silver medalist(s)	3rd place, bronze medalist(s)	Total
Gymnastics	3	3	1	7
Wrestling	2	2	0	4
Total	5	5	1	11
