= Paulo de Tarso Santos =

Brazilian politician

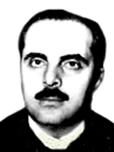
1959 portrait as Federal Deputy.

Paulo de Tarso Santos (12 January 1926 – 13 July 2019) was a Brazilian lawyer, teacher, and politician. He occupied various public roles throughout his career, including those of Minister of Education in 1963, mayor of Brasília in 1961, Federal Deputy, State Secretary for Education in São Paulo between 1983 and 1985, and councillor of the São Paulo Court of Accounts (Tribunal de Contas) from 1985 until 1991.

== Biography ==
Born in Minas Gerais, he graduated with a bachelor's degree in political and social sciences from the University of São Paulo Law School in 1949, being awarded the Rodrigues Alves Filho and Duarte de Azevedo Prizes for academic excellence. He later continued his studies in the Pontifical Catholic University of São Paulo, where he specialized in Civil Procedural Law and Business Law. He married Maria Nilse da Cunha Santos and had five children. The family's private archive was donated in 2015 to the Federal District Public Archive.

He worked as a lawyer for the Brazilian Bank of Discounts from 1948 to 1952. Entering politics through the Christian Democratic Party (PDC), Santos supported politician Jânio Quadros in his electoral campaigns. In the 1955 municipal elections, he was elected for a seat in the Municipal Chamber of São Paulo. In 1958, he was elected Federal Deputy. He later helped Jânio Quadros reach the Brazilian presidency in 1960, being nominated as mayor of Brasília by Quadros in February 1961. Santos kept the role until August, when Quadros resigned.

During his mandate as mayor of Brasília, he ordered the creation of commissions that would later kickstart public transport, cultural activities, and social services in the newly created Federal District. His actions were also important for the urbanization of the Asa Norte and Núcleo Bandeirante neighborhoods. Santos also hired the first teachers in Brasília.

He was reelected as Federal Deputy in 1962. In January 1963, he was appointed as Minister of Education by president João Goulart. He was minister from June until October 1963, having opened the games for the 1963 Summer Universiade. He returned once again to parliament, where he integrated the Federal District Commission, responsible for legislative powers in the federal capital. He opposed the Brazilian military dictatorship, having his mandate revoked by the military's first Institutional Act, which also suspended his political rights for ten years.

Besides having his mandate revoked, Santos was arrested more than once by the military dictatorship. After being freed, he went into exile in Chile from 1964 to 1971, where he worked for the United Nations. Back to Brazil, he began teaching at the Brazilian Lawyers' Institute (Instituto dos Advogados Brasileiros; IAB) in 1977. He joined the Brazilian Democratic Movement (MDB) in 1979. He also worked in Ecuador, acting as education advisor in education for that government.

In 1983, he was designated by governor Franco Montoro to the role of São Paulo Secretary of Education. Santos stayed as secretary until July 1985, when he was nominated, also by Montoro, as councillor of the São Paulo Court of Accounts, a role which he occupied until 1991. Tarso Santos was president of the Court from 1989 until 1991. After leaving the presidency of the Latin America Memorial Foundation, in 1994, he dedicated himself to private legal practice.

Santos died in July 2019, at age 93. He was buried in Gethsêmani Cemetery, in São Paulo.
