= Athletics at the 1963 Pan American Games – Men's triple jump =

Men's triple jump at the Pan American Games

The men's triple jump event at the 1963 Pan American Games was held at the Pacaembu Stadium in São Paulo on 4 May.

== Results ==
Rank	Name	Nationality	Result	Notes
1st place, gold medalist(s)	Bill Sharpe	United States	15.15	
2nd place, silver medalist(s)	Ramón López	Cuba	15.08	
3rd place, bronze medalist(s)	Mario Gomes	Brazil	14.97	
4	Herman Stokes	United States	14.92	
5	Silvio Moreira	Brazil	14.65	
6	Victor Hernández	Cuba	14.31	
	Luiz Alzamora	Peru	DNS	
	Trevor James	Trinidad and Tobago	DNS	
