= Akinori Nakayama =

Japanese gymnast (1943–2025)

Akinori Nakayama 中山彰規
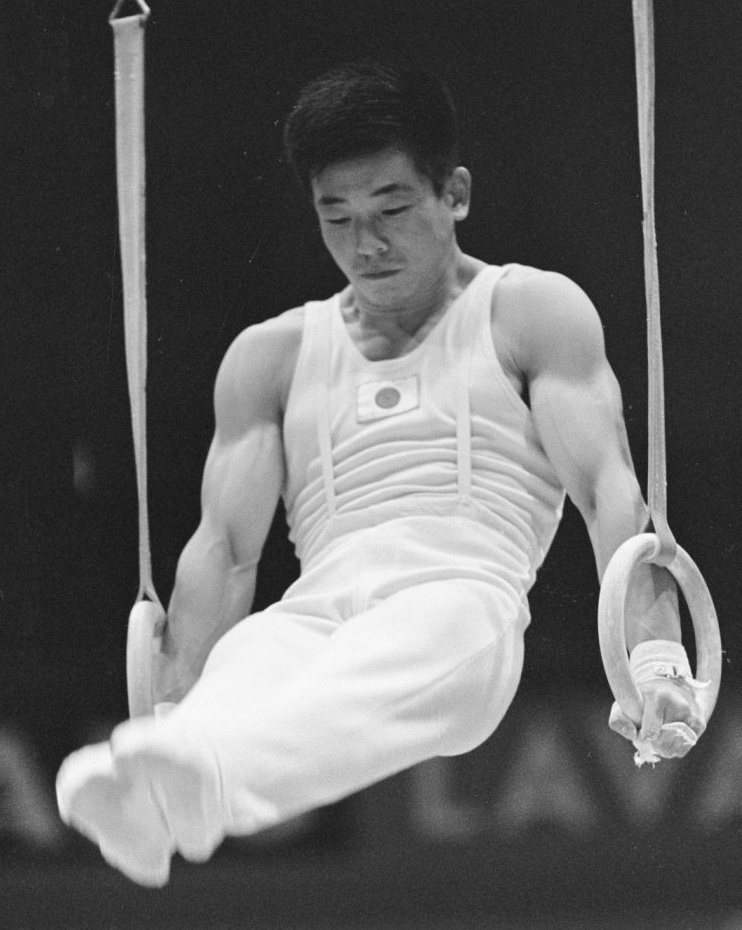
- Nakayama in 1966

Personal information
- Born: March 1, 1943 Nagoya, Japan
- Died: March 9, 2025 (aged 82)
- Height: 1.63 m (5 ft 4 in)

Gymnastics career
- Discipline: Men's artistic gymnastics
- Country represented: Japan
Medal record
Olympic Games
Gold medal – first place	1968 Mexico City	Team
Gold medal – first place	1968 Mexico City	Rings
Gold medal – first place	1968 Mexico City	Parallel bars
Gold medal – first place	1968 Mexico City	Horizontal bar
Gold medal – first place	1972 Munich	Team
Gold medal – first place	1972 Munich	Rings
Silver medal – second place	1968 Mexico City	Floor exercise
Silver medal – second place	1972 Munich	Floor exercise
Bronze medal – third place	1968 Mexico City	All-around
Bronze medal – third place	1972 Munich	All-around
World Championships
Gold medal – first place	1966 Dortmund	Team
Gold medal – first place	1966 Dortmund	Floor
Gold medal – first place	1966 Dortmund	Horizontal bar
Gold medal – first place	1970 Ljubljana	Team
Gold medal – first place	1970 Ljubljana	Floor
Gold medal – first place	1970 Ljubljana	Rings
Gold medal – first place	1970 Ljubljana	Parallel bars
Silver medal – second place	1966 Dortmund	Rings
Silver medal – second place	1970 Ljubljana	Horizontal bar
Bronze medal – third place	1966 Dortmund	All-around
Bronze medal – third place	1966 Dortmund	Vault
Bronze medal – third place	1970 Ljubljana	All-around

Akinori Nakayama (中山 彰規, Nakayama Akinori; March 1, 1943 – March 9, 2025) was a Japanese gymnast and Olympic gold medalist. Nakayama was born in Nagoya, Aichi Prefecture, and is a graduate of Chukyo University in Nagoya. Nakayama is one of only three gymnasts to become an Olympic Champion in rings twice.

== Biography ==
Nakayama won six medals at the World Championships in 1966, including three gold medals in the team all-around, the floor exercise and the horizontal bar. Two years later, with four gold, one silver and one bronze medals he became the most successful male athlete at the 1968 Summer Olympics. In 1970, he won another four world titles: in team competition, on rings, floor and parallel bars. He won four more medals at the 1972 Summer Olympics.

After retirement he was the vice-president of the Japanese Gymnastics Federation. He also served as a gymnastics coach at his alma mater, Chukyo University. In 2005, he was inducted into the International Gymnastics Hall of Fame.

Nakayama died from stomach cancer on March 9, 2025, at the age of 82.

== Competitive history ==
Year	Event	Team	AA	FX	PH	SR	VT	PB	HB
1965
1965	Summer Universiade	1st place, gold medalist(s)	1st place, gold medalist(s)						
1966
1966	World Championships	1st place, gold medalist(s)	3rd place, bronze medalist(s)	1st place, gold medalist(s)		2nd place, silver medalist(s)	3rd place, bronze medalist(s)		1st place, gold medalist(s)
1967
1967	All Japan Championships		1st place, gold medalist(s)						
1967	NHK Trophy		1st place, gold medalist(s)						
1967	Summer Universiade	1st place, gold medalist(s)	1st place, gold medalist(s)						
1968	All Japan Championships		1st place, gold medalist(s)						
1968	Olympic Games	1st place, gold medalist(s)	3rd place, bronze medalist(s)	2nd place, silver medalist(s)	12	1st place, gold medalist(s)	5	1st place, gold medalist(s)	1st place, gold medalist(s)
1969	NHK Trophy		1st place, gold medalist(s)						
1970	All Japan Championships		1st place, gold medalist(s)						
1970	NHK Trophy		1st place, gold medalist(s)						
1970	World Championships	1st place, gold medalist(s)	3rd place, bronze medalist(s)	1st place, gold medalist(s)		1st place, gold medalist(s)	6	1st place, gold medalist(s)	2nd place, silver medalist(s)
1971	All Japan Championships		1st place, gold medalist(s)						
1972
1972	Summer Olympics	1st place, gold medalist(s)	3rd place, bronze medalist(s)	2nd place, silver medalist(s)	7	1st place, gold medalist(s)	12	5	5

== See also ==
- List of multiple Olympic gold medalists
- List of multiple Olympic gold medalists at a single Games
- List of multiple Olympic medalists
- List of Olympic medal leaders in men's gymnastics
