= Yoshiaki Shikiishi =

Japanese swimmer (born 1941)

Personal information
- Nationality: Japanese
- Born: 6 October 1941 (age 84)

Sport
- Sport: Swimming
Medal record
Representing Japan
Summer Universiade
Gold medal – first place	1961 Sofia	4x100m medley relay
Silver medal – second place	1961 Sofia	200m breaststroke

Yoshiaki Shikiishi (敷石 義秋, Shikiishi Yoshiaki; born 6 October 1941) is a Japanese former swimmer. He competed in the men's 200 metre breaststroke at the 1964 Summer Olympics.
