= Haruo Yoshimuta =

Japanese swimmer (1939–2025)

Personal information
- Nationality: Japan
- Born: Haruo Nihongo Yoshimuta; 5 November 1939 Keijō, Korea, Empire of Japan
- Died: 5 March 2025 (aged 85) Kitakyushu, Japan

Sport
- Sport: Swimming
Medal record
Representing Japan
Summer Universiade
Gold medal – first place	1961 Sofia	200m butterfly
Gold medal – first place	1961 Sofia	4x100m freestyle relay
Gold medal – first place	1961 Sofia	4x100m medley relay
Gold medal – first place	1963 Porto Alegre	400m freestyle
Gold medal – first place	1963 Porto Alegre	1500m freestyle
Gold medal – first place	1963 Porto Alegre	4x100m freestyle relay
Asian Games
Gold medal – first place	1966 Bangkok	4x200m freestyle relay

Haruo Yoshimuta (吉無田 春男, Yoshimuta Haruo; 5 November 1939 – 5 March 2025) was a Japanese swimmer who competed in the 1960 Summer Olympics in the 200 Metres Butterfly, and in the 1964 Summer Olympics in the 400 Metres Freestyle. Haruo died from heart failure in Kitakyushu, on 5 March 2025, at the age of 85.
