= Tatsuo Fujimoto =

Japanese swimmer (born 1940)

Personal information
- Native name: 藤本達夫
- Born: 29 March 1940 (age 86) Hyōgo, Empire of Japan

Sport
- Sport: Swimming
- Strokes: Freestyle
Medal record
Men's swimming
Representing Japan
Olympic Games
Silver medal – second place	1960 Rome	4×200 m freestyle
Asian Games
Gold medal – first place	1958 Tokyo	4×200 m freestyle
Silver medal – second place	1958 Tokyo	200 m freestyle
Universiade
Gold medal – first place	1961 Sofia	400 m freestyle
Gold medal – first place	1961 Sofia	4×100 m freestyle
Gold medal – first place	1961 Sofia	4×100 m medley
Gold medal – first place	1963 Porto Alegre	4×100 m freestyle
Bronze medal – third place	1961 Sofia	1500 m freestyle

Tatsuo Fujimoto (藤本 達夫, Fujimoto Tatsuo) (born 29 March 1940 in Hyōgo Prefecture) is a Japanese swimmer and Olympic medalist. He participated at the 1960 Summer Olympics, winning a silver medal in 4 x 200 metre freestyle relay.
