= Tadao Tosa =

Japanese diver

Personal information
- Nationality: Japanese
- Born: 27 July 1942 (age 83) Japan

Sport
- Sport: Diving
Medal record
Men's diving
Representing Japan
Universiade
Gold medal – first place	1961 Sofia	Platform

Tadao Tosa (土佐 忠雄, Tosa Tadao; born 27 July 1942) is a Japanese former diver who competed in the 1964 Summer Olympics.
