= Shunsuke Kaneto =

Japanese diver (born 1940)

Personal information
- Nationality: Japanese
- Born: 5 January 1940 (age 86) Japan

Sport
- Sport: Diving
Medal record
Men's diving
Representing Japan
Universiade
Gold medal – first place	1961 Sofia	Springboard
Gold medal – first place	1963 Porto Alegre	3 m springboard
Gold medal – first place	1963 Porto Alegre	Platform

Shunsuke Kaneto (金戸 俊介, Kaneto Shunsuke; born 5 January 1940) is a former Japanese diver who competed in the 1960 Summer Olympics and in the 1964 Summer Olympics.
