= Koshikawa =

Koshikawa (written: 越川) is a Japanese surname. Notable people with the surname include:

- Kazunori Koshikawa (越川 一紀, born 1956), Japanese high jumper
- Yu Koshikawa (越川 優, born 1984), Japanese volleyball player
