= Shigeo Fukushima =

Japanese swimmer (1943–1998)

Personal information
- Full name: Shigeo Fukushima
- Nationality: Japanese
- Born: 2 January 1943 Japan
- Died: 1 June 1998 (aged 55)
- Height: 1.81 m (5 ft 11 in)
- Weight: 75 kg (165 lb)

Sport
- Sport: Swimming
- Strokes: Backstroke
Medal record
Men's swimming
Representing Japan
Summer Universiade
Gold medal – first place	1961 Sofia	100 m backstroke
Gold medal – first place	1961 Sofia	4×100 m medley
Bronze medal – third place	1967 Tokyo	200 m backstroke
Asian Games
Gold medal – first place	1966 Bangkok	200 m backstroke
Gold medal – first place	1966 Bangkok	400 m medley
Gold medal – first place	1966 Bangkok	4×100 m medley

Shigeo Fukushima (福島 滋雄, Fukushima Shigeo; 2 January 1943 – 1 June 1998) was a Japanese swimmer who competed in the 1964 Summer Olympics.
