= Gymnastics at the 1965 Summer Universiade =

Budapest 1965

The Gymnastics competitions in the 1965 Summer Universiade were held in Budapest, Hungary.

== Men's events ==
Event	Gold	Silver	Bronze
Individual all-around	Akinori Nakayama (JPN)	Miroslav Cerar (YUG)	Makoto Sakamoto (USA)
Team all-around	Japan (JPN)	Soviet Union (URS)	Yugoslavia (YUG)

== Women's events ==
Event	Gold	Silver	Bronze
Individual all-around	Aniko Ducza (HUN)	Galina Buruzheva (URS)	Katalin Makray (HUN)
Team all-around	Hungary (HUN)	Soviet Union (URS)	Bulgaria (BUL)

=== Medal table ===
Rank	Nation	Gold	Silver	Bronze	Total
1	Hungary (HUN)	2	0	1	3
2	Japan (JPN)	2	0	0	2
3	Soviet Union (URS)	0	3	0	3
4	Yugoslavia (YUG)	0	1	1	2
5	Bulgaria (BUL)	0	0	1	1
5	United States (USA)	0	0	1	1
Totals (6 entries)		4	4	4	12
