= Athletics at the 1963 Summer Universiade – Men's 1500 metres =

The men's 1500 metres event at the 1963 Summer Universiade was held at the Estádio Olímpico Monumental in Porto Alegre in September 1963.

== Results ==
Rank	Athlete	Nationality	Time	Notes
1st place, gold medalist(s)	John Whetton	Great Britain	3:49.5	
2nd place, silver medalist(s)	Mamoru Morimoto	Japan	3:49.6	
3rd place, bronze medalist(s)	Karl Eyerkaufer	West Germany	3:49.7	
4	Satsuo Iwashita	Japan	3:50.1	
5	Valentin Karaulov	Soviet Union	3:50.3	
6	Béla Szekeres	Hungary	3:50.8	
7	Bernard Tucker	Great Britain	3:51.0	
	Karl-Heinz Czock	West Germany	?	
	José de Azevedo	Brazil	?	
	Norbert Haupert	Luxembourg	?	
	Pedro Prado Filho	Brazil	?	
	Leonid Ivanov	Soviet Union	?	
	Attila Simon	Hungary	?	
	Fritz Holzer	Switzerland	?	
