= Keigo Shimizu =

Japanese Olympic swimmer (born 1939)

Personal information
- Native name: 清水啓吾
- National team: Japan
- Born: 2 July 1939 (age 87)

Sport
- Sport: Swimming
- Strokes: Freestyle
Medal record
Men's swimming
Representing Japan
Olympic Games
Bronze medal – third place	1960 Rome	4×100 m medley
Universiade
Gold medal – first place	1961 Sofia	100 m freestyle
Gold medal – first place	1961 Sofia	4×100 m freestyle
Asian Games
Gold medal – first place	1962 Jakarta	100 m freestyle
Gold medal – first place	1962 Jakarta	4×200 m freestyle
Gold medal – first place	1962 Jakarta	4×100 m medley

Keigo Shimizu (清水 啓吾, Shimizu Keigo) (born 2 July 1939) is a Japanese swimmer and Olympic medallist. He participated at the 1960 Summer Olympics in Rome, winning a bronze medal in 4 x 100 metre medley relay.
