= Athletics at the 1961 Summer Universiade – Men's long jump =

The men's long jump event at the 1961 Summer Universiade was held at the Vasil Levski National Stadium in Sofia, Bulgaria, on 31 August and 1 September 1961.

== Medalists ==
Gold	Silver	Bronze
Igor Ter-Ovanesyan; Soviet Union	Takayuki Okazaki; Japan	Ivan Ivanov; Bulgaria

== Results ==
=== Qualifications ===
Rank	Name	Nationality	Result	Notes
	Igor Ter-Ovanesyan	Soviet Union	7.64	q
	Takayuki Okazaki	Japan	7.20	q
	Ivan Ivanov	Bulgaria	7.10	q
	Maurizio Terenziani	Italy	7.07	q
	Pedro de Almeida	Portugal	6.96	q
	Wolfgang Klein	West Germany	6.95	q
	Katsumi Hanada	Japan	6.91	q
	László Mihályfi	Hungary	6.85	q
	Newton de Castro	Brazil	6.82	q
	Todor Dashkov	Bulgaria	6.77	q
	Harald Ihmig	West Germany	6.72	q
13	Hüseyin Çakmak	Turkey	6.65	
14	Sabaudin Ramku	Albania	6.31	
15	Antonio Bortoli	Italy	6.20	
16	Ramanathan Sundaralingama	Ceylon	5.64	

=== Final ===
Rank	Athlete	Nationality	Result	Notes
1st place, gold medalist(s)	Igor Ter-Ovanesyan	Soviet Union	7.90 (w)	
2nd place, silver medalist(s)	Takayuki Okazaki	Japan	7.67 (w)	
3rd place, bronze medalist(s)	Ivan Ivanov	Bulgaria	7.58 (w)	
4	Aarre Asiala	Finland	7.54	
5	Wolfgang Klein	West Germany	7.45	
6	Katsumi Hanada	Japan	7.31	
7	Newton de Castro	Brazil	7.22	
8	Harald Ihmig	West Germany	7.18	
9	Todor Dashkov	Bulgaria	6.99	
10	Pedro de Almeida	Portugal	6.91	
	László Mihályfi	Hungary	DNS	
	Maurizio Terenziani	Italy	DNS	
