= Katalin Makray =

Hungarian gymnast (born 1945)

Katalin Makray-Schmitt
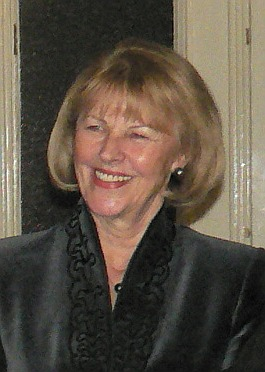
- Makray in 2011

First Lady of Hungary
- In role 6 August 2010 – 2 April 2012
- President: Pál Schmitt
- Preceded by: Erzsébet Sólyom
- Succeeded by: Anita Herczegh

Personal details
- Born: Katalin Makray; 5 April 1945 (age 81) Vasvár, Kingdom of Hungary
- Spouse: Pál Schmitt (m. 1966)
- Children: 3, including Petra

Medal record

Women's gymnastics

Representing Hungary

Olympic Games
Silver medal – second place	1964 Tokyo	Uneven bars

Katalin Makray-Schmitt (born 5 April 1945) is a Hungarian former gymnast who competed at the 1964 and 1968 Summer Olympics. She won silver on the uneven bars at the 1964 Olympics.

She is the spouse of former President of Hungary Pál Schmitt and served as the First Lady of Hungary from 2010 to 2012, during her husband's presidency at the Sándor Palace.

== Gymnastics career ==
Makray was born in Vasvár. She moved to Budapest as a child, where she began gymnastics at age 10. Her coaches included Margit Csillik. She joined the national team at a young age.

She won eight Hungarian national tiles. At the 1962 World Championships, she placed 6th in the uneven bars final as well as fourth in the team competition with her teammates. At the 1963 Summer Universiade, she won the individual all-around, tied with Larisa Latynina, as well as the team competition. Two years later, at the 1965 Summer Universiade, she won an individual bronze and a second team gold medal.

Makray was selected for the 1964 Summer Olympics and won silver on the uneven bars. Her last year of competition was 1968, when she was selected again for the 1968 Summer Olympics, where she placed fifth in the team competition with her Hungarian teammates.

Makray met her future husband at a training camp.

== Post-gymnastics career ==
Makray became a professional trainer. She was influential in introducing aerobics to Hungary and was a founding member of the Hungarian team. She was the protocol director at the 2002 World Artistic Gymnastics Championships, held in Hungary.

== Personal life ==
Makray has three daughters, who all played tennis; her daughter Petra Schmitt became a professional tennis player.

Honorary titles
Preceded by Erzsébet Sólyom	First Lady of Hungary; 2010–2012	Succeeded by Anita Herczegh
