= Mitsuru Motoi =

Japanese tennis player (1941–2025)

- Country (sports): Japan
- Born: 29 August 1941; Yao City, Japan
- Died: 27 August 2025 (aged 83)
- Height: 174 cm (5 ft 9 in)

Singles
- Highest ranking: No. 245 (6 Nov 1974)

Grand Slam singles results
- Australian Open: 1R (1965)
Medal record
Universiade
Silver medal – second place	1961 Sofia	Men's doubles
Silver medal – second place	1963 Porto Alegre	Men's doubles
Bronze medal – third place	1963 Porto Alegre	Men's singles

Mitsuru Motoi (29 August 1941 – 27 August 2025) was a Japanese professional tennis player.

== Biography ==
Born in Yao City, Motoi was a graduate of Kwansei Gakuin University and won a singles bronze medal for Japan at the 1963 Summer Universiade. He was beaten in five sets by Koji Watanabe in the singles final of the 1964 All-Japan championships. In 1965 he played in a Davis Cup tie for the only time, against South Korea in Seoul, winning both his singles and doubles rubber. In 1973 he won the All-Japan championships in mixed doubles.

Motoi previously served as manager of the national team for the Davis Cup, Federation Cup and Seoul Olympics.

Motoi died on 27 August 2025, at the age of 83.

== See also ==
- List of Japan Davis Cup team representatives
