= Ivan Karetnikov =

Soviet swimmer

Personal information
- Born: 1942 (age 83–84) Stalingrad, Russian SFSR, Soviet Union

Sport
- Sport: Swimming
- Club: Burevestnik
Medal record
Representing Soviet Union
European Championships
Silver medal – second place	1962 Leipzig	200 m breaststroke
Universiade
Gold medal – first place	1963 Porto Alegre	200 m breaststroke

Ivan Karetnikov (Russian: Иван Каретников; born 1942) is a retired Soviet swimmer who specialized in the 200 m breaststroke. In this event, he won a silver medal at the 1962 European Aquatics Championships and a gold medal at the 1963 Universiade, and set three European records between 1962 and 1963.
