= Volleyball at the 1963 Summer Universiade =

Volleyball events were contested at the 1963 Summer Universiade in Porto Alegre, Brazil.

Event	Gold	Silver	Bronze
Men's volleyball	Soviet Union (URS)	Czechoslovakia (TCH)	Brazil (BRA)
Women's volleyball	Brazil (BRA)	Peru (PER)	Chile (CHI)
