= Gymnastics at the 1977 Summer Universiade =

International fencing championship event

- Venue: National Sports Academy "Vasil Levski"
- Dates: 19–21 August 1977
- Competitors: 131 from 21 nations

The gymnastics events at the 1977 Summer Universiade were held from August 19 to 21, 1977, at the National Sports Academy "Vasil Levski" Gymnasium in Sofia, Bulgaria.

== Medal table ==
Rank	Nation	Gold	Silver	Bronze	Total
1	Soviet Union (URS)	2	2	1	5
2	Japan (JPN)	1	1	0	2
2	Romania (ROU)	1	1	0	2
4	Bulgaria (BUL)	0	0	2	2
5	China (CHN)	0	0	1	1
Totals (5 entries)		4	4	4	12

== Men's events ==
Event	Gold	Silver	Bronze
Individual all-around	Hiroshi Kajiyama (JPN)	Vladimir Markelov (URS)	Vladimir Tichonov (URS)
Team all-around	Soviet Union (URS)	Japan (JPN)	China (CHN)

== Women's events ==
Event	Gold	Silver	Bronze
Individual all-around	Alina Goreac (ROM)	Antonina Glebova (URS)	Nadia Chatarova (BUL)
Team all-around	Soviet Union (URS)	Romania (ROM)	Bulgaria (BUL)
