= Volleyball at the 1973 Summer Universiade =

Volleyball events were contested at the 1973 Summer Universiade in Moscow, Soviet Union.

Event	Gold	Silver	Bronze
Men's volleyball	Soviet Union (URS)	Cuba (CUB)	South Korea (KOR)
Women's volleyball	Soviet Union (URS)	Bulgaria (BUL)	Brazil (BRA)
