= Volleyball at the 1999 Summer Universiade =

Volleyball events were contested at the 1999 Summer Universiade in Palma de Mallorca, Spain.

Event	Gold	Silver	Bronze
Men's volleyball	Germany (GER)	Japan (JPN)	Spain (ESP)
Women's volleyball	China (CHN)	Russia (RUS)	France (FRA)
