= Mamoru Morimoto =

Japanese middle-distance runner (1939–2021)

Personal information
- Born: 11 July 1939 Ise, Mie, Japan
- Died: 28 February 2021 (aged 81) Mitaka, Tokyo, Japan

Sport
- Sport: Track and field
Medal record
Representing Japan
Summer Universiade
Gold medal – first place	1963 Porto Alegre	800m
Silver medal – second place	1963 Porto Alegre	1500m
Asian Games
Gold medal – first place	1962 Jakarta	800m
Bronze medal – third place	1962 Jakarta	4x400m relay
Bronze medal – third place	1966 Bangkok	800m

Mamoru Morimoto (森本 葵, Morimoto Mamoru; 11 July 1939 – 28 February 2021) was a Japanese middle distance runner who competed in the 1964 Summer Olympics. His daughter Tsuru Morimoto is a former footballer who played for the Japanese national team.
