= Volleyball at the 1981 Summer Universiade =

Volleyball events were contested at the 1981 Summer Universiade in Bucharest, Romania.

Event	Gold	Silver	Bronze
Men's volleyball	Romania (ROM)	Cuba (CUB)	Japan (JPN)
Women's volleyball	China (CHN)	Cuba (CUB)	Brazil (BRA)
