= Gymnastics at the 1961 Summer Universiade =

The Gymnastics competitions in the 1961 Summer Universiade were held in Sofia, Bulgaria.

== Events ==
Event	Gold	Silver	Bronze
Men's individual all-around	Takashi Mitsukuri (JPN)	Yuri Titov (URS)	Velik Kapsasov (BUL)
Women's individual all-around	Irina Pervushina (URS)	Tamara Lyukhina (URS)	Tamara Manina (URS)

=== Medal table ===
Rank	Nation	Gold	Silver	Bronze	Total
1	Soviet Union (URS)	1	2	1	4
2	Japan (JPN)	1	0	0	1
3	Bulgaria (BUL)	0	0	1	1
Totals (3 entries)		2	2	2	6
