= Tennis at the 1963 Summer Universiade =

Tennis events were contested at the 1963 Summer Universiade in Porto Alegre, Brazil.

== Medal summary ==
| Event | Gold | Silver | Bronze |
|---|---|---|---|
| Men's Singles | Bodo Nitsche (FRG) | Giordano Maioli (ITA) | Mitsuru Motoi (JPN) |
| Men's Doubles | Bodo Nitsche and Lothar Pawlik (FRG) | Takeshi Koura and Mitsuru Motoi (JPN) | Giordano Maioli and Stefano Gaudenzi (ITA) |
| Women's Singles | Jitka Horcicková (TCH) | Irina Ermolova (URS) | Maria Teresa Riedl (ITA) |
| Women's Doubles | Gyorgyi Feher and Zsuzsa Kunovits (HUN) | Mary Puljak and Doris Silva (URU) | Helena Monteiro and Maureen Schwartz (BRA) |
| Mixed Doubles | Maria Teresa Riedl and Giordano Maioli (ITA) | Anick Larue and Michel Leclerq (FRA) | Gerda Hausslein and Gerhard Müller (FRG) |

== Medal table ==
| Rank | Nation | Gold | Silver | Bronze | Total |
|---|---|---|---|---|---|
| 1 | West Germany (FRG) | 2 | 0 | 1 | 3 |
| 2 | Italy (ITA) | 1 | 1 | 2 | 4 |
| 3 | Czechoslovakia (TCH) | 1 | 0 | 0 | 1 |
| 3 | Hungary (HUN) | 1 | 0 | 0 | 1 |
| 5 | Japan (JPN) | 0 | 1 | 1 | 2 |
| 6 | France (FRA) | 0 | 1 | 0 | 1 |
| 6 | Soviet Union (URS) | 0 | 1 | 0 | 1 |
| 6 | Uruguay (URU) | 0 | 1 | 0 | 1 |
| 9 | Brazil (BRA) | 0 | 0 | 1 | 1 |
| Totals (9 entries) | | 5 | 5 | 5 | 15 |

== See also ==
- Tennis at the Summer Universiade
