= Volleyball at the 1985 Summer Universiade =

Volleyball events were contested at the 1985 Summer Universiade in Kobe, Japan.

| Event | Gold | Silver | Bronze |
|---|---|---|---|
| Men's volleyball | Japan (JPN) | Soviet Union (URS) | Italy (ITA) |
| Women's volleyball | Japan (JPN) | North Korea (PRK) | West Germany (FRG) |
