= Athletics at the 1961 Summer Universiade – Men's triple jump =

The men's triple jump event at the 1961 Summer Universiade was held at the Vasil Levski National Stadium in Sofia, Bulgaria, on 3 September 1961.

== Results ==
Rank	Athlete	Nationality	Result	Notes
1st place, gold medalist(s)	Sorin Ioan	Romania	15.93	
2nd place, silver medalist(s)	Oleg Ryakhovskiy	Soviet Union	15.85	
3rd place, bronze medalist(s)	Tomio Ota	Japan	15.65	
4	Satoshi Shimo	Japan	15.58	
5	Gyula Czapalai	Hungary	15.48	
6	Norbert Hermann	West Germany	15.14	
7	Ramón López	Cuba	14.93	
8	Pierluigi Gatti	Italy	14.91	
9	Kiril Kirchev	Bulgaria	14.87	
10	Ze'ev Reiss	Israel	14.07	
11	Hüseyin Çakmak	Turkey	14.01	
12	Sabaudin Ramku	Albania	12.95	
