= Gymnastics at the 1983 Summer Universiade =

The gymnastics competitions in the 1983 Summer Universiade were held at the Northlands Coliseum in Edmonton, Alberta, Canada.

== Competition format ==
The artistic gymnastics competition was carried out in three stages:

- Competition I - The team competition/qualification round in which all gymnasts, including those who were not part of a team, performed both compulsory and optional exercises. The combined scores of all team members determined the final score of the team. The thirty-six highest scoring gymnasts in the all-around qualified to the individual all-around competition. The six highest scoring gymnasts on each apparatus qualified to the final for that apparatus.
- Competition II - The individual all-around competition, in which those who qualified from Competition I performed exercises on each apparatus. The final score of each gymnast was composed of half the points earned by that gymnast during Competition I and all of the points earned by him or her in Competition II.
- Competition III - The apparatus finals, in which those who qualified during Competition I performed an exercise on the individual apparatus on which he or she had qualified. The final score of each gymnast was composed of half the points earned by that gymnast on that particular apparatus during Competition I and all of the points earned by him or her on that particular apparatus in Competition III.

Each country was limited to three gymnasts in the all-around final and two gymnasts in each apparatus final.

== Men's Event ==
Event	Gold	Silver	Bronze
Individual all-around	Yuri Korolev (URS)	Vladimir Artemov (URS)	Aleksandr Pogorelov (URS)
Rings	Levente Molnár (ROM)	James Hartung (USA)	Peter Vidmar (USA)
Pommel horse	Aleksandr Pogorelov (URS)	Yuri Korolev (URS)	Toshiya Muramatsu (JPN)
Vault	Lou Yun (CHN)	Warren Long (CAN)	Valentin Pintea (ROM)
Floor exercise	Yuri Korolev (URS)	Vladimir Artemov (URS)	Huang Wofu (CHN)
Parallel bars	Huang Wofu (CHN)	Vladimir Artemov (URS)	James Hartung (USA)
Bars	Philippe Chartrand (CAN)	Yuri Korolev (URS)	James Hartung (USA)
Team all-around	Soviet Union (URS)	China (CHN)	United States (USA)

== Women's Event ==
Event	Gold	Silver	Bronze
Individual all-around	Natalia Yurchenko (URS)	Mihaela Riciu (ROM) Emilia Eberle (ROM)	
Uneven Bars	Natalia Yurchenko (URS)	Jana Gajdošová (TCH)	Mihaela Riciu (ROM)
Balance Beam	Natalia Yurchenko (URS)	Wen Jia (CHN)	Anita Botnen (CAN)
Vault	Natalia Yurchenko (URS)	Elena Veselova (URS)	Mihaela Riciu (ROM)
Floor Exercise	Liliana Balan (ROM)	Mihaela Riciu (ROM)	Elena Veselova (URS)
Team all-around	Soviet Union (URS)	Romania (ROM)	Canada (CAN)

=== Medal table ===
Rank	Nation	Gold	Silver	Bronze	Total
1	Soviet Union (URS)	9	6	2	17
2	Romania (ROU)	2	4	3	9
3	China (CHN)	2	2	1	5
4	Canada (CAN)	1	1	2	4
5	United States (USA)	0	1	4	5
6	Czechoslovakia (TCH)	0	1	0	1
7	Japan (JPN)	0	0	1	1
Totals (7 entries)		14	15	13	42
