= Swimming at the 1963 Summer Universiade =

Swimming at the III Summer Universiade

The swimming competition at the 1963 Summer Universiade took place in Porto Alegre, Brazil.

== Men’s events ==
Event	Gold		Silver		Bronze	
100 m freestyle	Hans-Joachim Klein (FRG)	54.4	Makoto Fukui (JPN)	56.4	Gyula Dobai (HUN)	56.8
400 m freestyle	Haruo Yoshimuta (JPN)	4:26.6	Murray McLachlan (RSA)	4:29.5	Hans-Joachim Klein (FRG)	4:31.1
1500 m freestyle	Haruo Yoshimuta (JPN)	18:04.8	Pyotr Pikalov (URS)	18:04.9	Murray McLachlan (RSA)	18:20.6
200 m backstroke	József Csikány (HUN)	2:19.9	Jan Weeteling (NED)	2:22.3	Julio Cabrera (ESP)	2:23.9
200 m breaststroke	Ivan Karetnikov (URS)	2:37.2	Nazario Padrón (ESP)	2:42.2	Jan Gross (FRG)	2:42.4
200 m butterfly	Valentin Kuzmin (URS)	2:16.0	Fritz Dennerlein (ITA)	2:16.8	Isao Nakajima (JPN)	2:18.6
4 × 100 m freestyle relay	Japan (JPN); Toshizo Umemoto; Haruo Yoshimuta; Kiyoshi Fukui; Tatsuo Fujimoto	3:47.8	Hungary (HUN)	3:48.7	Italy (ITA)	3:49.8
4 × 100 m medley relay	Hungary (HUN)	4:14.4	Italy (ITA)	4:15.2	West Germany (FRG)	4:18.7

== Women’s events ==
Event	Gold		Silver		Bronze	
100 m freestyle	Csilla Madarász (HUN)	1:04.4	Mária Frank (HUN)	1:05.3	Ursel Brunner (FRG)	1:05.8
400 m freestyle	Ursel Brunner (FRG)	5:07.3	Mária Frank (HUN)	5:11.1	Hilda Zeier (YUG)	5:13.8
100 m backstroke	Mária Balla (HUN)	1:12.7	Olga Korényi (HUN)	1:13.3	Ursel Brunner (FRG)	1:16.3
200 m breaststroke	Márta Egerváry (HUN)	2:54.9	Michèle Pialat (FRA)	2:59.8	Lisa Barth (BRA)	3:12.0
100 m butterfly	Márta Egerváry (HUN)	1:10.4	Olga Korényi (HUN)	1:14.0	Ankie Hulsebos (NED)	1:15.6
4 × 100 m freestyle relay	Hungary (HUN)	4:25.0	France (FRA)	5:03.7	Brazil (BRA)	5:13.7
4 × 100 m medley relay	Hungary (HUN)	4:52.6	France (FRA)	5:23.0	Brazil (BRA)	5:55.1

== Medal table ==
Rank	Nation	Gold	Silver	Bronze	Total
1	Hungary (HUN)	8	5	1	14
2	Japan (JPN)	3	1	1	5
3	Soviet Union (URS)	2	1	0	3
4	West Germany (FRG)	2	0	5	7
5	France (FRA)	0	3	0	3
6	Italy (ITA)	0	2	1	3
7	Netherlands (NED)	0	1	1	2
7	South Africa (RSA)	0	1	1	2
7	Spain (ESP)	0	1	1	2
10	Brazil (BRA)	0	0	3	3
11	Yugoslavia (YUG)	0	0	1	1
Totals (11 entries)		15	15	15	45
