= Volleyball at the 1959 Summer Universiade =

Volleyball events were contested at the 1959 Summer Universiade in Turin, Italy.

Event	Gold	Silver	Bronze
Men's volleyball	Czechoslovakia (TCH)	Romania (ROM)	Poland (POL)
