= Volleyball at the 1983 Summer Universiade =

Volleyball events were contested at the 1983 Summer Universiade in Edmonton, Alberta, Canada.

| Event | Gold | Silver | Bronze |
|---|---|---|---|
| Men's volleyball | Cuba (CUB) | Canada (CAN) | Italy (ITA) |
| Women's volleyball | Brazil (BRA) | China (CHN) | Japan (JPN) |
