= Volleyball at the 2007 Summer Universiade =

Volleyball events were contested at the 2007 Summer Universiade in Bangkok, Thailand.

Event	Gold	Silver	Bronze
Men's Volleyball	Turkey	Canada	United States
Women's Volleyball	Poland	Serbia	China
