= Diving at the 1963 Summer Universiade =

The Diving competition in the 1963 Summer Universiade in Porto Alegre, Brazil.

== Medal overview ==
Event	Gold	Silver	Bronze
Men's 3-Meter Springboard	Shunsuke Kaneto (JPN)	Horst Rosenfeld (FRG)	Masaru Ito (JPN)
Men's Platform	Shunsuke Kaneto (JPN)	Horst Rosenfeld (FRG)	Masaru Ito (JPN)
Women's 3-Meter Springboard	Ursel Hilss (FRG)	Helga Berg (FRG)	Tuzi Sato (BRA)
Women's Platform	Bärbel Urban (FRG)	Helga Berg (FRG)	Tuzi Sato (BRA)

== Medal table ==
* Host nation (Brazil)

Rank	Nation	Gold	Silver	Bronze	Total
1	Germany (GER)	2	4	0	6
2	Japan (JPN)	2	0	2	4
3	Brazil (BRA)	0	0	2	2
Totals (3 entries)		4	4	4	12
