= Gymnastics at the 1967 Summer Universiade =

Gymnastics competition

The gymnastics competitions at the 1967 Summer Universiade were held in Tokyo, Japan.

== Men's events ==
Event	Gold	Silver	Bronze
Individual all-around	Akinori Nakayama (JPN)	Takeshi Katō (JPN)	Sawao Katō (JPN)

== Women's events ==
Event	Gold	Silver	Bronze
Individual all-around	Miyuki Matsuhisa (JPN)	Mitsuko Katori (JPN); Linda Metheny (USA)	
Team all-around	Japan (JPN)	United States (USA)	South Korea (KOR)

=== Medal table ===
Rank	Nation	Gold	Silver	Bronze	Total
1	Japan (JPN)	3	2	0	5
2	United States (USA)	0	2	1	3
3	South Korea (KOR)	0	0	1	1
Totals (3 entries)		3	4	2	9
