= Swimming at the 1961 Summer Universiade =

Swimming at the II Summer Universiade

The swimming competition at the 1961 Summer Universiade took place in Sofia, Bulgaria.

== Men’s events ==
Event	Gold		Silver		Bronze	
100 m freestyle	Keigo Shimizu (JPN)	57.4	Andrzej Salamon (POL)	57.6	Kiyoshi Fukui (JPN)	57.9
400 m freestyle	Tatsuo Fujimoto (JPN)	4:30.9	Murray McLachlan (RSA)	4:32.3	Tomashiro Matsuki (JPN)	4:35.1
1500 m freestyle	Murray McLachlan (RSA)	18:19.8	Tomashiro Matsuki (JPN)	18:21.6	Tatsuo Fujimoto (JPN)	18:23.1
100 m backstroke	Shigeo Fukushima (JPN)	1:05.3	Vsevolod Tarasov (URS)	1:05.8	Vlastimil Kreek (TCH)	1:05.9
200 m breaststroke	Yuriy Funikov (URS)	2:41.4	Yoshiaki Shikiishi (JPN)	2:41.5	Hans-Joachim Tröger (FRG)	2:43.2
200 m butterfly	Haruo Yoshimuta (JPN)	2:20.2	Grigoriy Kiselyov (URS)	2:25.5	Hermann Lotter (FRG)	2:28.8
4 × 100 m freestyle relay	Japan (JPN); Keigo Shimizu(57.9); Kiyoshi Fukui(57.9); Haruo Yoshimuta(56.2); Tatsuo Fujimoto(56.7)	3:48.7	Soviet Union (URS)	3:57.2	Hungary (HUN)	3:58.1
4 × 100 m medley relay	Japan (JPN); Shigeo Fukushima(1:04.4); Yoshiaki Shikiishi(1:13.9); Haruo Yoshimuta(1:11.9); Tatsuo Fujimoto (56.9)	4:17.1	Czechoslovakia (TCH)	4:18.5	Soviet Union (URS)	4:21.4

== Women’s events ==
Event	Gold		Silver		Bronze	
100 m freestyle	Karin Larsson (SWE)	1:07.6	Hilda Zeier (YUG)	1:07.7	Anna Ragasová (TCH)	1:08.1
400 m freestyle	Hilda Zeier (YUG)	5:14.4	Hilda-Danuta Zachariasiewicz (POL)	5:38.0	Ludmila Kottková (TCH)	5:45.1
100 m backstroke	Larisa Viktorova (URS)	1:13.6	Magdolna Dávid (HUN)	1:16.1	Maria Both (ROM)	1:16.7
200 m breaststroke	Sanda Iordan (ROM)	2:59.6	Christine Gosden (GBR)	3:00.8	Alla Kovalenko (URS)	3:01.2
100 m butterfly	Valentina Pozdnyak (URS)	1:13.8	Yelena Antonova (URS); Karin Larsson (SWE)	1:16.0		
4 × 100 m freestyle relay	Soviet Union (URS)	4:39.5	Czechoslovakia (TCH)	4:41.2	Poland (POL)	4:52.2
4 × 100 m medley relay	Soviet Union (URS)	5:04.5	Romania (ROM)	5:12.2	Czechoslovakia (TCH)	5:15.7

== Medal table ==
Rank	Nation	Gold	Silver	Bronze	Total
1	Japan (JPN)	6	2	3	11
2	Soviet Union (URS)	5	4	2	11
3	Romania (ROM)	1	1	1	3
4	South Africa (RSA)	1	1	0	2
4	Sweden (SWE)	1	1	0	2
4	Yugoslavia (YUG)	1	1	0	2
7	Czechoslovakia (TCH)	0	2	4	6
8	Poland (POL)	0	2	1	3
9	Hungary (HUN)	0	1	1	2
10	Great Britain (GBR)	0	1	0	1
11	West Germany (FRG)	0	0	2	2
Totals (11 entries)		15	16	14	45
