= Gymnastics at the 1970 Summer Universiade =

The Gymnastics competitions in the 1970 Summer Universiade were held in Turin, Italy.

== Men's events ==
Event	Gold	Silver	Bronze
Individual all-around	Teruichi Okamura (JPN)	Ryuji Fujimori (JPN)	Vyacheslav Fogel (URS)
Team all-around	Japan (JPN)	Soviet Union (URS)	United States (USA)

== Women's events ==
Event	Gold	Silver	Bronze
Individual all-around	Larisa Petrik (URS)	Tatyana Scegolkova (URS)	Valentina Goloneva (URS)
Team all-around	Soviet Union (URS)	Japan (JPN)	Hungary (HUN)

=== Medal table ===
Rank	Nation	Gold	Silver	Bronze	Total
1	Soviet Union (URS)	2	2	2	6
2	Japan (JPN)	2	2	0	4
3	Hungary (HUN)	0	0	1	1
3	United States (USA)	0	0	1	1
Totals (4 entries)		4	4	4	12
