= Athletics at the 1975 Summer Universiade – Men's high jump =

The men's high jump event at the 1975 Summer Universiade was held at the Stadio Olimpico in Rome on 21 September.

== Results ==
Rank	Athlete	Nationality	Result	Notes
1st place, gold medalist(s)	Enzo Del Forno	Italy	2.13	
2nd place, silver medalist(s)	István Major	Hungary	2.13	
2nd place, silver medalist(s)	Danial Temim	Yugoslavia	2.13	
2nd place, silver medalist(s)	Rick Cuttell	Canada	2.13	
5	Gustavo Marqueta	Spain	2.13	
6	Jacques Aletti	France	2.13	
7	Peicho Zhekov	Bulgaria	2.10	
8	Kazunori Koshikawa	Japan	2.10	
9	Michael Patry	Switzerland	2.10	
10	Bruno Bruni	Italy	2.05	
11	Fidèle Bakamba	Central African Republic	2.00	
12	Hussein Ali Hassan	Iraq	1.90	
13	Said Hossein Ipaktchi	Iran	1.90	
