= Volleyball at the 1970 Summer Universiade =

1970 Universiade volleyball events competition

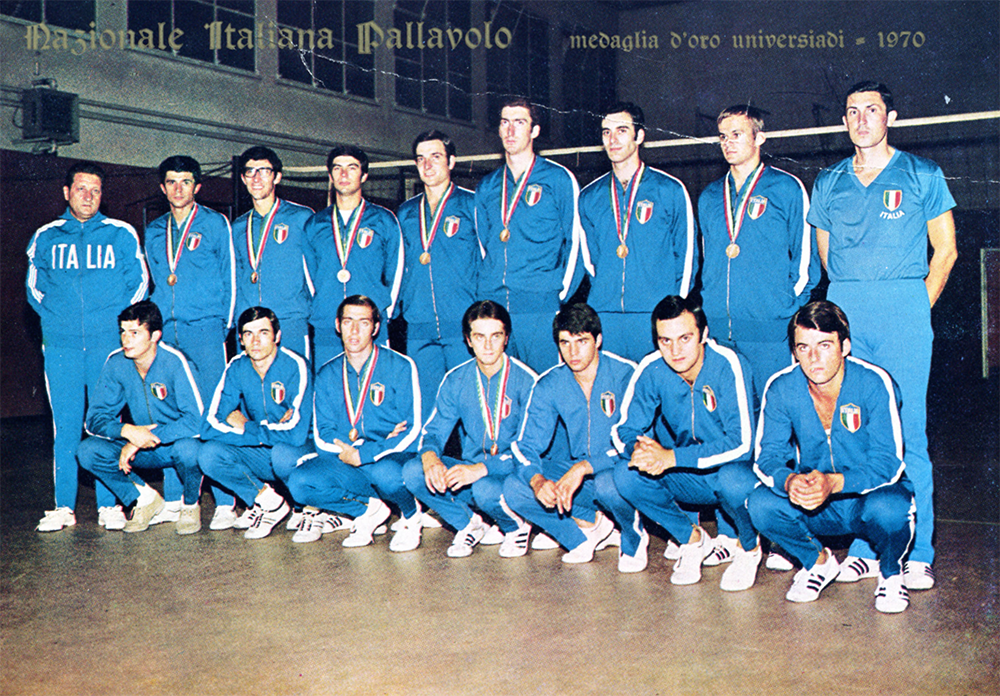
Italy men's national volleyball team

Volleyball events were contested at the 1970 Summer Universiade in Turin, Italy.

Event	Gold	Silver	Bronze
Men's volleyball	Italy (ITA)	Soviet Union (URS)	South Korea (KOR)
Women's volleyball	Soviet Union (URS)	Japan (JPN)	Bulgaria (BUL)
