= Volleyball at the 1997 Summer Universiade =

Volleyball at the XIX Summer Universiade
- Venue: various

Volleyball events were contested at the 1997 Summer Universiade in the island of Sicily, Italy.

Event	Gold	Silver	Bronze
Men's volleyball	South Korea (KOR)	Italy (ITA)	Russia (RUS)
Women's volleyball	Russia (RUS)	United States (USA)	Japan (JPN)
