= Volleyball at the 2001 Summer Universiade =

Volleyball

Volleyball events were contested at the 2001 Summer Universiade in Beijing, People's Republic of China.

Event	Gold	Silver	Bronze
Men's volleyball	United States (USA)	France (FRA)	Russia (RUS)
Women's volleyball	China (CHN)	Russia (RUS)	Thailand (THA)
