= Takayuki Okazaki =

Japanese long jumper (born 1940)

Personal information
- Nationality: Japanese
- Born: 28 March 1940 (age 86) Chiba Prefecture, Japan
- Height: 168 cm (5 ft 6 in)
- Weight: 57 kg (126 lb)

Sport
- Sport: Athletics
- Event: long jump / triple jump
Medal record
Representing Japan
Asian Games
| Gold medal – first place | 1962 Jakarta | Long jump |
| Silver medal – second place | 1962 Jakarta | 4x100m relay |
| Silver medal – second place | 1966 Bangkok | Long jump |
Summer Universiade
| Silver medal – second place | 1961 Sofia | 4x100m relay |
| Silver medal – second place | 1961 Sofia | Long jump |

Takayuki Okazaki (岡崎 高之, Okazaki Takayuki; born 28 March 1940) is a Japanese former long jumper who competed in the 1960 Summer Olympics and in the 1964 Summer Olympics.

Okazaki finished third behind Jorma Valkama in the long jump event at the British 1962 AAA Championships.
