= Gymnastics at the 1987 Summer Universiade =

Gymnastics competition

Gymnastics at the XIV Summer Universiade

The gymnastics competition in the 1987 Summer Universiade were held in Zagreb, Yugoslavia.

== Artistic gymnastics ==
=== Men's events ===
Event	Gold	Silver	Bronze
Team all-around	Soviet Union (URS)	China (CHN)	Japan (JPN)
Rings	Yuri Korolyov; Soviet Union	Li Ning; China	Valentin Mogilny; Soviet Union
Bar	Valentin Mogilny; Soviet Union	Yuri Korolyov; Soviet Union	Csaba Fajkusz; Hungary; Wang Chongsheng; China
Parallel bar	Vladimir Artemov; Soviet Union	Valentin Mogilny; Soviet Union	Li Ning; China
Vault	Lou Yun; China	Yuri Korolyov; Soviet Union	Vladimir Artemov; Soviet Union; Li Ning; China
Floor	Lou Yun; China	Yuri Korolyov; Soviet Union	Li Ning; China
Pommel horse	Valentin Mogilny; Soviet Union	Zsolt Borkai; Hungary	Yuri Korolyov; Soviet Union

=== Women's events ===
Event	Gold	Silver	Bronze
Team all-around	Soviet Union (URS)	Romania (ROU)	China (CHN)
Uneven bars	Yelena Shushunova; Soviet Union	Vera Kolesnikova; Soviet Union	Choi Gyong-hui; North Korea
Vault	Yelena Shushunova; Soviet Union	Ecaterina Szabo; Romania	Melania Rus; Romania
Floor	Yelena Shushunova; Soviet Union	Vera Kolesnikova; Soviet Union	Melania Rus; Romania
Balance beam	Yelena Shushunova; Soviet Union	Ecaterina Szabo; Romania	Yeka Zeturidze; Soviet Union

=== Medal table ===
Rank	Nation	Gold	Silver	Bronze	Total
1	Soviet Union (URS)	10	6	4	20
2	China (CHN)	2	2	5	9
3	Romania (ROU)	0	3	2	5
4	Hungary (HUN)	0	1	1	2
5	Japan (JPN)	0	0	1	1
5	North Korea (PRK)	0	0	1	1
Totals (6 entries)		12	12	14	38

== External sources ==
- Gymnastics results at the Summer Universiade
