= Volleyball at the 1961 Summer Universiade =

Volleyball events were contested at the 1961 Summer Universiade in Sofia, Bulgaria.

Event	Gold	Silver	Bronze
Men's volleyball	Romania (ROM)	Bulgaria (BUL)	Czechoslovakia (TCH)
Women's volleyball	Soviet Union (URS)	Bulgaria (BUL)	Romania (ROM)
