= Athletics at the 1963 Summer Universiade – Men's triple jump =

The men's triple jump event at the 1963 Summer Universiade was held at the Estádio Olímpico Monumental in Porto Alegre on 7 September 1963.

== Results ==
Rank	Athlete	Nationality	Result	Notes
1st place, gold medalist(s)	Satoshi Shimo	Japan	15.99	
2nd place, silver medalist(s)	Aleksandr Zolotarev	Soviet Union	15.94	
3rd place, bronze medalist(s)	Luis Felipe Areta	Spain	15.89	NR
4	Michael Ralph	Great Britain	15.60	
5	Ramón López	Cuba	15.55	
6	Giuseppe Gentile	Italy	15.45	
7	Ryo Kawasaki	Japan	14.50	
8	Silvio Pacheco Rasi	Brazil	14.28	
9	Eloys Giacomelli	Brazil	13.72	
