= Volleyball at the 1991 Summer Universiade =

Volleyball events were contested at the 1991 Summer Universiade in Sheffield, England.

Event	Gold	Silver	Bronze
Men's volleyball	Poland (POL)	China (CHN)	Italy (ITA)
Women's volleyball	Italy (ITA)	Romania (ROM)	United States (USA)
