= Gymnastics at the 1979 Summer Universiade =

1979 gymnastics meet, Mexico

The Gymnastics competitions in the 1979 Summer Universiade were held in Mexico City, Mexico.

== Men's events ==
Event	Gold	Silver	Bronze
Floor	Sergei Khijniakov (URS)	Bohdan Makuts (URS)	Kyogi Yamawaki (JPN)
Pommel Horse	Bohdan Makuts (URS)	Fereno Donath (HUN)	Zoltán Magyar (HUN)
Rings	Alexander Checiches (ROU)	Sergei Khijniakov (URS)	Kyogi Yamawaki (JPN) Fereno Donath (HUN)
Vault	Bohdan Makuts (URS) Kyogi Yamawaki (JPN)		Giorgy Kramaritz (HUN) Kurt Szilier (ROU)
Parallel Bars	Bohdan Makuts (URS)	Peter Kovacs (HUN)	Fedor Kulaksizov (URS) Kurt Szilier (ROU)
Horizontal Bar	Bohdan Makuts (URS)	Sergei Khijniakov (URS)	Junichi Kitagawa (JPN) Hajime Mikami (JPN)
Individual all-around	Bohdan Makuts (URS)	Fedor Kulaksizov (URS)	Sergei Khijniakov (URS)
Team all-around	Soviet Union	Japan	Romania

== Women's events ==
Event	Gold	Silver	Bronze
Vault	Maria Filatova (URS)	Elena Davydova (URS)	Teodora Ungureanu (ROU)
Uneven Bars	Teodora Ungureanu (ROU) Maria Filatova (URS)		Anca Grigoras (ROU)
Beam	Teodora Ungureanu (ROU)	Anca Grigoras (ROU) Svetlana Grozdova (URS)	
Floor	Maria Filatova (URS)	Teodora Ungureanu (ROU)	Elena Davydova (URS)
Individual all-around	Teodora Ungureanu (ROU)	Maria Filatova (URS)	Elena Davydova (URS)
Team all-around	Soviet Union	Romania	United States

== Medal table ==
Rank	Nation	Gold	Silver	Bronze	Total
1	Soviet Union (URS)	11	7	4	22
2	Romania (ROU)	4	3	5	12
3	Japan (JPN)	1	1	4	6
4	Hungary (HUN)	0	2	3	5
5	United States (USA)	0	0	1	1
Totals (5 entries)		16	13	17	46
