= Diving at the 1961 Summer Universiade =

The diving competition in the 1961 Summer Universiade was held in Sofia, Bulgaria.

== Medal overview ==
Event	Gold	Silver	Bronze
Men's 3-Meter Springboard	Shunsuke Kaneto (JPN)	Len Rapkins (GBR)	Gheorghe Banu (ROM)
Men's Platform	Tadao Tosa (JPN)	Horst Rosenfeld (FRG)	Gheorghe Banu (ROM)
Women's 3-Meter Springboard	Liz Ferris (GBR)	Helga Berg (FRG)	Konstantina Popova (BUL)
Women's Platform	Liz Ferris (GBR)	Irmgard Lurf (AUT)	Emilia Negulescu (ROM)

== Medal table ==
* Host nation (Bulgaria)

Rank	Nation	Gold	Silver	Bronze	Total
1	Great Britain (GBR)	2	1	0	3
2	Japan (JPN)	2	0	0	2
3	West Germany (FRG)	0	2	0	2
4	Austria (AUT)	0	1	0	1
5	Romania (ROM)	0	0	3	3
6	Bulgaria (BUL)	0	0	1	1
Totals (6 entries)		4	4	4	12
