= Volleyball at the 1993 Summer Universiade =

Volleyball at the XVII Summer Universiade
- Venue: various

Volleyball events were contested at the 1993 Summer Universiade in Buffalo, New York, USA.

Event	Gold	Silver	Bronze
Men's	Japan (JPN)	Poland (POL)	South Korea (KOR)
Women's	Romania (ROM)	United States (USA)	Switzerland (SUI)

== Bibliography ==
- Results of The 17th Universiade '93 Buffalo: Volleyball (universiade.fjct.fit.ac.jp)
