= Volleyball at the 1987 Summer Universiade =

Volleyball events were contested at the 1987 Summer Universiade in Zagreb, Yugoslavia.

Event	Gold	Silver	Bronze
Men's volleyball	Yugoslavia (YUG)	China (CHN)	Italy (ITA)
Women's volleyball	China (CHN)	Soviet Union (URS)	East Germany (GDR)
