= Gymnastics at the 1963 Summer Universiade =

The Gymnastics competitions in the 1963 Summer Universiade were held in Porto Alegre, Brazil.

== Men's events ==
| Event | Gold | Silver | Bronze |
|---|---|---|---|
| Individual all-around | Masatake Matsumoto (JPN) | Takeshi Katō (JPN) | Takuji Hayata (JPN) |
| Team all-around | Japan (JPN) | Soviet Union (URS) | West Germany (FRG) |

== Women's events ==
| Event | Gold | Silver | Bronze |
|---|---|---|---|
| Individual all-around | Larisa Latynina (URS); Katalin Makray (HUN) | not awarded | Zolan Hidegkuti (HUN) |
| Team all-around | Hungary (HUN) | Soviet Union (URS) | Cuba (CUB) |

=== Medal table ===
| Rank | Nation | Gold | Silver | Bronze | Total |
|---|---|---|---|---|---|
| 1 | Japan (JPN) | 2 | 1 | 1 | 4 |
| 2 | Hungary (HUN) | 2 | 0 | 1 | 3 |
| 3 | Soviet Union (URS) | 1 | 2 | 0 | 3 |
| 4 | Cuba (CUB) | 0 | 0 | 1 | 1 |
| 4 | West Germany (FRG) | 0 | 0 | 1 | 1 |
| Totals (5 entries) | | 5 | 3 | 4 | 12 |
