= Volleyball at the 1979 Summer Universiade =

Volleyball events were contested at the 1979 Summer Universiade in Mexico City, Mexico.

Event	Gold	Silver	Bronze
Men's volleyball	South Korea (KOR)	Cuba (CUB)	Japan (JPN)
Women's volleyball	Soviet Union (URS)	Japan (JPN)	Cuba (CUB)
