= Volleyball at the 1967 Summer Universiade =

Volleyball events were contested at the 1967 Summer Universiade in Tokyo, Japan.

Event	Gold	Silver	Bronze
Men's volleyball	Japan (JPN)	South Korea (KOR)	France (FRA)
Women's volleyball	Japan (JPN)	Philippines (PHI)	Hong Kong (HKG)
