= 1987 Summer Universiade =

Multi-sport event in Zagreb, Croatia

XIV Summer Universiade XIV. Ljetna univerzijada
- Slogan : World of the young for a World of peace!
- Host city: Zagreb, Yugoslavia
- Nations: 122
- Athletes: 6,423
- Events: 120 in 12 sports
- Opening: July 8, 1987
- Closing: July 19, 1987
- Opened by: Lazar Mojsov, president of the Presidency of the SFRY
- Athlete's Oath: Ivan Karpović (football)
- Judge's Oath: Janka Dorožić (athletics)
- Torch lighter: Dražen Petrović, basketball player
- Main venue: Maksimir Stadium

The 1987 Summer Universiade, also known as the XIV Summer Universiade, took place in Zagreb, SR Croatia, SFR Yugoslavia. It involved participants from 111 countries and over 6,000 individual sportspersons and members from delegations.

== Infrastructural changes ==
The City of Zagreb used the event to renovate and revitalize the city. The city's main square (Republic Square) was repaved with stone blocks and made part of the downtown pedestrian zone. A part of the Medveščak stream, which had been running under the sewers since 1898, was uncovered by workers. This part formed the Manduševac fountain that was also covered in 1898. Multi-sport venue ŠRC Jarun on the Jarun Lake was built for the event.

== Mascot ==
The mascot of the 1987 Summer Universiade is a squirrel, named "Zagi" and created by Nedeljko Dragić. It was described as:

It is a resident of Zagreb's parks, amiable and always in a good mood. Its nonchalance and gaiety are but a cover for diligence. Always on the move and reaching for the seemingly impossible, the squirrel embodies the dynamism of athletic endeavour. Its origin is shown by the little black hat, characteristic of the folk costumes in the region of Zagreb.

Zagi, the XIV Summer Universiade mascot, was created by Croatian animator Nedeljko Dragić.

== Sports ==
- Athletics (42)
- Basketball (2)
- Canoeing (13)
- Diving (6)
- Fencing (8)
- Football (1)
- Gymnastics (14)
- Rowing (14)
- Swimming (32)
- Tennis (5)
- Volleyball (2)
- Water polo (1)

== Medal table ==
* Host nation (Yugoslavia)

Rank	Nation	Gold	Silver	Bronze	Total
1	United States (USA)	25	19	25	69
2	Soviet Union (URS)	23	34	19	76
3	Romania (ROU)	21	13	9	43
4	Italy (ITA)	12	8	10	30
5	China (CHN)	11	8	11	30
6	Yugoslavia (YUG)*	7	7	8	22
7	East Germany (GDR)	6	4	5	15
8	Hungary (HUN)	4	3	5	12
9	Great Britain (GBR)	4	1	4	9
10	Netherlands (NED)	3	8	8	19
11	West Germany (FRG)	3	5	5	13
12	Bulgaria (BUL)	3	4	1	8
13	Japan (JPN)	3	3	6	12
14	Poland (POL)	3	1	2	6
15	Cuba (CUB)	2	3	3	8
16	Czechoslovakia (TCH)	1	2	2	5
17	Greece (GRE)	1	2	1	4
18	Belgium (BEL)	1	1	1	3
19	Australia (AUS)	1	1	0	2
19	New Zealand (NZL)	1	1	0	2
21	Spain (ESP)	1	0	1	2
22	Morocco (MAR)	1	0	0	1
22	Norway (NOR)	1	0	0	1
22	Portugal (POR)	1	0	0	1
25	France (FRA)	0	3	4	7
26	Nigeria (NGR)	0	3	3	6
27	Canada (CAN)	0	2	5	7
28	South Korea (KOR)	0	1	2	3
29	Brazil (BRA)	0	1	0	1
29	Senegal (SEN)	0	1	0	1
29	Switzerland (SUI)	0	1	0	1
32	North Korea (PRK)	0	0	2	2
33	Jamaica (JAM)	0	0	1	1
33	Mexico (MEX)	0	0	1	1
33	Puerto Rico (PUR)	0	0	1	1
Totals (35 entries)		139	140	145	424

== See also ==
- European Universities Games 2016
- European University Sports Association
- FISU
