= Volleyball at the 1977 Summer Universiade =

Volleyball events were contested at the 1977 Summer Universiade in Sofia, Bulgaria.

== Men's tournament ==
=== First Round ===
Group	A	B	C	D	E	F
Teams	Bulgaria Mexico Egypt Belgium	Soviet Union Brazil Turkey Kuwait	Cuba Italy Netherlands Sudan	Yugoslavia Japan Canada Algeria	United States Czechoslovakia Lebanon Greece	South Korea Romania Tunisia

Top two teams from Groups A, C, and E advance to Group G of the second round, and top two teams from Groups B, D, and F advance to Group H of the second round.

=== Second Round ===
Group	G	H
Teams	Bulgaria Czechoslovakia Cuba Italy Mexico United States	South Korea Soviet Union Japan Brazil Yugoslavia Romania

Top two teams from each group advance to the semifinals.

=== Knockout stages ===
==== Medal Semifinals ====
- Czechoslovakia 3-1 Soviet Union
- Bulgaria 3-1 South Korea

==== 5-8th Classification ====
- Romania 3-0 United States
- Cuba 3-1 Yugoslavia

==== 9-12th Classification ====
- Japan 3-2 Italy
- Brazil 3-0 Mexico

==== 11th-place match ====
Brazil 3-? Mexico

==== 9th-place match ====
Japan 3-? Italy

==== 7th-place match ====
Yugoslavia 3-2 United States

==== 5th-place match ====
Romania 3-1 Cuba

==== 3rd Place Match ====
South Korea 3-2 Soviet Union

==== Final ====
Bulgaria 3-1 Czechoslovakia

== Medal table ==
Event	Gold	Silver	Bronze
Men's volleyball	Bulgaria (BUL)	Czechoslovakia (TCH)	South Korea (KOR)
Women's volleyball	Soviet Union (URS)	Cuba (CUB)	Bulgaria (BUL)
