= Volleyball at the 1965 Summer Universiade =

Volleyball events were contested at the 1965 Summer Universiade in Budapest, Hungary.

Event	Gold	Silver	Bronze
Men's volleyball	Soviet Union (URS)	Hungary (HUN)	Yugoslavia (YUG)
Women's volleyball	Soviet Union (URS)	Bulgaria (BUL)	Romania (ROU)
