= 1977 Summer Universiade =

Multi-sport event in Sofia, Bulgaria

IX Summer Universiade IX Лятна универсиада
- Host city: Sofia, Bulgaria
- Nations: 78
- Athletes: 2,939
- Events: 102 in 10 sports
- Opening: August 17, 1977
- Closing: August 28, 1977
- Opened by: Todor Zhivkov
- Torch lighter: Nikolay Georgiev
- Main venue: Vassil Levski Stadion

The 1977 Summer Universiade, also known as the IX Summer Universiade or World University Games, took place in Sofia, Bulgaria.

== Sports ==
- Athletics (34)
- Basketball (2)
- Diving (4)
- Fencing (8)
- Gymnastics (4)
- Swimming (22)
- Tennis (5)
- Volleyball (2)
- Water polo (1)
- Wrestling (20)

== Participating NUSFs ==
The following 78 National University Sporting Federations sent delegations to the 1977 Summer Universiade.12 delegations were composed exclusively of male athletes (Algeria, Central African Republic, Congo, Ethiopia, Gambia, Madagascar, Sudan, Tunisia, Zambia, Barbados, Panama, Paraguay, Uruguay, North Korea,Jordan and Kuwait).The three all-female delegation was Guinea's, with just one woman and Peru with the woman's volleyball team.

Participating National University Sports Federations
1. Algeria (23)
2. Argentina (6)
3. Australia (18)
4. Austria (19)
5. Bangladesh (2)
6. Barbados (2)
7. Belgium (29)
8. Brazil (54)
9. Bulgaria (206)
10. Central African Republic (11)
11. Canada (98)
12. Republic of the Congo (12)
13. China (62)
14. Cuba (81)
15. Colombia (4)
16. Czechoslovakia (94)
17. Denmark (14)
18. Dominican Republic (2)
19. East Germany (48)
20. Egypt (15)
21. Ethiopia (5)
22. Finland (24)
23. France (91)
24. The Gambia (1)
25. Guinea (1)
26. Greece (22)
27. Great Britain (84)
28. Hungary (87)
29. Iceland (3)
30. Israel (16)
31. Indonesia (6)
32. India (11)
33. Iran (28)
34. Iraq (14)
35. Italy (112)
36. Jamaica (3)
37. Japan (119)
38. Jordan (1)
39. Kenya (8)
40. South Korea (34)
41. Kuwait (12)
42. Lebanon (4)
43. Liechtenstein (1)
44. Luxembourg (3)
45. Madagascar (2)
46. Malta (2)
47. Mongolia (14)
48. Mexico (12)
49. Netherlands (39)
50. New Zealand (2)
51. Nigeria (19)
52. Norway (11)
53. North Korea (21)
54. Panama (2)
55. Pakistan (4)
56. Paraguay (1)
57. Peru (12)
58. Puerto Rico (5)
59. Philippines (3)
60. Poland (121)
61. Romania (143)
62. Senegal (4)
63. Soviet Union (184)
64. Spain (41)
65. Sudan (11)
66. Sri Lanka (2)
67. Sweden (44)
68. Switzerland (31)
69. Syria (11)
70. Trinidad and Tobago (2)
71. Tunisia (8)
72. Turkey (38)
73. Uruguay (5)
74. United States (195)
75. Venezuela (2)
76. West Germany (117)
77. Yugoslavia (46)
78. Zambia (6)

== Medal table ==
* Host nation (Bulgaria)

| Rank | Nation | Gold | Silver | Bronze | Total |
|---|---|---|---|---|---|
| 1 | Soviet Union (URS) | 26 | 31 | 25 | 82 |
| 2 | United States (USA) | 19 | 11 | 14 | 44 |
| 3 | Bulgaria (BUL)* | 16 | 8 | 11 | 35 |
| 4 | Romania (ROM) | 9 | 8 | 11 | 28 |
| 5 | Japan (JPN) | 5 | 5 | 1 | 11 |
| 6 | Czechoslovakia (TCH) | 5 | 4 | 1 | 10 |
| 7 | Canada (CAN) | 4 | 6 | 5 | 15 |
| 8 | Cuba (CUB) | 4 | 3 | 4 | 11 |
| 9 | Poland (POL) | 3 | 6 | 4 | 13 |
| 10 | West Germany (FRG) | 3 | 3 | 6 | 12 |
| 11 | Hungary (HUN) | 2 | 4 | 4 | 10 |
| 12 | France (FRA) | 2 | 2 | 2 | 6 |
| 13 | Italy (ITA) | 1 | 3 | 3 | 7 |
| 14 | Yugoslavia (YUG) | 1 | 3 | 1 | 5 |
| 15 | Mongolia (MGL) | 1 | 0 | 2 | 3 |
| 16 | Austria (AUT) | 1 | 0 | 0 | 1 |
| 16 | Belgium (BEL) | 1 | 0 | 0 | 1 |
| 16 | Brazil (BRA) | 1 | 0 | 0 | 1 |
| 19 | Great Britain (GBR) | 0 | 4 | 1 | 5 |
| 20 | East Germany (GDR) | 0 | 3 | 3 | 6 |
| 21 | Algeria (ALG) | 0 | 0 | 1 | 1 |
| 21 | China (CHN) | 0 | 0 | 1 | 1 |
| 21 | Iran (IRI) | 0 | 0 | 1 | 1 |
| 21 | South Korea (KOR) | 0 | 0 | 1 | 1 |
| 21 | Switzerland (SUI) | 0 | 0 | 1 | 1 |
| 21 | Turkey (TUR) | 0 | 0 | 1 | 1 |
| Totals (26 entries) | | 104 | 104 | 104 | 312 |
