= 1983 Summer Universiade =

Multi-sport event in Edmonton, Canada

XII Summer Universiade XII Universiade d'été
- Host city: Edmonton, Canada
- Nations: 73
- Athletes: 2,400
- Events: 117 in 10 sports
- Opening: July 1, 1983
- Closing: July 12, 1983
- Opened by: Charles, Prince of Wales
- Torch lighter: Jeanna Suzanne-Genrisson
- Main venue: Commonwealth Stadium

The 1983 Summer Universiade, also known as the XII Summer Universiade, took place in Edmonton, Alberta, Canada between July 1 and 12, 1983. Over 2,400 athletes from 73 countries participated. It was the first ever Summer Universiade held in North America; as of 2026, it remains the only time Canada hosted the Summer, or Winter, Universiade (renamed Summer, or Winter, World University Games in 2021). Previously, Edmonton hosted the 1978 Commonwealth Games, and later hosted the 2001 World Championships in Athletics, amongst other international sporting events.

The official mascot of the event was Wugie the Owl; his name is an acronym of World University Games in Edmonton, and the Owl is the provincial bird of Alberta. The Prince of Wales (now Charles III) opened the Universiade accompanied by Diana, Princess of Wales, and other dignitaries and celebrities also visited the event.

The event was marred by tragedy from the death of Soviet diver Sergei Chalibashvili when he died eight days after hitting his head on the 10 m diving platform in competition while attempting a reverse 3½ in the tuck position.

In October 2005, Edmonton was selected as a potential bid candidate to host the 2011 Summer Universiade by the Canadian Interuniversity Sport (CIS).

== Sports ==
Various competitions were held, across 10 different sports:

- Athletics (40)
- Basketball (2)
- Cycling
  - Road cycling (4)
  - Track cycling (8)
- Diving (4)
- Fencing (8)
- Gymnastics (14)
- Swimming (30)
- Tennis (5)
- Volleyball (2)
- Water polo (1)

== Venues ==
Venue	Events	Capacity	Status
Argyll Velodrome	Track Cycling		Active
Commonwealth Stadium	Athletics	60,081	Active
Hawrelak Park	Road cycling	Start/finish	Active
Kinsmen Aquatic Centre	Diving, Swimming, Water polo		Active
Michener Park	Tennis		Defunct
Northlands Coliseum	Gymnastics	17,498	Defunct
Universiade Pavilion	Basketball, Volleyball	5,500	Active

== Medal table ==
* Host nation (Canada)

Rank	Nation	Gold	Silver	Bronze	Total
1	Soviet Union (URS)	57	30	25	112
2	United States (USA)	12	20	21	53
3	Canada (CAN)*	9	11	18	38
4	Italy (ITA)	8	11	6	25
5	Romania (ROU)	6	12	8	26
6	China (CHN)	5	5	4	14
7	Nigeria (NGR)	5	0	0	5
8	Great Britain (GBR)	3	2	3	8
9	France (FRA)	2	4	5	11
10	Japan (JPN)	2	3	5	10
11	Cuba (CUB)	2	1	4	7
12	Australia (AUS)	2	1	2	5
13	West Germany (FRG)	1	6	3	10
14	Poland (POL)	1	2	1	4
15	Belgium (BEL)	1	1	0	2
16	Brazil (BRA)	1	0	2	3
17	Netherlands (NED)	0	3	0	3
18	Yugoslavia (YUG)	0	2	1	3
19	Tunisia (TUN)	0	1	2	3
20	Czechoslovakia (TCH)	0	1	0	1
20	Senegal (SEN)	0	1	0	1
20	Tanzania (TAN)	0	1	0	1
23	Austria (AUT)	0	0	1	1
23	Bermuda (BER)	0	0	1	1
23	Hungary (HUN)	0	0	1	1
23	Jamaica (JAM)	0	0	1	1
23	New Zealand (NZL)	0	0	1	1
23	South Korea (KOR)	0	0	1	1
Totals (28 entries)		117	118	116	351

== Participating nations ==
Around 2,400 athletes from 73 nations, competed at the 1983 Summer Universiade.

Participating National University Sports Federations

Afghanistan Albania Algeria Andorra Angola Argentina Australia Austria Barbados Belgium Benin Bolivia Botswana Brazil Bulgaria Myanmar Cameroon Canada Chad Chile China Colombia Comoros Republic of the Congo Cuba Cyprus Czechoslovakia Denmark Dominican Republic Ecuador Egypt Ethiopia Finland France Gabon The Gambia East Germany West Germany Ghana Greece Guatemala Haiti Honduras Hong Kong Hungary Iceland India Indonesia Iran Iraq Ireland Israel Italy Ivory Coast Jamaica Japan Jordan Kenya South Korea North Korea Laos Lebanon Lesotho Libya Liechtenstein Luxembourg Mali Malta Mauritania Mexico Monaco Mongolia Morocco Nepal Netherlands New Zealand Nicaragua Niger Nigeria Norway Oman Pakistan Panama Papua New Guinea Peru Paraguay Philippines Poland Portugal Puerto Rico Qatar Romania Rwanda Saint Kitts and Nevis Saint Lucia Saint Vincent and the Grenadines San Marino Saudi Arabia Senegal Seychelles Sierra Leone Singapore Soviet Union Spain Sudan Sweden Switzerland Syria Chinese Taipei Tanzania Thailand Togo Tonga Trinidad and Tobago Tunisia Turkey Uganda United Arab Emirates Great Britain United States Upper Volta Uruguay Venezuela Vietnam Western Samoa North Yemen South Yemen Yugoslavia Zaire Zambia
