= 1963 Summer Universiade =

Multi-sport event in Porto Alegre, Brazil

III Summer Universiade III Universíade de Verão
- Host city: Porto Alegre, Brazil
- Nations: 27
- Athletes: 713
- Events: 69 in 9 sports
- Opening: August 31, 1963
- Closing: September 8, 1963
- Opened by: Paulo de Tarso Santos
- Athlete's Oath: Antônio Salvador Sucar (basketball)
- Torch lighter: Adhemar Ferreira da Silva (athletics)
- Main venue: Estádio Olímpico Monumental

The 1963 Summer Universiade, also known as the III Summer Universiade, took place in Porto Alegre, Brazil.

== Sports ==
- Aquatics
  - Diving (4)
  - Swimming (15)
  - Water polo (1)
- Athletics (29)
- Basketball (1)
- Fencing (8)
- Gymnastics (4)
- Tennis (5)
- Volleyball (2)

== Schedule ==
OC	Opening ceremony	●	Event competitions	1	Event finals	CC	Closing ceremony

August/September 1963		August		September							
August/September 1963		30 Fri	31 Sat	1 Sun	2 Mon	3 Tue	4 Wed	5 Thu	6 Fri	7 Sat	8 Sun
Ceremonies			OC								CC
Aquatics
Aquatics	Diving			●	●	●	●				
Aquatics	Swimming			●	●	●	●				
Aquatics	Water polo			●	●	●	●	●	●		
Athletics								●	●	●	●
Basketball		●	●	●	●	●	●	●	●	●	●
Fencing		●		●	●	●	●	●	●	●	●
Gymnastics				●	●						
Tennis			●	●	●	●	●	●	●	●	
Volleyball			●	●	●	●	●	●	●	●	

== Medal table ==
* Host nation (Brazil)

Rank	Nation	Gold	Silver	Bronze	Total
1	Hungary (HUN)	19	13	6	38
2	Soviet Union (URS)	18	12	3	33
3	West Germany (FRG)	10	11	14	35
4	Japan (JPN)	9	4	6	19
5	Great Britain (GBR)	4	6	3	13
6	Italy (ITA)	3	5	10	18
7	Poland (POL)	2	1	0	3
8	Brazil (BRA)*	2	0	9	11
9	France (FRA)	1	6	3	10
10	Cuba (CUB)	1	3	5	9
11	Czechoslovakia (TCH)	1	1	0	2
12	Peru (PER)	0	1	2	3
12	Spain (ESP)	0	1	2	3
14	Netherlands (NED)	0	1	1	2
14	South Africa (SAF)	0	1	1	2
16	Switzerland (SUI)	0	1	0	1
16	Uruguay (URU)	0	1	0	1
18	Belgium (BEL)	0	0	1	1
18	Chile (CHI)	0	0	1	1
18	Luxembourg (LUX)	0	0	1	1
18	Yugoslavia (YUG)	0	0	1	1
Totals (21 entries)		70	68	69	207
