= 1961 Summer Universiade =

Multi-sport event in Sofia, Bulgaria

II Summer Universiade II Лятна универсиада
- Host city: Sofia, Bulgaria
- Nations: 33
- Athletes: 1,627
- Events: 68 in 9 sports
- Opening: August 25, 1961
- Closing: September 3, 1961
- Opened by: Dimitar Ganev
- Main venue: Vasil Levski Stadium

The 1961 Summer Universiade, also known as the II Summer Universiade, was an international sporting event for university students that took place in Sofia, Bulgaria. Held from 25 August to 3 September, the event featured nine different sports, with participation by 1,627 athletes from 33 countries.

== Sports at the 1961 Summer Universiade ==
- Athletics (29)
- Basketball (2)
- Diving (4)
- Fencing (8)
- Gymnastics (4)
- Swimming (15)
- Tennis (5)
- Volleyball (2)
- Water polo (1)

== Medal table ==
* Host nation (Bulgaria)

Rank	Nation	Gold	Silver	Bronze	Total
1	Soviet Union (URS)	21	23	7	51
2	Japan (JPN)	9	5	4	18
3	Hungary (HUN)	8	2	8	18
4	Romania (ROU)	6	6	9	21
5	Yugoslavia (YUG)	4	2	0	6
6	Czechoslovakia (TCH)	3	6	8	17
7	West Germany (FRG)	3	4	12	19
8	Poland (POL)	3	4	4	11
9	Italy (ITA)	3	0	2	5
10	Bulgaria (BUL)*	2	5	7	14
11	Great Britain (GBR)	2	5	4	11
12	South Africa (SAF)	1	1	0	2
12	Sweden (SWE)	1	1	0	2
14	Ireland (IRL)	1	0	1	2
15	Cuba (CUB)	1	0	0	1
16	Austria (AUT)	0	2	1	3
17	Switzerland (SUI)	0	2	0	2
18	Belgium (BEL)	0	1	0	1
Totals (18 entries)		68	69	67	204
