= List of Asian Games medalists in gymnastics =

This is the complete list of Asian Games medalists in gymnastics from 1974 to 2022.

== Men's artistic ==
=== Team ===
Games	Gold	Silver	Bronze
1974 Tehran	China (CHN); Cai Huanzong; Liao Runtian; Pan Chenfei; Wu Shoude; Yang Mingming; Zhao Jiawei	Japan (JPN); Kazuo Horide; Kenji Igarashi; Takeo Igarashi; Ryuji Nakayama; Hideyuki Nozawa; Hiroshi Sugawara	North Korea (PRK); Kim Song-il; Kim Song-jin; Song Sun-bong
1978 Bangkok	China (CHN); Cai Huanzong; Huang Yubin; Li Yuejiu; Pan Chenfei; Peng Yaping; Xiong Songliang	Japan (JPN); Nobuyuki Kajitani; Junichi Kitagawa; Toshiomi Nishikii; Teruichi Okamura; Shinzo Shiraishi; Haruyasu Taguchi	South Korea (KOR); Cho Tai-ho; Kim Hwi-chul; Kwon Oh-suk; Lee Dae-haeng; Lee Young-taik; Shin Jong-soon
1982 New Delhi	China (CHN); Huang Yubin; Li Ning; Li Xiaoping; Li Yuejiu; Lou Yun; Tong Fei	Japan (JPN); Koji Gushiken; Noritoshi Hirata; Nobuyuki Kajitani; Shinji Morisue; Taichi Okada; Koji Sotomura	North Korea (PRK); Han Gwang-song; Ri Chol-hon; Ri Gil-su; Ri Gun-sun; Ri Su-gil; Sin Gwi-dok
1986 Seoul	China (CHN); Guo Linsheng; Li Ning; Lou Yun; Wang Chongsheng; Xu Zhiqiang; Yang Yueshan	South Korea (KOR); Han Chung-sik; Joo Young-sam; Kwon Soon-seong; Lee Jeong-sik; Park Jong-hoon; Yoon Chang-seon	Japan (JPN); Yukihiro Hayase; Hiroyuki Konishi; Koichi Mizushima; Hiroaki Okabe; Koji Sotomura; Kyoji Yamawaki
1990 Beijing	China (CHN); Guo Linyao; Li Chunyang; Li Ge; Li Jing; Li Xiaoshuang; Qiao Liang	Japan (JPN); Yutaka Aihara; Yoshiaki Hatakeda; Yukio Iketani; Masayuki Matsunaga; Daisuke Nishikawa; Toshiharu Sato	South Korea (KOR); Jung Jin-soo; Kang Boung-eui; Kim Jong-soo; Lee Joo-hyung; Yoo Ok-ryul; Yoon Chang-seon
1994 Hiroshima	China (CHN); Fan Hongbin; Guo Linyao; Huang Huadong; Huang Liping; Li Dashuang; Li Jing; Li Xiaoshuang	South Korea (KOR); Han Kwang-ho; Han Yoon-soo; Jung Jin-soo; Lee Jang-hyung; Lee Joo-hyung; Yeo Hong-chul; Yoo Ok-ryul	Japan (JPN); Takashi Chinen; Yoshiaki Hatakeda; Horimasa Masuda; Masayuki Matsunaga; Daisuke Nishikawa; Toshiharu Sato; Hikaru Tanaka
1998 Bangkok	China (CHN); Huang Xu; Li Xiaopeng; Xing Aowei; Yang Wei; Zhang Jinjing; Zhao Sheng	South Korea (KOR); Cho Seong-min; Kim Dong-hwa; Lee Jang-hyung; Lee Joo-hyung; Yeo Hong-chul; You Won-kil	Japan (JPN); Mutsumi Harada; Akihiro Kasamatsu; Yasuhiro Ogawa; Yoshihiro Saito; Naoya Tsukahara; Isao Yoneda
2002 Busan	China (CHN); Feng Jing; Huang Xu; Li Xiaopeng; Liang Fuliang; Teng Haibin; Yang Wei	South Korea (KOR); Kim Dae-eun; Kim Dong-hwa; Kim Seung-il; Lee Sun-sung; Yang Tae-seok; Yang Tae-young	Japan (JPN); Mutsumi Harada; Takehiro Kashima; Hisashi Mizutori; Yasuhiro Ogawa; Hiroyuki Tomita; Naoya Tsukahara
2006 Doha	China (CHN); Chen Yibing; Feng Jing; Liang Fuliang; Xiao Qin; Yang Wei; Zou Kai	Japan (JPN); Ryosuke Baba; Kenya Kobayashi; Shun Kuwahara; Hisashi Mizutori; Hiroyuki Tomita; Yuki Yoshimura	South Korea (KOR); Kim Dae-eun; Kim Ji-hoon; Kim Seung-il; Kim Soo-myun; Yang Tae-young; Yoo Won-chul
2010 Guangzhou	China (CHN); Chen Yibing; Feng Zhe; Lü Bo; Teng Haibin; Yan Mingyong; Zhang Chenglong	Japan (JPN); Ryosuke Baba; Ryotaka Deguchi; Shun Kuwahara; Hisashi Mizutori; Takuya Nakase; Kyoichi Watanabe	South Korea (KOR); Kim Hee-hoon; Kim Ji-hoon; Kim Soo-myun; Sin Seob; Yang Hak-seon; Yoo Won-chul
2014 Incheon	Japan (JPN); Tomomasa Hasegawa; Yuya Kamoto; Yusuke Saito; Shotaro Shirai; Kazuyuki Takeda; Masayoshi Yamamoto	South Korea (KOR); Kim Hee-hoon; Lee Hyeok-jung; Lee Sang-wook; Park Min-soo; Shin Dong-hyen; Yang Hak-seon	China (CHN); Huang Xi; Huang Yuguo; Liao Junlin; Wang Peng; Yang Shengchao; Zou Kai
2018 Jakarta–Palembang	China (CHN); Deng Shudi; Lin Chaopan; Sun Wei; Xiao Ruoteng; Zou Jingyuan	Japan (JPN); Kenta Chiba; Tomomasa Hasegawa; Fuya Maeno; Shogo Nonomura; Kakeru Tanigawa	South Korea (KOR); Kim Han-sol; Lee Hyeok-jung; Lee Jae-seong; Lee Jun-ho; Park Min-soo
2022 Hangzhou	China (CHN); Lan Xingyu; Lin Chaopan; Xiao Ruoteng; Zhang Boheng; Zou Jingyuan	Japan (JPN); Shohei Kawakami; Takeru Kitazono; Kakeru Tanigawa; Wataru Tanigawa; Ryota Tsumura	Chinese Taipei (TPE); Huang Yen-chang; Lee Chih-kai; Lin Guan-yi; Shiao Yu-jan; Yeh Cheng
2026 Aichi-Nagoya	China (CHN); Lan Xingyu; Zou Jingyuan; Sun Wei; Tian Hao; Zhang Boheng	Japan (JPN); Tomoharu Tsunogai; Shoma Tsukiyama; Kiichi Kaneta; Shinnosuke Oka; Daiki Hashimoto	Chinese Taipei (TPE); Tang Chia-hung; Hung Yuan-hsi; Chuang Chia-lung; Lee Chih-kai; Shiao Yu-jan

=== Individual all-around ===
Games	Gold	Silver	Bronze
1974 Tehran	Kazuo Horide (JPN)	Cai Huanzong (CHN)	Lee Young-taik (KOR)
1978 Bangkok	Cai Huanzong (CHN)	Xiong Songliang (CHN)	Li Yuejiu (CHN)
1982 New Delhi	Li Ning (CHN)	Tong Fei (CHN)	Ri Chol-hon (PRK)
1986 Seoul	Li Ning (CHN)	Yang Yueshan (CHN)	Lou Yun (CHN)
1990 Beijing	Li Jing (CHN)	Guo Linyao (CHN)	Li Xiaoshuang (CHN)
1994 Hiroshima	Li Xiaoshuang (CHN)	Huang Liping (CHN)	Yoshiaki Hatakeda (JPN)
1998 Bangkok	Huang Xu (CHN)	Yang Wei (CHN)	Naoya Tsukahara (JPN)
2002 Busan	Yang Wei (CHN)	Liang Fuliang (CHN)	Shared silver
2002 Busan	Yang Wei (CHN)	Kim Dong-hwa (KOR)	Shared silver
2006 Doha	Yang Wei (CHN)	Hisashi Mizutori (JPN)	Hiroyuki Tomita (JPN)
2010 Guangzhou	Teng Haibin (CHN)	Lü Bo (CHN)	Hisashi Mizutori (JPN)
2014 Incheon	Yuya Kamoto (JPN)	Masayoshi Yamamoto (JPN)	Lee Sang-wook (KOR)
2018 Jakarta–Palembang	Lin Chaopan (CHN)	Shogo Nonomura (JPN)	Xiao Ruoteng (CHN)
2022 Hangzhou	Zhang Boheng (CHN)	Takeru Kitazono (JPN)	Lan Xingyu (CHN)
2026 Aichi-Nagoya	Zhang Boheng (CHN)	Shinnosuke Oka (JPN)	Daiki Hashimoto (JPN)

=== Floor ===
Games	Gold	Silver	Bronze
1974 Tehran	Kazuo Horide (JPN)	Song Sun-bong (PRK)	Kim Song-il (PRK)
1978 Bangkok	Li Yuejiu (CHN)	Peng Yaping (CHN)	Kim Hwi-chul (KOR)
1982 New Delhi	Tong Fei (CHN)	Li Yuejiu (CHN)	Shared silver
1982 New Delhi	Tong Fei (CHN)	Ri Chol-hon (PRK)	Shared silver
1986 Seoul	Li Ning (CHN)	Yang Yueshan (CHN)	Park Jong-hoon (KOR)
1990 Beijing	Li Xiaoshuang (CHN)	Li Chunyang (CHN)	Sin Myong-su (PRK)
1994 Hiroshima	Li Xiaoshuang (CHN)	Sergey Fedorchenko (KAZ)	Toshiharu Sato (JPN)
1998 Bangkok	Yang Wei (CHN)	Kim Dong-hwa (KOR)	Li Xiaopeng (CHN)
2002 Busan	Kim Seung-il (KOR)	Jo Jong-chol (PRK)	Yang Wei (CHN)
2006 Doha	Zou Kai (CHN)	Liang Fuliang (CHN)	Kim Soo-myun (KOR)
2010 Guangzhou	Zhang Chenglong (CHN)	Shared gold	Ashish Kumar (IND)
2010 Guangzhou	Kim Soo-myun (KOR)	Shared gold	Ashish Kumar (IND)
2014 Incheon	Zou Kai (CHN)	Huang Yuguo (CHN)	Yuya Kamoto (JPN)
2018 Jakarta–Palembang	Kim Han-sol (KOR)	Tang Chia-hung (TPE)	Lin Chaopan (CHN)
2022 Hangzhou	Kim Han-sol (KOR)	Zhang Boheng (CHN)	Lin Chaopan (CHN)
2026 Aichi-Nagoya	Carlos Yulo (PHI)	Milad Karimi (KAZ)	Shoma Tsukiyama (JPN)

=== Pommel horse ===
Games	Gold	Silver	Bronze
1974 Tehran	Cai Huanzong (CHN)	Yang Mingming (CHN)	Kim Hwi-chul (KOR)
1978 Bangkok	Cai Huanzong (CHN)	Shinzo Shiraishi (JPN)	Han Gwang-song (PRK)
1982 New Delhi	Li Ning (CHN)	Shared gold	Shared gold
1982 New Delhi	Li Xiaoping (CHN)	Shared gold	Shared gold
1982 New Delhi	Ri Chol-hon (PRK)	Shared gold	Shared gold
1986 Seoul	Yang Yueshan (CHN)	Li Ning (CHN)	Joo Young-sam (KOR)
1990 Beijing	Guo Linyao (CHN)	Li Jing (CHN)	Pae Gil-su (PRK)
1990 Beijing	Guo Linyao (CHN)	Li Jing (CHN)	Chang Feng-chih (TPE)
1994 Hiroshima	Huang Huadong (CHN)	Shared gold	Shared gold
1994 Hiroshima	Yoshiaki Hatakeda (JPN)	Shared gold	Shared gold
1994 Hiroshima	Lee Jang-hyung (KOR)	Shared gold	Shared gold
1998 Bangkok	Xing Aowei (CHN)	Shared gold	Huang Xu (CHN)
1998 Bangkok	Pae Gil-su (PRK)	Shared gold	Chiang Chien-tung (TPE)
2002 Busan	Teng Haibin (CHN)	Shared gold	Takehiro Kashima (JPN)
2002 Busan	Kim Hyon-il (PRK)	Shared gold	Takehiro Kashima (JPN)
2006 Doha	Hiroyuki Tomita (JPN)	Shared gold	Shared gold
2006 Doha	Kim Soo-myun (KOR)	Shared gold	Shared gold
2006 Doha	Jo Jong-chol (PRK)	Shared gold	Shared gold
2010 Guangzhou	Teng Haibin (CHN)	Yan Mingyong (CHN)	Huang Che-kuei (TPE)
2014 Incheon	Masayoshi Yamamoto (JPN)	Abdulla Azimov (UZB)	Park Min-soo (KOR)
2018 Jakarta–Palembang	Lee Chih-kai (TPE)	Zou Jingyuan (CHN)	Sun Wei (CHN)
2022 Hangzhou	Lee Chih-kai (TPE)	Ryota Tsumura (JPN)	Nariman Kurbanov (KAZ)
2026 Aichi-Nagoya	Utkirbek Juraev (UZB)	Arman Khodaei Valehzaghard (IRI)	Daiki Hashimoto (JPN)

=== Rings ===
Games	Gold	Silver	Bronze
1974 Tehran	Kim Kuk-han (KOR)	Liao Runtian (CHN)	Song Sun-bong (PRK)
1978 Bangkok	Huang Yubin (CHN)	Shared gold	Teruichi Okamura (JPN)
1978 Bangkok	Kim Gwang-jin (PRK)	Shared gold	Teruichi Okamura (JPN)
1982 New Delhi	Li Ning (CHN)	Shared gold	Huang Yubin (CHN)
1982 New Delhi	Ri Su-gil (PRK)	Shared gold	Huang Yubin (CHN)
1986 Seoul	Li Ning (CHN)	Kwon Soon-seong (KOR)	Lou Yun (CHN)
1990 Beijing	Li Ge (CHN)	Li Chunyang (CHN)	Masayuki Matsunaga (JPN)
1990 Beijing	Li Ge (CHN)	Li Chunyang (CHN)	Sin Myong-su (PRK)
1994 Hiroshima	Fan Hongbin (CHN)	Li Xiaoshuang (CHN)	Shared silver
1994 Hiroshima	Fan Hongbin (CHN)	Yoo Ok-ryul (KOR)	Shared silver
1998 Bangkok	Amornthep Waewsang (THA)	Huang Xu (CHN)	Yoshihiro Saito (JPN)
1998 Bangkok	Amornthep Waewsang (THA)	Huang Xu (CHN)	Chen Kuang-hui (TPE)
2002 Busan	Huang Xu (CHN)	Shared gold	Hiroyuki Tomita (JPN)
2002 Busan	Kim Dong-hwa (KOR)	Shared gold	Lai Kuo-cheng (TPE)
2006 Doha	Chen Yibing (CHN)	Shared gold	Timur Kurbanbayev (KAZ)
2006 Doha	Yang Wei (CHN)	Shared gold	Timur Kurbanbayev (KAZ)
2010 Guangzhou	Chen Yibing (CHN)	Yan Mingyong (CHN)	Chen Chih-yu (TPE)
2014 Incheon	Liao Junlin (CHN)	Kazuyuki Takeda (JPN)	Đặng Nam (VIE)
2018 Jakarta–Palembang	Deng Shudi (CHN)	Shogo Nonomura (JPN)	Chen Chih-yu (TPE)
2022 Hangzhou	Lan Xingyu (CHN)	Nguyễn Văn Khánh Phong (VIE)	Wataru Tanigawa (JPN)
2026 Aichi-Nagoya	Lan Xingyu (CHN)	Kiichi Kaneta (JPN)	Zou Jingyuan (CHN)

=== Vault ===
Games	Gold	Silver	Bronze
1974 Tehran	Kazuo Horide (JPN)	Cai Huanzong (CHN)	Hideyuki Nozawa (JPN)
1978 Bangkok	Junichi Kitagawa (JPN)	Toshiomi Nishikii (JPN)	Xiong Songliang (CHN)
1982 New Delhi	Lou Yun (CHN)	Koji Gushiken (JPN)	Ra Kwon (KOR)
1982 New Delhi	Lou Yun (CHN)	Koji Gushiken (JPN)	Ri Gil-su (PRK)
1986 Seoul	Lou Yun (CHN)	Kyoji Yamawaki (JPN)	Park Jong-hoon (KOR)
1990 Beijing	Li Jing (CHN)	Lee Joo-hyung (KOR)	Chang Feng-chih (TPE)
1994 Hiroshima	Yeo Hong-chul (KOR)	Li Dashuang (CHN)	Li Xiaoshuang (CHN)
1994 Hiroshima	Yeo Hong-chul (KOR)	Li Dashuang (CHN)	Lee Joo-hyung (KOR)
1998 Bangkok	Yeo Hong-chul (KOR)	Li Xiaopeng (CHN)	Naoya Tsukahara (JPN)
2002 Busan	Li Xiaopeng (CHN)	Yang Wei (CHN)	Kim Dae-eun (KOR)
2006 Doha	Ri Se-gwang (PRK)	Ng Shu Wai (MAS)	Yernar Yerimbetov (KAZ)
2010 Guangzhou	Yang Hak-seon (KOR)	Feng Zhe (CHN)	Stanislav Valiyev (KAZ)
2014 Incheon	Shek Wai Hung (HKG)	Yang Hak-seon (KOR)	Huang Xi (CHN)
2018 Jakarta–Palembang	Shek Wai Hung (HKG)	Kim Han-sol (KOR)	Agus Adi Prayoko (INA)
2022 Hangzhou	Wataru Tanigawa (JPN)	Mehdi Olfati (IRI)	Sharul Aimy (MAS)
2026 Aichi-Nagoya	Carlos Yulo (PHI)	Mahdi Olfati (IRI)	Ng Ka Ki (HKG)

=== Parallel bars ===
Games	Gold	Silver	Bronze
1974 Tehran	Lee Young-taik (KOR)	Cai Huanzong (CHN)	Shared silver
1974 Tehran	Lee Young-taik (KOR)	Hideyuki Nozawa (JPN)	Shared silver
1978 Bangkok	Junichi Kitagawa (JPN)	Cai Huanzong (CHN)	Pan Chenfei (CHN)
1982 New Delhi	Koji Gushiken (JPN)	Li Ning (CHN)	Shared silver
1982 New Delhi	Koji Gushiken (JPN)	Tong Fei (CHN)	Shared silver
1982 New Delhi	Koji Gushiken (JPN)	Ri Chol-hon (PRK)	Shared silver
1986 Seoul	Kwon Soon-seong (KOR)	Park Jong-hoon (KOR)	Lou Yun (CHN)
1986 Seoul	Kwon Soon-seong (KOR)	Park Jong-hoon (KOR)	Koichi Mizushima (JPN)
1990 Beijing	Guo Linyao (CHN)	Shared gold	Li Jing (CHN)
1990 Beijing	Lee Joo-hyung (KOR)	Shared gold	Toshiharu Sato (JPN)
1994 Hiroshima	Huang Liping (CHN)	Jung Jin-soo (KOR)	Li Xiaoshuang (CHN)
1998 Bangkok	Li Xiaopeng (CHN)	Zhang Jinjing (CHN)	Shared silver
1998 Bangkok	Li Xiaopeng (CHN)	Alexey Dmitriyenko (KAZ)	Shared silver
1998 Bangkok	Li Xiaopeng (CHN)	Jong U-chol (PRK)	Shared silver
1998 Bangkok	Li Xiaopeng (CHN)	Kim Chang-gyu (PRK)	Shared silver
2002 Busan	Huang Xu (CHN)	Shared gold	Kim Seung-il (KOR)
2002 Busan	Li Xiaopeng (CHN)	Shared gold	Kim Seung-il (KOR)
2006 Doha	Yang Wei (CHN)	Shared gold	Shun Kuwahara (JPN)
2006 Doha	Kim Dae-eun (KOR)	Shared gold	Shun Kuwahara (JPN)
2010 Guangzhou	Feng Zhe (CHN)	Anton Fokin (UZB)	Ildar Valeyev (KAZ)
2014 Incheon	Yuya Kamoto (JPN)	Anton Fokin (UZB)	Đinh Phương Thành (VIE)
2018 Jakarta–Palembang	Zou Jingyuan (CHN)	Xiao Ruoteng (CHN)	Kenta Chiba (JPN)
2022 Hangzhou	Zou Jingyuan (CHN)	Takeru Kitazono (JPN)	Kakeru Tanigawa (JPN)
2026 Aichi-Nagoya	Zou Jingyuan (CHN)	Shinnosuke Oka (JPN)	Rasuljon Abdurakhimov (UZB)

=== Horizontal bar ===
Games	Gold	Silver	Bronze
1974 Tehran	Cai Huanzong (CHN)	Kazuo Horide (JPN)	Pan Chenfei (CHN)
1978 Bangkok	Junichi Kitagawa (JPN)	Li Yuejiu (CHN)	Shared silver
1978 Bangkok	Junichi Kitagawa (JPN)	Haruyasu Taguchi (JPN)	Shared silver
1982 New Delhi	Noritoshi Hirata (JPN)	Shinji Morisue (JPN)	Tong Fei (CHN)
1986 Seoul	Yang Yueshan (CHN)	Li Ning (CHN)	Yukihiro Hayase (JPN)
1990 Beijing	Pae Gil-su (PRK)	Yukio Iketani (JPN)	Yoshiaki Hatakeda (JPN)
1994 Hiroshima	Li Jing (CHN)	Huang Liping (CHN)	Sergey Fedorchenko (KAZ)
1998 Bangkok	Zhang Jinjing (CHN)	Yoshihiro Saito (JPN)	Xing Aowei (CHN)
1998 Bangkok	Zhang Jinjing (CHN)	Yoshihiro Saito (JPN)	Lee Joo-hyung (KOR)
2002 Busan	Teng Haibin (CHN)	Shared gold	Shared gold
2002 Busan	Hiroyuki Tomita (JPN)	Shared gold	Shared gold
2002 Busan	Yang Tae-seok (KOR)	Shared gold	Shared gold
2006 Doha	Hisashi Mizutori (JPN)	Zou Kai (CHN)	Kim Ji-hoon (KOR)
2010 Guangzhou	Zhang Chenglong (CHN)	Shun Kuwahara (JPN)	Teng Haibin (CHN)
2014 Incheon	Zou Kai (CHN)	Yusuke Saito (JPN)	Masayoshi Yamamoto (JPN)
2018 Jakarta–Palembang	Tang Chia-hung (TPE)	Sun Wei (CHN)	Xiao Ruoteng (CHN)
2022 Hangzhou	Zhang Boheng (CHN)	Lin Chaopan (CHN)	Kakeru Tanigawa (JPN)
2026 Aichi-Nagoya	Tian Hao (CHN)	Shinnosuke Oka (JPN)	Eldrew Yulo (PHI)

== Women's artistic ==
=== Team ===
Games	Gold	Silver	Bronze
1974 Tehran	China (CHN); Ding Zhaofang; Jiang Shaoyi; Ning Xiaolin; Wang Guiping; Wang Xuejun; Xin Guiqiu	North Korea (PRK); Hwang Jo-ya; Jo Yoon-hi; Kim Choon-soo; Pak Yung-sook	Japan (JPN); Kazue Hanyu; Chieko Kito; Kumiko Nagaoka; Yuko Nakamoto; Misa Watanabe; Reiko Yoshida
1978 Bangkok	China (CHN); He Xiumin; Liu Yajun; Ma Wenju; Ma Yanhong; Wang Ping; Zhu Zheng	North Korea (PRK); Choe Jong-sil; Jong Hyang-suk; Kim Chun-pil; Kim Chun-son; Ri Yong-ok; Sin Myong-ok	Japan (JPN); Yayoi Kano; Nobuko Kasai; Yoshiko Matsumoto; Maki Matsuya; Noriko Okazaki; Ayako Saito
1982 New Delhi	China (CHN); Chen Yongyan; Li Cuiling; Wen Jia; Wu Jiani; Xiang Yu; Yang Yanli	North Korea (PRK); Choe Jong-sil; Choe Mil-hyang; Choe Myong-hui; Choe Sun-sil; Ri Sun-ok; Ri Yong-ae	Japan (JPN); Kanae Abe; Yayoi Kano; Maiko Morio; Kazumi Nagayama; Katsura Uchida; Kiyomi Ueda
1986 Seoul	China (CHN); Chen Cuiting; Huang Qun; Ma Ying; Qin Qizhi; Wang Huiying; Yu Feng	South Korea (KOR); Han Kyung-im; Jeon Hea-ryung; Seo Seon-ang; Seo Yeon-hee; Shim Jae-young; Suk Soo-kwang	Japan (JPN); Asako Inoue; Noriko Mochizuki; Maiko Morio; Tomoko Okabe; Sawako Wada; Yoko Yamanaka
1990 Beijing	China (CHN); Chen Cuiting; Fan Di; Li Li; Li Yifang; Yang Bo; Zhang Wenning	North Korea (PRK); An Myong-hwa; Choi Gyong-hui; Hwang Bo-sil; Kim Gwang-suk; Om Song-hui; Ri Chun-mi	South Korea (KOR); Bae Eun-mi; Cho Eun-jin; Han Na-jung; Lee Hee-kyung; Min A-young; Park Ji-sook
1994 Hiroshima	China (CHN); He Xuemei; Liu Xuan; Mo Huilan; Qiao Ya; Wang Xin; Ye Linlin; Yuan Kexia	Japan (JPN); Yuka Arai; Mari Kosuge; Hanako Miura; Satsuki Obata; Masumi Okawa; Aya Sekine; Risa Sugawara	South Korea (KOR); Han Na-jung; Hu So-young; Ji Hae-sung; Kim Yoon-ji; Oh Eun-mi; Park Ji-young; Park Joo-young
1998 Bangkok	China (CHN); Bi Wenjing; Kui Yuanyuan; Ling Jie; Liu Xuan; Meng Fei; Xu Jing	Japan (JPN); Miho Hashiguchi; Ayako Kitamura; Yuki Ohata; Eri Okumoto; Risa Sugawara; Satomi Yamamoto	Kazakhstan (KAZ); Olga Kozhevnikova; Olga Nuraliyeva; Oxana Yemelyanova; Irina Yevdokimova; Inna Zhuravleva
2002 Busan	China (CHN); Chen Miaojie; Huang Jing; Kang Xin; Liu Wei; Sun Xiaojiao; Zhang Nan	North Korea (PRK); Han Jong-ok; Hwang Kum-hui; Kim Un-jong; Kim Yong-sil; Pyon Kwang-sun; So Jong-ok	Japan (JPN); Manami Ishizaka; Aya Manabe; Erika Mizoguchi; Kyoko Oshima; Ayaka Sahara; Miki Uemura
2006 Doha	China (CHN); Cheng Fei; Han Bing; He Ning; Pang Panpan; Zhang Nan; Zhou Zhuoru	Japan (JPN); Manami Ishizaka; Mayu Kuroda; Erika Mizoguchi; Kyoko Oshima; Ayaka Sahara; Miki Uemura	South Korea (KOR); Bae Mul-eum; Han Eun-bi; Kang Ji-na; Kim Hyo-bin; Yeo Su-jung; Yu Han-sol
2010 Guangzhou	China (CHN); Deng Linlin; He Kexin; Huang Qiushuang; Jiang Yuyuan; Sui Lu; Yang Yilin	Japan (JPN); Kyoko Oshima; Momoko Ozawa; Yuko Shintake; Rie Tanaka; Koko Tsurumi; Mai Yamagishi	Uzbekistan (UZB); Darya Elizarova; Luiza Galiulina; Yuliya Goreva; Diana Karimdjanova; Asal Saparbaeva; Irina Volodchenko
2014 Incheon	China (CHN); Bai Yawen; Chen Siyi; Huang Huidan; Shang Chunsong; Tan Jiaxin; Yao Jinnan	North Korea (PRK); Hong Un-jong; Jong Un-gyong; Kang Yong-mi; Kim So-yong; Kim Un-hyang; Ri Un-ha	Japan (JPN); Minami Honda; Azumi Ishikura; Mizuho Nagai; Akiho Sato; Yuriko Yamamoto; Sakura Yumoto
2018 Jakarta–Palembang	China (CHN); Chen Yile; Liu Jinru; Liu Tingting; Luo Huan; Zhang Jin	North Korea (PRK); Jon Jang-mi; Jong Un-gyong; Kim Su-jong; Kim Won-yong; Pyon Rye-yong	Japan (JPN); Soyoka Hanawa; Shiho Nakaji; Yumika Nakamura; Yuki Uchiyama; Yurika Yumoto
2022 Hangzhou	China (CHN); Tang Xijing; Yu Linmin; Zhang Jin; Zhang Xinyi; Zuo Tong	Japan (JPN); Misaki Masui; Mana Okamura; Mikako Serita; Kohane Ushioku	North Korea (PRK); An Chang-ok; Kim Son-hyang; Kim Su-jong; Ryu Mi-rae; Sim Hae-won
2026 Aichi-Nagoya	China (CHN); Du Siyu; Ke Qinqin; Zhang Qingying; Zhang Yihan; Qiu Qiyuan	Japan (JPN); Misa Nishiyama; Haruka Nakamura; Rina Kishi; Mana Okamura; Aiko Sugihara	North Korea (PRK); Kim Kyong Ryong; Han Yon Mi; Jo Kyong Byol; Pak Un Jong; An Chang-ok

=== Individual all-around ===
Games	Gold	Silver	Bronze
1974 Tehran	Jiang Shaoyi (CHN)	Ning Xiaolin (CHN)	Xin Guiqiu (CHN)
1978 Bangkok	He Xiumin (CHN)	Liu Yajun (CHN)	Shared silver
1978 Bangkok	He Xiumin (CHN)	Zhu Zheng (CHN)	Shared silver
1982 New Delhi	Chen Yongyan (CHN)	Wu Jiani (CHN)	Choe Jong-sil (PRK)
1986 Seoul	Chen Cuiting (CHN)	Huang Qun (CHN)	Yu Feng (CHN)
1990 Beijing	Chen Cuiting (CHN)	Li Yifang (CHN)	Kim Gwang-suk (PRK)
1994 Hiroshima	Qiao Ya (CHN)	Yuan Kexia (CHN)	Mo Huilan (CHN)
1998 Bangkok	Liu Xuan (CHN)	Irina Yevdokimova (KAZ)	Risa Sugawara (JPN)
2002 Busan	Zhang Nan (CHN)	Oksana Chusovitina (UZB)	Kang Xin (CHN)
2006 Doha	He Ning (CHN)	Zhou Zhuoru (CHN)	Hong Su-jong (PRK)
2010 Guangzhou	Sui Lu (CHN)	Huang Qiushuang (CHN)	Rie Tanaka (JPN)
2014 Incheon	Yao Jinnan (CHN)	Shang Chunsong (CHN)	Yun Na-rae (KOR)
2018 Jakarta–Palembang	Chen Yile (CHN)	Luo Huan (CHN)	Kim Su-jong (PRK)
2022 Hangzhou	Zuo Tong (CHN)	Mana Okamura (JPN)	Kim Su-jong (PRK)
2026 Aichi-Nagoya	Aiko Sugihara (JPN)	Ke Qinqin (CHN)	Misa Nishiyama (JPN)

=== Vault ===
Games	Gold	Silver	Bronze
1974 Tehran	Reiko Yoshida (JPN)	Hwang Jo-ya (PRK)	Jo Yoon-hi (PRK)
1978 Bangkok	Choe Jong-sil (PRK)	Chung Jin-ai (KOR)	Ma Wenju (CHN)
1982 New Delhi	Li Cuiling (CHN)	Chen Yongyan (CHN)	Lee Jung-hee (KOR)
1986 Seoul	Ma Ying (CHN)	Chen Cuiting (CHN)	Suk Soo-kwang (KOR)
1990 Beijing	Kyoko Seo (JPN)	Chen Cuiting (CHN)	Park Ji-sook (KOR)
1994 Hiroshima	Mo Huilan (CHN)	Ye Linlin (CHN)	Oksana Chusovitina (UZB)
1998 Bangkok	Kui Yuanyuan (CHN)	Svetlana Bakhridinova (UZB)	Xu Jing (CHN)
1998 Bangkok	Kui Yuanyuan (CHN)	Svetlana Bakhridinova (UZB)	Irina Yevdokimova (KAZ)
2002 Busan	Oksana Chusovitina (UZB)	Liu Wei (CHN)	Huang Jing (CHN)
2006 Doha	Cheng Fei (CHN)	Hong Su-jong (PRK)	Hong Un-jong (PRK)
2010 Guangzhou	Huang Qiushuang (CHN)	Rie Tanaka (JPN)	Momoko Ozawa (JPN)
2014 Incheon	Hong Un-jong (PRK)	Oksana Chusovitina (UZB)	Phan Thị Hà Thanh (VIE)
2018 Jakarta–Palembang	Yeo Seo-jeong (KOR)	Oksana Chusovitina (UZB)	Pyon Rye-yong (PRK)
2022 Hangzhou	An Chang-ok (PRK)	Kim Son-hyang (PRK)	Yu Linmin (CHN)
2026 Aichi-Nagoya	Yeo Seo-jeong (KOR)	An Chang-ok (PRK)	Du Siyu (CHN)

=== Uneven bars ===
Games	Gold	Silver	Bronze
1974 Tehran	Jiang Shaoyi (CHN)	Shared gold	Hwang Jo-ya (PRK)
1974 Tehran	Jo Yoon-hi (PRK)	Shared gold	Hwang Jo-ya (PRK)
1978 Bangkok	Ma Yanhong (CHN)	Zhu Zheng (CHN)	Jong Hyang-suk (PRK)
1982 New Delhi	Wu Jiani (CHN)	Choe Jong-sil (PRK)	Shared silver
1982 New Delhi	Wu Jiani (CHN)	Ri Yong-ae (PRK)	Shared silver
1986 Seoul	Huang Qun (CHN)	Shared gold	Yu Feng (CHN)
1986 Seoul	Seo Yeon-hee (KOR)	Shared gold	Yu Feng (CHN)
1990 Beijing	Fan Di (CHN)	Li Li (CHN)	Shared silver
1990 Beijing	Fan Di (CHN)	Kim Gwang-suk (PRK)	Shared silver
1994 Hiroshima	Mo Huilan (CHN)	Liu Xuan (CHN)	Oksana Chusovitina (UZB)
1998 Bangkok	Bi Wenjing (CHN)	Kang Sun-yong (PRK)	Yuki Ohata (JPN)
2002 Busan	Zhang Nan (CHN)	Shared gold	So Jong-ok (PRK)
2002 Busan	Han Jong-ok (PRK)	Shared gold	So Jong-ok (PRK)
2006 Doha	Hong Su-jong (PRK)	He Ning (CHN)	Miki Uemura (JPN)
2010 Guangzhou	He Kexin (CHN)	Huang Qiushuang (CHN)	Koko Tsurumi (JPN)
2014 Incheon	Yao Jinnan (CHN)	Huang Huidan (CHN)	Kang Yong-mi (PRK)
2018 Jakarta–Palembang	Liu Tingting (CHN)	Luo Huan (CHN)	Jon Jang-mi (PRK)
2022 Hangzhou	An Chang-ok (PRK)	Mikako Serita (JPN)	Zuo Tong (CHN)
2026 Aichi-Nagoya	Qiu Qiyuan (CHN)	Misa Nishiyama (JPN)	Zhang Qingying (CHN)

=== Balance beam ===
Games	Gold	Silver	Bronze
1974 Tehran	Jiang Shaoyi (CHN)	Xin Guiqiu (CHN)	Jo Yoon-hi (PRK)
1978 Bangkok	Zhu Zheng (CHN)	Park Jung-sook (KOR)	Liu Yajun (CHN)
1982 New Delhi	Wu Jiani (CHN)	Xiang Yu (CHN)	Maiko Morio (JPN)
1986 Seoul	Seo Seon-ang (KOR)	Huang Qun (CHN)	Han Kyung-im (KOR)
1990 Beijing	Ri Chun-mi (PRK)	Li Yifang (CHN)	Yang Bo (CHN)
1994 Hiroshima	Mo Huilan (CHN)	Qiao Ya (CHN)	Irina Yevdokimova (KAZ)
1998 Bangkok	Liu Xuan (CHN)	Meng Fei (CHN)	Olga Kozhevnikova (KAZ)
2002 Busan	Kang Xin (CHN)	Oksana Chusovitina (UZB)	Pyon Kwang-sun (PRK)
2006 Doha	Zhang Nan (CHN)	Han Bing (CHN)	Miki Uemura (JPN)
2010 Guangzhou	Sui Lu (CHN)	Deng Linlin (CHN)	Luiza Galiulina (UZB)
2014 Incheon	Kim Un-hyang (PRK)	Phan Thị Hà Thanh (VIE)	Shang Chunsong (CHN)
2018 Jakarta–Palembang	Chen Yile (CHN)	Kim Su-jong (PRK)	Zhang Jin (CHN)
2022 Hangzhou	Mana Okamura (JPN)	Tang Xijing (CHN)	Ting Hua-tien (TPE)
2026 Aichi-Nagoya	Hwang Seo-hyun (KOR)	Qiu Qiyuan (CHN)	Mana Okamura (JPN)

=== Floor ===
Games	Gold	Silver	Bronze
1974 Tehran	Jiang Shaoyi (CHN)	Ning Xiaolin (CHN)	Jo Yoon-hi (PRK)
1978 Bangkok	Ma Wenju (CHN)	Wang Ping (CHN)	Yayoi Kano (JPN)
1982 New Delhi	Choe Jong-sil (PRK)	Wen Jia (CHN)	Shared silver
1982 New Delhi	Choe Jong-sil (PRK)	Wu Jiani (CHN)	Shared silver
1986 Seoul	Chen Cuiting (CHN)	Yu Feng (CHN)	Shim Jae-young (KOR)
1990 Beijing	Chen Cuiting (CHN)	Mari Kosuge (JPN)	Shared silver
1990 Beijing	Chen Cuiting (CHN)	Lee Hee-kyung (KOR)	Shared silver
1994 Hiroshima	Mo Huilan (CHN)	Ye Linlin (CHN)	Irina Yevdokimova (KAZ)
1998 Bangkok	Xu Jing (CHN)	Kui Yuanyuan (CHN)	Risa Sugawara (JPN)
1998 Bangkok	Xu Jing (CHN)	Kui Yuanyuan (CHN)	Irina Yevdokimova (KAZ)
2002 Busan	Zhang Nan (CHN)	Shared gold	Kim Ji-young (KOR)
2002 Busan	Oksana Chusovitina (UZB)	Shared gold	Kim Ji-young (KOR)
2006 Doha	Cheng Fei (CHN)	Pang Panpan (CHN)	Kyoko Oshima (JPN)
2010 Guangzhou	Sui Lu (CHN)	Mai Yamagishi (JPN)	Jo Hyun-joo (KOR)
2014 Incheon	Yao Jinnan (CHN)	Shang Chunsong (CHN)	Yun Na-rae (KOR)
2018 Jakarta–Palembang	Kim Su-jong (PRK)	Rifda Irfanaluthfi (INA)	Shiho Nakaji (JPN)
2022 Hangzhou	Zhang Jin (CHN)	Kim Son-hyang (PRK)	Lim Su-min (KOR)
2026 Aichi-Nagoya	Aiko Sugihara (JPN)	Misa Nishiyama (JPN)	Zhang Yihan (CHN)

== Rhythmic ==
=== Team ===
Games	Gold	Silver	Bronze
1998 Bangkok	China (CHN); Dong Weihua; Pu Yunfei; Wang Weixiao; Zhou Xiaojing	Japan (JPN); Mikako Iwamoto; Rieko Matsunaga; Yukari Murata	South Korea (KOR); Cho Eun-jung; Choi Ye-lim; Kim Eun-hae; Kim Min-jung
2002 Busan	China (CHN); Sun Dan; Zhang Shuo; Zhong Ling; Zhu Minhong	Kazakhstan (KAZ); Aida Krasnikova; Lola Yeros; Aliya Yussupova; Zaira Zhakupova	South Korea (KOR); Cho Eun-jung; Choi Ye-lim; Lee Ji-ae; Yoo Seong-oeun
2006 Doha	Kazakhstan (KAZ); Aidana Kauldasheva; Aliya Yussupova; Maiya Zainullina	Japan (JPN); Yukari Murata; Sayaka Nakano; Yuria Onuki; Ai Yokochi	China (CHN); Ding Yidan; Li Hongyang; Liang Yuting; Xiao Yiming
2010 Guangzhou	Kazakhstan (KAZ); Anna Alyabyeva; Mizana Ismailova; Madina Mukanova; Marina Petrakova	Uzbekistan (UZB); Djamila Rakhmatova; Zamirajon Sanokulova; Ulyana Trofimova	Japan (JPN); Riko Anakubo; Natsuki Konishi; Yuria Onuki; Runa Yamaguchi
2014 Incheon	Uzbekistan (UZB); Valeriya Davidova; Ravilya Farkhutdinova; Djamila Rakhmatova; Anastasiya Serdyukova	South Korea (KOR); Gim Yun-hee; Lee Da-ae; Lee Na-kyung; Son Yeon-jae	Kazakhstan (KAZ); Sabina Ashirbayeva; Aliya Assymova; Viktoriya Gorbunova; Yekaterina Skorikova
2018 Jakarta–Palembang	Kazakhstan (KAZ); Dayana Abdirbekova; Alina Adilkhanova; Adilya Tlekenova	Uzbekistan (UZB); Asal Ikramova; Dildora Rakhmatova; Sabina Tashkenbaeva; Nurinisso Usmanova	South Korea (KOR); Kim Chae-woon; Kim Joo-won; Lim Se-eun; Seo Go-eun
2022 Hangzhou	Uzbekistan (UZB); Evelina Atalyants; Takhmina Ikromova; Vilana Savadyan	Kazakhstan (KAZ); Milana Parfilova; Elzhana Taniyeva; Erika Zhailauova	China (CHN); Li Huilin; Wang Zilu; Zhao Yating; Zhao Yue

=== Individual all-around ===
Games	Gold	Silver	Bronze
1994 Hiroshima	Yukari Kawamoto (JPN)	Zhou Xiaojing (CHN)	Miho Yamada (JPN)
1998 Bangkok	Zhou Xiaojing (CHN)	Yun Myong-ran (PRK)	Wang Weixiao (CHN)
2002 Busan	Zhong Ling (CHN)	Aliya Yussupova (KAZ)	Yukari Murata (JPN)
2006 Doha	Aliya Yussupova (KAZ)	Yukari Murata (JPN)	Xiao Yiming (CHN)
2010 Guangzhou	Anna Alyabyeva (KAZ)	Ulyana Trofimova (UZB)	Son Yeon-jae (KOR)
2014 Incheon	Son Yeon-jae (KOR)	Deng Senyue (CHN)	Anastasiya Serdyukova (UZB)
2018 Jakarta–Palembang	Alina Adilkhanova (KAZ)	Sabina Tashkenbaeva (UZB)	Zhao Yating (CHN)
2022 Hangzhou	Takhmina Ikromova (UZB)	Elzhana Taniyeva (KAZ)	Milana Parfilova (KAZ)

== Trampoline ==
=== Men's individual ===
Games	Gold	Silver	Bronze
2006 Doha	Que Zhicheng (CHN)	Lu Chunlong (CHN)	Shunsuke Nagasaki (JPN)
2010 Guangzhou	Dong Dong (CHN)	Tu Xiao (CHN)	Tetsuya Sotomura (JPN)
2014 Incheon	Dong Dong (CHN)	Tu Xiao (CHN)	Yasuhiro Ueyama (JPN)
2018 Jakarta–Palembang	Dong Dong (CHN)	Gao Lei (CHN)	Pirmammad Aliyev (KAZ)
2022 Hangzhou	Yan Langyu (CHN)	Danil Mussabayev (KAZ)	Hiroto Yamada (JPN)
2026 Aichi-Nagoya	Yan Langyu (CHN)	Wang Zisai (CHN)	Yerlan Tasmagambetov (KAZ)

=== Women's individual ===
Games	Gold	Silver	Bronze
2006 Doha	Huang Shanshan (CHN)	Zhong Xingping (CHN)	Ekaterina Khilko (UZB)
2010 Guangzhou	Huang Shanshan (CHN)	He Wenna (CHN)	Ekaterina Khilko (UZB)
2014 Incheon	Li Dan (CHN)	Zhong Xingping (CHN)	Ayano Kishi (JPN)
2018 Jakarta–Palembang	Liu Lingling (CHN)	Hikaru Mori (JPN)	Zhu Shouli (CHN)
2022 Hangzhou	Zhu Xueying (CHN)	Hu Yicheng (CHN)	Viktoriya Butolina (KAZ)
2026 Aichi-Nagoya	Hikaru Mori (JPN)	Megu Uyama (JPN)	Qiu Zheng (CHN)
