= 1997–1998 FIG Artistic Gymnastics World Cup series =

International gymnastics competition series

The 1997–1998 FIG Artistic Gymnastics World Cup series was a series of stages where events in men's and women's artistic gymnastics were contested. The International Gymnastics Federation revived the World Cup, an event which was not held since 1990, as a two-year long competition, culminating at a final event — the World Cup Final in 1998. A number of qualifier stages were held. The top 3 gymnast in each apparatus at the qualifier events would receive medals and prize money. Gymnasts who finished in the top 8 would also receive points that would be added up to a ranking which would qualify individual gymnasts for the biennial World Cup Final.

== Stages ==
Year	Event	Location
1997	World Cup qualifier	Stuttgart, Germany
1997	World Cup qualifier	Zürich, Switzerland
1998	World Cup qualifier	Paris, France
1998	World Cup qualifier	Vancouver, Canada
1998	World Cup Final	Mie, Japan

== Medalists ==
=== Men ===
Competition	Event	Gold	Silver	Bronze
Stuttgart (1997)	Floor exercise	(China) Li Xiaopeng	(Russia) Aleksei Nemov	(France) Dimitri Karbanenko
Stuttgart (1997)	Pommel horse	(Romania) Marius Urzică	(Germany) Valery Belenky	(France) Eric Poujade
Stuttgart (1997)	Rings	(Belarus) Ivan Ivankov	(Hungary) Szilveszter Csollány	(Germany) Valery Belenky
Stuttgart (1997)	Vault	(Russia) Aleksei Nemov	(Kazakhstan) Sergei Fedorchenko	(Ukraine) Hrihoriy Misyutin
Stuttgart (1997)	Parallel bars	(Belarus) Ivan Ivankov	(Spain) Andreu Vivó	(China) Li Xiaopeng
Stuttgart (1997)	Horizontal bar	(Spain) Jesús Carballo	(Kazakhstan) Sergei Fedorchenko	(Belarus) Ivan Ivankov
Zurich (1997)	Floor exercise	(China) Li Xiaopeng	(Russia) Aleksei Bondarenko	(Russia) Aleksei Nemov
Zurich (1997)	Pommel horse	(France) Eric Poujade	(China) Zhang Jinjing	(Germany) Valery Belenky
Zurich (1997)	Rings	(Hungary) Szilveszter Csollány	(Belarus) Ivan Ivankov	(Germany) Valery Belenky
Zurich (1997)	Vault	(Kazakhstan) Sergei Fedorchenko	(South Korea) Yeo Hong-chul	(Russia) Aleksei Nemov
Zurich (1997)	Parallel bars	(China) Zhang Jinjing	(China) Li Xiaopeng	(Belarus) Ivan Ivankov
Zurich (1997)	Horizontal bar	(Spain) Jesús Carballo	(Belarus) Ivan Ivankov	(Russia) Aleksei Nemov
Paris (1998)	Floor exercise	(France) Dimitri Karbanenko	(Russia) Aleksei Bondarenko	(Kazakhstan) Sergei Fedorchenko
Paris (1998)	Pommel horse	(France) Eric Poujade	(Belarus) Ivan Ivankov	(Ukraine) Alexander Beresch
Paris (1998)	Rings	(Belarus) Ivan Ivankov	(Hungary) Szilveszter Csollány	(Italy) Roberto Galli
Paris (1998)	Vault	(Kazakhstan) Sergei Fedorchenko	(Poland) Leszek Blanik	(Russia) Aleksei Bondarenko
Paris (1998)	Parallel bars	(China) Zhang Jinjing	(Belarus) Ivan Ivankov	(China) Li Xiaopeng
Paris (1998)	Horizontal bar	(Slovenia) Aljaž Pegan	(Belarus) Ivan Ivankov	(Ukraine) Alexander Beresch
Vancouver (1998)	Floor exercise	(Russia) Aleksei Bondarenko	(Russia) Aleksei Nemov	(China) Li Xiaopeng
Vancouver (1998)	Pommel horse	(France) Eric Poujade	(China) Zhang Jinjing	(Russia) Aleksei Nemov
Vancouver (1998)	Rings	(Hungary) Szilveszter Csollány	(Greece) Dimosthenis Tampakos	(Russia) Aleksei Bondarenko
Vancouver (1998)	Vault	(Kazakhstan) Sergei Fedorchenko	(Poland) Leszek Blanik	(South Korea) Yeo Hong-chul
Vancouver (1998)	Parallel bars	(Belarus) Ivan Ivankov	(China) Huang Xu	(Slovenia) Mitja Petkovšek
Vancouver (1998)	Horizontal bar	(Spain) Jesús Carballo	(Russia) Aleksei Nemov	(Belarus) Ivan Ivankov
Mie (1998 World Cup Final)	Floor exercise	(China) Li Xiaopeng	(Russia) Aleksei Nemov	(Japan) Isao Yoneda
Mie (1998 World Cup Final)	Pommel horse	(France) Eric Poujade (Romania) Marius Urzică (China) Zhang Jinjing	—N/a	—N/a
Mie (1998 World Cup Final)	Rings	(Hungary) Szilveszter Csollány	(Belarus) Ivan Ivankov	(Japan) Shigeru Kurihara
Mie (1998 World Cup Final)	Vault	(Russia) Aleksei Nemov	(Russia) Aleksei Bondarenko	(Kazakhstan) Sergei Fedorchenko
Mie (1998 World Cup Final)	Parallel bars	(Kazakhstan) Aleksey Dmitrienko (China) Li Xiaopeng (China) Zhang Jinjing	—N/a	—N/a
Mie (1998 World Cup Final)	Horizontal bar	(Belarus) Ivan Ivankov	(Kazakhstan) Sergei Fedorchenko	(Hungary) Zoltán Supola

=== Women ===
Competition	Event	Gold	Silver	Bronze
Stuttgart (1997)	Vault	(Romania) Simona Amânar	(Hungary) Adrienn Varga	(Romania) Gina Gogean
Stuttgart (1997)	Uneven bars	(Russia) Svetlana Khorkina	(China) Bi Wenjing	(China) Liu Xuan
Stuttgart (1997)	Balance beam	(Romania) Gina Gogean	(Russia) Svetlana Khorkina	(China) Bi Wenjing
Stuttgart (1997)	Floor exercise	(Russia) Svetlana Khorkina	(Romania) Gina Gogean	(Romania) Simona Amânar
Zurich (1997)	Vault	(China) Kui Yuanyuan	(Russia) Svetlana Khorkina	(Hungary) Adrienn Varga
Zurich (1997)	Uneven bars	(China) Bi Wenjing	(Russia) Svetlana Khorkina	(China) Liu Xuan
Zurich (1997)	Balance beam	(China) Kui Yuanyuan	(France) Ludivine Furnon	(Ukraine) Olga Teslenko
Zurich (1997)	Floor exercise	(Russia) Svetlana Khorkina	(France) Ludivine Furnon	(Belarus) Alena Polozkova
Paris (1998)	Vault	(Romania) Simona Amânar	(Hungary) Adrienn Varga	(China) Kui Yuanyuan
Paris (1998)	Uneven bars	(China) Bi Wenjing	(Russia) Svetlana Khorkina	(France) Elvire Teza
Paris (1998)	Balance beam	(Romania) Gina Gogean	(France) Elvire Teza	(China) Liu Xuan
Paris (1998)	Floor exercise	(Belarus) Alena Polozkova	(Russia) Elena Produnova	(France) Ludivine Furnon
Vancouver (1998)	Vault	(Hungary) Adrienn Varga	(Romania) Simona Amânar	(China) Kui Yuanyuan
Vancouver (1998)	Uneven bars	(China) Liu Xuan	(China) Bi Wenjing	(United States) Elise Ray
Vancouver (1998)	Balance beam	(China) Bi Wenjing	(China) Kui Yuanyuan	(France) Ludivine Furnon
Vancouver (1998)	Floor exercise	(France) Ludivine Furnon	(Belarus) Alena Polozkova	(Russia) Svetlana Khorkina
Mie (1998 World Cup Final)	Vault	(Romania) Simona Amânar	(Romania) Gina Gogean	(China) Kui Yuanyuan
Mie (1998 World Cup Final)	Uneven bars	(China) Bi Wenjing	(Russia) Svetlana Khorkina	(China) Liu Xuan
Mie (1998 World Cup Final)	Balance beam	(China) Liu Xuan	(China) Kui Yuanyuan	(Romania) Gina Gogean
Mie (1998 World Cup Final)	Floor exercise	(Romania) Simona Amânar	(Romania) Gina Gogean	(Belarus) Alena Polozkova

=== Medal table ===
==== Overall ====
Rank	Nation	Gold	Silver	Bronze	Total
1	China	16	8	11	35
2	Romania	8	4	3	15
3	Russia	6	13	7	26
4	Belarus	6	7	5	18
5	France	6	3	5	14
6	Hungary	4	4	2	10
7	Kazakhstan	4	3	2	9
8	Spain	3	1	0	4
9	Slovenia	1	0	1	2
10	Poland	0	2	0	2
11	Germany	0	1	3	4
12	South Korea	0	1	1	2
13	Greece	0	1	0	1
14	Ukraine	0	0	4	4
15	Japan	0	0	2	2
16	Italy	0	0	1	1
16	United States	0	0	1	1
Totals (17 entries)		54	48	48	150

==== Men ====
Rank	Nation	Gold	Silver	Bronze	Total
1	China	8	4	3	15
2	Belarus	5	6	3	14
3	France	5	0	2	7
4	Kazakhstan	4	3	2	9
5	Russia	3	7	6	16
6	Hungary	3	2	1	6
7	Spain	3	1	0	4
8	Romania	2	0	0	2
9	Slovenia	1	0	1	2
10	Poland	0	2	0	2
11	Germany	0	1	3	4
12	South Korea	0	1	1	2
13	Greece	0	1	0	1
14	Ukraine	0	0	3	3
15	Japan	0	0	2	2
16	Italy	0	0	1	1
Totals (16 entries)		34	28	28	90

==== Women ====
Rank	Nation	Gold	Silver	Bronze	Total
1	China	8	4	8	20
2	Romania	6	4	3	13
3	Russia	3	6	1	10
4	France	1	3	3	7
5	Hungary	1	2	1	4
6	Belarus	1	1	2	4
7	Ukraine	0	0	1	1
7	United States	0	0	1	1
Totals (8 entries)		20	20	20	60
