= Gymnastics at the 1978 Asian Games =

- Venue: National Gymnasium
- Dates: 9–11 December 1978

Gymnastics was contested at the 1978 Asian Games, held in Bangkok, Thailand from December 9, 1978, to December 11, 1978. Only artistic events were contested.

== Medalists ==
=== Men ===
| Event | Gold | Silver | Bronze |
|---|---|---|---|
| Team | China; Cai Huanzong; Huang Yubin; Li Yuejiu; Pan Chenfei; Peng Yaping; Xiong Songliang | Japan; Nobuyuki Kajitani; Junichi Kitagawa; Toshiomi Nishikii; Teruichi Okamura; Shinzo Shiraishi; Haruyasu Taguchi | South Korea; Cho Tai-ho; Kim Hwi-chul; Kwon Oh-suk; Lee Dae-haeng; Lee Young-taik; Shin Jong-soon |
| Individual all-around | Cai Huanzong; China | Xiong Songliang; China | Li Yuejiu; China |
| Floor | Li Yuejiu; China | Peng Yaping; China | Kim Hwi-chul; South Korea |
| Pommel horse | Cai Huanzong; China | Shinzo Shiraishi; Japan | Han Gwang-song; North Korea |
| Rings | Huang Yubin; China | Shared gold | Teruichi Okamura; Japan |
| Rings | Kim Gwang-jin; North Korea | Shared gold | Teruichi Okamura; Japan |
| Vault | Junichi Kitagawa; Japan | Toshiomi Nishikii; Japan | Xiong Songliang; China |
| Parallel bars | Junichi Kitagawa; Japan | Cai Huanzong; China | Pan Chenfei; China |
| Horizontal bar | Junichi Kitagawa; Japan | Li Yuejiu; China | Shared silver |
| Horizontal bar | Junichi Kitagawa; Japan | Haruyasu Taguchi; Japan | Shared silver |

=== Women ===
| Event | Gold | Silver | Bronze |
|---|---|---|---|
| Team | China; He Xiumin; Liu Yajun; Ma Wenju; Ma Yanhong; Wang Ping; Zhu Zheng | North Korea; Choe Jong-sil; Jong Hyang-suk; Kim Chun-pil; Kim Chun-son; Ri Yong-ok; Sin Myong-ok | Japan; Yayoi Kano; Nobuko Kasai; Yoshiko Matsumoto; Maki Matsuya; Noriko Okazaki; Ayako Saito |
| Individual all-around | He Xiumin; China | Liu Yajun; China | Shared silver |
| Individual all-around | He Xiumin; China | Zhu Zheng; China | Shared silver |
| Vault | Choe Jong-sil; North Korea | Chung Jin-ai; South Korea | Ma Wenju; China |
| Uneven bars | Ma Yanhong; China | Zhu Zheng; China | Jong Hyang-suk; North Korea |
| Balance beam | Zhu Zheng; China | Park Jung-sook; South Korea | Liu Yajun; China |
| Floor | Ma Wenju; China | Wang Ping; China | Yayoi Kano; Japan |

== Medal table ==
| Rank | Nation | Gold | Silver | Bronze | Total |
|---|---|---|---|---|---|
| 1 | China (CHN) | 10 | 8 | 5 | 23 |
| 2 | Japan (JPN) | 3 | 4 | 3 | 10 |
| 3 | North Korea (PRK) | 2 | 1 | 2 | 5 |
| 4 | South Korea (KOR) | 0 | 2 | 2 | 4 |
| Totals (4 entries) | | 15 | 15 | 12 | 42 |
