= Gymnastics at the 1998 Asian Games =

- Venue: Land Sports Complex
- Dates: 8–13 December 1998

Gymnastics was contested at the 1998 Asian Games in IMPACT Hall, Bangkok, Thailand.

== Medalists ==
=== Men's artistic ===
Event	Gold	Silver	Bronze
Team	China; Huang Xu; Li Xiaopeng; Xing Aowei; Yang Wei; Zhang Jinjing; Zhao Sheng	South Korea; Cho Seong-min; Kim Dong-hwa; Lee Jang-hyung; Lee Joo-hyung; Yeo Hong-chul; You Won-kil	Japan; Mutsumi Harada; Akihiro Kasamatsu; Yasuhiro Ogawa; Yoshihiro Saito; Naoya Tsukahara; Isao Yoneda
Individual all-around	Huang Xu; China	Yang Wei; China	Naoya Tsukahara; Japan
Floor	Yang Wei; China	Kim Dong-hwa; South Korea	Li Xiaopeng; China
Pommel horse	Xing Aowei; China	Shared gold	Huang Xu; China
Pommel horse	Pae Gil-su; North Korea	Shared gold	Chiang Chien-tung; Chinese Taipei
Rings	Amornthep Waewsang; Thailand	Huang Xu; China	Chen Kuang-hui; Chinese Taipei
Rings	Amornthep Waewsang; Thailand	Huang Xu; China	Yoshihiro Saito; Japan
Vault	Yeo Hong-chul; South Korea	Li Xiaopeng; China	Naoya Tsukahara; Japan
Parallel bars	Li Xiaopeng; China	Zhang Jinjing; China	Shared silver
Parallel bars	Li Xiaopeng; China	Alexey Dmitriyenko; Kazakhstan	Shared silver
Parallel bars	Li Xiaopeng; China	Kim Chang-gyu; North Korea	Shared silver
Parallel bars	Li Xiaopeng; China	Jong U-chol; North Korea	Shared silver
Horizontal bar	Zhang Jinjing; China	Yoshihiro Saito; Japan	Xing Aowei; China
Horizontal bar	Zhang Jinjing; China	Yoshihiro Saito; Japan	Lee Joo-hyung; South Korea

=== Women's artistic ===
Event	Gold	Silver	Bronze
Team	China; Bi Wenjing; Kui Yuanyuan; Ling Jie; Liu Xuan; Meng Fei; Xu Jing	Japan; Miho Hashiguchi; Ayako Kitamura; Yuki Ohata; Eri Okumoto; Risa Sugawara; Satomi Yamamoto	Kazakhstan; Olga Kozhevnikova; Olga Nuraliyeva; Oxana Yemelyanova; Irina Yevdokimova; Inna Zhuravleva
Individual all-around	Liu Xuan; China	Irina Yevdokimova; Kazakhstan	Risa Sugawara; Japan
Vault	Kui Yuanyuan; China	Svetlana Bakhridinova; Uzbekistan	Xu Jing; China
Vault	Kui Yuanyuan; China	Svetlana Bakhridinova; Uzbekistan	Irina Yevdokimova; Kazakhstan
Uneven bars	Bi Wenjing; China	Kang Sun-yong; North Korea	Yuki Ohata; Japan
Balance beam	Liu Xuan; China	Meng Fei; China	Olga Kozhevnikova; Kazakhstan
Floor	Xu Jing; China	Kui Yuanyuan; China	Risa Sugawara; Japan
Floor	Xu Jing; China	Kui Yuanyuan; China	Irina Yevdokimova; Kazakhstan

=== Rhythmic ===
Event	Gold	Silver	Bronze
Team	China; Dong Weihua; Pu Yunfei; Wang Weixiao; Zhou Xiaojing	Japan; Mikako Iwamoto; Rieko Matsunaga; Yukari Murata	South Korea; Cho Eun-jung; Choi Ye-lim; Kim Eun-hae; Kim Min-jung
Individual all-around	Zhou Xiaojing; China	Yun Myong-ran; North Korea	Wang Weixiao; China

== Medal table ==
Rank	Nation	Gold	Silver	Bronze	Total
1	China (CHN)	14	6	5	25
2	North Korea (PRK)	1	4	0	5
3	South Korea (KOR)	1	2	2	5
4	Thailand (THA)	1	0	0	1
5	Japan (JPN)	0	3	7	10
6	Kazakhstan (KAZ)	0	2	4	6
7	Uzbekistan (UZB)	0	1	0	1
8	Chinese Taipei (TPE)	0	0	2	2
Totals (8 entries)		17	18	20	55
