= Gymnastics at the 1990 Asian Games =

- Venue: Capital Indoor Stadium
- Dates: 23–26 September 1990

Gymnastics was contested at the 1990 Asian Games, held in Beijing, China from September 23, 1990, to September 26, 1990. Only artistic events were contested.

== Medalists ==
=== Men ===
Event	Gold	Silver	Bronze
Team	China; Guo Linyao; Li Chunyang; Li Ge; Li Jing; Li Xiaoshuang; Qiao Liang	Japan; Yutaka Aihara; Yoshiaki Hatakeda; Yukio Iketani; Masayuki Matsunaga; Daisuke Nishikawa; Toshiharu Sato	South Korea; Jung Jin-soo; Kang Boung-eui; Kim Jong-soo; Lee Joo-hyung; Yoo Ok-ryul; Yoon Chang-seon
Individual all-around	Li Jing; China	Guo Linyao; China	Li Xiaoshuang; China
Floor	Li Xiaoshuang; China	Li Chunyang; China	Sin Myong-su; North Korea
Pommel horse	Guo Linyao; China	Li Jing; China	Pae Gil-su; North Korea
Pommel horse	Guo Linyao; China	Li Jing; China	Chang Feng-chih; Chinese Taipei
Rings	Li Ge; China	Li Chunyang; China	Sin Myong-su; North Korea
Rings	Li Ge; China	Li Chunyang; China	Masayuki Matsunaga; Japan
Vault	Li Jing; China	Lee Joo-hyung; South Korea	Chang Feng-chih; Chinese Taipei
Parallel bars	Guo Linyao; China	Shared gold	Li Jing; China
Parallel bars	Lee Joo-hyung; South Korea	Shared gold	Toshiharu Sato; Japan
Horizontal bar	Pae Gil-su; North Korea	Yukio Iketani; Japan	Yoshiaki Hatakeda; Japan

=== Women ===
Event	Gold	Silver	Bronze
Team	China; Chen Cuiting; Fan Di; Li Li; Li Yifang; Yang Bo; Zhang Wenning	North Korea; An Myong-hwa; Choi Gyong-hui; Hwang Bo-sil; Kim Gwang-suk; Om Song-hui; Ri Chun-mi	South Korea; Bae Eun-mi; Cho Eun-jin; Han Na-jung; Lee Hee-kyung; Min A-young; Park Ji-sook
Individual all-around	Chen Cuiting; China	Li Yifang; China	Kim Gwang-suk; North Korea
Vault	Kyoko Seo; Japan	Chen Cuiting; China	Park Ji-sook; South Korea
Uneven bars	Fan Di; China	Li Li; China	Shared silver
Uneven bars	Fan Di; China	Kim Gwang-suk; North Korea	Shared silver
Balance beam	Ri Chun-mi; North Korea	Li Yifang; China	Yang Bo; China
Floor	Chen Cuiting; China	Mari Kosuge; Japan	Shared silver
Floor	Chen Cuiting; China	Lee Hee-kyung; South Korea	Shared silver

== Medal table ==
Rank	Nation	Gold	Silver	Bronze	Total
1	China (CHN)	11	8	3	22
2	North Korea (PRK)	2	2	4	8
3	Japan (JPN)	1	3	3	7
4	South Korea (KOR)	1	2	3	6
5	Chinese Taipei (TPE)	0	0	2	2
Totals (5 entries)		15	15	15	45
