= Gymnastics at the 1982 Asian Games =

- Venue: Indraprashtha Indoor Stadium
- Dates: 21–24 November 1982

Gymnastics was contested at the 1982 Asian Games, held in New Delhi, India from 21 November 1982 to 24 November 1982. Only artistic events were contested.

== Medalists ==
=== Men ===
Event	Gold	Silver	Bronze
Team	China; Huang Yubin; Li Ning; Li Xiaoping; Li Yuejiu; Lou Yun; Tong Fei	Japan; Koji Gushiken; Noritoshi Hirata; Nobuyuki Kajitani; Shinji Morisue; Taichi Okada; Koji Sotomura	North Korea; Han Gwang-song; Ri Chol-hon; Ri Gil-su; Ri Gun-sun; Ri Su-gil; Sin Gwi-dok
Individual all-around	Li Ning; China	Tong Fei; China	Ri Chol-hon; North Korea
Floor	Tong Fei; China	Li Yuejiu; China	Shared silver
Floor	Tong Fei; China	Ri Chol-hon; North Korea	Shared silver
Pommel horse	Ri Chol-hon; North Korea	Shared gold	Shared gold
Pommel horse	Li Ning; China	Shared gold	Shared gold
Pommel horse	Li Xiaoping; China	Shared gold	Shared gold
Rings	Li Ning; China	Shared gold	Huang Yubin; China
Rings	Ri Su-gil; North Korea	Shared gold	Huang Yubin; China
Vault	Lou Yun; China	Koji Gushiken; Japan	Ra Kwon; South Korea
Vault	Lou Yun; China	Koji Gushiken; Japan	Ri Gil-su; North Korea
Parallel bars	Koji Gushiken; Japan	Ri Chol-hon; North Korea	Shared silver
Parallel bars	Koji Gushiken; Japan	Tong Fei; China	Shared silver
Parallel bars	Koji Gushiken; Japan	Li Ning; China	Shared silver
Horizontal bar	Noritoshi Hirata; Japan	Shinji Morisue; Japan	Tong Fei; China

=== Women ===
Event	Gold	Silver	Bronze
Team	China; Chen Yongyan; Li Cuiling; Wen Jia; Wu Jiani; Xiang Yu; Yang Yanli	North Korea; Choe Jong-sil; Choe Mil-hyang; Choe Myong-hui; Choe Sun-sil; Ri Sun-ok; Ri Yong-ae	Japan; Kanae Abe; Yayoi Kano; Maiko Morio; Kazumi Nagayama; Katsura Uchida; Kiyomi Ueda
Individual all-around	Chen Yongyan; China	Wu Jiani; China	Choe Jong-sil; North Korea
Vault	Li Cuiling; China	Chen Yongyan; China	Lee Jung-hee; South Korea
Uneven bars	Wu Jiani; China	Choe Jong-sil; North Korea	Shared silver
Uneven bars	Wu Jiani; China	Ri Yong-ae; North Korea	Shared silver
Balance beam	Wu Jiani; China	Xiang Yu; China	Maiko Morio; Japan
Floor	Choe Jong-sil; North Korea	Wu Jiani; China	Shared silver
Floor	Choe Jong-sil; North Korea	Wen Jia; China	Shared silver

== Medal table ==
Rank	Nation	Gold	Silver	Bronze	Total
1	China (CHN)	12	9	2	23
2	North Korea (PRK)	3	5	4	12
3	Japan (JPN)	2	3	2	7
4	South Korea (KOR)	0	0	2	2
Totals (4 entries)		17	17	10	44
