= Gymnastics at the 1994 Asian Games =

Asian Games event

- Venue: Hiroshima Sun Plaza
- Dates: 3–10 October 1994

Gymnastics was contested at the 1994 Asian Games in Hiroshima Sun Plaza, Hiroshima, Japan. Artistic gymnastics took place from October 3 to October 6. Rhythmic gymnastics took place on October 9 and 10.

== Medalists ==
=== Men's artistic ===
Event	Gold	Silver	Bronze
Team	China; Fan Hongbin; Guo Linyao; Huang Huadong; Huang Liping; Li Dashuang; Li Jing; Li Xiaoshuang	South Korea; Han Kwang-ho; Han Yoon-soo; Jung Jin-soo; Lee Jang-hyung; Lee Joo-hyung; Yeo Hong-chul; Yoo Ok-ryul	Japan; Takashi Chinen; Yoshiaki Hatakeda; Horimasa Masuda; Masayuki Matsunaga; Daisuke Nishikawa; Toshiharu Sato; Hikaru Tanaka
Individual all-around	Li Xiaoshuang; China	Huang Liping; China	Yoshiaki Hatakeda; Japan
Floor	Li Xiaoshuang; China	Sergey Fedorchenko; Kazakhstan	Toshiharu Sato; Japan
Pommel horse	Yoshiaki Hatakeda; Japan	Shared gold	Shared gold
Pommel horse	Huang Huadong; China	Shared gold	Shared gold
Pommel horse	Lee Jang-hyung; South Korea	Shared gold	Shared gold
Rings	Fan Hongbin; China	Yoo Ok-ryul; South Korea	Shared silver
Rings	Fan Hongbin; China	Li Xiaoshuang; China	Shared silver
Vault	Yeo Hong-chul; South Korea	Li Dashuang; China	Li Xiaoshuang; China
Vault	Yeo Hong-chul; South Korea	Li Dashuang; China	Lee Joo-hyung; South Korea
Parallel bars	Huang Liping; China	Jung Jin-soo; South Korea	Li Xiaoshuang; China
Horizontal bar	Li Jing; China	Huang Liping; China	Sergey Fedorchenko; Kazakhstan

=== Women's artistic ===
Event	Gold	Silver	Bronze
Team	China; He Xuemei; Liu Xuan; Mo Huilan; Qiao Ya; Wang Xin; Ye Linlin; Yuan Kexia	Japan; Yuka Arai; Mari Kosuge; Hanako Miura; Satsuki Obata; Masumi Okawa; Aya Sekine; Risa Sugawara	South Korea; Han Na-jung; Hu So-young; Ji Hae-sung; Kim Yoon-ji; Oh Eun-mi; Park Ji-young; Park Joo-young
Individual all-around	Qiao Ya; China	Yuan Kexia; China	Mo Huilan; China
Vault	Mo Huilan; China	Ye Linlin; China	Oksana Chusovitina; Uzbekistan
Uneven bars	Mo Huilan; China	Liu Xuan; China	Oksana Chusovitina; Uzbekistan
Balance beam	Mo Huilan; China	Qiao Ya; China	Irina Yevdokimova; Kazakhstan
Floor	Mo Huilan; China	Ye Linlin; China	Irina Yevdokimova; Kazakhstan

=== Rhythmic ===
Event	Gold	Silver	Bronze
Individual all-around	Yukari Kawamoto; Japan	Zhou Xiaojing; China	Miho Yamada; Japan

== Medal table ==
Rank	Nation	Gold	Silver	Bronze	Total
1	China (CHN)	13	10	3	26
2	South Korea (KOR)	2	3	2	7
3	Japan (JPN)	2	1	4	7
4	Kazakhstan (KAZ)	0	1	3	4
5	Uzbekistan (UZB)	0	0	2	2
Totals (5 entries)		17	15	14	46
