= Myung-ok =

Korean given name (명옥)

- Hangul: 명옥
- RR: Myeongok
- MR: Myŏngok

Myung-ok, also spelled Myong-ok, is a Korean given name.

People with this name include:

- Marie Myung-Ok Lee (born 1964), American writer of Korean descent
- Kim Myung-ok (born 1972), South Korean field hockey player
- Yim Myung-ok (born 1986), South Korean volleyball player
- An Myong-ok, North Korean politician
- Sin Myong-ok, North Korean gymnast; see list of Asian Games medalists in gymnastics

== See also ==
- List of Korean given names
