= 1998 FIG Artistic Gymnastics World Cup final =

International gymnastics competition

The 1998 Artistic Gymnastics World Cup Final was held in Sabae, Japan in 1998. This edition marked the first time the World Cup Final was held. In 1997, the World Cup was revived, after a 7-year hiatus, as a series of qualifying events for a period of two years, culminating in a final event, the World Cup Final. The different stages, sometimes referred to as World Cup Qualifiers, mostly served the purpose of awarding points to individual gymnasts and groups according to their placements. These points would be added up over the two-year period to qualify a limited number of athletes to the biennial World Cup Final event.

== Medal winners ==
Event	Gold	Silver	Bronze	Ref.
Men's floor exercise	(China) Li Xiaopeng	(Russia) Aleksei Nemov	(Japan) Isao Yoneda	
Men's pommel horse	(France) Eric Poujade (Romania) Marius Urzică (China) Zhang Jingjin	None awarded	None awarded	
Men's still rings	(Hungary) Szilveszter Csollány	(Belarus) Ivan Ivankov	(Japan) Shigeru Kurihara	
Men's vault	(Russia) Aleksei Nemov	(Russia) Aleksei Bondarenko	(Kazakhstan) Sergei Fedorchenko	
Men's parallel bars	(Kazakhstan) Aleksey Dmitrienko (China) Li Xiaopeng (China) Zhang Jingjin	None awarded	None awarded	
Men's horizontal bar	(Belarus) Ivan Ivankov	(Kazakhstan) Sergei Fedorchenko	(Hungary) Zoltán Supola	
Women's vault	(Romania) Simona Amânar	(Romania) Gina Gogean	(China) Kui Yuanyuan	
Women's uneven bars	(China) Bi Wenjing	(Russia) Svetlana Khorkina	(China) Liu Xuan	
Women's balance beam	(China) Liu Xuan	(China) Kui Yuanyuan	(Romania) Gina Gogean	
Women's floor exercise	(Romania) Simona Amânar	(Romania) Gina Gogean	(Belarus) Alena Polozkova	
