= Gymnastics at the 1986 Asian Games =

- Venue: Olympic Gymnastics Arena
- Dates: 21–24 September 1986

Gymnastics was contested at the 1986 Asian Games, held in Seoul, South Korea from September 21, 1986, to September 24, 1986. Only artistic events were contested.

== Medalists ==
=== Men ===
Event	Gold	Silver	Bronze
Team	China; Guo Linsheng; Li Ning; Lou Yun; Wang Chongsheng; Xu Zhiqiang; Yang Yueshan	South Korea; Han Chung-sik; Joo Young-sam; Kwon Soon-seong; Lee Jeong-sik; Park Jong-hoon; Yoon Chang-seon	Japan; Yukihiro Hayase; Hiroyuki Konishi; Koichi Mizushima; Hiroaki Okabe; Koji Sotomura; Kyoji Yamawaki
Individual all-around	Li Ning; China	Yang Yueshan; China	Lou Yun; China
Floor	Li Ning; China	Yang Yueshan; China	Park Jong-hoon; South Korea
Pommel horse	Yang Yueshan; China	Li Ning; China	Joo Young-sam; South Korea
Rings	Li Ning; China	Kwon Soon-seong; South Korea	Lou Yun; China
Vault	Lou Yun; China	Kyoji Yamawaki; Japan	Park Jong-hoon; South Korea
Parallel bars	Kwon Soon-seong; South Korea	Park Jong-hoon; South Korea	Koichi Mizushima; Japan
Parallel bars	Kwon Soon-seong; South Korea	Park Jong-hoon; South Korea	Lou Yun; China
Horizontal bar	Yang Yueshan; China	Li Ning; China	Yukihiro Hayase; Japan

=== Women ===
Event	Gold	Silver	Bronze
Team	China; Chen Cuiting; Huang Qun; Ma Ying; Qin Qizhi; Wang Huiying; Yu Feng	South Korea; Han Kyung-im; Jeon Hea-ryung; Seo Seon-ang; Seo Yeon-hee; Shim Jae-young; Suk Soo-kwang	Japan; Asako Inoue; Noriko Mochizuki; Maiko Morio; Tomoko Okabe; Sawako Wada; Yoko Yamanaka
Individual all-around	Chen Cuiting; China	Huang Qun; China	Yu Feng; China
Vault	Ma Ying; China	Chen Cuiting; China	Suk Soo-kwang; South Korea
Uneven bars	Huang Qun; China	Shared gold	Yu Feng; China
Uneven bars	Seo Yeon-hee; South Korea	Shared gold	Yu Feng; China
Balance beam	Seo Seon-ang; South Korea	Huang Qun; China	Han Kyung-im; South Korea
Floor	Chen Cuiting; China	Yu Feng; China	Shim Jae-young; South Korea

== Medal table ==
Rank	Nation	Gold	Silver	Bronze	Total
1	China (CHN)	12	8	5	25
2	South Korea (KOR)	3	4	6	13
3	Japan (JPN)	0	1	4	5
Totals (3 entries)		15	13	15	43
