= Gymnastics at the 2000 Summer Olympics – Men's parallel bars =

Men's parallel bars at the Games of the XXVII Olympiad
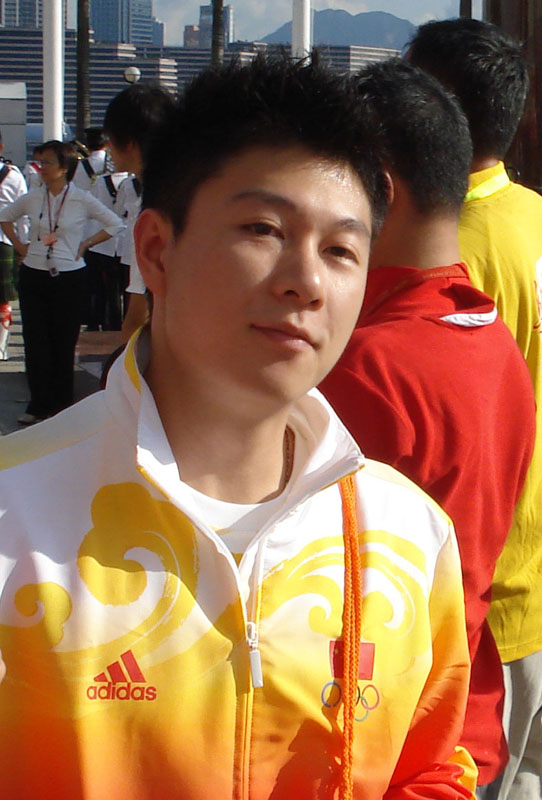
- Li Xiaopeng (2008)
- Venue: Sydney Super Dome
- Dates: 16 September 2000 (qualifying); 25 September 2000 (final)
- Competitors: 81 from 30 nations
- Winning score: 9.825

Medalists
1st place, gold medalist(s)		Li Xiaopeng; China
2nd place, silver medalist(s)		Lee Joo-Hyung; South Korea
3rd place, bronze medalist(s)		Alexei Nemov; Russia

The men's parallel bars competition was one of eight events for male competitors in artistic gymnastics at the 2000 Summer Olympics in Sydney. The qualification and final rounds took place on September 16 and 25 at the Sydney Super Dome. There were 81 competitors from 30 nations; nations competing in the team event could have up to 5 gymnasts in the vault, while other nations could have up to 2 gymnasts. The event was won by Li Xiaopeng of China, the nation's first victory in the parallel bars. Lee Joo-Hyung earned South Korea's first medal in the event with his silver. Russia also received its first medal since the dissolution of the Soviet Union, with Alexei Nemov's bronze.

== Background ==
This was the 20th appearance of the event, which is one of the five apparatus events held every time there were apparatus events at the Summer Olympics (no apparatus events were held in 1900, 1908, 1912, or 1920). Two of the eight finalists from 1996 returned: fourth-place finisher Alexei Nemov of Russia and seventh-place finisher Lee Joo-Hyung of South Korea. Lee was also the reigning (1999) world champion.

Latvia made its debut in the men's parallel bars. The United States made its 18th appearance, most of any nation; the Americans had missed only the inaugural 1896 event and the boycotted 1980 Games.

== Competition format ==
The 1996 gymnastics competition had introduced the "7–6–5" format, in which each team had 7 members, designated 6 for each apparatus, and had 5 count for team scores. In 2000, this was reduced across the board to a "6–5–4" format. Further, while in 1996 all 7 team members could compete on each apparatus for individual purposes, in 2000 only the 5 designated for that apparatus competed. The 2000 competition also eliminated the compulsory exercises; only voluntary exercises were done on each apparatus. The qualifying round scores were used for qualification for the team all-around, individual all-around, and apparatus finals.

The top eight gymnasts, with a limit of two per nation, advanced to the final. Non-finalists were ranked 9th through 81st based on preliminary score. The preliminary score had no effect on the final; once the eight finalists were selected, their ranking depended only on the final exercise.

== Schedule ==
All times are Australian Eastern Standard Time (UTC+10)

Date	Time	Round
Saturday, 16 September 2000		Qualifying
Monday, 25 September 2000	16:45	Final

== Results ==
=== Qualifying ===
Eighty-one gymnasts competed in the parallel bars event during the qualification round on September 16. The eight highest scoring gymnasts advanced to the final on September 25. Each country was limited to two competitors in the final.

=== Final ===
Rank	Gymnast	Nation	Score
1st place, gold medalist(s)	Li Xiaopeng	China	9.825
2nd place, silver medalist(s)	Lee Joo-Hyung	South Korea	9.812
3rd place, bronze medalist(s)	Alexei Nemov	Russia	9.800
4	Jung Jin-Soo	South Korea	9.787
5	Ivan Ivankov	Belarus	9.775
6	Yann Cucherat	France	9.725
7	Huang Xu	China	9.650
8	Marius Urzică	Romania	8.887
