= Teruichi =

- Gender: Male

Origin
- Word/name: Japanese
- Meaning: Different meanings depending on the kanji used

Teruichi (written: 輝一 or 照市 is a masculine Japanese given name. Notable people with the name include:

- Teruichi Aono (青野 照市, born 1953), Japanese shogi player
- Teruichi Okamura (岡村 輝一, born 1948), Japanese gymnast
