= Myung-hwa =

- Hangul: 명화
- RR: Myeonghwa
- MR: Myŏnghwa

Myung-hwa, also spelled Myong-hwa, is a Korean given name.

== People ==
People with this name include:

- Myung-wha Chung (born 1944), South Korean cellist
- Kim Myong-hwa (born 1967, North Korean sport shooter, competed in the women's skeet event at the 2000 Summer Olympics
- Lee Myung-hwa (born 1973), South Korean football forward
- Jon Myong-hwa (born 1993), North Korean football midfielder, competed at the 2012 Summer Olympics
- An Myong-hwa, North Korean gymnast, competed in Gymnastics at the 1992 Summer Olympics – Women's artistic team all-around
- Choe Myong-hwa, North Korean diver, competed in Diving at the 2000 Summer Olympics – Women's 10 metre platform
- Kim Myung-wha, (born 1982) renamed Blair Seifert - South Korean born North American DJ and artist

== See also ==
- List of Korean given names
