= Gymnastics at the 1996 Summer Olympics – Women's uneven bars =

Women's uneven bars at the Games of the XXVI Olympiad
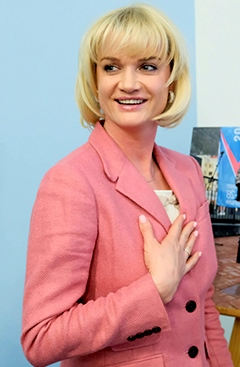
- Gold medalist Svetlana Khorkina (2017)

Medalists
1st place, gold medalist(s)		Svetlana Khorkina	Russia
2nd place, silver medalist(s)		Amy Chow	United States
2nd place, silver medalist(s)		Bi Wenjing	China

These are the results of the women's uneven bars competition, one of six events for female competitors in artistic gymnastics at the 1996 Summer Olympics in Atlanta. The qualification and final rounds took place on July 21, 23 and 28th at the Georgia Dome.

== Results ==
=== Qualification ===
Eighty-nine gymnasts competed in the uneven bars event during the compulsory and optional rounds on July 21 and 23. The eight highest scoring gymnasts advanced to the final on July 28. Each country was limited to two competitors in the final.

Rank	Gymnast	Score
1	Simona Amânar (ROU)	19.675
2	Svetlana Khorkina (RUS)	19.662
2	Lilia Podkopayeva (UKR)	19.662
4	Dina Kochetkova (RUS)	19.625
5	Dominique Dawes (USA)	19.612
6	Amy Chow (USA)	19.599
7	Lavinia Miloșovici (ROU)	19.587
8	Bi Wenjing (CHN)	19.575

=== Final ===
The 1996 Summer Olympics in Atlanta was also the last games to allow awarding of joint medals for identical scores in artistic gymnastics as there were no tie-breaking rules established yet by the International Gymnastics Federation at the time to separate gymnasts who tied with the same scores.

Rank	Gymnast	Order	J1 (South Korea)	J2 (Belarus)	J3 (Netherlands)	J4 (Belgium)	J5 (Italy)	J6 (Bulgaria)	Total
Gold medal	Svetlana Khorkina (RUS)	5	9.85	9.85	9.85	9.85	9.85	9.90	9.850
Silver medal	Amy Chow (USA)	7	9.85	9.80	9.80	9.90	9.85	9.85	9.837
Silver medal	Bi Wenjing (CHN)	8	9.85	9.80	9.75	9.85	9.90	9.85	9.837
4	Dominique Dawes (USA)	4	9.80	9.80	9.80	9.80	9.75	9.85	9.800
5	Simona Amânar (ROU)	6	9.80	9.75	9.70	9.80	9.80	9.80	9.787
5	Dina Kochetkova (RUS)	3	9.75	9.80	9.80	9.85	9.75	9.80	9.787
5	Lilia Podkopayeva (UKR)	1	9.75	9.80	9.75	9.80	9.80	9.80	9.787
8	Lavinia Miloșovici (ROU)	2	9.80	9.70	9.70	9.80	9.75	9.75	9.750
