= Marcia Frederick =

American artistic gymnast

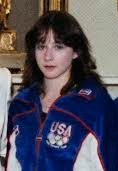
- Frederick in 1981

Personal information
- Born: January 4, 1963 (age 63) Springfield, Massachusetts, United States

Gymnastics career
- Discipline: Women's artistic gymnastics
- Country represented: United States
- Head coaches: Muriel Grossfeld, Don Peters
Medal record
Women's artistic gymnastics
Representing the United States
World Championships
Gold medal – first place	1978 Strasbourg	Uneven Bars

Marcia Frederick (born January 4, 1963, in Springfield, Massachusetts) is a retired American artistic gymnast who was the first American woman to win a gold medal at the World Gymnastics Championships.

== Career ==
Frederick began gymnastics at age 9; she sprained her ankle playing dodgeball and taught herself to walk on her hands instead. Afterward, she began taking classes. At age 12, she won the state championships and came to the attention of Muriel Grossfeld, who along with Don Peters ran a gym and dorm in Milford, Connecticut that Frederick moved to.

Despite an ankle injury that limited how much she could train, she won gold on the uneven bars in Strasbourg, France, at the 1978 World Championships, over gymnasts like Elena Mukhina and Nadia Comăneci. This made her the first American world champion in women's gymnastics. She performed a new move during her routine that was named after her.

She later said, "I always see the glass-is-half-full view of things, so I went into that competition believing I could win. When I got to see what I was up against, I certainly gained an inner level of aggression." Her victory was a significant step for the rising American gymnastics program.

After the World Championships, Peters left the gym. Frederick later said that she witnessed Peters sexually abusing another gymnast in 1977. A new coach named Richard Carlson joined the gym and began to coach her, and Frederick alleged that he began to sexually abuse her in 1979.

In 1979, Frederick competed at the 1979 World Championships in Fort Worth, Texas. Frederick struggled in the competition, earning a 9.90 in the compulsory uneven bars routine, but 9.70 in the optional set after touching a hand down after her dismount. She finished 6th in the uneven bars final and 23rd in the all-around, which she attributed to the mental effects of her ongoing abuse.

After qualifying for the 1980 US Olympic team, she was among the favorites to win a medal in Moscow but did not compete because of the boycott of the 1980 Summer Olympics led by the United States. Frederick said that she was furious about the news of the boycott, and her anger caused her to decide to end Carlson's abuse of her. She informed her parents and Grossman and reported Carlson, and she would later report him again in 2015 in the wake of the USA Gymnastics sex abuse scandal. He was banned from USA Gymnastics in June 2018.

At the USGF International Invitational held in August 1980 in Hartford, Connecticut, for countries affected by the boycott, Frederick won the silver medal in the all-around competition, the gold on vault and bronze on uneven bars and balance beam; she debuted another new uneven bars move at the competition. Years later, she was one of 461 athletes to receive a Congressional Gold Medal.

In early 1981, she was in a serious car accident but was able to compete six weeks later. Afterward, however, she decided to finish her competitive career. She participated in Kurt Thomas's professional tour before retiring from gymnastics in February 1982.

== Personal life ==
Frederick has worked as a gymnastics coach, personal trainer, and aerobics instructor. In 1984, she was a stunt double in Nadia, a television film about Nadia Comăneci. She has two children.

== Eponymous skill ==
Frederick has one eponymous skill listed in the Code of Points.

Apparatus	Name	Description	Difficulty (Note: Valid for the 2025–2028 Code of Points)
Uneven bars	Frederick	Stalder backward with 1/1 turn (360°) in handstand phase	D (0.4)
