= 1996 Asian Rhythmic Gymnastics Championships =

International rhythmic gymnastics competition

The 1996 Asian Rhythmic Gymnastics Championships was held in Changsha, China, 24-30 September 1996.

== Medal winners ==
Event	Gold	Silver	Bronze
Team
Team	Japan; Miho Yamada; Akane Yamao; Yukari Murata	China; Wu Bei; Zhou Xiaojing	South Korea; Kim Min-jung; Kim Eun-hye; Kwon Bo-young
Individual
All-around	Zhou Xiaojing; China	Miho Yamada; Japan	Akane Yamao; Japan
Rope	Zhou Xiaojing; China	Miho Yamada; Japan	Akane Yamao; Japan
Ball	Zhou Xiaojing; China	Unknown	Akane Yamao; Japan
Clubs	Unknown	Unknown	Akane Yamao; Japan
Ribbon	Akane Yamao; Japan	Unknown	Unknown
Group
All-around	Japan	China	South Korea
Group 5 hoops	Unknown	Japan	Unknown
Group 3 balls + 2 ribbons	Unknown	Japan	Unknown
