= Akane Yamao =

Japanese rhythmic gymnast

- Born: September 30, 1974 (age 51) Kiyose, Tokyo, Japan
- Height: 164 cm (5 ft 5 in) (at the 1996 Olympics)

Gymnastics career
- Discipline: Rhythmic gymnastics
- Country represented: Japan
- Club: Tokyo Women's Physical School
Medal record
Rhythmic Gymnastics
Representing Japan
Asian Championships
Gold medal – first place	1996 Changsha	Team
Gold medal – first place	1996 Changsha	Ribbon
Bronze medal – third place	1996 Changsha	All-around
Bronze medal – third place	1996 Changsha	Rope
Bronze medal – third place	1996 Changsha	Ball
Bronze medal – third place	1996 Changsha	Clubs

Akane Yamao (Japanese: 山尾 朱子, born September 30, 1974, Kiyose, Tokyo) is a Japanese rhythmic gymnast.

Yamao competed for Japan in the rhythmic gymnastics individual all-around competition at the 1996 Summer Olympics in Atlanta. There she was 19th in the qualification round and advanced to the semifinal, where she placed 18th and did not advance to the final of 10 competitors.
