= Miho Yamada (gymnast) =

Japanese rhythmic gymnast

- Born: June 21, 1973 (age 53) Chofu, Tokyo, Japan
- Height: 164 cm (5 ft 5 in)

Gymnastics career
- Discipline: Rhythmic gymnastics
- Country represented: Japan
- Club: Jusco Co. Ltd.
Medal record
Rhythmic gymnastics
Representing Japan
Four Continents Championships
Gold medal – first place	1994 Seoul	All-around
Asian Games
Bronze medal – third place	1994 Hiroshima	All-Around
Asian Championships
Gold medal – first place	1996 Changsha	Team
Silver medal – second place	1996 Changsha	All-around
Silver medal – second place	1996 Changsha	Rope

Miho Yamada (Japanese: 山田 海蜂, born June 21, 1973, Chofu, Tokyo) is a retired Japanese rhythmic gymnast.

She competed for Japan in the individual rhythmic gymnastics all-around competition at two Olympic Games: in 1992 in Barcelona and in 1996 in Atlanta. In 1992 was 18th in the qualification round and didn't advance to the final. In 1996 she again was 18th in the qualification round and advanced to the semifinal. In the semifinal she placed 20th of 20, not advancing to the final.
