= USGF International Invitational 1980 =

International gymnastics tournament

The USGF International Invitational was a gymnastics tournament organized by the U.S. Gymnastics Federation (USGF) in Hartford, Connecticut as part of the U.S.-led 1980 Olympic boycott. Competitors were invited from nations not competing in the 1980 Olympic tournament in Moscow. Participants came from Japan, China, the USA, Switzerland, West Germany, Italy, Norway, Korea, Canada, New Zealand and Israel. Similar events in other Olympic sports included the Liberty Bell Classic in athletics.

== Results ==
=== Men's Events ===
Event	Gold		Silver		Bronze	
Individual all-around	Nobuyuki Kajitani (JPN)	58.30	Li Yuejiu (CHN); Tong Fei (CHN)	58.20	none awarded	–
Floor	Li Yuejiu (CHN)	19.800	Tong Fei (CHN)	19.550	Ron Galimore (USA)	19.500
Pommel horse	Tong Fei (CHN)	19.450	Huang Yubin (CHN)	19.350	Kyoji Yamawaki (URS)	19.300
Vault	Ron Galimore (USA)	19.800	Kyoji Yamawaki (JPN)	19.550	Tong Fei (CHN)	19.475
Rings	Nobuyuki Kajitani (JPN)	19.600	Kyoji Yamawaki (JPN)	19.550	Ron Galimore (USA)	19.500
Parallel bars	Cai Huanzong (CHN)	19.750	Nobuyuki Kajitani (JPN)	19.650	Li Yuejiu (CHN)	19.450
Horizontal bar	Junichi Kitagawa (JPN)	19.600	Tong Fei (CHN)	19.550	Mitch Gaylord (USA)	19.500

=== Women's events ===
Event	Gold		Silver		Bronze	
Individual all-around	Li Cuiling (CHN)	38.800	Marcia Frederick (USA)	38.600	Chen Yongyan (CHN)	38.350
Vault	Marcia Frederick (USA)	19.175	Li Cuiling (CHN)	19.025	Lisa Zeis (USA)	19.000
Uneven bars	Zhu Zheng (CHN)	19.600	Chen Yongyan (CHN)	19.500	Marcia Frederick (USA)	18.950
Balance beam	Ma Yanhong (CHN)	19.700	Li Cuiling (CHN)	19.300	Marcia Frederick (USA)	18.950
Floor	Wen Jia (CHN)	19.750	Lynne Lederer (USA)	19.650	Kelly Garrison (USA)	19.450

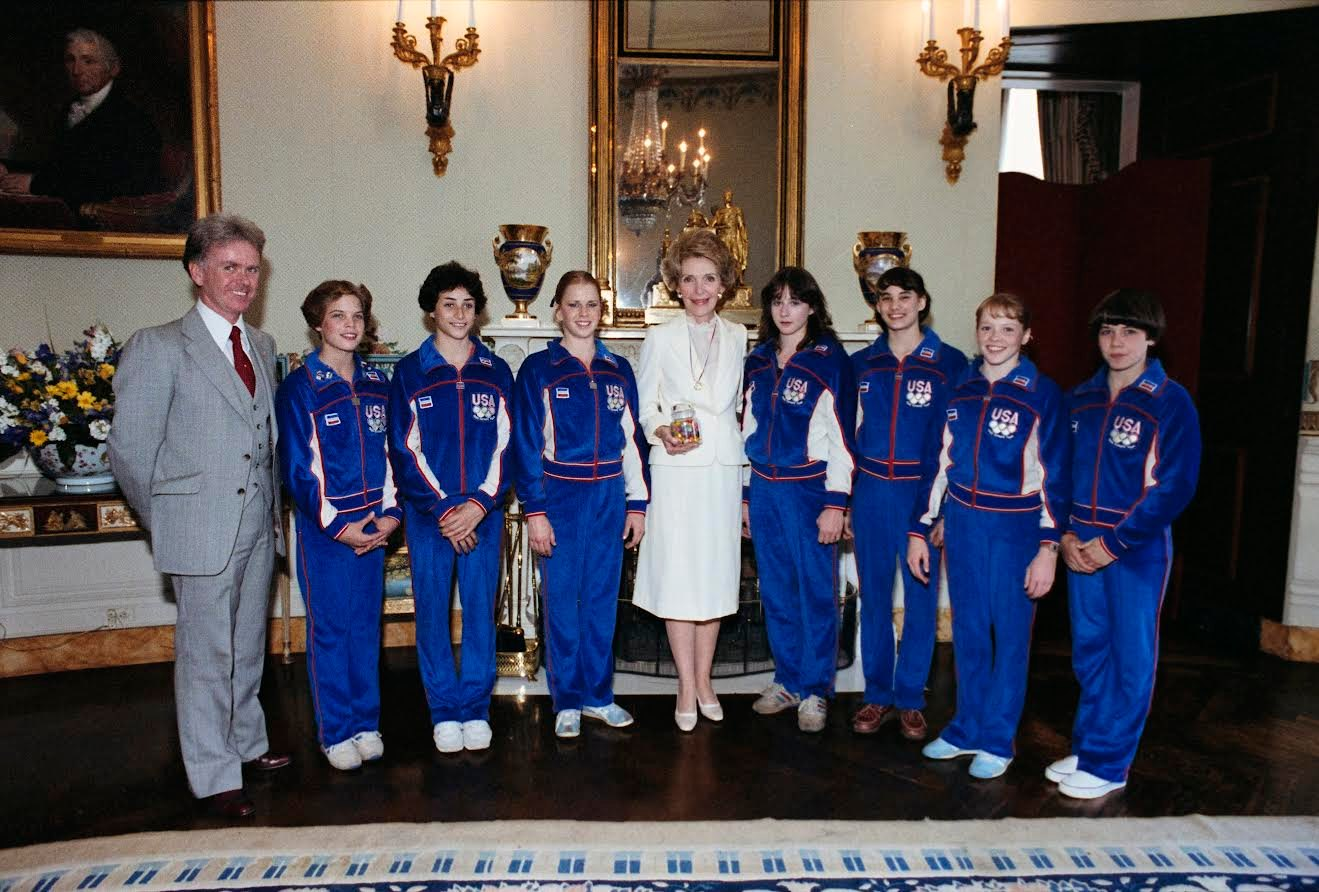
US women's team posing with Nancy Reagan in 1981

== See also ==
- Gymnastics at the Friendship Games, similar event as part of the 1984 Soviet-led Olympic boycott
