= Zhou Xiaojing =

Chinese rhythmic gymnast

- Born: August 10, 1977 (age 49) Ruian, Zhejiang, China
- Height: 167 cm (5 ft 6 in)

Gymnastics career
- Discipline: Rhythmic gymnastics
- Country represented: China
Medal record
Representing China
Four Continents Championships
Silver medal – second place	1994 Seoul	All-around
Silver medal – second place	1995 Cairo	All-around
Bronze medal – third place	1997 Sydney	All-around
Asian Games
Gold medal – first place	1998 Bangkok	All-Around
Gold medal – first place	1998 Bangkok	Team
Silver medal – second place	1994 Hiroshima	All-Around
Asian Championships
Gold medal – first place	1996 Changsha	All-Around
Gold medal – first place	1996 Changsha	Rope
Gold medal – first place	1996 Changsha	Ball
Silver medal – second place	1996 Changsha	Team

Zhou Xiaojing (Chinese: 周 小菁; born August 10, 1977) is a Chinese rhythmic gymnast.

Zhou represented China in the rhythmic gymnastics individual all-around competition at two Summer Olympic Games: in 1996 in Atlanta and in 2000 in Sydney. In 1996, she tied for 16th place in the qualification round and advanced to the semifinal, where she placed 17th and did not advance to the final of 10 competitors. In 2000, she was 20th in the qualification and did not advance to the final.
