= Kui Yuanyuan =

Chinese artistic gymnast

- Born: June 23, 1981 (age 45) Xicheng District, Beijing, China

Gymnastics career
- Discipline: Women's artistic gymnastics
- Country represented: China
- Retired: 2000
Medal record
Women's artistic gymnastics
Representing China
World Championships
Gold medal – first place	1996 Puerto Rico	Floor Exercise
Bronze medal – third place	1997 Lausanne	Team
Bronze medal – third place	1997 Lausanne	Balance Beam
World Cup Final
Silver medal – second place	1998 Sabae	Balance Beam
Bronze medal – third place	1998 Sabae	Vault
Asian Games
Gold medal – first place	1998 Bangkok	Team
Gold medal – first place	1998 Bangkok	Vault
Silver medal – second place	1998 Bangkok	Floor Exercise
National Games
Gold medal – first place	1997 Shanghai	All-Around
Gold medal – first place	1997 Shanghai	Floor Exercise
Silver medal – second place	1997 Shanghai	Team
Bronze medal – third place	1997 Shanghai	Vault

Kui Yuanyuan (Simplified Chinese: 奎媛媛; born June 23, 1981) is a former artistic gymnast from China who competed in the 1996 and 2000 Olympic Games.

== Gymnastics career ==
Kui won the floor exercise at the 1996 World Artistic Gymnastics Championships, becoming the first Chinese woman to do so. She then competed at the 1996 Summer Olympics, finishing 4th with the Chinese team. She recorded the highest score of the entire Olympics on the balance beam, a 9.875 during the team optionals, and in doing so, became the only gymnast to top the 9.862 scored three consecutive times by Olympic balance beam champion Shannon Miller. However, a fall from the beam during the team compulsories (resulting in a score of 8.925) prevented Kui from making the beam finals. She also failed to make the floor exercise final, despite her world title on that event.

Kui went on to win two bronze medals at the 1997 World Championships, with her team and on the balance beam. The balance beam result was controversial: Kui performed the most difficult routine of all the competitors in the final—including a full-twisting back layout, as well as three split leaps to a back handspring and two layout step-outs—but finished .012 behind Romania's Gina Gogean. She lost the silver medal to Svetlana Khorkina of Russia in a tie-breaker. The results prompted the president of the International Federation of Gymnastics to publicly chastise the judges.

The following year, Kui won two gold medals at the 1998 Asian Games in Bangkok and two medals at the World Cup Final. In 1999, she had an injury and could not compete. She recovered in time for the 2000 Olympics, where she hoped to win the individual gold medal on the balance beam that eluded her in 1996. However, she injured her knee while vaulting during the preliminary round of competition and could not compete in the finals. She admitted that it was emotionally devastating for her to watch her teammate Liu Xuan take the beam gold.

The Chinese team finished 3rd, but the medal was stripped by the International Olympic Committee in 2010 after one of the team members, Dong Fangxiao, was found to have been underage during the competition.

== Post-gymnastics life ==
After retiring from gymnastics, Kui had surgery on her knee. She began studying French at the Beijing University of International Business and Economics, but dropped out after a few semesters. In March 2006, she married her boyfriend of two years, a football player. A year later, in February, she gave birth to a daughter.

Kui remains close friends with former teammates Peng Sha (her daughter's godmother) and Bi Wenjing.
