= Ma Yanhong =

Chinese artistic gymnast

- Full name: Ma Yanhong
- Born: March 21, 1964 (age 62) or July 5, 1963 (age 63) (disputed) Beijing, People’s Republic of China

Gymnastics career
- Discipline: Women's artistic gymnastics
- Country represented: China (1978–84 (CHN))
- Gym: Shichahai Sports School for Amateurs
- Eponymous skills: Ma I dismount (uneven bars) Ma II dismount (uneven bars)
Medal record
Event	1st	2nd	3rd
Olympic Games	1	0	1
World Championships	1	2	0
Asian Games	2	0	0
Total	4	2	1
Event	1st	2nd	3rd
All-Around (OG/WC)	0	1	1
Uneven Bars(OG/WC)	2	0	1
Balance Beam (OG/WC)	0	0	0
Vault (OG/WC)	0	0	0
Floor Exercise (OG/WC)	0	0	0
Women's artistic gymnastics
Representing China
Olympic Games
Gold medal – first place	1984 Los Angeles	Uneven bars
Bronze medal – third place	1984 Los Angeles	Team
World Championships
Gold medal – first place	1979 Ft. Worth	Uneven Bars
Silver medal – second place	1981 Moscow	Team
Silver medal – second place	1981 Moscow	Uneven Bars
Asian Games
Gold medal – first place	1978 Bangkok	Team
Gold medal – first place	1978 Bangkok	Uneven Bars

Ma Yanhong (simplified Chinese: 马燕红; traditional Chinese: 馬燕紅; pinyin: Mǎ Yànhóng; born March 21, 1964, in Beijing, China) (also reported in some media as July 5, 1963) is a retired Chinese Olympic athlete. She was the first Chinese gymnast, male or female, to win a gold medal at the World Gymnastics Championships and the Olympic Games.

== Biography ==
Ma began gymnastics at the Shichahai Sports School for Amateurs in her hometown of Beijing. The age at which she started training has been variously reported as six, eight and nine. While her birth date was reported as March 21, 1964 in an International Gymnast feature, and Chinese media also gave this as her birth year, she competed under a false birth date of July 5, 1963.

Ma trained under intense conditions; she was described as rebounding off the uneven bars so many times that wounds opened on her skin, and she was under such strict weight control that her lips cracked from dehydration.

In 1978, her first year with the Chinese national team, Ma made her international debut at the Asian Games, where she shared in the team gold medal and won the uneven bars title. She repeated her success at the 1978 Shanghai Cup, again winning team and bars titles. Ma was a member of the 1979, 1981 and 1983 World Championships teams; she was the Chinese National Champion in 1982. At the 1984 Summer Olympics, Ma tied with American Julianne McNamara to win the gold medal on the uneven bars, and both of them scored a perfect 10.0 in the final. This was the first Olympic gold medal ever for China in women's gymnastics.

Ma's best event was unquestionably the uneven bars; she placed first on this apparatus at the age of fifteen at the 1979 World Championships, tied with Maxi Gnauck, making her the first Chinese gymnast to win a World title. Her bars routines were noted for their technical difficulty, virtuosity and originality. The dismount she pioneered, a hecht (release at the height of a swing) followed by a salto backward with a full turn, now known as the Ma, is valued as an "F," the second highest difficulty rating possible, in the current Code of Points. Ma was not only a bars specialist, however: she placed fourth in the all-around at the 1981 World Championships, sixth all-around at the 1984 Olympics, and often won silver or bronze medals on the floor exercise and balance beam in international meets.

After retiring from gymnastics, Ma pursued a university education and spent some time in the United Kingdom and the United States, coaching at clubs in California. She returned to China in 1994 and is now involved in business. She also owns a Japanese restaurant in Beijing and has worked as a commentator for various gymnastics competitions, including the 1999 World Championships in Tianjin. She was inducted into the International Gymnastics Hall of Fame in 2008 as the first Chinese inductee.

== Eponymous skill ==
Ma has one eponymous skill listed in the Code of Points.

Apparatus	Name	Description	Difficulty (Note: Valid for the 2025–2028 Code of Points)
Uneven bars	Ma	Hip circle backward on low bar or high bar - hecht with 1/1 turn (360°) to salto backward	F (0.6)

== Competitive history ==
Year	Event	Team	AA	VT	UB	BB	FX
1978
1978	Asian Games	1st place, gold medalist(s)			1st place, gold medalist(s)		
1978	Shanghai International		1st place, gold medalist(s)		1st place, gold medalist(s)		
1979
1979	World Championships	4			1st place, gold medalist(s)		
1980	USGF International Invitational		6			1st place, gold medalist(s)	
1981	TBS Cup			2nd place, silver medalist(s)	1st place, gold medalist(s)	1st place, gold medalist(s)	
1981	USA-CHN Dual Meet		3rd place, bronze medalist(s)				
1981	World Championships	2nd place, silver medalist(s)	4		2nd place, silver medalist(s)		5
1982	Chinese Championships		1st place, gold medalist(s)		1st place, gold medalist(s)	2nd place, silver medalist(s)	
1982	USGF International Invitational		6		1st place, gold medalist(s)	4	1st place, gold medalist(s)
1982	World Cup Final		4	7	4	4	4
1983	Chinese Championships		6				
1983	TBS Cup				1st place, gold medalist(s)	1st place, gold medalist(s)	
1983	World Championships	5					
1984	Beijing International		1st place, gold medalist(s)	1st place, gold medalist(s)			
1984	Catania Cup		7				
1984	USA-CHN Dual Meet		3rd place, bronze medalist(s)		1st place, gold medalist(s)	1st place, gold medalist(s)	
1984	Olympic Games	3rd place, bronze medalist(s)	6		1st place, gold medalist(s)	5	6
