= Alena Polozkova =

Belarusian gymnast (born 1979)

Personal information
- Nationality: Belarusian
- Born: 11 August 1979 (age 46); Mogilev, Byelorussian SSR, Soviet Union

Sport
- Sport: Gymnastics

Alena Polozkova (born 11 August 1979) is a Belarusian former gymnast. She competed at the 1996 Summer Olympics and the 2000 Summer Olympics.

== Competitive history ==
Year	Event	Team	AA	VT	UB	BB	FX
Junior
1993	European Youth Olympic Festival		4				
1993	Junior GER-BLR-TCH Tri-Meet		6				
Senior
1994	USA-BLR-CHN Tri-Meet		10				
1994	World Championships		13				
1995	European Youth Olympic Festival		16			8	
1996	Catania Cup		7				
1996	ITA-BLR-ROM-RUS Quad-Meet		14				
1996	Olympic Games	6	25				
1997
1997	World Championships	7	15				
1998	Australia Cup		5	5	4	6	5
1998	Cottbus International				7	2nd place, silver medalist(s)	5
1998	European Championships	8	13	8			9
1998	French International		4				1st place, gold medalist(s)
1998	Glasgow Grand Prix			8	7	3rd place, bronze medalist(s)	4
1998	Goodwill Games		11	7			
1998	Sagit Cup			5			2nd place, silver medalist(s)
1998	Swiss Cup						7
1998	World Cup Final						3rd place, bronze medalist(s)
1999	Samboo International					8	
1999	Summer Universiade		7				2nd place, silver medalist(s)
1999	World Championships	12	35				
1999	Zurich Grand Prix					7	
2000	Visa American Cup		6				
2000	European Championships	15	20				
2000	Olympic Games	12	34				
2000	RCA Gymnastics Challenge		2nd place, silver medalist(s)				
