= Lee Hee-kyung =

South Korean gymnast

Personal information
- Nationality: South Korean
- Born: 29 April 1975 (age 51)

Sport
- Sport: Gymnastics
Medal record
Representing South Korea
Asian Games
Silver medal – second place	1990 Beijing	Floor exercise
Bronze medal – third place	1990 Beijing	Team

Lee Hee-kyung (born 29 April 1975) is a South Korean gymnast. She competed in five events at the 1992 Summer Olympics.
