= Alexey Dmitriyenko =

Kazakhstani gymnast (born 1976)

- Алексей Дмитриенко
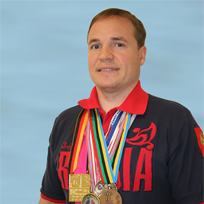

Personal information
- Born: 4 December 1976 (age 49) Krasnoarmeysk, Kazakh SSR, Soviet Union
- Height: 1.65 m (5 ft 5 in)

Gymnastics career
- Discipline: Men's artistic gymnastics
- Country represented: Kazakhstan
- Club: Dynamo

Alexey Dmitriyenko (born 4 December 1976) is a Kazakhstani gymnast. He competed at the 1996 Summer Olympics.
