= Olga Kozhevnikova =

Kazakhstani gymnast (born 1980)

Personal information
- Nationality: Kazakhstani
- Born: 28 August 1980 (age 45) Alma-Ata, Kazakh SSR, Soviet Union

Sport
- Sport: Gymnastics
Medal record
Representing Kazakhstan
Asian Games
Bronze medal – third place	1998 Bangkok	Team
Bronze medal – third place	1998 Bangkok	Balance Beam

Olga Kozhevnikova (born 28 August 1980) is a Kazakhstani gymnast. She competed at the 1996 Summer Olympics.
