= Shim Jae-young =

South Korean gymnast

Personal information
- Nationality: South Korean
- Born: 24 March 1968 (age 58)

Sport
- Sport: Gymnastics
Medal record
Representing Republic of Korea
Asian Games
Silver medal – second place	1986 Seoul	Team
Bronze medal – third place	1986 Seoul	Floor Exercise

- Shim Jae-young
- Hangul: 심재영
- Hanja: 沈載英
- RR: Sim Jaeyeong
- MR: Sim Chaeyŏng

Shim Jae-young (born 24 March 1968) is a South Korean gymnast. She competed in five events at the 1984 Summer Olympics.
