= Sin Myong-su =

North Korean gymnast (born 1966)

- 신명수
- Born: 9 December 1966 (age 59)

Gymnastics career
- Discipline: Men's artistic gymnastics
- Country represented: North Korea
Medal record
Representing North Korea
Asian Games
Bronze medal – third place	1990 Beijing	Rings

Sin Myong-su (born 9 December 1966) is a North Korean gymnast. He competed in seven events at the 1992 Summer Olympics.
