= Yayoi Kano =

Japanese artistic gymnast (1963–2019)

Yaoi Kano
- 加納 弥生
- Born: 1963 Tokyo, Japan
- Died: 28 May 2019 (aged 55–56) Tokyo, Japan

Gymnastics career
- Discipline: Women's artistic gymnastics
- Country represented: Japan

Yayoi Kano (加納 弥生; 1963 – 28 May 2019), married name Sasada (笹田), was a Japanese women's artistic gymnast. She was a three-time national champion, competed at the 1978 and 1982 Asian Games, and taught at Kokugakuin University.

== Early life ==
Kano was born in Tokyo. She attended the Kokugakuin University-affiliated high school and Nippon Sport Science University.

== Career ==
During Kano's career, she made four appearances at the World Championships and won three all-around national titles.

In 1978, at age 15, Kano became the youngest-ever winner of the Japanese Artistic Gymnastics Championships. At the 1978 World Championships, she finished 23rd in the all-around. In December, she competed at the 1978 Asian Games, where she placed 5th in the all-around. She qualified to the floor exercise final, where she won the bronze medal, and the balance beam final, where she placed 5th.

The next year, Kano made her second appearance at the World Championships and placed 26th. She also placed 12th at the 1979 FIG World Cup.

In 1980, she won the Japanese Championships for a second time. She also won the selection event for the 1980 Summer Olympics team; however, due to the Soviet Invasion of Afganistan, Japan boycotted the 1980 Olympics. Kano did attend the USGF International Invitational 1980, an alternative gymnastics events for countries boycotting the Olympics, where she tied for 10th place in the all-around with Kelly Garrison. She qualified for three out of four event finals and placed 5th on uneven bars and floor exercise and 6th on vault.

The following year, she won her third national title. She competed at the 1981 Summer Universiade in July, where she placed 10th. In November, she again placed 26th at the 1981 World Championships. The next year, at the 1982 Asian Games, she finished 10th in the all-around and qualified for the uneven bars final, where she placed 6th.

In 1983, she again competed at the Summer Universiade, where she finished in 17th. She also competed at the 1983 World Championships and placed 12th in the team event with her teammates, but she did not advance to the all-around final.

She attempted to qualify for the 1984 Summer Olympics; however, she was 9th at the internal selection event and did not make the team. She retired from competition afterwards.

== Post-gymnastics career ==
Kano coached at her alma mater, Nippon Sport Science University. In 2013, she became an associate professor at Kokugakuin University, where she initially taught in the Department of Child Studies, then transferred to the Department of Health and Physical Education in 2019. She published on sports and child development and ran a parent-child workshop on exercise. Kano was also vice chair of the Japan Gymnastic Association's Coach Development Committee. Her eldest daughter, Sasada Natsumi, became a successful artistic gymnast as well.

She died of liver failure on 28 May 2019.
