= Yoshihiro Saito =

Japanese gymnast (born 1976)

- 斉藤 良宏
- Born: 29 August 1976 (age 50) Kyoto, Japan
- Height: 1.70 m (5 ft 7 in)

Gymnastics career
- Discipline: Men's artistic gymnastics
- Country represented: Japan
Medal record
Representing Japan
Asian Games
Silver medal – second place	1998 Bangkok	Horizontal Bar
Bronze medal – third place	1998 Bangkok	Team
Bronze medal – third place	1998 Bangkok	Rings

Yoshihiro Saito (斉藤 良宏, Saitō Yoshihiro; born 29 August 1976) is a Japanese gymnast. In the 1998 Asian Games, he was the silver medalist on the horizontal bar, and won bronze medals in both the team event and in still rings. He made his Olympic debut at the Sydney 2000 Summer Olympics, representing Team Japan in the Artistic Gymnastics, finishing 12th All-Around.
