= China at the 1978 Asian Games =

- IOC code: CHN
- NOC: Chinese Olympic Committee external link (in Chinese and English)

in Bangkok
- Medals Ranked 2nd: Gold 51 Silver 55 Bronze 45 Total 151

Asian Games appearances (overview)
- 1974; 1978; 1982; 1986; 1990; 1994; 1998; 2002; 2006; 2010; 2014; 2018; 2022; 2026

China competed in the 1978 Asian Games which were held in Bangkok, Thailand from December 9, 1978 to December 20, 1978.

== See also ==
- China at the Asian Games
- China at the Olympics
- Sport in China
