= Min A-young =

South Korean gymnast

Personal information
- Nationality: South Korean
- Born: 28 January 1975 (age 50)

Sport
- Sport: Gymnastics

Min A-young (born 28 January 1975) is a South Korean gymnast. She competed at the 1992 Summer Olympics.
