= Irina Yevdokimova =

Kazakhstani gymnast (born 1978)

- Born: 14 August 1978 (age 48) Almaty, Kazakhstan
- Height: 153 cm (5 ft 0 in)

Gymnastics career
Medal record
Representing Kazakhstan
Asian Games
Silver medal – second place	1998 Bangkok	All-around
Bronze medal – third place	1994 Hiroshima	Balance beam
Bronze medal – third place	1994 Hiroshima	Floor exercise
Bronze medal – third place	1998 Bangkok	Team
Bronze medal – third place	1998 Bangkok	Vault
Bronze medal – third place	1998 Bangkok	Floor exercise

Irina Yevdokimova (born 14 August 1978) is a Kazakhstani former artistic gymnast. She is the 1998 Asian Games all-around silver medalist. At the 1994 Asian Games, she won bronze medals on balance beam and floor exercise. She also competed in the 2000 Summer Olympics.

== Gymnastics career ==
Yevdokimova competed at her first World Championships in 1993. She advanced to the floor exercise final and placed seventh with a score of 9.462. She won bronze medals on both the balance beam and floor exercise at the 1994 Asian Games. Additionally, she placed seventh in the all-around and eighth on the vault, and Kazakhstan placed fourth in the team competition. At the 1994 World Championships, she finished 35th in the all-around. She then placed 36th in the all-around final at the 1995 World Championships.

Yevdokimova competed on all four apparatus at the 1996 World Championships but did not advance into any finals. She advanced to the all-around final at the 1997 World Championships and placed 17th. She finished eighth in the all-around at the 1998 American Cup. At the 1998 Asian Games, she helped Kazakhstan win the team bronze medal, behind China and Japan. Individually, she won the all-around silver medal, behind Liu Xuan. She then won two more bronze medals on the vault and floor exercise.

Yevdokimova advanced to the all-around final at the 1999 World Championships and placed 36th, but moved up to 35th after Dong Fangxiao was disqualified. She won a bronze medal on the vault at the 2000 Glasgow World Cup, behind Yelena Produnova and Jana Komrsková. She represented Kazakhstan at the 2000 Summer Olympics and finished 47th in the all-around qualifications, not advancing into any finals.

== Eponymous skill ==
Yevdokimova has a vault named after her in the Code of Points.

Apparatus	Name	Description	Difficulty (Note: Valid for the 2025-2028 Code of Points)
Vault	Evdokimova	Handspring forward on - stretched salto forward off	4.4
