= Han Kyung-im =

South Korean gymnast (born 1970)

Personal information
- Nationality: South Korean
- Born: 19 September 1970 (age 55)

Sport
- Sport: Gymnastics
Medal record
Representing Republic of Korea
Asian Games
Silver medal – second place	1986 Seoul	Team
Bronze medal – third place	1986 Seoul	Balance Beam

- Han Kyung-im
- Hangul: 한경임
- Hanja: 韓景任
- RR: Han Gyeongim
- MR: Han Kyŏngim

Han Kyung-im (Korean: 한경임; born 19 September 1970) is a South Korean gymnast. She competed in six events at the 1988 Summer Olympics.
