= Kyoko Seo =

Japanese gymnast (born 1972)

Personal information
- Nationality: Japanese
- Born: 28 June 1972 (age 52); Yamagata, Japan

Sport
- Sport: Gymnastics

Kyoko Seo (瀬尾京子, Seo Kyōko; born 28 June 1972) is a Japanese gymnast. She competed in five events at the 1992 Summer Olympics.
