= Han Kwang-ho =

South Korean gymnast (born 1973)

- 한광호
- Alternative name: Han Gwang-ho
- Born: 1 July 1973 (age 53)

Gymnastics career
- Discipline: Men's artistic gymnastics
- Country represented: South Korea
Medal record
Representing South Korea
Asian Games
Silver medal – second place	1994 Hiroshima	Team

Han Kwang-ho (born 1 July 1973) is a South Korean gymnast. He competed in eight events at the 1992 Summer Olympics.
