= Huang Yubin =

Chinese gymnastics coach

- Full name: Huang Yubin
- Born: February 5, 1958 (age 68)
- Spouse: Sun Xiao mo

Gymnastics career
- Discipline: Men's artistic gymnastics
- Country represented: China
- Retired: 1984
Medal record
Friendship Games (Alternate 1980 Olympics)
Silver medal – second place	1980 Hartford	Pommel Horse
World Championships
Gold medal – first place	1983 Budapest	Team competition
Silver medal – second place	1981 Moscow	Rings
Bronze medal – third place	1981 Moscow	Team competition
World Cups
Gold medal – first place	1980 World Cup	Rings
Bronze medal – third place	1980 World Cup	Parallel Bars
Asian Games
Gold medal – first place	1978 Bangkok	Team
Gold medal – first place	1978 Bangkok	Rings
Gold medal – first place	1982 New Delhi	Team
Gold medal – first place	1982 New Delhi	Rings

Huang Yubin (Chinese: 黃玉斌, born February 5, 1958) is the head coach of the Men's Artistic Gymnastics Team of China. In 1970, Huang Yubin was selected as a gymnast for the Liaoning province team. Four years later, he made it to the national team. He won a gold medal on rings in the World Cup in 1980. It was the first time that a Chinese man won a gold medal in gymnastics.

After the 1984 Los Angeles Olympics, Huang Yubin retired from gymnastics and studied at the Beijing Sports University, where he could only study for a semester since the national team needed more coaches. He went back to the gym and started his coaching career with the women's team.

In his 20 years of coaching the national team, 15 of his pupils won world championships and Olympic gold medals, thus earning him the tag of the "Gold Medal Coach". He is known for his high standards and has helped many gymnasts win world championships. Fan Di was his first "world champion pupil", while she won the gold medal on uneven bars in the 1989 World Artistic Gymnastics Championships. Before that, many people doubted his ability as a coach.

Having proven himself as a coach par excellence over three years in the women's team, he started coaching the men's team. At the very beginning, some of his pupils didn't accept his training methods. They finally understood the coach when they were on the podium. In the 1996 Atlanta Olympics, Li Xiaoshuang won the men's all-around gold. From that year, his students better grasped his style of teaching.

He led the men's team in the 2000 Sydney Olympics and the 2008 Beijing Olympics, where Chinese gymnasts won the men's team golds in both events.
