= Bi Wenjing =

Chinese artistic gymnast (born 1981)

- Born: July 28, 1981 (age 45) Xintai, Shandong
- Height: 153 cm (5 ft 0 in)

Gymnastics career
- Discipline: Women's artistic gymnastics
- Country represented: China
- Retired: 1999
Medal record
Women's gymnastics
Representing China
Olympic Games
| Silver medal – second place | 1996 Atlanta | Uneven Bars |
World Championships
| Bronze medal – third place | 1997 Lausanne | Team |
| Bronze medal – third place | 1997 Lausanne | Uneven Bars |
World Cup Final
| Gold medal – first place | 1998 Sabae | Uneven Bars |
Asian Games
| Gold medal – first place | 1998 Bangkok | Team |
| Gold medal – first place | 1998 Bangkok | Uneven Bars |
East Asian Games
| Gold medal – first place | 1997 Busan | Team |
| Gold medal – first place | 1997 Busan | Uneven bars |
National Games
| Gold medal – first place | 1997 Shanghai | Uneven Bars |
| Bronze medal – third place | 1997 Shanghai | All-Around |

Bi Wenjing (Chinese: 毕文静; born 28 July 1981) is a Chinese gymnast. She competed at the 1996 Summer Olympics in Atlanta, winning a silver medal in uneven bars, and placing fourth in the team competition with the Chinese team.

== Competition history ==
| Year | Event | TF | AA | VT | UB | BB | FX |
|---|---|---|---|---|---|---|---|
| 1995 | Canberra Cup | | 1st place, gold medalist(s) | | | | |
| 1995 | Golden Sands International | | 12 | | | | |
| 1995 | USA-BLR-CHN Tri-Meet | | 9 | | | | |
| 1996 | Chinese Championships | | 3rd place, bronze medalist(s) | | | | |
| 1996 | Olympic Games | 4 | | | 2nd place, silver medalist(s) | | |
| 1997 | DTB Cup | | | | 2nd place, silver medalist(s) | 3rd place, bronze medalist(s) | |
| 1997 | East Asian Games | 1st place, gold medalist(s) | | | 1st place, gold medalist(s) | | |
| 1997 | Swiss Cup | | | | 1st place, gold medalist(s) | | |
| 1997 | World Stars | | | | 7 | | |
| 1997 | World Championships | 3rd place, bronze medalist(s) | | | 3rd place, bronze medalist(s) | | |
1998
| 1998 | Asian Games | 1st place, gold medalist(s) | | | 1st place, gold medalist(s) | | |
| 1998 | Sagit Cup | | | | 2nd place, silver medalist(s) | 1st place, gold medalist(s) | |
| 1998 | World Cup Final | | | | 1st place, gold medalist(s) | 6 | |
| 1999 | Summer Universiade | | 6 | | | 3rd place, bronze medalist(s) | |
