= An Myong-hwa =

North Korean gymnast (born 1974)

Personal information
- Native name: 안명화
- Nationality: North Korean
- Born: 13 November 1974 (age 50)

Sport
- Sport: Gymnastics

An Myong-hwa (born 13 November 1974) is a North Korean gymnast. A graduate of Kim Hyong Jik University of Education majoring in athletics, She competed in six events at the 1992 Summer Olympics.
