= Choe Jong-sil =

North Korean gymnast

Personal information
- Native name: 최종실
- Nationality: North Korean
- Born: 23 June 1966 (age 59)

Sport
- Sport: Gymnastics

Choe Jong-sil (born 23 June 1966) is a North Korean gymnast. She competed in six events at the 1980 Summer Olympics.
