= Sin Myong-ok =

North Korean gymnast

Personal information
- Native name: 신명옥
- Nationality: North Korean
- Born: 30 October 1965 (age 59)

Sport
- Sport: Gymnastics

Sin Myong-ok (born 30 November 1965) is a North Korean gymnast. She competed in six events at the 1980 Summer Olympics. as well as speak out on the issues of North Korea.
