= Lee Jang-hyung =

South Korean gymnast

- 이장형
- Alternative name: Lee Jang-hyeong
- Born: 16 August 1974 (age 52) Daegu, South Korea
- Height: 1.61 m (5 ft 3 in)
- Relatives: Lee Joo-hyung (brother)

Gymnastics career
- Discipline: Men's artistic gymnastics
- Country represented: South Korea
- Club: Taegu Bank
Medal record
Representing South Korea
Asian Games
Gold medal – first place	1994 Hiroshima	Pommel Horse
Silver medal – second place	1994 Hiroshima	Team
Silver medal – second place	1998 Bangkok	Team

Lee Jang-hyung (born 16 August 1974) is a South Korean gymnast. He competed at the 2000 Summer Olympics where he finished fourth in the pommel horse final.. He won the gold medal on pommel horse in the 1994 Asian Games, as well as silver medals in the team events in both the 1994 and 1998 Asian Games.

His brother, Lee Joo-hyung, was also an artistic gymnast.

== Sports links ==
- Lee Jang-hyung at Olympics.com
- Lee Jang-hyung at Olympedia
