= Teruichi Okamura =

Japanese artistic gymnast

- 岡村 輝一
- Born: 27 May 1948 (age 78) Osaka Prefecture, Japan
- Height: 1.56 m (5 ft 1 in)

Gymnastics career
- Discipline: Men's artistic gymnastics
- Country represented: Japan
Medal record
Men's artistic gymnastics
Representing Japan
Olympic Games
Gold medal – first place	1972 Munich	Team
Asian Games
Silver medal – second place	1978 Bangkok	Team
Bronze medal – third place	1978 Bangkok	Rings

Teruichi Okamura (岡村 輝一, Okamura Teruichi; born 27 May 1948) is a Japanese former gymnast who competed in the 1972 Summer Olympics.
