= Maiko Morio =

Japanese gymnast

Personal information
- Nationality: Japanese
- Born: 18 February 1967 (age 59)

Sport
- Sport: Gymnastics
Medal record
Representing Japan
Asian Games
Bronze medal – third place	1986 Seoul	Team

Maiko Morio (森尾 麻衣子, Morio Maiko; born 18 February 1967) is a Japanese gymnast. She competed at the 1984 Summer Olympics and the 1988 Summer Olympics.

== Eponymous skill ==
Morio has one eponymous skill listed in the Code of Points.

Apparatus	Name	Description	Difficulty (Note: Valid for the 2025–2028 Code of Points)
Uneven bars	Morio	Swing down between bars - swing forward to double salto backward tucked with 1/1 turn (360°) in first salto	D (0.4)
