= Li Xiaopeng (gymnast) =

Chinese artistic gymnast

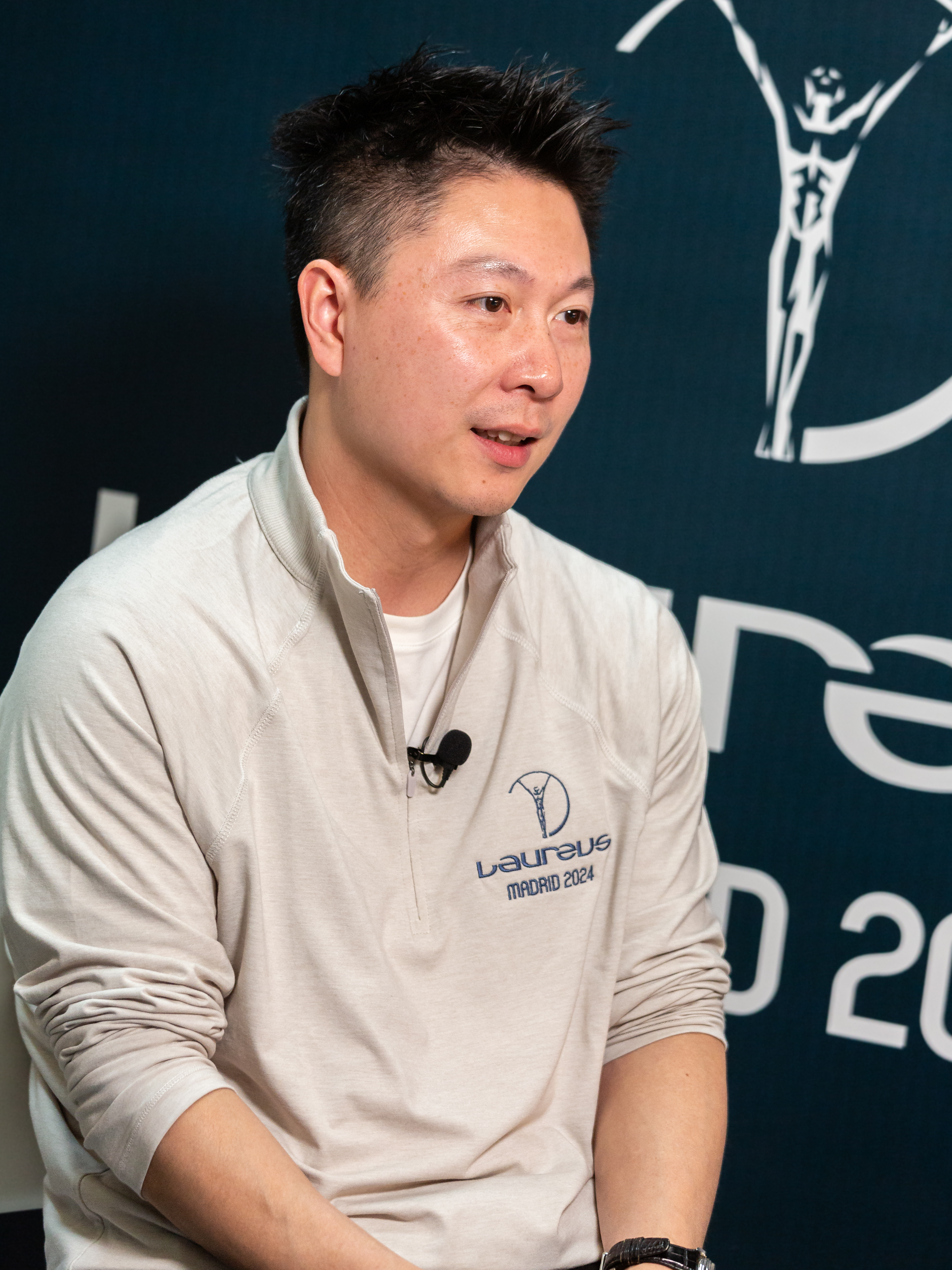
- Li in 2024

Personal information
- Born: 27 July 1981 (age 45) Changsha, Hunan, China
- Height: 5 ft 3 in (160 cm)

Gymnastics career
- Discipline: Men's artistic gymnastics
- Country represented: China
- Eponymous skills: Li Xiao Peng (vault); Li Xiaopeng (parallel bars)
- Retired: 2009
Medal record
Artistic Gymnastics
Olympic Games
Gold medal – first place	2000 Sydney	Team
Gold medal – first place	2000 Sydney	Parallel bars
Gold medal – first place	2008 Beijing	Team
Gold medal – first place	2008 Beijing	Parallel bars
Bronze medal – third place	2004 Athens	Parallel bars
World Championships
Gold medal – first place	1997 Lausanne	Team
Gold medal – first place	1999 Tianjin	Team
Gold medal – first place	1999 Tianjin	Vault
Gold medal – first place	2002 Debrecen	Vault
Gold medal – first place	2002 Debrecen	Parallel bars
Gold medal – first place	2003 Anaheim	Team
Gold medal – first place	2003 Anaheim	Vault
Gold medal – first place	2003 Anaheim	Parallel bars
Silver medal – second place	1997 Lausanne	Parallel bars
Silver medal – second place	2005 Melbourne	Parallel bars
Bronze medal – third place	1997 Lausanne	Floor exercise
World Cup Final
Gold medal – first place	1998 Sabae	Floor exercise
Gold medal – first place	1998 Sabae	Parallel bars
Gold medal – first place	2002 Stuttart	Parallel bars
Gold medal – first place	2006 Sao Paulo	Parallel bars
Asian Games
Gold medal – first place	1998 Bangkok	Team
Gold medal – first place	1998 Bangkok	Parallel bars
Gold medal – first place	2002 Busan	Team
Gold medal – first place	2002 Busan	Vault
Gold medal – first place	2002 Busan	Parallel bars
Silver medal – second place	1998 Bangkok	Vault
Bronze medal – third place	1998 Bangkok	Floor
National Games
Gold medal – first place	2001 Guangzhou	Vault
Gold medal – first place	2001 Guangzhou	Parallel bars
Gold medal – first place	2005 Nanjing	Vault
Gold medal – first place	2005 Nanjing	Parallel bars

Li Xiaopeng (Chinese: 李小鹏; pinyin: Lǐ Xiǎopéng; July 27, 1981) is a Chinese gymnast who specializes in parallel bars and vault. He currently holds 16 world titles, more than any other gymnast in China. On August 29, 2009, he was the torchbearer for the torch relay of the East Asian Games in Hong Kong. He retired from the sport in late 2009.

== Early life and education ==
Li Xiaopeng was born Li Peng. He changed his name in 1997 to avoid sharing the same with the then Premier Li Peng.

He began gymnastics training at Changsha Spare-time Sports School in Hunan Province at the age of 6 and was a member of the Hunan provincial team at 12. Li's diligence and skill soon set him apart from his peers, which could be proved by his several provincial titles. At the age of 15, he was selected into the national team.

== Gymnastics career ==
At 16, Li Xiaopeng became China's youngest world (team) gymnastics champion ever when he and his teammates won the men's team final at the 1997 Lausanne World Championships. At the same event, Li also received a silver medal for parallel bars, just second to his teammate Zhang Jingjin, and a bronze for floor exercise.

At the 1999 Tianjin World Championships, Li was part of the Chinese team to become men's team champion. Individually, he won his first gold medal in vault. However, his failure in parallel bars left something to be desired, which pushed him to train harder for the 2000 Summer Olympics. At the Sydney Olympics, Li and his teammates gave an outstanding performance, earning them the gold medal at the prestigious men's team event, a first for Chinese gymnasts. Li also won an individual gold medal in parallel bars.

At the 2003 Anaheim World Championships, Li was the only person to win three gold medals, namely for the men's team final, vault, and parallel bars. Thus, he was voted as the 2003 World Gymnast of the Year.

However, due to a severe foot injury, Li's performance at the 2004 Athens Olympic Games was unsatisfactory. China finished 5th at the men's team final, and Li could only get a bronze in parallel bars, after being undefeated in major competitions since 2000. He was the fourth athlete to compete in the vault event finals, but unfortunately, he shuffled during the initial sprint and fell on the first jump.

Li had been suffering from a chronic ankle injury and had an operation in 2005. He rested for that whole year, refraining from participating in any competitions.

In 2006, he made a successful comeback by winning gold in parallel bars at the São Paulo World Cup Series Final. By then, he had tied with his idol, China's gymnastic legend Li Ning, by winning a record of 14 world titles.

In 2008, after suffering from a toe injury, he came back and won titles for parallel bars at the two gymnastics World Cups, Cottbus and Tianjin.

After winning two gold medals for men's team and parallel bars at the Beijing Olympics, he surpassed Li Ning by holding 16 world titles, more than any other gymnast in China. He retired in late 2009.

== Post-gymnastics career ==
Li Xiaopeng and his daughter have been regular cast members on the show Dad is Back (a version of Korean reality-variety show The Return of Superman) on which fathers have to take care of their children without the help of anyone (including their wives) for 48 hours. After the first season aired, his daughter gained a lot of love from the public and fans. He also appeared on other television shows such as the first season of The Amazing Race China and the 2016 Race the World (非凡搭檔), which he had to quit before the finale due to the expected birth of his second child.

== Personal life ==
He first met his wife, Li "Angel" Anqi, at the 2003 World Championship in Anaheim, California. Her father, Li Xiaoping, served as a host and interpreter for the Chinese team. They became engaged in 2008, and married in Los Angeles on June 5, 2010. The couple held a second marriage ceremony in Beijing on July 11, 2010. On January 12, 2012, they had their first child, Olivia (Li Xinqi). His second child, a son named Max, was born in June 2016.

== Eponymous skills ==
Li has two named elements in the code of points. A vault, first performed in 2001, was given a 5.4 difficulty. A parallel bars skill, first added to the code of points in 2003, was named for Li in 2013. The parallel bars skill was originally given an SE difficulty, but was moved to an F difficulty in 2006 and most recently was moved to a G difficulty in 2025.

Gymnastics elements named after Li Xiaopeng
Apparatus	Name	Description	Difficulty	Added to Code of Points
Vault	Li Xiao Peng	"Round off, ½ t. and hdspr. fwd. and salto fwd. str. with 5/2 t."	5.4	2001
Parallel bars	Li Xiaopeng	"Roll bwd. with salto bwd. pike to upper arm hang"	G (0.7)	2003

== Competitive highlights ==
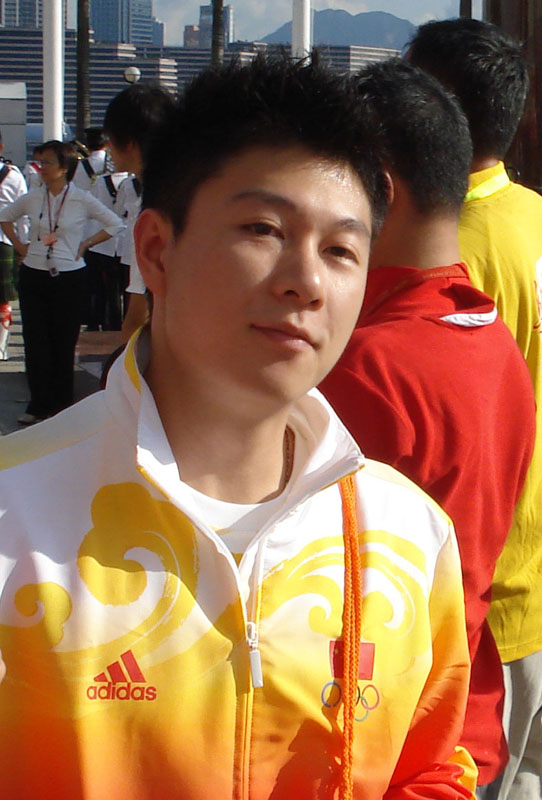
Li in 2008

Year	Competition description	Location	Apparatus	Rank-final	Score-final	Rank-qualifying	Score-qualifying
1997
1997	World Championships	Lausanne	Team	1	226.117		
1997	World Championships	Lausanne	Parallel bars	2	9.737		
1997	World Championships	Lausanne	Floor exercise	3	9.537		
1998
1998	World Cup/Series Final	Sabae	Parallel bars	1	9.750		
1998	World Cup/Series Final	Sabae	Floor exercise	1	9.425		
1999
1999	World Championships	Tianjin	Team	1	230.395	1	230.546
1999	World Championships	Tianjin	Vault	1	9.668		
1999	World Championships	Tianjin	Parallel bars	6	9.137		
2000
2000	Olympic Games	Sydney	Team	1	231.919		
2000	Olympic Games	Sydney	Parallel bars	1	9.825	3	9.762
2000	Olympic Games	Sydney	Floor exercise	5	9.737	2	9.725
2002
2002	World Cup/Series Final	Stuttgart	Parallel bars	1	9.837		
2002	World Championships	Debrecen	Vault	1	9.818	1	9.718
2002	World Championships	Debrecen	Parallel bars	1	9.812	1	9.587
2003
2003	World Championships	Anaheim	Team	1	171.996	3	225.119
2003	World Championships	Anaheim	Vault	1	9.818		
2003	World Championships	Anaheim	Parallel bars	1	9.825		
2003	World Championships	Anaheim	Horizontal bar	5	9.662		
2004
2004	World Cup/Series Final	Birmingham	Parallel bars	4	9.712		
2004	Olympic Games	Athens	Team	5	171.257	4	229.507
2004	Olympic Games	Athens	All around			84	28.699
2004	Olympic Games	Athens	Vault	7	9.368	2	9.800
2004	Olympic Games	Athens	Parallel bars	3	9.762	2	9.787
2004	Olympic Games	Athens	Rings			61	9.112
2005
2005	World Championships	Melbourne	All around			86	19.137
2005	World Championships	Melbourne	Vault			13	9.437
2005	World Championships	Melbourne	Parallel bars	2	9.675	5	9.662
2006
2006	World Cup/Series Final	São Paulo	Parallel bars	1	16.450		
2006	World Cup/Series	Stuttgart	Parallel bars	1	16.300	1	16.350
2008
2008	World Cup/Series	Tianjin	Parallel bars	1	16.775		
2008	World Cup/Series	Tianjin	Horizontal bar	2	16.200		
2008	World Cup/Series	Cottobus	Parallel bars	1	16.250	1	16.500
2008	World Cup/Series	Cottobus	Horizontal bar	3	15.975	2	15.925
2008	Olympic Games	Beijing	Team	1	286.125	1	374.675
2008	Olympic Games	Beijing	All around			45	78.500
2008	Olympic Games	Beijing	Parallel bars	1	16.450	1	16.425
2008	Olympic Games	Beijing	Horizontal bar			10	15.400
2008	Olympic Games	Beijing	Vault	DNQ	DNQ	-	16.775 (one vault only)
2008	Olympic Games	Beijing	Floor exercise			28	15.100
2008	Olympic Games	Beijing	Rings			42	14.800
