= Lee Joo-hyung =

South Korean gymnast (born 1973)

- 이주형
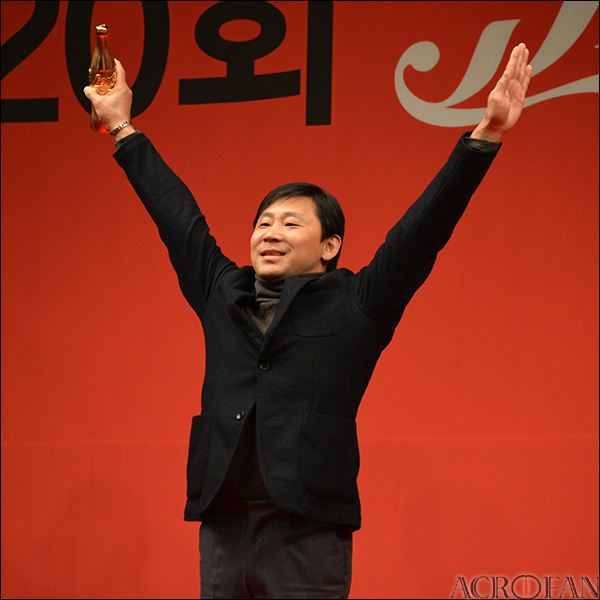

Personal information
- Alternative name: Lee Ju-hyeong
- Born: 5 March 1973 (age 53)
- Height: 1.63 m (5 ft 4 in)
- Relatives: Lee Jang-hyung (brother)

Gymnastics career
- Discipline: Men's artistic gymnastics
- Country represented: South Korea
- Club: Daegu Bank
Medal record
Men's artistic gymnastics
Representing South Korea
Olympic Games
Silver medal – second place	2000 Sydney	Parallel bars
Bronze medal – third place	2000 Sydney	Horizontal bar
World Championships
Gold medal – first place	1999 Tianjin	Parallel bars
Asian Games
Gold medal – first place	1990 Beijing	Parallel Bars
Silver medal – second place	1990 Beijing	Vault
Silver medal – second place	1994 Hiroshima	Team
Silver medal – second place	1998 Bangkok	Team
Bronze medal – third place	1990 Beijing	Team

Korean name
- Hangul: 이주형
- RR: I Juhyeong
- MR: I Chuhyŏng

Lee Joo-hyung (born 5 March 1973) is a Korean former gymnast who competed in the 1992 Summer Olympics, in the 1996 Summer Olympics, and in the 2000 Summer Olympics.

His brother Lee Jang-hyung is also an artistic gymnast.

== Education ==
- Daeryun High School
