= Liu Xuan (gymnast) =

Chinese gymnast (born 1979)

- Born: August 12, 1979 (age 47) Changsha, Hunan, China
- Spouse: Wang Tao (m. 2013)

Gymnastics career
- Discipline: Women's artistic gymnastics
- Country represented: China; (1994–2000 (CHN))
- Eponymous skills: "Liu Xuan" (uneven bars)
- Retired: 2000
Medal record
Women's artistic gymnastics
Representing China
Olympic Games
Gold medal – first place	2000 Sydney	Balance Beam
Bronze medal – third place	2000 Sydney	All-Around
World Championships
Silver medal – second place	1995 Sabae	Team
Bronze medal – third place	1996 San Juan	Balance Beam
Bronze medal – third place	1997 Lausanne	Team
World Cup Final
Gold medal – first place	1998 Sabae	Balance Beam
Bronze medal – third place	1998 Sabae	Uneven Bars
Asian Games
Gold medal – first place	1994 Hiroshima	Team
Gold medal – first place	1998 Bangkok	Team
Gold medal – first place	1998 Bangkok	All-Around
Gold medal – first place	1998 Bangkok	Balance Beam
Silver medal – second place	1994 Hiroshima	Uneven bars
National Games
Gold medal – first place	1993 Beijing	Team
Gold medal – first place	1997 Shanghai	Team
Gold medal – first place	1997 Shanghai	Balance Beam

Liu Xuan (simplified Chinese: 刘璇; traditional Chinese: 劉璇; pinyin: Liú Xuán; born August 12, 1979) is a former Chinese artistic gymnast. She competed in the 1996 and 2000 Summer Olympics and won two Olympic medals, including gold on the balance beam in 2000. She was born in Changsha, Hunan.

== Gymnastics career ==
Liu was coached by Guo Xinming and Zhang Zhen. She took up gymnastics with encouragement from her mother, who had to stop training when her gym closed during the Cultural Revolution.

In 2000, Liu became China's first Olympic champion on balance beam, as well as its first all-around medalist in women's gymnastics. She also led the Chinese team to a third-place finish, but in 2010, their bronze medal was stripped by the International Olympic Committee and awarded to the United States instead after one of the Chinese team members, Dong Fangxiao, was found to have been underage during the competition. In March 2012, the bronze medal Liu and her teammates won at the 1999 World Artistic Gymnastics Championships was forfeited to Ukraine for the same reason.

== Post-gymnastics career ==
At the 2008 Summer Olympics in Beijing, Liu served as the on-site gymnastics reporter for Hong Kong broadcaster TVB.

In July 2009, she became a contracted actress for TVB.

== Personal life ==
Liu married musician Wang Tao in Happy Valley, Hong Kong in December 2013.

In 2015, Liu Xuan gave birth to a son and in 2020, Liu Xuan gave birth to a daughter.

== Results ==
- 2000 Summer Olympics: 3rd team (disqualified), 3rd all-around, 1st balance beam
- 1998 Asian Games: 1st team, 1st all-around, 1st beam
- 1998 World Cup: 1st beam, 3rd bars
- 1997 World Championships: 3rd team, 7th all-around
- 1996 Summer Olympics: 4th team
- 1996 World Championships: 3rd beam, 9th bars
- 1995 World Championships: 2nd team
- 1995 USA/CHN/BLR: 3rd team, 8th all-around
- 1994 DTB Cup: 1st beam, 5th bars, 8th floor
- 1994 Asian Games: 1st team, 2nd bars
- 1994 World Championships: 4th team

== Eponymous skills ==
Liu was the first female gymnast to perform a one-arm giant swing on the uneven bars; she also performed this skill into a Geinger release move. The skill is named after her in the Code of Points. Liu stopped performing it after the 1996 Summer Olympics.

Apparatus	Code	Name	Description	Difficulty (Note: Valid for the 2025–2028 Code of Points)
Uneven bars	3.201	Liu Xuan	Giant circle backward to handstand on one arm	B (0.2)

== Discography ==
Year	Album title
2008	Sweet on the Heart (甜上心頭)
2009	Ready...Go! (出發)
2011	Return Sight (回見)
18 February 2011	Beautiful Faces

== Filmography ==
=== Films ===
Year	Title	Role	Co-stars
2002	Far From Home	Xi Mei	Xu Jinglei, Daniel Chan, Cui Lin
2010	East Wind Rain		
2012	On My Way		
2014	I Am a Wolf		

=== TV series ===
Year	Title	Network	Role	Notes
2002	My Father and I	Mainland	Gao Wenjun	
2003	Ultimate Target	Mainland	Liu Jingyi	
2004	Phantom Lover	Mainland	Tian Fei	
2011	Grace Under Fire	TVB	Mok Kwai-lan	Nominated — TVB Anniversary Award for My Favourite Female Character (Top 15)
2012	Strangers 6			
2018	Legend of Fuyao	Mainland	Fei Yan (非烟)	

=== TV shows ===
Year	Title	Network	Role
2005	Light Blue, Dark Blue	Mainland	Guest
2006	Wulin Dahui	Mainland	Guest
2007	Mingsheng Dazhen	Mainland	Guest
2010	Go! EXPO	TVB	Co-host; 10 episodes
