= Gymnastics at the 2005 East Asian Games =

Gymnastics events were competed at the 2005 East Asian Games in Macau.

== Medal winners ==
=== Men ===
Event	Gold	Silver	Bronze
All-around Finals
Team	(China) China; Dong Zhendong; Du Wei; Feng Jing; Lu Bin; Lü Bo; Xiao Qin	(Japan) Japan; Ryosuke Baba; Kenya Kobayashi; Hiroaki Kusu; Shun Kuwahara; Yasuhiro Ogawa; Naoya Tabara	(South Korea) South Korea; Kim Dae-eun; Kim Ji-hoon; Kim Seun-gil; Sin Seob; Yang Tae-young; Yoo Won-chool
Individual	Feng Jing; China	Lü Bo; China	Yang Tae-young; South Korea
Apparatus Finals
Floor exercise	Ri Jong-song; North Korea	Naoya Tabara; Japan	Kim Seun-gil; South Korea
Pommel horse	Xiao Qin; China	Xu Wei; Macau	Huang Che-kuei; Chinese Taipei
Rings	Lü Bo; China	Lin Yung-hsi; Chinese Taipei	Yang Tae-young; South Korea
Vault	Lu Bin; China	Huang Yi-hsueh; Chinese Taipei	Ri Se-gwang; North Korea
Parallel bars	Dong Zhendong; China	Yasuhiro Ogawa; Japan	Yang Tae-young; South Korea
Horizontal bar	Kim Dae-eun; South Korea	Ryosuke Baba; Japan	Shun Kuwahara; Japan

=== Women ===
Event	Gold	Silver	Bronze
All-around Finals
Team	(China) China; Cheng Fei; Fan Ye; Li Ya; Pang Panpan; Zhang Nan; Zhang Yufei	(Japan) Japan; Manami Ishizaka; Mayu Kuroda; Kyoko Oshima; Ayaka Sahara; Miki Uemura; Satomi Yamamoto	(North Korea) North Korea; Han Jong-ok; Hong Su-jong; Kang Yun-mi; Kim Un-jong; Pyon Kwang-sun; Ri Hae-yon
Individual	Zhang Nan; China	Fan Ye; China	Kyoko Oshima; Japan
Apparatus Finals
Vault	Kang Yun-mi; North Korea	Cheng Fei; China	Hong Su-jong; North Korea
Uneven bars	Li Ya; China	Hong Su-jong; North Korea	Mayu Kuroda; Japan; Han Jong-ok; North Korea
Balance beam	Fan Ye; China	Ri Hae-yon; North Korea	Mayu Kuroda; Japan
Floor exercise	Cheng Fei; China	Pang Panpan; China	Manami Ishizaka; Japan; Kyoko Oshima; Japan
