= Asian Artistic Gymnastics Championships – Women's uneven bars =

The Asian Artistic Gymnastics Championships were first held in 1996.

Three medals are awarded: gold for first place, silver for second place, and bronze for third place.

== Medalists ==
| Year | Location | Gold | Silver | Bronze |
|---|---|---|---|---|
| 1996 | (China) Changsha | (China) Zhou Duan | (Uzbekistan) Oksana Chusovitina | (China) Mao Yanling |
| 2003 | (China) Guangzhou | (China) Chen Miaojie | (China) Fan Ye | (Japan) Manami Ishizaka |
| 2006 | (India) Surat | (China) He Ning | (China) Zhou Zhuoru | (North Korea) Pyon Kwang-sun |
| 2008 | (Qatar) Doha | (Japan) Kōko Tsurumi | (North Korea) Kim Un-hyang | (Japan) Miki Uemura |
| 2012 | (China) Putian | (China) Wu Liufang | (China) Huang Huidan | (South Korea) Sung Ji-hye |
| 2015 | (Japan) Hiroshima | (China) Zhu Xiaofang | (Japan) Aiko Sugihara | (China) Fan Yilin |
| 2017 | (Thailand) Bangkok | (China) Luo Huan | (China) Liu Tingting | (North Korea) Jon Jang-mi |
| 2019 | (Mongolia) Ulaanbaatar | (China) Lu Yufei | (China) Zhou Ruiyu | (South Korea) Lee Eun-ju |
| 2022 | (Qatar) Doha | (China) Wei Xiaoyuan | (China) Tang Xijing | (South Korea) Lee Yun-seo |
| 2023 | Singapore | (China) Qiu Qiyuan | (South Korea) Lee Yun-seo | (China) Zuo Tong |
| 2024 | (Uzbekistan) Tashkent | (China) Yang Fanyuwei | (North Korea) Jon Jang-mi | (Philippines) Levi Ruivivar |
| 2025 | (South Korea) Jecheon | (China) Qin Xinyi | (Japan) Haruka Nakamura | (China) Zhang Yihan |
| 2026 | (China) Zunyi | (China) Qiu Qiyuan | (China) Du Siyu | (Japan) Misa Nishiyama |

== Medal table ==
| Rank | Nation | Gold | Silver | Bronze | Total |
|---|---|---|---|---|---|
| 1 | China (CHN) | 12 | 7 | 4 | 23 |
| 2 | Japan (JPN) | 1 | 2 | 3 | 6 |
| 3 | North Korea (PRK) | 0 | 2 | 2 | 4 |
| 4 | South Korea (KOR) | 0 | 1 | 3 | 4 |
| 5 | Uzbekistan (UZB) | 0 | 1 | 0 | 1 |
| 6 | Philippines (PHI) | 0 | 0 | 1 | 1 |
| Totals (6 entries) | | 13 | 13 | 13 | 39 |
