= Asian Artistic Gymnastics Championships – Women's individual all-around =

The Asian Artistic Gymnastics Championships were first held in 1996.

Three medals are awarded: gold for first place, silver for second place, and bronze for third place.

== Medalists ==
Year	Location	Gold	Silver	Bronze
1996	(China) Changsha	(China) Mao Yanling	(China) Ji Liya	(Uzbekistan) Oksana Chusovitina
2003	(China) Guangzhou	(China) Zhang Nan	(China) Fan Ye	(China) Chen Miaojie
2006	(India) Surat	(China) Zhou Zhuoru	(China) He Ning	(North Korea) Pyon Kwang-sun
2008	(Qatar) Doha	(Japan) Kōko Tsurumi	(North Korea) Kim Un-hyang	(Japan) Miki Uemura
2012	(China) Putian	(China) Zeng Siqi	(South Korea) Sung Ji-hye	(China) Shang Chunsong
2015	(Japan) Hiroshima	(Japan) Aiko Sugihara	(China) Wang Yan	(Japan) Asuka Teramoto
2017	(Thailand) Bangkok	(China) Liu Tingting	(China) Luo Huan	(North Korea) Kim Su-jong
2019	(Mongolia) Ulaanbaatar	(China) Zhou Ruiyu	(China) Lu Yufei	(Japan) Natsumi Hanashima
2022	(Qatar) Doha	(China) Zhang Jin	(China) Tang Xijing	(South Korea) Lee Yun-seo
2023	Singapore	(China) Qiu Qiyuan	(China) Zhang Qingying	(South Korea) Shin Sol-yi
2024	(Uzbekistan) Tashkent	(China) Hu Jiafei	(China) Qin Xinyi	(Philippines) Emma Malabuyo
2025	(South Korea) Jecheon	(Japan) Aiko Sugihara	(Japan) Haruka Nakamura	(China) Qin Xinyi
2026	(China) Zunyi	(China) Ke Qinqin	(China) Zhang Qingying	(Japan) Misa Nishiyama

== Medal table ==
Rank	Nation	Gold	Silver	Bronze	Total
1	China (CHN)	10	10	3	23
2	Japan (JPN)	3	1	4	8
3	North Korea (PRK)	0	1	2	3
3	South Korea (KOR)	0	1	2	3
5	Philippines (PHI)	0	0	1	1
5	Uzbekistan (UZB)	0	0	1	1
Totals (6 entries)		13	13	13	39
