= Gymnastics at the 2006 Asian Games – Women's artistic individual all-around =

Women's individual all-around at the 2006 Asian Games
- Venue: Aspire Hall 2
- Date: 3–4 December 2006
- Competitors: 37 from 12 nations

Medalists
gold medal	He Ning	China
silver medal	Zhou Zhuoru	China
bronze medal	Hong Su-jong	North Korea

The women's artistic individual all-around competition at the 2006 Asian Games in Doha, Qatar was held on 3 and 4 December 2006 at the Aspire Hall 2.

== Schedule ==
All times are Arabia Standard Time (UTC+03:00)

Date	Time	Event
Sunday, 3 December 2006	14:30	Qualification
Monday, 4 December 2006	18:00	Final

== Results ==
Legend

- DNS — Did not start

=== Qualification ===
Rank	Athlete	Vault (gymnastics)	Uneven bars	Balance beam	Floor (gymnastics)	Total
1	He Ning (CHN)	13.850	14.950	15.500	14.750	59.050
2	Zhou Zhuoru (CHN)	14.200	14.350	15.700	14.800	59.050
3	Pang Panpan (CHN)	13.800	13.400	15.750	15.300	58.250
4	Hong Su-jong (PRK)	15.050	14.750	13.250	13.650	56.700
5	Miki Uemura (JPN)	13.500	14.450	14.650	14.050	56.650
6	Kyoko Oshima (JPN)	13.150	13.850	14.500	15.050	56.550
7	Pyon Kwang-sun (PRK)	13.500	14.150	14.900	13.850	56.400
8	Kim Myong-bok (PRK)	14.000	14.100	13.900	14.400	56.400
9	Mayu Kuroda (JPN)	13.300	14.650	14.450	13.850	56.250
10	Hong Un-jong (PRK)	14.550	13.900	13.500	14.000	55.950
11	Manami Ishizaka (JPN)	13.500	13.800	14.450	13.950	55.700
12	Bae Mul-eum (KOR)	13.650	12.900	14.050	13.850	54.450
13	Yu Han-sol (KOR)	13.650	13.300	12.900	14.000	53.850
14	Kim Hyo-bin (KOR)	13.250	13.500	13.150	13.400	53.300
15	Anna Ninkova (UZB)	13.350	12.350	13.650	13.250	52.600
16	Lim Heem Wei (SIN)	13.150	11.600	12.000	14.050	50.800
17	Tatyana Gayfulina (UZB)	12.700	12.450	12.100	12.550	49.800
18	Nurul Fatiha Abd Hamid (MAS)	11.900	12.050	11.900	11.850	47.700
19	Irina Raimbekova (KGZ)	12.300	11.850	12.000	11.350	47.500
20	Nguyễn Thùy Dương (VIE)	13.200	9.700	12.650	11.800	47.350
21	Pürevsürengiin Solongo (MGL)	12.400	10.150	12.950	11.800	47.300
22	Han Bing (CHN)		14.650	15.900	14.900	45.450
23	Shegun Ali (QAT)	11.750	9.850	10.150	11.750	43.500
24	Ranen Abo Frag (SYR)	12.450	9.850	9.250	11.900	43.450
25	Byambanyamyn Yanjindulam (MGL)	12.400	9.450	10.900	10.500	43.250
26	Tatiana Nedbaylo (KGZ)	12.400	7.150	9.500	11.900	40.950
27	Al-Jazy Al-Habshi (QAT)	12.150	9.150	9.400	10.000	40.700
28	Kang Ji-na (KOR)	13.100	13.300		13.200	39.600
29	Yeo Su-jung (KOR)		13.300	13.750	11.500	38.550
30	Cheng Fei (CHN)	15.500			15.700	31.200
31	Zhang Nan (CHN)	14.400		16.050		30.450
32	Kim Un-hyang (PRK)			14.600	14.650	29.250
33	Ayaka Sahara (JPN)			14.350	14.250	28.600
34	Erika Mizoguchi (JPN)	13.550	13.450			27.000
35	Đỗ Thị Ngân Thương (VIE)		12.900	12.600		25.500
36	Han Eun-bi (KOR)			13.200		13.200
DQ	Cha Yong-hwa (PRK)	13.450	14.650			~~28.100~~

- Cha Yong-hwa of North Korea originally finished 34th, but the International Gymnastics Federation took disciplinary action after discovering that Cha's passport had been modified and her age falsified. Her individual results since August 2006 have been nullified.

=== Final ===
Rank	Athlete	Vault (gymnastics)	Uneven bars	Balance beam	Floor (gymnastics)	Total
1st place, gold medalist(s)	He Ning (CHN)	13.750	14.900	15.600	15.200	59.450
2nd place, silver medalist(s)	Zhou Zhuoru (CHN)	14.250	14.500	15.450	14.850	59.050
3rd place, bronze medalist(s)	Hong Su-jong (PRK)	14.900	14.950	13.500	14.450	57.800
4	Miki Uemura (JPN)	13.500	14.400	14.300	13.900	56.100
5	Kyoko Oshima (JPN)	12.850	13.900	14.350	14.900	56.000
6	Pyon Kwang-sun (PRK)	13.350	14.100	14.200	13.450	55.100
7	Bae Mul-eum (KOR)	13.400	12.950	13.750	14.100	54.200
8	Yu Han-sol (KOR)	13.750	13.400	13.350	13.650	54.150
9	Lim Heem Wei (SIN)	13.200	11.600	13.050	14.150	52.000
10	Anna Ninkova (UZB)	13.450	11.600	12.800	13.750	51.600
11	Nurul Fatiha Abd Hamid (MAS)	12.750	12.100	12.950	13.250	51.050
12	Tatyana Gayfulina (UZB)	12.850	11.850	12.800	13.000	50.500
13	Nguyễn Thùy Dương (VIE)	13.300	11.450	12.400	12.850	50.000
14	Pürevsürengiin Solongo (MGL)	12.450	10.250	13.500	13.100	49.300
15	Shegun Ali (QAT)	12.850	10.200	11.000	12.050	46.100
16	Irina Raimbekova (KGZ)	12.150	9.650	11.950	12.150	45.900
17	Byambanyamyn Yanjindulam (MGL)	12.000	9.750	11.750	10.800	44.300
18	Al-Jazy Al-Habshi (QAT)	11.600	8.900	9.100	11.200	40.800
19	Tatiana Nedbaylo (KGZ)	0.000	9.550	8.800	11.800	30.150
—	Ranen Abo Frag (SYR)					DNS
