= Gymnastics at the 2002 Asian Games – Women's artistic individual all-around =

Women's individual all-around at the 2002 Asian Games
- Venue: Sajik Gymnasium
- Date: 2–3 October 2002
- Competitors: 36 from 9 nations

Medalists
gold medal	Zhang Nan	China
silver medal	Oksana Chusovitina	Uzbekistan
bronze medal	Kang Xin	China

The women's artistic individual all-around competition at the 2002 Asian Games in Busan, South Korea was held on 2 and 3 October 2002 at the Sajik Gymnasium.

== Schedule ==
All times are Korea Standard Time (UTC+09:00)

Date	Time	Event
Wednesday, 2 October 2002	15:00	Qualification
Thursday, 3 October 2002	18:00	Final

== Results ==
=== Qualification ===
Rank	Athlete	Vault (gymnastics)	Uneven bars	Balance beam	Floor (gymnastics)	Total
1	Zhang Nan (CHN)	9.275	9.500	9.625	9.100	37.500
2	Kang Xin (CHN)	9.150	9.400	9.650	9.000	37.200
3	Oksana Chusovitina (UZB)	9.375	9.100	8.900	9.325	36.700
4	Huang Jing (CHN)	9.125	8.950	8.900	9.000	35.975
5	So Jong-ok (PRK)	9.075	9.250	8.900	8.525	35.750
6	Park Jung-hye (KOR)	8.900	8.700	8.125	9.125	34.850
7	Kim Un-jong (PRK)	8.900	9.075	7.775	8.700	34.450
8	Kyoko Oshima (JPN)	8.675	8.750	8.050	8.975	34.450
9	Manami Ishizaka (JPN)	8.600	8.750	8.375	8.725	34.450
10	Ayaka Sahara (JPN)	8.750	8.400	8.725	8.450	34.325
11	Erika Mizoguchi (JPN)	8.725	8.350	8.675	8.525	34.275
12	Park Kyung-ah (KOR)	8.700	8.500	8.125	8.775	34.100
13	Pyon Kwang-sun (PRK)	8.850	9.125	8.650	7.450	34.075
14	Choi Min-young (KOR)	8.650	8.500	8.600	8.250	34.000
15	Kim Yong-sil (PRK)	8.975	8.800	7.450	8.250	33.475
16	Aleksandra Gordeeva (UZB)	9.050	8.325	7.425	8.625	33.425
17	Jin Dal-lae (KOR)	8.900	8.300	7.750	8.475	33.425
18	Olga Kozhevnikova (KAZ)	8.625	7.625	8.675	7.700	32.625
19	Inna Zhuravleva (KAZ)	8.775	8.100	7.325	8.275	32.475
20	Ulyana Sabirova (KAZ)	8.450	8.450	8.050	7.350	32.300
21	Nozigul Almatova (UZB)	8.350	7.000	7.850	8.150	31.350
22	Almira Kambekova (UZB)	8.275	7.200	7.975	7.825	31.275
23	Oxana Yemelyanova (KAZ)	8.725	7.000	7.600	7.575	30.900
24	Feruza Khodjaeva (UZB)	8.700	6.750	7.350	8.000	30.800
25	Tammy de Guzman (PHI)	8.325	6.950	7.750	7.200	30.225
26	Phoebe Espiritu (PHI)	8.325	6.900	7.200	7.625	30.050
27	Liu Wei (CHN)	9.175		9.350	8.350	26.875
28	Sun Xiaojiao (CHN)		8.950	9.575	8.150	26.675
29	Kim Ji-young (KOR)	8.750		7.950	8.875	25.575
30	Guo Shun Ping (HKG)	7.800	1.400	6.325	6.625	22.150
31	Chen Miaojie (CHN)	8.875	9.525			18.400
32	Han Jong-ok (PRK)		9.300		7.850	17.150
33	Miki Uemura (JPN)		8.350	8.025		16.375
34	Aya Manabe (JPN)	8.925			7.250	16.175
35	Hwang Kum-hui (PRK)	8.550		7.625		16.175
36	Park Mi-kyung (KOR)		8.300			8.300

=== Final ===
Rank	Athlete	Vault (gymnastics)	Uneven bars	Balance beam	Floor (gymnastics)	Total
1st place, gold medalist(s)	Zhang Nan (CHN)	8.975	9.500	9.375	9.175	37.025
2nd place, silver medalist(s)	Oksana Chusovitina (UZB)	9.525	9.075	8.775	9.025	36.400
3rd place, bronze medalist(s)	Kang Xin (CHN)	9.000	9.000	9.000	9.225	36.225
4	Park Kyung-ah (KOR)	8.900	9.100	8.650	8.975	35.625
5	So Jong-ok (PRK)	9.075	9.000	8.750	8.325	35.150
6	Park Jung-hye (KOR)	8.925	8.150	8.425	9.000	34.500
7	Kim Un-jong (PRK)	8.875	8.300	8.675	8.200	34.050
8	Manami Ishizaka (JPN)	8.700	8.450	8.375	8.375	33.900
9	Aleksandra Gordeeva (UZB)	9.025	8.150	8.175	8.425	33.775
10	Kyoko Oshima (JPN)	8.725	8.600	7.375	8.800	33.500
11	Olga Kozhevnikova (KAZ)	8.725	8.050	7.725	7.950	32.450
12	Inna Zhuravleva (KAZ)	8.725	7.500	7.950	8.200	32.375
