= Gymnastics at the 2006 Asian Games =

- Venue: Aspire Hall 2
- Dates: 2–12 December 2006
- Competitors: 167 from 23 nations

Gymnastics was contested at the 2006 Asian Games in Doha, Qatar. Artistic gymnastics took place from December 2 to December 6. Rhythmic gymnastics took place on December 9 and 10, while Trampoline was contested on December 11 and 12. All Gymnastics events took place at Aspire Hall 2.

== Schedule ==
Q	Qualification	F	Final

Event↓/Date →	2nd Sat	3rd Sun	4th Mon	5th Tue	6th Wed	7th Thu	8th Fri	9th Sat	10th Sun	11th Mon	12th Tue
Artistic
Men's team	F										
Men's individual all-around	Q		F								
Men's floor	Q			F							
Men's pommel horse	Q			F							
Men's rings	Q			F							
Men's vault	Q				F						
Men's parallel bars	Q				F						
Men's horizontal bar	Q				F						
Women's team		F									
Women's individual all-around		Q	F								
Women's vault		Q		F							
Women's uneven bars		Q		F							
Women's balance beam		Q			F						
Women's floor		Q			F						
Rhythmic
Women's team								F			
Women's individual all-around								Q	F		
Trampoline
Men's individual										Q	F
Women's individual										Q	F

== Medalists ==
=== Men's artistic ===
Event	Gold	Silver	Bronze
Team	China; Chen Yibing; Feng Jing; Liang Fuliang; Xiao Qin; Yang Wei; Zou Kai	Japan; Ryosuke Baba; Kenya Kobayashi; Shun Kuwahara; Hisashi Mizutori; Hiroyuki Tomita; Yuki Yoshimura	South Korea; Kim Dae-eun; Kim Ji-hoon; Kim Seung-il; Kim Soo-myun; Yang Tae-young; Yoo Won-chul
Individual all-around	Yang Wei; China	Hisashi Mizutori; Japan	Hiroyuki Tomita; Japan
Floor	Zou Kai; China	Liang Fuliang; China	Kim Soo-myun; South Korea
Pommel horse	Hiroyuki Tomita; Japan	Shared gold	Shared gold
Pommel horse	Kim Soo-myun; South Korea	Shared gold	Shared gold
Pommel horse	Jo Jong-chol; North Korea	Shared gold	Shared gold
Rings	Chen Yibing; China	Shared gold	Timur Kurbanbayev; Kazakhstan
Rings	Yang Wei; China	Shared gold	Timur Kurbanbayev; Kazakhstan
Vault	Ri Se-gwang; North Korea	Ng Shu Wai; Malaysia	Yernar Yerimbetov; Kazakhstan
Parallel bars	Yang Wei; China	Shared gold	Shun Kuwahara; Japan
Parallel bars	Kim Dae-eun; South Korea	Shared gold	Shun Kuwahara; Japan
Horizontal bar	Hisashi Mizutori; Japan	Zou Kai; China	Kim Ji-hoon; South Korea

=== Women's artistic ===
Event	Gold	Silver	Bronze
Team	China; Cheng Fei; Han Bing; He Ning; Pang Panpan; Zhang Nan; Zhou Zhuoru	Japan; Manami Ishizaka; Mayu Kuroda; Erika Mizoguchi; Kyoko Oshima; Ayaka Sahara; Miki Uemura	South Korea; Bae Mul-eum; Han Eun-bi; Kang Ji-na; Kim Hyo-bin; Yeo Su-jung; Yu Han-sol
Individual all-around	He Ning; China	Zhou Zhuoru; China	Hong Su-jong; North Korea
Vault	Cheng Fei; China	Hong Su-jong; North Korea	Hong Un-jong; North Korea
Uneven bars	Hong Su-jong; North Korea	He Ning; China	Miki Uemura; Japan
Balance beam	Zhang Nan; China	Han Bing; China	Miki Uemura; Japan
Floor	Cheng Fei; China	Pang Panpan; China	Kyoko Oshima; Japan

=== Rhythmic ===
Event	Gold	Silver	Bronze
Team	Kazakhstan; Aidana Kauldasheva; Aliya Yussupova; Maiya Zainullina	Japan; Yukari Murata; Sayaka Nakano; Yuria Onuki; Ai Yokochi	China; Ding Yidan; Li Hongyang; Liang Yuting; Xiao Yiming
Individual all-around	Aliya Yussupova; Kazakhstan	Yukari Murata; Japan	Xiao Yiming; China

=== Trampoline ===
Event	Gold	Silver	Bronze
Men's individual	Que Zhicheng; China	Lu Chunlong; China	Shunsuke Nagasaki; Japan
Women's individual	Huang Shanshan; China	Zhong Xingping; China	Ekaterina Khilko; Uzbekistan

== Medal table ==
Rank	Nation	Gold	Silver	Bronze	Total
1	China (CHN)	13	8	2	23
2	North Korea (PRK)	3	1	2	6
3	Japan (JPN)	2	5	6	13
4	South Korea (KOR)	2	0	4	6
5	Kazakhstan (KAZ)	2	0	2	4
6	Malaysia (MAS)	0	1	0	1
7	Uzbekistan (UZB)	0	0	1	1
Totals (7 entries)		22	15	17	54

== Participating nations ==
A total of 167 athletes from 23 nations competed in gymnastics at the 2006 Asian Games:

- China (20)
- Chinese Taipei (9)
- India (6)
- Iran (5)
- Japan (19)
- Jordan (3)
- Kazakhstan (10)
- Kuwait (5)
- Kyrgyzstan (5)
- Malaysia (8)
- Mongolia (5)
- North Korea (15)
- Pakistan (2)
- Philippines (1)
- Qatar (5)
- Saudi Arabia (2)
- Singapore (1)
- South Korea (16)
- Sri Lanka (4)
- Syria (5)
- Thailand (3)
- Uzbekistan (11)
- Vietnam (7)
