= Gymnastics at the 2002 Asian Games – Women's floor =

Women's floor at the 2002 Asian Games
- Venue: Sajik Gymnasium
- Date: 2–5 October 2002
- Competitors: 32 from 9 nations

Medalists
gold medal	Zhang Nan	China
gold medal	Oksana Chusovitina	Uzbekistan
bronze medal	Kim Ji-young	South Korea

The women's floor competition at the 2002 Asian Games in Busan, South Korea was held on 2 and 5 October 2002 at the Sajik Gymnasium.

== Schedule ==
All times are Korea Standard Time (UTC+09:00)

Date	Time	Event
Wednesday, 2 October 2002	15:00	Qualification
Saturday, 5 October 2002	18:40	Final

== Results ==
=== Qualification ===
Rank	Athlete	Score
1	Oksana Chusovitina (UZB)	9.325
2	Park Jung-hye (KOR)	9.125
3	Zhang Nan (CHN)	9.100
4	Huang Jing (CHN)	9.000
5	Kang Xin (CHN)	9.000
6	Kyoko Oshima (JPN)	8.975
7	Kim Ji-young (KOR)	8.875
8	Park Kyung-ah (KOR)	8.775
9	Manami Ishizaka (JPN)	8.725
10	Kim Un-jong (PRK)	8.700
11	Aleksandra Gordeeva (UZB)	8.625
12	Erika Mizoguchi (JPN)	8.525
12	So Jong-ok (PRK)	8.525
14	Jin Dal-lae (KOR)	8.475
15	Ayaka Sahara (JPN)	8.450
16	Liu Wei (CHN)	8.350
17	Inna Zhuravleva (KAZ)	8.275
18	Choi Min-young (KOR)	8.250
18	Kim Yong-sil (PRK)	8.250
20	Sun Xiaojiao (CHN)	8.150
20	Nozigul Almatova (UZB)	8.150
22	Feruza Khodjaeva (UZB)	8.000
23	Han Jong-ok (PRK)	7.850
24	Almira Kambekova (UZB)	7.825
25	Olga Kozhevnikova (KAZ)	7.700
26	Phoebe Espiritu (PHI)	7.625
27	Oxana Yemelyanova (KAZ)	7.575
28	Pyon Kwang-sun (PRK)	7.450
29	Ulyana Sabirova (KAZ)	7.350
30	Aya Manabe (JPN)	7.250
31	Tammy de Guzman (PHI)	7.200
32	Guo Shun Ping (HKG)	6.625

=== Final ===
Rank	Athlete	Score
1st place, gold medalist(s)	Zhang Nan (CHN)	9.350
1st place, gold medalist(s)	Oksana Chusovitina (UZB)	9.350
3rd place, bronze medalist(s)	Kim Ji-young (KOR)	9.150
4	Park Jung-hye (KOR)	9.100
5	Kyoko Oshima (JPN)	8.925
6	Huang Jing (CHN)	8.875
7	Manami Ishizaka (JPN)	8.750
8	Kim Un-jong (PRK)	8.275
