= Gymnastics at the 2002 Asian Games – Women's balance beam =

Women's balance beam at the 2002 Asian Games
- Venue: Sajik Gymnasium
- Date: 2–5 October 2002
- Competitors: 32 from 9 nations

Medalists
gold medal	Kang Xin	China
silver medal	Oksana Chusovitina	Uzbekistan
bronze medal	Pyon Kwang-sun	North Korea

The women's balance beam competition at the 2002 Asian Games in Busan, South Korea was held on 2 and 5 October 2002 at the Sajik Gymnasium.

== Schedule ==
All times are Korea Standard Time (UTC+09:00)

Date	Time	Event
Wednesday, 2 October 2002	15:00	Qualification
Saturday, 5 October 2002	18:00	Final

== Results ==
=== Qualification ===
Rank	Athlete	Score
1	Kang Xin (CHN)	9.650
2	Zhang Nan (CHN)	9.625
3	Sun Xiaojiao (CHN)	9.575
4	Liu Wei (CHN)	9.350
5	So Jong-ok (PRK)	8.900
5	Oksana Chusovitina (UZB)	8.900
5	Huang Jing (CHN)	8.900
8	Ayaka Sahara (JPN)	8.725
9	Erika Mizoguchi (JPN)	8.675
9	Olga Kozhevnikova (KAZ)	8.675
11	Pyon Kwang-sun (PRK)	8.650
12	Choi Min-young (KOR)	8.600
13	Manami Ishizaka (JPN)	8.375
14	Park Jung-hye (KOR)	8.125
14	Park Kyung-ah (KOR)	8.125
16	Kyoko Oshima (JPN)	8.050
16	Ulyana Sabirova (KAZ)	8.050
18	Miki Uemura (JPN)	8.025
19	Almira Kambekova (UZB)	7.975
20	Kim Ji-young (KOR)	7.950
21	Nozigul Almatova (UZB)	7.850
22	Kim Un-jong (PRK)	7.775
23	Jin Dal-lae (KOR)	7.750
23	Tammy de Guzman (PHI)	7.750
25	Hwang Kum-hui (PRK)	7.625
26	Oxana Yemelyanova (KAZ)	7.600
27	Kim Yong-sil (PRK)	7.450
28	Aleksandra Gordeeva (UZB)	7.425
29	Feruza Khodjaeva (UZB)	7.350
30	Inna Zhuravleva (KAZ)	7.325
31	Phoebe Espiritu (PHI)	7.200
32	Guo Shun Ping (HKG)	6.325

=== Final ===
Rank	Athlete	Score
1st place, gold medalist(s)	Kang Xin (CHN)	9.300
2nd place, silver medalist(s)	Oksana Chusovitina (UZB)	8.975
3rd place, bronze medalist(s)	Pyon Kwang-sun (PRK)	8.800
4	Ayaka Sahara (JPN)	8.700
5	Zhang Nan (CHN)	8.625
6	Erika Mizoguchi (JPN)	8.450
7	So Jong-ok (PRK)	8.350
8	Olga Kozhevnikova (KAZ)	7.400
