= Gymnastics at the 2002 Asian Games – Women's uneven bars =

Women's uneven bars at the 2002 Asian Games
- Venue: Sajik Gymnasium
- Date: 2–4 October 2002
- Competitors: 32 from 9 nations

Medalists
gold medal	Zhang Nan	China
gold medal	Han Jong-ok	North Korea
bronze medal	So Jong-ok	North Korea

The women's uneven bars competition at the 2002 Asian Games in Busan, South Korea was held on 2 and 4 October 2002 at the Sajik Gymnasium.

== Schedule ==
All times are Korea Standard Time (UTC+09:00)

Date	Time	Event
Wednesday, 2 October 2002	15:00	Qualification
Friday, 4 October 2002	18:40	Final

== Results ==
=== Qualification ===
Rank	Athlete	Score
1	Chen Miaojie (CHN)	9.525
2	Zhang Nan (CHN)	9.500
3	Kang Xin (CHN)	9.400
4	Han Jong-ok (PRK)	9.300
5	So Jong-ok (PRK)	9.250
6	Pyon Kwang-sun (PRK)	9.125
7	Oksana Chusovitina (UZB)	9.100
8	Kim Un-jong (PRK)	9.075
9	Huang Jing (CHN)	8.950
9	Sun Xiaojiao (CHN)	8.950
11	Kim Yong-sil (PRK)	8.800
12	Manami Ishizaka (JPN)	8.750
12	Kyoko Oshima (JPN)	8.750
14	Park Jung-hye (KOR)	8.700
15	Park Kyung-ah (KOR)	8.500
15	Choi Min-young (KOR)	8.500
17	Ulyana Sabirova (KAZ)	8.450
18	Ayaka Sahara (JPN)	8.400
19	Erika Mizoguchi (JPN)	8.350
19	Miki Uemura (JPN)	8.350
21	Aleksandra Gordeeva (UZB)	8.325
22	Jin Dal-lae (KOR)	8.300
22	Park Mi-kyung (KOR)	8.300
24	Inna Zhuravleva (KAZ)	8.100
25	Olga Kozhevnikova (KAZ)	7.625
26	Almira Kambekova (UZB)	7.200
27	Oxana Yemelyanova (KAZ)	7.000
27	Nozigul Almatova (UZB)	7.000
29	Tammy de Guzman (PHI)	6.950
30	Phoebe Espiritu (PHI)	6.900
31	Feruza Khodjaeva (UZB)	6.750
32	Guo Shun Ping (HKG)	1.400

=== Final ===
Rank	Athlete	Score
1st place, gold medalist(s)	Zhang Nan (CHN)	9.500
1st place, gold medalist(s)	Han Jong-ok (PRK)	9.500
3rd place, bronze medalist(s)	So Jong-ok (PRK)	9.400
4	Oksana Chusovitina (UZB)	9.300
5	Chen Miaojie (CHN)	8.800
6	Manami Ishizaka (JPN)	8.725
7	Park Kyung-ah (KOR)	8.675
8	Kyoko Oshima (JPN)	7.750
