= Gymnastics at the 2006 Asian Games – Women's balance beam =

Women's balance beam at the 2006 Asian Games
- Venue: Aspire Hall 2
- Date: 3–6 December 2006
- Competitors: 33 from 12 nations

Medalists
gold medal	Zhang Nan	China
silver medal	Han Bing	China
bronze medal	Miki Uemura	Japan

The women's balance beam competition at the 2006 Asian Games in Doha, Qatar was held on 3 and 6 December 2006 at the Aspire Hall 2.

== Schedule ==
All times are Arabia Standard Time (UTC+03:00)

Date	Time	Event
Sunday, 3 December 2006	14:30	Qualification
Wednesday, 6 December 2006	17:00	Final

== Results ==
=== Qualification ===
Rank	Athlete	Score
1	Zhang Nan (CHN)	16.050
2	Han Bing (CHN)	15.900
3	Pang Panpan (CHN)	15.750
4	Zhou Zhuoru (CHN)	15.700
5	He Ning (CHN)	15.500
6	Pyon Kwang-sun (PRK)	14.900
7	Miki Uemura (JPN)	14.650
8	Kim Un-hyang (PRK)	14.600
9	Kyoko Oshima (JPN)	14.500
10	Mayu Kuroda (JPN)	14.450
11	Manami Ishizaka (JPN)	14.450
12	Ayaka Sahara (JPN)	14.350
13	Bae Mul-eum (KOR)	14.050
14	Kim Myong-bok (PRK)	13.900
15	Yeo Su-jung (KOR)	13.750
16	Anna Ninkova (UZB)	13.650
17	Hong Un-jong (PRK)	13.500
18	Hong Su-jong (PRK)	13.250
19	Han Eun-bi (KOR)	13.200
20	Kim Hyo-bin (KOR)	13.150
21	Pürevsürengiin Solongo (MGL)	12.950
22	Yu Han-sol (KOR)	12.900
23	Nguyễn Thùy Dương (VIE)	12.650
24	Đỗ Thị Ngân Thương (VIE)	12.600
25	Tatyana Gayfulina (UZB)	12.100
26	Irina Raimbekova (KGZ)	12.000
27	Lim Heem Wei (SIN)	12.000
28	Nurul Fatiha Abd Hamid (MAS)	11.900
29	Byambanyamyn Yanjindulam (MGL)	10.900
30	Shegun Ali (QAT)	10.150
31	Tatiana Nedbaylo (KGZ)	9.500
32	Al-Jazy Al-Habshi (QAT)	9.400
33	Ranen Abo Frag (SYR)	9.250

=== Final ===
Rank	Athlete	Score
1st place, gold medalist(s)	Zhang Nan (CHN)	15.000
2nd place, silver medalist(s)	Han Bing (CHN)	14.925
3rd place, bronze medalist(s)	Miki Uemura (JPN)	14.725
4	Kyoko Oshima (JPN)	14.375
5	Pyon Kwang-sun (PRK)	14.100
6	Kim Un-hyang (PRK)	13.800
7	Bae Mul-eum (KOR)	13.700
8	Yeo Su-jung (KOR)	13.100
