= Gymnastics at the 2006 Asian Games – Women's uneven bars =

Women's uneven bars at the 2006 Asian Games
- Venue: Aspire Hall 2
- Date: 3–5 December 2006
- Competitors: 32 from 12 nations

Medalists
gold medal	Hong Su-jong	North Korea
silver medal	He Ning	China
bronze medal	Miki Uemura	Japan

The women's uneven bars competition at the 2006 Asian Games in Doha, Qatar was held on 3 and 5 December 2006 at the Aspire Hall 2.

== Schedule ==
All times are Arabia Standard Time (UTC+03:00)

Date	Time	Event
Sunday, 3 December 2006	14:30	Qualification
Tuesday, 5 December 2006	18:00	Final

== Results ==
=== Qualification ===
Rank	Athlete	Score
1	He Ning (CHN)	14.950
2	Hong Su-jong (PRK)	14.750
3	Han Bing (CHN)	14.650
4	Mayu Kuroda (JPN)	14.650
5	Cha Yong-hwa (PRK)	~~14.650~~
6	Miki Uemura (JPN)	14.450
7	Zhou Zhuoru (CHN)	14.350
8	Pyon Kwang-sun (PRK)	14.150
9	Kim Myong-bok (PRK)	14.100
10	Hong Un-jong (PRK)	13.900
11	Kyoko Oshima (JPN)	13.850
12	Manami Ishizaka (JPN)	13.800
13	Kim Hyo-bin (KOR)	13.500
14	Erika Mizoguchi (JPN)	13.450
15	Pang Panpan (CHN)	13.400
16	Kang Ji-na (KOR)	13.300
17	Yu Han-sol (KOR)	13.300
18	Yeo Su-jung (KOR)	13.300
19	Đỗ Thị Ngân Thương (VIE)	12.900
20	Bae Mul-eum (KOR)	12.900
21	Tatyana Gayfulina (UZB)	12.450
22	Anna Ninkova (UZB)	12.350
23	Nurul Fatiha Abd Hamid (MAS)	12.050
24	Irina Raimbekova (KGZ)	11.850
25	Lim Heem Wei (SIN)	11.600
26	Pürevsürengiin Solongo (MGL)	10.150
27	Shegun Ali (QAT)	9.850
28	Ranen Abo Frag (SYR)	9.850
29	Nguyễn Thùy Dương (VIE)	9.700
30	Byambanyamyn Yanjindulam (MGL)	9.450
31	Al-Jazy Al-Habshi (QAT)	9.150
32	Tatiana Nedbaylo (KGZ)	7.150

=== Final ===
Rank	Athlete	Score
1st place, gold medalist(s)	Hong Su-jong (PRK)	15.525
2nd place, silver medalist(s)	He Ning (CHN)	15.000
3rd place, bronze medalist(s)	Miki Uemura (JPN)	14.625
4	Mayu Kuroda (JPN)	14.175
5	Zhou Zhuoru (CHN)	13.875
6	Kang Ji-na (KOR)	13.850
7	Kim Hyo-bin (KOR)	12.275
DQ	Cha Yong-hwa (PRK)	~~14.800~~

- Cha Yong-hwa of North Korea originally won the bronze medal, but the International Gymnastics Federation took disciplinary action after discovering that Cha's passport had been modified and her age falsified. Her individual results since August 2006 have been nullified.
