= Gymnastics at the 2006 Asian Games – Women's floor =

Women's floor at the 2006 Asian Games
- Venue: Aspire Hall 2
- Date: 3–6 December 2006
- Competitors: 32 from 12 nations

Medalists
gold medal	Cheng Fei	China
silver medal	Pang Panpan	China
bronze medal	Kyoko Oshima	Japan

The women's floor competition at the 2006 Asian Games in Doha, Qatar was held on 3 and 6 December 2006 at the Aspire Hall 2.

== Schedule ==
All times are Arabia Standard Time (UTC+03:00)

Date	Time	Event
Sunday, 3 December 2006	14:30	Qualification
Wednesday, 6 December 2006	18:00	Final

== Results ==
=== Qualification ===
Rank	Athlete	Score
1	Cheng Fei (CHN)	15.700
2	Pang Panpan (CHN)	15.300
3	Kyoko Oshima (JPN)	15.050
4	Han Bing (CHN)	14.900
5	Zhou Zhuoru (CHN)	14.800
6	He Ning (CHN)	14.750
7	Kim Un-hyang (PRK)	14.650
8	Kim Myong-bok (PRK)	14.400
9	Ayaka Sahara (JPN)	14.250
10	Lim Heem Wei (SIN)	14.050
11	Miki Uemura (JPN)	14.050
12	Yu Han-sol (KOR)	14.000
13	Hong Un-jong (PRK)	14.000
14	Manami Ishizaka (JPN)	13.950
15	Mayu Kuroda (JPN)	13.850
16	Pyon Kwang-sun (PRK)	13.850
17	Bae Mul-eum (KOR)	13.850
18	Hong Su-jong (PRK)	13.650
19	Kim Hyo-bin (KOR)	13.400
20	Anna Ninkova (UZB)	13.250
21	Kang Ji-na (KOR)	13.200
22	Tatyana Gayfulina (UZB)	12.550
23	Tatiana Nedbaylo (KGZ)	11.900
24	Ranen Abo Frag (SYR)	11.900
25	Nurul Fatiha Abd Hamid (MAS)	11.850
26	Pürevsürengiin Solongo (MGL)	11.800
27	Nguyễn Thùy Dương (VIE)	11.800
28	Shegun Ali (QAT)	11.750
29	Yeo Su-jung (KOR)	11.500
30	Irina Raimbekova (KGZ)	11.350
31	Byambanyamyn Yanjindulam (MGL)	10.500
32	Al-Jazy Al-Habshi (QAT)	10.000

=== Final ===
Rank	Athlete	Score
1st place, gold medalist(s)	Cheng Fei (CHN)	15.750
2nd place, silver medalist(s)	Pang Panpan (CHN)	15.250
3rd place, bronze medalist(s)	Kyoko Oshima (JPN)	15.075
4	Kim Un-hyang (PRK)	14.800
5	Kim Myong-bok (PRK)	14.525
6	Ayaka Sahara (JPN)	14.225
7	Yu Han-sol (KOR)	13.825
8	Lim Heem Wei (SIN)	13.450
