= Gymnastics at the 2002 Asian Games – Women's vault =

Women's vault at the 2002 Asian Games
- Venue: Sajik Gymnasium
- Date: 2–4 October 2002
- Competitors: 32 from 9 nations

Medalists
gold medal	Oksana Chusovitina	Uzbekistan
silver medal	Liu Wei	China
bronze medal	Huang Jing	China

The women's vault competition at the 2002 Asian Games in Busan, South Korea was held on 2 and 4 October 2002 at the Sajik Gymnasium.

== Schedule ==
All times are Korea Standard Time (UTC+09:00)

Date	Time	Event
Wednesday, 2 October 2002	15:00	Qualification
Friday, 4 October 2002	18:00	Final

== Results ==
=== Qualification ===
Rank	Athlete	Score
1	Oksana Chusovitina (UZB)	9.375
2	Zhang Nan (CHN)	9.275
3	Liu Wei (CHN)	9.175
4	Kang Xin (CHN)	9.150
5	Huang Jing (CHN)	9.125
6	So Jong-ok (PRK)	9.075
7	Aleksandra Gordeeva (UZB)	9.050
8	Kim Yong-sil (PRK)	8.975
9	Aya Manabe (JPN)	8.925
10	Park Jung-hye (KOR)	8.900
10	Jin Dal-lae (KOR)	8.900
10	Kim Un-jong (PRK)	8.900
13	Chen Miaojie (CHN)	8.875
14	Pyon Kwang-sun (PRK)	8.850
15	Inna Zhuravleva (KAZ)	8.775
16	Ayaka Sahara (JPN)	8.750
16	Kim Ji-young (KOR)	8.750
18	Erika Mizoguchi (JPN)	8.725
18	Oxana Yemelyanova (KAZ)	8.725
20	Park Kyung-ah (KOR)	8.700
20	Feruza Khodjaeva (UZB)	8.700
22	Kyoko Oshima (JPN)	8.675
23	Choi Min-young (KOR)	8.650
24	Olga Kozhevnikova (KAZ)	8.625
25	Manami Ishizaka (JPN)	8.600
26	Hwang Kum-hui (PRK)	8.550
27	Ulyana Sabirova (KAZ)	8.450
28	Nozigul Almatova (UZB)	8.350
29	Tammy de Guzman (PHI)	8.325
29	Phoebe Espiritu (PHI)	8.325
31	Almira Kambekova (UZB)	8.275
32	Guo Shun Ping (HKG)	7.800

=== Final ===
Rank	Athlete	Vault 1	Vault 2	Total
1st place, gold medalist(s)	Oksana Chusovitina (UZB)	9.475	9.425	9.450
2nd place, silver medalist(s)	Liu Wei (CHN)	9.250	9.375	9.312
3rd place, bronze medalist(s)	Huang Jing (CHN)	9.250	9.350	9.300
4	Kim Yong-sil (PRK)	9.025	9.325	9.175
5	Aya Manabe (JPN)	9.025	9.300	9.162
6	Park Jung-hye (KOR)	9.150	9.125	9.137
7	Aleksandra Gordeeva (UZB)	9.025	9.200	9.112
8	So Jong-ok (PRK)	8.950	8.300	8.625
