= Asian Artistic Gymnastics Championships – Men's vault =

The Asian Artistic Gymnastics Championships were first held in 1996.

Three medals are awarded: gold for first place, silver for second place, and bronze for third place.

== Medalists ==
Year	Location	Gold	Silver	Bronze
1996	(China) Changsha	(Kazakhstan) Sergey Fedorchenko	(South Korea) Yeo Hong-chul	(Chinese Taipei) Tung Nien-kuang
2003	(China) Guangzhou	(China) Lu Bin	(Kazakhstan) Yernar Yerimbetov	(Yemen) Nashwan Al-Harazi
2006	(India) Surat	(North Korea) Ri Jong-song	(North Korea) Ri Se-gwang	(Kazakhstan) Sain Autalipov
2008	(Qatar) Doha	(North Korea) Ri Se-gwang	(Japan) Go Tagashira	(Kazakhstan) Stanislav Valiyev
2012	(China) Putian	(North Korea) Ri Se-gwang	(China) Cheng Ran	(Vietnam) Nguyễn Hà Thanh
2015	(Japan) Hiroshima	(Hong Kong) Shek Wai Hung	(Japan) Kenzō Shirai	(South Korea) Kim Han-sol
2017	(Thailand) Bangkok	(Vietnam) Lê Thanh Tùng	(South Korea) Kim Han-sol	(Japan) Shuto Horiuchi
2019	(Mongolia) Ulaanbaatar	(China) Huang Mingqi	(Indonesia) Muhammad Aprizal	(Kazakhstan) Milad Karimi
2022	(Qatar) Doha	(Philippines) Carlos Yulo	(South Korea) Kim Han-sol	(Japan) Shiga Tachibana
2023	Singapore	(Philippines) Carlos Yulo	(Uzbekistan) Abdulaziz Mirvaliev	(South Korea) Kim Jae-ho
2024	(Uzbekistan) Tashkent	(Philippines) Carlos Yulo	(Uzbekistan) Abdulaziz Mirvaliev	(Malaysia) Muhammad Sharul Aimy
2025	(South Korea) Jecheon	(Iran) Mahdi Olfati	(China) Huang Mingqi	(Philippines) Carlos Yulo
2026	(China) Zunyi	(Japan) Wataru Tanigawa	(South Korea) Kim Jae-ho	(Iran) Mahdi Olfati

== Medal table ==
Rank	Nation	Gold	Silver	Bronze	Total
1	North Korea (PRK)	3	1	0	4
2	Philippines (PHI)	3	0	1	4
3	China (CHN)	2	2	0	4
4	Japan (JPN)	1	2	2	5
5	Kazakhstan (KAZ)	1	1	3	5
6	Hong Kong (HKG)	1	0	1	2
6	Iran (IRI)	1	0	1	2
6	Vietnam (VIE)	1	0	1	2
9	South Korea (KOR)	0	4	2	6
10	Uzbekistan (UZB)	0	2	0	2
11	Indonesia (INA)	0	1	0	1
12	Malaysia (MAS)	0	0	1	1
12	Yemen (YEM)	0	0	1	1
14	Chinese Taipei (TPE)	0	0	0	0
Totals (14 entries)		13	13	13	39
