= Asian Artistic Gymnastics Championships – Women's vault =

The Asian Artistic Gymnastics Championships were first held in 1996.

Three medals are awarded: gold for first place, silver for second place, and bronze for third place.

== Medalists ==
Year	Location	Gold	Silver	Bronze
1996	(China) Changsha	(China) Ji Liya	(Uzbekistan) Oksana Chusovitina	(China) Zhou Duan
2003	(China) Guangzhou	(China) Wang Tiantian	(China) Chen Miaojie	(Chinese Taipei) Wu Ling-yi
2006	(India) Surat	(North Korea) Hong Un-jong	(North Korea) Hong Su-jong	(China) He Ning
2008	(Qatar) Doha	(North Korea) Kang Yong-mi	(Hong Kong) Angel Wong	(Vietnam) Phan Thị Hà Thanh
2012	(China) Putian	(Vietnam) Phan Thị Hà Thanh	(North Korea) Hong Un-jong	(North Korea) Ri Un-ha
2015	(Japan) Hiroshima	(China) Wang Yan	(Japan) Sae Miyakawa	(India) Dipa Karmakar
2017	(Thailand) Bangkok	(China) Liu Jinru	(North Korea) Kim Su-jong	(North Korea) Pyon Rye-yong
2019	(Mongolia) Ulaanbaatar	(China) Yu Linmin	(Japan) Ayaka Sakaguchi	(India) Pranati Nayak
2022	(Qatar) Doha	(South Korea) Yeo Seo-jeong	(Japan) Shoko Miyata	(India) Pranati Nayak
2023	Singapore	(South Korea) Yeo Seo-jeong	(Uzbekistan) Oksana Chusovitina	(Philippines) Aleah Finnegan
2024	(Uzbekistan) Tashkent	(India) Dipa Karmakar	(North Korea) Kim Son-hyang	(North Korea) Jo Kyong-byol
2025	(South Korea) Jecheon	(China) Zhang Yihan	(Vietnam) Nguyễn Thị Quỳnh Như	(India) Pranati Nayak
2026	(China) Zunyi	(South Korea) Yeo Seo-jeong	(North Korea) An Chang-ok	(Japan) Shoko Miyata

== Medal table ==
Rank	Nation	Gold	Silver	Bronze	Total
1	China (CHN)	6	1	2	9
2	South Korea (KOR)	3	0	0	3
3	North Korea (PRK)	2	5	3	10
4	Vietnam (VIE)	1	1	1	3
5	India (IND)	1	0	4	5
6	Japan (JPN)	0	3	1	4
7	Uzbekistan (UZB)	0	2	0	2
8	Hong Kong (HKG)	0	1	0	1
9	Chinese Taipei (TPE)	0	0	1	1
9	Philippines (PHI)	0	0	1	1
Totals (10 entries)		13	13	13	39
