= Ri Hae-yon =

North Korean artistic gymnast

- Born: 12 January 1988 (age 38)
- Height: 144 cm (4 ft 9 in)

Gymnastics career
- Discipline: Women's artistic gymnastics
- Country represented: North Korea; (2003–2005)
- Club: Pyongyang City Club
Medal record
Representing North Korea
World University Games
Silver medal – second place	2005 İzmir	Team

Korean name
- Hangul: 리해연
- RR: Ri Haeyeon
- MR: Ri Haeyŏn

Ri Hae-yon (born 12 January 1988) is a North Korean former artistic gymnast. She is the 2005 East Asian Games balance beam silver medalist and team bronze medalist. She also won a team silver medal at the 2005 Summer Universiade. She represented North Korea at the 2004 Summer Olympics and at the 2003 World Championships.

== Gymnastics career ==
Ri competed on the vault, balance beam, and floor exercise at the 2003 World Artistic Gymnastics Championships held in Anaheim, California. She helped North Korea finish 12th in the team qualifications. As a result, North Korea earned a full team berth to the 2004 Summer Olympics. Ri did not advance into any individual finals.

At 16 years old, Ri was selected to represent North Korea at the 2004 Summer Olympics alongside Han Jong-ok, Hong Su-jong, Kang Yun-mi, Kim Un-jong, and Pyon Kwang-sun. She competed on all four apparatuses in the qualification round, helping the team place last out of the 12 full teams. The team did not advance into the team final, and Ri did not advance into any individual finals. Her best individual result was in the all-around, where she finished 52nd in the qualifications.

Ri competed with the team that won the silver medal behind China at the 2005 Summer Universiade. There, she also advanced into the all-around final and placed 12th. She did not advance into any of the apparatus finals. At the 2005 East Asian Games, she won a bronze medal in the team event, behind China and Japan. She also won a silver medal on the balance beam with a score of 9.525, behind China's Fan Ye. There, she also placed 13th in the all-around final.
