= North Korea at the 2004 Summer Olympics =

- IOC code: PRK
- NOC: Olympic Committee of the Democratic People's Republic of Korea

in Athens
- Competitors: 36 in 9 sports
- Flag bearer: Kim Song-Ho (official)
- Medals Ranked 57th: Gold 0 Silver 4 Bronze 1 Total 5

Summer Olympics appearances (overview)
- 1972; 1976; 1980; 1984–1988; 1992; 1996; 2000; 2004; 2008; 2012; 2016; 2020; 2024; 2028

Korean Unification Flag

North Korea competed as the Democratic People's Republic of Korea at the 2004 Summer Olympics in Athens, Greece, from 13 to 29 August 2004. This was the nation's seventh appearance at the Olympics since its debut in 1972. North Korean athletes did not attend the 1984 Summer Olympics in Los Angeles, when they joined the Soviet boycott, and subsequently, led a boycott at the 1988 Summer Olympics in Seoul, along with six other nations.

Olympic Committee of the Democratic People's Republic of Korea sent a total of 36 athletes, 13 men and 23 women, to compete only in 9 sports. For the second time in Olympic history, North Korea was represented by more female than male athletes due to its stark team size of women in diving and artistic gymnastics. Former basketball player and National Olympic Committee official Kim Song-Ho became the nation's flag bearer in the opening ceremony. Both North Korea and South Korea marched together in the Parade of Nations at the opening and closing ceremonies under the Korean Unification Flag, a white flag showing the united Korean peninsula in blue. They had two flagbearers carrying the flag together at each occasion, one representing the North and the other representing the South. The female athletes and staff wore red blazers, while their male counterparts wore blue. Although they marched together, the teams competed separately and had separate medal tallies.

North Korea left Athens with a total of five Olympic medals (four silver and one bronze), failing to claim a single gold for the second consecutive time since Sydney. All of these medals were awarded to the athletes in boxing, judo, shooting, table tennis, and weightlifting. Lightweight judoka Kye Sun-Hui managed to complete a full set of medals in her sporting career with a silver, in addition to her gold in Atlanta and bronze in Sydney.

== Medalists ==
Medal	Name	Sport	Event	Date
Silver	Kye Sun-hui	Judo	Women's 57 kg	August 16
Silver	Ri Song-hui	Weightlifting	Women's 58 kg	August 16
Silver	Kim Hyang-mi	Table tennis	Women's singles	August 22
Silver	Kim Song-guk	Boxing	Featherweight	August 28
Bronze	Kim Jong-su	Shooting	Men's 50 m pistol	August 17

== Athletics ==
North Korean athletes have so far achieved qualifying standards in the following athletics events (up to a maximum of 3 athletes in each event at the 'A' Standard, and 1 at the 'B' Standard).

Key

- Note–Ranks given for track events are within the athlete's heat only
- Q = Qualified for the next round
- q = Qualified for the next round as a fastest loser or, in field events, by position without achieving the qualifying target
- NR = National record
- N/A = Round not applicable for the event
- Bye = Athlete not required to compete in round

Men

Athlete	Event	Final	
Athlete	Event	Result	Rank
Jong Myong-chol	Marathon	2:19:47	35

Women

Athlete	Event	Final	
Athlete	Event	Result	Rank
Ham Bong-sil	Marathon	DNF	
Jo Bun-hui	Marathon	2:55:54	56
Jong Yong-ok	Marathon	2:37:52	21

== Boxing ==
Kim Song-Guk was a surprise finalist in the featherweight class, beating the European bronze medalist in the second round and the All-Africa Games silver medalist in the quarters before edging World runner-up and European champion Vitali Tajbert in the semifinals. In the final, Tichtchenko pulled out into an early lead over Kim and never looked back, easily taking victory and leaving Kim to the silver medal.

Athlete	Event	Round of 32	Round of 16	Quarterfinals	Semifinals	Final	
Athlete	Event	Opposition Result	Opposition Result	Opposition Result	Opposition Result	Opposition Result	Rank
Kwak Hyok-ju	Light flyweight	Ali (IRQ); L 7–21	Did not advance				
Kim Song-guk	Featherweight	Bye	Kupatadze (GEO); W 25–14	Ganiyu (NGR); W 32–11	Tajbert (GER); W 29–24	Tishchenko (RUS); L 17–39	2nd place, silver medalist(s)

== Diving ==
North Korean divers qualified for four individual spots in the following events.

Men

Athlete	Event	Preliminaries		Semifinals		Final	
Athlete	Event	Points	Rank	Points	Rank	Points	Rank
Choe Hyong-gil	10 m platform	419.58	16 Q	600.36	15	Did not advance	
Pak Yong-ryong	10 m platform	414.33	17 Q	596.01	17	Did not advance	

Women

Athlete	Event	Preliminaries		Semifinals		Final	
Athlete	Event	Points	Rank	Points	Rank	Points	Rank
Jon Hyon-ju	10 m platform	272.01	22	Did not advance			
Kim Kyong-ju	10 m platform	263.52	25	Did not advance			

== Gymnastics ==
=== Artistic ===
Men

Athlete	Event	Qualification								Final							
Athlete	Event	Apparatus						Total	Rank	Apparatus						Total	Rank
Athlete	Event	F	PH	R	V	PB	HB	Total	Rank	F	PH	R	V	PB	HB	Total	Rank
Kim Hyon-il	Pommel horse	—N/a	9.112	—N/a				9.112	56	Did not advance							
Kim Hyon-il	Parallel bars	—N/a				9.537	—N/a	9.537	35	Did not advance							
Ri Jong-song	Floor	9.675	—N/a					9.675	14	Did not advance							
Ri Jong-song	Vault	—N/a			9.162	—N/a		9.162	62	Did not advance							

Women
Team

Athlete	Event	Qualification						Final					
Athlete	Event	Apparatus				Total	Rank	Apparatus				Total	Rank
Athlete	Event	V	UB	BB	F	Total	Rank	V	UB	BB	F	Total	Rank
Han Jong-ok	Team	—N/a	9.537	8.000	—N/a			Did not advance					
Hong Su-jong	Team	9.075	9.200	8.212	8.475	34.962	50	Did not advance					
Kang Yun-mi	Team	9.637 Q	—N/a		8.850	—N/a		Did not advance					
Kim Un-jong	Team	9.125	9.475	8.412	9.050	36.062	36	Did not advance					
Pyon Kwang-sun	Team	9.200	9.600 Q	9.062	8.650	36.512	23 Q	Did not advance					
Ri Hae-yon	Team	8.762	8.862	8.600	8.687	34.911	52	Did not advance					
Total	Team	37.037	37.812	34.286	35.237	144.372	12	Did not advance					

Individual finals

Athlete	Event	Apparatus				Total	Rank
Athlete	Event	F	V	UB	BB	Total	Rank
Kang Yun-mi	Vault	—N/a	9.381	—N/a		9.381	5
Pyon Kwang-sun	All-around	8.525	9.587	8.850	8.900	35.862	17
Pyon Kwang-sun	Uneven bars	—N/a		9.600	—N/a	9.600	4

== Judo ==
Six North Korean judoka (one man and five women) qualified for the following events.

Men

Athlete	Event	Round of 32	Round of 16	Quarterfinals	Semifinals	Repechage 1	Repechage 2	Repechage 3	Final / BM	
Athlete	Event	Opposition Result	Opposition Result	Opposition Result	Opposition Result	Opposition Result	Opposition Result	Opposition Result	Opposition Result	Rank
Pak Nam-chol	−60 kg	Lounifi (TUN); L 0001–1000	Did not advance							

Women

Athlete	Event	Round of 32	Round of 16	Quarterfinals	Semifinals	Repechage 1	Repechage 2	Repechage 3	Final / BM	
Athlete	Event	Opposition Result	Opposition Result	Opposition Result	Opposition Result	Opposition Result	Opposition Result	Opposition Result	Opposition Result	Rank
Ri Kyong-ok	−48 kg	Yıldız (TUR); L 0021–0111	Did not advance							
Ri Sang-sim	−52 kg	Yokosawa (JPN); L 0000–1000	Did not advance			Diédhiou (SEN); W 0020–0000	Singleton (GBR); L 0010–0011	Did not advance		
Kye Sun-hui	−57 kg	Bezzina (MLT); W 1010–0000	Yukhareva (RUS); W 0031–0010	Cox (GBR); W 1010–0010	Lupetey (CUB); W 1000–0000	Bye			Bönisch (GER); L 0010–0011	2nd place, silver medalist(s)
Hong Ok-song	−63 kg	Scapin (ITA); W 0001–0000	Moller (RSA); W 1000–0000	Heill (AUT); L 0010–0100	Did not advance	Bye	Rousey (USA); W 0010–0001	González (CUB); L 0000–1010	Did not advance	
Kim Ryon-mi	−70 kg	Bye	Moreira (ANG); W 1010–0000	Arlove (AUS); L 0100–1000	Did not advance	Bye	Pažoutová (CZE); W 0100–0011	Jacques (BEL); L 0030–0110	Did not advance	

== Shooting ==
Three North Korean shooters (two men and one woman) qualified to compete in the following events:

Men

Athlete	Event	Qualification		Final	
Athlete	Event	Points	Rank	Points	Rank
Kim Hyon-ung	10 m air pistol	583	=4 Q	682	6
Kim Hyon-ung	25 m rapid fire pistol	572	16	Did not advance	
Kim Hyon-ung	50 m pistol	553	=18	Did not advance	
Kim Jong-su	10 m air pistol	582	=6 Q	681.2	8
Kim Jong-su	50 m pistol	564	=3 Q	657.7	3rd place, bronze medalist(s)

Women

Athlete	Event	Qualification		Final	
Athlete	Event	Points	Rank	Points	Rank
Ri Hyon-ok	Skeet	68 (2)	7	Did not advance	

== Table tennis ==
Four North Korean table tennis players qualified for the following events.

Athlete	Event	Round 1	Round 2	Round 3	Round 4	Quarterfinals	Semifinals	Final / BM	
Athlete	Event	Opposition Result	Opposition Result	Opposition Result	Opposition Result	Opposition Result	Opposition Result	Opposition Result	Rank
O Il	Men's singles	Luyindula (COD); W 4–0	Leung C Y (HKG); L 1–4	Did not advance					
Kim Hyang-mi	Women's singles	Bye	Fazekas (HUN); W 4–1	Steff (ROM); W 4–2	Niu Jf (CHN); W 4–0	Zhang Xl (SIN); W 4–2	Li Jw (SIN); W 4–3	Zhang Yn (CHN); L 0–4	2nd place, silver medalist(s)
Kim Hyon-hui	Women's singles	Bye		Jing Jh (SIN); W 4–2	Tie Y N (HKG); L 0–4	Did not advance			
Kim Yun-mi	Women's singles	Bye	Offiong (NGR); W 4–1	Wang N (HKG); L 2–4	Did not advance				
Kim Hyang-mi; Kim Hyon-hui	Women's doubles	Bye			C Li / K Li (NZL); W 4–1	Lee E-S / Seok E-M (KOR); L 1–4	Did not advance		

== Weightlifting ==
Four North Korean weightlifters qualified for the following events:

Athlete	Event	Snatch		Clean & Jerk		Total	Rank
Athlete	Event	Result	Rank	Result	Rank	Total	Rank
Im Yong-su	Men's −62 kg	140	=2	~~170~~	DNF	140	DNF
Choe Un-sim	Women's −48 kg	82.5	=4	95	=10	177.5	8
Pak Hyon-suk	Women's −58 kg	95	=6	122.5	=5	217.5	6
Ri Song-hui	Women's −58 kg	102.5	=2	130	=1	232.5	2nd place, silver medalist(s)

== Wrestling ==
Key

- VT - Victory by Fall.
- PP - Decision by Points - the loser with technical points.
- PO - Decision by Points - the loser without technical points.

Men's freestyle

Athlete	Event	Elimination Pool				Quarterfinal	Semifinal	Final / BM	
Athlete	Event	Opposition Result	Opposition Result	Opposition Result	Rank	Opposition Result	Opposition Result	Opposition Result	Rank
O Song-nam	−55 kg	Kardanov (GRE); L 1–3 ^{PP}	Berberyan (ARM); W 3–1 ^{PP}	Doğan (TUR); W 5–0 ^{VB}	2	Did not advance			8

== See also ==
- North Korea at the 2002 Asian Games
