= Gymnastics at the 2002 Asian Games – Women's artistic team =

Women's team at the 2002 Asian Games
- Venue: Sajik Gymnasium
- Date: 2 October 2002
- Competitors: 33 from 6 nations

Medalists
gold medal	China; Chen Miaojie, Huang Jing, Kang Xin, Liu Wei, Sun Xiaojiao, Zhang Nan
silver medal	North Korea; Han Jong-ok, Hwang Kum-hui, Kim Un-jong, Kim Yong-sil, Pyon Kwang-sun, So Jong-ok
bronze medal	Japan; Manami Ishizaka, Aya Manabe, Erika Mizoguchi, Kyoko Oshima, Ayaka Sahara, Miki Uemura

The women's artistic team competition at the 2002 Asian Games in Busan, South Korea was held on 2 October 2002 at the Sajik Gymnasium.

== Schedule ==
All times are Korea Standard Time (UTC+09:00)

Date	Time	Event
Wednesday, 2 October 2002	15:00	Final

== Results ==
Rank	Team	Vault (gymnastics)	Uneven bars	Balance beam	Floor (gymnastics)	Total
1st place, gold medalist(s)	China (CHN)	36.725	37.375	38.200	35.450	147.750
	Chen Miaojie	~~8.875~~	9.525			
	Huang Jing	9.125	~~8.950~~	~~8.900~~	9.000	
	Kang Xin	9.150	9.400	9.650	9.000	
	Liu Wei	9.175		9.350	8.350	
	Sun Xiaojiao		8.950	9.575	~~8.150~~	
	Zhang Nan	9.275	9.500	9.625	9.100	
2nd place, silver medalist(s)	North Korea (PRK)	35.800	36.750	32.950	33.325	138.825
	Han Jong-ok		9.300		7.850	
	Hwang Kum-hui	~~8.550~~		7.625		
	Kim Un-jong	8.900	9.075	7.775	8.700	
	Kim Yong-sil	8.975	~~8.800~~	~~7.450~~	8.250	
	Pyon Kwang-sun	8.850	9.125	8.650	~~7.450~~	
	So Jong-ok	9.075	9.250	8.900	8.525	
3rd place, bronze medalist(s)	Japan (JPN)	35.075	34.250	33.825	34.675	137.825
	Manami Ishizaka	~~8.600~~	8.750	8.375	8.725	
	Aya Manabe	8.925			~~7.250~~	
	Erika Mizoguchi	8.725	~~8.350~~	8.675	8.525	
	Kyoko Oshima	8.675	8.750	8.050	8.975	
	Ayaka Sahara	8.750	8.400	8.725	8.450	
	Miki Uemura		8.350	~~8.025~~		
4	South Korea (KOR)	35.250	34.000	32.800	35.250	137.300
	Choi Min-young	~~8.650~~	8.500	8.600	~~8.250~~	
	Jin Dal-lae	8.900	~~8.300~~	~~7.750~~	8.475	
	Kim Ji-young	8.750		7.950	8.875	
	Park Jung-hye	8.900	8.700	8.125	9.125	
	Park Kyung-ah	8.700	8.500	8.125	8.775	
	Park Mi-kyung		8.300			
5	Uzbekistan (UZB)	35.475	31.625	32.150	34.100	133.350
	Nozigul Almatova	8.350	7.000	7.850	8.150	
	Oksana Chusovitina	9.375	9.100	8.900	9.325	
	Aleksandra Gordeeva	9.050	8.325	7.425	8.625	
	Almira Kambekova	~~8.275~~	7.200	7.975	~~7.825~~	
	Feruza Khodjaeva	8.700	~~6.750~~	~~7.350~~	8.000	
6	Kazakhstan (KAZ)	34.575	31.175	31.650	30.900	128.300
	Olga Kozhevnikova	8.625	7.625	8.675	7.700	
	Ulyana Sabirova	8.450	8.450	8.050	7.350	
	Oxana Yemelyanova	8.725	7.000	7.600	7.575	
	Inna Zhuravleva	8.775	8.100	7.325	8.275	
