= Gymnastics at the 2006 Asian Games – Women's artistic team =

Women's team at the 2006 Asian Games
- Venue: Aspire Hall 2
- Date: 3 December 2006
- Competitors: 24 from 4 nations

Medalists
gold medal	China; Cheng Fei, Han Bing, He Ning, Pang Panpan, Zhang Nan, Zhou Zhuoru
silver medal	Japan; Manami Ishizaka, Mayu Kuroda, Erika Mizoguchi, Kyoko Oshima, Ayaka Sahara, Miki Uemura
bronze medal	South Korea; Bae Mul-eum, Han Eun-bi, Kang Ji-na, Kim Hyo-bin, Yeo Su-jung, Yeo Su-jung

The women's artistic team competition at the 2006 Asian Games in Doha, Qatar was held on 3 December 2006 at the Aspire Hall 2.

== Schedule ==
All times are Arabia Standard Time (UTC+03:00)

Date	Time	Event
Sunday, 3 December 2006	14:30	Final

== Results ==
Rank	Team	Vault (gymnastics)	Uneven bars	Balance beam	Floor (gymnastics)	Total
1st place, gold medalist(s)	China (CHN)	57.950	57.350	63.400	60.700	239.400
	Cheng Fei	15.500			15.700	
	Han Bing		14.650	15.900	14.900	
	He Ning	13.850	14.950	~~15.500~~	~~14.750~~	
	Pang Panpan	~~13.800~~	13.400	15.750	15.300	
	Zhang Nan	14.400		16.050		
	Zhou Zhuoru	14.200	14.350	15.700	14.800	
2nd place, silver medalist(s)	Japan (JPN)	53.850	56.750	58.050	57.300	225.950
	Manami Ishizaka	13.500	13.800	14.450	13.950	
	Mayu Kuroda	13.300	14.650	14.450	~~13.850~~	
	Erika Mizoguchi	13.550	~~13.450~~			
	Kyoko Oshima	~~13.150~~	13.850	14.500	15.050	
	Ayaka Sahara			~~14.350~~	14.250	
	Miki Uemura	13.500	14.450	14.650	14.050	
3rd place, bronze medalist(s)	South Korea (KOR)	53.650	53.400	54.150	54.450	215.650
	Bae Mul-eum	13.650	~~12.900~~	14.050	13.850	
	Han Eun-bi			13.200		
	Kang Ji-na	13.100	13.300		13.200	
	Kim Hyo-bin	13.250	13.500	13.150	13.400	
	Yeo Su-jung		13.300	13.750	~~11.500~~	
	Yu Han-sol	13.650	13.300	~~12.900~~	14.000	
DQ	North Korea (PRK)	57.100	57.650	56.900	56.900	~~228.550~~
	Cha Yong-hwa	~~13.450~~	14.650			
	Hong Su-jong	15.050	14.750	~~13.250~~	~~13.650~~	
	Hong Un-jong	14.550	~~13.900~~	13.500	14.000	
	Kim Myong-bok	14.000	14.100	13.900	14.400	
	Kim Un-hyang			14.600	14.650	
	Pyon Kwang-sun	13.500	14.150	14.900	13.850	

- North Korea originally won the silver medal, but the International Gymnastics Federation took disciplinary action after discovering that Cha Yong-hwa's passport had been modified and her age falsified. Her individual results since August 2006, and the results of any team she was part of, have been nullified.
