= Gymnastics at the 2006 Asian Games – Women's vault =

Women's vault at the 2006 Asian Games
- Venue: Aspire Hall 2
- Date: 3–5 December 2006
- Competitors: 9 from 7 nations

Medalists
gold medal	Cheng Fei	China
silver medal	Hong Su-jong	North Korea
bronze medal	Hong Un-jong	North Korea

The women's vault competition at the 2006 Asian Games in Doha, Qatar was held on 3 and 5 December 2006 at the Aspire Hall 2.

== Schedule ==
All times are Arabia Standard Time (UTC+03:00)

Date	Time	Event
Sunday, 3 December 2006	14:30	Qualification
Tuesday, 5 December 2006	17:00	Final

== Results ==
=== Qualification ===
Rank	Athlete	Vault 1	Vault 2	Total
1	Cheng Fei (CHN)	15.500	15.000	15.250
2	Hong Su-jong (PRK)	15.050	14.900	14.975
3	Hong Un-jong (PRK)	14.550	14.300	14.425
4	Zhou Zhuoru (CHN)	14.200	13.700	13.950
5	Yu Han-sol (KOR)	13.650	13.650	13.650
6	Anna Ninkova (UZB)	13.350	13.450	13.400
7	Miki Uemura (JPN)	13.500	12.850	13.175
8	Lim Heem Wei (SIN)	13.150	12.900	13.025
9	Shegun Ali (QAT)	11.750	12.500	12.125

=== Final ===
Rank	Athlete	Vault 1	Vault 2	Total
1st place, gold medalist(s)	Cheng Fei (CHN)	15.175	15.600	15.387
2nd place, silver medalist(s)	Hong Su-jong (PRK)	15.500	14.975	15.237
3rd place, bronze medalist(s)	Hong Un-jong (PRK)	15.050	14.875	14.962
4	Yu Han-sol (KOR)	13.925	13.625	13.775
5	Miki Uemura (JPN)	13.700	13.700	13.700
6	Anna Ninkova (UZB)	13.325	13.475	13.400
7	Lim Heem Wei (SIN)	13.500	13.150	13.325
8	Shegun Ali (QAT)	12.600	13.300	12.950
