= 2006 Asian Artistic Gymnastics Championships =

International gymnastics competition

- Host city: Surat, India
- Dates: 30 July – 3 August 2006
- Main venue: Surat Indoor Stadium

The 2006 Asian Artistic Gymnastics Championships were the 3rd edition of the Asian Artistic Gymnastics Championships, and were held in Surat, India from 30 July to 3 August 2006.

== Medal summary ==
=== Men ===
Event	Gold	Silver	Bronze
Team	China; Chen Yibing; Liang Fuliang; Zou Kai; Dong Zhendong	Japan; Tomoharu Sano; Hiroaki Kusu; Kazusa Fujita; Ryuta Nakazato	South Korea; Yoo Won-chul; Kim Ji-hoon; Kim Soo-myun; Yoo Jin-wook
Individual all-around	Chen Yibing; China	Tomoharu Sano; Japan	Hiroaki Kusu; Japan
Floor	Zou Kai; China	Shared gold	Ashish Kumar; India
Floor	Ri Jong-song; North Korea	Shared gold	Fadi Bahlawan; Syria
Pommel horse	Lin Hsiang-wei; Chinese Taipei	Huang Che-kuei; Chinese Taipei	Kim Ji-hoon; South Korea
Rings	Chen Yibing; China	Zhong Jian; Hong Kong	Weng Shih-hang; Chinese Taipei
Vault	Ri Jong-song; North Korea	Ri Se-gwang; North Korea	Sain Autalipov; Kazakhstan
Parallel bars	Tomoharu Sano; Japan	Dong Zhendong; China	Yoo Won-chul; South Korea
Horizontal bar	Zou Kai; China	Ryuta Nakazato; Japan	Tomoharu Sano; Japan

=== Women ===
Event	Gold	Silver	Bronze
Team	China; Zhou Zhuoru; He Ning; Han Bing; Zhang Xin	North Korea; Pyon Kwang-sun; Hong Su-jong; Hong Un-jong; Kim Un-hyang	Japan; Manami Ishizaka; Miki Uemura; Setsubai Takaseki; Kyoko Oshima
Individual all-around	Zhou Zhuoru; China	He Ning; China	Pyon Kwang-sun; North Korea
Vault	Hong Un-jong; North Korea	Hong Su-jong; North Korea	He Ning; China
Uneven bars	He Ning; China	Zhou Zhuoru; China	Pyon Kwang-sun; North Korea
Balance beam	He Ning; China	Han Bing; China	Kim Un-hyang; North Korea
Floor	He Ning; China	Zhou Zhuoru; China	Hong Su-jong; North Korea

== Medal table ==
Rank	Nation	Gold	Silver	Bronze	Total
1	China	10	5	1	16
2	North Korea	3	3	4	10
3	Japan	1	3	3	7
4	Chinese Taipei	1	1	1	3
5	Hong Kong	0	1	0	1
6	South Korea	0	0	3	3
7	India	0	0	1	1
7	Kazakhstan	0	0	1	1
7	Syria	0	0	1	1
Totals (9 entries)		15	13	15	43

== Participating nations ==
105 athletes from 19 nations competed.

- Bangladesh (4)
- China (8)
- Chinese Taipei (6)
- Hong Kong (5)
- India (8)
- Iran (4)
- Japan (8)
- Jordan (3)
- Kazakhstan (4)
- Kuwait (3)
- Malaysia (5)
- North Korea (8)
- Singapore (1)
- South Korea (8)
- Sri Lanka (8)
- Syria (2)
- Thailand (6)
- Uzbekistan (8)
- Vietnam (6)
