= Wushu at the 2005 East Asian Games =

- Dates: October 30 - November 1, 2005

Wushu was contested by both men and women at the 2005 East Asian Games in taolu and sanshou disciplines from October 30 to November 1, 2005.

== Medal table ==
Taolu only.

Rank	Nation	Gold	Silver	Bronze	Total
1	China (CHN)	7	0	2	9
2	Macau (MAC)	2	6	1	9
3	South Korea (KOR)	1	0	0	1
4	Japan (JPN)	0	2	4	6
5	Chinese Taipei (TPE)	0	2	3	5
Totals (5 entries)		10	10	10	30

== Medalists ==
=== Men ===
Event	Gold	Silver	Bronze
Changquan	Jia Rui; Macau	Yonemoto Ni; Japan	Yuan Xiaochao; China
Daoshu+Gunshu	Zhao Qingjian; China	Jia Rui; Macau	Daisuke Ichikizaki; Japan
Nanquan	Lee Seung-kuen; South Korea	Leong Hong Man; Macau	Peng Wei-chua; Chinese Taipei
Nandao+Nangun	Song Lin; China	Peng Wei-chua; Chinese Taipei	Leong Hong Man; Macau
Taijiquan	Wu Yanan; China	He Wenlue; Macau	Kamon Shunpei; Japan

=== Women ===
Event	Gold	Silver	Bronze
Changquan	Chen Min; China	Han Jing; Macau	Ma Lan; China
Jianshu+Qiangshu	Chen Min; China	Han Jing; Macau	Chen Shaoqi; Chinese Taipei
Nanquan	Huang Yanhui; Macau	Erika Kojima; Japan	Chen Shaoqi; Chinese Taipei
Nanquan+Nandao	Chen Yanping; China	Huang Yanhui; Macau	Liang Hongmin; Chinese Taipei
Taijiquan	Cui Wenjuan; China	Fan Man-yun; Chinese Taipei	Ai Miyaoka; Japan
