= Kang Yun-mi (gymnast) =

North Korean artistic gymnast (born 1988)

- Born: 11 February 1988 (age 38)
- Height: 144 cm (4 ft 9 in)

Gymnastics career
- Discipline: Women's artistic gymnastics
- Country represented: North Korea
- Club: Pyongyang City Club
- Head coach: Kim Chun-pil
Medal record
Women's artistic gymnastics
Representing North Korea
World Championships
| Silver medal – second place | 2003 Anaheim | Vault |
World University Games
| Silver medal – second place | 2005 İzmir | Team |

- Kang Yun-mi
- Hangul: 강윤미
- RR: Gang Yunmi
- MR: Kang Yunmi

Kang Yun-mi (born 11 February 1988) is a North Korean former artistic gymnast. She is primarily a vault specialist and is the 2003 World silver medalist on that apparatus. She represented North Korea at the 2004 Summer Olympics and placed fifth in the vault final. She was one of the few gymnasts to perform the difficult Amanar vault.

== Gymnastics career ==
Kang competed at the 2003 World Championships, where she performed the Amanar vault to win the silver medal, tied with Elena Zamolodchikova and behind Oksana Chusovitina, with an average score of 9.443. Additionally, she helped North Korea finish 12th in the team qualifications to earn a full team berth to the 2004 Summer Olympics. She also competed on the uneven bars and floor exercise at the qualifications but did not advance into either final.

Kang was selected to represent North Korea at the 2004 Summer Olympics alongside Han Jong-ok, Hong Su-jong, Kim Un-jong, Ri Hae-yon, and Pyon Kwang-sun. She competed on the vault and the floor exercise in the qualifications to help the team place 12th. She finished 57th on the floor exercise and did not advance into that apparatus final. She advanced into the vault final, where she ultimately placed fifth with an average score of 9.381.

At the 2005 Summer Universiade, Kang helped North Korea win the team silver medal, behind China. She also advanced into the vault final and finished fifth after a fall. She then competed at the 2005 East Asian Games, where North Korea won the team bronze medal. She won the gold medal in the vault final, ahead of Cheng Fei and Hong Su-jong, with an average score of 9.306.
