= Kang Yun-mi =

Kang Yun-mi may refer to:

- Kang Yun-mi (speed skater) (born 1988), South Korean short track speed skater
- Kang Yun-mi (gymnast) (born 1988), North Korean artistic gymnast
