= Gymnastics at the 2005 National Games of China =

The gymnastics events at the 2005 National Games of China were held in Nanjing.

== Men's events ==
Event	Gold		Silver		Bronze	
Team all-around	Feng Jing; Li Junhao; Li Peng; Liang Fuliang; Lu Yufu; Mo Zhi; Wang Heng	Guangdong	Huang Xu; Liu Dinghe; Liu Junyu; Lü Bo; Tong Yingjie; Wang Zhe; Wu Xiang	Jiangsu	Chen Lei; Deng Weiwei; Deng Yuhui; Dong Zhendong; Li Dezhi; Xiao Qin; Zhu Junjie	PLA
Individual all-around	Lü Bo	Jiangsu	Yang Wei	Hubei	Feng Jing	Guangdong
Floor	Liang Fuliang	Guangdong	Zou Kai	Sichuan	Du Min	Hubei
Pommel horse	Xiao Qin	PLA	Teng Haibin	Beijing	Zhang Hongtao	Jiangxi
Rings	Huang Xu	Jiangsu	Dong Zhen	Tianjin	Yan Mingyong	Shanghai
Vault	Li Xiaopeng	Hunan	Lu Bin	Jiangxi	Du Wei	Guizhou
Parallel bars	Li Xiaopeng	Hunan	Feng Zhe	Sichuan	Dong Zhendong	PLA
Horizontal bar	Chong Wei	Beijing	Xing Aowei	Shandong	Li Guangyao	Shanghai

== Women's events ==
Event	Gold		Silver		Bronze	
Team all-around	Chen Miaojie; Huang Lu; Li Qiong; Li Shanshan; Liu Juan; Peng Xiangjie; Zhang Yufei	Guangdong	Han Bing; Liao Huifan; Liu Hou; Liu Li; Zhang Pin; Zhang Yazhen; Zhu Sangsang	Hunan	Deng Ying; Gao Yao; Liu Nanxi; Lu Bobo; Wu Jiaojiao; Wu Jun; Xiang Xuelei	Jiangsu
Individual all-around	Fan Ye	Hebei	Cheng Fei	Hubei	Zhang Nan	Beijing
Vault	Cheng Fei	Hubei	Deng Ying	Jiangsu	Deng Shaojie	Shanxi
Uneven bars	Zhang Yufei	Guangdong	Huang Lu	Guangdong	He Ning	Zhejiang
Balance beam	Han Bing	Hunan	Zhang Nan	Beijing	Zhang Yufei	Guangdong
Floor	Zhang Nan	Beijing	Fan Ye	Hebei	Cheng Fei	Hubei
