= Han Jong-ok =

North Korean artistic gymnast (born 1986)

- Born: 28 August 1986 (age 40)
- Height: 148 cm (4 ft 10 in)

Gymnastics career
- Discipline: Women's artistic gymnastics
- Country represented: North Korea
- Club: Kigwancha Club
Medal record
Representing North Korea
Asian Games
Gold medal – first place	2002 Busan	Uneven bars
Silver medal – second place	2002 Busan	Team
World University Games
Silver medal – second place	2005 İzmir	Team
Silver medal – second place	2005 İzmir	Uneven bars

Korean name
- Hangul: 한정옥
- RR: Han Jeongok
- MR: Han Chŏngok

Han Jong-ok (Korean: 한정옥; born 28 August 1986) is a North Korean former artistic gymnast. She is the 2002 Asian Games uneven bars champion and team silver medalist. She won two silver medals at the 2005 Summer Universiade, and she participated at the 2004 Summer Olympics and the 2003 World Artistic Gymnastics Championships.

== Gymnastics career ==
Han contributed on the uneven bars and the floor exercise toward North Korea's silver medal finish behind China at the 2002 Asian Games. Additionally, she advanced to the uneven bars final, where she tied with China's Zhang Nan for the gold medal with a score of 9.500. At the 2003 World Championships, she competed on the vault, uneven bars, and balance beam to help North Korea finish 12th in the team qualifications to earn a full team berth to the 2004 Summer Olympics. She did not advance into any individual finals.

Han was selected to represent North Korea at the 2004 Summer Olympics alongside Kim Un-jong, Hong Su-jong, Kang Yun-mi, Ri Hae-yon, and Pyon Kwang-sun. She competed on the uneven bars and the balance beam in the qualification round, helping the team place 12th. Her best individual result was on the uneven bars, where she scored 9.537 and placed 17th in the qualifications, but she did not advance into any finals.

Han competed with the team that won the silver medal behind China at the 2005 Summer Universiade. Additionally, she won a silver medal on the uneven bars, behind Beth Tweddle. She then competed at the 2005 East Asian Games, where North Korea won a bronze medal in the team event, behind China and Japan. In the uneven bars final, she tied with Japan's Mayu Kuroda for the bronze medal with a score of 9.662.
