= Ri Se-gwang =

North Korean artistic gymnast

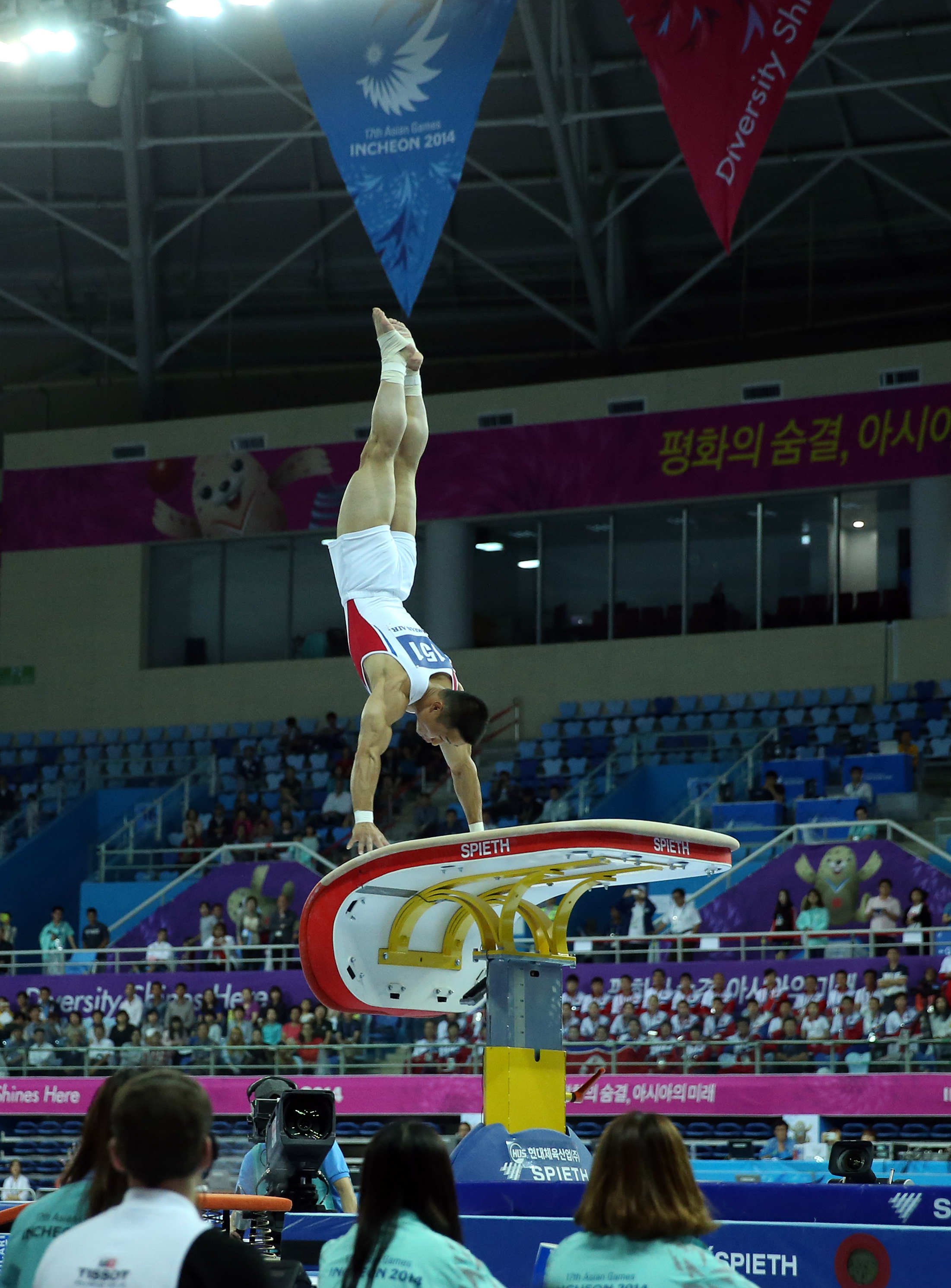
- Full name: Ri Se-gwang
- Born: January 21, 1985 (age 41) South Hamgyong, North Korea
- Height: 155 cm (5 ft 1 in)

Gymnastics career
- Discipline: Men's artistic gymnastics
- Country represented: North Korea; (2006–2020)
- Club: April 25 Sports Club
- Eponymous skills: Ri Se Gwang (vault): full-twisting double Tsukahara; Ri Se Gwang 2 (vault): front handspring double piked ½ turn
Medal record
Event	1st	2nd	3rd
Olympic Games	1	0	0
World Championships	3	0	1
Asian Games	1	0	0
Asian Championships	2	1	1
Summer Universiade	0	1	1
East Asian Games	0	0	1
Total	7	2	4
Men's artistic gymnastics
Representing North Korea
Olympic Games
Gold medal – first place	2016 Rio de Janeiro	Vault
World Championships
Gold medal – first place	2014 Nanning	Vault
Gold medal – first place	2015 Glasgow	Vault
Gold medal – first place	2018 Doha	Vault
Bronze medal – third place	2007 Stuttgart	Vault
Asian Games
Gold medal – first place	2006 Doha	Vault
Asian Championships
Gold medal – first place	2012 Putian	Vault
Gold medal – first place	2012 Putian	Rings
Silver medal – second place	2006 Surat	Vault
Bronze medal – third place	2012 Putian	Team
Summer Universiade
Silver medal – second place	2009 Belgrade	Floor Exercise
Bronze medal – third place	2009 Belgrade	Rings
East Asian Games
Bronze medal – third place	2005 Macau	Vault

- Ri Se-gwang
- Hangul: 리세광
- Hanja: 李世光
- RR: Ri Segwang
- MR: Ri Segwang

Ri Se-gwang (Korean: 리세광; born January 21, 1985) is a retired North Korean artistic gymnast, representing the April 25 Sports Club. He is often considered a specialist on vault apparatus in the sport of men’s artistic gymnastics (MAG).

== Career ==
Ri was the first North Korean ever to win a gold medal on vault at the Asian Games, where he performed solidly at the 2006 Asian Games and was the first one for North Korea on that apparatus. He later went on to win a bronze medal on vault at the 2007 World Artistic Gymnastics Championships.

In 2009, Ri successfully performed an extremely difficult new vault, a Tsukahara (1/4 entry in the first flight) on the vaulting table, followed by a full twisting double backwards salto in tuck position. The new vault is named after Ri. The vault, now officially named the Ri Se Gwang, was valued a difficulty score of 7.2 and the second highest difficulty value in the world, with Yang Hak Seon's vault the Yang Hak Seon (front handspring triple twist) being the most difficult with a 7.4 start value in the previous 2009-2012 Code of Points (CoP) of the International Gymnastics Federation (FIG) for MAG.

Ri competed in the 2009 World Artistic Gymnastics Championships and qualified first for the individual vault final. He finished in seventh place in that event final after a fall on his first vault and going out of bounds on his second vault, with an average score of 15.650.

Together with the entire North Korean delegation team, Ri was banned from competing in artistic gymnastics at the 2012 London Olympics due to persistent issues with regards to age falsification accusations of their female gymnasts. The two-year ban ended on October 5, 2012, which came too late to try make that cycle's August Olympic Games.

At the 2014 Asian Games, Ri qualified in first place ahead of the 2012 Olympic champion on vault, Yang Hak Seon of South Korea, but finished just missing the bronze medal by the narrowest of margins (0.001) with an average combined score of 14.799 on the individual vault event behind Shek Wai Hung of Hong Kong (15.216), Yang Hak Seon (15.200) and Hung Xi of China (14.800).

At the 2014 World Artistic Gymnastics Championships held in Nanning, China, Ri defeated the reigning World and Olympic Champion Yang Hak Seon after Yang crashed in both his vaults during the event final, and won the gold medal with an average combined score of 15.413 ahead of Ihor Radivilov of Ukraine (15.333), 2012 Olympic bronze medalist on vault, and Jacob Dalton from the United States (15.199). Ri won thanks to the quad's highest difficulty scores of 6.4 assigned to both his vaults, and despite incurring a 0.3 penalty for stepping out-of-bounds in his second vault.

On November 1, 2015, Ri participated in the 2015 World Artistic Gymnastics Championships in Glasgow, Scotland, and successfully defended his individual vault title. He won with an average combined scored of 15.450 ahead of veteran Marian Drăgulescu of Romania (15.400) and Donnell Whittenburg of the United States (15.350).

With the defending 2012 Olympic vault champion Yang Hak Seon of South Korea out injured, Ri won gold in the individual vault final at the 2016 Summer Olympics in Rio de Janeiro.

At the 2018 Asian Games, Ri qualified in sixth place and finished in fifth place with an average combined score of 13.400 on the individual vault event behind the 2014 defending Asian Games champion on vault, Shek Wai Hung of Hong Kong (14.612), who also qualified for the 2018 individual vault event final in first place.

At the 2018 World Artistic Gymnastics Championships, Ri won gold with two of the highest 6.0 difficulty vaults and an average combined score of 14.933 ahead of Artur Dalaloyan of Russia (14.883) and Kenzō Shirai of Japan (14.675).

The FIG announced in February 2020 that Ri had retired from gymnastics.

== Competitive history ==
Year	Competition	All-Around		Individual (Ind.) Apparatuses					
Year	Competition	Team	Ind.	FX	PH	SR	VT	PB	HB
2005	East Asian Games						3rd place, bronze medalist(s)		
2006	Asian Championships						2nd place, silver medalist(s)		
2006	Asian Games						1st place, gold medalist(s)		
2007
2007	World Championships						3rd place, bronze medalist(s)		
2009	Summer Universiade			2nd place, silver medalist(s)		3rd place, bronze medalist(s)			
2009	World Championships	—N/a					7		
2011	North Korea banned from international competition								
2012	North Korea banned from international competition								
2014	Asian Games						4		
2014	World Championships						1st place, gold medalist(s)		
2015							1st place, gold medalist(s)		
2015	World Championships						1st place, gold medalist(s)		
2016							1st place, gold medalist(s)		
2016	Olympic Games						1st place, gold medalist(s)		
2018							1st place, gold medalist(s)		
2018	World Championships						1st place, gold medalist(s)		
2018	Asian Games						5		

== Eponymous skills ==
Ri is the only gymnast to currently own more than one (two) of only five most difficult vaults to have officially been awarded the highest difficulty score (D-score) of 6.0 by the governing body of all disciplines in competitive gymnastics, International Gymnastics Federation (FIG), in their most recent 2022–2024 Code of Points for MAG.

Apparatus	Name	Description	Difficulty	Notes
Vault	Ri Se Gwang	backward full-twisting double (tucked) Tsukahara	6.0 (6.4 originally)	reassessed for top difficulty to match the Yang Hak Seon on vault
Vault	Ri Se Gwang 2	front handspring double piked salto with ½ twist	6.0 (6.4 originally)	more commonly known as the vault's “Drăgulescu piked” in practice
