= South Korea at the 2005 East Asian Games =

- IOC code: KOR
- NOC: Korean Olympic Committee

in Macau
- Competitors: 302 in 16 sports
- Officials: 95
- Medals Ranked 3rd: Gold 32 Silver 48 Bronze 65 Total 145

East Asian Games appearances
- 1993; 1997; 2001; 2005; 2009; 2013

South Korea competed at the 2005 East Asian Games held in Macao, China from October 29, 2005, to November 6, 2005. South Korea finished third with 32 gold medals, 48 silver medals, and 65 bronze medals.

== Medal summary ==
=== Medal table ===
| Sport | Gold | Silver | Bronze | Total |
|---|---|---|---|---|
| Bowling | 10 | 5 | 7 | 22 |
| Taekwondo | 6 | 1 | 1 | 8 |
| Athletics | 3 | 7 | 12 | 22 |
| Shooting | 3 | 5 | 3 | 11 |
| Swimming | 2 | 7 | 12 | 21 |
| Weightlifting | 2 | 6 | 4 | 12 |
| Wushu | 1 | 3 | 1 | 5 |
| Rowing | 1 | 3 | 0 | 4 |
| Dancesport | 1 | 1 | 7 | 9 |
| Gymnastics | 1 | 1 | 4 | 6 |
| Tennis | 1 | 1 | 4 | 6 |
| Hockey | 1 | 1 | 0 | 2 |
| Soft tennis | 0 | 4 | 1 | 5 |
| Karate | 0 | 2 | 4 | 6 |
| Diving | 0 | 1 | 2 | 3 |
| Synchronized swimming | 0 | 0 | 2 | 2 |
| Basketball | 0 | 0 | 1 | 1 |
| Totals (17 entries) | 32 | 48 | 65 | 145 |
