= Gymnastics at the 2006 Asian Games – Women's trampoline =

Women's individual at the 2006 Asian Games
- Venue: Aspire Hall 2
- Date: 11–12 December 2006
- Competitors: 6 from 4 nations

Medalists
gold medal	Huang Shanshan	China
silver medal	Zhong Xingping	China
bronze medal	Ekaterina Khilko	Uzbekistan

The women's individual trampoline competition at the 2006 Asian Games in Doha, Qatar was held on 11 and 12 December 2006 at the Aspire Hall 2.

== Schedule ==
All times are Arabia Standard Time (UTC+03:00)

Date	Time	Event
Monday, 11 December 2006	16:00	Qualification
Tuesday, 12 December 2006	16:00	Final

== Results ==
=== Qualification ===
Rank	Athlete	Routine 1	Routine 2	Total
1	Huang Shanshan (CHN)	29.20	37.80	67.00
2	Zhong Xingping (CHN)	28.50	37.40	65.90
3	Ekaterina Khilko (UZB)	28.50	35.70	64.20
4	Haruko Hirata (JPN)	28.30	35.20	63.50
5	Anna Savkina (UZB)	27.90	33.70	61.60
6	Yevgeniya Kazakevich (KAZ)	26.60	31.00	57.60

=== Final ===
Rank	Athlete	Score
1st place, gold medalist(s)	Huang Shanshan (CHN)	38.40
2nd place, silver medalist(s)	Zhong Xingping (CHN)	38.30
3rd place, bronze medalist(s)	Ekaterina Khilko (UZB)	36.00
4	Haruko Hirata (JPN)	32.80
5	Yevgeniya Kazakevich (KAZ)	32.70
6	Anna Savkina (UZB)	7.40
