= Gymnastics at the 2005 Summer Universiade =

Gymnastics at the XXIII Summer Universiade
- Venue: Halkapınar Sport Hall
- Dates: August 11, 2005 – August 22, 2005

The Gymnastics competition in the 2005 Summer Universiade were held in İzmir, Turkey.

== Medal table ==
Rank	Nation	Gold	Silver	Bronze	Total
1	Ukraine (UKR)	5	5	5	15
2	Japan (JPN)	5	2	3	10
3	China (CHN)	4	4	3	11
4	Russia (RUS)	3	2	3	8
5	Brazil (BRA)	1	1	0	2
5	Netherlands (NED)	1	1	0	2
7	Great Britain (GBR)	1	0	2	3
8	Chinese Taipei (TPE)	1	0	1	2
9	Canada (CAN)	1	0	0	1
9	Croatia (CRO)	1	0	0	1
11	North Korea (PRK)	0	2	0	2
11	South Korea (KOR)	0	2	0	2
13	Kazakhstan (KAZ)	0	1	2	3
14	Belarus (BLR)	0	1	1	2
15	Italy (ITA)	0	0	1	1
15	Spain (ESP)	0	0	1	1
Totals (16 entries)		23	21	22	66

== Medal overview ==
=== Artistic gymnastics ===
==== Men's events ====
Event	Gold	Silver	Bronze
Team all-around	Japan (JPN)	South Korea (KOR)	China (CHN)
Individual all-around	Hiroyuki Tomita (JPN)	Kim Dae-Eun (KOR)	Takehiro Kashima (JPN)
Horizontal Bar	Hiroyuki Tomita (JPN)	Mosiah Rodrigues (BRA)	Sergei Khorokhordin (RUS)
Parallel Bars	Takehiro Kashima (JPN)	Yernar Yerimbetov (KAZ)	Andreu Vivó (ESP)
Vault	Huang Yihsueh (TPE)	Du Min (CHN)	Yernar Yerimbetov (KAZ)
Pommel Horse	Robert Seligman (CRO)	Aleksey Ignatovich (BLR)	Lin Hsiangwei (TPE)
Rings	Chen Yibing (CHN); Hiroyuki Tomita (JPN)	None awarded	Matteo Morandi (ITA)
Floor Exercise	Brandon O'Neill (CAN)	Liang Fuliang (CHN)	Hiroyuki Tomita (JPN)

==== Women's events ====
Event	Gold	Silver	Bronze
Team all-around	China (CHN)	North Korea (PRK)	Russia (RUS)
Individual all-around	Fan Ye (CHN)	Suzanne Harmes (NED)	Elizabeth Tweddle (GBR)
Uneven Bars	Elizabeth Tweddle (GBR)	Han Jong-Ok (PRK)	Fan Ye (CHN)
Balance Beam	Zhang Nan (CHN)	Fan Ye (CHN)	Elizabeth Tweddle (GBR)
Vault	Evi Neijssen (NED)	Valeriya Maksyuta (UKR)	Marina Proskurina (UKR)
Floor Exercise	Daiane dos Santos (BRA)	Fan Ye (CHN)	Zhang Nan (CHN)

== Medal table ==
Rank	Nation	Gold	Silver	Bronze	Total
1	Japan (JPN)	5	0	2	7
2	China (CHN)	4	4	3	11
3	Brazil (BRA)	1	1	0	2
3	Netherlands (NED)	1	1	0	2
5	Great Britain (GBR)	1	0	2	3
6	Chinese Taipei (TPE)	1	0	1	2
7	Canada (CAN)	1	0	0	1
7	Croatia (CRO)	1	0	0	1
9	North Korea (PRK)	0	2	0	2
9	South Korea (KOR)	0	2	0	2
11	Kazakhstan (KAZ)	0	1	1	2
11	Ukraine (UKR)	0	1	1	2
13	Belarus (BLR)	0	1	0	1
14	Russia (RUS)	0	0	2	2
15	Italy (ITA)	0	0	1	1
15	Spain (ESP)	0	0	1	1
Totals (16 entries)		15	13	14	42

=== Rhythmic gymnastics ===
Event	Gold	Silver	Bronze
Individual All-Around	Anna Bessonova (UKR)	Irina Tchachina (RUS)	Natalya Godunko (UKR)
Individual Ball	Anna Bessonova (UKR)	Natalya Godunko (UKR)	Aliya Yussupova (KAZ)
Individual Clubs	Anna Bessonova (UKR)	Natalya Godunko (UKR)	Irina Tchachina (RUS)
Individual Ribbon	Natalya Godunko (UKR)	Irina Tchachina (RUS)	Anna Bessonova (UKR)
Individual Rope	Anna Bessonova (UKR)	Natalya Godunko (UKR)	Inna Zhukova (BLR)
Group all-around	Russia (RUS)	Japan (JPN)	Ukraine (UKR)
5 Ribbons	Russia (RUS)	Ukraine (UKR)	Japan (JPN)
3 Hoops + 4 Clubs	Russia (RUS)	Japan (JPN)	Ukraine (UKR)

== Medal table ==
Rank	Nation	Gold	Silver	Bronze	Total
1	Ukraine (UKR)	5	4	4	13
2	Russia (RUS)	3	2	1	6
3	Japan (JPN)	0	2	1	3
4	Belarus (BLR)	0	0	1	1
4	Kazakhstan (KAZ)	0	0	1	1
Totals (5 entries)		8	8	8	24
