= Shun Kuwahara =

Japanese artistic gymnast

- Born: October 28, 1981 (age 44) Kumamoto Prefecture

Gymnastics career
- Discipline: Men's artistic gymnastics
- Country represented: Japan
Medal record
Representing Japan
World Championships
| Silver medal – second place | 2007 Stuttgart | Team |
Asian Games
| Silver medal – second place | 2006 Doha | Team |
| Silver medal – second place | 2010 Guangzhou | Team |
| Silver medal – second place | 2010 Guangzhou | Horizontal Bar |
| Bronze medal – third place | 2006 Doha | Parallel Bars |

Shun Kuwahara (桑原 俊, Kuwahara Shun; born 28 October 1981 in Kumamoto Prefecture) is a Japanese gymnast. Kuwahara was part of the Japanese team that won silver medals in the team event at the 2006 Asian Games and the 2010 Asian Games.
