= 2003 Asian Artistic Gymnastics Championships =

International artistic gymnastics competition

- Host city: Guangzhou, China
- Dates: 22–25 November 2003

The 2003 Asian Artistic Gymnastics Championships were the 2nd edition of the Asian Artistic Gymnastics Championships, and were held in Guangzhou, China from November 22 to November 25, 2003.

== Medal summary ==
=== Men ===
Event	Gold	Silver	Bronze
Team	China; Liang Fuliang; Feng Jing; Lu Bin; Li Dezhi	Japan; Yoshihiro Saito; Akihiro Kasamatsu; Masaki Endo; Yasuhiro Ogawa	South Korea; Yang Tae-young; Lee Sun-sung; Kim Dae-eun; Cho Seong-min
Individual all-around	Liang Fuliang; China	Feng Jing; China	Lu Bin; China
Floor	Yernar Yerimbetov; Kazakhstan	Yang Tae-young; South Korea	Nashwan Al-Harazi; Yemen
Pommel horse	Liang Fuliang; China	Lu Bin; China	Shared silver
Pommel horse	Liang Fuliang; China	Lin Hsiang-wei; Chinese Taipei	Shared silver
Rings	Feng Jing; China	Shared gold	Lu Bin; China
Rings	Timur Kurbanbayev; Kazakhstan	Shared gold	Lu Bin; China
Vault	Lu Bin; China	Yernar Yerimbetov; Kazakhstan	Nashwan Al-Harazi; Yemen
Parallel bars	Liang Fuliang; China	Kim Dae-eun; South Korea	Masaki Endo; Japan
Horizontal bar	Yernar Yerimbetov; Kazakhstan	Liang Fuliang; China	Shared silver
Horizontal bar	Yernar Yerimbetov; Kazakhstan	Stepan Gorbachev; Kazakhstan	Shared silver

=== Women ===
Event	Gold	Silver	Bronze
Team	China; Zhang Nan; Fan Ye; Chen Miaojie; Wang Tiantian	Japan; Manami Ishizaka; Kyoko Oshima; Ayaka Sahara; Erika Mizoguchi	South Korea; Jin Dal-lae; Park Kyung-ah; Kim Seol-hee; Kang Ji-na
Individual all-around	Zhang Nan; China	Fan Ye; China	Chen Miaojie; China
Vault	Wang Tiantian; China	Chen Miaojie; China	Wu Ling-yi; Chinese Taipei
Uneven bars	Chen Miaojie; China	Fan Ye; China	Manami Ishizaka; Japan
Balance beam	Zhang Nan; China	Fan Ye; China	Kyoko Oshima; Japan
Floor	Zhang Nan; China	Wang Tiantian; China	Manami Ishizaka; Japan

== Medal table ==
Rank	Nation	Gold	Silver	Bronze	Total
1	China	12	8	3	23
2	Kazakhstan	3	2	0	5
3	Japan	0	2	4	6
4	South Korea	0	2	2	4
5	Chinese Taipei	0	1	1	2
6	Yemen	0	0	2	2
Totals (6 entries)		15	15	12	42

== Participating nations ==
69 athletes from 14 nations competed.

- China (8)
- Chinese Taipei (8)
- Hong Kong (3)
- India (7)
- Japan (8)
- Jordan (1)
- Kazakhstan (6)
- Kuwait (3)
- Malaysia (4)
- Philippines (2)
- South Korea (8)
- Sri Lanka (2)
- Thailand (5)
- Yemen (4)
