= Ryosuke Baba =

Japanese artistic gymnast

- Born: February 4, 1984 (age 42)

Gymnastics career
- Discipline: Men's artistic gymnastics
- Country represented: Japan
Medal record
Representing Japan
Asian Games
Silver medal – second place	2006 Doha	Team
Silver medal – second place	2010 Guangzhou	Team

Ryosuke Baba (馬場 亮輔, Baba Ryōsuke; born 4 February 1984) is a Japanese artistic gymnast. Baba was part of the Japanese team that won the silver medal in the team event at the 2006 Asian Games as well as the 2010 Asian Games. Prior to his silver medal, he was thought of as the future of Japanese men's artistic gymnastics.
