= China at the 2005 East Asian Games =

- IOC code: CHN
- NOC: Chinese Olympic Committee external link (in Chinese and English)

in Macau
- Medals Ranked 1st: Gold 127 Silver 63 Bronze 33 Total 223

East Asian Games appearances
- 1993; 1997; 2001; 2005; 2009; 2013

China competed in the 2005 East Asian Games which were held in Macau, China from October 29, 2005 to November 6, 2005.

== See also ==
- China at the Asian Games
- China at the Olympics
- Sports in China
