= Pang Panpan =

Chinese artistic gymnast

- Born: June 7, 1988 (age 38) Shijiazhuang
- Height: 146 cm (4 ft 9 in)

Gymnastics career
- Discipline: Women's artistic gymnastics
- Country represented: China (2002–08 (CHN))
- Club: National team
- Head coach: Wang Qunce
- Assistant coach: Xu Jinglei
- Music: Tango
Medal record
Representing China
World Championships
Gold medal – first place	2006 Aarhus	Team
Asian Games
Gold medal – first place	2006 Doha	Team
Silver medal – second place	2006 Doha	Floor exercise

Pang Panpan (simplified Chinese: 庞盼盼; traditional Chinese: 龐盼盼｜p=Páng Pànpàn) (born 7 June 1988 in Shijiazhuang, Hebei) is a Chinese gymnast. She was a member of the 2006 World Champion Chinese team.

== Career ==
Pang was selected for and started gymnastic training in 1997 when she was in primary school, and she entered the Shijiazhuang Amateur Sports School. In January 2001, she was selected by Huang Jian, the leader of the Hebei Gymnastics Team, to be a part of the team. Four months after joining the team, she took part in the Li Ning Cup, a National Children's Gymnastics Competition in May 2001. Towards the end of 2002, she was selected for the National Gymnastics Team. She reported for training on January 1, 2003.

Pang had competed in multiple World Cup events in the past, but her best overall performance up until that point was at the 2006 Foshan Chinese National Championships, where she won the all-around and floor exercise titles. This victory earned her a spot to compete at the World Championships later that year, but her spot depended on her performance at the Xiantao Nationals in the autumn.

Though her performance at the Xiantao Nationals was not as good as at the first nationals, she was chosen for the World team.

At the 2006 Shanghai World Cup, she won the title in the beam with a score of 15.600 and in floor exercises with a score of 15.300.

On July 16, 2006, in Shanghai, China, Pang won the gold in the beam.

At the 2006 World Championships, Pang was a member of the Chinese team. She fell on both the beam and the floor in preliminaries, but did well in both of these events in team finals. She was also called up for bars, on which she did exceptionally well, at the last minute when Li Ya messed up her routine in the warm-up session. She and her teammates Zhang Nan, Li Ya, Cheng Fei, Zhou Zhuoru, He Ning, and alternate Huang Lu made history as they became the first Chinese women's team to win a gold medal in the team event.

Pang went on to compete in the all-around and finished 12th in preliminaries. She was in the top three after the first rotation, but in the second rotation, she fell in her Yang Bo (a split jump with a back arch). She continued onto floor exercise, where she earned a 15.425, which put her in first place going into the last rotation. She performed a double-twisting Yurchenko, but landed low, took a step, and placed her hands on the mat, which resulted in a 0.8 deduction. She scored 14.025 and ended up in 6th place.

Bars was her weakest event overall, but due to injury she was only trained consistently in this event during the run-up to the selection of the 2008 Beijing Olympics team. By that time, He Kexin and Yang Yilin were making their presence known, and Pang’s bars were not enough.

== Gymnastics skills ==
In the floor exercise, Pang shows off her twisting capabilities and choreography. On the balance beam, she performs split jumps that arch more than the 180-degree requirement. She is also capable of the very difficult tucked barani (front somersault with a half turn). On the uneven bars, she has made some improvement with her lines and execution, being careful not to bend her arms on swings. On this apparatus, she does a transition from the high bar to the low bar called the Ezhova (named after a Russian gymnast) that is basically a layout barani. On vault, she is capable of performing the double-twisting yurchenko that has a 5.8 A-score in the 2006 Code of Points.

== Competitive history ==
=== 2008 season ===
Year	Competition description	Location	Apparatus	Rank-final	Score-final	Rank-qualifying	Score-qualifying
2008	World Cup/Series	Moscow	Uneven bar	2	15.400	1	15.925

=== 2007 season ===
Year	Competition description	Location	Apparatus	Rank-final	Score-final	Rank-qualifying	Score-qualifying
2007	World Cup/Series	Shanghai	Balance beam	2	15.700		
2007	World Cup/Series	Shanghai	Floor exercise	2	15.050		

=== 2006 season ===
Year	Competition description	Location	Apparatus	Rank-final	Score-final	Rank-qualifying	Score-qualifying
2006	World Championships	Aarhus	All Around	6	59.675	12	58.775
2006	World Championships	Aarhus	Balance beam			11	15.300
2006	World Championships	Aarhus	Floor exercise			30	14.325
2006	World Championships	Aarhus	Team	1	182.200	2	239.525
2006	World Championships	Aarhus	Uneven bar			13	15.125
2006	World Cup/Series	Ghent	Floor exercise	7	13.600		
2006	World Cup/Series	Shanghai	Balance beam	1	15.600		
2006	World Cup/Series	Shanghai	Floor exercise	2	15.300		

=== 2005 season ===
Year	Competition description	Location	Apparatus	Rank-final	Score-final	Rank-qualifying	Score-qualifying
2005	World Cup/Series	São Paulo	Balance beam	2	9.250		
2005	World Cup/Series	São Paulo	Floor exercise	4	9.050		
