= Cha Yong-hwa =

North Korean artistic gymnast

Cha Yong-Hwa
- Full name: Cha Yong-Hwa
- Born: unknown Pyongyang, North Korea

Gymnastics career
- Discipline: Women's artistic gymnastics
- Country represented: North Korea
- Club: Pyongyang Sports Club
- Head coach: Ri Chol-Su
- Assistant coach: Song Kui-Nam
- Choreographer: Song Kui-Nam
Medal record
Women's gymnastics
Representing North Korea
Asian Games
Disqualified	2006 Doha	Team
Disqualified	2006 Doha	Uneven bars
Asian Gymnastics Championships
Disqualified	2008 Doha	Uneven Bars
Summer Universiade
Disqualified	2009 Belgrade	Uneven Bars
Disqualified	2009 Belgrade	Team

- Cha Yong-hwa
- Hangul: 차영화
- RR: Cha Yeonghwa
- MR: Ch'a Yŏnghwa

Cha Yong-Hwa is a North Korean artistic gymnast. She competed at the 2007 World Championships, and represented North Korea at the 2008 Olympic Games, replacing Hong Su-Jong.

At the 2006 Asian Games, Cha received a silver medal with the North Korean team and an individual bronze medal on the uneven bars. At the 2008 Asian Artistic Gymnastics Championships, she won a silver medal on the uneven bars.

At the 2008 Olympics, Cha competed on two events, uneven bars and balance beam, in the preliminary round of competition. On bars, she scored a 15.175, which left her 12th out of all competitors in the meet, and qualified her as the third reserve for the bars event final.

In 2009, Cha competed at the Summer Universiade in Belgrade, winning a bronze medal with the team and a silver medal on the uneven bars. Later in the year, she competed at the World Championships, where she qualified to the uneven bars final and finished in fifth place.

Cha's birth date had been listed as 8 January 1990, but in 2014 the FIG took disciplinary action after discovering that Cha's passport had been modified and her age falsified. Her individual results since August 2006, and the results of any team she was part of, have been nullified.
