= Sun Xiaojiao =

Chinese artistic gymnast

- Born: Zhejiang, China

Gymnastics career
- Discipline: Women's artistic gymnastics
- Country represented: China
Medal record
Representing China
World Championships
Bronze medal – third place	2001 Ghent	Balance beam
World Cup Final
Gold medal – first place	2002 Stuttgart	Balance beam
Asian Games
Gold medal – first place	2002 Busan	Team
Goodwill Games
Gold medal – first place	2001 Brisbane	Balance beam
National Games
Gold medal – first place	2001 Guangzhou	Balance Beam

Sun Xiaojiao is a Chinese former artistic gymnast. She is the 2001 World balance beam bronze medalist. She is also the 2002 World Cup Final and 2001 Goodwill Games balance beam champion. She won a gold medal in the team event at the 2002 Asian Games.

== Gymnastics career ==
Sun won the all-around bronze medal at the 1999 Canberra Cup behind Daniele Hypólito and Maria Zasypkina. At the 2000 International Team Championships, she helped China win the bronze medal behind the United States and Romania.

At the 2001 Paris World Cup, Sun won the balance beam gold medal and the uneven bars silver medal behind Verona van de Leur. She competed at the 2001 Goodwill Games and won the gold medal on the balance beam with a score of 9.662. She also finished sixth on the uneven bars. At the 2001 World Championships, she qualified for the all-around final and finished tenth. Then in the balance beam final, she won the bronze medal with a score of 9.575, behind Andreea Răducan and Ludmila Ezhova. She then won a gold medal on the balance beam at the 2001 Stuttgart World Cup.

Sun won the balance beam silver medal at the 2002 Li Ning Cup. She helped China win the team competition at the 2002 Asian Games. She did not qualify for any of the individual finals. She finished eighth in the all-around at the 2002 Chinese Championships. Then at the 2002 Glasgow World Cup, she won a bronze medal on the balance beam behind Răducan and teammate Zhang Nan. At the 2002 World Cup Final, she won the balance beam title. She finished fifth in the all-around at the 2002 Arthur Gander Memorial.

== Age discrepancies ==
Sun's official birth date for competition was listed as 18 December, 1984, which would make her old enough to compete as a senior in 2000. However, her age has been listed inconsistently elsewhere. A May 2000 profile by Sina Sports gave her birth date as 18 December, 1985; her current curriculum vitae states her birth date is May, 1986. A birth date in 1986 would have made her too young to compete as a senior at international competitions before 2002.

== Post-gymnastics career ==
Sun teaches courses related to gymnastics at the School of Physical Education at the Shanghai University of Sport.
