= Kim Un-jong (gymnast) =

North Korean artistic gymnast

- Born: 13 August 1986 (age 40)
- Height: 145 cm (4 ft 9 in)

Gymnastics career
- Discipline: Women's artistic gymnastics
- Country represented: North Korea
- Club: Pyongyang City Club
Medal record
Representing North Korea
Asian Games
Silver medal – second place	2002 Busan	Team
World University Games
Silver medal – second place	2005 İzmir	Team

Kim Un-jong (born 13 August 1986) is a North Korean former artistic gymnast, who represented her nation at international competitions. She won team silver medals at the 2002 Asian Games and the 2005 Summer Universiade, and she participated at the 2004 Summer Olympics.

== Gymnastics career ==
Kim contributed on all four apparatuses to North Korea's silver medal finish behind China at the 2002 Asian Games. Additionally, she finished seventh in the all-around final and eighth in the floor exercise final. At the 2003 World Championships, she helped North Korea finish 12th in the team qualifications to earn a full team berth to the 2004 Summer Olympics. Individually, she finished 31st in the all-around qualifications and did not advance into any finals.

Kim was selected to represent North Korea at the 2004 Summer Olympics alongside Han Jong-ok, Hong Su-jong, Kang Yun-mi, Ri Hae-yon, and Pyon Kwang-sun. She competed on all four apparatuses in the qualification round, helping the team place 12th. Her best individual result was on the uneven bars, where she scored 9.475 and placed 23rd in the qualifications, but she did not advance into any finals.

Kim competed with the team that won the silver medal behind China at the 2005 Summer Universiade. She also advanced into the floor exercise final, where she finished eighth. At the 2005 East Asian Games, she won a bronze medal in the team event, behind China and Japan. Additionally, she placed sixth in the all-around final, fifth in the balance beam final, and eighth in the floor exercise final.
