= Kyoko Oshima =

Japanese artistic gymnast (born 1986)

- Born: 5 August 1986 (age 40) Tokyo, Japan
- Height: 149 cm (4 ft 11 in)

Gymnastics career
- Discipline: Women's artistic gymnastics
- Country represented: Japan (2002-2012)
- Club: Asahi Seimei Gymnastics Club
- Retired: 2012
Medal record
Representing Japan
Asian Games
Silver medal – second place	2006 Doha	Team
Silver medal – second place	2010 Guangzhou	Team
Bronze medal – third place	2002 Busan	Team
Bronze medal – third place	2006 Doha	Floor exercise
Asian Championships
Gold medal – first place	2008 Doha	Team
Silver medal – second place	2003 Guangzhou	Team
Bronze medal – third place	2003 Guangzhou	Balance beam
Bronze medal – third place	2006 Surat	Team
Summer Universiade
Gold medal – first place	2011 Shenzhen	Team
Pacific Rim Championships
Bronze medal – third place	2002 Vancouver	Team
East Asian Games
Silver medal – second place	2005 Macau	Team
Bronze medal – third place	2005 Macau	All-around

Kyoko Oshima (大島 杏子, Oshima Kyoko; born 5 August 1986) is a Japanese former artistic gymnast. She is a double Olympian, competing at the 2004 and 2008 Olympic Games and has competed at eight World Artistic Gymnastics Championships, the most by any Japanese female gymnast. She is a four-time Asian Games medalist and a four-time Asian Championships medalist.

== Gymnastics career ==
Oshima represented Japan at the 2002 Asian Games and won a bronze medal in the team competition. She competed on the vault and the floor exercise at the 2002 World Championships but did not advance into either event final. At the 2003 Asian Championships, she won a silver medal in the team event and also won a bronze medal on the balance beam, behind Zhang Nan and Fan Ye. She then competed at the 2003 World Championships, where Japan placed 14th in the team qualifications.

Oshima was selected to represent Japan at the 2004 Summer Olympics. She finished 51st in the all-around qualifications and did not advance into any finals. At the 2005 East Asian Games, she won the all-around bronze medal and a team silver medal. She advanced into the all-around final at the 2005 World Championships and placed 19th. She helped Japan win the team bronze medal at the 2006 Asian Championships. She also helped Japan win the bronze medal at the 2006 Asian Games, which was later upgraded to a silver medal after North Korea was disqualified for age falsification. Oshima finished 34th in the all-around qualifications at the 2006 World Championships, making her the fourth reserve for the final. She competed with the Japanese team that placed 12th at the 2007 World Championships.

Oshima won the all-around title at the 2008 NHK Cup, her first time winning the competition since 2002. As a result, she was selected to represent Japan at the 2008 Summer Olympics alongside Mayu Kuroda, Yu Minobe, Yuko Shintake, Kōko Tsurumi, and Miki Uemura. She helped Japan advance into the team finals in eighth place, and she also advanced into the individual all-around final. Oshima competed on three events during the team final to help Japan finish fifth. She then finished 20th in the all-around final. After the Olympic Games, she helped the Japanese team win the gold medal at the 2008 Asian Championships.

Oshima competed on the uneven bars and the floor exercise at the 2009 World Championships but did not advance into either apparatus final. She represented Japan at the 2010 Asian Games, helping the team win the silver medal behind China. At the 2010 World Championships, she finished fifth with Japan in the team final.

Oshima won a silver medal with the Japanese team at the 2011 Summer Universiade. She then competed at the 2011 World Championships, where Japan finished seventh in the team final. She was not selected to compete at the 2012 Summer Olympics.
