= Ri Jong-song =

North Korean gymnast

- Born: 27 January 1982 (age 44)
- Height: 1.58 m (5 ft 2 in)

Gymnastics career
- Discipline: Men's artistic gymnastics
- Country represented: North Korea

Ri Jong-song (born 27 January 1982) is a North Korean gymnast. He competed at the 2004 Summer Olympics.
