= Pyon Kwang-sun =

North Korean artistic gymnast

- Born: 18 November 1986 (age 39) Pyongyang, North Korea
- Height: 1.45 m (4 ft 9 in)

Gymnastics career
- Discipline: Women's artistic gymnastics
- Country represented: North Korea
- Club: Kigwancha Club
Medal record
Asian Games
Silver medal – second place	2002 Busan	Team
Bronze medal – third place	2002 Busan	Balance beam
Disqualified	2006 Doha	Team
Asian Championships
Silver medal – second place	2006 Surat	Team
Bronze medal – third place	2006 Surat	All-around
Bronze medal – third place	2006 Surat	Uneven bars

- Pyon Kwang-sun
- Hangul: 변광순
- RR: Byeon Gwangsun
- MR: Pyŏn Kwangsun

Pyon Kwang-sun (born 18 November 1986) is a North Korean former artistic gymnast. She competed at the 2004 Summer Olympics and finished fourth in the uneven bars final. She is the 2002 Asian Games balance beam bronze medalist and team silver medalist.

== Gymnastics career ==
Pyon competed with the North Korean team that won the silver medal at the 2002 Asian Games. Individually, she advanced into the balance beam final and won the bronze medal. At the 2003 World Championships, she advanced into the uneven bars final and finished in fourth place. She was only 0.012 points away from bronze medalist Beth Tweddle.

Pyon represented North Korea at the 2004 Summer Olympics alongside Kim Un-jong, Hong Su-jong, Ri Hae-yon, Kang Yun-mi, Han Jong-ok. In the qualification round, the team finished last out of the 12 teams competing, but Pyon qualified for the all-around final in 23rd place and the uneven bars final in eighth place. She finished seventeenth in the all-around final, and she finished fourth in the uneven bars final. She was only 0.037 points away from winning the bronze medal.

Pyon helped North Korea win the team bronze medal at the 2005 East Asian Games, but she did not advance into any of the individual finals. She then helped the team win the silver medal behind China at the 2006 Asian Championships. Individually, she won the all-around bronze medal behind Chinese gymnasts Zhou Zhuoru and He Ning. She also won the bronze medal on the uneven bars, behind He and Zhou. She then competed with the North Korean team that finished 13th at the 2006 World Championships. At the 2006 Asian Games, Pyon initially won a silver medal in the team event, but the medal was stripped after the International Gymnastics Federation discovered that Cha Yong-hwa's age was falsified. Individually, she advanced to the all-around final and finished sixth and the balance beam final and finished fifth.
