= Park Kyung-ah =

South Korean artistic gymnast

- Born: 21 July 1986 (age 40) Chuncheon, South Korea
- Height: 154 cm (5 ft 1 in)

Gymnastics career
- Discipline: Women's artistic gymnastics
- Country represented: South Korea
Medal record
Representing South Korea
Asian Championships
Bronze medal – third place	2003 Guangzhou	Team

Park Kyung-ah (born 21 July 1986) is a South Korean former artistic gymnast. She participated at the 2004 Summer Olympics and at the 2002 and 2003 World Championships.

== Gymnastics career ==
Park joined the South Korean national team during her third year of middle school. Her first major international competition was the 2002 Asian Games, where she finished fourth in the all-around final and seventh in the uneven bars final. Additionally, South Korea finished fourth in the team competition. She then competed at the individual 2002 World Championships on the uneven bars, balance beam, and floor exercise but did not advance into any of the apparatus finals. Her best result was on the balance beam, where she finished 31st.

Park helped South Korea win the team bronze medal, behind China and Japan, at the 2003 Asian Championships. Individually, she finished tenth in the all-around. She competed at the 2003 World Championships and finished 66th in the all-around qualifications. South Korea finished 21st in the team competition and earned one berth to the 2004 Summer Olympics, which was given to Park. She moved to the Taereung National Training Center, where the men's national team trained, to prepare for the Olympic Games for one month. She went on to finish 62nd out of the 63 all-around competitors in the all-around qualifications.

Park competed on the uneven bars, balance beam, and floor exercise for the South Korean team that finished tenth at the 2005 Summer Universiade, and she did not advance into any finals.
