= Fan Ye (gymnast) =

Chinese artistic gymnast

- Born: October 23, 1986 (age 39) Baoding, Hebei

Gymnastics career
- Discipline: Women's artistic gymnastics
- Country represented: China
- Retired: 2008
Medal record
Representing China
World Championships
Gold medal – first place	2003 Anaheim	Balance Beam
East Asian Games
Gold medal – first place	2005 Macau	Team
Gold medal – first place	2005 Macau	Balance Beam
Silver medal – second place	2005 Macau	All-Around
National Games
Gold medal – first place	2005 Nanjing	All-Around
Silver medal – second place	2005 Nanjing	Floor Exercise

Fan Ye (simplified Chinese: 范晔; traditional Chinese: 范曄; pinyin: Fàn Yè; born October 23, 1986, in Baoding, Hebei, China. She is a former Chinese gymnast who is coached by Liu Guicheng and He Hua in Beijing. She admires fellow Chinese gymnast Liu Xuan and Russian gymnast Svetlana Khorkina for the longevity of their involvement in the sport.

Fan Ye is best known for her work on the balance beam. Her biggest accomplishment in gymnastics is winning the 2003 world balance beam title. Fan Ye earned a 9.812 for that gold medal performance and has the distinction of having the highest scoring routine at an international elite competition in the 2001-2004 quad.

Fan Ye qualified for the Chinese Olympic team in 2004. These games were a disappointment for her since she didn't qualify for the individual all around or event finals. In the team final, she competed in uneven bars and balance beam. She had a disastrous bars routine when her feet hit the bar on her dismount causing her to fall face first. She scored an 8.537 but redeemed herself slightly on balance beam. By then, and after two falls from teammate Li Ya on beam, it was too late and China ranked 7th that evening.

Fan also had disappointing results at the 2005 World Artistic Gymnastics Championships, but that same year, she won the most prestigious competition in China, the Chinese National Games. There she delivered a solid and beautiful beam routine with even more difficulty than the one she used to become World Champion in 2003.

== Results ==
- 2003 French International: 8th on balance beam (qualification)
- 2003 Cottbus Cup: 6th on uneven bars, 7th on balance beam
- 2003 World Championships: 1st on balance beam, 4th with team, 8th Uneven Bars, 5th All Around (prelims)
- 2003 Asian Championships: 1st Team, 2nd all-around, 2nd on uneven bars, 2nd on balance beam
- 2004 Pre-Olympic Tournament: 1st on balance beam, 5th on Uneven Bars, 8th on Floor
- 2004 Olympic Games: 7th with team
- 2004 World Cup Final: 6th on balance beam
- 2005 Cottbus Cup: 1st on uneven bars, 3rd on balance beam
- 2005 Chinese National Championships #1 (AA, TM, EFS): 2nd All-Around, 3rd Uneven Bars, 1st Balance Beam, 7th Floor Exercise
- 2005 Britain Vs China Dual Meet: 2nd Team, 2nd All Around, 3rd Uneven Bars, 1st Balance Beam, 1st Floor Exercise
- 2005 University Games: 1st with Team, 1st All Around, 2nd Balance Beam, 2nd on Floor, 3rd on Uneven Bars
- 2005 Chinese National Championships #2 (AA/EFS):1st Beam, 1st Floor
- 2005 10th National Games: (China) 1st All Around, 2nd on floor, 4th on uneven bars
- 2005 East Asian Games: 1st Team, 2nd All Around,, 1st Balance Beam
- 2005 World Championships: 5th Uneven Bars, 8th Balance Beam
- 2006 Ghent World Cup: 8th on Balance Beam, 8th on Floor
- 2007 University Games: 1st with Team, 3rd All Around, 1st Balance Beam, 2nd on Floor, 3rd on Uneven Bars

== Start Values ==
(As of the 2001-2005 Code of Points)

- Vault: 9.4 SV full-twisting laid-out Yurchenko
- Uneven Bars: 10.0 SV
- Balance Beam: 10.0 SV
- Floor Exercise: 10.0 SV

== Floor Music ==
- 2004 Lily Was Here by Candy Dulfer
- 2005-2006 Guitarra del Fuego (Guitar of Fire) by Johannes Linstead
- 2007 Simarik by Tarkan
