= Mayu Kuroda =

Japanese artistic gymnast

- Full name: Mayu Kuroda
- Born: February 20, 1989 (age 37) Aichi, Japan
- Height: 145 cm (4 ft 9 in)

Gymnastics career
- Discipline: Women's artistic gymnastics
- Country represented: Japan
- Club: Chukyo University
- Head coach: Mitsuko Nakayama
- Music: Oye Mi Canto by Gloria Estefan
Medal record
Representing Japan
Asian Games
Silver medal – second place	2006 Doha	Team
Pacific Rim Championships
Bronze medal – third place	2006 Honolulu	Uneven Bars

Mayu Kuroda (黒田 真由, Kuroda Mayu; born February 20, 1989 in Aichi) is a Japanese artistic gymnast. She is an uneven bars specialist, and placed 4th in that event at both the 2005 World Artistic Gymnastics Championships and 2006 World Artistic Gymnastics Championships.

She was named to the 2008 Japanese Olympic Team and placed 5th in the team competition.
