= 2005 East Asian Games =

International multi-sport event

IV East Asian Games
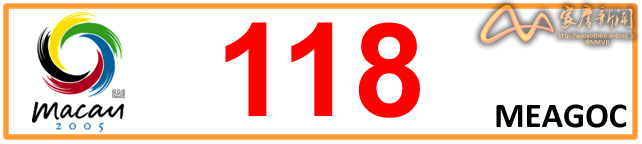
- The license plate with the logo of the Games
- Host city: Macau
- Motto: 東亞風創紀元運動會齊參與; Uma Nova Era para o Oriente Juntos: Vamos Todos Participar; New East New Era, Let's All Join The Games
- Nations: 9
- Events: 233 in 17 sports
- Opening: 29 October 2005
- Closing: 6 November 2005
- Opened by: Vice Premier Wu Yi
- Main venue: Estádio Campo Desportivo

The 4th East Asian Games was an international multi-sport event for countries in East Asia which was held in Macau from October 29 to November 6, 2005.

== Host city ==
At the 11th EAGA Council Meeting held in Guam in March 1996, Macau, then a Portuguese colony was awarded the right and honour to host the 4th East Asian Games.

== Venues ==
- Estádio Campo Desportivo
  - Macau Stadium - Opening ceremony, Athletics, Football
  - Macau Hockey Centre - Hockey
  - Macau Olympic Aquatic Centre - Aquatics (Diving, Swimming, Synchronised swimming)
  - Macau Stadium Pavilion - Weightlifting
- Macau East Asian Games Dome
  - Theatre - Dance sport
  - Arena - Closing ceremony, Gymnastics
- Macau University of Science and Technology
  - Sports Field - Football
- Tap Seac Multisport Pavilion - Basketball
- Bowling Centre - Bowling
- Nam Van Lake Nautical Centre - Dragon boat, Rowing
- IPM Multi-sport Pavilion - Karate
- Macau International Shooting Range - Shooting
- Tennis Academy - Soft tennis, Tennis
- Macau Forum - Taekwondo, Wushu

== Emblem ==
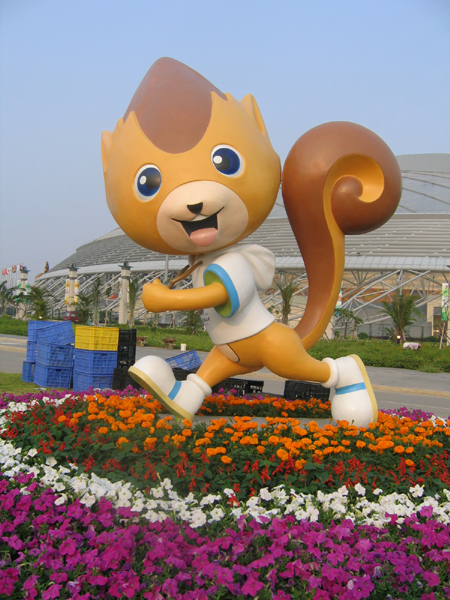
Pak Pak the squirrel as the official mascot

The official emblem is the swirling pattern image of five Olympic colours blue, black, red, yellow and green which represents the Five Elements - Metal, Wood, Water, Fire and Earth as well as Macau as a new era multi-cultural city that fuse the Western and Eastern culture in the East Asian region with strong global influence.

== Mascot ==
The official mascot is "Pak Pak" the squirrel which comes from Guia Hill, a place in Macau which has a lot of fir trees and is the site of the oldest lighthouse on the China coast - the Guia Lighthouse. He is described as friendly, sporty and happy-go-lucky.

== Motto ==
The official motto: "New East New Era Let's All Join The Games" represents the East Asians' powerful energy that generates the new era, new beginning and progress towards prosperity with the rest of the world.

== Theme song ==
The official theme song is "We Will Shine" which represents the value and meaning of persistence, sacrifice and pain and the dreams of the athletes and the celebration of the games as part of life.

== Sports ==
The 2005 East Asian Games featured events in 17 sports, which was a new high for the competition. 11 of them are Olympic sports.

- Aquatics
  - Swimming (40)
  - Diving (10)
  - Synchronised swimming (2)
- Athletics (45)
- Basketball (2)
- Bowling (12)
- Dancesport (10)
- Dragon boat (8)
- Football (1)
- Gymnastics (14)
- Field hockey (2)
- Karate (12)
- Rowing (8)
- Shooting (14)
- Soft tennis (6)
- Taekwondo (8)
- Tennis (5)
- Weightlifting (15)
- Wushu (19)

== Calendar ==
Event competitions	Event finals

October/November	29	30	31	1	2	3	4	5	6	Gold medals
Ceremonies	●								●	
Diving		3	3	4						10
Swimming					8	8	8	9	7	40
Synchronised swimming							1	1		2
Athletics				9	15	13	8			45
Basketball									2	2
Bowling			2	2		6		2		12
Dancesport								10		10
Dragon boat		8								8
Football									1	1
Gymnastics		1	1	2	10					14
Hockey								1	1	2
Karate								7	5	12
Rowing								8		8
Shooting					3	3	3	4	1	14
Soft tennis			2	2	2					6
Taekwondo						4	4			8
Tennis						3	2			5
Weightlifting		3	3	3	2	4				15
Wushu		12	7							19
Total	0	27	18	22	40	41	26	42	17	233
Cumulative total	0	27	45	67	107	148	174	216	233	233

== Medal table ==
* Host nation (Macau)

Rank	Nation	Gold	Silver	Bronze	Total
1	China (CHN)	127	63	33	223
2	Japan (JPN)	46	56	77	179
3	South Korea (KOR)	32	48	65	145
4	Chinese Taipei (TPE)	12	34	26	72
5	Macau (MAC)*	11	16	17	44
6	North Korea (PRK)	6	10	20	36
7	Hong Kong (HKG)	2	2	9	13
8	Mongolia (MGL)	1	1	6	8
9	Guam (GUM)	0	0	1	1
Totals (9 entries)		237	230	254	721

== Results ==
=== Basketball ===
Games	Gold	Silver	Bronze
Men	Chinese Taipei	Japan	China
Women	China	Chinese Taipei	South Korea

== See also ==
- 2006 Lusophony Games
- 2007 Asian Indoor Games
