= He Ning (gymnast) =

Chinese artistic gymnast

- Born: November 13, 1990 (age 35) Linhai, Zhejiang, China

Gymnastics career
- Discipline: Women's artistic gymnastics
- Country represented: China
- Head coach: Lu Shan Zhen
Medal record
Representing China
World Championships
Gold medal – first place	2006 Aarhus	Team
Silver medal – second place	2007 Stuttgart	Team
Asian Games
Gold medal – first place	2006 Doha	Team
Gold medal – first place	2006 Doha	All-around
Silver medal – second place	2006 Doha	Uneven bars
Summer Universiade
Gold medal – first place	2009 Belgrade	Team
Silver medal – second place	2009 Belgrade	All-around
Silver medal – second place	2009 Belgrade	Balance beam
Bronze medal – third place	2009 Belgrade	Floor exercise
National Games
Bronze medal – third place	2005 Nanjing	Uneven Bars

He Ning (simplified Chinese: 何宁; traditional Chinese: 何寧; pinyin: Hé Níng; born November 13, 1990) is a Chinese gymnast born in the province of Zhejiang.

== Competitive history ==
She is known from the 2006 Asian Games in Doha. She won two gold medals in the team and all-around competitions. She was a member of the gold-winning team for the 2006 World Artistic Gymnastics Championships in Aarhus, Denmark, and that was the Chinese women team's first-ever gold medal in team competition in the World Artistic Gymnastics Championships. She was also a member of the silver medal-winning team for the 2007 World Artistic Gymnastics Championships in Stuttgart, Germany.

She failed to make the 2008 Olympic team, while she was the 7th gymnast to be considered as an Olympic team member. Her last competition in 2008 was the Gymnastics World Cup held in Stuttgart, Germany. She won a gold in uneven bars by earning a 15.350.
