= Zhou Zhuoru =

Chinese artistic gymnast

- Born: September 14, 1988 (age 37) Fushun, Liaoning Province
- Height: 147 cm (4 ft 10 in)

Gymnastics career
- Discipline: Women's artistic gymnastics
- Country represented: China
- Club: Beijing Municipal Gymnastics Team
- Head coach: Lu Shanzhen/Liu Qunlin
- Retired: 2009
Medal record
Representing China
World Championships
Gold medal – first place	2006 Aarhus	Team
Asian Games
Gold medal – first place	2006 Doha	Team
Silver medal – second place	2006 Doha	All-around
Summer Universiade
Gold medal – first place	2007 Bangkok	Team
Gold medal – first place	2007 Bangkok	All-around
Gold medal – first place	2009 Belgrade	Team
Silver medal – second place	2007 Bangkok	Uneven bars
Silver medal – second place	2007 Bangkok	Balance beam
National Games
Bronze medal – third place	2009 Jinan	Team

Zhou Zhuoru (Chinese: 周卓如; born September 14, 1988) is an artistic gymnast from Fushun, Liaoning, China.

Zhou was an alternate on the Chinese women's gymnastics team at the 2004 Summer Olympics. Two years later, she competed at the 2006 World Artistic Gymnastics Championships in Aarhus, Denmark, where China won the gold medal in the team event. Zhou contributed routines in vault and uneven bars, scoring 14.450 and 15.150, respectively. She also participated in the all-around final, finishing 12th with a combined score of 58.575.

== Floor music ==
- 2005–06: "Retro" by Vanessa Mae
- 2006–09: "Politics at Work" and "Battle Preparation" from The Myth
