= Miki Uemura =

Japanese artistic gymnast

- Full name: Miki Uemura
- Born: March 6, 1986 (age 40) Arida, Wakayama, Japan

Gymnastics career
- Discipline: Women's artistic gymnastics
- Country represented: Japan (2002-2009)
Medal record
Representing Japan
Asian Games
Silver medal – second place	2006 Doha	Team
Bronze medal – third place	2002 Busan	Team
Bronze medal – third place	2006 Doha	Uneven bars
Bronze medal – third place	2006 Doha	Balance beam

Miki Uemura (上村 美揮, Uemura Miki; born 6 March 1986) is a Japanese former artistic gymnast and part of the national team.

She participated at the 2008 Summer Olympics. She also competed at world championships, including the 2009 World Artistic Gymnastics Championships in London, Great Britain.
