= Manami Ishizaka =

Japanese artistic gymnast

- Born: April 22, 1986 (age 40) Tokyo, Japan

Gymnastics career
- Discipline: Women's artistic gymnastics
- Country represented: Japan; (2006)
Medal record
Representing Japan
Asian Games
Silver medal – second place	2006 Doha	Team
Bronze medal – third place	2002 Busan	Team

Manami Ishizaka (石坂 真奈美, Ishizaki Manami; born 22 April 1986) is a Japanese former artistic gymnast, representing her nation at international competitions.

She participated at the 2004 Summer Olympics. She also competed at the world championships, including the 2006 World Artistic Gymnastics Championships in Aarhus, Denmark.
