= Hong Su-jong =

North Korean artistic gymnast

- Full name: Hong Su-jong
- Born: 9 March 1986 (age 40) or 9 March 1989 (age 37) Hamgyong Province, North Korea
- Height: 146 cm (4 ft 9 in)

Gymnastics career
- Discipline: Women's artistic gymnastics
- Country represented: North Korea
- Club: Pyongyang Sports Club
- Head coach: Choe Kyong-hui
- Choreographer: Choe Kyong-hui
- Music: Grieg Concert by Austria
- Retired: 2012
Medal record
Women's gymnastics
Representing North Korea
World Championships
| Silver medal – second place | 2007 Stuttgart | Vault |
Asian Games
| Gold medal – first place | 2006 Doha | Uneven Bars |
| Silver medal – second place | 2006 Doha | Vault |
| Bronze medal – third place | 2006 Doha | All-around |
Asian Championships
| Silver medal – second place | 2006 Surat | Team |
| Silver medal – second place | 2006 Surat | Vault |
| Bronze medal – third place | 2006 Surat | Floor Exercise |

Korean name
- Hangul: 홍수정
- RR: Hong Sujeong
- MR: Hong Sujŏng

Hong Su-jong (Korean: 홍수정; born 9 March 1986 or 1989 in Hamgyong, North Korea) is a North Korean artistic gymnast. She is the 2007 World silver medalist on the vault. She competed at the 2004 Summer Olympics in both the all-around and the team events.

She is the twin sister of Hong Un-jong.

== Career ==
Hong Su-Jong made the national gymnastics team in 2003. She made her international debut in the 2003 Summer Universiade. She competed at the 2004 Summer Olympics in the all-around, but did not qualify for the final. At the 2006 Asian Games she won a gold medal on the uneven bars, a silver medal on vault and with her team, and bronze in the all-around. She won a silver medal on vault at the 2007 World Championships. She injured herself before the 2008 Summer Olympics and was unable to compete.

Hong was suspended for two years, from late 2007 to late 2009, following a positive test for furosemide at the Good Luck Beijing pre-Olympic test event.

== 2010 age controversy ==
In October 2010, it was announced that Hong Su-jong was under investigation after several discrepancies surfaced over her reported year of birth and age-eligibility for senior competition.

Subsequently, North Korea was banned from taking part in the 2010 World Artistic Gymnastics Championships, as the Fédération Internationale de Gymnastique (FIG) announced it was not satisfied with the explanation provided by North Korea for having entered Hong Su-jong with three different birth dates (1985, 1986 and 1989) in different competitions. In particular, she had taken part in the 2004 Olympics claiming to have been born in 1985; her subsequently announced birth date of 1989 meant that she would have been too young to compete in 2004.

In November 2010, the FIG announced that due to the age discrepancies, North Korean gymnasts were banned from all international competition until 5 October 2012. The North Korean Federation was also fined USD $20,800, and Hong specifically was banned from competing in even national competition within North Korea.

Hong's age has never been officially established, but a video has surfaced in which Hong Un-jong, whose birth year is known to be 1989, states that Hong Su-jong is her twin. If accurate, this would confirm that Hong Su-jong was underage during the 2004 Olympics.
