= Gymnastics at the 2002 Asian Games – Men's artistic individual all-around =

Men's individual all-around at the 2002 Asian Games
- Venue: Sajik Gymnasium
- Date: 1–3 October 2002
- Competitors: 61 from 19 nations

Medalists
gold medal	Yang Wei	China
silver medal	Liang Fuliang	China
silver medal	Kim Dong-hwa	South Korea

The men's artistic individual all-around competition at the 2002 Asian Games in Busan, South Korea was held on 1 and 3 October 2002 at the Sajik Gymnasium.

== Schedule ==
All times are Korea Standard Time (UTC+09:00)

Date	Time	Event
Tuesday, 1 October 2002	15:00	Qualification
Thursday, 3 October 2002	14:00	Final

== Results ==
Legend

- DNS — Did not start

=== Qualification ===
Rank	Athlete	Floor (gymnastics)	Pommel horse	Rings (gymnastics)	Vault (gymnastics)	Parallel bars	Horizontal bar	Total
1	Yang Wei (CHN)	9.600	9.625	9.400	9.750	9.675	9.425	57.475
2	Hiroyuki Tomita (JPN)	9.075	9.625	9.700	9.300	9.725	9.575	57.000
3	Liang Fuliang (CHN)	9.650	9.650	8.650	9.450	9.700	9.400	56.500
4	Lee Sun-sung (KOR)	9.150	9.225	9.600	9.325	9.600	9.125	56.025
5	Kim Dong-hwa (KOR)	9.325	9.475	9.750	9.225	9.750	8.375	55.900
6	Yernar Yerimbetov (KAZ)	8.825	9.250	9.200	9.325	9.700	9.525	55.825
7	Kim Hyon-il (PRK)	8.650	9.750	9.425	9.075	9.725	8.850	55.475
8	Jong U-chol (PRK)	9.150	9.075	9.150	9.200	9.775	8.925	55.275
9	Hisashi Mizutori (JPN)	8.925	9.350	9.050	9.300	9.575	8.900	55.100
10	Yang Tae-young (KOR)	9.200	9.500	9.600	9.125	8.350	9.250	55.025
11	Naoya Tsukahara (JPN)	8.850	8.300	9.475	9.250	9.675	9.250	54.800
12	Stepan Gorbachev (KAZ)	9.275	9.125	8.050	9.300	9.600	8.950	54.300
13	Ri Myong-chol (PRK)	8.850	9.500	9.050	9.000	9.500	8.250	54.150
14	Cheng Feng-yi (TPE)	9.000	8.600	8.400	9.275	9.150	8.650	53.075
15	Lin Yung-hsi (TPE)	8.350	8.975	9.500	9.400	8.725	8.000	52.950
16	Anton Fokin (UZB)	8.200	9.525	8.800	9.325	8.725	8.250	52.825
17	Ng Shu Wai (MAS)	8.700	8.875	8.400	9.400	8.775	8.600	52.750
18	Andrey Markelov (UZB)	8.900	8.750	7.800	9.300	8.400	8.400	51.550
19	Loke Yik Siang (MAS)	8.750	8.300	9.000	9.250	8.725	7.350	51.375
20	Lai Kuo-cheng (TPE)	8.750	7.650	9.400	9.325	8.300	7.400	50.825
21	Onn Kwang Tung (MAS)	7.900	9.250	7.500	8.750	8.350	8.550	50.300
22	Keldiyor Hasanov (UZB)	8.500	8.300	7.850	8.600	8.500	8.200	49.950
23	Ooi Wei Siang (MAS)	8.300	7.500	8.150	9.050	8.500	7.750	49.250
24	Li Xiaopeng (CHN)	9.425		9.100	9.725	9.850	9.550	47.650
25	Teng Haibin (CHN)	8.950	9.700		9.350	9.650	9.750	47.400
26	Takehiro Kashima (JPN)	9.375	9.725		9.000	9.650	9.275	47.025
27	Jo Jong-chol (PRK)	9.425	9.600	9.300	9.300	9.350		46.975
28	Sameera Ekanayake (SRI)	7.750	6.400	7.050	8.400	7.350	7.900	44.850
29	Huang Che-kuei (TPE)	8.300	9.700		8.925	8.675	8.900	44.500
30	Eranga Asela (SRI)	8.200	5.950	6.700	8.400	7.775	7.400	44.425
31	Ruslan Sugraliyev (KAZ)	8.750	8.350		8.950	9.100	7.800	42.950
32	Huang Xu (CHN)		9.625	9.500		9.725	9.350	38.200
33	Kim Seung-il (KOR)	9.450			9.325	9.800	9.325	37.900
34	Yang Tae-seok (KOR)		9.575	8.950		9.575	9.600	37.700
35	Yasuhiro Ogawa (JPN)	9.050	9.450	9.325		9.625		37.450
36	Feng Jing (CHN)	8.825	9.600	9.250	9.350			37.025
37	Kim Dae-eun (KOR)	8.350	9.300	9.500	9.375			36.525
38	Toqeer Ahmad (PAK)	6.600	3.350	5.700	8.500	6.600	5.600	36.350
39	Jong Kwang-yop (PRK)	8.400		9.300	9.275		8.500	35.475
40	Muhammad Akbar (PAK)	5.900	3.350	5.950	7.800	6.800	5.350	35.150
41	Ilya Myachin (KAZ)		8.650	9.200		8.900	7.600	34.350
42	Nashwan Al-Harazi (YEM)	7.900	8.175		9.050	7.750		32.875
43	Esmail Al-Muntaser (YEM)	6.950	6.650		8.700	6.450		28.750
44	Mutsumi Harada (JPN)			9.450	9.275		9.175	27.900
45	Kim Jong-ryong (PRK)		9.400			9.375	8.750	27.525
46	Sain Autalipov (KAZ)	8.825		8.550	8.825			26.200
47	Alexandr Semenyuk (KAZ)	9.000		7.000	9.300			25.300
48	Don Charitha Arachchi (SRI)	6.450	3.800	6.150	8.200			24.600
49	Maki Al-Mubiareek (KSA)	7.900		6.950	8.700			23.550
50	Nayef Dashti (KUW)	7.600	3.600		8.000		4.300	23.500
51	Jonathan Sianturi (INA)			9.250	9.100			18.350
52	Nguyễn Minh Tuấn (VIE)			8.950	9.225			18.175
53	Yu Hung-pin (TPE)		9.250	8.550				17.800
54	Roel Ramirez (PHI)		8.025			8.075		16.100
55	Trương Minh Sang (VIE)		7.450			7.050		14.500
56	Nasser Al-Turki (QAT)	6.450			7.800			14.250
57	Saqer Al-Mulla (KUW)		7.400	6.400				13.800
58	Ahmad Al-Herz (KUW)	7.600						7.600
59	Amornthep Waewsang (THA)			6.550				6.550
60	Lin Yao-hui (TPE)						5.150	5.150
—	Mohammad Abu Saleh (JOR)							DNS

=== Final ===
Rank	Athlete	Floor (gymnastics)	Pommel horse	Rings (gymnastics)	Vault (gymnastics)	Parallel bars	Horizontal bar	Total
1st place, gold medalist(s)	Yang Wei (CHN)	9.300	9.550	9.650	9.600	9.625	9.650	57.375
2nd place, silver medalist(s)	Liang Fuliang (CHN)	9.600	9.675	8.825	9.475	9.750	9.550	56.875
2nd place, silver medalist(s)	Kim Dong-hwa (KOR)	9.375	9.725	9.775	9.250	9.250	9.500	56.875
4	Hiroyuki Tomita (JPN)	9.375	8.750	9.650	9.350	9.675	9.525	56.325
5	Hisashi Mizutori (JPN)	9.050	9.600	9.200	9.350	9.575	9.350	56.125
6	Lee Sun-sung (KOR)	9.025	9.575	9.500	9.375	9.100	9.375	55.950
7	Kim Hyon-il (PRK)	8.875	9.675	9.450	9.300	9.750	8.825	55.875
8	Yernar Yerimbetov (KAZ)	9.150	8.300	9.500	9.600	9.750	9.350	55.650
9	Jong U-chol (PRK)	9.050	9.150	9.100	9.325	9.775	8.925	55.325
10	Anton Fokin (UZB)	8.625	9.125	8.900	9.350	8.650	8.625	53.275
11	Stepan Gorbachev (KAZ)	9.400	8.250	8.200	9.400	9.075	8.750	53.075
12	Loke Yik Siang (MAS)	8.700	8.550	9.250	9.250	8.550	8.250	52.550
13	Ng Shu Wai (MAS)	9.100	9.350	8.450	9.125	8.525	7.800	52.350
14	Andrey Markelov (UZB)	8.775	8.500	8.000	9.125	8.550	8.550	51.500
15	Cheng Feng-yi (TPE)	8.200	8.175	8.600	8.950	8.275	8.450	50.650
16	Sameera Ekanayake (SRI)	8.375	3.750	6.900	8.125	7.700	7.650	42.500
17	Eranga Asela (SRI)	7.850	1.850	6.650	8.400	6.250	7.200	38.200
18	Muhammad Akbar (PAK)	6.550	3.250	6.950	7.850	6.750	5.450	36.800
19	Toqeer Ahmad (PAK)	7.050	1.150	6.150	8.450	6.400	5.650	34.850
20	Maki Al-Mubiareek (KSA)	8.100		6.700	8.725	7.700		31.225
21	Lin Yung-hsi (TPE)		9.050	9.250	9.425			27.725
22	Nashwan Al-Harazi (YEM)	9.100	8.000		9.150			26.250
23	Esmail Al-Muntaser (YEM)	7.550	5.550		8.625			21.725
24	Nasser Al-Turki (QAT)				7.825			7.825
