= Gymnastics at the 2002 Asian Games – Men's vault =

Men's vault at the 2002 Asian Games
- Venue: Sajik Gymnasium
- Date: 1–5 October 2002
- Competitors: 48 from 16 nations

Medalists
gold medal	Li Xiaopeng	China
silver medal	Yang Wei	China
bronze medal	Kim Dae-eun	South Korea

The men's vault competition at the 2002 Asian Games in Busan, South Korea was held on 1 and 5 October 2002 at the Sajik Gymnasium.

== Schedule ==
All times are Korea Standard Time (UTC+09:00)

Date	Time	Event
Tuesday, 1 October 2002	15:00	Qualification
Saturday, 5 October 2002	15:00	Final

== Results ==
=== Qualification ===
Rank	Athlete	Score
1	Yang Wei (CHN)	9.750
2	Li Xiaopeng (CHN)	9.725
3	Liang Fuliang (CHN)	9.450
4	Ng Shu Wai (MAS)	9.400
4	Lin Yung-hsi (TPE)	9.400
6	Kim Dae-eun (KOR)	9.375
7	Feng Jing (CHN)	9.350
7	Teng Haibin (CHN)	9.350
9	Yernar Yerimbetov (KAZ)	9.325
9	Kim Seung-il (KOR)	9.325
9	Lai Kuo-cheng (TPE)	9.325
9	Lee Sun-sung (KOR)	9.325
9	Anton Fokin (UZB)	9.325
14	Hisashi Mizutori (JPN)	9.300
14	Andrey Markelov (UZB)	9.300
14	Hiroyuki Tomita (JPN)	9.300
14	Stepan Gorbachev (KAZ)	9.300
14	Alexandr Semenyuk (KAZ)	9.300
14	Jo Jong-chol (PRK)	9.300
20	Mutsumi Harada (JPN)	9.275
20	Jong Kwang-yop (PRK)	9.275
20	Cheng Feng-yi (TPE)	9.275
23	Naoya Tsukahara (JPN)	9.250
23	Loke Yik Siang (MAS)	9.250
25	Kim Dong-hwa (KOR)	9.250
25	Nguyễn Minh Tuấn (VIE)	9.250
27	Jong U-chol (PRK)	9.200
28	Yang Tae-young (KOR)	9.125
29	Jonathan Sianturi (INA)	9.100
30	Kim Hyon-il (PRK)	9.075
31	Ooi Wei Siang (MAS)	9.050
31	Nashwan Al-Harazi (YEM)	9.050
33	Takehiro Kashima (JPN)	9.000
33	Ri Myong-chol (PRK)	9.000
35	Ruslan Sugraliyev (KAZ)	8.950
36	Huang Che-kuei (TPE)	8.925
37	Sain Autalipov (KAZ)	8.825
38	Onn Kwang Tung (MAS)	8.750
39	Maki Al-Mubiareek (KSA)	8.700
39	Esmail Al-Muntaser (YEM)	8.700
41	Keldiyor Hasanov (UZB)	8.600
42	Toqeer Ahmad (PAK)	8.500
43	Eranga Asela (SRI)	8.400
43	Sameera Ekanayake (SRI)	8.400
45	Don Charitha Arachchi (SRI)	8.200
46	Nayef Dashti (KUW)	8.000
47	Muhammad Akbar (PAK)	7.800
47	Nasser Al-Turki (QAT)	7.800

=== Final ===
Rank	Athlete	Vault 1	Vault 2	Total
1st place, gold medalist(s)	Li Xiaopeng (CHN)	9.775	9.700	9.737
2nd place, silver medalist(s)	Yang Wei (CHN)	9.625	9.725	9.675
3rd place, bronze medalist(s)	Kim Dae-eun (KOR)	9.100	9.525	9.312
4	Lin Yung-hsi (TPE)	9.100	9.425	9.262
4	Yernar Yerimbetov (KAZ)	9.100	9.425	9.262
6	Kim Seung-il (KOR)	9.175	9.325	9.250
7	Ng Shu Wai (MAS)	9.025	9.425	9.225
8	Lai Kuo-cheng (TPE)	9.225	9.000	9.112
