= Gymnastics at the 2002 Asian Games – Men's horizontal bar =

Men's horizontal bar at the 2002 Asian Games
- Venue: Sajik Gymnasium
- Date: 1–5 October 2002
- Competitors: 41 from 11 nations

Medalists
| gold medal | Hiroyuki Tomita | Japan |
| gold medal | Teng Haibin | China |
| gold medal | Yang Tae-seok | South Korea |

The men's horizontal bar competition at the 2002 Asian Games in Busan, South Korea was held on 1 and 5 October 2002 at the Sajik Gymnasium.

== Schedule ==
All times are Korea Standard Time (UTC+09:00)

| Date | Time | Event |
|---|---|---|
| Tuesday, 1 October 2002 | 15:00 | Qualification |
| Saturday, 5 October 2002 | 16:00 | Final |

== Results ==
=== Qualification ===
| Rank | Athlete | Score |
|---|---|---|
| 1 | Teng Haibin (CHN) | 9.750 |
| 2 | Yang Tae-seok (KOR) | 9.600 |
| 3 | Hiroyuki Tomita (JPN) | 9.575 |
| 4 | Li Xiaopeng (CHN) | 9.550 |
| 5 | Yernar Yerimbetov (KAZ) | 9.525 |
| 6 | Yang Wei (CHN) | 9.425 |
| 7 | Liang Fuliang (CHN) | 9.400 |
| 8 | Huang Xu (CHN) | 9.350 |
| 9 | Kim Seung-il (KOR) | 9.325 |
| 10 | Takehiro Kashima (JPN) | 9.275 |
| 11 | Naoya Tsukahara (JPN) | 9.250 |
| 11 | Yang Tae-young (KOR) | 9.250 |
| 13 | Mutsumi Harada (JPN) | 9.175 |
| 14 | Lee Sun-sung (KOR) | 9.125 |
| 15 | Stepan Gorbachev (KAZ) | 8.950 |
| 16 | Jong U-chol (PRK) | 8.925 |
| 17 | Huang Che-kuei (TPE) | 8.900 |
| 17 | Hisashi Mizutori (JPN) | 8.900 |
| 19 | Kim Hyon-il (PRK) | 8.850 |
| 20 | Kim Jong-ryong (PRK) | 8.750 |
| 21 | Cheng Feng-yi (TPE) | 8.650 |
| 22 | Ng Shu Wai (MAS) | 8.600 |
| 23 | Onn Kwang Tung (MAS) | 8.550 |
| 24 | Jong Kwang-yop (PRK) | 8.500 |
| 25 | Andrey Markelov (UZB) | 8.400 |
| 26 | Kim Dong-hwa (KOR) | 8.375 |
| 27 | Ri Myong-chol (PRK) | 8.250 |
| 27 | Anton Fokin (UZB) | 8.250 |
| 29 | Keldiyor Hasanov (UZB) | 8.200 |
| 30 | Lin Yung-hsi (TPE) | 8.000 |
| 31 | Sameera Ekanayake (SRI) | 7.900 |
| 32 | Ruslan Sugraliyev (KAZ) | 7.800 |
| 33 | Ooi Wei Siang (MAS) | 7.750 |
| 34 | Ilya Myachin (KAZ) | 7.600 |
| 35 | Eranga Asela (SRI) | 7.400 |
| 35 | Lai Kuo-cheng (TPE) | 7.400 |
| 37 | Loke Yik Siang (MAS) | 7.350 |
| 38 | Toqeer Ahmad (PAK) | 5.600 |
| 39 | Muhammad Akbar (PAK) | 5.350 |
| 40 | Lin Yao-hui (TPE) | 5.150 |
| 41 | Nayef Dashti (KUW) | 4.300 |

=== Final ===
| Rank | Athlete | Score |
|---|---|---|
| 1st place, gold medalist(s) | Hiroyuki Tomita (JPN) | 9.800 |
| 1st place, gold medalist(s) | Teng Haibin (CHN) | 9.800 |
| 1st place, gold medalist(s) | Yang Tae-seok (KOR) | 9.800 |
| 4 | Yernar Yerimbetov (KAZ) | 9.750 |
| 5 | Stepan Gorbachev (KAZ) | 9.725 |
| 6 | Kim Seung-il (KOR) | 9.650 |
| 7 | Takehiro Kashima (JPN) | 9.600 |
| 8 | Li Xiaopeng (CHN) | 8.950 |
