= Gymnastics at the 2002 Asian Games – Men's pommel horse =

Men's pommel horse at the 2002 Asian Games
- Venue: Sajik Gymnasium
- Date: 1–4 October 2002
- Competitors: 47 from 14 nations

Medalists
gold medal	Teng Haibin	China
gold medal	Kim Hyon-il	North Korea
bronze medal	Takehiro Kashima	Japan

The men's pommel horse competition at the 2002 Asian Games in Busan, South Korea was held on 1 and 4 October 2002 at the Sajik Gymnasium.

== Schedule ==
All times are Korea Standard Time (UTC+09:00)

Date	Time	Event
Tuesday, 1 October 2002	15:00	Qualification
Friday, 4 October 2002	15:30	Final

== Results ==
=== Qualification ===
Rank	Athlete	Score
1	Kim Hyon-il (PRK)	9.750
2	Takehiro Kashima (JPN)	9.725
3	Teng Haibin (CHN)	9.700
3	Huang Che-kuei (TPE)	9.700
5	Liang Fuliang (CHN)	9.650
6	Hiroyuki Tomita (JPN)	9.625
6	Huang Xu (CHN)	9.625
6	Yang Wei (CHN)	9.625
9	Jo Jong-chol (PRK)	9.600
9	Feng Jing (CHN)	9.600
11	Yang Tae-seok (KOR)	9.575
12	Anton Fokin (UZB)	9.525
13	Yang Tae-young (KOR)	9.500
13	Ri Myong-chol (PRK)	9.500
15	Kim Dong-hwa (KOR)	9.475
16	Yasuhiro Ogawa (JPN)	9.450
17	Kim Jong-ryong (PRK)	9.400
18	Hisashi Mizutori (JPN)	9.350
19	Kim Dae-eun (KOR)	9.300
20	Yernar Yerimbetov (KAZ)	9.250
20	Onn Kwang Tung (MAS)	9.250
20	Yu Hung-pin (TPE)	9.250
23	Lee Sun-sung (KOR)	9.225
24	Stepan Gorbachev (KAZ)	9.125
25	Jong U-chol (PRK)	9.075
26	Lin Yung-hsi (TPE)	8.975
27	Ng Shu Wai (MAS)	8.875
28	Andrey Markelov (UZB)	8.750
29	Ilya Myachin (KAZ)	8.650
30	Cheng Feng-yi (TPE)	8.600
31	Ilya Myachin (KAZ)	8.350
32	Cheng Feng-yi (JPN)	8.300
32	Loke Yik Siang (MAS)	8.300
32	Keldiyor Hasanov (UZB)	8.300
35	Nashwan Al-Harazi (YEM)	8.175
36	Roel Ramirez (PHI)	8.025
37	Lai Kuo-cheng (TPE)	7.650
38	Ooi Wei Siang (MAS)	7.500
39	Trương Minh Sang (VIE)	7.450
40	Saqer Al-Mulla (KUW)	7.400
41	Esmail Al-Muntaser (YEM)	6.650
42	Sameera Ekanayake (SRI)	6.400
43	Eranga Asela (SRI)	5.950
44	Don Charitha Arachchi (SRI)	3.800
45	Nayef Dashti (KUW)	3.600
46	Toqeer Ahmad (PAK)	3.350
46	Muhammad Akbar (PAK)	3.350

=== Final ===
Rank	Athlete	Score
1st place, gold medalist(s)	Teng Haibin (CHN)	9.750
1st place, gold medalist(s)	Kim Hyon-il (PRK)	9.750
3rd place, bronze medalist(s)	Takehiro Kashima (JPN)	9.700
4	Huang Che-kuei (TPE)	9.650
4	Jo Jong-chol (PRK)	9.650
6	Liang Fuliang (CHN)	9.625
7	Yang Tae-seok (KOR)	9.600
7	Hiroyuki Tomita (JPN)	9.600
