= Gymnastics at the 2006 Asian Games – Men's parallel bars =

Men's parallel bars at the 2006 Asian Games
- Venue: Aspire Hall 2
- Date: 2–6 December 2006
- Competitors: 68 from 19 nations

Medalists
gold medal	Yang Wei	China
gold medal	Kim Dae-eun	South Korea
bronze medal	Shun Kuwahara	Japan

The men's parallel bars competition at the 2006 Asian Games in Doha, Qatar was held on 2 and 6 December 2006 at the Aspire Hall 2.

== Schedule ==
All times are Arabia Standard Time (UTC+03:00)

Date	Time	Event
Saturday, 2 December 2006	12:00	Qualification
Wednesday, 6 December 2006	17:00	Final

== Results ==
=== Qualification ===
Rank	Athlete	Score
1	Yang Wei (CHN)	16.250
2	Shun Kuwahara (JPN)	16.150
3	Anton Fokin (UZB)	16.100
4	Yang Tae-young (KOR)	16.100
5	Yoo Won-chul (KOR)	16.000
6	Kim Dae-eun (KOR)	16.000
7	Feng Jing (CHN)	16.000
8	Hiroyuki Tomita (JPN)	15.850
9	Xiao Qin (CHN)	15.850
10	Hisashi Mizutori (JPN)	15.750
11	Kenya Kobayashi (JPN)	15.700
12	Yernar Yerimbetov (KAZ)	15.600
13	Kim Seung-il (KOR)	15.550
14	Liang Fuliang (CHN)	15.500
15	Ri Chol-jin (PRK)	15.450
16	Ryosuke Baba (JPN)	15.450
17	Ildar Valeyev (KAZ)	15.400
18	Jo Jong-chol (PRK)	15.300
19	Kim Soo-myun (KOR)	15.150
20	Chen Yibing (CHN)	15.100
21	Ro Chol-jin (PRK)	15.100
22	Stepan Gorbachev (KAZ)	15.050
23	Ng Shu Wai (MAS)	14.900
24	Fadi Bahlawan (SYR)	14.800
25	Trương Minh Sang (VIE)	14.650
26	Huang Che-kuei (TPE)	14.550
27	Huang Yi-hsueh (TPE)	14.400
28	Kim Kwang-chun (PRK)	14.400
29	Sado Batsiyev (KAZ)	14.200
30	Timur Kurbanbayev (KAZ)	14.150
31	Ng Shu Mun (MAS)	14.150
32	Keldiyor Hasanov (UZB)	14.050
33	Hoàng Cường (VIE)	14.050
34	Yap Kiam Bun (MAS)	14.000
35	Amer Attar (SYR)	13.950
36	Hadi Khanarinejad (IRI)	13.950
37	Rartchawat Kaewpanya (THA)	13.950
38	Chang Che-wei (TPE)	13.950
39	Mohammad Ramezanpour (IRI)	13.850
40	Mayank Srivastava (IND)	13.850
41	Vahid Izadfar (IRI)	13.600
42	Ahmad Amir Abdulkafi (SYR)	13.600
43	Ashish Kumar (IND)	13.600
44	Hamid Reza Babaei (IRI)	13.550
45	Huang Tai-i (TPE)	13.550
46	Deepesh Sahu (IND)	13.500
47	Mohammad Daher (SYR)	13.500
48	Rohit Jaiswal (IND)	13.350
49	Ravshanbek Osimov (UZB)	13.200
50	Eranga Asela (SRI)	13.100
51	Mahmood Al-Sadi (QAT)	13.050
52	Thitipong Sukdee (THA)	13.000
53	Mohammad Abu Saleh (JOR)	13.000
54	Ivan Olushev (UZB)	12.950
55	Nasser Al-Hamad (QAT)	12.750
56	Muhammad Afzal (PAK)	12.750
57	Abdullah Karam (KUW)	12.650
58	Uditha Kumara (SRI)	12.600
59	Jad Mazahreh (JOR)	12.450
60	Mohammad Al-Omran (KUW)	12.400
61	Eranda Nadeera (SRI)	12.400
62	Sameera Ekanayake (SRI)	12.300
63	Raja Roy (IND)	11.950
64	Tariq Abu Ayad (JOR)	11.950
65	Faisal Al-Othman (KUW)	11.950
66	Ooi Wei Siang (MAS)	11.650
67	Roel Ramirez (PHI)	11.250
68	Khalid Mahmood (PAK)	10.850

=== Final ===
Rank	Athlete	Score
1st place, gold medalist(s)	Yang Wei (CHN)	16.300
1st place, gold medalist(s)	Kim Dae-eun (KOR)	16.300
3rd place, bronze medalist(s)	Shun Kuwahara (JPN)	16.075
4	Yoo Won-chul (KOR)	16.000
5	Feng Jing (CHN)	15.975
6	Hiroyuki Tomita (JPN)	15.475
7	Yernar Yerimbetov (KAZ)	15.375
8	Anton Fokin (UZB)	15.350
