= Gymnastics at the 2002 Asian Games – Men's floor =

Men's floor at the 2002 Asian Games
- Venue: Sajik Gymnasium
- Date: 1–4 October 2002
- Competitors: 47 from 14 nations

Medalists
gold medal	Kim Seung-il	South Korea
silver medal	Liang Fuliang	North Korea
bronze medal	Kim Dong-hwa	China

The men's floor competition at the 2002 Asian Games in Busan, South Korea was held on 1 and 4 October 2002 at the Sajik Gymnasium.

== Schedule ==
All times are Korea Standard Time (UTC+09:00)

Date	Time	Event
Tuesday, 1 October 2002	15:00	Qualification
Friday, 4 October 2002	15:00	Final

== Results ==
=== Qualification ===
Rank	Athlete	Score
1	Liang Fuliang (CHN)	9.650
2	Yang Wei (CHN)	9.600
3	Kim Seung-il (KOR)	9.450
4	Jo Jong-chol (PRK)	9.425
4	Li Xiaopeng (CHN)	9.425
6	Takehiro Kashima (JPN)	9.375
7	Kim Dong-hwa (KOR)	9.325
8	Stepan Gorbachev (KAZ)	9.275
9	Yang Tae-young (KOR)	9.200
10	Jong U-chol (PRK)	9.150
10	Lee Sun-sung (KOR)	9.150
12	Hiroyuki Tomita (JPN)	9.075
13	Yasuhiro Ogawa (JPN)	9.050
14	Cheng Feng-yi (TPE)	9.000
14	Alexandr Semenyuk (KAZ)	9.000
16	Teng Haibin (CHN)	8.950
17	Hisashi Mizutori (JPN)	8.925
18	Andrey Markelov (UZB)	8.900
19	Naoya Tsukahara (JPN)	8.850
19	Ri Myong-chol (PRK)	8.850
21	Feng Jing (CHN)	8.825
21	Sain Autalipov (KAZ)	8.825
21	Yernar Yerimbetov (KAZ)	8.825
24	Ruslan Sugraliyev (KAZ)	8.750
24	Loke Yik Siang (MAS)	8.750
24	Lai Kuo-cheng (TPE)	8.750
27	Ng Shu Wai (MAS)	8.700
28	Kim Hyon-il (PRK)	8.650
29	Keldiyor Hasanov (UZB)	8.500
30	Jong Kwang-yop (PRK)	8.400
31	Kim Dae-eun (KOR)	8.350
31	Lin Yung-hsi (TPE)	8.350
33	Ooi Wei Siang (MAS)	8.300
33	Huang Che-kuei (TPE)	8.300
35	Eranga Asela (SRI)	8.200
35	Anton Fokin (UZB)	8.200
37	Maki Al-Mubiareek (KSA)	7.900
37	Onn Kwang Tung (MAS)	7.900
37	Nashwan Al-Harazi (YEM)	7.900
40	Sameera Ekanayake (SRI)	7.750
41	Ahmad Al-Herz (KUW)	7.600
41	Nayef Dashti (KUW)	7.600
43	Esmail Al-Muntaser (YEM)	6.950
44	Toqeer Ahmad (PAK)	6.600
45	Nasser Al-Turki (QAT)	6.450
45	Don Charitha Arachchi (SRI)	6.450
47	Muhammad Akbar (PAK)	5.900

=== Final ===
Rank	Athlete	Score
1st place, gold medalist(s)	Kim Seung-il (KOR)	9.525
2nd place, silver medalist(s)	Jo Jong-chol (PRK)	9.450
3rd place, bronze medalist(s)	Yang Wei (CHN)	9.400
4	Takehiro Kashima (JPN)	9.375
5	Stepan Gorbachev (KAZ)	9.125
6	Jong U-chol (PRK)	9.100
7	Liang Fuliang (CHN)	8.975
8	Kim Dong-hwa (KOR)	8.800
