= Gymnastics at the 2002 Asian Games – Men's rings =

Men's rings at the 2002 Asian Games
- Venue: Sajik Gymnasium
- Date: 1–4 October 2002
- Competitors: 46 from 15 nations

Medalists
gold medal	Huang Xu	China
gold medal	Kim Dong-hwa	South Korea
bronze medal	Lai Kuo-cheng	Chinese Taipei
bronze medal	Hiroyuki Tomita	Japan

The men's rings competition at the 2002 Asian Games in Busan, South Korea was held on 1 and 4 October 2002 at the Sajik Gymnasium.

== Schedule ==
All times are Korea Standard Time (UTC+09:00)

Date	Time	Event
Tuesday, 1 October 2002	15:00	Qualification
Friday, 4 October 2002	16:00	Final

== Results ==
=== Qualification ===
Rank	Athlete	Score
1	Kim Dong-hwa (KOR)	9.750
2	Hiroyuki Tomita (JPN)	9.700
3	Yang Tae-young (KOR)	9.600
3	Lee Sun-sung (KOR)	9.600
5	Huang Xu (CHN)	9.500
5	Lin Yung-hsi (TPE)	9.500
5	Kim Dae-eun (KOR)	9.500
8	Naoya Tsukahara (JPN)	9.475
9	Mutsumi Harada (JPN)	9.450
10	Kim Hyon-il (PRK)	9.425
11	Lai Kuo-cheng (TPE)	9.400
11	Yang Wei (CHN)	9.400
13	Yasuhiro Ogawa (JPN)	9.325
14	Jo Jong-chol (PRK)	9.300
14	Jong Kwang-yop (PRK)	9.300
16	Feng Jing (CHN)	9.250
16	Jonathan Sianturi (INA)	9.250
18	Ilya Myachin (KAZ)	9.200
18	Yernar Yerimbetov (KAZ)	9.200
20	Jong U-chol (PRK)	9.150
21	Li Xiaopeng (CHN)	9.100
22	Hisashi Mizutori (JPN)	9.050
22	Ri Myong-chol (PRK)	9.050
24	Loke Yik Siang (MAS)	9.000
25	Yang Tae-seok (KOR)	8.950
25	Nguyễn Minh Tuấn (VIE)	8.950
27	Anton Fokin (UZB)	8.800
28	Liang Fuliang (CHN)	8.650
29	Sain Autalipov (KAZ)	8.550
29	Yu Hung-pin (TPE)	8.550
31	Ng Shu Wai (MAS)	8.400
31	Cheng Feng-yi (TPE)	8.400
33	Ooi Wei Siang (MAS)	8.150
34	Stepan Gorbachev (KAZ)	8.050
35	Keldiyor Hasanov (UZB)	7.850
36	Andrey Markelov (UZB)	7.800
37	Onn Kwang Tung (MAS)	7.500
38	Sameera Ekanayake (SRI)	7.050
39	Alexandr Semenyuk (KAZ)	7.000
40	Maki Al-Mubiareek (KSA)	6.950
41	Eranga Asela (SRI)	6.700
42	Amornthep Waewsang (THA)	6.550
43	Saqer Al-Mulla (KUW)	6.400
44	Don Charitha Arachchi (SRI)	6.150
45	Muhammad Akbar (PAK)	5.950
46	Toqeer Ahmad (PAK)	5.700

=== Final ===
Rank	Athlete	Score
1st place, gold medalist(s)	Huang Xu (CHN)	9.800
1st place, gold medalist(s)	Kim Dong-hwa (KOR)	9.800
3rd place, bronze medalist(s)	Lai Kuo-cheng (TPE)	9.600
3rd place, bronze medalist(s)	Hiroyuki Tomita (JPN)	9.600
5	Lin Yung-hsi (TPE)	9.550
6	Yang Tae-young (KOR)	9.500
7	Kim Hyon-il (PRK)	9.325
8	Mutsumi Harada (JPN)	8.700
