= Gymnastics at the 2002 Asian Games – Men's parallel bars =

Men's parallel bars at the 2002 Asian Games
- Venue: Sajik Gymnasium
- Date: 1–5 October 2002
- Competitors: 43 from 13 nations

Medalists
gold medal	Li Xiaopeng	China
gold medal	Huang Xu	China
bronze medal	Kim Seung-il	South Korea

The men's parallel bars competition at the 2002 Asian Games in Busan, South Korea was held on 1 and 5 October 2002 at the Sajik Gymnasium.

== Schedule ==
All times are Korea Standard Time (UTC+09:00)

Date	Time	Event
Tuesday, 1 October 2002	15:00	Qualification
Saturday, 5 October 2002	15:30	Final

== Results ==
=== Qualification ===
Rank	Athlete	Score
1	Li Xiaopeng (CHN)	9.850
2	Kim Seung-il (KOR)	9.800
3	Jong U-chol (PRK)	9.775
4	Kim Dong-hwa (KOR)	9.750
5	Huang Xu (CHN)	9.725
5	Hiroyuki Tomita (JPN)	9.725
5	Kim Hyon-il (PRK)	9.725
8	Yernar Yerimbetov (KAZ)	9.700
8	Liang Fuliang (CHN)	9.700
10	Naoya Tsukahara (JPN)	9.675
10	Yang Wei (CHN)	9.675
12	Teng Haibin (CHN)	9.650
12	Takehiro Kashima (JPN)	9.650
14	Yasuhiro Ogawa (JPN)	9.625
15	Stepan Gorbachev (KAZ)	9.600
15	Lee Sun-sung (KOR)	9.600
17	Hisashi Mizutori (JPN)	9.575
17	Yang Tae-seok (KOR)	9.575
19	Ri Myong-chol (PRK)	9.500
20	Kim Jong-ryong (PRK)	9.375
21	Jo Jong-chol (PRK)	9.350
22	Cheng Feng-yi (TPE)	9.150
23	Ruslan Sugraliyev (KAZ)	9.100
24	Ilya Myachin (KAZ)	8.900
25	Ng Shu Wai (MAS)	8.775
26	Loke Yik Siang (MAS)	8.725
26	Lin Yung-hsi (TPE)	8.725
26	Anton Fokin (UZB)	8.725
29	Huang Che-kuei (TPE)	8.675
30	Ooi Wei Siang (MAS)	8.500
30	Keldiyor Hasanov (UZB)	8.500
32	Andrey Markelov (UZB)	8.400
33	Yang Tae-young (KOR)	8.350
33	Onn Kwang Tung (MAS)	8.350
35	Lai Kuo-cheng (TPE)	8.300
36	Roel Ramirez (PHI)	8.075
37	Eranga Asela (SRI)	7.775
38	Nashwan Al-Harazi (YEM)	7.750
39	Sameera Ekanayake (SRI)	7.350
40	Trương Minh Sang (VIE)	7.050
41	Muhammad Akbar (PAK)	6.800
42	Toqeer Ahmad (PAK)	6.600
43	Esmail Al-Muntaser (YEM)	6.450

=== Final ===
Rank	Athlete	Score
1st place, gold medalist(s)	Li Xiaopeng (CHN)	9.800
1st place, gold medalist(s)	Huang Xu (CHN)	9.800
3rd place, bronze medalist(s)	Kim Seung-il (KOR)	9.750
4	Yernar Yerimbetov (KAZ)	9.700
4	Kim Hyon-il (PRK)	9.700
6	Kim Dong-hwa (KOR)	9.625
7	Jong U-chol (PRK)	9.475
8	Hiroyuki Tomita (JPN)	8.750
