= Gymnastics at the 2006 Asian Games – Men's artistic individual all-around =

Men's individual all-around at the 2006 Asian Games
- Venue: Aspire Hall 2
- Date: 2–4 December 2006
- Competitors: 84 from 20 nations

Medalists
gold medal	Yang Wei	China
silver medal	Hisashi Mizutori	Japan
bronze medal	Hiroyuki Tomita	Japan

The men's artistic individual all-around competition at the 2006 Asian Games in Doha, Qatar was held on 2 and 4 December 2006 at the Aspire Hall 2.

== Schedule ==
All times are Arabia Standard Time (UTC+03:00)

Date	Time	Event
Saturday, 2 December 2006	12:00	Qualification
Monday, 4 December 2006	14:00	Final

== Results ==
Legend

- DNS — Did not start

=== Qualification ===
Rank	Athlete	Floor (gymnastics)	Pommel horse	Rings (gymnastics)	Vault (gymnastics)	Parallel bars	Horizontal bar	Total
1	Yang Wei (CHN)	14.950	15.700	16.300	16.800	16.250	15.650	95.650
2	Hiroyuki Tomita (JPN)	15.100	15.350	15.950	16.300	15.850	15.950	94.500
3	Chen Yibing (CHN)	15.000	15.100	16.600	16.250	15.100	15.250	93.300
4	Hisashi Mizutori (JPN)	14.800	15.050	15.350	16.250	15.750	15.850	93.050
5	Kim Seung-il (KOR)	15.100	14.100	14.900	15.900	15.550	15.750	91.300
6	Kenya Kobayashi (JPN)	14.350	15.150	15.000	16.250	15.700	14.550	91.000
7	Feng Jing (CHN)	14.550	13.750	15.350	16.200	16.000	15.100	90.950
8	Kim Soo-myun (KOR)	15.350	15.450	14.000	15.700	15.150	15.250	90.900
9	Jo Jong-chol (PRK)	15.100	15.250	14.500	15.750	15.300	14.300	90.200
10	Anton Fokin (UZB)	14.000	14.050	15.050	15.700	16.100	14.900	89.800
11	Ri Chol-jin (PRK)	14.250	15.050	14.500	15.450	15.450	14.600	89.300
12	Ro Chol-jin (PRK)	14.000	14.250	14.900	15.650	15.100	15.150	89.050
13	Huang Che-kuei (TPE)	13.350	15.550	14.700	15.700	14.550	14.650	88.500
14	Ng Shu Wai (MAS)	13.200	14.250	13.950	16.600	14.900	14.900	87.800
15	Fadi Bahlawan (SYR)	13.850	14.350	14.400	15.750	14.800	14.350	87.500
16	Stepan Gorbachev (KAZ)	15.050	12.800	13.300	14.950	15.050	15.000	86.150
17	Huang Yi-hsueh (TPE)	13.750	12.950	14.150	16.600	14.400	14.000	85.850
18	Sado Batsiyev (KAZ)	14.200	14.250	12.700	15.800	14.200	13.800	84.950
19	Ng Shu Mun (MAS)	13.900	13.050	13.100	15.350	14.150	14.250	83.800
20	Yap Kiam Bun (MAS)	13.650	15.000	12.350	15.000	14.000	13.150	83.150
21	Timur Kurbanbayev (KAZ)	11.500	12.400	15.400	15.700	14.150	13.750	82.900
22	Huang Tai-i (TPE)	13.050	14.450	13.900	14.850	13.550	12.900	82.700
23	Hamid Reza Babaei (IRI)	13.250	13.150	15.050	14.800	13.550	12.800	82.600
24	Hadi Khanarinejad (IRI)	14.050	12.550	13.000	14.950	13.950	13.750	82.250
25	Mohammad Ramezanpour (IRI)	13.100	14.200	12.950	14.900	13.850	13.100	82.100
26	Rartchawat Kaewpanya (THA)	14.000	13.050	13.650	13.900	13.950	13.300	81.850
27	Ooi Wei Siang (MAS)	12.850	13.000	13.650	15.800	11.650	14.300	81.250
28	Amer Attar (SYR)	13.050	12.350	12.600	15.300	13.950	13.450	80.700
29	Ravshanbek Osimov (UZB)	12.950	13.150	12.650	14.100	13.200	13.700	79.750
30	Mohammad Daher (SYR)	12.550	11.600	13.700	15.400	13.500	12.950	79.700
31	Ahmad Amir Abdulkafi (SYR)	13.450	11.900	12.400	15.000	13.600	13.200	79.550
32	Keldiyor Hasanov (UZB)	13.500	12.450	14.000	12.800	14.050	12.700	79.500
33	Roel Ramirez (PHI)	14.250	13.600	10.750	15.650	11.250	12.600	78.100
34	Deepesh Sahu (IND)	12.900	11.900	12.250	13.950	13.500	13.350	77.850
35	Ashish Kumar (IND)	12.650	12.350	12.600	13.400	13.600	12.750	77.350
36	Liang Fuliang (CHN)	15.250	15.350	14.950	16.200	15.500		77.250
37	Mayank Srivastava (IND)	12.600	11.400	11.300	15.100	13.850	12.950	77.200
38	Shun Kuwahara (JPN)	15.000	14.500		15.950	16.150	15.600	77.200
39	Rohit Jaiswal (IND)	12.700	12.900	11.600	12.300	13.350	13.850	76.700
40	Nasser Al-Hamad (QAT)	12.800	12.900	11.250	14.500	12.750	12.450	76.650
41	Sameera Ekanayake (SRI)	13.100	10.400	12.350	15.650	12.300	12.250	76.050
42	Jad Mazahreh (JOR)	13.900	11.250	10.200	15.450	12.450	12.500	75.750
43	Mahmood Al-Sadi (QAT)	12.300	12.000	12.500	12.900	13.050	11.950	74.700
44	Mohammad Abu Saleh (JOR)	12.600	9.650	10.350	15.650	13.000	12.900	74.150
45	Tariq Abu Ayad (JOR)	12.100	12.700	10.700	14.600	11.950	12.100	74.150
46	Faisal Al-Othman (KUW)	13.300	9.850	12.200	14.750	11.950	11.725	73.775
47	Yang Tae-young (KOR)		15.050	14.750	16.050	16.100	11.800	73.750
48	Eranga Asela (SRI)	11.500	11.750	11.400	14.150	13.100	11.700	73.600
49	Mohammad Al-Omran (KUW)	12.600	10.600	11.850	14.000	12.400	11.950	73.400
50	Kim Kwang-chun (PRK)	14.550	14.300		14.850	14.400	15.100	73.200
51	Ivan Olushev (UZB)	12.200	12.400	11.500	14.150	12.950	9.650	72.850
52	Eranda Nadeera (SRI)	12.600	10.800	11.750	14.000	12.400	11.300	72.850
53	Ildar Valeyev (KAZ)	14.250	14.100	14.050		15.400	14.400	72.200
54	Uditha Kumara (SRI)	11.750	12.600	10.000	13.000	12.600	10.700	70.650
55	Muhammad Afzal (PAK)	12.350	9.900	10.000	14.150	12.750	10.700	69.850
56	Abdullah Karam (KUW)	11.600	9.850	9.600	14.000	12.650	11.600	69.300
57	Thitipong Sukdee (THA)	13.350	14.500	13.500	14.400	13.000		68.750
58	Khalid Mahmood (PAK)	11.600	9.650	10.800	13.750	10.850	11.000	67.650
59	Xiao Qin (CHN)		16.200		15.900	15.850	15.550	63.500
60	Kim Ji-hoon (KOR)	15.000	15.500		15.900		15.850	62.250
61	Yoo Won-chul (KOR)	15.050		15.350	15.850	16.000		62.250
62	Kim Dae-eun (KOR)		14.900	15.600		16.000	15.300	61.800
63	Yernar Yerimbetov (KAZ)		14.650		15.900	15.600	14.900	61.050
64	Ryosuke Baba (JPN)		14.500	14.900		15.450	15.500	60.350
65	Ri Se-gwang (PRK)	15.400	13.050	14.550	16.650			59.650
66	Chang Che-wei (TPE)		13.850	13.650		13.950	13.600	55.050
67	Yuki Yoshimura (JPN)	15.000		15.400	16.250			46.650
68	Lin Hsiang-wei (TPE)	14.500	15.300		15.600			45.400
69	Sain Autalipov (KAZ)	13.850		13.300	15.650			42.800
70	Trương Minh Sang (VIE)		14.150			14.650	13.050	41.850
71	Vahid Izadfar (IRI)		14.500	13.550		13.600		41.650
72	Hầu Trung Linh (VIE)	13.200		12.500	15.050			40.750
73	Mohammad Mehdi Gaeini (IRI)	13.550			14.850		12.100	40.500
74	Maki Al-Mubiareek (KSA)	12.500		12.000	15.850			40.350
75	Amin Al-Halali (KSA)	12.050		12.450	14.250			38.750
76	Vivek Mishra (IND)	13.100	10.550		14.750			38.400
77	Jawad Al-Herz (KUW)	13.000	10.250		14.950			38.200
78	Raja Roy (IND)			12.950		11.950	12.950	37.850
79	Zou Kai (CHN)	15.600					15.250	30.850
80	Nguyễn Hà Thanh (VIE)	14.600			15.800			30.400
81	Weng Shih-hang (TPE)			15.000	14.750			29.750
82	Hoàng Cường (VIE)	13.100				14.050		27.150
83	Nguyễn Minh Tuấn (VIE)			14.000				14.000
—	Ri Jong-song (PRK)							DNS

=== Final ===
Rank	Athlete	Floor (gymnastics)	Pommel horse	Rings (gymnastics)	Vault (gymnastics)	Parallel bars	Horizontal bar	Total
1st place, gold medalist(s)	Yang Wei (CHN)	15.050	15.600	16.550	16.600	16.300	15.400	95.500
2nd place, silver medalist(s)	Hisashi Mizutori (JPN)	15.300	15.100	15.400	16.250	15.600	15.750	93.400
3rd place, bronze medalist(s)	Hiroyuki Tomita (JPN)	15.200	15.500	16.000	15.450	15.500	15.600	93.250
4	Chen Yibing (CHN)	15.150	15.000	16.500	16.300	15.300	14.800	93.050
5	Kim Seung-il (KOR)	15.150	15.000	14.700	15.850	14.750	15.400	90.850
6	Anton Fokin (UZB)	14.700	14.100	15.450	15.700	16.000	14.600	90.550
7	Jo Jong-chol (PRK)	14.300	15.700	15.150	15.800	14.950	14.200	90.100
8	Kim Soo-myun (KOR)	14.650	14.850	14.300	15.750	14.750	15.000	89.300
9	Fadi Bahlawan (SYR)	14.850	13.750	14.900	15.650	14.050	13.900	87.100
10	Sado Batsiyev (KAZ)	13.850	14.200	14.250	15.600	14.500	14.000	86.400
11	Ng Shu Mun (MAS)	14.300	13.250	13.450	15.700	14.000	13.900	84.600
12	Hamid Reza Babaei (IRI)	13.600	13.300	14.800	14.800	13.600	13.300	83.400
13	Hadi Khanarinejad (IRI)	14.450	13.900	14.000	12.450	13.550	13.600	81.950
14	Rartchawat Kaewpanya (THA)	12.950	12.850	13.650	13.450	14.550	14.200	81.650
15	Ravshanbek Osimov (UZB)	13.250	13.700	12.750	13.850	14.300	13.700	81.550
16	Amer Attar (SYR)	13.250	12.800	11.650	15.350	12.800	14.000	79.850
17	Sameera Ekanayake (SRI)	13.550	11.050	12.600	15.100	13.750	13.000	79.050
18	Ashish Kumar (IND)	13.850	14.100	12.700	13.250	13.800	11.250	78.950
19	Deepesh Sahu (IND)	13.250	12.650	12.300	13.550	12.800	13.100	77.650
20	Huang Yi-hsueh (TPE)	12.700	11.650	12.700	14.150	13.350	12.050	76.600
21	Nasser Al-Hamad (QAT)	13.950	12.150	11.400	13.800	12.250	12.150	75.700
22	Huang Che-kuei (TPE)	10.900	14.750	11.250	14.900	11.250	11.400	74.450
23	Ri Chol-jin (PRK)		14.450	14.550	15.400			44.400
—	Ng Shu Wai (MAS)							DNS
