= Gymnastics at the 2002 Asian Games =

- Venue: Sajik Gymnasium
- Dates: 1–9 October 2002
- Competitors: 116 from 20 nations

Gymnastics was contested at the 2002 Asian Games in Busan, South Korea. Artistic gymnastics took place from October 1 to October 5. Rhythmic gymnastics took place on October 8 and 9. All Gymnastics events took place at Sajik Gymnasium.

== Schedule ==
Q	Qualification	F	Final

Event↓/Date →	1st Tue	2nd Wed	3rd Thu	4th Fri	5th Sat	6th Sun	7th Mon	8th Tue	9th Wed
Artistic
Men's team	F								
Men's individual all-around	Q		F						
Men's floor	Q			F					
Men's pommel horse	Q			F					
Men's rings	Q			F					
Men's vault	Q				F				
Men's parallel bars	Q				F				
Men's horizontal bar	Q				F				
Women's team		F							
Women's individual all-around		Q	F						
Women's vault		Q		F					
Women's uneven bars		Q		F					
Women's balance beam		Q			F				
Women's floor		Q			F				
Rhythmic
Women's team								F	
Women's individual all-around								Q	F

== Medalists ==
=== Men's artistic ===
Event	Gold	Silver	Bronze
Team	China; Feng Jing; Huang Xu; Li Xiaopeng; Liang Fuliang; Teng Haibin; Yang Wei	South Korea; Kim Dae-eun; Kim Dong-hwa; Kim Seung-il; Lee Sun-sung; Yang Tae-seok; Yang Tae-young	Japan; Mutsumi Harada; Takehiro Kashima; Hisashi Mizutori; Yasuhiro Ogawa; Hiroyuki Tomita; Naoya Tsukahara
Individual all-around	Yang Wei; China	Liang Fuliang; China	Shared silver
Individual all-around	Yang Wei; China	Kim Dong-hwa; South Korea	Shared silver
Floor	Kim Seung-il; South Korea	Jo Jong-chol; North Korea	Yang Wei; China
Pommel horse	Teng Haibin; China	Shared gold	Takehiro Kashima; Japan
Pommel horse	Kim Hyon-il; North Korea	Shared gold	Takehiro Kashima; Japan
Rings	Huang Xu; China	Shared gold	Lai Kuo-cheng; Chinese Taipei
Rings	Kim Dong-hwa; South Korea	Shared gold	Hiroyuki Tomita; Japan
Vault	Li Xiaopeng; China	Yang Wei; China	Kim Dae-eun; South Korea
Parallel bars	Li Xiaopeng; China	Shared gold	Kim Seung-il; South Korea
Parallel bars	Huang Xu; China	Shared gold	Kim Seung-il; South Korea
Horizontal bar	Hiroyuki Tomita; Japan	Shared gold	Shared gold
Horizontal bar	Teng Haibin; China	Shared gold	Shared gold
Horizontal bar	Yang Tae-seok; South Korea	Shared gold	Shared gold

=== Women's artistic ===
Event	Gold	Silver	Bronze
Team	China; Chen Miaojie; Huang Jing; Kang Xin; Liu Wei; Sun Xiaojiao; Zhang Nan	North Korea; Han Jong-ok; Hwang Kum-hui; Kim Un-jong; Kim Yong-sil; Pyon Kwang-sun; So Jong-ok	Japan; Manami Ishizaka; Aya Manabe; Erika Mizoguchi; Kyoko Oshima; Ayaka Sahara; Miki Uemura
Individual all-around	Zhang Nan; China	Oksana Chusovitina; Uzbekistan	Kang Xin; China
Vault	Oksana Chusovitina; Uzbekistan	Liu Wei; China	Huang Jing; China
Uneven bars	Zhang Nan; China	Shared gold	So Jong-ok; North Korea
Uneven bars	Han Jong-ok; North Korea	Shared gold	So Jong-ok; North Korea
Balance beam	Kang Xin; China	Oksana Chusovitina; Uzbekistan	Pyon Kwang-sun; North Korea
Floor	Zhang Nan; China	Shared gold	Kim Ji-young; South Korea
Floor	Oksana Chusovitina; Uzbekistan	Shared gold	Kim Ji-young; South Korea

=== Rhythmic ===
Event	Gold	Silver	Bronze
Team	China; Sun Dan; Zhang Shuo; Zhong Ling; Zhu Minhong	Kazakhstan; Aida Krasnikova; Lola Yeros; Aliya Yussupova; Zaira Zhakupova	South Korea; Cho Eun-jung; Choi Ye-lim; Lee Ji-ae; Yoo Seong-oeun
Individual all-around	Zhong Ling; China	Aliya Yussupova; Kazakhstan	Yukari Murata; Japan

== Medal table ==
Rank	Nation	Gold	Silver	Bronze	Total
1	China (CHN)	15	3	3	21
2	South Korea (KOR)	3	2	4	9
3	North Korea (PRK)	2	2	2	6
4	Uzbekistan (UZB)	2	2	0	4
5	Japan (JPN)	1	0	5	6
6	Kazakhstan (KAZ)	0	2	0	2
7	Chinese Taipei (TPE)	0	0	1	1
Totals (7 entries)		23	11	15	49

== Participating nations ==
A total of 116 athletes from 20 nations competed in gymnastics at the 2002 Asian Games:

- China (16)
- Chinese Taipei (6)
- Hong Kong (1)
- Indonesia (1)
- Japan (16)
- Jordan (1)
- Kazakhstan (14)
- Kuwait (3)
- Malaysia (5)
- North Korea (12)
- Pakistan (2)
- Philippines (3)
- Qatar (1)
- Saudi Arabia (1)
- South Korea (16)
- Sri Lanka (3)
- Thailand (1)
- Uzbekistan (10)
- Vietnam (2)
- Yemen (2)
