= Gymnastics at the 2006 Asian Games – Men's artistic team =

Men's team at the 2006 Asian Games
- Venue: Aspire Hall 2
- Date: 2 December 2006
- Competitors: 72 from 14 nations

Medalists
gold medal	China; Chen Yibing, Feng Jing, Liang Fuliang, Xiao Qin, Yang Wei, Zou Kai
silver medal	Japan; Ryosuke Baba, Kenya Kobayashi, Shun Kuwahara, Hisashi Mizutori, Hiroyuki Tomita, Yuki Yoshimura
bronze medal	South Korea; Kim Dae-eun, Kim Ji-hoon, Kim Seung-il, Kim Soo-myun, Yang Tae-young, Yoo Won-chul

The men's artistic team competition at the 2006 Asian Games in Doha, Qatar was held on 2 December 2006 at the Aspire Hall 2.

== Schedule ==
All times are Arabia Standard Time (UTC+03:00)

Date	Time	Event
Saturday, 2 December 2006	12:00	Final

== Results ==
Rank	Team	Floor (gymnastics)	Pommel horse	Rings (gymnastics)	Vault (gymnastics)	Parallel bars	Horizontal bar	Total
1st place, gold medalist(s)	China (CHN)	60.800	62.350	63.200	65.450	63.600	61.700	377.100
	Chen Yibing	15.000	15.100	16.600	16.250	~~15.100~~	15.250	
	Feng Jing	~~14.550~~	~~13.750~~	15.350	16.200	16.000	~~15.100~~	
	Liang Fuliang	15.250	15.350	14.950	16.200	15.500		
	Xiao Qin		16.200		~~15.900~~	15.850	15.550	
	Yang Wei	14.950	15.700	16.300	16.800	16.250	15.650	
	Zou Kai	15.600					15.250	
2nd place, silver medalist(s)	Japan (JPN)	59.900	60.050	61.700	65.050	63.450	62.900	373.050
	Ryosuke Baba		~~14.500~~	~~14.900~~		~~15.450~~	15.500	
	Kenya Kobayashi	~~14.350~~	15.150	15.000	16.250	15.700	~~14.550~~	
	Shun Kuwahara	15.000	14.500		~~15.950~~	16.150	15.600	
	Hisashi Mizutori	14.800	15.050	15.350	16.250	15.750	15.850	
	Hiroyuki Tomita	15.100	15.350	15.950	16.300	15.850	15.950	
	Yuki Yoshimura	15.000		15.400	16.250			
3rd place, bronze medalist(s)	South Korea (KOR)	60.500	60.900	60.600	63.700	63.650	62.150	371.500
	Kim Dae-eun		14.900	15.600		16.000	15.300	
	Kim Ji-hoon	15.000	15.500		15.900		15.850	
	Kim Seung-il	15.100	~~14.100~~	14.900	15.900	15.550	15.750	
	Kim Soo-myun	15.350	15.450	~~14.000~~	~~15.700~~	~~15.150~~	15.250	
	Yang Tae-young		15.050	14.750	16.050	16.100	~~11.800~~	
	Yoo Won-chul	15.050		15.350	15.850	16.000		
4	North Korea (PRK)	59.300	58.850	58.450	63.500	60.250	59.150	359.500
	Jo Jong-chol	15.100	15.250	14.500	15.750	15.300	14.300	
	Kim Kwang-chun	14.550	14.300		~~14.850~~	14.400	15.100	
	Ri Chol-jin	14.250	15.050	14.500	15.450	15.450	14.600	
	Ri Jong-song							
	Ri Se-gwang	15.400	~~13.050~~	14.550	16.650			
	Ro Chol-jin	~~14.000~~	14.250	14.900	15.650	15.100	15.150	
5	Kazakhstan (KAZ)	57.350	55.800	56.050	63.050	60.250	58.100	350.600
	Sain Autalipov	13.850		13.300	15.650			
	Sado Batsiyev	14.200	14.250	~~12.700~~	15.800	14.200	13.800	
	Stepan Gorbachev	15.050	12.800	13.300	~~14.950~~	15.050	15.000	
	Timur Kurbanbayev	~~11.500~~	~~12.400~~	15.400	15.700	~~14.150~~	~~13.750~~	
	Ildar Valeyev	14.250	14.100	14.050		15.400	14.400	
	Yernar Yerimbetov		14.650		15.900	15.600	14.900	
6	Chinese Taipei (TPE)	54.650	59.150	57.750	62.750	56.450	55.150	345.900
	Chang Che-wei		13.850	~~13.650~~		13.950	13.600	
	Huang Che-kuei	13.350	15.550	14.700	15.700	14.550	14.650	
	Huang Tai-i	13.050	14.450	13.900	14.850	13.550	12.900	
	Huang Yi-hsueh	13.750	~~12.950~~	14.150	16.600	14.400	14.000	
	Lin Hsiang-wei	14.500	15.300		15.600			
	Weng Shih-hang			15.000	~~14.750~~			
7	Malaysia (MAS)	53.600	55.300	53.050	62.750	54.700	56.600	336.000
	Ng Shu Mun	13.900	13.050	13.100	15.350	14.150	14.250	
	Ng Shu Wai	13.200	14.250	13.950	16.600	14.900	14.900	
	Ooi Wei Siang	12.850	13.000	13.650	15.800	11.650	14.300	
	Yap Kiam Bun	13.650	15.000	12.350	15.000	14.000	13.150	
8	Iran (IRI)	53.950	54.400	54.550	59.500	54.950	51.750	329.100
	Hamid Reza Babaei	13.250	13.150	15.050	14.800	13.550	12.800	
	Mohammad Mehdi Gaeini	13.550			14.850		12.100	
	Vahid Izadfar		14.500	13.550		13.600		
	Hadi Khanarinejad	14.050	12.550	13.000	14.950	13.950	13.750	
	Mohammad Ramezanpour	13.100	14.200	12.950	14.900	13.850	13.100	
9	Syria (SYR)	52.900	50.200	53.100	61.450	55.850	53.950	327.450
	Ahmad Amir Abdulkafi	13.450	11.900	12.400	15.000	13.600	13.200	
	Amer Attar	13.050	12.350	12.600	15.300	13.950	13.450	
	Fadi Bahlawan	13.850	14.350	14.400	15.750	14.800	14.350	
	Mohammad Daher	12.550	11.600	13.700	15.400	13.500	12.950	
10	Uzbekistan (UZB)	52.650	52.050	53.200	56.750	56.300	50.950	321.900
	Anton Fokin	14.000	14.050	15.050	15.700	16.100	14.900	
	Keldiyor Hasanov	13.500	12.450	14.000	12.800	14.050	12.700	
	Ivan Olushev	12.200	12.400	11.500	14.150	12.950	9.650	
	Ravshanbek Osimov	12.950	13.150	12.650	14.100	13.200	13.700	
11	India (IND)	51.350	48.550	49.400	57.200	54.300	53.100	313.900
	Rohit Jaiswal	12.700	12.900	11.600	~~12.300~~	13.350	13.850	
	Ashish Kumar	12.650	12.350	12.600	13.400	13.600	~~12.750~~	
	Vivek Mishra	13.100	~~10.550~~		14.750			
	Raja Roy			12.950		~~11.950~~	12.950	
	Deepesh Sahu	12.900	11.900	12.250	13.950	13.500	13.350	
	Mayank Srivastava	~~12.600~~	11.400	~~11.300~~	15.100	13.850	12.950	
12	Sri Lanka (SRI)	48.950	45.550	45.500	56.800	50.400	45.950	293.150
	Eranga Asela	11.500	11.750	11.400	14.150	13.100	11.700	
	Sameera Ekanayake	13.100	10.400	12.350	15.650	12.300	12.250	
	Uditha Kumara	11.750	12.600	10.000	13.000	12.600	10.700	
	Eranda Nadeera	12.600	10.800	11.750	14.000	12.400	11.300	
13	Kuwait (KUW)	50.500	40.550	33.650	57.700	37.000	35.275	254.675
	Jawad Al-Herz	13.000	10.250		14.950			
	Mohammad Al-Omran	12.600	10.600	11.850	14.000	12.400	11.950	
	Faisal Al-Othman	13.300	9.850	12.200	14.750	11.950	11.725	
	Abdullah Karam	11.600	9.850	9.600	14.000	12.650	11.600	
14	Vietnam (VIE)	40.900	14.150	26.500	30.850	28.700	13.050	154.150
	Hầu Trung Linh	13.200		12.500	15.050			
	Hoàng Cường	13.100				14.050		
	Nguyễn Hà Thanh	14.600			15.800			
	Nguyễn Minh Tuấn			14.000				
	Trương Minh Sang		14.150			14.650	13.050	
