= Gymnastics at the 2002 Asian Games – Men's artistic team =

Men's team at the 2002 Asian Games
- Venue: Sajik Gymnasium
- Date: 1 October 2002
- Competitors: 40 from 7 nations

Medalists
gold medal	China; Feng Jing, Huang Xu, Li Xiaopeng, Liang Fuliang, Teng Haibin, Yang Wei
silver medal	South Korea; Kim Dae-eun, Kim Dong-hwa, Kim Seung-il, Lee Sun-sung, Yang Tae-seok, Yang Tae-young
bronze medal	Japan; Mutsumi Harada, Takehiro Kashima, Hisashi Mizutori, Yasuhiro Ogawa, Hiroyuki Tomita, Naoya Tsukahara

The men's artistic team competition at the 2002 Asian Games in Busan, South Korea was held on 1 October 2002 at the Sajik Gymnasium.

== Schedule ==
All times are Korea Standard Time (UTC+09:00)

Date	Time	Event
Tuesday, 1 October 2002	15:00	Final

== Results ==
Rank	Team	Floor (gymnastics)	Pommel horse	Rings (gymnastics)	Vault (gymnastics)	Parallel bars	Horizontal bar	Total
1st place, gold medalist(s)	China (CHN)	37.625	38.600	37.250	38.275	38.950	38.125	228.825
	Feng Jing	~~8.825~~	~~9.600~~	9.250	~~9.350~~			
	Huang Xu		9.625	9.500		9.725	~~9.350~~	
	Li Xiaopeng	9.425		9.100	9.725	9.850	9.550	
	Liang Fuliang	9.650	9.650	~~8.650~~	9.450	9.700	9.400	
	Teng Haibin	8.950	9.700		9.350	~~9.650~~	9.750	
	Yang Wei	9.600	9.625	9.400	9.750	9.675	9.425	
2nd place, silver medalist(s)	South Korea (KOR)	37.125	37.850	38.450	37.250	38.725	37.300	226.700
	Kim Dae-eun	~~8.350~~	9.300	9.500	9.375			
	Kim Dong-hwa	9.325	9.475	9.750	9.225	9.750	~~8.375~~	
	Kim Seung-il	9.450			9.325	9.800	9.325	
	Lee Sun-sung	9.150	~~9.225~~	9.600	9.325	9.600	9.125	
	Yang Tae-seok		9.575	~~8.950~~		9.575	9.600	
	Yang Tae-young	9.200	9.500	9.600	~~9.125~~	~~8.350~~	9.250	
3rd place, bronze medalist(s)	Japan (JPN)	36.425	38.150	37.950	37.125	38.675	37.275	225.600
	Mutsumi Harada			9.450	9.275		9.175	
	Takehiro Kashima	9.375	9.725		~~9.000~~	9.650	9.275	
	Hisashi Mizutori	8.925	9.350	~~9.050~~	9.300	~~9.575~~	~~8.900~~	
	Yasuhiro Ogawa	9.050	9.450	9.325		9.625		
	Hiroyuki Tomita	9.075	9.625	9.700	9.300	9.725	9.575	
	Naoya Tsukahara	~~8.850~~	~~8.300~~	9.475	9.250	9.675	9.250	
4	North Korea (PRK)	36.075	38.250	37.175	36.850	38.375	35.025	221.750
	Jo Jong-chol	9.425	9.600	9.300	9.300	~~9.350~~		
	Jong Kwang-yop	~~8.400~~		9.300	9.275		8.500	
	Jong U-chol	9.150	~~9.075~~	9.150	9.200	9.775	8.925	
	Kim Hyon-il	8.650	9.750	9.425	9.075	9.725	8.850	
	Kim Jong-ryong		9.400			9.375	8.750	
	Ri Myong-chol	8.850	9.500	~~9.050~~	~~9.000~~	9.500	~~8.250~~	
5	Kazakhstan (KAZ)	35.925	35.375	35.000	36.875	37.300	33.875	214.350
	Sain Autalipov	~~8.825~~		8.550	~~8.825~~			
	Stepan Gorbachev	9.275	9.125	8.050	9.300	9.600	8.950	
	Ilya Myachin		8.650	9.200		8.900	7.600	
	Alexandr Semenyuk	9.000		~~7.000~~	9.300			
	Ruslan Sugraliyev	8.750	8.350		8.950	9.100	7.800	
	Yernar Yerimbetov	8.825	9.250	9.200	9.325	9.700	9.525	
6	Chinese Taipei (TPE)	34.400	36.525	35.850	36.925	34.850	32.950	211.500
	Cheng Feng-yi	9.000	8.600	8.400	9.275	9.150	8.650	
	Huang Che-kuei	8.300	9.700		8.925	8.675	8.900	
	Lai Kuo-cheng	8.750	~~7.650~~	9.400	9.325	8.300	7.400	
	Lin Yao-hui						~~5.150~~	
	Lin Yung-hsi	8.350	8.975	9.500	9.400	8.725	8.000	
	Yu Hung-pin		9.250	8.550				
7	Malaysia (MAS)	33.650	33.925	33.050	36.450	34.350	32.250	203.675
	Loke Yik Siang	8.750	8.300	9.000	9.250	8.725	7.350	
	Ng Shu Wai	8.700	8.875	8.400	9.400	8.775	8.600	
	Onn Kwang Tung	7.900	9.250	7.500	8.750	8.350	8.550	
	Ooi Wei Siang	8.300	7.500	8.150	9.050	8.500	7.750	
