= Gymnastics at the 2008 Summer Olympics – Men's artistic team all-around =

Men's artistic team all-around at the Games of the XXIX Olympiad

Medalists
1st place, gold medalist(s)		Huang Xu; Chen Yibing; Li Xiaopeng; Xiao Qin; Yang Wei; Zou Kai	China
2nd place, silver medalist(s)		Hiroyuki Tomita; Takehiro Kashima; Koki Sakamoto; Makoto Okiguchi; Kōhei Uchimura; Takuya Nakase	Japan
3rd place, bronze medalist(s)		Raj Bhavsar; Joe Hagerty; Jonathan Horton; Justin Spring; Kai Wen Tan; Alexander Artemev	United States

Men's artistic team all-around competition at the 2008 Summer Olympics was held at the Beijing National Indoor Stadium on August 12, 2008.

Teams qualified through the general artistic qualification performances. Each team was composed of six gymnasts. Five of those gymnasts performed on each of the six apparatus, and four of those scores counted towards the team total. The eight teams with the best combined scores in the qualification moved on to the team final.

In the team final, each team selected three gymnasts to compete on each apparatus. All three scores counted for the team score; the three scores on each apparatus were summed to give a final team score.

== Qualified teams ==
The eight teams with the highest scores in qualifying proceed to the men's artistic team finals.

Rank	Country	Floor (gymnastics)	Pommel horse	Rings (gymnastics)	Vault (gymnastics)	Parallel bars	Horizontal bar	Team Total
1st	China	60.925	61.200	62.850	65.325	63.300	61.075	374.675
2nd	Japan	61.675	58.625	60.500	64.125	63.150	61.475	369.550
3rd	Russia	60.475	57.400	60.625	64.300	63.100	60.325	366.225
4th	South Korea	61.025	59.450	60.225	63.725	63.650	57.600	365.675
5th	Germany	61.100	58.900	60.000	64.375	61.500	59.800	365.675
6th	United States	59.900	57.325	60.550	63.850	62.300	61.275	365.200
7th	France	59.025	55.825	58.975	64.650	62.175	60.550	361.200
8th	Romania	61.175	55.900	59.850	65.325	60.050	57.050	359.350

== Final ==
Rank	Country	Floor (gymnastics)	Pommel horse	Rings (gymnastics)	Vault (gymnastics)	Parallel bars	Horizontal bar	Total
	China	45.925 (6)	46.025 (1)	48.875 (1)	49.325 (1)	49.025 (1)	46.950 (1)	286.125
	Chen Yibing	14.575		16.575	15.950			286.125
	Huang Xu		14.750	16.000		16.475		286.125
	Li Xiaopeng				16.775	16.450	15.725	286.125
	Xiao Qin		16.100				15.250	286.125
	Yang Wei	15.425	15.175	16.300	16.600	16.100		286.125
	Zou Kai	15.925					15.975	286.125
	Japan	45.975 (5)	45.575 (2)	46.900 (2)	46.750 (8)	47.075 (4)	46.600 (3)	278.875
	Takehiro Kashima		15.575		15.200			278.875
	Takuya Nakase	15.000		15.425			15.525	278.875
	Makoto Okiguchi	15.275						278.875
	Koki Sakamoto		14.850	15.525	15.400	15.000		278.875
	Hiroyuki Tomita		15.150	15.950		16.150	15.625	278.875
	Kōhei Uchimura	15.700			16.150	15.925	15.450	278.875
	United States	45.400 (7)	41.875 (8)	46.375 (3)	48.225 (4)	47.050 (5)	46.925 (2)	275.850
	Alexander Artemev		15.350					275.850
	Raj Bhavsar		13.750	15.325	16.125	15.575		275.850
	Joe Hagerty	14.625					15.550	275.850
	Jonathan Horton	15.575		15.625	16.200	15.625	15.700	275.850
	Justin Spring	15.200			15.900	15.850	15.675	275.850
	Kai Wen Tan		12.775	15.425				275.850
4	Germany	46.225 (3)	44.650 (3)	45.650 (6)	47.000 (7)	45.425 (7)	45.650 (4)	274.600
4	Thomas Andergassen		15.075	15.550				274.600
4	Philipp Boy		14.675		14.950		15.725	274.600
4	Fabian Hambüchen	15.875		15.175	16.175	15.950	15.100	274.600
4	Robert Juckel		14.900	14.925			14.825	274.600
4	Marcel Nguyen	15.475			15.875	14.400		274.600
4	Eugen Spiridonov	14.875				15.075		274.600
5	South Korea	46.350 (1)	43.050 (5)	45.500 (7)	47.225 (6)	47.225 (3)	45.025 (6)	274.375
5	Kim Dae-Eun	15.625		15.275	15.950	15.925	14.400	274.375
5	Kim Ji-Hoon		14.850				15.450	274.375
5	Kim Seung-Il							274.375
5	Kim Soo-Myun	15.825	14.675		15.925		15.175	274.375
5	Yang Tae-Young	14.900	13.525	14.750	15.350	15.450		274.375
5	Yoo Won-Chul			15.475		15.850		274.375
6	Russia	46.050 (4)	42.875 (7)	45.950 (5)	48.150 (5)	47.300 (2)	43.975 (7)	274.300
6	Maxim Devyatovsky	15.175	13.575	15.450	15.525		14.325	274.300
6	Anton Golotsutskov	15.650			16.575			274.300
6	Sergei Khorokhordin	15.225	13.825			15.675	14.575	274.300
6	Nikolai Kryukov		15.475		16.050	16.150		274.300
6	Konstantin Pluzhnikov			15.250				274.300
6	Yuri Ryazanov			15.250		15.475	15.075	274.300
7	Romania	46.250 (2)	43.525 (4)	46.375 (3)	49.300 (2)	45.225 (8)	43.500 (8)	274.175
7	Adrian Bucur			15.125				274.175
7	Marian Drăgulescu	15.650			16.550		14.425	274.175
7	Flavius Koczi	15.075	15.175		16.525	15.050	14.325	274.175
7	Ilie Daniel Popescu		13.700		16.225			274.175
7	Răzvan Selariu	15.525	14.650	15.325		14.850	14.750	274.175
7	George Robert Stănescu			15.925		15.325		274.175
8	France	44.625 (8)	42.925 (6)	45.300 (8)	48.400 (3)	46.575 (6)	45.050 (5)	272.875
8	Thomas Bouhail	15.300	14.375		16.475			272.875
8	Benoît Caranobe	14.425		15.225	15.950			272.875
8	Yann Cucherat					16.050	14.250	272.875
8	Dimitri Karbanenko	14.900			15.975	15.375	15.350	272.875
8	Danny Rodrigues		13.750	16.100				272.875
8	Hamilton Sabot		14.800	13.975		15.150	15.450	272.875
