= Gymnastics at the 2008 Summer Olympics – Men's pommel horse =

Men's pommel horse at the Games of the XXIX Olympiad
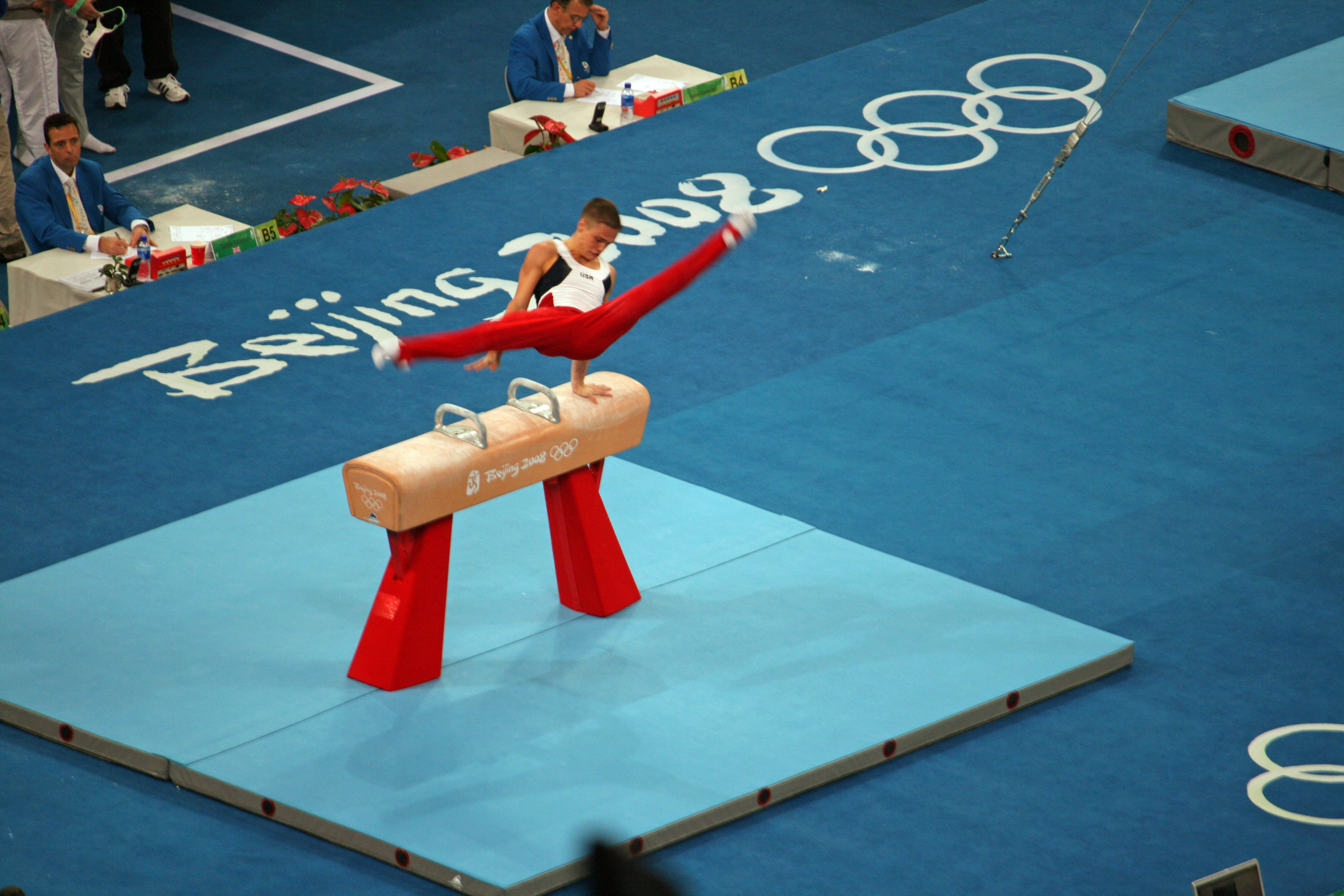
- Alexander Artemev on the pommel horse
- Venue: Beijing National Indoor Stadium
- Dates: 9 August (qualifying); 17 August (final)
- Competitors: 76 from 27 nations
- Winning score: 15.875

Medalists
1st place, gold medalist(s)		Xiao Qin; China
2nd place, silver medalist(s)		Filip Ude; Croatia
3rd place, bronze medalist(s)		Louis Smith; Great Britain

The men's pommel horse competition at the 2008 Summer Olympics was held on August 17 at the Beijing National Indoor Stadium. The eight competitors (with a maximum of two per nation) with the highest scores in qualifying proceeded to the men's pommel horse finals. There, each gymnast performed again; the scores from the final round (ignoring qualification) determined the final ranking. There were 76 competitors from 27 nations that competed on the pommel horse, with nations in the team event entering up to 5 gymnasts while other nations could enter up to 2. The event was won by Xiao Qin of China, the nation's second consecutive and third overall victory in the pommel horse. The other two medals went to nations that had never earned a medal in the event before: Filip Ude of Croatia took silver while Louis Smith of Great Britain finished with bronze.

== Background ==
This was the 22nd appearance of the event, which is one of the five apparatus events held every time there were apparatus events at the Summer Olympics (no apparatus events were held in 1900, 1908, 1912, or 1920). Three of the eight finalists from 2004 returned: bronze medalist Takehiro Kashima of Japan, fourth-place finisher Huang Xu of China, and eighth-place finisher Hiroyuki Tomita of Japan. Xiao Qin of China had won the last three world championships (2005, 2006, and 2007), earned the nickname "Pommel King," and was heavily favored in Beijing.

Uzbekistan, Venezuela, and Yemen each made their debut in the men's pommel horse. The United States made its 20th appearance, most of any nation; the Americans had missed only the inaugural 1896 pommel horse and the boycotted 1980 Games.

== Qualification ==
Qualification for the men's artistic gymnastics in 2008 was based entirely on the 2007 World Artistic Gymnastics Championships. The top 12 teams at the world championships could send a full team of 6 gymnasts to the Olympics. The next 3 teams (#13 through #15) could send 2 gymnasts. The 3 teams after that (#16 through #18) could send 1 gymnast. The next 7 individual gymnasts (only from nations without any qualified gymnasts yet) and apparatus gold medal winners also qualified. The FIG Executive Board made invitational selections to ensure host country and continental representation and the Tripartite Commission made an invitation. The quota of 98 gymnasts was then filled through additional individual gymnasts.

== Competition format ==
The 1996 gymnastics competition had introduced the "7–6–5" format, in which each team had 7 members, designated 6 for each apparatus, and had 5 count for team scores. In 2000, this was reduced across the board to a "6–5–4" format; the 2008 competition kept this format. Further, while in 1996 all 7 team members could compete on each apparatus for individual purposes, since 2000 only the 5 designated for that apparatus competed. The 2000 competition had also eliminated the compulsory exercises; only voluntary exercises were done on each apparatus. The qualifying round scores were used for qualification for the team all-around, individual all-around, and apparatus finals.

The top eight gymnasts, with a limit of two per nation, advanced to the final. Non-finalists were ranked 9th through 76th based on preliminary score. The preliminary score had no effect on the final; once the eight finalists were selected, their ranking depended only on the final exercise.

Scoring in artistic gymnastics under the Code of Points is based on two separate scores that are then combined in order to come to the final score. The A score measures the difficulty of each element (and combinations of elements) within the routine, while the B score evaluates the performance, ie, the "execution, composition and artistry" of the routine.

== Schedule ==
All times are China Standard Time (UTC+8)

Date	Time	Round
Saturday, 9 August 2008	12:00	Qualifying
Sunday, 17 August 2008	19:33	Final

== Results ==
=== Qualifying ===
The top 8 gymnasts, with a limit of 2 per nation, qualified for the final.

=== Final ===
Rank	Gymnast	Nation	D Score	E Score	Pen.	Total
1st place, gold medalist(s)	Xiao Qin	China	6.400	9.475		15.875
2nd place, silver medalist(s)	Filip Ude	Croatia	6.400	9.325		15.725
3rd place, bronze medalist(s)	Louis Smith	Great Britain	6.700	9.025		15.725
4	Yang Wei	China	6.200	9.250		15.450
5	Hiroyuki Tomita	Japan	6.100	9.275		15.375
6	Kim Ji-Hoon	South Korea	6.100	9.075		15.175
7	Alexander Artemev	United States	6.300	8.675		14.975
8	José Luis Fuentes	Venezuela	6.300	8.350		14.650
