= Gymnastics at the 2004 Summer Olympics – Men's artistic individual all-around =

Men's artistic individual all-around at the Games of the XXVIII Olympiad
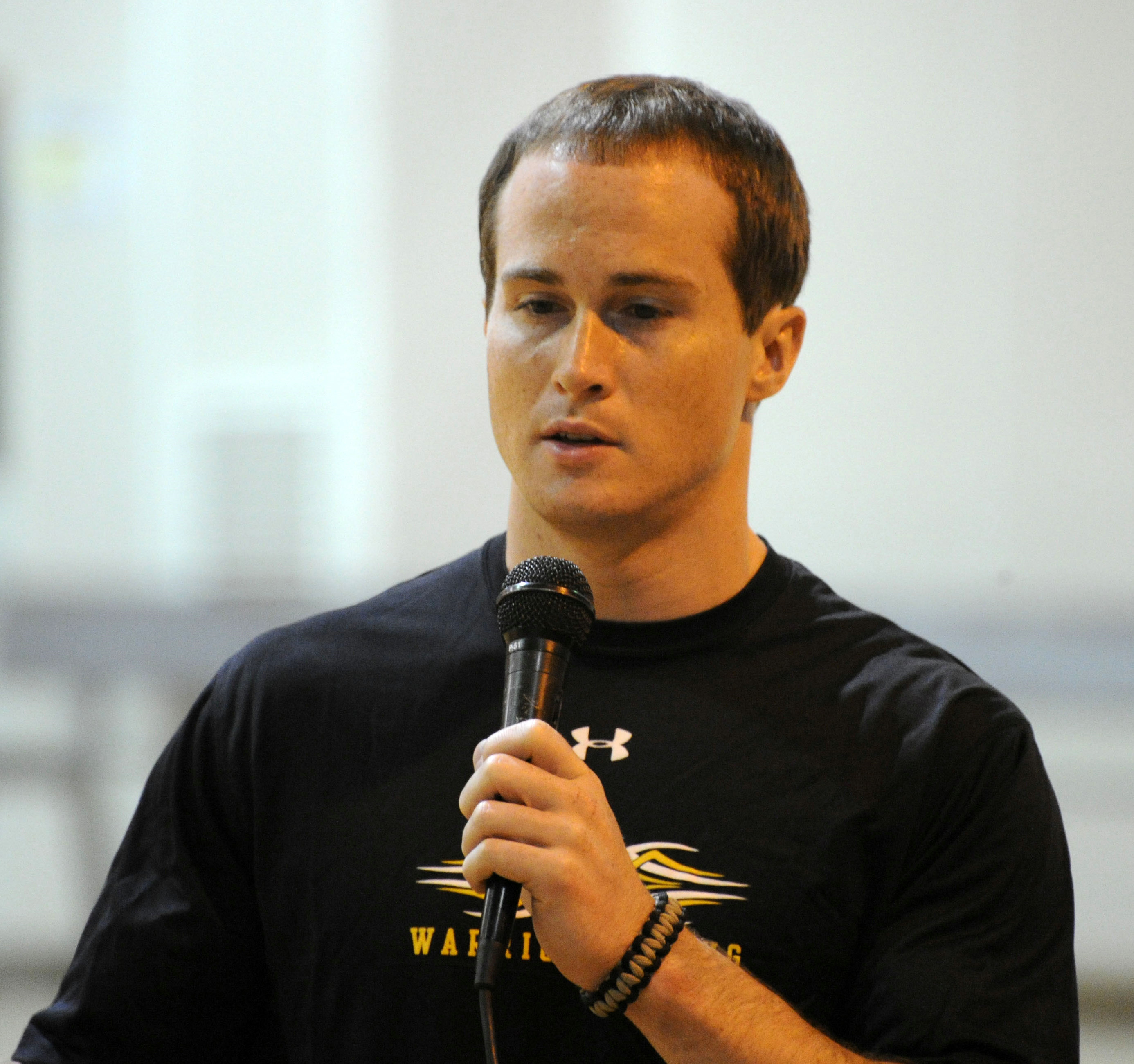
- Gold medalist Paul Hamm (2010)
- Venue: O.A.C.A. Olympic Indoor Hall
- Dates: 14–18 August 2004
- Competitors: 98 from 31 nations
- Winning score: 57.823

Medalists
1st place, gold medalist(s)		Paul Hamm; United States
2nd place, silver medalist(s)		Kim Dae-Eun; South Korea
3rd place, bronze medalist(s)		Yang Tae Young; South Korea

The men's individual all-around competition was one of eight events for male competitors in the artistic gymnastics discipline contested in the gymnastics at the 2004 Summer Olympics in Athens. The qualification and final rounds took place on August 14 and August 18 at the Olympic Indoor Hall. There were 98 competitors from 31 nations. Each nation could enter a team of 6 gymnasts or up to 2 individual gymnasts. The event was won by Paul Hamm of the United States, the nation's first victory in the men's all-around since the 1904 Games in St. Louis and second overall. It was the first medal of any color for an American in the men's all-around since the 1984 Games in Los Angeles. South Korea took two medals (the maximum possible under the new rule limiting finalists to two per nation), a silver for Kim Dae-Eun and a bronze for Yang Tae Young. The scoring of the final was disputed; Olympedia calls this "the most controversial men's gymnastic event ever."

== Scoring controversy ==
The Korean team contested Yang Tae-Young's parallel bars score after judges misidentified one of the elements of his routine. The effect of this misidentification was that the start value was recorded as 9.9 rather than 10. Had the start value been assigned correctly—with no other changes to any scoring—Yang's score would have resulted in his winning the gold medal. However, as noted by the Court of Arbitration for Sport, as with many other sports controversies, (i) scoring the routine correctly initially may have affected the remainder of the competition and (ii) there were potentially other scoring errors that may have affected the results as well; thus, assigning who "would have won the event" but for the error is "something in the realm of speculation, not of certainty."

The judges on the "A" panel were responsible for determining the start value of the routine. This value is determined during (not before) the routine, as a gymnast may change their routine at any time (and may fail to perform elements intended to be part of the routine). The three judges on the panel were Oscar Buitrago of Colombia, Benjamin Bango of Spain, and head judge George Beckstead of the United States. The panel assigned Yang a start value of 9.9 after misidentifying a "Belle" element as a "Morisue" element.

Kim Dong Min of South Korea, one of the judges on the "B" panel (responsible for determining execution scores), spoke to Buitrago about Yang's start value immediately following the parallel bar rotation. Buitrago explained how the value had been reached and thought Kim was satisfied. Kim later said that he was not satisfied; however, at the time, did not ask Buitrago to pursue the matter further.

After Kim informed the Korean head coach Lee Joo-hyung of the issue, Lee raised the issue with the "A" panel and Adrian Stoica of Romania, the President of the Men's Technical Committee. Stoica presided over the Superior Jury, empowered to correct judging errors and control judges' scores. The precise timing of this discussion (during or after the medal ceremony) is disputed but was certainly after the competition had ended.

The next morning, the Korean delegation sent written requests via fax to Stoica and to the President of FIG (Bruno Grandi) for a correction in the start value. That afternoon, Grandi responded that the rules did not allow a protest against the judges' marks, but that FIG was analyzing the marks and would take action against any judge who had made a serious mistake. The next day, the Technical Committee analyzed the routine and determined that the correct start value was 10. The FIG Executive Council temporarily suspended Bango, Buitrago, and Beckstead.

On 22 August, the National Olympic Committees for the United States and Korea met with the IOC and proposed that gold medals be awarded to both Hamm and Yang. The IOC responded that it would not issue two gold medals, but would defer to FIG regarding re-allocation of medals if the scoring error was corrected.

On 26 August, Grandi sent a letter, via the United States Olympic Committee, addressed to Hamm and requesting that he return the medal, including commenting that Yang was "the true winner" of the event. Hamm had allegedly made comments in the press stating that he would return the medal if requested to do so by FIG. The USOC, however, objected to the letter and refused to forward it to Hamm, responding that under FIG rules (including finality of judges' scores) that Hamm was "the Olympic gold medalist" in the event; the USOC demanded that FIG retract the "unacceptable request."

Yang formally appealed to the Court of Arbitration for Sport (CAS) on 28 August. The CAS held a hearing on 27 September, receiving oral evidence and considering written submissions. On 21 October, the CAS dismissed the Korean Olympic Committee's appeal on the grounds that the appeal, coming after the end of competition, was made too late, and insufficient evidence of corruption or bad faith on the part of the judges was presented to overturn a strong preference for a "field of play" judgment rather than one made after the fact.

== Background ==
This was the 24th appearance of the men's individual all-around. The first individual all-around competition had been held in 1900, after the 1896 competitions featured only individual apparatus events. A men's individual all-around has been held every Games since 1900.

Six of the top 10 gymnasts from the 2000 Games returned: gold medalist Alexei Nemov of Russia, silver medalist Yang Wei of China, fourth-place finisher Ivan Ivankov of Belarus, sixth-place finisher Blaine Wilson of the United States, seventh-place finisher Alexei Bondarenko of Russia, and eighth-place finisher Yordan Yovchev of Bulgaria. The reigning (2003) World Champion was Paul Hamm of the United States; Yang had finished second and Hiroyuki Tomita of Japan was third.

Colombia, Malaysia, and Tunisia each made their debut in the event. France made its 22nd appearance, most among nations.

== Competition format ==
The competition generally followed the 2000 format, though with a significant change: the number of finalists was reduced from 36 to 24, with the maximum per nation cut from 3 to 2. The competition continued to use a preliminary (qualifying) round and a final round, with scores cleared between rounds (no carryover). The preliminary round used one optional exercise for each apparatus rather than requiring both a compulsory and optional exercise (as was done pre-2000). The team event scoring used a 6–5–4 format (each team had 6 gymnasts, selected 5 per apparatus, with 4 scores counting), a reduced version of the 1996 7–6–5 system, which reduced the number of gymnasts competing in every apparatus. Total scores and an overall rank were still used for all gymnasts, however. 2000 had also been the year where the tie-breaking rules came into effect, which resulted in far less tie rankings or duplicate of medals than at the Games before that. Each exercise was scored from 0 to 10; thus the total preliminary score was from 0 to 60. The final total, with six exercises, was from 0 to 60.

== Schedule ==
All times are Greece Standard Time (UTC+2)

Date	Time	Round
Saturday, 14 August 2004	12:30	Qualifying
Wednesday, 18 August 2004	20:30	Final

== Results ==
Ninety-eight gymnasts competed in the individual all-around event in the artistic gymnastics qualification round on August 14, by performing on at least one apparatus. Forty-seven competed on all six apparati. The twenty-four highest scoring gymnasts advanced to the final on August 18.

Rank	Gymnast	Nation	Prelim	Floor (gymnastics)	Pommel horse	Rings (gymnastics)	Vault (gymnastics)	Parallel bars	Horizontal bar	Total
1st place, gold medalist(s)	Paul Hamm	United States	58.061	9.725	9.700	9.587	9.137	9.837	9.837	57.823
2nd place, silver medalist(s)	Kim Dae-Eun	South Korea	56.811	9.650	9.537	9.712	9.412	9.775	9.725	57.811
3rd place, bronze medalist(s)	Yang Tae Young	South Korea	57.924	9.512	9.650	9.725	9.700	9.712	9.475	57.774
4	Ioan Silviu Suciu	Romania	57.398	9.650	9.737	9.550	9.737	9.312	9.662	57.648
5	Rafael Martínez	Spain	56.636	9.500	9.687	9.575	9.612	9.700	9.475	57.549
6	Hiroyuki Tomita	Japan	57.649	9.062	9.737	9.762	9.625	9.637	9.662	57.485
7	Yang Wei	China	57.374	9.600	9.725	9.737	9.512	9.800	8.987	57.361
8	Marian Drăgulescu	Romania	57.436	9.612	9.525	9.562	9.850	9.437	9.337	57.323
9	Brett McClure	United States	56.323	9.412	9.712	9.162	9.625	9.725	9.612	57.248
10	Roman Zozulya	Ukraine	57.273	9.525	9.412	9.575	9.500	9.762	9.225	56.999
11	Isao Yoneda	Japan	56.924	9.650	9.575	9.337	9.700	9.612	9.025	56.899
12	Georgy Grebenkov	Russia	56.148	9.587	9.125	9.662	9.437	9.650	9.362	56.823
13	Alexei Bondarenko	Russia	56.936	9.600	9.150	9.600	9.400	9.450	9.600	56.800
14	Yernar Yerimbetov	Kazakhstan	57.424	9.312	8.962	9.537	9.625	9.225	9.737	56.398
15	Luis Vargas	Puerto Rico	56.587	8.337	9.612	9.500	9.462	9.562	9.662	56.135
16	Ruslan Mezentsev	Ukraine	56.711	9.512	8.975	9.387	9.437	9.637	9.112	56.060
17	Benoît Caranobe	France	56.635	9.112	9.400	9.575	9.187	9.087	9.612	55.973
18	Igors Vihrovs	Latvia	56.423	9.687	8.862	9.187	9.700	9.000	9.437	55.873
19	Pavel Gofman	Israel	56.723	9.100	9.262	9.425	9.112	9.725	9.062	55.686
20	Eric Lopez Rios	Cuba	56.398	9.137	8.600	9.500	9.700	9.675	8.837	55.449
21	Sergei Pfeifer	Germany	55.987	9.312	9.025	9.587	9.087	9.162	9.212	55.385
22	Ilia Giorgadze	Georgia	56.012	8.737	9.587	9.487	9.337	9.662	8.462	55.272
23	Fabian Hambüchen	Germany	56.061	9.475	8.287	8.512	9.412	9.387	9.750	54.823
24	Andreas Schweizer	Switzerland	55.436	8.450	9.062	9.675	9.225	9.450	8.750	54.612

== See also ==
- Gymnastics at the 2004 Summer Olympics – Women's artistic individual all-around
