= Gymnastics at the 2008 Summer Olympics – Men's rings =

Olympic gymnastics event

Men's rings at the Games of the XXIX Olympiad
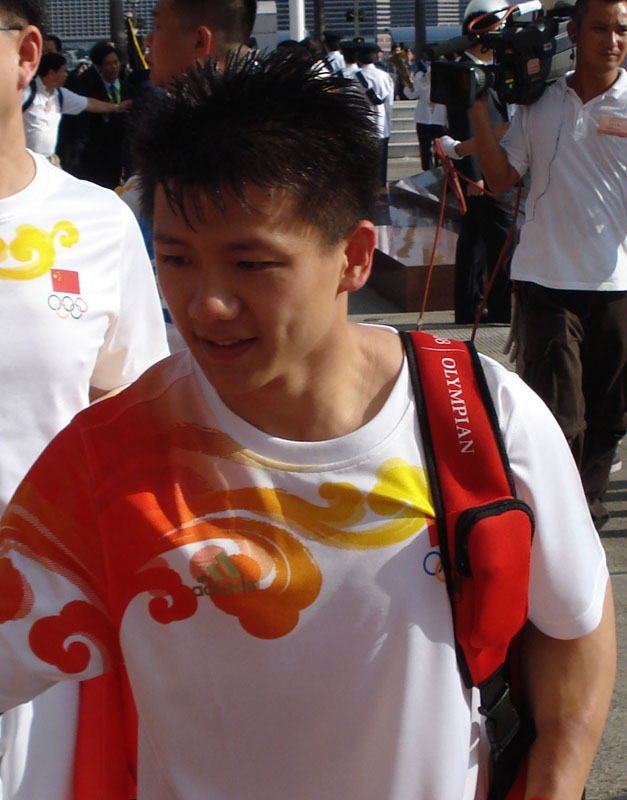
- Chen Yibing
- Venue: Beijing National Indoor Stadium
- Dates: 9 August (qualifying); 18 August (final)
- Competitors: 70 from 25 nations

Medalists
| 1st place, gold medalist(s) | | Chen Yibing | China |
| 2nd place, silver medalist(s) | | Yang Wei | China |
| 3rd place, bronze medalist(s) | | Oleksandr Vorobiov | Ukraine |

The men's rings competition at the 2008 Summer Olympics was held on August 18 at the Beijing National Indoor Stadium. The eight competitors (with a maximum of two per nation) with the highest scores in qualifying proceeded to the men's rings finals. There, each gymnast performed again; the scores from the final round (ignoring qualification) determined final ranking. There were 70 competitors from 25 nations that competed on the rings, with nations in the team event entering up to 5 gymnasts while other nations could enter up to 2. The event was won by Chen Yibing of China, the nation's first victory in the rings since 1984. Yang Wei, also of China, took silver. Bronze went to Oleksandr Vorobiov, the nation's first medal in the event.

== Background ==
This was the 22nd appearance of the event, which is one of the five apparatus events held every time there were apparatus events at the Summer Olympics (no apparatus events were held in 1900, 1908, 1912, or 1920). Three of the eight finalists from 2004 returned: silver medalist (and 2000 bronze medalist and 1996 finalist) Yordan Yovchev of Bulgaria, fourth-place finisher Hiroyuki Tomita of Japan, and fifth-place finisher Matteo Morandi of Italy. Chen Yibing of China was the two-time (2006 and 2007) reigning world champion; Yovchev had reached the worlds podium both years as well.

One of the two (along with Chen) strongest rings gymnasts in 2008, Yuri van Gelder of the Netherlands, did not qualify: the Dutch team had earned one spot, which went to high bar specialist Epke Zonderland; van Gelder's all-around score did not qualify him for an additional place, and apparatus specialist places went only to the 2007 world champions—van Gelder had won in 2005, but finished second to Chen in 2007. In 2012, the qualification rules would be changed to include all world championship apparatus medalists.

Uzbekistan and Venezuela each made their debut in the men's rings. The United States made its 20th appearance, most of any nation; the Americans had missed only the inaugural 1896 rings and the boycotted 1980 Games.

== Qualification ==
Qualification for the men's artistic gymnastics in 2008 was based entirely on the 2007 World Artistic Gymnastics Championships. The top 12 teams at the world championships could send a full team of 6 gymnasts to the Olympics. The next 3 teams (#13 through #15) could send 2 gymnasts. The 3 teams after that (#16 through #18) could send 1 gymnast. The next 7 individual gymnasts (only from nations without any qualified gymnasts yet) and apparatus gold medal winners also qualified. The FIG Executive Board made invitational selections to ensure host country and continental representation and the Tripartite Commission made an invitation. The quota of 98 gymnasts was then filled through additional individual gymnasts.

== Competition format ==
The 1996 gymnastics competition had introduced the "7–6–5" format, in which each team had 7 members, designated 6 for each apparatus, and had 5 count for team scores. In 2000, this was reduced across the board to a "6–5–4" format; the 2008 competition kept this format. Further, while in 1996 all 7 team members could compete on each apparatus for individual purposes, since 2000 only the 5 designated for that apparatus competed. The 2000 competition had also eliminated the compulsory exercises; only voluntary exercises were done on each apparatus. The qualifying round scores were used for qualification for the team all-around, individual all-around, and apparatus finals.

The top eight gymnasts, with a limit of two per nation, advanced to the final. Non-finalists were ranked 9th through 76th based on preliminary score. The preliminary score had no effect on the final; once the eight finalists were selected, their ranking depended only on the final exercise.

Scoring in artistic gymnastics under the Code of Points is based on two separate scores that are then combined in order to come to the final score. The D score measures the difficulty of each element (and combinations of elements) within the routine, while the E score evaluates the performance, ie, the "execution, composition and artistry" of the routine.

== Schedule ==
All times are China Standard Time (UTC+8)

| Date | Time | Round |
|---|---|---|
| Saturday, 9 August 2008 | 12:00 | Qualifying |
| Sunday, 18 August 2008 | 18:00 | Final |

== Results ==
=== Qualifying ===
The top 8 gymnasts, with a limit of 2 per nation, qualified for the final.

=== Final ===
| Rank | Gymnast | Nation | D Score | E Score | Pen. | Total |
|---|---|---|---|---|---|---|
| 1st place, gold medalist(s) | Chen Yibing | China | 7.300 | 9.300 | | 16.600 |
| 2nd place, silver medalist(s) | Yang Wei | China | 7.500 | 8.925 | | 16.425 |
| 3rd place, bronze medalist(s) | Oleksandr Vorobiov | Ukraine | 7.200 | 9.125 | | 16.325 |
| 4 | Andrea Coppolino | Italy | 7.100 | 9.125 | | 16.225 |
| 5 | Danny Pinheiro Rodrigues | France | 7.500 | 8.725 | | 16.225 |
| 6 | Matteo Morandi | Italy | 7.100 | 9.100 | | 16.200 |
| 7 | Robert Stanescu | Romania | 7.000 | 8.825 | | 15.825 |
| 8 | Yordan Yovchev | Bulgaria | 6.800 | 8.725 | | 15.525 |
