= Koki Sakamoto =

Japanese artistic gymnast

- Born: August 21, 1986 (age 40) Sapporo

Gymnastics career
- Discipline: Men's artistic gymnastics
- Country represented: Japan
Medal record
Olympics
Silver medal – second place	2008 Beijing	Team competition

Koki Sakamoto (坂本 功貴, Sakamoto Kōki) (born 21 August 1986, in Sapporo) is a Japanese gymnast. He was a member of the 2008 Olympic team that won the silver medal. He was the 2nd best Japanese gymnast in the qualifying round and 5th overall but was replaced in the all around final by Hiroyuki Tomita.
