= Xiao Qin =

Chinese gymnast (born 1985)

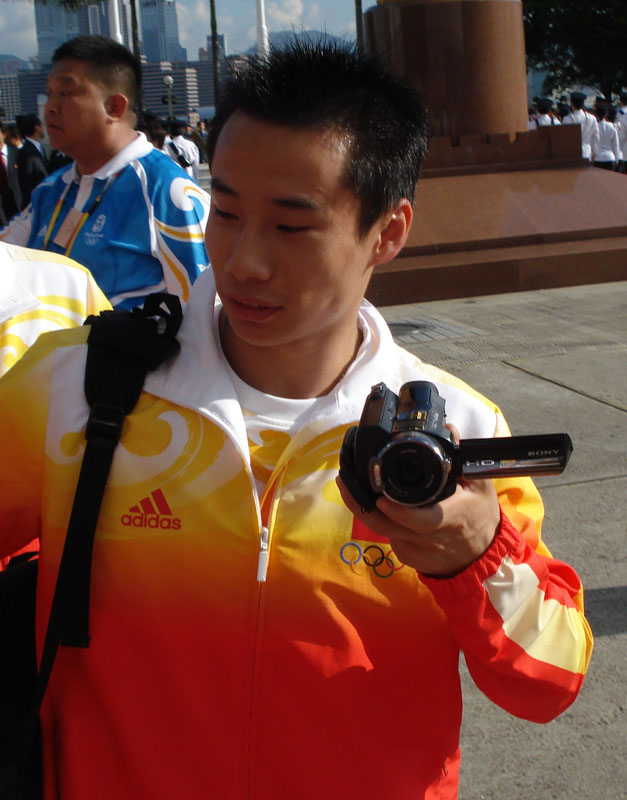

Personal information
- Full name: Xiao Qin
- Born: January 12, 1985 (age 41) Nanjing, Jiangsu, China
- Height: 1.64 m (5 ft 5 in)

Gymnastics career
- Discipline: Men's artistic gymnastics
- Country represented: China
- Head coach: Huang Yubin
- Assistant coach: Jin Weiguo
Medal record
Olympic Games
Gold medal – first place	2008 Beijing	Team
Gold medal – first place	2008 Beijing	Pommel horse
World Championships
Gold medal – first place	2003 Anaheim	Team
Gold medal – first place	2005 Melbourne	Pommel horse
Gold medal – first place	2006 Aarhus	Team
Gold medal – first place	2006 Aarhus	Pommel horse
Gold medal – first place	2007 Stuttgart	Team
Gold medal – first place	2007 Stuttgart	Pommel horse
Silver medal – second place	2001 Ghent	Pommel horse
Silver medal – second place	2002 Debrecen	Pommel horse
Asian Games
Gold medal – first place	2006 Doha	Team
National Games
Gold medal – first place	2005 Nanjing	Pommel Horse
Gold medal – first place	2009 Jinan	Pommel horse
Gold medal – first place	2013 Liaoning	Pommel horse
Bronze medal – third place	2001 Guangzhou	Team
Bronze medal – third place	2001 Guangzhou	Pommel horse
Bronze medal – third place	2005 Nanjing	Team

Xiao Qin (simplified Chinese: 肖钦; traditional Chinese: 肖欽; pinyin: Xiào Qīn; born January 12, 1985) is a Chinese gymnast. He won Olympic, world, national, East Asian Games, and World Cup titles in the pommel horse. He joined the China national team in 1999 and is part of the People's Liberation Army.

== Gymnastics career ==
He has qualified for two Olympics. At the 2004 Olympics in Athens, Xiao Qin was one of the favorites for the Olympic title on pommel horse, but he fell during the qualification round. He qualified for the horizontal bar event final, but placed 6th. At the 2008 Olympics in Beijing, he won gold in the pommel horse along with gold for his team.

== Competitive history ==
Year	Competition description	Location	Apparatus	Rank-final	Score-final	Rank-qualifying	Score-qualifying
2001	World Championships	Ghent	Team	5	165.260	7	218.296
2001	World Championships	Ghent	Pommel horse	2	9.775		
2002	World Championships	Debrecen	Pommel horse	2	9.750	2	9.737
2003	World Cup/Series	Thessaloniki	Pommel horse	4	9.025	4	9.100
2003	World Championships	Anaheim	Team	1	171.996	3	225.119
2003	World Championships	Anaheim	Pommel horse	7	9.350		
2004	World Cup/Series	Ghent	Pommel horse	1	9.925		
2004	World Cup/Series	Ghent	Parallel bars	7	9.325		
2004	World Cup/Series	Ghent	Horizontal bar	3	9.612		
2004	World Cup/Series	Glasgow	Pommel horse	1	9.900		
2004	World Cup/Series Final	Birmingham	Pommel horse	1	9.825		
2004	World Cup/Series Final	Birmingham	Horizontal bar	8	8.200		
2004	Olympic Games	Athens	Team	5	171.257	4	229.507
2004	Olympic Games	Athens	Pommel horse			44	9.337
2004	Olympic Games	Athens	Horizontal bar	6	9.737	4	9.750
2005	World Championships	Melbourne	All around			56	28.974
2005	World Championships	Melbourne	Pommel horse	1	9.850	1	9.800
2005	World Championships	Melbourne	Horizontal bar	6	9.362	2	9.687
2005	World Championships	Melbourne	Parallel bars			19	9.487
2006	World Cup/Series Final	São Paulo	Pommel horse	1	16.100		
2006	World Cup/Series	Shanghai	Pommel horse	1	16.300		
2006	World Cup/Series	Ghent	Pommel horse	1	15.975		
2006	World Championships	Aarhus	Team	1	277.775	1	372.250
2006	World Championships	Aarhus	All around			193	61.875
2006	World Championships	Aarhus	Pommel horse	1	16.025	1	16.175
2006	World Championships	Aarhus	Horizontal bar			86	14.250
2006	World Championships	Aarhus	Parallel bars			11	15.675
2007	World Cup/Series	Shanghai	Pommel horse	1	15.325		
2007	World Cup/Series	Shanghai	Horizontal bar	3	15.475		
2007	World Championships	Stuttgart	Team	1	281.900	1	374.275
2007	World Championships	Stuttgart	All around			131	77.225
2007	World Championships	Stuttgart	Pommel horse	1	16.300	1	16.275
2007	World Championships	Stuttgart	Horizontal bar			12	15.100
2007	World Championships	Stuttgart	Parallel bars			14	15.875
2007	World Championships	Stuttgart	Floor Exercise			98	14.300
2008	World Cup/Series	Tianjin	Pommel horse	1	16.375		
2008	Olympic Games	Beijing	Team	1	286.125	1	374.675
2008	Olympic Games	Beijing	All around			46	76.700
2008	Olympic Games	Beijing	Pommel horse	1	15.875	1	16.175
2008	Olympic Games	Beijing	Horizontal bar			56	14.375
2008	Olympic Games	Beijing	Parallel bars			18	15.150
2008	Olympic Games	Beijing	Floor Exercise			56	14.375
