= Kenya Kobayashi =

Japanese gymnast

- Born: 21 August 1983 (age 43)

Gymnastics career
- Discipline: Men's artistic gymnastics
- Country represented: Japan
Medal record
Representing Japan
World Championships
Silver medal – second place	2010 Rotterdam	Team
Silver medal – second place	2011 Tokyo	Team
Asian Games
Silver medal – second place	2006 Doha	Team

Kenya Kobayashi (小林 研也, Kobayashi Ken'ya; born 21 August 1983) is a Japanese gymnast. He was part of the Japanese team that won the silver medal in the team event at the 2006 Asian Games. He won a team silver medal as part of Japan's delegation at the 2010 World Artistic Gymnastics Championships and 2011 World Artistic Gymnastics Championships.
