= Yoo Won-chul =

South Korean gymnast (born 1984)

- 유원철
- Alternative name: Yu Won-cheol
- Born: 20 July 1984 (age 42) Masan, South Korea
- Height: 1.65 m (5 ft 5 in)

Gymnastics career
- Discipline: Men's artistic gymnastics
- Country represented: South Korea
- Club: Pohang Iron and Steel Company
Medal record
Men's artistic gymnastics
Representing South Korea
Olympic Games
Silver medal – second place	2008 Beijing	Parallel bars
World Championships
Silver medal – second place	2006 Aarhus	Parallel bars
Asian Games
Bronze medal – third place	2006 Doha	Team
Bronze medal – third place	2010 Guangzhou	Team

Korean name
- Hangul: 유원철
- Hanja: 劉源哲
- RR: Yu Woncheol
- MR: Yu Wŏnch'ŏl

Yoo Won-chul (Korean pronunciation: [ju.wʌn.tɕʰʌl]; born 20 July 1984) is a South Korean gymnast. Yoo was part of the South Korean team that won the bronze medal in the team event at the 2006 Asian Games. As an individual, he won a silver medal at the 2006 World Artistic Gymnastics Championships in the parallel bars and a silver medal in the parallel bars at the 2008 Summer Olympic games.

== Education ==
- Korea National Sport University
