= Huang Xu =

Chinese artistic gymnast

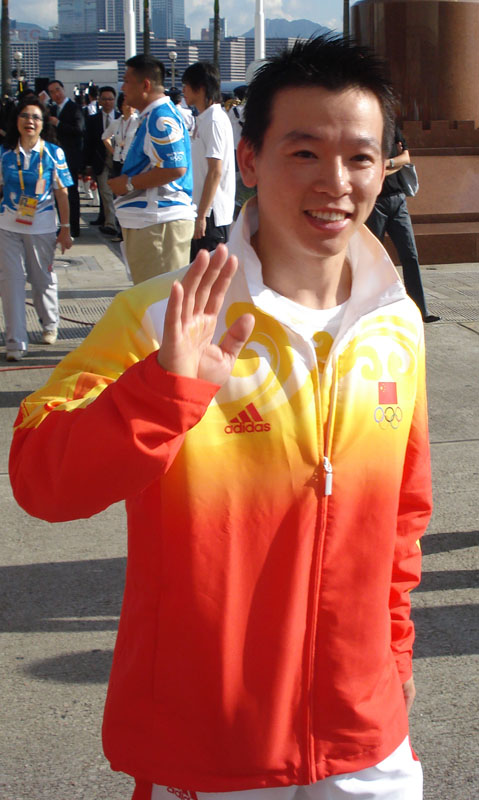

Personal information
- Born: 4 February 1979 (age 47) Nantong, Jiangsu, China
- Height: 162.3 cm (5 ft 4 in)

Gymnastics career
- Discipline: Men's artistic gymnastics
- Country represented: China
- Head coach: Chen Xiong
- Assistant coach: Huang Yubin
Medal record
Representing China
Olympic Games
Gold medal – first place	2000 Sydney	Team
Gold medal – first place	2008 Beijing	Team
World Championships
Gold medal – first place	1997 Lausanne	Team
Gold medal – first place	1999 Tianjin	Team
Gold medal – first place	2003 Anaheim	Team
Gold medal – first place	2007 Stuttgart	Team
Silver medal – second place	2003 Anaheim	Parallel bars
Asian Games
Gold medal – first place	1998 Bangkok	Team
Gold medal – first place	1998 Bangkok	All-around
Gold medal – first place	2002 Busan	Team
Gold medal – first place	2002 Busan	Rings
Gold medal – first place	2002 Busan	Parallel bars
Silver medal – second place	1998 Bangkok	Rings
Bronze medal – third place	1998 Bangkok	Pommel horse
National Games
Gold medal – first place	2005 Nanjing	Rings
Silver medal – second place	2005 Nanjing	Team

Huang Xu (simplified Chinese: 黄旭; traditional Chinese: 黃旭; pinyin: Huáng Xù; born February 4, 1979) is a Chinese artistic gymnast. He specializes in the pommel horse and the parallel bars, and is also strong in still rings.

== Earlyt life ==
Huang began gymnastics training when he was five and was a member of the Jiangsu provincial team in 1989. At the age of 14, he was selected into the national team.

== Gymnastics career ==
Huang represented China at the 2000 Summer Olympics and was a member of the gold-medal-winning Chinese team. Individually, he placed 7th in the parallel bars event final, with a score of 9.650.

During the 2004 Summer Olympics, Huang contributed heavily to the Chinese gymnastics team, a 9.675 in pommel horse, a 9.712 in still rings and a 9.687 in horizontal bar. However, several errors and falls of his teammates prevented the Chinese team from getting a team medal. Individually, he placed fourth in the pommel horse event final, with a score of 9.775.

Huang was the oldest member of the Chinese gymnastics team at the 2008 Summer Olympics and won gold in the team final. He also placed sixth in the parallel bars event final.

Huang is the 2003 World silver medalist in the parallel bars, and has been a member of four World Champion Chinese teams (1997, 1999, 2003, and 2007).
