= Teng Haibin =

Chinese artistic gymnast

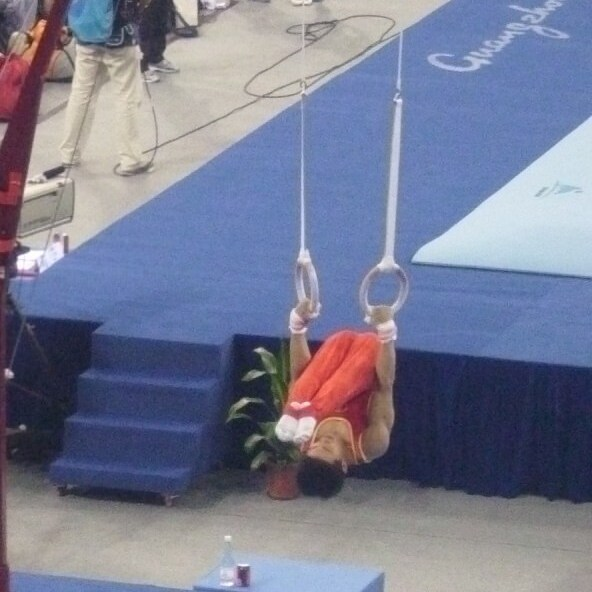
- Teng at the 2010 Asian Games

Personal information
- Born: 2 January 1985 (age 41) Beijing, China
- Spouse: Zhang Nan

Gymnastics career
- Discipline: Men's artistic gymnastics
- Country represented: China
Medal record
Olympic Games
Gold medal – first place	2004 Athens	Pommel horse
World Championships
Gold medal – first place	2003 Anaheim	Team
Gold medal – first place	2003 Anaheim	Pommel horse
Gold medal – first place	2010 Rotterdam	Team
Gold medal – first place	2011 Tokyo	Team
Silver medal – second place	2010 Rotterdam	Parallel bars
Asian Games
Gold medal – first place	2002 Busan	Team
Gold medal – first place	2002 Busan	Pommel horse
Gold medal – first place	2002 Busan	Horizontal bar
Gold medal – first place	2010 Guangzhou	Team
Gold medal – first place	2010 Guangzhou	All-around
Gold medal – first place	2010 Guangzhou	Pommel horse
Bronze medal – third place	2010 Guangzhou	Horizontal bar
National Games
Gold medal – first place	2009 Jinan	All-around
Silver medal – second place	2005 Nanjing	Pommel Horse
Bronze medal – third place	2009 Jinan	Parallel bars

Teng Haibin (simplified Chinese: 滕海滨; traditional Chinese: 滕海濱; pinyin: Téng Hǎibīn; born January 2, 1985, in Beijing) is a Chinese gymnast. He is a two time world champion as well as an Olympic gold medalist in the pommel horse.

He is married to Olympic all-around bronze medalist Zhang Nan, and they have a daughter.

Teng is the personal coach of Olympic Champion Zou Jingyuan and World Champion Xiao Ruoteng.

== See also ==
- Gymnastics at the 2004 Summer Olympics
