= Mutsumi Harada =

Japanese gymnast (born 1975)

- 原田 睦巳
- Born: 24 September 1975 (age 50) Kyoto Prefecture, Japan
- Height: 1.72 m (5 ft 8 in)

Gymnastics career
- Discipline: Men's artistic gymnastics
- Country represented: Japan
- Gym: Juntendo University
Medal record
Representing Japan
Asian Games
Bronze medal – third place	1998 Bangkok	Team
Bronze medal – third place	2002 Busan	Team

Mutsumi Harada (原田睦巳, Harada Mutsumi; born 24 September 1975) is a Japanese gymnast. In the 1998 Asian Games, he won a bronze medal in the team event. He competed at the 2000 Summer Olympics.
