= Kim Seung-il (gymnast) =

South Korean artistic gymnast

- 김승일
- Born: 9 May 1985 (age 41) Gwangju, South Korea
- Height: 1.71 m (5 ft 7 in)

Gymnastics career
- Discipline: Men's artistic gymnastics
- Country represented: South Korea
- Club: Gwanju City Hall
Medal record
Men's artistic gymnastics
Representing South Korea
Asian Games
Gold medal – first place	2002 Busan	Floor
Silver medal – second place	2002 Busan	Team
Silver medal – second place	2002 Busan	Parallel Bars
Bronze medal – third place	2006 Doha	Team

Korean name
- Hangul: 김승일
- RR: Gim Seungil
- MR: Kim Sŭngil

Kim Seung-il (Korean: 김승일; born 9 May 1985) is a South Korean gymnast. He is the 2002 Asian Games gold medalist on floor exercise. Kim was part of the South Korean team that won the bronze medal in the team event at the 2006 Asian Games. He competed for South Korea at the 2004, 2008 and 2012 Olympic Games.
