= Takehiro Kashima =

Japanese gymnast (born 1980)

- Born: July 16, 1980 (age 46) Abeno-ku, Osaka, Osaka Prefecture, Japan

Gymnastics career
- Discipline: Men's artistic gymnastics
- Country represented: Japan
- College team: Juntendo University
- Retired: December 2008
Medal record
Olympic Games
Gold medal – first place	2004 Athens	Team
Silver medal – second place	2008 Beijing	Team competition
Bronze medal – third place	2004 Athens	Pommel horse
World Championships
Gold medal – first place	2003 Anaheim	Horizontal bar
Gold medal – first place	2003 Anaheim	Pommel horse
Bronze medal – third place	2002 Debrecen	Pommel horse
Bronze medal – third place	2003 Anaheim	Team
Bronze medal – third place	2005 Melbourne	Pommel horse
Asian Games
Bronze medal – third place	2002 Busan	Team
Bronze medal – third place	2002 Busan	Pommel horse

Takehiro Kashima (鹿島 丈博, Kashima Takehiro; born July 16, 1980 in Osaka) is a Japanese gymnast, world champion and Olympic champion.

== Olympics ==
Kashima won a gold medal in the team all-around and a bronze medal in pommel-horse at the 2004 Summer Olympics in Athens. At the 2008 Summer Olympics in Beijing, he won a silver medal in the team all-around.

== World championships ==
Kashima won a bronze medal in pommel horse at the 2002 World Artistic Gymnastics Championships in Debrecen. At the 2003 World Artistic Gymnastics Championships in Anaheim he won a gold medal in high bar, a gold medal in the pommel horse, and a bronze medal with Japan in the team final. He won a bronze medal in pommel horse at the 2005 World Artistic Gymnastics Championships in Melbourne.
