= Kim Hyon-il =

North Korean gymnast (born 1976)

- Born: 28 December 1976 (age 49) Sosong-guyok, Pyongyang, North Korea
- Height: 1.62 m (5 ft 4 in)

Gymnastics career
- Discipline: Men's artistic gymnastics
- Country represented: North Korea
- Gym: University Club
Medal record
Representing North Korea
Asian Games
| Gold medal – first place | 2002 Busan | Pommel Horse |

Kim Hyon-il (born 28 December 1976) is a North Korean gymnast. He is the gold medalist on pommel horse in the 2002 Asian Games. He competed at the 2004 Summer Olympics.
