= Lee Sun-sung =

South Korean gymnast (born 1980)

- 이선성
- Alternative name: Lee Seon-seong
- Born: 26 December 1980 (age 45) Gyeonggi-do, South Korea
- Height: 1.65 m (5 ft 5 in)

Gymnastics career
- Discipline: Men's artistic gymnastics
- Country represented: South Korea
- Club: Suwonaicheong
Medal record
Representing South Korea
Asian Games
Silver medal – second place	2002 Busan	Team

Lee Sun-sung (born 26 December 1980) is a South Korean gymnast. In the 2002 Asian Games, he won a silver medal in the team event. He competed at the 2004 Summer Olympics, placing 71st in the individual all-around and 4th in the team all-around competition.
