= North Korea at the 2002 Asian Games =

- IOC code: PRK
- NOC: Olympic Committee of the Democratic People's Republic of Korea

in Busan
- Flag bearer: Ri Chong-hui
- Medals Ranked 9th: Gold 9 Silver 11 Bronze 13 Total 33

Asian Games appearances (overview)
- 1974; 1978; 1982; 1986; 1990; 1994; 1998; 2002; 2006; 2010; 2014; 2018; 2022; 2026

North Korea (officially the Democratic People's Republic of Korea) participated in the 2002 Asian Games held in Busan, South Korea, from September 29 to October 14, 2002. Their participation marked their sixth Asian Games appearance. The North Korean delegation consisted of 318 people (184 competitors and 134 officials). North Korean athletes won total nine gold, eleven silver, and thirteen bronze medals. North Korea finished ninth in the final medal table standings.

== Background ==
North Korea debuted in the Asian Games in 1974 in Tehran, Iran. Due to the legacy of bitterness in the relationships between North Korea and its two neighboring countries, South Korea and Japan, North Korea did not participate in the 1986 and 1994 Asian Games hosted by South Korea and Japan, respectively. This was the first time in the history that North Korea competed in an international sporting event hosted by South Korea. North Korea also boycotted the 1988 Summer Olympics held in the national capital of South Korea, Seoul.

National Olympic Committee of North Korea, Olympic Committee of the Democratic People's Republic of Korea, selected a delegation consisting of 184 athletes (97 men and 87 women), and 134 officials (122 men and 12 women).

== Medals ==
North Korean athletes won medals in 10 different sports and disciplines: athletics, diving, football (soccer), gymnastics, judo, rowing, shooting, table tennis, weightlifting, and wrestling. Nine gold medals were won by North Korean athletes in the Games, two in each gymnastics and shooting, and one medal in each athletics, football, judo, table tennis, and weightlifting.

== See also ==
- North Korea at the 2004 Summer Olympics
