= Lin Yung-hsi =

Taiwanese gymnast

- 林 永錫
- Born: 26 March 1979 (age 47)
- Height: 1.64 m (5 ft 5 in)

Gymnastics career
- Discipline: Men's artistic gymnastics
- Country represented: Chinese Taipei

Lin Yung-hsi (simplified Chinese: 林永锡; traditional Chinese: 林永錫; born 26 March 1979) is a Taiwanese gymnast. He competed at the 2000 Summer Olympics.
