= Hiroyuki Tomita =

Japanese artistic gymnast

- Full name: Hiroyuki Tomita
- Alternative name: 冨田洋之
- Born: November 21, 1980 (age 45) Osaka
- Height: 166 cm (5 ft 5 in)

Gymnastics career
- Discipline: Men's artistic gymnastics
- Country represented: Japan
- College team: Juntendo University
- Club: Central Sports Club
- Head coach: Minoru Kanou
- Assistant coach: Yoshihiro Saito
- Retired: December 2008
Medal record
Men's artistic gymnastics
Olympic Games
Gold medal – first place	2004 Athens	Team
Silver medal – second place	2004 Athens	Parallel bars
Silver medal – second place	2008 Beijing	Team
World Championships
Gold medal – first place	2005 Melbourne	All-Around
Silver medal – second place	2006 Aarhus	All-Around
Silver medal – second place	2006 Aarhus	Parallel bars
Silver medal – second place	2007 Stuttgart	Team
Bronze medal – third place	2003 Anaheim	Team
Bronze medal – third place	2003 Anaheim	All-around
Bronze medal – third place	2006 Aarhus	Team
Asian Games
Gold medal – first place	2002 Busan	Parallel bars
Gold medal – first place	2006 Doha	Pommel horse
Silver medal – second place	2006 Doha	Team
Bronze medal – third place	2002 Busan	Team
Bronze medal – third place	2002 Busan	Rings
Bronze medal – third place	2006 Doha	All-around

Hiroyuki Tomita (Japanese: 冨田洋之; born November 21, 1980) is a Japanese gymnast. Tomita won three Olympic medals at the 2004 and 2008 Olympics.

== Personal life ==
Tomita began gymnastics at the age of eight with his mother getting him started into the sport. He attended Rakunan High School and began competing in the All-Japan Highschool Games in 1996. In this first competition, he ranked 10th in the all-around. The next year saw a rise in Tomita's competition results with a 1st in the all-around. He participated in the 1997 All-Japan Junior Championships with a 9th in the all-around. Tomita continued to dominate the All-Japan Highschool Games, winning 1st in the all-around in 1998, and placing 1st in the events such as the high bar (which would later become his signature event), the parallel bars (where he would later win an Olympic medal), and the pommel horse. After graduating from Ronan High School, he attended Juntendo University. His hobbies include; watching baseball and football. In a test conducted in 2006, Tomita was shown to have less than 2% body fat. Tomita did gymnastics drills and exercises exclusively with no weight training.

== Gymnastics career ==
Tomita made his debut in world championships competition at the 2002 World Championships. On this competition, he placed 4th in the event finals of still rings. The following year, he was a member of the Japanese men's team which won a bronze in the 2003 World Championships. He also won the bronze medal in the men's all-around in the same competition, establishing himself as one of Japan's top male gymnasts, with his star teammate, Naoya Tsukahara, ranking only 7th in the all-around.

Owing to his elegant, clean, and crisp gymnastics style, Tomita received the "Longines Prize for Elegance" on September 7, 2007, in Stuttgart, Germany, along with Shawn Johnson. The prize is given in recognition of athletes who demonstrate remarkable elegance in the course of an international competition at world level; the decision was unanimous. In addition to the trophy, designed by the Swiss artist Piero Travaglini, recipients also receive a wristwatch from the Longines Evidenza collection and a check for US$5,000.

== 2004 Olympics ==
In his first Olympics, Tomita led the men's team in an upset when the Japanese team captured the Olympic title for the first time since 1976, winning over the highly favored Chinese men's team. Tomita ranked 6th in the all-around. Tomita qualified for the event finals in parallel bars, rings, and pommel horse. He won a silver in the parallel bars.

== 2004–2008 ==
The next year, in the 2005 World Championships in Melbourne, Tomita established himself as the top gymnast in the world by claiming the all-around title. Tomita's win made him the first Japanese gymnast in 31 years to win the men's World Championship. Tomita went into the final rotation more than one point ahead and finished on the high bar routine, with a total of 56.698 points. Tomita's teammate, Hisashi Mizutori, claimed the men's all-around silver medal, establishing Japan as a serious men's gymnastics power.

In the 2006 World Championships, Tomita missed a full-twisting Kovacs on high bar in the team competition. The Japanese men's team wound up third. In the all-around competition, Tomita was ranked third after five apparatus events. His last event was the high bar where he fell in the team competition. Tomita gave an inspired performance and won the silver, behind Chinese gymnast, Yang Wei. He also won a silver on parallel bars, with the Japanese team winning the bronze team medal.

In the 2007 World Championships, the men's teams of Japan and China established a rivalry for the top men's team spot that would find China at the top and Japan with the silver team medal. Tomita did not fare well in the all-around competition, placing 12th, with teammate Hisashi Mizutori claiming the all-around bronze. Tomita qualified for the event finals in the high bar, rings and pommel horse, but did not win a medal in these events.

== 2008 Olympics ==
The top two spot of China and Japan was contested in this Olympics with Japan as the reigning Olympic men's team gold medalist, and with Tomita as the most senior men's team member, and leader. China's men's team won the gold medal with a team total of 286.125, over seven points more than Japan's total of 278.875, which was only good enough for the silver medal.

Based on the preliminary rounds of the competition, Tomita finished sixth in the all-around qualifier. Kōhei Uchimura and Koki Sakamoto finished ahead of him, ranking fourth and fifth respectively. Tomita fell on vault in the qualifier, thus finishing .050 behind his teammate, Koki Sakamoto. The top 24 gymnasts based on the preliminary results would qualify to compete in the all-around, because of the rule that only the top two qualifiers of each country would advance to the all-around competition, it appeared that Tomita would not continue to the all-around finals, with his teammates Uchimura and Sakamoto competing instead. However, Japanese head coach, Koji Gushiken, announced that Tomita would replace Sakamoto and compete in the all-around, owing to his experience.

In the all-around competition, Tomita was in medal contention until on his third event, still rings, an accident caused him to crash on the mat from the rings. Tomita was shown to be in pain after his fall and was later observed to be applying an ice pack to his neck. Apparently, the accident caused Tomita to injure his neck, shoulder and lower back. Tomita however continued with the competition and performed well in the last three events lined up. In the end, French gymnast Benoît Caranobe edged out Tomita for an all-around bronze by 0.175. Tomita finished 4th. In an interview, Tomita said that did not give up until the end as he had been given the opportunity to compete in the event by taking the place of teammate Koki Sakamoto, who had a better score than he did in the qualifying.

Tomita qualified for the men's high bar event finals and finished sixth.

== Retirement and final competition ==
In a press conference on November 10, 2008, Tomita announced his retirement from the sport. Tomita cited the decline of his strength and the inability to continue performing gymnastics at a high level as the reason for his retirement. Tomita's final competition as an elite gymnast was in the World Cup Final in Madrid, Spain, where the only event championships were contested with no all-around competition. Tomita competed in both the parallel bars and high bar competition. Tomita was 6th at the parallel bars because of some visible mistakes. In his final competition in the high bar, Tomita performed with his signature skills and elegance, the only obvious error he committed was when he touched his hand to the mat after his dismount. Nevertheless, he capped this final competition with a bronze medal.

== Coaching career ==
Tomita started his coaching career in the spring of 2009, becoming the head coach at Juntendo University. He works with gymnasts like Koki Sakamoto and Yosuke Hoshi. Aside from coaching, he works as assistant professor of health and sports science at Juntendo University. In February 2009, Tomita received official certification allowing him to judge gymnastic competitions.
