= Kim Dae-eun (gymnast) =

South Korean gymnast (born 1984)

- Born: September 17, 1984 (age 41) Yeonggwang, South Korea
- Height: 160 cm (5 ft 3 in)

Gymnastics career
- Discipline: Men's artistic gymnastics
- Country represented: South Korea
- College team: Korea National Sport University
- Club: Gwangju City Hall
- Head coach: Lee Joo-hyung
- Choreographer: Lee Joo-hyung
- Retired: yes
Medal record
Representing South Korea
Men's artistic gymnastics
Olympic Games
Silver medal – second place	2004 Athens	All-around
World Championships
Gold medal – first place	2007 Stuttgart	Parallel bars
Asian Games
Gold medal – first place	2006 Doha	Parallel bars
Silver medal – second place	2002 Busan	Team
Bronze medal – third place	2002 Busan	Vault
Bronze medal – third place	2006 Doha	Team

Korean name
- Hangul: 김대은
- Hanja: 金大恩
- RR: Gim Daeeun
- MR: Kim Taeŭn

Kim Dae-eun (born September 17, 1984) is a South Korean gymnast.

Kim attended the Korea National Sport University. He won the silver medal in the men's artistic individual all-around at the 2004 Athens Olympics, and his loss to American Paul Hamm by a 0.012 margin was the closest in men's Olympic all-around history, though tied by Tatiana Gutsu's win over Shannon Miller in 1992. At the 2006 Asian Games, Kim tied with Yang Wei of China for the gold medal on parallel bars and was part of the South Korean team that won the bronze medal in the team event. Kim tied with Mitja Petkovšek from Slovenia for the gold medal on the parallel bars at the 2007 World Artistic Gymnastics Championships.
