= Feng Jing =

Chinese gymnast (born 1985)

- Born: 15 January 1985 (age 41)

Gymnastics career
- Discipline: Men's artistic gymnastics
- Country represented: China
Medal record
Representing China
World Championships
Gold medal – first place	2001 Ghent	All-around
Gold medal – first place	2006 Aarhus	Team
Asian Games
Gold medal – first place	2002 Busan	Team
Gold medal – first place	2006 Doha	Team

Feng Jing (Chinese: 冯敬, born 15 January 1985) is a Chinese gymnast. He's the youngest mens all-around champion in the history of the Artistic Gymnastics World Championships, winning at age 16 in 2001. His victory surprised journalists; the Chinese Gymnastics Association sent an inexperienced team to the World Championships that year, preferring to send its most experienced gymnasts to the National Games instead. Feng upset veteran competitors like Ivan Ivankov and Yordan Yovchev en route to the title.

Feng was also part of the Chinese team that won the gold medal in the team event at the 2006 World Artistic Gymnastics Championships and the 2006 Asian Games.
