= Kim Dong-hwa =

South Korean gymnast (born 1976)

- 김동화
- Born: 21 March 1976 (age 50) South Korea
- Height: 1.65 m (5 ft 5 in)

Gymnastics career
- Discipline: Men's artistic gymnastics
- Country represented: South Korea
- Club: Hanyang University; Ulsan Chung Ward Office
Medal record
Representing South Korea
Asian Games
Silver medal – second place	1998 Bangkok	Team
Silver medal – second place	1998 Bangkok	Floor Exercise

Korean name
- Hangul: 김동화
- RR: Gim Donghwa
- MR: Kim Tonghwa

Kim Dong-hwa (born 21 March 1976) is a South Korean gymnast. He competed at the 1996 Summer Olympics, the 2000 Summer Olympics and the 2004 Summer Olympics.
