= Liang Fuliang =

Chinese artistic gymnast

- Born: 12 January 1983 (age 43)

Gymnastics career
- Discipline: Men's artistic gymnastics
- Country represented: China
Medal record
World Championships
Gold medal – first place	2006 Aarhus	Team
Gold medal – first place	2007 Stuttgart	Team
Bronze medal – third place	2005 Melbourne	Floor Exercise
Asian Games
Gold medal – first place	2002 Busan	Team
Gold medal – first place	2006 Doha	Team
Silver medal – second place	2002 Busan	All-around
Silver medal – second place	2002 Busan	Floor Exercise
Silver medal – second place	2006 Doha	Floor Exercise
National Games
Gold medal – first place	2005 Nanjing	Team
Gold medal – first place	2005 Nanjing	Floor Exercise
Bronze medal – third place	2001 Guangzhou	Parallel Bars
Bronze medal – third place	2009 Jinan	Floor Exercise

Liang Fuliang (Chinese: 梁富亮, born 12 January 1983) is a Chinese gymnast. Liang was part of the Chinese team that won the gold medal in the team event at the 2006 World Artistic Gymnastics Championships and the 2006 Asian Games.
