= Yang Wei (gymnast) =

Chinese artistic gymnast

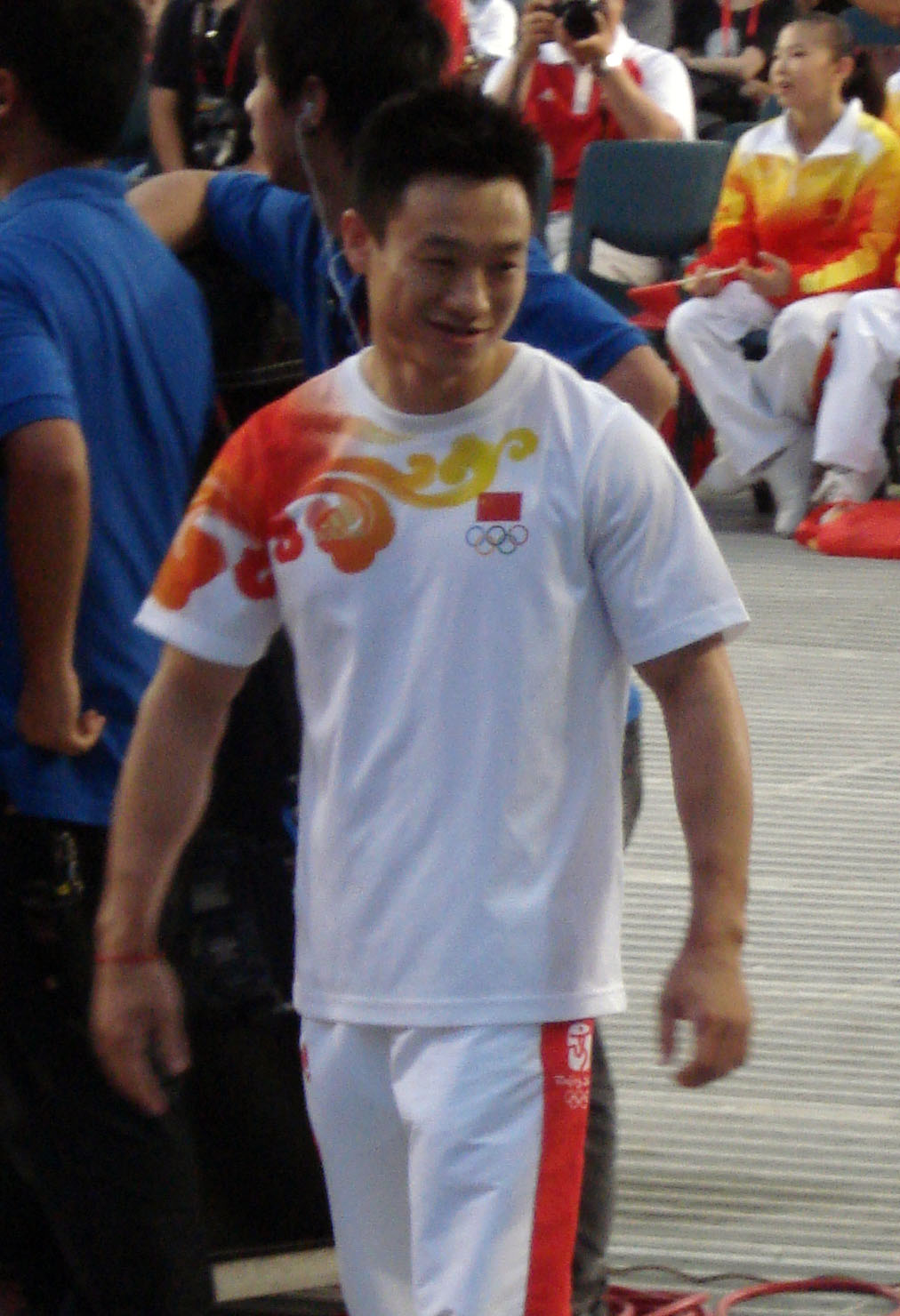

Personal information
- Full name: Yang Wei
- Born: February 8, 1980 (age 46) Xiantao, Hubei, China
- Height: 160 cm (5 ft 3 in)

Gymnastics career
- Discipline: Men's artistic gymnastics
- Country represented: China
- Club: China National School
- Head coach: Huang Yubin
- Assistant coach: Wang Guoqin
- Retired: June 2009
Medal record
Representing China
Olympic Games
Gold medal – first place	2000 Sydney	Team
Gold medal – first place	2008 Beijing	Team
Gold medal – first place	2008 Beijing	All-around
Silver medal – second place	2000 Sydney	All-around
Silver medal – second place	2008 Beijing	Rings
World Championships
Gold medal – first place	1999 Tianjin	Team
Gold medal – first place	2003 Anaheim	Team
Gold medal – first place	2006 Aarhus	Team
Gold medal – first place	2006 Aarhus	All-around
Gold medal – first place	2006 Aarhus	Parallel bars
Gold medal – first place	2007 Stuttgart	Team
Gold medal – first place	2007 Stuttgart	All-around
Silver medal – second place	2003 Anaheim	All-around
Bronze medal – third place	1999 Tianjin	High bar
Bronze medal – third place	2002 Debrecen	Vault
Asian Games
Gold medal – first place	1998 Bangkok	Team
Gold medal – first place	1998 Bangkok	Floor Exercise
Gold medal – first place	2002 Busan	Team
Gold medal – first place	2002 Busan	All-around
Gold medal – first place	2006 Doha	Team
Gold medal – first place	2006 Doha	All-around
Gold medal – first place	2006 Doha	Rings
Gold medal – first place	2006 Doha	Parallel bars
Silver medal – second place	1998 Bangkok	All-Around
Silver medal – second place	2002 Busan	Vault
Bronze medal – third place	2002 Busan	Floor
National Games
Gold medal – first place	2001 Guangzhou	All-around
Silver medal – second place	2001 Guangzhou	Team
Silver medal – second place	2005 Nanjing	All-around
Bronze medal – third place	2001 Guangzhou	Floor exercise
Bronze medal – third place	2001 Guangzhou	Horizontal bar

Yang Wei (Chinese: 杨威; pinyin: Yáng Wēi; born February 8, 1980, in Xiantao, Hubei) is a Chinese gymnast.

== Gymnastics career ==
Yang Wei won the silver medal in the individual all-around competition and won the gold in the team event at the 2000 Olympics in Sydney.

In 2003, he again won the gold in the team event and silver in the all-around competition at the 2003 World Artistic Gymnastics Championships in Anaheim.

At the 2004 Olympics in Athens, his world championship-winning team finished fifth after many of them fell. Wei was also the favorite to win the gold medal at the Individual All-Around in Athens as well, but a fall from the high bar earned him a low score of 8.975 and put him out of medal contention. He placed seventh that night. The Chinese team redeemed itself by taking gold in the 2008 Olympics in Beijing, beating out Japan and the United States.

Yang returned to form at the 2006 World Artistic Gymnastics Championships in Aarhus, by winning gold in the team event, individual all-around and parallel bars competitions. He also won gold medals in the team event, individual all-around, rings, and parallel bars competitions at the 2006 Asian Games.

He successfully defended his team and all-around titles at the 2007 World Artistic Gymnastics Championships in Stuttgart, and won the all-around and rings at the Chinese National Championships in 2007 and 2008.

Yang Wei won gold in the individual all-around and the team final at the 2008 Olympics in Beijing. He also won a silver in the rings event final and placed fourth in the pommel horse event final.

Yang Wei is best known for his impressive difficulty scores across the six events.

== Personal life ==
Yang Wei has a long-time relationship with former gymnast Yang Yun, who is an Olympic bronze medalist (uneven bars) for China, and now a CCTV reporter. In June 2006, Yang Wei invited Yang Yun to a news conference, which turned out to be a ploy for him to surprise her with a proposal. The two married on November 6, 2008. Their son, Yang Wenchang (杨文昌), was born in November 2009. Their twin daughters were born in 2017.
