= Yang Tae-young =

South Korean artistic gymnast (born 1980)

Yang Tae-Young
- Born: July 8, 1980 (age 46) Mapo-gu, Seoul, South Korea

Gymnastics career
- Discipline: Men's artistic gymnastics
- Country represented: South Korea
- Retired: yes
Medal record
Representing South Korea
Men's gymnastics
Olympic Games
Bronze medal – third place	2004 Athens	All-around
Asian Games
Silver medal – second place	2002 Busan	Team
Bronze medal – third place	2006 Asian Games	Team

Yang Tae-Young (Korean: 양태영, born July 8, 1980) is a South Korean artistic gymnast and a bronze-medalist at the 2004 Athens Olympics.

Yang was born in Seoul, and made his Gymnastics World Championships debut at the 2001 World Artistic Gymnastics Championships in Ghent. He is best known for being part of the 2004 Olympics judging controversy in the all-around event where a scoring error placed him in third place behind his teammate and silver-medalist Kim Dae-Eun and gold-medalist American Paul Hamm.

== Personal life ==
Yang was born in Seoul in 1980. He has a brother, Yang Tae-Seok who is also a gymnast.

== Gymnastics career ==
Yang began practicing gymnastics in middle school, a relatively late age compared to other competitive artistic gymnasts.

Yang first competed at the World Artistic Gymnastics Championships in 2001, placing eighth in the team event. At the 2002 Asian Games in Busan, he won the silver medal in the team event.

He competed at the 2003 World Artistic Gymnastics Championships in Anaheim, helping South Korea qualify a team to the 2004 Olympics by finishing in twelfth place.

At the 2004 Olympics, the South Korean team placed in fourth in the team event. Yang placed in tenth on the high bar and won the bronze medal in the all-around, controversially missing out on gold due to a judging error.

He won a bronze medal at the team event in the 2006 Asian Games.

== 2004 Olympics controversy ==
Yang is perhaps best known for being one of the athletes involved in a major judging scandal at the 2004 Olympics. In the all-around, Yang finished third, behind his teammate Kim Dae-Eun and American Paul Hamm.

When Yang performed on the parallel bars, one of his elements was mistaken for a simpler skill. Consequently, his routine only received a start value of 9.9. The identical routine had received a 10.0 SV in both the team qualifying and team finals sessions at the Olympics. If it had been valued at a 10.0 during the all-around, and the rest of the meet had proceeded the same way, Yang might have finished in first place.

The Korean Olympic Committee, Yang and his coaches filed a protest about the results, and an investigation was opened. After reviewing the situation, International Gymnastics Federation (FIG) officials acknowledged that the SV for the routine had indeed been incorrectly calculated, and suspended the three judges responsible for the error but ruled that there was no way to change the results after the meet had concluded.

A major point of contention was the time at which the score protest was filed. Under FIG rules, score protests must be filed immediately, during the actual competition, to be considered. The Korean Olympic Committee claimed that one of the judges on the parallel bars panel, Kim Dong Min, noticed that the Start Value was amiss during the competition, informed Yang's coaches directly after the meet, and that a protest was lodged around the time of the medal ceremony. The FIG stated that in fact, no protest had been filed until later in the day, when the athletes were leaving the arena.

Members of the Korean delegation consulted the President of the International Olympic Committee (IOC), Dr. Jacques Rogge. The IOC stated that it would not intervene, and would uphold the FIG's decision, unless there was evidence of deliberate underscoring or other judging impropriety. The possibility of awarding a second gold medal to Yang was discussed, but was not endorsed by Rogge. The United States Olympic Committee also withdrew their support of this idea after FIG President Bruno Grandi suggested that Hamm give his medal to Yang as a gesture of goodwill. The USOC maintained that Hamm had done nothing personally wrong, he had merely competed in the meet, and that he should not be punished for the errors of the gymnastics officials. Furthermore, Grandi's suggestion went against the FIG's official ruling on the case.

On August 28, 2004, Yang and the Korean Olympic Committee filed an appeal with the Court of Arbitration for Sport. Arbitrators Michael J. Beloff (United Kingdom), Dirk-Reiner Martens (Germany) and Sharad Rao (Kenya) deliberated over the case for several months, during which time Paul Hamm was called to Lausanne to speak at a hearing. On October 21, 2004, the CAS announced that the case was being dismissed.

The two main reasons given for the dismissal of the case were:

- Whether the score protest had occurred according to the KOC or the FIG's version of the events, it had still taken place after the conclusion of the competition, and thus was not valid under FIG rules.
- The judging could be considered a "field of play" decision, and could not be rescinded after the fact to change the results.

After the Olympics, the Korean Olympic Committee awarded Yang a symbolic gold medal, expressing their support. They also gave him the same $20,000 prize awarded to gold medalists.

== Post-competitive career ==
After retiring from competition, Yang went on to continue coaching gymnastics.
