= Stepan Gorbachev =

Kazakhstani gymnast (born 1983)

- Степан Горбачёв
- Born: 2 October 1983 (age 42) Alma-Ata, Kazakh SSR, Soviet Union
- Height: 1.71 m (5 ft 7 in)

Gymnastics career
- Discipline: Men's artistic gymnastics
- Country represented: Kazakhstan

Stepan Gorbachev (Степан Владимирович Горбачев, born 2 October 1983) is a Kazakhstani gymnast. He competed at the 2012 Summer Olympics.
