= Ng Shu Wai =

Malaysian gymnast (born 1985)

- Born: 27 May 1985 (age 41) Taiping, Perak, Malaysia
- Height: 1.65 m (5 ft 5 in)

Gymnastics career
- Discipline: Men's artistic gymnastics
- Country represented: Malaysia
- Gym: Gemilang
Medal record
Representing Malaysia
Asian Games
Silver medal – second place	2006 Doha	Vault
Commonwealth Games
Silver medal – second place	2002 Manchester	Floor exercise

Ng Shu Wai (born 27 May 1985) is a Malaysian gymnast. He competed at the 2004 Summer Olympics, and is the silver medalist on vault in the 2006 Asian Games.
