= Hisashi Mizutori =

Japanese artistic gymnast

- Born: 22 July 1980 (age 46) Shizuoka, Shizuoka, Japan
- Height: 172 cm (5 ft 8 in)

Gymnastics career
- Discipline: Men's artistic gymnastics
- Country represented: Japan
- Club: Tokushukai Gymnastics Club
- Head coach: Yasunori Tachibana
Medal record
Representing Japan
Artistic Gymnastics
Olympic Games
Gold medal – first place	2004 Athens	Team
World Championships
Silver medal – second place	2005 Melbourne	All-around
Silver medal – second place	2007 Stuttgart	Team
Bronze medal – third place	2006 Aarhus	Team
Bronze medal – third place	2007 Stuttgart	All-around
Bronze medal – third place	2007 Stuttgart	Floor exercise
Bronze medal – third place	2007 Stuttgart	Horizontal bar
Asian Games
Gold medal – first place	2006 Doha	Horizontal bar
Silver medal – second place	2006 Doha	Team
Silver medal – second place	2006 Doha	All-around
Silver medal – second place	2010 Guangzhou	Team
Bronze medal – third place	2002 Busan	Team
Bronze medal – third place	2010 Guangzhou	All-around

Hisashi Mizutori (水鳥 寿思) (born 22 July 1980 in Shizuoka, Shizuoka, Japan) is a Japanese gymnast. He was part of the Japanese team that won the gold medal in the team competition at the 2004 Summer Olympics. He was also part of the team which won the silver medal in the team event at the 2007 World Artistic Gymnastics Championships. At that competition, he also won three individual bronze medals, in the all-around, floor exercise, and horizontal bar.

He is currently a professor at Keio University, Shonan Fujisawa Campus.
