= Irina Kovalchuk =

Ukrainian rhythmic gymnast (b. 1989)

- Ірина Євгенівна Ковальчук
- Full name: Irina Yevhenivna Kovalchuk
- Born: 27 April 1989 (age 37) Havana, Cuba

Gymnastics career
- Discipline: Rhythmic gymnastics
- Country represented: Ukraine (2003-2009)
- Club: Deriugins School
- Head coach: Irina Deriugina
- Retired: yes
Medal record
Representing Ukraine
Rhythmic Gymnastics
World Championships
Silver medal – second place	2005 Baku	Team
Summer Universiade
Gold medal – first place	2007 Bangkok	5 Ropes
Silver medal – second place	2007 Bangkok	Group All-around
Silver medal – second place	2009 Belgrade	3 Ribbons + 2 Ropes
Bronze medal – third place	2009 Belgrade	Group All-around
Bronze medal – third place	2009 Belgrade	5 Hoops

Irina Yevhenivna Kovalchuk (born 27 April 1989) is a retired Ukrainian rhythmic gymnast. She represented her country in international competitions.

== Career ==
Irina was part of the Ukrainian junior group that finished 5th at the European Championships in Riesa, Germany. She debuted as a senior in 2005, when she got to compete the European Championships in Moscow as a member of the group finishing 5th with 5 balls, at the World Championships in Baku as an individual she won silver in the team competition with Anna Bessonova and Natalia Godunko.

In 2006 she was again included into the national group for the European Championships where, along Valentyna Golovina, Polina Kondaurova, Viera Perederiy, Olga Skutarnova and Victoria Zubchenko, took 9th place overall and 8th with 3 hoops & 4 clubs. The same year she topped the All-Around and was 2nd in teams at the Gymnasiada in Athens.

In August 2007 she competed in the Universiade in Bangkok, along Nadya Vasina, Vita Zubchenko, Polina Kondaurova, Inga Kozhokhina and Olha Skuradova, winning silver in the All-Around and gold with 5 ropes, after that she was awarded the state award "For work and achievement". A month later she was selected for the World Championships in Patras, there Irina took 19th place in the All-Around thus earning a spot for Ukraine at the 2008 Olympic Games.

Her last competition was the 2009 Summer Universiade in Belgrade, along Viera Perederiy, Olena Dmytrash, Oksana Petulko, Olga Tsolga and Vita Zubchenko, won bronze in the All-Around and with hoops as well as silver with 3 ribbons & 2 ropes.
