= Polina Kondaurova =

Ukrainian rhythmic gymnast

- Поліна Володимирівна Кондаурова
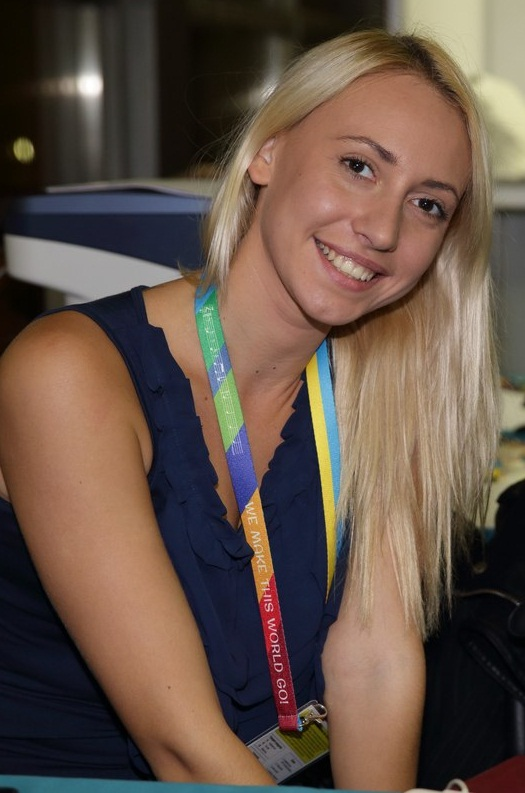

Personal information
- Full name: Polina Volodymyrivna Kondaurova
- Born: 4 June 1988 (age 38) Nikopol, Ukrainian SSR

Gymnastics career
- Discipline: Rhythmic gymnastics
- Country represented: Ukraine (2004-2008)
- Club: Deriugins School
- Head coach: Irina Deriugina
- Retired: yes
Medal record
Representing Ukraine
Rhythmic Gymnastics
Event	1st	2nd	3rd
FIG World Cup	0	0	1
Total	0	0	1
Summer Universiade
Gold medal – first place	2007 Bangkok	5 Ropes
Silver medal – second place	2007 Bangkok	Group All-around

Polina Volodymyrivna Kondaurova (born 4 June 1988) is a retired Ukrainian rhythmic gymnast and judge. She represented her country in international competitions.

== Biography ==
Polina began doing rhythmic gymnastics at the age of 7 in Nikopol at the Elektrometallurg sports club, her first coach was Elena Yastrebova. In 2001, at the age of 13, she entered the Dnepropetrovsk Regional School of Physical Culture (a sports boarding school where athletes live without parents, study and train), coached by Natalya Eremina.

Until the age of 16 she represented the Dnipropetrovsk region in both individual and group modality, winning various medals. In 2004, she joined the national team and moved to Kyiv in order to train at the Deriugins School.

In 2007 she compete in various World Cups as a member of the senior group, finishing 9th overall in Saint Petersburg, 8th in Genoa, 6th in Tel Aviv and won bronze with 3 hoops & 2 clubs at the one in Nizhny Novgorod. In August of the same year she competed in the Universiade in Bangkok. along Nadya Vasina, Vita Zubchenko, Irina Kovalchuk, Inga Kozhokhina and Olha Skuradova, winning silver in the All-Around and gold with 5 ropes, after that she was awarded the state award "For work and achievement". A month later she was selected for the World Championships in Patras, there Polina, Olena Dmytrash, Alina Maksimenko, Viera Perederiy, Oksana Petulko and Vita Zubchenko, were 8th in the All-Around and 5th with 3 hoops & 2 clubs.

In 2008, she ended her sports career due to a knee joint injury and surgery, in the same year she started coaching at the Deriugins School. After the end of her sports career, Polina was invited to work as a model. However, when she had to choose between a career as a trainer and a model, she chose to become a full time coach.

In 2010, she received a master's degree from NUFVSU, majoring in sports biomechanics. Later she became a coach of Youth Sports School No. 3 "Spartak". In 2013 Kondaurova passed the judging seminar and received the first category of national judge.
