= Gymnastics at the 2006 Asian Games – Men's floor =

Men's floor at the 2006 Asian Games
- Venue: Aspire Hall 2
- Date: 2–5 December 2006
- Competitors: 72 from 20 nations

Medalists
gold medal	Zou Kai	China
silver medal	Liang Fuliang	China
bronze medal	Kim Soo-myun	South Korea

The men's floor competition at the 2006 Asian Games in Doha, Qatar was held on 2 and 5 December 2006 at the Aspire Hall 2.

== Schedule ==
All times are Arabia Standard Time (UTC+03:00)

Date	Time	Event
Saturday, 2 December 2006	12:00	Qualification
Tuesday, 5 December 2006	16:00	Final

== Results ==
=== Qualification ===
Rank	Athlete	Score
1	Zou Kai (CHN)	15.600
2	Ri Se-gwang (PRK)	15.400
3	Kim Soo-myun (KOR)	15.350
4	Liang Fuliang (CHN)	15.250
5	Jo Jong-chol (PRK)	15.100
6	Hiroyuki Tomita (JPN)	15.100
7	Kim Seung-il (KOR)	15.100
8	Yoo Won-chul (KOR)	15.050
9	Stepan Gorbachev (KAZ)	15.050
10	Chen Yibing (CHN)	15.000
11	Shun Kuwahara (JPN)	15.000
12	Kim Ji-hoon (KOR)	15.000
13	Yuki Yoshimura (JPN)	15.000
14	Yang Wei (CHN)	14.950
15	Hisashi Mizutori (JPN)	14.800
16	Nguyễn Hà Thanh (VIE)	14.600
17	Feng Jing (CHN)	14.550
18	Kim Kwang-chun (PRK)	14.550
19	Lin Hsiang-wei (TPE)	14.500
20	Kenya Kobayashi (JPN)	14.350
21	Ri Chol-jin (PRK)	14.250
22	Ildar Valeyev (KAZ)	14.250
23	Roel Ramirez (PHI)	14.250
24	Sado Batsiyev (KAZ)	14.200
25	Hadi Khanarinejad (IRI)	14.050
26	Anton Fokin (UZB)	14.000
27	Rartchawat Kaewpanya (THA)	14.000
28	Ro Chol-jin (PRK)	14.000
29	Ng Shu Mun (MAS)	13.900
30	Jad Mazahreh (JOR)	13.900
31	Fadi Bahlawan (SYR)	13.850
32	Sain Autalipov (KAZ)	13.850
33	Huang Yi-hsueh (TPE)	13.750
34	Yap Kiam Bun (MAS)	13.650
35	Mohammad Mehdi Gaeini (IRI)	13.550
36	Keldiyor Hasanov (UZB)	13.500
37	Ahmad Amir Abdulkafi (SYR)	13.450
38	Huang Che-kuei (TPE)	13.350
39	Thitipong Sukdee (THA)	13.350
40	Faisal Al-Othman (KUW)	13.300
41	Hamid Reza Babaei (IRI)	13.250
42	Hầu Trung Linh (VIE)	13.200
43	Ng Shu Wai (MAS)	13.200
44	Sameera Ekanayake (SRI)	13.100
45	Vivek Mishra (IND)	13.100
46	Mohammad Ramezanpour (IRI)	13.100
47	Hoàng Cường (VIE)	13.100
48	Amer Attar (SYR)	13.050
49	Huang Tai-i (TPE)	13.050
50	Jawad Al-Herz (KUW)	13.000
51	Ravshanbek Osimov (UZB)	12.950
52	Deepesh Sahu (IND)	12.900
53	Ooi Wei Siang (MAS)	12.850
54	Nasser Al-Hamad (QAT)	12.800
55	Rohit Jaiswal (IND)	12.700
56	Ashish Kumar (IND)	12.650
57	Mohammad Al-Omran (KUW)	12.600
58	Eranda Nadeera (SRI)	12.600
59	Mayank Srivastava (IND)	12.600
60	Mohammad Abu Saleh (JOR)	12.600
61	Mohammad Daher (SYR)	12.550
62	Maki Al-Mubiareek (KSA)	12.500
63	Muhammad Afzal (PAK)	12.350
64	Mahmood Al-Sadi (QAT)	12.300
65	Ivan Olushev (UZB)	12.200
66	Tariq Abu Ayad (JOR)	12.100
67	Amin Al-Halali (KSA)	12.050
68	Uditha Kumara (SRI)	11.750
69	Khalid Mahmood (PAK)	11.600
70	Abdullah Karam (KUW)	11.600
71	Timur Kurbanbayev (KAZ)	11.500
72	Eranga Asela (SRI)	11.500

=== Final ===
Rank	Athlete	Score
1st place, gold medalist(s)	Zou Kai (CHN)	16.000
2nd place, silver medalist(s)	Liang Fuliang (CHN)	15.800
3rd place, bronze medalist(s)	Kim Soo-myun (KOR)	15.600
4	Ri Se-gwang (PRK)	15.550
5	Kim Seung-il (KOR)	15.200
5	Jo Jong-chol (PRK)	15.200
7	Shun Kuwahara (JPN)	15.175
8	Stepan Gorbachev (KAZ)	14.400
