= Gymnastics at the 2006 Asian Games – Men's pommel horse =

Men's pommel horse at the 2006 Asian Games
- Venue: Aspire Hall 2
- Date: 2–5 December 2006
- Competitors: 70 from 19 nations

Medalists
gold medal	Hiroyuki Tomita	Japan
gold medal	Kim Soo-myun	South Korea
gold medal	Jo Jong-chol	North Korea

The men's pommel horse competition at the 2006 Asian Games in Doha, Qatar was held on 2 and 5 December 2006 at the Aspire Hall 2.

== Schedule ==
All times are Arabia Standard Time (UTC+03:00)

Date	Time	Event
Saturday, 2 December 2006	12:00	Qualification
Tuesday, 5 December 2006	17:00	Final

== Results ==
=== Qualification ===
Rank	Athlete	Score
1	Xiao Qin (CHN)	16.200
2	Yang Wei (CHN)	15.700
3	Huang Che-kuei (TPE)	15.550
4	Kim Ji-hoon (KOR)	15.500
5	Kim Soo-myun (KOR)	15.450
6	Liang Fuliang (CHN)	15.350
7	Hiroyuki Tomita (JPN)	15.350
8	Lin Hsiang-wei (TPE)	15.300
9	Jo Jong-chol (PRK)	15.250
10	Kenya Kobayashi (JPN)	15.150
11	Chen Yibing (CHN)	15.100
12	Hisashi Mizutori (JPN)	15.050
13	Ri Chol-jin (PRK)	15.050
14	Yang Tae-young (KOR)	15.050
15	Yap Kiam Bun (MAS)	15.000
16	Kim Dae-eun (KOR)	14.900
17	Yernar Yerimbetov (KAZ)	14.650
18	Shun Kuwahara (JPN)	14.500
19	Thitipong Sukdee (THA)	14.500
20	Ryosuke Baba (JPN)	14.500
21	Vahid Izadfar (IRI)	14.500
22	Huang Tai-i (TPE)	14.450
23	Fadi Bahlawan (SYR)	14.350
24	Kim Kwang-chun (PRK)	14.300
25	Sado Batsiyev (KAZ)	14.250
26	Ng Shu Wai (MAS)	14.250
27	Ro Chol-jin (PRK)	14.250
28	Mohammad Ramezanpour (IRI)	14.200
29	Trương Minh Sang (VIE)	14.150
30	Kim Seung-il (KOR)	14.100
31	Ildar Valeyev (KAZ)	14.100
32	Anton Fokin (UZB)	14.050
33	Chang Che-wei (TPE)	13.850
34	Feng Jing (CHN)	13.750
35	Roel Ramirez (PHI)	13.600
36	Hamid Reza Babaei (IRI)	13.150
37	Ravshanbek Osimov (UZB)	13.150
38	Ri Se-gwang (PRK)	13.050
39	Ng Shu Mun (MAS)	13.050
40	Rartchawat Kaewpanya (THA)	13.050
41	Ooi Wei Siang (MAS)	13.000
42	Huang Yi-hsueh (TPE)	12.950
43	Nasser Al-Hamad (QAT)	12.900
44	Rohit Jaiswal (IND)	12.900
45	Stepan Gorbachev (KAZ)	12.800
46	Tariq Abu Ayad (JOR)	12.700
47	Uditha Kumara (SRI)	12.600
48	Hadi Khanarinejad (IRI)	12.550
49	Keldiyor Hasanov (UZB)	12.450
50	Ivan Olushev (UZB)	12.400
51	Timur Kurbanbayev (KAZ)	12.400
52	Ashish Kumar (IND)	12.350
53	Amer Attar (SYR)	12.350
54	Mahmood Al-Sadi (QAT)	12.000
55	Deepesh Sahu (IND)	11.900
56	Ahmad Amir Abdulkafi (SYR)	11.900
57	Eranga Asela (SRI)	11.750
58	Mohammad Daher (SYR)	11.600
59	Mayank Srivastava (IND)	11.400
60	Jad Mazahreh (JOR)	11.250
61	Eranda Nadeera (SRI)	10.800
62	Mohammad Al-Omran (KUW)	10.600
63	Vivek Mishra (IND)	10.550
64	Sameera Ekanayake (SRI)	10.400
65	Jawad Al-Herz (KUW)	10.250
66	Muhammad Afzal (PAK)	9.900
67	Abdullah Karam (KUW)	9.850
68	Faisal Al-Othman (KUW)	9.850
69	Mohammad Abu Saleh (JOR)	9.650
70	Khalid Mahmood (PAK)	9.650

=== Final ===
Rank	Athlete	Score
1st place, gold medalist(s)	Hiroyuki Tomita (JPN)	15.375
1st place, gold medalist(s)	Kim Soo-myun (KOR)	15.375
1st place, gold medalist(s)	Jo Jong-chol (PRK)	15.375
4	Huang Che-kuei (TPE)	14.700
5	Xiao Qin (CHN)	14.650
6	Lin Hsiang-wei (TPE)	14.600
7	Yang Wei (CHN)	14.525
8	Kim Ji-hoon (KOR)	12.500
