= Gymnastics at the 2006 Asian Games – Men's rings =

Men's rings at the 2006 Asian Games
- Venue: Aspire Hall 2
- Date: 2–5 December 2006
- Competitors: 70 from 20 nations

Medalists
gold medal	Chen Yibing	China
gold medal	Yang Wei	China
bronze medal	Timur Kurbanbayev	Kazakhstan

The men's rings competition at the 2006 Asian Games in Doha, Qatar was held on 2 and 5 December 2006 at the Aspire Hall 2.

== Schedule ==
All times are Arabia Standard Time (UTC+03:00)

Date	Time	Event
Saturday, 2 December 2006	12:00	Qualification
Tuesday, 5 December 2006	18:00	Final

== Results ==
=== Qualification ===
Rank	Athlete	Score
1	Chen Yibing (CHN)	16.600
2	Yang Wei (CHN)	16.300
3	Hiroyuki Tomita (JPN)	15.950
4	Kim Dae-eun (KOR)	15.600
5	Yuki Yoshimura (JPN)	15.400
6	Timur Kurbanbayev (KAZ)	15.400
7	Feng Jing (CHN)	15.350
8	Yoo Won-chul (KOR)	15.350
9	Hisashi Mizutori (JPN)	15.350
10	Anton Fokin (UZB)	15.050
11	Hamid Reza Babaei (IRI)	15.050
12	Kenya Kobayashi (JPN)	15.000
13	Weng Shih-hang (TPE)	15.000
14	Liang Fuliang (CHN)	14.950
15	Kim Seung-il (KOR)	14.900
16	Ryosuke Baba (JPN)	14.900
17	Ro Chol-jin (PRK)	14.900
18	Yang Tae-young (KOR)	14.750
19	Huang Che-kuei (TPE)	14.700
20	Ri Se-gwang (PRK)	14.550
21	Ri Chol-jin (PRK)	14.500
22	Jo Jong-chol (PRK)	14.500
23	Fadi Bahlawan (SYR)	14.400
24	Huang Yi-hsueh (TPE)	14.150
25	Ildar Valeyev (KAZ)	14.050
26	Kim Soo-myun (KOR)	14.000
27	Nguyễn Minh Tuấn (VIE)	14.000
28	Keldiyor Hasanov (UZB)	14.000
29	Ng Shu Wai (MAS)	13.950
30	Huang Tai-i (TPE)	13.900
31	Mohammad Daher (SYR)	13.700
32	Chang Che-wei (TPE)	13.650
33	Rartchawat Kaewpanya (THA)	13.650
34	Ooi Wei Siang (MAS)	13.650
35	Vahid Izadfar (IRI)	13.550
36	Thitipong Sukdee (THA)	13.500
37	Stepan Gorbachev (KAZ)	13.300
38	Sain Autalipov (KAZ)	13.300
39	Ng Shu Mun (MAS)	13.100
40	Hadi Khanarinejad (IRI)	13.000
41	Mohammad Ramezanpour (IRI)	12.950
42	Raja Roy (IND)	12.950
43	Sado Batsiyev (KAZ)	12.700
44	Ravshanbek Osimov (UZB)	12.650
45	Amer Attar (SYR)	12.600
46	Ashish Kumar (IND)	12.600
47	Hầu Trung Linh (VIE)	12.500
48	Mahmood Al-Sadi (QAT)	12.500
49	Amin Al-Halali (KSA)	12.450
50	Ahmad Amir Abdulkafi (SYR)	12.400
51	Yap Kiam Bun (MAS)	12.350
52	Sameera Ekanayake (SRI)	12.350
53	Deepesh Sahu (IND)	12.250
54	Faisal Al-Othman (KUW)	12.200
55	Maki Al-Mubiareek (KSA)	12.000
56	Mohammad Al-Omran (KUW)	11.850
57	Eranda Nadeera (SRI)	11.750
58	Rohit Jaiswal (IND)	11.600
59	Ivan Olushev (UZB)	11.500
60	Eranga Asela (SRI)	11.400
61	Mayank Srivastava (IND)	11.300
62	Nasser Al-Hamad (QAT)	11.250
63	Khalid Mahmood (PAK)	10.800
64	Roel Ramirez (PHI)	10.750
65	Tariq Abu Ayad (JOR)	10.700
66	Mohammad Abu Saleh (JOR)	10.350
67	Jad Mazahreh (JOR)	10.200
68	Uditha Kumara (SRI)	10.000
69	Muhammad Afzal (PAK)	10.000
70	Abdullah Karam (KUW)	9.600

=== Final ===
Rank	Athlete	Score
1st place, gold medalist(s)	Chen Yibing (CHN)	16.575
1st place, gold medalist(s)	Yang Wei (CHN)	16.575
3rd place, bronze medalist(s)	Timur Kurbanbayev (KAZ)	16.300
4	Hiroyuki Tomita (JPN)	16.100
5	Kim Dae-eun (KOR)	15.800
6	Yuki Yoshimura (JPN)	15.400
7	Yoo Won-chul (KOR)	15.250
8	Hamid Reza Babaei (IRI)	14.900
