= Oleksandr Vorobiov =

Ukrainian artistic gymnast

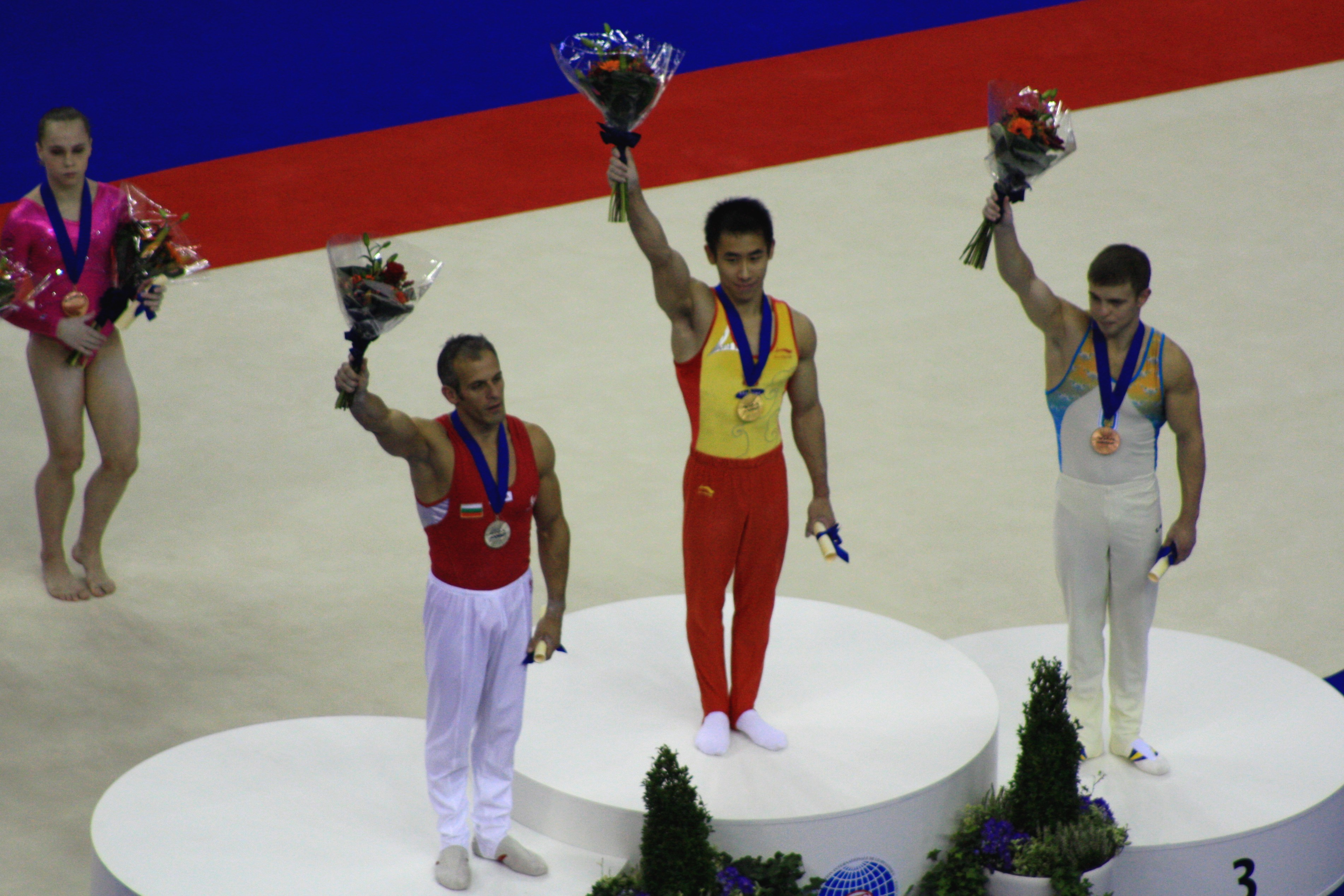
- Vorobiov (right) at the 2009 World Championships

Personal information
- Born: October 5, 1984 (age 41) Dniprodzerzhynsk, Ukrainian SSR, Soviet Union

Gymnastics career
- Discipline: Men's artistic gymnastics
- Country represented: Ukraine
Medal record
Olympic Games
Bronze medal – third place	2008 Beijing	Rings
World Championships
Bronze medal – third place	2009 London	Rings
European Championships
Gold medal – first place	2007 Amsterdam	Rings
Silver medal – second place	2009 Milan	Rings
World Cup Final
Gold medal – first place	2008 Madrid	Rings
Silver medal – second place	2006 São Paulo	Rings
Summer Universiade
Gold medal – first place	2007 Bangkok	Rings
Bronze medal – third place	2007 Bangkok	Team

Oleksandr Vorobiov (born October 5, 1984, in Dniprodzerzhynsk) is a Ukrainian gymnast. He won a bronze medal on rings at the 2008 Summer Olympics.
