= Gymnastics at the 2006 Asian Games – Men's horizontal bar =

Men's horizontal bar at the 2006 Asian Games
- Venue: Aspire Hall 2
- Date: 2–6 December 2006
- Competitors: 66 from 19 nations

Medalists
gold medal	Hisashi Mizutori	Japan
silver medal	Zou Kai	China
bronze medal	Kim Ji-hoon	South Korea

The men's horizontal bar competition at the 2006 Asian Games in Doha, Qatar was held on 2 and 6 December 2006 at the Aspire Hall 2.

== Schedule ==
All times are Arabia Standard Time (UTC+03:00)

Date	Time	Event
Saturday, 2 December 2006	12:00	Qualification
Wednesday, 6 December 2006	18:00	Final

== Results ==
=== Qualification ===
Rank	Athlete	Score
1	Hiroyuki Tomita (JPN)	15.950
2	Kim Ji-hoon (KOR)	15.850
3	Hisashi Mizutori (JPN)	15.850
4	Kim Seung-il (KOR)	15.750
5	Yang Wei (CHN)	15.650
6	Shun Kuwahara (JPN)	15.600
7	Xiao Qin (CHN)	15.550
8	Ryosuke Baba (JPN)	15.500
9	Kim Dae-eun (KOR)	15.300
10	Chen Yibing (CHN)	15.250
11	Kim Soo-myun (KOR)	15.250
12	Zou Kai (CHN)	15.250
13	Ro Chol-jin (PRK)	15.150
14	Feng Jing (CHN)	15.100
15	Kim Kwang-chun (PRK)	15.100
16	Stepan Gorbachev (KAZ)	15.000
17	Anton Fokin (UZB)	14.900
18	Ng Shu Wai (MAS)	14.900
19	Yernar Yerimbetov (KAZ)	14.900
20	Huang Che-kuei (TPE)	14.650
21	Ri Chol-jin (PRK)	14.600
22	Kenya Kobayashi (JPN)	14.550
23	Ildar Valeyev (KAZ)	14.400
24	Fadi Bahlawan (SYR)	14.350
25	Jo Jong-chol (PRK)	14.300
26	Ooi Wei Siang (MAS)	14.300
27	Ng Shu Mun (MAS)	14.250
28	Huang Yi-hsueh (TPE)	14.000
29	Rohit Jaiswal (IND)	13.850
30	Sado Batsiyev (KAZ)	13.800
31	Hadi Khanarinejad (IRI)	13.750
32	Timur Kurbanbayev (KAZ)	13.750
33	Ravshanbek Osimov (UZB)	13.700
34	Chang Che-wei (TPE)	13.600
35	Amer Attar (SYR)	13.450
36	Deepesh Sahu (IND)	13.350
37	Rartchawat Kaewpanya (THA)	13.300
38	Ahmad Amir Abdulkafi (SYR)	13.200
39	Yap Kiam Bun (MAS)	13.150
40	Mohammad Ramezanpour (IRI)	13.100
41	Trương Minh Sang (VIE)	13.050
42	Raja Roy (IND)	12.950
43	Mayank Srivastava (IND)	12.950
44	Mohammad Daher (SYR)	12.950
45	Huang Tai-i (TPE)	12.900
46	Mohammad Abu Saleh (JOR)	12.900
47	Hamid Reza Babaei (IRI)	12.800
48	Ashish Kumar (IND)	12.750
49	Keldiyor Hasanov (UZB)	12.700
50	Roel Ramirez (PHI)	12.600
51	Jad Mazahreh (JOR)	12.500
52	Nasser Al-Hamad (QAT)	12.450
53	Sameera Ekanayake (SRI)	12.250
54	Tariq Abu Ayad (JOR)	12.100
55	Mohammad Mehdi Gaeini (IRI)	12.100
56	Mahmood Al-Sadi (QAT)	11.950
57	Mohammad Al-Omran (KUW)	11.950
58	Yang Tae-young (KOR)	11.800
59	Faisal Al-Othman (KUW)	11.725
60	Eranga Asela (SRI)	11.700
61	Abdullah Karam (KUW)	11.600
62	Eranda Nadeera (SRI)	11.300
63	Khalid Mahmood (PAK)	11.000
64	Uditha Kumara (SRI)	10.700
65	Muhammad Afzal (PAK)	10.700
66	Ivan Olushev (UZB)	9.650

=== Final ===
Rank	Athlete	Score
1st place, gold medalist(s)	Hisashi Mizutori (JPN)	16.075
2nd place, silver medalist(s)	Zou Kai (CHN)	15.950
3rd place, bronze medalist(s)	Kim Ji-hoon (KOR)	15.725
4	Yang Wei (CHN)	15.500
5	Hiroyuki Tomita (JPN)	15.025
5	Kim Seung-il (KOR)	15.025
7	Ro Chol-jin (PRK)	14.675
8	Kim Kwang-chun (PRK)	10.875
