= Gymnastics at the 2010 Asian Games – Men's floor =

Men's floor at the 2010 Asian Games
- Venue: Asian Games Town Gymnasium
- Date: 13–16 November 2010
- Competitors: 68 from 20 nations

Medalists
gold medal	Zhang Chenglong	China
gold medal	Kim Soo-myun	South Korea
bronze medal	Ashish Kumar	India

The men's floor competition at the 2010 Asian Games in Guangzhou, China was held on 13 and 16 November 2010 at the Asian Games Town Gymnasium.

== Schedule ==
All times are China Standard Time (UTC+08:00)

Date	Time	Event
Saturday, 13 November 2010	09:30	Qualification
Tuesday, 16 November 2010	19:30	Final

== Results ==
=== Qualification ===
Rank	Athlete	Score
1	Zhang Chenglong (CHN)	15.350
2	Kim Soo-myun (KOR)	15.250
3	Feng Zhe (CHN)	14.900
4	Lü Bo (CHN)	14.750
5	Ashish Kumar (IND)	14.750
6	Teng Haibin (CHN)	14.700
7	Kyoichi Watanabe (JPN)	14.700
8	Yoo Won-chul (KOR)	14.650
9	Hisashi Mizutori (JPN)	14.550
10	Kim Ji-hoon (KOR)	14.450
11	Ryotaka Deguchi (JPN)	14.400
12	Shun Kuwahara (JPN)	14.400
13	Otabek Masharipov (UZB)	14.350
14	Mohammad Ramezanpour (IRI)	14.350
15	Nguyễn Hà Thanh (VIE)	14.300
16	Kim Hee-hoon (KOR)	14.300
17	Stepan Gorbachev (KAZ)	14.250
18	Chen Chih-yu (TPE)	14.250
19	Đặng Nam (VIE)	14.200
20	Hoàng Cường (VIE)	14.200
21	Nashwan Al-Harazi (YEM)	14.200
22	Eduard Shaulov (KAZ)	14.150
23	Yernar Yerimbetov (KAZ)	14.100
24	Phạm Phước Hưng (VIE)	14.100
25	Hadi Khanarinejad (IRI)	14.100
26	Anton Fokin (UZB)	14.100
27	Yang Hak-seon (KOR)	14.050
28	Stanislav Valiyev (KAZ)	14.000
29	Maxim Petrishko (KAZ)	13.900
30	Weena Chokpaoumpai (THA)	13.900
31	Woranad Kaewpanya (THA)	13.850
32	Ehsan Khodadadi (IRI)	13.750
33	Mahmood Al-Sadi (QAT)	13.700
34	Ivan Olushev (UZB)	13.650
35	Tu Yu-chen (TPE)	13.650
36	Takuya Nakase (JPN)	13.650
37	Shek Wai Hung (HKG)	13.450
38	Devesh Kumar (IND)	13.450
39	Ahmed Al-Dyani (QAT)	13.400
40	Amir Azami (IRI)	13.400
41	Daulet Narmetov (UZB)	13.350
42	Trương Minh Sang (VIE)	13.300
43	Kittipong Yudee (THA)	13.300
44	Ganbatyn Erdenebold (MGL)	13.250
45	Lu Yan-ting (TPE)	13.200
46	Abdulaziz Al-Johani (KSA)	13.150
47	Rakesh Kumar Patra (IND)	13.000
48	Alok Ranjan (IND)	12.850
49	Nasser Al-Hamad (QAT)	12.800
50	Lum Wan Foong (MAS)	12.700
51	Huang Hsien (TPE)	12.500
52	Suriyen Chanduang (THA)	12.450
53	Mohammed Sharif (YEM)	12.400
54	Ng Kiu Chung (HKG)	12.400
55	Jasem Gazwi (KSA)	12.300
56	Rartchawat Kaewpanya (THA)	12.250
57	Ismail Shabi (KSA)	12.050
58	Younes Zeighami (IRI)	12.050
59	Tharindu Pathmaperuma (SRI)	11.750
60	Ali Al-Khwaher (KSA)	11.550
61	Mohamad Ibrahim Shami (LIB)	11.350
62	Shinoj Muliyil (IND)	11.300
63	Ajar Jangam (NEP)	11.000
64	Ali Saadi (IRQ)	10.750
65	Nadika Cooray (SRI)	10.650
66	Nirajan Kunwar (NEP)	8.900
67	Surah Bahadur Singh (NEP)	6.250
68	Chen Yibing (CHN)	0.000

=== Final ===
Rank	Athlete	Score
1st place, gold medalist(s)	Zhang Chenglong (CHN)	15.400
1st place, gold medalist(s)	Kim Soo-myun (KOR)	15.400
3rd place, bronze medalist(s)	Ashish Kumar (IND)	14.925
4	Feng Zhe (CHN)	14.900
5	Hisashi Mizutori (JPN)	14.825
6	Yoo Won-chul (KOR)	14.275
7	Otabek Masharipov (UZB)	14.000
8	Ryotaka Deguchi (JPN)	13.425
