= Gymnastics at the 2009 Summer Universiade =

Gymnastics at the XXV Summer Universiade
- Venue: Belgrade Fair, Hall 1
- Dates: July 2, 2009 – July 11, 2009

The Gymnastics competition in the 2009 Summer Universiade were held in Belgrade, Serbia.

== Combinated Medal table ==
Rank	Nation	Gold	Silver	Bronze	Total
1	Russia (RUS)	9	2	5	16
2	China (CHN)	3	6	4	13
3	Japan (JPN)	3	2	2	7
4	South Korea (KOR)	2	0	1	3
5	Great Britain (GBR)	2	0	0	2
6	North Korea (PRK)	1	3	3	7
7	Romania (ROU)	1	0	1	2
8	France (FRA)	1	0	0	1
8	Hungary (HUN)	1	0	0	1
10	Ukraine (UKR)	0	5	3	8
11	Belgium (BEL)	0	1	0	1
11	Israel (ISR)	0	1	0	1
11	Poland (POL)	0	1	0	1
14	Kazakhstan (KAZ)	0	0	2	2
15	Slovenia (SLO)	0	0	1	1
Totals (15 entries)		23	21	22	66

== Medal overview ==
=== Artistic gymnastics ===
==== Men's events ====
Event	Gold	Silver	Bronze
Team all-around	Japan (JPN); Yosuke Hoshi; Takuya Nakase; Takuya Niijima; Makoto Okiguchi; Kyoichi Watanabe	Russia (RUS); Aleksandr Balandin; Dmitry Barkalov; Alexander Demin; Emin Garibov; Vladimir Olennikov	China (CHN); Fu Min; Huang Yuguo; Liu Zhan Teng; Wang Heng; Yan Mingyong
Individual all-around	Yosuke Hoshi (JPN)	Wang Heng (CHN)	Kim Soo-Myun (KOR)
Floor	Kim Soo-Myun (KOR)	Ri Se Gwang (PRK)	Dmitry Barkalov (RUS)
Pommel horse	Krisztián Berki (HUN)	Donna-Donny Truyens (BEL)	Sašo Bertoncelj (SLO)
Rings	Aleksandr Balandin (RUS)	Yan Mingyong (CHN)	Ri Se Gwang (PRK)
Vault	Flavius Koczi (ROU)	Marek Lyszczarz (POL)	Huang Yuguo (CHN)
Parallel bars	Cyril Tommasone (FRA); Takuya Nakase (JPN)		Flavius Koczi (ROU)
Horizontal bar	Kim Ji-Hoon (KOR)	Takuya Nakase (JPN)	Kyoichi Watanabe (JPN)

==== Women's events ====
Event	Gold	Silver	Bronze
Team all-around	China (CHN); Cheng Fei; He Ning; Jiang Yuyuan; Liu Nanxi; Zhou Zhuoru	Russia (RUS); Olga Alexeeva; Maria Chibiskova; Tatiana Kazantseva; Svetlana Klyukina; Elena Zamolodchikova	Japan (JPN); Rie Tanaka; Sakiko Okabe; Serina Takeuti; Kana Takeya; Shoko Furukawa
Individual all-around	Jiang Yuyuan (CHN)	He Ning (CHN)	Kim Un-Hyang (PRK)
Vault	Hong Un Jong (PRK)	Cheng Fei (CHN)	Tatiana Kazantseva (RUS)
Floor	Beth Tweddle (GBR)	Jiang Yuyuan (CHN)	He Ning (CHN)
Uneven bars	Beth Tweddle (GBR)	Jiang Yuyuan (CHN)	Hong Un Jong (PRK)
Balance beam	Jiang Yuyuan (CHN)	He Ning (CHN)	Dariya Zgoba (UKR)

== Medal table ==
Rank	Nation	Gold	Silver	Bronze	Total
1	China (CHN)	3	6	4	13
2	Japan (JPN)	3	1	1	5
3	South Korea (KOR)	2	0	1	3
4	Great Britain (GBR)	2	0	0	2
5	North Korea (PRK)	1	2	3	6
6	Russia (RUS)	1	2	2	5
7	Romania (ROU)	1	0	1	2
8	France (FRA)	1	0	0	1
8	Hungary (HUN)	1	0	0	1
10	Belgium (BEL)	0	1	0	1
10	Poland (POL)	0	1	0	1
12	Slovenia (SLO)	0	0	1	1
12	Ukraine (UKR)	0	0	1	1
Totals (13 entries)		15	13	14	42

=== Rhythmic gymnastics ===
Event	Gold	Silver	Bronze
Individual All-Around	Yevgeniya Kanayeva (RUS)	Anna Bessonova (UKR)	Aliya Yussupova (KAZ)
Individual Ball	Yevgeniya Kanayeva (RUS)	Anna Bessonova (UKR)	Daria Kondakova (RUS)
Individual Hoop	Yevgeniya Kanayeva (RUS)	Irina Risenzon (ISR)	Aliya Yussupova (KAZ)
Individual Ribbon	Yevgeniya Kanayeva (RUS)	Anna Bessonova (UKR)	Daria Kondakova (RUS)
Individual Rope	Yevgeniya Kanayeva (RUS)	Anna Bessonova (UKR)	Daria Kondakova (RUS)
Group all-around	Russia (RUS); Yana Petunina; Anna Loman; Kristina Vaydurova; Yana Mishina; Daria Kuvshinova; Tatiana Ivanova	Japan (JPN); Megumi Shimada; Kaoru Nakamura; Ayaka Hikima; Yurino Osada; Seri Imatani; Mariko Sakazaki	Ukraine (UKR); Iryna Kovalchuk; Vira Perederii; Olena Dmytrash; Oksana Petulko; Olga Tsolga; Vita Zubchenko
Group 5 Hoops	Russia (RUS); Yana Petunina; Anna Loman; Kristina Vaydurova; Yana Mishina; Daria Kuvshinova; Tatiana Ivanova	North Korea (PRK); Mun Song Mi; Choe Ryon; Ri Jin Ju; Kim Song Sun; Ri Un A Kang Un Byol	Ukraine (UKR); Iryna Kovalchuk; Vira Perederii; Olena Dmytrash; Oksana Petulko; Olga Tsolga; Vita Zubchenko
Group 3 Ribbons + 2 Ropes	Russia (RUS); Yana Petunina; Anna Loman; Kristina Vaydurova; Yana Mishina; Daria Kuvshinova; Tatiana Ivanova	Ukraine (UKR); Iryna Kovalchuk; Vira Perederii; Olena Dmytrash; Oksana Petulko; Olga Tsolga; Vita Zubchenko	Japan (JPN); Megumi Shimada; Kaoru Nakamura; Ayaka Hikima; Yurino Osada; Seri Imatani; Mariko Sakazaki

== Medal table ==
Rank	Nation	Gold	Silver	Bronze	Total
1	Russia (RUS)	8	0	3	11
2	Ukraine (UKR)	0	5	2	7
3	Japan (JPN)	0	1	1	2
4	Israel (ISR)	0	1	0	1
4	North Korea (PRK)	0	1	0	1
6	Kazakhstan (KAZ)	0	0	2	2
Totals (6 entries)		8	8	8	24
