= Gymnastics at the 2007 Summer Universiade =

Gymnastics at the XXIV Summer Universiade
- Venue: IMPACT Arena Muang Thong Thani
- Dates: August 9, 2007 – August 18, 2007

The Gymnastics competition in the 2007 Summer Universiade were held in Bangkok, Thailand.

== Combinated Medal table ==
Rank	Nation	Gold	Silver	Bronze	Total
1	Ukraine (UKR)	10	3	4	17
2	Japan (JPN)	5	2	4	11
3	China (CHN)	4	7	3	14
4	Russia (RUS)	3	6	7	16
5	Slovenia (SLO)	1	0	0	1
6	Hungary (HUN)	0	2	0	2
7	Portugal (POR)	0	1	0	1
8	Romania (ROU)	0	0	2	2
9	Kazakhstan (KAZ)	0	0	1	1
9	South Korea (KOR)	0	0	1	1
9	United States (USA)	0	0	1	1
Totals (11 entries)		23	21	23	67

== Artistic gymnastics ==
=== Men's events ===
Event	Gold	Silver	Bronze
Individual all-around	Hisashi Mizutori; Japan	Guo Weiyang; China	Koki Sakamoto; Japan
Team all-around	Japan (JPN); Hisashi Mizutori; Koki Sakamoto; Kazuhito Tanaka; Kōhei Uchimura; Kazuya Ueda	China (CHN); Guo Weiyang; Chen Lei; Tong Yingjie; Wang Heng	Ukraine (UKR); Dmytro Gyrenko; Andriy Isayev; Anton Novosolov; Maksym Ovchinnikov; Oleksandr Vorobiov
Rings	Oleksandr Vorobiov; Ukraine	Marcell Hetrovics; Hungary	Go Jun-woong; South Korea
Bar	Hisashi Mizutori; Japan	Guo Weiyang; China	Timur Kuzmin; Russia
Parallel bar	Guo Weiyang; China; Kazuya Ueda; Japan		Cosmin Popescu; Romania
Vault	Andriy Isayev; Ukraine	Luís Araújo; Portugal	Kōhei Uchimura; Japan
Floor	Kōhei Uchimura; Japan	Hisashi Mizutori; Japan	Dmitry Barkalov; Russia
Pommel horse	Sašo Bertoncelj; Slovenia	Vid Hidvégi; Hungary	Derek Helsby; United States

=== Women's events ===
Event	Gold	Silver	Bronze
Individual all-around	Zhou Zhuoru; China	Olga Shcherbatykh; Ukraine	Fan Ye; China
Team all-around	China (CHN); Deng Ying; Fan Ye; Lu Huang; Zhang Nan; Zhou Zhuoru	Ukraine (UKR); Maryna Kostiuchenko; Maryna Proskurina; Dariya Zgoba; Alina Kozich; Olga Shcherbatykh	Russia (RUS); Maria Chibiskova; Alena Polyan; Alena Zmev; Leysira Gabdrakhmanova; Elena Zamolodchikova
Uneven bars	Dariya Zgoba; Ukraine	Zhou Zhuoru; China	Fan Ye; China
Vault	Olga Shcherbatykh; Ukraine	Deng Ying; China	Leysira Gabdrakhmanova; Russia
Floor	Alena Polyan; Russia	Fan Ye; China	Elena Zamolodchikova; Russia
Balance beam	Fan Ye; China	Zhou Zhuoru; China	Florica Leonida; Romania

== Medal table ==
Rank	Nation	Gold	Silver	Bronze	Total
1	Japan (JPN)	5	1	2	8
2	China (CHN)	4	7	2	13
3	Ukraine (UKR)	4	2	1	7
4	Russia (RUS)	1	0	5	6
5	Slovenia (SLO)	1	0	0	1
6	Hungary (HUN)	0	2	0	2
7	Portugal (POR)	0	1	0	1
8	Romania (ROU)	0	0	2	2
9	South Korea (KOR)	0	0	1	1
9	United States (USA)	0	0	1	1
Totals (10 entries)		15	13	14	42

== Rhythmic gymnastics ==
Event	Gold	Silver	Bronze
Individual All-Around	Anna Bessonova (UKR)	Olga Kapranova (RUS)	Vera Sessina (RUS)
Individual Rope	Anna Bessonova (UKR)	Vera Sessina (RUS)	Natalia Godunko (UKR)
Individual Hoop	Anna Bessonova (UKR)	Olga Kapranova (RUS)	Inna Zhukova (BLR)
Individual Ribbon	Anna Bessonova (UKR)	Olga Kapranova (RUS)	Vera Sessina (RUS)
Individual Clubs	Anna Bessonova (UKR)	Vera Sessina (RUS)	Aliya Yussupova (KAZ)
Group all-around	Russia (RUS)	Ukraine (UKR); Nadya Vasina; Vita Zubchenko; Iryna Kovalchuk; Inga Kozhokhina; Polina Kondaurova; Olha Skuradova	Japan (JPN)
Group 3 hoops and 2 clubs	Russia (RUS)	Japan (JPN)	China (CHN)
Group 5 ropes	Ukraine (UKR); Nadya Vasina; Vita Zubchenko; Iryna Kovalchuk; Inga Kozhokhina; Polina Kondaurova; Olha Skuradova	Russia (RUS)	Japan (JPN)

== Medal table ==
Rank	Nation	Gold	Silver	Bronze	Total
1	Ukraine (UKR)	6	1	1	8
2	Russia (RUS)	2	6	2	10
3	Japan (JPN)	0	1	2	3
4	Belarus (BLR)	0	0	1	1
4	China (CHN)	0	0	1	1
4	Kazakhstan (KAZ)	0	0	1	1
Totals (6 entries)		8	8	8	24

== External sources ==
- Gymnastics World Stars at the UNIVERSIADE 2007 - Total Triumph of Anna BESSONOVA
- 24th Universiade Bangkok 2007 Artistic Gymnastics Women Bangkok (THA) 2007 August 9-12 Finals Women
