= Nadiia Vasina =

Ukrainian gymnast

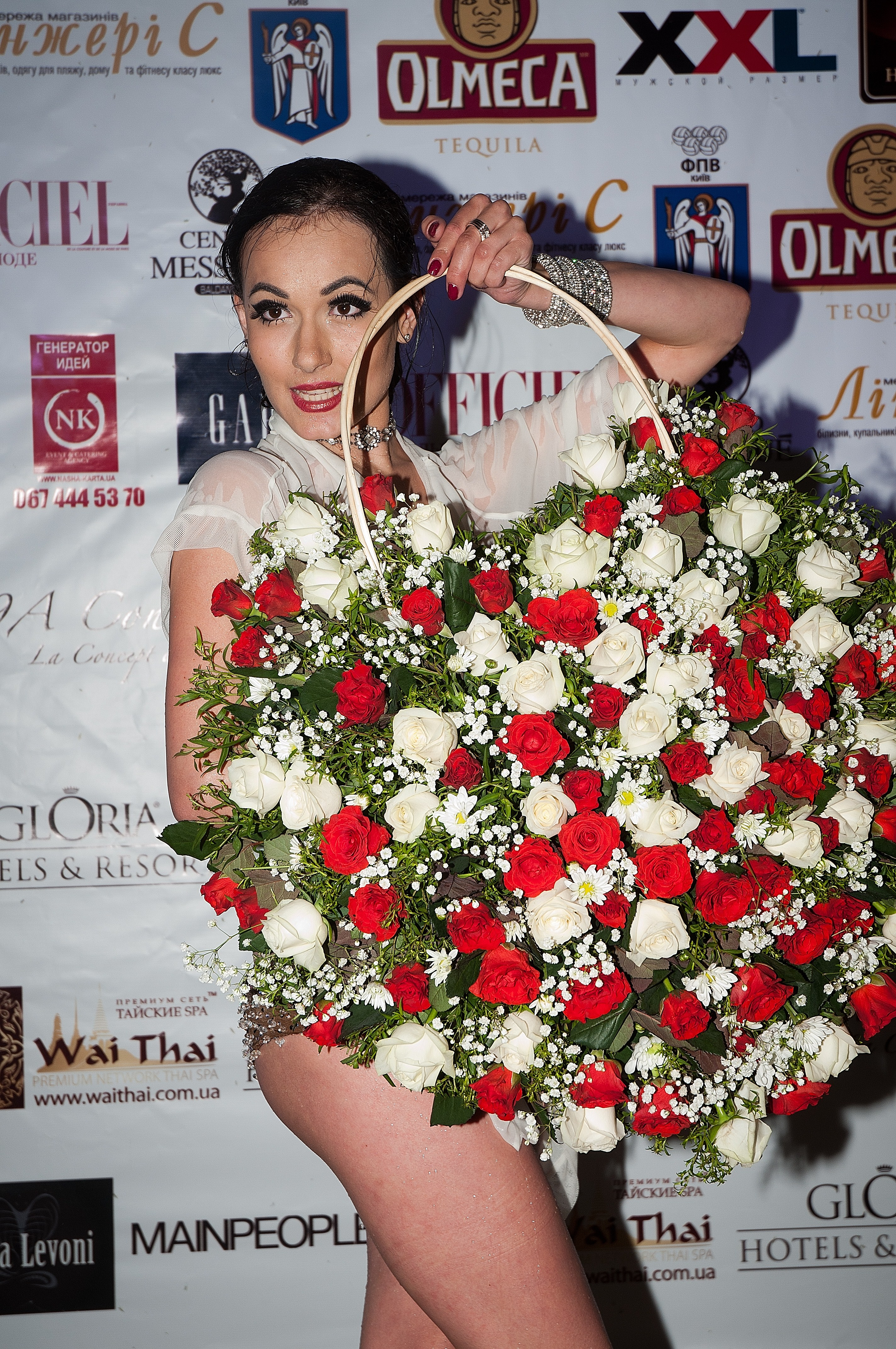
- Nadiia Vasina in 2012

Personal information
- Full name: Nadiia Andriivna Vasina
- Born: 11 July 1989 (age 37) Kiev, Ukrainian SSR, Soviet Union

Gymnastics career
- Discipline: Women's artistic gymnastics
- Country represented: Ukraine
Medal record
Women's gymnastics
Representing Ukraine
Gymnasiade
Gold medal – first place	2006 Athens/Thessaloniki	Team
Summer Universiade
Gold medal – first place	2007 Bangkok	5 Ropes
Silver medal – second place	2007 Bangkok	Group All-around

Nadiia Andriivna Vasina (born July 11, 1989, Kyiv) is a Ukrainian rhythmic gymnast, Master of Sports of International Class (MSMK), original genre performer, radio presenter, and volunteer. She created Hotel Freedom, Ukraine's first dinner-show, officially recorded in the Book of Records of Ukraine, and runs the volunteer initiative Hope for Good ("Надія на добро").

== Family and early background ==
Nadiia was born into a family combining athletic and creative backgrounds. Her mother was a competitive track and field athlete from Azerbaijan. Her father worked as a DJ and concert organizer, and was one of the founders of Ukraine's radio industry, later heading several FM radio stations. Her parents combined discipline and a competitive spirit on one side with creativity and radio on the other, and instilled both in their daughter.

== Athletic career (1994–2008) ==
From age three, Vasina engaged in dance, swimming, and figure skating. In 1994, at age five, she joined the Terpsikhora rhythmic gymnastics club under coach Halyna Doroshenko, marking the beginning of her competitive path. In 1997, she transferred to the school of Nina Vitrychenko, and in 2000, at age 11, moved to the Deriugina school — the training base of the Ukrainian national team.

Nadiia Vasina performing with ribbon in rhythmic gymnastics

- 2002: At age 12, selected by Albina and Iryna Deriugina for the Ukrainian National Rhythmic Gymnastics Team. As part of the junior national team, reached the final of the European Championship (five-hoop exercise) at age 13.
- 2003: Earned the title Master of Sports of Ukraine (age 13).
- 2004: Earned the title Master of Sports of International Class (MSMK) (age 14).
- 2005: Silver and bronze medalist at the FIG World Cup stage in Nizhny Novgorod (2005–2006 FIG World Cup series).
- 2006: Gold medalist at the 13th World Gymnasiade (Athens, Greece), group exercises.
- 2007: Gold medalist at the 24th Summer Universiade (Bangkok, Thailand). Awarded the State Medal "For Labor and Achievement" (Presidential Decree No. 826/2007).

== Performing and creative career ==
- 2008–2009: Began collaborating with director Anatolii Zalevskyi (Rizoma Theatre), who helped guide her transition from sport to performing arts. Collaborated with Cirque du Soleil.
- 2010–2011: Developed her original Passion Show (directed by Viktor Voitko, produced by Oleg Herman), a three-part illusion-gymnastic performance built around the themes of passion, money, and fire. The show premiered on October 26, 2011, at Freedom Hall, Kyiv.
- 2012: Premiered Ukraine's first burlesque show, Nadiia Vasina's Intimate Room, at Olmeca Beach in Kyiv, before more than 1,000 spectators. On March 16, 2012, performed her solo act Delicate on France 2's Le Plus Grand Cabaret du Monde, hosted by Patrick Sébastien. Named to "The Most Beautiful Woman of Ukraine" list by a Ukrainian magazine. Began providing coaching support to gymnasts in Chicago.
- 2013: Performed her act Rose at the 21st International Circus Festival of Massy (France), broadcast on Gulli TV (September 11, 2013).

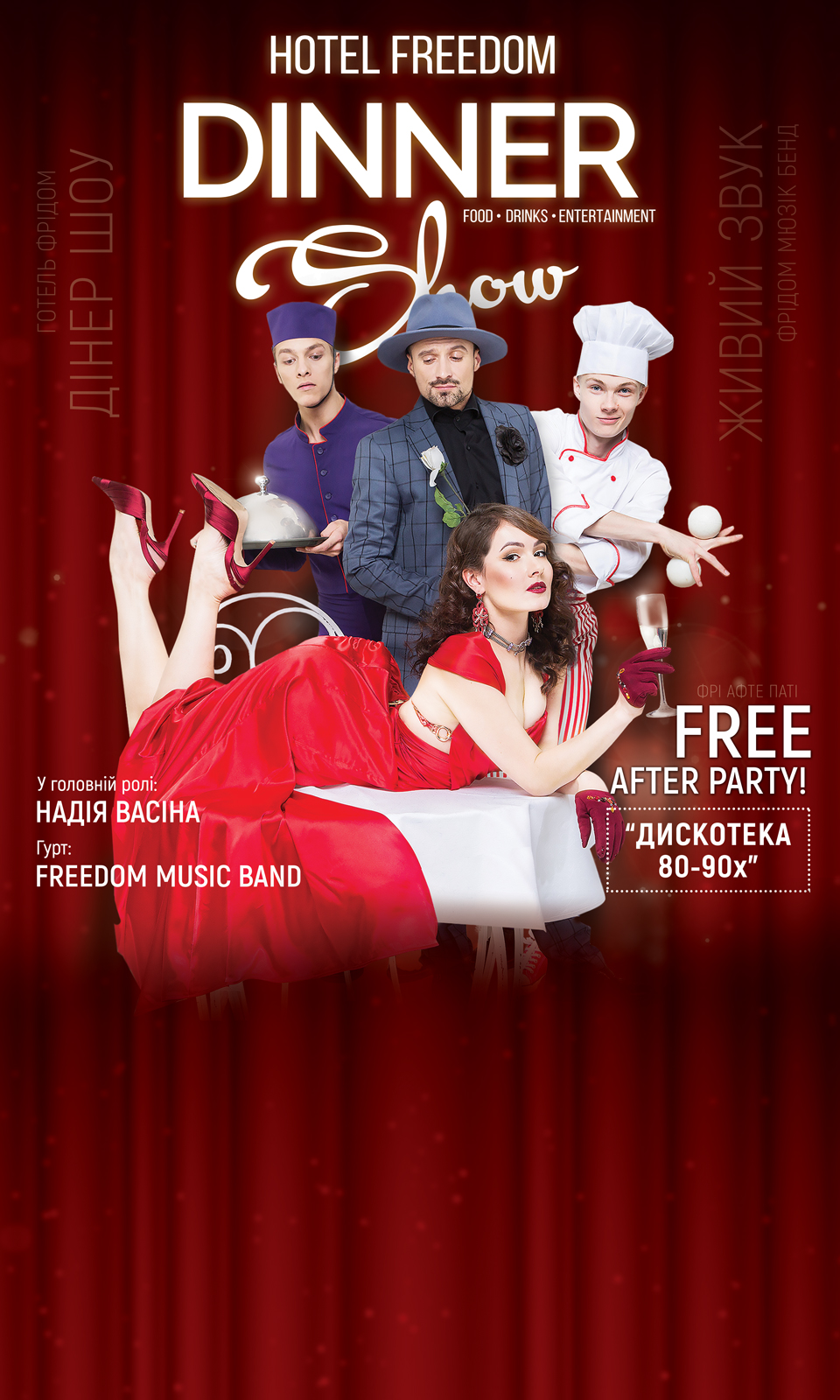
Promotional poster for Hotel Freedom Dinner Show, Kyiv, featuring Nadiia Vasina in the lead role and the Freedom Music Band.

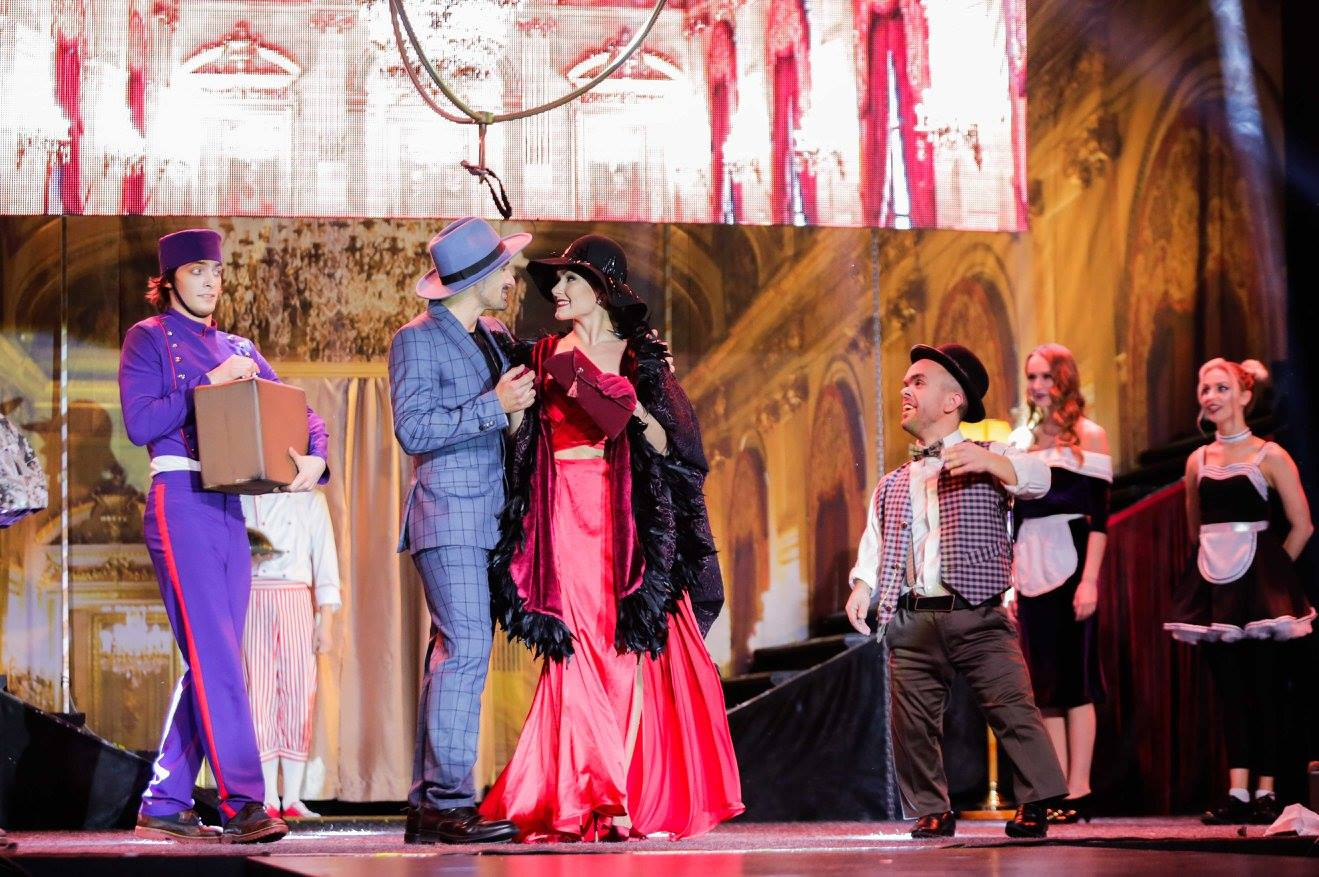
Nadiia Vasina (center) performing in the Hotel Freedom dinner show, which she created together with Kvartal Concert, at Freedom Event Hall, Kyiv.

- 2014: Principal soloist in the US equestrian production Sable Theatre (March–November), combining trick riding with gymnastic and dance performance.
- 2015: Successfully passed the selection process for America's Got Talent, but was ultimately unable to appear on the show as her US work visa was not granted in time.
- 2016: Lead performer in the Chinese Bridge television show (Hunan TV, China), reaching an audience of approximately 1.5 billion viewers.
- 2016–2018: Created and starred in Hotel Freedom, a dinner-show co-produced with Kvartal Concert at Freedom Event Hall, Kyiv.* 2017–2018: Co-created the aquatic-gymnastic project "50 for Both" ("50 на двох") with Olympic swimming champion Oleg Lisogor.
- 2019–2020: Collaborated with French photographer Dani Olivier for exhibitions in Paris.

== Academic and coaching career ==
- Kyiv National University of Culture and Arts (KNUCA), 2008–2012: Graduated with honors, earning a Master's degree in Choreography.

Nadiia Vasina with her students at Kyiv National University of Culture and Arts

- KNUCA, 2018–present: Returned to the university as an instructor, receiving the title "Star Lecturer," and conducts monthly stretching workshops for students of the Faculty of Choreographic Art.
- Esports Faculty (NUUPESU), 2019–2022: Co-founded and designed physical training curricula for Ukraine's first university esports department.

Nadiia Vasina with Mykhailo Poplavskyi

- Olena Vitrychenko's school, Chicago (USA), 2012: Provided coaching support to gymnasts.
- Indigo Education, 2017 – February 2022: Founder, director, and head coach of the Indigo Education International Sports and Art Center for children. Activities ceased with the onset of the full-scale invasion.
- Stefania sports center, 2022–2025: Head coach.
- Provided flexibility training assistance to Greco-Roman wrestlers.

== Volunteering and public activity ==
- 2013 Maidan (Chicago): While in the United States, took part in a local solidarity rally in support of the Maidan movement in Chicago.
- 2014 Maidan (Kyiv): Returned to Kyiv and took part in civil rallies supporting the Maidan movement.
- 2014: American music producer Mark Carman and singer Jason Crabb dedicated the song Tears for Kyiv to Ukraine and to Vasina, whom they met during her tour in the United States. Carman publicly gifted her an automobile wrapped in the Ukrainian flag.
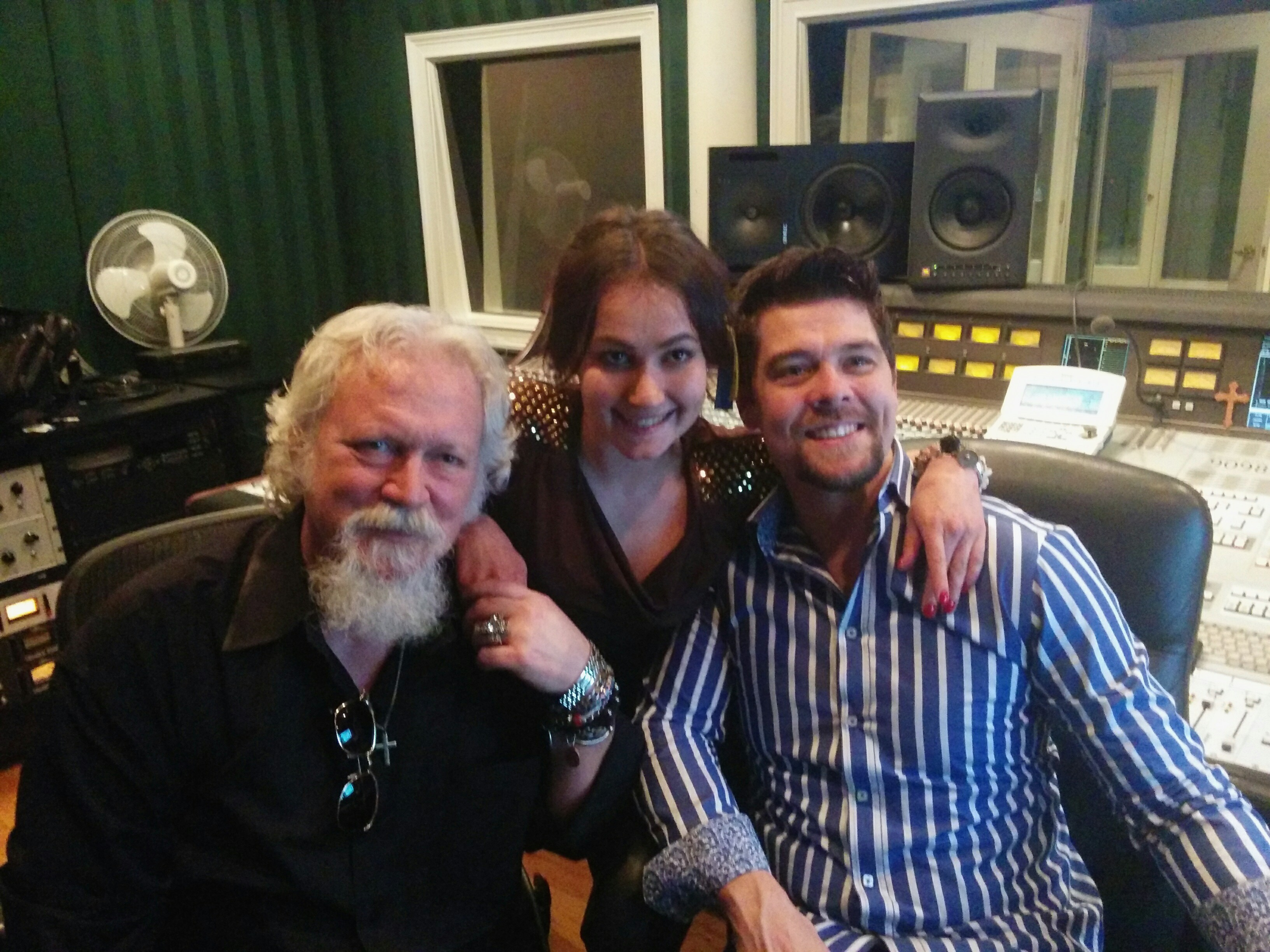
  Nadiia Vasina with American music producer Mark Carman (left) and country singer Jason Crabb (right) in a recording studio in Nashville, Tennessee, 2014.
- Since 2014: Regularly travels to the Donetsk and Luhansk regions to provide aid to Ukrainian military units, including the 95th, 93rd, 72nd, 25th, and 503rd brigades, the Special Operations Forces (SOF), and the Security Service of Ukraine (SBU).
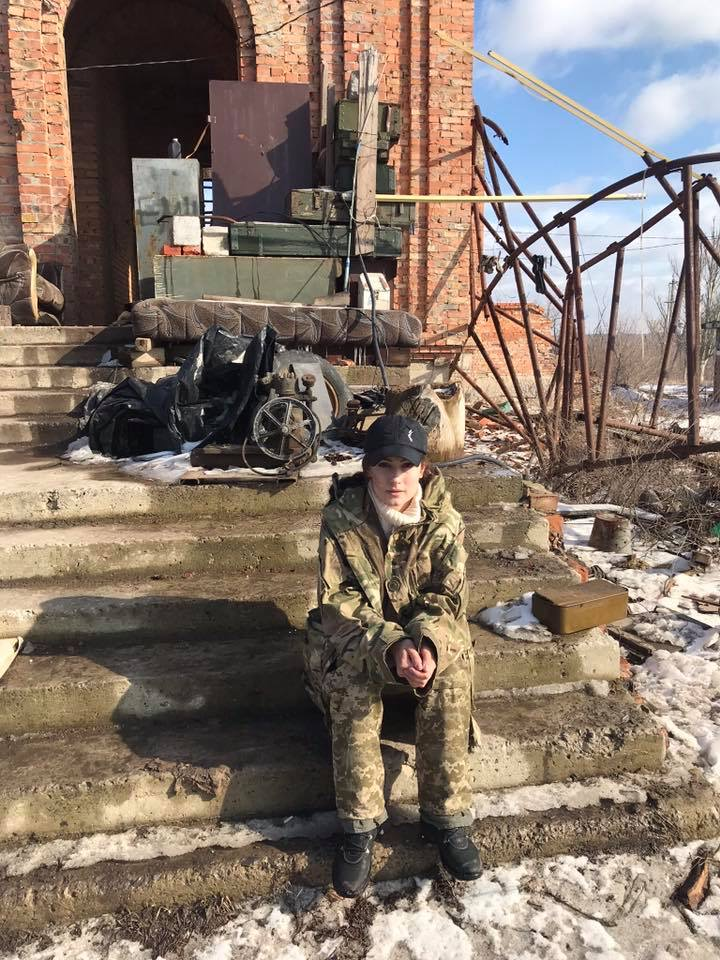
  Nadiia Vasina in the frontline town of Pisky, Donetsk Oblast, during a visit to support Ukrainian military units, 2017.
- Civilian aid: Supported a kindergarten in Avdiivka, assisted the Prolisky charitable foundation, and helped transport families evacuating from the Donbas region. Also cares for abandoned animals in conflict-affected areas.
- "Hope for Good" ("Надія на добро"), founded 2022: A personal volunteer initiative through which Vasina organizes and delivers humanitarian and military aid.
- 2023–2024: Partnered with NUUPESU Rector Yevheniy Imas to create a tuition-free university education program for Ukrainian military veterans.
- International Speaker: Keynote speaker at the 9th World Congress Mentales Stärken (Würzburg, 2–5 November 2023), presenting on psychological resilience and rehabilitation through sport.

== Media career ==
- Radio Kyiv, 2018–2020: Hosted the sports-and-psychology radio project "Kryla" ("Wings").
- Radio Kyiv, 2020–present: Creator and host of the weekly radio show #NADYAVASINASHOW, conducting interviews with Ukrainian defenders and veterans.Guests on her show have included Vasyl Virastyuk, winner of the 2004 World's Strongest Man competition.
  Nadiia Vasina with Ukrainian strongman Vasyl Virastyuk, winner of the 2004 World's Strongest Man competition, at Radio Kyiv 98FM studio.
- UK Media (Bolton FM), since 2023: Occasional guest on 96.5 Bolton FM's Friday morning show, hosted by Dr. Andrew Dickson MBE, appearing on-air during visits to the United Kingdom.
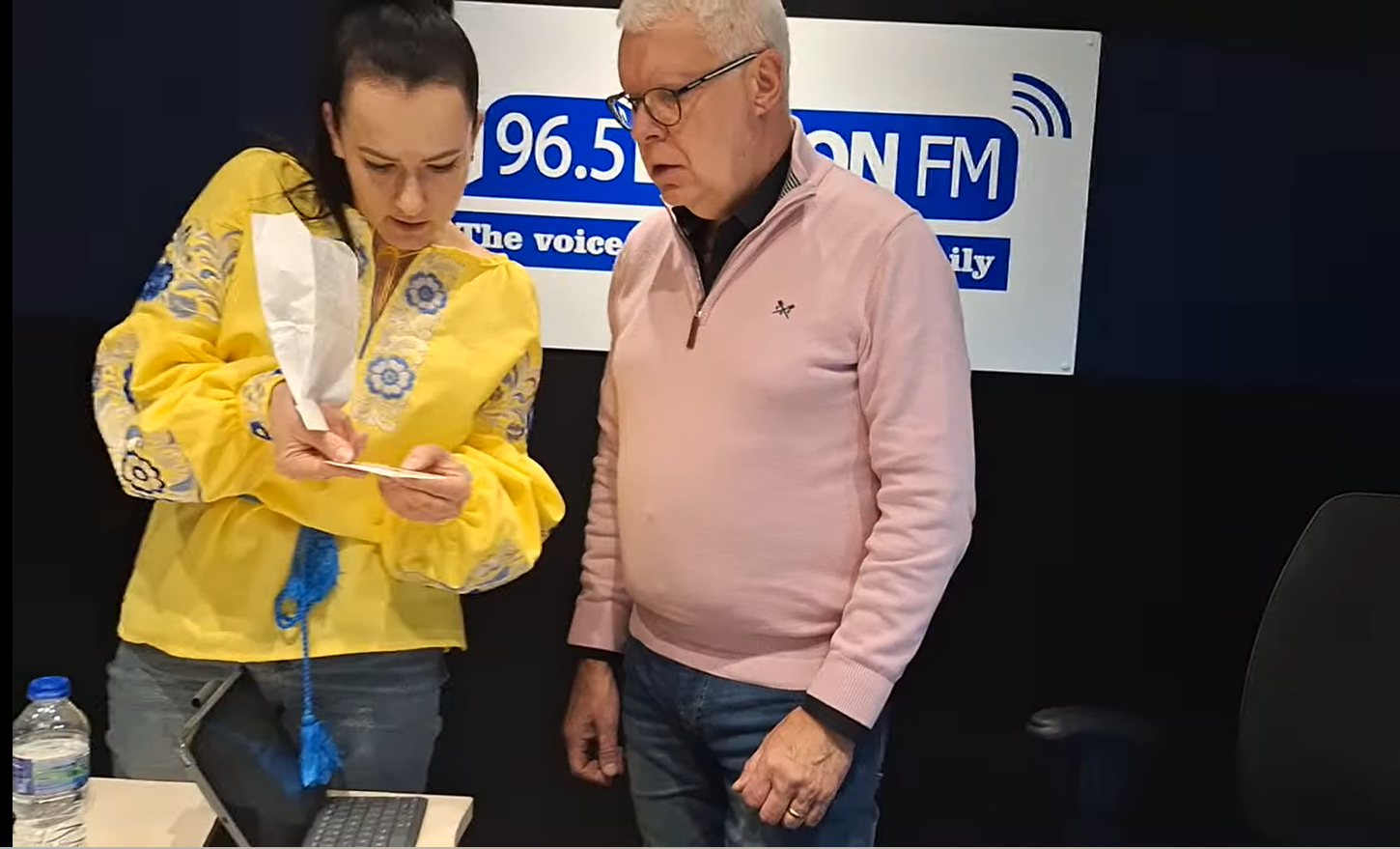
  Nadiia Vasina during an appearance on 96.5 Bolton FM's Friday morning show, United Kingdom, March 2026.
- US Media (Newsradio 600 KOGO), 2022–present: International reporter and co-presenter on Mark Larson's show in San Diego, California.
- Television, 2022–2023: On-air presenter and field reporter for TV Kyiv.

== Awards and honors ==
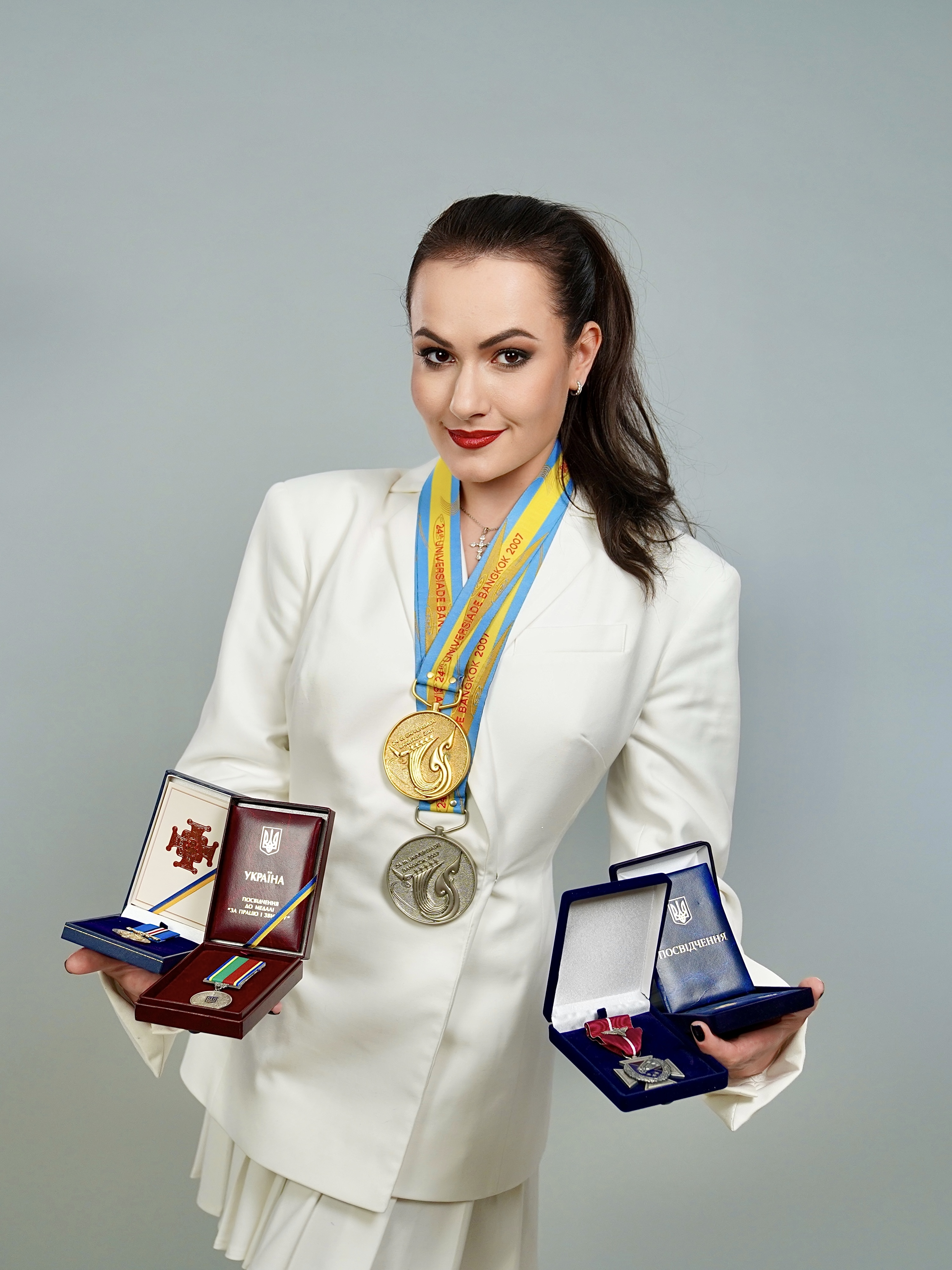
Nadiia Vasina at an award ceremony

- Master of Sports of Ukraine (2003)
- Master of Sports of International Class (MSMK) (2004)
- Medal "For Labor and Achievement" — Decree of the President of Ukraine No. 826/2007, awarded for achievements at the 2007 Summer Universiade
- "The Most Beautiful Woman of Ukraine" — The Most Beautiful Woman of Ukraine. National Property magazine (2012 and 2016)
- "18 Outstanding Ukrainian Women of Modernity" — DEPO.ua (2018)
