= Vita Zubchenko =

Ukrainian rhythmic gymnast (born 1989)

- Born: 4 March 1989 (age 37) Bila Tserkva, Kyiv Oblast, Ukrainian SSR

Gymnastics career
- Discipline: Rhythmic gymnastics
- Country represented: Ukraine; (2005–2009 (?))
Medal record
Representing Ukraine
Group rhythmic gymnastics
Summer Universiade
Gold medal – first place	2007 Bangkok	5 Ropes
Silver medal – second place	2007 Bangkok	Group All-around
Silver medal – second place	2009 Belgrade	3 Ribbons + 2 Ropes
Bronze medal – third place	2009 Belgrade	Group All-around
Bronze medal – third place	2009 Belgrade	5 Hoops

Vita Zubchenko (Ukrainian: Віта Зубченко, born 4 March 1989) is a Ukrainian group rhythmic gymnast. She represents her nation at international competitions.

She participated at the 2008 Summer Olympics in Beijing. She also competed at world championships, including at the 2005, 2007 and 2009 World Rhythmic Gymnastics Championships.
