= Yuki Yoshimura =

Japanese artistic gymnast

- Born: September 9, 1981 (age 44)

Gymnastics career
- Discipline: Men's artistic gymnastics
- Country represented: Japan
Medal record
Asian Games
| Silver medal – second place | 2006 Doha | Team |

Yuki Yoshimura (芳村裕生, Yuki Yoshimura; born September 9, 1981) is a Japanese gymnast. Yoshimura was part of the Japanese team that won the silver medal in the team event at the 2006 Asian Games.
