= Vivek Mishra =

Indian gymnast

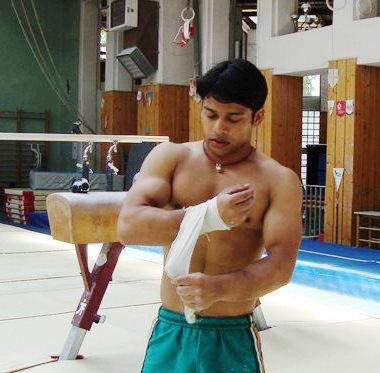

Personal information
- Full name: Vivek Mishra
- Born: 8 September 1986 (age 39) Allahabad

Gymnastics career
- Country represented: India

Vivek Mishra (born 8 September 1986) is an Indian gymnast from Allahabad, Uttar Pradesh. He has represented India in such international competitions as the 2006 Commonwealth Games and the 2006 Asian Games. He was one of five gymnasts from Allahabad named to the gymnastics team for the 2010 Commonwealth Games but was unable to compete because of a shin bone fracture.

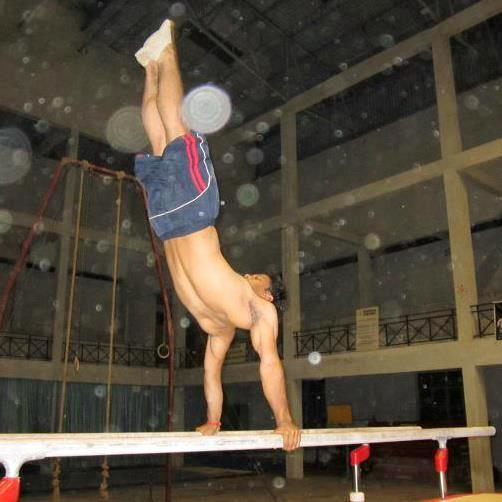
Vivek Mishra practicing on Parallel Bars.

Mishra received a 2008-09 Laxman award for his athletic achievements at the national and international level. Award winners receive a bronze statue, a scroll, and a cash award of 50,000 rupees.
