= Kim Soo-myun =

South Korean artistic gymnast

- 김수면
- Alternative name: Kim Su-myeon
- Born: 4 November 1986 (age 39) Pohang, South Korea
- Height: 1.65 m (5 ft 5 in)

Gymnastics career
- Discipline: Men's artistic gymnastics
- Country represented: South Korea
- Club: Pohang Iron and Steel Company
Medal record
Men's artistic gymnastics
Representing South Korea
Asian Games
Gold medal – first place	2006 Doha	Pommel horse
Gold medal – first place	2010 Guangzhou	Floor
Bronze medal – third place	2006 Doha	Team
Bronze medal – third place	2006 Doha	Floor
Bronze medal – third place	2010 Guangzhou	Team
Universiade
Gold medal – first place	2009 Belgrade	Floor
Bronze medal – third place	2009 Belgrade	All-around

Korean name
- Hangul: 김수면
- RR: Gim Sumyeon
- MR: Kim Sumyŏn

Kim Soo-myun (born 4 November 1986, Pohang) is a South Korean gymnast. Kim was part of the South Korean team that won the bronze medal in the team event at the 2006 Asian Games, as well as the South Korean 2007 World Championships team and 2008 and 2012 Olympic teams. His best event is floor exercise.

== Education ==
- Korea National Sport University
