= Olena Dmytrash =

Ukrainian rhythmic gymnast (born 1991)

- Full name: Olena Mykolayivna Dmytrash
- Born: 1 December 1991 (age 34) Bila Tserkva, Kyiv Oblast, Ukraine
- Height: 173 cm (5 ft 8 in)

Gymnastics career
- Discipline: Rhythmic gymnastics
- Country represented: Ukraine (2008-2016)
- Retired: yes
Medal record
Representing Ukraine
Group rhythmic gymnastics
World Championships
Bronze medal – third place	2013 Kyiv	10 Clubs
European Games
Silver medal – second place	2015 Baku	5 Ribbons
Bronze medal – third place	2015 Baku	6 Clubs and 2 Hoops
World Cup Final
Bronze medal – third place	2008 Benidorm	3 hoops/ 4 clubs
Bronze medal – third place	2008 Benidorm	5 ropes
Summer Universiade
Gold medal – first place	2015 Gwangju	6 Clubs / 2 Hoops
Silver medal – second place	2015 Gwangju	Group All-around
Silver medal – second place	2015 Gwangju	5 Ribbons
Silver medal – second place	2013 Kazan	Group All-around
Silver medal – second place	2009 Belgrade	3 Ribbons + 2 Ropes
Bronze medal – third place	2009 Belgrade	Group All-around
Bronze medal – third place	2009 Belgrade	5 Hoops
Bronze medal – third place	2013 Kazan	10 Clubs
Bronze medal – third place	2013 Kazan	2 Ribbons + 3 Balls

Olena Mykolayivna Dmytrash (Ukrainian: Олена Миколаївна Дмитраш; born 1 December 1991) is a Ukrainian group rhythmic gymnast. She is the 2013 World bronze medalist in 10 clubs and 2015 Universiade champion in 6 clubs + 2 hoops.

== Career ==
Dmytrash represents her nation at international competitions. She participated at the 2008 Summer Olympics, 2012 Summer Olympics and 2016 Summer Olympics. She is the Ukrainian rhythmic gymnast with most appearances at the Olympic stage as well one of the few rhythmic gymnasts of the world that has attended and reached the Olympic finals. She also competed at world championships, including at the 2007, 2009, 2010, 2011, 2013, 2014 and 2015 World Championships.

At the 2015 European Games in Baku, Dmytrash won a silver medal in the group ribbons event and a bronze medal in the group clubs and hoops event.
