= Kim Ji-hoon (gymnast) =

South Korean artistic gymnast

- 김지훈
- Alternative name: Kim Ji-hun
- Born: 9 August 1984 (age 42) Seoul, South Korea
- Height: 1.73 m (5 ft 8 in)

Gymnastics career
- Discipline: Men's artistic gymnastics
- Country represented: South Korea
- Club: Seoul City Hall
Medal record
Men's artistic gymnastics
Representing South Korea
Asian Games
Bronze medal – third place	2006 Doha	Team
Bronze medal – third place	2006 Doha	Horizontal Bar
Bronze medal – third place	2010 Guangzhou	Team

Korean name
- Hangul: 김지훈
- RR: Gim Jihun
- MR: Kim Chihun

Kim Ji-hoon (born 9 August 1984) is a South Korean gymnast. Kim was part of the South Korean team that won the bronze medal in the team event at the 2006 Asian Games. He also competed at the 2008 Summer Olympics and the 2012 Summer Olympics.

== Education ==
- Korea National Sport University
