= 2007 Summer Universiade =

Multi-sport event in Bangkok, Thailand

XXIV Summer Universiade กีฬามหาวิทยาลัยโลกฤดูร้อน ครั้งที่ 24
- Slogan: "All Become One"
- Host city: Bangkok, Thailand
- Nations: 152
- Athletes: 6,093
- Events: 236 in 15 sports
- Opening: August 8, 2007
- Closing: August 18, 2007
- Opened by: Crown Prince Maha Vajiralongkorn
- Athlete's Oath: Boonsak Ponsana (Badminton)
- Judge's Oath: Visuit Jundung
- Torch lighter: HRH Princess Sirivannavari Nariratana
- Main venue: Rajamangala National Stradium
- Website: bangkok2007.com (archived)

The 2007 Summer Universiade officially known as the XXIV Summer Universiade and commonly known as Bangkok Universiade, was an international multi-sport for university athletes that took place from 8 to 18 August 2007 in Bangkok, Thailand, with preliminary events in some sports beginning on 7 August. Bangkok also hosted the Asian Games in 1966, 1970, 1978 and 1998.

== Bidding process ==
In August 2003, FISU officially confirmed five candidate cities:

- Bangkok, Thailand
- Kaohsiung, Chinese Taipei
- Monterrey, Mexico
- Poznań, Poland
- Saskatoon, Canada

Bangkok, Saskatoon, Poznań, Kaohsiung and Monterrey were the five candidate cities. However, Saskatoon Bid was withdrawn.

== Visual Identity ==
=== Mascot ===
The official mascot of the 2007 Summer Universiade is a rabbit named Mighty Mai-Tri. The name of this mascot suggests themes of power and friendship but also corresponds to the Year of the Rabbit, which is the lunar year of King Bhumibol's birth. The rabbit welcomes athletes of all nations. His appearance expresses humility through a smile, color, and mannerism.

=== Slogan ===
The slogan for the 24th Summer Universiade is, "All Become One", suggesting the unity of people of all races and religions from 150 countries.

=== Logo ===
The logo itself consists of five line colors arranged in a U shape, which is derived from the word Universiade and is comparable to the lines of experience transmission. The exchange of knowledge and culture between representatives and athletes from universities from five continents around the world all in one. Connected into a golden yellow bird patterned symbol, which is the identity of the Thai nation.

== Venues ==
Provinces	Venues	Stadiums	Sports
Bangkok	Kasetsart University	Insee Chantarasatit Stadium	Football
Bangkok	Ramkhamhaeng University	Ramkhamhaeng University Stadium	Football
Bangkok	Royal Thai Army	Thai Army Sports Stadium	Football
Bangkok	Sports Authority of Thailand	Clay Target Range	Shooting
Bangkok	Sports Authority of Thailand	Indoor Stadium Huamark	Volleyball
Bangkok	Sports Authority of Thailand	Rajamangala Stadium	Football
Bangkok	Sports Authority of Thailand	Shooting Range	Shooting
Bangkok	Thailand National Stadium	Supachalasai Stadium	Football
Bangkok	Thailand National Stadium	Nimibutr Stadium	Basketball
Bangkok	Thai-Japanese Stadium	Gymnasium 1	Basketball
Bangkok	Thai-Japanese Stadium	Gymnasium 2	Volleyball
Nakhon Nayok	Srinakharinwirot University	Aquatic Stadium	Water Polo
Nakhon Nayok	Srinakharinwirot University	Gymnasium 1	Basketball
Nakhon Nayok	Srinakharinwirot University	Srinakharinwirot University Stadium	Football
Nakhon Nayok	Srinakharinwirot University	Softball Stadium	Softball
Nakhon Nayok	Ongkharak	Watermill Golf & Gardens	Golf
Nonthaburi	IMPACT Arena Muang Thong Thani	Arena Hall	Artistic Gymnastics
Nonthaburi	IMPACT Arena Muang Thong Thani	Arena Hall	Rhythmic Gymnastics
Nonthaburi	IMPACT Arena Muang Thong Thani	Hall 2	Volleyball
Nonthaburi	IMPACT Arena Muang Thong Thani	Hall 5−6	Table Tennis
Nonthaburi	IMPACT Arena Muang Thong Thani	Hall 7−8	Fencing
Nonthaburi	Lawn Tennis Association of Thailand	The National Tennis Development Center	Tennis
Pathum Thani	Bangkok University	Bangkok University Stadium	Football
Pathum Thani	Pathum Thani	Chiang Rak Noi−Chiang Rak Yai Road	Athletics (Marathon)
Pathum Thani	Rajamangala University of Technology Thanyaburi	RMUTT Satadium	Football
Pathum Thani	Thammasat University	Aquatic Center	Diving
Pathum Thani	Thammasat University	Gymnasium 1−Hall 1	Basketball
Pathum Thani	Thammasat University	Gymnasium 1−Hall 3	Volleyball
Pathum Thani	Thammasat University	Gymnasium 2	Badminton
Pathum Thani	Thammasat University	Gymnasium 4	Judo
Pathum Thani	Thammasat University	Gymnasium 6	Taekwondo
Pathum Thani	Thammasat University	Thammasat Stadium	Athletics
Pathum Thani	Thammasat University	Softball Field	Softball
Pathum Thani	Thammasat University	Swimming Pool	Swimming
Phra Nakhon Si Ayutthaya	Phra Nakhon Si Ayutthaya	Ayutthaya Historical Park	Athletics (Walk)
Samut Prakan	Assumption University	John Paul II Sports Center	Volleyball

== Calendar ==
●	Opening Ceremony	●	Competitions	●	Finals	●	Closing Ceremony

August	07	08	09	10	11	12	13	14	15	16	17	18	Total
Ceremonies		●										●	
Aquatics – Diving									1	1	4	6	12
Aquatics – Swimming			6	6	7	7	6	8					40
Aquatics – Water polo											1		1
Athletics			4	7	8	8	9	10					46
Badminton					1				5				6
Basketball											1	1	2
Fencing					2	2	2	2	2	2			12
Football											2		2
Golf											4		4
Gymnastics – Artistic			1	1	2	10							14
Gymnastics – Rhythmic										2	6		8
Judo							4	4	4	4	2		18
Shooting				4	12	12	12						40
Softball											1		1
Table tennis							2	1	2	2			7
Taekwondo			4	3	3	3	3						16
Tennis									2	3			5
Volleyball											1	1	2
Total Gold Medals			15	21	35	42	38	25	16	14	22	8	236

== Sports ==
- Aquatics
  - Diving (12)
  - Swimming (40)
  - Water polo (1)
- Athletics (46)
- Badminton (6)
- Basketball (2)
- Fencing (12)
- Football (2)
- Golf (4)
- Gymnastics
  - Artistic gymnastics (14)
  - Rhythmic gymnastics (8)
- Judo (18)
- Shooting (40)
- Softball (1)
- Table tennis (7)
- Taekwondo (16)
- Tennis (5)
- Volleyball (2)

== Medal table ==
* Host nation (Thailand)

Rank	Nation	Gold	Silver	Bronze	Total
1	China (CHN)	33	31	28	92
2	Russia (RUS)	28	28	39	95
3	Ukraine (UKR)	28	22	18	68
4	Japan (JPN)	19	15	22	56
5	South Korea (KOR)	15	18	18	51
6	Thailand (THA)*	13	7	10	30
7	Germany (GER)	11	5	9	25
8	United States (USA)	10	11	15	36
9	Chinese Taipei (TPE)	7	9	13	29
10	Italy (ITA)	6	6	9	21
11	Kazakhstan (KAZ)	5	4	7	16
12	Canada (CAN)	5	3	8	16
13	Mexico (MEX)	4	3	5	12
14	Iran (IRI)	4	1	4	9
15	Australia (AUS)	3	5	3	11
16	Belarus (BLR)	3	4	6	13
17	Turkey (TUR)	3	3	4	10
18	Austria (AUT)	3	2	3	8
19	Poland (POL)	2	5	9	16
20	Hungary (HUN)	2	3	1	6
21	North Korea (PRK)	2	1	4	7
22	Czech Republic (CZE)	2	1	2	5
23	Morocco (MAR)	2	1	0	3
24	Lithuania (LIT)	2	0	3	5
25	Switzerland (SUI)	2	0	2	4
26	Finland (FIN)	2	0	0	2
27	France (FRA)	1	6	7	14
28	Great Britain (GBR)	1	4	5	10
29	Brazil (BRA)	1	3	6	10
30	Romania (ROM)	1	2	2	5
30	Slovakia (SVK)	1	2	2	5
32	South Africa (RSA)	1	2	1	4
33	Cyprus (CYP)	1	2	0	3
33	Ireland (IRL)	1	2	0	3
35	Latvia (LAT)	1	1	1	3
35	Slovenia (SLO)	1	1	1	3
37	Egypt (EGY)	1	1	0	2
37	Mongolia (MGL)	1	1	0	2
37	Portugal (POR)	1	1	0	2
40	Algeria (ALG)	1	0	1	2
40	Cuba (CUB)	1	0	1	2
40	Georgia (GEO)	1	0	1	2
40	India (IND)	1	0	1	2
40	Uzbekistan (UZB)	1	0	1	2
45	Azerbaijan (AZE)	1	0	0	1
45	Bulgaria (BUL)	1	0	0	1
45	Montenegro (MNE)	1	0	0	1
48	Spain (ESP)	0	4	2	6
49	Serbia (SRB)	0	4	1	5
50	Croatia (CRO)	0	2	2	4
51	Belgium (BEL)	0	2	1	3
52	Estonia (EST)	0	1	1	2
52	Uganda (UGA)	0	1	1	2
54	Cameroon (CMR)	0	1	0	1
54	Israel (ISR)	0	1	0	1
54	Kenya (KEN)	0	1	0	1
54	Malaysia (MAS)	0	1	0	1
54	Mozambique (MOZ)	0	1	0	1
54	New Zealand (NZL)	0	1	0	1
60	Armenia (ARM)	0	0	3	3
60	Indonesia (INA)	0	0	3	3
62	Moldova (MDA)	0	0	2	2
63	Greece (GRE)	0	0	1	1
63	Netherlands (NED)	0	0	1	1
63	Philippines (PHI)	0	0	1	1
63	Puerto Rico (PUR)	0	0	1	1
63	Vietnam (VIE)	0	0	1	1
Totals (67 entries)		237	236	293	766
