= Miyakawa Sae =

Japanese artistic gymnast

- Born: 10 September 1999 (age 27) Nishitōkyō, Tokyo, Japan
- Height: 148 cm (4 ft 10 in)

Gymnastics career
- Country represented: Japan; (2013–2018)
- Club: Takasu Clinic
- Former coach: Yuto Hayami
- Music: 2013: "Diablo Rojo" by Rodrigo y Gabriela; 2014–2015: "This is Berk" from How to Train Your Dragon
Medal record
Representing Japan
Asian Championships
Gold medal – first place	2015 Hiroshima	Team
Silver medal – second place	2015 Hiroshima	Vault
Bronze medal – third place	2015 Hiroshima	Floor exercise
Youth Olympic Games
Bronze medal – third place	2014 Nanjing	Vault

Miyakawa Sae (宮川 紗江, Miyagawa Sae) is a Japanese retired artistic gymnast. She represented Japan at the 2014 Summer Youth Olympics and won a bronze medal on the vault. She also competed at the 2015 World Championships where she finished fourth on the floor exercise and at the 2017 World Championships where she finished eighth on the vault. She was a member of the team that won a gold medal at the 2015 Asian Championships, and individually, she won the silver medal on the vault and the bronze medal on the floor exercise. She also represented Japan at the 2016 Summer Olympics.

== Junior gymnastics career ==
Miyakawa made her international debut at the 2013 International Gymix in Montreal where Japan won the team bronze medal. At the 2013 Japan Junior International, Miyakawa finished twelfth in the all-around, fifth on vault, and won a bronze on floor exercise.

Miyakawa began the 2014 season at the City of Jesolo Trophy. The Japanese junior team finished in fourth, and Miyakawa finished seventh in the all-around with a total score of 53.200. She also finished seventh in both the vault and balance beam event finals. At the Junior Asian Championships, the Japanese team won gold, and Miyakawa won bronze in the all-around with a total score of 53.650. She also won the gold medals on vault and floor exercise.

Miyakawa was selected to compete for Japan at the 2014 Summer Youth Olympics. She finished fifth in the all-around final with a total score 53.300. She won a bronze medal in the vault final behind Wang Yan of China and Ellie Downie of Great Britain. Downie and Miyakawa had tied for second place with 14.566. For the tiebreaker, the highest scoring vault for each gymnast was used to determine who won the silver and who won the bronze. Downie's highest vault score was 14.866, and Miyakawa's was 14.800, so Miyakawa was awarded the bronze medal. Miyakawa ended her junior career at the Élite Gym Massilia, where she finished seventh with her team and twenty-eighth in the all-around.

== Senior gymnastics career ==
=== 2015 ===
Miyakawa's senior international debut was the WOGA Classic. She finished sixth in the all-around with a score of 54.350, and she won a silver medal on vault, finished fourth on uneven bars and seventh on floor exercise. She finished seventh in the all-around at the Japanese National Championships, and she finished sixth all-around at the NHK Cup. At the Japanese Individual Event Championships, Miyakawa won the gold medal on vault with a 14.925 average and finished fifth on floor exercise. She was then named to the Japanese team for the 2015 World Championships along with Natsumi Sasada, Aiko Sugihara, Asuka Teramoto, Yuki Uchiyama, and Sakura Yumoto. At the 2015 Asian Championships, Miyakawa and the Japanese team won the gold medal by almost a point over China. Miyakawa won a silver medal on vault behind Wang Yan with a 14.812 average, and she won a bronze on floor exercise with a score of 13.600. At the 2015 World Championships, the Japanese team finished in fifth. In the floor exercise event final, Miyakawa scored a 14.933 and tied for fourth with Shang Chunsong.

=== 2016 ===
Miyakawa began the 2016 season at the International Gymnix where she won the silver medal on vault behind Shallon Olsen and placed sixth with her team, seventh on uneven bars, and eighteenth in the all-around. In April, she placed seventh in the all-around final at the All-Japan Championships. She went on the place eleventh in the all-around at the NHK Trophy. Then at the All-Japan Event Championships, she won the gold medal on the vault and placed sixth on the floor exercise. She was then named to represent Japan at the 2016 Summer Olympics alongside Asuka Teramoto, Mai Murakami, Aiko Sugihara, and Yuki Uchiyama, and they placed fourth in the team final behind the United States, Russia, and China.

=== 2017 ===
In April, Miyakawa placed sixth in the all-around at the All-Japan Championships. Then in May, she placed ninth in the all-around at the NHK Cup. She won the gold medal on both the vault and the floor exercise at the All-Japan Event Championships. She was then selected to compete at the World Championships alongside Asuka Teramoto, Mai Murakami, and Aiko Sugihara. Miyakawa qualified for the vault event final where she finished eighth. After the World Championships, she competed at the Toyota International and won the gold medal on the vault.

=== 2018–2019 ===
Miyakawa placed sixth in the all-around at both the All-Japan Championships and the NHK Cup. Then at the All-Japan Event Championships, she placed seventh on both the vault and the floor exercise.

==== Coaching controversy ====
On 15 August 2018, the Japanese Gymnastics Federation indefinitely suspended Miyakawa's lifelong coach, Yuto Hayami, and banned him from the National Training Center after a whistleblower reported Hayami's violent coaching tactics on 11 July. The Japanese Gymnastics Federation found that Hayami had repeatedly employed violence towards Miyakawa during training including slapping her face and dragging her body from September 2013 until May 2018. Although Miyakawa confirmed that her coach had hit her, she spoke out against the suspension and said that the behavior was Hayami's way of "remotivating" her. Miyakawa accused the head of the women's national gymnastics team, Chieko Tsukahara, of power harassment and speculated that her coach was only banned so that Miyakawa would move to the Asahi Mutual Life Insurance Club, where Tsukahara is the head coach.

Miyakawa was initially selected to compete at the 2018 World Championships, but she withdrew following her coach's suspension. She initially stepped away from the sport, but she returned to competition at the 2019 All-Japan Championships for the Takasu Clinic Club. However, she injured her right ankle during the qualification round, and she did not compete for the rest of the year.

=== 2020–2021 ===
Miyakawa returned to competition in September 2020 at the All-Japan Championships where she finished twenty-second in the all-around. In April 2021, she finished twentieth in the all-around at the 2021 All-Japan Championships. Then at the NHK Cup, she finished eighteenth in the all-around. At the All-Japan Event Championships, she won the bronze medal on the floor exercise behind Aiko Sugihara and Chiaki Hatakeda. She was not named to Japan's team for the delayed 2020 Olympics.

=== 2024 ===
Miyakawa announced her retirement in July 2024 after competing at the Kantō regional championships but failing to qualify for the All-Japan Artistic Gymnastics Championships. She said she would work to grow gymnastics and coach children.

== Competitive history ==
Competitive history of Sae Miyakawa
Year	Event	Team	AA	VT	UB	BB	FX
2013	International Gymnix	3rd place, bronze medalist(s)					
2013	Japan Junior International		12	5			3rd place, bronze medalist(s)
2014	City of Jesolo Trophy	4	7	7		7	
2014	Junior Asian Championships	1st place, gold medalist(s)	3rd place, bronze medalist(s)	1st place, gold medalist(s)			1st place, gold medalist(s)
2014	All-Japan Championships		10				
2014	NHK Cup			7			
2014	All-Japan Event Championships			1st place, gold medalist(s)			2nd place, silver medalist(s)
2014	Youth Olympic Games		5	3rd place, bronze medalist(s)	5		
2014	Élite Gym Massilia	7	28				
2015	WOGA Classic		6	2nd place, silver medalist(s)	4		7
2015	All-Japan Championships		7				
2015	NHK Cup		6				
2015	All-Japan Event Championships			1st place, gold medalist(s)			5
2015	Asian Championships	1st place, gold medalist(s)		2nd place, silver medalist(s)			3rd place, bronze medalist(s)
2015	World Championships	5					4
2016	International Gymnix	6	18	2nd place, silver medalist(s)	7		
2016	All-Japan Championships		7				
2016	NHK Cup		11				
2016	All-Japan Event Championships			1st place, gold medalist(s)			6
2016	Olympic Games	4					
2017	All-Japan Championships		6				
2017	NHK Cup		9				
2017	All-Japan Event Championships			1st place, gold medalist(s)			1st place, gold medalist(s)
2017	World Championships			8			
2017	Toyota International			1st place, gold medalist(s)			
2018	All-Japan Championships		6				
2018	NHK Cup		6				
2018	All-Japan Event Championships			7			7
2020	All-Japan Championships		22				
2021	All-Japan Championships		20				
2021	NHK Cup		18				
2021	All-Japan Event Championships						3rd place, bronze medalist(s)
