= Gymnastics at the 2015 Summer Universiade – Women's artistic individual all-around =

Women's artistic individual all-around at the 2015 Summer Universiade
- Venue: Gwangju Women's University Universiade Gymnasium
- Date: July 6, 2015
- Competitors: 18 from 14 nations

Medalists
gold medal	Kelly Simm	Great Britain
silver medal	Asuka Teramoto	Japan
bronze medal	Natsumi Sasada	Japan

The Women's artistic individual all-around competition Gymnastics at the 2015 Summer Universiade in Gwangju was held on 6 July at the Gwangju Women's University Universiade Gymnasium.

== Schedule ==
All times are Korea Standard Time (UTC+09:00)

Date	Time	Event
Tuesday, 6 July 2015	19:30	Final

== Results ==
Rank	Team	Vault (gymnastics)	Parallel bars	Pommel horse	Floor (gymnastics)	Total
1st place, gold medalist(s)	Kelly Simm (GBR)	14.333	14.333	13.866	13.800	56.332
2nd place, silver medalist(s)	Asuka Teramoto (JPN)	14.166	14.233	14.100	13.466	55.965
3rd place, bronze medalist(s)	Natsumi Sasada (JPN)	13.933	13.533	14.500	13.466	55.432
4	Ana Filipa Martins (POR)	14.066	13.766	13.500	13.666	54.998
5	Polina Fedorova (RUS)	13.666	13.733	13.733	13.100	54.232
6	Farah Ann Abdul Hadi (MAS)	13.633	13.100	12.966	13.500	53.199
7	Daria Elizarova (RUS)	14.100	11.733	13.533	13.700	53.066
8	Emma Jane Nedov (AUS)	13.666	13.266	13.066	13.066	53.064
9	Heo Seon-mi (KOR)	13.833	14.100	11.600	13.033	52.566
10	Dilnoza Abdusalimova (UZB)	12.500	12.566	13.400	13.266	51.732
11	Eum Da-yeon (KOR)	13.566	13.600	13.200	10.900	51.266
12	Claudia Cummins (RSA)	13.700	12.300	10.366	12.833	49.199
13	Carmen Horvat (SLO)	13.533	12.233	11.266	11.533	48.565
14	Simone Penker (AUT)	12.900	11.933	11.366	12.266	48.465
15	Tracie Ang (MAS)	12.400	12.300	9.933	11.933	46.566
16	Mariana Vazquez (MEX)	14.033	11.700	9.466	10.700	45.899
17	Sofie Braaten (NOR)	12.566	10.133	10.866	12.266	45.831
18	Elisabeth Geurts (NED)	12.300	10.333	9.066	11.100	42.799
