= Gymnastics at the 2015 Summer Universiade – Women's artistic team all-around =

2015 gymnastics event

Women's artistic team all-around at the 2015 Summer Universiade
- Venue: Gwangju Women's University Universiade Gymnasium
- Date: 5 July 2015
- Competitors: 37 from 34 nations

Medalists
gold medal	Polina Fedorova; Daria Elizarova; Maria Paseka; Alla Sidorenko; Ekaterina Kramarenko	Russia
silver medal	Asuka Teramoto; Natsumi Sasada; Wakana Inoue; Sakura Yumoto; Yu Minobe	Japan
bronze medal	Heo Seon-mi; Eum Da-yeon; Park Ji-soo; Park Eun-kyung; Park Se-yeon	South Korea

The Women's artistic team all-around competition Gymnastics at the 2015 Summer Universiade in Gwangju was held on 5 July 2015 at the Gwangju Women's University Universiade Gymnasium.

== Schedule ==
All times are Korea Standard Time (UTC+09:00)

Date	Time	Event
Monday, 5 July 2015	12:00	Final

== Results ==
Rank	Team	Vault (gymnastics)	Uneven bars	Balance beam	Floor (gymnastics)	Total
1st place, gold medalist(s)	Russia (RUS)	42.750	42.800	38.550	41.400	165.500
	Alla Sidorenko	13.550		11.800	13.500	38.850
	Daria Elizarova	13.800	13.500	12.050	13.800	53.150
	Ekaterina Kramarenko		14.800	12.650		27.450
	Maria Paseka	15.300	14.500		13.000	42.800
	Polina Fedorova	13.650	13.250	13.850	14.100	54.850
2nd place, silver medalist(s)	Japan (JPN)	41.850	39.400	40.650	40.550	162.450
	Asuka Teramoto	14.200	13.800	12.600	13.700	54.300
	Natsumi Sasada	13.950	12.150	14.250	13.500	53.850
	Sakura Yumoto	13.650		12.250	12.850	38.750
	Wakana Inoue	13.700	13.450		13.350	40.500
	Yu Minobe		12.100	13.800		25.900
3rd place, bronze medalist(s)	South Korea (KOR)	41.700	39.900	39.750	39.050	160.400
	Eum Da-yeon	13.850	13.600	13.200	12.800	53.450
	Parkeun-yyung			12.150	12.700	24.850
	Park Ji-soo	13.850	12.350	13.650	13.250	53.100
	Heo Seon-mi	14.000	13.950	12.900	13.000	53.850
	Park Se-yeon	12.300	10.550			22.850
4	Malaysia (MAS)	40.200	36.200	37.400	38.600	152.400
	Ang Tracie	12.650	12.550	12.100	12.400	49.700
	Binti Farah Abdul	13.900	12.950	12.500	13.550	52.900
	Ing Yueh Tan	13.650	10.700	12.800	12.650	49.800
	Nur Eli Ellina Azmi	12.550	10.550	11.350	11.950	46.400
5	Australia (AUS)	40.550	38.800	37.150	12.400	128.900
	Emma Jane Nedov	13.750	12.450	14.000	12.400	52.600
	Georgia-Rose Brown	13.800	13.800	11.100		38.700
	Mary-Anne Monckton	13.000	12.550	12.050		37.600
Individuals
	Sofie Braaten (NOR)	12.800	9.200	11.700	11.850	45.550
	Tiril Doevre (NOR)	12.700	7.750	9.850	11.550	41.850
	Filipa Martins (POR)	14.000	13.850	13.550	13.550	54.950
	Kelly Simm (GBR)	14.350	13.800	12.750	13.900	54.800
	Dilnoza Abdusalimova (UZB)	13.600	12.550	13.500	13.200	52.850
	Claudia Cummins (RSA)	13.850	11.650	12.600	12.900	51.000
	Simone Penker (AUT)	13.150	11.250	12.150	12.100	48.650
	Carmen Horvat (SLO)	13.350	11.400	12.100	11.300	48.150
	Mariana Vazquez (MEX)	13.450	11.650	10.750	12.275	48.125
	Elisabeth Geurts (NED)	13.150	8.550	11.600	11.000	44.300
	Jordan Rae (NZL)	13.350	9.000	11.200	3.350	36.900
	Annika Urvikko (FIN)		11.600			11.600
