= All-Japan Artistic Gymnastics Championships =

The All-Japan Artistic Gymnastics Championships (Japanese: 全日本体操競技選手権大会) is one of Japan's major artistic gymnastics competition, hosted by the Japan Gymnastic Association. The first edition took place in 1947, and the championships has been held annually since then. Competitions are held in men's and women's individual all-around, team, and individual apparatus events.

== Tournament Format ==
=== Individual All-Around Championships ===
For both men and women, the preliminaries are held on the first day and the finals on the second day. Men compete in six events—floor exercise, pommel horse, rings, vault, parallel bars, and horizontal bar- while women compete in four events—vault, uneven bars, balance beam, and floor exercise—with the total score determining the final standings. The top 36 men and the top 24 women from the preliminaries advance to the finals. The top finishers in the finals advance to the NHK Trophy Artistic Gymnastics Championship, which also serves as the final selection event for international competitions.

=== Team Championships ===
Each team consists of six members for both men and women (this may vary if there are insufficient participants). The events are the same as those in the Individual All-Around Championships, but three members from each team perform in each event, and the teams compete for the highest total score.

=== Individual Event Championships ===
For both men and women, the preliminaries are held on the first day and the finals on the third day. The top 8 qualifiers in each event of the Individual All-Around Championships advance to the finals.

== Individual All-Around Winners ==
No.	Year	Location	Men	Women
1	1947	Kanazawa	Masao Takemoto	Tomiko Suzuki
2	1948	Tokyo	Masao Takemoto	Tomiko Suzuki
3	1949	Yokohama	Masao Takemoto	Fusako Wakabayashi
4	1950	Kanagawa	Masao Takemoto	Tomiko Suzuki
5	1951	Mito	Masao Takemoto	Hiroko Ikeda
6	1952	Osaka	Takashi Ono	Hiroko Ikeda
7	1953	Tokyo	Takashi Ono	Keiko Tanaka
8	1954	Tokyo	Masao Takemoto	Kyoko Sawamura
9	1955	Akita	Masao Takemoto	Keiko Tanaka
10	1956	Tokyo	Takashi Ono	Hiroko Ikeda
11	1957	Kanagawa	Takashi Ono	Keiko Tanaka
12	1958	Kumamoto	Takashi Ono	Keiko Tanaka
13	1959	Okayama	Takashi Ono	Keiko Ikeda
14	1960	Tokyo	Takashi Ono	Keiko Ikeda
15	1961	Nagasaki	Nobuyuki Aihara	Keiko Ikeda
16	1962	Niigata	Yukio Endo	Ginko Abukawa
17	1963	Tokyo	Yukio Endo	Ginko Abukawa
18	1964	Akita	Yukio Endo	Keiko Ikeda
19	1965	Kyoto	Yukio Endo	Keiko Ikeda
20	1966	Chiba	Takeshi Katō	Taki Shibuya
21	1967	Aichi	Akinori Nakayama	Keiko Ikeda
22	1968	Morioka	Akinori Nakayama	Mitsuko Kandori
23	1969	Yamaguchi	Sawao Kato	Chieko Oda
24	1970	Kobe	Akinori Nakayama	Miyuki Matsuhisa
25	1971	Kofu	Akinori Nakayama	Miyuki Matsuhisa
26	1972	Yonago	Eizo Kenmotsu	Takako Hasegawa
27	1973	Sapporo	Mitsuo Tsukahara	Miyuki Matsuhisa
28	1974	Okayama	Eizo Kenmotsu	Miyuki Matsuhisa
29	1975	Nagano	Mitsuo Tsukahara; Hiroshi Kajiyama	Miyuki Matsuhisa
30	1976	Mito	Eizo Kenmotsu	Satoko Okazaki
31	1977	Shizuoka	Shigeru Kasamatsu	Ayako Akabane
32	1978	Kitakyushu	Hajime Mikami	Yayoi Kano
33	1979	Hachioji	Toshiomi Nishikii	Ayako Akabane
34	1980	Isesaki	Kōji Gushiken	Yayoi Kano
35	1981	Karatsu	Kōji Gushiken	Yayoi Kano
36	1982	Maebashi	Kōji Gushiken	Maiko Morio
37	1983	Kashihara	Kyoji Yamawaki	Maiko Morio
38	1984	Kobe	Kōji Gushiken	Noriko Mochizuki
39	1985	Kofu	Kyoji Yamawaki	Noriko Mochizuki
40	1986	Sasebo	Koichi Mizushima	Miho Shinoda
41	1987	Hyūga	Koichi Mizushima	Miho Shinoda
42	1988	Sendai	Toshiharu Sato	Mari Kosuge
43	1989	Kitakyushu	Toshiharu Sato	Mari Kosuge
44	1990	Komatsu	Daisuke Nishikawa	Mari Kosuge
45	1991	Yamagata	Daisuke Nishikawa	Mari Kosuge
46	1992	Takamatsu	Yutaka Aihara	Mari Kosuge
47	1993	Nagoya	Yoshiaki Hatakeda	Hanako Miura
48	1994	Koriyama	Hikaru Tanaka	Risa Sugawara
49	1995	Hiroshima	Yoshiaki Hatakeda	Miho Hashiguchi
50	1996	Osaka	Naoya Tsukahara	Risa Sugawara; Yuki Ohata
51	1997	Kanagawa	Naoya Tsukahara	Risa Sugawara
52	1998	Kumamoto	Naoya Tsukahara	Risa Sugawara
53	1999	Toyama	Naoya Tsukahara	Risa Sugawara
54	2000	Sendai	Naoya Tsukahara	Miho Takenaka
55	2001	Kochi	Hiroyuki Tomita	Erika Mizoguchi
56	2002	Shizuoka	Hiroyuki Tomita	Minami Ishizaka
57	2003	Kumagai	Isao Yoneda	Minami Ishizaka
58	2004	Tokyo	Hiroyuki Tomita	Chihiro Ichikawa
59	2005	Amagasaki	Hiroyuki Tomita	Miki Uemura
60	2006	Tokyo	Hiroyuki Tomita	Koko Tsurumi; Miki Uemura
61	2007	Tokyo	Hiroyuki Tomita	Koko Tsurumi
62	2008	Joetsu	Kōhei Uchimura	Koko Tsurumi
63	2009	Tokyo	Kōhei Uchimura	Koko Tsurumi
64	2010	Tokyo	Kōhei Uchimura	Koko Tsurumi
65	2011	Tokyo	Kōhei Uchimura	Koko Tsurumi
66	2012	Tokyo	Kōhei Uchimura	Rie Tanaka
67	2013	Tokyo	Kōhei Uchimura	Natsumi Sasada
68	2014	Tokyo	Kōhei Uchimura	Natsumi Sasada
69	2015	Tokyo	Kōhei Uchimura	Asuka Teramoto
70	2016	Tokyo	Kōhei Uchimura	Mai Murakami
71	2017	Tokyo	Kōhei Uchimura	Mai Murakami
72	2018	Tokyo	Kakeru Tanigawa	Mai Murakami
73	2019	Chōfu	Kakeru Tanigawa	Asuka Teramoto
74	2020	Takasaki	Kazuma Kaya	Mai Murakami
75	2021	Takasaki	Daiki Hashimoto	Mai Murakami
76	2022	Shibuya	Daiki Hashimoto	Arisa Kasahara
77	2023	Tokyo	Daiki Hashimoto	Hazuki Watanabe
78	2024	Takasaki	Daiki Hashimoto	Shoko Miyata
79	2025	Takasaki	Daiki Hashimoto	Rina Kishi
80	2026	Takasaki	Daiki Hashimoto	Misa Nishiyama

== Team Championship Winners ==
Times	Year	Venue	Men's championship	Women's championship
1	1947	Kanazawa	Swallow Club A	
2	1948	Tokyo	Swallow Club A	
3	1949	Yokohama	Swallow Club A	
4	1950	Kanagawa	Swallow Club A	Gunma Team
5	1951	Mito	Swallow Club A	Swallow Club
6	1952	Osaka	Otsuka Club A	Tokyo University of Physical Education Junior College
7	1953	Tokyo	Otsuka Club A	Ontoshi Club
8	1954	Tokyo	Swallow Club A	Sound Club A
9	1955	Akita	Japan University of Physical Education	Sound Club A
10	1956	Tokyo	Japan Sports University	Tokyo University of Education
11	1957	Kanagawa	Otsuka Club	Tokyo University of Education
12	1958	Kumamoto	Japanese Sports Swallow Club	Otsuka Club
13	1959	Okayama	Nippon Sports Swallow Club	Otsuka Club
14	1960	Tokyo	Japan Sports Swallow Club	Japan Sports Swallow Club
15	1961	Nagasaki	Nippon Sports Swallow Club	Japan Sports University
16	1962	Niigata	Nippon Sports Swallow Club	Japan Sports University
17	1963	Tokyo	Otsuka Club	Nittai Swallow Club
18	1964	Akita	Nichitai Swallow Club	Nittai Swallow Club
19	1965	Kyoto	Japanese Sports Swallow Club	Japanese Sports Swallow Club
20	1966	Chiba	Nichitai Swallow Club	Nichitai Swallow Club
21	1967	Aichi	Nippon Sports Swallow Club	Nippon Sports University
22	1968	Morioka	Nippon Sports Swallow Club	Japan Sports University
23	1969	Yamaguchi	Japan Sports University	Japan Sports University
24	1970	Kobe	Otsuka Club	Japan Sports University
25	1971	Kofu	Otsuka Club	Japan Sports University
26	1972	Yonago	Otsuka Club	Japan Sports University
27	1973	Sapporo	Japan Sports University	Japan Sports University
28	1974	Okayama	Kiyo Bank	Japan Sports University
29	1975	Nagano	Kiyo Bank	Japan Sports University
30	1976	Mito	Kawai Musical Instruments	Japan Sports University
31	1977	Shizuoka	Kiyo Bank	Japan Sports University
32	1978	Kitakyushu	Kiyo Bank	Kokugakuin High School
33	1979	Hachioji	Kawai Musical Instruments	Kokugakuin High School
34	1980	Isesaki	Kiyo Bank	Kokugakuin High School
35	1981	Karatsu	Yamato Bank	University of Tsukuba
36	1982	Maebashi	Kiyo Bank	Japan Sports University
37	1983	Kashihara	Yamato Bank	Japan Sports University
38	1984	Kobe	Kiyo Bank	Asahi Life Gymnastics Club
39	1985	Kofu	Yamato Bank	Asahi Life Gymnastics Club
40	1986	Sasebo	Yamato Bank	Asahi Life Gymnastics Club
41	1987	Hyuga	Yamato Bank	Asahi Life Gymnastics Club
42	1988	Sendai	Japan Sports University	Asahi Life Gymnastics Club
43	1989	Kitakyushu	Nippon University of Physical Education	Asahi Life Gymnastics Club
44	1990	Komatsu	Nihon University	Asahi Life Gymnastics Club
45	1991	Yamagata	Yamato Bank	Asahi Life Gymnastics Club
46	1992	Takamatsu	Nippon Sports University	Asahi Life Gymnastics Club
47	1993	Nagoya	Yamato Bank	Asahi Life Gymnastics Club
48	1994	Koriyama	Yamato Bank	Asahi Life Gymnastics Club
49	1995	Hiroshima	Kiyo Bank	Asahi Life Gymnastics Club
50	1996	Osaka	Yamato Bank	Asahi Life Gymnastics Club
51	1997	Kanagawa	Nihon University	Japan University of Physical Education
52	1998	Kumamoto	Juntendo University	Asahi Life Gymnastics Club
53	1999	Toyama	Yamato Bank	Asahi Life Gymnastics Club
54	2000	Sendai	Tokushukai Gymnastics Club	Asahi Life Gymnastics Club
55	2001	Kochi	Daishokai Gymnastics Club	Asahi Life Gymnastics Club
56	2002	Shizuoka	Juntendo University	Asahi Life Gymnastics Club
57	2003	Kumagaya	Tokushukai Gymnastics Club	Asahi Life Gymnastics Club
58	2004	Tokyo	Tokushukai Gymnastics Club	Asahi Life Gymnastics Club
59	2005	Amagasaki	Tokushukai Gymnastics Club	Toda City Sports Center
60	2006	Tokyo	Tokushukai Gymnastics Club	Japan University of Physical Education
61	2007	Tokyo	Tokushukai Gymnastics Club	Asahi Life Gymnastics Club
62	2008	Joetsu	Japan Sports University	Asahi Life Gymnastics Club
63	2009	Tokyo	KONAMI	Asahi Life Gymnastics Club
64	2010	Yamaguchi	Japan Sports University	Japan Sports University
65	2011	Tokyo	KONAMI	Japan Sports University
66	2012	Tokyo	Juntendo University	Japan Sports University
67	2013	Chiba	KONAMI	Asahi Life Gymnastics Club
68	2014	Tokyo	KONAMI	Japan Sports University
69	2015	Tokyo	Japan Sports University	Japan Sports University
70	2016	Tokyo	Juntendo University	Japan Sports University
71	2017	Takasaki	Juntendo University	Japan Sports University
72	2018	Takasaki	Juntendo University	Japan Sports University
73	2019	Takasaki	Central Sports	Japan Sports University
75	2021	Yoyogi	Juntendo University	Japan Sports University
76	2022	Fukui	Tokushukai Gymnastics Club	Sabae School
77	2023	Yokkaichi	Tokushukai Gymnastics Club	Sabae High School
78	2024	Yokkaichi	Tokushukai Gymnastics Club	Namba Gymnastics Club-ngc
79	2025	Takasaki	Tokushukai Gymnastics Club	Namba Gymnastics Club-ngc

== Multiple medalists ==
All-Around Men's
Rank	Gymnast	Nation	Years	Gold
1	Kōhei Uchimura	Japan	2008-2017	10
2	Masao Takemoto	Japan	1947-1951, 1954-1955	7
2	Takashi Ono	Japan	1952-1953, 1956-1960	7
4	Daiki Hashimoto	Japan	2021-2026	6
4	Hiroyuki Tomita	Japan	2001-2002, 2004-2007	6
6	Naoya Tsukahara	Japan	1996-2000	5
7	Yukio Endo	Japan	1962-1965	4
7	Akinori Nakayama	Japan	1967-1968, 1970-1971	4
7	Kōji Gushiken	Japan	1980-1982, 1984	4
10	Eizo Kenmotsu	Japan	1972, 1974, 1976	3
11	Mitsuo Tsukahara	Japan	1973, 1975	2
11	Kyoji Yamawaki	Japan	1983, 1985	2
11	Koichi Mizushima	Japan	1986, 1987	2
11	Toshiharu Sato	Japan	1988, 1989	2
11	Daisuke Nishikawa	Japan	1990, 1991	2
11	Yoshiaki Hatakeda	Japan	1993, 1995	2
11	Kakeru Tanigawa	Japan	2018, 2019	2
18	Nobuyuki Aihara	Japan	1961	1
18	Takeshi Katō	Japan	1966	1
18	Sawao Kato	Japan	1969	1
18	Hiroshi Kajiyama	Japan	1975	1
18	Shigeru Kasamatsu	Japan	1977	1
18	Hajime Mikami	Japan	1978	1
18	Toshiomi Nishikii	Japan	1979	1
18	Yutaka Aihara	Japan	1992	1
18	Hikaru Tanaka	Japan	1994	1
18	Isao Yoneda	Japan	2003	1
18	Kaya Kazuma	Japan	2020	1

All-Around Women's
Rank	Gymnast	Nation	Years	Gold
1	Keiko Tanaka-Ikeda	Japan	1953, 1955, 1957-1961, 1964-1965, 1967	10
2	Koko Tsurumi	Japan	2006-2011	6
3	Miyuki Matsuhisa	Japan	1970-1971, 1973-1975	5
3	Mari Kosuge	Japan	1988-1992	5
3	Risa Sugawara	Japan	1994, 1996-1999	5
3	Mai Murakami	Japan	2016-2018, 2020-2021	5
7	Tomiko Suzuki	Japan	1947-1948, 1950	3
7	Hiroko Ikeda	Japan	1951-1952, 1956	3
7	Yayoi Kano	Japan	1978, 1980-1981	3
10	Ginko Abukawa	Japan	1962-1963	2
10	Ayako Akabane	Japan	1977, 1979	2
10	Maiko Morio	Japan	1982-1983	2
10	Noriko Mochizuki	Japan	1984-1985	2
10	Miho Shinoda	Japan	1986-1987	2
10	Minami Ishizaka	Japan	2002-2003	2
10	Miki Uemura	Japan	2005-2006	2
10	Natsumi Sasada	Japan	2013-2014	2
10	Asuka Teramoto	Japan	2015, 2019	2
19	Fusako Wakabayashi	Japan	1949	1
19	Kyoko Sawamura	Japan	1954	1
19	Taki Shibuya	Japan	1966	1
19	Mitsuko Kandori	Japan	1968	1
19	Chieko Oda	Japan	1969	1
19	Takako Hasegawa	Japan	1972	1
19	Satoko Okazaki	Japan	1976	1
19	Hanako Miura	Japan	1993	1
19	Miho Hashiguchi	Japan	1995	1
19	Yuki Ohata	Japan	1996	1
19	Miho Takenaka	Japan	2000	1
19	Erika Mizoguchi	Japan	2001	1
19	Chihiro Ichikawa	Japan	2004	1
19	Rie Tanaka	Japan	2012	1
19	Arisa Kasahara	Japan	2022	1
19	Hazuki Watanabe	Japan	2023	1
19	Shoko Miyata	Japan	2024	1
19	Rina Kishi	Japan	2025	1
19	Misa Nishiyama	Japan	2026	1
