= Miho Shinoda =

Japanese gymnast and musician (born 1972)

- 信田 美帆
- Born: 18 May 1972 (age 54) Tachikawa, Tokyo, Japan
- Height: 152 cm (5 ft 0 in)

Gymnastics career
- Discipline: Women's artistic gymnastics
- Country represented: Japan
- Club: Asahi Seimei
- Head coaches: Mitsuo Tsukahara; Chieko Oda
- Retired: c. 1993
Medal record
Women's artistic gymnastics
Representing Japan
Universiade
Bronze medal – third place	1993 Buffalo	Team
- Musical career
- Origin: Tokyo, Japan
- Genre: J-pop
- Occupation: Singer
- Years active: 1999—2000, 2009
- Formerly of: Taiyō to Ciscomoon; T&C Bomber; Akagumi 4
- Website: Official blog

Miho Shinoda (信田 美帆, Shinoda Miho; born 18 May 1972), is a former Japanese gymnast and singer. She was a member of the Japan women's national artistic gymnastics team, won a bronze medal at the 1993 Summer Universiade, and appeared at the 1988 Summer Olympics. From 1999 to 2000, she was the leader of the girl group Taiyo to Ciscomoon and associated with Hello! Project.

== Gymnastics career ==
Shinoda was born in Tachikawa, Tokyo, Japan, and became known in the mid-1980s as an elite-level gymnast. She trained at Asahi Seimei under coaches Mitsuo Tsukahara and Chieko Oda. She won multiple Japanese national championships, including the 1987 all-around title.

She competed internationally for Japan, most notably at the 1987 and 1989 World Artistic Gymnastics Championships, as well as the 1988 Summer Olympics where she placed 34th in the all-around.

Her last major competition was the 1993 All-Japan Artistic Gymnastics Championships.

== Musical career ==
She began a second career as a singer in 1999, after a televised audition by Hello! Project Taiyo to Ciscomoon, which was later called T&C Bomber. She was also a participant in the short-lived group Akagumi 4 in 2000. She quit Hello! Project after her group was eliminated at the end of 2000, and she returned to the sporting world as a women's artistic gymnastics coach. During the 2004 Summer Olympics, she provided gymnastics commentary for Japanese television.

In 2009, Shinoda rejoined the group Taiyo to Ciscomoon for a series of reunion concerts.
