= Ofir Netzer =

Israeli artistic gymnast

- אופיר נצר
- Born: 13 May 1996 (age 30) Moledet, Israel

Gymnastics career
- Discipline: Women's artistic gymnastics
- Country represented: Israel
- Club: Club Esportiu Xelska; Hapoel Emek Hayarden
- Head coach: Pedro Mir Homar
- Former coach: Boris Kinev (d. 2018)
- Retired: 11 May 2025
Medal record
Representing Israel
Maccabiah Games
Gold medal – first place	2017 Jerusalem	Vault
FIG World Cup
Event	1st	2nd	3rd
Apparatus World Cup	0	1	0
World Challenge Cup	1	0	0
Total	1	1	0

Ofir Netzer (Hebrew: אופיר נצר; born 13 May 1996) is an Israeli retired artistic gymnast. She is the 2018 FIG World Challenge Cup series champion and 2017 Maccabiah Games champion on vault.

== Early life ==
Netzer was born in Moledet, Israel. She was a soldier in the Israel Defense Forces but held a special status for outstanding athletes that enabled her to serve close to home so that she could continue training and travel overseas when needed.

== Gymnastics career ==
=== 2013 ===
Netzer competed at the 2013 Cottbus World Cup in March where she qualified to the vault final and finished in seventh place. In April she competed at the 2013 European Artistic Gymnastics Championships where she once again qualified to the vault final. She finished fourth behind Giulia Steingruber of Switzerland, Noël van Klaveren of the Netherlands, and Larisa Iordache of Romania. She later competed at the 2013 World Artistic Gymnastics Championships but finished thirteenth in vault qualifications and failed to qualify to the finals.

=== 2014 ===
In 2014, Netzer tore her ACL during training.

=== 2015 ===
Netzer returned to competition in March and competed at the Cottbus World Cup where she finished thirteenth in vault qualifications and did not make the finals. In April she competed at the Ljubljana Challenge Cup where she placed eighteenth in vault qualifications and once again failed to make the finals. She later competed at the 2015 European Artistic Gymnastics Championships. She finished fifteenth in vault qualifications and did not make the final.

=== 2017 ===
Netzer competed at the Sainté Gym Cup in March 2017 where Israel finished seventh in the team final. In April she competed at the Stella Zakharova Cup where she finished twelfth in the all-around, seventh on uneven bars, fifth on balance beam, and eighth on floor exercise. She later competed at the 2017 European Artistic Gymnastics Championships where she finished 63rd in the all-around qualification and did not qualify to any individual events. In May Netzer competed at the Koper Challenge Cup and the Osijek Challenge Cup but failed to qualify to any event finals. In July she competed at the 2017 Maccabiah Games where she placed eighth in the all-around, first on vault, and fifth on floor exercise. In September Netzer competed at the Varna Challenge Cup where she placed fourth on vault behind Rebeca Andrade of Brazil, Shallon Olsen of Canada, and Teja Belak of Slovenia. Later that month she competed at a Dutch Invitational where she placed tenth in the all-around and fourth on vault. In October she competed at the 2017 Artistic Gymnastics World Championships. During qualifications she placed sixty-first in the all-around and thirty-sixth on vault. She did not qualify to any event finals.

=== 2018 ===
In May 2018 Netzer competed at the Osijek Challenge Cup where she finished twelfth in vault qualification. She later competed at the Koper Challenge Cup where she placed fourth on vault behind Steingruber, Denisa Golgota of Romania, and Tjaša Kysselef of Slovenia. In July Netzer competed at the Israeli Championships where she won gold on every event. In August she competed at the European Championships but failed to qualify for any event finals. In September Netzer competed at the Szombathely Challenge Cup where she placed first on vault, earning her first gold medal at a FIG World Cup. A few weeks later Netzer competed at the Paris Challenge Cup where she placed fourth on vault. Due to her first-place finish in Szombathely and her fourth-place finishes in Koper and Paris, Netzer won the 2018 World Challenge Cup series on vault. Netzer was later selected to represent Israel at the 2018 World Championships alongside Meitar Lavy. During qualifications Netzer placed 19th on vault and did not qualify to the finals.

In late 2018, Netzer's longtime coach, Boris Kinev, died after being sick for months.

=== 2019 ===
In early 2019, Netzer relocated to Palma de Mallorca, Spain to train full time under Spaniard Pedro Mir after being unable to find a new coach in Israel. Her first competition in 2019 was the Baku World Cup. She finished 11th in the vault qualifications, 16th on uneven bars, 21st on balance beam, and 16th on floor exercise. She did not qualify to any event finals.

In June Netzer competed at the European Games, where she qualified to the vault final. During the final she performed a handspring front tuck full and a Tsuk layout full and she finished fifth.

In August Netzer tore her ACL and therefore missed competing at the 2019 World Championships and was unable to qualify herself a spot for the 2020 Summer Olympics.

=== 2021 ===
Netzer returned to competition in April 2021 to compete at the European Championships. She finished 46th in the all-around and 12th on vault during qualification and did not advance to any event finals. In October she competed at the World Championships where she qualified to the vault event final. In doing so Netzer became the first Israel female artistic gymnast to qualify to an individual event final at a World Championships. During the event final she finished sixth.

=== 2025 ===
In May 2025 Netzer announced her retirement.

== Competitive history ==
Year	Event	Team	AA	VT	UB	BB	FX
2013	Cottbus World Cup			7			
2013	European Championships			4			
2017	Sainté Gym Cup	7					
2017	Stella Zakharova Cup		12		7	5	8
2017	Maccabiah Games		8	1st place, gold medalist(s)			5
2017	Varna Challenge Cup			4			
2017	Dutch Invitational		10	4			
2018	Koper Challenge Cup			4			
2018	Israeli Championships		1st place, gold medalist(s)	1st place, gold medalist(s)	1st place, gold medalist(s)	1st place, gold medalist(s)	1st place, gold medalist(s)
2018	Szombathely Challenge Cup			1st place, gold medalist(s)			
2018	Paris Challenge Cup			4			
2019
2019	European Games			5			
2021
2021	World Championships			6			
2022	Cottbus World Cup			2nd place, silver medalist(s)	6		
2022	European Championships		41				
2022	World Championships		64				
2024	DTB Pokal Team Challenge	10					
2024	European Championships	18					
