= T&C =

T&C may refer to:

- Time & Charges, a service provided by telephone operators
- Technology and Culture, a journal about the history of technology
- Taiyō to Ciscomoon, later known as T&C Bomber, a Japanese girl band
- T & C Tower, or Tuntex Sky Tower, a skyscraper in Taiwan

== See also ==
- Terms and conditions (T&Cs)
