= Thomas Grasso =

Thomas Grasso may refer to:

- Thomas J. Grasso (1962–1995), American convicted murderer
- Thomas Grasso (gymnast) (born 2000), Italian artistic gymnast
