= 2021 World Artistic Gymnastics Championships =

Artistic gymnastics competition

2021 World Artistic Gymnastics Championships

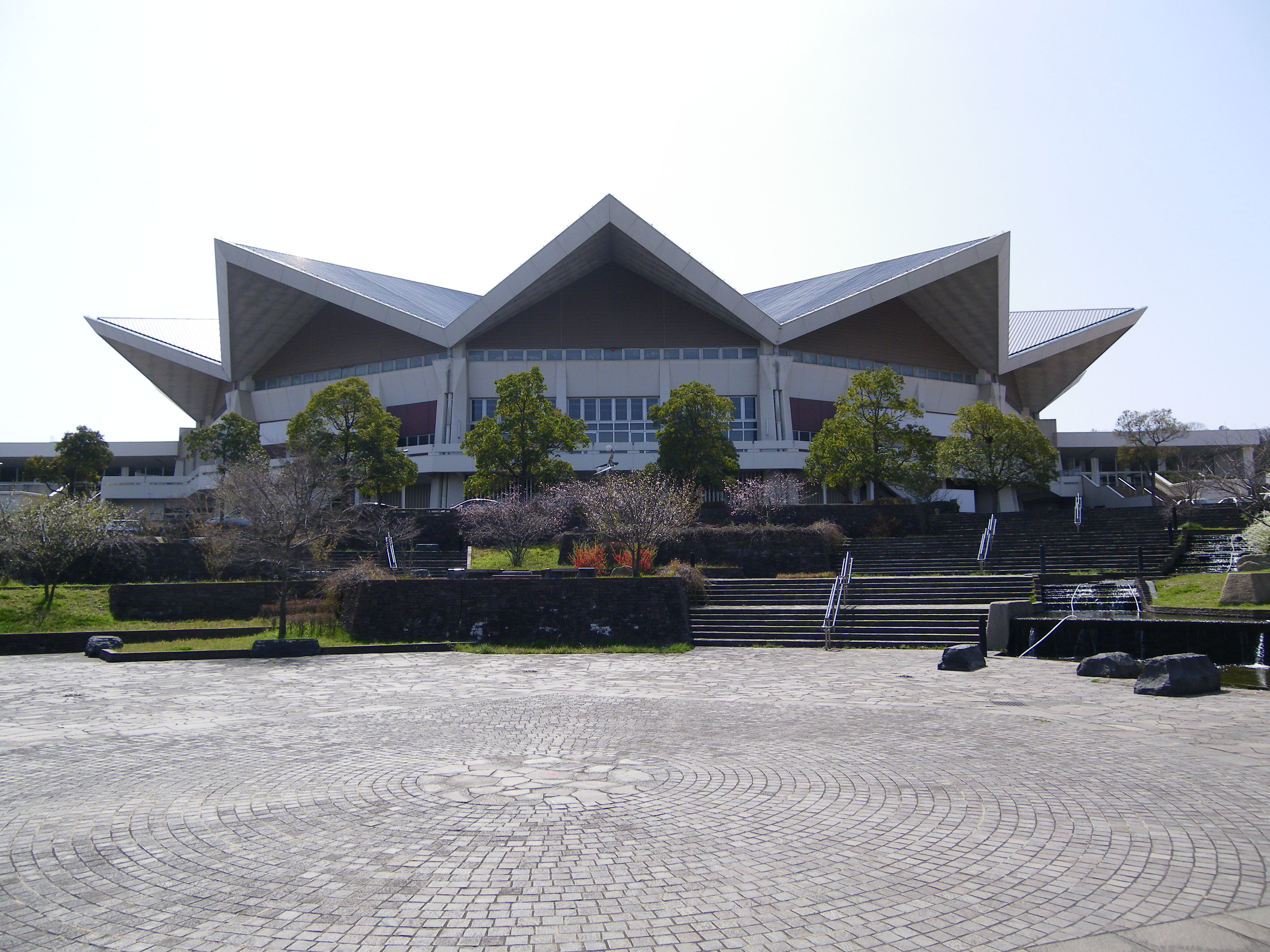
- Venue: Kitakyushu City General Gymnasium
- Location: Kitakyushu, Japan
- Start date: October 18, 2021
- End date: October 24, 2021
- Competitors: 312 (196 male, 116 female) from 56 nations

The 2021 World Artistic Gymnastics Championships were held in Kitakyushu, Japan from October 18–24, 2021. The competition took place at the Kitakyushu City General Gymnasium. It was the third time that Japan hosted the event, following the 1995 and 2011 editions.

The competition was originally scheduled to be held in Copenhagen, Denmark, before the Danish Gymnastics Federation withdrew from hosting in July 2020. In November 2020, the Fédération Internationale de Gymnastique announced Kitakyushu as the replacement host city for the same dates.

Although the World Championships are traditionally not held in Olympic years, the postponement of the 2020 Summer Olympics caused the 2021 event to fall during the same year. The last time the Olympics and the World Championships were held in the same year was in 1996.

== Competition schedule ==
Date	Session	Time	Subdivisions
Friday, October 15 – Sunday, October 17	Podium training		
Monday, October 18	Women's Qualification	9:45 AM	WAG: Subdivision 1 Uzbekistan, China, Turkey, Israel
Monday, October 18	Women's Qualification	11:15 AM	WAG: Subdivision 2 Netherlands, Italy, Great Britain, Hungary
Monday, October 18	Women's Qualification	1:00 PM	WAG: Subdivision 3 Canada, Australia, United States, Croatia, Norway
Monday, October 18	Women's Qualification	2:30 PM	WAG: Subdivision 4 Portugal, Switzerland, Iceland, Colombia, Lithuania
Monday, October 18	Women's Qualification	4:00 PM	WAG: Subdivision 5 Denmark, Japan, Luxembourg, Chinese Taipei, Ukraine, Cuba
Monday, October 18	Women's Qualification	5:45 PM	WAG: Subdivision 6 Finland, Austria, Germany, Ecuador, Egypt, New Zealand
Monday, October 18	Women's Qualification	7:15 PM	WAG: Subdivision 7 France, Puerto Rico, India, Sweden, Romania
Tuesday, October 19	Women's Qualification	9:45 AM	WAG: Subdivision 8 Czech Republic, Latvia, Azerbaijan, Hong Kong, Vietnam, Slovenia, Belarus
Tuesday, October 19	Women's Qualification	11:15 AM	WAG: Subdivision 9 Brazil, Panama, Ireland, Mexico
Tuesday, October 19	Women's Qualification	1:00 PM	WAG: Subdivision 10; RGF (Note: Under the Court of Arbitration for Sport ban, Russia may not use its name, flag, or anthem and must present themselves as "Neutral Athlete" or "Neutral Team" at any world championships until December 16, 2022. Thus, Russian gymnasts competed under a modified flag of the Artistic Gymnastics Federation of Russia and the name "RGF" at the 2021 World Championships.), Slovakia, South Korea, Belgium
Tuesday, October 19	Men's Qualification	5:00 PM	MAG: Subdivision 1 Spain, Bulgaria, Greece, France, Portugal, Germany
Tuesday, October 19	Men's Qualification	7:10 PM	MAG: Subdivision 2 Slovenia, Hong Kong, China, Belgium, Ukraine, Latvia, RGF, Saudi Arabia, Hungary
Wednesday, October 20	Men's Qualification	9:20 AM	MAG: Subdivision 3 Japan, Azerbaijan, Armenia, Panama, New Zealand, Brazil, Bangladesh, Switzerland
Wednesday, October 20	Men's Qualification	11:10 AM	MAG: Subdivision 4 Lithuania, Iceland, Puerto Rico, Netherlands, Syria, Chinese Taipei, United States, Belarus
Wednesday, October 20	Men's Qualification	1:20 PM	MAG: Subdivision 5 Thailand, Romania, Colombia, Kazakhstan, Mexico, Egypt, Australia
Wednesday, October 20	Men's Qualification	3:10 PM	MAG: Subdivision 6 Turkey, Vietnam, Ecuador, Canada, Great Britain, Serbia, Ireland, South Korea, Albania
Wednesday, October 20	Men's Qualification	5:20 PM	MAG: Subdivision 7 Uzbekistan, Italy, Denmark, Czech Republic, Philippines, Finland, Croatia
Wednesday, October 20	Men's Qualification	7:10 PM	MAG: Subdivision 8 Israel, Cyprus, India, Sweden, Austria, Iran, Norway, Poland
Thursday, October 21	Women's Individual All-Around Final	6:00–8:50 PM	Top 24 from qualification
Friday, October 22	Men's Individual All-Around Final	6:00–8:50 PM	Top 24 from qualification
Saturday, October 23	Apparatus Finals	4:10–7:35 PM	MAG: Floor, Pommel horse, Rings
Saturday, October 23	Apparatus Finals	4:10–7:35 PM	WAG: Vault, Uneven bars
Sunday, October 24	Apparatus Finals	4:25–7:45 PM	MAG: Vault, Parallel bars, Horizontal bar
Sunday, October 24	Apparatus Finals	4:25–7:45 PM	WAG: Balance beam, Floor
Listed in local time (UTC+09:00).

== Medal summary ==
=== Medalists ===
Event	Gold	Silver	Bronze
Men
Individual all-around	(China) Zhang Boheng	(Japan) Daiki Hashimoto	(Ukraine) Illia Kovtun
Floor	(Italy) Nicola Bartolini	(Japan) Kazuki Minami	(Finland) Emil Soravuo
Pommel horse	(United States) Stephen Nedoroscik	(China) Weng Hao (Japan) Kazuma Kaya	None awarded
Rings	(China) Lan Xingyu	(Italy) Marco Lodadio	(Italy) Salvatore Maresca Grigorii Klimentev
Vault	(Philippines) Carlos Yulo	(Japan) Hidenobu Yonekura	(Israel) Andrey Medvedev
Parallel bars	(China) Hu Xuwei	(Philippines) Carlos Yulo	(China) Shi Cong
Horizontal bar	(China) Hu Xuwei	(Japan) Daiki Hashimoto	(United States) Brody Malone
Women
Individual all-around	Angelina Melnikova	(United States) Leanne Wong	(United States) Kayla DiCello
Vault	(Brazil) Rebeca Andrade	(Italy) Asia D'Amato	Angelina Melnikova
Uneven bars	(China) Wei Xiaoyuan	(Brazil) Rebeca Andrade	(China) Luo Rui
Balance beam	(Japan) Urara Ashikawa	(Germany) Pauline Schaefer-Betz	(Japan) Mai Murakami
Floor	(Japan) Mai Murakami	Angelina Melnikova	(United States) Leanne Wong

=== Medal standings ===
==== Overall ====
* Host nation (Japan)

Rank	Nation	Gold	Silver	Bronze	Total
1	China	5	1	2	8
2	Japan*	2	5	1	8
3	Italy	1	2	1	4
4	United States	1	1	3	5
5	RGF	1	1	2	4
6	Brazil	1	1	0	2
6	Philippines	1	1	0	2
8	Germany	0	1	0	1
9	Finland	0	0	1	1
9	Israel	0	0	1	1
9	Ukraine	0	0	1	1
Totals (11 entries)		12	13	12	37

==== Men ====
* Host nation (Japan)

Rank	Nation	Gold	Silver	Bronze	Total
1	China	4	1	1	6
2	Italy	1	1	1	3
3	Philippines	1	1	0	2
4	United States	1	0	1	2
5	Japan*	0	5	0	5
6	Finland	0	0	1	1
6	Israel	0	0	1	1
6	RGF	0	0	1	1
6	Ukraine	0	0	1	1
Totals (9 entries)		7	8	7	22

==== Women ====
* Host nation (Japan)

Rank	Nation	Gold	Silver	Bronze	Total
1	Japan*	2	0	1	3
2	RGF	1	1	1	3
3	Brazil	1	1	0	2
4	China	1	0	1	2
5	United States	0	1	2	3
6	Germany	0	1	0	1
6	Italy	0	1	0	1
Totals (7 entries)		5	5	5	15

== Men's results ==
=== Individual all-around ===
China's Zhang Boheng narrowly defeated reigning Olympic champion Daiki Hashimoto of Japan by 0.017 points to take the title. Both won their first individual World medals. Ukrainian gymnast Illia Kovtun rounded out the podium in bronze.

Both Zhang and Hashimoto later withdrew from the first day of event finals.

Rank	Gymnast	Floor (gymnastics)	Pommel horse	Rings (gymnastics)	Vault (gymnastics)	Parallel bars	Horizontal bar	Total
1st place, gold medalist(s)	(China) Zhang Boheng	14.883	13.466	14.600	14.866	15.366	14.800	87.981
2nd place, silver medalist(s)	(Japan) Daiki Hashimoto	14.833	14.166	13.966	14.800	15.066	15.133	87.964
3rd place, bronze medalist(s)	(Ukraine) Illia Kovtun	14.366	14.400	12.933	14.300	14.400	14.500	84.899
4	(United States) Yul Moldauer	14.500	14.866	12.466	14.333	14.900	13.300	84.365
5	(Turkey) Ahmet Önder	14.100	13.800	13.666	13.966	14.800	13.900	84.232
6	(China) Shi Cong	14.466	13.500	13.733	14.658	13.400	14.300	84.057
7	(Spain) Joel Plata	14.133	13.766	13.200	14.000	14.666	13.600	83.365
8	(Canada) William Emard	14.633	12.433	14.625	14.466	13.766	13.333	83.256
9	(United Kingdom) Joshua Nathan	13.700	15.000	12.833	14.366	13.966	13.366	83.231
10	(Spain) Néstor Abad	13.900	13.233	13.666	14.233	14.366	13.333	82.731
11	(Turkey) Adem Asil	14.400	12.733	14.466	14.700	12.600	13.800	82.699
12	(Switzerland) Henji Mboyo	13.700	13.700	13.400	14.058	13.900	13.933	82.691
13	(Brazil) Caio Souza	13.300	12.200	13.966	14.633	14.566	14.000	82.665
14	(Hungary) Krisztofer Mészáros	13.800	13.716	13.066	13.833	13.633	13.533	81.581
15	(Lithuania) Robert Tvorogal	13.033	13.200	13.175	13.666	14.466	14.000	81.540
16	(Belgium) Luka Van den Keybus	13.666	12.933	12.833	14.533	13.500	13.800	81.265
17	Nikita Ignatyev	13.733	12.466	13.366	14.116	13.400	13.566	80.647
18	(Finland) Robert Kirmes	13.866	13.700	12.633	13.966	13.266	12.366	79.797
19	(Greece) Nikolaos Iliopoulos	12.733	12.633	13.308	14.033	13.666	13.366	79.739
20	(Belgium) Noah Kuavita	13.600	12.900	12.366	13.300	13.166	14.266	79.598
21	(Norway) Sofus Heggemsnes	12.500	13.600	13.233	14.266	12.500	13.200	79.299
22	(Finland) Oskar Kirmes	13.566	13.333	12.500	13.666	13.700	11.466	78.231
23	(Israel) Eyal Indig	12.833	12.666	11.166	13.466	13.300	12.833	76.264
24	(Austria) Alexander Benda	12.333	11.200	12.666	13.633	13.000	11.333	74.165

- (Colombia) Jossimar Calvo withdrew after testing positive for COVID-19. He was replaced in the fourth rotation group by first reserve (Austria) Alexander Benda.
- (Kazakhstan) Milad Karimi withdrew to focus on event finals. He was replaced in the third rotation group by second reserve (Finland) Robert Kirmes.
- (Cyprus) Ilias Georgiou withdrew and was replaced in the second rotation group by third reserve (Greece) Nikolaos Iliopoulos.

=== Floor ===
Nicola Bartolini of Italy won the country's first-ever gold medal on floor, as well as its first World title since Juri Chechi's 1997 win on rings. Silver medalist Kazuki Minami of Japan and bronze medalist Emil Soravuo of Finland also won their first individual World medals. Defending champion Carlos Yulo of the Philippines had a costly out-of-bounds deduction and finished fifth.

Rank	Gymnast	D Score	E Score	Pen.	Total
1st place, gold medalist(s)	(Italy) Nicola Bartolini	6.200	8.600		14.800
2nd place, silver medalist(s)	(Japan) Kazuki Minami	6.500	8.266		14.766
3rd place, bronze medalist(s)	(Finland) Emil Soravuo	6.000	8.700		14.700
4	(South Korea) Ryu Sung-hyun	6.500	8.100		14.600
5	(Philippines) Carlos Yulo	6.600	8.266	–0.3	14.566
6	(Japan) Kazuma Kaya	5.900	8.633		14.533
7	(Kazakhstan) Milad Karimi	6.400	7.933		14.333
8	(United Kingdom) Hayden Skinner	6.500	7.900	–0.3	14.100

- (Japan) Daiki Hashimoto withdrew and was replaced by his compatriot (Japan) Kazuma Kaya who had not qualified due to the two-per-country rule.

=== Pommel horse ===
Stephen Nedoroscik won the United States' first title on pommel horse and the country's first men's title in any event since Danell Leyva won parallel bars in 2011. China's Weng Hao and Kazuma Kaya of Japan tied for the silver medal.

Rank	Gymnast	D Score	E Score	Pen.	Total
1st place, gold medalist(s)	(United States) Stephen Nedoroscik	6.500	8.766		15.266
2nd place, silver medalist(s)	(China) Weng Hao	6.600	8.300		14.900
2nd place, silver medalist(s)	(Japan) Kazuma Kaya	6.600	8.300		14.900
4	(Kazakhstan) Nariman Kurbanov	6.200	8.566		14.766
5	(United States) Alec Yoder	6.500	8.266		14.766
6	(United Kingdom) Joshua Nathan	6.600	8.133		14.733
7	(Croatia) Filip Ude	6.100	7.733		13.833
8	(Armenia) Harutyun Merdinyan	6.200	7.200		13.400

- (Japan) Daiki Hashimoto and first reserve (China) Zhang Boheng withdrew, so second reserve (Armenia) Harutyun Merdinyan took part in the final.

=== Rings ===
Top qualifier Lan Xingyu of China won his first individual World title after previously earning gold as an alternate for the Chinese team in 2018. Marco Lodadio of Italy was called up from first reserve and earned a second consecutive silver on the event, his third World medal overall. Lodadio's teammate Salvatore Maresca and Grigorii Klimentev of RGF tied for the bronze medal, the first individual World medal for both.

Rank	Gymnast	D Score	E Score	Pen.	Total
1st place, gold medalist(s)	(China) Lan Xingyu	6.400	8.800		15.200
2nd place, silver medalist(s)	(Italy) Marco Lodadio	6.300	8.566		14.866
3rd place, bronze medalist(s)	(Italy) Salvatore Maresca	6.200	8.633		14.833
3rd place, bronze medalist(s)	Grigorii Klimentev	6.200	8.633		14.833
5	(Austria) Vinzenz Höck	6.200	8.533		14.733
6	(Turkey) İbrahim Çolak	6.200	8.466		14.666
7	(Canada) William Emard	6.000	8.533		14.533
8	(United Kingdom) Courtney Tulloch	6.200	8.000		14.200

- (China) Zhang Boheng withdrew and was replaced by first reserve (Italy) Marco Lodadio.

=== Vault ===
Rank	Gymnast	Vault 1				Vault 2				Total
Rank	Gymnast	D Score	E Score	Pen.	Score 1	D Score	E Score	Pen.	Score 2	Total
1st place, gold medalist(s)	(Philippines) Carlos Yulo	5.600	9.200		14.800	5.600	9.433		15.033	14.916
2nd place, silver medalist(s)	(Japan) Hidenobu Yonekura	6.000	9.000		15.000	5.600	9.133		14.733	14.866
3rd place, bronze medalist(s)	(Israel) Andrey Medvedev	5.600	8.933		14.533	5.600	9.166		14.766	14.649
4	(Italy) Thomas Grasso	5.600	9.233		14.833	5.200	9.166	–0.1	14.266	14.549
5	(South Korea) Yang Hak-seon	5.600	9.166		14.766	6.000	8.033		14.033	14.399
6	(United Kingdom) Courtney Tulloch	5.600	8.700		14.300	5.600	8.866		14.466	14.383
7	(Ukraine) Nazar Chepurnyi	5.600	9.266		14.866	5.600	7.933	–0.1	13.433	14.149
8	(Canada) William Emard	5.200	8.066		13.266	5.200	7.933		13.133	13.199

=== Parallel bars ===
Rank	Gymnast	D Score	E Score	Pen.	Total
1st place, gold medalist(s)	(China) Hu Xuwei	6.600	8.866		15.466
2nd place, silver medalist(s)	(Philippines) Carlos Yulo	6.400	8.900		15.300
3rd place, bronze medalist(s)	(China) Shi Cong	6.000	9.066		15.066
4	(Japan) Daiki Hashimoto	6.200	8.800		15.000
5	(United States) Yul Moldauer	6.400	8.600		15.000
6	(Japan) Kazuma Kaya	6.300	8.600		14.900
7	(Brazil) Caio Souza	6.100	8.466		14.566
8	(Switzerland) Christian Baumann	6.200	6.133		12.333

- (China) Zhang Boheng withdrew and was replaced by his compatriot (China) Shi Cong who had not qualified due to the two-per-country rule.

=== Horizontal bar ===
Rank	Gymnast	D Score	E Score	Pen.	Total
1	(China) Hu Xuwei	6.700	8.466		15.166
2	(Japan) Daiki Hashimoto	6.500	8.566		15.066
3	(United States) Brody Malone	6.500	8.466		14.966
4	(Italy) Carlo Macchini	6.700	8.266		14.966
5	(Kazakhstan) Milad Karimi	6.400	8.433		14.833
6	(Japan) Kōhei Uchimura	6.600	8.000		14.600
7	(Ukraine) Illia Kovtun	6.000	8.166		14.166
8	(Cyprus) Ilias Georgiou	5.800	7.866		13.666

== Women's results ==
=== Individual all-around ===
Angelina Melnikova (RGF) became the first non-American to win a World or Olympic all-around title since her Russian teammate Aliya Mustafina did so at the 2010 World Championships. Americans Leanne Wong and Kayla DiCello won the silver and bronze medals, respectively, the first individual World medal for both.

Rank	Gymnast	Vault (gymnastics)	Uneven bars	Balance beam	Floor (gymnastics)	Total
1st place, gold medalist(s)	Angelina Melnikova	14.466	14.533	13.800	13.833	56.632
2nd place, silver medalist(s)	(United States) Leanne Wong	14.341	14.066	13.900	14.033	56.340
3rd place, bronze medalist(s)	(United States) Kayla DiCello	14.600	12.766	13.400	13.800	54.566
4	Vladislava Urazova	13.566	14.333	12.333	13.366	53.598
5	(Netherlands) Naomi Visser	13.400	13.800	12.966	12.666	52.832
6	(China) Wei Xiaoyuan	13.200	14.733	13.733	12.400	54.066
7	(Portugal) Filipa Martins	13.466	13.000	12.933	12.800	52.199
8	(Italy) Alice D'Amato	14.400	12.916	11.766	13.000	52.082
9	(France) Carolann Héduit	14.266	12.533	12.633	12.533	51.965
10	(Ukraine) Anastasiia Bachynska	13.533	12.800	12.800	12.700	51.833
11	(South Korea) Shin Sol-yi	13.500	12.900	12.766	12.600	51.766
12	(Italy) Asia D'Amato	14.366	12.600	11.900	12.833	51.699
13	(South Korea) Lee Yun-seo	13.033	13.566	12.100	13.000	51.699
14	(Ukraine) Yelyzaveta Hubareva	13.200	13.100	12.733	12.566	51.599
15	(United Kingdom) Ruby Stacey	13.500	13.433	12.600	11.900	51.333
16	(Romania) Maria Ceplinschi	13.633	12.566	11.633	13.066	50.898
17	(United Kingdom) Georgia-Mae Fenton	14.333	11.400	12.566	12.000	50.299
18	(Canada) Rose Woo	13.400	12.166	11.700	12.933	50.299
19	(Republic of Ireland) Emma Slevin	13.600	12.533	12.733	11.266	50.132
20	(France) Célia Serber	13.900	13.200	10.300	12.333	49.733
21	(Hungary) Csenge Bácskay	13.666	11.366	11.700	11.933	48.665
22	(Austria) Marlies Männersdorfer	12.666	13.200	11.566	12.200	48.598
23	(Sweden) Jennifer Williams	13.333	10.733	12.066	12.100	48.232
24	(Switzerland) Stefanie Siegenthaler	11.700	11.433	12.166	11.133	46.432

- (Japan) Hitomi Hatakeda withdrew due to a neck and spinal cord injury suffered in practice. She was replaced in the first rotation group by first reserve (Hungary) Csenge Bácskay.

=== Vault ===
Reigning Olympic champion Rebeca Andrade of Brazil won the title for her first individual World medal. Silver medalist Asia D'Amato is the first Italian female artistic gymnast to ever qualify for a World vault final. Angelina Melnikova (RGF)'s bronze was her second individual medal at the World Championships following the all-around title.

Position	Gymnast	Vault 1				Vault 2				Total
Position	Gymnast	D Score	E Score	Pen.	Score 1	D Score	E Score	Pen.	Score 2	Total
1st place, gold medalist(s)	(Brazil) Rebeca Andrade	6.000	9.133		15.133	5.400	9.400		14.800	14.966
2nd place, silver medalist(s)	(Italy) Asia D'Amato	5.400	8.733		14.133	5.200	8.833		14.033	14.083
3rd place, bronze medalist(s)	Angelina Melnikova	5.400	9.033		14.433	4.800	8.700		13.500	13.966
4	(Egypt) Nancy Taman	5.400	8.733		14.133	4.600	8.733		13.333	13.733
5	(Hungary) Csenge Bácskay	5.000	8.866		13.866	4.800	8.800		13.600	13.733
6	(Israel) Ofir Netzer	4.800	8.833		13.633	4.800	8.800		13.600	13.616
7	(Mexico) Natalia Escalera	5.000	8.466	–0.1	13.366	4.800	8.800		13.600	13.483
8	(Netherlands) Elze Geurts	5.400	8.966		14.366	4.800	7.533		12.333	13.349

=== Uneven bars ===
Wei Xiaoyuan won the title for her first individual World medal and China's first medal on the event since winning four titles in a row from 2013 to 2017 (tie in 2015). Top qualifier Rebeca Andrade of Brazil earned the silver for her second individual medal of the day. Wei's teammate Luo Rui finished in bronze after losing a tiebreaker to Andrade.

Rank	Gymnast	D Score	E Score	Pen.	Total
1st place, gold medalist(s)	(China) Wei Xiaoyuan	6.500	8.233		14.733
2nd place, silver medalist(s)	(Brazil) Rebeca Andrade	5.900	8.733		14.633
3rd place, bronze medalist(s)	(China) Luo Rui	6.200	8.433		14.633
4	Angelina Melnikova	6.100	8.433		14.533
5	(Hungary) Zsófia Kovács	6.200	8.266		14.466
6	(Italy) Elisa Iorio	6.200	8.200		14.400
7	Vladislava Urazova	6.300	8.100		14.400
8	(Portugal) Filipa Martins	6.000	8.066		14.066

=== Balance beam ===
Rank	Gymnast	D Score	E Score	Pen.	Total
1st place, gold medalist(s)	(Japan) Urara Ashikawa	5.900	8.200		14.100
2nd place, silver medalist(s)	(Germany) Pauline Schäfer-Betz	5.400	8.400		13.800
3rd place, bronze medalist(s)	(Japan) Mai Murakami	5.800	7.933		13.733
4	(United States) Leanne Wong	5.500	7.833		13.333
5	(China) Luo Rui	5.800	7.500		13.300
6	(Brazil) Rebeca Andrade	5.400	7.100		12.500
7	Angelina Melnikova	5.400	7.000		12.400
8	(United States) Kayla DiCello	4.900	6.966		11.866
9	Yana Vorona	5.200	6.633		11.833

=== Floor ===
Rank	Gymnast	D Score	E Score	Pen.	Total
1st place, gold medalist(s)	(Japan) Mai Murakami	5.800	8.266		14.066
2nd place, silver medalist(s)	Angelina Melnikova	5.600	8.400		14.000
3rd place, bronze medalist(s)	(United States) Leanne Wong	5.700	8.133		13.833
4	Vladislava Urazova	5.300	8.400		13.700
5	(United States) Kayla DiCello	5.400	8.233		13.633
6	(Romania) Maria Ceplinschi	5.200	8.166		13.366
7	(Ukraine) Anastasiia Bachynska	5.100	7.933		13.033
8	(Japan) Yuna Hiraiwa	5.100	7.033		12.133

== Qualification ==
=== Men's results ===
Subdivision 6 of the men's qualification was delayed 90 minutes while the equipment was disinfected after a Colombian gymnast, later revealed to be Jossimar Calvo, in the previous subdivision tested positive for COVID-19. Calvo subsequently withdrew from the all-around final.

==== Individual all-around ====
Rank	Gymnast	Floor (gymnastics)	Pommel horse	Rings (gymnastics)	Vault (gymnastics)	Parallel bars	Horizontal bar	Total	Qual.
1	(Japan) Daiki Hashimoto	14.733	15.075	13.333	15.066	15.200	14.633	88.040	Q
2	(China) Zhang Boheng	14.133	14.666	14.866	14.766	15.300	14.166	87.897	Q
3	(Turkey) Adem Asil	14.066	12.666	14.533	14.966	14.366	13.833	84.430	Q
4	(China) Shi Cong	13.200	13.466	13.933	14.233	15.200	13.866	83.898	Q
5	(Ukraine) Illia Kovtun	14.333	13.766	12.500	14.066	14.700	14.200	83.565	Q
6	(Hungary) Krisztofer Mészáros	14.033	13.600	12.933	14.200	14.566	13.300	82.632	Q
7	(Cyprus) Ilias Georgiou	13.633	11.866	13.500	14.366	14.766	14.233	82.364	Q
8	(Turkey) Ahmet Önder	13.400	12.866	13.933	14.200	14.700	12.966	82.065	Q
9	(Spain) Joel Plata	14.133	13.633	13.300	14.066	13.666	13.100	81.898	Q
10	(Lithuania) Robert Tvorogal	13.433	13.233	13.100	13.800	14.600	13.600	81.766	Q
11	(Canada) William Emard	13.900	11.233	14.733	14.666	13.833	13.133	81.498	Q
12	(Belgium) Luka van den Keybus	13.966	12.700	12.433	14.333	14.000	13.666	81.098	Q
13	(United States) Yul Moldauer	14.433	10.633	13.466	14.433	14.866	13.233	81.064	Q
14	(Switzerland) Henji Mboyo	13.100	12.966	13.333	13.833	13.933	13.800	80.965	Q
15	(United Kingdom) Joshua Nathan	13.433	15.033	12.600	14.400	12.133	13.166	80.765	Q
16	(Kazakhstan) Milad Karimi	14.941	11.600	12.133	12.966	14.633	14.433	80.706	Q
17	(Brazil) Caio Souza	13.666	10.233	14.033	14.666	14.800	13.200	80.598	Q
18	(Spain) Néstor Abad	14.233	12.933	13.466	13.800	13.566	12.500	80.498	Q
19	(Norway) Sofus Heggemsnes	12.966	13.366	13.000	14.233	13.933	13.300	80.498	Q
20	(Colombia) Jossimar Calvo	13.300	13.433	12.300	14.300	13.866	12.866	80.065	Q
21	(Finland) Oskar Kirmes	13.733	12.766	12.200	13.766	13.933	12.900	79.298	Q
22	(Israel) Eyal Indig	12.600	14.066	12.400	13.933	13.500	12.600	79.099	Q
23	Nikita Ignatyev	12.366	11.866	12.766	14.008	13.500	13.433	77.939	Q
24	(Belgium) Noah Kuavita	13.600	12.500	11.966	14.200	11.300	14.066	77.632	Q
25	(Austria) Alexander Benda	12.566	12.666	12.600	13.766	12.633	13.366	77.597	R1
26	(Finland) Robert Kirmes	13.733	13.500	12.666	13.933	11.966	11.766	77.564	R2
27	(Greece) Nikolaos Iliopoulos	12.500	11.666	13.133	13.766	13.533	12.833	77.431	R3
28	(Colombia) Andrés Martínez	13.866	13.533	10.933	13.833	13.100	12.133	77.398	R4

==== Floor ====
Rank	Gymnast	D Score	E Score	Pen.	Total	Qual.
1	(Philippines) Carlos Yulo	6.600	8.566		15.166	Q
2	(Italy) Nicola Bartolini	6.200	8.766		14.966	Q
3	(Japan) Kazuki Minami	6.500	8.466		14.966	Q
4	(Kazakhstan) Milad Karimi	6.400	8.541		14.941	Q
5	(Japan) Daiki Hashimoto	6.000	8.733		14.733	Q
6	(South Korea) Ryu Sung-hyun	6.500	8.100		14.600	Q
7	(Japan) Kazuma Kaya	5.900	8.666		14.566	–
8	(United Kingdom) Hayden Skinner	6.500	8.066		14.566	Q
9	(Finland) Emil Soravuo	6.000	8.533		14.533	Q
10	(United States) Yul Moldauer	5.800	8.633		14.433	R1
11	(Ukraine) Illia Kovtun	5.900	8.433		14.333	R2
12	Ivan Stretovich	5.800	8.466		14.266	R3

==== Pommel horse ====
Rank	Gymnast	D Score	E Score	Pen.	Total	Qual.
1	(China) Weng Hao	6.600	9.000		15.600	Q
2	(United States) Stephen Nedoroscik	6.500	8.866		15.366	Q
3	(United States) Alec Yoder	6.500	8.800		15.300	Q
4	(Japan) Daiki Hashimoto	6.400	8.675		15.075	Q
5	(United Kingdom) Joshua Nathan	6.600	8.433		15.033	Q
6	(Kazakhstan) Nariman Kurbanov	6.200	8.800		15.000	Q
7	(Japan) Kazuma Kaya	6.600	8.333		14.933	Q
8	(Croatia) Filip Ude	6.000	8.866		14.866	Q
9	(China) Zhang Boheng	5.800	8.866		14.666	R1
10	(Armenia) Harutyun Merdinyan	6.200	8.466		14.666	R2
11	(Netherlands) Loran de Munck	6.300	8.266		14.566	R3

==== Rings ====
Rank	Gymnast	D Score	E Score	Pen.	Total	Qual.
1	(China) Lan Xingyu	6.400	8.866		15.266	Q
2	(China) Zhang Boheng	6.100	8.766		14.866	Q
3	(Austria) Vinzenz Höck	6.200	8.566		14.766	Q
3	Grigorii Klimentev	6.200	8.566		14.766	Q
3	(Turkey) İbrahim Çolak	6.200	8.566		14.766	Q
6	(Canada) William Emard	6.000	8.733		14.733	Q
7	(United Kingdom) Courtney Tulloch	6.200	8.466		14.666	Q
7	(Italy) Salvatore Maresca	6.200	8.466		14.666	Q
9	(Italy) Marco Lodadio	6.300	8.300		14.600	R1
10	(Turkey) Adem Asil	6.200	8.333		14.533	R2
11	(Egypt) Ali Zahran	6.200	8.033		14.233	R3

==== Vault ====
Rank	Gymnast	Vault 1				Vault 2				Total	Qual.
Rank	Gymnast	D Score	E Score	Pen.	Score 1	D Score	E Score	Pen.	Score 2	Total	Qual.
1	(Ukraine) Nazar Chepurnyi	5.600	9.366		14.966	5.600	9.100		14.700	14.833	Q
2	(South Korea) Yang Hak-seon	6.000	9.033	–0.1	14.933	5.600	9.133		14.733	14.833	Q
3	(Philippines) Carlos Yulo	5.600	9.133		14.733	5.600	9.283		14.883	14.808	Q
4	(Japan) Hidenobu Yonekura	6.000	8.933		14.933	5.600	9.033		14.633	14.783	Q
5	(Israel) Andrey Medvedev	5.600	9.000		14.600	5.600	9.233		14.833	14.716	Q
6	(Italy) Thomas Grasso	5.600	9.233		14.833	5.200	9.166		14.366	14.599	Q
7	(United Kingdom) Courtney Tulloch	5.600	8.933		14.533	5.600	9.000		14.600	14.566	Q
8	(Canada) William Emard	5.200	9.466		14.666	5.200	9.200		14.400	14.533	Q
9	(Turkey) Adem Asil	6.000	8.966		14.966	5.600	8.733	–0.3	14.033	14.499	R2
10	(Italy) Nicola Bartolini	5.200	9.500		14.700	4.800	9.366		14.166	14.433	R2
11	Mukhammadzhon Iakubov	5.600	8.633	–0.1	14.133	5.600	9.100		14.700	14.416	R3

==== Parallel bars ====
Rank	Gymnast	D Score	E Score	Pen.	Total	Qual.
1	(Philippines) Carlos Yulo	6.400	9.166		15.566	Q
2	(China) Zhang Boheng	6.100	9.200		15.300	Q
3	(China) Hu Xuwei	6.300	8.933		15.233	Q
4	(China) Shi Cong	6.000	9.200		15.200	–
5	(Japan) Daiki Hashimoto	6.200	9.000		15.200	Q
6	(United States) Yul Moldauer	6.400	8.466		14.866	Q
7	(Switzerland) Christian Baumann	6.400	8.441		14.841	Q
8	(Japan) Kazuma Kaya	6.300	8.533		14.833	Q
9	(Brazil) Caio Souza	6.100	8.700		14.800	Q
10	(Cyprus) Marios Georgiou	6.300	8.500		14.800	R1
11	(Cyprus) Ilias Georgiou	5.600	9.166		14.766	R2
12	(Mexico) Isaac Núñez	6.100	8.633		14.733	R3

==== Horizontal bar ====
Rank	Gymnast	D Score	E Score	Pen.	Total	Qual.
1	(Japan) Daiki Hashimoto	6.500	8.133		14.633	Q
2	(China) Hu Xuwei	6.400	8.133		14.533	Q
3	(Kazakhstan) Milad Karimi	6.400	8.033		14.433	Q
4	(United States) Brody Malone	6.500	7.866		14.366	Q
5	(Japan) Kōhei Uchimura	6.300	8.000		14.300	Q
6	(Italy) Carlo Macchini	6.300	7.966		14.266	Q
7	(Cyprus) Ilias Georgiou	5.800	8.433		14.233	Q
8	(Ukraine) Illia Kovtun	6.200	8.000		14.200	Q
9	(China) Zhang Boheng	6.200	7.966		14.166	R1
10	(Germany) Andreas Bretschneider	6.200	7.900		14.100	R2
11	(Belgium) Noah Kuavita	6.000	8.066		14.066	R3

=== Women's results ===
==== Individual all-around ====
Rank	Gymnast	Vault (gymnastics)	Uneven bars	Balance beam	Floor (gymnastics)	Total	Qual.
1	Angelina Melnikova	14.466	14.466	14.033	14.100	57.065	Q
2	(United States) Leanne Wong	14.366	13.683	13.700	14.000	55.749	Q
3	(United States) Kayla DiCello	14.500	13.900	13.500	13.800	55.700	Q
4	(Japan) Hitomi Hatakeda	13.566	13.933	12.966	13.333	53.798	Q
5	Vladislava Urazova	12.100	14.366	13.166	13.433	53.065	Q
6	(Portugal) Filipa Martins	13.300	14.133	12.666	12.933	53.032	Q
7	(China) Wei Xiaoyuan	13.266	14.733	12.633	12.233	52.865	Q
8	(France) Carolann Héduit	14.300	13.366	12.366	12.733	52.765	Q
9	(Ukraine) Anastasiia Bachynska	13.566	13.333	12.666	13.100	52.665	Q
10	(South Korea) Lee Yun-seo	13.258	14.066	12.200	13.016	52.540	Q
11	(Netherlands) Naomi Visser	13.533	13.033	12.800	12.900	52.266	Q
12	(Italy) Asia D'Amato	14.133	12.333	13.000	12.633	52.099	Q
13	(Italy) Alice D'Amato	14.333	13.966	10.966	12.833	52.098	Q
14	(South Korea) Shin Sol-yi	13.500	12.600	12.200	13.100	51.400	Q
15	(Ukraine) Yelyzaveta Hubareva	13.033	13.066	12.633	12.533	51.265	Q
16	(United Kingdom) Ruby Stacey	13.266	13.200	12.333	11.966	50.765	Q
17	(United Kingdom) Georgia-Mae Fenton	13.566	13.658	11.733	11.733	50.690	Q
18	(France) Célia Serber	13.633	13.200	10.933	12.733	50.499	Q
19	(Canada) Rose Woo	13.266	12.800	12.000	12.400	50.466	Q
20	(Romania) Maria Ceplinschi	13.700	12.333	11.066	13.300	50.399	Q
21	(Republic of Ireland) Emma Slevin	13.533	12.700	11.466	12.466	50.165	Q
22	(Sweden) Jennifer Williams	13.433	12.666	11.233	12.700	50.032	Q
23	(Switzerland) Stefanie Siegenthaler	13.166	11.666	11.566	12.466	48.864	Q
24	(Austria) Marlies Männersdorfer	12.466	12.466	11.700	12.166	48.798	Q
25	(Hungary) Csenge Bácskay	13.866	11.566	11.966	11.300	48.698	R1
26	(Hungary) Zója Székely	13.066	12.400	11.133	11.966	48.565	R2
27	(Finland) Ada Hautala	12.966	12.033	10.966	12.466	48.431	R3
28	(Netherlands) Vera van Pol	13.433	10.033	12.216	12.733	48.415	R4

==== Vault ====
Rank	Gymnast	Vault 1				Vault 2				Total	Qual.
Rank	Gymnast	D Score	E Score	Pen.	Score 1	D Score	E Score	Pen.	Score 2	Total	Qual.
1	(Brazil) Rebeca Andrade	6.000	9.200	–0.3	14.900	5.400	9.300		14.700	14.800	Q
2	(Netherlands) Elze Geurts	5.400	9.000		14.400	5.400	8.900		14.300	14.350	Q
3	(Italy) Asia D'Amato	5.400	8.733		14.133	4.800	8.700		13.500	13.816	Q
4	Angelina Melnikova	5.400	9.066		14.466	4.800	8.600	–0.3	13.100	13.783	Q
5	(Hungary) Csenge Bácskay	5.000	8.866		13.866	4.800	8.666		13.466	13.666	Q
6	(Mexico) Natalia Escalera	5.000	8.800	–0.1	13.700	4.800	8.766		13.566	13.633	Q
7	(Egypt) Nancy Taman	5.400	8.466	–0.1	13.766	4.600	8.700		13.300	13.533	Q
8	(Israel) Ofir Netzer	4.800	8.666		13.466	4.800	8.766		13.566	13.516	Q
9	(Canada) Audrey Rousseau	5.000	8.866		13.866	4.600	8.633	–0.1	13.133	13.499	R1
10	(France) Coline Devillard	5.800	7.400		13.200	5.400	8.300		13.700	13.450	R2
11	(India) Aruna Budda Reddy	4.600	8.541		13.141	4.800	8.766		13.566	13.353	R3

==== Uneven bars ====
Rank	Gymnast	D Score	E Score	Pen.	Total	Qual.
1	(Brazil) Rebeca Andrade	6.300	8.800		15.100	Q
2	(China) Wei Xiaoyuan	6.500	8.233		14.733	Q
3	(China) Luo Rui	6.200	8.300		14.500	Q
4	Angelina Melnikova	6.300	8.166		14.466	Q
5	(Hungary) Zsófia Kovács	6.200	8.233		14.433	Q
6	Vladislava Urazova	6.100	8.266		14.366	Q
7	Maria Minaeva	6.100	8.233		14.333	–
8	(Italy) Elisa Iorio	6.200	7.983		14.183	Q
9	(Portugal) Filipa Martins	6.000	8.133		14.133	Q
10	(South Korea) Lee Yun-seo	6.300	7.766		14.066	R1
11	(United Kingdom) Becky Downie	6.200	7.800		14.000	R2
12	(Italy) Alice D'Amato	5.900	8.066		13.966	R3

==== Balance beam ====
Rank	Gymnast	D Score	E Score	Pen.	Total	Qual.
1	(China) Luo Rui	6.100	8.466		14.566	Q
2	Angelina Melnikova	5.600	8.433		14.033	Q
3	(Germany) Pauline Schäfer-Betz	5.400	8.333		13.733	Q
4	(United States) Leanne Wong	5.400	8.300		13.700	Q
5	Yana Vorona	5.700	7.933		13.633	Q
6	(Japan) Urara Ashikawa	5.900	7.633		13.533	Q
7	(United States) Kayla DiCello	5.600	7.900		13.500	Q
8	(United States) Konnor McClain	5.900	7.566		13.466	–
9	(Brazil) Rebeca Andrade	5.600	7.800		13.400	Q
9	(Japan) Mai Murakami	5.600	7.800		13.400	Q
11	(United Kingdom) Becky Downie	5.600	7.733		13.333	R1
12	Vladislava Urazova	5.100	8.066		13.166	–
13	(Italy) Elisa Iorio	5.100	8.000		13.100	R2
14	(Italy) Asia D'Amato	5.300	7.700		13.000	R3

==== Floor ====
Rank	Gymnast	D Score	E Score	Pen.	Total	Qual.
1	(Japan) Mai Murakami	5.800	8.366		14.166	Q
2	Angelina Melnikova	5.800	8.300		14.100	Q
3	(United States) Leanne Wong	5.700	8.300		14.000	Q
4	(United States) Kayla DiCello	5.400	8.400		13.800	Q
5	Vladislava Urazova	5.200	8.333	–0.1	13.433	Q
6	(Japan) Yuna Hiraiwa	5.100	8.300		13.400	Q
7	(Japan) Hitomi Hatakeda	5.300	8.033		13.333	–
8	(Romania) Maria Ceplinschi	5.300	8.000		13.300	Q
9	(United States) Emjae Frazier	5.500	7.666		13.166	–
10	(Ukraine) Anastasiia Bachynska	5.100	8.000		13.100	Q
11	(South Korea) Shin Sol-yi	5.300	7.800		13.100	R1
12	(South Korea) Lee Yun-seo	5.100	7.916		13.016	R2
13	(Netherlands) Elze Geurts	5.200	7.766		12.966	R3

== Participating nations ==
- Albania (1)
- Armenia (3)
- Austria (8)
- Azerbaijan (4)
- Belarus (2)
- Belgium (3)
- Brazil (3)
- Bulgaria (3)
- Canada (10)
- China (10)
- Chinese Taipei (8)
- Colombia (9)
- Croatia (6)
- Cyprus (2)
- Czech Republic (4)
- Denmark (3)
- Ecuador (2)
- Egypt (10)
- Finland (7)
- France (4)
- Germany (6)
- Great Britain (9)
- Greece (6)
- Hong Kong (4)
- Hungary (9)
- Iceland (8)
- India (6)
- Ireland (2)
- Israel (6)
- Italy (10)
- Japan (10) (Host)
- Kazakhstan (5)
- Latvia (2)
- Lithuania (4)
- Luxembourg (1)
- Mexico (9)
- Netherlands (8)
- Norway (6)
- Panama (1)
- Philippines (1)
- Portugal (6)
- RGF (10)
- Romania (2)
- Saudi Arabia (2)
- Slovakia (3)
- Slovenia (3)
- South Korea (10)
- Spain (5)
- Sweden (6)
- Switzerland (9)
- Syria (1)
- Thailand (2)
- Turkey (8)
- Ukraine (10)
- United States (10)
- Vietnam (6)
