= Yukio Endō =

Japanese gymnast (1937–2009)

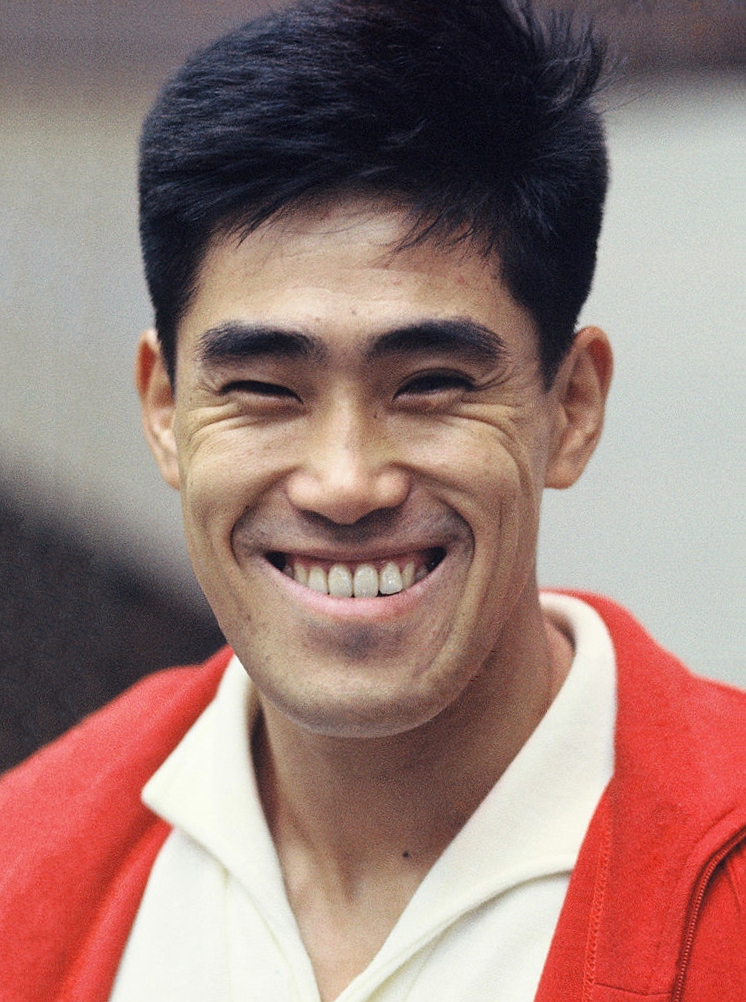
- Endō at the 1964 Olympics

Personal information
- Born: January 18, 1937 Yanaisado, Hiroomote, Akita-ken, Japan
- Died: March 25, 2009 (aged 72) Surugadai Nihon University Hospital, Chiyoda-ku, Tokyo
- Height: 1.61 m (5 ft 3 in)

Gymnastics career
- Discipline: Men's artistic gymnastics
- Country represented: Japan
Medal record
Olympic Games
Gold medal – first place	1960 Rome	Team
Gold medal – first place	1964 Tokyo	All-around
Gold medal – first place	1964 Tokyo	Parallel bars
Gold medal – first place	1964 Tokyo	Team
Gold medal – first place	1968 Mexico City	Team
Silver medal – second place	1964 Tokyo	Floor exercise
Silver medal – second place	1968 Mexico City	Vault
World Artistic Gymnastics Championships
Gold medal – first place	1962 Prague	Team
Gold medal – first place	1962 Prague	Floor
Gold medal – first place	1966 Dortmund	Team
Silver medal – second place	1962 Prague	Individual all-around
Silver medal – second place	1962 Prague	Rings
Silver medal – second place	1962 Prague	Horizontal Bar
Silver medal – second place	1966 Dortmund	Floor
Silver medal – second place	1966 Dortmund	Horizontal Bar
Bronze medal – third place	1962 Prague	Parallel Bar

Yukio Endō (遠藤 幸雄, Endō Yukio; January 18, 1937 – March 25, 2009) was a Japanese artistic gymnast, Olympic champion and world champion. He was part of the first Japanese team that succeeded to win gold medals in the team event at the Summer Olympics (1960) and World Championships (1962). In 1964 he won the first individual all-around Olympic gold medal for Japan. He was the flag bearer at the 1968 Summer Olympics.

== Early life ==
Endō was born into a family of pharmacists. His mother died from tuberculosis when he was a nine-year-old student at Hiroomote Elementary School. He studied at Kubota Junior High School and Akita Technical High School, after which he studied at the Tokyo University of Education (now the University of Tsukuba), graduating in 1959. He later worked as assistant instructor of physical education at Nihon University.

== Career ==
Endō won gold medals with the Japanese team in three Olympics, in 1960, 1964 and 1968. At the 1964 Summer Olympics in Tokyo, he also received two individual gold medals, in parallel bars, and in individual all-around.

Endō received six individual medals at the 1962 World Artistic Gymnastics Championships, including a gold medal in floor exercise, and Japan also won the team competition.

He received two individual silver medals at the 1966 World Artistic Gymnastics Championships, and Japan won the team competition.

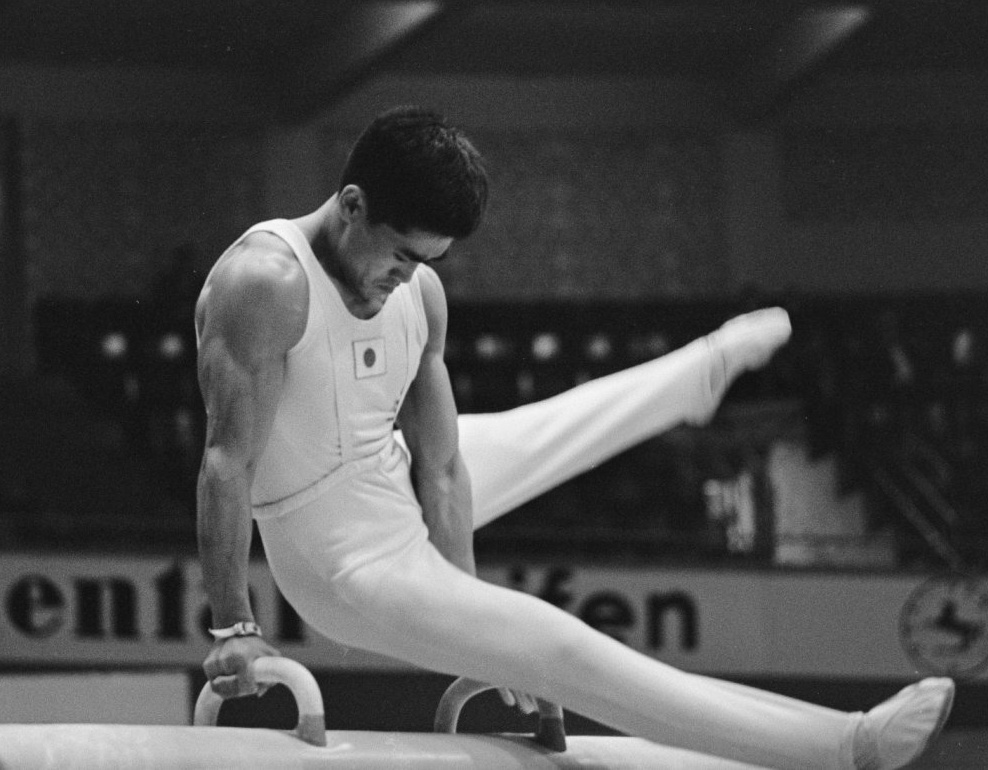
Endō in 1966

Endō was a four-time Japanese all-around champion.

He retired after the 1968 Olympics to become a gymnastics coach and eventually professor at Nihon University. He also coached the national team at the 1972 Olympics, acted as director of the Japanese Olympic Committee and was twice appointed as vice-president of the Japan Gymnastic Association. In 1996, he received the Japanese Emperor's Medal, and in 1999 he was inducted into the International Gymnastics Hall of Fame.

Endō died of esophageal cancer on March 25, 2009.

== See also ==
- List of multiple Olympic gold medalists
