= Kumagai =

Kumagai (written: 熊谷 lit. "bear valley"), also transliterated as Kumagae, is a Japanese surname. Notable people with the surname include:

- Andrew Kumagai (熊谷 アンドリュー; born 1993), Japanese footballer
- Goro Kumagai (熊谷吾良, 1932–2017), Japanese printmaker, educator
- Hitori Kumagai (熊谷 独; born 1936), Japanese writer
- Ichiya Kumagae (熊谷 一弥; 1890–1968), Japanese tennis player
- Koji Kumagai (熊谷 浩二; born 1975), Japanese footballer
- Mami Kumagai (熊谷 真実; born 1960), Japanese actress
- Masahiko Kumagai (熊谷 雅彦; born 1975), Japanese footballer
- Mie Kumagai, Japanese video game producer
- Motoichi Kumagai (熊谷 元一; 1909–2010), Japanese photographer
- Naoko Kumagai (熊谷 直子; born 1971), Japanese kickboxer
- Kumagai Naozane (熊谷 次郎 直実; 1141–1207/1208), Japanese soldier
- Noriaki Kumagai (born 1970), Japanese drummer
- Saki Kumagai (熊谷 紗希; born 1990), Japanese footballer who plays in the English, Women's Super League
- Seiji Kumagai (熊谷 誠二; born 1967), Japanese voice actor
- Kentarou Kumagai (熊谷 健太郎; born 1994), Japanese voice actor

Fictional characters:

- Kumagai (熊谷), character in the manga series Binbō-gami ga!

== See also ==
- Kumagai-shuku (熊谷宿, Kumagai-shuku), eighth of the sixty-nine stations of the Nakasendō
- Kumagai Gumi, Japanese construction company
