= 2015 Asian Artistic Gymnastics Championships =

International gymnastics competition

- Host city: Hiroshima, Japan
- Dates: 31 July – 2 August 2015
- Main venue: Hiroshima Prefectural Sports Center

The 2015 Asian Artistic Gymnastics Championships were the 6th edition of the Asian Artistic Gymnastics Championships, and were held in Hiroshima, Japan from July 31 to August 2, 2015.

== Medal summary ==
=== Men ===
Event	Gold	Silver	Bronze
Team	Japan; Naoto Hayasaka; Yusuke Tanaka; Ryohei Kato; Kazuma Kaya; Koji Yamamuro; Kenzō Shirai	China; Ji Lianshen; He Youxiao; Zhu Xiaodong; Wu Di; Sun Wei; Xiao Ruoteng	South Korea; Yoo Won-chul; Lee Sang-wook; Shin Dong-hyen; Jo Yeong-gwang; Kim Han-sol; Lee Jun-ho
Individual all-around	Ryohei Kato; Japan	Yusuke Tanaka; Japan	He Youxiao; China
Floor	Kenzō Shirai; Japan	Naoto Hayasaka; Japan	Eduard Shaulov; Uzbekistan
Pommel horse	Kazuma Kaya; Japan	Xiao Ruoteng; China	Abdollah Jameei; Iran
Rings	Koji Yamamuro; Japan	Chen Chih-yu; Chinese Taipei	Hadi Khanarinejad; Iran
Vault	Shek Wai Hung; Hong Kong	Kenzō Shirai; Japan	Kim Han-sol; South Korea
Parallel bars	He Youxiao; China	Zhu Xiaodong; China	Kazuma Kaya; Japan
Horizontal bar	Yusuke Tanaka; Japan	Shek Wai Hung; Hong Kong	Lee Jun-ho; South Korea

=== Women ===
Event	Gold	Silver	Bronze
Team	Japan; Aiko Sugihara; Natsumi Sasada; Asuka Teramoto; Sakura Yumoto; Yuki Uchiyama; Sae Miyakawa	China; Wang Yan; Mao Yi; Fan Yilin; Chen Siyi; Zhu Xiaofang; Xie Yufen	South Korea; Eum Da-yeon; Heo Seon-mi; Jeong Hee-yeon; Lee Hye-been; Kim Chae-yeon; Lee Eun-ju
Individual all-around	Aiko Sugihara; Japan	Wang Yan; China	Asuka Teramoto; Japan
Vault	Wang Yan; China	Sae Miyakawa; Japan	Dipa Karmakar; India
Uneven bars	Zhu Xiaofang; China	Aiko Sugihara; Japan	Fan Yilin; China
Balance beam	Fan Yilin; China	Asuka Teramoto; Japan	Wang Yan; China
Floor	Wang Yan; China	Aiko Sugihara; Japan	Sae Miyakawa; Japan

== Medal table ==
Rank	Nation	Gold	Silver	Bronze	Total
1	Japan	8	7	3	18
2	China	5	5	3	13
3	Hong Kong	1	1	0	2
4	Chinese Taipei	0	1	0	1
5	South Korea	0	0	4	4
6	Iran	0	0	2	2
7	India	0	0	1	1
7	Uzbekistan	0	0	1	1
Totals (8 entries)		14	14	14	42

== Participating nations ==
116 athletes from 16 nations competed.

- China (12)
- Chinese Taipei (10)
- Hong Kong (10)
- India (5)
- Indonesia (6)
- Iran (3)
- Japan (12)
- Jordan (1)
- Kazakhstan (12)
- Malaysia (8)
- Qatar (1)
- Singapore (4)
- South Korea (12)
- Thailand (9)
- Uzbekistan (4)
- Vietnam (7)
