= Taiyō to Ciscomoon =

Japanese girl group

- Taiyō to Ciscomoon, 1999; Miho Shinoda, Atsuko Inaba, Miwa Kominato, Ruru Honda

Background information
- Also known as: T&C Bomber
- Origin: Tokyo, Japan
- Genres: pop
- Years active: 1999–2000,2009,2013,2015,2018–2019
- Label: Zetima
- Past members: Atsuko Inaba; Miho Shinoda; Ruru Honda; Miwa Kominato

Taiyō to Ciscomoon (太陽とシスコムーン), later known as T&C Bomber (T&Cボンバー), was a Japanese girl group under Hello! Project that debuted in April 1999. They released multiple singles and two albums before disbanding in late 2000.

== History ==
The group consisted of four members: Atsuko Inaba (稲葉貴子), born March 13, 1974, in Osaka; Miho Shinoda (信田美帆), born May 18, 1972, in Tokyo; Ruru Honda (本多RURU), born March 18, 1976, in Shenyang, Liaoning, China; and Miwa Kominato (小湊美和), born February 15, 1977, in Fukushima Prefecture. The group was created under the name Taiyō to Ciscomoon ("Sun and Ciscomoon"), but changed their name to T&C Bomber in March 2000. The group disbanded the same year after a final performance in Osaka, on October 9, 2000.

The band reformed in early 2009, after one of the group's former members posted a blog entry suggesting a reformation for a limited time to celebrate the group's ten-year anniversary, and the release of their new greatest hits album. Their first official reunion was on January 9, 2009, in Shibuya. In March of that year, the group called for fans to sign a petition for a 10th anniversary live performance. In 2 months, the petition received more than 2,200 signatures. Their final live performance took place in October; however, Ruru did not take part in the performance due to scheduling conflicts with her live concerts in Japan. Afterwards, the group's official blog was ended, though it was not taken down and was occasionally updated with information about the members (though has since been removed from the Oricon site).

In 2013, Up-Front Works confirmed that they will reform (minus RuRu) for a concert at Hello! Project's New Year's Eve concert.

In 2015, they reunited again for a concert in Japan again, this time with RuRu for the first time since their disbandment.

== Post-T&C Bomber Careers ==
Miho Shinoda (信田 美帆)
Shinoda has since appeared in various sports programmes, and served as a commentator on the women's gymnastics events at the 2004 Athens Olympics.
Atsuko Inaba
After the group split up, the only artist to remain signed with Hello! Project was Atsuko Inaba. She continued performing as a dancer, and appeared in the chorus of various songs over the next nine years; however, her contract with UpFront Agency was terminated in late 2009, after both Inaba and the management decided that her career would go no further with Hello! Project—Inaba also stated that she would "like to see the world from a different angle" after being a performer for so long.
RuRu (ルル)
Renamed Ruru Honda (本多 RURU) within the group by Tsunku, she used this name officially after getting Japanese citizenship. Ruru pursued a singing career in Taiwan. She returned to Japan in 2007 with her debut solo album, "Shoshin" (初心).
Miwa Kominato (小湊 美和)
After leaving Hello! Project, she made her solo indies debut. She then formed a unit, called "Priest", with her younger brother Akihisa.

== Discography ==
=== Albums ===
| # | Title | Release date | Ranking |
|---|---|---|---|
| 1 | Taiyō & Ciscomoon 1 | 1999-10-27 | 3 |
| 2 | 2nd Stage | 2000-09-27 | 23 |
| 3 | Taiyō to Ciscomoon/T&C Bomber: Mega Best (太陽とシスコムーン/T&Cボンバー メガベスト) | 2008-12-10 | 148 |

=== Singles ===
| # | Title | Release date | Ranking |
|---|---|---|---|
| 1 | "Tsuki to Taiyō" (月と太陽) | 1999-04-21 | 4 |
| 2 | "Gatamekira" (ガタメキラ) | 1999-06-23 | 6 |
| 3 | "Uchū de La Ta Ta" (宇宙でLa Ta Ta) | 1999-07-28 | 9 |
| 4 | "Everyday Everywhere" | 1999-08-25 | 23 |
| 5 | "Magic of Love" | 1999-09-29 | 16 |
| 6 | "Marui Taiyō -Winter Version-" (丸い太陽 -Winter Version-) | 1999-12-08 | 25 |
| 7 | "Don't Stop Ren'aichū" (Don't Stop 恋愛中) | 2000-04-19 | 23 |
| 8 | "Hey! Mahiru no Shinkirō" (Hey！真昼の蜃気楼) | 2000-07-19 | 31 |

=== DVDs ===
| Title | Release date |
|---|---|
| Concert Tour 2000 Yo! Yo! Taiyo-La! Mūnsan no Dance Tengoku (Concert Tour 2000 Yo! Yo! Taiyo-La! むうんさんのダンス天国) | 2000-08-30 |
| All Taiyō to Ciscomoon / T&C Bomber (オール太陽とシスコムーン・T&Cボンバー) | 2000-12-13 |
| "Arekara10nen Taiyō to Ciscomoon LIVE 2009 Last & New Decade" (あれから10年 太陽とシスコムーン LIVE 2009 Last & New Decade) | 2010-01-15 |
| "Taiyō to Ciscomoon 20th Anniversary Live Last & New Decade 2" (太陽とシスコムーン 20th Anniversary Live Last & New Decade 2) | 2019-12-28 |

=== Television ===
| Title | Network |
|---|---|
| Asayan | TV Tokyo series |
| ハロー!モーニング。 (Hello! Morning) | TV Tokyo |
| モーニング娘。のへそ (Morning Musume no Heso) | TV Tokyo |
| ガレージ (Garage) | TV Tokyo |
