= Tsukahara (vault) =

Gymnastics skill

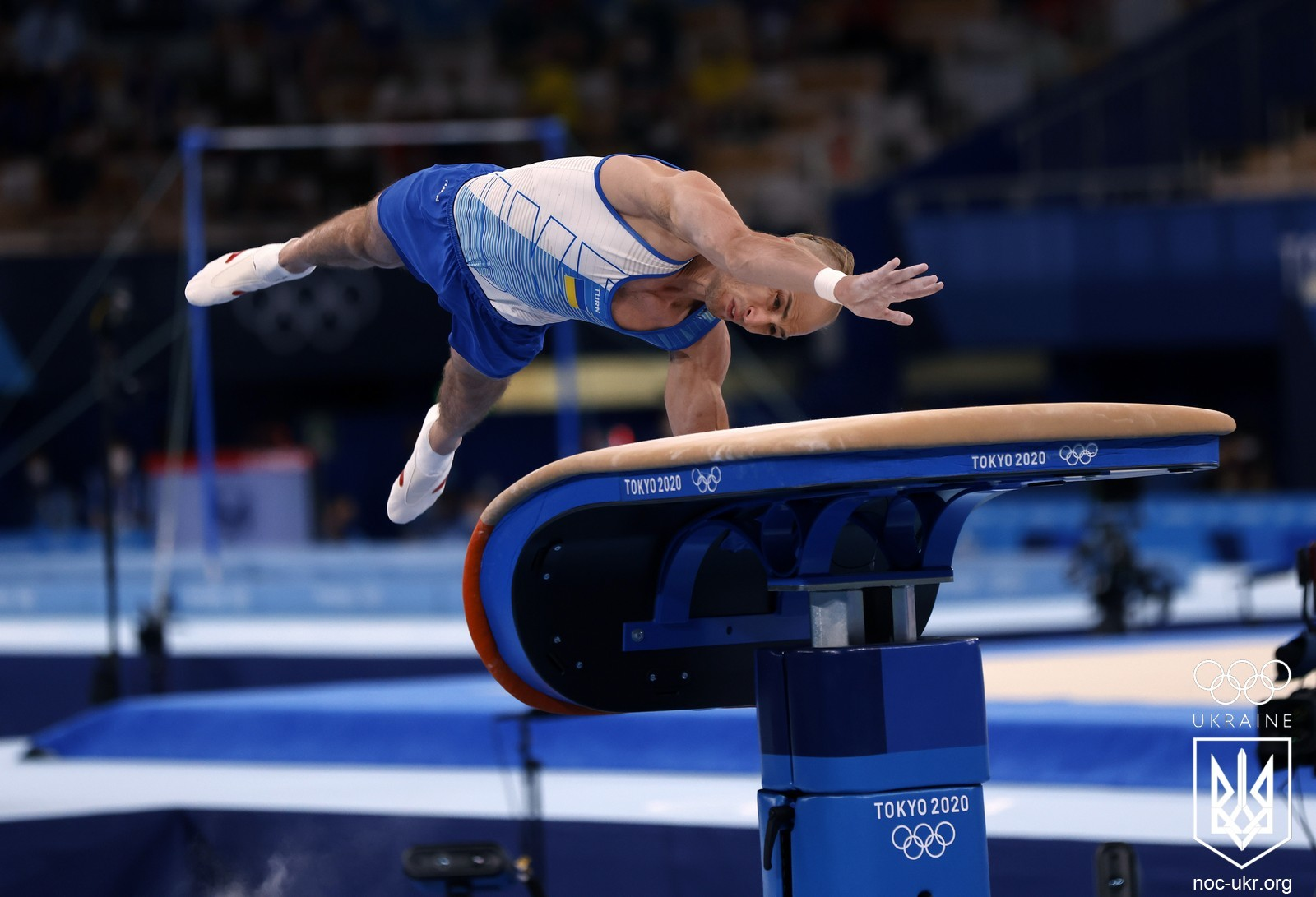
Petro Pakhnyuk competing a Tsukahara vault at the 2020 Summer Olympics

The Tsukahara can refer to a specific vault and a family of vaults in artistic gymnastics. The first Tsukahara vault was performed by (and named after) Mitsuo Tsukahara in 1972.

A Tsukahara vault consists of a half turn off the springboard onto the vault table, then a push backward, usually into a back salto or layout.

In Japanese, this technique is known as a "Moonsault".

== Variations ==
Any vault that has a handspring with 1/4 – 1/2 turn onto the vault table into a salto backward is classified as a Tsukahara vault. Some variations on the Tsukahara vaults include:

- Kim – Tsukahara tucked or stretched with full twist (360°) off
- Zamolodchikova – Tsukahara stretched with a 2/1 turn (720°) off
- Phelps – a half turn onto the vault table, followed by a half turn off and into a front layout.
