= Sasada Natsumi =

Japanese artistic gymnast

- Born: 31 August 1995 (age 31) Tokyo, Japan

Gymnastics career
- Discipline: Women's artistic gymnastics
- Country represented: Japan
Medal record
Representing Japan
Asian Championships
Gold medal – first place	2015 Hiroshima	Team
Summer Universiade
Silver medal – second place	2015 Gwangju	Team
Silver medal – second place	2017 Taipei	Balance Beam
Bronze medal – third place	2015 Gwangju	All-Around
Bronze medal – third place	2017 Taipei	Team

Sasada Natsumi (笹田 夏実, born 31 August 1995) is a Japanese former artistic gymnast. She was part of the silver medalist team at the 2015 Summer Universiade, where she also won a bronze medal in the individual all-around competition; she won an individual silver at the 2017 Summer Universiade on the balance beam. Sasada also competed for Japan in the first-ever Youth Olympic Games in 2010.

== Early and personal life ==
Sasada's mother was Sasada Yayoi, a three-times national champion, who also coached her. They were the first mother-daughter pair to both win Japanese artistic gymnastics national titles. She enrolled in Nippon Sport Science University in 2014. After graduating, she enrolled in a coaching-related graduate program at the same university.

In 2021, Sasada was a member of the Olympic Torch Relay for the 2020 Summer Olympics in honor of her mother, who died in 2019.

== Career ==
In 2008, Sasada won the junior national championships. She was second place behind Kōko Tsurumi at the senior national championships in 2010. While she was too young to compete as a senior internationally, she completed a difficult laid-out back somersault with a full twist on the balance beam, an element with a high difficulty rating of "G". At the 2010 Summer Youth Olympics, she placed 4th in the all-around and in the vault final.

She did not compete much in 2011, as she was injured. However, at the All-Japan Team and Apparatus Championships, she won the uneven bars and balance beam titles.

Sasada attempted to make the 2012 Summer Olympics team, which would have five members. At the last day of the second qualifying event, however, she made two major mistakes, placing her hands on the balance beam and going out of bounds on the floor exercise. She finished in 6th place. Sasada reported spent some time sitting backstage, unresponsive out of shock. Two months afterward, she had surgery on her right wrist.

While watching the Olympics, Sasada was inspired by seeing her friend, Asuka Teramoto, compete. Afterward, she took a new approach to training where instead of stopping and crying from frustration after making mistakes, she attempted to push through and complete routines even after errors. Her mother also stepped away from coaching her in 2013, saying that there was nothing further she could teach her.

Sasada won the senior All-Japan Artistic Gymnastics Championships two consecutive times in 2013 and 2014. She competed at the 2013 World Championships, where she placed 23rd, and the 2014 World Championships, where she was 20th.

At the 2015 Summer Universiade in July, she was part of the silver medalist team and won bronze in the individual all-around. Afterward, she competed at the 2015 Asian Championships and won gold with the Japanese team. Later that year, she was 39th at the 2015 World Championships.

After struggling in both team qualification events, Sasada was named an alternate for the 2016 Summer Olympics.

Sasada competed at the 2017 Summer Universiade and finished 5th in the all-around. She won silver on the balance beam and also qualified for the floor exercise final, where she finished 8th.
