= Sakura Yumoto =

Japanese artistic gymnast

- Born: 8 March 1997 (age 29)
- Height: 147 cm (4 ft 10 in)

Gymnastics career
- Discipline: Women's artistic gymnastics
- Country represented: Japan
Medal record
Representing Japan
Asian Games
Bronze medal – third place	2014 Incheon	Team
Asian Championships
Gold medal – first place	2015 Hiroshima	Team
East Asian Games
Silver medal – second place	2013 Tianjin	Team
Silver medal – second place	2013 Tianjin	Floor Exercise
Summer Universiade
Silver medal – second place	2015 Gwangju	Team

Sakura Yumoto (湯元 さくら, Yumoto Sakura; born 8 March 1997) is a Japanese artistic gymnast. She was part of the silver medalling team at the 2015 Summer Universiade in Gwangju, South Korea and the bronze medalling team at the 2014 Asian Games in Incheon also South Korea.
