= Seiji Kumagai =

Japanese voice actor

- 熊谷 誠二
- Born: July 9, 1967 (age 57); Tokorozawa, Saitama, Japan
- Occupation: Voice actor

Seiji Kumagai (熊谷 誠二, Kumagai Seiji, born July 9, 1967) is a Japanese voice actor from Tokorozawa, Saitama.

== Filmography ==
=== Anime ===
- Captain (Anime) - Marui
- Captain (film) - Marui
- Captain (special) - Marui
- Star Blazers: The Comet Empire - Child
- Toki no Tabibito -Time Stranger- - Nobuccho Yamazaki

=== Dubbing Roles ===
==== Live Action television ====
- Goosebumps - Skipper Matthews (Dan Warry-Smith) in episode: Attack of the Mutant Parts I & II
- The Cosby Show (Theo) (Malcolm-Jamal Warner)
- The Heights (Stan Lee) (Alex Désert)

==== Live Action films ====
- Dirty Harry (Additional voice) (VHS/DVD versions)
