= Chieko Oda =

Japanese gymnast (1947–2024)

Chieko Tsukuhara
- Alternative name: Chieko Oda
- Born: 12 August 1947 Nagasaki, Japan
- Died: 1 September 2024 (aged 77)
- Spouse: Mitsuo Tsukahara
- Relatives: Naoya Tsukahara (son)

Gymnastics career
- Discipline: Women's artistic gymnastics
- Country represented: Japan

Chieko Tsukuhara, née Oda (塚原 千恵子, Tsukuhara Chieko; 12 August 1947 – 1 September 2024) was a Japanese artistic gymnast who competed at the 1968 Summer Olympics. After her competitive career, she became a coach and served as a director at the Japan Gymnastics Association.

== Career ==
Tsukuhara began ballet lessons when she was in elementary school, which she continued through her second year of high school. When she became a high school student, she had to join a club and chose gymnastics; she was the only girl in the club. Her favorite apparatus was the vault.

She competed at the 1967 Summer Universiade, where she won gold in the team event with her teammates.

The next year, she competed at the North American Gymnastics Championships in Vancouver in February. In October, she competed in six events at the 1968 Summer Olympics in Mexico City. A hip injury prevented her from participating in half of the training sessions. The team ranked 4th, and Tsukuhara finished 19th individually. In 1969, she was the runner-up to Cathy Rigby at the United States Gymnastic Federation's World Cup invitational and won the All-Japan Championships.

In 1971, she was part of the exhibition program "Salute to Sport" at the Calgary Stampede. She retired due to injury.

== Post-competitive career ==
Tsukuhara served as team leader of the Japanese women's gymnastics team in 1976 and as the women's head coach at the gym she owned with her husband in 2000. She became the head of the women's national gymnastics team, coaching the national teams for the 2008 and 2012 Summer Olympics; she was unable to travel to the 2016 Summer Olympics in person due to a hear condition. She was also a director at the Japan Gymnastics Association in charge of the women's team's development.

In August 2018, the Association banned the coach of Sae Miyakawa, an artistic gymnast who competed in the 2016 Summer Olympics, for physical abuse. Miyakawa acknowledged being hit by her coach but said she wanted to continue to train with him. She accused Tsukuhara of engaging in power harassment, alleging that Tsukuhara pressured her to testify to being abused, disparaged her family, and tried to force her to transfer to the gym owned by the Tsukuharas. The Association began an third-party investigation into Miyakawa's claims and temporarily suspended the Tsukuharas from their duties beginning in September.

Tsukuhara stated in response that some of her reported remarks had either been taken out of context or had not happened, and that she had reported Miyakawa's coach out of concern after seeing her being forced to stand and be lectured for an hour at the national training center. Shortly thereafter, and her husband released an apology to Miyakawa through their legal counsel and stating that they intended to fully cooperate with the investigation. The investigation concluded in December. The official report stated that while the conduct of the Tsukuharas was inappropriate, it did not cross the line into power harassment. Tsukuhara was allowed to resume her work as the head of the women's development. She stated her intention to step down when her term expired in March 2019, saying that although her actions had not been designated as power harassment, some of her conduct had been inappropriate.

== Personal life and death ==
Tsukuhara was born in Nagasaki in 1947. She attended Nippon Sport Science University on the recommendation of her coach. She married fellow gymnast Mitsuo Tsukahara, who she met at university; their son was gymnast Naoya Tsukahara.

She died from stomach cancer 1 September, 2024, at the age of 77.
