= Thomas Grasso (gymnast) =

Italian artistic gymnast

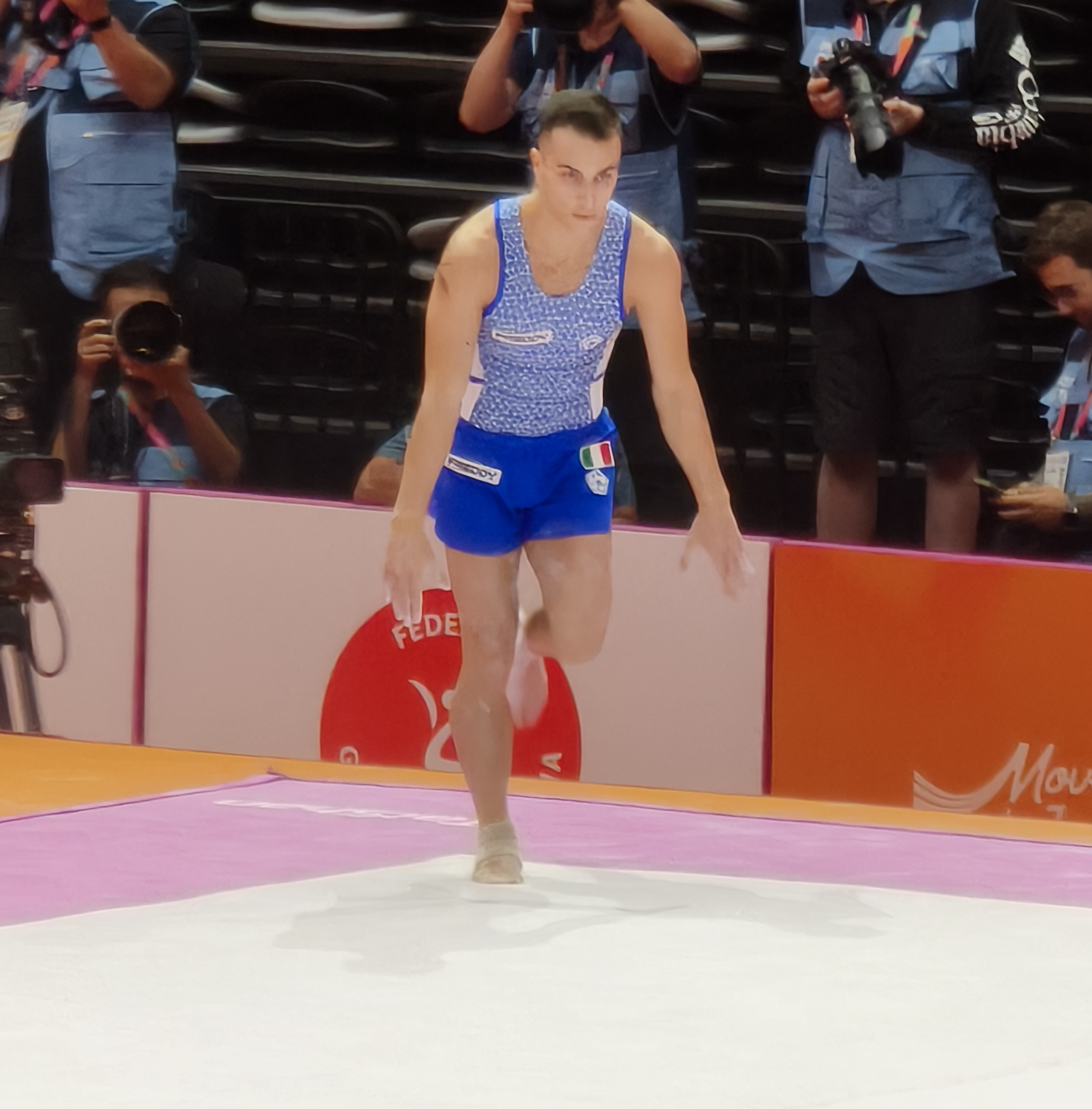

Personal information
- Born: 8 November 2000 (age 25) Rimini, Italy

Gymnastics career
- Discipline: Men's artistic gymnastics
- Country represented: Italy
- Club: Polisportiva Celle (Rimini)
- Head coach: Pietro Di Pumpo
Medal record
Men's artistic gymnastics
Representing Italy
FIG World Cup
Event	1st	2nd	3rd
Apparatus World Cup	0	0	1
World Challenge Cup	1	0	0
Total	1	0	1

Thomas Grasso (born 8 November 2000) is an Italian artistic gymnast. At the 2021 World Artistic Gymnastics Championships in Kitakyushu he placed 4th in the vault event finals. At the 2022 Cottbus Apparatus World Cup event he placed 3rd in Floor Exercise.

== Competitive history ==
Year	Event	Team	AA	FX	PH	SR	VT	PB	HB
2021
2021	World Championships						4		
2022	Cottbus World Cup			3rd place, bronze medalist(s)					
2025	Paris World Challenge Cup						1st place, gold medalist(s)		
