= Heo Seon-mi =

South Korean artistic gymnast

- Born: 15 January 1995 (age 31) Seoul, South Korea
- Height: 155 cm (5 ft 1 in)

Gymnastics career
- Discipline: Women's artistic gymnastics
- Country represented: South Korea
Medal record
Summer Universiade
Bronze medal – third place	2015 Gwangju	Team
Asian Championships
Bronze medal – third place	2015 Hiroshima	Team

Heo Seon-mi (born 15 January 1995) was a South Korean female artistic gymnast who competed at the 2012 Summer Olympics. She won team bronze medals at the 2015 Asian Championships and the 2015 Summer Universiade. She is a two-time reserve for the all-around final at the World Championships.

== Gymnastics career ==
Heo won the national junior all-around title in 2010 and became age-eligible for senior international competition in 2011. She competed at her first Artistic Gymnastics World Championships in 2011. She finished 35th in the all-around qualifications, which made her the third reserve for the all-around final. Additionally, the South Korea team placed 16th and earned a berth to the 2012 Olympic Test Event. There, Heo placed 18th in the all-around, earning an individual berth to the 2012 Summer Olympics, as South Korea failed to qualify as a team. At the Olympics, she aimed to advance into the all-around final but fell off the uneven bars and the balance beam and finished 48th in the qualifications.

Heo advanced into the all-around final at the 2013 Summer Universiade and finished 12th. At the 2013 East Asian Games, she won a silver medal on the uneven bars, behind China's Tan Jiaxin. She led the South Korean team to the bronze medal at the 2015 Summer Universiade, finishing behind Russia and Japan. She once again advanced into the all-around final, where she finished ninth. Afterward, she competed at the 2015 Asian Championships and won another team bronze medal. There, she advanced into the uneven bars final and finished fourth, only 0.050 points behind the bronze medalist. At the 2015 World Championships, she finished 31st in the all-around qualifications and was the fourth reserve for the final. This was the final international competition of Heo's career.
