= Mitsuo Tsukahara =

Japanese artistic gymnast

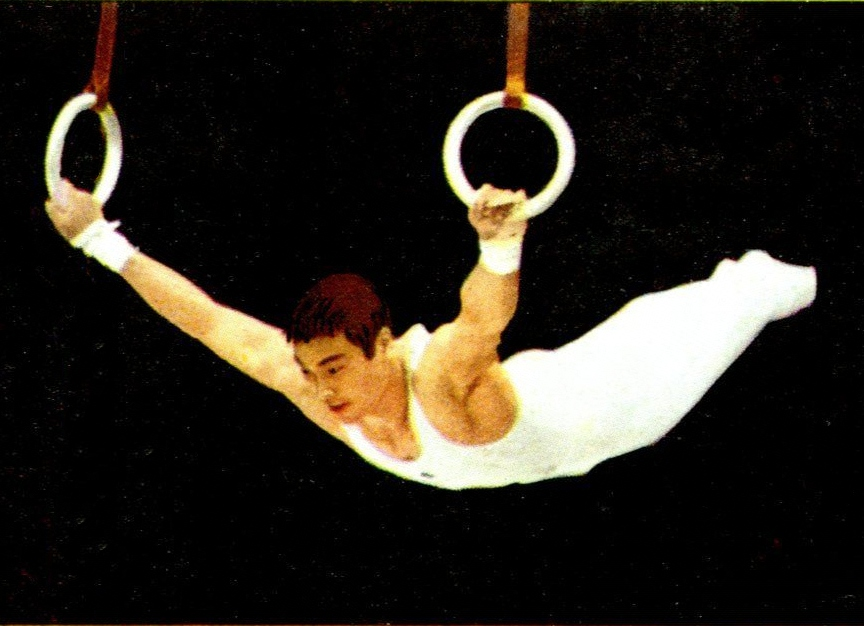

Personal information
- Born: December 22, 1947 (age 78) Tokyo, Japan
- Height: 166 cm (5 ft 5 in)
- Spouse: Chieko Oda
- Relatives: Naoya Tsukahara (son)

Gymnastics career
- Discipline: Men's artistic gymnastics
- Country represented: Japan
- Eponymous skills: Tsukahara vault
Medal record
Olympic Games
Gold medal – first place	1968 Mexico City	Team
Gold medal – first place	1972 Munich	Team
Gold medal – first place	1972 Munich	Horizontal bar
Gold medal – first place	1976 Montreal	Team
Gold medal – first place	1976 Montreal	Horizontal bar
Silver medal – second place	1976 Montreal	Vault
Bronze medal – third place	1972 Munich	Rings
Bronze medal – third place	1976 Montreal	All-around
Bronze medal – third place	1976 Montreal	Parallel bars
World Championships
Gold medal – first place	1970 Ljubljana	Vault
Gold medal – first place	1970 Ljubljana	Team
Gold medal – first place	1974 Varna	Team
Gold medal – first place	1978 Strasbourg	Team
Silver medal – second place	1970 Ljubljana	All-around
Silver medal – second place	1970 Ljubljana	Rings
American Cup
Gold medal – first place	1977 New York	All-around

Mitsuo Tsukahara (塚原 光男 Tsukahara Mitsuo, born December 22, 1947) was a Japanese artistic gymnast. He was five-times an Olympic gold medalist. He remained active in the sport after his retirement from competition. He served as vice president of the Japan Gymnastics Association.

Tsukahara competed throughout the late 1960s and 1970s, retiring from gymnastics competition in 1978 after the World Championships. Winning five gold, one silver and three bronze medals, Tsukahara was an important contributor in Japan's win at the team competition in three consecutive Olympic Games: in 1968, 1972 and 1976. He married fellow gymnast Chieko Oda. He remained connected to the gymnastics world, partly through his son Naoya Tsukahara, who was also a multi-medalist at the World Championships and Olympic Games throughout the late 1990s and who still competed as of 2014.

== Skills ==
Tsukahara's name is one of the most famous in gymnastics due to its association with two widely performed skills. The first is the full-twisting double salto in the tuck position (with the full twist in the first salto). The Men's Gymnastics Code of Points credits Tsukahara for premiering this skill on floor exercise and horizontal bar, and he regularly performed it on these events throughout his career. In fact, in many nations, it is customary to call a full-twisting double salto tumble or dismount a "Tsukahara" on all apparatus, both for men and women. This skill is sometimes called a "Moon Somersault" or "Moon Salto".

Tsukahara is also credited with having invented a vaulting technique called the "Tsukahara vault". This vault is generally described as a roundoff over the horse/table into a backward salto, with or without twist. However, until 2005, when the horse was replaced with a table, women usually performed Tsukahara-type vaults on the side horse with a half-twist entry onto the horse rather than a quarter twist entry. Tsukahara himself did this vault in a stretched position, generally without twist.

The name "Tsukahara" is so strongly associated with the 1/4-on entry, that it is routinely misapplied to the more commonly used Kasamatsu-style vault, in which the 1/4 turn off the horse "untwists" so that the salto is initiated forwards or sideways. In fact, Tsukahara himself, who entered the horse on his left side but also twisted to the left, would have done a Kasamatsu vault if he had tried to twist. However, the Tsukahara style is certainly still very popular among gymnasts who:

- do the basic vault in tucked, piked, or stretched position
- twist the opposite direction of their entry side, e.g. Gervasio Deferr, who repeated as Olympic Vault Champion in 2004 by premiering the Tsukahara with 2.5 twists
- do two saltos instead of just one, e.g. Leszek Blanik, the 2008 Olympic Vault Champion, who is one of many gymnasts to perform a Tsukahara double pike.

== Honors ==
In November 2009, Tsukahara was awarded with a Medal of Honour with purple ribbon by the Government of Japan.

== See also ==
- List of multiple Olympic gold medalists
- List of multiple Summer Olympic medalists
