= Asuka Teramoto =

Japanese artistic gymnast

- Born: November 19, 1995 (age 30) Komaki, Aichi, Japan
- Height: 1.36 m (4 ft 6 in)

Gymnastics career
- Discipline: Women's artistic gymnastics
- Country represented: Japan
- Club: Chukyo University (JPN)
- Music: Toki no Tobira (2011–12), Saltimbanco by Cirque du Soleil (2013)
- World ranking: 8 (Olympic Games, 2016)
Medal record
Representing Japan
Asian Championships
Gold medal – first place	2015 Hiroshima	Team
Silver medal – second place	2015 Hiroshima	Balance Beam
Bronze medal – third place	2015 Hiroshima	All-Around
Summer Universiade
Gold medal – first place	2019 Napoli	Team
Silver medal – second place	2015 Gwangju	Team
Silver medal – second place	2015 Gwangju	All-Around
Silver medal – second place	2015 Gwangju	Uneven Bars
Silver medal – second place	2017 Taipei	All-Around
Silver medal – second place	2017 Taipei	Floor Exercise
Bronze medal – third place	2017 Taipei	Team
Bronze medal – third place	2019 Napoli	Uneven Bars
FIG World Cup
Event / 1st / 2nd / 3rd; All-Around World Cup / 0 / 1 / 1

Asuka Teramoto (寺本 明日香, Teramoto Asuka; born 19 November 1995) is a Japanese gymnast.

== Gymnastics career ==
Teramoto was born in Komaki, Aichi. Her first major international senior competition was the 2011 World Artistic Gymnastics Championships in Tokyo, Japan. In the team all-around finals, she contributed on vaulting, uneven bars, and balance beam towards the Japanese team's 7th-place finish. She also qualified for the uneven bars final in 8th place. She ended up finishing in a tie for 5th with Gabrielle Douglas, finishing ahead of teammate Tsurumi Kōko. That event was won by Viktoria Komova of Russia.

She competed for the national team at the 2012 Summer Olympics in the Women's artistic team all-around. Teramoto also qualified 8th for the individual all-around, as well as being named a reserve for both the balance beam and floor exercise finals. She ended up placing 11th in the all-around final. She was the smallest and lightest competitor, at 1.36 m (4 ft 6 in) tall and weighing 30 kg (66 lb), of all those at the Games.

In October 2013, Teramoto competed at the 2013 World Artistic Gymnastics Championships in Antwerp, Belgium. After a mediocre qualification competition, she managed to qualify for the individual all-around final in 23rd place. She did much better in the final, finishing in 9th, ahead of teammate Natsumi Sasada, who finished in 23rd. That final was won by Simone Biles of the United States. Teramoto also competed at a World Cup event in Glasgow, finishing 4th in the women's individual all-around, which was won by Larisa Iordache of Romania.

At the 2014 Japanese National Championships, Teramoto became the uneven bars champion, as well as the all-around silver medalist behind Natsumi Sasada and vault bronze medalist behind Sae Miyakawa and Mai Murakami. Due to her results, Teramoto was named to Japan's 2014 World Championships team that competed in Nanning and placed eighth in the team final. Individually, she qualified to the balance beam final where she narrowly missed out on the bronze medal, placing just 0.066 points behind Aliya Mustafina of Russia. Simone Biles of the United States went on to win the gold medal and Bai Yawen of China earned the silver.

At the 2015 Universiade, she placed second in the all-around and the uneven bars.

Teramoto began the 2016 season at the Glasgow World Cup, finishing 4th in the All-Around. She continued her season at the 2016 All-Japan National Championships, the first step to qualify to the 2016 Olympic team. Teramoto won the silver medal in the All-Around behind Mai Murakami, also winning the national title on balance beam. At the second qualifying event, the NHK Trophy, Teramoto won the All-Around Title, ahead of Mai Murakami and Aiko Sugihara. With this win, Teramoto secured a berth onto the Olympic team. At the Olympic Games, she missed event finals, but she did manage to qualify for the team and individual all around finals. In the team finals, she helped her team place 4th, their best finish since the 1964 Olympic Games. In the individual all-around final, she once again delivered solid performances, placing a personal best finish of 8th in the all around.
