= Elze Geurts =

Dutch artistic gymnast

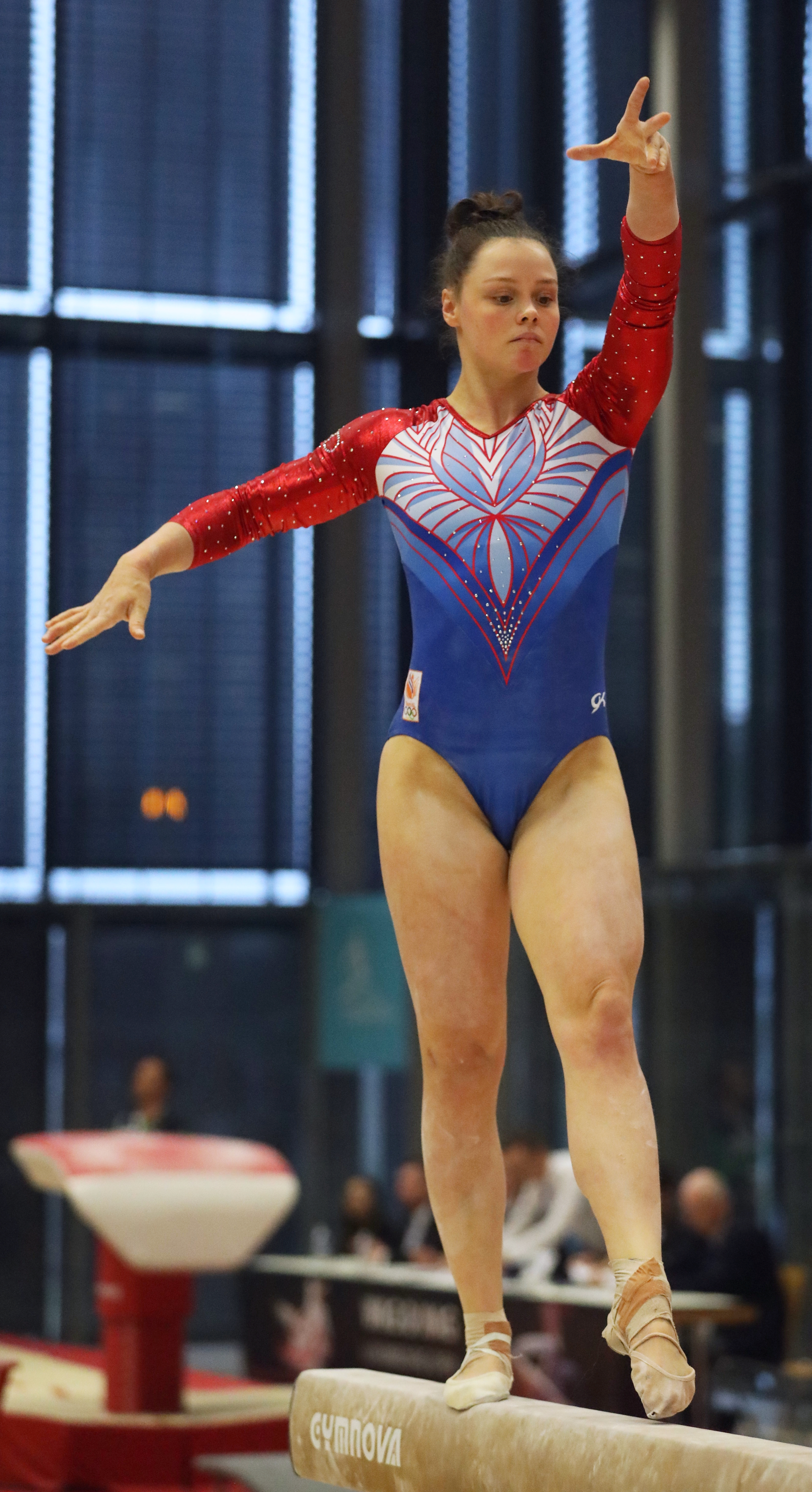
- Elze Geurts, 2023

Personal information
- Full name: Elisabeth Geurts
- Nickname: Elze
- Born: 26 April 1995 (age 31) Raalte, Netherlands
- Height: 1.65 m (5 ft 5 in)

Gymnastics career
- Discipline: Women's artistic gymnastics
- Country represented: Netherlands
- Club: Turnz Amsterdam
- Head coach: Aimee Boorman

Elisabeth "Elze" Geurts (born 26 April 1995) is a Dutch artistic gymnast. She represented her country at the 2021 World Championships, as well as at the 2015, 2017 and 2019 Summer Universiade, and was named an alternate to the Dutch gymnastics team for the 2020 Summer Olympics.

== Personal life ==
As of 2021, Geurts was studying medicine and philosophy at the University of Amsterdam.

== Career ==
Geurts has had an unusual career trajectory for an elite gymnast, as she did not make the national team until her twenties. Although she was considered a top prospect as a child, she plateaued as an adolescent and was written off as too tall to be competitive. Her progress had also been hindered by two Achilles tendon ruptures.

Geurts represented the Netherlands at the 2015, 2017 and 2019 Summer Universiade. She qualified to the vault final at both the 2017 and 2019 Universiade, finishing eighth and sixth respectively.

In 2021, Geurts won the all-around at the 1st Dutch Olympic Trial, where she also picked up the gold on vault, silver on floor exercise and bronze on the uneven bars. She was named an alternate to the Dutch team for the postponed 2020 Summer Olympics after placing eighth in the all-around at the 2nd Olympic Trial.

Following the Tokyo Olympics, Geurts placed first on vault at the 1st Dutch Worlds Trial, and was selected to compete at the 2021 World Championships in Kitakyushu, Japan, making her World championship debut at the age of 26. In the qualification round of the World championships, Geurts qualified to the vault final in second place behind reigning Olympic vault champion Rebeca Andrade. She also placed thirteenth on floor exercise, and was the third reserve for the floor final. However, during the vault final, Geurts fell on her second vault and placed eighth with a total score of 13.349.

In February 2022, Geurts suffered a torn ACL in her right knee while training.

== Selected competitive skills ==
Apparatus	Name	Description	Difficulty (Note: Valid for the 2022–2024 Code of Points)	Performed
Vault	Baitova	Yurchenko entry, laid out salto backwards with two twists	5.0	2021
Uneven Bars	Piked jaeger	Reverse grip swing to piked salto forwards to catch high bar	D	2021
Floor Exercise	Podkopayeva I	Double salto forward tucked	E	2021
Floor Exercise	Tarasevich	Salto forward stretched with double (2/1) twist	D	2021

== Competitive history ==
Year	Event	Team	AA	VT	UB	BB	FX
2015	Summer Universiade		18				
2016	Wase Gymcup		8			3rd place, bronze medalist(s)	
2016	Dutch Team Championships	7	11			3rd place, bronze medalist(s)	
2016	Bundesliga Semifinals	2nd place, silver medalist(s)	2nd place, silver medalist(s)	2nd place, silver medalist(s)	2nd place, silver medalist(s)		
2017	1st Bundesliga	6	3rd place, bronze medalist(s)	1st place, gold medalist(s)			
2017	IAG SportEvent		4				
2017	Dutch Championships		7	6	5	4	
2017	Summer Universiade	5		8			
2017	Dutch Women's Invitational		6	2nd place, silver medalist(s)	6		7
2017	2nd Bundesliga	6	2nd place, silver medalist(s)	2nd place, silver medalist(s)	2nd place, silver medalist(s)		
2017	Wase Gymcup		2nd place, silver medalist(s)		2nd place, silver medalist(s)	4	
2017	3rd Bundesliga	8	9	1st place, gold medalist(s)			
2017	Dutch Team Championships	2nd place, silver medalist(s)		1st place, gold medalist(s)	1st place, gold medalist(s)	2nd place, silver medalist(s)	
2018	1st Bundesliga	1st place, gold medalist(s)	2nd place, silver medalist(s)	1st place, gold medalist(s)	1st place, gold medalist(s)		
2018	2nd Bundesliga	2nd place, silver medalist(s)	3rd place, bronze medalist(s)	1st place, gold medalist(s)	1st place, gold medalist(s)		
2018	3rd Bundesliga	3rd place, bronze medalist(s)	5		1st place, gold medalist(s)		
2018	Klaverblad Championships		3rd place, bronze medalist(s)	1st place, gold medalist(s)	3rd place, bronze medalist(s)	3rd place, bronze medalist(s)	
2018	Dutch Championships		11	3rd place, bronze medalist(s)			
2018	Heerenveen Friendly	2nd place, silver medalist(s)	16		8		
2018	Varsenare Friendly	2nd place, silver medalist(s)	10	3rd place, bronze medalist(s)			
2018	4th Bundesliga	2nd place, silver medalist(s)	10	1st place, gold medalist(s)			1st place, gold medalist(s)
2019	2nd Bundesliga	7	15	2nd place, silver medalist(s)			
2019	FIT Challenge		25				
2019	Dutch Championships		9	4			4
2019	Summer Universiade		9	6			
2019	3rd Bundesliga	8	5	2nd place, silver medalist(s)			
2019	Dutch Team Championships	4	5				3rd place, bronze medalist(s)
2020	1st Bundesliga	3rd place, bronze medalist(s)	4	1st place, gold medalist(s)			
2021	Heerenveen Friendly		3rd place, bronze medalist(s)	2nd place, silver medalist(s)			1st place, gold medalist(s)
2021	1st Dutch Olympic Trial		1st place, gold medalist(s)	1st place, gold medalist(s)	3rd place, bronze medalist(s)		2nd place, silver medalist(s)
2021	2nd Dutch Olympic Trial		8	1st place, gold medalist(s)			
2021	1st Dutch Worlds Trial		4	1st place, gold medalist(s)	3rd place, bronze medalist(s)		
2021	2nd Dutch Worlds Trial			4			
2021	World Championships			8			R3
2025
2025	European Championships	5		5			
