= 2022 Asian Artistic Gymnastics Championships =

International gymnastics competition

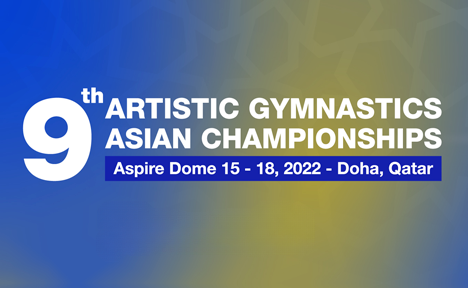
- Host city: Doha, Qatar
- Dates: 15–18 June
- Main venue: Aspire Dome

The 2022 Asian Artistic Gymnastics Championships was the ninth edition of the Asian Artistic Gymnastics Championships, and were held in Doha, Qatar from 15 to 28 June 2022.

== Medal summary ==
=== Men ===
Event	Gold	Silver	Bronze
Team	China; Shi Cong; Yang Jiaxing; Yin Dehang; Lin Chaopan; Lan Xingyu	Japan; Koki Maeda; Shiga Tachibana; Tsuyoshi Hasegawa; Daiki Hidaka; Kenya Yuasa	Chinese Taipei; Tang Chia-hung; Lee Chih-kai; Lin Guan-yi; Hung Yuan-hsi; Tseng Wei-sheng
Individual all-around	Shi Cong; China	Carlos Yulo; Philippines	Yang Jiaxing; China
Floor	Carlos Yulo; Philippines	Kim Han-sol; South Korea	Yang Jiaxing; China
Pommel horse	Ahmad Abu Al-Soud; Jordan	Nariman Kurbanov; Kazakhstan	Yin Dehang; China
Rings	Lan Xingyu; China	Mehdi Ahmad Kohani; Iran	Lin Guan-yi; Chinese Taipei
Vault	Carlos Yulo; Philippines	Kim Han-sol; South Korea	Shiga Tachibana; Japan
Parallel bars	Carlos Yulo; Philippines	Tsuyoshi Hasegawa; Japan	Yin Dehang; China
Horizontal bar	Yun Jin-seong; South Korea	Lin Chaopan; China	Milad Karimi; Kazakhstan

=== Women ===
Event	Gold	Silver	Bronze
Team	China; Zhang Jin; Tang Xijing; Wu Ran; Sun Xinyi; Wei Xiaoyuan	South Korea; Lee Yun-seo; Yeo Seo-jeong; Shin Sol-yi; Lee Da-yeong; Lee Eun-ju	Japan; Shoko Miyata; Chiharu Yamada; Arisa Kasahara; Hazuki Watanabe; Touwa Matsuda
Individual all-around	Zhang Jin; China	Tang Xijing; China	Lee Yun-seo; South Korea
Vault	Yeo Seo-jeong; South Korea	Shoko Miyata; Japan	Pranati Nayak; India
Uneven bars	Wei Xiaoyuan; China	Tang Xijing; China	Lee Yun-seo; South Korea
Balance beam	Wu Ran; China	Arisa Kasahara; Japan	Zhang Jin; China
Floor	Wu Ran; China	Shoko Miyata; Japan	Lee Yun-seo; South Korea

== Medal table ==
Rank	Nation	Gold	Silver	Bronze	Total
1	China	8	3	5	16
2	Philippines	3	1	0	4
3	South Korea	2	2	4	8
4	Jordan	1	0	0	1
5	Japan	0	6	1	7
6	Kazakhstan	0	1	1	2
7	Iran	0	1	0	1
8	Chinese Taipei	0	0	2	2
9	India	0	0	1	1
Totals (9 entries)		14	14	14	42

== World Championships qualification ==
This event served as qualification for the 2022 World Championships in Liverpool. The top five men's teams (China, Japan, Chinese Taipei, South Korea, and Kazakhstan) and top four women's teams (China, South Korea, Japan, and Chinese Taipei) qualified a full team to compete. As for individual qualification, the top six men and top eight women in the all-around standings not part of a qualified team qualified as an individual (a max of two gymnasts per country). The top six men were Carlos Yulo (Philippines), Mehdi Ahmadkohani (Iran), Abdulla Azimov (Uzbekistan), Khabibullo Ergashev (Uzbekistan), Yogeshewar Singh (India), and Gaurav Kumar (India). The top eight women were Aida Bauyrzhanova (Kazakhstan), Rifda Irfanaluthfi (Indonesia), Milka Gehani (Sri Lanka), Dildora Aripova (Uzbekistan), Nadine Joy Nathan (Singapore), Ominakhon Khalilova (Uzbekistan), Korkem Yerbossynkyzy (Kazakhstan), and Sasiwimon Mueangphuan (Thailand).

== Men's results ==
=== Individual all-around ===
Rank	Gymnast	Floor (gymnastics)	Pommel horse	Rings (gymnastics)	Vault (gymnastics)	Parallel bars	Horizontal bar	Total
1st place, gold medalist(s)	(China) Shi Cong	13.900	13.200	14.200	13.533	14.867	14.133	83.833
2nd place, silver medalist(s)	(Philippines) Carlos Yulo	14.800	12.933	14.100	14.867	14.367	12.700	83.767
3rd place, bronze medalist(s)	(China) Yang Jiaxing	14.167	13.300	14.233	14.433	13.600	14.000	83.733
4	(Chinese Taipei) Tang Chia-Hung	14.000	13.767	13.833	14.433	13.500	14.067	83.600
5	(Japan) Koki Maeda	14.433	13.000	13.500	14.233	14.633	13.133	82.932
6	(South Korea) Ryu Sung-hyun	14.433	12.700	13.767	14.733	13.433	13.733	82.799
7	(South Korea) Lee Junghyo	13.933	13.700	13.700	13.967	14.167	12.567	82.034
8	(Chinese Taipei) Lee Chih-kai	13.967	15.100	12.167	14.533	13.633	12.600	82.000
9	(Japan) Shiga Tachibana	14.003	13.600	13.267	14.500	13.933	12.467	81.800
10	(Kazakhstan) Milad Karimi	13.467	11.400	13.100	14.333	14.533	13.867	80.700
11	(Kazakhstan) Ilyas Azizov	12.767	13.067	12.600	13.467	13.600	12.867	78.368
12	(Iran) Mehdi Ahmadkohani	12.000	12.400	14.367	13.033	13.167	12.867	77.834
13	(Uzbekistan) Abdulla Azimov	12.300	13.667	11.933	13.467	13.633	12.733	77.733
14	(Uzbekistan) Khabibullo Ergashev	12.567	12.267	12.667	13.533	13.433	12.800	77.267
15	(India) Yogeshwar Singh	11.967	12.300	12.467	13.900	13.367	12.933	76.934
16	(India) Gaurav Kumar	12.333	11.500	12.700	12.533	12.800	12.667	74.533
17	(Syria) Lais Najjar	12.933	10.767	12.100	13.600	11.633	12.533	73.566
18	(Jordan) Saleem Naghouj	10.267	11.267	13.100	13.967	13.567	10.967	73.135
19	(Iran) Seyedmohammed Shafiei	11.400	12.667	10.700	12.867	11.867	12.533	72.304
20	(Mongolia) Enkhtuvshin Damdindorj	13.367	11.367	11.900	13.567	11.233	10.067	71.501
21	(Mongolia) Usukhbayar Erkhembayar	11.933	9.933	12.200	13.667	12.167	10.567	70.467
22	(Singapore) Robin Sim	12.633	10.400	11.767	12.767	11.533	11.200	70.300
23	(Philippines) Juancho Miguel Besana	12.433	10.833	9.800	13.900	11.533	11.200	70.299
24	(Singapore) Zac Liew	12.433	10.100	10.933	13.067	10.967	11.200	68.700

=== Floor ===
Rank	Gymnast	D Score	E Score	Pen.	Total
1st place, gold medalist(s)	(Philippines) Carlos Yulo	6.300	8.600		14.933
2nd place, silver medalist(s)	(South Korea) Kim Han-sol	6.000	8.333		14.333
3rd place, bronze medalist(s)	(China) Yang Jiaxing	6.100	8.233		14.333
4	(Japan) Shiga Tachibana	5.900	8.400		14.300
5	(South Korea) Ryu Sung-hyun	6.100	8.167		14.267
6	(Japan) Koki Maeda	5.800	8.500	–0.1	14.200
7	(Kazakhstan) Dmitriy Patanin	5.900	7.900		13.800
8	(Chinese Taipei) Tang Chia-hung	5.700	7.833		13.533

=== Pommel horse ===
Rank	Gymnast	D Score	E Score	Pen.	Total
1st place, gold medalist(s)	(Jordan) Ahmad Abu Al-Soud	6.300	8.933		15.233
2nd place, silver medalist(s)	(Kazakhstan) Nariman Kurbanov	5.900	8.900		14.800
3rd place, bronze medalist(s)	(China) Yin Dehang	6.500	8.100		14.600
4	(Chinese Taipei) Lee Chih-kai	6.500	7.733		14.233
5	(South Korea) Lee Junghyo	6.000	8.067		14.067
6	(Chinese Taipei) Tang Chia-hung	5.000	8.367		13.367
7	(Iran) Saeid Reza Keikha	5.700	7.600		13.300
8	(Japan) Daiki Hidaka	5.400	7.600		13.000

=== Rings ===
Rank	Gymnast	D Score	E Score	Pen.	Total
1st place, gold medalist(s)	(China) Lan Xingyu	6.300	8.700	–0.5	14.500
2nd place, silver medalist(s)	(Iran) Mehdi Ahmadkohani	6.100	8.333		14.433
3rd place, bronze medalist(s)	(Chinese Taipei) Lin Guan-yi	5.900	8.300		14.200
4	(Philippines) Carlos Yulo	5.700	8.300		14.000
5	(China) Yang Jiaxing	5.900	7.867		13.767
6	(Uzbekistan) Abdulaziz Mirvaliev	5.700	7.800		13.500
7	(South Korea) Ryu Sung-hyun	5.000	8.467		13.467
8	(South Korea) Lee Jung-hyo	5.500	7.667		13.167

=== Vault ===
Rank	Gymnast	Vault 1				Vault 2				Total
Rank	Gymnast	D Score	E Score	Pen.	Score 1	D Score	E Score	Pen.	Score 2	Total
1st place, gold medalist(s)	(Philippines) Carlos Yulo	5.600	9.367		14.967	5.600	9.200		14.800	14.884
2nd place, silver medalist(s)	(South Korea) Kim Han-sol	5.600	9.200		14.800	5.200	8.933	–0.1	14.033	14.417
3rd place, bronze medalist(s)	(Japan) Shiga Tachibana	5.200	9.167		14.367	5.200	9.267		14.467	14.417
4	(Hong Kong) Shek Wai Hung	5.600	9.000	–0.1	14.500	4.800	9.233		14.266	14.383
5	(Chinese Taipei) Tseng Wei-Sheng	5.600	8.900	–0.3	14.200	5.200	9.133		14.333	14.267
6	(Jordan) Saleem Naghouj	5.200	9.000		14.200	4.800	8.933		13.733	13.967
7	(Hong Kong) Ng Ka Ki	5.200	8.067		13.267	5.600	8.767		14.367	13.817
8	(Kazakhstan) Dmitriy Patanin	5.200	8.100	–0.1	13.200	5.200	8.900	–0.1	14.000	13.600

=== Parallel bars ===
Rank	Gymnast	D Score	E Score	Pen.	Total
1st place, gold medalist(s)	(Philippines) Carlos Yulo	6.300	8.867		15.167
2nd place, silver medalist(s)	(Japan) Tsuyoshi Hasegawa	6.300	8.400		14.700
3rd place, bronze medalist(s)	(China) Yin Dehang	6.400	8.300		14.700
4	(Kazakhstan) Milad Karimi	5.900	8.567		14.467
5	(Japan) Koki Maeda	5.900	8.333		14.233
6	(Chinese Taipei) Hung Yuan-hsi	5.900	8.000	–0.3	13.600
7	(South Korea) Lee Junghyo	5.500	7.933		13.433
8	(China) Lin Chaopan	5.800	7.400		13.200

=== Horizontal bar ===
Rank	Gymnast	D Score	E Score	Pen.	Total
1	(South Korea) Yun Jinseong	5.800	8.367		14.167
2	(China) Lin Chaopan	6.100	8.067		14.167
3	(Kazakhstan) Milad Karimi	5.800	8.333		14.133
4	(Japan) Daiki Hidaka	5.400	8.667		14.067
5	(Japan) Tsuyoshi Hasegawa	5.300	8.533		13.833
6	(China) Yang Jiaxing	5.700	8.000		13.700
7	(South Korea) Ryu Sung-hyun	5.100	8.500		13.600
8	(Chinese Taipei) Tang Chia-hung	5.300	6.367	–0.3	11.367

== Women's results ==
=== Individual all-around ===
Rank	Gymnast	Vault (gymnastics)	Uneven bars	Balance beam	Floor (gymnastics)	Total
1st place, gold medalist(s)	(China) Zhang Jin	13.700	13.800	14.200	13.700	55.400
2nd place, silver medalist(s)	(China) Tang Xijing	13.033	14.500	12.967	13.467	53.967
3rd place, bronze medalist(s)	(South Korea) Lee Yun-seo	12.833	14.300	13.133	13.367	53.633
4	(Japan) Shoko Miyata	13.900	12.600	12.900	13.633	53.033
5	(South Korea) Yeo Seo-jeong	14.033	12.500	12.433	13.167	52.133
6	(Japan) Chiharu Yamada	12.933	13.900	12.167	12.233	51.233
7	(Chinese Taipei) Lai Pin-ju	12.800	11.967	12.633	12.600	50.000
8	(Chinese Taipei) Mai Liu Hsiang-han	12.367	12.733	12.533	11.667	49.300
9	(Kazakhstan) Aida Bauyrzhanova	12.567	11.233	12.567	12.467	48.834
10	(Indonesia) Rifda Irfanaluthfi	11.767	12.400	11.900	12.667	48.734
11	(Sri Lanka) Milka Gehani	12.900	12.733	11.833	10.533	47.999
12	(Uzbekistan) Dildora Aripova	12.367	11.067	11.933	12.567	47.934
13	(Singapore) Nadine Joy Nathan	12.833	12.400	11.000	11.533	47.766
14	(Uzbekistan) Ominakhon Khalilova	11.767	11.567	11.333	11.767	46.434
15	(Kazakhstan) Korkem Yerbossynkyzy	12.400	11.300	11.033	11.333	46.066
16	(Thailand) Sasiwimon Mueangphuan	12.500	7.767	10.833	12.567	43.667
17	(Indonesia) Ameera Hariadi	11.933	9.667	10.800	11.167	43.567
18	(Hong Kong) Hiu Ying Angel Wong	10.333	10.333	11.433	10.700	42.799
19	(India) Ruthuja Nataraj	12.867	8.433	11.367	9.867	42.534
20	(Hong Kong) Vanessa Wong	11.833	8.267	11.533	10.900	42.533
21	(India) Pranati Nayak	11.933	8.433	10.900	11.000	42.266
22	(Thailand) Senam Rakphu	11.000	6.233	7.667	11.100	36.000

=== Vault ===
Rank	Gymnast	Vault 1				Vault 2				Total
Rank	Gymnast	D Score	E Score	Pen.	Score 1	D Score	E Score	Pen.	Score 2	Total
1st place, gold medalist(s)	(South Korea) Yeo Seo-jeong	5.400	8.900		14.300	5.000	8.867		13.867	14.084
2nd place, silver medalist(s)	(Japan) Shoko Miyata	5.000	9.267		14.267	4.400	9.100		13.500	13.884
3rd place, bronze medalist(s)	(India) Pranati Nayak	5.200	8.667	–0.1	13.767	4.400	8.567		12.967	13.367
4	(Kazakhstan) Darya Yassinskaya	4.000	8.767		12.767	3.800	8.667		12.467	12.617
5	(Uzbekistan) Oksana Chusovitina	5.000	7.433		12.433	4.400	8.467	–0.1	12.767	12.600
6	(Kazakhstan) Korkem Yerbossynkyzy	3.800	8.967	–0.1	12.667	3.400	8.500	–0.1	11.800	12.234
7	(Chinese Taipei) Lai Pin-ju	4.200	8.200		12.400	3.400	8.567		11.967	12.184
8	(Thailand) Sasiwimon Mueangphuan	3.800	8.267	–0.1	11.967	4.200	7.500	–0.3	11.400	11.684

=== Uneven bars ===
Rank	Gymnast	D Score	E Score	Pen.	Total
1st place, gold medalist(s)	(China) Wei Xiaoyuan	6.400	8.367		14.767
2nd place, silver medalist(s)	(China) Tang Xijing	6.100	8.600		14.700
3rd place, bronze medalist(s)	(South Korea) Lee Yun-seo	6.300	8.133		14.433
4	(Japan) Arisa Kasahara	5.500	8.033		13.533
5	(Chinese Taipei) Mai Liu Hsiang-han	4.300	7.767		12.067
6	(Japan) Chiharu Yamada	5.500	6.567		12.067
7	(South Korea) Shin Sol-yi	5.100	6.767		11.867
8	(Chinese Taipei) Ting Hua-tien	4.000	5.767		9.767

=== Balance beam ===
Rank	Gymnast	D Score	E Score	Pen.	Total
1st place, gold medalist(s)	(China) Wu Ran	6.300	8.333		14.633
2nd place, silver medalist(s)	(Japan) Arisa Kasahara	5.700	8.133		13.833
3rd place, bronze medalist(s)	(China) Zhang Jin	5.400	8.300		13.700
4	(South Korea) Lee Yun-seo	5.200	7.867		13.067
5	(South Korea) Shin Sol-yi	5.800	6.933		12.733
6	(Chinese Taipei) Lai Pin-ju	5.300	7.367		12.667
7	(Japan) Shoko Miyata	5.300	7.267		12.567
8	(Kazakhstan) Aida Bauyrzhanova	5.000	6.833		11.833

=== Floor ===
Rank	Gymnast	D Score	E Score	Pen.	Total
1st place, gold medalist(s)	(China) Wu Ran	5.600	8.100		13.700
2nd place, silver medalist(s)	(Japan) Shoko Miyata	5.700	7.933		13.633
3rd place, bronze medalist(s)	(South Korea) Lee Yun-seo	5.200	8.067		13.267
4	(Uzbekistan) Dildora Aripova	5.000	8.200		13.200
5	(South Korea) Yeo Seo-jeong	5.500	7.600		13.100
6	(China) Zhang Jin	5.500	7.800	–0.3	13.000
7	(Chinese Taipei) Lai Pin-ju	4.600	7.233	–0.1	11.733
8	(Thailand) Sasiwimon Mueangphuan	4.600	6.767		11.367
