= Shoko Miyata =

Japanese artistic gymnast

- 宮田 笙子
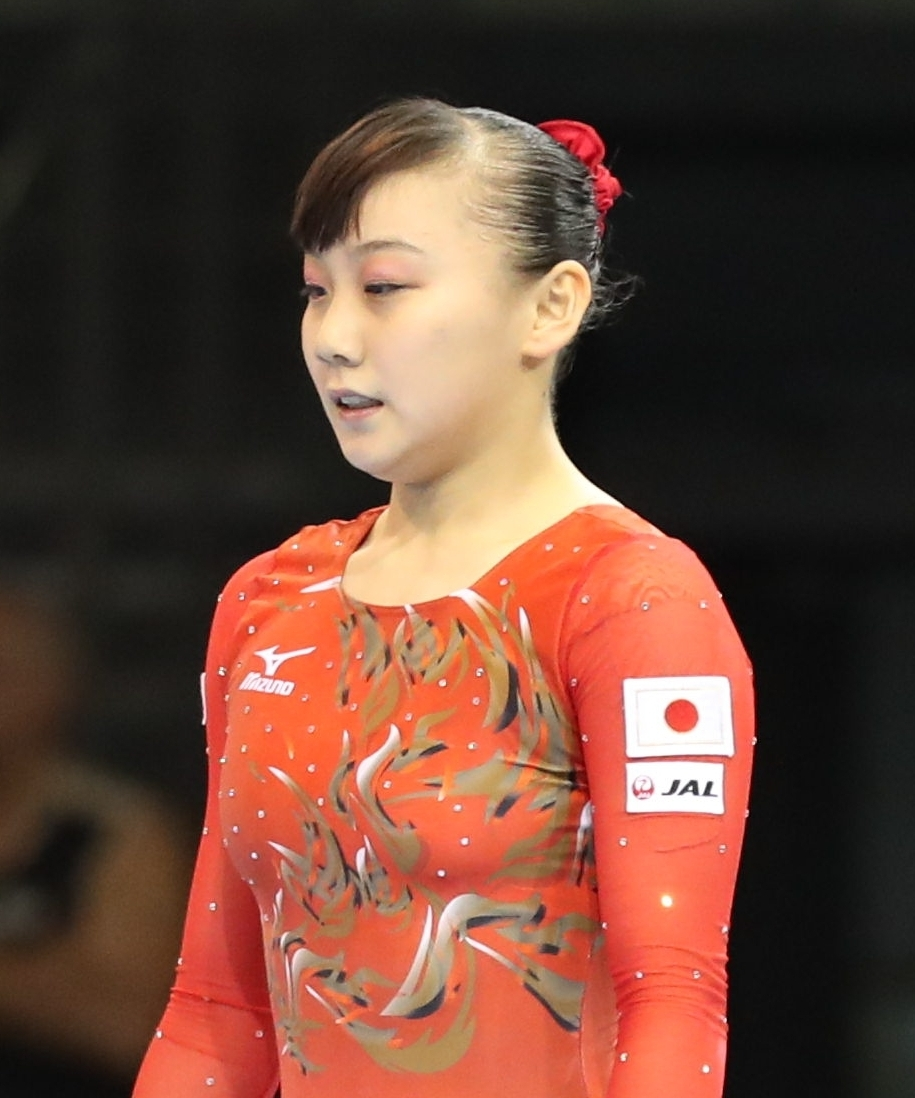
- Miyata at the 2019 Junior World Championships

Personal information
- Nickname: Shokomi
- Born: 21 September 2004 (age 21) Kyoto, Japan
- Height: 151 cm (4 ft 11 in)

Gymnastics career
- Discipline: Women's artistic gymnastics
- Country represented: Japan; (2018–present)
- Club: Juntendo University
- Head coach: Mutsumi Harada
Medal record
Women's artistic gymnastics
Representing Japan
World Championships
| Bronze medal – third place | 2022 Liverpool | Balance beam |
Asian Championships
| Silver medal – second place | 2022 Doha | Vault |
| Silver medal – second place | 2022 Doha | Floor exercise |
| Silver medal – second place | 2026 Zunyi | Team |
| Bronze medal – third place | 2022 Doha | Team |
| Bronze medal – third place | 2026 Zunyi | Vault |
World University Games
| Gold medal – first place | 2021 Chengdu | Vault |
| Gold medal – first place | 2025 Rhine-Ruhr | Team |
| Gold medal – first place | 2025 Rhine-Ruhr | All-around |
| Gold medal – first place | 2025 Rhine-Ruhr | Vault |
| Gold medal – first place | 2025 Rhine-Ruhr | Floor exercise |
| Silver medal – second place | 2021 Chengdu | Team |
| Bronze medal – third place | 2021 Chengdu | Floor exercise |
| Bronze medal – third place | 2025 Rhine-Ruhr | Uneven bars |
FIG World Cup
Event / 1st / 2nd / 3rd; Apparatus World Cup / 0 / 0 / 3

Shoko Miyata (宮田 笙子, Miyata Shōko; born 21 September 2004) is a Japanese artistic gymnast. She is the 2022 World bronze medalist on the balance beam as well as the 2022 Asian Championships silver medalist on vault and floor exercise. She was set to represent Japan at the 2024 Summer Olympics, but withdrew from the Games after she admitted to smoking and drinking in violation of team rules.

== Career ==
Miyata began training in gymnastics when she was four years old after following her older brother to a gymnastics class.

=== Junior ===
Miyata made her international debut at the 2018 International Gymnix competition in Montreal where she placed tenth in the all-around. In the event finals, she placed fifth on the vault and seventh on the balance beam. Later that year, she competed at the Junior Asian Championships where she helped Japan finish second in the team competition behind China. Individually, Miyata won bronze on vault behind Qi Qi of China and compatriot Ayumi Niiyama.

Miyata finished 28th in the all-around during the qualification round of the 2019 All-Japan Championships. She was selected to represent Japan at the inaugural Junior World Championships alongside Hazuki Watanabe and Chiaki Hatakeda. Together, they finished 11th as a team. Individually, Miyata finished 18th in the all-around and was the highest-placing Japanese female gymnast, and she was the first reserve for the vault final. She then placed 23rd in the all-around at the 2019 All-Japan Junior Championships.

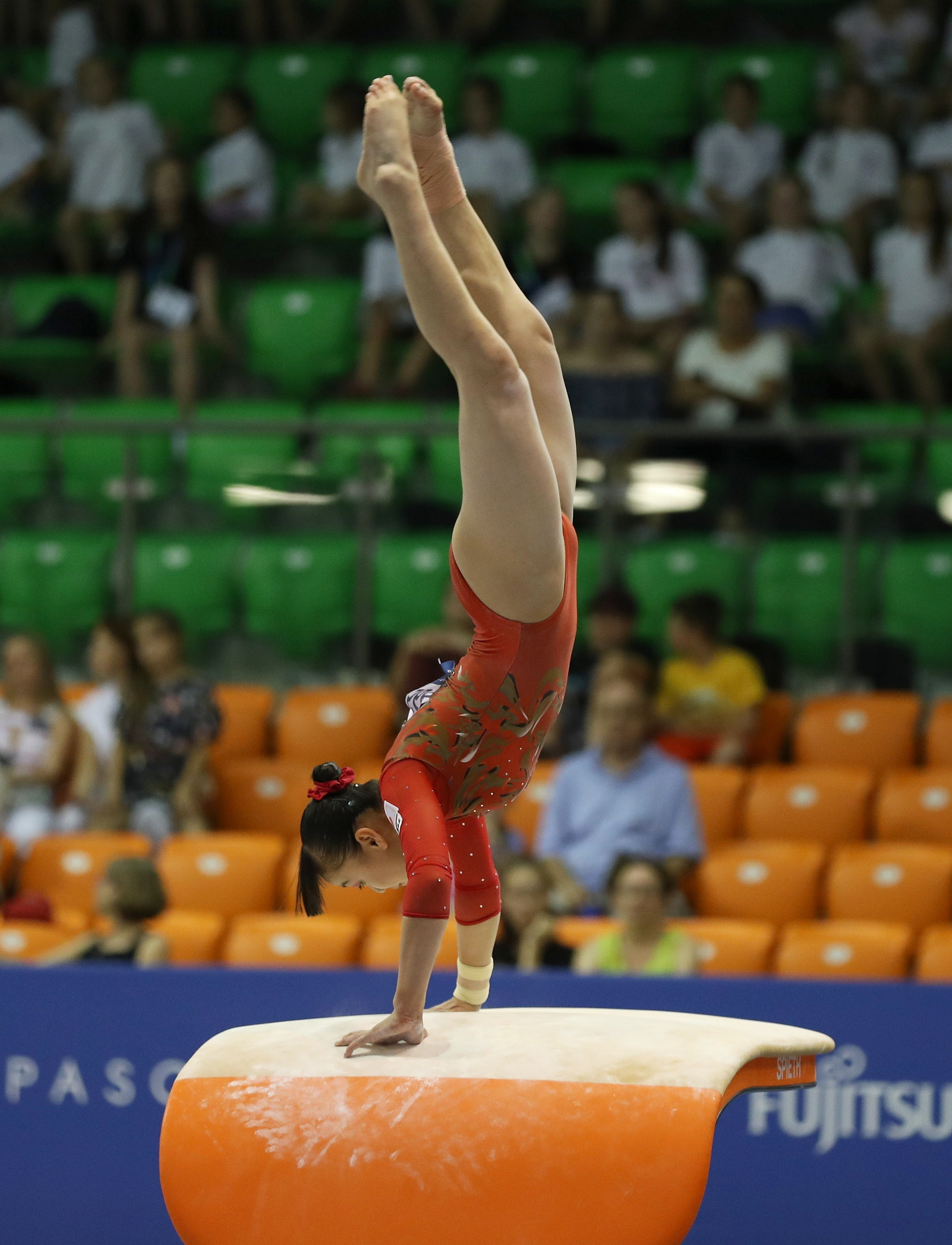
Vault

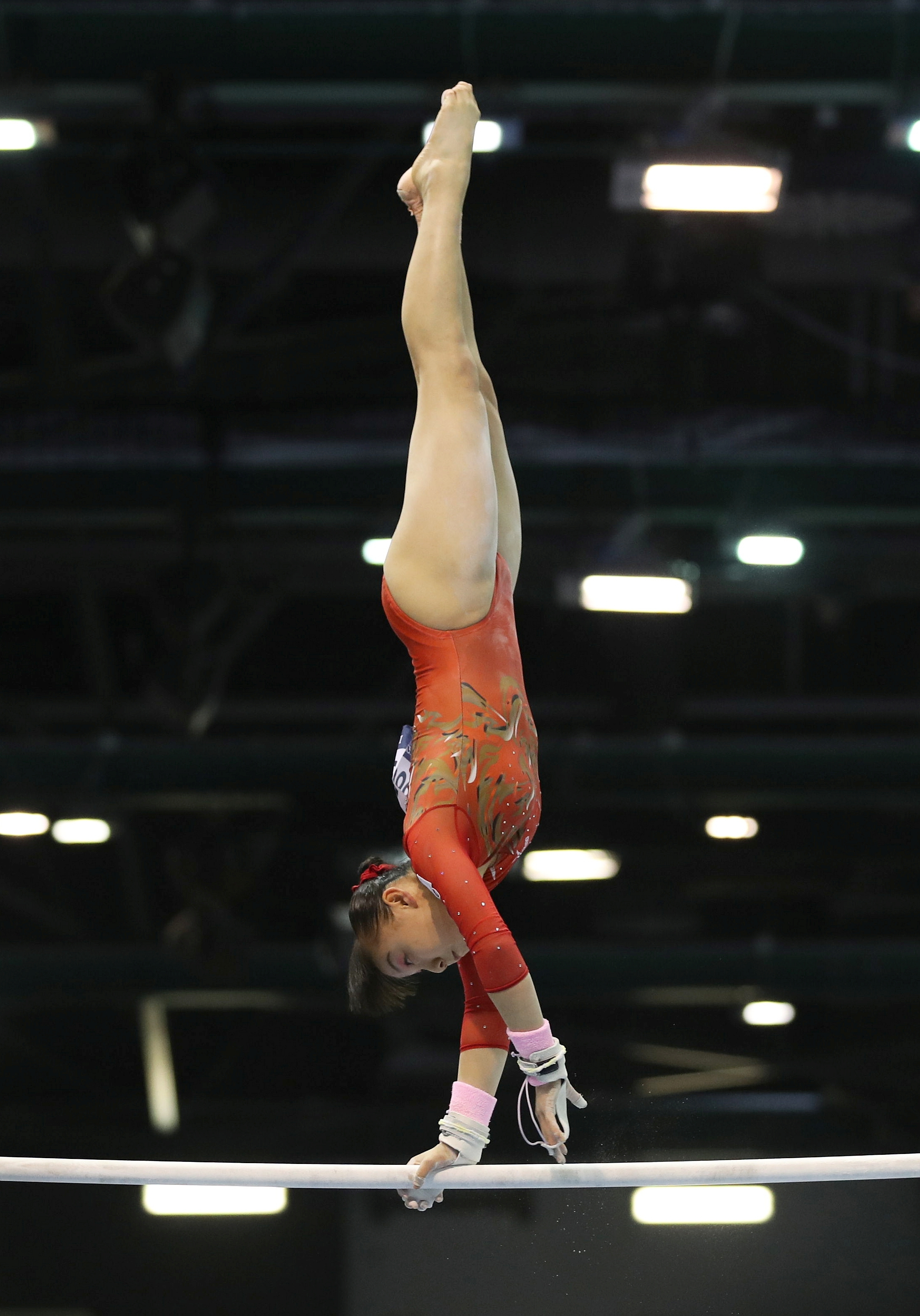
Uneven bars

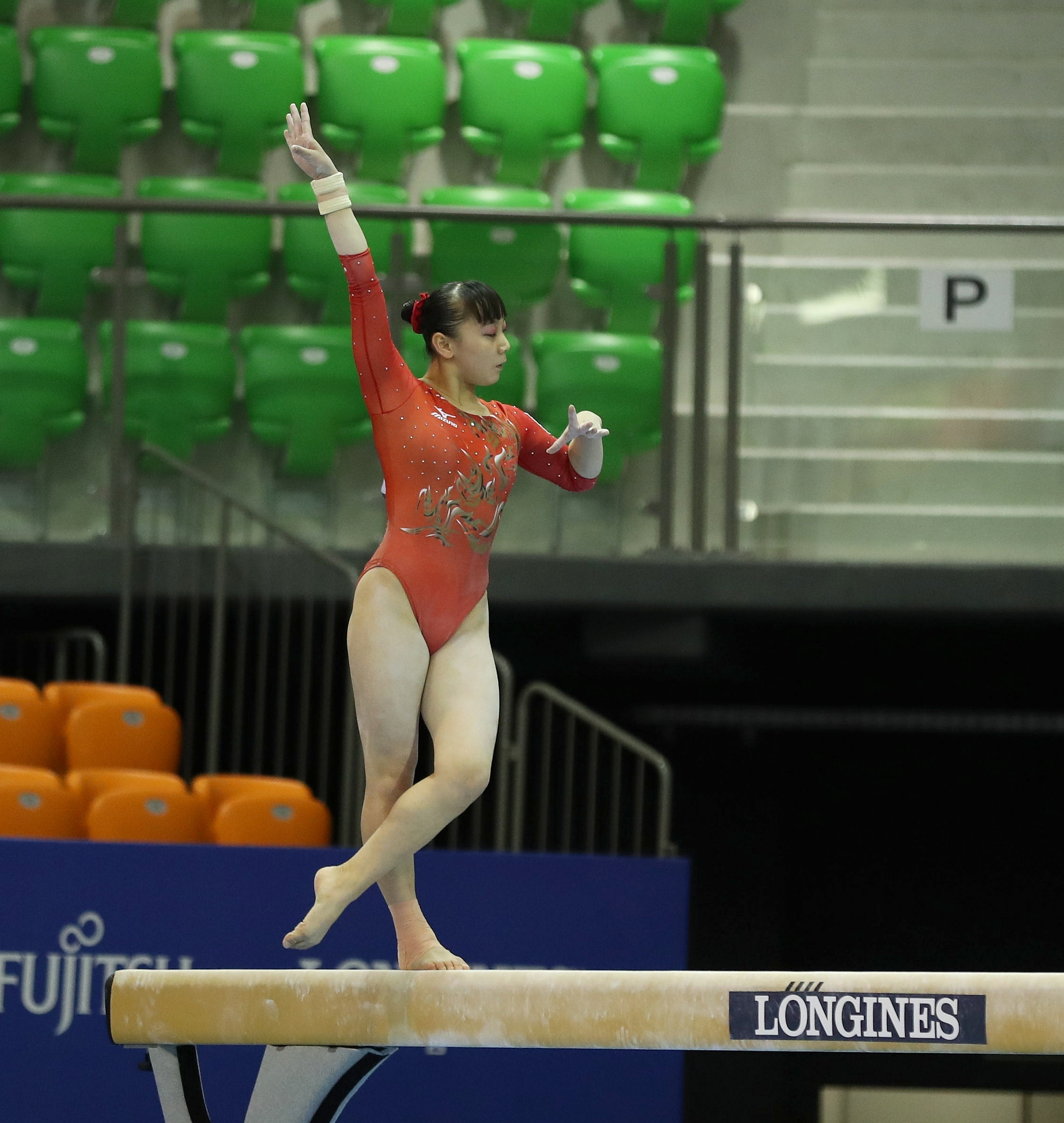
Balance beam

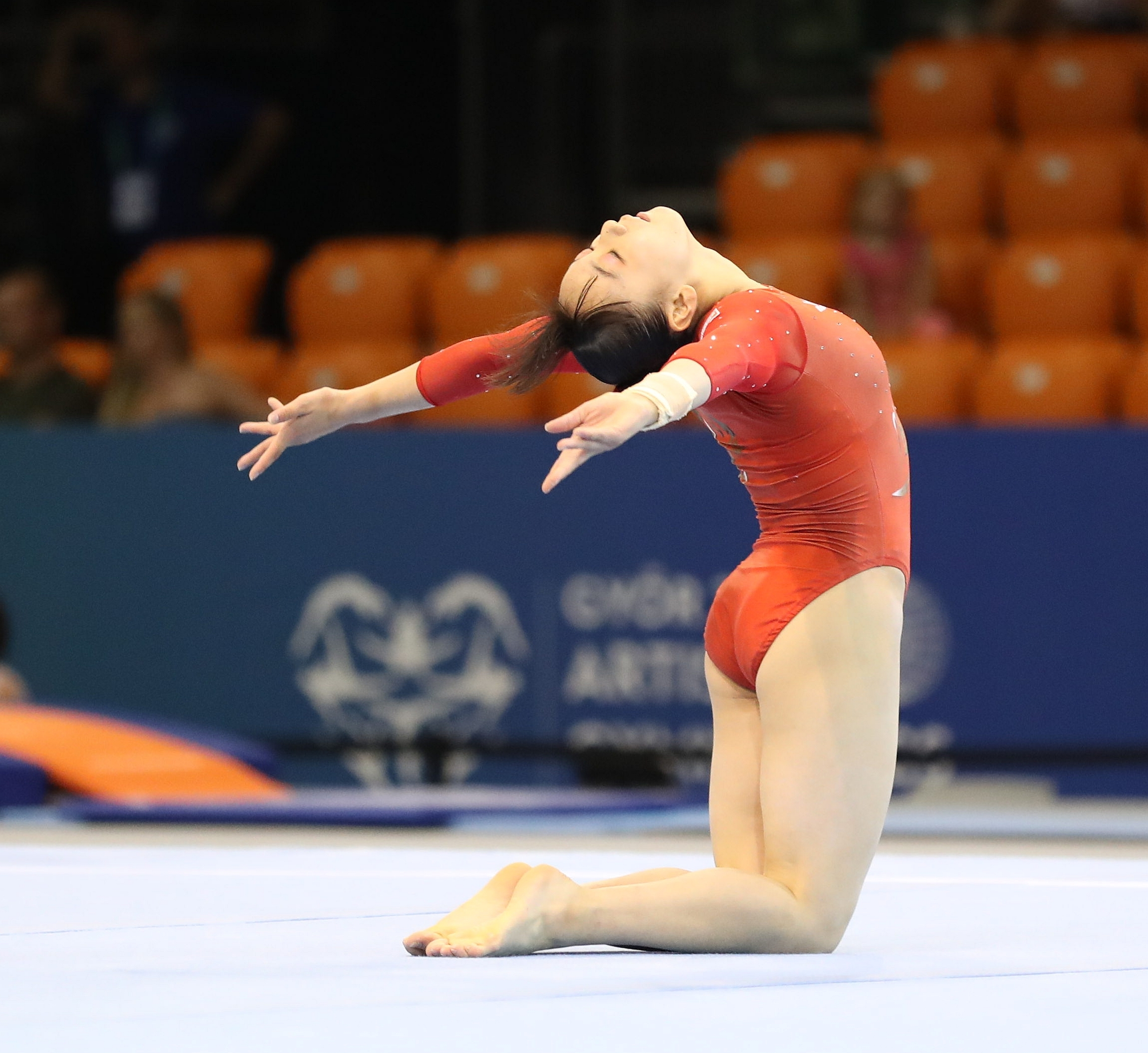
Floor exercise

Miyata at the 2019 Junior World Championships

=== Senior ===
==== 2020 ====
Miyata became age-eligible for senior international competitions in 2020 and made her senior international debut at the Melbourne World Cup. She finished third on vault behind Jade Carey and Coline Devillard. However, most other competitions were canceled or postponed due to the global COVID-19 pandemic. In September, she competed at the All-Japan Senior Championships and finished 10th in the all-around. Then in December, she placed 56th in the qualification round of the All-Japan Championships.

==== 2021 ====
Miyata finished 36th in the all-around during the qualification round of the All-Japan Championships. She then won a silver medal on the vault behind Mai Murakami at the All-Japan Event Championships. At the All-Japan Senior Championships, she won the all-around title and improved her score from the All-Japan Championships by over 5 points. She led her club to the bronze medal at the All-Japan Team Championships and had the highest score in the all-around.

==== 2022 ====
Miyata began the season with a second-place finish at the All-Japan Championships. She then won the all-around title at the NHK Trophy, becoming the first high schooler to win the women's event in seven years. At the Asian Championships, she helped Japan finish third as a team. Individually, she placed fourth in the all-around and won silver medals on the vault and floor exercise behind Yeo Seo-jeong and Wu Ran, respectively.

In late October, Miyata made her senior World Championships debut at the World Championships in Liverpool, qualifying for the all-around, vault, balance beam, and floor event finals. She contributed scores of 14.400 on vault, 13.233 on balance beam, and 13.700 on the floor exercise towards Japan's seventh place finish in the team final. She then finished eighth in the all-around final, fifth in the vault final, and eighth in the floor final. In the balance beam final, she scored 13.533 and won the bronze medal behind teammate Hazuki Watanabe and Canadian Ellie Black. After the World Championships, she led her team to the title at the All-Japan Team Championships.

==== 2023 ====
In April, Miyata graduated from high school and enrolled in Juntendo University and joined its gymnastics club. She competed at the All-Japan Championships despite a stress fracture in her right heel, and she finished second behind Hazuki Watanabe. She then won her second consecutive NHK Trophy title and was selected for the World Championships team. She won the vault title at the All-Japan Event Championships and placed seventh on the balance beam.

Miyata competed at the World University Games where she helped Japan finish second as a team behind China. She withdrew from the all-around final after the third rotation, but she still competed in the event finals. She won gold on vault, bronze on floor exercise, and placed fourth on balance beam. At the 2023 World Championships in Antwerp she helped Japan qualify for the team final, where they ended up in eighth place and secured an Olympic berth. Individually she qualified for the vault final, where she placed sixth. After the World Championships, she competed at the All-Japan Team Championships and helped her club place seventh.

==== 2024 ====
Miyata began the season with her first All-Japan Championships victory. In the lead up to the NHK Trophy, she injured her left groin, but still chose to compete. She won the gold medal in the all-around and was selected for the Japanese Olympic team alongside Rina Kishi, Haruka Nakamura, Mana Okamura, and Kohane Ushioku.

Miyata was forced to leave the Olympic team before the start of the Paris Games after allegations surfaced that she had been smoking, in violation of the team's conduct code. On 19 July 2024 the Japan Gymnastics Association announced that Miyata had admitted to smoking and drinking, and would be withdrawing from the Games. She was 19 at the time, which is under Japan's legal smoking and drinking age of 20. In December 2024 the association announced that Miyata would not face any penalties, saying that her decision to withdraw from the Olympics was punishment enough.

==== 2025 ====
Miyata competed at the All-Japan Championships and NHK Trophy, winning vault silver at both competitions. She was chosen to represent Japan at the 2025 Summer Universiade in Essen, Germany. She won gold in the team, all round, vault, and floor events, as well as bronze on uneven bars.

== Competitive history ==
Competitive history of Shoko Miyata at the junior level
| Year | Event | Team | AA | VT | UB | BB | FX |
|---|---|---|---|---|---|---|---|
| 2018 | International Gymnix | | 10 | 5 | | 7 | |
| 2018 | Junior Asian Championships | 2nd place, silver medalist(s) | | 3rd place, bronze medalist(s) | | | |
| 2018 | All-Japan Event Championships | | | 5 | | | |
| 2019 | All-Japan Championships | | 28 | | | | |
| 2019 | Junior World Championships | 11 | 18 | R1 | | | |
| 2019 | All-Japan Junior Championships | | 23 | | | | |

Competitive history of Shoko Miyata at the senior level
| Year | Event | Team | AA | VT | UB | BB | FX |
|---|---|---|---|---|---|---|---|
| 2020 | Melbourne World Cup | | | 3rd place, bronze medalist(s) | | | |
| 2020 | All-Japan Senior Championships | | 10 | 3rd place, bronze medalist(s) | | | |
| 2020 | All-Japan Championships | | 56 | | | | |
| 2021 | All-Japan Championships | | 36 | | | | |
| 2021 | All-Japan Event Championships | | | 2nd place, silver medalist(s) | | | |
| 2021 | All-Japan Senior Championships | | 1st place, gold medalist(s) | 1st place, gold medalist(s) | 2nd place, silver medalist(s) | 2nd place, silver medalist(s) | 2nd place, silver medalist(s) |
| 2021 | All-Japan Team Championships | 3rd place, bronze medalist(s) | 1st place, gold medalist(s) | 1st place, gold medalist(s) | | 3rd place, bronze medalist(s) | 1st place, gold medalist(s) |
| 2022 | All-Japan Championships | | 2nd place, silver medalist(s) | 1st place, gold medalist(s) | | | 2nd place, silver medalist(s) |
| 2022 | NHK Trophy | | 1st place, gold medalist(s) | 2nd place, silver medalist(s) | 2nd place, silver medalist(s) | | 2nd place, silver medalist(s) |
| 2022 | Asian Championships | 3rd place, bronze medalist(s) | 4 | 2nd place, silver medalist(s) | | 7 | 2nd place, silver medalist(s) |
| 2022 | World Championships | 7 | 8 | 5 | | 3rd place, bronze medalist(s) | 8 |
| 2022 | All-Japan Team Championships | 1st place, gold medalist(s) | 1st place, gold medalist(s) | 1st place, gold medalist(s) | | 1st place, gold medalist(s) | 1st place, gold medalist(s) |
| 2023 | All-Japan Championships | | 2nd place, silver medalist(s) | 2nd place, silver medalist(s) | | | |
| 2023 | NHK Trophy | | 1st place, gold medalist(s) | 2nd place, silver medalist(s) | | 3rd place, bronze medalist(s) | 1st place, gold medalist(s) |
| 2023 | All-Japan Event Championships | | | 1st place, gold medalist(s) | | 7 | |
| 2023 | World University Games | 2nd place, silver medalist(s) | DNF | 1st place, gold medalist(s) | | 4 | 3rd place, bronze medalist(s) |
| 2023 | World Championships | 8 | | 6 | | | |
| 2023 | All-Japan Team Championships | 7 | | | | | |
| 2024 | All-Japan Championships | | 1st place, gold medalist(s) | 1st place, gold medalist(s) | 2nd place, silver medalist(s) | | 3rd place, bronze medalist(s) |
| 2024 | NHK Trophy | | 1st place, gold medalist(s) | | | | |
| 2025 | All-Japan Championships | | 7 | 2nd place, silver medalist(s) | | | |
| 2025 | NHK Trophy | | 8 | 2nd place, silver medalist(s) | | | |
| 2025 | World University Games | 1st place, gold medalist(s) | 1st place, gold medalist(s) | 1st place, gold medalist(s) | 3rd place, bronze medalist(s) | | 1st place, gold medalist(s) |
| 2026 | Baku World Cup | | | 3rd place, bronze medalist(s) | | 3rd place, bronze medalist(s) | |
| 2026 | NHK Trophy | | 8 | | | | |
| 2026 | Asian Championships | 2nd place, silver medalist(s) | | 3rd place, bronze medalist(s) | | | |
