= Ryosuke Doi =

Japanese artistic gymnast

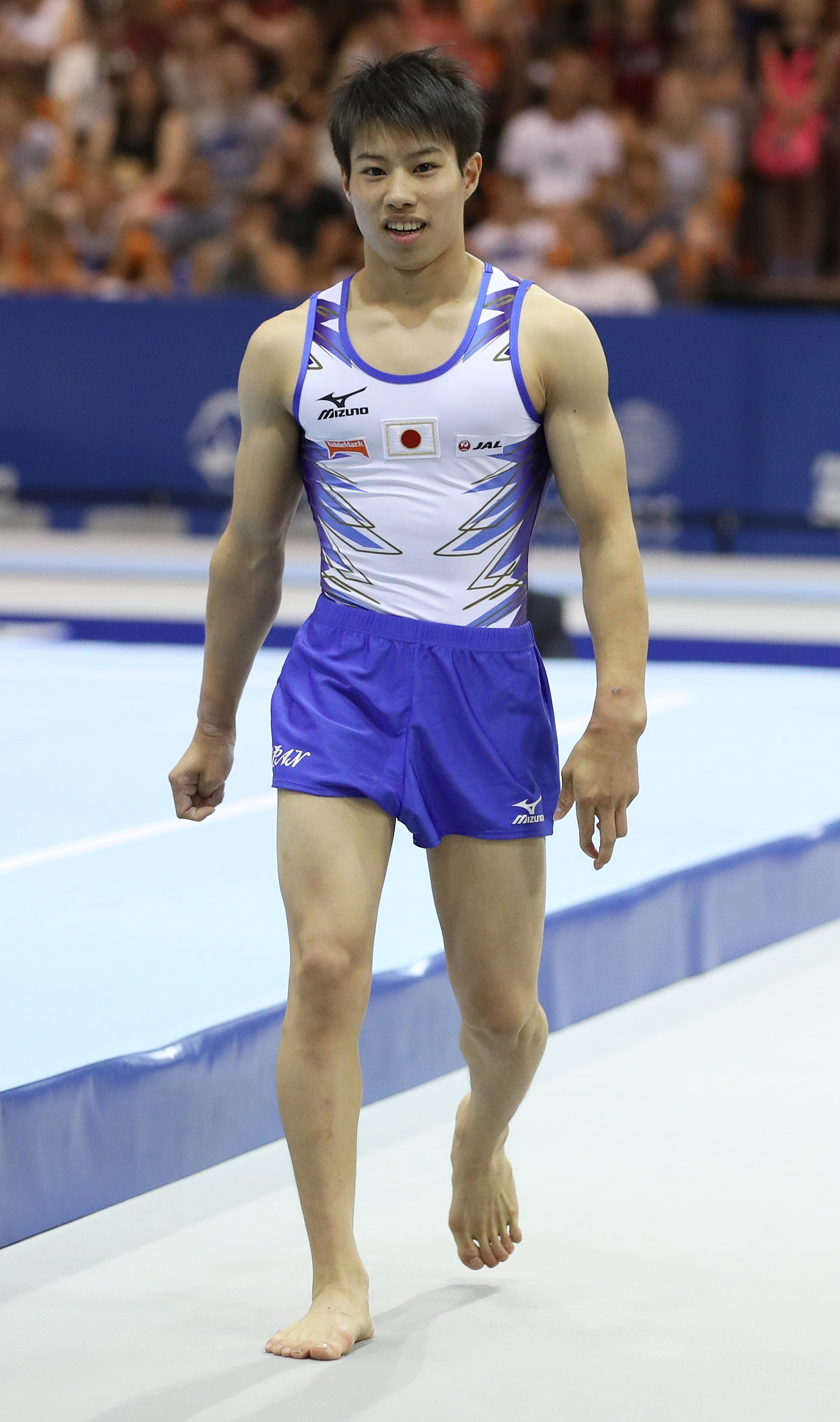
- Ryosuke Doi in 2019

Personal information
- Born: 7 January 2002 (age 24)

Gymnastics career
- Discipline: Men's artistic gymnastics
- Country represented: Japan
Medal record
Men's artistic gymnastics
Representing Japan
World Championships
Gold medal – first place	2026 Rotterdam	Team
Silver medal – second place	2022 Liverpool	Team
Bronze medal – third place	2022 Liverpool	Floor Exercise
Junior World Championships
Gold medal – first place	2019 Győr	Team
Silver medal – second place	2019 Győr	All-around

Ryosuke Doi (土井 陵輔, Doi Ryōsuke; born 7 January 2002) is a Japanese artistic gymnast. In 2019, he won the gold medal in the team event and the silver medal in the men's all-around event at the 2019 Junior World Artistic Gymnastics Championships held in Győr, Hungary. In the floor exercise he finished in 4th place.

In 2016, he won the silver medal in the junior men's floor exercise at the 2016 Pacific Rim Gymnastics Championships held in Everett, Washington, United States.
