= Hazuki Watanabe =

Japanese artistic gymnast (born 2004)

Hazuki Watanabe 渡部 葉月
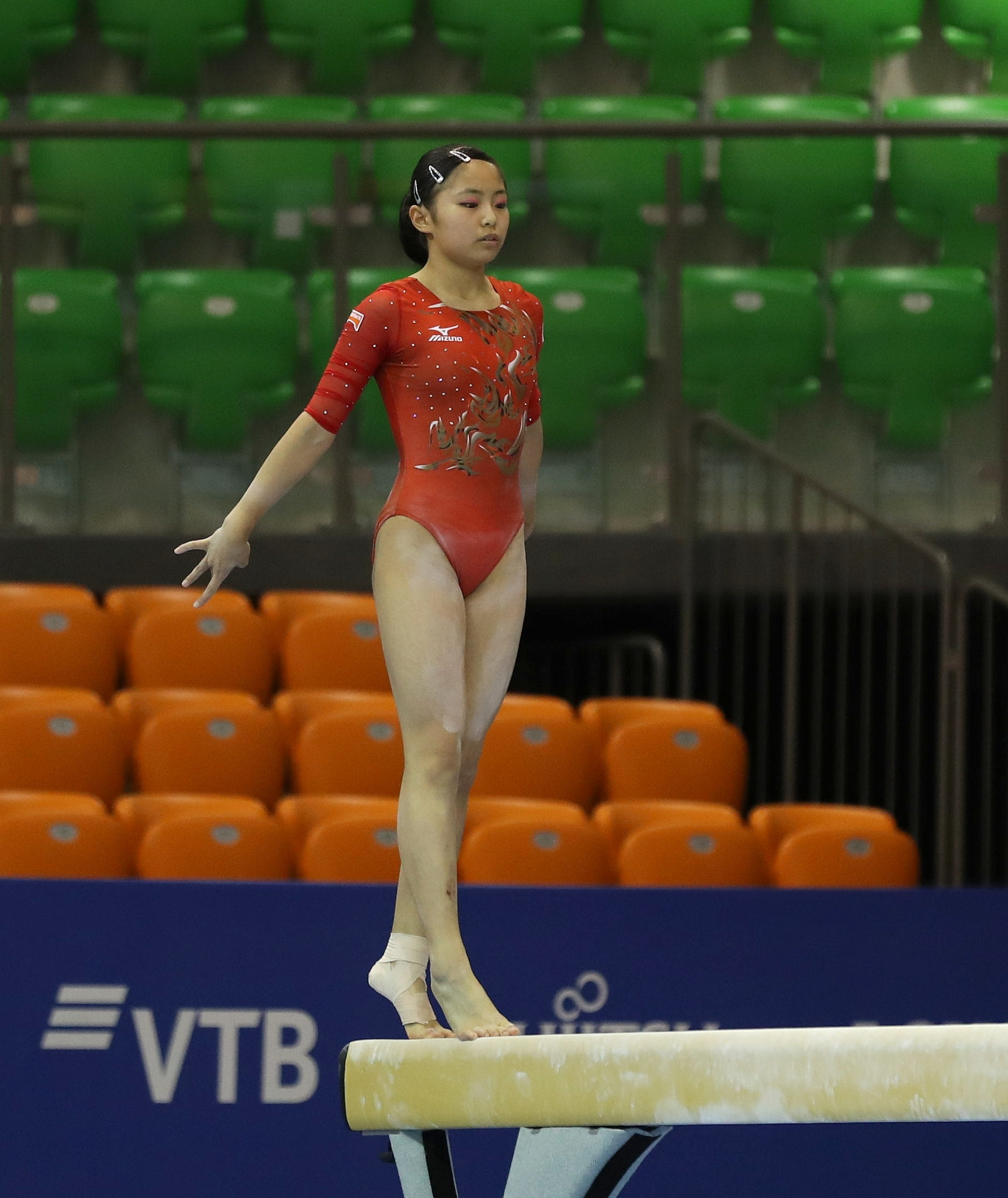
- Watanabe at the 2019 Junior World Championships

Personal information
- Nicknames: Ha-chan, Haki
- Born: 7 August 2004 (age 22) Mie Prefecture, Japan

Gymnastics career
- Discipline: Women's artistic gymnastics
- Country represented: Japan (2019–present)
- Club: Chukyo Gymnastics Club
- Head coach: Hikaru Tanaka
Medal record
Women's artistic gymnastics
Representing Japan
World Championships
Gold medal – first place	2022 Liverpool	Balance beam
Asian Championships
Bronze medal – third place	2022 Doha	Team

Hazuki Watanabe (渡部 葉月, born 7 August 2004) is a Japanese artistic gymnast. She is the 2022 World Champion on the balance beam. She was part of the bronze medal winning team at the 2022 Asian Championships. Additionally she represented Japan at the inaugural Junior World Championships.

== Early life ==
Watanabe was born in Mie, Japan in 2004.

== Career ==
=== 2019 ===
Watanabe competed at the 2019 City of Jesolo Trophy where she helped Japan finish fifth as a team. She was later selected to compete at the inaugural Junior World Championships alongside Shoko Miyata and Chiaki Hatakeda; they finished eleventh as a team.

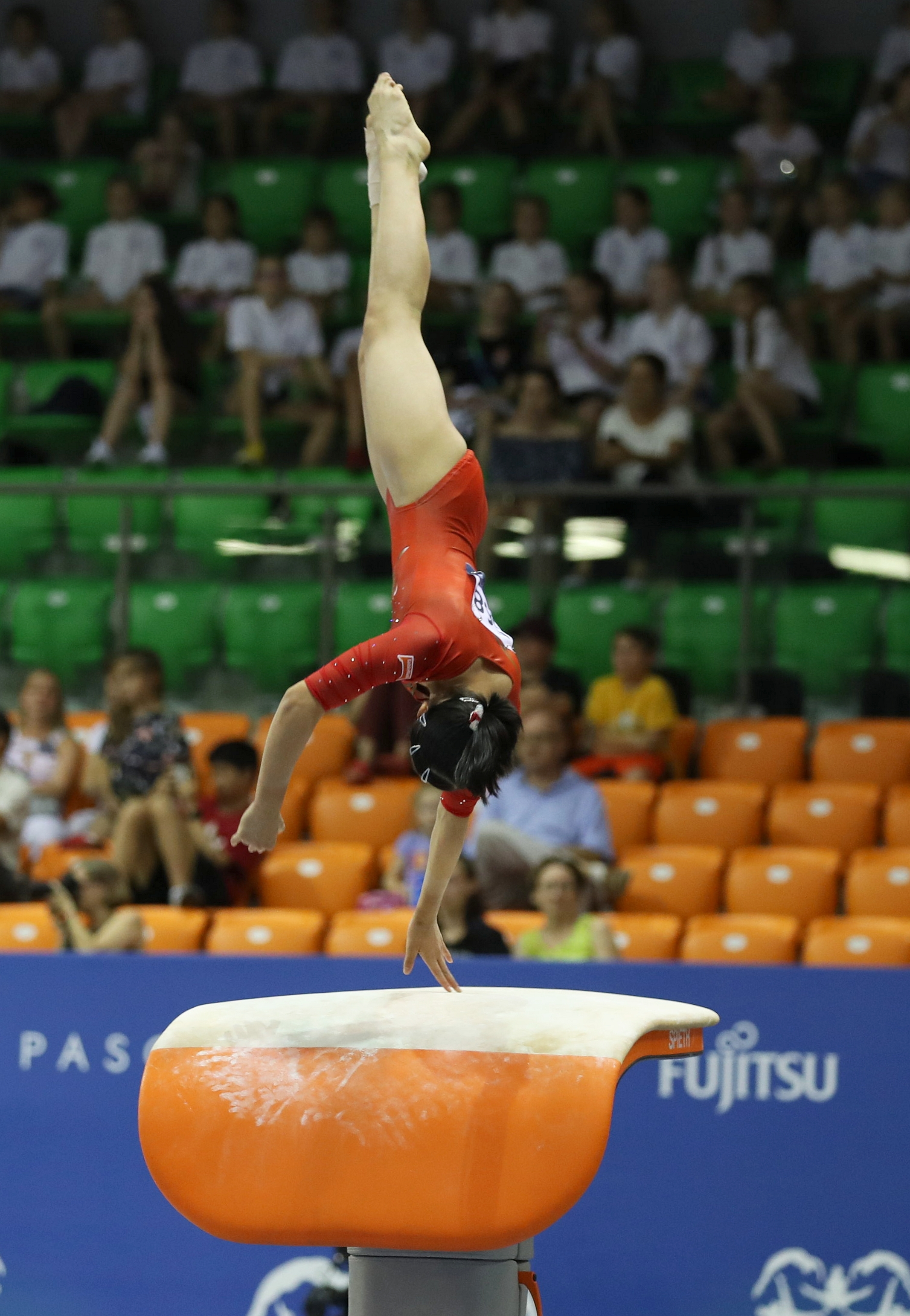
Vault

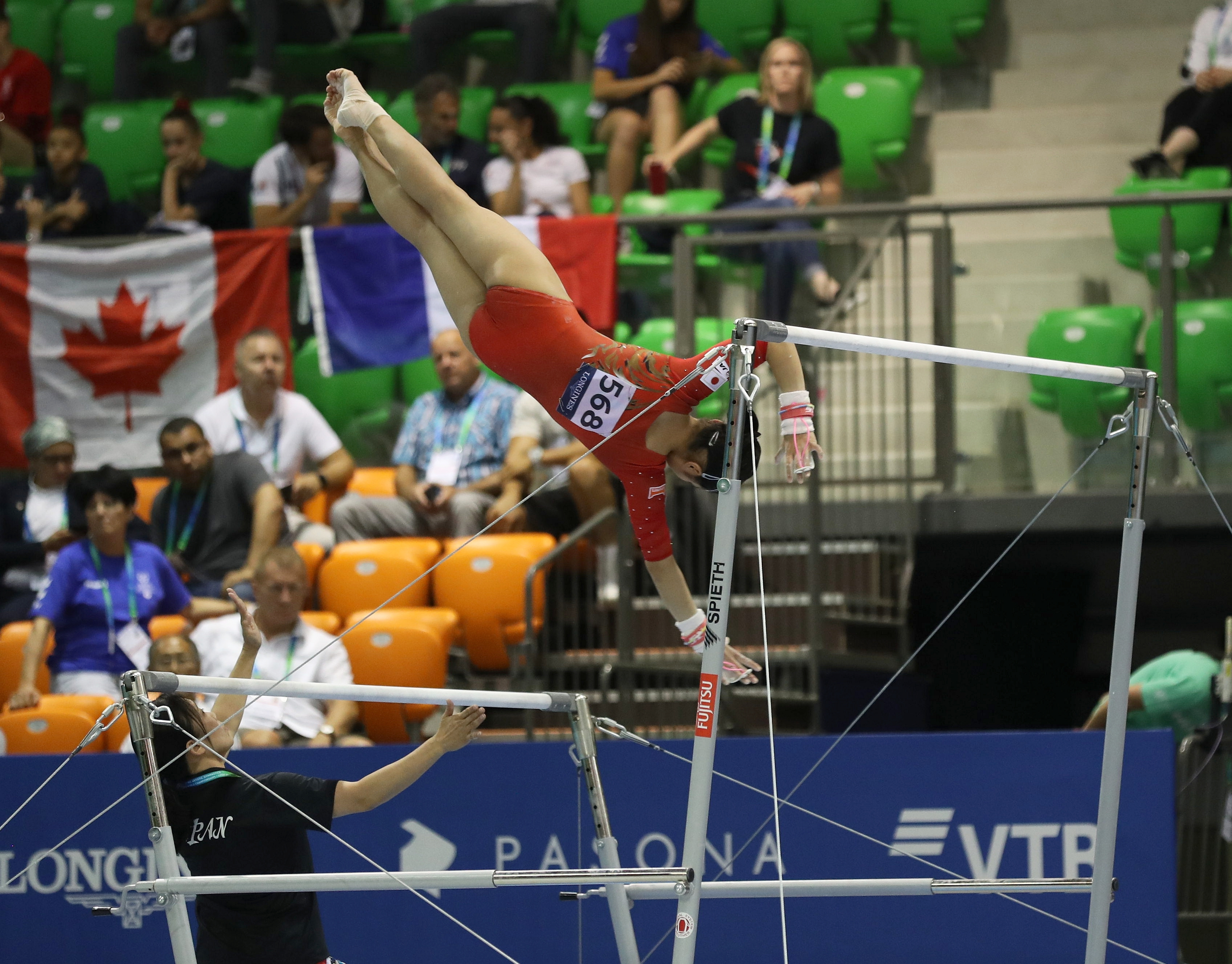
Uneven bars

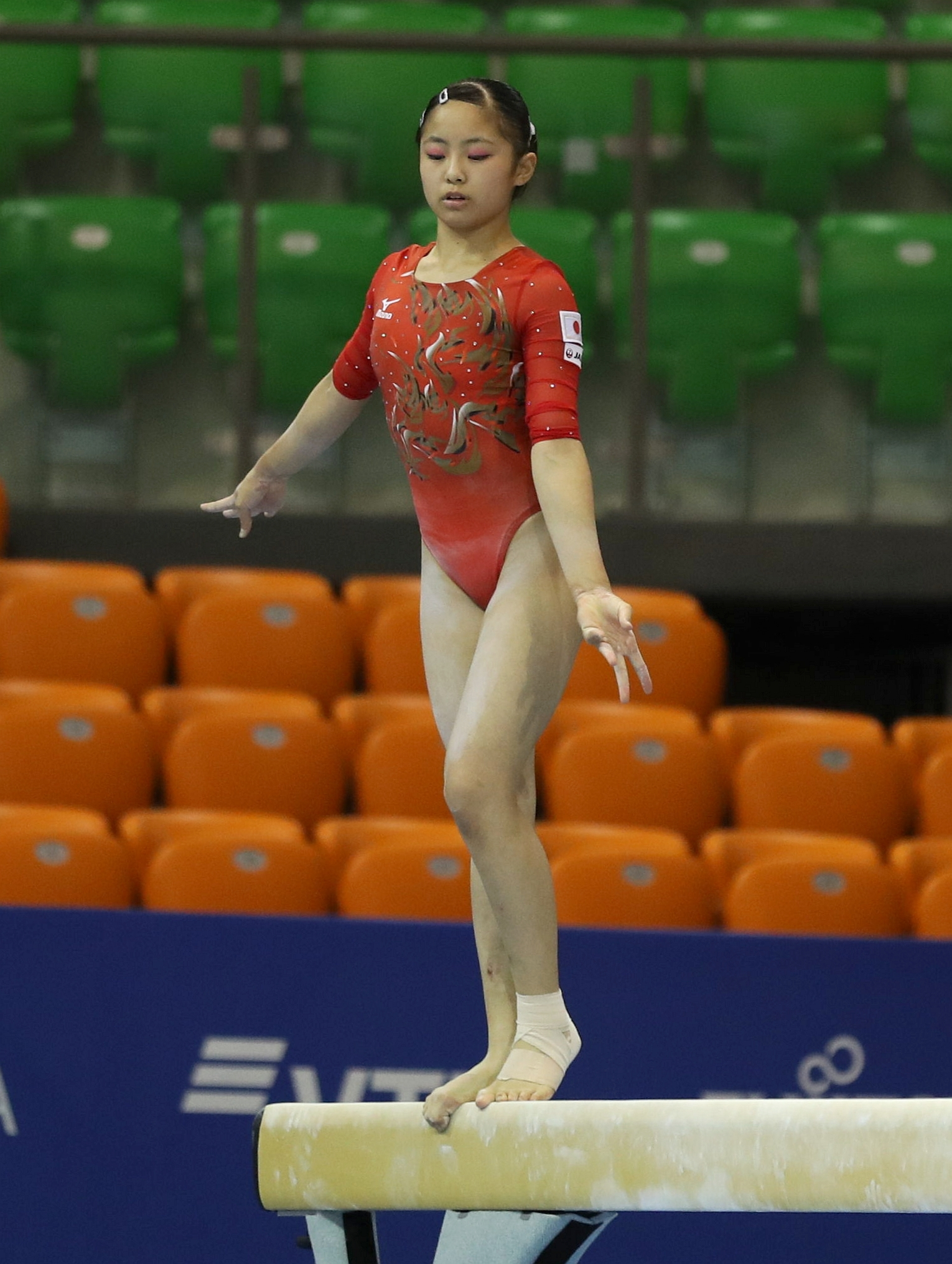
Balance beam

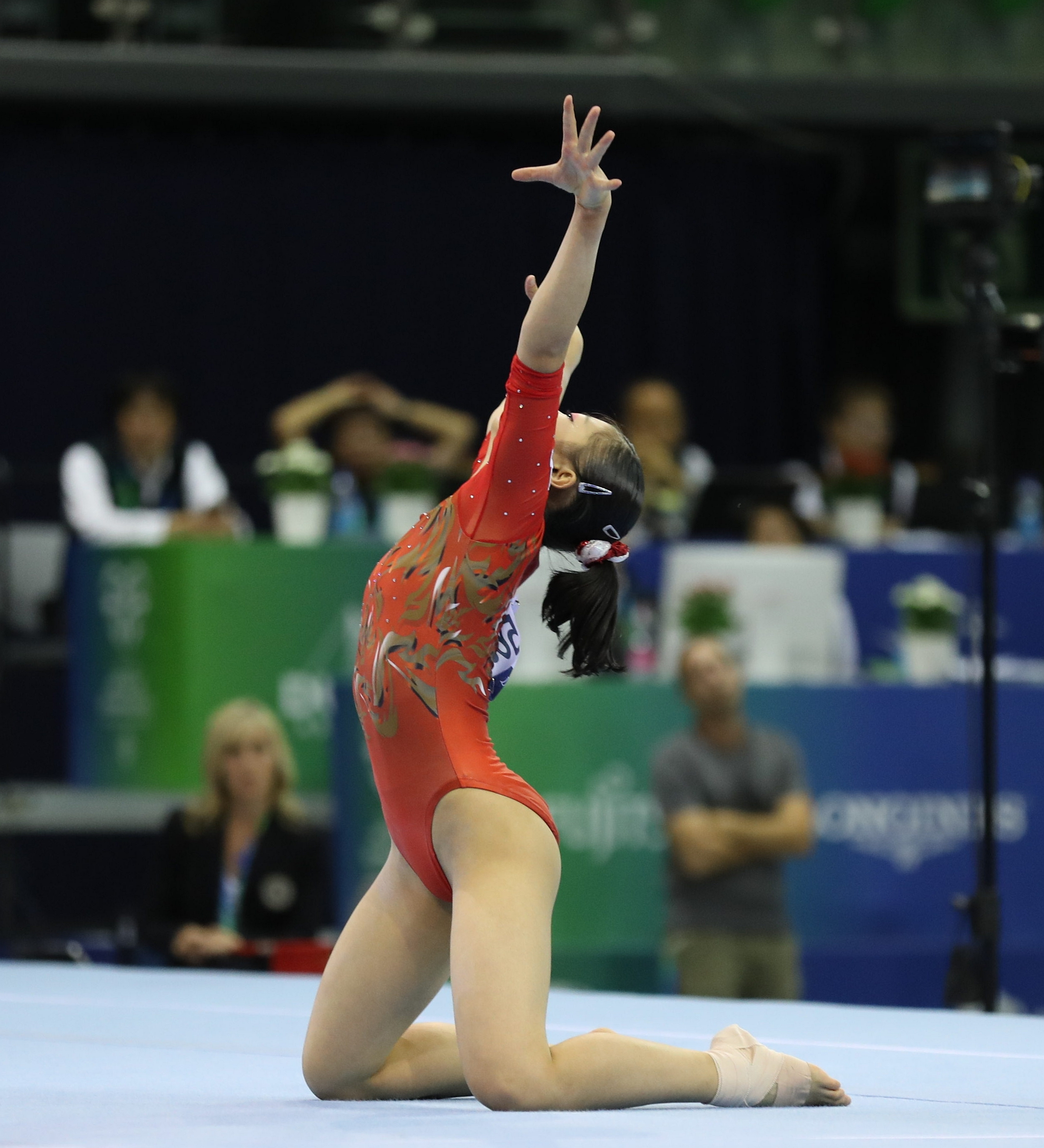
Floor exercise

Watanabe at the 2019 Junior World Championships

=== 2022 ===
Watanabe competed at the Asian Championships where she helped Japan finish third as a team. Later in the year Watanabe was selected to represent Japan at the 2022 World Championships alongside Shoko Miyata, Kokoro Fukasawa, Ayaka Sakaguchi, Chiharu Yamada, and Arisa Kasahara; she was initially the alternate. However, Kasahara later withdrew from the team due to injury and Watanabe was added to the main team. While at the World Championships, Watanabe helped Japan finish seventh as a team, and individually, she qualified for the balance beam final. During the balance beam final, Watanabe won gold, becoming the third Japanese gymnast to win the world title on balance beam, after Keiko Tanaka-Ikeda and Urara Ashikawa.

== Competitive history ==
Competitive history of Hazuki Watanabe
Year	Event	Team	AA	VT	UB	BB	FX
2019	City of Jesolo Trophy	5	13				
2019	All-Japan Championships		9				
2019	NHK Trophy		6				
2019	Junior World Championships	11					
2019	All-Japan Junior Championships		7				
2019	All-Japan Team Championships	7	3rd place, bronze medalist(s)				
2020	All-Japan Senior Championships		42				
2021	All-Japan Championships		22				
2021	NHK Trophy		21				
2021	All-Japan Event Championships					6	
2021	All-Japan Team Championships	13	5				
2022	All-Japan Championships		4				
2022	NHK Trophy		4				
2022	Asian Championships	3rd place, bronze medalist(s)					
2022	World Championships	7				1st place, gold medalist(s)	
2023	DTB Pokal Team Challenge	5					
2023	DTB Pokal Mixed Cup	1st place, gold medalist(s)					
2023	All-Japan Championships		1st place, gold medalist(s)				
2026	NHK Trophy		18				
