= 2022 World Artistic Gymnastics Championships =

Artistic gymnastics competition

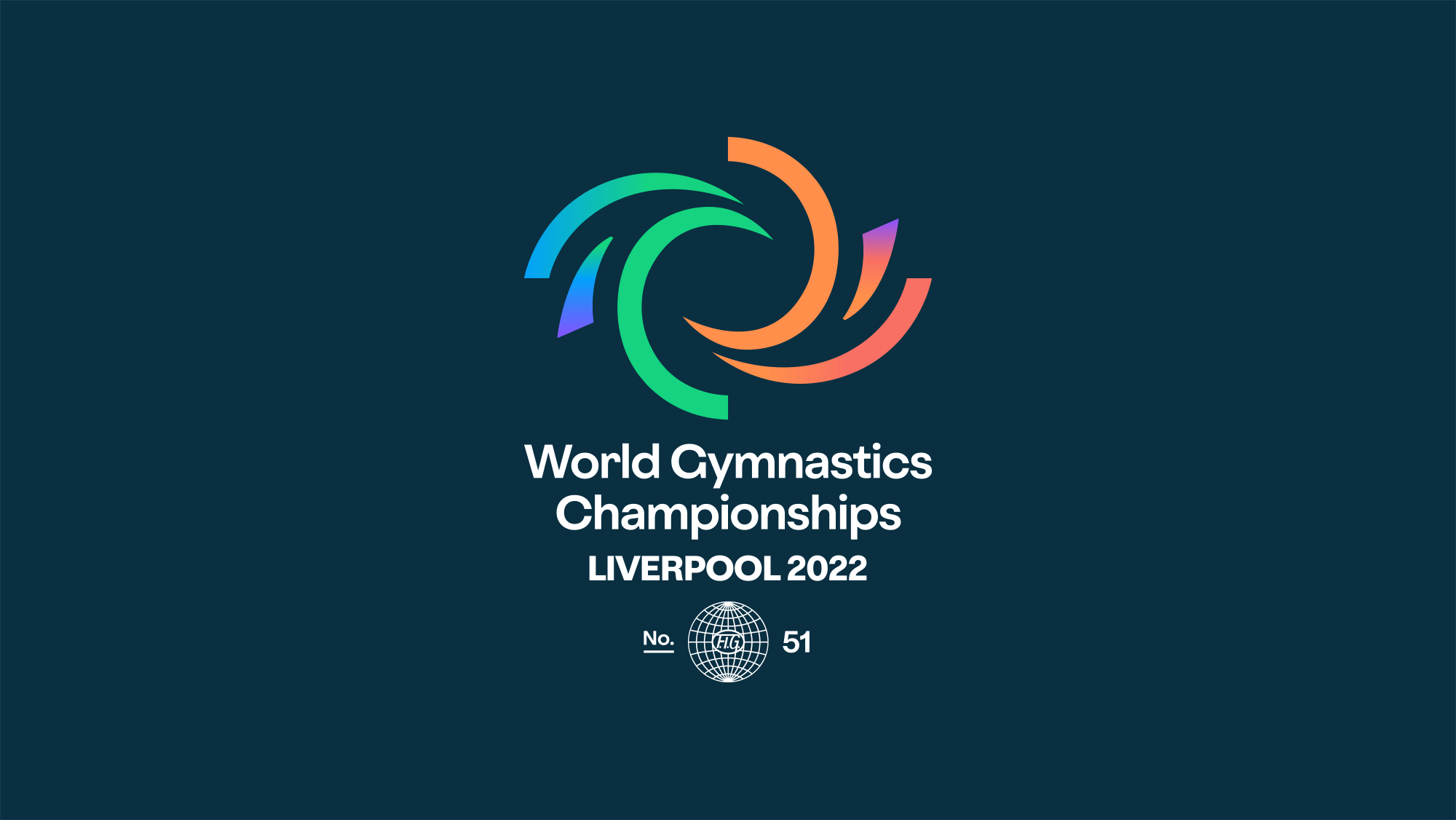
- Venue: Liverpool Arena
- Location: Liverpool, United Kingdom
- Start date: 29 October 2022
- End date: 6 November 2022
- Competitors: 407 (211 men, 196 women) from 72 nations

The 2022 World Artistic Gymnastics Championships were held in Liverpool, United Kingdom at the Liverpool Arena, from 29 October to 6 November 2022. The United Kingdom previously hosted this event in 1993 (Birmingham), 2009 (London) and 2015 (Glasgow).

The championships were a qualification event for the 2024 Olympic Games in Paris. The top three teams in both the men's and women's team finals obtained five quota places for Paris as a team.

== Competition schedule ==
Date	Session	Time	Subdivisions
Saturday, 29 October	Women's Qualification	8:00 PM	WAG: Subdivision 1 Apparatus Specialists Group 1, Apparatus Specialists Group 2, Belgium, United States
Saturday, 29 October	Women's Qualification	9:30 PM	WAG: Subdivision 2 All Around Group 12, Romania, All Around Group 7, Spain
Sunday, 30 October	Women's Qualification	9:30 AM	WAG: Subdivision 3 South Korea, All Around Group 1, All Around Group 14, Ukraine
Sunday, 30 October	Women's Qualification	11:00 AM	WAG: Subdivision 4 Sweden, Australia, All Around Group 9, Hungary
Sunday, 30 October	Women's Qualification	12:45 PM	WAG: Subdivision 5 All Around Group 10, Canada, China, All Around Group 5
Sunday, 30 October	Women's Qualification	2:15 PM	WAG: Subdivision 6 Mexico, France, All Around Group 2, All Around Group 13
Sunday, 30 October	Women's Qualification	5:00 PM	WAG: Subdivision 7 Finland, Netherland, All Around Group 8, Japan
Sunday, 30 October	Women's Qualification	6:30 PM	WAG: Subdivision 8 All Around Group 4, Argentina, Brazil, Germany
Sunday, 30 October	Women's Qualification	8:15 PM	WAG: Subdivision 9 All Around Group 3, Italy, Chinese Taipei, Egypt
Sunday, 30 October	Women's Qualification	9:45 PM	WAG: Subdivision 10; All Around Group 11, Great Britain, Austria, All Around Group 6
Monday, 31 October	Men's Qualification	9:30 AM	MAG: Subdivision 1 Austria, All Around Group 8, United States, Canada, All Around Group 5, Switzerland
Monday, 31 October	Men's Qualification	11:30 AM	MAG: Subdivision 2 Kazakhstan, All Around Group 6, South Korea, All Around Group 2, Great Britain, China
Monday, 31 October	Men's Qualification	1:50 PM	MAG: Subdivision 3 Spain, Japan, All Around Group 10, All Around Group 3, Ukraine, Romania
Monday, 31 October	Men's Qualification	3:50 PM	MAG: Subdivision 4 Netherland, Italy, Apparatus Specialists Group 2, Colombia, Brazil, Apparatus Specialists Group 1
Monday, 31 October	Men's Qualification	7:00 PM	MAG: Subdivision 5 Turkey, Egypt, Germany, Chinese Taipei, All Around Group 7, All Around Group 9
Monday, 31 October	Men's Qualification	9:00 PM	MAG: Subdivision 6 Belgium, All Around Group 4, Australia, France, Hungary, All Around Group 1
Tuesday, 1 November	Women's Team Final	6:30 PM	Top 8 from qualification
Wednesday, 2 November	Men's Team Final	5:40 PM	Top 8 from qualification
Thursday, 3 November	Women's Individual All-Around Final	6:45 PM	Top 24 from qualification
Friday, 4 November	Men's Individual All-Around Final	6:00 PM	Top 24 from qualification
Saturday, 5 November	Apparatus Finals	1:30 PM	MAG: Floor, Pommel horse, Rings
Saturday, 5 November	Apparatus Finals	1:30 PM	WAG: Vault, Uneven bars
Sunday, 6 November	Apparatus Finals	1:30 PM	MAG: Vault, Parallel bars, Horizontal bar
Sunday, 6 November	Apparatus Finals	1:30 PM	WAG: Balance beam, Floor
Listed in local time (UTC±00:00). (Note: WAG qualifications on 29 October are in BST (UTC+01:00) as daylight savings ended in the UK on 30 October.)

== Medal summary ==
=== Medalists ===
Names italicised denote the team alternate.

Event	Gold	Silver	Bronze
Men
Team	China; Sun Wei; Yang Jiaxing; You Hao; Zhang Boheng; Zou Jingyuan; Su Weide	Japan; Ryosuke Doi; Daiki Hashimoto; Yuya Kamoto; Kakeru Tanigawa; Wataru Tanigawa; Kazuma Kaya	Great Britain; Joe Fraser; James Hall; Jake Jarman; Giarnni Regini-Moran; Courtney Tulloch; Adam Tobin
Individual all-around	(Japan) Daiki Hashimoto	(China) Zhang Boheng	(Japan) Wataru Tanigawa
Floor	(United Kingdom) Giarnni Regini-Moran	(Japan) Daiki Hashimoto	(Japan) Ryosuke Doi
Pommel horse	(Republic of Ireland) Rhys McClenaghan	(Jordan) Ahmad Abu Al-Soud	(Armenia) Harutyun Merdinyan
Rings	(Turkey) Adem Asil	(China) Zou Jingyuan	(United Kingdom) Courtney Tulloch
Vault	(Armenia) Artur Davtyan	(Philippines) Carlos Yulo	(Ukraine) Igor Radivilov
Parallel bars	(China) Zou Jingyuan	(Germany) Lukas Dauser	(Philippines) Carlos Yulo
Horizontal bar	(United States) Brody Malone	(Japan) Daiki Hashimoto	(Brazil) Arthur Mariano
Women
Team	United States; Skye Blakely; Jade Carey; Jordan Chiles; Shilese Jones; Leanne Wong; Lexi Zeiss	Great Britain; Ondine Achampong; Georgia-Mae Fenton; Jennifer Gadirova; Jessica Gadirova; Alice Kinsella; Poppy-Grace Stickler	Canada; Ellie Black; Laurie Denommée; Denelle Pedrick; Emma Spence; Sydney Turner; Shallon Olsen
Individual all-around	(Brazil) Rebeca Andrade	(United States) Shilese Jones	(United Kingdom) Jessica Gadirova
Vault	(United States) Jade Carey	(United States) Jordan Chiles	(France) Coline Devillard
Uneven bars	(China) Wei Xiaoyuan	(United States) Shilese Jones	(Belgium) Nina Derwael
Balance beam	(Japan) Hazuki Watanabe	(Canada) Ellie Black	(Japan) Shoko Miyata
Floor	(United Kingdom) Jessica Gadirova	(United States) Jordan Chiles	(Brazil) Rebeca Andrade (United States) Jade Carey

=== Medal standings ===
==== Overall ====
* Host nation (Great Britain)

Rank	Nation	Gold	Silver	Bronze	Total
1	United States	3	4	1	8
2	China	3	2	0	5
3	Japan	2	3	3	8
4	Great Britain*	2	1	3	6
5	Brazil	1	0	2	3
6	Armenia	1	0	1	2
7	Ireland	1	0	0	1
7	Turkey	1	0	0	1
9	Canada	0	1	1	2
9	Philippines	0	1	1	2
11	Germany	0	1	0	1
11	Jordan	0	1	0	1
13	Belgium	0	0	1	1
13	France	0	0	1	1
13	Ukraine	0	0	1	1
Totals (15 entries)		14	14	15	43

==== Men ====
* Host nation (Great Britain)

Rank	Nation	Gold	Silver	Bronze	Total
1	China	2	2	0	4
2	Japan	1	3	2	6
3	Great Britain*	1	0	2	3
4	Armenia	1	0	1	2
5	Ireland	1	0	0	1
5	Turkey	1	0	0	1
5	United States	1	0	0	1
8	Philippines	0	1	1	2
9	Germany	0	1	0	1
9	Jordan	0	1	0	1
11	Brazil	0	0	1	1
11	Ukraine	0	0	1	1
Totals (12 entries)		8	8	8	24

==== Women ====
* Host nation (Great Britain)

Rank	Nation	Gold	Silver	Bronze	Total
1	United States	2	4	1	7
2	Great Britain*	1	1	1	3
3	Brazil	1	0	1	2
3	Japan	1	0	1	2
5	China	1	0	0	1
6	Canada	0	1	1	2
7	Belgium	0	0	1	1
7	France	0	0	1	1
Totals (8 entries)		6	6	7	19

== Men's results ==
=== Team ===
Rank	Team	Floor (gymnastics)	Pommel horse	Rings (gymnastics)	Vault (gymnastics)	Parallel bars	Horizontal bar	Total
1st place, gold medalist(s)	China	42.332 (3)	41.032 (1)	43.632 (1)	43.332 (1)	44.998 (1)	42.532 (1)	257.858
1st place, gold medalist(s)	Sun Wei	13.866	13.633		13.833		14.666	257.858
1st place, gold medalist(s)	Yang Jiaxing	14.200	13.433		14.533		13.433	257.858
1st place, gold medalist(s)	You Hao			14.633		14.866		257.858
1st place, gold medalist(s)	Zhang Boheng	14.266	13.966	14.133	14.966	14.366	14.433	257.858
1st place, gold medalist(s)	Zou Jingyuan			14.866		15.766		257.858
2nd place, silver medalist(s)	Japan	43.366 (1)	38.466 (2)	42.199 (4)	43.332 (1)	43.999 (2)	42.033 (2)	253.395
2nd place, silver medalist(s)	Ryosuke Doi	14.366	13.033		14.700		14.700	253.395
2nd place, silver medalist(s)	Daiki Hashimoto	14.500	14.433	13.866	13.866		13.133	253.395
2nd place, silver medalist(s)	Yuya Kamoto			14.233		14.766	14.200	253.395
2nd place, silver medalist(s)	Wataru Tanigawa			14.100	14.766	14.933		253.395
2nd place, silver medalist(s)	Kakeru Tanigawa	14.500	11.000			14.300		253.395
3rd place, bronze medalist(s)	Great Britain	42.799 (2)	35.232 (6)	42.299 (2)	42.833 (4)	43.266 (3)	40.800 (4)	247.229
3rd place, bronze medalist(s)	Joe Fraser		10.466	14.033		15.000	14.000	247.229
3rd place, bronze medalist(s)	James Hall	14.200	12.200	13.600		14.033	13.700	247.229
3rd place, bronze medalist(s)	Jake Jarman	14.433	12.566		13.733		13.100	247.229
3rd place, bronze medalist(s)	Giarnni Regini-Moran	14.166			14.600	14.233		247.229
3rd place, bronze medalist(s)	Courtney Tulloch			14.666	14.500			247.229
4	Italy	41.766 (5)	38.366 (3)	39.499 (7)	42.933 (3)	42.065 (7)	41.336 (3)	245.995
4	Yumin Abbadini	13.733	12.300	13.033			13.633	245.995
4	Nicola Bartolini	14.333	12.766		14.600	13.866		245.995
4	Lorenzo Minh Casali	13.700		13.300	14.533	13.933		245.995
4	Carlo Macchini		13.300				14.300	245.995
4	Matteo Levantesi			13.166	13.800	14.266	13.433	245.995
5	United States	40.265 (8)	38.265 (5)	42.265 (3)	42.833 (4)	42.865 (4)	39.199 (7)	245.692
5	Asher Hong	13.933	13.566	14.033	14.533	14.533		245.692
5	Brody Malone	12.866	11.733	13.766	14.400	13.966	14.366	245.692
5	Stephen Nedoroscik		12.966					245.692
5	Colt Walker				13.900	14.366	11.700	245.692
5	Donnell Whittenburg	13.466		14.466			13.133	245.692
6	Spain	41.765 (6)	38.299 (4)	40.900 (5)	41.299 (8)	42.265 (5)	39.499 (6)	244.027
6	Néstor Abad		11.633	13.800			13.133	244.027
6	Thierno Diallo		13.533			14.266		244.027
6	Nicolau Mir	13.866			14.100	13.733	12.466	244.027
6	Joel Plata	13.966	13.133	13.500	14.666	14.266	13.900	244.027
6	Rayderley Zapata	13.933		13.600	12.533			244.027
7	Brazil	41.932 (4)	33.900 (7)	39.932 (6)	42.799 (6)	42.233 (6)	40.566 (5)	241.362
7	Lucas Bitencourt		10.600	12.966		13.633		241.362
7	Yuri Guimarães	14.366			13.733			241.362
7	Arthur Mariano	13.700			14.566		12.866	241.362
7	Diogo Soares		11.900	13.033		14.000	13.800	241.362
7	Caio Souza	13.866	11.400	13.933	14.500	14.600	13.900	241.362
8	South Korea	40.299 (7)	31.566 (8)	38.766 (8)	42.232 (7)	40.932 (8)	39.033 (8)	232.828
8	Kim Jae-ho	13.400	12.333		14.266	13.733	13.033	232.828
8	Kim Han-sol	13.133			13.666			232.828
8	Lee Jun-ho			13.166	14.300		12.700	232.828
8	Lee Jung-hyo		10.300	12.400		13.466		232.828
8	Ryu Sung-hyun	13.766	8.933	13.200		13.733	13.300	232.828

=== Individual all-around ===
Rank	Gymnast	Floor (gymnastics)	Pommel horse	Rings (gymnastics)	Vault (gymnastics)	Parallel bars	Horizontal bar	Total
1st place, gold medalist(s)	(Japan) Daiki Hashimoto	14.666	14.333	13.866	14.900	15.000	14.433	87.198
2nd place, silver medalist(s)	(China) Zhang Boheng	14.033	14.233	14.100	14.900	15.066	14.433	86.765
3rd place, bronze medalist(s)	(Japan) Wataru Tanigawa	14.266	13.766	13.833	15.000	14.766	13.600	85.231
4	(United States) Brody Malone	14.133	13.766	13.666	14.500	14.366	14.500	84.931
5	(United Kingdom) Jake Jarman	14.433	13.333	13.000	14.800	14.166	13.133	82.865
6	(United States) Asher Hong	14.266	13.700	13.833	14.166	14.900	11.500	82.365
7	(Ukraine) Illia Kovtun	14.000	13.933	12.666	14.300	14.600	12.866	82.365
8	(Philippines) Carlos Yulo	15.166	11.900	13.800	14.166	15.166	11.900	82.098
9	(Chinese Taipei) Tang Chia-hung	14.133	13.033	13.366	14.000	13.366	14.066	81.964
10	(Brazil) Caio Souza	13.766	12.766	13.700	12.700	14.566	14.133	81.631
11	(Germany) Lukas Dauser	13.666	13.200	12.900	13.766	15.166	12.900	81.598
12	(Netherlands) Casimir Schmidt	14.000	12.733	13.800	14.233	13.733	13.000	81.499
13	(Italy) Lorenzo Minh Casali	12.966	12.833	13.100	14.233	14.333	12.866	80.331
14	(Hungary) Krisztofer Mészáros	13.700	12.600	13.066	13.700	14.066	12.833	79.965
15	(Hungary) Krisztián Balázs	12.833	12.700	12.866	13.200	14.433	13.800	79.832
16	(Spain) Néstor Abad	13.800	11.266	13.233	13.733	14.200	13.433	79.665
17	(Brazil) Diogo Soares	12.766	13.433	12.900	14.266	12.433	13.866	79.664
18	(Spain) Joel Plata	14.333	11.533	13.233	14.700	12.766	13.033	79.598
19	(Norway) Sofus Heggemsnes	12.766	12.700	12.766	14.466	13.300	12.933	78.931
20	(Belgium) Luka van den Keybus	13.333	10.566	12.800	14.133	14.066	13.366	78.264
21	(Italy) Yumin Abbadini	13.566	13.666	13.166	13.866	13.066	9.900	77.230
22	(United Kingdom) Joe Fraser	13.866	13.166	13.600	12.833	11.533	12.100	77.098
23	(Romania) Gabriel Burtănete	13.100	10.166	13.133	14.500	13.400	12.600	76.899
24	(Colombia) Jossimar Calvo	13.166	10.400	11.566	14.400	12.366	13.500	75.398

- (Turkey) Adem Asil withdrew and was replaced in the third rotation group by first reserve (Spain) Néstor Abad.
- (South Korea) Ryu Sung-hyun withdrew and was replaced in the third rotation group by reserve (Hungary) Krisztofer Mészáros.

=== Floor ===
Rank	Gymnast	D Score	E Score	Pen.	Total
1st place, gold medalist(s)	(United Kingdom) Giarnni Regini-Moran	6.200	8.333		14.533
2nd place, silver medalist(s)	(Japan) Daiki Hashimoto	6.000	8.500		14.500
3rd place, bronze medalist(s)	(Japan) Ryosuke Doi	6.200	8.166	-0.10	14.266
4	(France) Benjamin Osberger	5.600	8.633		14.233
5	(Italy) Nicola Bartolini	5.900	8.333		14.233
6	(South Korea) Ryu Sung-hyun	5.900	8.300		14.200
7	(Philippines) Carlos Yulo	6.200	7.100		13.300
8	(Kazakhstan) Milad Karimi	6.000	6.100		12.100

- (China) Zhang Boheng withdrew and was replaced by first reserve (France) Benjamin Osberger.

=== Pommel horse ===
Rank	Gymnast	D Score	E Score	Pen.	Total
1st place, gold medalist(s)	(Republic of Ireland) Rhys McClenaghan	6.400	8.900		15.300
2nd place, silver medalist(s)	(Jordan) Ahmad Abu Al-Soud	6.300	8.566		14.866
3rd place, bronze medalist(s)	(Armenia) Harutyun Merdinyan	6.100	8.633		14.733
4	(Kazakhstan) Nariman Kurbanov	6.300	8.233		14.533
5	(United States) Stephen Nedoroscik	6.200	8.200		14.400
6	(Netherlands) Loran de Munck	6.400	7.133		13.533
7	(Japan) Ryosuke Doi	6.100	6.833		12.933
8	(Croatia) Filip Ude	5.700	6.800		12.500

=== Rings ===
Rank	Gymnast	D Score	E Score	Pen.	Total
1st place, gold medalist(s)	(Turkey) Adem Asil	6.300	8.633		14.933
2nd place, silver medalist(s)	(China) Zou Jingyuan	6.300	8.566		14.866
3rd place, bronze medalist(s)	(United Kingdom) Courtney Tulloch	6.100	8.633		14.733
4	(Armenia) Artur Avetisyan	6.000	8.600		14.600
5	(China) You Hao	6.700	7.900		14.600
6	(Armenia) Vahagn Davtyan	6.000	8.533		14.533
7	(Japan) Yuya Kamoto	6.400	8.066		14.466
8	(United States) Donnell Whittenburg	6.000	8.433		14.433

=== Vault ===
Rank	Gymnast	Vault 1				Vault 2				Total
Rank	Gymnast	D Score	E Score	Pen.	Score 1	D Score	E Score	Pen.	Score 2	Total
1st place, gold medalist(s)	(Armenia) Artur Davtyan	5.600	9.500	-0.10	15.000	5.600	9.500		15.100	15.050
2nd place, silver medalist(s)	(Philippines) Carlos Yulo	6.000	9.100	-0.10	15.000	5.600	9.300		14.900	14.950
3rd place, bronze medalist(s)	(Ukraine) Igor Radivilov	5.600	9.200		14.800	5.600	9.066		14.666	14.733
4	(Romania) Gabriel Burtănete	5.600	9.066		14.666	5.600	8.800		14.400	14.533
5	(Brazil) Caio Souza	5.600	8.733		14.333	5.600	8.900		14.500	14.416
6	(South Korea) Lee Jun-ho	5.600	8.866		14.466	5.200	8.966		14.166	14.316
7	(Japan) Wataru Tanigawa	5.600	8.666	-0.10	14.166	4.800	9.033		13.833	13.999
8	(South Korea) Kim Han-sol	5.600	9.300		14.900	5.200	8.000	-0.30	12.900	13.900

=== Parallel bars ===
Rank	Gymnast	D Score	E Score	Pen.	Total
1st place, gold medalist(s)	(China) Zou Jingyuan	6.900	9.266		16.166
2nd place, silver medalist(s)	(Germany) Lukas Dauser	6.600	8.900		15.500
3rd place, bronze medalist(s)	(Philippines) Carlos Yulo	6.300	9.066		15.366
4	(Turkey) Ferhat Arican	6.600	8.466		15.066
5	(Colombia) Jossimar Calvo	6.700	8.266		14.966
6	(Japan) Yuya Kamoto	6.500	8.400		14.900
7	(United Kingdom) Giarnni Regini-Moran	6.400	8.333		14.733
8	(United Kingdom) Joe Fraser	6.500	8.200		14.700

=== Horizontal bar ===
Rank	Gymnast	D Score	E Score	Pen.	Total
1st place, gold medalist(s)	(United States) Brody Malone	6.300	8.500		14.800
2nd place, silver medalist(s)	(Japan) Daiki Hashimoto	6.400	8.300		14.700
3rd place, bronze medalist(s)	(Brazil) Arthur Mariano	6.000	8.466		14.466
4	(China) Sun Wei	6.400	8.033		14.433
5	(China) Zhang Boheng	6.200	8.200		14.400
6	(Cyprus) Ilias Georgiou	5.900	8.400		14.300
7	(Japan) Yuya Kamoto	6.000	8.166		14.166
8	(Australia) Tyson Bull	5.900	7.866		13.766

== Women's results ==
=== Team ===
Rank	Team	Vault (gymnastics)	Uneven bars	Balance beam	Floor (gymnastics)	Total
1st place, gold medalist(s)	United States	43.133 (1)	42.199 (1)	39.399 (3)	41.833 (1)	166.564
1st place, gold medalist(s)	Jordan Chiles	14.400	14.100	13.333	14.000	166.564
1st place, gold medalist(s)	Shilese Jones	13.933	14.333		13.733	166.564
1st place, gold medalist(s)	Jade Carey	14.800		12.800	14.100	166.564
1st place, gold medalist(s)	Leanne Wong		13.766			166.564
1st place, gold medalist(s)	Skye Blakely			13.266		166.564
2nd place, silver medalist(s)	Great Britain	42.699 (2)	40.533 (4)	39.299 (4)	40.832 (2)	163.363
2nd place, silver medalist(s)	Alice Kinsella	14.133	14.100	12.266	13.133	163.363
2nd place, silver medalist(s)	Jessica Gadirova	14.200	12.800		14.266	163.363
2nd place, silver medalist(s)	Ondine Achampong	14.366		13.700		163.363
2nd place, silver medalist(s)	Georgia-Mae Fenton		13.633	13.333		163.363
2nd place, silver medalist(s)	Jennifer Gadirova				13.433	163.363
3rd place, bronze medalist(s)	Canada	41.699 (4)	40.099 (5)	39.632 (2)	39.133 (5)	160.563
3rd place, bronze medalist(s)	Ellie Black	14.200	14.033	13.833	13.100	160.563
3rd place, bronze medalist(s)	Sydney Turner		13.633	13.566	13.100	160.563
3rd place, bronze medalist(s)	Emma Spence	13.633	12.433	12.233		160.563
3rd place, bronze medalist(s)	Denelle Pedrick	13.866				160.563
3rd place, bronze medalist(s)	Laurie Denommée				12.933	160.563
4	Brazil	41.465 (6)	41.499 (3)	37.332 (7)	39.365 (4)	159.661
4	Rebeca Andrade	15.166	14.633	12.833	14.066	159.661
4	Carolyne Pedro	13.166		11.966	12.466	159.661
4	Lorrane Oliveira	13.133	13.200			159.661
4	Júlia Soares			12.533	12.833	159.661
4	Flávia Saraiva		13.666			159.661
5	Italy	41.632 (5)	39.366 (7)	39.766 (1)	38.699 (6)	159.463
5	Martina Maggio	13.866	11.700	12.900	13.966	159.463
5	Alice D'Amato	14.300	13.500		13.133	159.463
5	Manila Esposito	13.466		13.133	11.600	159.463
5	Giorgia Villa		14.166	13.733		159.463
5	Veronica Mandriota					159.463
6	China	40.199 (8)	41.966 (2)	37.366 (6)	37.998 (8)	157.529
6	Tang Xijing	13.133	12.833	10.700	12.166	157.529
6	Ou Yushan	13.133		14.266	12.966	157.529
6	Luo Rui		14.400	12.400		157.529
6	Zhang Jin	13.933			12.866	157.529
6	Wei Xiaoyuan		14.733			157.529
7	Japan	42.200 (3)	35.832 (8)	38.999 (5)	39.933 (3)	156.964
7	Shoko Miyata	14.400		13.233	13.700	156.964
7	Ayaka Sakaguchi	14.200		13.000	13.200	156.964
7	Chiharu Yamada		13.666	12.766	13.033	156.964
7	Kokoro Fukasawa	13.600	9.400			156.964
7	Hazuki Watanabe		12.766			156.964
8	France	41.400 (7)	39.465 (6)	36.499 (8)	38.499 (7)	155.863
8	Mélanie de Jesus dos Santos	13.700	13.066	11.200	13.366	155.863
8	Carolann Héduit	14.000	13.433	11.633		155.863
8	Marine Boyer			13.666	13.133	155.863
8	Aline Friess		12.966		12.000	155.863
8	Coline Devillard	13.700				155.863

=== Individual all-around ===
Rank	Gymnast	Vault (gymnastics)	Uneven bars	Balance beam	Floor (gymnastics)	Total
1st place, gold medalist(s)	(Brazil) Rebeca Andrade	15.166	13.800	13.533	14.400	56.899
2nd place, silver medalist(s)	(United States) Shilese Jones	14.233	14.366	13.100	13.700	55.399
3rd place, bronze medalist(s)	(United Kingdom) Jessica Gadirova	13.833	13.233	13.733	14.400	55.199
4	(United Kingdom) Alice Kinsella	14.166	14.166	13.100	13.633	55.065
5	(Canada) Ellie Black	14.033	13.933	13.433	13.333	54.732
6	(United States) Jade Carey	14.733	13.166	12.633	14.166	54.698
7	(China) Ou Yushan	13.100	13.200	13.866	13.733	53.899
8	(Japan) Shoko Miyata	14.233	12.866	12.966	13.733	53.798
9	(Italy) Martina Maggio	14.033	12.800	13.033	13.866	53.732
10	(Italy) Alice D'Amato	14.166	13.266	12.533	13.066	53.031
11	(Belgium) Lisa Vaelen	14.200	13.800	11.333	13.366	52.699
12	(Australia) Georgia Godwin	13.766	13.500	12.400	13.033	52.699
13	(Finland) Maisa Kuusikko	13.500	13.300	12.466	12.733	51.999
14	(Japan) Chiharu Yamada	13.166	13.466	12.233	13.100	51.965
15	(Belgium) Maellyse Brassart	13.266	13.766	11.733	13.133	51.898
16	(Netherlands) Tisha Volleman	13.400	13.133	12.333	12.666	51.532
17	(South Korea) Lee Yun-seo	12.900	13.066	12.766	12.600	51.332
18	(Netherlands) Naomi Visser	13.000	12.033	11.866	13.766	50.665
19	(France) Carolann Héduit	13.433	13.266	11.933	11.900	50.532
20	(Romania) Ana Bărbosu	13.100	12.766	12.733	11.933	50.532
21	(France) Aline Friess	13.000	13.000	11.466	12.800	50.266
22	(Germany) Karina Schönmaier	13.066	12.133	11.666	12.566	49.431
23	(Australia) Romi Brown	13.166	13.466	11.200	11.433	49.265
24	(Spain) Laura Casabuena	13.200	12.300	7.500	13.333	46.333

- (Brazil) Flávia Saraiva withdrew and was replaced in the second rotation group by first reserve (Belgium) Maellyse Brassart.
- (France) Mélanie de Jesus dos Santos withdrew and was replaced in the third rotation group by teammate (France) Aline Friess, who had not qualified due to the two-per-country rule.
- (China) Tang Xijing withdrew and was replaced in the third rotation group by second reserve (Germany) Karina Schönmaier.

=== Vault ===
Rank	Gymnast	Vault 1				Vault 2				Total
Rank	Gymnast	D Score	E Score	Pen.	Score 1	D Score	E Score	Pen.	Score 2	Total
1st place, gold medalist(s)	(United States) Jade Carey	5.600	9.133		14.733	5.000	9.300		14.300	14.516
2nd place, silver medalist(s)	(United States) Jordan Chiles	5.000	9.500		14.500	4.800	9.400		14.200	14.350
3rd place, bronze medalist(s)	(France) Coline Devillard	5.400	9.100		14.500	5.000	8.933	-0.10	13.833	14.166
4	(Canada) Ellie Black	5.000	9.200		14.200	4.800	9.233		14.033	14.116
5	(Japan) Shoko Miyata	5.000	9.066		14.066	4.800	9.133		13.933	13.999
6	(Belgium) Lisa Vaelen	5.400	8.866		14.266	4.400	8.800		13.200	13.733
7	(South Korea) Yeo Seo-jeong	5.400	7.566	-0.30	12.666	5.000	9.033		14.033	13.349
8	(Israel) Lihie Raz	5.000	7.433	-0.30	12.133	4.400	8.666		13.066	12.599

- (United Kingdom) Jessica Gadirova withdrew and was replaced by first reserve (Israel) Lihie Raz.

=== Uneven bars ===
Rank	Gymnast	D Score	E Score	Pen.	Total
1st place, gold medalist(s)	(China) Wei Xiaoyuan	6.600	8.366		14.966
2nd place, silver medalist(s)	(United States) Shilese Jones	6.400	8.366		14.766
3rd place, bronze medalist(s)	(Belgium) Nina Derwael	6.300	8.400		14.700
4	(Germany) Elisabeth Seitz	6.100	8.266		14.366
5	(Netherlands) Sanna Veerman	6.200	7.966		14.166
6	(China) Luo Rui	6.100	7.700		13.800
7	(Netherlands) Naomi Visser	6.100	7.133		13.233
8	(Brazil) Rebeca Andrade	5.700	7.100		12.800

=== Balance beam ===
Rank	Gymnast	D Score	E Score	Pen.	Total
1st place, gold medalist(s)	(Japan) Hazuki Watanabe	5.500	8.100		13.600
2nd place, silver medalist(s)	(Canada) Ellie Black	5.500	8.066		13.566
3rd place, bronze medalist(s)	(Japan) Shoko Miyata	5.800	7.733		13.533
4	(France) Marine Boyer	5.500	7.800		13.300
5	(United States) Skye Blakely	6.200	7.100		13.300
6	(China) Ou Yushan	5.900	7.100		13.000
7	(Hungary) Zsófia Kovács	5.100	7.633		12.733
8	(Brazil) Rebeca Andrade	6.000	6.733		12.733

=== Floor ===
Rank	Gymnast	D Score	E Score	Pen.	Total
1st place, gold medalist(s)	(United Kingdom) Jessica Gadirova	6.000	8.200		14.200
2nd place, silver medalist(s)	(United States) Jordan Chiles	5.800	8.033		13.833
3rd place, bronze medalist(s)	(Brazil) Rebeca Andrade	5.900	7.833		13.733
3rd place, bronze medalist(s)	(United States) Jade Carey	5.900	7.833		13.733
5	(Netherlands) Naomi Visser	5.700	7.966		13.666
6	(Italy) Martina Maggio	5.600	7.933		13.533
7	(United Kingdom) Jennifer Gadirova	5.300	7.966	-0.10	13.166
8	(Japan) Shoko Miyata	5.300	7.766		13.066

- (Brazil) Flávia Saraiva withdrew and was replaced by first reserve (Japan) Shoko Miyata.
- (Italy) Alice D'Amato withdrew and was replaced by second reserve (Italy) Martina Maggio.

== Qualification ==
=== Men ===
==== Team ====
Rank	Team	Floor (gymnastics)	Pommel horse	Rings (gymnastics)	Vault (gymnastics)	Parallel bars	Horizontal bar	Total	Qual.
1	Japan	43.532 (1)	42.465 (1)	42.500 (1)	43.666 (3)	45.232 (1)	43.300 (1)	260.695	Q
1	Ryosuke Doi	14.766	14.466		14.566		13.800	260.695	Q
1	Daiki Hashimoto	14.466	11.666	14.000	14.700	14.733	15.100	260.695	Q
1	Yuya Kamoto			14.500		15.433	14.400	260.695	Q
1	Wataru Tanigawa	14.166	13.733	14.000	14.400	14.866	13.566	260.695	Q
1	Kakeru Tanigawa	14.300	14.266	13.233	14.266	14.933		260.695	Q
2	Great Britain	42.599 (2)	40.999 (3)	42.065 (3)	43.933 (1)	44.198 (2)	38.999 (12)	252.793	Q
2	Joe Fraser	13.900	12.533	13.933	14.266	15.066	14.266	252.793	Q
2	James Hall	14.166	14.033	13.466		12.766	11.633	252.793	Q
2	Jake Jarman	13.900	13.533	13.066	14.600	14.166	13.100	252.793	Q
2	Giarnni Regini-Moran	14.533	13.433		14.633	14.966	13.100	252.793	Q
2	Courtney Tulloch			14.666	14.700			252.793	Q
3	United States	40.765 (11)	41.966 (2)	41.933 (4)	43.366 (4)	43.432 (4)	40.833 (6)	252.295	Q
3	Asher Hong	13.866	13.300	13.900	14.433	14.600	13.200	252.295	Q
3	Brody Malone	12.766	13.433	13.700	14.333	13.966	14.433	252.295	Q
3	Stephen Nedoroscik		15.233					252.295	Q
3	Colt Walker	10.433		13.566	14.600	14.866	13.200	252.295	Q
3	Donnell Whittenburg	14.133	12.833	14.333	0.000	13.666	11.900	252.295	Q
4	China	40.000 (13)	40.599 (4)	41.332 (5)	41.466 (18)	43.300 (5)	42.232 (2)	249.929	Q
4	Sun Wei	12.200	12.966		13.400		14.833	249.929	Q
4	Yang Jiaxing	13.300	12.666		14.466		13.666	249.929	Q
4	You Hao		13.633	14.633		12.700	13.233	249.929	Q
4	Zhang Boheng	14.500	14.000	12.033	13.600	14.900	14.733	249.929	Q
4	Zou Jingyuan			14.666		15.700		249.929	Q
5	Italy	41.932 (4)	40.365 (6)	39.132 (16)	42.733 (7)	42.333 (8)	41.166 (5)	247.661	Q
5	Yumin Abbadini	13.666	13.966	13.000	13.600	13.700	13.600	247.661	Q
5	Nicola Bartolini	14.433	12.266	12.833	14.600	14.100		247.661	Q
5	Lorenzo Minh Casali	13.833	13.166	13.266	14.300	13.200	12.000	247.661	Q
5	Carlo Macchini		13.233				14.066	247.661	Q
5	Matteo Levantesi	13.233		12.866	13.833	14.533	13.500	247.661	Q
6	Spain	40.833 (9)	39.166 (10)	39.466 (15)	42.166 (11)	43.798 (3)	40.165 (8)	245.594	Q
6	Néstor Abad	13.400	12.766	12.566	13.500	14.300	13.166	245.594	Q
6	Thierno Diallo		13.500			14.366	12.400	245.594	Q
6	Nicolau Mir	12.700	10.200		14.066	14.766	13.166	245.594	Q
6	Joel Plata	13.500	12.900	13.300	14.600	14.666	13.833	245.594	Q
6	Rayderley Zapata	13.933		13.600	13.433			245.594	Q
7	Brazil	41.732 (5)	38.732 (13)	39.766 (12)	42.833 (5)	39.666 (21)	42.665 (3)	245.394	Q
7	Lucas Bitencourt		11.900	12.766		11.733	13.833	245.394	Q
7	Yuri Guimaraes	14.066		12.900	14.200			245.394	Q
7	Arthur Mariano	14.100	12.000		13.900	12.400	14.366	245.394	Q
7	Diogo Soares	13.466	13.566	13.066	14.100	14.100	13.966	245.394	Q
7	Caio Souza	13.566	13.166	13.800	14.533	13.166	14.333	245.394	Q
8	South Korea	42.132 (3)	38.666 (14)	38.899 (18)	43.833 (2)	40.798 (17)	39.765 (10)	244.093	Q
8	Kim Jae-ho	13.400	11.900	11.766	14.533	13.766	13.266	244.093	Q
8	Kim Han-sol	14.266			14.700			244.093	Q
8	Lee Jun-ho	12.733	12.633	13.433	14.600	13.266	12.233	244.093	Q
8	Lee Jung-hyo		13.000	12.100		12.566	12.866	244.093	Q
8	Ryu Sung-hyun	14.466	13.033	13.366	13.666	13.766	13.633	244.093	Q
9	Germany	39.665 (15)	39.832 (8)	40.298 (7)	41.932 (13)	43.199 (6)	38.366 (17)	243.292	R1
9	Lukas Dauser	13.666	12.233	13.133	13.866	15.400	12.133	243.292	R1
9	Nils Dunkel	13.166	14.166	13.466		14.133		243.292	R1
9	Pascal Brendel	12.700			13.633	13.666	11.733	243.292	R1
9	Andreas Toba		13.433	13.666	14.300		13.133	243.292	R1
9	Glenn Trebing	12.833	12.166	13.166	13.766	13.200	13.100	243.292	R1
10	Canada	39.633 (16)	38.533 (16)	39.599 (14)	42.833 (5)	42.132 (9)	40.232 (7)	242.962	R2
10	Zachary Clay		14.200	12.800		13.866	10.733	242.962	R2
10	Félix Dolci	12.433	10.366	13.366	14.533	13.866	13.766	242.962	R2
10	William Emard	14.100	11.933		14.400			242.962	R2
10	Chris Kaji	13.100		13.433	13.900	12.733	12.833	242.962	R2
10	Samuel Zakutney		12.400	12.766		14.400	13.633	242.962	R2
11	Turkey	41.533 (7)	37.633 (19)	42.066 (2)	41.832 (14)	41.199 (13)	38.565 (14)	242.828	R3
11	Ferhat Arıcan		13.100		14.033	15.200	12.933	242.828	R3
11	Adem Asil	14.133	12.933	14.666	13.933	12.533	13.566	242.828	R3
11	Yunus Gündoğdu	11.866		13.600		13.466		242.828	R3
11	Mehmet Koşak	13.600	11.700	13.800	12.966	11.933	11.866	242.828	R3
11	Ahmet Önder	13.800	9.966		13.866		12.066	242.828	R3
12	Hungary	41.565 (6)	38.865 (12)	39.600 (13)	39.799 (23)	42.999 (7)	39.833 (9)	242.661	R4
12	Krisztián Balázs	13.166	12.300	12.800	13.166	14.533	14.100	242.661	R4
12	Botond Kardos	13.866			13.800	13.966	13.200	242.661	R4
12	Balázs Kiss		13.366	13.300				242.661	R4
12	Krisztofer Mészáros	14.233	12.466	13.100	12.833	14.500	12.366	242.661	R4
12	Benedek Tomcsányi	13.466	13.033	13.200	12.800	13.266	12.533	242.661	R4

==== Individual all-around ====
Rank	Gymnast	Floor (gymnastics)	Pommel horse	Rings (gymnastics)	Vault (gymnastics)	Parallel bars	Horizontal bar	Total	Qual.
1	(Japan) Wataru Tanigawa	14.166	13.733	14.000	14.400	14.866	13.566	84.731	Q
2	(Japan) Daiki Hashimoto	14.466	11.666	14.000	14.700	14.733	15.100	84.665	Q
3	(Philippines) Carlos Yulo	15.266	11.766	14.066	14.733	15.300	13.533	84.664	Q
4	(United Kingdom) Joe Fraser	13.900	12.533	13.933	14.266	15.066	14.266	83.964	Q
5	(China) Zhang Boheng	14.500	14.000	12.033	13.600	14.900	14.733	83.766	Q
6	(United States) Asher Hong	13.866	13.300	13.900	14.433	14.600	13.200	83.299	Q
7	(Spain) Joel Plata	13.500	12.900	13.300	14.600	14.666	13.833	82.799	Q
8	(United States) Brody Malone	12.766	13.433	13.700	14.333	13.966	14.433	82.631	Q
9	(Netherlands) Casimir Schmidt	13.800	13.500	13.933	14.333	13.966	13.033	82.565	Q
10	(Brazil) Caio Souza	13.566	13.166	13.800	14.533	13.166	14.333	82.564	Q
11	(United Kingdom) Jake Jarman	13.900	13.533	13.066	14.600	14.166	13.100	82.365	Q
12	(Brazil) Diogo Soares	13.466	13.566	13.066	14.100	14.100	13.966	82.264	Q
13	(South Korea) Ryu Sung-hyun	14.466	13.033	13.366	13.666	13.766	13.633	81.930	Q
14	(Turkey) Adem Asil	14.133	12.933	14.666	13.933	12.566	13.566	81.764	Q
15	(Ukraine) Illia Kovtun	12.700	13.733	12.400	14.400	14.966	13.533	81.732	Q
16	(Italy) Yumin Abbadini	13.666	13.966	13.000	13.600	13.700	13.600	81.532	Q
17	(Chinese Taipei) Tang Chia-hung	14.166	13.000	13.366	13.900	13.533	12.733	80.698	Q
18	(Germany) Lukas Dauser	13.666	12.233	13.133	13.866	15.400	12.133	80.431	Q
19	(Norway) Sofus Heggemsnes	13.500	12.400	13.233	14.433	13.433	13.100	80.099	Q
20	(Hungary) Krisztián Balázs	13.166	12.300	12.800	13.166	14.566	14.100	80.065	Q
21	(Colombia) Jossimar Calvo	12.933	13.300	12.066	13.033	15.166	13.400	79.898	Q
22	(Belgium) Luka van den Keybus	13.700	11.733	12.800	14.500	14.333	12.733	79.799	Q
23	(Romania) Gabriel Burtănete	13.266	12.466	13.200	14.800	13.500	12.566	79.798	Q
24	(Italy) Lorenzo Minh Casali	13.833	13.166	13.266	14.300	13.200	12.000	79.765	Q
25	(Spain) Néstor Abad	13.400	12.766	12.566	13.500	14.300	13.166	79.698	R1
26	(Egypt) Omar Mohamed	13.733	12.866	13.600	13.766	13.866	11.700	79.531	R2
27	(Egypt) Mohamed Afify	13.100	13.300	12.966	13.666	13.866	12.633	79.531	R3

==== Floor exercise ====
Rank	Gymnast	D Score	E Score	Pen.	Total	Qual.
1	(Philippines) Carlos Yulo	6.400	8.866		15.266	Q
2	(Japan) Ryosuke Doi	6.200	8.566		14.766	Q
3	(Kazakhstan) Milad Karimi	6.300	8.433		14.733	Q
4	(United Kingdom) Giarnni Regini-Moran	6.200	8.333		14.533	Q
5	(China) Zhang Boheng	6.100	8.400		14.500	Q
6	(South Korea) Ryu Sung-hyun	5.900	8.566		14.466	Q
7	(Japan) Daiki Hashimoto	6.000	8.466		14.466	Q
8	(Italy) Nicola Bartolini	5.900	8.533		14.433	Q
9	(Japan) Kakeru Tanigawa	5.800	8.500		14.300	–
10	(France) Benjamin Osberger	5.600	8.666		14.266	R1
11	(Croatia) Aurel Benović	6.100	8.366	–0.2	14.266	R2
12	(South Korea) Kim Han-sol	6.000	8.266		14.266	R3

==== Pommel horse ====
Rank	Gymnast	D Score	E Score	Pen.	Total	Qual.
1	(Republic of Ireland) Rhys McClenaghan	6.300	8.933		15.233	Q
2	(United States) Stephen Nedoroscik	6.400	8.833		15.233	Q
3	(Kazakhstan) Nariman Kurbanov	6.300	8.733		15.033	Q
4	(Netherlands) Loran de Munck	6.400	8.433		14.833	Q
5	(Armenia) Harutyun Merdinyan	6.100	8.600		14.700	Q
6	(Japan) Ryosuke Doi	6.100	8.366		14.466	Q
7	(Croatia) Filip Ude	5.800	8.600		14.400	Q
8	(Jordan) Ahmad Abu Al-Soud	6.300	8.066		14.366	Q
9	(Uzbekistan) Abdulla Azimov	6.100	8.200		14.300	R1
10	(Japan) Kakeru Tanigawa	6.300	7.966		14.266	R2
11	(Canada) Zachary Clay	5.700	8.500		14.200	R3

==== Rings ====
Rank	Gymnast	D Score	E Score	Pen.	Total	Qual.
1	(United Kingdom) Courtney Tulloch	6.100	8.566		14.666	Q
2	(China) Zou Jingyuan	6.300	8.366		14.666	Q
2	(Turkey) Adem Asil	6.300	8.366		14.666	Q
4	(China) You Hao	6.500	8.133		14.633	Q
5	(Armenia) Vahagn Davtyan	6.000	8.566		14.566	Q
6	(Japan) Yuya Kamoto	6.400	8.100		14.500	Q
7	(Armenia) Artur Avetisyan	5.900	8.566		14.466	Q
8	(United States) Donnell Whittenburg	6.000	8.333		14.333	Q
9	(Cyprus) Sokratis Pilakouris	5.900	8.233		14.133	R1
10	(Philippines) Carlos Yulo	6.000	8.066		14.066	R2
11	(Japan) Daiki Hashimoto	5.800	8.200		14.000	R3

==== Vault ====
Rank	Gymnast	Vault 1				Vault 2				Total	Qual.
Rank	Gymnast	D Score	E Score	Pen.	Score 1	D Score	E Score	Pen.	Score 2	Total	Qual.
1	(Armenia) Artur Davtyan	5.600	9.400	-0.10	14.900	5.600	9.400	-0.10	14.900	14.900	Q
2	(Philippines) Carlos Yulo	6.000	8.833	-0.10	14.733	5.600	9.366		14.966	14.849	Q
3	(Romania) Gabriel Burtănete	5.600	9.200		14.800	5.600	8.866		14.466	14.633	Q
4	(Ukraine) Igor Radivilov	5.600	9.100		14.700	5.600	8.833		14.433	14.566	Q
5	(Brazil) Caio Souza	5.600	8.933		14.533	5.600	9.000		14.600	14.566	Q
6	(South Korea) Lee Jun-ho	5.600	9.000		14.600	5.200	9.100		14.300	14.450	Q
7	(Japan) Wataru Tanigawa	5.600	8.800		14.400	5.600	8.900		14.500	14.450	Q
8	(South Korea) Kim Han-sol	5.600	9.100		14.700	5.200	8.966		14.166	14.433	Q
9	(Turkey) Adem Asil	5.600	8.333		13.933	5.600	9.133		14.733	14.333	R1
10	(Brazil) Yuri Guimaraes	5.200	9.000		14.200	5.200	9.033		14.233	14.216	R2
11	(United Kingdom) Courtney Tulloch	5.600	9.100		14.700	6.000	7.800	-0.10	13.700	14.200	R3

==== Parallel bars ====
Rank	Gymnast	D Score	E Score	Pen.	Total	Qual.
1	(China) Zou Jingyuan	6.500	9.200		15.700	Q
2	(Japan) Yuya Kamoto	6.500	8.933		15.433	Q
3	(Germany) Lukas Dauser	6.600	8.800		15.400	Q
4	(Philippines) Carlos Yulo	6.300	9.000		15.300	Q
5	(Turkey) Ferhat Arıcan	6.600	8.600		15.200	Q
6	(Colombia) Jossimar Calvo	6.700	8.466		15.166	Q
7	(United Kingdom) Joe Fraser	6.500	8.566		15.166	Q
8	(United Kingdom) Giarnni Regini-Moran	6.400	8.566		14.966	Q
9	(Ukraine) Illia Kovtun	6.600	8.366		14.966	R1
10	(Japan) Kakeru Tanigawa	6.300	8.633		14.933	R2
11	(China) Zhang Boheng	6.400	8.500		14.900	R3

==== Horizontal bar ====
Rank	Gymnast	D Score	E Score	Pen.	Total	Qual.
1	(Japan) Daiki Hashimoto	6.700	8.400		15.100	Q
2	(China) Sun Wei	6.400	8.433		14.833	Q
3	(China) Zhang Boheng	6.200	8.533		14.733	Q
4	(Cyprus) Ilias Georgiou	5.900	8.566		14.466	Q
5	(United States) Brody Malone	6.300	8.133		14.433	Q
6	(Japan) Yuya Kamoto	6.000	8.400		14.400	Q
7	(Brazil) Arthur Mariano	5.900	8.466		14.366	Q
8	(Australia) Tyson Bull	5.900	8.433		14.333	Q
9	(Australia) Mitchell Morgans	6.200	8.133		14.333	R1
10	(Brazil) Caio Souza	6.300	8.033		14.333	R2
11	(Lithuania) Robert Tvorogal	5.700	8.600		14.300	R3

=== Women ===
==== Team ====
Rank	Team	Vault (gymnastics)	Uneven bars	Balance beam	Floor (gymnastics)	Total	Qual.
1	United States	43.266 (1)	41.965 (4)	40.066 (2)	41.966 (1)	167.263	Q
1	Skye Blakely		12.566	13.733	13.600	167.263	Q
1	Jade Carey	14.600	13.333	13.133	14.066	167.263	Q
1	Jordan Chiles	14.466	14.066	11.366	14.100	167.263	Q
1	Shilese Jones	14.200	14.566	13.200	13.800	167.263	Q
1	Leanne Wong	13.766				167.263	Q
2	Great Britain	43.132 (2)	41.465 (5)	38.965 (4)	41.033 (3)	164.595	Q
2	Ondine Achampong	14.466	12.833	12.966	13.333	164.595	Q
2	Georgia-Mae Fenton	13.900	14.133	12.100		164.595	Q
2	Jennifer Gadirova				13.600	164.595	Q
2	Jessica Gadirova	14.400	13.166	12.933	14.100	164.595	Q
2	Alice Kinsella	14.266	14.166	13.066	12.300	164.595	Q
3	Brazil	41.832 (5)	41.099 (6)	38.766 (5)	41.866 (2)	163.563	Q
3	Rebeca Andrade	15.066	14.666	13.400	14.200	163.563	Q
3	Lorrane Oliveira	12.666	13.233			163.563	Q
3	Carolyne Pedro	12.933	12.800	11.400	12.833	163.563	Q
3	Flávia Saraiva	13.833	13.200	12.900	14.200	163.563	Q
3	Júlia Soares			12.466	13.466	163.563	Q
4	Italy	42.133 (3)	42.766 (2)	37.333 (9)	40.566 (4)	162.798	Q
4	Alice D'Amato	14.233	14.400	12.133	13.600	162.798	Q
4	Manila Esposito	13.566	13.966	10.800	13.466	162.798	Q
4	Martina Maggio	14.200	14.200	12.900	13.500	162.798	Q
4	Veronica Mandriota	13.700			12.933	162.798	Q
4	Giorgia Villa		14.166	12.300		162.798	Q
5	Japan	41.633 (6)	40.399 (10)	40.766 (1)	39.766 (6)	162.564	Q
5	Kokoro Fukasawa	13.333	13.500			162.564	Q
5	Shoko Miyata	14.300	12.566	13.700	13.600	162.564	Q
5	Ayaka Sakaguchi	14.000		13.466	13.066	162.564	Q
5	Hazuki Watanabe		13.233	13.600	12.533	162.564	Q
5	Chiharu Yamada	13.233	13.666	12.466	13.100	162.564	Q
6	China	39.833 (12)	43.833 (1)	39.199 (3)	39.199 (9)	162.064	Q
6	Luo Rui		14.900	10.766		162.064	Q
6	Ou Yushan	13.000	14.166	13.900	13.400	162.064	Q
6	Tang Xijing	13.000	14.333	12.466	13.066	162.064	Q
6	Wei Xiaoyuan	12.900	14.600		12.733	162.064	Q
6	Zhang Jin	13.833		12.833	12.366	162.064	Q
7	France	42.132 (4)	41.099 (6)	38.465 (7)	39.732 (7)	161.428	Q
7	Marine Boyer		12.800	13.666	13.300	161.428	Q
7	Mélanie de Jesus dos Santos	13.666	14.400	12.533	13.266	161.428	Q
7	Coline Devillard	14.433				161.428	Q
7	Aline Friess	13.666	13.233	12.266	13.100	161.428	Q
7	Carolann Héduit	14.033	13.466	12.033	13.166	161.428	Q
8	Canada	41.199 (7)	39.965 (12)	38.665 (6)	39.832 (5)	159.661	Q
8	Ellie Black	13.666	13.933	13.266	13.266	159.661	Q
8	Laurie Denommée	13.400	12.866		13.266	159.661	Q
8	Denelle Pedrick	13.900		11.700	12.900	159.661	Q
8	Emma Spence	13.633	12.800	12.533		159.661	Q
8	Sydney Turner		13.166	12.866	13.300	159.661	Q
9	Netherlands	40.366 (8)	42.766 (2)	36.932 (12)	39.332 (8)	159.396	R1
9	Eythora Thorsdottir	13.800	13.833	11.666	12.466	159.396	R1
9	Eve de Ruiter	13.000		11.233	11.900	159.396	R1
9	Sanna Veerman		14.533			159.396	R1
9	Naomi Visser	13.366	14.400	12.733	13.666	159.396	R1
9	Tisha Volleman	13.200	13.400	12.533	13.200	159.396	R1
10	Australia	40.099 (10)	41.032 (8)	37.232 (10)	37.732 (16)	156.095	R2
10	Georgia-Rose Brown	13.000	13.400		11.133	156.095	R2
10	Romi Brown	13.166	13.566	12.266	12.733	156.095	R2
10	Georgia Godwin	13.600	13.333	13.000	12.933	156.095	R2
10	Kate McDonald		14.066	10.733		156.095	R2
10	Breanna Scott	13.333		11.966	12.066	156.095	R2
11	Belgium	40.099 (10)	40.232 (11)	37.099 (11)	38.633 (11)	156.063	R3
11	Maellyse Brassart	13.300	12.666	11.833	12.900	156.063	R3
11	Nina Derwael		14.700	12.566		156.063	R3
11	Ylea Tollet	12.833			12.266	156.063	R3
11	Lisa Vaelen	13.966	12.566	12.700	13.200	156.063	R3
11	Jutta Verkest	12.833	12.866	11.333	12.533	156.063	R3
12	Germany	40.166 (9)	40.433 (9)	36.799 (13)	38.266 (14)	155.664	R4
12	Anna-Lena König	13.000	12.066	11.933	13.000	155.664	R4
12	Emma Malewski		13.333	12.933	12.666	155.664	R4
12	Lea Quaas	13.300		11.600	12.233	155.664	R4
12	Karina Schönmaier	13.400	12.700	11.933	12.600	155.664	R4
12	Elisabeth Seitz	13.466	14.400			155.664	R4

==== Individual all-around ====
Rank	Gymnast	Vault (gymnastics)	Uneven bars	Balance beam	Floor (gymnastics)	Total	Qual.
1	(Brazil) Rebeca Andrade	15.066	14.666	13.400	14.200	57.332	Q
2	(United States) Shilese Jones	14.200	14.566	13.200	13.800	55.766	Q
3	(United States) Jade Carey	14.600	13.333	13.133	14.066	55.132	Q
4	(Italy) Martina Maggio	14.200	14.200	12.900	13.500	54.800	Q
5	(United Kingdom) Jessica Gadirova	14.400	13.166	12.933	14.100	54.599	Q
6	(China) Ou Yushan	13.000	14.166	13.900	13.400	54.466	Q
7	(Italy) Alice D'Amato	14.233	14.400	12.133	13.600	54.366	Q
8	(Japan) Shoko Miyata	14.300	12.566	13.700	13.600	54.166	Q
9	(Netherlands) Naomi Visser	13.366	14.400	12.733	13.666	54.165	Q
10	(Brazil) Flávia Saraiva	13.833	13.200	12.900	14.200	54.133	Q
11	(Canada) Ellie Black	13.666	13.933	13.266	13.266	54.131	Q
12	(United States) Jordan Chiles	14.466	14.066	11.516	14.100	53.998	–
13	(France) Mélanie de Jesus dos Santos	13.666	14.400	12.533	13.266	53.865	Q
14	(United Kingdom) Alice Kinsella	14.266	14.166	13.066	12.300	53.798	Q
15	(United Kingdom) Ondine Achampong	14.466	12.833	12.966	13.333	53.598	–
16	(Australia) Georgia Godwin	13.600	13.333	13.000	12.933	52.866	Q
17	(China) Tang Xijing	13.000	14.333	12.466	13.066	52.865	Q
18	(France) Carolann Héduit	14.033	13.466	12.033	13.166	52.698	Q
19	(Japan) Chiharu Yamada	13.233	13.666	12.466	13.100	52.465	Q
20	(Belgium) Lisa Vaelen	13.966	12.566	12.700	13.200	52.432	Q
21	(Netherlands) Tisha Volleman	13.200	13.400	12.533	13.200	52.333	Q
22	(France) Aline Friess	13.666	13.233	12.266	13.100	52.265	–
23	(Romania) Ana Bărbosu	13.000	13.433	12.500	13.300	52.233	Q
24	(Spain) Laura Casabuena	13.200	12.666	12.966	13.200	52.032	Q
25	(South Korea) Lee Yun-seo	12.800	13.200	12.733	13.100	51.833	Q
26	(Italy) Manila Esposito	13.566	13.966	10.800	13.466	51.798	–
27	(Netherlands) Eythora Thorsdottir	13.800	13.833	11.666	12.466	51.765	–
28	(Australia) Romi Brown	13.166	13.566	12.266	12.733	51.731	Q
29	(Finland) Maisa Kuusikko	13.233	12.866	12.066	13.066	51.231	Q
30	(Belgium) Maellyse Brassart	13.300	12.666	11.833	12.900	50.699	R1
31	(Germany) Karina Schönmaier	13.400	12.700	11.933	12.600	50.633	R2
32	(Mexico) Natalia Escalera	12.966	12.966	11.600	12.833	50.365	R3

==== Vault ====
Rank	Gymnast	Vault 1				Vault 2				Total	Qual.
Rank	Gymnast	D Score	E Score	Pen.	Score 1	D Score	E Score	Pen.	Score 2	Total	Qual.
1	(United States) Jade Carey	5.600	9.000		14.600	5.000	9.366		14.366	14.483	Q
2	(United States) Jordan Chiles	5.000	9.466		14.466	4.800	9.366		14.166	14.316	Q
3	(France) Coline Devillard	5.400	9.033		14.433	5.000	9.166		14.166	14.299	Q
4	(South Korea) Yeo Seo-jeong	5.400	8.966		14.366	5.000	9.133		14.133	14.259	Q
5	(United Kingdom) Jessica Gadirova	5.000	9.400		14.400	4.800	9.200		14.000	14.200	Q
6	(Canada) Ellie Black	4.800	8.866		13.666	5.000	8.833		13.833	13.749	Q
7	(Japan) Shoko Miyata	5.000	9.300		14.300	4.800	8.233		13.033	13.666	Q
8	(Belgium) Lisa Vaelen	5.400	8.666	-0.10	13.966	4.400	8.633		13.033	13.499	Q
9	(United States) Leanne Wong	5.000	8.766		13.766	4.200	8.900		13.100	13.433	–
10	(Israel) Lihie Raz	5.000	8.700		13.800	4.400	8.733		13.133	13.416	R1
11	(France) Aline Friess	5.400	8.366	-0.10	13.666	4.400	4.400	-0.30	12.900	13.283	R2
12	(Brazil) Rebeca Andrade	5.600	9.466		15.066	3.000	8.466		11.466	13.266	R3

==== Uneven bars ====
Mélanie de Jesus dos Santos and Alice D'Amato both served as the first reserve (R1) for receiving identical D and E scores.

Rank	Gymnast	D Score	E Score	Pen.	Total	Qual.
1	(China) Luo Rui	6.400	8.500		14.900	Q
2	(Belgium) Nina Derwael	6.300	8.400		14.700	Q
3	(Brazil) Rebeca Andrade	6.100	8.566		14.666	Q
4	(China) Wei Xiaoyuan	6.400	8.200		14.600	Q
5	(United States) Shilese Jones	6.300	8.266		14.566	Q
6	(Netherlands) Sanna Veerman	6.300	8.233		14.533	Q
7	(Netherlands) Naomi Visser	6.000	8.400		14.400	Q
8	(Germany) Elisabeth Seitz	6.100	8.300		14.400	Q
9	(France) Mélanie de Jesus dos Santos	6.300	8.100		14.400	R1
9	(Italy) Alice D'Amato	6.300	8.100		14.400	R1
11	(China) Tang Xijing	6.100	8.233		14.333	–
12	(Italy) Martina Maggio	5.900	8.300		14.200	R3

==== Balance beam ====
Rank	Gymnast	D Score	E Score	Pen.	Total	Qual.
1	(China) Ou Yushan	6.200	7.700		13.900	Q
2	(United States) Skye Blakely	6.000	7.733		13.733	Q
3	(Japan) Shoko Miyata	5.800	7.900		13.700	Q
4	(France) Marine Boyer	5.700	7.966		13.666	Q
5	(Japan) Hazuki Watanabe	5.400	8.200		13.600	Q
6	(Hungary) Zsófia Kovács	5.700	7.833		13.533	Q
7	(Japan) Ayaka Sakaguchi	5.600	7.866		13.466	–
8	(Brazil) Rebeca Andrade	5.800	7.600		13.400	Q
9	(Canada) Ellie Black	5.500	7.766		13.266	Q
10	(United States) Shilese Jones	5.200	8.000		13.200	R1
11	(United States) Jade Carey	5.400	7.733		13.133	–
12	(United Kingdom) Alice Kinsella	5.800	7.366	–0.1	13.066	R2
13	(Chinese Taipei) Ting Hua-tien	5.400	7.600		13.000	R3

==== Floor exercise ====
Rank	Gymnast	D Score	E Score	Pen.	Total	Qual.
1	(Brazil) Flávia Saraiva	5.800	8.400		14.200	Q
2	(Brazil) Rebeca Andrade	6.100	8.100		14.200	Q
3	(United Kingdom) Jessica Gadirova	5.900	8.300	–0.1	14.100	Q
4	(United States) Jordan Chiles	5.800	8.300		14.100	Q
5	(United States) Jade Carey	6.100	7.966		14.066	Q
6	(United States) Shilese Jones	5.700	8.100		13.800	–
7	(Netherlands) Naomi Visser	5.600	8.066		13.666	Q
8	(United Kingdom) Jennifer Gadirova	5.300	8.300		13.600	Q
9	(Italy) Alice D'Amato	5.400	8.200		13.600	Q
10	(Japan) Shoko Miyata	5.500	8.100		13.600	R1
11	(United States) Skye Blakely	5.700	7.900		13.600	–
12	(Italy) Martina Maggio	5.700	8.100	–0.3	13.500	R2
13	(Brazil) Júlia Soares	5.500	8.066	–0.1	13.466	–
14	(Italy) Manila Esposito	5.400	8.066		13.466	–
15	(China) Ou Yushan	5.400	8.000		13.400	R3

== Olympic qualification ==
The following teams qualified a full team of five gymnasts to the 2024 Summer Olympics:

Men

- China
- Japan
- (United Kingdom) Great Britain

Women

- United States
- (United Kingdom) Great Britain
- Canada

== Participating nations ==
- Albania
- Algeria
- Argentina
- Armenia
- Australia
- Austria
- Azerbaijan
- Barbados
- Belgium
- Brazil
- Bulgaria
- Canada
- Chile
- China
- Chinese Taipei
- Colombia
- Costa Rica
- Croatia
- Cyprus
- Czech Republic
- Denmark
- Dominican Republic
- Ecuador
- Egypt
- Finland
- France
- Germany
- Great Britain
- Greece
- Hong Kong
- Hungary
- Iceland
- India
- Indonesia
- Ireland
- Israel
- Italy
- Japan
- Jordan
- Kazakhstan
- Latvia
- Lithuania
- Luxembourg
- Malta
- Mexico
- Morocco
- Netherlands
- New Zealand
- Norway
- Panama
- Peru
- Philippines
- Portugal
- Puerto Rico
- Romania
- Serbia
- Singapore
- Slovenia
- South Africa
- South Korea
- Spain
- Sweden
- Switzerland
- Thailand
- Trinidad and Tobago
- Turkey
- Ukraine
- United States
- Uzbekistan
- Venezuela

== Legacy ==
In July 2023, the Liverpool Echo reported that the event brought £5 million into the local economy of the Liverpool City Region.
