= Wu Ran =

Chinese artistic gymnast

Wu Ran 吴然
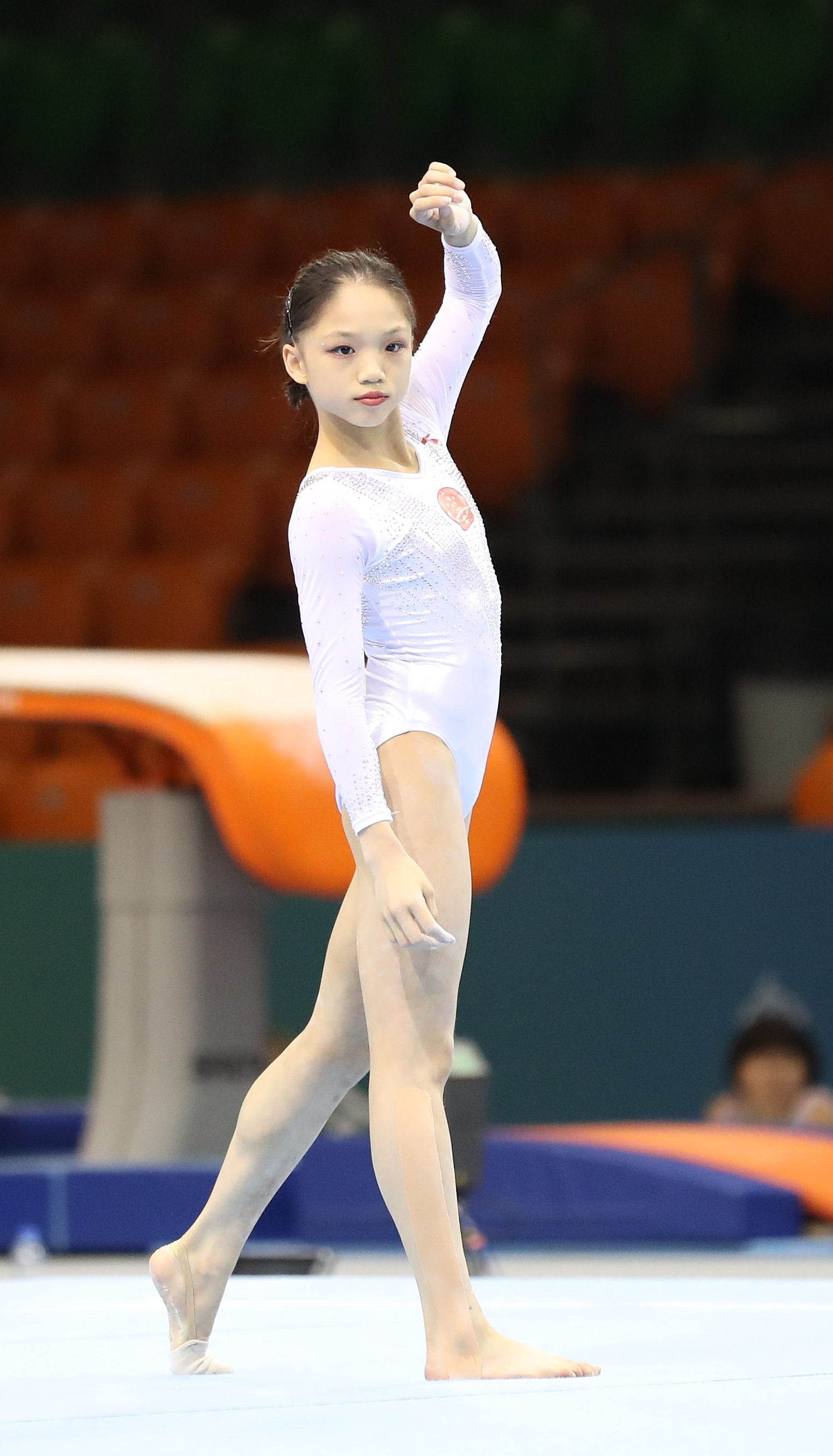
- Wu at the 2019 Junior World Championships

Personal information
- Born: April 2, 2005 (age 21) Guangxi, China

Gymnastics career
- Discipline: Women's artistic gymnastics
- Country represented: China; (2019–present)
- Club: Guangdong Province
Medal record
Women's artistic gymnastics
Representing China
Asian Championships
Gold medal – first place	2022 Doha	Team
Gold medal – first place	2022 Doha	Balance beam
Gold medal – first place	2022 Doha	Floor exercise
Junior World Championships
Silver medal – second place	2019 Györ	Team
National Games
Gold medal – first place	2021 Shaanxi	Team

Wu Ran (simplified Chinese: 吴然; traditional Chinese: 吳然, born April 4, 2005, in Guangxi, China) is a Chinese artistic gymnast. She is the 2022 Asian champion in the team, balance beam, and floor exercise. She was the alternate for the Chinese team at the inaugural Junior World Championships.

== Junior career ==
=== 2019 ===
Wu was selected as an alternate for China at the inaugural Junior World Championships. The team won the silver medal behind Russia. She next competed at the Chinese National Youth Games where she placed fifth on both balance beam and floor exercise.

== Senior career ==
=== 2022 ===
At the Asian Championships Wu helped team China win gold. Individually she also won gold on balance beam and floor exercise.

== Competitive history ==
Year	Event	Team	AA	VT	UB	BB	FX
Junior
2018	National Championships (14 & under)		6		5	2nd place, silver medalist(s)	
2019
2019	Junior World Championships	(silver) (Note: Wu was the team CHN alternate)					
2019	Chinese National Youth Games	1st place, gold medalist(s)	12			5	5
2020	National Championships	1st place, gold medalist(s)				5	2nd place, silver medalist(s)
Senior
2021	National Championships	1st place, gold medalist(s)				4	
2021	Chinese National Games	1st place, gold medalist(s)					5
2022
2022	Asian Championships	1st place, gold medalist(s)				1st place, gold medalist(s)	1st place, gold medalist(s)
2023	Chinese Championships	1st place, gold medalist(s)	21		6		
2023	World Championships	4					
2024	DTB Pokal Team Challenge	1st place, gold medalist(s)					
2024	DTB Pokal Mixed Cup	2nd place, silver medalist(s)					
