= List of Olympic female artistic gymnasts for Japan =

Gymnastics events have been staged at the Olympic Games since 1896, with women competing for the time at the 1928 Olympic Games. Japanese female artistic gymnasts first competed at the 1956 Olympic Games.

== Gymnasts ==
Gymnast	Years	Ref.
Ginko Abukawa-Chiba	1960, 1964	
Urara Ashikawa	2020	
Kazue Hanyu	1968, 1972	
Takako Hasegawa	1972	
Miho Hashiguchi	1996	
Kayoko Hashiguchi-Saka	1968, 1972	
Hitomi Hatakeda	2020	
Yuna Hiraiwa	2020	
Eiko Hirashima	1972	
Naho Hoshiyama	1996	
Mitsuka Ikeda	1956	
Manami Ishizaka	2004	
Mitsuko Kandori	1968	
Tokie Kawase	1984	
Chieko Kikkawa	1976	
Rina Kishi	2024	
Mari Kosuge	1992	
Kyoko Kubota	1956	
Mayu Kuroda	2008	
Kyoko Mano	1976	
Miyuki Matsuhisa-Hironaka	1968, 1972, 1976	
Yu Minobe	2008, 2012	
Hanako Miura	1992, 1996	
Sae Miyakawa	2016	
Toshiko Miyamoto	1972	
Noriko Mochizuki	1984	
Mieko Mori	1988	
Sachiko Morimura	1988	
Maiko Morio	1984, 1988	
Mai Murakami	2016, 2020	
Haruka Nakamura	2024	
Taniko Nakamura-Mitsukuri	1964, 1968	
Yuriko Nanahara	1988	
Sakiko Nozawa	1976	
Satsuko Obata	1996	
Chieko Oda	1968	
Mana Okamura	2024	
Masumi Okawa	1996	
Satoko Okazaki	1976	
Kiyoko Ono	1960, 1964	
Kyoko Oshima	2004, 2008	
Chihiro Oyagi	1984	
Shizuko Sakashita	1956	
Makiko Sanada	1988	
Suzuko Seki	1956	
Aya Sekine	1996	
Kyoko Seo	1992	
Miho Shinoda	1988	
Yuko Shintake	2008, 2012	
Toshiko Shirasu-Aihara	1960, 1964	
Kazuko Sogabe	1956, 1960	
Risa Sugawara	1996	
Aiko Sugihara	2016, 2020	
Miho Takenaka	2000	
Rie Tanaka	2012	
Keiko Tanaka-Ikeda	1956, 1960, 1964	
Asuka Teramoto	2012, 2016	
Hiroko Tsuji	1964	
Kimiko Tsukada	1960	
Koko Tsurumi	2008, 2012	
Yuki Uchiyama	2016	
Miki Uemura	2008	
Kohane Ushioku	2024	
Sae Watanabe	1984	
Kana Yamawaki	2000	
Nobue Yamazaki	1976	
Ayami Yukimori	1984	

== Medalists ==
Medal	Name	Year	Event
Bronze	Aihara, Chiba, Ikeda, Nakamura, Ono, Tsuji	(Japan) 1964 Tokyo	Women's team
Bronze	Mai Murakami	(Japan) 2020 Tokyo	Women's floor exercise

== See also ==
- Japan women's national gymnastics team
