= NHK Trophy Artistic Gymnastics Championship =

Japanese gymnastics competition

The NHK Trophy Artistic Gymnastics Championship (Japanese: NHK杯体操選手権) is one of the Japanese gymnastics competitions. The first convention was held in 1962. It often doubles as a preliminary competition to determine the Japanese national team for the Olympics and World Gymnastics Championship.

== Results of the tournament ==
No.	Year	Venue	Men’s Champion	Women’s Champion
1	1962	Tokyo	Takashi Ono	Toshiko Shirasu
2	1963	Tokyo	Yukio Endo	Hiroko Tsuji
3	1964	Tokyo	Yukio Endo	Keiko Ikeda
4	1965	Komazawa	Yukio Endo	Taki Shibuya
5	1966	Tokyo	Yukio Endo	Taki Shibuya
6	1967	Tokyo	Akinori Nakayama	Taki Shibuya
7	1968	Tokyo	Sawao Kato	Taniko Nakamura
8	1969	Tokyo	Akinori Nakayama	Chieko Oda
9	1970	Tokyo	Akinori Nakayama	Chieko Oda
10	1971	Yokohama	Sawao Kato	Miyuki Matsuhisa
11	1972	Komazawa	Sawao Kato	Eiko Hirashima
12	1973	Yokohama	Shigeru Kasamatsu	Eiko Hirashima
13	1974	Aichi	Wolfgang Thüne	Angelika Hellmann
14	1975	Hachioji	Shigeru Kasamatsu	Miyuki Hironaka
15	1976	Nihon University	Shigeru Kasamatsu	Satoko Okazaki
16	1977	Hamada	Shigeru Kasamatsu	Satoko Okazaki
17	1978	Tokyo	Hiroshi Kajiyama	Sakiko Nozawa
18	1979	Tokyo	Koji Gushiken	Yayoi Kano
19	1980	Fukui Prefecture	Kyoji Yamawaki	Yayoi Kano
20	1981	Tokyo	Koji Gushiken	Yayoi Kano
21	1982	Hachiōji	Koji Gushiken	Yayoi Kano
22	1983	Okayama	Koji Gushiken	Maiko Morio
23	1984	Yonago	Koji Gushiken	Maiko Morio
24	1985	Sendai	Koji Sotomura	Miho Shinoda
25	1986	Yokkaichi	Kyoji Yamawaki	Maiko Morio
26	1987	Yoyogi	Koichi Mizushima	Miho Shinoda
27	1988	Sabae	Daisuke Nishikawa	Miho Shinoda
28	1989	Wakayama	Toshiharu Sato	Makiko Sanada
29	1990	Yamato	Yutaka Aihara	Mari Kosuge
30	1991	Machida City General Gymnasium	Daisuke Nishikawa	Mari Kosuge
31	1992	Osaka Prefectural Gymnasium	Daisuke Nishikawa	Mari Kosuge
32	1993	Machida City General Gymnasium	Daisuke Nishikawa	Mari Kosuge
33	1994	Baycom Stadium	Hikaru Tanaka	Risa Sugawara
34	1995	Wakayama Prefectural Gymnasium	Hikaru Tanaka	Mari Kosuge
35	1996	Kawasaki City Todoroki Arena	Yoshiaki Hatakeda	Risa Sugawara
36	1997	Alsok Gunma General Sports Center	Yoshiaki Hatakeda	Risa Sugawara
37	1998	Abashiri City General Gymnasium	Isao Yoneda	Risa Sugawara
38	1999	Hiroshima Prefectural Sports Center	Naoya Tsukahara	Kana Yamawaki
39	2000	Kanazawa City General Gymnasium	Naoya Tsukahara	Kana Yamawaki
40	2001	Sasebo City Sports and Culture Center	Naoya Tsukahara	Ayaka Sahara
41	2002	Tokyo Metropolitan Gymnasium	Hiroyuki Tomita	Kyoko Oshima
42	2003	Tokyo Metropolitan Gymnasium	Hiroyuki Tomita	Manami Ishizaka
43	2004	Yoyogi National Stadium	Isao Yoneda	Manami Ishizaka
44	2005	Sun Dome Fukui	Hisashi Mizutori	Manami Ishizaka
45	2006	Makuhari Messe	Hiroyuki Tomita	Manami Ishizaka
46	2007	Chiba Port Arena	Shun Kuwahara	Koko Tsurumi
47	2008	Zip Arena Okayama	Hiroyuki Tomita	Kyoko Oshima
48	2009	Yoyogi National Stadium	Kohei Uchimura	Koko Tsurumi
49	2010	Yoyogi National Stadium	Kohei Uchimura	Koko Tsurumi
50	2011	Yoyogi National Stadium	Kohei Uchimura	Koko Tsurumi
51	2012	Yoyogi National Stadium	Kohei Uchimura	Rie Tanaka
52	2013	Yoyogi National Stadium	Kohei Uchimura	Asuka Teramoto
53	2014	Yoyogi National Stadium	Kohei Uchimura	Natsumi Sasada
54	2015	Yoyogi National Stadium	Kohei Uchimura	Aiko Sugihara
55	2016	Yoyogi National Stadium	Kohei Uchimura	Asuka Teramoto
56	2017	Tokyo Metropolitan Gymnasium	Kohei Uchimura	Mai Murakami
57	2018	Tokyo Metropolitan Gymnasium	Kohei Uchimura	Mai Murakami
58	2019	Musashino Forest Sport Plaza	Kakeru Tanigawa	Asuka Teramoto
	2020	The tournament was canceled due to the impact of the new coronavirus		
60	2021	Big Hat	Daiki Hashimoto	Mai Murakami
61	2022	Tokyo Metropolitan Gymnasium	Daiki Hashimoto	Shoko Miyata
62	2023	Tokyo Metropolitan Gymnasium	Daiki Hashimoto	Shoko Miyata
63	2024	Takasaki Arena	Oka Shinnosuke	Shoko Miyata
64	2025	Tokyo Metropolitan Gymnasium	Oka Shinnosuke	Aiko Sugihara
65	2026	Tokyo Metropolitan Gymnasium	Oka Shinnosuke	Misa Nishiyama

Note

* At the 13th NHK Trophy Gymnastics Championships in 1974, the East German team was invited to compete in Japan, as it was considered a foreign powerhouse at the time and the tournament was known as one of the strongest and highest-level competitions in the world. Wolfgang Thüne and Angelika Hellmann demonstrated why the East German team was so powerful at the time and achieved excellent results by winning the men’s and women’s individual all-around titles.

* Daisuke Nishikawa won the 27th NHK Trophy in 1988 at the age of 18, becoming the youngest japanese winner of an individual all-around title and went on to appear at the Seoul Olympics in the same year. In November 2019, at the All-Around Super Final held in Takasaki, Gunma Prefecture, the gymnast Daiki Hashimoto became the youngest gymnast to win the all-around title since Daisuke Nishikawa in 1988, at the age of 18 years and 3 months, a month after making his international debut.

* The 2020 edition of the NHK Trophy Gymnastics Championship was canceled due to the spread of the new coronavirus infection.

== Multiple medalists ==
All-Around Men’s
Rank	Gymnast	Nation	Years	Gold
1	Kōhei Uchimura	Japan	2009-2018	10
2	Kōji Gushiken	Japan	1979, 1981-1984	5
3	Yukio Endo	Japan	1963-1966	4
3	Shigeru Kasamatsu	Japan	1973, 1975-1977	4
3	Daisuke Nishikawa	Japan	1988, 1991-1993	4
3	Hiroyuki Tomita	Japan	2002-2003, 2006, 2008	4
7	Akinori Nakayama	Japan	1967, 1969-1970	3
7	Sawao Kato	Japan	1968, 1971-1972	3
7	Naoya Tsukahara	Japan	1999-2001	3
7	Daiki Hashimoto	Japan	2021-2023	3
7	Oka Shinnosuke	Japan	2024-2026	3
12	Hikaru Tanaka	Japan	1994-1995	2
12	Yoshiaki Hatakeda	Japan	1996-1997	2
12	Isao Yoneda	Japan	1998, 2004	2
12	Kyoji Yamawaki	Japan	1980, 1986	2
16	Takashi Ono	Japan	1962	1
16	Wolfgang Thüne	East Germany	1974	1
16	Hiroshi Kajiyama	Japan	1978	1
16	Koji Sotomura	Japan	1985	1
16	Koichi Mizushima	Japan	1987	1
16	Toshiharu Sato	Japan	1989	1
16	Yutaka Aihara	Japan	1990	1
16	Hisashi Mizutori	Japan	2005	1
16	Shun Kuwahara	Japan	2007	1
16	Kakeru Tanigawa	Japan	2019	1

All-Around Women's
Rank	Gymnast	Nation	Years	Gold
1	Mari Kosuge	Japan	1990-1993, 1995	5
2	Yayoi Kano	Japan	1979-1982	4
2	Risa Sugawara	Japan	1994, 1996-1998	4
2	Manami Ishizaka	Japan	2003-2006	4
2	Koko Tsurumi	Japan	2007, 2009-2011	4
6	Taki Shibuya	Japan	1965-1967	3
6	Maiko Morio	Japan	1983-1984, 1986	3
6	Miho Shinoda	Japan	1985, 1987-1988	3
6	Asuka Teramoto	Japan	2013, 2016, 2019	3
6	Mai Murakami	Japan	2017-2018, 2021	3
6	Shoko Miyata	Japan	2022-2024	3
12	Chieko Oda	Japan	1969-1970	2
12	Miyuki Matsuhisa	Japan	1971, 1975	2
12	Eiko Hirashima	Japan	1972-1973	2
12	Satoko Okazaki	Japan	1976-1977	2
12	Kana Yamawaki	Japan	1999-2000	2
12	Kyoko Oshima	Japan	2002, 2008	2
12	Aiko Sugihara	Japan	2015, 2025	2
19	Toshiko Shirasu	Japan	1962	1
19	Hiroko Tsuji	Japan	1963	1
19	Keiko Tanaka-Ikeda	Japan	1964	1
19	Taniko Nakamura	Japan	1968	1
19	Angelika Hellmann	East Germany	1974	1
19	Sakiko Nozawa	Japan	1978	1
19	Makiko Sanada	Japan	1989	1
19	Ayaka Sahara	Japan	2001	1
19	Rie Tanaka	Japan	2012	1
19	Natsumi Sasada	Japan	2014	1
19	Misa Nishiyama	Japan	2026	1
