= Japan women's national artistic gymnastics team =

Japanese national sports team

Japan
- Continental union: Asian Gymnastics Union
- National federation: Japan Gymnastics Association

Olympic Games
- Appearances: 13
- Medals: Bronze: 1964

World Championships
- Medals: Bronze: 1962, 1966, 2026

Junior World Championships
- Medals: Gold: 2023; Silver: 2025

Youth Olympic Games
- Medals: Silver: 2026

The Japan women's national artistic gymnastics team represents Japan in FIG international competitions.

== History ==
Japan has participated in the Olympic Games women's team competition 13 times and has won one team medal, a bronze in 1964. Mai Murakami won Japan's first individual Olympic medal in women's artistic gymnastics: a bronze on floor exercise at the 2020 Olympic Games in Tokyo. The team has also won two medals at the World Artistic Gymnastics Championships.

== Team competition results ==
=== Olympic Games ===
Year	Position	Squad
1956	6th place	
1960	4th place	
1964	bronze medal	Toshiko Aihara, Ginko Chiba, Keiko Ikeda, Taniko Nakamura, Kiyoko Ono, Hiroko Tsuji
1968	4th place	
1972	7th place	
1976	8th place	
1984	6th place	
1988	12th place	
1996	12th place	
2008	5th place	
2012	8th place	
2016	4th place	
2020	5th place	Hitomi Hatakeda, Yuna Hiraiwa, Mai Murakami, Aiko Sugihara
2024	8th place	Rina Kishi, Haruka Nakamura, Mana Okamura, Kohane Ushioku

=== Junior World Championships ===
Year	Position	Squad
2019	11th place	Chiaki Hatakeda, Shoko Miyata, Hazuki Watanabe
2023	gold medal	Mika Mizuno, Haruka Nakamura, Sara Yamaguchi, Saki Kawakami
2025	silver medal	Yume Minamino, Misa Nishiyama, Risora Ogawa, Rinon Muneta

== Most decorated gymnasts ==
This list includes all Japanese female artistic gymnasts who have won a medal at the Olympic Games or the World Artistic Gymnastics Championships.

Rank	Gymnast	Team	AA	VT	UB	BB	FX	Olympic Total	World Total	Total
1	Keiko Tanaka-Ikeda	1964; 1962; 1966	1966		1966	1954; 1958; 1962	1958	1	8	9
2	Mai Murakami		2018			2021	2020; 2017; 2021; 2018	1	5	6
3	Taniko Nakamura-Mitsukuri	1964; 1962; 1966			1966			1	3	4
4	Aiko Sugihara	2026				2025	2025	0	3	3
5	Kōko Tsurumi		2009		2009			0	2	2
6	Ginko Abukawa-Chiba, Kiyoko Ono, Toshiko Shirasu-Aihara, Hiroko Tsuji	1964; 1962						1	1	2
10	Urara Ashikawa					2021		0	1	1
10	Hazuki Watanabe					2022		0	1	1
12	Taki Shibuya, Hiroko Ikenada, Yasuko Furuyama, Mitsuko Kandori	1966						0	1	1
12	Miyata Shoko					2022		0	1	1
12	Rina Kishi, Haruka Nakamura, Misa Nishiyama, Mana Okamura, Sara Yamaguchi	2026						0	1	1

== See also ==
- List of Olympic female artistic gymnasts for Japan
- Japan at the World Artistic Gymnastics Championships
- Japan men's national gymnastics team
