= Japan at the World Artistic Gymnastics Championships =

Gymnastics Championships

- Flag of Japan
- IOC code: JPN
- Medals Ranked 4th: Gold 59 Silver 62 Bronze 73 Total 194

Although Japanese gymnasts competed at numerous Olympic Games as early as 1932, they didn't compete at the World Artistic Gymnastics Championships until 1954. The men's team immediately achieved success, winning silver in the team event and individually Masao Takemoto won gold on floor exercise. The women's team won their first team medal, a bronze, in 1962.

== Medalists ==
Medal	Name	Year	Event
Silver	Akitomo Kaneko, Akira Kono, Masami Kubota, Tetsumi Nabeya, Takashi Ono, Yoshiyuki Oshima, Masao Takemoto	(Italy) 1954 Rome	Men's team
Gold	Masao Takemoto	(Italy) 1954 Rome	Men's floor exercise
Gold	Keiko Tanaka	(Italy) 1954 Rome	Women's balance beam
Bronze	Masao Takemoto	(Italy) 1954 Rome	Men's parallel bars
Silver	Nobuyuki Aihara, Akira Kono, Takashi Ono, Masao Takemoto, Katsumi Terai, Shinsaku Tsukawaki	(Soviet Union) 1958 Moscow	Men's team
Silver	Takashi Ono	(Soviet Union) 1958 Moscow	Men's all-around
Gold	Masao Takemoto	(Soviet Union) 1958 Moscow	Men's floor exercise
Silver	Takashi Ono	(Soviet Union) 1958 Moscow	Men's floor exercise
Silver	Nobuyuki Aihara	(Soviet Union) 1958 Moscow	Men's rings
Silver	Masao Takemoto	(Soviet Union) 1958 Moscow	Men's vault
Bronze	Takashi Ono	(Soviet Union) 1958 Moscow	Men's vault
Bronze	Keiko Tanaka	(Soviet Union) 1958 Moscow	Women's balance beam
Silver	Takashi Ono	(Soviet Union) 1958 Moscow	Men's parallel bars
Bronze	Keiko Tanaka	(Soviet Union) 1958 Moscow	Women's floor exercise
Bronze	Masao Takemoto	(Soviet Union) 1958 Moscow	Men's horizontal bar
Gold	Nobuyuki Aihara, Yukio Endo, Takashi Mitsukuri, Takashi Ono, Shuji Tsurumi, Haruhiro Yamashita	(Czechoslovakia) 1962 Prague	Men's team
Bronze	Ginko Abukawa, Keiko Ikeda, Taniko Nakamura, Kiyoko Ono, Toshiko Shirasu, Hiroko Tsuji	(Czechoslovakia) 1962 Prague	Women's team
Silver	Yukio Endo	(Czechoslovakia) 1962 Prague	Men's all-around
Gold	Nobuyuki Aihara	(Czechoslovakia) 1962 Prague	Men's floor exercise
Gold	Yukio Endo	(Czechoslovakia) 1962 Prague	Men's floor exercise
Silver	Yukio Endo	(Czechoslovakia) 1962 Prague	Men's rings
Silver	Haruhiro Yamashita	(Czechoslovakia) 1962 Prague	Men's vault
Bronze	Yukio Endo	(Czechoslovakia) 1962 Prague	Men's vault
Bronze	Keiko Ikeda	(Czechoslovakia) 1962 Prague	Women's balance beam
Bronze	Yukio Endo	(Czechoslovakia) 1962 Prague	Men's parallel bars
Gold	Takashi Ono	(Czechoslovakia) 1962 Prague	Men's horizontal bar
Silver	Yukio Endo	(Czechoslovakia) 1962 Prague	Men's horizontal bar
Gold	Shuji Tsurumi, Akinori Nakayama, Takeshi Katō, Yukio Endo, Takashi Mitsukuri, Haruhiro Matsuda	(West Germany) 1966 Dortmund	Men's team
Bronze	Keiko Ikeda, Taki Shibuya, Hiroko Ikenada, Taniko Mitsukuri, Yasuko Furuyama, Mitsuko Kandori	(West Germany) 1966 Dortmund	Women's team
Silver	Shuji Tsurumi	(West Germany) 1966 Dortmund	Men's all-around
Bronze	Akinori Nakayama	(West Germany) 1966 Dortmund	Men's all-around
Bronze	Keiko Ikeda	(West Germany) 1966 Dortmund	Women's all-around
Gold	Akinori Nakayama	(West Germany) 1966 Dortmund	Men's floor exercise
Silver	Yukio Endo	(West Germany) 1966 Dortmund	Men's floor exercise
Bronze	Takeshi Katō	(West Germany) 1966 Dortmund	Men's pommel horse
Silver	Keiko Ikeda	(West Germany) 1966 Dortmund	Women's uneven bars
Bronze	Taniko Mitsukuri	(West Germany) 1966 Dortmund	Women's uneven bars
Silver	Akinori Nakayama	(West Germany) 1966 Dortmund	Men's rings
Gold	Haruhiro Matsuda	(West Germany) 1966 Dortmund	Men's vault
Silver	Takeshi Katō	(West Germany) 1966 Dortmund	Men's vault
Bronze	Akinori Nakayama	(West Germany) 1966 Dortmund	Men's vault
Gold	Akinori Nakayama	(West Germany) 1966 Dortmund	Men's horizontal bar
Silver	Yukio Endo	(West Germany) 1966 Dortmund	Men's horizontal bar
Bronze	Takashi Mitsukuri	(West Germany) 1966 Dortmund	Men's horizontal bar
Gold	Eizo Kenmotsu, Mitsuo Tsukahara, Akinori Nakayama, Fumio Honma, Takuji Hayata, Takeshi Katō	(Socialist Federal Republic of Yugoslavia) 1970 Ljubljana	Men's team
Gold	Eizo Kenmotsu	(Socialist Federal Republic of Yugoslavia) 1970 Ljubljana	Men's all-around
Silver	Mitsuo Tsukahara	(Socialist Federal Republic of Yugoslavia) 1970 Ljubljana	Men's all-around
Bronze	Akinori Nakayama	(Socialist Federal Republic of Yugoslavia) 1970 Ljubljana	Men's all-around
Gold	Akinori Nakayama	(Socialist Federal Republic of Yugoslavia) 1970 Ljubljana	Men's floor exercise
Silver	Eizo Kenmotsu	(Socialist Federal Republic of Yugoslavia) 1970 Ljubljana	Men's floor exercise
Bronze	Takeshi Katō	(Socialist Federal Republic of Yugoslavia) 1970 Ljubljana	Men's floor exercise
Silver	Eizo Kenmotsu	(Socialist Federal Republic of Yugoslavia) 1970 Ljubljana	Men's pommel horse
Gold	Akinori Nakayama	(Socialist Federal Republic of Yugoslavia) 1970 Ljubljana	Men's rings
Silver	Mitsuo Tsukahara	(Socialist Federal Republic of Yugoslavia) 1970 Ljubljana	Men's rings
Gold	Mitsuo Tsukahara	(Socialist Federal Republic of Yugoslavia) 1970 Ljubljana	Men's vault
Bronze	Takeshi Katō	(Socialist Federal Republic of Yugoslavia) 1970 Ljubljana	Men's vault
Gold	Akinori Nakayama	(Socialist Federal Republic of Yugoslavia) 1970 Ljubljana	Men's parallel bars
Silver	Eizo Kenmotsu	(Socialist Federal Republic of Yugoslavia) 1970 Ljubljana	Men's parallel bars
Gold	Eizo Kenmotsu	(Socialist Federal Republic of Yugoslavia) 1970 Ljubljana	Men's horizontal bar
Silver	Akinori Nakayama	(Socialist Federal Republic of Yugoslavia) 1970 Ljubljana	Men's horizontal bar
Bronze	Takuji Hayata	(Socialist Federal Republic of Yugoslavia) 1970 Ljubljana	Men's horizontal bar
Gold	Shigeru Kasamatsu, Eizo Kenmotsu, Mitsuo Tsukahara, Hiroshi Kajiyama, Fumio Honma, Sawao Kato	(Bulgaria) 1974 Varna	Men's team
Gold	Shigeru Kasamatsu	(Bulgaria) 1974 Varna	Men's all-around
Bronze	Eizo Kenmotsu	(Bulgaria) 1974 Varna	Men's all-around
Gold	Shigeru Kasamatsu	(Bulgaria) 1974 Varna	Men's floor exercise
Silver	Hiroshi Kajiyama	(Bulgaria) 1974 Varna	Men's floor exercise
Bronze	Eizo Kenmotsu	(Bulgaria) 1974 Varna	Men's pommel horse
Gold	Shigeru Kasamatsu	(Bulgaria) 1974 Varna	Men's vault
Bronze	Hiroshi Kajiyama	(Bulgaria) 1974 Varna	Men's vault
Gold	Eizo Kenmotsu	(Bulgaria) 1974 Varna	Men's parallel bars
Bronze	Eizo Kenmotsu	(Bulgaria) 1974 Varna	Men's horizontal bar
Gold	Hiroshi Kajiyama, Shigeru Kasamatsu, Eizo Kenmotsu, Junichi Shimizu, Shinzo Shiraishi, Mitsuo Tsukahara	(France) 1978 Strasbourg	Men's team
Silver	Eizo Kenmotsu	(France) 1978 Strasbourg	Men's all-around
Silver	Shigeru Kasamatsu	(France) 1978 Strasbourg	Men's floor exercise
Gold	Junichi Shimizu	(France) 1978 Strasbourg	Men's vault
Gold	Eizo Kenmotsu	(France) 1978 Strasbourg	Men's parallel bars
Silver	Hiroshi Kajiyama	(France) 1978 Strasbourg	Men's parallel bars
Gold	Shigeru Kasamatsu	(France) 1978 Strasbourg	Men's horizontal bar
Silver	Hiroshi Kajiyama, Shigeru Kasamatsu, Nobuyuki Kajitani, Toshiomi Nishikii, Koji Gushiken, Eizo Kenmotsu	(United States) 1979 Fort Worth	Men's team
Bronze	Koji Gushiken	(United States) 1979 Fort Worth	Men's pommel horse
Silver	Nobuyuki Kajitani, Koji Gushiken, Koji Sotomura, Kiyoshi Goto, Kyoji Yamawaki, Toshiro Kanai	(Soviet Union) 1981 Moscow	Men's team
Bronze	Koji Gushiken	(Soviet Union) 1981 Moscow	Men's all-around
Bronze	Koji Gushiken	(Soviet Union) 1981 Moscow	Men's floor exercise
Gold	Koji Gushiken	(Soviet Union) 1981 Moscow	Men's parallel bars
Bronze	Nobuyuki Kajitani	(Soviet Union) 1981 Moscow	Men's parallel bars
Bronze	Koji Gushiken, Koji Sotomura, Nobuyuki Kajitani, Mitsuaki Watanabe, Noritoshi Hirata, Shinji Morisue	(Hungary) 1983 Budapest	Men's team
Silver	Koji Gushiken	(Hungary) 1983 Budapest	Men's all-around
Gold	Koji Gushiken	(Hungary) 1983 Budapest	Men's rings
Bronze	Koji Sotomura	(Hungary) 1983 Budapest	Men's parallel bars
Bronze	Hiroyuki Konishi	(Canada) 1985 Montreal	Men's pommel horse
Bronze	Kyoji Yamawaki	(Canada) 1985 Montreal	Men's rings
Bronze	Koji Gushiken	(Canada) 1985 Montreal	Men's parallel bars
Bronze	Mitsuaki Watanabe	(Canada) 1985 Montreal	Men's horizontal bar
Bronze	Yukio Iketani	(West Germany) 1989 Stuttgart	Men's horizontal bar
Bronze	Daisuke Nishikawa	(United States) 1991 Indianapolis	Men's floor exercise
Bronze	Yutaka Aihara	(United States) 1991 Indianapolis	Men's vault
Silver	Yoshiaki Hatakeda, Daisuke Nishikawa, Hikaru Tanaka, Toshiharu Sato, Masayuki Matsunaga, Hiromasa Masuda, Masayoshi Maeda	(Japan) 1995 Sabae	Men's team
Silver	Yoshiaki Hatakeda	(Japan) 1995 Sabae	Men's pommel horse
Bronze	Hikaru Tanaka	(Japan) 1995 Sabae	Men's parallel bars
Silver	Yoshiaki Hatakeda	(Japan) 1995 Sabae	Men's horizontal bar
Bronze	Naoya Tsukahara	(Switzerland) 1997 Lausanne	Men's all-around
Bronze	Naoya Tsukahara	(Switzerland) 1997 Lausanne	Men's parallel bars
Silver	Naoya Tsukahara	(China) 1999 Tianjin	Men's all-around
Silver	Naoya Tsukahara	(China) 1999 Tianjin	Men's parallel bars
Bronze	Takehiro Kashima	(Hungary) 2002 Debrecen	Men's pommel horse
Bronze	Takehiro Kashima, Hiroyuki Tomita, Naoya Tsukahara, Tatsuya Yamada	(United States) 2003 Anaheim	Men's team
Bronze	Hiroyuki Tomita	(United States) 2003 Anaheim	Men's all-around
Gold	Takehiro Kashima	(United States) 2003 Anaheim	Men's pommel horse
Gold	Takehiro Kashima	(United States) 2003 Anaheim	Men's horizontal bar
Gold	Hiroyuki Tomita	(Australia) 2005 Melbourne	Men's all-around
Silver	Hisashi Mizutori	(Australia) 2005 Melbourne	Men's all-around
Bronze	Takehiro Kashima	(Australia) 2005 Melbourne	Men's pommel horse
Bronze	Hisashi Mizutori, Takehito Mori, Takuya Nakase, Eichi Sekiguchi, Hiroyuki Tomita, Naoya Tsukahara	(Denmark) 2006 Aarhus	Men's team
Silver	Hiroyuki Tomita	(Denmark) 2006 Aarhus	Men's all-around
Silver	Hiroyuki Tomita	(Denmark) 2006 Aarhus	Men's parallel bars
Silver	Hisashi Mizutori, Hiroyuki Tomita, Yosuke Hoshi, Makoto Okiguchi, Takuya Nakase, Shun Kuwahara	(Germany) 2007 Stuttgart	Men's team
Bronze	Hisashi Mizutori	(Germany) 2007 Stuttgart	Men's all-around
Bronze	Hisashi Mizutori	(Germany) 2007 Stuttgart	Men's floor exercise
Bronze	Hisashi Mizutori	(Germany) 2007 Stuttgart	Men's horizontal bar
Gold	Kōhei Uchimura	(United Kingdom) 2009 London	Men's all-around
Bronze	Kōko Tsurumi	(United Kingdom) 2009 London	Women's all-around
Silver	Kōko Tsurumi	(United Kingdom) 2009 London	Women's uneven bars
Bronze	Kazuhito Tanaka	(United Kingdom) 2009 London	Men's parallel bars
Silver	Kōhei Uchimura, Koji Yamamuro, Koji Uematsu, Kazuhito Tanaka, Kenya Kobayashi, Tatsuki Nakashima	(Netherlands) 2010 Rotterdam	Men's team
Gold	Kōhei Uchimura	(Netherlands) 2010 Rotterdam	Men's all-around
Silver	Kōhei Uchimura	(Netherlands) 2010 Rotterdam	Men's floor exercise
Bronze	Kōhei Uchimura	(Netherlands) 2010 Rotterdam	Men's parallel bars
Silver	Kōhei Uchimura, Kazuhito Tanaka, Kenya Kobayashi, Koji Yamamuro, Makoto Okiguchi, Yusuke Tanaka	(Japan) 2011 Tokyo	Men's team
Gold	Kōhei Uchimura	(Japan) 2011 Tokyo	Men's all-around
Bronze	Koji Yamamuro	(Japan) 2011 Tokyo	Men's all-around
Gold	Kōhei Uchimura	(Japan) 2011 Tokyo	Men's floor exercise
Bronze	Koji Yamamuro	(Japan) 2011 Tokyo	Men's rings
Bronze	Makoto Okiguchi	(Japan) 2011 Tokyo	Men's vault
Bronze	Kōhei Uchimura	(Japan) 2011 Tokyo	Men's horizontal bar
Gold	Kōhei Uchimura	(Belgium) 2013 Antwerp	Men's all-around
Silver	Ryohei Kato	(Belgium) 2013 Antwerp	Men's all-around
Gold	Kenzō Shirai	(Belgium) 2013 Antwerp	Men's floor exercise
Bronze	Kōhei Uchimura	(Belgium) 2013 Antwerp	Men's floor exercise
Gold	Kohei Kameyama	(Belgium) 2013 Antwerp	Men's pommel horse
Gold	Kōhei Uchimura	(Belgium) 2013 Antwerp	Men's parallel bars
Bronze	Kōhei Uchimura	(Belgium) 2013 Antwerp	Men's horizontal bar
Silver	Kohei Kameyama, Ryohei Kato, Shogo Nonomura, Kenzō Shirai, Yusuke Tanaka, Kōhei Uchimura, Kazuyuki Takeda	(China) 2014 Nanning	Men's team
Gold	Kōhei Uchimura	(China) 2014 Nanning	Men's all-around
Bronze	Yusuke Tanaka	(China) 2014 Nanning	Men's all-around
Silver	Kenzō Shirai	(China) 2014 Nanning	Men's floor exercise
Bronze	Ryohei Kato	(China) 2014 Nanning	Men's parallel bars
Silver	Kōhei Uchimura	(China) 2014 Nanning	Men's horizontal bar
Gold	Naoto Hayasaka, Ryohei Kato, Kazuma Kaya, Kenzō Shirai, Yusuke Tanaka, Kōhei Uchimura, Tomomasa Hasegawa	(United Kingdom) 2015 Glasgow	Men's team
Gold	Kōhei Uchimura	(United Kingdom) 2015 Glasgow	Men's all-around
Gold	Kenzō Shirai	(United Kingdom) 2015 Glasgow	Men's floor exercise
Bronze	Kazuma Kaya	(United Kingdom) 2015 Glasgow	Men's pommel horse
Gold	Kōhei Uchimura	(United Kingdom) 2015 Glasgow	Men's horizontal bar
Bronze	Kenzō Shirai	(Canada) 2017 Montreal	Men's all-around
Gold	Kenzō Shirai	(Canada) 2017 Montreal	Men's floor exercise
Gold	Kenzō Shirai	(Canada) 2017 Montreal	Men's vault
Gold	Mai Murakami	(Canada) 2017 Montreal	Women's floor exercise
Bronze	Kazuma Kaya, Kenzō Shirai, Yusuke Tanaka, Wataru Tanigawa, Kōhei Uchimura, Kakeru Tanigawa	(Qatar) 2018 Doha	Men's team
Silver	Mai Murakami	(Qatar) 2018 Doha	Women's all-around
Silver	Kenzō Shirai	(Qatar) 2018 Doha	Men's floor exercise
Bronze	Kenzō Shirai	(Qatar) 2018 Doha	Men's vault
Bronze	Mai Murakami	(Qatar) 2018 Doha	Women's floor exercise
Silver	Kōhei Uchimura	(Qatar) 2018 Doha	Men's horizontal bar
Bronze	Daiki Hashimoto, Yuya Kamoto, Kazuma Kaya, Kakeru Tanigawa, Wataru Tanigawa, Shogo Nonomura	(Germany) 2019 Stuttgart	Men's team
Bronze	Kazuma Kaya	(Germany) 2019 Stuttgart	Men's parallel bars
Silver	Daiki Hashimoto	(Japan) 2021 Kitakyushu	Men's all-around
Silver	Kazuki Minami	(Japan) 2021 Kitakyushu	Men's floor exercise
Silver	Kazuma Kaya	(Japan) 2021 Kitakyushu	Men's pommel horse
Silver	Hidenobu Yonekura	(Japan) 2021 Kitakyushu	Men's vault
Gold	Urara Ashikawa	(Japan) 2021 Kitakyushu	Women's balance beam
Bronze	Mai Murakami	(Japan) 2021 Kitakyushu	Women's balance beam
Gold	Mai Murakami	(Japan) 2021 Kitakyushu	Women's floor exercise
Silver	Daiki Hashimoto	(Japan) 2021 Kitakyushu	Men's horizontal bar
Silver	Ryosuke Doi, Daiki Hashimoto, Yuya Kamoto, Kakeru Tanigawa, Wataru Tanigawa, Kazuma Kaya	(United Kingdom) 2022 Liverpool	Men's team
Gold	Daiki Hashimoto	(United Kingdom) 2022 Liverpool	Men's all-around
Bronze	Wataru Tanigawa	(United Kingdom) 2022 Liverpool	Men's all-around
Silver	Daiki Hashimoto	(United Kingdom) 2022 Liverpool	Men's floor exercise
Bronze	Ryosuke Doi	(United Kingdom) 2022 Liverpool	Men's floor exercise
Gold	Hazuki Watanabe	(United Kingdom) 2022 Liverpool	Women's balance beam
Bronze	Shoko Miyata	(United Kingdom) 2022 Liverpool	Women's balance beam
Silver	Daiki Hashimoto	(United Kingdom) 2022 Liverpool	Men's horizontal bar
Gold	Kenta Chiba, Daiki Hashimoto, Kazuma Kaya, Kazuki Minami, Kaito Sugimoto, Teppei Miwa	(Belgium) 2023 Antwerp	Men's team
Gold	Daiki Hashimoto	(Belgium) 2023 Antwerp	Men's all-around
Silver	Kazuki Minami	(Belgium) 2023 Antwerp	Men's floor exercise
Bronze	Kaito Sugimoto	(Belgium) 2023 Antwerp	Men's parallel bars
Gold	Daiki Hashimoto	(Belgium) 2023 Antwerp	Men's horizontal bar
Gold	Daiki Hashimoto	(Indonesia) 2025 Jakarta	Men's all-around
Bronze	Aiko Sugihara	(Indonesia) 2025 Jakarta	Women's balance beam
Silver	Tomoharu Tsunogai	(Indonesia) 2025 Jakarta	Men's parallel bars
Gold	Aiko Sugihara	(Indonesia) 2025 Jakarta	Women's floor exercise
Silver	Daiki Hashimoto	(Indonesia) 2025 Jakarta	Men's horizontal bar
Gold	Ryosuke Doi, Daiki Hashimoto, Shohei Kawakami, Fusuke Maeda, Shinnosuke Oka, Nao Ojima	(Netherlands) 2026 Rotterdam	Men's team
Bronze	Rina Kishi, Haruka Nakamura, Misa Nishiyama, Mana Okamura, Aiko Sugihara, Sara Yamaguchi	(Netherlands) 2026 Rotterdam	Women's team
Gold	Daiki Hashimoto	(Netherlands) 2026 Rotterdam	Men's all-around
Silver	Shinnosuke Oka	(Netherlands) 2026 Rotterdam	Men's horizontal bar

== Medal tables ==
=== By gender ===
Gender	Gold	Silver	Bronze	Total
Men	53	57	60	170
Women	5	3	12	20

=== By event ===
Event	Gold	Silver	Bronze	Total
Men's individual all-around	13	11	11	35
Men's floor exercise	11	11	6	28
Men's team	8	10	5	23
Men's horizontal bar	7	10	9	26
Men's parallel bars	5	5	13	23
Men's vault	5	4	8	17
Women's balance beam	3	0	5	8
Women's floor exercise	3	0	2	5
Men's rings	2	4	2	8
Men's pommel horse	2	3	7	12
Women's uneven bars	0	2	1	3
Women's individual all-around	0	1	2	3
Women's team	0	0	3	3
Women's vault	0	0	0	0

== Junior World medalists ==
Medal	Name	Year	Event
Gold	Ryosuke Doi, Takeru Kitazono, Shinnosuke Oka, Azusa Emata	(Hungary) 2019 Győr	Boys' team
Gold	Shinnosuke Oka	(Hungary) 2019 Győr	Boys' all-around
Silver	Ryosuke Doi	(Hungary) 2019 Győr	Boys' all-around
Gold	Takeru Kitazono	(Hungary) 2019 Győr	Boys' pommel horse
Silver	Shinnosuke Oka	(Hungary) 2019 Győr	Boys' pommel horse
Gold	Takeru Kitazono	(Hungary) 2019 Győr	Boys' parallel bars
Bronze	Shinnosuke Oka	(Hungary) 2019 Győr	Boys' parallel bars
Gold	Haruto Kamiyama, Masaharu Tanida, Tomoharu Tsunogai, Renato Noda	(Turkey) 2023 Antalya	Boys' team
Gold	Mika Mizuno, Haruka Nakamura, Sara Yamaguchi, Saki Kawakami	(Turkey) 2023 Antalya	Girls' team
Gold	Haruka Nakamura	(Turkey) 2023 Antalya	Girls' all-around
Silver	Sara Yamaguchi	(Turkey) 2023 Antalya	Girls' all-around
Silver	Masaharu Tanida	(Turkey) 2023 Antalya	Boys' rings
Gold	Tomoharu Tsunogai	(Turkey) 2023 Antalya	Boys' parallel bars
Bronze	Haruka Nakamura	(Turkey) 2023 Antalya	Girls' floor exercise
Gold	Tomoharu Tsunogai	(Turkey) 2023 Antalya	Boys' horizontal bar
Silver	Taiki Kakutani, Nao Ojima, Eijun Yasui	(Philippines) 2025 Manila	Boys' team
Silver	Yume Minamino, Misa Nishiyama, Risora Ogawa	(Philippines) 2025 Manila	Girls' team
Silver	Nao Ojima	(Philippines) 2025 Manila	Boys' all-around
Gold	Yume Minamino	(Philippines) 2025 Manila	Girls' all-around
Bronze	Misa Nishiyama	(Philippines) 2025 Manila	Girls' all-around
Silver	Misa Nishiyama	(Philippines) 2025 Manila	Girls' vault
Bronze	Nao Ojima	(Philippines) 2025 Manila	Boys' pommel horse
Silver	Yume Minamino	(Philippines) 2025 Manila	Girls' balance beam
Gold	Nao Ojima	(Philippines) 2025 Manila	Boys' parallel bars
Gold	Misa Nishiyama	(Philippines) 2025 Manila	Girls' floor exercise
