= Yamawaki =

Yamawaki (written: 山脇) is a Japanese surname. Notable people with the surname include:

- Iwao Yamawaki (山脇 巌; 1898–1987), Japanese photographer
- Kana Yamawaki (山脇 佳奈; born 1984), Japanese gymnast
- Kyoji Yamawaki (山脇 恭二; born 1957), Japanese gymnast
