= Hitomi Hatakeda =

Japanese artistic gymnast (born 2000)

- Born: 1 September 2000 (age 26) Machida, Tokyo
- Height: 155 cm (5 ft 1 in)

Gymnastics career
- Discipline: Women's artistic gymnastics
- Country represented: Japan (2017–2021)
- Club: Central Meguro
- Head coaches: Yukiko Hatakeda, Hikaru Tanaka
- Retired: 22 March 2022
Medal record
Representing Japan
Summer Universiade
Gold medal – first place	2019 Naples	Team
Gold medal – first place	2019 Naples	All-around
Gold medal – first place	2019 Naples	Uneven bars
Gold medal – first place	2019 Naples	Balance beam
FIG World Cup
Event / 1st / 2nd / 3rd; All-Around World Cup / 0 / 0 / 1

Hitomi Hatakeda (畠田 瞳, Hatakeda Hitomi; born 1 September 2000) is a Japanese former artistic gymnast who competed at the 2020 Olympic Games. She is the 2019 Summer Universiade champion in the team, all-around, uneven bars, and balance beam. She is also the 2020 American Cup all-around bronze medalist.

== Early life ==
Hatakeda was born on 1 September 2000 in Machida, Tokyo. Her father, Yoshiaki Hatakeda, won a bronze medal at the 1992 Olympics in the team event. Her mother Yukiko is also a former gymnast and Hatakeda's personal coach. She began gymnastics at age eight because her parents encouraged her to try the sport. Her younger sister, Chiaki, is also an elite gymnast.

== Junior career ==
Hatakeda finished sixteenth in the all-around at the 2015 All-Japan Championships. Then at the NHK Trophy, she finished eleventh in the all-around. She qualified for the uneven bars and balance beam event finals at the All-Japan Event Championships, finishing seventh and fourth respectively. She made her international debut at the 2015 Voronin Cup and won a bronze medal in the team event with Wakana Inoue. In the all-around, she placed fourth behind Natalia Kapitonova, Angelina Melnikova, and Natsumi Hanashima. Then in the event finals, she placed fifth on vault and fourth on uneven bars, and she won the bronze medals on the balance beam and floor exercise.

== Senior career ==
=== 2016 ===
Hatakeda became age-eligible for senior international competition in 2016. She made her senior debut at the All-Japan Championships and finished tenth. Then at the NHK Trophy, she finished seventh. She made her senior international debut at the Gym Festival Trnava and won the all-around gold medal. In the event finals, she won gold on the uneven bars, silver on the vault, and bronze on the balance beam and floor exercise. She placed fifth on the vault and sixth on the uneven bars at the All-Japan Event Championships. Her final competition of the season was the All-Japan Team Championships where she helped her club place sixth, and she placed third in the all-around.

=== 2017 ===
Hatakeda began her season at the International Gymnix where she helped the Japanese team win the silver medal behind Canada. Individually, she won gold medals in the all-around, uneven bars, balance beam, and floor exercise, and she won bronze on the vault. Then at the All-Japan Championships, she finished thirteenth in the all-around and then seventh in the all-around at the NHK Trophy. She won the gold medal in the all-around and uneven bars and the silver medal on the vault, balance beam, and floor exercise at the Gym Festival Trnava. She also won the gold medal on the uneven bars at the All-Japan Event Championships, and she placed eighth on the vault and fourth on the balance beam. At the Arthur Gander Memorial, she won the gold medal in the all-around. She then competed at the Swiss Cup on a mixed team with Wataru Tanigawa, and they won the silver medal behind Switzerland. Then at the All-Japan Team Championships, she helped her club place fourth, and she finished second in the all-around behind Mai Murakami. Her final competition of the season was the Toyota International where she finished fourth on the uneven bars.

=== 2018 ===
Hatakeda began her season at the WOGA Classic in Plano, Texas, where she won the all-around gold medal. Then at the DTB Pokal Team Challenge, she won the all-around silver medal behind Nina Derwael and helped the Japanese team win the bronze medal. She then competed at the Birmingham World Cup, finishing fifth all-around with a score of 51.133. She then won the bronze medal in the all-around at the All-Japan Championships and at the NHK Cup both behind Mai Murakami and Asuka Teramoto. Then at the All-Japan Event Championships, she finished sixth on the uneven bars and fourth on the balance beam. At the Heerenveen Friendly, she helped the Japanese team win the gold medal. Individually, she won the gold medal on the uneven bars, the silver medal on the floor exercise, and the bronze medal in the all-around. She was selected to compete at the Doha World Championships alongside Mai Murakami, Nagi Kajita, Aiko Sugihara and Asuka Teramoto. The team finished sixth in the team final with a score of 160.262. She then helped her club finish sixth at the All-Japan Team Championships. Her final competition of the year was the Toyota International where she won the bronze medal on the vault and the silver medal on the uneven bars.

=== 2019 ===
Hatakeda finished sixth in the all-around at the Stuttgart World Cup. Then at the All-Japan Championships, she won the bronze medal in the all-around behind Asuka Teramoto and Mai Murakami, and she won the silver medal at the NHK Cup behind Teramoto. She won the gold medal on the uneven bars at the All-Japan Event Championships and the silver medal on the balance beam. At the 2019 Summer Universiade in Naples, she won the team gold medal with teammates Asuka Teramoto and Aiko Sugihara. She also won the gold medals in the all-around and on the uneven bars and balance beam. She also placed fifth on the floor exercise. She competed at the World Championships, finishing eleventh in team qualifications and helping Japan qualify as a team for the 2020 Olympics. Individually, she qualified to the all-around final and finished seventeenth with a score of 53.932. After the World Championships, she finished her season at the Toyota International and won bronze medals on vault and uneven bars and a silver medal on balance beam.

=== 2020 ===
Hatakeda won the all-around bronze medal at the American Cup with a score of 53.799, finishing behind Americans Morgan Hurd and Kayla DiCello. She was initially scheduled to compete at the Birmingham World Cup. However, the event was postponed and eventually cancelled due to the COVID-19 pandemic in the United Kingdom. She did not compete again until September when she won the all-around bronze medal behind Mai Murakami and Yuna Hiraiwa at the All-Japan Senior Championships. She then competed at the Friendship and Solidarity Competition on Team Friendship who finished second. She then won the all-around silver medal at the All-Japan Championships behind Mai Murakami.

=== 2021 ===
Hatakeda won the all-around silver medal at the All-Japan Championships behind Mai Murakami. In May, she won the silver medal at the NHK Cup and was named to represent Japan at the 2020 Summer Olympics alongside Mai Murakami, Yuna Hiraiwa and Aiko Sugihara. They finished fifth in the team final.

Hatakeda was also selected to compete at the World Championships. She qualified to the all-around final in fourth place. However, while training the day before the all-around final, she fell face-first on a transition move on the uneven bars and was taken to the hospital on a spinal board. She was diagnosed with damage to her central spinal cord and bruising of the cervical spine. She was released from the hospital after one week.

Hatakeda retired on 22 March 2022 as a result of the injury and a loss of motivation due to event postponements and cancellations during the COVID-19 pandemic.

== Competitive history ==
Year	Event	Team	AA	VT	UB	BB	FX
2015	All-Japan Championships		16				
2015	NHK Trophy		11				
2015	All-Japan Event Championships			7	4		
2015	Voronin Cup	3rd place, bronze medalist(s)	4	5	4	3rd place, bronze medalist(s)	3rd place, bronze medalist(s)
2016	All-Japan Championships		10				
2016	NHK Trophy		7				
2016	Gym Festival Trnava		1st place, gold medalist(s)	2nd place, silver medalist(s)	1st place, gold medalist(s)	3rd place, bronze medalist(s)	3rd place, bronze medalist(s)
2016	All-Japan Event Championships			5	6		
2016	All-Japan Team Championships	6	3rd place, bronze medalist(s)				
2017	International Gymnix	2nd place, silver medalist(s)	1st place, gold medalist(s)	3rd place, bronze medalist(s)	1st place, gold medalist(s)	1st place, gold medalist(s)	1st place, gold medalist(s)
2017	All-Japan Championships		13				
2017	NHK Trophy		7				
2017	Gym Festival Trnava		1st place, gold medalist(s)	2nd place, silver medalist(s)	1st place, gold medalist(s)	2nd place, silver medalist(s)	2nd place, silver medalist(s)
2017	All-Japan Event Championships			8	1st place, gold medalist(s)	4	
2017	Arthur Gander Memorial		1st place, gold medalist(s)				
2017	Swiss Cup	2nd place, silver medalist(s)					
2017	All-Japan Team Championships	4	2nd place, silver medalist(s)				
2017	Toyota International				4		
2018	WOGA Classic		1st place, gold medalist(s)				
2018	DTB Pokal Team Challenge	3rd place, bronze medalist(s)	2nd place, silver medalist(s)				
2018	Birmingham World Cup		5				
2018	All-Japan Championships		3rd place, bronze medalist(s)				
2018	NHK Trophy		3rd place, bronze medalist(s)				
2018	All-Japan Event Championships				6	4	
2018	Heerenveen Friendly	1st place, gold medalist(s)	3rd place, bronze medalist(s)		1st place, gold medalist(s)	4	2nd place, silver medalist(s)
2018	World Championships	6					
2018	All-Japan Team Championships	6					
2018	Toyota International	3rd place, bronze medalist(s)	2nd place, silver medalist(s)				
2019	Stuttgart World Cup		6				
2019	All-Japan Championships		3rd place, bronze medalist(s)				
2019	NHK Trophy		2nd place, silver medalist(s)				
2019	All-Japan Event Championships				1st place, gold medalist(s)	2nd place, silver medalist(s)	
2019	Summer Universiade	1st place, gold medalist(s)	1st place, gold medalist(s)		1st place, gold medalist(s)	1st place, gold medalist(s)	5
2019	World Championships	11	17				
2019	Toyota International	3rd place, bronze medalist(s)	3rd place, bronze medalist(s)	2nd place, silver medalist(s)			
2020	American Cup		3rd place, bronze medalist(s)				
2020	All-Japan Senior Championships		3rd place, bronze medalist(s)				
2020	Friendship and Solidarity Meet	2nd place, silver medalist(s)					
2020	All-Japan Championships		2nd place, silver medalist(s)				
2021	All-Japan Championships		2nd place, silver medalist(s)				
2021	NHK Trophy		2nd place, silver medalist(s)				
2021	All-Japan Event Championships				1st place, gold medalist(s)	7	4
2021	Olympic Games	5					
2021	World Championships		WD				
