= Risa Sugawara =

Japanese artistic gymnast

Sugawara Risa
Personal information
- Nationality: Japanese
- Born: 15 August 1977 (age 48) Saitama, Japan

Sport
- Sport: Gymnastics
Medal record
Women's artistic gymnastics
Representing Japan
Asian Games
Silver medal – second place	1994 Hiroshima	Team
Silver medal – second place	1998 Bangkok	Team
Bronze medal – third place	1998 Bangkok	All-Around
Bronze medal – third place	1998 Bangkok	Floor Exercise

Lisa Toyoshima (豊島リサ, Toyoshima Risa), née Risa Sugawara (菅原リサ, Sugawara Risa), is a Japanese gymnastics coach and former artistic gymnast. She was a five-time all-around national champion and competed at the 1996 Summer Olympics, where she finished 29th in the individual all around.

== Personal life ==
Sugawara was born in Toda, Saitama. Her parents were both gymnasts; her father, Hiroshi Sugawara won a silver team medal at the men's gymnastics event at the 1974 Asian Games, and her mother, Takako Hasegawa, competed at the 1972 Summer Olympics. Her older brother, Fumihito Sugawara, is a politician who became the mayor of Toda in 2018. When she was an active gymnast, she looked up to teammate Mari Kosuge.

== Career ==
She began gymnastics at the Toda Sports Center, where her parents coached. In 1994, she won her first national all-around title. She also competed at the 1994 Asian Games and the 1998 Asian Games, where she won silver medals with the team.

In 1996, Sugawara entered Nippon Sport Science University. That year, she tied for Japanese champion with Yuki Ohata. She represented Japan at the 1996 Summer Olympics and finished 29th in the individual all-around.

From 1997–1999, she won an additional three all-around national titles in a row. At the 1997 Summer Universiade, she won gold in the balance beam and floor finals, along with a silver on uneven bars and a bronze medal in the team event. At the 1998 Asian Games, she again won silver with the Japanese team. She also won individual bronze medals in the all-around and on the floor event.

Sugawara retired in 1999 due to injuries. She spent three years studying abroad at the Australian Institute of Sport. She now works as a coach in Toda and has two children. Her students include Olympians Hiraiwa Yuna and Rina Kishi. She has also spoken about her struggles with disordered eating to maintain her body weight during her time as a gymnast and the changing trend in women's gymnastics toward building more muscle in order to complete difficult elements.

== Competition history ==
Year	Event	Team	AA	VT	UB	BB	FX
1989	Aloha Gymfest		10	2nd place, silver medalist(s)			
1989	Japanese Championships		20				
1990	Japanese Championships		10				6
1990	NHK Cup		11				
1991	Aloha Gymfest		3rd place, bronze medalist(s)				
1991	Blume Memorial		31				
1992	Gander Memorial		6				
1992	Japanese Championships		3rd place, bronze medalist(s)			1st place, gold medalist(s)	
1992	NHK Cup		7				
1992	Pacific Alliance Championships		7	4	6		6
1992	Swiss Cup		6				
1993	Chunichi Cup		5	4	6	5	7
1993	East Asian Games		3rd place, bronze medalist(s)				
1993	Japanese Championships		4	5		1st place, gold medalist(s)	1st place, gold medalist(s)
1993	JPN-USA Dual Meet	2nd place, silver medalist(s)	4				
1993	NHK Cup		2nd place, silver medalist(s)				
1993	Tokyo Cup				7	4	8
1993	World Championships		30				
1994	McDonald's American Cup		14				
1994	Asian Games	2nd place, silver medalist(s)	5	4	3rd place, bronze medalist(s)		5
1994	Chunichi Cup		5				
1994	Fukuoka Cup			6	4	5	6
1994	International Mixed Pairs	13					
1994	Japanese Championships		1st place, gold medalist(s)		1st place, gold medalist(s)	1st place, gold medalist(s)	1st place, gold medalist(s)
1995	Aloha Gymfest		1st place, gold medalist(s)				
1995	Chunichi Cup		6	6	8	7	6
1995	Gander Memorial		7				
1995	Japanese Championships		3rd place, bronze medalist(s)	2nd place, silver medalist(s)			1st place, gold medalist(s)
1995	Pre-Olympics Test Event		14				
1995	World Championships	10	28				
1996	Chunichi Cup		4		1st place, gold medalist(s)		3rd place, bronze medalist(s)
1996	Japanese Championships		1st place, gold medalist(s)		1st place, gold medalist(s)		
1996	NHK Cup		2nd place, silver medalist(s)				
1996	Olympic Games	12	29				
1997	Visa American Cup		10				
1997	Chunichi Cup		4	6	4	5	4
1997	Japanese Championships		1st place, gold medalist(s)		2nd place, silver medalist(s)	8	2nd place, silver medalist(s)
1997	NHK Cup		1st place, gold medalist(s)				
1997	Pitari Cup		1st place, gold medalist(s)				
1997	Summer Universiade		3rd place, bronze medalist(s)		2nd place, silver medalist(s)	1st place, gold medalist(s)	1st place, gold medalist(s)
1997	Lausanne World Championships	9	25				
1998	American Classic		33				
1998	Visa American Cup		17				
1998	Asian Games	2nd place, silver medalist(s)	3rd place, bronze medalist(s)	5	4		3rd place, bronze medalist(s)
1998	China Cup		10	3rd place, bronze medalist(s)	8		
1998	Chunichi Cup		5	6	4	6	5
1998	Japanese Championships		1st place, gold medalist(s)	2nd place, silver medalist(s)	2nd place, silver medalist(s)	2nd place, silver medalist(s)	
1998	NHK Cup		1st place, gold medalist(s)				
1998	Pacific Alliance Championships		31		7		6
1998	World Cup Final					7	5
1999	Japanese Championships		1st place, gold medalist(s)		2nd place, silver medalist(s)		1st place, gold medalist(s)
1999	NHK Cup		2nd place, silver medalist(s)				
1999	World Championships	13	18				
