= Hiraiwa Yuna =

Japanese artistic gymnast

Hiraiwa Yuna 平岩 優奈
- Full name: Hiraiwa Yuna
- Born: 21 November 1998 (age 27) Nerima, Tokyo, Japan

Gymnastics career
- Discipline: Women's artistic gymnastics
- Country represented: Japan (2014, 2020–2023)
- Club: Toda Sports Club; Mukogawa Women's University; Mitsubishi Yowa Gymnastics
- Head coach: Risa Toyoshima
- Former coach: Kazukuni Ohno

Hiraiwa Yuna (平岩 優奈, Hiraiwa Yūna; born 21 November 1998) is a Japanese artistic gymnast. She is the 2014 and 2021 Japanese national all-around bronze medalist and the 2014 Japanese balance beam champion. She was a member of the Japanese teams for the 2014 World Championships and the 2020 Summer Olympics.

== Career ==
=== Junior ===
Hiraiwa made her international debut at the 2013 International Gymnix in Montreal, Canada. She finished twenty-first in the all-around, sixth on the balance beam, and fifth on the floor.

=== Senior ===
==== 2014 ====
Hiraiwa made her senior debut at the All-Japan Championships in May. She improved from her eighth-place finish in qualifications to earn the bronze medal behind Natsumi Sasada and Asuka Teramoto. Hiraiwa then finished eleventh at the NHK Cup in June. She captured the balance beam title at the All-Japan Event Championships in July. As a result, Hiraiwa was named to the Japanese team for the World Championships alongside Sasada, Teramoto, Yu Minobe, Mai Murakami, and Wakana Inoue, where she was the youngest member. At the World Championships, Hiraiwa broke her right middle finger and metacarpal bone while training on the uneven bars and returned home to Japan for further examination and treatment; she was replaced by Azumi Ishikura. Although she recovered from the hand injury, the overall experience of her sudden withdrawal caused her to suffer mental setbacks. Hiraiwa also suffered a series of injuries during the following years and described entering a "slump" in her career.

==== 2015 ====
Hiraiwa finished thirteenth in all-around qualifications at the All-Japan Championships, before going on to finish last in the final. At the NHK Trophy a month later, which combined scores from All-Japan, she improved slightly to finish twenty-first.

==== 2016 ====
Hiraiwa began her season by competing on three events (excluding uneven bars) at the WOGA Classic in Frisco, Texas, winning the silver medal on the floor behind Canadian gymnast Shallon Olsen. She then competed alongside Nagi Kajita and Sae Miyakawa at the International Gymnix in March, finishing sixth as a team. Individually, Hiraiwa was fifteenth in the all-around, seventh on the balance beam, and eighth on the floor exercise. She missed the All-Japan Championships due to injury but recovered to compete on uneven bars and balance beam at the All-Japan Event Championships the following month. She missed qualifying for the uneven bars final but reached the balance beam final in fifth place; she finished fourth in the final.

==== 2017 ====
Hiraiwa finished thirty-third in qualifications at the All-Japan Championships and did not advance to the final. She competed only on the balance beam at the All-Japan Event Championships but did not advance to the final. Competing for Mukogawa Women's University at the All-Japan Student Championships, Hiraiwa finished fifth in the all-around and won silvers on vault, balance beam, and floor exercise. She competed on three events (excluding uneven bars) for Mukogawa Women's University at the All-Japan Team Championships to help the team finish fourteenth overall.

==== 2018 ====
Hiraiwa struggled at the All-Japan Championships, finishing fifty-fifth in qualification and failing to advance to the final for a second year in a row. She competed on the balance beam and floor at the All-Japan Event Championships, qualifying in third for the balance beam and narrowly missing the floor final due to an out-of-bounds penalty. Hiraiwa captured the bronze medal behind Mai Murakami and Asuka Teramoto in the balance beam final, her first national medal since 2014. She then competed on three events for Mukogawa Women's University at the All-Japan Team Championships, including the highest score on beam and second-highest score on floor, to help the team finish seventh overall.

==== 2019 ====
Following a career-worst finish at the 2018 All-Japan Championships, Hiraiwa transferred from her college team, where she was coached by Japanese national team head coach Kazukuni Ohno, to train with 1996 Olympian Risa Toyoshima (née Sugawara) at the Toda Sports Club. She did not compete at the 2019 All-Japan Championships but returned to compete on the balance beam and floor at the All-Japan Event Championships in June. She placed twenty-first on the beam, but qualified in first place on the floor. However, Hiraiwa finished fifth in the floor final.

Hiraiwa credits the transfer to Toyoshima for gradually helping her overcome her mental struggles and fear stemming from her 2014 injury. She stated that Toyoshima taught her "doing [her] own gymnastics is more important than the result" and that Toyoshima's guidance allowed her to replace her fear with the "joy of gymnastics" again.

==== 2020 ====
After the COVID-19 pandemic limited international competitive opportunities, Hiraiwa began the season at the All-Japan Senior Championships where she surprised to win silver behind Mai Murakami and ahead of Hitomi Hatakeda. Hiraiwa finished only sixth at the All-Japan Championships in December due to issues on uneven bars resulting in a nineteenth-place finish during qualifications. However, she rebounded during the all-around final to tie Hatakeda for the second-highest score of the day behind Murakami.

==== 2021 ====
During the lead-up to the competition season, Hiraiwa experienced interruptions in her training due to the medical state of emergency induced by the COVID-19 pandemic in Japan. She opened her season at the All-Japan Championships, where she finished third in both qualifications and the all-around final to win the bronze medal behind Mai Murakami and Hitomi Hatakeda. It was her first time on the all-around podium since capturing bronze in her senior debut seven years ago. Hiraiwa then repeated her bronze medal performance at the NHK Trophy, again behind Murakami and Hatakeda, to secure one of the automatic berths on the Japanese Olympic team for the postponed 2020 Summer Olympics. After being named to the team, she noted that she "liked gymnastics more [now]" and thanked her coach, Risa Toyoshima, for rekindling her motivation to pursue the Olympic team. The Olympic Games were her first international competition since 2016, and she helped the Japanese team finish fifth by competing on the vault and balance beam in the team final. After the Olympics, she competed at the World Championships and competed on the floor exercise. She qualified for the event final where she finished eighth.

==== 2022 ====
Hiraiwa finished seventh on the balance beam at the All-Japan Event Championships.

== Competitive history ==
| Year | Event | Team | AA | VT | UB | BB | FX |
Junior
| 2013 | International Gymnix | 3rd place, bronze medalist(s) | 21 | | | | 5 |
Senior
| 2014 | All-Japan Championships | | 3rd place, bronze medalist(s) | | | | |
| 2014 | NHK Cup | | 11 | | | | |
| 2014 | All-Japan Event Championships | | | | | 1st place, gold medalist(s) | |
| 2015 | All-Japan Championships | | 24 | | | | |
| 2015 | NHK Cup | | 21 | | | | |
| 2016 | WOGA Classic | | | | | | 2nd place, silver medalist(s) |
| 2016 | International Gymnix | 6 | 15 | | | 7 | 8 |
| 2016 | All-Japan Event Championships | | | | | 4 | |
| 2017 | All-Japan Championships | | 33 | | | | |
| 2017 | All-Japan Student Championships | | 5 | 2nd place, silver medalist(s) | | 2nd place, silver medalist(s) | 2nd place, silver medalist(s) |
| 2017 | All-Japan Team Championships | 14 | | | | | |
| 2018 | All-Japan Championships | | 55 | | | | |
| 2018 | All-Japan Event Championships | | | | | 3rd place, bronze medalist(s) | |
| 2018 | All-Japan Team Championships | 7 | | | | | |
| 2019 | All-Japan Event Championships | | | | | | 5 |
| 2020 | All-Japan Senior Championships | | 2nd place, silver medalist(s) | | | | |
| 2020 | All-Japan Championships | | 6 | | | | |
| 2021 | All-Japan Championships | | 3rd place, bronze medalist(s) | | | | |
| 2021 | NHK Cup | | 3rd place, bronze medalist(s) | | | | |
| 2021 | Olympic Games | 5 | | | | | |
| 2021 | World Championships | | | | | | 8 |
| 2022 | All-Japan Event Championships | | | | | 7 | |
