= Satoko Okazaki =

Japanese gymnast

- 岡崎聡子
- Born: 13 January 1961 (age 65)

Gymnastics career
- Discipline: Women's artistic gymnastics
- Country represented: Japan
- Retired: 1978

Satoko Okazaki (岡崎 聡子, Okazaki Satoko; born 13 January 1961) is a Japanese former artistic gymnast. She competed in six events at the 1976 Summer Olympics.

== Career ==
Okazaki began ballet lessons at age 3 and gymnastics at age 9. Her mother had wanted to be a dancer or gymnast herself, but was not able to train in post-World War II Japan. Her younger sister was also a gymnast.

As a junior, she won the 1974 International Junior Championships and placed 6th the next year.

Okazaki won the vault title at the 1975 All-Japan Championships. The next year, she won the uneven bars and balance beam titles, as well as the all-around. She also won the 1976 NHK Trophy.

At just 15 years old, she won the selection meet for the 1976 Summer Olympics; she was the second-youngest member of the team, with teammate Sakiko Nozawa being 14 at the time. At the Olympics, the media nicknamed her the "Japanese Comăneci". She finished 30th in the all-around final and 8th with the Japanese team.

The year after, she won the national balance beam and floor titles. She won a second NHK title that year as well. After winning another national uneven bars title in 1978, Okazaki retired due to injuries.

== Post-gymnastics career ==
After her competitive career, Okazaki became a television personality. In the 1980s, she traveled around Japan to popularize aerobics.

== Personal life ==
Okazaki has a son and a daughter with her first husband, who she married in 1984.

She has struggled with substance use disorder. She first started using drugs while studying aerobics in Los Angeles, and she continued to use them after returning to Japan. Between 1995 and 2009, she was arrested for methamphetamine use five times and spent 10 years imprisoned in total. She wrote a memoir while imprisoned, where she described the drug-related education she and other inmates received in prison and expressed doubt that it was helpful. By 2019, she had been arrested 14 times, although not all arrests led to indictments, and both of her parents died while she was in detention or prison. In 2019, her prison diary was published in the magazine Sou, where it received a large response. During her sentencing, she committed to seeking treatment with aid from organizations that specialize in substance use disorder, and after she was released, she began focusing on treatment.
