= Shohoku College =

Japanese junior colleges

Coordinates: 35°26′06″N 139°20′49″E

Shōhoku College
- 湘北短期大学; Shōhoku tanki daigaku
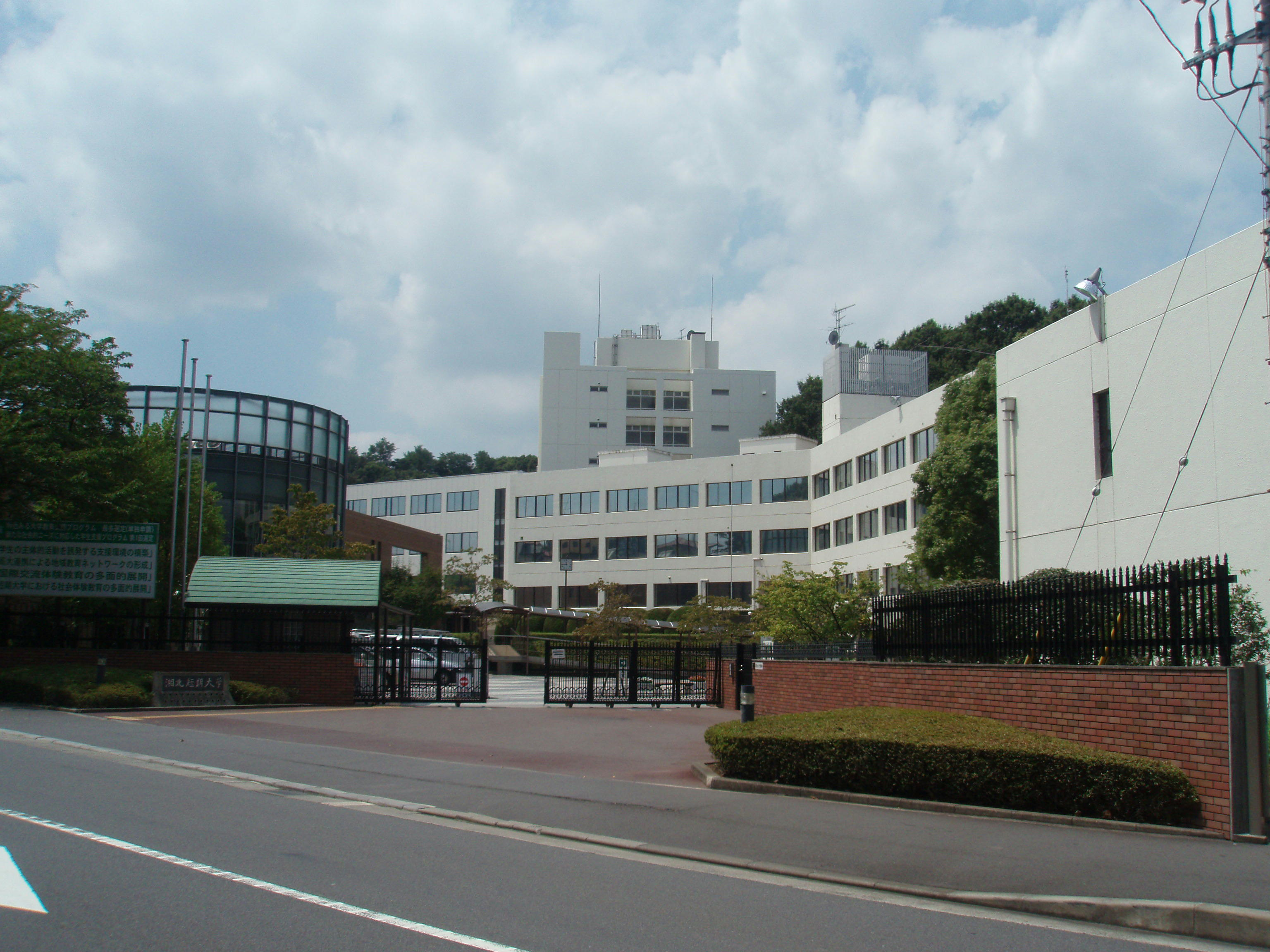
- Type: Private
- Established: 1974
- Location: Atsugi, Kanagawa, Kanagawa, Japan
- Website: Official website

Shōhoku College (湘北短期大学, Shōhoku tanki daigaku) is a private junior college in Atsugi, Kanagawa Prefecture, Japan. It was established in 1974 by Sony Corporation next to its Atsugi Technical Center.

Initially, the school offered course work in electronic engineering and in housekeeping. Courses in Kindergarten education were added in 1979, and in business administration in 1986.
