= Ginko Abukawa-Chiba =

Japanese gymnast (born 1938)

Ginko Abukawa
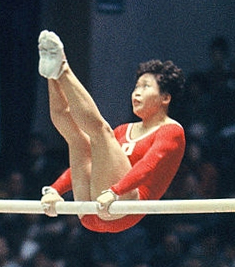
- Chiba at the 1964 Olympics

Personal information
- Full name: Ginko Abukawa-Chiba
- Born: February 25, 1938 (age 88) Ōdate, Akita Prefecture, Japan
- Height: 1.48 m (4 ft 10 in)

Gymnastics career
- Discipline: Women's artistic gymnastics
Medal record
Representing Japan
Olympic Games
Bronze medal – third place	1964 Tokyo	Team
World Championships
Bronze medal – third place	1962 Prague	Team

Ginko Chiba, née Abukawa, (千葉 吟子; born February 25, 1938) is a retired Japanese artistic gymnast. She competed in all artistic gymnastics events at the 1960 and 1964 Olympics and won a team bronze medal in 1964. She also won a bronze medal in the team event at the 1962 World Championships.

== Early life ==
Chiba was born in Ōdate, Akita Prefecture as the third of six siblings.

== Career ==
Chiba began to seriously practice gymnastics while she was in high school. She then enrolled in Nippon Sport Science University, where competition to join the collegiate team was fierce. Though her dorm had a strict curfew, she would sneak out early to practice.

At the 1960 Summer Olympics, she was generally the first or second team member to perform, as she was known for rarely making mistakes. The Japanese women's team finished fourth overall.

The 1964 Summer Olympics were held in Tokyo. Chiba wanted to compete at the Game on home soil, she continued competing. In 1962 and 1963, she won two consecutive all-around titles at the All-Japan Championship. At the 1962 World Championships, she and her teammates won the bronze medal in the team event, which was the first time a Japanese women's team reached the podium.

She began eating less shortly before the Olympics to lose weight so that her body lines would look better, and she lost 9 kilograms (20 lb). However, she found her movements and strength suffered with her weight loss, to the point where she was in danger of being replaced by an alternate. She regained much of the lost weight before the Olympics, where, with her teammates, she won the bronze team medal. Her best individual achievement was tenth place on the vault; overall, she placed 24th in the all-around.

At the 1965 All-Japan Championships, she placed 4th.

== Post-gymnastics career ==
Chiba attended Nippon Sport Science University with the goal of becoming a physical education teacher at the high school she had attended. After graduating, she worked as an assistant while training for the Tokyo Olympics. Once she finished her competitive career, she became an international judge and a professor at the University.

She participated in the torch relay for the 2020 Summer Olympics in her hometown. Speaking at a ceremony afterward, she honored the other gymnasts from Akita Prefecture who had competed with her, Takashi Ono, Yukio Endō, and Kiyoko Ono, as well as two Olympians in athletics from the prefecture, Kichizo Sasaki and Keizo Yamada.
