= Makiko Sanada =

Japanese gymnast

Personal information
- Full name: 真田マキ子 Sanada Makiko
- Nationality: Japanese
- Born: 25 November 1972 (age 52)

Sport
- Sport: Gymnastics

Makiko Sanada (真田マキ子, Sanada Makiko, born 25 November 1972) is a Japanese gymnast. She competed in six events at the 1988 Summer Olympics.
