= Keiko Tanaka-Ikeda =

Japanese gymnast (1933–2023)

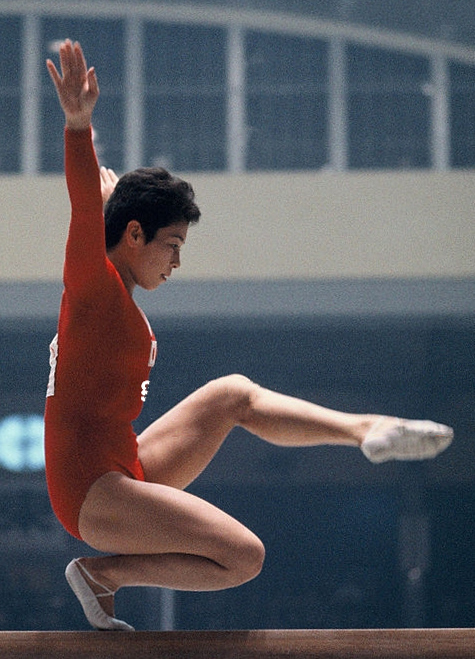
- Ikeda at the 1964 Olympics

Personal information
- Born: November 11, 1933 Mihara, Hiroshima, Japan
- Died: May 13, 2023 (aged 89)
- Height: 1.54 m (5 ft 1 in)

Gymnastics career
- Discipline: Women's artistic gymnastics
- Country represented: Japan
Medal record
Representing Japan
Olympic Games
Bronze medal – third place	1964 Tokyo	Team
World Championships
Gold medal – first place	1954 Rome	Balance beam
Silver medal – second place	1966 Dortmund	Uneven bars
Bronze medal – third place	1958 Moscow	Balance beam
Bronze medal – third place	1958 Moscow	Floor
Bronze medal – third place	1962 Prague	Balance beam
Bronze medal – third place	1962 Prague	Team
Bronze medal – third place	1966 Dortmund	All-around
Bronze medal – third place	1966 Dortmund	Team

Keiko Ikeda, née Tanaka (池田 敬子; November 11, 1933 – May 13, 2023) was a Japanese female artistic gymnast. She was the first Asian woman to win a World title, which she accomplished on the balance beam in 1954. For 63 years, she remained the only Japanese female gymnast who won a World gold medal, until Mai Murakami won the floor exercise at the 2017 World Championships. Ikeda won seven more medals at the World Championships from 1958 to 1966. She also competed at the 1956, 1960, and 1964 Olympics in all artistic gymnastics events and won a team bronze medal in 1964; her best individual achievement at the Olympics was a fourth place on the floor in 1956. For most of her career and decades afterward, she taught at Nippon Sport Science University. After her competitive career, she also worked as a coach, with a focus on junior gymnasts.

== Early life ==
Ikeda was born on Sagishima Island in the Seto Inland Sea. Her parents were owners and managers of salt evaporation ponds, and the household was relatively prosperous. She was raised by her parents as well as her grandmother and had two siblings. Her older bother was a member of the Hiroshima Prefecture assembly.

She grew up playing outside and was known as a tomboy; she participated in a variety of sports, including swimming, volleyball, and softball. In middle school, she advanced to prefectural tournaments in swimming and short-distance running.

At age ten, in 1943, she began taking ballet lessons in Mihara, Hiroshima, which she continued through high school. Her teacher at the time praised her jumping ability, and Ikeda's experiences in the class laid the foundation for her later training in gymnastics.

During World War II, while neither Sagishima nor Mihara were damaged during the air raids on Japan, her father's younger brother died in the atomic bombings of Hiroshima in 1945. The day after the bombings, her father went to look for his brother in Hiroshima. He died that winter due to exposure to the radiation.

== Career ==
=== Early gymnastics career ===
In 1949, she enrolled in Hiroshima Prefectural Mihara Senior High School. She became a member of the school's tennis club. The advisor for the gymnastics club scouted her after seeing her play on a horizontal bar during her club activities, and she joined the gymnastics club. Soon after, she began performing jumps and turns on the balance beam, to the surprise of those around her. Having become absorbed with gymnastics, she quit ballet lessons. Her family knew nothing about gymnastics, and when she performed a somersault in front of her grandmother, she was scolded: "What kind of girl opens her legs like that?"

Three months after starting gymnastics, she won the prefectural tournament. She entered the 1949 National Sports Festival of Japan in Tokyo and finished in 6th place. Her results were reported in a local newspaper, The Chugoku Shimbun, and brought attention to her in her hometown.

In 1952, she enrolled in Nippon Sport Science University, influenced by another student known as the "God of Gymnastics", Masao Takemoto. Ikeda's class was the first that included women, and their education was the same as the men's. Men and women also trained together in the university's gymnastics club, and the women trained men's apparatuses such as the rings. Ikeda flourished as a gymnast with the increased strength she gained at her university, combined with the expressiveness she had learned in ballet. In 1953, she won her first title at the All-Japan Championships.

=== 1954–1958: "The Lover of Rome" ===
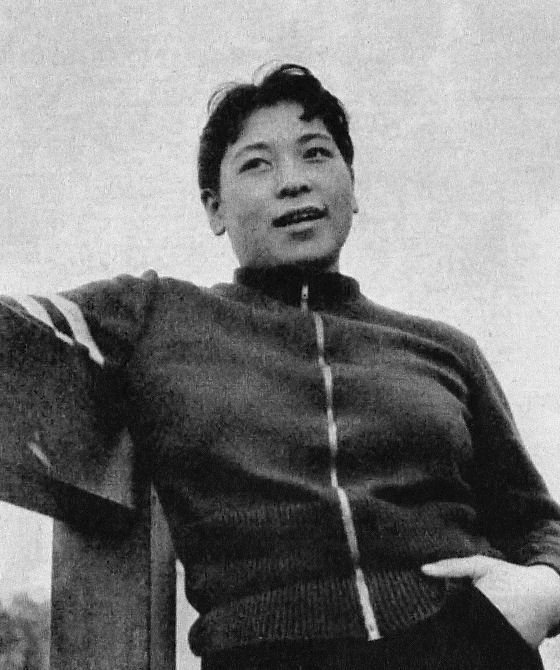
Ikeda around 1956

In 1954, at age 19, she made her first overseas trip along with the Japanese men's gymnastics team. This was the first time a Japanese women's gymnast had competed abroad. Together with the men's team, she competed at the 1954 World Championships in Rome, where she won gold on the balance beam, the first for a Japanese women's gymnast. This was the only World title won by a Japanese woman until 2017, when Mai Murakami won gold on the floor exercise. Ikeda was nicknamed the "Lover of Rome" at the competition.

As Japan was still in its post-war reconstruction, her accomplishment was seen as a sign of hope, and at Haneda Airport on her return, she was mobbed by the Japanese press. A great celebration was had in her hometown: a lantern procession procession was held in her honor, and in a traditional ceremony of good fortune, mochi were thrown to a crowd at her family home.

Ikeda made her Olympic debut at the 1956 Summer Olympics in Melbourne. There, she placed 13th in the all-around, 6th with the Japanese team, and 4th in the floor final. She also performed behind-the-scenes tasks for the Japanese delegation. She later reflected that at the time, emphasis was put on the team event, and individual results did not gain as much attention; she also recalled that ten years after the end of World War II, anti-Japanese sentiment still lingered in Australia.

She graduated in 1956 and remained at Nippon Sport Science University as an assistant. She taught classes during the daytime, instructed gymnastics in the evening, and did her own practice at night.

At the 1958 World Championships in Moscow, she won the bronze medal on floor. At the competition, most of the Japanese team suffered from food poisoning, and she was the only member unaffected.

=== 1958–1964: Marriage, children, and Tokyo Olympics ===
In 1958, she married Mutsuhiko Ikeda, a faculty member of Kokushikan University, and changed her family name. She married him on the condition that she would continue gymnastics. Ignoring criticism from those around her, she performed housework while also continuing her work at Nippon Sport Science University and her gymnastics training.

She competed at the 1960 Summer Olympics in Rome. She recalled that the environment was "dire", and the competition facilities were old enough that grit fell from the ceiling. She finished 6th in the all-around and 5th on both the uneven bars and the balance beam. The Japanese women's team finished 4th. As the next Olympics would take place in Tokyo, the Japan women's team was expected to medal there.

Ikeda had her first son in 1961. Four months after giving birth, she won her fifth consecutive national title at the All-Japan championships. This record was not broken until Kōko Tsurumi won a sixth straight title in 2011. The next year, at the 1962 World Championships in Prague, she won the bronze medal in the balance beam final. While expectations for the Japanese team at the Tokyo Olympics had grown even higher, Ikeda recalled being in shock when she returned home and found that her one-year-old son did not recognize her face.

In 1963, she had her second son. The Japan Gymnastics Association was angry that she had become pregnant only a year before the Tokyo Olympics, leading to a heated back-and-forth with Ikeda, who insisted she would both have a child and win a medal. She continued to practice until she was 7 months pregnant and returned to training a week after giving birth. There was no support system at the time for athlete mothers, and she took both sons to training camps to care for them. Her milk supply began to suffer, and a month before the Olympics, she seriously tore her left calf muscle.

Ikeda performing on the balance beam at the 1964 Summer Olympics

At the Olympics, the Japanese team was far behind the Soviets and Czechoslovakians, and they competed for third place with the United Team of Germany. Ikeda earned the team's highest score on the first apparatus, the balance beam, with a 9.70. After the German team made a series of mistakes, the Japanese team was able to win the bronze medal.

=== 1964–1968 ===
Though Ikeda was 31 at the Tokyo Olympics, afterward, she continued to be active as the team's leader. Her goal after the Olympics was to defeat Larisa Latynina.

At the 1966 World Championships in Dortmund, West Germany, she won bronze in the all-around and silver on the uneven bars. With better results than Latynina, she had achieved her goal. However, Ikeda remembered the competition more as a turning point; in the all-around, at 33, she stood on the podium with Věra Čáslavská, 24, and Natalia Kuchinskaya, 17. Athletes a generation younger than her were taking top placements, and Latynina told the press she had competed for the sake of her younger teammates. Other countries were cultivating younger talent from a young age, while Japan lacked such a training system and was still relying on Ikeda, prompting her to think about nurturing the next generation of gymnasts. This was Ikeda's last international competition.

The next year, she won her tenth all-around title at the All-Japan Championships, a record that still stands. Although she hoped to compete at the 1968 Summer Olympics, she was not selected. The 1968 All-Japan Championships, held after the Olympics, were her last competition.

== Post-gymnastics career and death ==
After the 1966 World Championships, Ikeda established her own gymnastics club, which focused on junior athletes but was open to a wide range of ages. Gymnasts who trained there included Olympics Satoko Okazaki and Sakiko Nozawa. In 1975, she established another school in Hiroshima. Ikeda was the director of the sports department and a professor emeritus at Nippon Sport Science University, and she served as vice president of the Japan Gymnastics Association. She also organized a number of national and international competitions for junior gymnasts.

In 2002, she became the first Japanese woman to be inducted into the International Gymnastics Hall of Fame. At the award ceremony, after Ágnes Keleti remarked that she still practiced handstands, Ikeda performed one on the stage after tying back her evening gown, to the amusement of the audience. That year, she also became an honorary citizen of her hometown of Mihara.

Ikeda died from brain cancer at a nursing home in Kawasaki, Kanagawa, on May 13, 2023, at the age of 89.
