= Gymnastics at the 2020 Summer Olympics – Women's floor =

Olympic gymnastics event

Women's floor at the Games of the XXXII Olympiad
- Olympic artistic gymnastics
- Venue: Ariake Gymnastics Centre
- Dates: 25 July 2021 (qualifying); 2 August 2021 (final)
- Competitors: 8 from 6 nations
- Winning score: 14.366 points

Medalists
1st place, gold medalist(s)		Jade Carey	United States
2nd place, silver medalist(s)		Vanessa Ferrari	Italy
3rd place, bronze medalist(s)		Mai Murakami	Japan
3rd place, bronze medalist(s)		Angelina Melnikova	ROC

The women's floor event at the 2020 Summer Olympics was held on 25 July and 2 August 2021 at the Ariake Gymnastics Centre. Approximately 85 gymnasts from 53 nations (of the 98 total gymnasts) competed on floor in the qualifying round.

Jade Carey won the competition, earning the United States' third consecutive title on floor. The title is Carey's first Olympic medal. Italy's Vanessa Ferrari earned silver to win her first Olympic medal, as well Italy's first individual Olympic medal in women's artistic gymnastics and second-ever medal overall. Mai Murakami of Japan and Angelina Melnikova of ROC tied for the bronze. It is Murakami's first Olympic medal and Melnikova's fourth. Like Ferrari, Murakami's medal is also the first individual Olympic medal for her country in women's artistic gymnastics and second-ever overall.

The medals for the competition were presented by Octavian Morariu, Romania; IOC Member, and the medalists' bouquets were presented by Farid Gayibov, Azerbaijan; FIG Executive Committee Member.

== Background ==
This was the 19th appearance of the event, after making its debut at the 1952 Summer Olympics. Defending champion Simone Biles of the United States was aiming to become the first woman to defend their title since Nellie Kim in 1976 and 1980. Representing Italy, Vanessa Ferrari has returned for her fourth Olympic Games, hoping to leave with a medal after coming shy of bronze in 2012 and 2016. Biles qualified in second place behind Ferrari after a relatively subpar performance by her standards. However, she announced her withdrawal on 31 July 2021 due to continued mental blocks, following earlier withdrawals from the team and individual all-around finals, as well as the first day of individual event finals.

== Qualification ==
A National Olympic Committee (NOC) could enter up to 6 qualified gymnasts: a team of 4 and up to 2 specialists. A total of 98 quota places are allocated to women's gymnastics.

The 12 teams that qualify will be able to send 4 gymnasts in the team competition, for a total of 48 of the 98 quota places. The top three teams at the 2018 World Artistic Gymnastics Championships (the United States, Russia, and China) and the top nine teams (excluding those already qualified) at the 2019 World Artistic Gymnastics Championships (France, Canada, the Netherlands, Great Britain, Italy, Germany, Belgium, Japan, and Spain) earned team qualification places. The US Women's Gymnastics Olympic Team consisted of returner Simone Biles, Jordan Chiles, Sunisa Lee and Grace McCullum; with individuals MyKayla Skinner and Jade Carey.

The remaining 50 quota places are awarded individually. Each gymnast can only earn one place, except that gymnasts that competed with a team that qualified are eligible to earn a second place through the 2020 All Around World Cup Series. Some of the individual events are open to gymnasts from NOCs with qualified teams, while others are not. These places are filled through various criteria based on the 2019 World Championships, the 2020 FIG Artistic Gymnastics World Cup series, continental championships, a host guarantee, and a Tripartite Commission invitation.

Each of the 98 qualified gymnasts are eligible for the floor competition, but many gymnasts do not compete in each of the apparatus events.

The COVID-19 pandemic delayed many of the events for qualifying for gymnastics. The 2018 and 2019 World Championships were completed on time, but many of the World Cup series events were delayed into 2021.

== Competition format ==
The top 8 qualifiers in the qualification phase (limit two per NOC) advanced to the apparatus final. The finalists performed on the floor again. Qualification scores were then ignored, with only final round scores counting.

== Schedule ==
The competition was held over two days, 25 July and 2 August. The qualifying round (for all women's gymnastics events) was the first day with the floor final on the third and final day of individual event finals.

Date	Time	Round	Subdivision
25 July	10:00	Qualification	Subdivision 1
25 July	11:50	Qualification	Subdivision 2
25 July	15:10	Qualification	Subdivision 3
25 July	17:05	Qualification	Subdivision 4
25 July	20:20	Qualification	Subdivision 5
2 August	17:57	Final	–
All times are local time (UTC+09:00).

== Results ==
=== Qualifying ===
Rank	Gymnast	D Score	E Score	Pen.	Total	Results
1	Vanessa Ferrari (ITA)	5.9	8.266		14.166	Q
2	Simone Biles (USA)	6.7	7.733	0.300	14.133	Q W
3	Jade Carey (USA)	6.2	7.900		14.100	Q
4	Rebeca Andrade (BRA)	5.7	8.366		14.066	Q
5	Jessica Gadirova (GBR)	5.5	8.533		14.033	Q
6	Viktoria Listunova (ROC)	5.6	8.400		14.000	Q
7	Angelina Melnikova (ROC)	5.8	8.200		14.000	Q
8	Mai Murakami (JPN)	5.8	8.133		13.933	Q
9	Jennifer Gadirova (GBR)	5.4	8.400		13.800	R1 S
10	Vladislava Urazova (ROC)	5.3	8.333		13.633	–
11	Lilia Akhaimova (ROC)	5.8	7.833		13.633	–
12	Nina Derwael (BEL)	5.0	8.566		13.566	R2
13	Jordan Chiles (USA)	5.9	7.666		13.566	–
14	MyKayla Skinner (USA)	6.0	7.566		13.566	–
15	Brooklyn Moors (CAN)	5.1	8.433		13.533	R3

Reserves

The reserves for the women's floor final were:

1. Jennifer Gadirova (GBR) – called up after Simone Biles' withdrawal
2. Nina Derwael (BEL)
3. Brooklyn Moors (CAN)

Only two gymnasts from each country may advance to the event final. No gymnasts were excluded from the final because of the quota, although ROC gymnasts Vladislava Urazova and Lilia Akhaimova, and American gymnasts Jordan Chiles and MyKayla Skinner were excluded as reserves due to the two-per-country rule.

=== Final ===
Rank	Gymnast	D Score	E Score	Pen.	Total
1st place, gold medalist(s)	Jade Carey (USA)	6.3	8.066		14.366
2nd place, silver medalist(s)	Vanessa Ferrari (ITA)	5.9	8.300		14.200
3rd place, bronze medalist(s)	Mai Murakami (JPN)	5.9	8.266		14.166
3rd place, bronze medalist(s)	Angelina Melnikova (ROC)	5.9	8.266		14.166
5	Rebeca Andrade (BRA)	5.9	8.233	0.100	14.033
6	Jessica Gadirova (GBR)	5.6	8.400		14.000
7	Jennifer Gadirova (GBR)	5.1	8.133		13.233
8	Viktoria Listunova (ROC)	5.2	7.300	0.100	12.400

Bronze medalists Mai Murakami and Angelina Melnikova had identical E-scores (8.266), and also identical D-scores (5.9), meaning that the tie was unbroken per FIG's standard tie-breaking procedures. Practically, this also means that both gymnasts would be awarded the same rank, which is very rare today, and this is the first time since 1996 to have a tie on the podium in men's and women's artistic gymnastics when current Olympic-tie-breaking rules took effect at the 2000 Sydney Games.

Jade Carey earned the US's third consecutive gold medal in the floor event for the past three Olympics. Vanessa Ferrari at the age of 30 finally got her Olympic medal on floor, after placing 4th at the 2012 and 2016 Olympics. She scored third highest in the floor final at the 2012 London Olympics, but the tie-breaking procedure worked against her to rank her fourth and out of the medals in the standings.
