= Miyuki Matsuhisa =

Japanese artistic gymnast

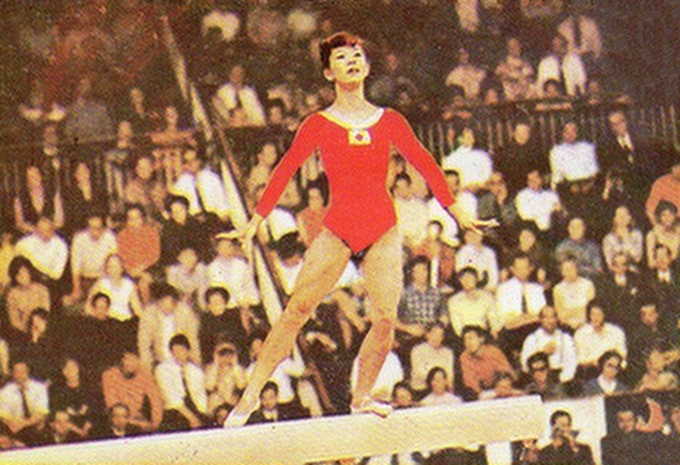

Personal information
- Born: August 15, 1945 (age 81) Kyoto, Japan
- Height: 150 cm (4 ft 11 in)
- Weight: 41 kg (90 lb)

Sport
- Sport: Artistic gymnastics

Miyuki Matsuhisa-Hironaka (松久-広中 ミユキ, born August 15, 1945) is a retired Japanese artistic gymnast who competed at the 1968, 1972 and 1976 Summer Olympics. She had her best results in 1968, when her team placed fourth and she shared ninth place on the balance beam.
