= Misa Nishiyama =

Japanese artistic gymnast (born 2010)

- 西山 実沙
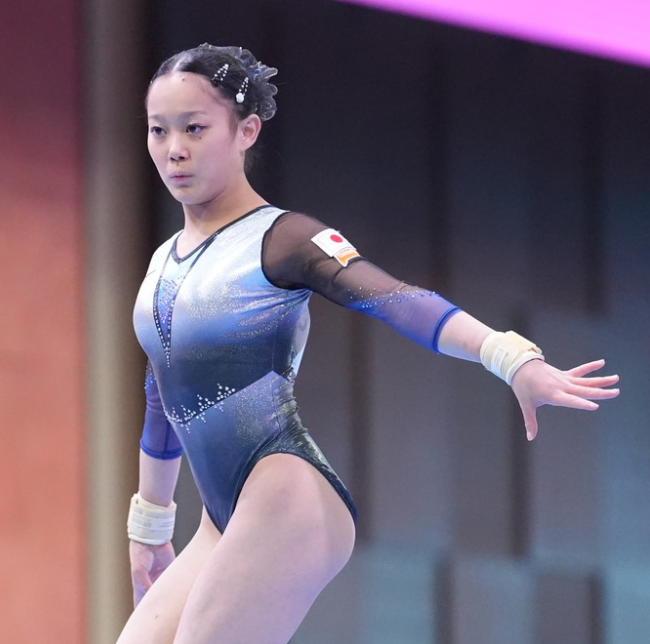
- Nishiyama at the 2025 Junior World Championships

Personal information
- Born: 7 September 2010 (age 16)

Gymnastics career
- Discipline: Women's artistic gymnastics
- Country represented: Japan
- Club: Namba Gymnastics
Medal record
Representing Japan
World Championships
Bronze medal – third place	2026 Rotterdam	Team
Asian Games
Silver medal – second place	2026 Aichi-Nagoya	Team
Silver medal – second place	2026 Aichi-Nagoya	Uneven bars
Silver medal – second place	2026 Aichi-Nagoya	Floor exercise
Bronze medal – third place	2026 Aichi-Nagoya	All-around
Asian Championships
Silver medal – second place	2026 Zunyi	Team
Bronze medal – third place	2026 Zunyi	All-around
Bronze medal – third place	2026 Zunyi	Uneven bars
Junior World Championships
Gold medal – first place	2025 Manila	Floor exercise
Silver medal – second place	2025 Manila	Team
Silver medal – second place	2025 Manila	Vault
Bronze medal – third place	2025 Manila	All-around

Misa Nishiyama (Japanese: 西山 実沙; born 7 September 2010) is a Japanese artistic gymnast. She was part of the bronze medal-winning team at the 2026 World Championships. She was also the 2025 Junior World floor exercise champion.

== Gymnastics career ==
Nishiyama made her international debut at the 2023 City of Jesolo Trophy. She advanced into the all-around final at the 2023 All-Japan Championships and placed 12th. She then finished 16th at the 2023 NHK Trophy. At the 2024 DTB Pokal Team Challenge, she won a silver medal in the junior team competition, and she placed seventh in the all-around. She also advanced into the uneven bars final, finishing fifth. She won a bronze medal on the balance beam at the 2024 All-Japan Event Championships, behind seniors Kaoruko Takezawa and Urara Ashikawa.

Nishiyama finished eighth in the all-around at the 2025 All-Japan Championships. She then finished sixth all-around at the 2025 NHK Trophy. At the 2025 All-Japan Junior Championships, she won the all-around silver medal, behind Haruka Nakamura.

In November 2025, Nishiyama competed at the 2025 Junior World Championships. She helped the Japanese team win a silver medal with a score of 107.930, finishing behind France, and she advanced into the all-around final in second place. Individually, she won a gold medal on floor exercise with a score of 13.533, and a silver medal on the vault with a score of 13.633, finishing behind team USA's Lavi Crain. In the all-around final, she won a bronze medal with a score of 53.066, finishing behind teammate Yume Minamino and France's Elena Colas.

In June 2026, she competed at the 2026 Asian Women's Artistic Gymnastics Championships where she helped the Japanese team win a silver medal, finishing behind China. Individually, she won bronze in the all-around and on uneven bars. In October 2026, she competed at the 2026 World Artistic Gymnastics Championships, and won a bronze medal in the team event. This was the first medal for Japan's women's team at the Artistic Gymnastics World Championships since 1966.

== Competitive history ==
Competitive history of Misa Nishiyama at the junior level
Year	Event	Team	AA	VT	UB	BB	FX
2023	City of Jesolo Trophy						
2023	All-Japan Championships		14				
2023	NHK Trophy		16				
2023	All-Japan Event Championships					12	
2023	All-Japan Junior Championships						
2023	All-Japan Team Championships	5	9				
2024	DTB Pokal Team Challenge	2nd place, silver medalist(s)	7		5		
2024	All-Japan Championships						
2024	All-Japan Junior Championships		11				
2024	All-Japan Team Championships	1st place, gold medalist(s)					
2024	All-Japan Event Championships					3rd place, bronze medalist(s)	6
2025	All-Japan Championships		8				
2025	NHK Trophy		6				
2025	All-Japan Junior Championships		2nd place, silver medalist(s)				
2025	Japanese National Sports Festival		3rd place, bronze medalist(s)	1st place, gold medalist(s)		2nd place, silver medalist(s)	3rd place, bronze medalist(s)
2025	All-Japan Team and Event Championships	1st place, gold medalist(s)			4		
2025	Junior World Championships	2nd place, silver medalist(s)	3rd place, bronze medalist(s)	2nd place, silver medalist(s)		4	1st place, gold medalist(s)

Competitive history of Misa Nishiyama at the senior level
Year	Event	Team	AA	VT	UB	BB	FX
2026	International Gymnix	2nd place, silver medalist(s)	3rd place, bronze medalist(s)		1st place, gold medalist(s)	1st place, gold medalist(s)	4
2026	All-Japan Championships		1st place, gold medalist(s)	1st place, gold medalist(s)	1st place, gold medalist(s)		
2026	NHK Trophy		1st place, gold medalist(s)	2nd place, silver medalist(s)	1st place, gold medalist(s)		
2026	Asian Championships	2nd place, silver medalist(s)	3rd place, bronze medalist(s)		3rd place, bronze medalist(s)	4	
2026	All-Japan Junior Championships		1st place, gold medalist(s)	1st place, gold medalist(s)	1st place, gold medalist(s)	3rd place, bronze medalist(s)	
2026	Japanese National Sports Festival		1st place, gold medalist(s)	1st place, gold medalist(s)	1st place, gold medalist(s)		
2026	Asian Games	2nd place, silver medalist(s)	3rd place, bronze medalist(s)		2nd place, silver medalist(s)		2nd place, silver medalist(s)
2026	World Championships	3rd place, bronze medalist(s)					
