= Eiko Hirashima =

Japanese gymnast

Personal information
- Nationality: Japanese
- Born: 7 October 1950 (age 76)
- Spouse: Eizo Kenmotsu

Sport
- Sport: Gymnastics

Eiko Hirashima (平島栄子, Hirashima Eiko; born 7 October 1950) is a Japanese gymnast. She was the Japanese national champion in 1972, and competed at the 1972 Summer Olympics in Munich.

Hirashima was coach of Japan's women's gymnastics team on their 1975 tour in Europe, after she married fellow gymnast Eizo Kenmotsu.
