= Mari Kosuge =

Japanese artistic gymnast

Personal information
- Nationality: Japanese
- Born: 16 October 1975 (age 50) Tokyo, Japan

Sport
- Sport: Artistic gymnastics
Medal record
Representing Japan
Asian Games
Silver medal – second place	1994 Hiroshima	Team
Silver medal – second place	1990 Beijing	Floor exercise

Mari Kosuge (小菅麻里, Kosuge Mari; (born 16 October 1975) is a Japanese artistic gymnast. She placed 17th in the individual all-around at the 1992 Summer Olympics. At the 1994 Asian Games in Hiroshima, she won silver with her team.

== Competition history ==
Year	Event	Team	AA	VT	UB	BB	FX
Junior
1987	Chunichi Cup		11	8		4	
1987	International Junior Championships		8				
1987	Japanese Championships		13				
1988	Japanese Championships		1st place, gold medalist(s)	1st place, gold medalist(s)	1st place, gold medalist(s)	1st place, gold medalist(s)	2nd place, silver medalist(s)
1988	Pacific Alliance Championships		8				
1988	NHK Cup		5				
Senior
1989	McDonald's American Cup		5				
1989	Asia Youth Cup		2nd place, silver medalist(s)	1st place, gold medalist(s)		1st place, gold medalist(s)	
1989	Chunichi Cup		6				
1989	International Junior Championships		8	3rd place, bronze medalist(s)	3rd place, bronze medalist(s)		4
1989	International Mixed Pairs	12					
1989	Japanese Championships		1st place, gold medalist(s)		1st place, gold medalist(s)		1st place, gold medalist(s)
1989	NHK Cup		2nd place, silver medalist(s)				
1989	Tokyo Cup			5			2nd place, silver medalist(s)
1989	World Sports Fair		3rd place, bronze medalist(s)				2nd place, silver medalist(s)
1990	McDonald's American Cup		3rd place, bronze medalist(s)				
1990	Asian Games		5				2nd place, silver medalist(s)
1990	China Cup		5				
1990	Chunichi Cup		11				
1990	Goodwill Games		8	5	6	8	8
1990	International Mixed Pairs	7					
1990	Japanese Championships		1st place, gold medalist(s)	2nd place, silver medalist(s)	3rd place, bronze medalist(s)	1st place, gold medalist(s)	1st place, gold medalist(s)
1990	NHK Cup		1st place, gold medalist(s)				
1990	Tokyo Cup					6	2nd place, silver medalist(s)
1990	World Cup Final		14				
1990	World Stars		3rd place, bronze medalist(s)			8	3rd place, bronze medalist(s)
1991	Blume Memorial		17	4			7
1991	China Cup		3rd place, bronze medalist(s)	2nd place, silver medalist(s)	5	8	8
1991	Chunichi Cup		15				
1991	International Junior Championships		1st place, gold medalist(s)	1st place, gold medalist(s)	2nd place, silver medalist(s)	2nd place, silver medalist(s)	2nd place, silver medalist(s)
1991	Japanese Championships		1st place, gold medalist(s)				
1991	NHK Cup		1st place, gold medalist(s)				
1991	Tokyo Cup			3rd place, bronze medalist(s)		3rd place, bronze medalist(s)	
1991	World Championships		12				
1991	World Sports Fair		8	1st place, gold medalist(s)		7	1st place, gold medalist(s)
1992	McDonald's American Cup		4				
1992	International Mixed Pairs	7					
1992	Japanese Championships		1st place, gold medalist(s)	1st place, gold medalist(s)	3rd place, bronze medalist(s)		1st place, gold medalist(s)
1992	JPN-USA Dual Meet		1st place, gold medalist(s)				
1992	Olympic Games		17				
1993	McDonald's American Cup		7				
1993	International Mixed Pairs	11					
1993	Japanese Championships		2nd place, silver medalist(s)				
1993	JPN-USA Dual Meet	2nd place, silver medalist(s)	1st place, gold medalist(s)				
1993	NHK Cup		1st place, gold medalist(s)				
1993	World Championships		20				
1994
1994	Asian Games	2nd place, silver medalist(s)	6		5		4
1994	Japanese Championships				7	3rd place, bronze medalist(s)	
1994	NHK World Cup		3rd place, bronze medalist(s)				
1994	World Championships		24				
1995	McDonald's American Cup		10				
1995	International Mixed Pairs	4					
1995	NHK Cup		1st place, gold medalist(s)				
1995	World Championships	10					
