= Nippon Sport Science University =

Private university in Japan

- 日本体育大学
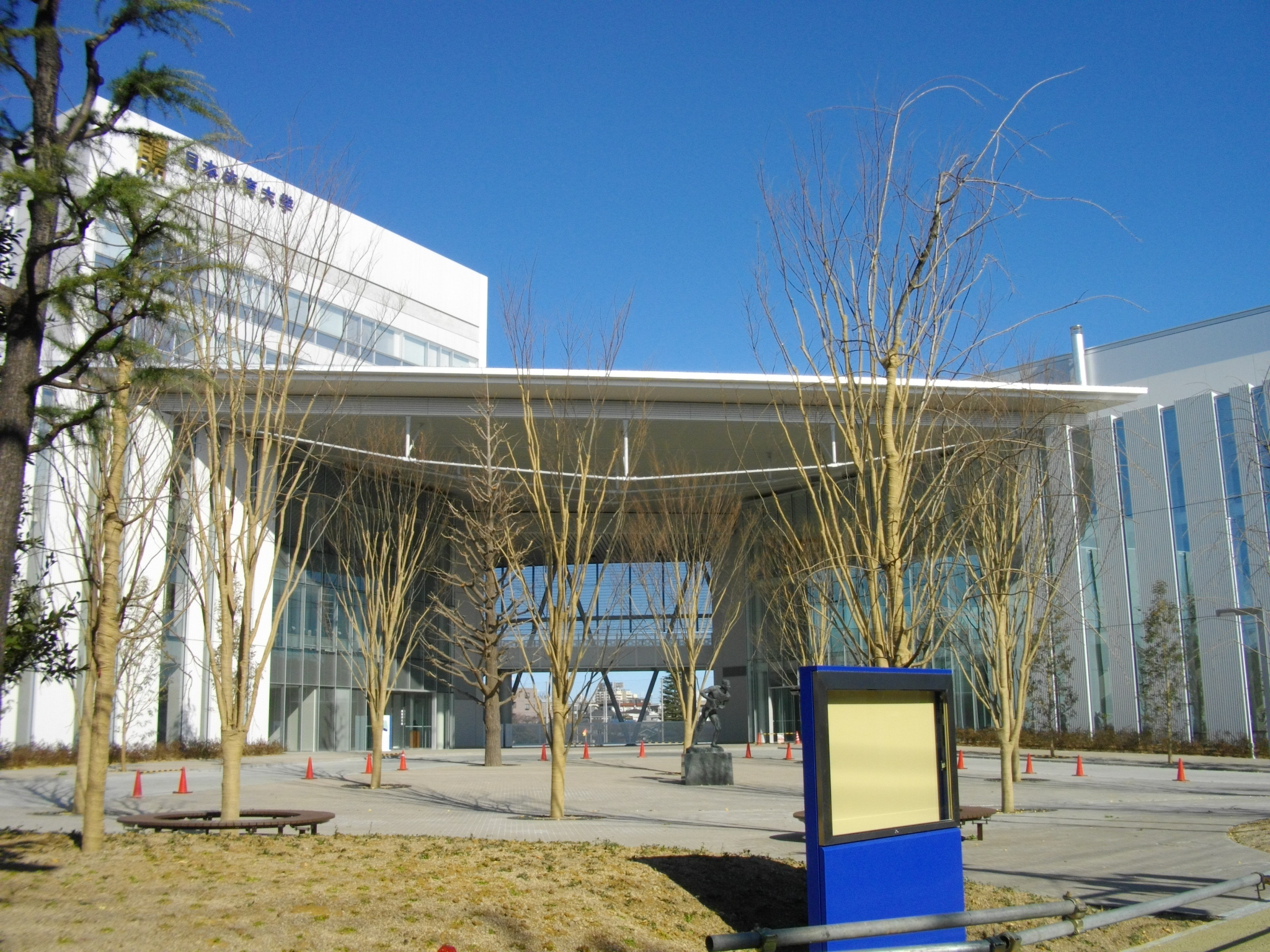
- Nippon Sport Science University
- Former name: Nippon College of Physical Education
- Motto: 體育富強之基
- Motto in English: Rich and Powerful Lives Based on Physical Education
- Type: Private
- Established: 1893
- Location: Setagaya, Yokohama, Tokyo and Kanagawa, Japan; 35°37′19″N 139°38′56″E
- Campus: Urban
- Nickname: Nittaidai
- Website: nittai.ac.jp

Nippon Sport Science University (日本体育大学, Nippon taiiku daigaku), abbreviated as Nittaidai (日体大), is a private university in Setagaya, Tokyo and Aoba-ku, Yokohama. The precursor of the school was founded in 1893, and it was chartered as a university in 1949. The school is known for the many famous athletes among its alumni.

== Organization ==
=== Schools and Faculties ===
- Faculty of Sport Science
  - Department of Physical Education
  - Department of Health Science
  - Department of Martial Arts
  - Department of Lifelong Sports and Recreation
- School of Childhood Sport Education
  - Department of Childhood Sport Education
- Faculty of Medical Science
  - Department of Judo Therapy and Medical Science
  - Department of Emergency Medical Science.

=== Graduate Schools ===
- Master's and Doctoral Degree Programs, Graduate School of Health and Sport Science

=== Research Centers ===
- Comprehensive Sport Science Research Center

The Comprehensive Sport Science Research Center publishes the open access journal, "NSSU Journal of Sport Sciences".

- Research Institute for Sport Science: RISS
- Sports Training Center

=== University Library ===
The library of the Setagaya campus holds some 380,000 books.

=== Other Organizations ===
- Office of Athletics
- Student Support Center
- Admission Center
- Health Care Center
- Student Dormitory

== Notable alumni ==
=== Athletes ===
- Nobuyuki Aihara - Gymnast; Olympic gold medalist
- Yutaka Aihara - Gymnast; Olympic bronze medalist
- Toshiko Shirasu-Aihara - Gymnast; Olympic bronze medalist
- Yuko Arimori - Marathon runner; Olympic silver medalist
- Chiyotairyū - Professional sumo wrestler
- Kōji Gushiken - Gymnast; Olympic gold medalist
- Rei Higuchi - Wrestler; Olympic gold medalist
- Hokutōfuji - Professional sumo wrestler
- Keiko Tanaka-Ikeda - Gymnast; Olympic gold medalist
- Yukio Iketani - Gymnast; Olympic silver medalist
- Kakizoe - Professional sumo wrestler
- Nahomi Kawasumi - Football player; Olympic silver medalist
- Eizo Kenmotsu - Gymnast; Olympic gold, silver and bronze medalist
- Kosuke Kitajima - Swimmer; Olympic gold medalist
- Mako Kobata - Volleyball player; a part of 2020 Summer Olympics women's tournament
- Toshihiko Koga - Retired judoka; Olympic gold medalist
- Karina Maruyama - Football player; Olympic silver medalist
- Kentaro Minagawa - Alpine skier
- Sota Miura - Football/soccer player
- Daisuke Miyazaki - Handball player
- Shinji Morisue - Gymnast; Olympic gold medalist
- Jungo Morita - Volleyball player; Olympic gold medalist
- Mari Motohashi - Curler
- Myōgiryū - Professional sumo wrestler
- Katsuhiko Nagata - Amateur wrestler; Olympic silver medalist
- Boniface Nduka - Football/soccer player
- Ōnosato - Professional sumo wrestler
- Chieko Sugawara - Fencer
- Ran Takahashi – Volleyball player; a part of 2020 Summer Olympics men's tournament
- Kenta Takanashi – Volleyball player; a part of 2020 Summer Olympics men's tournament
- Juri Takayama - Softball player; Olympic silver medalist
- Konosuke Takeshita - Professional wrestler
- Rie Tanaka - Gymnast
- Yota Tsuji - Professional wrestler
- Mitsuo Tsukahara - Gymnast; Olympic gold medalist
- Yuki Tsunoda - Formula 1 driver
- Kōhei Uchimura - Active gymnast; Olympic gold and silver medalist
- Yayoi Urano - Amateur wrestler; 6-time world champion
- Hiroshi Yamamoto - Archer; Olympic silver medalist
- Kōji Yamamuro - Gymnast; Olympic silver medalist
- Haruhiro Yamashita - Gymnast; Olympic gold medalist
- Tomohiro Yamamoto – Volleyball player; a part of 2020 Summer Olympics men's tournament
- Toshiki Yamamoto - Weightlifter
- Yoshikaze - Professional sumo wrestler

=== Politicians ===
- Ryoko Tani - Retired judoka; Olympic gold medalist
- Kazuyuki Nakane - Member of the House of Representatives in the Diet of Japan.
- Kenshiro Matsunami - Member of the House of Representatives in the Diet of Japan.

=== Entertainers ===
- Sonny Chiba - Actor; Martial artist
- Keita Machida - Actor
- Mandy Sekiguchi - Dancer

== Current notable students ==
=== Athletes ===
- Uta Abe - Active Judoka; 2020 Olympic gold medalist and four-times world champion of -52 kg category.
- Hifumi Abe - Active Judoka; 2020 and 2024 Olympic gold medalist and four-times world champion of -66 kg category.
- Kenzō Shirai - Active gymnast; 2016 Olympic gold and bronze medalist
- Ran Takahashi - Active Volleyball Player; part of Japan's national team competing in the 2020 Tokyo Olympics volleyball men's tournament
- Daiki Kajiwara - Active para badminton Player; 2020 Paralympic gold medalist of men's singles WH2 and bronze medalist of men's doubles WH1–WH2
