= Hiroko Tsuji =

Japanese artistic gymnast

- Born: November 29, 1938 (age 87) Kanazawa, Ishikawa Prefecture, Japan
- Height: 1.51 m (4 ft 11 in)

Gymnastics career
- Discipline: Women's artistic gymnastics
Medal record
Representing Japan
Olympic Games
Bronze medal – third place	1964 Tokyo	Team
World Championships
Bronze medal – third place	1962 Prague	Team

Hiroko Kato, née Tsuji (辻 宏子, Tsuji Hiroko; born November 29, 1938) is a retired Japanese artistic gymnast. She competed in all artistic gymnastics events at the 1964 Olympics and won a team bronze medal, and she also won a team bronze medal at the 1962 World Championships as part of the first Japanese women's team to do so.

== Early and personal life ==
Tsuji was born in Kanazawa. As a child, in her physical education classes at school, she struggled to clear the vaulting boxes used before fourth grade, when a teacher helped her learn how to do so. She cited this experience as leading her to realize "with hard work, I can do it". In middle school, she joined the dance club.

She married fellow gymnast Takeshi Katō.

== Career ==
Tsuji discovered she had a talent for gymnastics in middle school and, to the opposition of her family, chose a high school that focused on its gymnastics team. In high school, she won the national Inter-High School Championships for two consecutive years. Her high school initially lacked the necessary equipment for training women. It did not have a long enough balance beam, so she asked a carpenter to extend it. A schoolmate's father modified a pair of men's parallel bars the school received from a university to serve as their uneven bars, and a hole had to be cut into the ceiling so Tsuji could perform handstands on it. Her coach was a former competitive diver and used ropes to allow Tsuji and her classmates to repeat movements midair.

She failed to qualify for either the 1956 Summer Olympics or the 1960 Summer Olympics. Tsuji felt she was not chosen for the 1956 team due to being a young gymnast from a more rural area, and she injured her achilles tendon prior to the 1960 selection event. She decided that she would make the 1964 Summer Olympics, which would be held in Tokyo, her last attempt to be selected. She stayed in her hometown of Kanazawa rather than moving to Tokyo like most national team members, despite the trip for training camps taking 8 hours at the time.

At the 1962 World Championships, she and her teammates won the bronze medal in the team event, which was the first time a Japanese women's team reached the podium. In 1963, she ruptured her other achilles tendon.

She recovered in time to finish fifth at the team selection event for the 1964 Olympics. Afterward, however, with great pressure on the team to improve on its fourth-place finish from the 1960 Olympics and win a medal, they trained many hours, which Tsuji later said was "overdoing it", and so she did not compete at the Olympics in her best condition.

At the Olympics, she won bronze in the team event with her teammates. Her best individual achievement was 23rd place on the vault. At the time, the team was given only a single medal, but in 2006, she received a replica for herself.

== Post-competitive career ==
Tsuji attended Kanazawa University, as her family could not afford for her to attend a university in Tokyo. After she retired from competition, she taught at Shohoku College. She also became an international judge and judged at the 1988 Summer Olympics. In 2012, she was leading gymnastics classes for the elderly.
