= Mitsuko Kandori =

Japanese gymnast

Personal information
- Nationality: Japanese
- Born: 5 May 1943 (age 81); Tokyo, Japan

Sport
- Sport: Gymnastics

Mitsuko Kandori (Japanese:香取光子; born 5 May 1943) is a Japanese gymnast. She competed in six events at the 1968 Summer Olympics.
