= Toshiko Shirasu-Aihara =

Japanese artistic gymnast

Toshiko Aihara
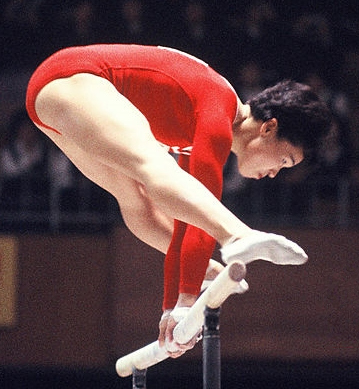
- Aihara at the 1964 Summer Olympics

Personal information
- Born: June 3, 1939 (age 87) Mihara, Hiroshima, Japan
- Height: 1.47 m (4 ft 10 in)

Gymnastics career
- Discipline: Women's artistic gymnastics
Medal record
Representing Japan
Olympic Games
Bronze medal – third place	1964 Tokyo	Team
World Championships
Bronze medal – third place	1962 Prague	Team

Toshiko Aihara, née Shirasu (相原 俊子, Aihara Toshiko; born June 3, 1939) is a retired Japanese artistic gymnast. She competed at the 1960 and 1964 Olympics and won a team bronze medal in 1964. She also won a team bronze medal at the 1962 World Championships as part of the first Japanese women's team to win a World medal.

== Career ==
Aihara competed at the 1960 Summer Olympics in Rome. There, the Japanese team placed 4th. Individually, Aihara placed 24th in the all-around.

In 1962, she won the inaugural NHK Trophy. At the World Championships, she and her teammates won the bronze medal in the team event, which was the first time a Japanese women's team reached the podium.

The 1964 Summer Olympics were held in Tokyo. In the run-up, Aihara was hospitalized three times due to herniated discs in her back; a doctor warned her she might not be able to have children if she continued training. However, she placed second at the trails for the team. At the Olympics, she had pain-killing injections done, and she said that once she began performing, she forgot about the pain. Together, the Japanese team won bronze, and Aihara placed 4th in the vault final, missing a tie for second place by 0.001 points. She also placed 4th in the uneven bars final.

At the time, gymnastics teams were awarded a single medal. In 2006, she and other gymnasts received a commemorative individualized symbol of recognition for their team placements. After seeing the medal for the first time in 2019, at an event commemorating the 100th anniversary of gymnast Masao Takemoto, she asked if the team members could be given individual members, though her request was refused based on the rules at the time.

== Post-competitive career ==
Aihara and her husband opened a gymnastics club in Takasaki for both men's and women's gymnastics.

== Personal life ==
Aihara was born in Mihara, Hiroshima. She married Nobuyuki Aihara, a fellow Olympic gymnast, in 1963. The couple hoped to compete at the 1964 Olympics together; however, Nobuyuki did not make the team. A picture of Toshiko crying was published in newspapers, and afterward, she largely avoided the press. Their son, Yutaka Aihara, won a bronze medal in gymnastics at the 1992 Olympics.

She attended Nippon Sport Science University.
