= Kana Yamawaki =

Japanese artistic gymnast

Personal information
- Nationality: Japanese
- Born: 1 September 1984 (age 40); Gifu, Japan

Sport
- Sport: Gymnastics

Kana Yamawaki (山脇 佳奈, Yamawaki Kana, born 1 September 1984) is a Japanese gymnast. She competed at the 2000 Summer Olympics.
