= Taki Shibuya =

Japanese artistic gymnast

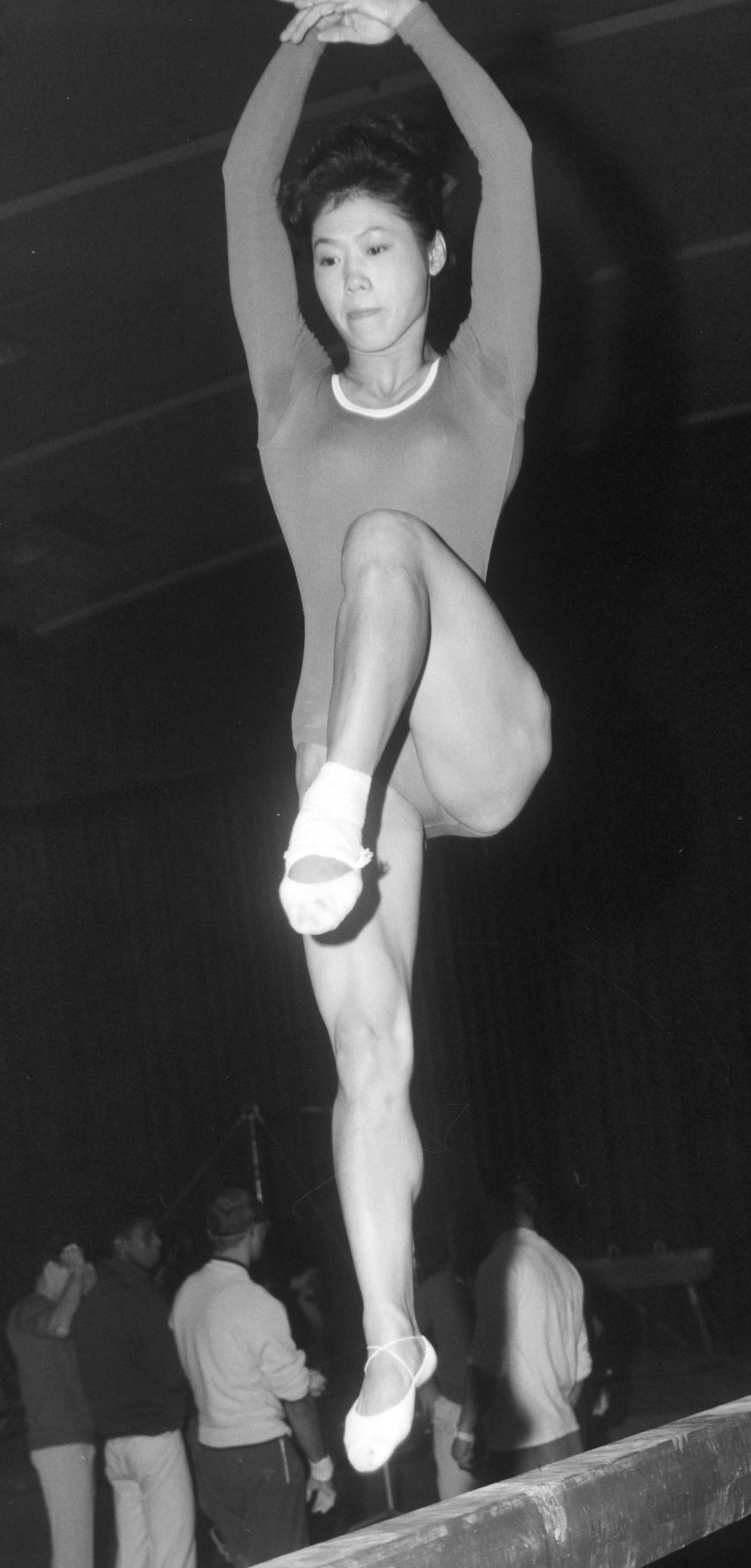
- Shibuya in 1966

Gymnastics career
Medal record
Representing Japan
World Championships
Bronze medal – third place	1966 Dortmund	Team

Taki Shibuya (渋谷多喜, Shibuya Taki) is a retired artistic gymnast from Japan. She was part of the Japanese team that won the bronze medal at the 1966 World Artistic Gymnastics Championships. Nationally, she won three consecutive NHK Cup competitions in 1965–1967.
