= Kiyoko Ono =

Japanese politician and gymnast (1936–2021)

- 小野 清子
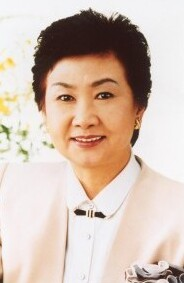

Chairwoman of the National Public Safety Commission
- In office 22 September 2003 – 27 September 2004
- Prime Minister: Junichiro Koizumi
- Preceded by: Sadakazu Tanigaki
- Succeeded by: Yoshitaka Murata

Member of the House of Councillors
- In office 29 July 2001 – 28 July 2007
- Constituency: National PR
- In office 8 July 1986 – 25 July 1998
- Preceded by: Ken Yasui
- Succeeded by: Toshio Ogawa
- Constituency: Tokyo at-large

Personal details
- Born: 4 February 1936 Iwanuma, Miyagi, Japan
- Died: 13 March 2021 (aged 85) Tokyo, Japan
- Party: Liberal Democratic
- Education: Tokyo University of Education
- Height: 1.57 m (5 ft 2 in)

Gymnastics career
- Discipline: Women's artistic gymnastics
- Country represented: Japan
Medal record
Representing Japan
Olympic Games
Bronze medal – third place	1964 Tokyo	Team
World Championships
Bronze medal – third place	1962 Prague	Team

Kiyoko Ono (小野 清子, Ono Kiyoko; 4 February 1936 – 13 March 2021) was a Japanese politician and gymnast. She competed at the 1960 and 1964 Olympics and won a team bronze medal in 1964.

== Early life ==
Ono was born on 4 February 1936. Her father died when she was three months old. In 1958, she graduated from the Tokyo University of Education and married Takashi Ono, a fellow Olympic gymnast. They have two sons and three daughters; the first two children were born between 1961 and 1963 while both parents were actively competing.

== Athletic career ==
Ono represented Japan in gymnastics at the 1960 Olympic Games in Rome and in the 1964 Olympic Games in Tokyo. During the latter competition, the team won the bronze, the only Olympic medal that the Japanese women's gymnastics team had won.

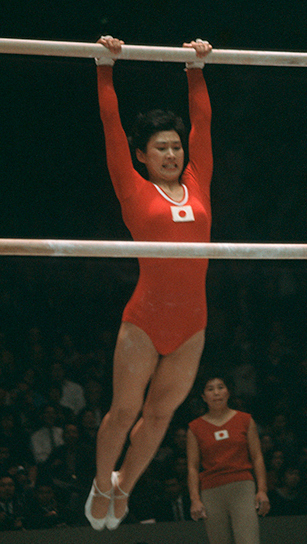
Kiyoko Ono in the 1964 Olympics

== Political career ==
Ono won the 1986 election and became a member of the House of Councillors for the Liberal Democratic Party between 1986 and 2007. She was a member of the committee on social and labour affairs and the committee on the budget. In 2003, she headed the National Safety Commission, the first woman to hold the position.

Ono was affiliated with the openly revisionist organization Nippon Kaigi.

== Later life and death ==
Ono became the first female vice president of the Japanese Olympic Committee and director of the Japan Sport Council. She worked to create the country's Toto soccer lottery. She was awarded an Olympic Order award from the International Olympic Committee in 2016.

On 13 March 2021, Ono died suddenly of complications from COVID-19 at the age of 85 while she was hospitalized for a bone fracture.
