= Sakiko Nozawa =

Japanese gymnast

Personal information
- Nationality: Japanese
- Born: 12 July 1961 (age 65)

Sport
- Sport: Gymnastics

Sakiko Nozawa (野沢 咲子, Nozawa Sakiko; born 12 July 1961) is a Japanese gymnast. She competed in six events at the 1976 Summer Olympics.
