= Taniko Nakamura-Mitsukuri =

Japanese artistic gymnast

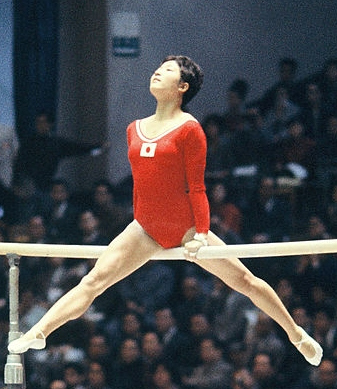
- Nakamura at the 1964 Olympics

Personal information
- Born: March 23, 1943 (age 83) Sanjō, Niigata, Japan
- Height: 1.58 m (5 ft 2 in)

Gymnastics career
- Discipline: Women's artistic gymnastics
Medal record
Representing Japan
Olympic Games
Bronze medal – third place	1964 Tokyo	Team
World Championships
Bronze medal – third place	1962 Prague	Team
Bronze medal – third place	1966 Dortmund	Team
Bronze medal – third place	1966 Dortmund	Uneven Bars

Taniko Mitsukuri, née Nakamura, (中村 多仁子; born March 23, 1943) is a retired Japanese artistic gymnast. She competed in all artistic gymnastics events at the 1964 Olympics, where she won a team bronze medal, and at the 1968 Olympics. She also won three bronze medals at the World Championships. She later became a professor at Tokai University.

== Early life ==
Nakamura was born in Sanjō, Niigata. She has three sisters, two older and one younger. She enrolled in the University of Tsukuba in 1961.

== Career ==
Nakamura participated in track and field and played volleyball in junior high school. As a teenager, she thought she would attend an all-girls' school, enter the workforce, and marry. However, she was advised to attend a co-educational sports specialization high school for students intending to go on to university. There, she began gymnastics in her second year when the school started a team for girls. Nakamura was subject to negative comments from those who did not think girls should participate in sports.

She specialized in the uneven bars, as her coach told her that Japanese women were lacking on that apparatus, so she could attend the Olympics if she became skilled on them. She primarily learned from footage her coach showed her. During her third year of high school, she placed third at the Japanese Inter-High School Championships.

At the 1962 World Championships, she and her teammates won the bronze medal in the team event, which was the first time a Japanese women's team reached the podium.

Two years later, Nakamura was selected for the 1964 Summer Olympics, held in her home country of Japan. The team spent the night before the compulsory event revising their uneven bar routines. While the team had hoped to finish third after the compulsory events, where they excelled, they finished that competition segment in fourth place. In the optional events, Nakamura improved her scores, and the team as a whole moved up to third to win the bronze medal.

Afterward, Nakamura married. She began working as a university instructor and had her first child, a son; she resumed training a month after giving birth. At the 1966 World Championships, she and her teammates again won bronze in the team event. Individually, she qualified for the uneven bars final, where she won another bronze.

In 1968, she was selected for the 1968 Olympic team, where she had her best individual achievement at the Olympics, a seventh place on uneven bars. In the team event, she and her teammates finished fourth.

== Post-competitive career ==
Nakamura became an assistant professor at Tokai University when it established its school of physical education. She founded the school's women's gymnastics team.

She was born with easily dislocated hips and underwent hip replacement surgery at age 67. In 2020, she moved to Yokohama and began ballroom dancing after being inspired by seeing an older woman dance.
