= Mai Murakami =

Japanese artistic gymnast (born 1996)

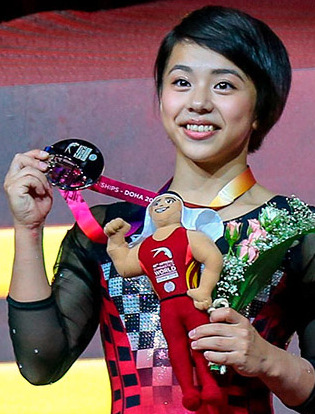
- Murakami at the 2018 World Championships

Personal information
- Born: 5 August 1996 (age 30) Sagamihara, Kanagawa, Japan
- Height: 1.48 m (4 ft 10 in)

Gymnastics career
- Discipline: Women's artistic gymnastics
- Country represented: Japan; (2010–2021)
- College team: Nippon Sport Science University
- Club: Yukio Iketani Gymnastics Club
- Head coach: Kazukuni Ohno
- Retired: 24 October 2021
Medal record
Women's artistic gymnastics
Representing Japan
Olympic Games
Bronze medal – third place	2020 Tokyo	Floor exercise
World Championships
Gold medal – first place	2017 Montreal	Floor exercise
Gold medal – first place	2021 Kitakyushu	Floor exercise
Silver medal – second place	2018 Doha	All-around
Bronze medal – third place	2018 Doha	Floor exercise
Bronze medal – third place	2021 Kitakyushu	Balance beam
FIG World Cup
Event / 1st / 2nd / 3rd; All-Around World Cup / 1 / 1 / 1

Mai Murakami (村上茉愛, Murakami Mai; born 5 August 1996) is a retired Japanese artistic gymnast and Olympic medalist. She won a gold medal on the floor exercise at the 2017 World Championships, becoming the first Japanese female gymnast to win a world title in 63 years. She also won the floor exercise title at the 2021 World Championships and won the all-around silver medal at the 2018 World Championships. She represented Japan at the 2016 and 2020 Olympics, winning a bronze medal on the floor exercise in the latter. This made her the first Japanese female gymnast to win an individual Olympic medal.

== Gymnastics career ==
Murakami joined Yukio Iketani's gymnastics club during elementary school. In 2010, she won the all-around, balance beam, and floor exercise titles at the National Junior High School Championships. She also won the floor exercise title at the senior-level All-Japan Championships and was added to the national team for the first time. She missed most of the 2011 season due to a knee injury.

=== 2012–2013 ===
Murakami competed at the 2012 All-Japan Championships, where she placed 11th in the all-around but won the floor exercise title. She was not named to the 2012 Olympic team. Murakami competed at the 2012 Stuttgart World Cup where Japan finished second to Russia.

Murakami competed at the 2013 City of Jesolo Trophy, where she won bronze with the Japanese team and placed 22nd in the all-around. She finished third in the all-around at the All-Japan Championships, behind Natsumi Sasada and Yu Minobe. She then finished fourth on the floor exercise at the 2013 World Championships.

=== 2014–2015 ===
Murakami competed at the 2014 Pacific Rim Championships, placing fourth with the team, sixth on the floor exercise, seventh on the uneven bars and balance beam, and ninth in the all-around. She then placed sixth in the all-around at the All-Japan Championships and fourth at the NHK Cup. She secured a berth for the 2014 World Championships team by winning the floor exercise title at the All-Japan Event Championships. At the World Championships, she helped Japan advance into the team final and finish eighth. After the World Championships, she finished the season by placing fifth in the all-around at the Glasgow World Cup and then winning the vault and floor exercise events at the Toyota International.

At the 2015 All-Japan Championships, Murakami placed tenth in the all-around, and she placed eighth in the all-around at the NHK Cup. Due to these results, she was initially named as the second alternate for the 2015 World Championships team, who subsequently replaced an injured Yuki Uchiyama with Murakami and placed fifth in the team final. Murakami's sixth-placed finish in the all-around was the best result by a Japanese woman since 2009.

=== 2016–2017 ===
Murakami began the 2016 Olympic season at the American Cup, where she placed sixth in the all-around. She then won her first all-around title at the All-Japan Championships. Then at the NHK Cup, she finished second in the all-around behind Asuka Teramoto. She was then named to represent Japan at the 2016 Summer Olympics along with Teramoto, Aiko Sugihara, Yuki Uchiyama, and Sae Miyakawa. The team finished fourth in the team final. Individually, Murakami placed 14th in the all-around final and seventh in the floor exercise final.

Murakami won her second consecutive All-Japan all-around title in 2017. She also won the all-around at the NHK Cup and was then automatically named to the World Championship team along with Aiko Sugihara. She then won silver on the floor exercise and placed fifth on vault at the All-Japan Event Championships. At the World Championships in Montreal, Quebec, Canada, she qualified first into the all-around final. However, she fell off the balance beam in the final and placed fourth, one-tenth of a point behind the bronze medalist, Russia's Elena Eremina. She bounced back in the floor exercise finals, where she placed first ahead of Jade Carey and Claudia Fragapane. She is Japan's first World gold medalist on this event, and Japan's second World gold medalist on any women's gymnastics event, after Keiko Tanaka-Ikeda won the gold on the balance beam in 1954. Afterward, she won gold on floor and bronze on vault at the Toyota International.

=== 2018–2019 ===
Murakami finished second in the all-around at the 2018 American Cup, behind Morgan Hurd. She then won the all-around at the Tokyo World Cup. She also won the all-around at both the All-Japan Championships and the NHK Cup. At the All-Japan Event Championships, she won gold on the balance beam and floor exercise. At the 2018 World Championships in Doha, Qatar, the Japanese team finished in sixth place. Individually, she won the silver medal in the all-around final, behind Simone Biles. It was the first women's all-around silver medal in Japan's history. She then won the bronze medal in the floor exercise final, behind Biles and Hurd.

Murakami won a bronze medal in the all-around at the 2019 American Cup behind Americans Leanne Wong and Grace McCallum. Murakami missed the NHK Cup due to a back injury, and because of this, Murakami was deemed ineligible to make the Japanese team for the 2019 World Championships. Her petition to be added to the team was denied by the Japan Gymnastics Association.

=== 2020–2021 ===
In February 2020, it was announced that Murakami would represent Japan at the Tokyo World Cup in April. However, the event was cancelled due to the COVID-19 pandemic in Japan. She returned to competition in September at the All-Japan Senior Championships, where she won gold in the all-around. In addition, she won the vault and floor exercise gold medals.

After winning the all-around titles at the 2021 All-Japan Championships and the NHK Trophy, Murakami was selected to represent Japan at the 2020 Summer Olympics and was named team captain. The team finished fifth in the team final, and Murakami also placed fifth in the all-around final. In the floor exercise final, she tied with Angelina Melnikova for the bronze medal. She became the first female Japanese gymnast to win an individual medal at the Olympics. This was also only the second time that Japan had won an Olympic medal on any women's gymnastics event, since winning bronze in the team competition at the 1964 Olympics, which were also held in Tokyo.

Murakami announced in advance of the 2021 World Championships in Kitakyushu, Japan, that it would be the final competition of her career. There, she won the gold medal on the floor exercise and the bronze medal on the balance beam.

== Coaching career ==
After retiring as an athlete, Murakami began coaching gymnastics at Nippon Sport Science University. She was named the head coach of the Japan women's national artistic gymnastics team in 2024.

== Early and personal life ==
Murakami was born in Sagamihara, Japan, and began gymnastics when she was two years old. Both of her parents were former gymnasts, and her three siblings all trained in gymnastics as well. As a child, she participated in a children's theatre troupe and also acted in TV dramas.

Murakami attended university at the Nippon Sport Science University in Tokyo. In 2023, she married a men's gymnastics coach, Atsushi Morita, after dating for over six years.

== Competitive history ==
Competitive history of Mai Murakami
Year	Event	Team	AA	VT	UB	BB	FX
2012	All-Japan Championships		11				
2012	Stuttgart World Cup	2nd place, silver medalist(s)					
2013	City of Jesolo Trophy	3rd place, bronze medalist(s)	22				
2013	All-Japan Championships		3rd place, bronze medalist(s)	1st place, gold medalist(s)			1st place, gold medalist(s)
2013	NHK Cup		3rd place, bronze medalist(s)				
2013	World Championships	—N/a					4
2014	Pacific Rim Championships	4	9		7	7	6
2014	All-Japan Championships		6				
2014	NHK Trophy		4				
2014	All-Japan Event Championships			2nd place, silver medalist(s)			1st place, gold medalist(s)
2014	World Championships	8					
2014	Glasgow World Cup		5				
2014	Toyota International			1st place, gold medalist(s)			1st place, gold medalist(s)
2015	All-Japan Championships		10				
2015	NHK Trophy		8				
2015	All-Japan Event Championships		3rd place, bronze medalist(s)				1st place, gold medalist(s)
2015	All-Japan Student Championships		2nd place, silver medalist(s)	1st place, gold medalist(s)	6	3rd place, bronze medalist(s)	3rd place, bronze medalist(s)
2015	World Championships	5	6				
2015	Toyota International			2nd place, silver medalist(s)	4		
2016	American Cup		6				
2016	All-Japan Championships		1st place, gold medalist(s)	3rd place, bronze medalist(s)	5	3rd place, bronze medalist(s)	1st place, gold medalist(s)
2016	NHK Trophy		2nd place, silver medalist(s)	2nd place, silver medalist(s)	5	19	1st place, gold medalist(s)
2016	All-Japan Event Championships				4		1st place, gold medalist(s)
2016	Olympic Games	4	14				7
2016	All-Japan Team Championships	1st place, gold medalist(s)					
2016	Toyota International			2nd place, silver medalist(s)		1st place, gold medalist(s)	1st place, gold medalist(s)
2017	All-Japan Championships		1st place, gold medalist(s)	2nd place, silver medalist(s)	4	1st place, gold medalist(s)	1st place, gold medalist(s)
2017	NHK Trophy		1st place, gold medalist(s)	3rd place, bronze medalist(s)	3rd place, bronze medalist(s)	1st place, gold medalist(s)	1st place, gold medalist(s)
2017	All-Japan Event Championships			5			2nd place, silver medalist(s)
2017	All-Japan Student Championships		2nd place, silver medalist(s)	1st place, gold medalist(s)		12	1st place, gold medalist(s)
2017	World Championships	—N/a	4			4	1st place, gold medalist(s)
2017	All-Japan Team Championships	1st place, gold medalist(s)					
2017	Toyota International			3rd place, bronze medalist(s)			1st place, gold medalist(s)
2018	American Cup		2nd place, silver medalist(s)				
2018	Tokyo World Cup		1st place, gold medalist(s)				
2018	All-Japan Championships		1st place, gold medalist(s)	2nd place, silver medalist(s)	4	1st place, gold medalist(s)	1st place, gold medalist(s)
2018	NHK Trophy		1st place, gold medalist(s)	1st place, gold medalist(s)	4	1st place, gold medalist(s)	1st place, gold medalist(s)
2018	All-Japan Event Championships					1st place, gold medalist(s)	1st place, gold medalist(s)
2018	World Championships	6	2nd place, silver medalist(s)			R3	3rd place, bronze medalist(s)
2019	American Cup		3rd place, bronze medalist(s)				
2019	All-Japan Championships		2nd place, silver medalist(s)	2nd place, silver medalist(s)	3rd place, bronze medalist(s)	2nd place, silver medalist(s)	1st place, gold medalist(s)
2019	All-Japan Event Championships			1st place, gold medalist(s)			
2020	All-Japan Senior Championships		1st place, gold medalist(s)	1st place, gold medalist(s)	3rd place, bronze medalist(s)	2nd place, silver medalist(s)	1st place, gold medalist(s)
2020	All-Japan Championships		1st place, gold medalist(s)	1st place, gold medalist(s)	1st place, gold medalist(s)	2nd place, silver medalist(s)	1st place, gold medalist(s)
2021	All-Japan Championships		1st place, gold medalist(s)				
2021	NHK Trophy		1st place, gold medalist(s)				
2021	All-Japan Event Championships			1st place, gold medalist(s)		1st place, gold medalist(s)	
2021	Olympic Games	5	5	R2			3rd place, bronze medalist(s)
2021	World Championships	—N/a				3rd place, bronze medalist(s)	1st place, gold medalist(s)
