= 2022 All-Japan Artistic Gymnastics Championships =

Sport competition

2022 All-Japan Artistic Gymnastics Championships

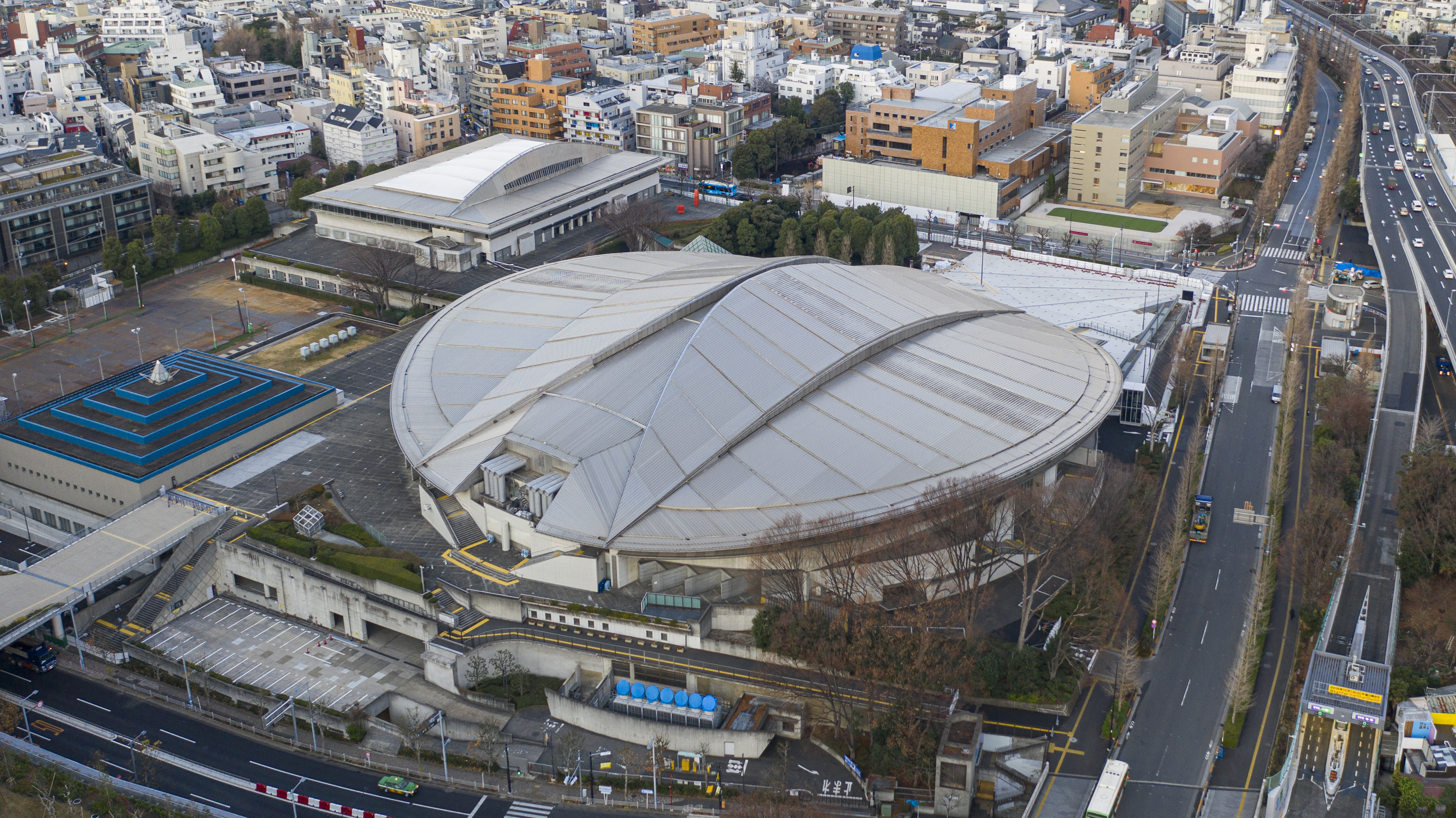
- Venue: Tokyo Metropolitan Gymnasium (Individual) (capacity: 10,000)
- Location: Shibuya, Japan (individual)
- Dates: 21 - 24 April, 2022 (individual all-around); 18 - 19 June, 2022 (apparatus)

The 76th All-Japan Artistic Gymnastics Championships was held in three separate events. The individual all-around took place from 21-24 April, which was followed by the apparatus finals on 18-19 June, and the team all-around was held 10-11 December.

After two years of being hosted by Takasaki, the competitions for individual events returned to Shibuya, Tokyo at the Tokyo Metropolitan Gymnasium. The results were used to select the men's and women's national team competing at the World Championships, Asian Games, and the Summer Universiade.

== Schedule ==
Q	Qualification	F	Finals

Date	Apr 21	Apr 22	Apr 23	Apr 24	Jun 18	Jun 19	Dec 10	Dec 11
Men's team all-around								F
Men's individual all-around		Q		F				
Men's floor					Q	F		
Men's pommel horse					Q	F		
Men's rings					Q	F		
Men's vault					Q	F		
Men's parallel bars					Q	F		
Men's horizontal bar					Q	F		
Women's team all-around							F	
Women's individual all-around	Q		F					
Women's vault					Q	F		
Women's uneven bars					Q	F		
Women's balance beam					Q	F		
Women's floor					Q	F		

== Medal summary ==
=== Men ===
Games	Gold	Silver	Bronze
Team all-around	Tokushukai Gymnastics Club; Kazuya Takahashi; Takaaki Sugino; Minori Haruki; Takeru Kitazono; Kazuki Matsumi; Carlos Yulo	Central Sports; Wataru Tanigawa; Kenta Chiba; Kaya Kazuma; Fuya Maeno; Kakeru Tanigawa; Fumiya Kitamura	National Institute of Fitness and Sports in Kanoya; Tsuyoshi Hasegawa; Katzumi Teshima; Rentaro Ueyama; Tsumura Ryota; Kiichi Kaneda; Yuui Tanabe
Individual all-around	Daiki Hashimoto; Juntendo University	Yuya Kamoto; Konami Sports	Ryosuke Doi; Nittaidai
Floor exercise	Kazuki Minami; M's Sports Club	Ryosuke Doi; Nittaidai	Daiki Hashimoto; Juntendo University
Pommel horse	Takaaki Sugino; Tokushukai / NIFS Kanoya Grad School	Kakeru Tanigawa; Central Sports	Taishi Ishizawa; Tokushukai / Seisa University
Rings	Kazuya Takahashi; Tokushukai	Kiichi Kaneta; NIFS Kanoya	Kazuyuki Takeda; Tokushukai
Vault	Keisuke Asato; Sohgoh	Hayato Uchida; Meikei Club	Keisuke Komori; Sohgoh
Parallel bars	Takeru Kitazono; Tokushukai / Seisa University	Shohei Kawakami; Tokushukai / Seisa University	Kakeru Tanigawa; Central Sports
Horizontal bar	Shohei Kawakami; Tokushukai / Seisa University	Yusuke Tanaka; Tanaka Gymnastics Club	Takeru Kitazono; Tokushukai / Seisa University

=== Women ===
Games	Gold	Silver	Bronze
Team all-around	Sabae High School; Shoko Miyata; Nono Kizaki; Hima Kusumoto; Yuika Toyama; Misaki Masui; Nanami Yamamoto	Nippon Sport Science University; Natsumi Hanashima; Hohoemi Yoshimura; Ashikawa Urara; Ayana Sakaguchi; Aoka Mori; Yuina Endo	University of Tsukuba; Juri Kashiwagi; Kokoro Fukusawa; Soyoka Hanawa; Rinne Sakatani; Mikako Serita; Tajima Yamabuki
Individual all-around	Arisa Kasahara; Legyc Sports	Shoko Miyata; Sabae Gymnastics School	Chiharu Yamada; Asahi Life
Vault	Kohane Ushioku; Legyc Sports	Kanako Saito; Kano Gymnastics Club	Ayaka Sakaguchi; Nittaidai
Uneven bars	Kokoro Fukazawa; University of Tsukuba	Mikako Serita; University of Tsukuba	Aoika Mori; Nittaidai
Balance beam	Yukia Yamaguchi; Isao Yoneda Club / Seisa HS	Ayaka Sakaguchi; Nittaidai	Urara Ashikawa; Nittaidai
Floor exercise	Yukia Yamaguchi; Isao Yoneda Club / Seisa HS	Aiko Sugihara; Mukogawa Women's University	Ayaka Sakaguchi; Nittaidai

== See also ==
- 2022 in artistic gymnastics
- 2022 in Japanese artistic gymnastics
- Japan men's national gymnastics team
