= Ōtemachi =

Ōtemachi 大手町
- District
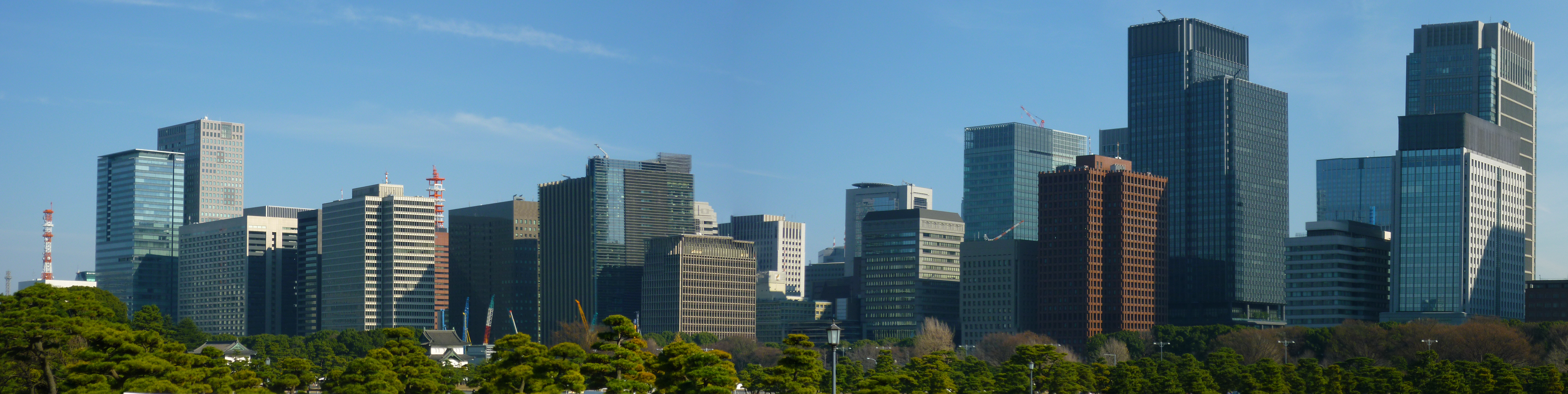
- Otemachi and Marunouchi
- Interactive map of Ōtemachi
- Coordinates: 35°41′17″N 139°45′51″E
- Country: Japan
- City: Tokyo
- Ward: Chiyoda
- Area: Kōjimachi Area

Population (February 1, 2009)
  - Total: 2
- Time zone: UTC+9 (JST)
- Postal code: 100-0004
- Area code: 03

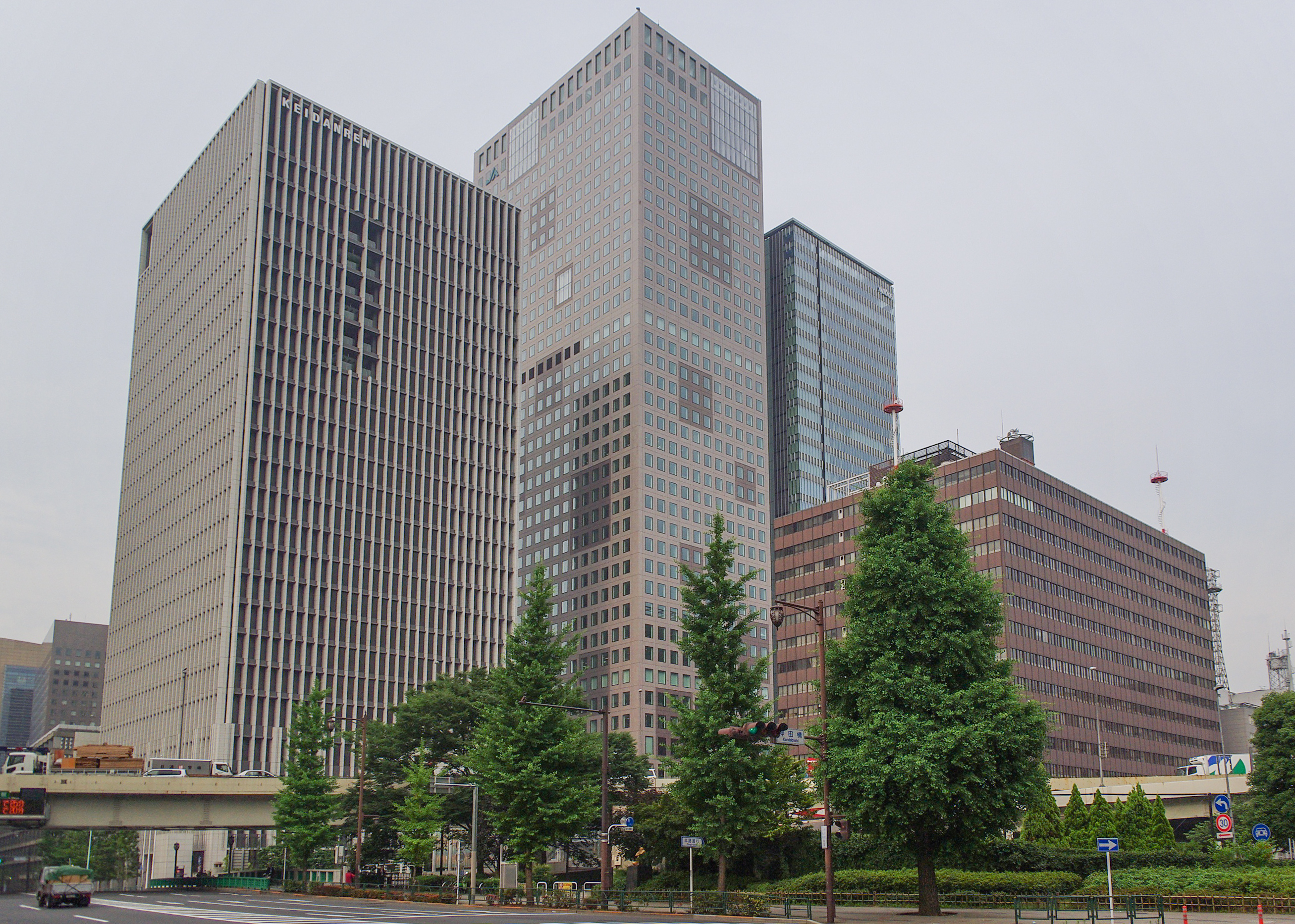
Tokyo Otemachi 1-chome Redevelopment Bldgs 20100618-001

Ōtemachi (大手町) is a district of Chiyoda, Tokyo, Japan. It is located north of Tokyo Station and Marunouchi, east of the Imperial Palace, west of Nihonbashi and south of Kanda. It is the location of the former site of the village of Shibazaki, the most ancient part of Tokyo.

Ōtemachi is known as a center of Japanese journalism, housing the main offices of three of the "big five" newspapers as well as being a key financial center and headquarters for large Japanese corporations.

The Tokyo Fire Department is headquartered in Ōtemachi.

== History ==
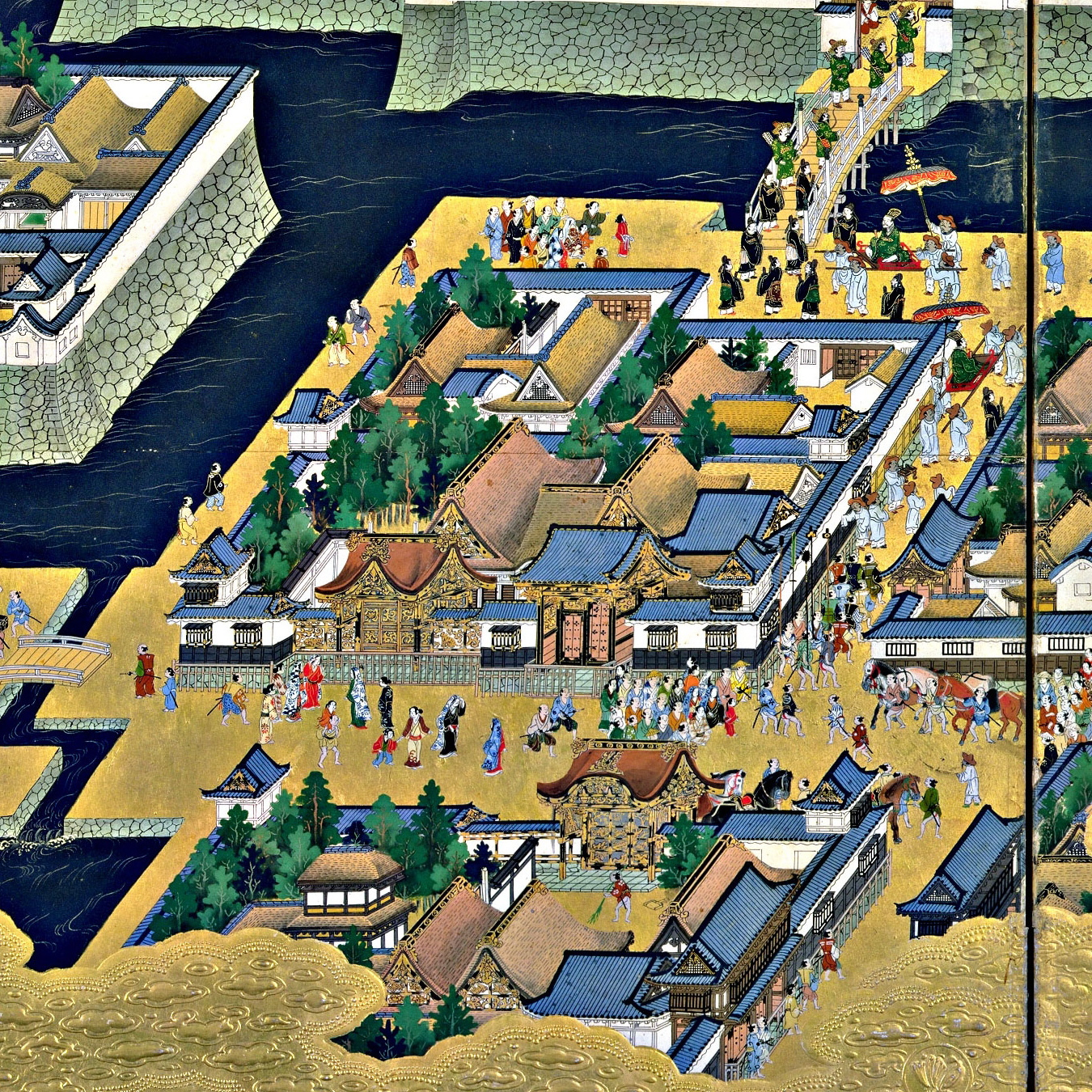
View of a part of Ōtemachi as depicted in the Edo-zu byōbu screens (17th century CE)

Ōtemachi derives its name of Ōtemon ("Great Hand Gate") of Edo Castle. During the Edo period, various daimyōs constructed their lavish residences outside the castle, such as the residence of the daimyō Matsudaira Tadamasa. Ōtemachi was completely destroyed during the Great Fire of Meireki in 1657. It was rebuilt, albeit on a smaller, less grand scale. Ōtemachi remained however in the possession of the various daimyō families until the end of the Tokugawa system and the start of the Meiji period in the 1860s. The various daimyō families lost their lots as the area was repossessed by the government, who constructed various governmental offices. Today nothing remains of its residential past, the area is dotted with modern high-rise buildings.

In order to gain revenue, the government decided to sell the area into private hands. The area was completely redeveloped.

== Businesses based in Ōtemachi ==
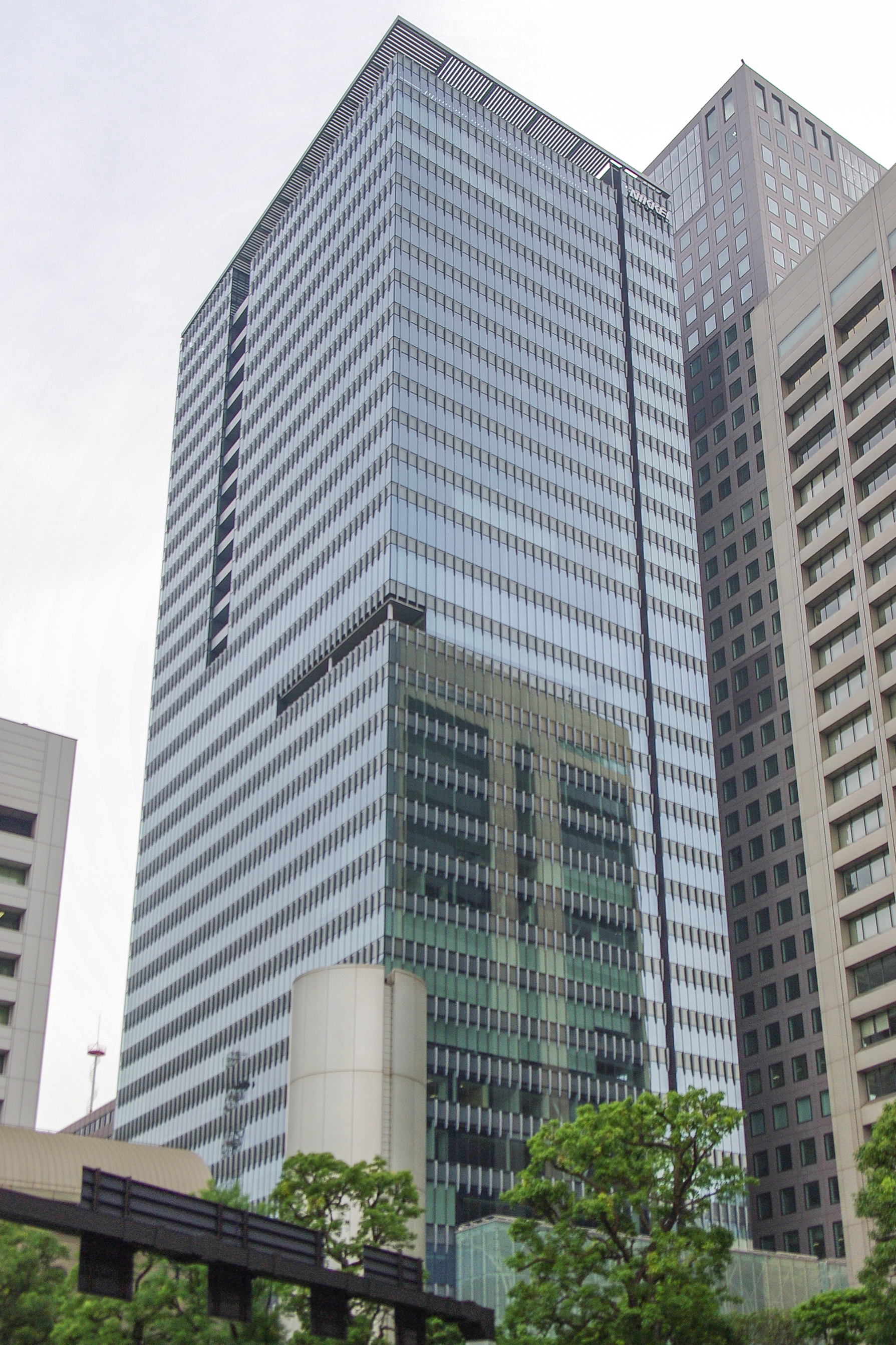
Headquarters of The Nikkei

- Asahi Life
- Daiwa Securities Group
- Development Bank of Japan
- Japan Post
- Kyowa Hakko Kirin
- Marubeni
- Millea Holdings
- Mitsubishi Estate
- Mitsui & Co.
- Mitsui Life Insurance Co.
- Mizuho Financial Group
- Japan Finance Corporation
- Nihon Keizai Shimbun
- Nippon Soda
- Nippon Telegraph and Telephone
- Nishimura & Asahi
- Sankei Shimbun
- Shin-Etsu Chemical
- Yomiuri Shimbun

The Japanese offices of Sullivan & Cromwell, Citibank, Cushman & Wakefield, and Protiviti are also located in Ōtemachi.

== Railway and subway stations ==
- Ōtemachi Station (Chiyoda Line, Hanzōmon Line, Marunouchi Line, Toei Mita Line, Tozai Line)
- Tokyo Station, actually in the neighboring Marunouchi district (Chūō Line, Keihin-Tōhoku Line, Keiyō Line, Marunouchi Line, Shinkansen, Sōbu Line, Yamanote Line, Yokosuka Line)

It is possible to transfer between the two stations via underground passages.

== Education ==
Chiyoda Board of Education operates public elementary and junior high schools. All of Otemachi 2-chome and most of Otemachi 1-chome is zoned to Chiyoda Elementary School (千代田小学校) while a portion of 1-chome is zoned to Ochanomizu Elementary School (お茶の水小学校). There is a freedom of choice system for junior high schools in Chiyoda Ward, and so there are no specific junior high school attendance zones.

== See also ==
- Taira no Masakado
