= 2021 All-Japan Artistic Gymnastics Championships =

Gymnastics competition in Japan

2021 All-Japan Artistic Gymnastics Championships

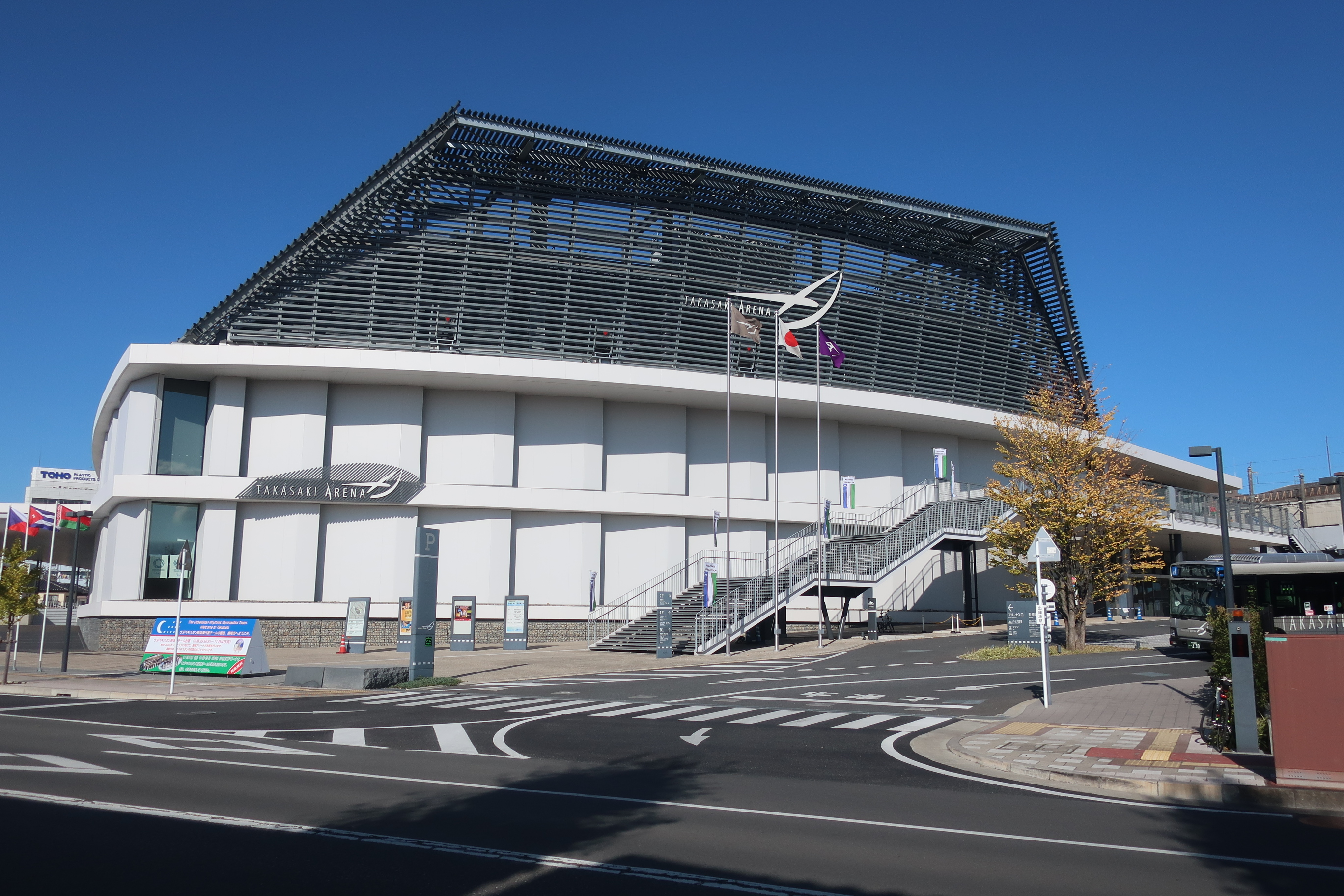
- Venue: Yoyogi National Gymnasium (team) (capacity: 13,291); Takasaki Arena (Individual) (capacity: 36,500)
- Location: Takasaki, Japan individual); Tokyo, Japan (team)
- Dates: 15 - 18 April, 2021 (individual all-around); 05 - 06 June, 2021 (apparatus); 11 - 12 December, 2021 (team)

The 75th All-Japan Artistic Gymnastics Championships was held on 3 occasions. The individual all-around took place from 15-18 April, followed by the apparatus finals on 5-6 June, and finally the team all-around from 11-12 December.

Takasaki hosted all the individual events, both all-around and apparatus, while the team competition was held in Yoyogi National Gymnasium in Shibuya, Tokyo. The tournaments also served as the national trials for the 2020 Summer Olympics, with the participation of over 170 gymnasts nationwide.

== Qualification ==
=== Men's Events ===
==== Individual All-around ====
The maximum of 90 male gymnasts would be qualified to compete for the men's individual all-around event, following these criteria:

- 2020 All Japan Artistic Gymnastics Championships top ranks: 44 gymnasts.
- National Tryout (tournament 3): 18 gymnasts.
- Men's Junior Strengthening Department recommendation: 5 gymnasts.
- Japan Gymnastics Association recommendation: 5 gymnasts.
- 2021 Summer Universiade shortlist: 18 gymnasts.
  - 53rd All Japan Senior Gymnastics Championships top team: 6 slots.
  - Gakuren recommendation: 12 gymnasts.

==== Individual Apparatus ====
The maximum of 24 male gymnasts would be qualified to compete for the men's individual all-around event, following these criteria:

① Winner of 2020 event and the gymnast selected to represent Japan at the World Cup in Doha; or top 2 of 2020 event.

② Top 22-24 gymnasts (not included in ①) all-around qualifying and tryout results to make the maximum of 24.

③ 2 spot for team contribution based on the results up to the NHK Trophy among the players who met the B-selection conditions (NHK Trophy 10th place or less, best team member, world ranking 1st-place winner). This 2 gymnast who didn't passed the All-Japan event-specific qualifying were allowed to perform (but wouldn't advance to the final)

• Selected athletes for ③ were allowed perform, but the results wouldn't be in the eventual ranking.

• The selection of qualification ③ was announced after the end of the NHK Trophy.

==== Team All-around ====
16 male gymnastics clubs qualified for the team final following these criteria:

- 12 teams with the highest scores at the competitions below:
  - 75th All Japan Student Championships (1st division)
  - 75th All Japan Student Championships (2nd division)
  - 54th All Japan Senior Gymnastics Championships (1st division)
- Top 2 teams of the 2021 All-Japan Junior Championships.
- 1 team with the highest score at the 2021 National High School Championships that hadn't qualified yet.
- 1 Junior National Selection team.

== Schedule ==
Q	Qualification	F	Finals

Date	Apr 15	Apr 16	Apr 17	Apr 18	Jun 5	Jun 6	Dec 11	Dec 12
Men's team all-around								F
Men's individual all-around		Q		F				
Men's floor					Q	F		
Men's pommel horse					Q	F		
Men's rings					Q	F		
Men's vault					Q	F		
Men's parallel bars					Q	F		
Men's horizontal bar					Q	F		
Women's team all-around							F	
Women's individual all-around	Q		F					
Women's vault					Q	F		
Women's uneven bars					Q	F		
Women's balance beam					Q	F		
Women's floor					Q	F		

== Medal summary ==
=== Men ===
Games	Gold	Silver	Bronze
Team all-around	Juntendo University; Shigeto Suzuki; Keitaro Okubo; Teppei Miwa; Daiki Hashimoto; Kakuto Murayama; Azusa Emata	Tokushukai Gymnastics Club; Kazuya Takahashi; Seiya Taura; Takaaki Sugino; Minori Haruki; Takeru Kitazono; Kentaro Yunoki	Central Sports; Shogo Nonomura; Wataru Tanigawa; Kenta Chiba; Kazuma Kaya; Kakeru Tanigawa; Fuya Maeno
Individual all-around	Daiki Hashimoto; Juntendo University	Wataru Tanigawa; Central Sports	Kazuma Kaya; Central Sports
Floor exercise	Kazuki Minami; Sendai University	Kenzo Shirai; Nittaidai (teaching)	Ryosuke Doi; Nittaidai
Pommel horse	Yamato Ichiguchi; NIFS Kanoya	Kenta Chiba; Central Sports	Kakeru Tanigawa; Central Sports
Rings	Yuya Kamoto; Konami Sports	Kazuya Takahashi; Tokushukai Gymnastics Club	Takuya Nagano; Kagoshima Sports Association
Vault	Hidenobu Yonekura; Tokushukai Gymnastics Club	Junya Sakumoto; Shizuoka Sangyo University	Hiyo Kabeya; Nihon University
Parallel bars	Yusuke Tanaka; Konami Sports	not awarded	Carlos Yulo; Asahi Life
Parallel bars	Kaito Sugimoto; Nittaidai	not awarded	Carlos Yulo; Asahi Life
Horizontal bar	Daiki Hashimoto; Juntendo University	Kohei Uchimura; Joyca	Takaaki Sugino; Tokushukai Gymnastics Club/NIFS Kanoya

=== Women ===
Games	Gold	Silver	Bronze
Team all-around	Nittaidai	Legyc Sports	Sabae High School
Individual all-around	Mai Murakami; Nittaidai club	Hitomi Hatakeda; Central Sports	Yuna Hiraiwa; Toda Sports
Vault	Mai Murakami; Nittaidai club	Shoko Miyata; Sabae Gymnastics School	Chiaki Hatakeda; Central Sports
Uneven bars	Hitomi Hatakeda; Central Sports	Ai Takagi; Sohgoh	Yumika Nakamura; Nittaidai club
Balance beam	Mai Murakami; Nittaidai club	Aiko Sugihara; Mukogawa Women's University	Yumika Nakamura; Nittaidai club
Floor exercise	Aiko Sugihara; Mukogawa Women's University	Chiaki Hatakeda; Central Sports	Sae Miyakawa; Sun Music

== See also ==
- 2021 in artistic gymnastics
- Japan men's national gymnastics team
