= Takaaki Sugino =

Japanese artistic gymnast

- 杉野 正尭
- Born: 18 October 1998 (age 28) Tsu, Mie, Japan
- Height: 1.70 m (5 ft 7 in)

Gymnastics career
- Discipline: Men's artistic gymnastics
- Country represented: Japan; (2017–present)
- College team: NIFS Kanoya
- Club: Tokushukai Gymnastics Club
- Head coaches: Yuji Sano, Yuya Shintaku, Naoki Morichika
Medal record
Representing Japan
Olympic Games
Gold medal – first place	2024 Paris	Team
FIG World Cup
Event	1st	2nd	3rd
Apparatus World Cup	0	1	1
World Challenge Cup	4	0	0
Total	4	1	1

Takaaki Sugino (杉野 正尭, Sugino Takaaki; born 18 October 1998) is a Japanese artistic gymnast. He won a gold medal with the Japanese team at the 2024 Summer Olympics.

== Early and personal life ==
Sugino was born in Tsu, Mie, and began gymnastics when he was six. He has two older brothers who also competed in gymnastics. His father died of cancer when he was in high school. He graduated from National Institute of Fitness and Sports in Kanoya and joined the Tokushukai Gymnastics Club.

== Career ==
=== 2017 ===
Sugino won the gold medal on the pommel horse at the Paris World Challenge Cup. In December, he competed at the Toyota International and won the gold medal on the pommel horse.

=== 2018 ===
Sugino won a bronze medal on the pommel horse at the Baku World Cup. He placed 29th in the all-around at the All-Japan Championships with the highest score on the pommel horse. He then placed 26th in the all-around at the NHK Trophy. He narrowly won the gold medal on the horizontal bar ahead of Audrys Nin Reyes at the Koper World Challenge Cup. Then at the All-Japan Event Championships, he placed fifth on the pommel horse. He placed eighth with his university at the All-Japan Team Championships.

=== 2019 ===
Sugino won a bronze medal on the pommel horse at the All-Japan Championships. Then at the All-Japan Event Championships, he won the gold medal on the pommel horse and tied for fifth on the horizontal bar. He tied for seventh place in the all-around at the All-Japan Student Championships. Then in September, he won gold medals on the floor exercise and pommel horse at the Guimaraes World Challenge Cup. At the end of the year, he finished tenth with his university at the All-Japan Team Championships.

=== 2020 ===
Sugino placed second on the pommel horse in the qualification of the Baku World Cup before the event finals were canceled due to the COVID-19 pandemic. In October, he placed seventh in the all-around at the All-Japan Student Championships. Then in December, he finished 23rd in the all-around and eighth in the horizontal bar final.

=== 2021 ===
Sugino placed eighth in the all-around at the All-Japan Championships. He then placed sixth at the NHK Trophy. At the All-Japan Event Championships, he placed eighth on the pommel horse and won the bronze medal on the horizontal bar behind Daiki Hashimoto and Kōhei Uchimura. He was not selected for the Japanese Olympic team. He won the silver medal in the all-around at the All-Japan Senior Championships behind Kaya Kazuma. At the end of the season, he won a silver medal with his club team at the All-Japan Team Championships.

=== 2022 ===
Sugino finished 12th in the all-around at the All-Japan Championships. He then finished fifth at the NHK Trophy and also had the highest scores on the pommel horse and the horizontal bar. At the All-Japan Event Championships, he won the gold medal on the pommel horse and also placed fifth on the horizontal bar. He won a gold medal with his club team at the All-Japan Team Championships.

=== 2023 ===
At the Doha World Cup, Sugino finished fifth on the floor exercise and fourth on the pommel horse. Then at the All-Japan Championships, he placed 12th in the all-around and had the highest score on the pommel horse. He then placed 21st in the all-around at the NHK Trophy. He won the pommel horse title at the All-Japan Event Championships and won the bronze medal on the horizontal bar. In September, he won the all-around title at the All-Japan Senior Championships. Sugino ended the season with a gold medal with his club at the All-Japan Team Championships.

=== 2024 ===
Sugino placed fourth in the all-around at the All-Japan Championships, about one point away from the bronze medal. He finished fifth in the all-around at the NHK Trophy and had the second-highest scores on the floor exercise, pommel horse, and horizontal bar. He was then selected to represent Japan at the 2024 Summer Olympics in Paris, France, alongside Tanigawa Wataru, Oka Shinnosuke, Kaya Kazuma, and Hashimoto Daiki. They won the gold medal in the team final on July 29, defeating long-time rival China. Then in the pommel horse final, he finished in sixth place with a score of 14.933. He fell in the horizontal bar final and finished seventh.
