= Gymnastics at the 2020 Summer Olympics – Men's horizontal bar =

Men's horizontal bar at the Games of the XXXII Olympiad
- Olympic artistic gymnastics
- Venue: Ariake Gymnastics Centre
- Date: 24 July 2021 (qualifying); 3 August 2021 (final)
- Competitors: 8 from 7 nations
- Winning score: 15.066 points

Medalists
1st place, gold medalist(s)		Daiki Hashimoto	Japan
2nd place, silver medalist(s)		Tin Srbić	Croatia
3rd place, bronze medalist(s)		Nikita Nagornyy	ROC

The men's horizontal bar event at the 2020 Summer Olympics was held on 24 July and 3 August 2021 at the Ariake Gymnastics Centre. Approximately 70 gymnasts from 35 nations (of the 98 total gymnasts) competed on the horizontal bar in the qualifying round.

Japan's Daiki Hashimoto won the event to earn his second title of the 2020 Olympics and third Olympic medal overall. Tin Srbić of Croatia took silver for his first Olympic medal. ROC's Nikita Nagornyy finished with the bronze, his second individual bronze and fourth Olympic medal overall. None of the 2016 medalists entered the event as they all retired from competitions.

== Background ==
This was the 25th appearance of the event, which is one of the five apparatus events held every time there were apparatus events at the Summer Olympics (no apparatus events were held in 1900, 1908, 1912, or 1920).

== Qualification ==
A National Olympic Committee (NOC) could enter up to 6 qualified gymnasts: a team of 4 and up to 2 specialists. A total of 98 quota places are allocated to men's gymnastics.

The 12 teams that qualify will be able to send 4 gymnasts in the team competition, for a total of 48 of the 98 quota places. The top three teams at the 2018 World Artistic Gymnastics Championships (China, Russia, and Japan) and the top nine teams (excluding those already qualified) at the 2019 World Artistic Gymnastics Championships (Ukraine, Great Britain, Switzerland, the United States, Chinese Taipei, South Korea, Brazil, Spain, and Germany) earned team qualification places.

The remaining 50 quota places are awarded individually. Each gymnast can only earn one place, except that gymnasts that competed with a team that qualified are eligible to earn a second place through the 2020 All Around World Cup Series. Some of the individual events are open to gymnasts from NOCs with qualified teams, while others are not. These places are filled through various criteria based on the 2019 World Championships, the 2020 FIG Artistic Gymnastics World Cup series, continental championships, a host guarantee, and a Tripartite Commission invitation.

Each of the 98 qualified gymnasts are eligible for the pommel horse competition, but many gymnasts do not compete in each of the apparatus events.

The COVID-19 pandemic delayed many of the events for qualifying for gymnastics. The 2018 and 2019 World Championships were completed on time, but many of the World Cup series events were delayed into 2021.

== Competition format ==
The top 8 qualifiers in the qualification phase (limit two per NOC) advance to the apparatus final. The finalists perform an additional exercise. Qualification scores are then ignored, with only final round scores counting.

== Schedule ==
The competition is held over two days, 24 July and 3 August. The qualifying round (for all men's gymnastics events) is the first day; the apparatus final is on the second day.

Date	Time	Round	Subdivision
24 July	10:00	Qualification	Subdivision 1
24 July	14:30	Qualification	Subdivision 2
24 July	19:30	Qualification	Subdivision 3
3 August	18:39	Final	–
All times are local time (UTC+09:00).

== Results ==
=== Qualifying ===
Rank	Gymnast	D Score	E Score	Pen.	Total	Qual.
1	Daiki Hashimoto (JPN)	6.5	8.533		15.033	Q
2	Milad Karimi (KAZ)	6.4	8.366		14.766	Q
3	Tin Srbić (CRO)	6.2	8.433		14.633	Q
4	Brody Malone (USA)	6.5	8.033		14.533	Q
5	Nikita Nagornyy (ROC)	6.0	8.466		14.466	Q
6	Takeru Kitazono (JPN)	5.9	8.533		14.433	Q
7	Tyson Bull (AUS)	6.3	8.133		14.433	Q
8	Bart Deurloo (NED)	6.5	7.900		14.400	Q
9	Marios Georgiou (CYP)	6.1	8.233		14.333	R1
10	Xiao Ruoteng (CHN)	6.0	8.266		14.266	R2
11	Lin Chaopan (CHN)	6.3	7.900		14.200	R3

Reserves

The reserves for the men's horizontal bar final were:

1. Marios Georgiou (CYP)
2. Xiao Ruoteng (CHN)
3. Lin Chaopan (CHN)

Only two gymnasts from each country may advance to the event final. No gymnasts were excluded from the final or as reserves because of the quota.

=== Final ===
Rank	Gymnast	D Score	E Score	Pen.	Total
1st place, gold medalist(s)	Daiki Hashimoto (JPN)	6.5	8.566		15.066
2nd place, silver medalist(s)	Tin Srbić (CRO)	6.5	8.400		14.900
3rd place, bronze medalist(s)	Nikita Nagornyy (ROC)	6.0	8.533		14.533
4	Brody Malone (USA)	6.5	7.700		14.200
5	Tyson Bull (AUS)	5.8	6.666		12.466
6	Takeru Kitazono (JPN)	6.1	6.233		12.333
7	Bart Deurloo (NED)	5.6	6.666		12.266
8	Milad Karimi (KAZ)	5.0	6.266		11.266
