= Kakuto Murayama =

Japanese artistic gymnast

- Full name: 村山 覚人
- Born: 2 July 2000 (age 26) Okayama, Japan

Gymnastics career
- Discipline: Men's artistic gymnastics
- Country represented: Japan
- College team: Juntendo University
- Club: Juntendo University
- Head coach: Hiroyuki Tomita (club)
Medal record
Representing Japan
Junior Asian Championships
Gold medal – first place	2017 Bangkok	Team
Gold medal – first place	2017 Bangkok	All-around
Gold medal – first place	2017 Bangkok	Horizontal Bar
Silver medal – second place	2017 Bangkok	Floor Exercise

Kakuto Murayama (村山 覚人, Murayama Kakuto; born 2 July 2000) is a Japanese artistic gymnast.

== Competitive history ==
Year	Event	Team	AA	FX	PH	SR	VT	PB	HB
2021	All Japan Championships	1st place, gold medalist(s)	29						
2021	NHK Trophy		27						
2021	All Japan Student Championships	1st place, gold medalist(s)	8						

== Detailed results ==
Year	Tournament	Event	Date	All Around	Floor (gymnastics)	Pommel horse	Rings (gymnastics)	Vault (gymnastics)	Parallel bars	Horizontal bar
2021	All Japan Championships AA Tryout		7 March	84.431	13.933	14.233	13.166	14.633	14.500	13.966
2021	All Japan Individual All-around Championships	Qualification	16 April	81.864	14.366	12.566	13.066	14.433	13.633	13.800
2021	All Japan Individual All-around Championships	AA Final	18 April	81.331	13.733	14.166	12.766	14.200	13.666	12.800
2021	NHK Trophy		16 May	81.396	14.466	13.966	12.866	12.366	13.966	13.766
2021	All Japan Student Championships		01 - 4 September	82.965	14.200	14.166	12.233	14.400	14.366	13.600
2021	All Japan Team Championship		12 December		14.000				14.033	

== See also ==
- Japan men's national gymnastics team
