= Kamiyashiki of Matsudaira Tadamasa =

- 松平忠昌の上屋敷
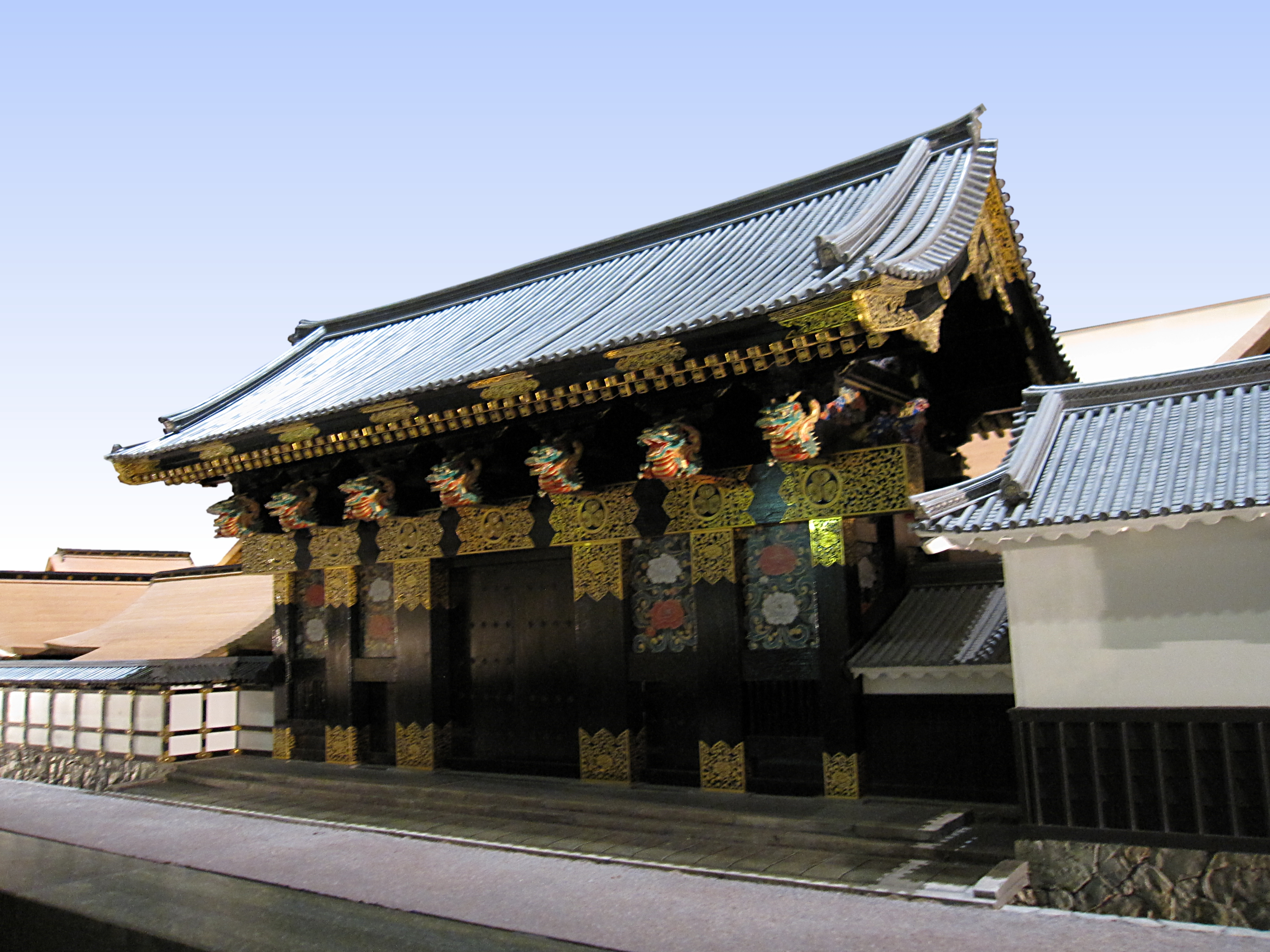
- 1:30 model of the main gate seimon that was next to the daidokoro

- Location within Special wards of Tokyo Location within Tokyo Location within Japan

General information
- Type: daimyo yashiki
- Location: Ōtemachi, Edo, Japan
- Coordinates: 35°41′13″N 139°46′6″E
- Destroyed: 1657

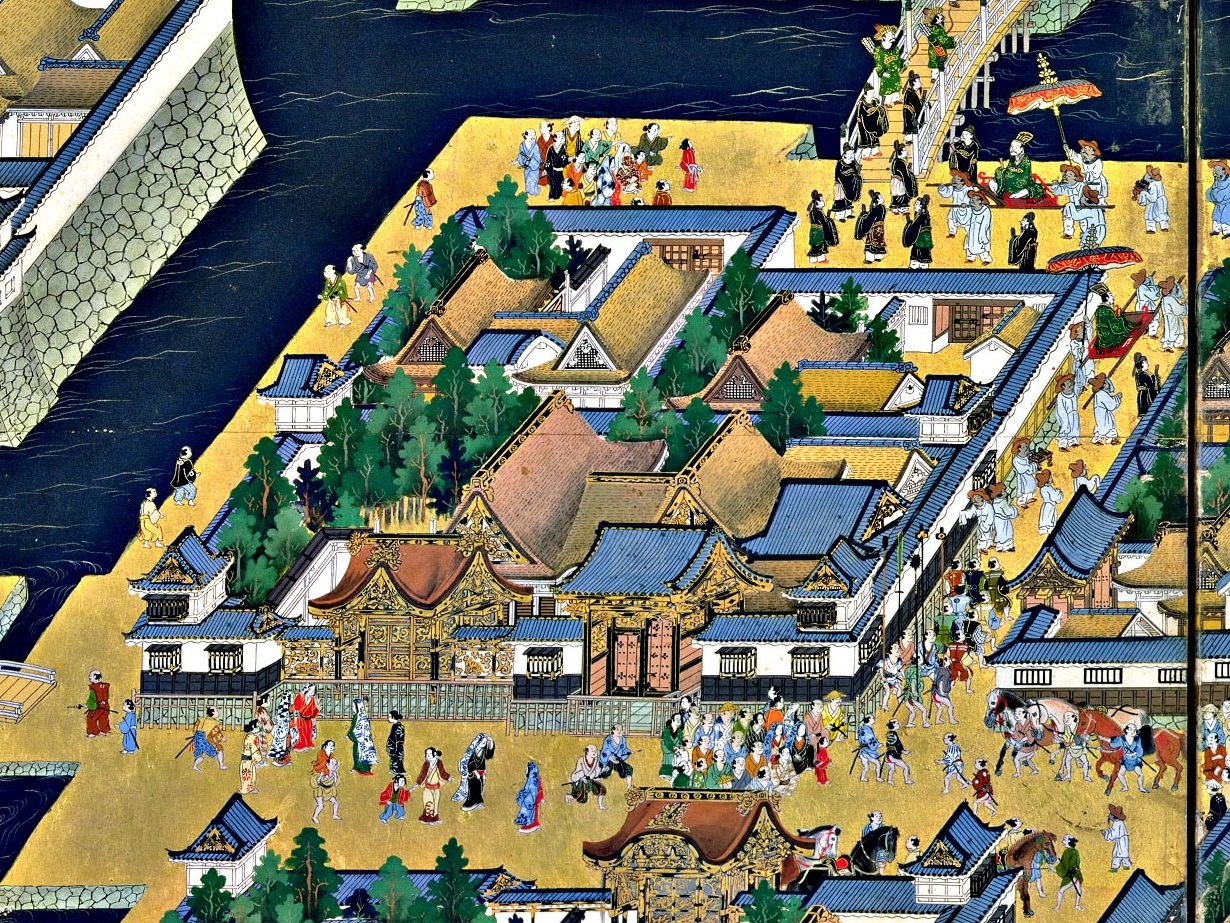
Upper residence of Matsudaira Tadamasa as depicted in the Edo-zu byōbu screens (17th century)

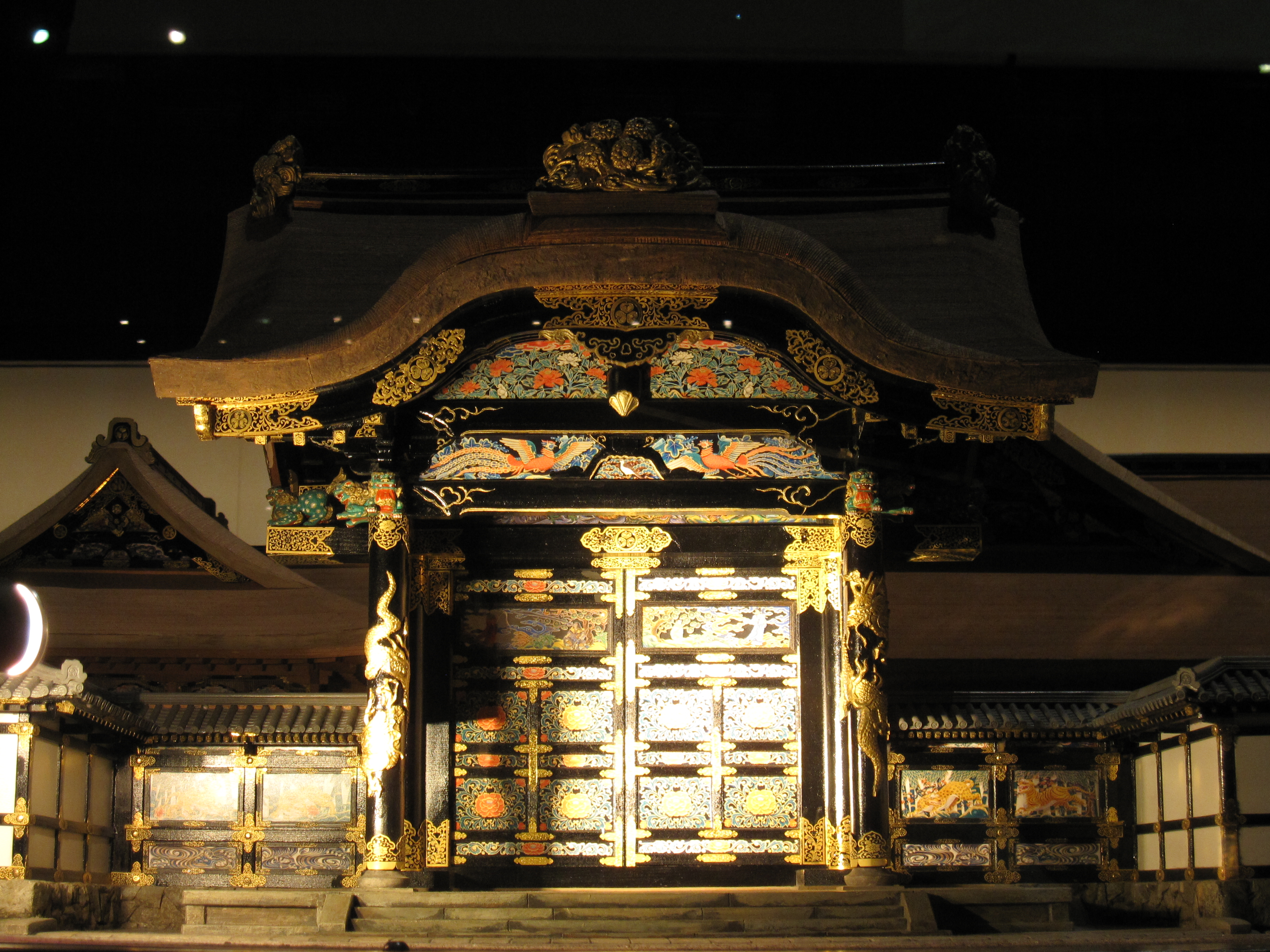
1:30 architectural model of the gate reserved for high visitors, in the Edo-Tokyo Museum

The Kamiyashiki of Matsudaira Tadamasa (松平忠昌の上屋敷, Matsudaira Tadamasa no kamiyashiki) was a large residential complex that was located outside Edo Castle in 17th century Japan.

== History ==
Matsudaira Tadamasa (1597–1645) was daimyō of Fukui Domain and a grandson of Tokugawa Ieyasu. His "upper residence" or main residence (上屋敷 kamiyashiki) was in front of the Ōtemon gate of Edo Castle in what is now Ōtemachi, Tokyo. During the Edo period, a kamiyashiki was main residence of a daimyō, and served as his primary residence and the residence of his official wife and heir, as well as much of his entourage while he was staying in Edo on sankin-kōtai. It was also a place where he conducted the day-to-day affairs of the domain while he was in Edo. Most domains had a "lower" or smaller residence or retreat, called shimoyashiki (下屋敷), typically located in the outskirts of Edo, which also served as a place of refuge should the main residence be destroyed in one of the many fires which plagued the city. Some domains also maintained another spare Edo residence, known as the nakayashiki (中屋敷), located at some intermediate distance, which was often inhabited by the younger generation who would succeed to the lordship, or to a retired former lord.

This residence of Matsudaira Tadamasa was a magnificent Momoyama-style compound, constructed on a large lot. In 1657 however, during the disastrous Great Fire of Meireki, this mansion burned to the ground. Thereafter, such luxurious residences were no longer built.

== Architecture ==
The mansion consisted of a main building with two large roofs, constructed of cryptomeria wood. The residence was only one storey high in the typical shōin style, with large roofs for ventilation. Apart from the main residence there were other minor buildings for servants as well as a number of gardens with trees. The complex was protected by high, white-washed walls with two-storey watch towers at each corner. The main access to the residence was through two large gates, while there were minor gates for servants in the back. One broad gate was close to the daidokoro, which was in the main part of the residence, while a second gate was reserved normally only for high visitors such as the shōgun himself. The gate for the shōgun was monumental in proportions, painted black with golden adornments, with two painted phoenixes above. The curved roof with the symbol of the Matsudaira clan above added to a sense of importance. A small moat ran along three sides of the mansion.

The layout and appearance was typical for the daimyō residences in the Ōtemachi area outside Edo Castle, as is evidenced in the depiction seen on the contemporary Edo-zu byōbu screens from the 17th century.

The 1/30 scale model in the Edo-Tokyo Museum was reproduced based mainly on three sources: illustrations in the Iyo-dono yashiki sashi-zu ("Illustrations of the mansion of the Governor of Iyo") which is in the possession of the Ikeda family archives at Okayama University, the Edo-zu byōbu ("Screens of Edo") in the collection of the National Museum of Japanese History, and the Kōra Kōnen oboegaki ("Memorandum of Kōra Kōnen") in the Tokyo Metropolitan Library. Some of the minor structures have been left out in the model in order to highlight the main buildings in the back. The minor buildings included servants quarters, storage, stables, etc. and their position is indicated by the beige layout on the white ground.

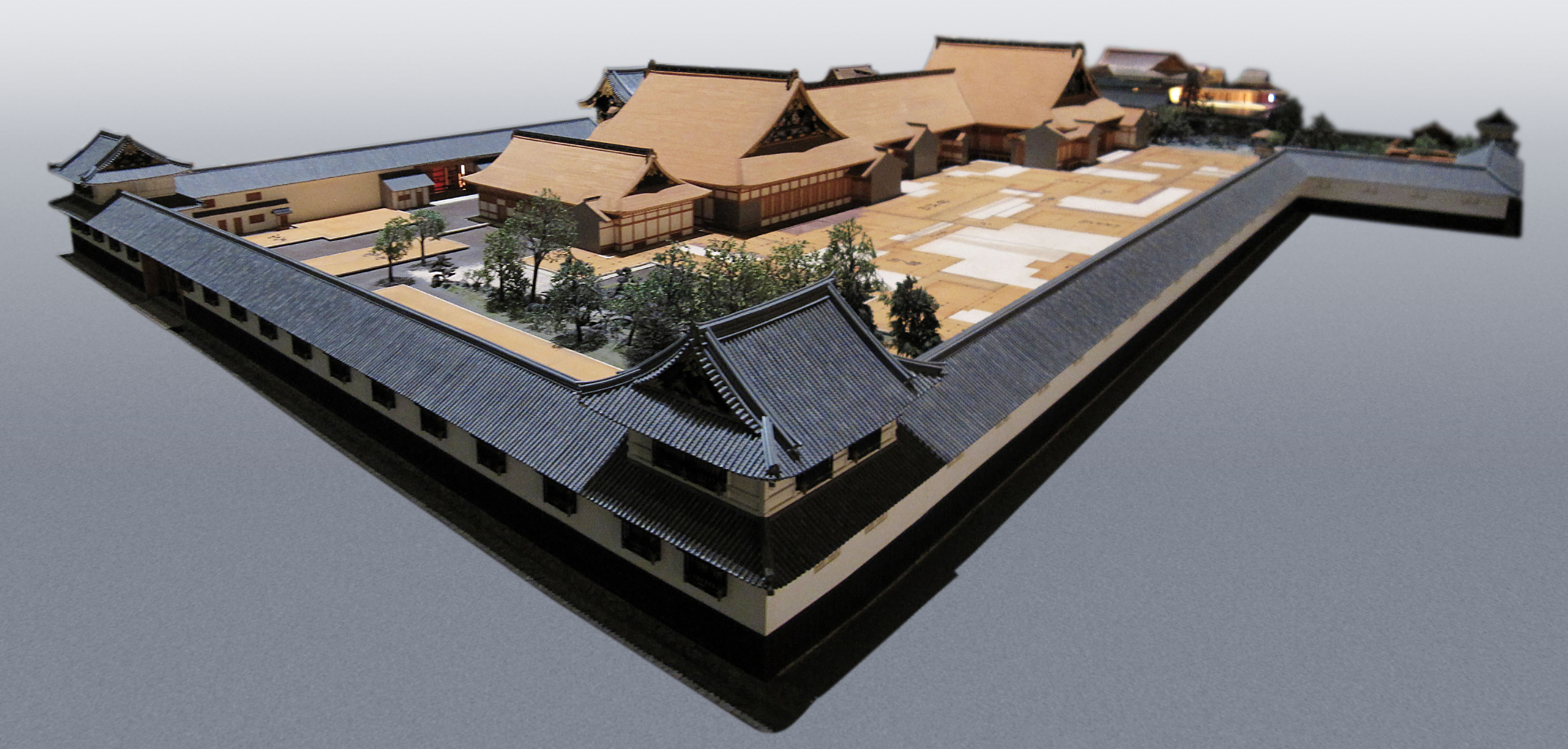
1:30 scale architectural model of the residence, in the Edo-Tokyo Museum

== See also ==
- Ōzone Oshitayashiki in Nagoya
