= Daiki Hashimoto =

Japanese artistic gymnast

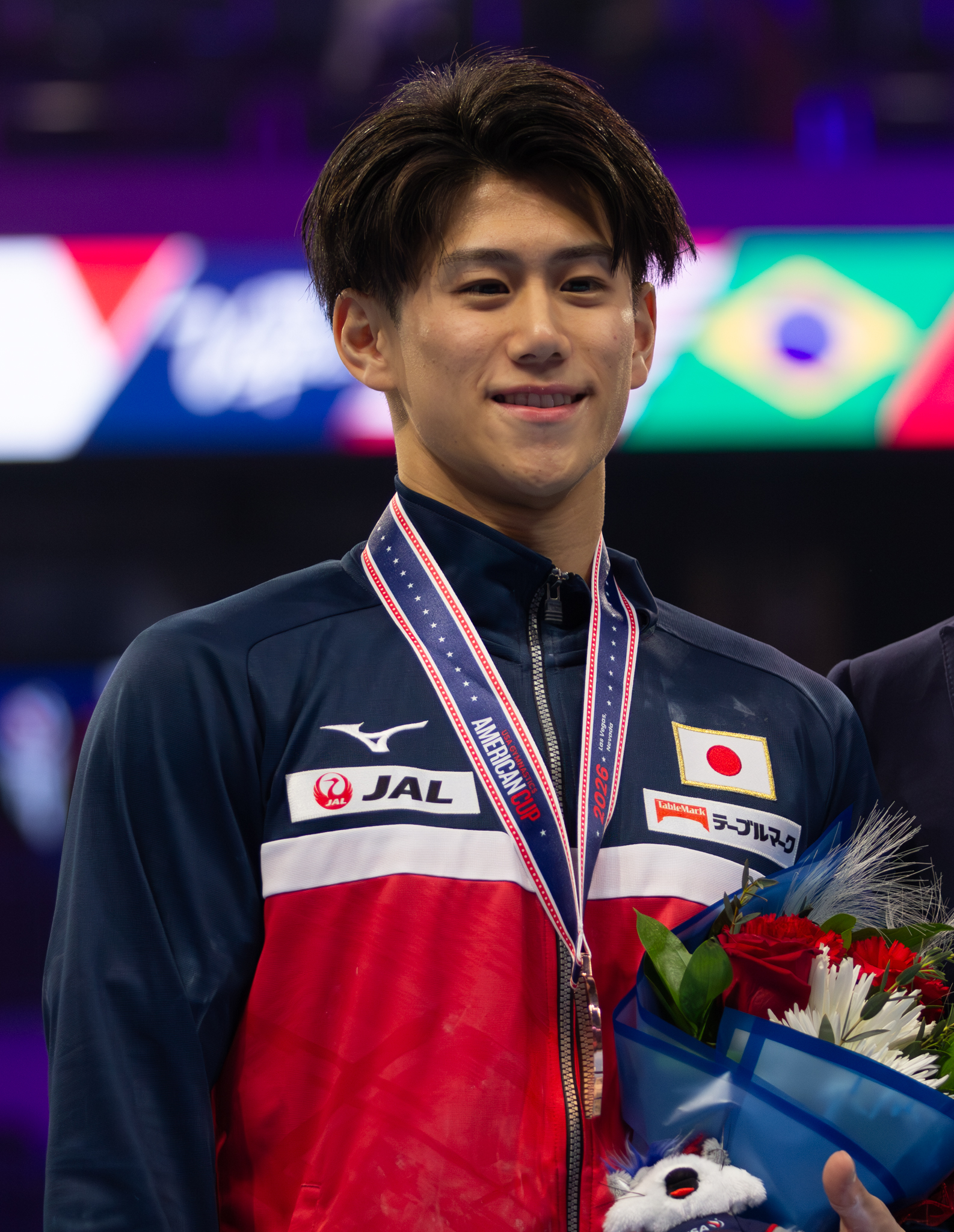
- Hashimoto at the 2026 American Cup

Personal information
- Nickname: Mr. Infinite Stamina
- Born: 7 August 2001 (age 25) Narita, Japan
- Height: 1.66 m (5 ft 5 in)

Gymnastics career
- Discipline: Men's artistic gymnastics
- Country represented: Japan
- College team: Juntendo University
- Club: Juntendo University
- Head coaches: Hiroyuki Tomita (club); Hisashi Mizutori (national)
Medal record
Representing Japan
Men's artistic gymnastics
Event	1st	2nd	3rd
Olympic Games	3	1	0
World Championships	7	6	1
Summer Universiade	2	3	0
Total	12	10	1
Olympic Games
Gold medal – first place	2020 Tokyo	All-Around
Gold medal – first place	2020 Tokyo	Horizontal Bar
Gold medal – first place	2024 Paris	Team
Silver medal – second place	2020 Tokyo	Team
World Championships
Gold medal – first place	2022 Liverpool	All-Around
Gold medal – first place	2023 Antwerp	Team
Gold medal – first place	2023 Antwerp	All-Around
Gold medal – first place	2023 Antwerp	Horizontal Bar
Gold medal – first place	2025 Jakarta	All-Around
Gold medal – first place	2026 Rotterdam	Team
Gold medal – first place	2026 Rotterdam	All-Around
Silver medal – second place	2021 Kitakyushu	All-Around
Silver medal – second place	2021 Kitakyushu	Horizontal Bar
Silver medal – second place	2022 Liverpool	Team
Silver medal – second place	2022 Liverpool	Floor Exercise
Silver medal – second place	2022 Liverpool	Horizontal Bar
Silver medal – second place	2025 Jakarta	Horizontal Bar
Bronze medal – third place	2019 Stuttgart	Team
Asian Games
Silver medal – second place	2026 Aichi-Nagoya	Team
Bronze medal – third place	2026 Aichi-Nagoya	All-around
Bronze medal – third place	2026 Aichi-Nagoya	Pommel horse
World University Games
Gold medal – first place	2025 Rhine-Ruhr	Team
Gold medal – first place	2025 Rhine-Ruhr	All-Around
Silver medal – second place	2021 Chengdu	Team
Silver medal – second place	2025 Rhine-Ruhr	Pommel horse
Silver medal – second place	2025 Rhine-Ruhr	Horizontal bar

Daiki Hashimoto (橋本 大輝, Hashimoto Daiki; born 7 August 2001) is a Japanese artistic gymnast. Widely regarded as the successor of Kohei Uchimura, he won two gold medals at the 2020 Summer Olympics, in all-around and horizontal bar, as well as a silver in team. His Tokyo individual gold medal win made him the youngest Olympic All-Around champion, at age 19 years, 355 days. At the world championships, he has also won 7 golds, 6 silvers, and 1 bronze.

Hashimoto became a member of the Japan men's national gymnastics team in 2019, while he was still studying at Funabashi Municipal High School. He has represented Japan in every major competition since then.

== Career ==
=== 2019 ===
Hashimoto competed at the World Championships in Stuttgart, Germany, where his team placed third all around. On the pommel horse, he finished in 9th place, and on the horizontal bar, he finished in 4th place.

=== 2021 ===
Hashimoto's breakthrough arrived when he became the national all-around champion. His score of 88.532 was the highest of 2021 until being surpassed by Zhang Boheng's 88.565 result at the Chinese Olympic Trials. One month later, Hashimoto participated in NHK Trophy, and despite only achieving the second highest score of the night, he still won the title because the tournament also used the scores of All Japan AA Championships for the final results. In June, Hashimoto achieved another victory at the All Japan Event Championships. With such impressive performances, he was later selected in Japan men's national gymnastics team competing at the Olympics.

At the Olympics, Hashimoto competed in team event with Kazuma Kaya, Takeru Kitazono, Wataru Tanigawa & won the silver with only 0.103 points behind the ROC team. He also won two gold medals in all-around and horizontal bar, making him the most successful male gymnast in Tokyo with three medals — two golds and one silver. Being just 10 days before turning 20, Hashimoto also became Japan's second youngest and one of only two teenage male gymnasts in history to accomplish that feat after Kenzō Shirai, who won team gold six days younger in 2016. This would also include by default Hashimoto becoming the youngest Japanese gymnast to win Olympic gold on the all-around and horizontal bar events. In the men's individual floor exercise and pommel horse event finals, Hashimoto would place eleventh and ninth.

At the 2021 World Championships in Kitakyushu, Hashimoto was the top qualifier on the men's individual all-around and horizontal bar, but only earned two silver medals on those events. He also placed fourth in the parallel bars, and withdrew from floor and pommel horse, despite qualifying for the finals.

=== 2022 ===
At the 2022 All-Japan all-around championships in late April, Hashimoto successfully defended his title, leading in both qualification & final. He also won the NHK Trophy, despite multiple falls in pommel horse & horizontal bar. In June, Hashimoto participated in All-Japan event championships, competing in floor, pommel horse, parallel bars & horizontal bar. He had previously qualified in rings but withdraw later. In floor , he won the bronze, while in pommel horse & horizontal bar finals, he made several falls & only achieved 7th & 6th place respectively. In parallel bars, he made mistakes at the qualification & did not advance to the final.

Later in late August, Hashimoto achieved the highest AA score of the year, getting 88.331 at the All-Japan Student Championships. He also won every gold & silver at every event.

Hashimoto was selected to represent Japan at the World Championships in Liverpool after winning the NHK Trophy. Despite a fall at the pommel horse in qualification, he still made it to AA, FX & HB finals. In men's team final, Japanese men made a few serious mistakes & ended up with the silver, losing the title to China. However, Hashimoto managed to win the all-around championship, reversing the 2021 result. He was also the runner-up in floor & horizontal bar, with only 0.033 & 0.100, respectively, behind the eventual champions.

Hashimoto and his teammates from Juntendo University failed to defend the title at the All-Japan Team Championships, where he made serious falls in his pommel horse and parallel bars routines, as well as underperformed in floor, vault and horizontal bar. His all-around score was only 81.364, the lowest since 2019.

=== 2023 ===
Hashimoto started the 2023 season with 2 gold and a silver at the 2023 DTB Pokal Stuttgart, where he won the Mixed Cup and horizontal bar events, while being the runner-up at Men's Team Challenge. Later in April, he successfully defended the All-Japan All-Around Championships crown and became the 10th male gymnast to win the title 3 times. In May, he also won the NHK Trophy for the third consecutive year, despite the falls on pommel horse and horizontal, as well as underperforming the floor exercise routine. At the All-Japan Event Championships in June, Hashimoto was set to compete in floor, pommel horse and horizontal bar. His rings and parallel bars scores at All-Japan All-Around Championships would have been enough to be qualified, but a change of qualification rule only allowed only top 8 in AA qualification and final nights, and the other spots would be determined at tryout round 3, in which he did not participate. In pommel horse, Hashimoto ranked 11th in qualification, while in floor and horizontal bar, he was qualified directly to the final as being World Championships runner-up, but withdrew from floor and fell off the high bar, resulted in ranking last.

At the Summer Universiade in August, Hashimoto delivered one of the best performed in his career, scoring 88.698 in men's team final and qualified for floor, pommel horse, parallel bars and horizontal bar finals. However, some mistakes from his teammates dragged Japan to 2nd place. During the AA final, Hashimoto, who ranked 1st in qualification, clashed his head as he fell from the pommel horse and was forced to withdraw from the rest of the competition. About 2 weeks after the incident, he recovered quickly to compete at the All-Japan Student Championships. Despite a fall on horizontal bar, he managed to win the team and all-around titles, as well as ranking 1st in vault & parallel bars.

Hashimoto participated in the World Championships with a rough start. Mistakes from pommel horse and vault routines made him only ranked 3rd in all-around qualification, and would not have been able to advance to final as the first 2 ranks were his teammates. However, as the team already had prior discussion, Kazuma Kaya gave up his spot to him. In men's team final, Hashimoto, together with Kenta Chiba, Kazuma Kaya, Kazuki Minami and Kaito Sugimoto won the gold for Japan for the 1st time since 2015. He later defended his World crown in all-around and won his first world championships gold medal in horizontal bar, with one of the best routines in his career. With this results, Hashimoto is now ranked among male gymnasts as 2nd most all-around gold medals and 3rd most all-around medals at the World Championships.

=== 2024 ===
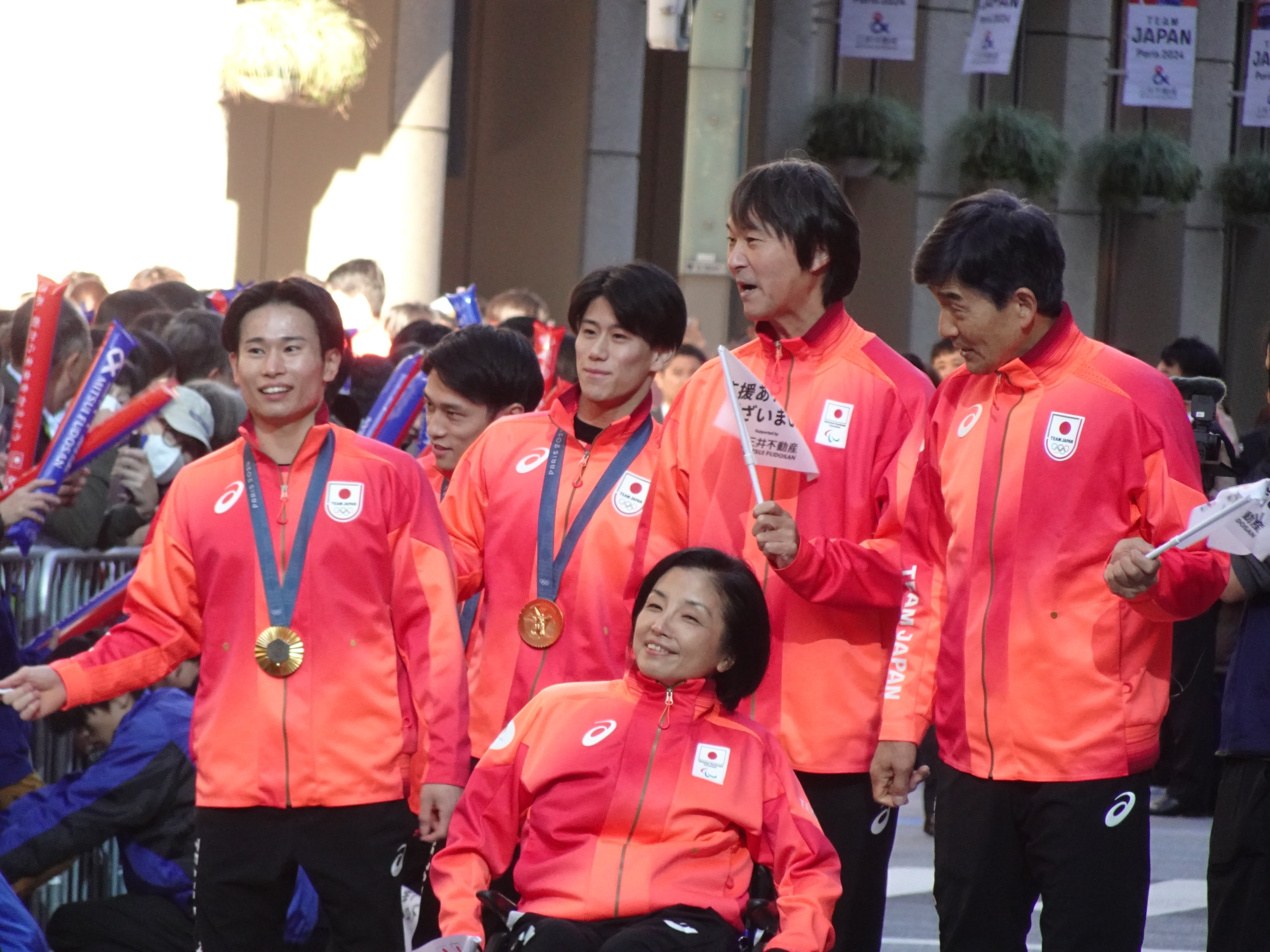
Hashimoto alongside other members of the 2024 Japanese Olympic and Paralympic delegation

Hashimoto represented Japan at the 2024 Summer Olympics in Paris, France alongside Tanigawa Wataru, Oka Shinnosuke, Kaya Kazuma, and Sugino Takaaki. During the qualification round Hashimoto helped Japan qualify to the team final in second behind China. Individually he only qualified to the all-around final, missing out on his chance to defend his Olympic horizontal bar title after dropping to his hands while dismounting the apparatus. During the team final Hashimoto helped Japan defeat their long-time rival China. During the individual all-around final Hashimoto fell off of the pommel horse and was unable to make up the score deficit, ending the competition in sixth place.

=== 2026 ===
At the 2026 Asian Games, he won a bronze medal for all-around and contributed to Japan's team silver. At the 2026 World Championships, Hashimoto led the Japanese team to win the team gold. He also won a gold for all-around.

== Competitive history ==
Competitive history of Daiki Hashimoto
Year	Event	Team	AA	FX	PH	SR	VT	PB	HB
2019	Valeri Liukin International Elite	1st place, gold medalist(s)	1st place, gold medalist(s)	5	1st place, gold medalist(s)	4	1st place, gold medalist(s)	4	1st place, gold medalist(s)
2019	National High School Selection Tournament		2nd place, silver medalist(s)	3rd place, bronze medalist(s)	1st place, gold medalist(s)	5	1st place, gold medalist(s)	2nd place, silver medalist(s)	9
2019	All-Japan Championships	6	7	6	3rd place, bronze medalist(s)				10
2019	NHK Trophy		6						
2019	National High School Championships	1st place, gold medalist(s)	2nd place, silver medalist(s)	25	1st place, gold medalist(s)	7	1st place, gold medalist(s)	4	2nd place, silver medalist(s)
2019	All-Japan Junior Championships	1st place, gold medalist(s)	1st place, gold medalist(s)	1st place, gold medalist(s)	1st place, gold medalist(s)		1st place, gold medalist(s)	2nd place, silver medalist(s)	2nd place, silver medalist(s)
2019	National Sports Festival - Junior Division	1st place, gold medalist(s)							
2019	World Championships	3rd place, bronze medalist(s)			9				4
2019	Japanese All-around Super Final		1st place, gold medalist(s)						
2019	Toyota International			2nd place, silver medalist(s)	1st place, gold medalist(s)		2nd place, silver medalist(s)		4
2020	American Cup		5						
2020	All-Japan Student Championships	1st place, gold medalist(s)	1st place, gold medalist(s)	5	1st place, gold medalist(s)		1st place, gold medalist(s)	8	3rd place, bronze medalist(s)
2020	All-Japan Championships		5	6					4
2021	All-Japan Championships	1st place, gold medalist(s)	1st place, gold medalist(s)	11				WD	1st place, gold medalist(s)
2021	NHK Trophy		1st place, gold medalist(s)						
2021	Olympic Games	2nd place, silver medalist(s)	1st place, gold medalist(s)						1st place, gold medalist(s)
2021	All-Japan Student Championships	1st place, gold medalist(s)	1st place, gold medalist(s)	4	2nd place, silver medalist(s)	3rd place, bronze medalist(s)		2nd place, silver medalist(s)	1st place, gold medalist(s)
2021	World Championships	—N/a	2nd place, silver medalist(s)	WD	WD			4	2nd place, silver medalist(s)
2022	All-Japan Championships	4	1st place, gold medalist(s)	3rd place, bronze medalist(s)	7	WD			6
2022	NHK Trophy		1st place, gold medalist(s)						
2022	All-Japan Student Championships	1st place, gold medalist(s)	1st place, gold medalist(s)	1st place, gold medalist(s)	1st place, gold medalist(s)	2nd place, silver medalist(s)	2nd place, silver medalist(s)	1st place, gold medalist(s)	1st place, gold medalist(s)
2022	World Championships	2nd place, silver medalist(s)	1st place, gold medalist(s)	2nd place, silver medalist(s)					2nd place, silver medalist(s)
2023	DTB Pokal Team Challenge	2nd place, silver medalist(s)	—N/a		WD				1st place, gold medalist(s)
2023	DTB Pokal Mixed Cup	1st place, gold medalist(s)							
2023	All-Japan Championships		1st place, gold medalist(s)	WD					8
2023	NHK Trophy		1st place, gold medalist(s)						
2023	World University Games	2nd place, silver medalist(s)	DNF	WD	WD			WD	WD
2023	All-Japan Student Championships	1st place, gold medalist(s)	1st place, gold medalist(s)	5	2nd place, silver medalist(s)	2nd place, silver medalist(s)	1st place, gold medalist(s)	1st place, gold medalist(s)	
2023	World Championships	1st place, gold medalist(s)	1st place, gold medalist(s)	7					1st place, gold medalist(s)
2024	All-Japan Championships		1st place, gold medalist(s)						
2024	Olympic Games	1st place, gold medalist(s)	6						
2024	All-Japan Event Championships			2nd place, silver medalist(s)	6				1st place, gold medalist(s)
2024	All-Japan Team Championships	2nd place, silver medalist(s)							
2025	All-Japan Championships		1st place, gold medalist(s)						
2025	NKH Trophy		2nd place, silver medalist(s)						
2025	World University Games	1st place, gold medalist(s)	1st place, gold medalist(s)		2nd place, silver medalist(s)				2nd place, silver medalist(s)
2025	World Championships	—N/a	1st place, gold medalist(s)		R3				2nd place, silver medalist(s)
2026	American Cup	3rd place, bronze medalist(s)							
2026	NHK Trophy		2nd place, silver medalist(s)						
2026	Asian Games	2nd place, silver medalist(s)	3rd place, bronze medalist(s)	6	3rd place, bronze medalist(s)				
2026	World Championships	1st place, gold medalist(s)	1st place, gold medalist(s)		8			4	

== Detailed results ==
=== 2017–2021 Code of Points ===
Year	Tournament	Event	Date	All Around	Floor (gymnastics)	Pommel horse	Rings (gymnastics)	Vault (gymnastics)	Parallel bars	Horizontal bar
2019	Valeri Liukin International Elite		2 February	86.000	14.000	14.750	14.250	14.850	13.850	14.300
2019	National High School Selection Tournament		24 March	83.750	14.100	14.450	13.250	14.900	14.100	12.950
2019	All-Japan All-around Championships	Qualification	26 April	83.931	13.766	14.166	13.166	14.600	14.133	14.100
2019	All-Japan All-around Championships	AA Final	28 April	84.031	13.800	14.300	12.966	14.566	14.166	14.233
2019	NHK Trophy		19 May	83.497	14.033	14.366	12.933	14.866	13.033	14.266
2019	All-Japan Events Championships	Qualification	22 June		14.266	14.500		15.000		13.966
2019	All-Japan Events Championships	Event Finals	23 June		13.833	14.400				
2019	National High School Championships	Qualification	30 July - 2 August	84.400	13.650	13.550	13.650	14.950	14.550	14.050
2019	National High School Championships	AA Final	30 July - 2 August	84.850	13.250	14.750	13.650	14.800	14.400	14.000
2019	All-Japan Junior Championships		17 August	84.450	14.300	14.500	12.500	14.800	14.300	14.000
2019	National Sports Festival - Junior Division	Qualification	13 September	85.750	14.200	14.500	13.650	14.900	14.250	14.250
2019	National Sports Festival - Junior Division	Team Final	15 September		14.550	13.500		14.800	14.100	14.550
2019	World Championships	Qualification	7 October		14.433	14.883		14.766		14.366
2019	World Championships	Team Final	9 October		13.533	14.466		14.900		14.066
2019	World Championships	Event Finals	12 - 13 October			13.333				14.233
2019	Japanese All-around Super Final		8 November	86.031	14.566	14.733	13.433	14.366	14.100	14.833
2019	All-Japan Team Championships		09 - 10 October		14.433	14.600		14.933	14.066	13.566
2019	Toyota International		14–15 December		14.066	15.033		13.366		14.133
2019	Toyota International		14–15 December		14.066	15.033		13.666		14.133
2020	2020 American Cup		7 March	82.757	13.666	13.400	13.900	13.500	14.066	14.225
2020	All-Japan Student Championships		19 - 23 October	87.450	14.600	15.250	13.850	15.150	14.100	14.500
2020	All-Japan Championships	Qualification	11 December	85.032	14.600	12.666	14.033	14.900	14.033	14.800
2020	All-Japan Championships	AA Final	13 December	86.432	14.700	13.900	13.933	14.900	14.366	14.633
2021	All-Japan All-around Championships	Qualification	16 April	84.833	14.800	12.700	12.900	15.233	14.700	14.500
2021	All-Japan All-around Championships	AA Final	18 April	88.532	15.000	14.466	13.900	15.000	15.166	15.000
2021	NHK Trophy		16 May	86.165	14.300	14.733	13.833	15.133	14.100	14.066
2021	All-Japan Events Championships	Qualification	5 June		14.466	13.633				14.766
2021	All-Japan Events Championships	Event Finals	6 June							15.133
2021	Olympic Games	Qualification	24 July	88.531	14.700	14.766	13.866	14.866	15.300	15.033
2021	Olympic Games	Team Final	26 July		14.600	14.800	13.833	14.833		15.100
2021	Olympic Games	AA Final	28 July	88.465	14.833	15.166	13.533	14.700	15.300	14.933
2021	Olympic Games	Event Finals	3 August							15.066
2021	All-Japan Student Championships		01 - 4 September	86.497	14.266	14.933	14.233	13.466	14.466	15.133
2021	World Championships	Qualification	20 October	88.040	14.733	15.075	13.333	15.066	15.200	14.633
2021	World Championships	AA Final	22 October	87.964	14.833	14.166	13.966	14.800	15.066	15.133
2021	World Championships	Event Finals	23 - 24 October						15.000	15.066
2021	All-Japan Team Championship		12 December		14.900	15.100		15.200	15.033	15.033

=== 2022–2024 Code of Points ===
Year	Tournament	Event	Date	AA	Floor (gymnastics)	Pommel horse	Rings (gymnastics)	Vault (gymnastics)	Parallel bars	Horizontal bar
2022	All-Japan All-around Championships	Qualification	22 April	85.864	14.733	14.466	14.166	14.700	13.266	14.533
2022	All-Japan All-around Championships	AA Final	24 April	87.797	14.366	14.166	14.133	14.966	14.733	15.433
2022	NHK Trophy		15 May	83.532	13.933	13.200	14.133	14.900	14.766	12.600
2022	All-Japan Events Championships	Qualification	18 June		14.600	14.033		14.000	13.100	
2022	All-Japan Events Championships	Event Finals	19 June		14.700	13.300				13.300
2022	All-Japan Student Championships		19–22 August	88.331	14.566	14.666	14.433	14.933	14.733	15.000
2022	World Championships	Qualification	30 October	84.665	14.466	11.666	14.000	14.700	14.733	15.100
2022	World Championships	Team Final	2 November		14.500	14.433	13.866	13.866		13.133
2022	World Championships	AA Final	4 November	87.198	14.666	14.333	13.866	14.900	15.000	14.433
2022	World Championships	Event Finals	5 - 6 November		14.500					14.700
2022	All-Japan Team Championships		11 December	81.364	13.866	11.600	14.133	14.266	12.866	14.633
2023	DTB Pokal Mixed Cup	Team/QF	17 March			14.600	14.100		4.300	14.700
2023	DTB Pokal Mixed Cup	Event Finals	18 March							14.500
2023	DTB Pokal Team Challenge		19 March			14.300				14.900
2023	All-Japan All-around Championships	Qualification	21 April	86.065	14.000	14.633	13.800	14.533	14.366	14.733
2023	All-Japan All-around Championships	AA Final	23 April	85.432	13.966	14.400	13.800	14.200	14.766	14.300
2023	NHK Trophy		21 May	84.098	13.966	13.066	14.133	14.833	14.900	13.200
2023	All-Japan Event Championships	Qualification	9 June			14.300				
2023	All-Japan Event Championships	Event Finals	10 June							12.300
2023	Summer Universiade	Team Final	2 August	88.698	14.700	15.033	14.333	14.766	14.600	15.266
2023	Summer Universiade	AA Final	4 August		12.233	12.966				
2023	All-Japan Student Championships		22 August	86.397	14.233	14.800	14.166	15.166	14.766	13.266
2023	World Championships	Qualification	30 September	85.432	14.500	13.266	13.700	14.366	14.600	15.000
2023	World Championships	Team Final	3 October		14.300	14.266		14.900	14.866	14.366
2023	World Championships	AA Final	5 October	86.132	13.466	14.366	14.000	15.000	14.800	14.500
2023	World Championships	Event Finals	7 - 8 October		14.233					15.233

== Personal life ==
Hashimoto was born in Narita, Japan. Demonstrating a natural talent for gymnastics from a young age, he received strong support from his parents in pursuing the sport. He trained during his early years and attended Funabashi Municipal High School, where he further developed his skills under professional coaching. In 2019, while still in high school, Hashimoto was selected to join the Japan men's national gymnastics team.

His two older brothers, Takuya and Kengo, who competed in artistic gymnastics at the club- and university-level in Japan, inspired Hashimoto to begin gymnastics at age seven at the Sawara Junior Club.

Hashimoto has received two awards. In 2019, he received the Excellence Award at the 2019 NHK Cup. In 2020, he was given the Road to 2020 Olympic Encouragement Award at the TV Asahi Big Sports Awards.

He is a student at Juntendo University, School of Health and Sports Science in Inzai, Chiba.

== See also ==
- List of multiple Olympic gold medalists at a single Games
- Japan men's national gymnastics team
