= Minori Haruki =

Japanese artistic gymnast

- Full name: 春木 三憲
- Born: 8 February 1999 (age 27)
- Height: 1.60 m (5 ft 3 in)

Gymnastics career
- Discipline: Men's artistic gymnastics
- Country represented: Japan
- College team: Nittaidai
- Club: Tokushukai
- Head coaches: Yuji Sano; Yuya Shintaku; Naoki Morichika
Medal record
Representing Japan
Asian Championships
Silver medal – second place	2019 Ulaanbaatar	Team

Minori Haruki (春木 三憲, Haruki Minori; born 8 February 1999) is a Japanese artistic gymnast. Born in Osaka, Japan, he graduated from Nippon Sport Science University & later joined Tokushukai Gymnastics Club. Haruki was part of Japan men's national gymnastics team that won the silver medal at the 2019 Asian Artistic Gymnastics Championships.

== Competitive history ==
Year	Event	Team	AA	FX	PH	SR	VT	PB	HB
2021	All Japan Championships	2nd place, silver medalist(s)	12		19	10			
2021	NHK Trophy	—N/a	12						
2021	All Japan Senior Championships	1st place, gold medalist(s)	9						

== Detailed Results ==
=== 2017-2020 Code of Points ===
Year	Tournament	Event	Date	All Around	Floor (gymnastics)	Pommel horse	Rings (gymnastics)	Vault (gymnastics)	Parallel bars	Horizontal bar
2021	All Japan Individual All-around Championships	Qualification	16 April	83.764	14.033	13.866	14.333	14.533	13.766	13.233
2021	All Japan Individual All-around Championships	AA Final	18 April	83.832	14.000	13.766	14.500	14.300	14.000	13.266
2021	NHK Trophy		16 May	83.297	14.133	13.366	14.300	14.566	13.766	13.166
2021	All Japan Individual Events Championships	Qualification	5 June			13.366	14.266			
2021	All Japan Senior Championships		23 - 26 September	83.832	14.200	13.666	14.733	14.633	13.700	12.900
2021	All Japan Team Championships		12 December				14.733	14.800		

== See also ==
- Japan men's national gymnastics team
