= Seisa University =

Private university in Japan

Coordinates: 43°27′34.7″N 142°9′59.1″E

Seisa University (星槎大学) is a private distance learning university with headquarters in Ashibetsu, Hokkaido, Japan, established in 2004. The predecessor of the school was founded in 1985.
