= Asahi Life =

Japanese insurance company

Asahi Mutual Life Insurance Company
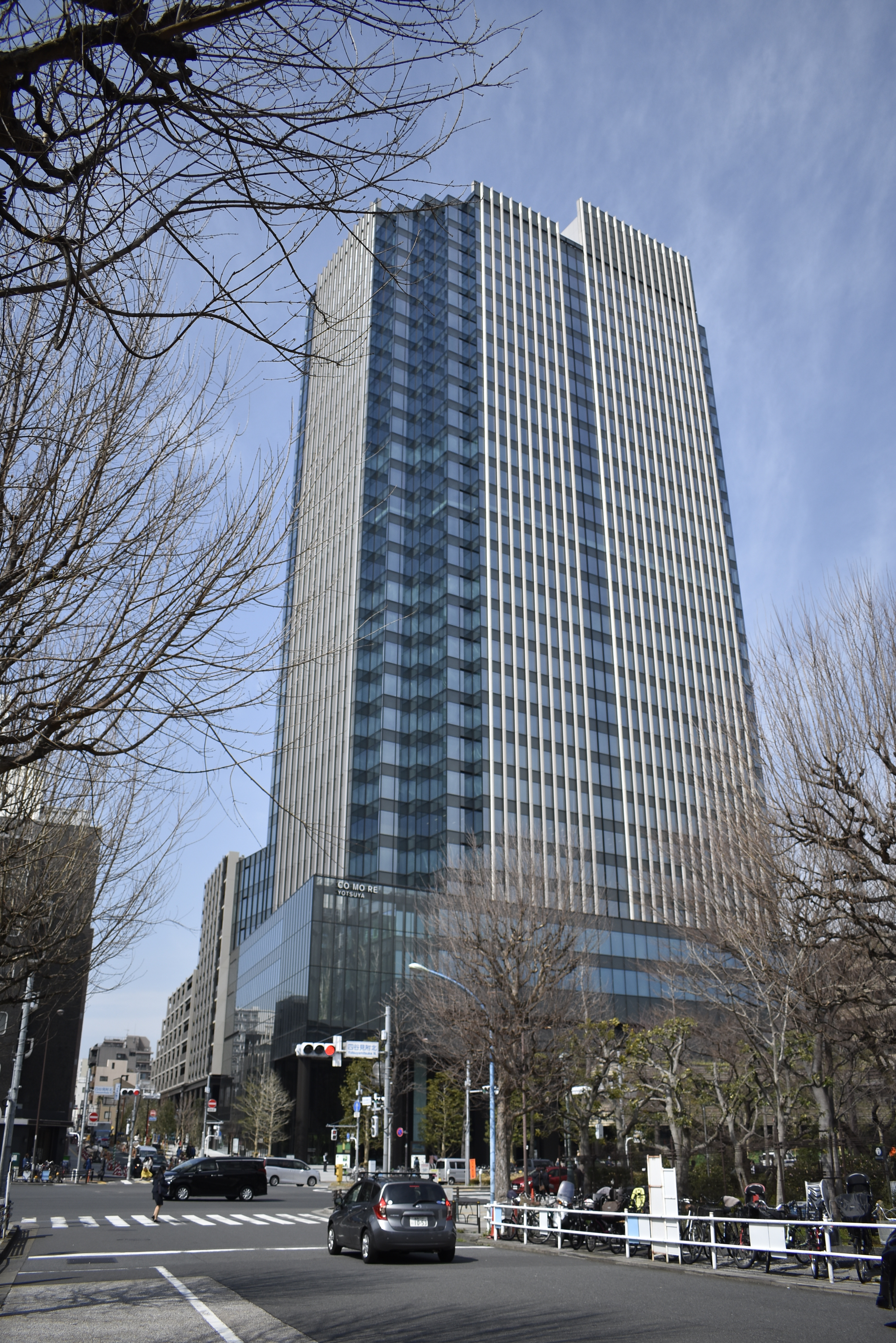
- Native name: 朝日生命保険相互会社
- Romanized name: Asahi Seimei Hoken Sōgo-kaisha
- Company type: Mutual
- Industry: Insurance
- Founded: March 1, 1888
- Headquarters: Shinjuku, Tokyo, Japan
- Number of employees: 18,183
- Website: asahi-life.co.jp

Asahi Mutual Life Insurance Company (朝日生命保険相互会社, Asahi Seimei Hoken Sōgo-kaisha) is a Japanese insurance company, headquartered in Tokyo. The company was founded in 1888 and is, today, one of the oldest and largest insurers in Japan.

Asahi Mutual Life Insurance is a member of the Mizuho keiretsu.
