= Marisa Kwiatkowski =

American journalist and investigative reporter

- Born: Marisa Kwiatkowski
- Citizenship: United States
- Education: Grand Valley State University; Kelley School of Business
- Occupations: Editor; Investigative Reporter
- Years active: 2005 - present
- Employer: Knight Foundation
- Known for: USA Gymnastics sex abuse scandal Athlete A
- Awards: Louis M. Lyons Award for Conscience and Integrity in Journalism

Marisa Kwiatkowski is an American journalist and former investigative reporter at USA Today, known for her reporting of the USA Gymnastics' sexual abuse scandal. As of July 2024, she is a director of journalism programs at the Knight Foundation.

== Life and career ==
Kwiatkowski holds an undergraduate degree from Grand Valley State University (B.A., 2005) and began her career in Michigan at the Grand Haven Tribune.

From 2013 to 2019, Kwiatkowski worked as a reporter at The Indianapolis Star. She reported on a variety of investigative stories focused on victims of assault and harassment. During this time, Kwiatkowski completed a night-time masters of business administration degree program at Indiana University.

In 2019, she joined USA Today as an investigative reporter based in Indianapolis.

In 2020, Kwiatkowski and colleague Tricia Nadolny broke the story that USA Cheer, the governing body of American cheer-leading, knowingly allowed convicted sex offenders to own and operate cheer-leading gyms and otherwise continue to be involved in the sport.

=== USA Gymnastics sex abuse scandal ===
While at the Star, Kwiatkowski worked on the "Out of Balance" series, which turned into an investigation about how the USA Gymnastics organization failed to report many allegations of sexual abuse by coaches. The reporting began in 2016, initially looking at Indiana-based assaults that were not reported to authorities. The reporting grew in scope and showed how predators exploited a lax culture to prey on children. As a result of the series, more than 500 women came forward with allegations of sexual abuse against Larry Nassar, a team physician who worked in four Olympic games.

The Star's reporting exposed Nassar as a serial abuser. He was sentenced to 175 years in prison in January 2018 after pleading guilty to sexually abusing seven girls and the CEO of board of directors of USA Gymnastics resigned. The Star's investigative series also led to the drafting and passage of the Protecting Young Victims from Sexual Abuse and Safe Sport Authorization Act of 2017, which was signed into law by President Trump.

== Later career ==
In July 2024, Kwiatkowski became a director of journalism programs at the Knight Foundation.
