= Béla Károlyi =

Romanian-American gymnastics coach (1942–2024)

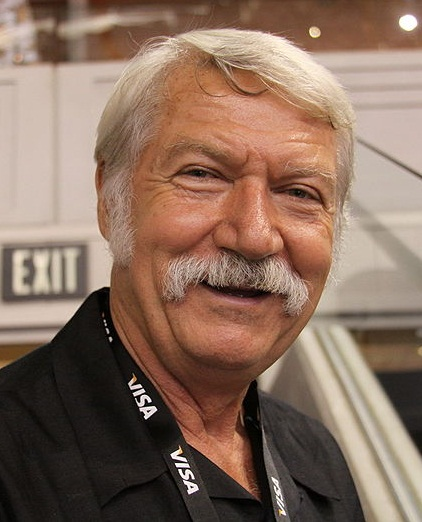
- Károlyi in 2009
- Born: September 13, 1942; Kolozsvár, Hungary (now Cluj-Napoca, Romania)
- Died: November 15, 2024 (aged 82); Houston, Texas, USA
- Citizenship: Romania; United States
- Education: Romania College of Physical Ed.
- Occupation: Gymnastics coach
- Years active: c. 1956–1997
- Employers: Romanian Gymnastics Federation; U.S. Gymnastics Federation
- Known for: Romanian centralized gymnastics training system; Coach to European, World and Olympic gymnasts
- Spouse: Márta Erőss (m. 1963)
- Children: Andrea Wise

Béla Károlyi (Hungarian: [ˈbeːlɒ ˈkaːroji]; September 13, 1942 – November 15, 2024) was a Romanian and American gymnastics coach of Hungarian descent. Early in his coaching career he developed the Romanian centralized training system for gymnastics. One of his earliest protégés was Nadia Comăneci, the first Olympic Games gymnast to be awarded a perfect score. Living under the dictatorship of Nicolae Ceaușescu, Károlyi frequently clashed with Romanian officials. He and his wife defected to the United States in 1981.

After their arrival in the United States, Béla and his wife Márta Károlyi were credited with transforming the coaching of gymnastics in the U.S. and bringing major international success. They were coaches for the United States women's national gymnastics team, as well as national team coordinators for United States gymnastics at the Olympic Games. They were severely criticized for their coaching style, which many gymnasts have called abusive. They claimed to have been unaware that Larry Nassar, the national gymnastics team doctor who was convicted of sexual assault of minors, was assaulting young female gymnasts in their care at their Károlyi Ranch training facility in the Sam Houston National Forest in Texas. Athlete A, a documentary about the scandal, is a 2020 film which covers the Karolyis and their ranch.

Károlyi coached many notable national, European, Olympic gymnasts as well as those from the World Gymnastics Championships including Nadia Comăneci, Ecaterina Szabo, Mary Lou Retton, Julianne McNamara, Betty Okino, Teodora Ungureanu, Kim Zmeskal, Kristie Phillips, Dominique Moceanu, Phoebe Mills, and Kerri Strug. He coached nine Olympic champions, fifteen world champions, sixteen European medalists, and six U.S. national champions. He was inducted into the International Gymnastics Hall of Fame in 1997. Béla and Márta Károlyi as a coaching team were inducted into the US Gymnastics Hall of Fame in 2000.

== Early life, family and education ==
Károlyi was born in Kolozsvár, Hungary (now Cluj-Napoca, Romania), into an ethnic Hungarian family. Skilled as an athlete, he became a national junior boxing champion and a member of the Romanian hammer throwing team. He enrolled at the Romania College of Physical Education, studying and practicing gymnastics after having had trouble with a mandatory skills test in the sport.

== Early coaching career ==
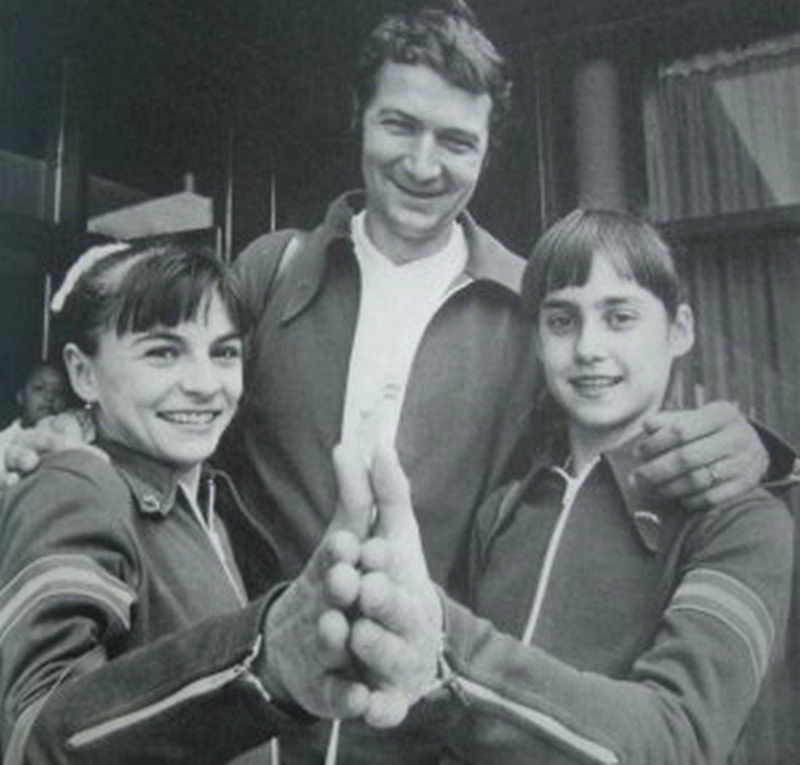
Left–right: Ungureanu, Károlyi, Comăneci

During his senior year at the college, Károlyi coached the women's gymnastics team, whose star was Márta Erőss. They later started a relationship and married in 1963. They moved to a small town in the coal-mining region where Béla had grown up, where they started a gymnastics class at the town's elementary school. Later the government invited them to create a national school for gymnastics.

Romania's famed centralized training program has its roots in the 1950s; Bela Károlyi helped develop the program further in the late 1960s and early 1970s. He worked as a coach at the boarding school in Gheorghe Gheorghiu-Dej (now named Oneşti), training young girls specially chosen for their athletic potential. One of the first students at the school was six-year-old Nadia Comăneci, who lived near the town and commuted from home.

Károlyi debuted as an international coach in 1974. He had to persuade the Romanian gymnastics federation to have Comăneci and his other athletes named to the 1975 European Championships and the 1976 Olympic team, because the federation favored athletes from the competing Dinamo club in Bucharest. At the 1976 Summer Olympics in Montreal, Canada, he was the head coach of the Romanian squad; most of the members of the team were Gheorghe Gheorghiu-Dej athletes. The team earned the silver medal. Comăneci was one of the outstanding performers of the Games, scoring the first-ever perfect 10 in Olympic competition. Altogether, they won seven medals in Montréal: three gold, two silver, and two bronze. After Comăneci's astounding success in Montreal, Károlyi's importance as a coach was recognized. He was named head coach of the Romanian team at the 1980 Olympics in Moscow, USSR.

== 1980s ==
In 1980 Károlyi began to clash with Romanian Federation officials, in part because of his score protests at the 1980 Olympics and at several other international competitions that year. During a 1981 gymnastics tour, the Károlyis and Romanian team choreographer Géza Pozsár defected and sought political asylum in the US. Having temporarily left their seven-year-old daughter Andrea with relatives in Romania, the Károlyis settled in Texas.

In 1981, Károlyi invested in a gymnastics venture at the invitation of a group of local businessmen and the Károlyis moved to Houston. When the gym later ran into financial problems, Károlyi bought it. His status as "Nadia's coach" quickly attracted gymnasts to the club.

He attended the 1984 Olympics as the personal coach of Mary Lou Retton, who was crowned the all-around champion, and Julianne McNamara, who won the gold medal in the uneven bars. Without an official position with the American delegation, Károlyi slept in his car, and also held supplementary workouts for his gymnasts, against the wishes of national coach Don Peters. To skirt Olympic rules prohibiting personal coaches on the competition floor, Károlyi obtained a maintenance man's pass, which got him close enough to Retton and McNamara to speak with them during the competition. ABC television network captured this and commented on the controversy during its broadcasts.

Károlyi's clout in the United States increased in the wake of the 1984 Olympics, but so did resentment against him. After Retton's success in 1984, Károlyi purchased the Károlyi Ranch. He was paid by McDonald's to have their golden arch logo as part of his sleeve design on his outfit. His new gym, run from the ranch, attracted many of the country's top gymnasts.

After the 1984 Olympics, USGF replaced Don Peters with Greg Marsden as Olympic coach. Marsden was a college coach with no private students and no financial interest in promoting one gymnast at the expense of another. Marsden said that he "thought some of the concerns the other coaches had about Károlyi were legitimate;" Marsden picked Donna Cozzo as his assistant national coach. Károlyi was furious and had to be dissuaded from boycotting the 1987 Pan American Games. He did not attend the meet, complaining that he was not allowed to coach although he was "providing fifty percent of the team". Károlyi's star gymnast Kristie Phillips finished second behind Sabrina Mar, who trained with former Olympic coach Don Peters at SCATS gym in Huntington Beach, California.

The United States did not do well in the 1987 World Championships, finishing 6th. After Marsden resigned from his position as national team coach in November 1987, Károlyi lobbied to be appointed national coach, but he was opposed by the other coaches. Don Peters was restored to the position in January 1988. Peters chose Béla's wife Márta Károlyi to serve as assistant national coach. Béla Károlyi told the United States Gymnastics Federation that he would not attend the 1988 Seoul Olympic Games unless he was the team coach.

At the 1988 Olympic Trials in August, Károlyi's gymnasts earned 5 of the top 8 spots. The five gymnasts were Phoebe Mills, Brandy Johnson, Chelle Stack, and the two team alternates Rhonda Faehn and Kristie Phillips. Phillips, who had left Károlyi's gym and trained with Peters for a short time following her disappointing performance at the 1987 World Championships, said that Peters' workouts were "not half as intense (as Károlyi's)". Phillips told reporters it would hurt the national team if they had to leave Károlyi's gym and train with Peters at SCATS. USGF executive director Mike Jacki said, "The women's coaches are all private businessmen... The more kids you put on the team, the better it is for your business."

Peters resigned as national coach after the trials. After Peters' resignation, the USGF decided against having a national team coach and allowed personal coaches to accompany the gymnasts to competitions. The U.S. Olympic team finished fourth in Seoul. East German gymnastic official Ellen Berger raised a valid objection, since a U.S. team member had violated one of the obscure competition rules. After the springboard had been used at the start of another gymnast's uneven bars routine, the U.S. alternate, Rhonda Faehn, had pulled it away but had stayed on the podium to watch, instead of stepping off again immediately, as required by the rule. Had Faehn stepped off the podium, the US team would have won the bronze medal. Because of this small points deduction, the East German team overtook the American team and won the bronze medal. An incensed Károlyi said the rule was invoked in order to "keep the scores down" because the East German team was "fighting desperately to keep their place". The obscure rule goes on to say that no assistance can be given during a performance. It did not specifically mention athletes on the podium. A jury dominated by Soviet Bloc officials voted to maintain the deduction. Despite the fact that the U.S. team had indeed committed an infraction, he said that application of the scoring penalty was "dirty cheating". A photograph of Károlyi embracing and consoling the disappointed American girls appeared in most U.S. newspapers the following day.

After the 1988 Olympics, Károlyi's sphere of influence continued to grow as did the number of elite gymnasts training in his gym. At one meet in 1990, a journalist dubbed six top Károlyi gymnasts the "Károlyi six-pack." Although the members of the six-pack would change, the name stuck and increased Károlyi's prominence in the sport.

== 1990s ==
At the 1991 World Championships, four of the six athletes on the U.S. women's team—Kim Zmeskal, Betty Okino, Hilary Grivich, and Kerri Strug—were trained by Károlyi; the other two (alternates) Shannon Miller and Michelle Campi, were trained by ex-Károlyi club coaches. The situation was nearly repeated at the 1992 Olympics, where Károlyi was head coach and five members of the seven-gymnast squad (six competitors and one alternate) were either trained by him or one of his protégés.

Károlyi primarily was a personal coach for Dominique Moceanu and Kerri Strug at the 1996 Olympics, but he still managed to draw the spotlight. After Strug injured her ankle on her first vault Károlyi encouraged her, "Shake it off! You can do it!". After Strug's successful final vault, Károlyi carried the injured Strug to the podium to accept her gold medal. The moment was photographed and one of the most memorable from the Olympics.

Károlyi retired from coaching after the 1996 Olympics. He and Márta went to their ranch and gymnastics camp in New Waverly, Texas. In 1997, Béla was inducted into the International Gymnastics Hall of Fame.

== 1999–2000 ==
After the success of the U.S. team, dubbed the "Magnificent Seven," at the 1996 Olympics, USA Gymnastics experienced a lull. A new requirement that competitors be at least 16 years old in the calendar year of the competition (up from the previous 15) kept some top gymnasts out of the World Championships in 1997. While American gymnasts did win medals in international competitions such as the Goodwill Games and the Pacific Alliance Championships, they were largely unsuccessful in most major meets. In both 1997 and 1999, the American team left the World Championships without a single medal.

After the 1999 World Championships, USA Gymnastics tried to revamp its program by hiring Károlyi as national team coordinator. Károlyi required that all national team members attend frequent, grueling camps at his ranch north of Houston. Some observers believed that selection procedures for international meets became more arbitrary. Coaches resented what they felt was Károlyi's intrusion onto their domain, and athletes were under a considerable amount of stress. The tension escalated to the point where gymnasts were openly speaking out against Károlyi. At the 2000 Olympics, the US team originally placed fourth, but the Chinese team had an underage athlete, so the US team was ultimately awarded the bronze in 2010.

In 2001, Márta Károlyi was selected for the national team coordinator position. While she retained some aspects of her husband's program, such as the training camp system, she reduced the frequency of the camps. Her different approach met with more acceptance by both coaches and gymnasts. Between 2001 and 2007, American women won a combined total of 34 medals in World Championship and Olympic competition. Between 2001 and 2016, they won five World Championships team titles (2003, 2007, 2011, 2014, and 2015) and two Olympic team titles (2012, 2016). Additionally, the team won four consecutive Olympic all-around titles (2004, 2008, 2012, and 2016), eight World Championships all-around titles (2005, 2007, 2009, 2011, 2013, 2014, 2015, and 2017), and eighteen individual event World Championships titles.

== Later career ==
Márta Károlyi remained the national team coordinator for USA Gymnastics until 2016. During the 2008 Summer Olympics, Béla Károlyi appeared as a guest commentator for NBC News. He claimed that the Chinese women's gymnastics team was cheating by using athletes who did not meet the minimum age requirement. He and his wife said, "They are using half-people. One of the biggest frustrations is, what arrogance. These people think we are stupid." Károlyi said that he disagreed with the age limit. He called for it to be abolished by the International Olympic Committee. He said that if a gymnast was good enough to earn a spot at the Olympics or World Championships, he or she deserves to go. He objected to the possibility that they were being used by their government. "They do good gymnastics and are a good service for the sport," he said. "They have the ultimate effective training program. That’s why I am more upset that they are cheating. They don’t need cheating. They would be just as good with a lineup of eligible athletes."

== Controversy ==
Several of Károlyi's athletes from the "six-pack" era have criticized his training methods. Some of his former athletes including Kristie Phillips, Dominique Moceanu, and Erica Stokes have publicly said that Károlyi was verbally and psychologically abusive during workouts. Károlyi's constant critical remarks about weight and body type were said to drive some gymnasts to develop eating disorders and low self-esteem. Some gymnasts, such as Phillips, Moceanu, and 1988 Olympian Chelle Stack also said that they were compelled to continue training and competing even when coping with serious injuries such as broken bones. In one interview, Moceanu (one of Károlyi's final protégés) said, "I'm sure Béla saw injuries, but if you were injured, Béla didn't want to see it.... You had to deal with it." Károlyi also was said to strictly monitor his gymnasts' food intake: Moceanu, for instance, stated that at meets away from home, gymnasts were limited to consuming as few as 900 calories a day. Even Károlyi's supporters have admitted that at certain competitions, his gymnasts ate so sparingly that members of the men's gymnastics team smuggled food to them in their hotel rooms.

However, many of Károlyi's most prominent gymnasts have vehemently defended him against these allegations. Nadia Comăneci, in her 2004 memoir Letters to a Young Gymnast, remarked that she trusted Károlyi with her life. She also stated that in Romania, the gymnasts at Károlyi's school consumed well-balanced diets and, in fact, ate better than most other civilians in the country at the time. Olympic medalists and Károlyi gymnasts Mary Lou Retton, Phoebe Mills and Kim Zmeskal among others, have also praised Károlyi and his training regimen.

A number of former Károlyi gymnasts, both supporters and detractors, have acknowledged that some of the allegations about Károlyi were true, but they have also claimed that the ends—medals—justified the means. In Joan Ryan's 1995 Little Girls in Pretty Boxes, 1992 Olympian Betty Okino said: "What Béla did worked. He motivated me by getting me mad." Some have claimed that Károlyi stopped treating gymnasts harshly when parents directly requested that he do so. In a column she wrote rebutting many of the claims of Little Girls in Pretty Boxes, Okino wrote, "Károlyi structured his training in a way that built your physical and mental strength to such a remarkable level that even he couldn't tear you down. Béla wanted to know that when push came to shove, his athletes could handle any situation thrown at them."

In an interview in the edition of December 8, 2007, of the Romanian newspaper Evenimentul Zilei, Adrian Goreac, the coach of the Romanian national gymnastics team from 1981 to 1990, after Károlyi left, spoke of Károlyi's "dictatorial regime" during his time coaching the Romanian gymnastics team.

In November 2008, Emilia Eberle, a Romanian national team member during the Károlyi coaching era, gave an interview to KCRA-TV in Sacramento, California, claiming that while she was on the national team, both Béla and Márta Károlyi regularly beat her and her teammates for mistakes they made in practice or competition. "In one word, I can say it was brutal," she told KCRA. Other Romanian team members including Ecaterina Szabo and Rodica Dunca, as well as Géza Pozsár, the team choreographer who defected with the Károlyis, have made similar charges of physical abuse. When asked in 2008 to comment on the allegations, Béla said, "I ignore it. I'm not even commenting. These people are really trash."

=== Role in sexual abuse scandal ===
While Károlyi has not been implicated in the USA Gymnastics sex abuse scandal which was reported beginning in 2016, gymnasts said that many instances of sexual abuse perpetrated by former team doctor Larry Nassar occurred at the Károlyi Ranch. Nassar reportedly groomed athletes for abuse and gained their trust in part by covertly providing them with food in defiance of Károlyi's strict dietary guidelines. Some gymnasts also said that the strict discipline and conditions at the ranch made them feel inhibited from reporting Nassar's abuses. As a result of the scandal, in July 2017 USA Gymnastics canceled its plans to buy Károlyi Ranch. In January 2018 USA Gymnastics announced they were cutting ties with Károlyi Ranch altogether.

== Later life and death ==
Károlyi died on November 15, 2024, at the age of 82. In the years prior to his death, he and his wife had disappeared from the public eye in the wake of the USA Gymnastics scandal, with some speculating that they had returned to their native Romania.

== Books ==
- Károlyi, Béla; Richardson, Nancy Ann (1994). Feel No Fear: The Power, Passion, and Politics of a Life in Gymnastics. Hyperion. ISBN 0-7868-6012-X.
- Ryan, Joan (2000). Little Girls in Pretty Boxes. Grand Central Publishing. ISBN 0446676829.
- Móra, László (2016). Károlyi Béla – Dikta-torna. Budapest. ISBN 978-615-80135-9-8.
- Olaru, Stejărel (2021). Nadia și Securitatea. Bucarest. ISBN 978-606-95197-0-7.

== Television ==
Béla Károlyi was in the episode "At the Edge of the Worlds", in the ABC Family series Make It or Break It. He portrayed Coach Sasha Belov's father.
