= Márta Károlyi =

Hungarian-Romanian-American gymnastics coach

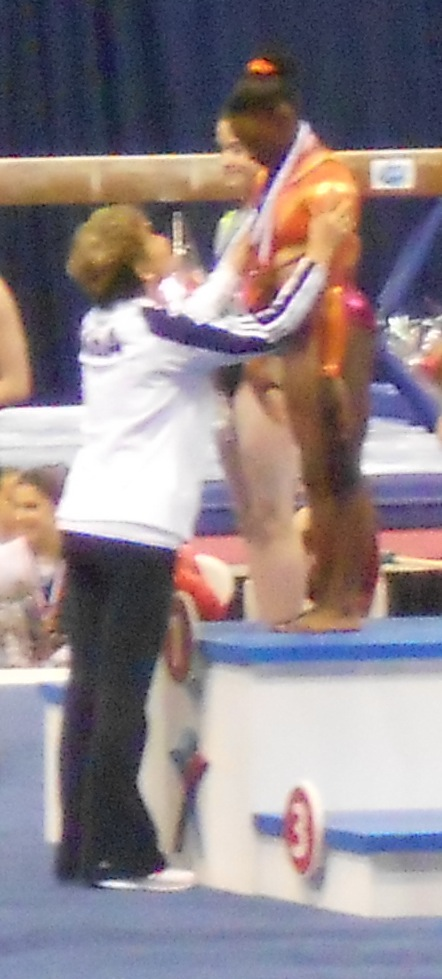
- Simone Biles receiving medal from Károlyi in 2012
- Born: Márta Erőss; August 29, 1942 (age 84); Székelyudvarhely, Kingdom of Hungary (now Odorheiu Secuiesc, Romania)
- Citizenship: Romania; United States
- Occupation: Gymnastics coach
- Known for: Romanian centralized gymnastics training system and coach to many world champions in Romania and U.S.
- Spouse: Béla Károlyi (m. 1963; died 2024)
- Children: Andrea Károlyi Wise
- Parent(s): Júlia Bálint, Ernő Erőss

Márta Károlyi (Hungarian: [ˈmaːrtɒ ˈkaːroji]; née Erőss; born August 29, 1942) is a Romanian-American gymnastics coach and the former national team coordinator for USA Gymnastics. She and her late husband, Béla, are ethnic Hungarians from Transylvania, Romania, who trained athletes in Romania, including Nadia Comăneci, before defecting to the United States in 1981. Béla and Márta Károlyi have trained nine Olympic champions, fifteen world champions, sixteen European medalists and many U.S. national champions, including Comăneci, Mary Lou Retton, Betty Okino, Kerri Strug, Teodora Ungureanu, Phoebe Mills, Kim Zmeskal, and Dominique Moceanu.

== Romania ==
Romania's famed centralized training program has its roots in the 1950s; the Károlyis helped develop the program further in the late 1960s and early 1970s. They established a boarding school in Oneşti, training young girls specially chosen for their athletic potential. One of the first students at the Károlyis' school was six-year-old Nadia Comăneci, who lived near Oneşti and commuted from home.

While Béla became a highly visible figure in Romanian gymnastics, accompanying the team to major competitions and often clashing with officials in the sport, Márta remained in the background, coaching and choreographing routines for some of the team's gymnasts.

In 1981, the Károlyis, along with fellow Hungarian-Romanian team choreographer Géza Pozsár, defected during a gymnastics tour in the United States. They were granted asylum and settled in Oklahoma. The couple's daughter, Andrea, joined them later.

== 1980s and 1990s ==
After their defection, the Károlyis established a gym in Houston, Texas. Béla's status as "Nadia's coach" quickly attracted gymnasts to the club, and by the late 1980s, the Károlyi gym had become the preeminent training facility in the United States. By 1990, Károlyi gymnasts were so dominant at national United States meets that journalists dubbed the top cluster of athletes the "Károlyi six-pack". At the 1991 World Championships, every single gymnast on the American squad was either a Károlyi athlete or trained by a former Károlyi club coach.

Márta Károlyi has avoided most of the controversy and accusations of abusive coaching that have trailed her husband, opting for a quieter, less abrasive approach. In the Károlyi coaching team, Béla was often known as the "motivator," while Márta was the "technician," applying her gymnastics savvy to help her athletes learn and perfect their technique, mechanics, and form. Béla accompanied the gymnasts to meets and was a highly visible presence to both the gymnastics community and the media; Márta remained in the background.

In 1996, Márta was chosen as the head coach of the U.S. women's team for the 1996 Olympics.

== U.S. National Team Coordinator ==
After the 1996 Olympics, the Károlyis retired from coaching. However, three years later, Béla returned to the public eye when he was named the national team coordinator for the U.S. women's gymnastics team. His approach was protested and resisted by both the national-team gymnasts and their coaches, who, by the 2000 Olympics, were so frustrated and unhappy that they spoke about the situation publicly.

In 2001, on the recommendation of the U.S. national team coaches, the position was handed over to Márta. While she maintained some aspects of Béla's original program, her approach was different, and generally more acceptable to the gymnasts and their coaches. It also yielded impressive competitive results: between 2001 and 2008, American women won a combined total of 44 medals in World Championship and Olympic competition.

As coordinator, Márta oversaw all aspects of the women's national team. Among her duties were selecting athletes for competitions, determining apparatus lineups at the meets, and making recommendations about skills and routine compositions. The Károlyis' daughter, Andrea, was the nutritionist for the team.

At the 2012 Olympics, after Aly Raisman was given a score of 14.966 in the balance beam final, which put her a tenth of a point behind Cătălina Ponor of Romania, Károlyi requested a video review. As a result of the review, Raisman was awarded an additional tenth of a point for difficulty, allowing her to win the bronze medal on a tie breaker.

She retired from coaching in 2016, after the Olympics at which the US Women Gymnastics Team won nine medals (four gold, four silver, one bronze). Her last group of gymnasts called themselves the Final Five because that was Márta's last Olympics. Valeri Liukin was named as her replacement on 16 September 2016.

In 2021, the Karolyi ranch was sold to a lumber company. The Karolyis retreated from the public eye after the USA Gymnastics sex abuse scandal and their whereabouts are unknown, with some speculating that they returned to Romania.

Her husband Béla died on November 15, 2024, at the age of 82.

== Controversy ==
In November 2008, Emilia Eberle, a Romanian national team member during the Károlyi coaching era, gave an interview to KCRA-TV in Sacramento, California, claiming that while she was on the team, both Béla and Márta regularly beat her and her teammates for mistakes they made in practice or competition. "In one word, I can say it was brutal", she told KCRA. Other Romanian team members, including Ecaterina Szabo and Rodica Dunca, as well as Géza Pozsár, the Romanian team choreographer who defected with the Károlyis, have made similar charges of physical abuse. When asked in 2008 to comment on the allegations, Béla Károlyi said: "I ignore it. I'm not even commenting. These people are really trash."

On October 28, 2016, a sex abuse lawsuit was filed by a former member gymnast against USA Gymnastics including the Károlyis, alleging they turned a blind eye to molestations by the team doctor Larry Nassar. The former member claims Nassar repeatedly sexually abused her when she was on the national team from 2006–11.

In January 2018, USA Gymnastics terminated its lease of the Károlyi owned gymnastics training center Karolyi Ranch during the sentencing phase of the trial of Nassar, who was found guilty of numerous acts of sexual assault against young gymnasts, many of which took place at the facility, where parents were not allowed to be present. A lawsuit was filed against the Károlyis in 2016 alleging that they had known about and "turned a blind-eye to the sexual abuse".

On January 25, 2018, the Ranch announced the permanent closure of the facility on its website. The Karolyis and their ranch are central figures in 2020 film, Athlete A - a documentary about the scandal. On January 30, 2018, the Texas Ranger Division took over the criminal investigation of the ranch.

== Bibliography ==
- Ryan, Joan. Little Girls in Pretty Boxes. Doubleday, New York, 1995. ISBN 0-385-47790-2.
- Comaneci, Nadia. Letters To A Young Gymnast. Basic Books, New York, 2003. ISBN 0-465-01276-0.
