= Mary Lou Retton =

American gymnast (born 1968)

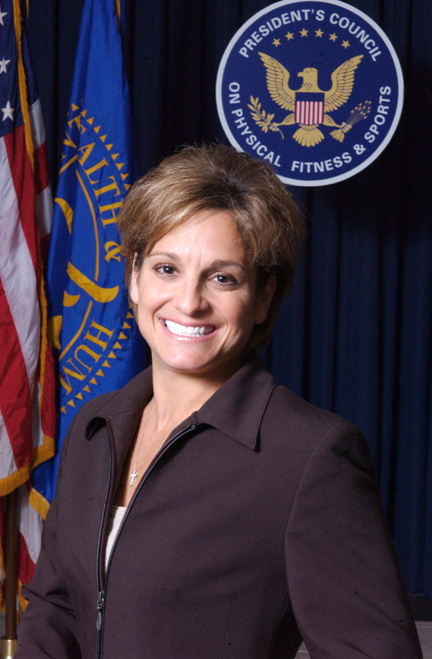
- Retton as a member of the President's Council on Physical Fitness and Sports, 2004

Personal information
- Nickname: America's Sweetheart
- Born: January 24, 1968 (age 58) Fairmont, West Virginia, U.S.
- Height: 4 ft 9 in (145 cm)

Gymnastics career
- Discipline: Women's artistic gymnastics
- Country represented: United States
- Club: Karolyi Gym
- Former coaches: Bela Károlyi, Márta Károlyi
- Retired: September 29, 1986
Medal record
Event	1st	2nd	3rd
Olympic Games	1	2	2
American Cup	3	0	0
Total	4	2	2
Women's artistic gymnastics
Representing United States
Olympic Games
Gold medal – first place	1984 Los Angeles	All-around
Silver medal – second place	1984 Los Angeles	Team
Silver medal – second place	1984 Los Angeles	Vault
Bronze medal – third place	1984 Los Angeles	Uneven bars
Bronze medal – third place	1984 Los Angeles	Floor exercise
American Cup
Gold medal – first place	1983 New York	All-around
Gold medal – first place	1984 New York	All-around
Gold medal – first place	1985 Indianapolis	All-around

Mary Lou Retton (born January 24, 1968) is an American retired gymnast. At the 1984 Summer Olympics in Los Angeles, she won a gold medal in the individual all-around competition, as well as two silver medals and two bronze medals, which earned her the Sports Illustrated Sportswoman of the Year award.

Retton's performance made her one of the most popular athletes in the United States. Her gold medal win was historic as Retton was the first American woman to win the all-around gold medal in Olympic gymnastics.

== Early life ==
Mary Lou Retton was born on January 24, 1968, in Fairmont, West Virginia. Her father, Ronnie, operated a coal-industry transportation equipment business. She attended Fairmont Senior High School, but did not graduate. She competed in the 1984 Olympic Games in Los Angeles, California, during her sophomore year of high school.

== Gymnastics career ==
When Retton was eight years old she was inspired by watching Nadia Comăneci outshine defending Olympic two-event winner Olga Korbut on television at the 1976 Summer Olympics in Montreal, and she took up gymnastics in her hometown of Fairmont, West Virginia. She was coached by Gary Rafaloski. Her parents then decided to move the family to Houston, Texas, so that she could train under Romanians Béla and Márta Károlyi, who had coached Nadia Comăneci before their defection to the United States. Under the Károlyis, Retton soon began to make a name for herself in the U.S., winning the American Cup in 1983 and placing second to Dianne Durham (another Károlyi student) at the US Nationals that same year. Though Retton missed the World Gymnastics Championships in 1983 due to a wrist injury, she won the American Classic in 1983 and 1984, as well as Japan's Chunichi Cup in 1983.

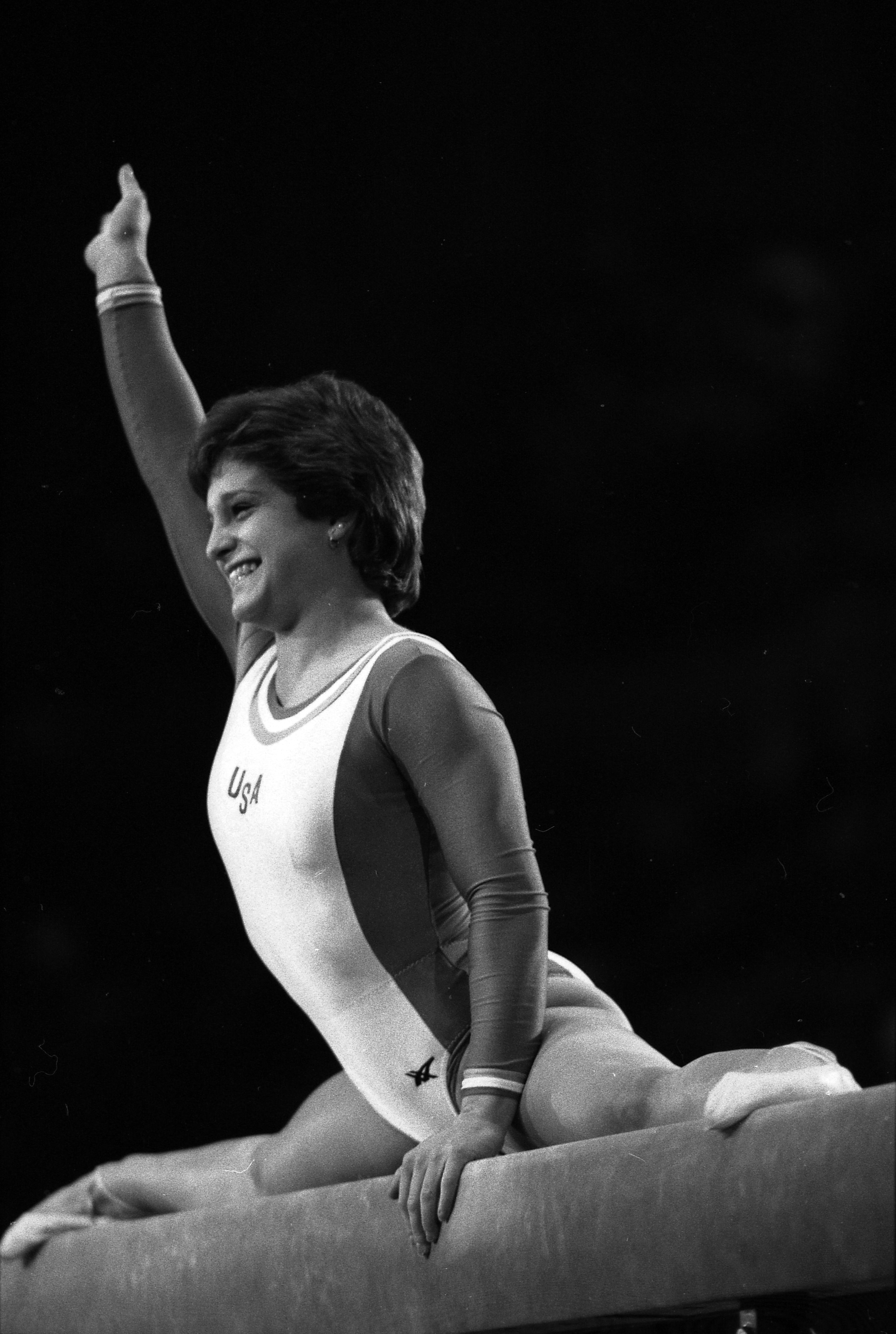
Retton performing splits on a balance beam, 1985

After winning her second American Cup, the U.S. Nationals, and the U.S. Olympic Trials in 1984, Retton suffered a knee injury when she was performing a floor routine at a local gymnastics center at this time. She had sat down to sign autographs when she felt her knee lock, forcing her to undergo an operation five weeks prior to the 1984 Summer Olympics in Los Angeles. This was the first time the Summer Olympics had been held in the United States in 52 years.

Retton recovered just in time for this most prestigious of tournaments, and in the competition, which was boycotted by the Soviet bloc nations except for Romania, Retton was engaged in a close battle with Ecaterina Szabo of Romania for the all-around gold medal. Trailing Szabo (after uneven bars and balance beam) by 0.15 with two events to go, Retton scored perfect 10s on floor exercise and vault—the last event in an especially dramatic fashion, as there had been fears that her knee injury and the subsequent surgery might impair her performance. Retton won the all-around gold medal by 0.05 points, beating Szabo to become the first female gymnast from outside Eastern Europe to win the individual all-around gold. She also became the first American woman to be an Olympic all-around champion, which was an honor she held alone until the ongoing six-peat of American all-around champions — Carly Patterson in Athens 2004, Nastia Liukin in Beijing 2008, Gabby Douglas in London 2012, Simone Biles in Rio de Janeiro 2016 and Paris 2024, and Sunisa Lee in Tokyo 2021.

At the same Olympics, Retton won four additional medals: silver in the team competition and the horse vault, and bronze in the floor exercise and uneven bars. For her performance, she was named Sports Illustrated Magazine's "Sportswoman of the Year." She appeared on a Wheaties box, and became the cereal's first official spokeswoman.

In 1985, Retton won the American Cup all-around competition for the third and final time. She retired in 1986.

== Post-gymnastics career ==
=== Political views ===
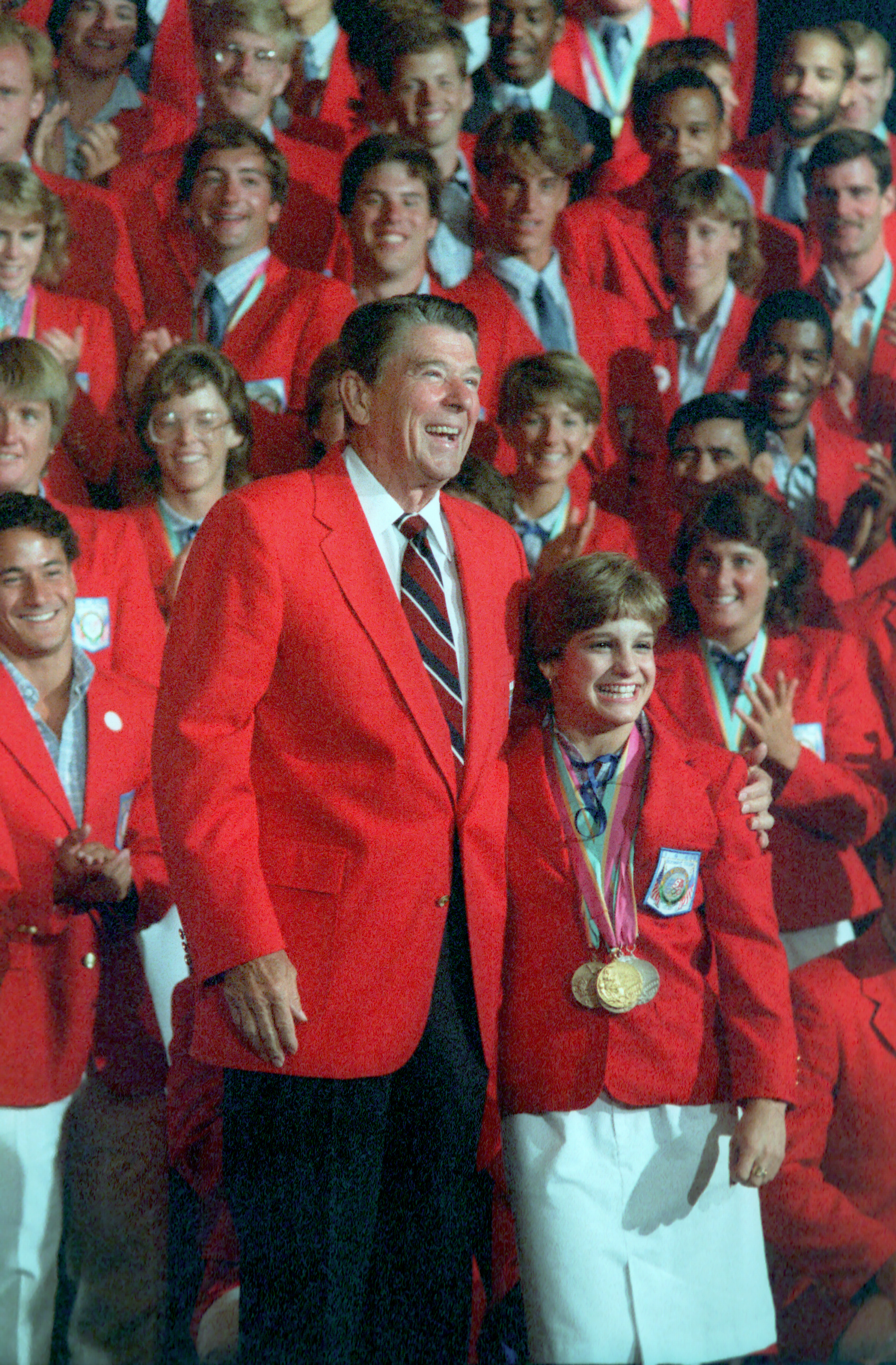
President Ronald Reagan and Retton with the U.S. Olympic Team in Los Angeles, 1984

Retton was an outspoken supporter of the Reagan administration and appeared in a variety of television ads supporting Ronald Reagan as well as appearing at a rally for his reelection campaign just a month after the Olympics in her home state of West Virginia. Retton delivered the Pledge of Allegiance with fellow former gymnast and 1996 Olympic gold medalist Kerri Strug on the second night of the 2004 Republican National Convention.

=== Honors ===
Retton's hometown, Fairmont, West Virginia, named a road and a park in the town after her. In 1985, she received the Golden Plate Award of the American Academy of Achievement presented by Awards Council member General Chuck Yeager.

Retton was elected to the National Italian American Sports Hall of Fame in 1992. In 1993, the Associated Press released results of a sports study in which Retton was statistically tied for first place with fellow Olympian Dorothy Hamill as the most popular athlete in America. In 1997, Retton was inducted into the International Gymnastics Hall of Fame. In January 2020, Retton was the first woman inducted into the Houston Sports Hall of Fame.

=== Compensated endorsements ===
During the 1990s, Retton worked as a spokeswoman, appearing in advertisements for the U.S. drugstore chain Revco.

Retton has had many commercial endorsements, including bowling and shampoo. She was the first female athlete to be pictured on the front of a Wheaties box, and General Mills stated that Wheaties sales improved after her appearance. In 2019, Retton became a spokesperson for Australian Dream, a pain relief cream; and briefly, in 2023 as a spokesperson for Colonial Penn Life Insurance.

== Lobbying against Safe Sport Authorization Act of 2017 ==
After the USA Gymnastics sex abuse scandal hit the news in 2016, the Protecting Young Victims from Sexual Abuse and Safe Sport Authorization Act of 2017 was introduced to the 115th Congress. Retton and other members of USA Gymnastics met with the bill sponsor, Senator Dianne Feinstein, with the aim of convincing her to drop the bill. Despite these efforts, President Donald Trump signed the act into law on February 14, 2018, making it effective immediately.

== Film and TV appearances ==
- 1985: ABC Funfit; hosted a series of five-minute segments on physical fitness which were broadcast between Saturday morning cartoons
- 1988: Scrooged (comedy feature film); as herself
- 1992: Knots Landing (TV drama series); as herself in the episode "Letting Go"
- 1993: Baywatch (TV series); episode "The Child Inside"
- 1994: An Evening at the Improv (improv comedy TV series); as herself
- 1994: Naked Gun 33 1/3: The Final Insult (comedy feature film); as herself
- 2002: Mary Lou's Flip Flop Shop (PBS TV series)
- 2014: RadioShack Super Bowl XLVIII commercial "The '80s Called"; cameo appearance
- 2018: 27th season of Dancing with the Stars (competition TV series), partnered with Sasha Farber; eliminated Week 6, 9th place

== Personal life ==
Retton was born with hip dysplasia, a condition that her years as a competitive gymnast aggravated. After experiencing increased pain from the condition, she underwent multiple hip replacement surgeries.

In 1990, Retton married Shannon Kelley, a former University of Texas quarterback and Houston real estate developer who worked for the Houston Baptist University athletic department as of 2012. Together they have four daughters: Shayla (born 1995), McKenna (born 1997), Skyla (born 2000), and Emma (born 2002). McKenna was an NCAA gymnast at Louisiana State University, and Emma was an NCAA gymnast at the University of Arkansas. Retton lived in Houston, Texas until 2009, when her family moved to her native West Virginia. They lived there for two years while her husband was a football coach at Fairmont State University. She moved back to Houston in 2012. Retton and Kelley were divorced in February 2018.

On October 10, 2023, Retton's daughter McKenna announced that her mother was critically ill with pneumonia. Retton reportedly did not have health insurance and turned to crowdfunding to raise money for medical expenses. Retton returned home to recover later that month and issued a statement on October 30, 2023, saying "I'm with family continuing to slowly recover and staying very positive as I know this recovery is a long and slow process. When the time is right, I will be sharing more information about my health issues." The total sum collected as of January 22, 2024, was $459,234. Upon inquiry from USA Today, Retton would not comment on any details surrounding her medical issue nor how much of the donations were allocated toward her healthcare. Her daughter said any "remaining funds" would go towards a charity, but failed to provide any details or timeline.

On May 17, 2025, Retton was arrested in Marion County, West Virginia for DUI. In July 2025 she pleaded no contest to a non-aggravated DUI charge. She was fined $100.

== See also ==
- List of Olympic female gymnasts for the United States
- List of Olympic medal leaders in women's gymnastics

Awards and achievements
Preceded by Patty Sheehan	Flo Hyman Memorial Award; 1995	Succeeded by Donna de Varona
