= Steve Penny =

American businessman and sports administrator

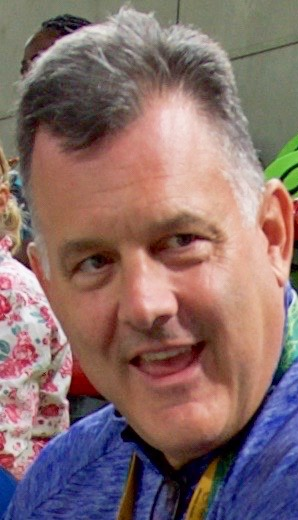
- Penny at 2016 Summer Olympics in Rio de Janeiro
- Born: 1964 (age 61–62); Washington, U.S.
- Education: University of Washington
- Occupation: Businessman
- Known for: Former president of USA Gymnastics

Stephen D. Penny Jr. (born 1964) is an American businessman and sports administrator. He was president and CEO of USA Gymnastics (USAG) from 2005 until 2017, and was a key figure in the USA Gymnastics sex abuse scandal.

== Career ==
Penny began his career in sports as a marketing and promotions assistant for the Seattle Mariners. His other employment has included work in the travel and tourism industries.

Penny became active within the Olympic movement when he was hired by Turner Broadcasting in 1989 as a research manager for the 1990 Goodwill Games. In 1991, Penny became the director of media and public relations for USA Cycling and eventually became managing director of the United States Cycling Federation, which oversaw the amateur road and track cycling disciplines. Penny left USA Cycling in 1996, returning to his hometown of Seattle to become vice president of Bob Walsh Enterprises, focused on business development in conjunction with sports marketing, events, media and consulting.

=== USA Gymnastics ===
Penny joined USA Gymnastics in March 1999 as the senior vice president, overseeing a variety of areas focused on business development. Within a few years, his responsibilities grew to oversee the marketing, sponsorship, event operations, television and communications, including the management of the 2003 World Artistic Gymnastics Championships in Anaheim, California. On April 4, 2005, Penny became president of USAG.

==== Sex abuse scandal ====
During Penny's tenure, USAG leaders routinely dismissed complaints and warnings that employees and USAG-affiliated coaches were sexually abusing gymnasts in their programs. In a 2013 lawsuit, USAG officials admitted under oath that allegations of sexual abuse were routinely dismissed as hearsay unless they came directly from a victim or victim's parent. Even when USAG leaders believed the accusers, they sometimes allowed coaches to continue coaching for years.

In a 2015 deposition in a lawsuit against USAG, Penny testified that the organization rarely forwarded allegations of child abuse to police or child protective services. He said this was to avoid the risk of damaging a coach's reputation with false allegations. He also said that USAG officials had no duty to report abuse allegations if they had no first-hand knowledge of them. USAG dismissed complaints as hearsay unless they were signed by an alleged abuse victim or a victim's parent. "To the best of my knowledge, there's no duty to report if you are—if you are a third-party to some allegation...You know, that lies with the person who has first-hand knowledge," Penny said.

Also in 2015, USAG quietly fired Larry Nassar, who had served for 18 years as sports-medicine doctor for the women's national team. USAG said it acted "after learning of athlete concerns". However, Nassar continued to run a clinic and gymnastics club at MSU, where he was a faculty member. He would ultimately be arrested on charges of sexually assaulting at least 265 girls and women under his care.

In 2016, an investigation by The Indianapolis Star found that abuses by Nassar and others were widespread because "predatory coaches were allowed to move from gym to gym, undetected by a lax system of oversight, or dangerously passed on by USA Gymnastics-certified gyms". More than 500 athletes alleged that they were sexually assaulted "by gym owners, coaches, and staff working for gymnastics programs across the country", including USAG and Michigan State University (MSU).

In February 2017, Penny was accused by former Olympic gymnast Dominique Moceanu of directing USAG' efforts to downplay the abuse of gymnasts; she called for his resignation. USAG responded by saying that Penny was a leader in ensuring the safety and well-being of USAG gymnasts.

Under pressure from the United States Olympic Committee, and "amid growing outrage over the way he and other top USAG officials responded to sexual abuse complaints against coaches and other members", Penny resigned from USAG on March 16, 2017.

Four years later, the USOPC and USAG would pay $380 million to settle lawsuits brought by more than 500 athletes who alleged that USAG was culpable in their assaults.

=== After USA Gymnastics ===
When Penny testified before Congress in June 2018, he invoked his Fifth Amendment rights to avoid answering questions, leading to a cry of "Shame!" from one onlooker.

On October 17, 2018, the United States Marshals Smoky Mountains Fugitive Task Force arrested Penny on charges of tampering with evidence during the investigation of sexual assaults against Larry Nassar. The indictment further alleges that Penny ordered the removal of the documents from the Karolyi Ranch that were related to the activities of Nassar. If convicted, Penny would have faced a punishment of 2 to 10 years in prison and up to a $10,000 fine. The evidence-tampering charges against Penny were dismissed in 2022. A dismissal letter filed on April 14, 2022, said, "There is now insufficient evidence to prosecute according to current law and facts present in the case."

The day after his arrest, USAG placed Penny on its "permanently ineligible" list of members "per the provisions in SafeSport Code for the U.S. Olympic and Paralympic Movement, III.A.4, and USA Gymnastics Bylaw 10.14(b)."

== Personal life ==
Penny graduated from Mercer Island High School, then the University of Washington. He has three daughters, triplets born in 2005.

Penny is a central figure in the 2020 film Athlete A, a documentary about the USA Gymnastics sex abuse scandal.
