= John Geddert =

American gymnastics coach (1957–2021)

- Geddert at the 2012 Summer Olympics in London
- Born: John Gerald Geddert; December 21, 1957; Detroit, Michigan, U.S.
- Died: February 25, 2021 (aged 63); DeWitt Rest Area 831, Watertown Charter Township, Michigan, U.S.
- Cause of death: Suicide by gunshot
- Education: Alpena High School; Central Michigan University
- Years active: 1976–2018
- Known for: Coach of Jordyn Wieber; Ties to Larry Nassar and the USA Gymnastics sex abuse scandal
- Spouse: Kathryn Geddert
- Children: 3
- Notable gymnasts
- Thema Williams; Jordyn Wieber

John Gerald Geddert (December 21, 1957 – February 25, 2021) was an American artistic gymnastics coach, who was a head coach of the gold-medal 2012 U.S. women's Olympic team and regular coach of team member Jordyn Wieber. He retired when suspended by USA Gymnastics in 2018 after being implicated in the USA Gymnastics sex abuse scandal centered on his long-time associate Larry Nassar. Geddert committed suicide in 2021, shortly after being charged with 24 criminal charges, including 20 counts of human trafficking of a minor, one count each of first-degree criminal sexual assault, second-degree criminal sexual assault involving a minor, and lying to a police officer.

== Gymnastics clubs ==
From 1984, Geddert was head coach at Great Lakes Gymnastics Club in Lansing, Michigan, where he first worked with Larry Nassar. In 1988, Geddert was named Male Coach of the Year for the United States Gymnastic Federation in Michigan. He won the Federation's Regional Coach of the Year award in 1990 and 1991. He was later fired from Great Lakes Gymnastics Club. In 1996, Geddert founded the Twistars USA Gymnastics Club in Dimondale. The club has a back room, where Nassar regularly treated and sexually molested young female athletes. In 2018, Geddert handed over ownership and management of the gym to his wife, Kathryn, in the wake of the Nassar sex abuse scandal.

== Coaching style ==
Many former gymnasts have described Geddert's coaching style as intense, strict, and abusive. Several former gymnasts have recounted that Geddert repeatedly told them to kill themselves. He was known to throw items in his gym when angered. On one occasion, Geddert shoved a gymnast forcefully enough for her to sustain a black eye, ruptured lymph nodes in her neck, and torn muscles in her stomach. In 2013, Geddert was under criminal investigation for his abusive treatment of gymnasts. The Eaton County Prosecutor's office stated there was enough evidence to charge Geddert, but allowed Geddert to seek counseling instead. In December 2013, a former employee of Geddert contacted USA Gymnastics to inform them of Geddert's abuse of his athletes. USA Gymnastics stated they addressed the letter writer's concerns with Geddert, though the specific actions by USA Gymnastics were never made public. Geddert retired from coaching on January 23, 2018, one day after USA Gymnastics announced that he was suspended pending an investigation into his alleged abuse.

== Involvement in U.S. sexual abuse scandal ==
Geddert's long-time association with Larry Nassar, who was convicted of sexually assaulting at least 150 women and girls, caused legal troubles for Geddert. Geddert and Nassar's close personal and professional relationships have led some to suspect that Geddert was aware of Nassar's abuse but did nothing about it. Many former gymnasts and parents have asserted that the intense and abusive environment Geddert created in his gym allowed for Nassar, a regular volunteer at Geddert's gym, to easily groom gymnasts and gain their trust. Several gymnasts have admitted that Geddert created such a hostile environment that they were unable to approach Geddert about the abuse. At least one former gymnast testified that Geddert walked in on a supposed medical session while Nassar was penetrating her with his fingers. The witness stated that Geddert joked about it and left the room. Geddert was also accused of sexually assaulting a 14 year old.

== Prosecution and death ==
On February 25, 2021, Geddert was charged with 24 felony crimes: 14 counts of human trafficking-forced labor resulting in injury, six counts of human trafficking of a minor for forced labor, and one count each of continuing criminal enterprise, first-degree criminal sexual conduct, second-degree criminal sexual conduct, and lying to a police officer during a violent crime investigation. Hours after being charged, Geddert fatally shot himself at a rest area off Interstate 96 in Watertown Charter Township, Michigan.
