= USAG =

USAG may refer to:

- United States Attorney General
- USA Gymnastics
- United States Army Garrison
