= USA Gymnastics sex abuse scandal =

Sexual abuse of young athletes by coaches and other adults (1992–2016)

USA Gymnastics logo

Beginning in the 1990s, hundreds of gymnasts—primarily minors—were sexually abused over two decades in the United States, which is considered the largest sexual abuse scandal in sports history. More than 500 athletes alleged that they were sexually assaulted by gym owners, coaches, and staff working for gymnastics programs across the country, including USA Gymnastics (USAG) and Michigan State University (MSU). Hundreds of them sued USAG, MSU, and the United States Olympic Committee (USOC, later USOPC), which settled the suits in 2018 and 2021 for a total of nearly $900 million.

The breadth of the abuses was first revealed by The Indianapolis Star, which reported in September 2016 that "predatory coaches were allowed to move from gym to gym, undetected by a lax system of oversight, or dangerously passed on by USA Gymnastics-certified gyms". Coaches and officials perpetrated, facilitated, or worked to conceal abuse in Michigan, Pennsylvania, California, Rhode Island, Indiana and elsewhere. FBI agents declined to investigate early allegations of abuse, then lied about it, according to a U.S. Justice Department report. Dozens of officials at USAG, MSU, and the United States Olympic Committee (USOC, later USOPC) ultimately resigned under pressure or had their contracts terminated. Several coaches and officials faced criminal charges, though few were convicted.

A central figure was Larry Nassar, a longtime national-team doctor for USAG and osteopathic physician in MSU's athletic department. More than 265 women said Nassar had sexually abused them under the pretense of providing medical treatment, including former USAG national team members Jessica Howard, Jamie Dantzscher, Morgan White, Jeanette Antolin, McKayla Maroney, Aly Raisman, Maggie Nichols, Gabby Douglas, Simone Biles, Jordyn Wieber, Sabrina Vega, Ashton Locklear, Kyla Ross, Madison Kocian, Amanda Jetter, Tasha Schwikert, Mattie Larson, Bailie Key, Kennedy Baker, Alyssa Baumann, and Terin Humphrey. In 2017 and 2018, Nassar pleaded guilty to federal charges of child pornography and state charges of first-degree sexual assault; he received sentences of 60 years in prison plus another 80 to 300 years. The scandal led to the Protecting Young Victims from Sexual Abuse and Safe Sport Authorization Act of 2017, which directed the creation of the U.S. Center for SafeSport.

== Origins ==
Since 1990, USA Gymnastics has kept a list of people permanently banned from coaching for sexual abuse and other reasons. The list includes Robert Dean Head, a USAG coach in Kentucky who in 1992 pled guilty to raping a 12-year-old, and Don Peters, the national coach for the 1984 Olympic team, who was banned in 2011 after two former gymnasts accused him of sexual abuse. In 2007, USAG began requiring background checks for coaches.

Yet USAG leaders also routinely dismissed warnings about coaches. For example, USAG received complaints about coach Mark Schiefelbein long before he was convicted in 2003 of molesting a 10-year-old girl. Similarly, USAG received complaints about coach James Bell at least five years before he was jailed in 2003 for molesting three young gymnasts. During testimony in the midst of a lawsuit filed in 2013, two former USAG officials divulged that they routinely dismissed allegations of sexual abuse that they did not directly hear from victims or victims' parents as hearsay. This pattern of dismissal attracted criticism from legal experts and child advocates, who have said every allegation should be reported to authorities and have noted that every state designates mandated reporters when child abuse is alleged.

Even when USAG leaders believed the accusers, they sometimes allowed coaches to continue coaching for years. For example, USAG leaders waited four years before telling the police that they had received credible allegations of sexual assault by Marvin Sharp, who became a USAG coach in 2010. Sharp was charged in 2015 with three counts of child molestation and four counts of sexual misconduct with a minor; in September 2015, while awaiting trial, he died by suicide in jail in Marion County, Indiana.

USAG received at least four complaints against Georgia coach William McCabe dating back to 1998, but they did not report the allegations to the police. One gym owner had warned that McCabe "should be locked in a cage before someone is raped". McCabe continued coaching for almost seven years until one gymnast's mother went to the Federal Bureau of Investigation (FBI) with emails that he sent to her 11-year-old daughter. McCabe was charged based on allegations that he had molested gymnasts, surreptitiously videotaped girls who were nude or changing clothes, and posted girls' nude images on the Internet. After pleading guilty to federal charges of child sexual exploitation and making false statements, he was sentenced to 30 years in prison.

In the years between 1996 and 2006, USAG received sexual abuse complaints filed against 54 coaches. The organization banned 37 of them from gymnastics, but allowed others – including some convicted of crimes – to continue coaching. One USAG regional chair spoke to the organization's president, arguing that a convicted sex offender should be allowed to keep his membership.

In a 2015 deposition in a lawsuit against USAG, USAG President Steve Penny said, "To the best of my knowledge, there's no duty to report if you are – if you are a third-party to some allegation ... You know, that lies with the person who has first-hand knowledge." Penny would resign under pressure in March 2017.

Also in 2015, USAG quietly fired its longtime Olympic team doctor Larry Nassar "after learning of athlete concerns". Nassar was a licensed osteopathic physician and the national team sports-medicine doctor for USAG. However, Nassar continued to run a clinic and gymnastics club at MSU, where he was a faculty member.

== 2016 revelations ==
Despite these and other occasional revelations about the sexual abuse of gymnasts, the general public was unaware of the scope of abuse and the efforts to cover it up until September 2016, when The Indianapolis Star became the first media outlet to report their eight-month investigation of the abuse. The investigation drew on interviews and more than 5,600 pages of court records from the McCabe case, released after the Star's Marisa Kwiatkowski requested the documents.

In September 2016, The Indianapolis Star reported that Rachael Denhollander was one of two former gymnasts who had made accusations of sexual abuse against Nassar. Following those criminal complaints, MSU reassigned Nassar from his clinical and teaching duties and fired him later that month. Since then, over 250 women and girls have accused Nassar of sexually abusing them; many of them were minors at the time of the crimes.

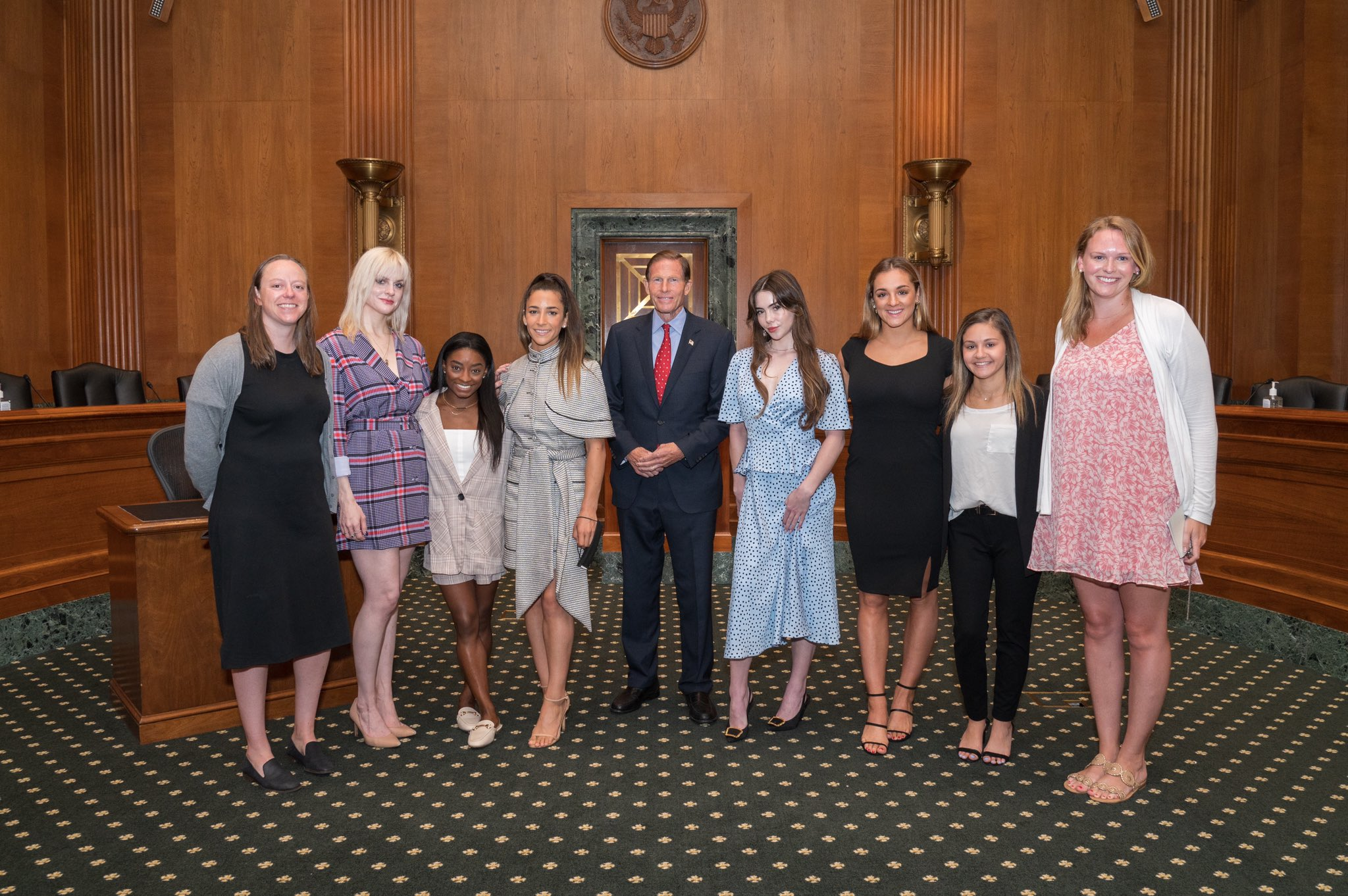
Several of the accusers in 2021, including Jessica Howard, Simone Biles, Aly Raisman, McKayla Maroney, and Maggie Nichols

According to those reports, Nassar committed sexual assaults during medical examinations and purported treatments. The molestations ranged from his inserting a finger into the gymnasts' vaginas and anuses to fondling their breasts and genitalia. These were criminal acts regardless of consent since the victims were minors. Nassar initially denied the charges, claiming that he was performing legitimate medical procedures. In February 2017, three former gymnasts—Jeanette Antolin, Jessica Howard, and Jamie Dantzscher—gave an interview with 60 Minutes in which they accused Nassar of sexually abusing them. The gymnasts also alleged that the "emotionally abusive environment" at the national team training camps run by Béla and Márta Károlyi at the Karolyi Ranch near Huntsville, Texas, gave Nassar an opportunity to take advantage of the gymnasts and made them afraid to speak up about the abuse. Rachael Denhollander, one of the first women to publicly accuse Nassar, said in court in May 2017 that Nassar sexually abused her on five doctor's visits in 2000 when she was 15 years old.

Olympic gold medalist McKayla Maroney, using the #MeToo hashtag on Twitter, stated that Nassar repeatedly molested her, starting in 2008 when she was 13 years old and continuing until she retired from the sport in 2016. Maroney filed a lawsuit against Nassar, MSU, the U.S. Olympic Committee (USOC), and USAG. The lawsuit accused USAG of covering up the sexual abuse by paying Maroney a $1.25-million settlement that required her to sign a non-disclosure agreement.

During a 60 Minutes interview, Olympic gold medalist Aly Raisman also accused Nassar of sexually abusing her when she was 15 years old. Gabby Douglas subsequently drew criticism from her Olympic teammate Simone Biles and others for sending a tweet ("...dressing in a provocative/sexual way incites the wrong crowd...") that they interpreted as criticizing Raisman and of "victim-shaming". Douglas later apologized for the tweet and said she was also a victim of Nassar's abuse.

Former national team member Maggie Nichols accused Nassar of abusing her and documented the ways he groomed her by connecting with her on Facebook and complimenting her appearance on numerous occasions. It was also reported that it was Nichols' coach, Sarah Jantzi, who first reported Nassar to USAG on June 17, 2015, after overhearing Nichols talk to other gymnasts, later revealed to be Raisman and Alyssa Baumann, about Nassar's behavior. Simone Biles came forward shortly after with firsthand accounts of how she too had been sexually abused by Nassar. Jordyn Wieber made a statement at Nassar's court sentencing in which she also accused Nassar of sexually abusing her during her time at USAG. On May 1, 2018, former national team member Sabrina Vega also accused Nassar of sexual abuse, claiming she was abused hundreds of times, beginning when she was 12. In August 2018, UCLA gymnasts and 2012 and 2016 Olympians Kyla Ross and Madison Kocian came forward as victims of Nassar. The following month, Alabama Crimson Tide gymnasts Bailie Key and Amanda Jetter also came forward with accusations against Nassar. In October, Tasha Schwikert, a member of the 2000 US Olympics team, came forward as a victim and claimed that Steve Penny pressed her to publicly support USAG at the height of the Nassar scandal. In November, Florida Gators gymnasts Kennedy Baker and Alyssa Baumann made public allegations against Nassar; Baker said she was abused during the 2012 Olympic Trials.

== Criminal proceedings ==
=== Larry Nassar ===
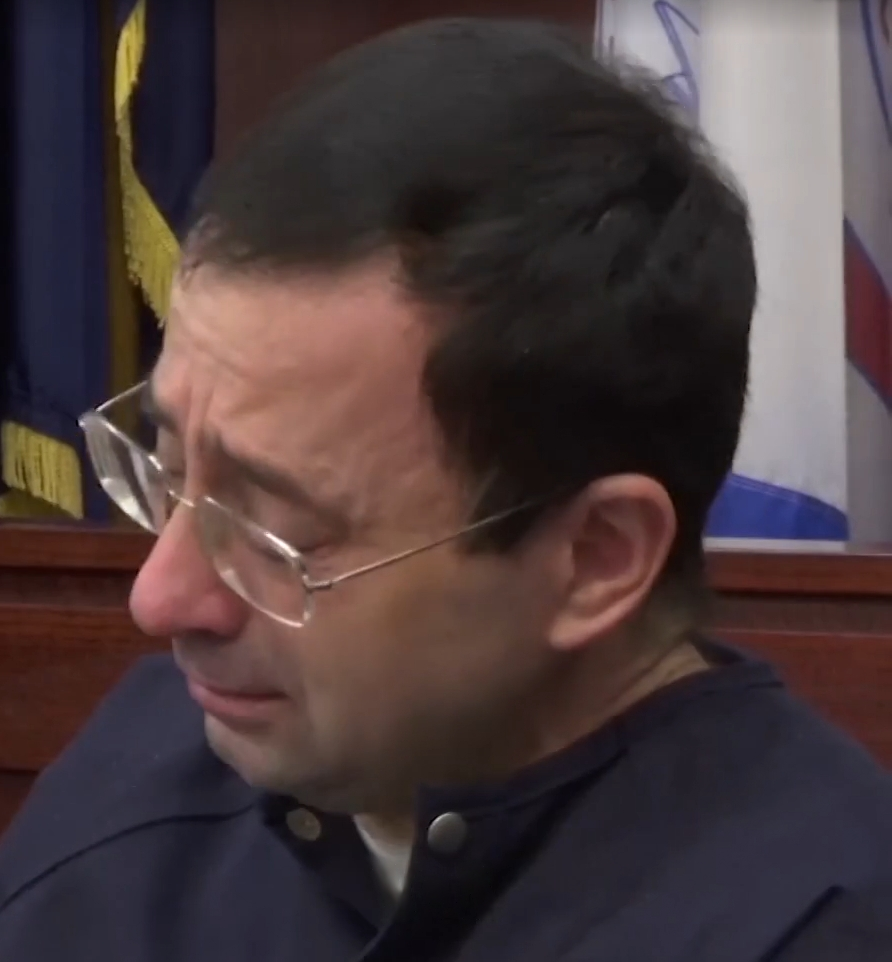
Nassar in 2018

A Voice of America report on Nassar's sentencing in 2018

In November 2016, Nassar was charged with sexual assault of a child. Michigan attorney general Bill Schuette stated that the assaults began when the victim was 6 years old in 1998 and lasted until 2005. He pleaded not guilty to three charges of first-degree criminal sexual conduct against a minor during his first court appearance.

The following month, Nassar was indicted on federal child pornography charges. According to the FBI, over 37,000 images and videos of child pornography were seized from Nassar's home, including a GoPro video of Nassar allegedly molesting girls in a swimming pool. Some of the material was found on a hard drive and disks that Nassar discarded in his trash bin outside his home. Nassar pleaded guilty to three federal child pornography charges on July 11, 2017, and was given three consecutive 20-year prison sentences by U.S. District Judge Janet T. Neff on December 7, 2017.

On November 15, 2017, it was reported that Nassar pleaded guilty to counts of sexual assault in Ingham County (which contains most of East Lansing, the home city for Michigan State) and Eaton County in Michigan. At the time, he faced a total of 22 charges, 15 in Ingham County and 7 in Eaton County. Among the allegations was that under the guise of providing legitimate treatment, he molested 7 girls at his home and at a clinic on the MSU campus. It also stated that Nassar would enter a guilty plea in Ingham County on November 22 and would then plead guilty in Eaton County on November 29 and would serve at least 25 years in prison for these crimes. Others who reported assaults by Nassar to the police were permitted to make victim impact statements during his sentencing hearing.

During his appearance before Judge Rosemarie Aquilina in Ingham County Circuit Court, and under the terms of his plea agreement, Nassar pleaded guilty to seven counts of criminal sexual conduct charges with a minimum sentence of 25 to 40 years in prison. Three of the victims were under the age of 13 and three ranged in age from 13 to 15.

More than 150 women made impact statements during Nassar's week-long sentencing hearing before the former doctor was sentenced on January 24, 2018, to state prison for 40 to 175 years. During his federal sentencing, Judge Neff had previously ordered that any state prison term run consecutive with Nassar's federal sentence. Judge Aquilina quoted a letter that Nassar had sent her before sentencing, in which he blamed his accusers. She described him as a dangerous individual who showed little remorse and said that she "signed [his] death warrant".

During his Eaton County Circuit Court appearance, Nassar pleaded guilty to engaging in sexual misconduct with three children under the age of 16. On February 5, 2018, Judge Janet Cunningham sentenced Nassar to an additional 40 to 125 years in state prison. This sentence will run consecutive to Nassar's federal sentence but concurrent to his previous state sentence from Ingham County.

It was reported in January 2018 that one of Nassar's victims filed a police report to the Meridian Township Police Department in 2004 but the police decided to not press charges against Nassar because of a PowerPoint presentation he gave to them that claimed that he was doing legitimate medical treatment.

=== William Strampel ===
Nassar's supervisor at MSU was William Strampel, dean of the College of Osteopathic Medicine. Strampel was arrested on March 26, 2018, some weeks after MSU had announced they were taking steps to fire him due to his "personal conduct". On June 10, 2019, he was convicted in Michigan state court of two misdemeanor counts of willful neglect of duty and one felony count of misconduct in office. He was acquitted of a charge of criminal sexual conduct in the second degree. On August 7, 2019, Judge Joyce Draganchuk sentenced Strampel to one year in jail. On December 5, 2019, he permanently surrendered his license to practice as a physician and agreed to pay a fine of $35,000. Strampel was scheduled to be released early for good behavior on April 3, 2020, after serving about eight months in jail, but was released even earlier: on March 19, 2020, in response to the COVID-19 pandemic. On January 15, 2021, the Michigan Court of Appeals issued a per curiam opinion rejecting his appeal and affirming Judge Draganchuk's rulings. On August 4, 2021, the Michigan Supreme Court declined to hear the case.

Strampel and Nassar were the only two MSU employees incarcerated for their role in the scandal. A former MSU coach, Kathie Klegas, served 90 days plus probation; her conviction was overturned on appeal.

=== Steve Penny ===
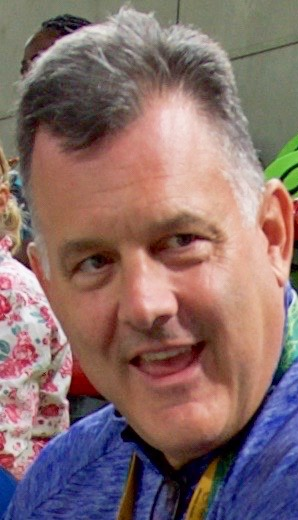
Steve Penny in 2016

On October 17, 2018, former USAG CEO Steve Penny was arrested on charges of evidence tampering in the Nassar case—specifically, of removing related documents from the Karolyi Ranch gymnastics training facility in Texas. On October 29, 2018, Penny entered a plea of not guilty. In April 2022, prosecutors dropped the charges against Penny.

=== Lou Anna Simon ===
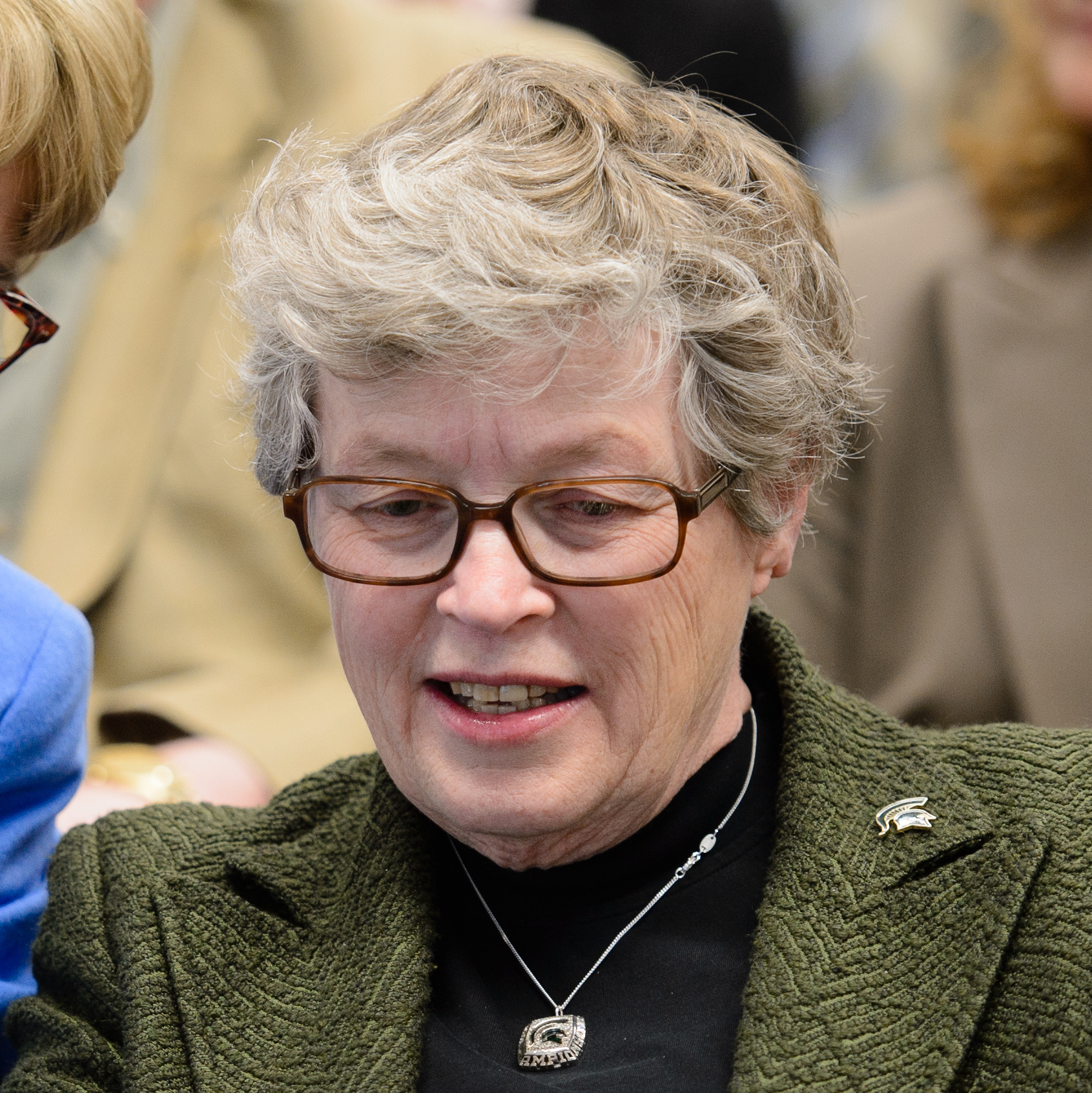
Lou Anna Simon in 2014

On November 20, 2018, former MSU president Lou Anna Simon was charged with two felonies and two misdemeanor counts for lying to the police. She was accused of falsely telling investigators she did not know the nature of a Title IX complaint against Nassar in 2014. Each felony charge carried a possible sentence of four years in prison.

On October 29, 2019, Eaton County District Court Judge Julie Reincke ruled there was sufficient evidence to bind Simon over for trial in Eaton County circuit court.

On May 13, 2020, Eaton County Judge John Maurer dismissed the charges against Simon. The Michigan attorney general's office appealed but their argument was rejected on December 21, 2021, by the Michigan Court of Appeals.

=== Kathie Klages ===
In August 2018, Kathie Klages, a former MSU gymnastics coach, was charged with one felony count and one misdemeanor count of lying to the police about her early knowledge of sexual abuse allegations against Nassar. Her trial began in February 2020. She was found guilty on two counts of lying to the police and faced up to four years in prison. Her sentencing was set for April 18, 2020, then rescheduled to July 15, then once again delayed by a water main break near the courthouse. On August 4, Klages was sentenced to 90 days in jail and 18 months of probation. On December 21, 2021, the Michigan Court of Appeals overturned Klages' conviction after determining that her false statement was "inconsequential, rather than material" to the criminal investigation of whether a MSU employee was complicit or not in allowing Nassar to prey on young athletes. Her case was dismissed in November 2022, legally clearing her after she served 90 days in jail and eight months of probation.

=== John Geddert ===
On February 25, 2021, John Geddert, the head coach of the 2012 US Women's Olympic Gymnastics Team, was charged with multiple felonies including 20 counts of human trafficking and forced labor, one count of first-degree sexual assault, one count of second-degree sexual assault, racketeering, and lying to a police officer. Geddert died by suicide shortly after his charges were announced.

== Response and impact ==
=== USAG and USOC ===
As the Indianapolis Star was preparing to publish its 2016 investigation, the organization issued a statement: "Nothing is more important to USA Gymnastics, the Board of Directors and CEO Steve Penny than protecting athletes, which requires sustained vigilance by everyone—coaches, athletes, parents, administrators and officials. We are saddened when any athlete has been harmed in the course of his or her gymnastics career".

The USAG also said that it required criminal background checks for all of its coaches. The Star's investigation, however, found that "some coaches are fired at gym after gym without being tracked or flagged by USA Gymnastics, or losing their membership with the organization". It also found that top executives at USAG had routinely dismissed sexual abuse allegations against coaches and failed to alert authorities.

Asked about Nassar in February 2017, USAG said that its executives first learned of an athlete's concern about him in June 2015. They said they conducted an internal investigation, and the following month fired Nassar and reported him to the FBI.

Many criticized USAG's leaders for their handling of the allegations against Nassar, including U.S. senators who said the organization should have reported him to law enforcement more quickly. In March 2017, Juliet Macur of The New York Times criticized USAG executives for skipping the 2017 congressional hearing on protecting young athletes from sexual abuse, and noted that the organization had not apologized for its role in the scandal. In March 2017, USAG president Steve Penny resigned amid accusations of negligence and calls for his dismissal. Two-time Olympian Aly Raisman said the severance package given to Penny, reportedly $1 million, could have been used to help the affected athletes.

In June 2017, an investigator hired by USAG to review its policies and practices issued a report. USAG subsequently announced various changes, including a requirement that all USAG members report any suspected sexual misconduct to appropriate authorities and the US Center for SafeSport.

By year's end, the scandal had cost USAG several of its largest corporate sponsors, including Procter & Gamble, Kellogg's, Under Armour, The Hershey Company, and AT&T. Procter & Gamble was the name sponsor of the National Championships for five seasons, AT&T had sponsored the American Cup since 2011, and Kellogg's sponsored a series of nationwide tours. Marketing revenues that year had accounted for about 35 percent of USAG annual revenues, or about $9.4 million.

In January 2018, USAG cut ties with several coaches and gyms that had employed Nassar. One was John Geddert, team coach of the 2012 London Olympic team and personal coach of Jordyn Wieber. Geddert operated two gyms that employed Nassar, including Twistars, one of the locations where gymnasts reported being abused by Nassar. Gymnasts had also accused Geddert of being abusive and dismissive of their injuries. One gymnast said Geddert had thrown her onto the low bar hard enough to tear the muscles in her stomach and end her career. They have said that Geddert's abuse left them vulnerable to Nassar's manipulation. Geddart retired soon after his suspension. That same month, USAG officially cut ties with Karolyi Ranch, the former national training center for the national team and a site where Nassar sexually assaulted many gymnasts. Within weeks, the Karolyi Ranch website announced that the facility had closed.

On January 22, 2018, three members of the USAG board of directors resigned.

After Nassar's sentencing on January 24, 2018, the USOC published an open letter calling for the resignations of the other members of the USAG board, lest the USOC decertify the USAG. The USOC also announced that it was launching an investigation into the scandal. All remaining USAG board members resigned on January 31.

Two days later, the Wall Street Journal reported that USOC leaders, who had previously claimed that they had learned of abuse claims in 2016, had actually heard the allegations the previous year. The Journal reported that in July 2015, USOC Chief Executive Scott Blackmun had been told by Penny that an investigation uncovered possible criminal behavior by Nassar against Olympic athletes, and that two months later, Penny had detailed the allegations against Nassar to USOC's head of security. Blackmun resigned on February 28, 2018.

On February 2, Valeri Liukin resigned as national team coordinator.

On February 28, Raisman filed a lawsuit against USAG and the USOC, claiming both organizations "knew or should have known" about the ongoing abuse. On May 1, former national team member Sabrina Vega sued USAG, the USOC, and Béla and Márta Károlyi, claiming they ignored signs about Nassar's behavior or should have known he posed a risk to the gymnasts he treated.

On September 4, USAG CEO and President Kerry Perry resigned after USOC's new CEO Sarah Hirshland called for a change in USAG leadership and the US Elite Coaches Association called for a vote of no confidence in Perry. On October 12, Mary Bono was appointed USAG's interim president and CEO. Bono resigned four days later after many people, including Raisman and Biles, criticized her ties to her former law firm, Faegre Baker Daniels, which had helped cover up Nassar's crimes.

On November 5, 2018, the USOC announced that it was starting the process to decertify USAG as the national governing body for gymnastics in the United States. One month later, USAG filed for bankruptcy.

On January 30, the U.S. Olympic & Paralympic Committee (USOC became USOPC in June 2019) proposed to settle all claims related to its cover-up of sexual assaults by paying claimants a total of $215 million, about half of what Michigan State University had paid to settle similar lawsuits. The proposal would have barred future lawsuits and prevented further investigation into the cover-up. On February 29, 2020, gymnasts Biles and Raisman expressed anger over the proposal.

On December 13, 2021, it was reported that the USOPC, USAG, and Nassar's victims had reached a $380-million settlement. The number of victims abused by Nassar was confirmed to be more than 500. This was the first time that the USOPC admitted direct responsibility for the scandal. Its leaders agreed to share the costs and responsibility with USAG in order to help the gymnastics organization emerge from bankruptcy and preserve its certification atop U.S. gymnastics. While insurers of USAG and the USOPC would pay for most of the damages, the USOPC agreed to directly pay $34 million and lend $6 million to USAG so they could pay damages.

=== MSU ===
MSU said that it first received a complaint against Nassar in 2014. A Title IX investigation into the complaint found no violation of policy and Nassar was allowed to continue treating patients under certain agreed-upon restrictions, as stipulated by MSU College of Osteopathic Medicine dean William Strampel. However, no monitoring was instituted. After allegations against Nassar were reported by The Indianapolis Star in September 2016, Nassar was fired by Michigan State for violating the 2014 agreement.

By 2017, the university faced lawsuits from 144 local and MSU athletes who said they were sexually assaulted by Larry Nassar.

MSU gymnastics coach Kathie Klages was suspended on February 13, 2017, and retired the next day. According to court documents, Klages was reportedly aware of allegations against Nassar as early as 1997. She was accused of dismissing the complaints and pressuring gymnasts to stay silent about them.

On December 12, 2017, Strampel resigned as dean and went on medical leave as faculty. After mediation ended in the civil lawsuits, MSU's board of trustees voted to establish a $10-million fund to reimburse Nassar's victims for counseling services. MSU President Lou Anna Simon also apologized to the Nassar victims and donated her just-approved raise to the Roy J. and Lou Anna K. Simon Scholarship fund.

During Nassar's sentencing in January 2018, eight former MSU athletes, including those from the gymnastics, softball, volleyball, rowing, and track and field programs, accused MSU staff of dismissing their sexual abuse complaints against Nassar.

On January 23, 2018, the National Collegiate Athletic Association opened an investigation into the university's handling of sexual abuse allegations against Nassar. On January 24, 2018, the Michigan House of Representatives voted overwhelmingly for a non-binding resolution sponsored by Rep. Adam Zemke that called for the university's board of trustees to fire President Lou Anna Simon if she did not resign. Simon resigned later that day. Two days later, MSU athletic director Mark Hollis retired.

In 2018, several other state and federal agencies investigated Michigan State's involvement, including the Michigan Attorney General's office and the US Department of Education.

As a result of the Michigan Attorney General's investigation, in March 2018, Strampel, who oversaw Nassar's clinic while dean of the College of Osteopathic Medicine, was arrested and charged with felony misconduct in office and criminal sexual conduct for allegedly groping a student and storing nude photos on his computer. Strampel also possessed a video of the pelvic floor manipulation procedure that Larry Nassar had created as a training video. The video may constitute evidence of an assault, and the investigation is continuing. On June 9, 2018, six current or former Michigan State employees linked to Nassar became the subjects of an investigation by Michigan's Department of Licensing and Regulatory Affairs.

On May 16, 2018, MSU and Nassar's victims reached a $500-million settlement.

On September 5, 2019, Secretary of Education Betsy DeVos announced that MSU would be fined $4.5 million for violating the Clery Act, which involves accurate disclosure and open access to crime statistics and crime prevention policies in colleges and universities that receive federal dollars, after two separate investigations from the Education Department's office of Federal Student Aid (FSA) and Office for Civil Rights (OCR). This was the largest Clery Act fine ever.

=== Congress ===
Congress responded to the sexual abuse claims made against Nassar and also to claims made against personnel who were involved with USA Swimming and USA Taekwondo.

On March 28, 2017, the Senate Judiciary Committee held a hearing about the bill. Former gymnasts Dominique Moceanu, Jamie Dantzscher, and Jessica Howard testified. Rick Adams, chief of Paralympic sports for the USOC and head of organizational development for the NGBs, said at the hearing, "We do take responsibility, and we apologize to any young athlete who has ever faced abuse." USAG officials declined requests to testify at the hearing.

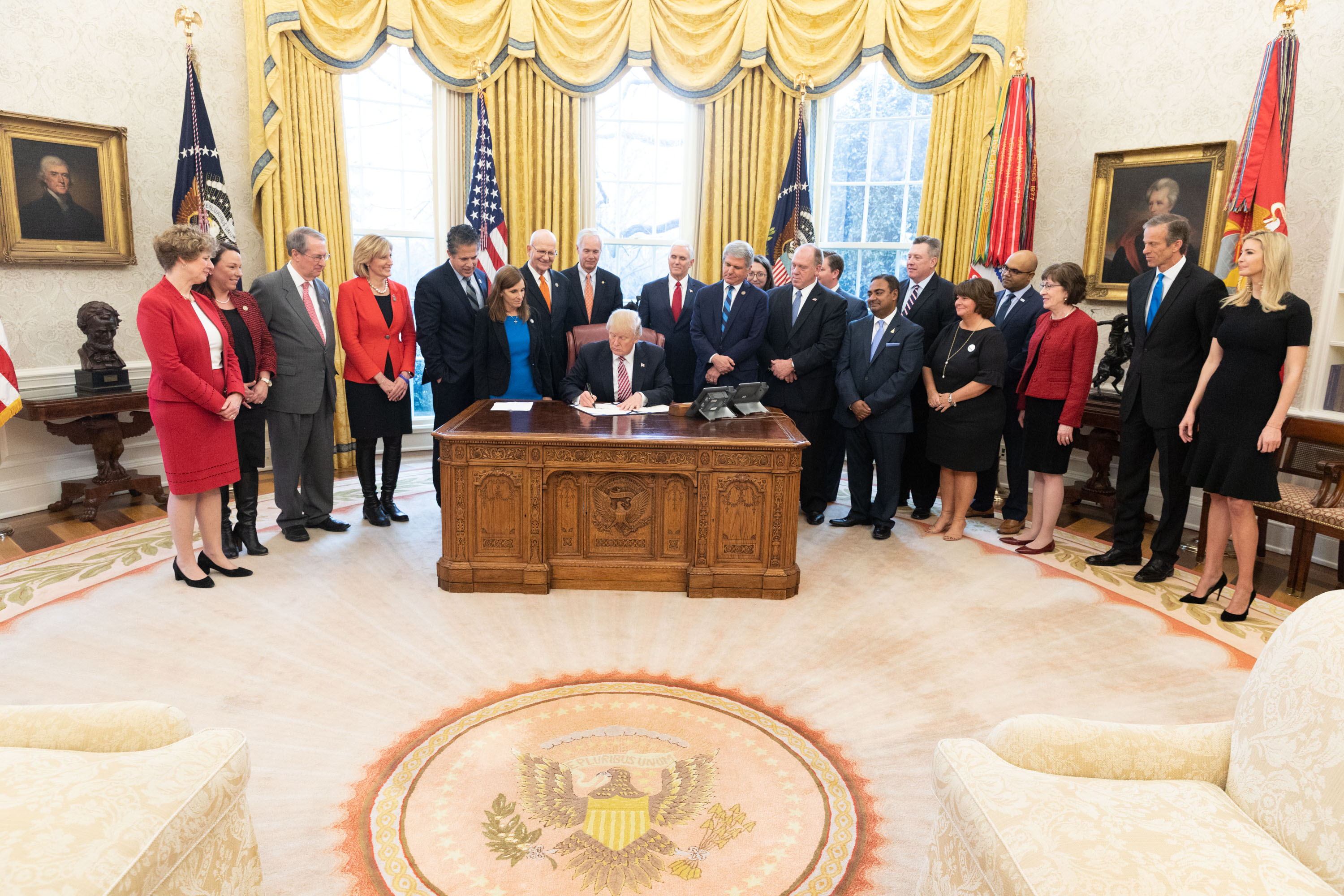
U.S. president Donald Trump signing the Protecting Young Victims from Sexual Abuse and Safe Sport Authorization Act of 2017

Later that year, a bipartisan group of U.S. senators, including Sens. Dianne Feinstein, John Thune, and others, introduced a bill to require national governing body members overseeing Olympic sports to immediately report sexual assault allegations to law enforcement or to child-welfare agencies designated by the U.S. Department of Justice. The bill amended the Ted Stevens Olympic and Amateur Sports Act, under the Commerce Committee's jurisdiction, to expand the purposes of USOC to promote a safe environment in sports that is free from abuse. Dubbed the Protecting Young Victims from Sexual Abuse and Safe Sport Authorization Act of 2017, a bipartisan bill sponsored by Senators Feinstein and John Thune and others, it was agreed to in the House of Representatives on January 29, 2018, in the Senate on January 30, 2018, and became law on February 14, 2018, when it was signed by President Donald Trump.

Among other things, the law directs the creation of a body to ensure that aspiring U.S. Olympic athletes can report allegations of abuse to an independent and non-conflicted entity for investigation and resolution, and to make sure that all national governing bodies follow the strictest standards for child abuse prevention and detection. The U.S. Center for SafeSport was duly created in 2017. It has exclusive jurisdiction over allegations of sexual misconduct and can impose sanctions up to lifetime banning of a person from involvement in all Olympic sports. It also collates a central database of disciplinary cases across all sporting disciplines.

=== FBI failure to investigate and false statements ===
The FBI failed to launch formal investigations into allegations that Nassar was abusing gymnasts; when asked about this, certain FBI officials lied and tried to cover up their failures, according to a report released in July 2021 by the Office of the Inspector General of the U.S. Department of Justice (DOJ IG). As USA Today put it, "For more than a year, complaints to the FBI went unanswered and Nassar continued treating—and raping—gymnasts at MSU, a high school in Michigan, and a gymnastics club in Michigan."

In 2015, USAG president Stephen Penny told local FBI agents in Indianapolis that three gymnasts said they were assaulted by Nassar. The FBI did not open a formal investigation or inform federal or state authorities in Michigan. In 2016, FBI agents in Los Angeles began a sexual tourism investigation against Nassar and interviewed several victims but also didn't alert Michigan authorities.

Between the time the FBI was told of Nassar's abuses and his arrest by MSU police in fall 2016, he abused more athletes—estimates range from at least 70, according to the DOJ IG report; and 120, according to Nassar's victims.

The report said that FBI agent William Jay Abbott had failed to act on the gymnasts' allegations, and later lied about doing so. The report further alleged that USAG's Penny had discussed finding Abbott a job at USA Gymnastics, while telling Abbott his concerns about the bad publicity that would be generated by the scandal.

Two months after the DOJ IG report was released in July 2021, gymnasts Maroney, Biles, Nichols, and Raisman testified to the U.S. Senate that FBI agents had mishandled their allegations against Nassar, that the agents had lied about their reports, and that they had spread misinformation about the botched investigation. Maroney testified that she was met with silence by an FBI agent after telling the agent of Nassar's "molestations in extreme detail". She said that the FBI falsified her statement and that the agents involved should be indicted; she also criticized Deputy Attorney General Lisa Monaco for not appearing at the hearing. Raisman testified that the FBI made her feel her "abuse didn't count" and "[I]t was like serving innocent children up to a pedophile on a silver platter." FBI Director Christopher Wray testified after the gymnasts, telling them that he was "deeply and profoundly sorry that so many people let you down over and over again".

In April and June 2022, 103 victims of Nassar sued the FBI for a total of $1.13 billion under the Federal Tort Claims Act for the FBI's false statements and inaction. In May 2022, the Department of Justice refused to arrest any FBI agent that was involved in the failure to investigate for 14 months.

=== Other ===
The victims received ESPN's Arthur Ashe Courage Award in 2018.

Maggie Nichols, the first to have reported Nassar, received the National Collegiate Athletic Association (NCAA) Inspiration Award for 2019.

== See also ==
- 2015 University of Louisville basketball sex scandal
- Abuse in gymnastics
- Athlete A and At the Heart of Gold – two documentaries about the Larry Nassar scandal.
- Baylor University sexual assault scandal
- Penn State child sex abuse scandal
- Ohio State University abuse scandal
- Sexual abuse in primary and secondary schools
