= Mary Lou's Flip Flop Shop =

- Starring: Mary Lou Retton; Luci Christian; Ralph Ehntholt; Jeffrey S. Lane; Claude Sims; Paula Nielsen; Scott Young; Marijane Vandivier; Alicia Church
- Music by: Leon Redbone
- No. of episodes: 13

Production
- Production companies: Y&R Productions

Original release
- Network: PBS
- Release: 2002

Mary Lou's Flip Flop Shop is a children's television series featuring Olympic champion gymnast Mary Lou Retton. It was created to motivate young children to believe in themselves and get moving. The show's theme song was performed by Leon Redbone. The show takes place in a wacky "Flip Flop Shop," and it features 4 "real" children per episode and five characters: Jumpy, Mr. Bump, Miss Warble, Professor Blinky, and L.Z. Bones.

Jumpy, a green and blue monkey, serves as Mary Lou's energetic sidekick. Mr. Bump, a clumsy yet charming delivery-man, rides around on a noisy bike with a box full of interesting packages. Miss Warble, the singing custodian, constantly keeps watch over the cleanliness of the Flip Flop Shop. Professor Blinky, an owl puppet, never fails to share wise proverbs and stories with the members of the Flip Flop Shop. L.Z. Bones is a sloth/Wookie hybrid who always tries to get out of physical activity and must be persuaded by the others to get up and join in the fun.

The show was produced by Y&R Productions, Ltd. KUHT Houston and was shown in 2002 on PBS affiliates, but was off the air within one year. In 2008, the program was added to FamilyNet's Saturday morning children's program block.

== Cast ==
Cast members include:

- Mary Lou Retton as herself
- Luci Christian as Jumpy
- Ralph Ehntholt as Mr. Bump
- Jeffrey S. Lane as L.Z. Bones
- Claude Sims as L.Z. Bones Voice
- Paula Nielsen as Miss Warble
- Scott Young as Mouse
- Marijane Vandivier as Professor Blinky
- Alicia Church as Fruit Lady
- Chelsea Ricketts
- Connor Konz
- Shelbie Bruce
- Gabi Chennisi
- Mary Moon
- Jimmy Moon
- Mary Moran
- Lauryn Story
- Jace Metzler
- Blake Goodwine
- Evan McMillan
- Vincent Ortiz
- Andrew Engle

== Episodes ==
The episodes produced for the Mary Lou's Flip Flop Shop series present and teach important life lessons while encouraging children to lead active, healthy lifestyles through “creative movement.” The following plot summaries include the title of the Mary Lou's Flip Flop Shop episode and a brief description of each show.

1. Feelings
2. Insecurity
3. Rejection
4. Cooperation
5. Sharing
6. Self Worth
7. Friends
8. Safety
9. Hurry Up
10. Disappointment
11. Forgiveness
12. Acceptance
13. Patience
