= Thema Williams =

Trinidadian artistic gymnast (born 1995)

- Full name: Thema Yakaena Williams
- Born: December 6, 1995 (age 30) Diego Martin, Trinidad and Tobago

Gymnastics career
- Discipline: Women's artistic gymnastics
- Country represented: Trinidad and Tobago
- Club: Twistars USA
- Head coach: John Geddert

Thema Yakaena Williams (born 6 December 1995) is a Trinidadian former artistic gymnast. She competed at the 2011 and 2015 World Championships and was the first gymnast to represent Trinidad and Tobago at the World Championships. She initially qualified to compete at the 2016 Olympic Test Event but was replaced with Marisa Dick.

== Gymnastics career ==
Williams began gymnastics when she was six years old because her older sister participated in the sport. She competed at the 2011 World Championships, becoming the first gymnast to represent Trinidad and Tobago at a World Championships. She finished 145th in the all-around qualifications. Later that year, she became the first gymnast to represent Trinidad and Tobago at the Pan American Games, and she placed 20th in the all-around. In 2013, she moved to the United States to train with John Geddert, coach of Olympic champion Jordyn Wieber, and she lived with a host family.

Williams competed at the 2014 Pan American Championships and finished 33rd in the all-around. She then competed at the 2014 Central American and Caribbean Games and finished 16th in the all-around. She competed on the vault, uneven bars, and balance beam at the 2015 Osijek World Challenge Cup but did not advance into any finals.

Williams finished 59th in the all-around qualifications at the 2015 World Championships and earned a berth to the 2016 Olympic Test Event—the final qualifier for the 2016 Summer Olympics—for Trinidad and Tobago. Because she placed higher than her in the all-around than teammate Marisa Dick, the Trinidad and Tobago Gymnastics Federation (TTGF) awarded Williams the berth to the Olympic Test Event based on their initial selection criteria. However, in the months leading up to the event, Dick outscored Williams at multiple competitions. The TTGF pulled Williams from the Olympic Test Event two days before the competition, and Dick competed and qualified for the 2016 Summer Olympics. The decision to pull Williams was based on an email from her coach John Geddert that she was injured, but Geddert later stated that the TTGF took his words out of context. Williams' appeal to the Trinidad and Tobago Olympic Committee was then denied. Williams sued the TTGF and was awarded $200,000 in compensation.

== Post-gymnastics ==
In 2022, Williams opened the Thema Williams Athletic Academy in Maraval, Trinidad and Tobago.
