= Don Peters =

Former American gymnastics coach

Don Peters is a former American gymnastics coach. He was head coach of the United States women's gymnastics team at the 1984 Summer Olympics. He was banned for life by USA Gymnastics in 1991 after allegations that he had sexually assaulted gymnasts.

Peters played football at Bellmar High School under coach Baptiste Manzini and later at Belle Vernon Area High School. He attended West Chester University, where he competed with the West Chester Golden Rams gymnastics team; he was team captain during his final year at the school.

Peters coached at Grossfeld School of Gymnastics, then SCATS Gymnastics in Long Beach, California. From 1980 to 1988, he served as head coach of the United States women's national artistic gymnastics team; he led them to a team silver medal at the 1984 Summer Olympics.

In 2011, Peters was banned by USA Gymnastics and removed from its hall of fame after he was alleged to have sexually assaulted three teenage gymnasts.
