= Athlete A =

2020 documentary film directed by Bonni Cohen and Jon Shenk

- Promotional poster
- Directed by: Bonni Cohen; Jon Shenk
- Produced by: Serin Marshall; Jen Sey; Julie Parker Benello
- Edited by: Don Bernier
- Music by: Jeff Beal
- Production company: Actual Films
- Distributed by: Netflix
- Release date: June 24, 2020
- Running time: 104 minutes
- Country: United States
- Language: English

Athlete A is a 2020 American documentary film about the USA Gymnastics sex abuse scandal. Directed by Bonni Cohen and Jon Shenk, the documentary follows a team of investigative journalists from The Indianapolis Star as they broke the story of doctor Larry Nassar sexually assaulting young female gymnasts and the subsequent allegations that engulfed USA Gymnastics (USAG) and its then-CEO Steve Penny. It was released on June 24, 2020, by Netflix.

The title refers to gymnast Maggie Nichols who was referred to as "Athlete A" to protect her identity while investigations into her sexual abuse by USAG doctor Larry Nassar were ongoing.

== Summary ==
While researching a story on the failure of schools to report sexual abuse, a reporter at The Indianapolis Star has a source reach out to her to suggest she look into USAG. The reporters at The Star collaborate on a piece that reveals that Steve Penny, president of the organization, worked to cover for abusive coaches. When the piece is published in 2014, Rachael Denhollander, Jessica Howard, and Jamie Dantzscher independently reach out to the team at The Star to reveal that they were sexually abused by USAG doctor Larry Nassar. Only Denhollander is willing to immediately speak on the record; during her interview she reveals that she is finally ready to come forward and plans on speaking to the police about what happened to her.

In 2015, gymnast Maggie Nichols is sexually abused by Nassar at the Karolyi Ranch and reveals the abuse to her coach who informs her parents. Her parents are called by Penny, who informs them he has reached out to law enforcement to investigate the abuse.

In 2016, The Star publishes its investigation into Nassar and Denhollander goes to the police with her evidence against Nassar. Maggie Nichols's parents, frustrated with the lack of information about their daughter's case, reach out to a lawyer who is working with other victims and discover that USAG was told of abuse going back at least as far as 2012. The criminal prosecution of Nassar goes forward, and he reaches a plea deal in 2017. Nevertheless, The Star continues to investigate the abuses perpetrated by USAG.

Penny is eventually arrested in 2018 for his role in covering up Nassar's abuse by removing documents associated with Nassar.

Nichols leaves elite gymnastics after being left off the 2016 US gymnastics Olympics team, which the documentary implies was because of her role in coming forward against Nassar. (Note: The opinion that Nichols' being left off the team was due to her reporting of Nassar is a controversial one, with many gymnastics outlets noting that Nichols suffered a knee injury a few months before the Olympics and was nowhere near her peak form at the Olympic Trials, despite having won multiple medals at the World Championships the previous year. That she was not named an alternate is more surprising, with Lauren Hopkins of The Gymternet speculating that the judges may have been asked by USA Gymnastics to score Nichols such that her rank would not warrant an alternate spot.) She competes in National Collegiate Athletic Association (NCAA) gymnastics, which reinvigorates her love of the sport.

== Release ==
Athlete A was scheduled to have its world premiere at the Tribeca Film Festival on April 17, 2020, but the festival was canceled due to the COVID-19 pandemic. The film therefore premiered when it was released on Netflix on June 24, 2020.

== Reception ==
=== Critical response ===
On the review aggregator website Rotten Tomatoes, 100% of 60 critics' reviews are positive, with an average rating of 8.4/10. The website's consensus reads: "Athlete A shines an unforgiving light on horrific abuses—as well as the culture that allowed them to continue unabated for years." On Metacritic, the film has a weighted average score of 85 out of 100, based on 12 critics, indicating "universal acclaim".

=== Accolades ===
Award	Date of ceremony	Category	Recipient(s)	Result	Ref.
Critics' Choice Documentary Awards	November 16, 2020	Best Sports Documentary	Athlete A	Won	
Critics' Choice Documentary Awards	November 16, 2020	Best Documentary Feature	Athlete A	Nominated	
Critics' Choice Documentary Awards	November 16, 2020	Best Director	Bonni Cohen and Jon Shenk	Nominated	
Critics' Choice Documentary Awards	November 16, 2020	Best Editing	Don Bernier	Nominated	
Critics' Choice Documentary Awards	November 16, 2020	Most Compelling Living Subjects of a Documentary	Maggie Nichols, Rachael Denhollander and Jamie Dantzscher	Won	
Alliance of Women Film Journalists	January 4, 2021	Best Documentary	Athlete A	Nominated	
San Diego Film Critics Society	January 11, 2021	Best Documentary	Athlete A	Nominated	
Hollywood Music in Media Awards	January 27, 2021	Best Original Score in a Documentary	Jeff Beal	Nominated	
