= Karolyi Ranch =

USA Gymnastics training center, 2001–2018

Károlyi Ranch
- The Ranch, USAG Ranch, Camp
- Interactive map of Károlyi Ranch
- Full name: USA Gymnastics National Team Training Center at Károlyi Ranch
- Address: 454 Forest Service Rd 200
- Location: Sam Houston National Forest, Walker County, Texas, U.S.
- Coordinates: 30°38′24″N 95°21′58″W
- Owner: Béla Károlyi and Márta Károlyi
- Operator: USA Gymnastics
- Acreage: 2,000 acres (810 ha)

Construction
- Opened: 1981
- Closed: 2018

Tenants
- United States women's national gymnastics team USA Gymnastics

The USA Gymnastics National Team Training Center at Karolyi Ranch or simply Karolyi Ranch in unincorporated Walker County, Texas, southeast of Huntsville, was a gymnastics camp facility which was the site of the main training center for the United States women's national gymnastics team, located 70 miles (110 km) north of Houston within the Sam Houston National Forest. From 2001 to 2018, it was the USA Gymnastics' national training facility for women's artistic, trampoline, and rhythmic gymnastics disciplines.

== History ==
In 1983, following his defection to the U.S. from Romania, Béla Károlyi purchased 40 acres of the Sam Houston National Forest, where the camp is located. A year later, gymnastics facilities and cabins were built and the ranch was opened for summer camp.

After Mary Lou Retton won a gold medal at the 1984 Olympics the ranch's enrollment increased to 1,400 students. From 1986 to 1989, the property expanded to 2,000 acres. The ranch had a state-of-the-art women's artistic gymnastics facility as well as a dance room, medical room, office, rhythmic gym, trampoline and tumble gym, and a sports acro gym. It also had athletes' and coaches' cabins, dining halls, meeting rooms, TV room and a cafeteria.

The camp portion of the property was about 36 acres (15 ha). In 2001, the ranch was designated by USA Gymnastics as the U.S. Women's National Gymnastics Training Center. In 2011, the Karolyi Ranch was recognized as a U.S. Olympic Training Site by the United States Olympic Committee.

In January 2018, USA Gymnastics terminated its lease of the Karolyi Ranch during the sentencing phase of the trial of Larry Nassar, who was found guilty of numerous acts of sexual assault against young gymnasts, many of which took place at the facility, where parents were not allowed to be present. A lawsuit was filed against the Károlyis in 2016 alleging that they had known about and "turned a blind-eye to the sexual abuse".

On 25 January 2018, the Ranch announced the permanent closure of the facility on its website. On 30 January 2018, the Texas Rangers took over the criminal investigation of the ranch.

In June 2021, Voyager Group LTD, which is tied to a local lumber company, purchased the property for $6 million from a business entity run by the Karolyis, according to a KPRC 2 news Investigation. Following the sale, the Karolyis made a trip to Romania. "They're not in the best of health and it requires a lot of upkeep out at the ranch, and they just couldn't do it anymore," said David Berg, the attorney representing the Karolyis.

== National Team camps ==
National Team camps for the women's artistic program were held once a month at the ranch, attended by members of the women's national team and selected elite gymnasts. Other training models had been tried in the past but had been unsuccessful. Based on the former Soviet model, gymnasts used to live at national training centers. Later, they trained with local coaches closer to home and came together every four years to train as a national team. In 1999, USA Gymnastics settled on a "hybrid" approach combining these two training methods: Gymnasts trained with local coaches, but each month they and their coaches attended a four-day camp with Márta Károlyi.

After the poor performance of the United States Olympic Team at the 2000 Sydney Olympics, the method of selecting athletes for competitions was also changed. In the past, the six gymnasts with the top scores at the Olympic Trials went on to compete in the Olympics, but after 2000, the team was picked by Károlyi after a five-day training camp at the ranch. Kelli Hill, who coached Olympians Dominique Dawes and Elise Ray, spoke in favor of maintaining the old ranking system.

== See also ==
- World Olympic Gymnastics Academy
