= Safe Sport Authorization Act =

American law

Protecting Young Victims from Sexual Abuse and Safe Sport Authorization Act of 2017
- Long title: A bill to prevent the sexual abuse of minors and amateur athletes by requiring the prompt reporting of sexual abuse to law enforcement authorities, and for other purposes.
- Enacted by: the 115th United States Congress

Citations
- Public law: Pub. L. 115–126 (text) (PDF)
- Statutes at Large: 132 Stat. 318

Codification
- Titles amended: 18 U.S.C.: Crimes and Criminal Procedure;34 U.S.C.: Crime Control and Law Enforcement;Title 36 of the United States Code
- U.S.C. sections created: 36 U.S.C. ch. 220541

Legislative history
- Introduced in the Senate by Dianne Feinstein (D–CA); John Thune (R–SD); Committee consideration by United States Senate Committee on the Judiciary; United States Senate Committee on Commerce, Science, and Transportation; Passed the Senate on November 14, 2017 (unanimous consent); Passed the House on January 29, 2018 (Yeas: 406; Nays: 3) with amendment; Senate agreed to House amendment on January 30, 2018 (voice vote); Signed into law by President Donald Trump on February 14, 2018

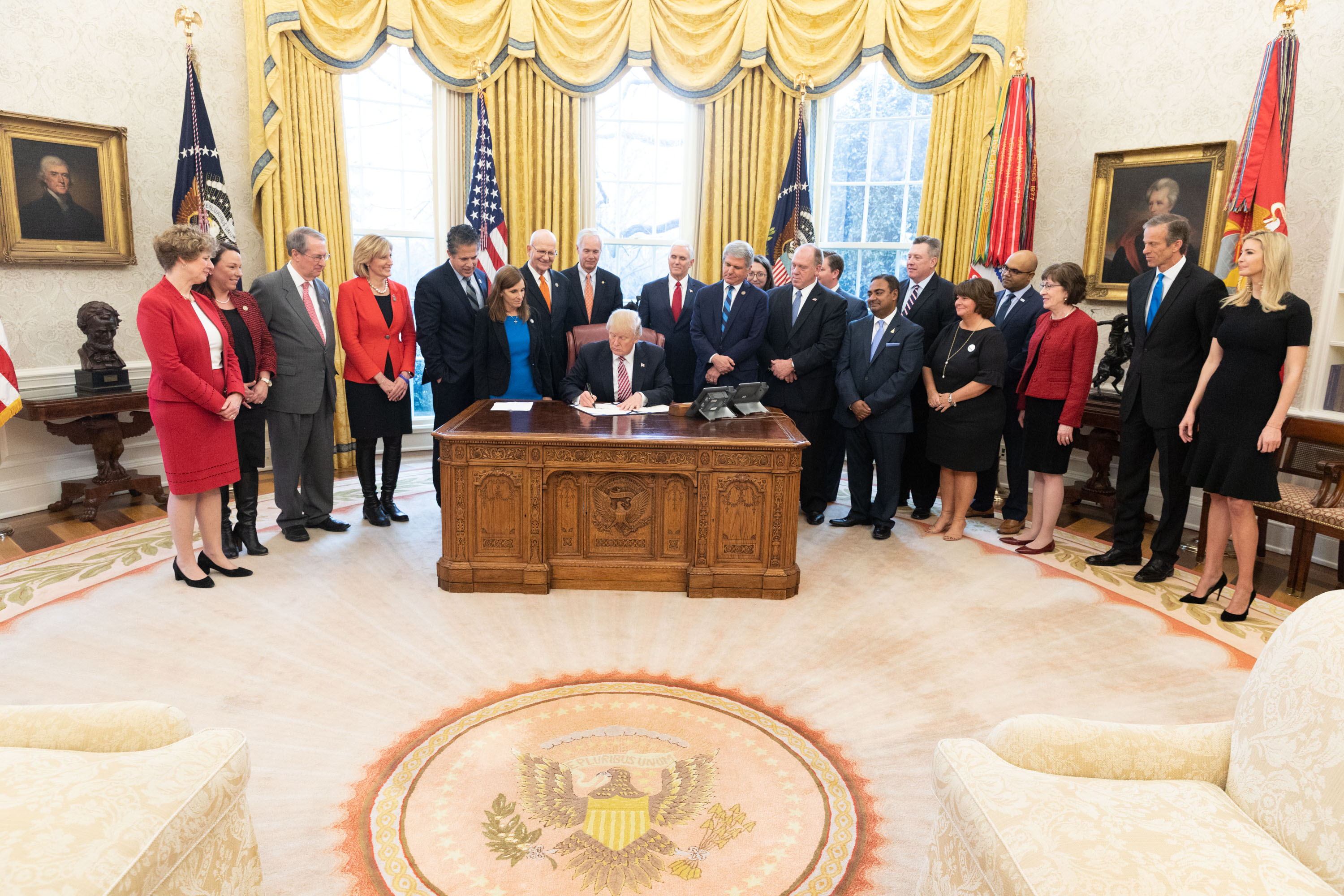
Donald Trump signs the Protecting Young Victims from Sexual Abuse and Safe Sport Authorization Act of 2017

The Protecting Young Victims from Sexual Abuse and Safe Sport Authorization Act of 2017, also known as the Safe Sport Authorization Act, is an American law that establishes protection for young athletes. Among its provisions, it established the United States Center for SafeSport as an independent entity to investigate reports of abuse and to protect athletes from abuse in the United States Olympic movement.

== History ==
The Safe Sport Authorization Act requires Olympic governing bodies and amateur sports organizations to report sex abuse allegations immediately to local or federal law enforcement, or a child welfare agency designated by the US Justice Department. It further gives the United States Center for SafeSport the responsibility of ensuring that aspiring U.S. Olympic athletes can report allegations of abuse to it as an independent and non-conflicted entity for investigation and resolution, and to make sure that all national governing bodies follow the strictest standards for child abuse prevention and detection.

The bill amended the Ted Stevens Olympic and Amateur Sports Act, under the Commerce Committee's jurisdiction, to expand the purposes of United States Olympic & Paralympic Committee to promote a safe environment in sports that is free from abuse.

The Protecting Young Victims from Sexual Abuse and Safe Sport Authorization Act of 2017 combined separate bills introduced in the 115th Congress by Senators Dianne Feinstein (D–CA) and John Thune (R–SD) in response to the USA Gymnastics sex abuse scandal, allegations made against personnel involved with USA Swimming and USA Taekwondo, and following Senate hearings by the Senate Judiciary Committee and the Senate Commerce Committee on issues of athlete safety. Senator Feinstein introduced S. 534, the Protecting Young Victims from Sexual Abuse Act on March 6, 2017. Senator Thune introduced S. 1426, the United States Center for Safe Sport Authorization Act, on June 29, 2017. Following negotiations, the two bills were merged and ultimately signed into law by President Donald Trump on February 14, 2018.

== SafeSport ==
As a direct result, the United States Center for SafeSport was established in 2017 under the auspices of the Protecting Young Victims from Sexual Abuse and Safe Sport Authorization of 2017. SafeSport seeks to address the problem of sexual abuse of minors and Olympic athletes in sport. Its primary focus, for which it has exclusive jurisdiction, is to review allegations of sexual misconduct, and to impose sanctions up to the lifetime ban of a person from all Olympic sports. The function of SafeSport also covers providing a public central database of sanctioned individuals across all sports. In 2019–20, the Center imposed temporary measures in 6% of cases – those where the charges were most serious and demanded to be addressed most urgently. In 71% of cases in which final sanctions were imposed, they consisted of some level of suspension or ineligibility. As of October 2021, the Center had sanctioned 1,100 people, with the highest sanctions being permanent ineligibility. The Center cannot indict or jail individuals accused of sexual misconduct, as it is neither a law enforcement agency nor a legal body of the U.S. judiciary, instead being a sports investigative body; however, it can forward its investigations to state and federal courts, which in turn can impose criminal penalties on the defendants.
