= USA Gymnastics =

National gymnastics governing body

- Abbreviation: USAG
- Formation: 1963; 63 years ago
- Type: 501(c)(3) organization
- Headquarters: Indianapolis, Indiana
- Region served: United States
- Members: more than 174,000 (more than 148,000 competing athletes)
- CEO: Kyle Albrecht
- Main organ: Board of Directors
- Parent organization: United States Olympic & Paralympic Committee (USOPC)
- Affiliations: World Gymnastics
- Staff: more than 60
- Website: usagym.org
- Formerly called: U.S. Gymnastics Federation

United States of America Gymnastics (USA Gymnastics or USAG) is the national governing body for gymnastics in the United States. Established in 1963 as the U.S. Gymnastics Federation (USGF), USA Gymnastics is responsible for selecting and training national teams for the Olympic Games and World Championships. USAG sets the rules and policies that govern the sport of gymnastics, including "promoting and developing gymnastics on the grassroots and national levels, as well as a safe, empowered and positive training environment, and serving as a resource center for members, clubs, fans and gymnasts throughout the United States."

USAG was at the center of the largest sexual abuse scandal in sports history. From the 1990s to the mid-2010s, hundreds of gymnasts—primarily minors—were sexually abused by gym owners, coaches, and staff who worked for the organization and gymnastics programs that it oversaw. In the years after the scandal first drew national attention in 2016, USAG declared bankruptcy, changed its entire leadership, implemented structural reforms, and, along with two other organizations, settled lawsuits brought by victims for nearly $900 million.

== History ==
The organization was established in 1963 as the U.S. Gymnastics Federation.

The need for a governing body had begun to appear at the 1959 Pan American Games, when friction developed between the Games' organizers, the Amateur Athletic Union, and the Olympic Gymnastics Committee. The NCAA was dissatisfied as well, and asked the National Association of Gymnastics Coaches to begin planning for a new national governing body. The U.S. Gymnastics Federation was established in 1963. However, resistance by the AAU, which was hesitant to relinquish control over gymnastics, and other factors meant that the new federation was not internationally recognized as the governing body of U.S. gymnastics until 1970.

The organization was renamed USA Gymnastics in 1993.

=== Sex abuse scandal ===
Since 1990, USA Gymnastics has kept a list of people permanently banned from coaching for sexual abuse and other reasons. Yet USAG leaders also routinely dismissed warnings about coaches. Even when USAG leaders believed the accusers, they sometimes allowed coaches to continue coaching for years. In the years between 1996 and 2006, USAG received sexual abuse complaints filed against 54 coaches. The organization banned 37 of them from gymnastics, but allowed others—including some convicted of crimes—to continue coaching.

In 2015, USAG quietly fired its longtime Olympic team doctor Larry Nassar "after learning of athlete concerns". But Nassar continued to run a clinic and gymnastics club at MSU, where he was a faculty member.

Despite these and other occasional revelations about the sexual abuse of gymnasts, the general public was unaware of the scope of abuse and the efforts to cover it up until September 2016, when The Indianapolis Star began to report on the abuses by employees of USAG and gymnastics programs and gyms they oversaw. Rachael Denhollander became the first of hundreds of women and girls to publicly accuse Nassar of sexually abusing them. Within months, USAG hired a former US federal prosecutor to develop recommendations to reform its policies related to sexual misconduct; her report included 70 recommendations. USAG also cut ties with the Karolyi Ranch—the official U.S. Women's National Team Training Center since 2001—after several gymnasts said they had been abused by Nassar on the premises. Valeri Liukin, a Soviet Olympic medalist and owner of World Olympic Gymnastics Academy, resigned from this role of the U.S. women's gymnastics team coordinator amid his involvement in the scandal.

In 2017, USAG CEO Steve Penny was forced to resign after he was said to have waited weeks to notify the FBI of sexual abuse allegations against Nassar.

In 2018, Nassar pleaded guilty to sexually abusing more than 300 girls and women. After his sentencing, the United States Olympic & Paralympic Committee (USOPC) threatened to decertify USA Gymnastics unless the entire board resigned. USA Gymnastics complied and all 21 board members resigned on January 26. On November 5, 2018, the USOPC announced that it was starting the process to decertify USAG as the national governing body for gymnastics in the United States. One month later, USA Gymnastics filed for bankruptcy.

USAG implemented structural reforms and returned to solvency. In 2018 and 2021, USAG and two related organizations settled lawsuits brought by victims for a total of nearly $900 million.

=== 2019–present ===
On February 19, 2019, USA Gymnastics appointed a new president and CEO Li Li Leung, who most recently served as a vice president at the National Basketball Association (NBA). She is a former gymnast, who was subsequently involved in the sport on a grassroots level. Leung stated that she was "honored to be the next CEO of USA Gymnastics and to lead an organization that plays an important role in a sport that [she cares] deeply about and had so much positive influence on my life." She further commented that she "was upset and angry to learn about the abuse and the institutions that let the athletes down. I the courage and strength of the survivors, and […] will make it a priority to see that their claims are resolved. I forward to collaborating with the entire gymnastics community to create further change going forward, which requires that we implement important initiatives to strengthen athlete health and safety and build a clear and inclusive plan for the future. For me, this is much more than a job: it is a personal calling, for which I ready to answer."

Leung stepped down after a six-year tenure in late 2025 and was succeeded by former Major League Soccer (MLS) executive Kyle Albrecht.

== Programs ==
The programs governed by USAG are:

- Women's artistic gymnastics (WAG)
- Men's artistic gymnastics (MAG)
- Rhythmic gymnastics
- Trampoline & tumbling (T&T)
- Acrobatic gymnastics
- Parkour
- Gymnastics for All

=== Women's Artistic programs ===
==== Elite Program ====
The Elite Program consists of regional and national training programs and competitions designed for athletes aspiring to represent the United States in international competition. Athletes participate at Developmental, Open, Pre-Elite, and National Team training camps. Only athletes at the National Team level are part of the Elite division. There are two Elite groups: Junior Elite (ages 11–15) and Senior Elite (ages 16+).

Annual elite-level competitions include the American Cup, U.S. Classic, and U.S. Championships; there are also National Qualifying Meets throughout the year. Junior and Senior National Teams are selected based on performance at the U.S. Championships. These athletes then compete at the World Championships. In Olympic years, elite gymnasts compete at the Summer Olympics.

To get to the elite level, a gymnast must pass the elite compulsory and optional qualifiers. In elite compulsory qualifiers, gymnasts compete a basic routine designed by organizers to demonstrate that the gymnast has all the basic skills, including twists, handsprings, jumps, leaps, kips to cast handstand, giants, turns, and more. In elite optionals, gymnasts create their own routines with advanced skills and moves, such as pak saltos, releases, complex dismounts, multiple tucks/twists, double layouts, twisting vaults, and more.

==== Talent Opportunity Program ====
The Talent Opportunity Program (TOPs) seeks to identify talented gymnasts aged 7–10 for training to the elite level. State and regional evaluations are followed by a national test of physical abilities and basic gymnastics skills each October, then a national training camp in December for those who qualify.

==== Olympics Hopefuls program ====
The Olympics Hopefuls program (HOPEs) seeks to identify talented gymnasts, generally aged 11–14, and train them to an advanced level. To qualify for HOPEs, a gymnast must pass the elite compulsory and optional qualifiers with a certain minimum score. HOPEs Elite gymnasts compete at elite meets, but not as a Junior Elite.

==== Women's Development Program ====
The Women's Development Program (previously the Junior Olympic program) provides training, evaluation, and competition opportunities to allow developing gymnasts to safely advance at their own pace through specific skill levels. Most competitive gymnasts advance through this system.

As of August 1, 2013, the levels are.

- Developmental levels 1–2: fundamental skills performed in a non-competitive, achievement-oriented environment
- Compulsory levels 3–5: progressively difficult skills performed competitively as standardized routines (all gymnasts at a given level perform the same routines)
- Optional levels 6–10: progressively difficult skills performed competitively in original routines

Skills are grouped by degree of difficulty and given the letter ratings A–E, with A denoting the easiest skills. Levels 6–8 have difficulty restrictions, in that a gymnast competing at one of these levels may not attempt skills above a certain level of difficulty (for example, level 6 and 7 gymnasts may only include A and B skills in their routines). Levels 9 and 10 have no such difficulty restrictions, although level 9 gymnasts may include only one D or E skill in any single routine.

All beginning gymnasts enter the program at level 1 and may advance through more than one level per year. Certain levels have minimum ages. For example, level 8 and 9 gymnasts must be at least 8 years old; level 10 gymnasts must be at least 9 years old. Competitions for gymnasts at level 7 culminate in State Championships, level 8 at Regional Championships, level 9 at Eastern or Western Championships, and level 10 at Junior Olympic National Championships.

Until 2013, the developmental levels were numbered 1–4, the compulsory levels 5–6, and the optional levels 7–10. The old levels 1 and 2 have been combined into the new level 1; level 7 has been split into the new levels 6 and 7; and the numbering of levels 3–6 have each been shifted down one level for the new system.

==== Xcel Program ====
The Xcel Program provides training and competition experience for gymnasts outside of the traditional Junior Olympic program. Its stated purpose is "to provide gymnasts of varying abilities and commitment levels, the opportunity for a rewarding gymnastics experience." Participants compete in individual and team competitions in Bronze, Silver, Gold, Platinum, Diamond, and Sapphire divisions, based on age and ability.

== National teams ==
- United States women's national gymnastics team
- United States men's national gymnastics team

== See also ==
- World Gymnastics – International governing body
- Artistic gymnastics in the United States
