= Gymnastics at the 1984 Summer Olympics – Women's artistic team all-around =

Women's artistic team all-around at the Games of the XXIII Olympiad
- Venue: Pauley Pavilion
- Date: July 30-August 1, 1984
- Competitors: 65 from 15 nations

Medalists
1st place, gold medalist(s)		Lavinia Agache, Laura Cutina, Cristina Elena Grigoraș, Simona Păucă, Mihaela Stănuleț, Ecaterina Szabo	Romania
2nd place, silver medalist(s)		Pam Bileck, Michelle Dusserre, Kathy Johnson, Julianne McNamara, Mary Lou Retton, Tracee Talavera	United States
3rd place, bronze medalist(s)		Chen Yongyan, Huang Qun, Ma Yanhong, Wu Jiani, Zhou Ping, Zhou Qiurui	China

These are the results of the women's team all-around competition, one of six events for female competitors in artistic gymnastics at the 1984 Summer Olympics in Los Angeles. The compulsory and optional rounds took place on July 30 and August 1 at UCLA’s Pauley Pavilion.

Due to 1984 Summer Olympics boycott, USSR women's national gymnastics team did not participate in the 1984 Olympics. The 1984 Olympics marked the first time that the USSR did not win the gold medal in Olympic women's team all-around competition, since the 1948 Summer Olympics. Romania won gold in this event for the first time in history.

== Results ==
The final score for each team was determined by combining all of the scores earned by the team on each apparatus during the compulsory and optional rounds. If all six gymnasts on a team performed a routine on a single apparatus during compulsories or optionals, only the five highest scores on that apparatus counted toward the team total.

Rank	Team	Vault			Uneven Bars			Balance Beam			Floor			Total	Rank
Rank	Team	C	O	Rank	C	O	Rank	C	O	Rank	C	O	Rank	Total	Rank
Gold medal	Romania	98.600		1	97.600		2	98.050		1	97.950		2	392.200	
Gold medal	Ecaterina Szabo	9.900	10.000	1	9.900	9.300	13	9.750	9.950	2	10.000	9.950	1	78.750	2
Gold medal	Laura Cutina	9.800	9.800	8	9.750	9.900	4	9.650	9.800	8	9.800	9.900	4	78.400	3
Gold medal	Simona Păucă	9.800	9.650	15	9.700	9.650	11	9.800	10.000	1	9.700	9.750	10	78.050	7
Gold medal	Cristina Grigoraș	9.700	9.900	8	9.600	9.800	8	9.650	9.750	9	9.750	9.750	7	77.900	8
Gold medal	Mihaela Stănuleț	9.800	9.800	8	9.700	9.800	7	9.700	9.800	6	9.800	9.300	26	77.700	10
Gold medal	Lavinia Agache	9.900	9.900	3	9.850	9.550	8	9.850	9.400	12	9.950	9.200	12	77.600	11
Silver medal	United States	98.300		2	97.850		1	96.600		3	98.450		1	391.200	
Silver medal	Mary Lou Retton	9.900	10.000	1	9.800	9.900	3	9.850	9.750	4	9.950	9.900	3	79.050	1
Silver medal	Julianne McNamara	9.800	9.750	11	9.900	10.000	1	9.850	9.200	17	9.900	10.000	2	78.400	3
Silver medal	Kathy Johnson	9.850	9.800	5	9.600	9.800	8	9.850	9.750	4	9.800	9.650	10	78.100	6
Silver medal	Michelle Dusserre	9.800	9.700	13	9.850	9.800	4	9.400	9.400	24	9.700	9.900	5	77.550	12
Silver medal	Tracee Talavera	9.800	9.900	4	9.450	9.750	13	9.650	9.150	24	9.600	9.800	15	77.100	16
Silver medal	Pam Bileck	9.800	9.600	16	9.000	9.600	33	9.700	9.600	10	9.700	9.800	7	76.800	17
Bronze medal	China	97.450		4	96.850		3	96.900		2	97.400		5	388.600	
Bronze medal	Ma Yanhong	9.650	9.650	20	9.900	10.000	1	9.700	9.800	6	9.800	9.700	7	78.300	5
Bronze medal	Wu Jiani	9.400	9.700	32	9.750	9.900	4	9.750	9.900	3	9.850	9.500	16	77.750	9
Bronze medal	Chen Yongyan	9.900	9.750	5	9.150	9.800	18	9.550	9.750	10	9.800	9.650	10	77.350	13
Bronze medal	Zhou Ping	9.900	9.750	5	9.550	9.650	13	9.600	9.650	12	9.900	9.350	18	77.350	13
Bronze medal	Zhou Qiurui	9.850	9.700	11	9.500	9.150	30	9.600	9.150	26	9.800	9.750	6	76.500	19
Bronze medal	Huang Qun	9.600	9.650	21	8.900	9.650	34	9.600	9.550	15	9.700	9.650	16	76.300	21
4	West Germany	96.100		5	94.500		5	93.850		5	94.700		4	379.150	
4	Elke Heine	9.650	9.700	18	9.550	9.600	16	9.250	9.600	21	9.700	9.500	19	76.550	18
4	Anja Wilhelm	9.550	9.650	26	9.600	9.350	18	9.400	9.700	16	9.650	9.550	19	76.450	20
4	Astrid Beckers	9.550	9.450	36	9.000	9.400	39	9.200	9.450	29	9.600	9.600	19	75.250	29
4	Angela Golz	9.500	9.500	36	9.300	9.500	23	9.300	9.200	35	9.600	8.950	51	74.850	31
4	Brigitta Lehmann	9.700	9.800	13	9.450	9.250	27	9.250	9.200	36	9.400	8.800	61	74.850	31
4	Heike Schwarm	9.550	9.350	45	9.500	9.250	25	9.150	9.500	29	9.500	9.050	51	74.850	31
5	Canada	95.950		3	93.500		7	94.000		4	95.450		3	378.900	
5	Andrea Thomas	9.700	9.550	21	9.300	9.400	27	9.700	9.000	28	9.500	9.700	19	75.850	23
5	Bonnie Wittmeier	9.750	9.400	28	9.450	9.400	21	9.550	9.500	17	9.600	9.200	40	75.850	23
5	Anita Botnen	9.500	9.150	56	9.100	9.700	23	9.400	9.550	19	9.450	9.700	23	75.550	27
5	Gigi Zosa	9.600	9.550	28	9.350	9.100	36	9.400	9.350	26	9.400	9.650	30	75.400	28
5	Jessica Tudos	9.500	9.500	36	8.650	9.650	42	9.050	9.500	33	9.350	9.550	37	74.750	36
5	Kelly Brown	9.800	9.600	16	8.700	9.450	44	8.950	8.850	56	8.600	9.550	62	73.500	50
6	Japan	95.550		6	92.250		6	93.100		6	95.850		6	376.750	
6	Maiko Morio	9.600	9.450	34	8.800	9.750	34	9.350	9.500	21	9.750	9.700	10	75.900	22
6	Noriko Mochizuki	9.750	9.500	21	9.300	9.750	17	9.400	8.900	39	9.700	9.400	26	75.700	26
6	Chihiro Oyagi	9.700	9.200	45	9.100	9.600	27	8.850	9.350	43	9.600	9.450	30	74.850	31
6	Tokie Kawase	9.750	9.500	21	8.800	9.650	36	9.150	8.900	48	9.650	9.450	26	74.850	31
6	Ayami Yukimori	9.500	9.300	50	8.050	9.250	58	9.250	9.600	21	9.550	9.400	35	73.900	45
6	Sae Watanabe	9.800	8.700	61	8.100	9.400	54	9.300	9.300	32	9.750	9.400	23	73.750	47
7	Great Britain	95.500		11	91.900		4	91.150		7	95.300		8	373.850	
7	Natalie Davies	9.400	9.450	48	9.300	9.350	30	9.450	9.000	36	9.600	9.500	12	75.050	30
7	Amanda Harrison	9.500	9.600	32	9.000	9.450	36	8.700	9.250	53	9.500	9.550	30	74.550	38
7	Kathleen Williams	9.550	9.600	28	9.200	8.950	44	8.900	9.400	39	9.500	9.350	39	74.450	39
7	Hayley Price	9.400	9.750	28	8.600	9.050	52	8.950	9.350	39	9.550	9.400	35	74.050	43
7	Lisa Young	9.350	9.350	55	9.350	9.400	25	9.100	8.500	61	9.400	9.600	33	74.050	43
7	Sally Larner	9.650	9.600	21	8.400	9.250	53	9.000	8.750	59	9.300	9.700	33	73.600	48
8	Switzerland	95.150		7	92.450		10	91.350		9	94.550		7	373.500	
8	Romi Kessler	9.750	9.600	18	9.600	9.750	11	9.500	9.700	14	9.650	9.800	10	77.350	13
8	Susi Latanzio	9.550	9.400	40	9.150	9.500	30	9.150	8.900	48	9.300	9.450	43	74.400	41
8	Natalie Seiler	9.550	9.400	40	8.800	9.600	39	9.000	9.150	45	9.250	9.400	50	74.150	42
8	Monika Beer	9.650	9.400	34	8.350	9.100	56	9.250	8.550	56	9.350	9.550	37	73.200	51
8	Bettina Ernst	9.550	9.300	48	8.900	9.400	42	8.650	8.600	64	9.450	9.350	40	73.200	51
8	Marisa Jervella	9.450	9.100	60	8.650	8.850	54	9.100	9.000	47	9.100	9.300	57	72.550	58
9	Spain	94.750		9	91.100		8	92.300		12	93.950		9	372.100	
9	Laura Muñoz	9.550	9.650	26	9.350	9.600	18	9.200	9.700	20	9.700	9.000	48	75.750	25
9	Ana Manso	9.350	9.550	45	9.300	9.100	39	9.100	9.550	29	9.550	8.950	54	74.450	39
9	Marta Artigas	9.600	9.350	40	8.950	8.950	48	9.150	9.050	43	9.600	9.150	43	73.800	46
9	Irene Martínez	9.450	9.200	56	8.750	9.250	47	8.750	9.400	45	9.550	9.205	40	73.600	48
9	Virginia Navarro	9.400	9.400	50	8.450	8.900	57	8.950	9.300	42	9.400	9.350	43	73.150	53
9	Margot Estévez	9.350	9.450	50	8.600	9.250	50	8.900	8.450	63	9.350	9.400	43	72.750	56
	Laura Bortolaso (ITA)	9.550	9.400	40	9.300	9.550	21	8.950	9.450	38	9.200	9.350	51	74.750	36
	Florence Laborderie (FRA)	9.400	9.400	50	8.750	9.400	44	9.000	8.800	56	9.150	9.250	57	73.150	53
	Lee Jung-Hee (KOR)	9.650	9.300	40	8.900	9.000	48	8.950	8.500	62	9.300	9.200	54	72.800	55
	Tatiana Figueiredo (BRA)	9.450	9.200	56	9.100	8.100	60	8.950	9.100	48	9.400	9.300	48	72.600	57
	Keri Battersby (AUS)	9.300	9.050	63	8.600	9.250	50	9.250	8.500	59	9.400	8.950	59	72.300	59
	Kellie Wilson (AUS)	9.400	9.000	62	8.150	8.800	61	9.400	9.150	33	9.400	8.900	60	72.200	60
	Nancy Goldsmith (ISR)	9.200	9.100	64	8.000	9.300	58	8.900	9.050	53	9.300	9.200	54	72.050	61
	Lena Adomat (SWE)	8.850	9.250	65	8.700	8.250	61	9.000	9.050	48	9.300	9.450	43	71.850	62
	Corinne Ragazzacci (FRA)	9.650	9.350	36	7.350	9.600	61	9.050	8.800	55	9.350	8.450	65	71.600	63
	Shim Jae-Young (KOR)	9.600	9.200	50	7.300	7.850	65	9.200	8.850	48	9.500	8.600	63	70.100	64
	Limor Friedman (ISR)	9.300	9.300	59	7.200	8.250	64	7.750	8.850	65	9.200	8.800	64	68.650	65
