= Gymnastics at the 1984 Summer Olympics – Women's artistic individual all-around =

Women's artistic individual all-around at the Games of the XXIII Olympiad
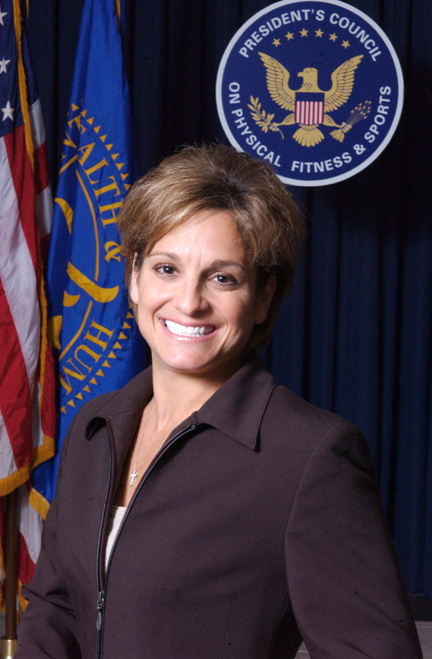
- Gold medalist Mary Lou Retton (2004)
- Venue: Pauley Pavilion
- Date: August 3, 1984
- Competitors: 65 from 19 nations
- Winning total: 79.175 points

Medalists
1st place, gold medalist(s)		Mary Lou Retton	United States
2nd place, silver medalist(s)		Ecaterina Szabo	Romania
3rd place, bronze medalist(s)		Simona Păucă	Romania

These are the results of the women's individual all-around competition, one of six events for female competitors in artistic gymnastics at the 1984 Summer Olympics in Los Angeles. The qualification and final rounds took place on July 30, August 1 and 3 at UCLA’s Pauley Pavilion.

== Results ==
Sixty-five gymnasts competed in the compulsory and optional rounds on July 30 and August 1. The 36 highest scoring gymnasts advanced to the final on August 3. Each country was limited to three competitors in the final. Half of the points earned by each gymnast during both the compulsory and optional rounds carried over to the final. This constitutes each gymnast's "prelim" score.

=== Final ===
Rank	Gymnast	Prelim	Vault	Uneven Bars	Balance Beam	Floor	Final	Total
Gold medal	Mary Lou Retton (USA)	39.525	10.000	9.850	9.800	10.000	39.650	79.175
Silver medal	Ecaterina Szabo (ROU)	39.375	9.900	9.900	10.000	9.950	39.750	79.125
Bronze medal	Simona Păucă (ROU)	39.025	9.900	9.900	9.950	9.900	39.650	78.675
4	Julianne McNamara (USA)	39.200	9.950	10.000	9.550	9.700	39.200	78.400
5	Laura Cutina (ROU)	39.200	9.900	9.900	9.400	9.900	39.100	78.300
6	Ma Yanhong (CHN)	39.100	9.650	10.000	9.800	9.300	38.750	77.850
7	Zhou Ping (CHN)	38.675	9.750	9.800	9.800	9.750	39.100	77.775
8	Chen Yongyan (CHN)	38.675	9.700	9.800	9.850	9.700	39.050	77.725
9	Romi Kessler (SUI)	38.675	9.650	9.850	9.800	9.550	38.850	77.525
10	Kathy Johnson (USA)	39.050	9.850	9.900	9.400	9.250	38.400	77.450
11	Maiko Morio (JPN)	37.950	9.800	9.800	9.550	9.750	38.900	76.850
12	Anja Wilhelm (FRG)	38.225	9.750	9.700	9.700	9.050	38.200	76.425
13	Bonnie Wittmeier (CAN)	37.925	9.600	9.650	9.600	9.500	38.450	76.375
14	Andrea Thomas (CAN)	37.925	9.550	9.750	9.350	9.650	38.300	76.225
15	Laura Muñoz (ESP)	37.875	9.800	9.350	9.800	9.400	38.350	76.225
16	Noriko Mochizuki (JPN)	37.850	9.750	9.850	9.200	9.450	38.250	76.100
17	Anita Botnen (CAN)	37.775	9.650	9.750	9.450	9.400	38.250	76.025
18	Chihiro Oyagi (JPN)	37.425	9.450	9.850	9.500	9.600	38.400	75.825
19	Natalie Davies (GBR)	37.525	9.750	9.400	9.500	9.600	38.250	75.775
20	Laura Bortolaso (ITA)	37.375	9.600	9.750	9.600	9.350	38.300	75.675
21	Ana Manso (ESP)	37.225	9.800	9.700	9.400	9.150	38.050	75.275
22	Amanda Harrison (GBR)	37.275	9.750	9.500	9.250	9.450	37.950	75.225
23	Astrid Beckers (FRG)	37.625	9.600	9.500	9.000	9.400	37.500	75.125
24	Susi Latanzio (SUI)	37.200	9.600	9.450	9.250	9.500	37.800	75.000
25	Kathleen Williams (GBR)	37.225	9.650	9.650	9.050	9.350	37.700	74.925
26	Marta Artigas (ESP)	36.900	9.700	9.650	8.950	9.250	37.550	74.450
27	Tatiana Figueiredo (BRA)	36.300	9.600	9.650	9.400	9.450	38.100	74.400
28	Florence Laborderie (FRA)	36.575	9.600	9.150	9.600	9.250	37.600	74.175
29	Natalie Seiler (SUI)	37.075	9.700	8.400	9.400	9.400	36.900	73.975
30	Lee Jung-hee (KOR)	36.400	9.650	8.950	9.150	9.600	37.350	73.750
31	Nancy Goldsmith (ISR)	36.025	9.200	9.650	9.400	9.450	37.700	73.725
32	Corinne Ragazzacci (FRA)	35.800	9.800	9.800	8.550	9.300	37.450	73.250
33	Kerri Battersby (AUS)	36.150	9.300	9.550	8.550	9.10	36.500	72.650
34	Kellie Wilson (AUS)	36.100	9.250	9.450	8.150	9.400	36.250	72.350
35	Lena Adomat (SWE)	35.925	9.550	9.150	7.300	9.400	35.400	71.325
36	Elke Heine (FRG)	38.275	9.750	9.700	0.000	0.000	19.450	57.725
