= List of Olympic female artistic gymnasts for China =

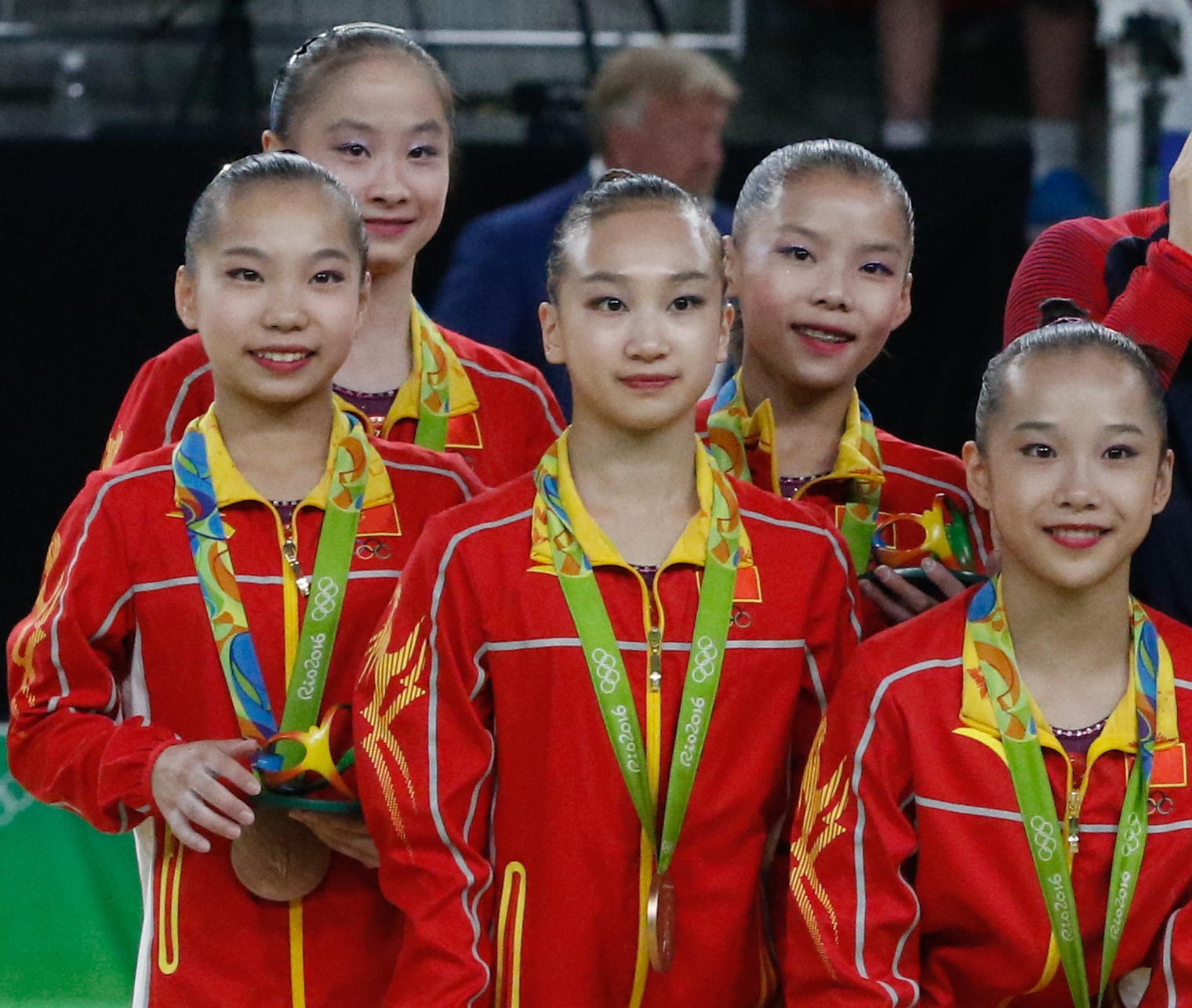
Chinese women at the 2016 Olympic Games

Gymnastics events have been staged at the Olympic Games since 1896, with women competing for the time at the 1928 Olympic Games. Chinese female artistic gymnasts first competed at the 1984 Olympic Games and have competed at every subsequent Olympic Games. China was stripped of their team bronze medal in 2000 after it was discovered that one of their gymnasts was underage.

== Gymnasts ==
Gymnast	Years
Bi Wenjing	1996
Chen Cuiting	1988
Chen Yongyan	1984
Cheng Fei	2004, 2008
Deng Linlin	2008, 2012
Dong Fangxiao	2000
Fan Di	1988
Fan Ye	2004
Fan Yilin	2016, 2020
Guan Chenchen	2020
He Kexin	2008, 2012
He Xuemei	1992
Huang Mandan	2000
Huang Qiushuang	2012
Huang Qun	1984
Ji Liya	1996
Jiang Yuyuan	2008
Kui Yuanyuan	1996, 2000
Li Li	1992
Li Shanshan	2008
Li Ya	2004
Li Yifang	1992
Lin Li	2004
Ling Jie	2000
Liu Xuan	1996, 2000
Lu Li	1992
Lu Yufei	2020
Luo Huan	2024
Ma Yanhong	1984
Ma Ying	1988
Mao Yanling	1996
Mao Yi	2016
Mo Huilan	1996
Ou Yushan	2020, 2024
Qiao Ya	1996
Qiu Qiyuan	2024
Shang Chunsong	2016
Sui Lu	2012
Tan Jiaxin	2016
Tang Xijing	2020
Wang Huiying	1988
Wang Tiantian	2004
Wang Wenjing	1988
Wang Xiaoyan	1988
Wang Yan	2016
Wu Jiani	1984
Yang Bo	1992
Yang Yilin	2008
Yang Yun	2000
Yao Jinnan	2012
Zhang Jin	2020
Zhang Nan	2004
Zhang Xia	1992
Zhang Yihan	2024
Zhou Ping	1984
Zhou Qiurui	1984
Zhou Yaqin	2024

== Medalists ==
Medal	Name	Year	Event
Bronze	Chen, Huang, Ma, Wu, Zhou, Zhou	(United States) 1984 Los Angeles	Women's team
Gold	Ma Yanhong	(United States) 1984 Los Angeles	Women's uneven bars
Gold	Lu Li	(Spain) 1992 Barcelona	Women's uneven bars
Silver	Lu Li	(Spain) 1992 Barcelona	Women's balance beam
Silver	Mo Huilan	(United States) 1996 Atlanta	Women's vault
Silver	Bi Wenjing	(United States) 1996 Atlanta	Women's uneven bars
Bronze	Liu Xuan	(Australia) 2000 Sydney	Women's all-around
Silver	Ling Jie	(Australia) 2000 Sydney	Women's uneven bars
Bronze	Yang Yun	(Australia) 2000 Sydney	Women's uneven bars
Gold	Liu Xuan	(Australia) 2000 Sydney	Women's balance beam
Bronze	Zhang Nan	(Greece) 2004 Athens	Women's all-around
Gold	Cheng, Deng, He, Jiang, Li, Yang	(China) 2008 Beijing	Women's team
Bronze	Yang Yilin	(China) 2008 Beijing	Women's all-around
Bronze	Cheng Fei	(China) 2008 Beijing	Women's vault
Gold	He Kexin	(China) 2008 Beijing	Women's uneven bars
Bronze	Yang Yilin	(China) 2008 Beijing	Women's uneven bars
Bronze	Cheng Fei	(China) 2008 Beijing	Women's balance beam
Silver	He Kexin	(United Kingdom) 2012 London	Women's uneven bars
Gold	Deng Linlin	(United Kingdom) 2012 London	Women's balance beam
Silver	Sui Lu	(United Kingdom) 2012 London	Women's balance beam
Bronze	Fan, Mao, Shang, Tan, Wang	(Brazil) 2016 Rio de Janeiro	Women's team
Gold	Guan Chenchen	(Japan) 2020 Tokyo	Women's balance beam
Silver	Tang Xijing	(Japan) 2020 Tokyo	Women's balance beam
Silver	Qiu Qiyuan	(France) 2024 Paris	Women's uneven bars
Silver	Zhou Yaqin	(France) 2024 Paris	Women's balance beam

== Gallery ==
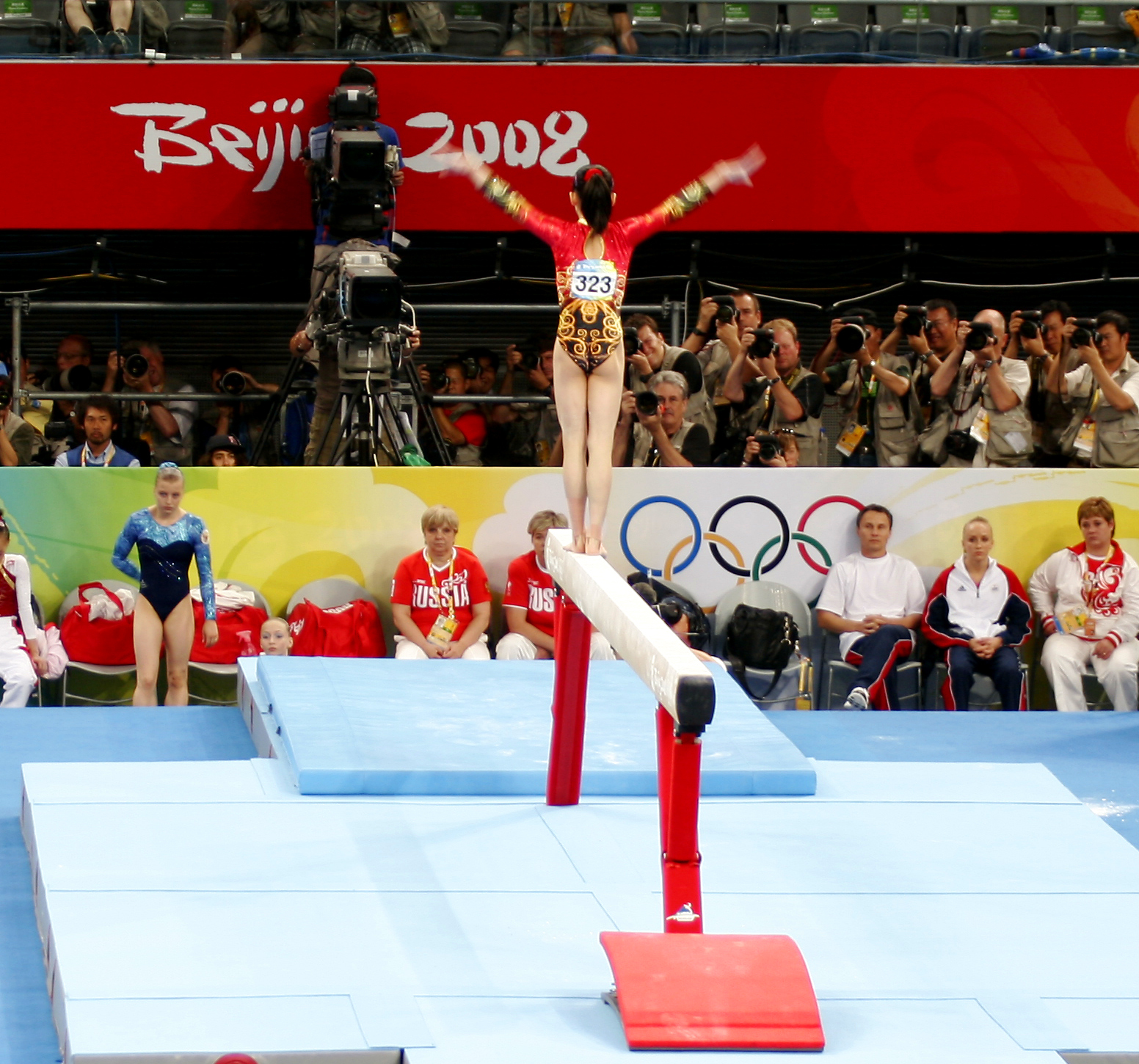
Jiang Yuyuan, 2008

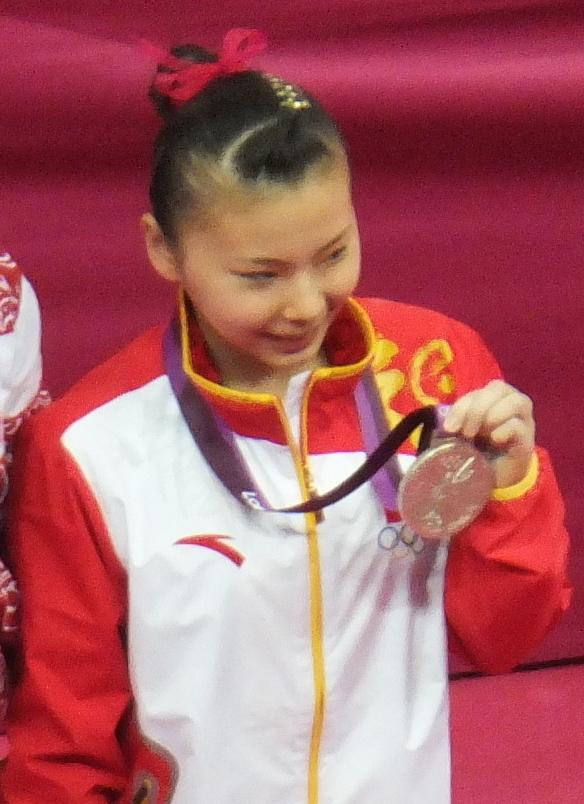
He Kexin, 2012

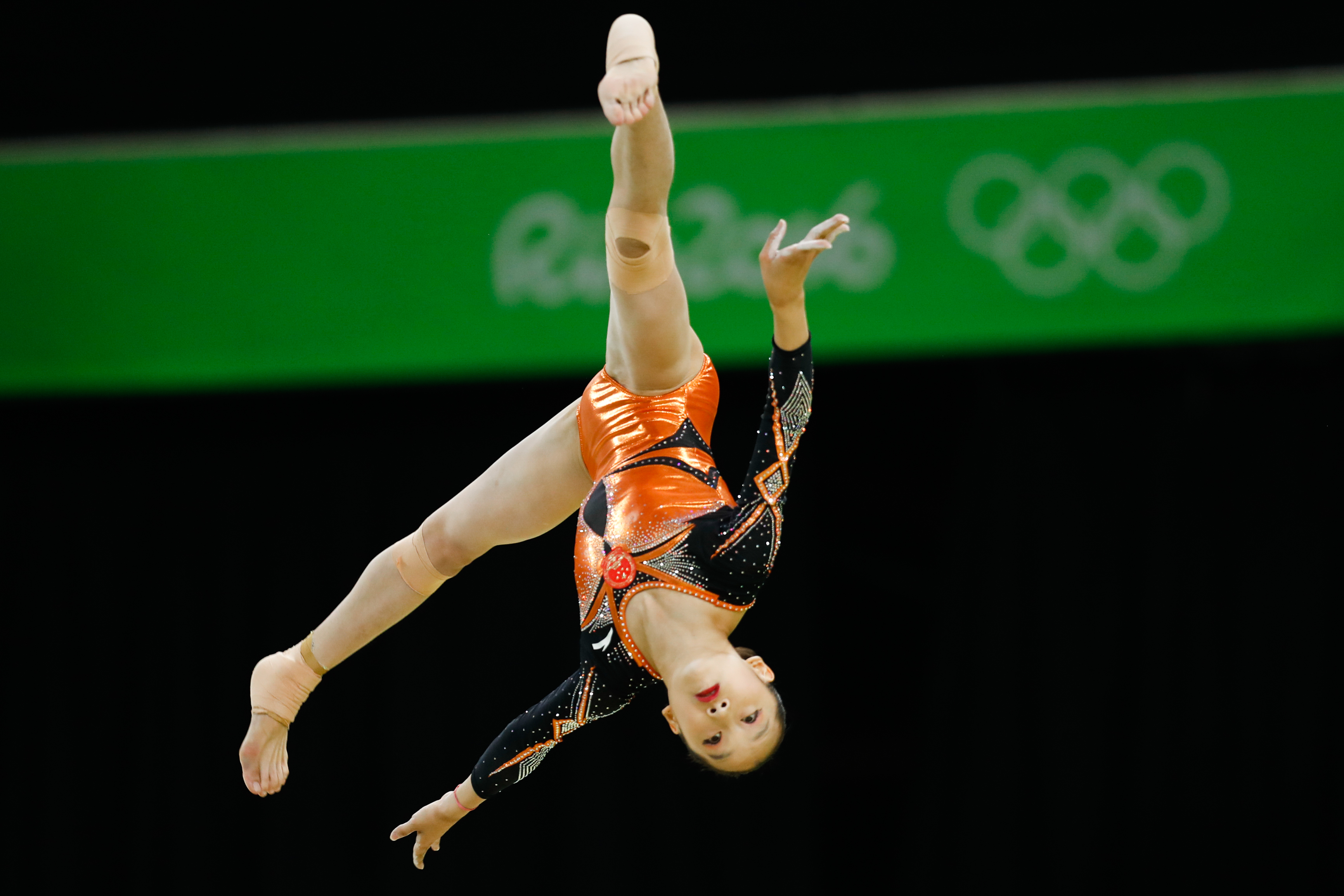
Fan Yilin, 2016

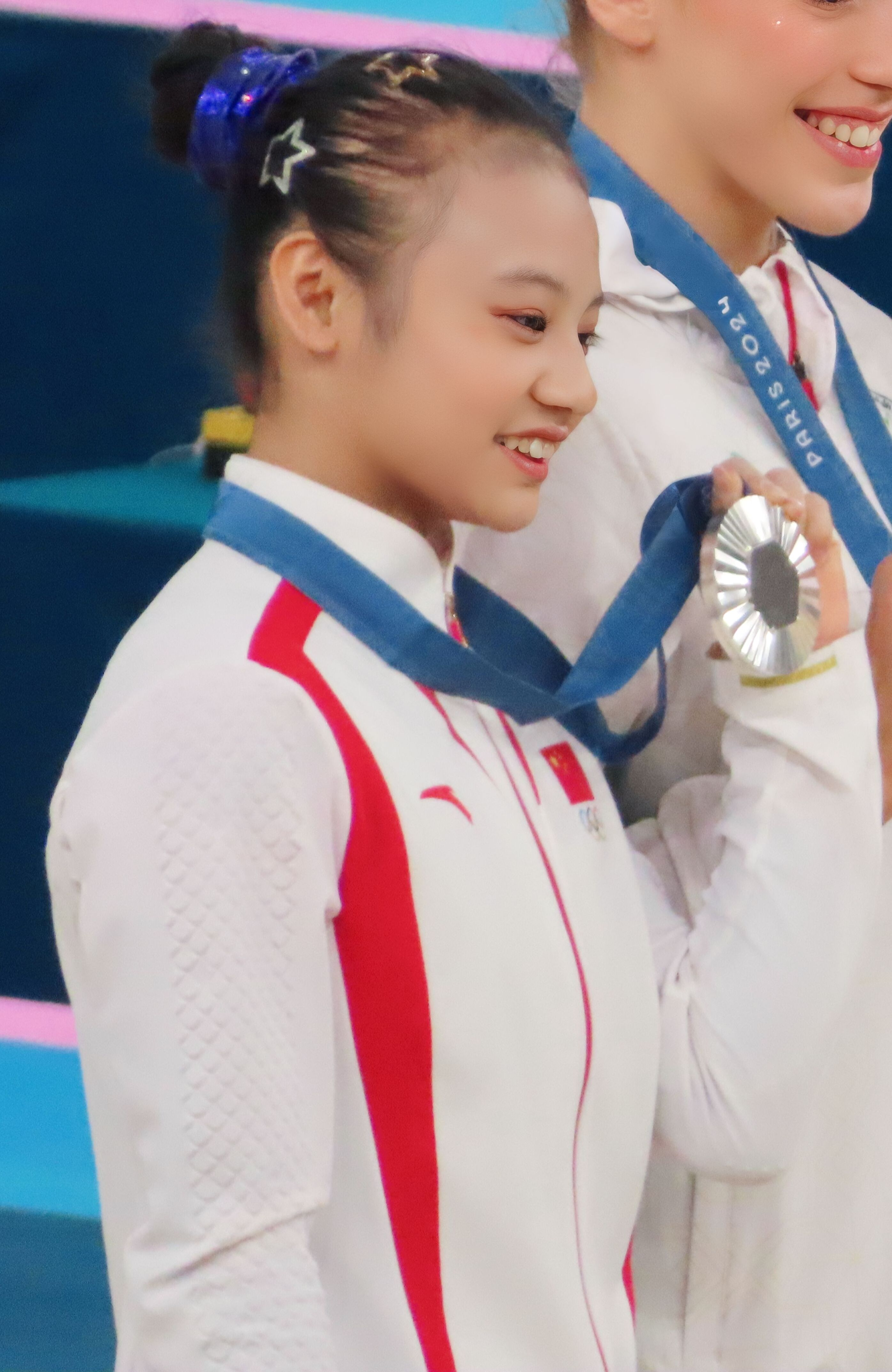
Qiu Qiyuan, 2024

Chinese artistic gymnasts at the Summer Olympics

== See also ==
- China women's national gymnastics team
