= China women's national artistic gymnastics team =

China
- Continental union: Asian Gymnastics Union
- National federation: Chinese Gymnastics Association

Olympic Games
- Appearances: 11
- Medals: Gold: 2008; Bronze: 1984, 2016

World Championships
- Appearances: 19
- Medals: Gold: 2006, 2026; Silver: 1981, 1995, 2007, 2014, 2015; Bronze: 1989, 1997, 2010, 2011, 2018

Junior World Championships
- Appearances: 3
- Medals: Silver: 2019

Youth Olympic Games
- Medals: Gold: 2026

The China women's national artistic gymnastics team represents China in FIG international competitions.

== History ==
China has participated in the Olympic Games women's team competition ten times. It has won three medals, including the gold medal in 2008. The team has also won seven medals at the World Artistic Gymnastics Championships, including the gold medal in 2006.

== Team competition results ==
=== Olympic Games ===
Year	Position	Squad
1928 through 1980 — did not participate
1984	bronze medal	Ma Yanhong, Wu Jiani, Chen Yongyan, Zhou Ping, Zhou Qiurui, Huang Qun
1988	6th place	Chen Cuiting, Fan Di, Wang Wenjing, Wang Huiying, Ma Ying, Wang Xiaoyan
1992	4th place	Yang Bo, Lu Li, Li Yifang, Li Li, He Xuemei, Zhang Xia
1996	4th place	Mo Huilan, Mao Yanling, Qiao Ya, Liu Xuan, Ji Liya, Kui Yuanyuan, Bi Wenjing
2000	disqualified (Note: China originally placed third at both the 1999 World Championships and the 2000 Olympic Games. In 2008, it was discovered that Chinese officials falsified the age of team member Dong Fangxiao; the team was officially disqualified in March 2012, with the bronze medals being awarded to Ukraine (1999) and the United States (2000), and Dong's results from both competitions were struck from the records.)	Yang Yun, Ling Jie, Dong Fangxiao, Liu Xuan, Huang Mandan, Kui Yuanyuan
2004	7th place	Cheng Fei, Fan Ye, Li Ya, Lin Li, Wang Tiantian, Zhang Nan
2008	gold medal	Yang Yilin, Cheng Fei, Jiang Yuyuan, Deng Linlin, He Kexin, Li Shanshan
2012	4th place	Huang Qiushuang, Deng Linlin, Sui Lu, Yao Jinnan, He Kexin
2016	bronze medal	Shang Chunsong, Wang Yan, Fan Yilin, Tan Jiaxin, Mao Yi
2020	7th place	Lu Yufei, Ou Yushan, Tang Xijing, Zhang Jin
2024	6th place	Luo Huan, Ou Yushan, Qiu Qiyuan, Zhang Yihan, Zhou Yaqin

=== World Championships ===
Year	Position	Squad
1979	4th Place	He Xiumin, Li Cuiling, Liu Yajun, Ma Yanhong, Zheng Sihua, Zhu Zheng
1981	silver medal	Chen Yongyan, Ma Yanhong, Li Cuiling, Wen Jia, Wu Jiani, Zhu Zheng
1983	5th Place	Chen Yongyan, Ma Yanhong, Wang Xiaoyan, Wu Jiani, Yang Yanli, Zhou Qiurui
1985	7th Place	Huang Qun,Qin Qizhi,Wang Xiaoyan,Xu Yemei, Yan Yanli, Yufeng
1987	4th place	Chen Cuiting, Fan Di, Wang Xiaoyan, Luo Feng, Ma Ying, Wang Huiying
1989	bronze medal	Yang Bo, Chen Cuiting, Fan Di, Li Yan, Wang Wenjing, Ma Ying
1991	4th place	Shi Liying, Li Li, Li Yifang, Li Yan, Yang Bo, Zhang Wenning
1994	4th place	Mo Huilan, Yuan Kexia, Liu Xuan, He Xuemei, Guang Yuging, Ye Linlin, Qiao Ya
1995	silver medal	Mo Huilan, Mao Yanling, Meng Fei, Qiao Ya, Liu Xuan, Ye Linlin, Ji Liya
1997	bronze medal	Bi Wenjing, Kui Yuanyuan, Liu Xuan, Meng Fei, Mo Huilan, Zhou Duan
1999	Disqualified	Bai Chunyue, Dong Fangxiao, Huang Mandan, Ling Jie, Liu Xuan, Xu Jing
2001	Did not participate	
2003	4th place	Fan Ye, Kang Xin, Li Ya, Lin Li, Wang Tiantian, Zhang Nan
2006	gold medal	Cheng Fei, He Ning, Li Ya, Pang Panpan, Zhang Nan, Zhou Zhuoru
2007	silver medal	Cheng Fei, He Ning, Jiang Yuyuan, Li Shanshan, Xiao Sha, Yang Yilin
2010	bronze medal	Deng Linlin, He Kexin, Huang Qiushuang, Jiang Yuyuan, Sui Lu, Yang Yilin
2011	bronze medal	He Kexin, Huang Qiushuang, Jiang Yuyuan, Sui Lu, Tan Sixin, Yao Jinnan
2014	silver medal	Bai Yawen, Chen Siyi, Huang Huidan, Shang Chunsong, Tan Jiaxin, Yao Jinnan
2015	silver medal	Chen Siyi, Fan Yilin, Mao Yi, Shang Chunsong, Tan Jiaxin, Wang Yan
2018	bronze medal	Chen Yile, Liu Jinru, Liu Tingting, Luo Huan, Zhang Jin
2019	4th place	Chen Yile, Li Shijia, Liu Tingting, Qi Qi, Tang Xijing
2022	6th place	Luo Rui, Ou Yushan, Tang Xijing, Wei Xiaoyuan, Zhang Jin
2023	4th place	Huang Zhuofan, Ou Yushan, Qiu Qiyuan, Zhang Qingying, Zhou Yaqin
2026	gold medal	Du Siyu, Ke Qinqin, Qiu Qiyuan, Zhang Qingying, Zhang Yihan

=== Junior World Championships ===
Year	Position	Squad
2019	silver medal	Guan Chenchen, Ou Yushan, Wei Xiaoyuan, Wu Ran
2023	6th place	Jiang Shuxuan, Qin Xinyi, Yu Hanyue
2025	4th place	Huang Ziyi, Jiang Shuting, Xiang Yina, Qin Ziyue

== Most decorated gymnasts ==
This list includes all Chinese female artistic gymnasts who have won at least four medals at the Olympic Games and the World Artistic Gymnastics Championships combined.

Rank	Gymnast	Years	Team	AA	VT	UB	BB	FX	Olympic Total	World Total	Total
1	Cheng Fei	2005–2008	2008; 2006; 2007		2008; 2005; 2006; 2007		2008	2006	3	6	9
2	He Kexin	2008–2012	2008; 2010; 2011			2008; 2012; 2009			3	3	6
3	Sui Lu	2009–2012	2010; 2011				2012; 2011	2011; 2009	1	5	6
4	Yang Yilin	2007–2010	2008; 2007; 2010	2008		2008; 2007			3	3	6
5	Deng Linlin	2008–2012	2008; 2010				2012; 2009; 2010		2	3	5
6	Ma Yanhong	1979–1984	1984; 1981			1984; 1979; 1981			2	3	5
7	Mo Huilan	1995–1997	1995; 1997		1996	1995	1995		1	4	5
8	Jiang Yuyuan	2007–2011	2008; 2007; 2010; 2011	2010					1	4	5
8	Yao Jinnan	2011–2014	2014; 2011	2011		2014	2011		0	5	5
10	Liu Xuan	1995–2000	1995; 1997	2000			2000; 1996		2	3	5
11	Fan Yilin	2015–2017	2016; 2015			2015; 2017			1	3	4
11	Zhang Qingying	2025–2026	2026	2025			2025; 2026		0	4	4

== See also ==
- List of Olympic female artistic gymnasts for China
