= List of Olympic female artistic gymnasts for the United States =

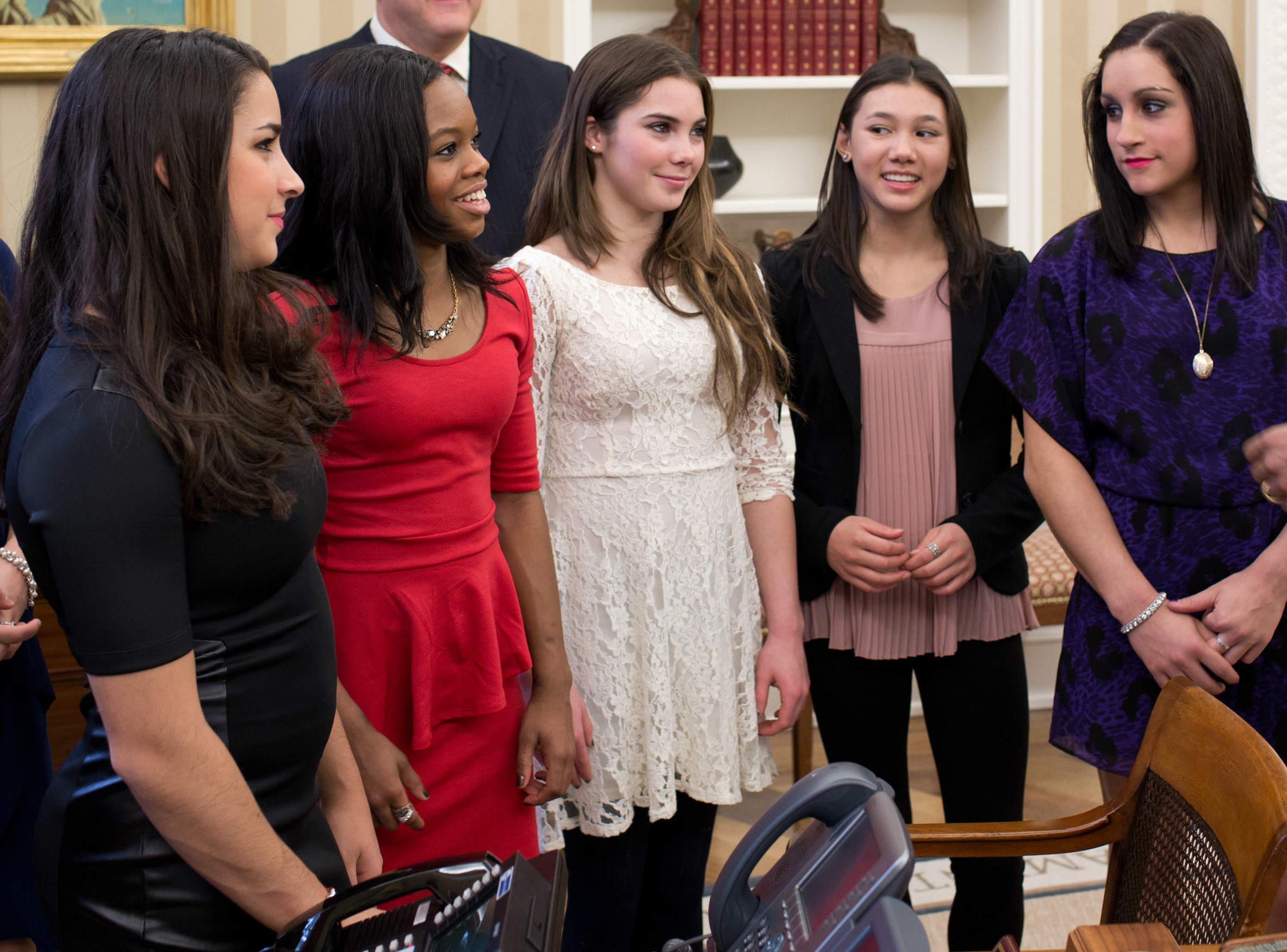
2012 Olympic Team, the "Fierce Five" at the White House

Gymnastics events have been staged at the Olympic Games since 1896, but women's events first appeared in 1928. American female gymnasts have participated in every Olympic Games since 1936, except for 1980. A total of 90 female gymnasts have represented the United States. American women have won 62 medals at the Olympics – 11 in team all-around, 11 in individual all-around, 7 in vault, 10 in uneven bars, 11 in balance beam, and 12 in floor exercise. The medals include 19 golds. The U.S. has medaled in the team all-around in every Summer Olympics since 1992, winning golds in 1996, 2012, 2016, and 2024.

Eight American female gymnasts have won at least four medals at the Olympic Games the most of which was Simone Biles's tally of eleven total medal (including seven gold medals). Other top medalists include: Shannon Miller (seven), Sunisa Lee (six), Aly Raisman (six), Nastia Liukin (five), Mary Lou Retton (five), Dominique Dawes (four), and Shawn Johnson (four).

In 1984, Mary Lou Retton became the first American female gymnast to win the individual all-around gold medal at the Olympics. She won five total medals that year in the only Olympic Games she participated in.

Shannon Miller, who competed at the 1992 and 1996 Olympics, won seven total Olympic medals, which was the most of any American female gymnast before the 2021 Olympics in which Simone Biles tied for the number of Olympic medals won. Miller won five medals in 1992 and added two more in 1996. Dominique Dawes competed at the 1992, 1996, and 2000 Olympics, winning four medals. Miller and Dawes were both members of the "Magnificent Seven", the 1996 team that became the first American squad to win the team all-around gold medal at the Olympics. The competition was highlighted by Kerri Strug sticking a vault while injured to ensure the U.S. victory.

Nastia Liukin and Shawn Johnson won five and four medals, respectively, in 2008, the only Olympics that either one participated in. Liukin won the individual all-around gold medal, and Johnson won the balance beam gold medal.

In 2012 the U.S. won the team gold medal for the second time. This team, which was nicknamed the "Fierce Five", featured five gymnasts who were all making their first appearance at the Olympics. That year, Gabby Douglas won the gold medal in individual all-around, and Aly Raisman won the gold medal on floor exercise and the bronze medal on balance beam. McKayla Maroney won silver on vault.

In 2016 the U.S. won the team gold medal for the second consecutive Olympics, and the third title overall. The team was nicknamed "The Final Five" (as the team members were the last 5 who competed under Marta Karolyi) and featured the return of 2012 Olympic gold medalists Gabby Douglas and Aly Raisman. It also featured newcomers Laurie Hernandez, Madison Kocian, and three-time reigning world all-around champion Simone Biles. Biles won the individual all-around, vault, and floor exercise gold medals, and also took bronze on the balance beam. Raisman won silver medals in the all-around and floor exercise. Hernandez took the silver on the balance beam while Kocian, the reigning uneven bars world co-champion, won silver on that event. The 2016 Olympics were the most successful games to date for the United States in women's gymnastics, with four golds, four silvers, and one bronze medal overall.

For the 2020 Olympics (held in 2021 due to COVID-19), the U.S. women's team earned the team silver medal. Simone Biles was the only gymnast from the previous Olympics to return to the team. Sunisa Lee became the individual all-around champion, the sixth women from the U.S. to do so. Lee also won the bronze on uneven bars, Biles won bronze on balance beam, MyKayla Skinner won silver on Vault, and Jade Carey won gold on floor exercise.

Four U.S. Olympic gymnasts returned to the 2024 Olympics - Simone Biles, Jade Carey, Jordan Chiles and Sunisa Lee. In addition, 16 year old Hezly Rivera was chosen for the team. The five won the team all-around gold medal, while Biles and Lee won the gold and bronze individual all-around medals, respectively. Biles went on to win gold on vault and silver on floor exercise, while Lee won the bronze on uneven bars and Carey won bronze on vault.

== Gymnasts ==
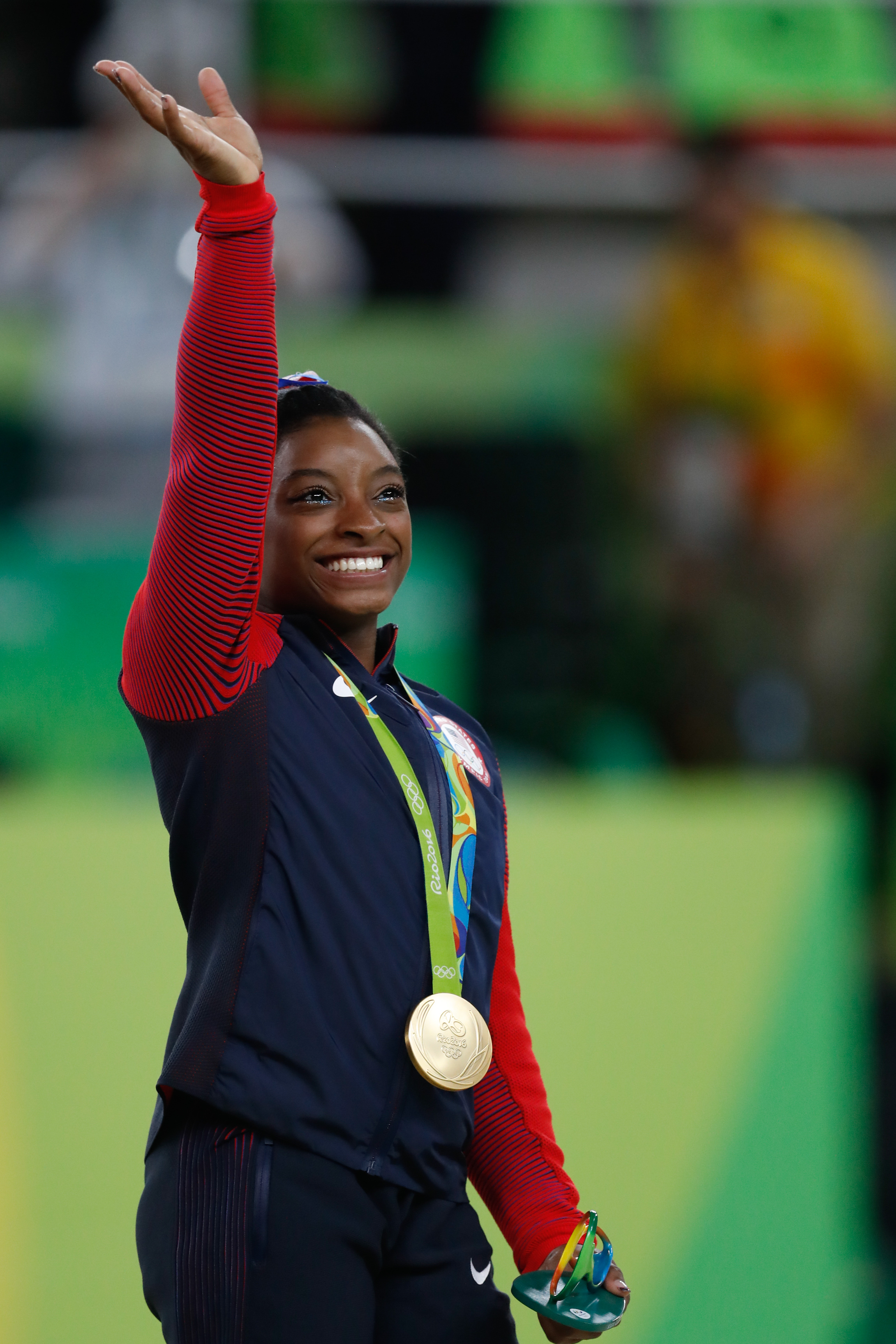
Simone Biles

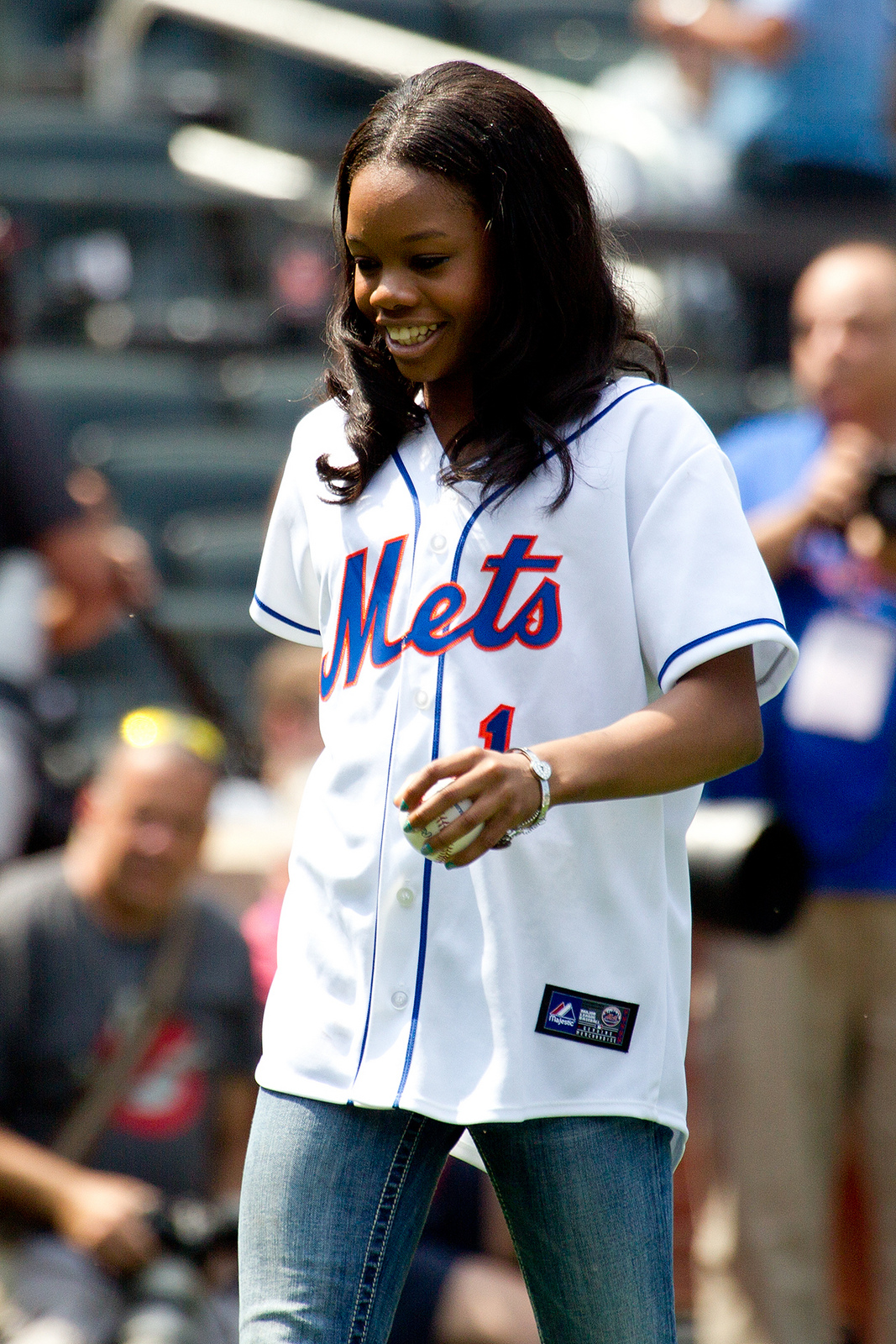
Gabby Douglas

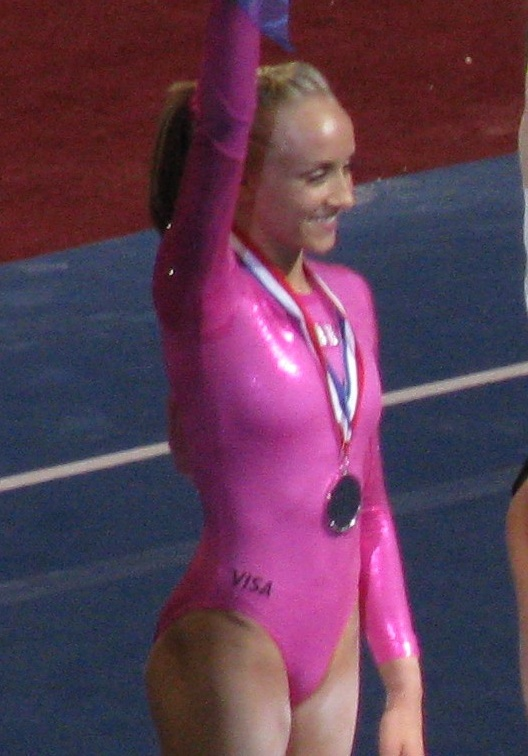
Nastia Liukin

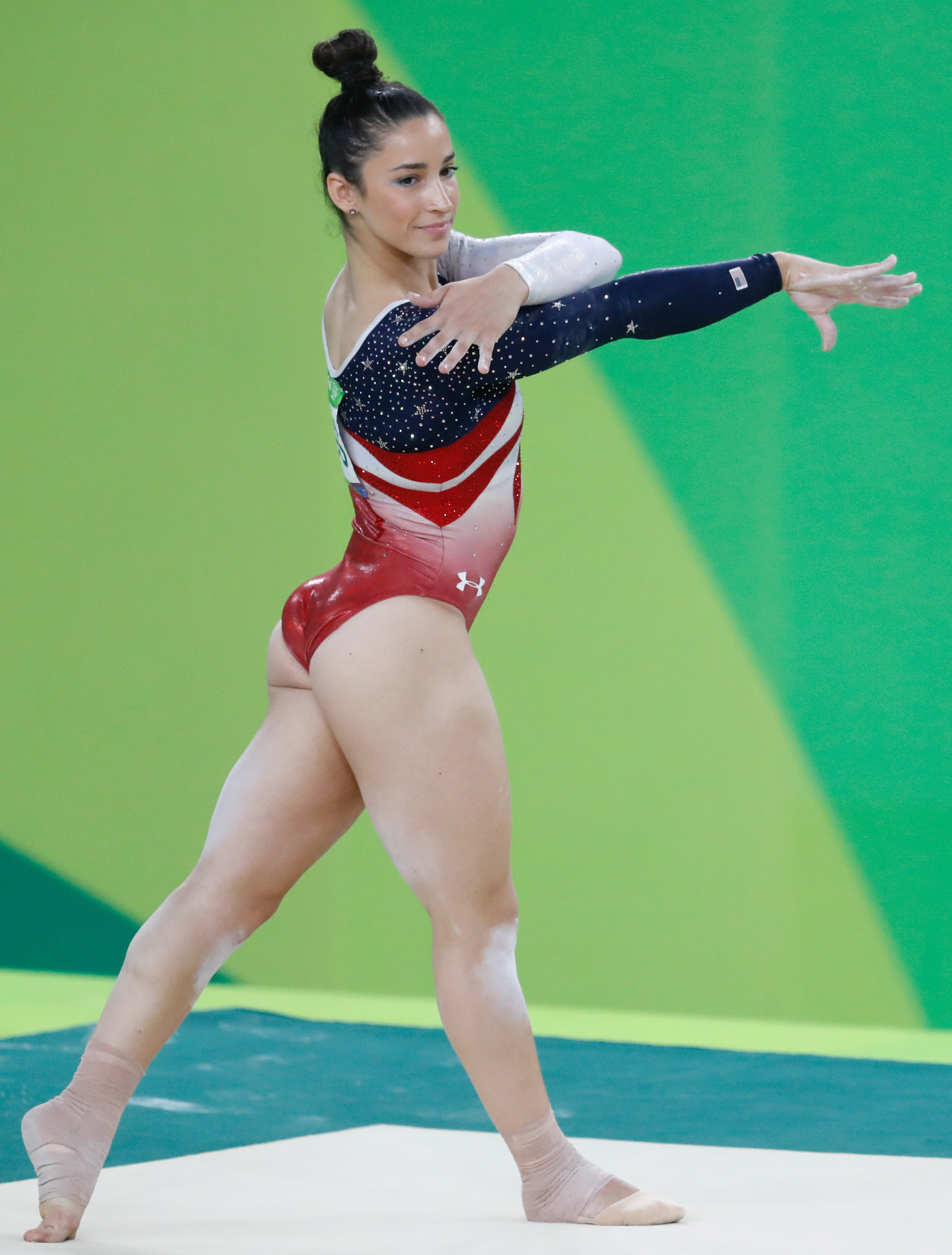
Aly Raisman

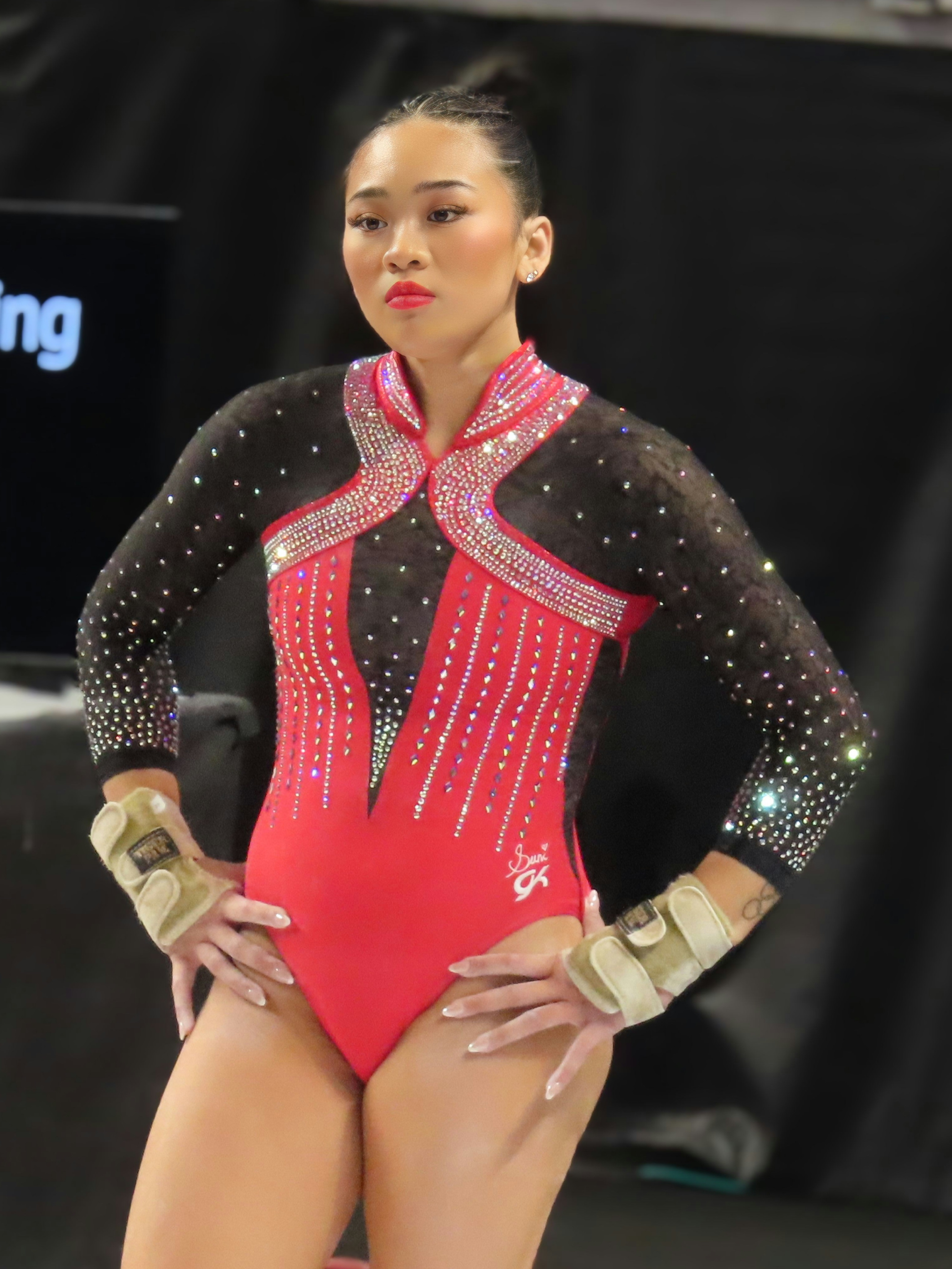
Sunisa Lee

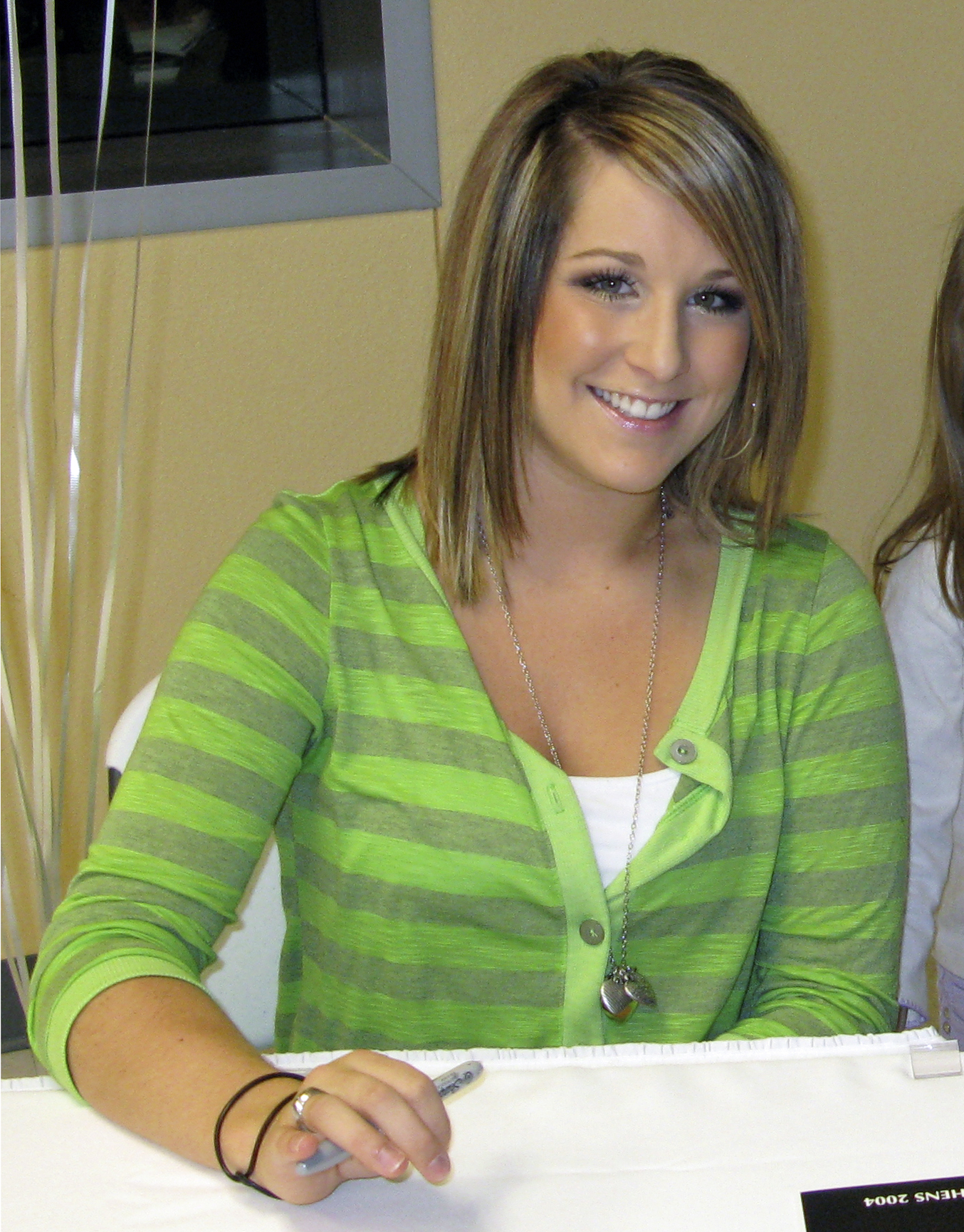
Carly Patterson

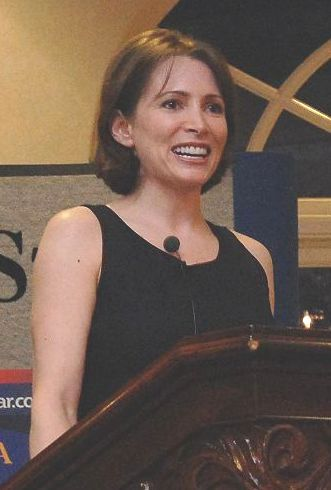
Shannon Miller

Gymnast	Years	Gold	Silver	Bronze	Total medals	Age at Last Olympics	Ref.
Marian Barone	1948, 1952	0	0	1	1	28	
Mohini Bhardwaj	2004	0	1	0	1	25	
Pam Bileck	1984	0	1	0	1	15	
Simone Biles	2016, 2020, 2024	7	2	2	11	27	
Amanda Borden	1996	1	0	0	1	19	
Wendy Bruce	1992	0	0	1	1	19	
Jade Carey	2020, 2024	2	0	1	3	24	
Kolleen Casey	1976	0	0	0	0	16	
Kimberly Chace	1972, 1976	0	0	0	0	20	
Jordan Chiles	2020, 2024	1	1	0	2	23	
Amy Chow	1996, 2000	1	1	1	3	22	
Wendy Cluff	1968	0	0	0	0	17	
Kathy Corrigan	1964	0	0	0	0	19	
Dorothy Dalton	1948, 1952	0	0	1	1	29	
Jamie Dantzscher	2000	0	0	1	1	18	
Dominique Dawes	1992, 1996, 2000	1	0	3	4	23	
Gabby Douglas	2012, 2016	3	0	0	3	20	
Michelle Dusserre	1984	0	1	0	1	15	
Meta Elste-Neumann	1948, 1952	0	0	1	1	32	
Carrie Englert	1976	0	0	0	0	18	
Doris Fuchs	1956, 1960	0	0	0	0	22	
Kelly Garrison	1988	0	0	0	0	21	
Kathy Gleason	1968	0	0	0	0	19	
Muriel Grossfeld	1956, 1960, 1964	0	0	0	0	24	
Ruth Grulkowski	1952	0	0	0	0	21	
Annia Hatch	2004	0	2	0	2	26	
Laurie Hernandez	2016	1	1	0	2	16	
Marie Hoesly	1952	0	0	0	0	35	
Kathy Howard	1976	0	0	0	0	18	
Judy Howe	1956	0	0	0	0	21	
Terin Humphrey	2004	0	2	0	2	17	
Brandy Johnson	1988	0	0	0	0	15	
Kathy Johnson	1984	0	1	1	2	24	
Shawn Johnson	2008	1	3	0	4	16	
Doris Kirkman	1952	0	0	0	0	22	
Jackie Klein	1956	0	0	0	0	19	
Madison Kocian	2016	1	1	0	2	19	
Courtney Kupets	2004	0	1	1	2	18	
Sunisa Lee	2020, 2024	2	1	3	6	21	
Nastia Liukin	2008	1	3	1	5	18	
Kristen Maloney	2000	0	0	1	1	19	
Melissa Marlowe	1988	0	0	0	0	16	
McKayla Maroney	2012	1	1	0	2	16	
Betty-Jean Maycock	1960	0	0	0	0	17	
Dorothy McClements	1964	0	0	0	0	19	
Courtney McCool	2004	0	1	0	1	16	
Grace McCallum	2020	0	1	0	1	18	
Julianne McNamara	1984	1	2	0	3	18	
Chellsie Memmel	2008	0	1	0	1	20	
Linda Metheny	1964, 1968, 1972	0	0	0	0	25	
Shannon Miller	1992, 1996	2	2	3	7	19	
Phoebe Mills	1988	0	0	1	1	15	
Dominique Moceanu	1996	1	0	0	1	14	
Theresa Montefusco	1960	0	0	0	0	19	
Joan Moore	1972	0	0	0	0	18	
Colleen Mulvihill	1968	0	0	0	0	16	
Betty Okino	1992	0	0	1	1	17	
Carly Patterson	2004	1	2	0	3	16	
Samantha Peszek	2008	0	1	0	1	16	
Jaycie Phelps	1996	1	0	0	1	16	
Roxanne Pierce	1972	0	0	0	0	17	
Joyce Racek	1956	0	0	0	0	18	
Aly Raisman	2012, 2016	3	2	1	6	22	
Elise Ray	2000	0	0	1	1	18	
Mary Lou Retton	1984	1	2	2	5	16	
Sharon Richardson	1960	0	0	0	0	17	
Cathy Rigby	1968, 1972	0	0	0	0	19	
Hezly Rivera	2024	1	0	0	1	16	
Kyla Ross	2012	1	0	0	1	15	
Sandra Ruddick	1956	0	0	0	0	24	
Alicia Sacramone	2008	0	1	0	1	20	
Clara Schroth	1948, 1952	0	0	1	1	31	
Tasha Schwikert	2000	0	0	1	1	15	
MyKayla Skinner	2020	0	1	0	1	24	
Bridget Sloan	2008	0	1	0	1	16	
Gail Sontgerath	1960	0	0	0	0	16	
Janie Speaks	1964	0	0	0	0	16	
Hope Spivey	1988	0	0	0	0	17	
Chelle Stack	1988	0	0	0	0	15	
Kerri Strug	1992, 1996	1	0	1	2	18	
Tracee Talavera	1984	0	1	0	1	17	
Joyce Tanac	1968	0	0	0	0	18	
Nancy Thies	1972	0	0	0	0	15	
Ruth Topalian	1952	0	0	0	0	25	
Marie Walther	1964	0	0	0	0	19	
Jordyn Wieber	2012	1	0	0	1	17	
Debra Willcox	1976	0	0	0	0	16	
Leslie Wolfsberger	1976	0	0	0	0	17	
Kim Zmeskal	1992	0	0	1	1	16	

== Medalists ==
Medal	Name	Year	Event
Bronze	Bakanic, Barone, Lenz, Dalton, Elste, Schifano, Schroth, Simonis	(United Kingdom) 1948 London	Women's team
Silver	Bileck, Dusserre, Johnson, McNamara, Retton, Talavera	(United States) 1984 Los Angeles	Women's team
Gold	Mary Lou Retton	(United States) 1984 Los Angeles	Women's all-around
Silver	Mary Lou Retton	(United States) 1984 Los Angeles	Women's vault
Gold	Julianne McNamara	(United States) 1984 Los Angeles	Women's uneven bars
Bronze	Mary Lou Retton	(United States) 1984 Los Angeles	Women's uneven bars
Bronze	Kathy Johnson	(United States) 1984 Los Angeles	Women's balance beam
Silver	Julianne McNamara	(United States) 1984 Los Angeles	Women's floor exercise
Bronze	Mary Lou Retton	(United States) 1984 Los Angeles	Women's floor exercise
Bronze	Phoebe Mills	(South Korea) 1988 Seoul	Women's balance beam
Bronze	Bruce, Dawes, Miller, Okino, Strug, Zmeskal	(Spain) 1992 Barcelona	Women's team
Silver	Shannon Miller	(Spain) 1992 Barcelona	Women's all-around
Bronze	Shannon Miller	(Spain) 1992 Barcelona	Women's uneven bars
Silver	Shannon Miller	(Spain) 1992 Barcelona	Women's balance beam
Bronze	Shannon Miller	(Spain) 1992 Barcelona	Women's floor exercise
Gold	Borden, Chow, Dawes, Miller, Moceanu, Phelps, Strug	(United States) 1996 Atlanta	Women's team
Silver	Amy Chow	(United States) 1996 Atlanta	Women's uneven bars
Gold	Shannon Miller	(United States) 1996 Atlanta	Women's balance beam
Bronze	Dominique Dawes	(United States) 1996 Atlanta	Women's floor exercise
Bronze	Chow, Dantzscher, Dawes, Maloney, Ray, Schwikert	(Australia) 2000 Sydney	Women's team
Silver	Bhardwaj, Hatch, Humphrey, Kupets, McCool, Patterson	(Greece) 2004 Athens	Women's team
Gold	Carly Patterson	(Greece) 2004 Athens	Women's all-around
Silver	Annia Hatch	(Greece) 2004 Athens	Women's vault
Silver	Terin Humphrey	(Greece) 2004 Athens	Women's uneven bars
Bronze	Courtney Kupets	(Greece) 2004 Athens	Women's uneven bars
Silver	Carly Patterson	(Greece) 2004 Athens	Women's balance beam
Silver	Johnson, Liukin, Memmel, Peszek, Sacramone, Sloan	(China) 2008 Beijing	Women's team
Gold	Nastia Liukin	(China) 2008 Beijing	Women's all-around
Silver	Shawn Johnson	(China) 2008 Beijing	Women's all-around
Silver	Nastia Liukin	(China) 2008 Beijing	Women's uneven bars
Gold	Shawn Johnson	(China) 2008 Beijing	Women's balance beam
Silver	Nastia Liukin	(China) 2008 Beijing	Women's balance beam
Silver	Shawn Johnson	(China) 2008 Beijing	Women's floor exercise
Bronze	Nastia Liukin	(China) 2008 Beijing	Women's floor exercise
Gold	Douglas, Maroney, Raisman, Ross, Wieber	(United Kingdom) 2012 London	Women's team
Gold	Gabby Douglas	(United Kingdom) 2012 London	Women's all-around
Silver	McKayla Maroney	(United Kingdom) 2012 London	Women's vault
Bronze	Aly Raisman	(United Kingdom) 2012 London	Women's balance beam
Gold	Aly Raisman	(United Kingdom) 2012 London	Women's floor exercise
Gold	Biles, Douglas, Hernandez, Kocian, Raisman	(Brazil) 2016 Rio de Janeiro	Women's team
Gold	Simone Biles	(Brazil) 2016 Rio de Janeiro	Women's all-around
Silver	Aly Raisman	(Brazil) 2016 Rio de Janeiro	Women's all-around
Gold	Simone Biles	(Brazil) 2016 Rio de Janeiro	Women's vault
Silver	Madison Kocian	(Brazil) 2016 Rio de Janeiro	Women's uneven bars
Silver	Laurie Hernandez	(Brazil) 2016 Rio de Janeiro	Women's balance beam
Bronze	Simone Biles	(Brazil) 2016 Rio de Janeiro	Women's balance beam
Gold	Simone Biles	(Brazil) 2016 Rio de Janeiro	Women's floor exercise
Silver	Aly Raisman	(Brazil) 2016 Rio de Janeiro	Women's floor exercise
Silver	Biles, Chiles, Lee, McCallum	(Japan) 2020 Tokyo	Women's team
Gold	Sunisa Lee	(Japan) 2020 Tokyo	Women's all-around
Silver	MyKayla Skinner	(Japan) 2020 Tokyo	Women's vault
Bronze	Sunisa Lee	(Japan) 2020 Tokyo	Women's uneven bars
Bronze	Simone Biles	(Japan) 2020 Tokyo	Women's balance beam
Gold	Jade Carey	(Japan) 2020 Tokyo	Women's floor exercise
Gold	Biles, Carey, Chiles, Lee, Rivera	(France) 2024 Paris	Women's team
Gold	Simone Biles	(France) 2024 Paris	Women's all-around
Bronze	Sunisa Lee	(France) 2024 Paris	Women's all-around
Gold	Simone Biles	(France) 2024 Paris	Women's vault
Bronze	Jade Carey	(France) 2024 Paris	Women's vault
Bronze	Sunisa Lee	(France) 2024 Paris	Women's uneven bars
Silver	Simone Biles	(France) 2024 Paris	Women's floor exercise

== See also ==
- List of Olympic male artistic gymnasts for the United States
