= Gymnastics at the 1984 Summer Olympics – Women's vault =

Women's vault at the Games of the XXIII Olympiad
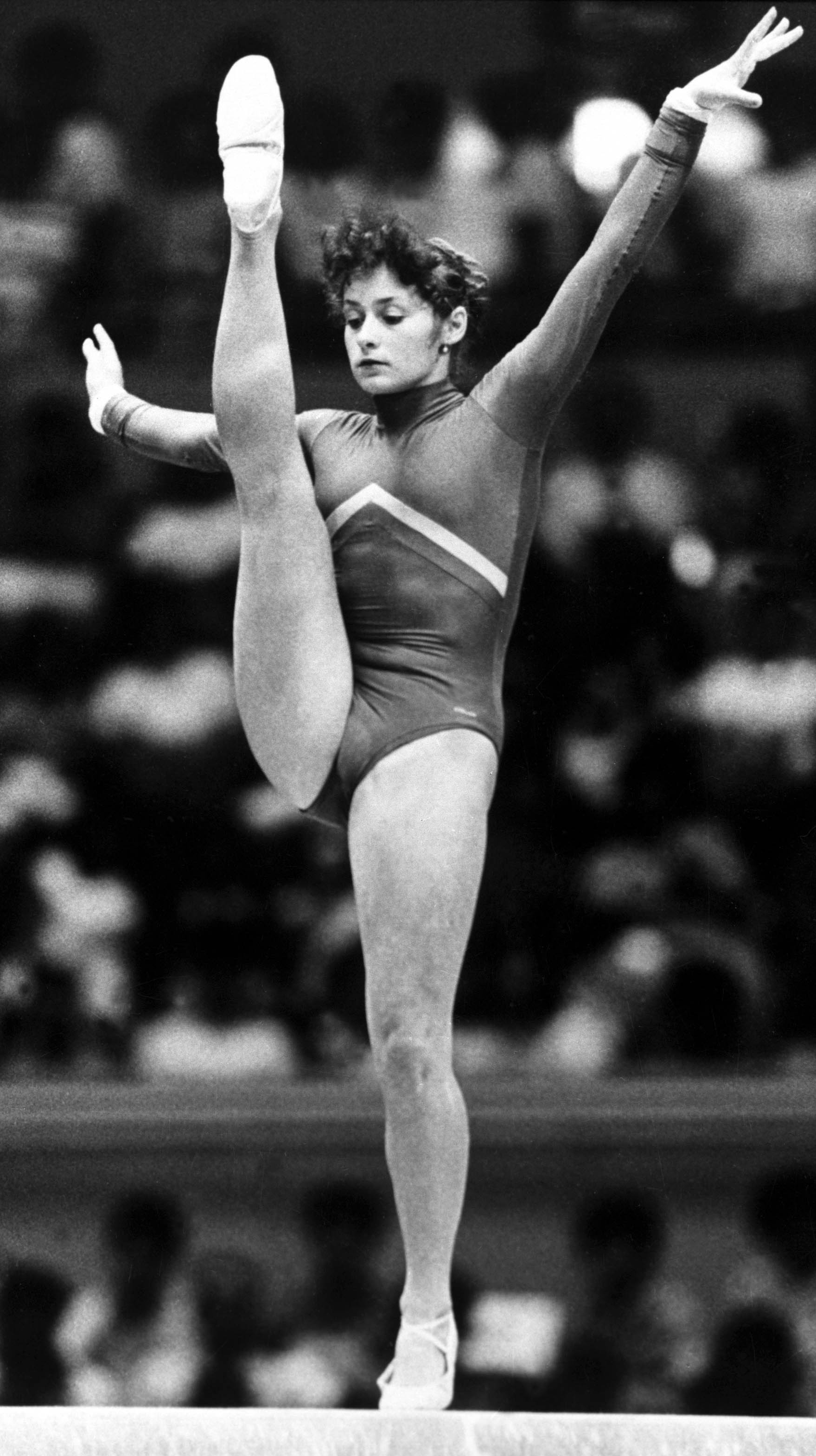
- Gold medalist Ecaterina Szabo (1985)
- Venue: UCLA's Pauley Pavilion
- Dates: July 30, 1984 (qualifying); August 5, 1984 (final)
- Competitors: 8 from 5 nations
- Winning score: 19.875 points

Medalists
1st place, gold medalist(s)		Ecaterina Szabo	Romania
2nd place, silver medalist(s)		Mary Lou Retton	United States
3rd place, bronze medalist(s)		Lavinia Agache	Romania

These are the results of the women's vault competition, one of six events for female competitors in artistic gymnastics at the 1984 Summer Olympics in Los Angeles. The qualification and final rounds took place on July 30, August 1 and 5 at UCLA’s Pauley Pavilion.

== Results ==
Sixty-five gymnasts competed in the compulsory and optional rounds on July 30 and August 1. The eight highest scoring gymnasts advanced to the final on August 5. Half of the points earned by each gymnast during both the compulsory and optional rounds carried over to the final. This constitutes the "prelim" score.

Rank	Gymnast	C	O	Prelim	Final	Total
Gold medal	Ecaterina Szabo (ROU)	9.900	10.000	9.950	9.925	19.875
Silver medal	Mary Lou Retton (USA)	9.900	10.000	9.950	9.900	19.850
Bronze medal	Lavinia Agache (ROU)	9.900	9.900	9.900	9.850	19.750
4	Tracee Talavera (USA)	9.800	9.900	9.850	9.850	19.700
5	Zhou Ping (CHN)	9.900	9.750	9.825	9.675	19.500
6	Brigitta Lehmann (FRG)	9.700	9.800	9.750	9.675	19.425
6	Kelly Brown (CAN)	9.800	9.600	9.700	9.725	19.425
8	Chen Yongyan (CHN)	9.900	9.750	9.825	9.475	19.300
