= Limor Friedman =

Israeli artistic gymnast

- לימור פרידמן
- Born: January 30, 1968 (age 58)
- Height: 162 cm (5.31 ft)

Gymnastics career
- Discipline: Women's artistic gymnastics
- Country represented: Israel
- Head coach: Zahava Zissman

Limor Friedman (also Fridman; Hebrew: לימור פרידמן; born January 30, 1968) is an Israeli former Olympic gymnast. She was born in Israel and is Jewish.

== Gymnastics career ==
She was coached by Zahava Zissman. Friedman came in sixth in the South African Cup in November 1982.

Friedman competed in gymnastics for Israel at the 1984 Summer Olympics in Los Angeles, California, at the age of 16. In the women's individual all-around she came in 65th, in the women's floor exercise she came in 64th, in the women's horse vault she came in 59th, in the women's uneven bars she came in 64th, and in the women's balance beam she came in 65th. At the time that she competed in the Olympics, she was 5 ft 3.5 in (161.3 cm) tall and weighed 101 pounds (46 kg).
