= Andrea Thomas =

Andrea Thomas may refer to:

- Andrea Thomas (character), fictional character in the TV series The Secrets of Isis
- Andrea Thomas (German athlete) (born 1963), German sprinter (200m)
- Andrea Thomas (Jamaican athlete) (born 1968), Jamaican runner (400m and 800m)
- Andrea Thomas (gymnast) (born 1968), Canadian Olympic gymnast
