= Heike Schwarm =

German gymnast

Personal information
- Nationality: German
- Born: 17 October 1967 (age 57); Idar-Oberstein, Germany

Sport
- Sport: Gymnastics

Heike Schwarm (born 17 October 1967) is a German gymnast. She competed in six events at the 1984 Summer Olympics.
