= 1985 European Artistic Gymnastics Championships =

1985 European Artistic Gymnastics Championships refers to either of the following competitions:

- 1985 European Men's Artistic Gymnastics Championships
- 1985 European Women's Artistic Gymnastics Championships
