= Bettina Ernst =

Swiss gymnast (born 1968)

Personal information
- Nationality: Swiss
- Born: 14 December 1968 (age 57)

Sport
- Sport: Gymnastics

Bettina Ernst (born 14 December 1968) is a Swiss gymnast. She competed in six events at the 1984 Summer Olympics.
