= Angela Golz =

German gymnast

Personal information
- Nationality: German
- Born: 27 July 1969 (age 55); Birkenfeld, Germany

Sport
- Sport: Gymnastics

Angela Golz (born 27 July 1969) is a German gymnast. She competed in six events at the 1984 Summer Olympics.
