= Sae Watanabe =

Japanese gymnast

Personal information
- Nationality: Japanese
- Born: 27 December 1968 (age 56)

Sport
- Sport: Gymnastics

Sae Watanabe (渡辺 三重, Watanabe Sae, born 27 December 1968) is a Japanese gymnast. She competed in six events at the 1984 Summer Olympics.
