= Ayami Yukimori =

Japanese gymnast

Personal information
- Nationality: Japanese
- Born: 25 December 1969 (age 55)

Sport
- Sport: Gymnastics

Ayami Yukimori (行森 文美, Yukimori Ayami, born 25 December 1969) is a Japanese gymnast. She competed in six events at the 1984 Summer Olympics.
