= Tokie Kawase =

Japanese gymnast

Personal information
- Nationality: Japanese
- Born: 25 September 1968 (age 56)

Sport
- Sport: Gymnastics

Tokie Kawase (川瀬 時枝, Kawase Tokie, born 25 September 1968) is a Japanese gymnast. She competed in six events at the 1984 Summer Olympics.
