= Marisa Jervella =

Swiss gymnast

Personal information
- Nationality: Swiss
- Born: 24 September 1968 (age 56)

Sport
- Sport: Gymnastics

Marisa Jervella (born 24 September 1968) is a Swiss gymnast. She competed in six events at the 1984 Summer Olympics.
