= Jessica Tudos =

Canadian gymnast

Jessica Tudos OLY
Personal information
- Born: 4 April 1969 (age 57) Toronto, Ontario, Canada

Sport
- Sport: Gymnastics

Jessica Tudos (born 4 April 1969) is a Canadian gymnast. She competed in six events at the 1984 Summer Olympics.
