= Monika Beer =

Swiss gymnast

Personal information
- Nationality: Swiss
- Born: 27 November 1968 (age 56)

Sport
- Sport: Gymnastics

Monika Beer (born 27 November 1968) is a Swiss gymnast. She competed in six events at the 1984 Summer Olympics.
