= Marta Artigas =

Spanish gymnast

Personal information
- Nationality: Spanish
- Born: 11 June 1968 (age 57); Barcelona, Spain

Sport
- Sport: Gymnastics

Marta Artigas Masmen (born 11 June 1968) is a Spanish gymnast. She competed in six events at the 1984 Summer Olympics.
