= Michelle Dusserre =

American artistic gymnast

Personal information
- Full name: Michelle Hollis Dusserre
- Born: December 26, 1968 (age 57) Long Beach, California, U.S.
Medal record
Women's artistic gymnastics
Representing United States
Olympic Games
Silver medal – second place	1984 Los Angeles	Team

Michelle Hollis Dusserre (born December 26, 1968) is a former gymnast. She competed for the United States national team at the 1984 Summer Olympics and won a silver medal in the team competition. She was born in Long Beach, California.
