= Chihiro Oyagi =

Japanese gymnast

Personal information
- Nationality: Japanese
- Born: 26 July 1963 (age 61)

Sport
- Sport: Gymnastics

Chihiro Oyagi (大八木 千尋, Ōyagi Chihiro, born 26 July 1963) is a Japanese gymnast. She competed in six events at the 1984 Summer Olympics.
