= Ecaterina Szabo =

Hungarian artistic gymnast

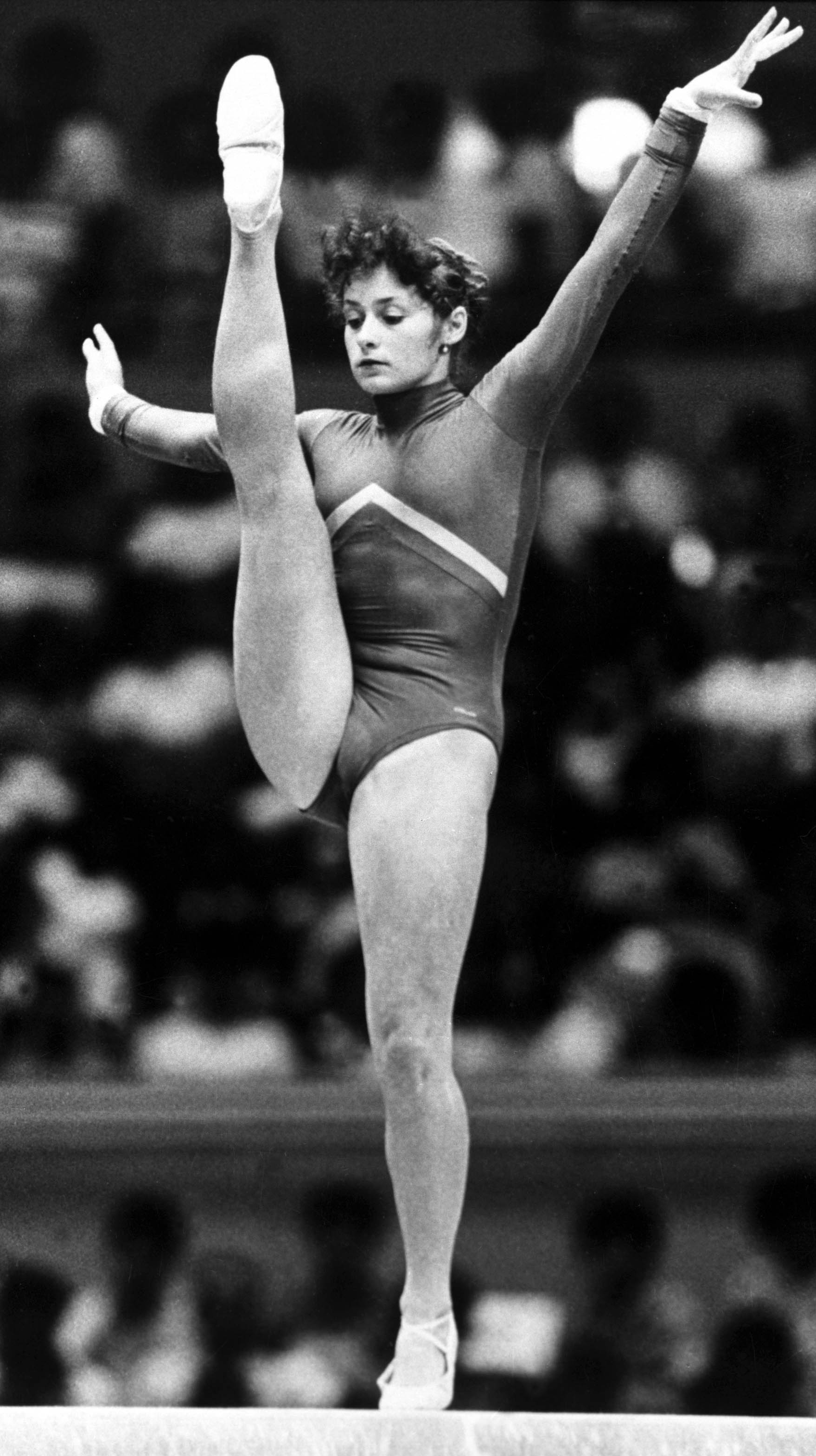
- Szabo in 1985

Personal information
- Born: 22 January 1968 (age 58) Zagon, Covasna, Romania

Gymnastics career
- Discipline: Women's artistic gymnastics
- Country represented: Romania (1983–1987)
- Club: Liceul Sportiv Deva
- Head coach: Adrian Goreac
- Assistant coaches: Adrian Stan, Maria Cosma
- Former coaches: Márta Károlyi, Béla Károlyi, Mihai Agoston
- Retired: 1987
Medal record
Representing Romania
Olympic Games
Gold medal – first place	1984 Los Angeles	Team
Gold medal – first place	1984 Los Angeles	Vault
Gold medal – first place	1984 Los Angeles	Balance beam
Gold medal – first place	1984 Los Angeles	Floor
Silver medal – second place	1984 Los Angeles	All-around
World Championships
Gold medal – first place	1983 Budapest	Floor
Gold medal – first place	1987 Rotterdam	Team
Silver medal – second place	1983 Budapest	Team
Silver medal – second place	1983 Budapest	Vault
Silver medal – second place	1983 Budapest	Uneven bars
Silver medal – second place	1985 Montreal	Team
Silver medal – second place	1985 Montreal	Vault
Silver medal – second place	1985 Montreal	Balance beam
Bronze medal – third place	1983 Budapest	All-around
Bronze medal – third place	1987 Rotterdam	Balance beam
World Cup Final
Bronze medal – third place	1986 Beijing	Vault
European Championships
Gold medal – first place	1983 Gothenburg	Uneven bars
Gold medal – first place	1983 Gothenburg	Floor exercise
Silver medal – second place	1983 Gothenburg	Vault
Silver medal – second place	1985 Helsinki	Vault
Bronze medal – third place	1983 Gothenburg	All-around

Ecaterina Szabo (Hungarian: Szabó Katalin, Hungarian pronunciation: [ˈsɒboː ˈkɒtɒlin]; born 22 January 1968) is a former Romanian artistic gymnast who won 20 Olympic, world and continental medals.

Szabo won gold medals in the 1984 Olympics in three individual events (vault, balance beam (tie), and floor exercise), won the all-around silver medal, and contributed to the team gold. With her four gold medals and a silver medal, Szabo was the most successful athlete at the 1984 Summer Olympics. Afterwards, she led her team to the world title at the 1987 World Artistic Gymnastics Championships, defeating the USSR in the team competition for only the second time in the history of the competition. In 2000, Szabo was inducted into the International Gymnastics Hall of Fame.

== Early life and career ==
An ethnic Hungarian from Transylvania, she was named Katalin, which was later changed to Ecaterina by the Communists to try to hide her Hungarian background. Szabo's first language is Hungarian. She started gymnastics in 1973 at the Gymnastics School in Oneşti with coaches Maria Cosma and Mihai Agoston. Later she trained with Márta and Béla Károlyi. After the Károlyis' defection to the United States in 1981, she was coached by Adrian Goreac, Adrian Stan and Maria Cosma at Cetate Deva. She enjoyed tremendous success as a junior. Szabo became the first gymnast to win two Junior European all-around titles, competing against Lavinia Agache and Natalia Ilienko (in 1980) and Olga Mostepanova and Yelena Shushunova (in 1982). Individually, in 1980 she won gold on vault, beam and floor and placed fourth on uneven bars and in 1982 she won gold on vault and floor, silver on uneven bars and placed fourth on balance beam.

== Senior career ==
=== 1983 ===
Szabo's first major international event was the 1983 European Championships in Goteborg. There she won gold on floor and uneven bars, silver on vault and bronze (tie) all around. At the 1983 World Championships she placed third all around after Olga Mostepanova and Natalia Yurchenko. In this event she scored two perfect tens, one on floor and one on vault. In addition to her all around bronze she won gold on floor and silver on vault and uneven bars. She did not qualify for the beam finals. She also contributed heavily to the team silver medal by scoring perfect tens on floor and uneven bars in the team optional.

=== 1984 Olympics ===
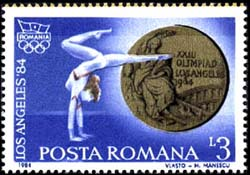
Ecaterina Szabo on a 1984 Romanian stamp

In response to the American-led boycott of the 1980 Summer Olympics in Moscow, 14 Eastern Bloc countries and allies including the Soviet Union, Cuba and East Germany (but not Romania) boycotted the Games. In the absence of the Soviet competitors, Szabo entered the competition as the favourite. Even with the Soviets competing, Szabo would have been a strong contender. While preparing for the Olympics, Szabo scored a perfect 40.0 for her compulsory exercises at a dual meet held in Czechoslovakia. During the team section of the Olympic Games Szabo performed strongly, leading her team to their first Olympic title and qualifying second into the all-around (mainly due to a fall on bars in the team finals) and into three of the four event finals (vault, beam, and floor). Szabo was a heavy favorite to win to the all-around title and was dubbed "the next Nadia", after Nadia Comăneci. In the all-around competition, however, she lost the title by .05 to Mary Lou Retton and received the silver medal. Despite the second-place finish, she posted the highest cumulative score, which would have given her the title if the competition were held under the New Life rule. However, she had a strong comeback in the event finals, winning three gold medals on the three event finals she had qualified for; vault, beam and floor. Despite personal disappointment for not winning the all-around title, Szabo returned home to Romania a heroine. Later that year, she was elected the most successful athlete of the year in Romania.

=== After the 1984 Olympics ===
1985 was a disappointing year for the multiple Olympic champion. At the 1985 European Championships Szabo placed sixth on beam and floor, fifth all around and did not qualify in the uneven bars finals. However, she managed to win a silver medal on vault. Later that year she had a similar showing at the 1985 World Championships; she placed fifth all around, fourth on floor, sixth on uneven bars. She left the competition with silver medals on beam, vault and with the team. But in 1987, Szabo's hard work paid off. As a member of the tremendously successful Romanian team (five gold, one silver and four bronze) at the 1987 World Championships, Szabo and her teammates dealt a crushing defeat to the Soviets, winning the gold medal in the team event. Individually, she tied for bronze on beam with Svetlana Boginskaya and placed 14th all around.

== Post-retirement ==
After the 1987 Worlds Szabo retired from artistic gymnastics and she went to study at the University of Physical and Sports Education in Bucharest. After graduation, she worked as a coach at Deva where she trained among others Nadia Haţegan, Andreea Cacovean, and the 1999 World Champion Maria Olaru. In June 1991, Szabo married Christian Tamas, a former member of Romania's kayak team. The two later had two sons named Lorenzo and Zeno. In 1992, the family left Romania and settled in Chamalieres, France where she now works as a coach.

In 2005, she was featured in a two-part documentary series titled Székely sportolók Kelettől Nyugatig (Székely Athletes from East to West). The 30-minute portrait film about Szabo was captioned A zágoni üstökös (The Comet of Zagon). A kindergarten in her hometown of Zagon, the Szabó Kati Óvoda, bears her name since 2007. In 2008, the sports hall of Sfântu Gheorghe was renamed in the honor of the four-time Olympic champion.

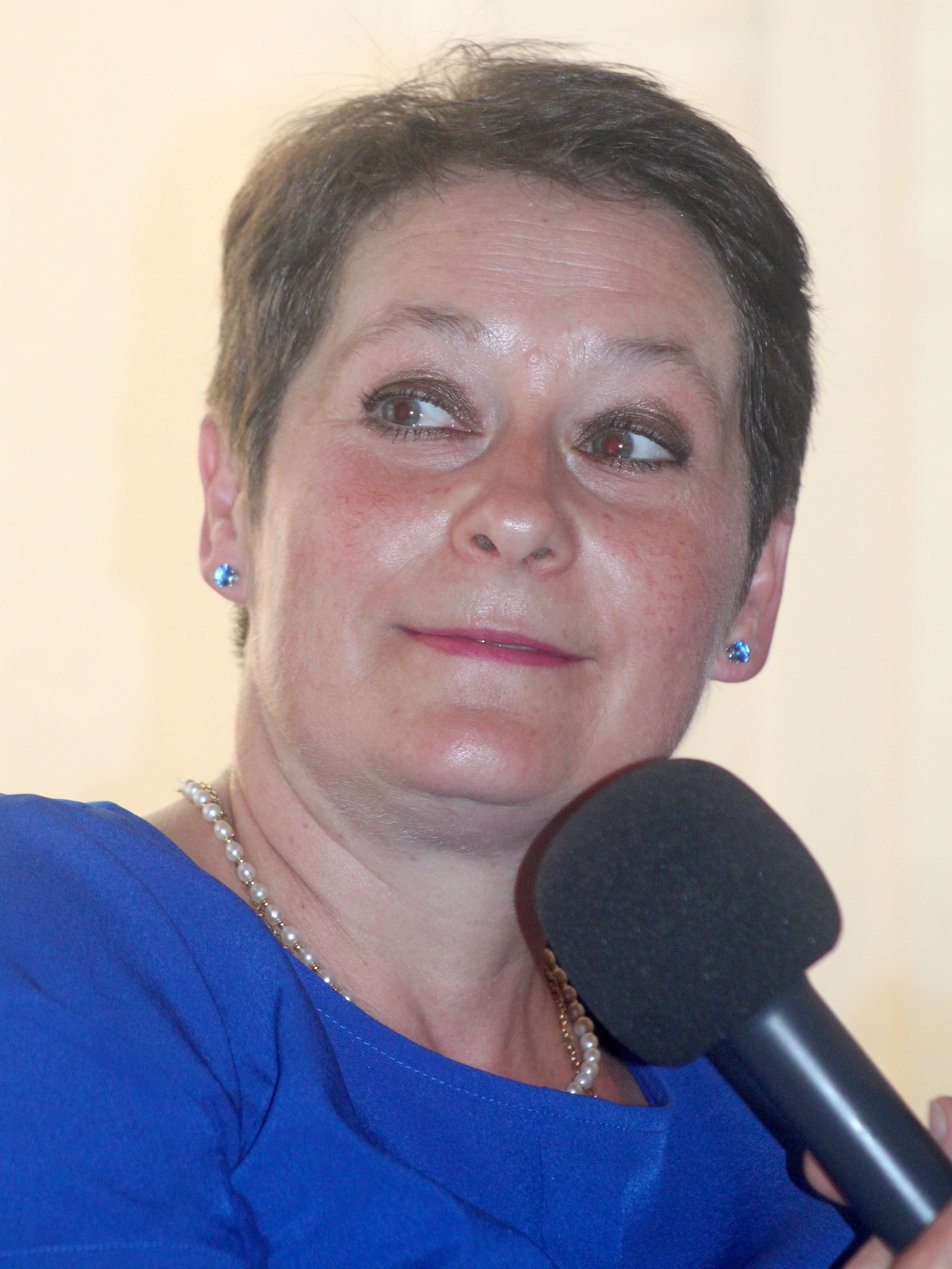
Szabo in 2017

Szabo has been open about the systematic age falsification perpetrated by the Romanian Gymnastics Federation, to allow gymnasts to compete despite not meeting the minimum age requirement of 15 years. Although she revealed that her documents were falsified to indicate a 1967 birth year instead of 1968, it is unclear why this was done, as she was already age-eligible for her first major international senior competitions.

Currently, she is a part-time university student.

== Skills ==
A strong all-arounder with artistic sensibilities, Szabo had a clean form in execution and was rewarded 17 scores of perfect ten between 1983 and 1984. Her skills included a tucked backward salto with a full twist on beam (e.g. 1982 Ennia Cup). On floor she performed difficult passes such as 1½ twist back salto to 1½ twist back salto, punch front or 1½ twist back salto to 1½ twist back salto, salto forward 1/2, punch front. She also mounted floor exercise with a double back flip with a full twist in a piked position. At the 1983 Worlds and 1984 Olympic Games Event Finals she also dismounted with a double back flip with a full twist in a tuck position which was unheard of. Most gymnasts at the time did not even mount with this move. This cemented the Olympic title in the Floor Exercise for her in which she received a perfect 10.0 for the exercise beating both Julianne McNamara and Mary Lou Retton for the gold medal.

== Competitive history ==
Year	Event	Team	AA	VT	UB	BB	FX
Junior
1978	Romanian Championships		6				
1980	Chunichi Cup		17			1st place, gold medalist(s)	
1980	Junior European Championships		1st place, gold medalist(s)	1st place, gold medalist(s)	4	1st place, gold medalist(s)	1st place, gold medalist(s)
1980	ROM-GBR Dual Meet	1st place, gold medalist(s)	2nd place, silver medalist(s)				
1980	ROM-SUI Dual Meet	1st place, gold medalist(s)	6				
1980	Swiss Cup				2nd place, silver medalist(s)		
1981	Daciada		3rd place, bronze medalist(s)				
1981	International Championships of Romania			3rd place, bronze medalist(s)			
1981	International Junior Championships (Tokyo)		3rd place, bronze medalist(s)	2nd place, silver medalist(s)	2nd place, silver medalist(s)		1st place, gold medalist(s)
1981	International Junior Championships (Sapporo)			1st place, gold medalist(s)			
1982	Balkan Championships	1st place, gold medalist(s)	2nd place, silver medalist(s)			2nd place, silver medalist(s)	
1982	Ennia Gold Cup		1st place, gold medalist(s)	4	2nd place, silver medalist(s)		1st place, gold medalist(s)
1982	International Championships of Romania		1st place, gold medalist(s)		1st place, gold medalist(s)	2nd place, silver medalist(s)	1st place, gold medalist(s)
1982	Junior European Championships		1st place, gold medalist(s)	1st place, gold medalist(s)	2nd place, silver medalist(s)	4	1st place, gold medalist(s)
Senior
1983	Catania Cup		2nd place, silver medalist(s)				
1983	City of Popes Jr. International		1st place, gold medalist(s)				
1983	European Championships		3rd place, bronze medalist(s)	2nd place, silver medalist(s)	1st place, gold medalist(s)		1st place, gold medalist(s)
1983	ESP-ROM Dual Meet	1st place, gold medalist(s)	2nd place, silver medalist(s)				
1983	FRG-ROM Dual Meet	1st place, gold medalist(s)	1st place, gold medalist(s)				
1983	GBR-ROM Dual Meet	1st place, gold medalist(s)	2nd place, silver medalist(s)				
1983	Gymnastics Hit Parade of Rome					1st place, gold medalist(s)	1st place, gold medalist(s)
1983	HOL-ROM Dual Meet	1st place, gold medalist(s)	1st place, gold medalist(s)				
1983	International Championships of Romania		1st place, gold medalist(s)	2nd place, silver medalist(s)	1st place, gold medalist(s)	1st place, gold medalist(s)	1st place, gold medalist(s)
1983	Romanian Championships		2nd place, silver medalist(s)				
1983	World Championships	2nd place, silver medalist(s)	3rd place, bronze medalist(s)	2nd place, silver medalist(s)	2nd place, silver medalist(s)		1st place, gold medalist(s)
1984	Balkan Championships	1st place, gold medalist(s)	1st place, gold medalist(s)	1st place, gold medalist(s)	1st place, gold medalist(s)		
1984	Chunichi Cup		1st place, gold medalist(s)			3rd place, bronze medalist(s)	3rd place, bronze medalist(s)
1984	ESP-ROM Dual Meet	1st place, gold medalist(s)	1st place, gold medalist(s)				
1984	Golden Sands International		1st place, gold medalist(s)				1st place, gold medalist(s)
1984	International Championships of Romania		2nd place, silver medalist(s)	1st place, gold medalist(s)		1st place, gold medalist(s)	1st place, gold medalist(s)
1984	Romanian Championships		1st place, gold medalist(s)				
1984	ROM-TCH Dual Meet	1st place, gold medalist(s)	1st place, gold medalist(s)				
1984	Tokyo Cup					1st place, gold medalist(s)	2nd place, silver medalist(s)
1984	Olympic Games	1st place, gold medalist(s)	2nd place, silver medalist(s)	1st place, gold medalist(s)		1st place, gold medalist(s)	1st place, gold medalist(s)
1985	Balkan Championships	1st place, gold medalist(s)	1st place, gold medalist(s)	2nd place, silver medalist(s)	1st place, gold medalist(s)	1st place, gold medalist(s)	1st place, gold medalist(s)
1985	DTB Cup		2nd place, silver medalist(s)	1st place, gold medalist(s)	2nd place, silver medalist(s)	4	3rd place, bronze medalist(s)
1985	ESP-ROM Dual Meet	1st place, gold medalist(s)	1st place, gold medalist(s)				
1985	European Championships		5	2nd place, silver medalist(s)		6	6
1985	FRA-ROM-SUI Tri-Meet	1st place, gold medalist(s)	1st place, gold medalist(s)				
1985	Gander Memorial		1st place, gold medalist(s)				
1985	HOL-ROM Dual Meet	1st place, gold medalist(s)	1st place, gold medalist(s)				
1985	International Championships of Romania		1st place, gold medalist(s)				
1985	Romanian Championships		1st place, gold medalist(s)		1st place, gold medalist(s)		1st place, gold medalist(s)
1985	ROM-TCH Dual Meet	1st place, gold medalist(s)	1st place, gold medalist(s)				
1985	SUI-ROM-FRG Tri-Meet	1st place, gold medalist(s)	1st place, gold medalist(s)				
1985	Swiss Cup		2nd place, silver medalist(s)				
1985	Summer Universiade	2nd place, silver medalist(s)	2nd place, silver medalist(s)	1st place, gold medalist(s)	2nd place, silver medalist(s)	1st place, gold medalist(s)	2nd place, silver medalist(s)
1985	World Championships	2nd place, silver medalist(s)	5		6	2nd place, silver medalist(s)	4
1986	Balkan Championships	1st place, gold medalist(s)	1st place, gold medalist(s)	1st place, gold medalist(s)	2nd place, silver medalist(s)		
1986	DTB Cup		2nd place, silver medalist(s)				2nd place, silver medalist(s)
1986	ESP-ROM-BUL Tri-Meet	1st place, gold medalist(s)	3rd place, bronze medalist(s)				
1986	Gander Memorial		1st place, gold medalist(s)				
1986	Romanian Championships		1st place, gold medalist(s)	1st place, gold medalist(s)	2nd place, silver medalist(s)		1st place, gold medalist(s)
1986	ROM-TCH Dual Meet	1st place, gold medalist(s)	2nd place, silver medalist(s)				
1986	World Cup Final		4	3rd place, bronze medalist(s)	5	4	
1987	Madrid Grand Prix			1st place, gold medalist(s)	2nd place, silver medalist(s)	1st place, gold medalist(s)	1st place, gold medalist(s)
1987	SUI-ROM Dual Meet	1st place, gold medalist(s)	4				
1987	Summer Universiade	2nd place, silver medalist(s)	5	2nd place, silver medalist(s)		2nd place, silver medalist(s)	
1987	World Championships	1st place, gold medalist(s)	14			3rd place, bronze medalist(s)	

== See also ==
- List of multiple Olympic gold medalists at a single Games
- List of Olympic female gymnasts for Romania
- List of top Olympic gymnastics medalists
- List of top medalists at the World Artistic Gymnastics Championships
