= Kerry Battersby =

Australian gymnast

Personal information
- Nationality: Australian
- Born: 1 September 1968 (age 56)

Sport
- Sport: Gymnastics

Kerry Battersby (born 1 September 1968), also known as Kerri Battersby or Keri Agg, is an Australian gymnast. She competed in five events at the 1984 Summer Olympics.
