= Natalie Seiler =

Swiss gymnast

Personal information
- Nationality: Swiss
- Born: 18 December 1968 (age 56); Zürich, Switzerland

Sport
- Sport: Gymnastics

Natalie Seiler (born 18 December 1968) is a Swiss gymnast. She competed in six events at the 1984 Summer Olympics.
