= Elke Heine =

German gymnast

Personal information
- Nationality: German
- Born: 9 January 1967 (age 58); Hanover, Germany

Sport
- Sport: Gymnastics

Elke Heine (born 9 January 1967) is a German gymnast. She competed in six events at the 1984 Summer Olympics.
