= Corinne Ragazzacci =

French gymnast

Personal information
- Nationality: French
- Born: 27 January 1969 (age 56)

Sport
- Sport: Gymnastics

Corinne Ragazzacci (born 27 January 1969) is a French gymnast. She competed in five events at the 1984 Summer Olympics.
