= Anita Botnen =

Canadian gymnast

Personal information
- Nationality: Canadian
- Born: 19 July 1965 (age 59); Vancouver, British Columbia, Canada

Sport
- Sport: Gymnastics

Anita Botnen (born 19 July 1965) is a Canadian gymnast. She competed in six events at the 1984 Summer Olympics.
