= Nancy Goldsmith =

Israeli artistic gymnast

Nancy Goldsmith נאנסי גולדשמידט
- Born: August 4, 1966 (age 60)
- Height: 160 cm (5.2 ft)

Gymnastics career
- Discipline: Women's artistic gymnastics
- Country represented: Israel
- College team: Stanford Cardinal

Nancy (Nanci) Goldsmith (Hebrew: נאנסי גולדשמידט; born August 4, 1966) is an American citizen who competed for Israel as an Olympic gymnast.

== Early life and gymnastics career ==
Goldsmith is Jewish by birth. Much of her training (1978 - 1987) was at the National Academy of Artistic Gymnastics in Eugene, Oregon and was coached by Dick Mulvihill.

She attended Stanford University starting in January 1984 on a full gymnastics scholarship, and competed on the gymnastics team while a member of the Israel national team. In 1984, Goldsmith was named All-Western Collegiate Athletic Association. In 1987, she was named Stanford's Most Outstanding Gymnast.

Goldsmith competed for Israel at the 1984 Summer Olympics in Los Angeles, California, at the age of 17 in gymnastics. In the Women's Individual All-Around she came in 31st out of 65 competitors. When she competed in the Olympics she was 5 ft 2.5 in (158.8 cm) tall and weighed 99 lb (45 kg).
