= Laura Cutina =

Romanian gymnast (born 1968)

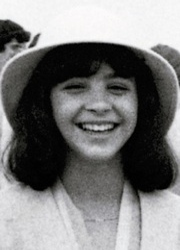

Personal information
- Born: 13 September 1968 (age 57) Bucharest, Romania
- Height: 143 cm (4 ft 8 in)

Gymnastics career
- Discipline: Women's artistic gymnastics
- Country represented: Romania
- Club: CS Dinamo București
- Head coaches: Adrian Goreac; Octavian Bellu
- Assistant coach: Maria Cosma
- Former coaches: Emilia Lita; Florin Stefanescu
Medal record
Olympic Games
Gold medal – first place	1984 Los Angeles	Team all-around
World Championships
Silver medal – second place	1983 Budapest	Team all-around
Silver medal – second place	1985 Montreal	Team all-around

Laura Cutina (born 13 September 1968) is a retired Romanian artistic gymnast. She is an Olympic gold medalist and a two-time world silver medalist with the team. After retiring from competitions she worked as gymnastics coach. In 1990 she moved to Italy and then to the United States.
