= Anja Wilhelm =

German gymnast

Personal information
- Nationality: German
- Born: 26 September 1968 (age 56); Wolfsburg, Germany

Sport
- Sport: Gymnastics

Anja Wilhelm (born 26 September 1968) is a German former gymnast. She competed in three events; team all around, individual all around, and the balance beam final at the 1984 Summer Olympics. Wilhelm also won twelve national titles during her career.
