= Kellie Wilson (gymnast) =

Australian gymnast

Personal information
- Nationality: Australian
- Born: 22 October 1966 (age 58)

Sport
- Sport: Gymnastics

Kellie Wilson (born 22 October 1966) is an Australian former gymnast. She competed in five events at the 1984 Summer Olympics.
