= Noriko Mochizuki =

Japanese gymnast (born 1967)

Personal information
- Nationality: Japanese
- Born: 16 July 1967 (age 58)

Sport
- Sport: Gymnastics
Medal record
Representing Japan
Asian Games
Bronze medal – third place	1986 Seoul	Team

Noriko Mochizuki (望月 のり子, Mochizuki Noriko; born 16 July 1967) is a Japanese gymnast. She competed in six events at the 1984 Summer Olympics.
