= Brigitta Lehmann =

German gymnast

Personal information
- Nationality: German
- Born: 24 October 1966 (age 58); Berlin, Germany

Sport
- Sport: Gymnastics

Brigitta Lehmann (born 24 October 1966) is a German gymnast. She competed in six events at the 1984 Summer Olympics.
