= Kelly Brown (gymnast) =

Canadian gymnast

Personal information
- Born: 13 November 1965 (age 59); London, Ontario, Canada

Sport
- Sport: Gymnastics

Kelly Brown (born 13 November 1965) is a Canadian gymnast. She competed in six events at the 1984 Summer Olympics.
