= Bonnie Wittmeier =

Canadian gymnast

Personal information
- Born: 15 September 1966 (age 59) Winnipeg, Manitoba, Canada

Sport
- Sport: Gymnastics

Bonnie Wittmeier (born 15 September 1966) is a Canadian gymnast. She competed in six events at the 1984 Summer Olympics.

In 1992, Wittmeier was inducted into the Manitoba Sports Hall of Fame.
