= Lee Jung-hee (gymnast) =

South Korean gymnast

Personal information
- Nationality: South Korean
- Born: 10 August 1965 (age 59)

Sport
- Sport: Gymnastics

Korean name
- Hangul: 이정희
- Hanja: 李貞熙
- RR: I Jeonghui
- MR: I Chŏnghŭi

Lee Jung-hee (born 10 August 1965) is a South Korean gymnast. She competed in six events at the 1984 Summer Olympics.
