= Ana Manso =

Spanish gymnast

Personal information
- Nationality: Spanish
- Born: 7 March 1966 (age 59); Tarragona, Spain

Sport
- Sport: Gymnastics

Ana Manso (born 7 March 1966) is a Spanish gymnast. She competed in six events at the 1984 Summer Olympics.
