= Simona Păucă =

Romanian artistic gymnast

Simona Păuca
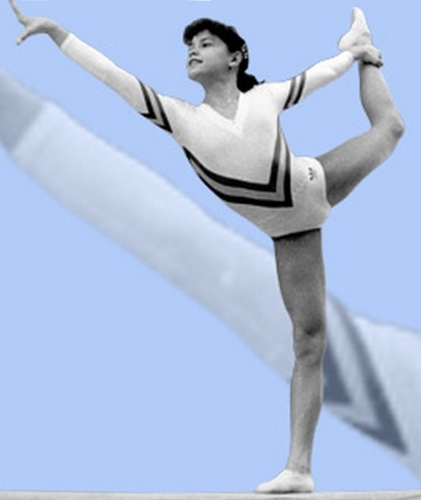
- Păucă at the 1984 Olympics

Personal information
- Born: 19 September 1969 (age 56) Azuga, Romania
- Height: 150 cm (4 ft 11 in)

Gymnastics career
- Discipline: Women's artistic gymnastics
- Country represented: Romania
- Club: CS Dinamo București
- Head coaches: Emilia Lita; Florin Stefanescu
- Former coach: Iulia Rotarascu
Medal record
Olympic Games
Gold medal – first place	1984 Los Angeles	Balance beam
Gold medal – first place	1984 Los Angeles	Team
Bronze medal – third place	1984 Los Angeles	All-around

Simona Păuca (born 19 September 1969) is a retired Romanian artistic gymnast. She competed at the 1984 Summer Olympics in Los Angeles, where she tied for gold with her teammate Ecaterina Szabo on balance beam with a difficult and innovative routine; she also won a team gold medal and a bronze medal all-around. After retiring from competitions she worked as a youth coach at her native club Dinamo București.
