= Astrid Beckers =

German gymnast

Personal information
- Nationality: German
- Born: 25 October 1965 (age 59); Viersen, Germany

Sport
- Sport: Gymnastics

Astrid Beckers (born 25 October 1965) is a German former gymnast. She competed in six events at the 1984 Summer Olympics.
