= Huang Mandan =

Chinese artistic gymnast

Huang Mandan (gymnast)
- Born: 15 March 1984 (age 42) Shanwei, Guangdong

Gymnastics career
- Discipline: Women's artistic gymnastics
- Country represented: China
- Retired: 2001
Medal record
Women's gymnastics
Representing China
2000 Summer Olympics
Disqualified	2000 Sydney	Team
World Championships
Silver medal – second place	1999 Tianjin	Uneven Bars
Disqualified	1999 Tianjin	Team
Pacific Rim Championships
Gold medal – first place	1998 Winnipeg	Uneven Bars
Bronze medal – third place	1998 Winnipeg	All-Around

Huang Mandan (simplified Chinese: 黄曼丹; traditional Chinese: 黃曼丹; pinyin: Huáng Màndān, born 15 March 1984) is a former Chinese gymnast.

== Gymnastics career ==
=== 1999 ===
Huang participated in the 1999 World Championships in Tianjin, China, where she won bronze with her team. She qualified to the individual all-around, where she placed 6th. Her low start values on vault greatly contributed to her placing out of the medals. She ended her world championships with a silver medal on uneven bars, behind Svetlana Khorkina and in front of teammate Ling Jie.

=== 2000 Olympic Games ===
In the 2000 Olympics, she placed in qualification of uneven bars, but did not advance to the final because of the two per country rule. Her teammates Ling Jie and Yang Yun qualified into the bar finals in 2nd and 4th, where they finished 2nd and 3rd respectively. She was also a member of the bronze medal winning team, but the medal was stripped by the IOC in 2010 after one of the Chinese team members, Dong Fangxiao, was found to be underage during the competition. In March 2012, the 1999 World Championship Team Bronze was forfeited by China and given to Ukraine in light of the same information.
