= Tracee Talavera =

American artistic gymnast

- Full name: Tracee Ann Talavera
- Born: September 1, 1966 (age 60) Santa Clara, California, U.S.

Gymnastics career
Medal record
Women's artistic gymnastics
Representing United States
Olympic Games
Silver medal – second place	1984 Los Angeles	Team all-around
World Championships
Bronze medal – third place	1981 Moscow	Balance beam

Tracee Ann Talavera (born September 1, 1966) is an American former artistic gymnast who competed for the United States at the Olympics and World Championships. She qualified for the 1980 Olympic team. She was the 1981 and 1982 U.S. National All-around Champion and a member of the silver medal-winning American team at the 1984 Olympics in Los Angeles. Talavera was born in Santa Clara, California.

== Gymnastics career ==
Coached by Dick and Linda Mulvihill until 1983, when she began training with Mike Lynch, Talavera rose to prominence on the U.S. gymnastics scene in the late 1970s. In 1978 she won the all-around titles in both the junior division of the U.S. National Championships and the Junior Olympic Nationals. The following year, competing as a senior, she placed second in the all-around at the U.S. Nationals and third at the World team trials. She was awarded a spot on the 1979 team for the World Championships, but at age 12½ was well below the minimum age requirement of 14 and was deemed ineligible to compete.

Talavera continued to enjoy success in 1980. Early in the year, she won the all-around title and every event except vault at the American Cup, beating a field that included Romanian Emilia Eberle, a multiple medalist at the World Championships. She also placed first at the Olympic Festival and had a strong second-place all-around showing at the 1980 U.S. Nationals. In 1980 Talavera was also the subject of a biography, The story of a young gymnast: Tracee Talavera published by Bantam Books.

She won the U.S. Olympic Trials and was named to the women's gymnastics team for the 1980 Olympics in Moscow. However, due to President Jimmy Carter's boycott of the Games in the Soviet Union to protest the invasion of Afghanistan, Talavera, along with the rest of the American team, was unable to participate in the Olympics. As consolation, she was one of 461 athletes to receive a Congressional Gold Medal many years later.

Talavera continued competing as a member of the U.S. National team after the Olympics. In 1981, she won her second U.S. National Championship and participated in the World Championships in Moscow, helping the American team to a 6th-place finish. She also became one of only a few American women to date to win an individual medal at Worlds, earning a bronze on the balance beam. Talavera's original balance beam element, a one-handed flair, was named after her in the Code of Points. It is still included in the Code, and currently carries a 'C' difficulty rating.

In 1983 Talavera's competitive fortunes changed. She was only able to achieve a 15th-place finish at U.S. Nationals and was left off the World Championships team. However, in 1984 she returned to finish 8th in the all-around at Nationals and win the beam gold medal, placed 6th at the U.S. Olympic Trials, and earned a spot on the American team at the 1984 Olympics in Los Angeles. She helped the team to a silver-medal finish and qualified for the vault event final, placing 4th.

After the Olympics, Talavera participated in an exhibition tour with her teammates.

== Post-retirement ==
Talavera retired from gymnastics after the 1984 tour and returned to school, earning a B.A. degree in communications from Saint Mary's College of California in 1990. In 1998 she was inducted into the USA Gymnastics Hall of Fame. She was working as a coach at Golden Gate Gymnastics in Concord, California (until they closed in 2009) and remains involved in USA Gymnastics. In 2000, she was a member of the selection committee for the women's gymnastics team for the Sydney Olympics.

Talavera was diagnosed with multiple sclerosis in 1988.
