= Wang Huiying =

Chinese gymnast

Personal information
- Nationality: Chinese
- Born: 23 February 1971 (age 55)

Sport
- Sport: Gymnastics
Medal record
Representing China
Asian Games
Gold medal – first place	1986 Seoul	Team

Wang Huiying (born 23 February 1971) is a Chinese gymnast. She competed in six events at the 1988 Summer Olympics.

== Eponymous skill ==
Wang has one eponymous skill listed in the Code of Points.

Apparatus	Name	Description	Difficulty (Note: Valid for the 2025-2028 Code of Points)
Vault	Wang	Handspring forward on - stretched salto forward with ½ turn (180°) off	4.6
