= Ma Ying (gymnast) =

Chinese artistic gymnast and olympian

- 马英
- Born: June 18, 1971 (age 55)

Gymnastics career
- Discipline: Women's artistic gymnastics
- Country represented: China
Medal record
Representing China
Asian Games
Gold medal – first place	1986 Seoul	Team
Gold medal – first place	1986 Seoul	Vault

Ma Ying (simplified Chinese: 马英; traditional Chinese: 馬英, born 18 June 1971) is a former Chinese gymnast who participated in the 1988 Summer Olympics. She won 2 gold medals at the 1986 Asian Games: Team and Vault.
