= Zhou Qiurui =

Chinese gymnast

Medal record

Women's Gymnastics

Representing China

Women's gymnastics

Olympic Games
Bronze medal – third place	1984 Los Angeles	Team

Zhou Qiurui (Chinese: 周秋瑞; September 29, 1967) is a former female Chinese gymnast. Zhou competed at 1984 Olympic Games and won a bronze medal in Women's Team competition. She qualified to the floor finals where she placed 4th.

At the 2020 Olympic Games, she served as floor exercise supervisor for women's events.
