= Wang Xiaoyan (gymnast) =

Chinese artistic gymnast (born 1968)

Wang Xiaoyan (Chinese: 王晓燕, born 7 January 1968) is a former Chinese gymnast who competed in the 1988 Summer Olympics. (Gymnastics W. team competing 6th place. Women's horse vault 7th place.)
