= Andrea Thomas (gymnast) =

Canadian gymnast

Personal information
- Born: 12 September 1968 (age 56); Cooksville, Ontario, Canada

Sport
- Sport: Gymnastics

Andrea Thomas (born 12 September 1968) is a Canadian gymnast. She competed in six events at the 1984 Summer Olympics.
