= Pam Bileck =

American gymnast

- Full name: Pamela Jean Bileck-Flat
- Born: December 1, 1968 (age 57) Pittsburgh, Pennsylvania
- Height: 1.53 m (5 ft 0 in)

Gymnastics career
- Discipline: Women's artistic gymnastics
- Country represented: United States (1981-85)
- Gym: Southern California Acro Teams
- Head coaches: Don Peters and Mary Wright
- Former coach: Nancy Kludt
Medal record
Representing United States
Olympic Games
Silver medal – second place	1984 Los Angeles	Team

Pamela Jean Bileck-Flat (born December 1, 1968, in Pittsburgh) is a former gymnast. She competed for the United States national team at the 1984 Summer Olympics and won a silver medal in the team competition. She was also a member of the 1983 and 1985 World Championship teams. Pam competed well at the 1985 Worlds, her final competition where she upgraded her difficulty on the floor and performed a double back for her second pass.

She was inducted into the USA Gymnastics Hall of Fame in 2006.
