= Huang Qun (gymnast) =

Chinese artistic gymnast

- 黄群

Gymnastics career
- Discipline: Women's artistic gymnastics
- Country represented: China
Medal record
Representing China
Olympic Games
Bronze medal – third place	1984 Los Angeles	Team
Asian Games
Gold medal – first place	1986 Seoul	Team
Gold medal – first place	1986 Seoul	Uneven Bars
Silver medal – second place	1986 Seoul	All-around
Silver medal – second place	1986 Seoul	Balance Beam

Huang Qun (simplified Chinese: 黄群; traditional Chinese: 黃群; pinyin: Huáng Qún) is a Chinese former artistic gymnast. Huang competed at 1984 Summer Olympics and won a bronze medal in the women's team competition. She also won four medals, two gold and two silver, at the 1986 Asian Games.

== Career ==
Huang's year of birth has been stated differently in different sources. A local article gives her age as 8 in 1976, and in a 1981 article in the People's Daily, the official newspaper of the Chinese Communist Party, she was stated to be 13 years old, both of which suggest she was born in 1968. However, her official competition age has her a year younger, being born in 1969.

She began gymnastics at age 6 and was selected for the national team in 1979.

Huang competed at the 1984 Summer Olympics, where she won a bronze medal with the Chinese team and placed 21st in the all-around. The next year, she placed 15th at the 1985 World Championships and qualified for the vault final, where she finished in 4th.

In 1986, she competed at the 1986 Asian Games. There, she won silver in the all-around. She also won gold with the Chinese team, and in the apparatus finals, she won another gold on uneven bars and silver on the balance beam.
