= Li Yifang =

Chinese gymnast

Personal information
- Nationality: Chinese
- Born: 1 February 1975 (age 51)

Sport
- Sport: Gymnastics
Medal record
Representing China
Asian Games
Gold medal – first place	1990 Beijing	Team
Silver medal – second place	1990 Beijing	All-Around
Silver medal – second place	1990 Beijing	Balance Beam

Li Yifang (born 1 February 1975) is a Chinese gymnast. She competed in six events at the 1992 Summer Olympics.

== Eponymous skill ==
Li has one eponymous skill listed in the Code of Points.

Apparatus	Name	Description	Difficulty (Note: Valid for the 2025–2028 Code of Points)
Balance beam	Li Yifang	Jump press or swing to cross or side handstand – 1/1 turn (360°) in handstand - release one hand with swing down	C (0.3)
