= He Xuemei =

Chinese gymnast (born 1977)

Personal information
- Nationality: Chinese
- Born: 6 February 1977 (age 49) Yulong Naxi Autonomous County, Lijiang, Yunnan, China

Sport
- Sport: Gymnastics
Medal record
Representing China
Asian Games
Gold medal – first place	1994 Hiroshima	Team

He Xuemei (Chinese: 和雪梅; pinyin: Hé Xuěméi, born 6 February 1977) is a Chinese gymnast. She competed in six events at the 1992 Summer Olympics. She was the last female Olympic athlete to perform the Thomas salto in her routine.

In 2006, she married Takaseki Takashi, a logistics manager from Japan, and changed her name to Takaseki Setsubai (高堰雪梅).

She represented Japan at the 2006 Asian Artistic Gymnastics Championships.
