= Kathy Johnson =

American Olympic gymnast

- Full name: Katherine Johnson Clarke
- Alternative name: Katherine Ann "Kathy" Johnson (-Clarke)
- Born: September 13, 1959 (age 66) Oak Ridge, Tennessee, U.S.
- Spouse: Brian Patrick Clarke

Gymnastics career
Medal record
Women's artistic gymnastics
Representing United States
Olympic Games
Silver medal – second place	1984 Los Angeles	Team all-around
Bronze medal – third place	1984 Los Angeles	Balance beam
World Championships
Bronze medal – third place	1978 Strasbourg	Floor exercise

Katherine "Kathy" Johnson Clarke (born Katherine Ann Johnson; September 13, 1959) is an American sports commentator and former artistic gymnast. Johnson was one of the first American gymnasts to win a major international medal, known for her longevity and tenacity in the sport.

== Early life ==
On September 13, 1959, Johnson was born in Oak Ridge, Tennessee.

== Career ==
At a young age, she lived in Indialantic, Florida. She began gymnastics at the age of twelve; a relatively late start for an elite gymnast. Within four years, however, she had progressed to competition at the elite level, placing 42nd at the 1975 AAU National Championships. In 1976, she finished in 23rd place at the US National Championships and twelfth at the Olympic Trials.

In 1977, however, Johnson began to achieve great success in the sport. She won the 1977 American Cup, took a silver medal in the all-around at the NHK Cup in Japan, and won the floor exercise gold and the all-around silver at the 1977 US Nationals. She continued to improve in 1978, becoming the US National all-around champion and winning the silver medal at the American Cup.

At the 1978 World Artistic Gymnastics Championships in Strasbourg, Johnson placed eighth in the all-around—an excellent finish for an American gymnast at the time—and won a bronze medal on the floor exercise, tying with Romania's Emilia Eberle.

In 1979, the Supersisters trading card set was produced and distributed; one of the cards featured Johnson's name and picture.

After her win, Johnson remained a vital member of the US team, helping the squad achieve a sixth-place finish at the 1979 Worlds. However, problems with her verbally abusive coach, who pressured her to lose weight and train even when she was seriously injured, took their toll, both physically and emotionally. Struggling to complete her University studies and stay competitive in a sport that was increasingly embracing younger, lighter girls, she developed bulimia.

Johnson was further disheartened when the United States decided to join the boycott of the 1980 Moscow Olympics. She had placed second at the Olympic Trials, had been named the team captain of the American squad and had been considered a legitimate contender for success at the Games. After relocating to Southern California to train at SCATS with Don Peters, Johnson's fortunes and spirit improved. By 1983 she was representing the US at the World Championships again; placing eleventh in the all-around and qualifying to the floor exercise event final.

In 1984, at the age of twenty-four, Johnson earned a spot on the US team for the 1984 Olympics in Los Angeles. She was elected the team captain.

In addition to winning a silver medal with the squad, she won an individual bronze on the balance beam. In doing so, she became the second American female gymnast to medal in both a Worlds and an Olympics. Her teammate, Julianne Mcnamara, became the first American gymnast to hold that distinction, having won a bronze medal on the uneven bars at the 1981 World Championships and winning the gold medal (tied with Ma Yanhong of China) on the uneven bars one day before Johnson won her medal on beam.

After Johnson retired from gymnastics, her career focus turned to television; less than a year after her Olympic win she appeared as a guest star on the children's show Kids Incorporated.

Johnson was a sports commentator for ABC-TV Sports and ESPN, covering multiple gymnastics events. In 2015, Johnson joined SEC Network in 2015 as a gymnastic analyst. In film, Johnson also served as the technical advisor for Lifetime Television's film Little Girls in Pretty Boxes.

Johnson has been involved in several initiatives to improve conditions for gymnasts and other world-class athletes, and has spoken publicly and lectured about her struggle with bulimia and her experiences in gymnastics.

Johnson is a member of the Advisory Committee for Justice for Athletes, an organization supporting the emotional health of young people in sports, and is an Olympic Athlete Ambassador for the Foundation for Global Sports Development's Culture, Education, Sports and Ethics Program. She is also on the National Athletic Advisory Board for Athletes for a Better World.

== Filmography ==
- 1997 Little Girls in Pretty Boxes - as Technical advisor.

== Personal life ==
Johnson's husband is Brian Patrick Clarke, an actor. They have one son, Sean (born March 1998). Johnson also has a stepson, Cary (born August 1980), from Brian's previous marriage.

Johnson is a vegetarian and used to suffer from bulimia.

== Eponymous skill ==
Johnson has one eponymous skill listed in the Code of Points.

Apparatus	Name	Description	Difficulty (Note: Valid for the 2025–2028 Code of Points)
Balance beam	Johnson	Leap forward with leg change and 1/4 turn (90°) to side split leap (180°) or straddle pike position	C (0.3)
