= Zhou Ping (gymnast) =

Chinese gymnast

Ping Zhou
Personal information
- Native name: 周萍
- Nationality: Chinese
- Born: 18 February 1968 (age 58) Dalian, Liaoning

Zhou Ping
Medal record

Women's Gymnastics

Representing China

Women's gymnastics

Olympic Games
Bronze medal – third place	1984 Los Angeles	Team

Zhou Ping (Chinese: 周萍; pinyin: Zhōu Píng; 18 February 1968) is a former female Chinese gymnast.

Zhou was born in Dalian. She was admitted to the Chinese national gymnastic team in 1982. Ping Zhou competed at 1984 Olympic Games, and won a bronze medal in Women's Team competition. She retired in 1985, and later studied at Shenyang Sports College. Ping Zhou is currently a coach in Dalian Amateur Sports School.
