= Chen Yongyan =

Chinese artistic gymnast (born 1962)

- Born: 19 October 1962 (age 63)

Gymnastics career
- Discipline: Women's artistic gymnastics
- Country represented: China
- Retired: 1984
Medal record
Women's artistic gymnastics
Representing China
Olympic Games
Bronze medal – third place	1984 Los Angeles	Team
World Championships
Silver medal – second place	1981 Moscow	Team
Silver medal – second place	1981 Moscow	Balance Beam
Asian Games
Gold medal – first place	1982 Delhi	Team
Gold medal – first place	1982 Delhi	All-around
Silver medal – second place	1982 Delhi	Vault

Chen Yongyan (Chinese: 陈永妍; born 19 October 1962) is a former Chinese gymnast.

Chen was born in Wuzhou, Guangxi Province. She competed at the 1984 Olympic Games and won a bronze medal in the Women's Team competition.

Chen is married to Li Ning, a prominent Chinese gymnast.

== Competitive history ==
Year	Event	Team	AA	VT	UB	BB	FX
1978	CHN-SUI-FRG Tri-Meet		2nd place, silver medalist(s)				
1980	USGF International Invitational		3rd place, bronze medalist(s)	5	2nd place, silver medalist(s)		
1980	USA-CHN Dual Meet		1st place, gold medalist(s)				
1981	Summer Universiade		7				
1981	World Championships	2nd place, silver medalist(s)	11		6	2nd place, silver medalist(s)	4
1982	Chunichi Cup		16				
1982	Asian Games	1st place, gold medalist(s)	1st place, gold medalist(s)	2nd place, silver medalist(s)			
1982	USGF International Invitational		11				
1983	Blume Memorial		1st place, gold medalist(s)				
1983	Chinese Championships		2nd place, silver medalist(s)				
1983	Budapest Championships	5	10				6
1984	Gander Memorial		5				
1984	Hong Kong International		2nd place, silver medalist(s)			2nd place, silver medalist(s)	
1984	Swiss Cup		3rd place, bronze medalist(s)				
1984	USA-CHN Dual Meet		4				4
1984	Olympic Games	3rd place, bronze medalist(s)	8	8		7	
