= Gymnastics at the 1984 Summer Olympics =

Gymnastics at the Games of the XXIII Olympiad
- Venue: Pauley Pavilion
- Dates: 29 July – 11 August 1984

At the 1984 Summer Olympics, two different gymnastics disciplines were contested. In addition to the fourteen artistic gymnastics events contested, for the first time at the Olympics, a rhythmic gymnastics event was contested–the women's individual all-around. All of the gymnastics events were held at UCLA's Pauley Pavilion in Los Angeles from July 29 through August 11. Several countries who had qualified to compete were absent as a result of the 1984 Summer Olympics boycott, including the Soviet Union, Bulgaria, Cuba, Czechoslovakia, East Germany, Hungary, and North Korea.

This was the first time in Olympic competition that eight gymnasts were allowed to move onto an apparatus final, instead of the previous six.

The USSR and other satellite countries organized an 'Alternate Olympics' where the USSR, East Germany, Bulgaria, Czechoslovakia and other Soviet Bloc (Cuba, North Korea, Poland and Hungary) nations competed.

== Artistic gymnastics ==
=== Format of competition ===
The artistic gymnastics competition at the 1984 Summer Olympics was carried out in three stages:

- Competition I - The team competition/qualification round in which all gymnasts, including those who were not part of a team, performed both compulsory and optional exercises. The combined scores of all team members determined the final score of the team. The thirty-six highest scoring gymnasts in the all-around qualified to the individual all-around competition. The eight highest scoring gymnasts on each apparatus qualified to the final for that apparatus.
- Competition II - The individual all-around competition, in which those who qualified from Competition I performed exercises on each apparatus. The final score of each gymnast was composed of half the points earned by that gymnast during Competition I and all of the points earned by him or her in Competition II.
- Competition III - The apparatus finals, in which those who qualified during Competition I performed an exercise on the individual apparatus on which he or she had qualified. The final score of each gymnast was composed of half the points earned by that gymnast on that particular apparatus during Competition I and all of the points earned by him or her on that particular apparatus in Competition III.

Each country was limited to three gymnasts in the all-around final and two gymnasts in each apparatus final.

=== Men's events ===
Games	Gold	Silver	Bronze
Team all-around	United States; Bart Conner; Timothy Daggett; Mitchell Gaylord; James Hartung; Scott Johnson; Peter Vidmar	China; Li Ning; Li Xiaoping; Li Yuejiu; Lou Yun; Tong Fei; Xu Zhiqiang	Japan; Koji Gushiken; Noritoshi Hirata; Nobuyuki Kajitani; Shinji Morisue; Koji Sotomura; Kyoji Yamawaki
Individual all-around	Koji Gushiken; Japan	Peter Vidmar; United States	Li Ning; China
Floor exercise	Li Ning; China	Lou Yun; China	Koji Sotomura; Japan
Floor exercise	Li Ning; China	Lou Yun; China	Philippe Vatuone; France
Pommel horse	Li Ning; China	none awarded	Timothy Daggett; United States
Pommel horse	Peter Vidmar; United States	none awarded	Timothy Daggett; United States
Rings	Koji Gushiken; Japan	none awarded	Mitchell Gaylord; United States
Rings	Li Ning; China	none awarded	Mitchell Gaylord; United States
Vault	Lou Yun; China	Mitchell Gaylord; United States	none awarded
Vault	Lou Yun; China	Koji Gushiken; Japan	none awarded
Vault	Lou Yun; China	Shinji Morisue; Japan	none awarded
Vault	Lou Yun; China	Li Ning; China	none awarded
Parallel bars	Bart Conner; United States	Nobuyuki Kajitani; Japan	Mitchell Gaylord; United States
Horizontal bar	Shinji Morisue; Japan	Tong Fei; China	Koji Gushiken; Japan

=== Women's events ===
Games	Gold	Silver	Bronze
Team all-around	Romania; Lavinia Agache; Laura Cutina; Cristina Elena Grigoraș; Simona Păucă; Ecaterina Szabo; Mihaela Stănuleț	United States; Pamela Bileck; Michelle Dusserre; Kathy Johnson; Julianne McNamara; Mary Lou Retton; Tracee Talavera	China; Chen Yongyan; Huang Qun; Ma Yanhong; Wu Jiani; Zhou Ping; Zhou Qiurui
Individual all-around	Mary Lou Retton; United States	Ecaterina Szabo; Romania	Simona Păucă; Romania
Vault	Ecaterina Szabo; Romania	Mary Lou Retton; United States	Lavinia Agache; Romania
Uneven bars	Ma Yanhong; China	none awarded	Mary Lou Retton; United States
Uneven bars	Julianne McNamara; United States	none awarded	Mary Lou Retton; United States
Balance beam	Simona Păucă; Romania	none awarded	Kathy Johnson; United States
Balance beam	Ecaterina Szabo; Romania	none awarded	Kathy Johnson; United States
Floor exercise	Ecaterina Szabo; Romania	Julianne McNamara; United States	Mary Lou Retton; United States

== Rhythmic gymnastics ==
Games	Gold	Silver	Bronze
Individual all-around	Lori Fung; Canada	Doina Staiculescu; Romania	Regina Weber; West Germany

== Medal table ==
Rank	Nation	Gold	Silver	Bronze	Total
1	United States	5	5	6	16
2	China	5	4	2	11
3	Romania	5	2	2	9
4	Japan	3	3	3	9
5	Canada	1	0	0	1
6	France	0	0	1	1
6	West Germany	0	0	1	1
Totals (7 entries)		19	14	15	48

== See also ==
- Gymnastics at the 1982 Asian Games
- Gymnastics at the 1983 Pan American Games
- 1983 World Artistic Gymnastics Championships
- Gymnastics at the Friendship Games
