= List of medalists at the FIG World Cup Final =

The FIG World Cup Final was a prestigious international gymnastics competition organized by the International Gymnastics Federation (FIG). Held intermittently, this event served as the culminating competition for the annual FIG World Cup series, gathering the top-ranked gymnasts across various disciplines. The Final featured medal events across Artistic Gymnastics (Men's and Women's), Rhythmic Gymnastics, Aerobic Gymnastics, and Acrobatic Gymnastics, depending on the edition. This list details all medalists who have competed and placed in the various events throughout the history of the FIG World Cup Final.

== Acrobatic gymnastics ==
=== IFSA era ===
1975

Event	Gold	Silver	Bronze	Ref.
Men's individual tumbling	(Soviet Union) Yuri Sikunov	(Bulgaria) Raieto Kolev	(Poland) Rostek Leszek	
Women's individual tumbling	(Soviet Union) Hadeshda Alaslobeyschikova	(Bulgaria) Vania Babkina	(Poland) Elzhita Krzepowska	
Men's pair	Soviet Union	Switzerland	None awarded	
Women's pair	Bulgaria	West Germany	Poland	
Mixed pair	Soviet Union	Bulgaria	Poland	
Men's group	Soviet Union	Bulgaria	West Germany	
Women's group	Poland	Soviet Union	None awarded	

1977

Event	Gold	Silver	Bronze	Ref.
Men's individual tumbling	(Soviet Union) Aleksander Rasolin	(United States) Steve Elliott	(Poland) Rostek Leszek	
Women's individual tumbling	(Soviet Union) Ludmila Siganova	(Poland) Grazyna Kosmala	(Bulgaria) Mela Mustafova	
Men's pair	Soviet Union	Bulgaria	Poland	
Women's pair	Soviet Union	Poland	Hungary	
Mixed pair	Bulgaria	Poland	West Germany	
Men's group	Soviet Union	Poland	Bulgaria	
Women's group	Soviet Union	Poland	Bulgaria	

1981

Event	Gold	Silver	Bronze	Ref.
Men's individual tumbling all-around	(Soviet Union) Aleksander Rasolin	(Soviet Union) Igor Brigman	(Poland) Andrzej Garstka (China) Xinggang Hu	
Men's individual tumbling first exercise	(Soviet Union) Aleksander Rasolin	(Poland) Andrzej Garstka (Soviet Union) Igor Brigman	(China) Xinggang Hu (United States) Steve Elliott	
Men's individual tumbling second exercise	(Poland) Andrzej Garstka	(Soviet Union) Aleksander Rasolin	(China) Xinggang Hu (Soviet Union) Igor Brigman (United States) Steve Elliott	
Women's individual tumbling all-around	(Soviet Union) Lyudmila Gramova	(Bulgaria) Mela Mustafova	(Bulgaria) Vania Vasileva	
Women's individual tumbling first exercise	(Soviet Union) Lyudmila Gramova	(China) Cao Zhongying	(Bulgaria) Mela Mustafova	
Women's individual tumbling second exercise	(Soviet Union) Lyudmila Gramova	(Bulgaria) Vania Vasileva	(Bulgaria) Mela Mustafova	
Men's pair all-around	Soviet Union	China	Poland	
Men's pair first exercise	Soviet Union	China	Poland	
Men's pair second exercise	Soviet Union	Bulgaria	China	
Women's pair all-around	Bulgaria	China	Soviet Union	
Women's pair first exercise	Bulgaria; Soviet Union	China	Poland	
Women's pair second exercise	China	Bulgaria	Poland	
Mixed pair all-around	Soviet Union	Bulgaria	China	
Mixed pair first exercise	Soviet Union	Bulgaria	China	
Mixed pair second exercise	Soviet Union	Bulgaria	China	
Men's group all-around	China	Soviet Union	Bulgaria	
Men's group first exercise	China; Soviet Union	Poland	West Germany	
Men's group second exercise	Soviet Union	China	Bulgaria	
Women's group all-around	China	Soviet Union	Poland	
Women's group first exercise	Soviet Union	China	Bulgaria	
Women's group second exercise	Soviet Union	Poland	China	

1983

Event	Gold	Silver	Bronze	Ref.
Men's individual tumbling overall	(China) Hu Zingyang	(Bulgaria) Plamen Issionov	(Poland) Andrzej Garstka	
Men's individual tumbling straight	(United States) Steve Elliott	(Poland) Andrzej Garstka	(United Kingdom) Ian Mathews	
Men's individual tumbling twist	(China) Hu Zingyang	(Poland) Andrzej Garstka	(United States) Jerry Hardy	
Women's individual tumbling overall	(Bulgaria) Mela Mustafova	(China) Cao Zhongying	(Bulgaria) Penka Nenova	
Women's individual tumbling straight	(Bulgaria) Mela Mustafova	(United Kingdom) Kim Hetherington	(United States) Michelle Spillman	
Women's individual tumbling twist	(Bulgaria) Penka Nenova	(China) Zhao Yibo	(United States) Jill Hollembeak	
Men's pair overall	China	Bulgaria	Poland	
Men's pair balance	Bulgaria; China	None awarded	Poland	
Men's pair tempo	China	Bulgaria	Poland	
Women's pair overall	China	Poland	Bulgaria	
Women's pair balance	Bulgaria	China	Poland	
Women's pair tempo	China	Poland	West Germany	
Mixed pair overall	Bulgaria	China	United States	
Mixed pair balance	Bulgaria	China	United States	
Mixed pair tempo	Bulgaria	China	United States	
Men's group overall	China	Bulgaria	Poland	
Men's group balance	China	Bulgaria	Poland	
Men's group tempo	China	Poland	Bulgaria	
Women's group overall	Bulgaria	Poland	China	
Women's group balance	Bulgaria	China	West Germany	
Women's group tempo	Poland	Bulgaria; China	None awarded	

1985

Event	Gold	Silver	Bronze	Ref.
Men's individual tumbling overall	(Soviet Union) Igor Brigman	(China) Feng Tao	(China) Chao Chunhua	
Men's individual tumbling straight	(Soviet Union) Igor Brigman	(China) Chao Chunhua	(Bulgaria) Svetoslav Slavov	
Men's individual tumbling twist	(China) Feng Tao	(Soviet Union) Zij Mazmazashvilli	(Bulgaria) Tzvetoliub Stoytzev	
Women's individual tumbling overall	(China) Huang Ruifeng (China) Yao Zhihua	(Soviet Union) Elena Burgaeva	(Bulgaria) Penka Nenova	
Women's individual tumbling straight	(China) Huang Ruifeng	(Soviet Union) Lyudmila Gramova	(Bulgaria) Meli Markova (Poland) Dorota Poplavska	
Women's individual tumbling twist	(Soviet Union) Elena Burgaeva (China) Yao Zhihua	(Bulgaria) Penka Nenova	(United States) Jill Hollembeak	
Men's pair overall	China	Soviet Union	Bulgaria	
Men's pair balance	China; Soviet Union	Bulgaria	None awarded	
Men's pair tempo	Soviet Union	China	Bulgaria	
Women's pair overall	Bulgaria	Soviet Union	China; West Germany	
Women's pair balance	Bulgaria	Soviet Union	China	
Women's pair tempo	Bulgaria	Soviet Union	China	
Mixed pair overall	Soviet Union	Bulgaria; China	None awarded	
Mixed pair balance	Soviet Union	Bulgaria	China	
Mixed pair tempo	Soviet Union	Bulgaria	China	
Men's group overall	China	Soviet Union	Bulgaria	
Men's group balance	Soviet Union	China	Bulgaria	
Men's group tempo	Bulgaria	China	Soviet Union	
Women's group overall	Soviet Union	China	United Kingdom	
Women's group balance	Soviet Union	China	West Germany	
Women's group tempo	China; Soviet Union	United Kingdom	West Germany	

1987

Event	Gold	Silver	Bronze	Ref.
Men's individual tumbling overall	(Soviet Union) Sergei Pogiba	(China) Feng Tao	(Soviet Union) Sergei Ivanov	
Men's individual tumbling straight	(China) Feng Tao	(Soviet Union) Sergei Pogiba	(Bulgaria) Svetoslav Slavov	
Men's individual tumbling twist	(Soviet Union) Sergei Pogiba	(China) Xinggang Hu	(Bulgaria) Yordan Tzintzarsky	
Women's individual tumbling overall	(Soviet Union) Elena Burgaeva	(Bulgaria) Penka Nenova	(China) Huang Ruifeng	
Women's individual tumbling straight	(China) Huang Ruifeng	(Bulgaria) Penka Nenova	(United Kingdom) Philippa Musikant	
Women's individual tumbling twist	(Bulgaria) Penka Nenova	(Soviet Union) Irina Medvedeva	(China) Yuping Zhong	
Men's pair overall	Soviet Union	China	Poland	
Men's pair balance	Soviet Union	China	Poland	
Men's pair tempo	Soviet Union	China	Poland	
Women's pair overall	Soviet Union	China	Bulgaria	
Women's pair balance	China	Soviet Union	Bulgaria	
Women's pair tempo	Soviet Union	Bulgaria	China	
Mixed pair overall	Soviet Union	Bulgaria	China	
Mixed pair balance	Bulgaria	Soviet Union	China	
Mixed pair tempo	Bulgaria; Soviet Union	None awarded	China	
Men's group overall	China	Soviet Union	Poland	
Men's group balance	China	Poland	Soviet Union	
Men's group tempo	China	Soviet Union	Poland	
Women's group overall	Bulgaria	China	Poland	
Women's group balance	Bulgaria	China	West Germany	
Women's group tempo	Bulgaria	China	Poland	

1989

Event	Gold	Silver	Bronze	Ref.
Men's individual tumbling overall	(Soviet Union) Aleksei Kryzhanovsky	(Poland) Krzysztof Wilusz	(China) Hu Ming	
Men's individual tumbling straight	(United States) Steve Elliott	(Soviet Union) Aleksei Kryzhanovsky	(France) Christophe Lambert	
Men's individual tumbling twist	(France) Pascal Eouzan	(Soviet Union) Evgeniy Ivanov	(United States) Jon Beck	
Women's individual tumbling overall	(Soviet Union) Lyudmila Gramova	(China) Yao Zhihua	(United States) Stephanie Webb	
Women's individual tumbling straight	(Soviet Union) Lyudmila Gramova	(Bulgaria) Mariela Manolova	(United Kingdom) Philippa Musikant (Hungary) Ildiko Dragomer (United States) Stephanie Webb	
Women's individual tumbling twist	(Soviet Union) Lyudmila Gramova	(China) Yao Zhihua	(United States) Stephanie Webb	
Men's pair overall	China; Soviet Union	None awarded	Bulgaria	
Men's pair balance	China; Soviet Union	None awarded	Bulgaria	
Men's pair tempo	China	Soviet Union	Poland	
Women's pair overall	Bulgaria	China	Soviet Union	
Women's pair balance	Bulgaria; China	None awarded	Soviet Union	
Women's pair tempo	Bulgaria	China	Poland	
Mixed pair overall	Bulgaria; Soviet Union	None awarded	China	
Mixed pair balance	Bulgaria; Soviet Union	None awarded	China	
Mixed pair tempo	China; Soviet Union	None awarded	Bulgaria	
Men's group overall	Bulgaria	Soviet Union	China	
Men's group balance	Soviet Union	Hungary	China	
Men's group tempo	China	Bulgaria	Soviet Union	
Women's group overall	Bulgaria	Soviet Union	China	
Women's group balance	Bulgaria	Soviet Union	China	
Women's group tempo	Bulgaria	China	Soviet Union	

1991

Event	Gold	Silver	Bronze	Ref.
Men's individual tumbling	(Soviet Union) Aleksey Kryzhanovsky	(China) Chen Bo	(Soviet Union) Evgeniy Ivanov	
Women's individual tumbling	(Soviet Union) Natalia Kadatova	(France) Chrystel Robert	(United Kingdom) Philippa Musikant	
Men's pair	China; Soviet Union	None awarded	Bulgaria	
Women's pair	Bulgaria; Soviet Union	None awarded	China	
Mixed pair	China; Soviet Union	None awarded	Poland	
Men's group	Soviet Union	West Germany; United Kingdom	None awarded	
Women's group	Soviet Union	China	North Korea	

1993

Event	Gold	Silver	Bronze	Ref.
Men's individual tumbling overall	(Russia) Vladimir Ignatenko	(Ukraine) Yuri Pedorenko	(China) Chen Bo	
Men's individual tumbling somersault	(Russia) Vladimir Ignatenko	(China) Chen Bo	(Ukraine) Yuri Pedorenko	
Men's individual tumbling twist	(Ukraine) Yuri Pedorenko	(Bulgaria) Pavel Pavlov	(China) Chen Bo	
Women's individual tumbling overall	(Russia) Tatyana Paniyvan	(Russia) Natalia Borisenko	(France) Chrystel Robert	
Women's individual tumbling sommersault	(Russia) Tatyana Paniyvan	(France) Chrystel Robert	(China) Yuping Zhong	
Women's individual tumbling twist	(China) Xiangqi Wang	(Kazakhstan) Tatiana Fedorchenko	(Russia) Natalia Borisenko	
Men's pair overall	China; Russia	None awarded	Bulgaria	
Men's pair balance	China	Bulgaria	Poland	
Men's pair tempo	China	Russia	Bulgaria	
Women's pair overall	Russia	China	Bulgaria	
Women's pair balance	China	Bulgaria	Germany	
Women's pair tempo	Russia	China	Bulgaria	
Mixed pair overall	China	Russia	Bulgaria	
Mixed pair balance	China	Bulgaria	Russia	
Mixed pair tempo	China	Russia	Bulgaria	
Men's group overall	China	(Georgia (country)) Georgia	Poland	
Men's group balance	China	Russia	Azerbaijan (Georgia (country)) Georgia	
Men's group tempo	China	Azerbaijan	Poland	
Women's group overall	China	Russia	Poland	
Women's group balance	China	Poland	Russia	
Women's group tempo	Russia	China	Poland	

=== FIG era ===
2003

Event	Gold	Silver	Bronze	Ref.
Mixed pair	Russia	United Kingdom	Portugal	
Men's pair	Russia	Belgium	Ukraine	
Men's group	Russia	United Kingdom	Ukraine	
Women's group	Russia	Ukraine	Belarus	

2007

Event	Gold	Silver	Bronze	Ref.
Women's pair	Belarus	Belarus	Ukraine	
Mixed pair	Russia	United States	Belarus	
Men's pair	Russia	Portugal	United Kingdom	
Women's pair	Belarus	Belarus	Ukraine	
Women's group	Belarus	Russia	United States	

== Aerobic gymnastics ==
2001

Event	Gold	Silver	Bronze	Ref.
Men's individual	(France) Grégory Alcan	(Iceland) Halldör Johannsson	(Russia) Vassili Kozyrev	
Women's individual	(Romania) Izabela Lăcătuș	(Romania) Mihaela Pohoata	(Italy) Giovanna Lecis	
Mixed pair	Romania	Russia	France	
Trio	France	Romania	Bulgaria	

2003

Event	Gold	Silver	Bronze	Ref.
Men's individual	(Spain) Jonatan Cañada	(France) Grégory Alcan	(Russia) Stanislav Marchenkov	
Women's individual	(Romania) Izabela Lăcătuș	(Italy) Giovanna Lecis	(Japan) Yuriko Ito	
Mixed pair	Romania	Russia	Italy	
Trio	Chile	France	Romania	
Group	Russia	France	Italy	

2007

Event	Gold	Silver	Bronze	Ref.
Men's individual	(China) Ao Jinping	(Spain) Ivan Parejo	(Romania) Mircea Zamfir	
Women's individual	(Spain) Elmira Dassaeva	(Italy) Arianna Ciucci	(France) Aurélie Joly	
Mixed pair	Italy	France	China	
Trio	Romania	China	France	
Group	China	Romania	France	

== Artistic gymnastics ==
1975

Event	Gold	Silver	Bronze	Ref.
Men's individual all-around	(Soviet Union) Nikolay Andrianov	(Japan) Hiroshi Kajiyama	(Soviet Union) Aleksandr Dityatin	
Women's individual all-around	(Soviet Union) Ludmilla Tourischeva	(Soviet Union) Olga Korbut	(Hungary) Márta Egervári (Soviet Union) Elvira Saadi	
Men's floor exercise	(Japan) Hiroshi Kajiyama	(Soviet Union) Nikolay Andrianov	(Soviet Union) Vladimir Safronov	
Men's pommel horse	(Hungary) Zoltán Magyar	(Soviet Union) Nikolay Andrianov	(Japan) Hiroshi Kajiyama	
Men's still rings	(Japan) Mitsuo Tsukahara	(Japan) Fumio Honma	(Romania) Dan Grecu	
Men's vault	(Soviet Union) Paata Shamugia	(Japan) Hiroshi Kajiyama	(Soviet Union) Vladimir Safronov	
Men's parallel bars	(Soviet Union) Nikolay Andrianov	(Japan) Hiroshi Kajiyama (Japan) Mitsuo Tsukahara	None awarded	
Men's horizontal bar	(Japan) Mitsuo Tsukahara	(West Germany) Eberhard Gienger	(Japan) Hiroshi Kajiyama	
Women's vault	(Soviet Union) Ludmilla Tourischeva	(Soviet Union) Elvira Saadi (Soviet Union) Olga Koval	None awarded	
Women's uneven bars	(Soviet Union) Ludmilla Tourischeva	(Soviet Union) Lidia Gorbik	(Soviet Union) Elvira Saadi	
Women's balance beam	(Soviet Union) Ludmilla Tourischeva	(Hungary) Márta Egervári	(Soviet Union) Elvira Saadi	
Women's floor exercise	(Soviet Union) Ludmilla Tourischeva	(Romania) Teodora Ungureanu (Soviet Union) Elvira Saadi	None awarded	

1977

Event	Gold	Silver	Bronze	Ref.
Men's individual all-around	(Soviet Union) Nikolay Andrianov (Soviet Union) Vladimir Markelov	None awarded	(Soviet Union) Aleksandr Tkachyov	
Women's individual all-around	(Soviet Union) Maria Filatova	(East Germany) Steffi Kräker	(Soviet Union) Natalia Shaposhnikova	
Men's floor exercise	(Soviet Union) Nikolay Andrianov	(Soviet Union) Aleksandr Tkachyov	(Soviet Union) Vladimir Markelov	
Men's pommel horse	(Soviet Union) Vladimir Markelov (East Germany) Michael Nikolay	None awarded	(Soviet Union) Aleksandr Tkachyov	
Men's still rings	(Soviet Union) Nikolay Andrianov	(Soviet Union) Vladimir Markelov	(Soviet Union) Aleksandr Tkachyov	
Men's vault	(Soviet Union) Vladimir Markelov	(Soviet Union) Nikolay Andrianov	(East Germany) Roland Brückner	
Men's parallel bars	(Soviet Union) Nikolay Andrianov	(Soviet Union) Vladimir Markelov	(Japan) Sawao Kato	
Men's horizontal bar	(West Germany) Eberhard Gienger (Soviet Union) Vladimir Markelov (Soviet Union) Aleksandr Tkachyov	None awarded	None awarded	
Women's vault	(Soviet Union) Natalia Shaposhnikova	(Soviet Union) Maria Filatova	(Hungary) Márta Egervári	
Women's uneven bars	(Soviet Union) Elena Mukhina	(Soviet Union) Maria Filatova	(East Germany) Steffi Kräker	
Women's balance beam	(Soviet Union) Elena Mukhina	(East Germany) Steffi Kräker	(Romania) Anca Grigoraș	
Women's floor exercise	(Soviet Union) Maria Filatova	(Czechoslovakia) Vera Cerna (East Germany) Steffi Kräker	None awarded	

1978

Event	Gold	Silver	Bronze	Ref.
Men's individual all-around	(Soviet Union) Aleksandr Dityatin	(United States) Kurt Thomas	(Soviet Union) Eduard Azaryan	
Women's individual all-around	(Soviet Union) Maria Filatova	(East Germany) Silvia Hindorff	(Soviet Union) Natalia Shaposhnikova	
Men's floor exercise	(East Germany) Roland Brückner	(United States) Kurt Thomas	(Soviet Union) Aleksandr Dityatin	
Men's pommel horse	(Hungary) Zoltan Magyar	(Soviet Union) Aleksandr Dityatin	(United States) Kurt Thomas	
Men's still rings	(Soviet Union) Aleksandr Dityatin	(Romania) Dan Grecu	(Soviet Union) Eduard Azarian (Japan) Junichi Shimizu	
Men's vault	(Japan) Junichi Shimizu	(East Germany) Roland Brückner	(Soviet Union) Aleksandr Dityatin	
Men's parallel bars	(Soviet Union) Eduard Azaryan	(West Germany) Eberhard Gienger (United States) Bart Conner	None awarded	
Men's horizontal bar	(West Germany) Eberhard Gienger	(United States) Kurt Thomas	(Soviet Union) Aleksandr Dityatin (Soviet Union) Aleksandr Tkachyov	
Women's vault	(Soviet Union) Natalia Shaposhnikova	(United States) Rhonda Schwandt	(East Germany) Steffi Kräker	
Women's uneven bars	(East Germany) Steffi Kräker	(Czechoslovakia) Vera Cerna	(United States) Rhonda Schwandt	
Women's balance beam	(Czechoslovakia) Vera Cerna	(Soviet Union) Natalia Shaposhnikova	(Soviet Union) Svetlana Agapova	
Women's floor exercise	(Soviet Union) Maria Filatova	(Soviet Union) Natalia Shaposhnikova	(United States) Kathy Johnson	

1979

Event	Gold	Silver	Bronze	Ref.
Men's individual all-around	(Soviet Union) Aleksandr Dityatin	(Japan) Shigeru Kasamatsu	(Bulgaria) Stoyan Deltchev	
Women's individual all-around	(Soviet Union) Stella Zakharova	(Soviet Union) Nellie Kim (Romania) Emilia Eberle	None awarded	
Men's floor exercise	(Japan) Shigeru Kasamatsu (Bulgaria) Stoyan Deltchev	None awarded	(Japan) Hiroshi Kajiyama	
Men's pommel horse	(United States) Bart Conner	(Japan) Shigeru Kasamatsu	(United States) Kurt Thomas	
Men's still rings	(Soviet Union) Aleksandr Dityatin	(Soviet Union) Eduard Azarian	(Japan) Hiroshi Kajiyama (Hungary) Ferenc Donath	
Men's vault	(East Germany) Ralph Bartel	(Soviet Union) Aleksandr Dityatin (Soviet Union) Valentin Turbanov	None awarded	
Men's parallel bars	(Japan) Eizo Kenmotsu	(Soviet Union) Aleksandr Dityatin	(Hungary) Ferenc Donath	
Men's horizontal bar	(West Germany) Eberhard Gienger	(Japan) Eizo Kenmotsu (Soviet Union) Aleksandr Dityatin (Japan) Hiroshi Kajiyama	None awarded	
Women's vault	(Romania) Nadia Comăneci	(Soviet Union) Stella Zakharova	(Soviet Union) Nellie Kim	
Women's uneven bars	(East Germany) Steffi Kräker (Romania) Emilia Eberle	None awarded	(Soviet Union) Stella Zakharova (Czechoslovakia) Vera Cerna (Hungary) Zsuzsa Kalmar	
Women's balance beam	(Romania) Emilia Eberle	(Romania) Nadia Comăneci	(Soviet Union) Nellie Kim (East Germany) Steffi Kräker	
Women's floor exercise	(Romania) Nadia Comăneci	(Soviet Union) Stella Zakharova	(Romania) Emilia Eberle	

1980

Event	Gold	Silver	Bronze	Ref.
Men's individual all-around	(Soviet Union) Bogdan Makuts	(Soviet Union) Eduard Azaryan	(Japan) Koji Gushiken	
Women's individual all-around	(Soviet Union) Stella Zakharova	(East Germany) Maxi Gnauck	(East Germany) Steffi Kräker	
Men's floor exercise	(East Germany) Roland Brückner	(China) Li Yuejiu (Czechoslovakia) Jiří Tabák	None awarded	
Men's pommel horse	(East Germany) Roland Brückner	(Japan) Toshiomi Nishiki (Japan) Koji Gushiken	None awarded	
Men's still rings	(Soviet Union) Bogdan Makuts (China) Huang Yubin	None awarded	(Japan) Toshiomi Nishiki (Japan) Koji Gushiken	
Men's vault	(East Germany) Roland Brückner	(Soviet Union) Bogdan Makuts (Japan) Hiroshi Kajiyama	None awarded	
Men's parallel bars	(China) Li Yuejiu	(Soviet Union) Bogdan Makuts	(China) Huang Yubin	
Men's horizontal bar	(China) Li Yuejiu (Soviet Union) Bogdan Makuts (Japan) Toshiomi Nishiki	None awarded	None awarded	
Women's vault	(Soviet Union) Stella Zakharova	(Czechoslovakia) Jana Labakova	(Romania) Cristina Grigoraș (Canada) Elfi Schlegel	
Women's uneven bars	(East Germany) Maxi Gnauck	(East Germany) Steffi Kräker	(China) Zhu Zheng	
Women's balance beam	(Soviet Union) Elena Naimushina	(Czechoslovakia) Radka Zemanova (Soviet Union) Maria Filatova	None awarded	
Women's floor exercise	(East Germany) Maxi Gnauck	(Soviet Union) Elena Naimushina (Soviet Union) Stella Zakharova	None awarded	

1982

Event	Gold	Silver	Bronze	Ref.
Men's individual all-around	(China) Li Ning	(China) Tong Fei	(Soviet Union) Yuri Korolev	
Women's individual all-around	(Soviet Union) Natalia Yurchenko (Soviet Union) Olga Bicherova	None awarded	(Romania) Lavinia Agache	
Men's floor exercise	(China) Li Ning	(Soviet Union) Yuri Korolev	(China) Tong Fei (Japan) Nobuyuki Kajitani	
Men's pommel horse	(China) Li Ning	(Soviet Union) Yuri Korolev	(Soviet Union) Bogdan Makuts	
Men's still rings	(China) Li Ning	(Soviet Union) Yuri Korolev	(China) Tong Fei	
Men's vault	(China) Li Ning	(Japan) Koji Gushiken	(Soviet Union) Yuri Korolev (China) Tong Fei	
Men's parallel bars	(Soviet Union) Yuri Korolev	(Japan) Koji Gushiken	(China) Li Ning (Japan) Nobuyuki Kajitani	
Men's horizontal bar	(China) Tong Fei (China) Li Ning	None awarded	(United States) Peter Vidmar	
Women's vault	(Soviet Union) Natalia Yurchenko (Soviet Union) Olga Bicherova	None awarded	(United States) Julianne McNamara	
Women's uneven bars	(East Germany) Maxi Gnauck	(Soviet Union) Natalia Yurchenko (Soviet Union) Olga Bicherova	None awarded	
Women's balance beam	(Soviet Union) Natalia Yurchenko	(China) Wu Jiani	(Soviet Union) Olga Bicherova	
Women's floor exercise	(Soviet Union) Olga Bicherova	(Romania) Lavinia Agache	(East Germany) Maxi Gnauck	

1986

Event	Gold	Silver	Bronze	Ref.
Men's individual all-around	(China) Li Ning (Soviet Union) Yuri Korolev	None awarded	(Soviet Union) Vladimir Artemov	
Women's individual all-around	(Soviet Union) Elena Shushunova	(Romania) Daniela Silivaş	(Soviet Union) Oksana Omelianchik	
Men's floor exercise	(China) Li Ning	(Soviet Union) Yuri Korolev	(East Germany) Sylvio Kroll	
Men's pommel horse	(China) Li Ning	(Soviet Union) Valentin Mogilny	(China) Xu Zhiqiang	
Men's still rings	(Soviet Union) Valentin Mogilny (Soviet Union) Yuri Korolev	None awarded	(China) Li Ning	
Men's vault	(Soviet Union) Yuri Korolev	(East Germany) Sylvio Kroll	(China) Xu Zhiqiang	
Men's parallel bars	(Soviet Union) Valentin Mogilny (China) Xu Zhiqiang	None awarded	(Soviet Union) Yuri Korolev	
Men's horizontal bar	(Soviet Union) Yuri Korolev	(East Germany) Sylvio Kroll	(Italy) Boris Preti	
Women's vault	(Soviet Union) Elena Shushunova	(Soviet Union) Oksana Omelianchik	(Romania) Ecaterina Szabo	
Women's uneven bars	(Soviet Union) Elena Shushunova	(Soviet Union) Oksana Omelianchik	(Romania) Daniela Silivaş	
Women's balance beam	(Soviet Union) Oksana Omelianchik	(Romania) Daniela Silivaş	(Soviet Union) Elena Shushunova	
Women's floor exercise	(Soviet Union) Elena Shushunova	(Romania) Camelia Voinea	(Soviet Union) Oksana Omelianchik	

1990

Event	Gold	Silver	Bronze	Ref.
Men's individual all-around	(Soviet Union) Valeri Belenki	(Soviet Union) Vitaly Scherbo	(China) Li Jing	
Women's individual all-around	(Soviet Union) Tatiana Lysenko	(Soviet Union) Svetlana Boguinskaya	(Hungary) Henrietta Ónodi	
Men's floor exercise	(Soviet Union) Vitaly Scherbo	(Soviet Union) Valeri Belenki	(Italy) Juri Chechi	
Men's pommel horse	(China) Li Jing	(Soviet Union) Valeri Belenki	(West Germany) Andreas Wecker	
Men's still rings	(Soviet Union) Valeri Belenki	(China) Li Jing	(Soviet Union) Vitaly Scherbo	
Men's vault	(Soviet Union) Vitaly Scherbo	(Japan) Daisuke Nishikawa	(Soviet Union) Valeri Belenki (China) Li Jing	
Men's parallel bars	(Soviet Union) Valeri Belenki	(Japan) Daisuke Nishikawa (China) Li Jing	None awarded	
Men's horizontal bar	(Soviet Union) Valeri Belenki (Japan) Daisuke Nishikawa (China) Li Jing	None awarded	None awarded	
Women's vault	(Hungary) Henrietta Ónodi	(Spain) Eva Rueda	(Soviet Union) Svetlana Boguinskaya	
Women's uneven bars	(Soviet Union) Tatiana Lysenko	(Romania) Mirela Pasca	(Hungary) Henrietta Ónodi	
Women's balance beam	(China) Yang Bo	(China) Li Li	(Romania) Cristina Bontaș	
Women's floor exercise	(Soviet Union) Svetlana Boguinskaya	(Hungary) Henrietta Ónodi	(Soviet Union) Tatiana Lysenko (Romania) Mirela Pasca	

1998

Event	Gold	Silver	Bronze	Ref.
Men's floor exercise	(China) Li Xiaopeng	(Russia) Aleksei Nemov	(Japan) Isao Yoneda	
Men's pommel horse	(France) Eric Poujade (Romania) Marius Urzică (China) Zhang Jingjin	None awarded	None awarded	
Men's still rings	(Hungary) Szilveszter Csollány	(Belarus) Ivan Ivankov	(Japan) Shigeru Kurihara	
Men's vault	(Russia) Aleksei Nemov	(Russia) Aleksei Bondarenko	(Kazakhstan) Sergei Fedorchenko	
Men's parallel bars	(Kazakhstan) Aleksey Dmitrienko (China) Li Xiaopeng (China) Zhang Jingjin	None awarded	None awarded	
Men's horizontal bar	(Belarus) Ivan Ivankov	(Kazakhstan) Sergei Fedorchenko	(Hungary) Zoltán Supola	
Women's vault	(Romania) Simona Amânar	(Romania) Gina Gogean	(China) Kui Yuanyuan	
Women's uneven bars	(China) Bi Wenjing	(Russia) Svetlana Khorkina	(China) Liu Xuan	
Women's balance beam	(China) Liu Xuan	(China) Kui Yuanyuan	(Romania) Gina Gogean	
Women's floor exercise	(Romania) Simona Amânar	(Romania) Gina Gogean	(Belarus) Alena Polozkova	

2000

Event	Gold	Silver	Bronze	Ref.
Men's floor exercise	(Spain) Gervasio Deferr	(Canada) Kyle Shewfelt (Bulgaria) Yordan Yovchev	None awarded	
Men's pommel horse	(Romania) Marius Urzică	(Belarus) Ivan Ivankov	(China) Xing Aowei	
Men's still rings	(Hungary) Szilveszter Csollány	(Bulgaria) Yordan Yovchev	(Belarus) Ivan Ivankov	
Men's vault	(Romania) Marian Drăgulescu	(Spain) Gervasio Deferr	(Latvia) Jevgēņijs Saproņenko	
Men's parallel bars	(Slovenia) Mitja Petkovšek	(Russia) Alexei Bondarenko	(Slovenia) Aljaž Pegan (South Korea) Lee Joo-hyung	
Men's horizontal bar	(Ukraine) Alexander Beresch	(Slovenia) Aljaž Pegan	(Canada) Alexander Jeltkov	
Women's vault	(Russia) Elena Zamolodchikova	(Romania) Simona Amânar	(Poland) Joanna Skowrońska	
Women's uneven bars	(China) Ling Jie	(Australia) Allana Slater	(Romania) Andreea Răducan	
Women's balance beam	(Romania) Andreea Răducan	(Romania) Simona Amânar	(China) Ling Jie	
Women's floor exercise	(Romania) Andreea Răducan	(Russia) Elena Zamolodchikova	(China) Dong Fangxiao (Romania) Simona Amânar	

2002

Event	Gold	Silver	Bronze	Ref.
Men's floor exercise	(Romania) Marian Drăgulescu	(Canada) Kyle Shewfelt	(Bulgaria) Yordan Yovchev	
Men's pommel horse	(Romania) Marius Urzică	(Romania) Ioan Silviu Suciu	(China) Huang Xu	
Men's still rings	(Bulgaria) Yordan Yovchev	(Italy) Andrea Coppolino	(Hungary) Szilveszter Csollány (United States) Sean Townsend	
Men's vault	(China) Lu Bin	(Poland) Leszek Blanik	(Romania) Marian Drăgulescu	
Men's parallel bars	(China) Li Xiaopeng	(China) Huang Xu	(United States) Sean Townsend	
Men's horizontal bar	(Slovenia) Aljaž Pegan	(Australia) Philippe Rizzo	(Germany) Sven Kwiatkowski	
Women's vault	(Russia) Elena Zamolodchikova (Uzbekistan) Oksana Chusovitina	None awarded	(Netherlands) Verona van de Leur	
Women's uneven bars	(Romania) Oana Petrovschi	(Australia) Jaqui Dunn	(Netherlands) Verona van de Leur	
Women's balance beam	(China) Sun Xiaojiao	(Russia) Elena Zamolodchikova	(Uzbekistan) Oksana Chusovitina	
Women's floor exercise	(Netherlands) Verona van de Leur	(China) Zhang Nan	(Australia) Allana Slater	

2004

Event	Gold	Silver	Bronze	Ref.
Men's floor exercise	(Brazil) Diego Hypólito	(Japan) Isao Yoneda	(Hungary) Róbert Gál	
Men's pommel horse	(China) Xiao Qin	(Romania) Marius Urzică	(Romania) Ioan Silviu Suciu	
Men's still rings	(Netherlands) Yuri van Gelder	(Japan) Hiroyuki Tomita	(Italy) Matteo Morandi	
Men's vault	(China) Lu Bin	(Latvia) Jevgēņijs Saproņenko	(Bulgaria) Filip Yanev	
Men's parallel bars	(Slovenia) Mitja Petkovšek	(China) Huang Xu	(Romania) Marius Urzică	
Men's horizontal bar	(Ukraine) Valeriy Honcharov	(Japan) Isao Yoneda	(Greece) Vlasios Maras	
Women's vault	(United States) Alicia Sacramone	(Romania) Monica Roșu	(Russia) Anna Pavlova	
Women's uneven bars	(United States) Chellsie Memmel	(United Kingdom) Beth Tweddle	(China) Li Ya	
Women's balance beam	(Romania) Cătălina Ponor	(China) Li Ya (Romania) Alexandra Eremia	None awarded	
Women's floor exercise	(Brazil) Daiane dos Santos	(Romania) Cătălina Ponor	(China) Cheng Fei	

2006

Event	Gold	Silver	Bronze	Ref.
Men's floor exercise	(Brazil) Diego Hypólito	(Canada) Kyle Shewfelt	(Canada) Brandon O'Neill	
Men's pommel horse	(China) Xiao Qin	(Hungary) Krisztián Berki	(China) Teng Haibin	
Men's still rings	(Venezuela) Regulo Carmona	(Ukraine) Oleksandr Vorobyov	(Italy) Matteo Angioletti	
Men's vault	(Romania) Marian Drăgulescu	(Russia) Anton Golotsutskov	(Brazil) Diego Hypólito	
Men's parallel bars	(China) Li Xiaopeng	(China) Huang Xu	(Ukraine) Valeriy Honcharov	
Men's horizontal bar	(Greece) Vlasios Maras	(Australia) Philippe Rizzo	(Slovenia) Aljaž Pegan	
Women's vault	(China) Cheng Fei	(Brazil) Laís Souza	(Russia) Elena Zamolodchikova	
Women's uneven bars	(United Kingdom) Beth Tweddle	(China) Li Ya	(Ukraine) Dariya Zgoba	
Women's balance beam	(China) Li Ya	(Brazil) Daniele Hypólito	(Spain) Lenika de Simone	
Women's floor exercise	(Brazil) Daiane dos Santos	(United Kingdom) Beth Tweddle	(Brazil) Laís Souza	

2008

Event	Gold	Silver	Bronze	Ref.
Men's floor exercise	(Brazil) Diego Hypólito	(Japan) Kōhei Uchimura	(Israel) Alexander Shatilov	
Men's pommel horse	(China) Zhang Hongtao	(Hungary) Krisztián Berki	(Australia) Prashanth Sellathurai	
Men's still rings	(Ukraine) Oleksandr Vorobyov	(Bulgaria) Yordan Yovchev	(Netherlands) Yuri van Gelder	
Men's vault	(France) Thomas Bouhail	(Netherlands) Jeffrey Wammes	(Spain) Isaac Botella (Russia) Anton Golotsutskov	
Men's parallel bars	(France) Yann Cucherat (China) Feng Zhe	None awarded	(Ukraine) Valeriy Honcharov	
Men's horizontal bar	(Netherlands) Epke Zonderland	(Australia) Philippe Rizzo	(Japan) Hiroyuki Tomita	
Women's vault	(China) Cheng Fei	(Switzerland) Ariella Kaeslin	(Belgium) Aagje Vanwalleghem	
Women's uneven bars	(China) He Kexin	(China) Jiang Yuyuan	(Japan) Kōko Tsurumi	
Women's balance beam	(Australia) Lauren Mitchell	(Russia) Yulia Lozhechko	(China) Li Shanshan	
Women's floor exercise	(China) Cheng Fei	(China) Jiang Yuyuan	(Romania) Sandra Izbașa	

== Rhythmic gymnastics ==
1983

Event	Gold	Silver	Bronze	Ref.
Individual all-around	(Bulgaria) Lilia Ignatova	(Soviet Union) Dalia Kutkaitė	(Bulgaria) Anelia Ralenkova	
Ball	(Bulgaria) Anelia Ralenkova	(Bulgaria) Lilia Ignatova	(Bulgaria) Iliana Raeva	
Hoop	(Bulgaria) Lilia Ignatova	(Bulgaria) Iliana Raeva	(Soviet Union) Irina Devina	
Clubs	(Bulgaria) Anelia Ralenkova	(Bulgaria) Lilia Ignatova (Bulgaria) Iliana Raeva	None awarded	
Ribbon	(Soviet Union) Dalia Kutkaitė	(Bulgaria) Lilia Ignatova	(Soviet Union) Irina Devina	
Group	Soviet Union	Bulgaria	Japan	

1986

Event	Gold	Silver	Bronze	Ref.
Individual all-around	(Bulgaria) Lilia Ignatova	(Soviet Union) Galina Beloglazova (Soviet Union) Tatiana Druchinina	None awarded	
Rope	(Bulgaria) Lilia Ignatova	(Soviet Union) Marina Lobach	(Bulgaria) Bianka Panova (Soviet Union) Tatiana Druchinina	
Ball	(Bulgaria) Bianka Panova (Bulgaria) Lilia Ignatova	None awarded	(Soviet Union) Galina Beloglazova (Soviet Union) Tatiana Druchinina	
Clubs	(Bulgaria) Lilia Ignatova	(Soviet Union) Tatiana Druchinina	(Bulgaria) Bianka Panova	
Ribbon	(Bulgaria) Bianka Panova	(Bulgaria) Lilia Ignatova	(Soviet Union) Galina Beloglazova	
Group	Bulgaria	Soviet Union	North Korea	

1990

Event	Gold	Silver	Bronze	Ref.
Individual all-around	(Soviet Union) Oksana Skaldina	(Bulgaria) Mila Marinova	(Bulgaria) Julia Baitscheva	
Rope	(Soviet Union) Oksana Skaldina	(Soviet Union) Aleksandra Timoshenko	(Bulgaria) Julia Baitscheva	
Hoop	(Soviet Union) Oksana Skaldina	(Soviet Union) Aleksandra Timoshenko (Bulgaria) Mila Marinova (Bulgaria) Julia Baitscheva	None awarded	
Ball	(Bulgaria) Julia Baitscheva (Soviet Union) Oksana Skaldina	None awarded	(Bulgaria) Mila Marinova	
Ribbon	(Bulgaria) Mila Marinova	(Soviet Union) Oksana Skaldina	(Canada) Mary Fuzesi (Romania) Irina Deleanu	
Group	Soviet Union	Bulgaria	Spain	

2000

Event	Gold	Silver	Bronze	Ref.
Rope	(Russia) Alina Kabaeva	(Russia) Yulia Barsukova	(Russia) Irina Tchachina	
Hoop	(Russia) Yulia Barsukova	(Russia) Alina Kabaeva	(Belarus) Yulia Raskina	
Ball	(Russia) Alina Kabaeva	(Russia) Yulia Barsukova	(Belarus) Yulia Raskina	
Ribbon	(Russia) Alina Kabaeva	(Russia) Yulia Barsukova	(Belarus) Yulia Raskina	

2002

Event	Gold	Silver	Bronze	Ref.
Rope	(Ukraine) Anna Bessonova	(Bulgaria) Simona Peycheva	(Russia) Vera Sessina	
Hoop	(Ukraine) Anna Bessonova	(Russia) Zarina Gizikova	(Ukraine) Tamara Yerofeeva	
Ball	(Bulgaria) Simona Peycheva	(Ukraine) Anna Bessonova	(Ukraine) Tamara Yerofeeva	
Clubs	(Ukraine) Anna Bessonova	(Bulgaria) Simona Peycheva	(Ukraine) Tamara Yerofeeva	

2004

Event	Gold	Silver	Bronze	Ref.
Hoop	(Russia) Alina Kabaeva	(Bulgaria) Simona Peycheva	(Russia) Olga Kapranova	
Ball	(Russia) Irina Tchachina	(Kazakhstan) Aliya Yusupova	(Belarus) Inna Zhukova	
Clubs	(Russia) Irina Tchachina	(Kazakhstan) Aliya Yusupova	(Russia) Olga Kapranova	
Ribbon	(Russia) Alina Kabaeva	(Bulgaria) Simona Peycheva	(Russia) Olga Kapranova	
Group 5 Ribbons	Russia	Poland	Finland	
Group 2 Balls, 3 Hoops	Russia	Poland	Finland	

2006

Event	Gold	Silver	Bronze	Ref.
Rope	(Ukraine) Natalia Godunko	(Russia) Vera Sessina	(Ukraine) Anna Bessonova	
Ball	(Russia) Vera Sessina	(Belarus) Inna Zhukova	(Ukraine) Anna Bessonova	
Clubs	(Russia) Vera Sessina	(Russia) Olga Kapranova	(Ukraine) Natalia Godunko	
Ribbon	(Russia) Vera Sessina	(Ukraine) Natalia Godunko	(Ukraine) Anna Bessonova	
Group 5 Ribbons	Russia	Belarus	Italy	
Group 4 Clubs, 3 Hoops	Belarus	Russia	Bulgaria	

2008

Event	Gold	Silver	Bronze	Ref.
Rope	(Russia) Vera Sessina	(Russia) Olga Kapranova	(Azerbaijan) Aliya Garayeva	
Hoop	(Russia) Evgenia Kanaeva	(Ukraine) Anna Bessonova	(Ukraine) Natalia Godunko	
Clubs	(Russia) Evgenia Kanaeva	(Ukraine) Anna Bessonova	(Russia) Olga Kapranova	
Ribbon	(Russia) Evgenia Kanaeva	(Ukraine) Anna Bessonova	(Russia) Vera Sessina	
Group 5 Ropes	Belarus	Spain	Ukraine	
Group 4 Clubs, 3 Hoops	Belarus	Spain	Ukraine	

== Trampoline and tumbling ==
=== FIT era ===
1993

Event	Gold	Silver	Bronze	Ref.
Men's individual trampoline	(France) Fabrice Schwertz	(Germany) Markus Kubica	(France) Fabrice Henrique	
Women's individual trampoline	(United Kingdom) Andrea Holmes	(United Kingdom) Sue Challis-Shotton	(Georgia (country)) Anna Dogonadze	
Men's synchronized trampoline	Belarus	Ukraine	France	
Women's synchronized trampoline	(Georgia (country)) Georgia	Germany	Belarus	

1995

Event	Gold	Silver	Bronze	Ref.
Men's individual trampoline	(Belarus) Dmitriy Polyarush	(Belarus) Nikolay Kazak	(Ukraine) Sergey Bukhovtsev	
Women's individual trampoline	(United Kingdom) Andrea Holmes	(Russia) Tatyana Kovaleva	(Belarus) Galina Lebedeva	
Men's synchronized trampoline	Netherlands	Denmark	Switzerland	
Women's synchronized trampoline	Russia	Belarus	Germany	

1997

Event	Gold	Silver	Bronze	Ref.
Men's individual trampoline	(France) Emmanuel Durand	(Belarus) Yevgeniy Belyayev	(Russia) German Knychev	
Women's individual trampoline	(Russia) Irina Karavayeva	(Belarus) Galina Lebedeva	(Russia) Natalya Karpenkova	
Men's synchronized trampoline	France	Belarus	Russia	
Women's synchronized trampoline	Russia	Belarus	Netherlands	
Men's individual tumbling	(United States) Rayshine Harris	(Portugal) Luis Nunes	(Poland) Adrian Sienkiewicz	
Women's individual tumbling	(France) Karine Boucher	(United States) Amanda Lentz	(France) Marlene Bayet	

=== FIG era ===
1999

Event	Gold	Silver	Bronze	Ref.
Men's individual trampoline	(Russia) German Knychev	(France) Emmanuel Durand	(France) David Martin	
Women's individual trampoline	(Russia) Irina Karavayeva	(Russia) Tatyana Kovaleva	(Germany) Tina Ludwig	
Men's synchronized trampoline	France	United Kingdom	Japan	
Women's synchronized trampoline	Ukraine	United Kingdom	Australia	
Men's individual tumbling	(United States) Rayshine Harris	(Russia) Daniel Avakian	(Poland) Tomasz Kies	
Women's individual tumbling	(United States) Amanda Lentz	(France) Mélanie Avisse	(France) Chrystel Robert	

2000

Event	Gold	Silver	Bronze	Ref.
Men's individual trampoline	(Russia) German Knychev	(Russia) Aleksandr Rusakov	(Germany) Henrik Stehlik	
Women's individual trampoline	(Russia) Irina Karavayeva	(Ukraine) Oksana Tsyguleva	(Germany) Anna Dogonadze	
Men's synchronized trampoline	Germany	United Kingdom	Canada	
Women's synchronized trampoline	Germany	Russia	Ukraine	
Men's individual tumbling	(France) Nicolas Fournials	(Russia) Levon Petrosian	(France) Nicolas Divry	
Women's individual tumbling	(United States) Amanda Lentz	(Russia) Yelena Bluzhina	(Russia) Natalya Rakhmanova	

2002

Event	Gold	Silver	Bronze	Ref.
Men's individual trampoline	(Russia) German Knychev	(France) David Martin	(Russia) Aleksandr Moskalenko	
Women's individual trampoline	(Russia) Irina Karavayeva	(Ukraine) Olena Movchan	(Russia) Natalya Chernova	
Men's synchronized trampoline	France	United Kingdom	Denmark	
Women's synchronized trampoline	Ukraine	United Kingdom	Belarus	
Men's individual tumbling	(France) Nicolas Fournials	(United Kingdom) Ross Gibson	(United States) Casey Finley	
Women's individual tumbling	(Russia) Anna Korobeynikova	(Ukraine) Olena Chabanenko	(United Kingdom) Kathryn Peberdy	

2004

Event	Gold	Silver	Bronze	Ref.
Men's individual trampoline	(Ukraine) Yuri Nikitin	(Russia) Aleksandr Rusakov	(Germany) Henrik Stehlik	
Women's individual trampoline	(Russia) Irina Karavayeva	(Ukraine) Olena Movchan	(Germany) Anna Dogonadze	
Men's synchronized trampoline	Japan	Germany	Ukraine	
Women's synchronized trampoline	Russia	Belarus	Germany	
Men's individual tumbling	(Belarus) Andrey Kabishev	(Russia) Aleksey Bantiyenko	(China) Pan Huanian	
Women's individual tumbling	(Russia) Anna Korobeynikova	(Ukraine) Olena Chabanenko	(United Kingdom) Kathryn Peberdy	

2006

Event	Gold	Silver	Bronze	Ref.
Men's individual trampoline	(Japan) Yasuhiro Ueyama	(Russia) Aleksandr Rusakov	(Japan) Tetsuya Sotomura	
Women's individual trampoline	(Canada) Karen Cockburn	(Germany) Anna Dogonadze	(United Kingdom) Clarire Wright	
Men's synchronized trampoline	Germany	Japan	Switzerland	
Women's synchronized trampoline	Canada	Germany	Ukraine	
Men's individual tumbling	(China) Wang Jiexu	(Russia) Tagir Murtazayev	(Poland) Jozef Wadecki	
Women's individual tumbling	(United Kingdom) Samantha Palmer	(Russia) Anna Korobeynikova	(Belarus) Ganna Tsiarenia	

2008

Event	Gold	Silver	Bronze	Ref.
Men's individual trampoline	(China) Dong Dong	(Ukraine) Yuri Nikitin	(Japan) Yasuhiro Ueyama	
Women's individual trampoline	(China) Huang Shanshan	(Ukraine) Olena Movchan	(Russia) Natalya Chernova	
Men's synchronized trampoline	Japan	Australia	Portugal	
Women's synchronized trampoline	Belarus	Russia	China	
Men's individual tumbling	(Russia) Andrey Krylov	(United States) Kalon Ludvigson	(Poland) Jozef Wadecki	
Women's individual tumbling	(Russia) Anna Korobeynikova	(Russia) Anastasiya Isupova	(Canada) Emily Smith	

==== 2022 ====
Event	Gold	Silver	Bronze	Ref.
Men's individual trampoline	(New Zealand) Dylan Schmidt	(France) Allan Morante	(Japan) Ishikawa Yamato	
Women's individual trampoline	(Japan) Mori Hikaru	(United Kingdom) Bryony Page	(China) Hu Yicheng	
Men's synchronized trampoline	Germany	Portugal	France	
Women's synchronized trampoline	Japan	France	Mexico	
