= Ivanovo-Voznesensk Polytechnic Institute =

- Иваново-Вознесенский политехнический институт
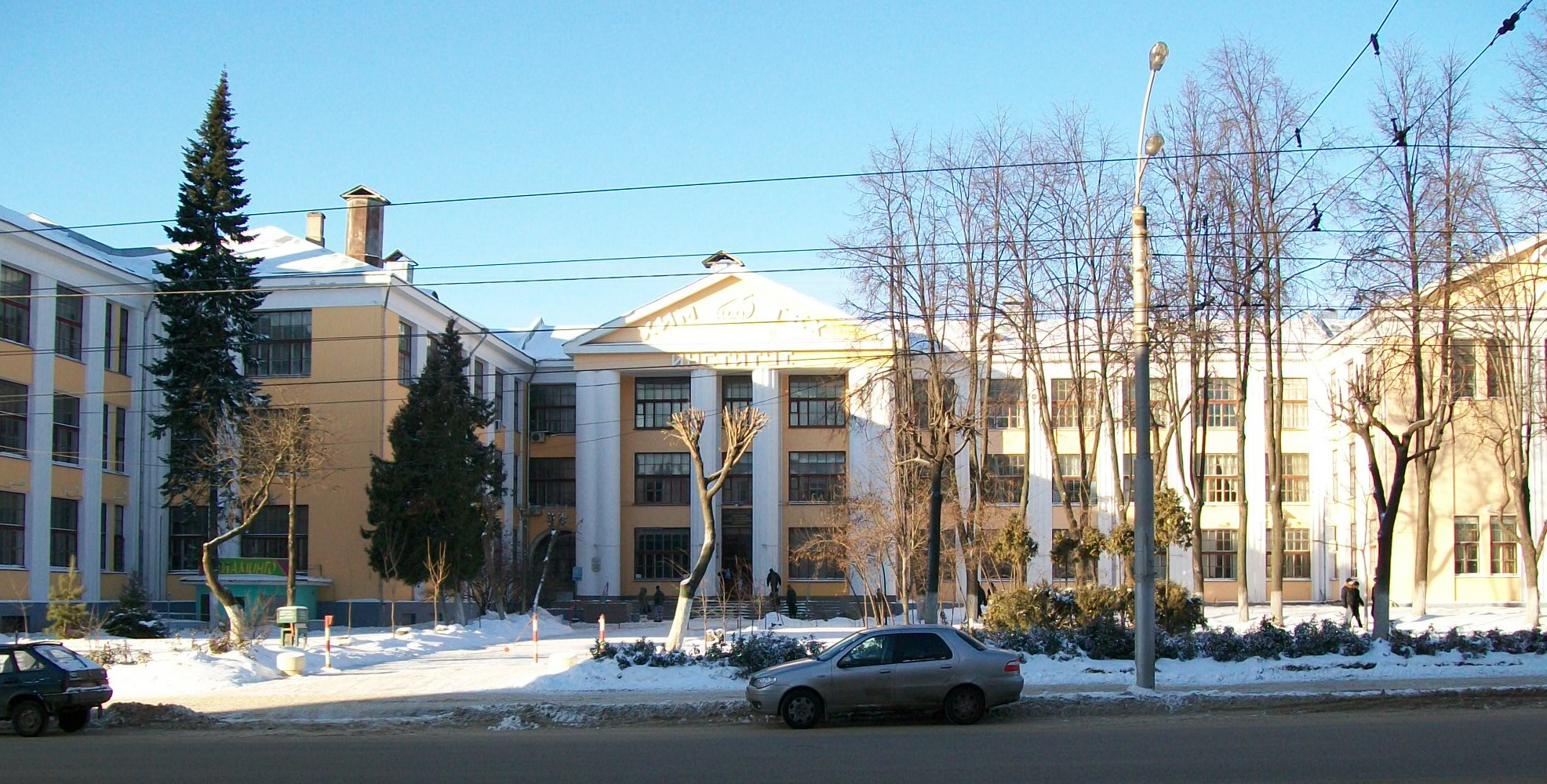
- The building of the Faculty of Chemistry of the IVPI (the main building of the IGCTU), a modern view
- Active: 1918–1930
- Location: Ivanovo, Russia
- Language: Russian
- Website: www.ispu.ru

Ivanovo-Voznesensk Polytechnic Institute (IVPI; Russian: Иваново-Вознесенский политехнический институт) was a higher-education institution in the city of Ivanovo-Voznesensk (present-day Ivanovo) in Russia. Established on the basis of the evacuated Riga Polytechnical Institute (Russian: Рижский политехнический институт), it operated from 1918 to 1930; in 1930 it was liquidated, and branch universities were set up on the basis of individual faculties.

The complex of buildings of the IVPI (Sheremetevsky Prospekt, 7) was built in 1928–1937 in the "proletarian classical" style (architect - Ivan Fomin) and included four buildings - the main building (1937), the Faculty of Chemistry (1930), working faculty (1934) and library (1931).

Currently, the Ivanovo State Polytechnic University (IvSPU; Russian: Ивановский государственный политехнический университет) and the Ivanovo State University of Chemistry and Technology (IGKhTU; Russian: Ивановский государственный химико-технологический университет) occupy the buildings of the former Ivanovo-Voznesensk Polytechnic Institute.

== History ==
The Ivanovo-Voznesensk Polytechnic Institute was founded on August 6, 1918, by a decree of Lenin on the basis of the Riga Technical University evacuated to Ivanovo-Voznesensk. Initially, the IVPI had six faculties: chemical, agricultural, socio-economic, engineering and construction, spinning and weaving faculties and the faculty of factory mechanics.

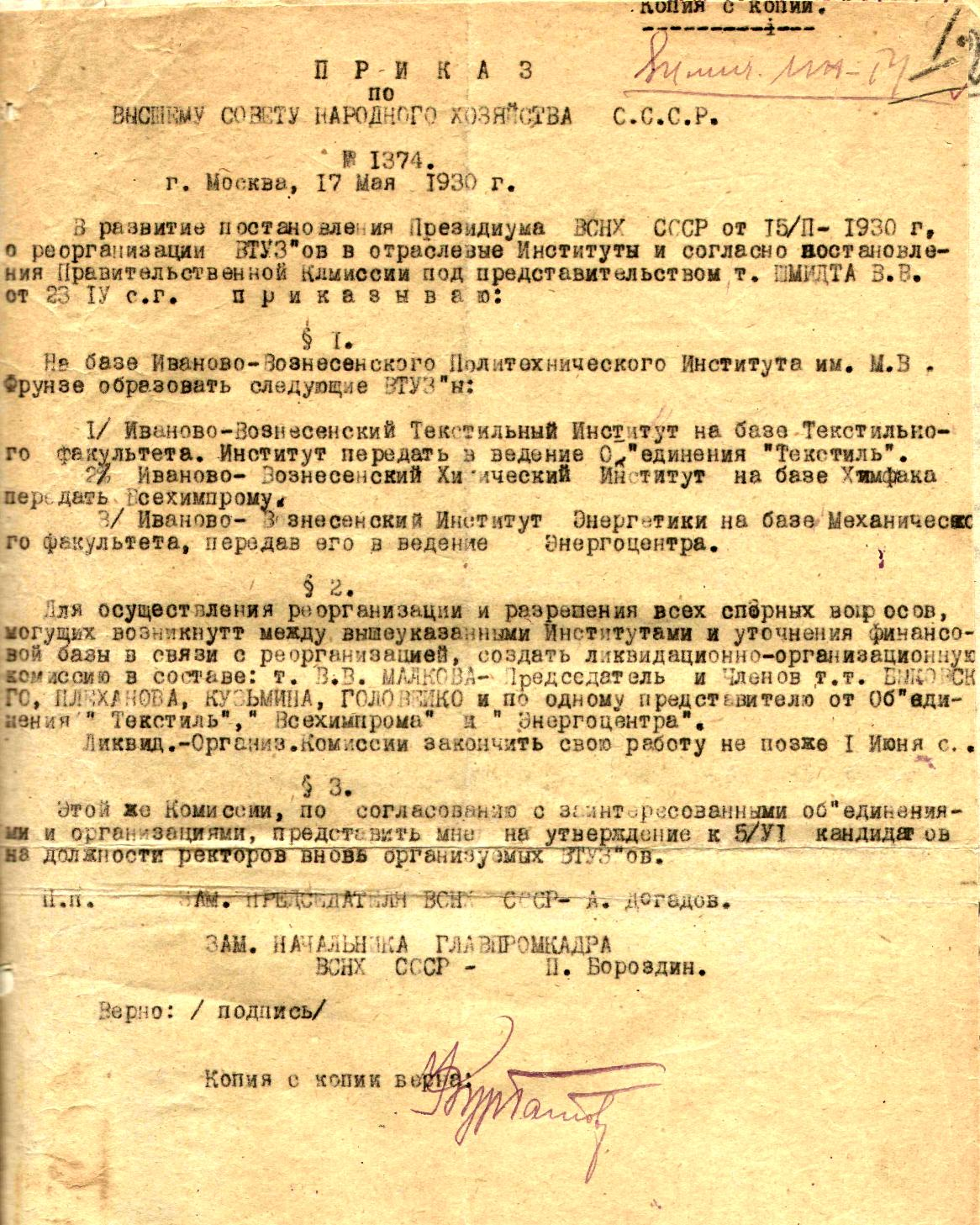
Order of the Supreme Council of National Economy of the USSR on the division of the Ivanovo-Voznesensk Polytechnic Institute into the Ivanovo-Voznesensk Textile Institute, the Ivanovo-Voznesensk Institute of Chemistry and the Ivanovo-Voznesensk Institute of Energy dated 17 May 1930

In 1930, the IVPI was liquidated and divided into separate institutes: on the basis of the Faculty of Chemistry, the Ivanovo Chemical-Technological Institute (IKhTI) was created, on the basis of the Spinning and Weaving Institute - the Ivanovo Textile Institute. M. V. Frunze (IvTI), on the basis of the Faculty of Agriculture - the Ivanovo Agricultural Institute (ISHI), on the basis of the Mechanical Engineering Faculty of the IVPI, the Ivanovo Power Engineering Institute (IEI) was formed.

=== Faculties ===
- Agronomic
- Engineering and Construction (closed in 1930)
- Forest (1921-1922)
- Spinning and weaving (in 1922 merged with mechanical engineering)
- Worker (since 1920)
- Socio-economic (closed in 1922)
- Textile (since 1927)
- Chemical
- Factory mechanics (since 1922 - mechanical engineering)

=== Rectors of the Institute ===
- 10.1918 - 09.1921 - Mikhail Nikolaevich Berlov
- 09.1921 - 10.1922 - Aleksandr Nekrasov
- 10.1922 - 1924 - Nikolai Nikolaevich Vorozhtsov
- 1924-1927 - Vyacheslav Vladimirovich Sushkov
- 1927 - 05.1930 - Vladimir Vladimirovich Malkov

== Architecture ==
In 1928 an all-Union competition was held for the development of a complex of educational buildings of the IVPI, which was won by the project of the academician of architecture Ivan Fomin, developed in the style of "proletarian classics". The buildings were erected during 1928–1937. To manage the construction and make working drawings, the design and construction bureau IVPI was organized, which was headed by the local architect A.I. Panov.

In general, the IVPI complex is a monumental project that occupies an area of several city blocks. According to the original plan of I. A. Fomin, four buildings of the institute were erected: the main building, the Faculty of Chemistry, the Faculty of Workers and the Library. The compositional axis of the architectural ensemble is Sheremetevsky Prospekt, which faces the main facades of all buildings. The facades use various combinations of single, double or triple columns and pilasters (smooth or fluted). I. A. Fomin, within the framework of his concept of “proletarian classics”, combines a classical portico, twin columns and simplified classical pilasters and pediments with large square constructivist windows with horizontal lintels.

=== Building of the Faculty of Chemistry (1930) ===
The building of the Faculty of Chemistry (Chemical-Technical Institute) is the most significant object of the complex. Four rectangular three-story buildings are located in ledges, parallel to each other, and united by a perpendicular fifth volume. The portico of the main entrance located in the back of the courtyard serves as the main compositional accent. The pediment of the portico is supported by six columns (double at the edges and two fluted in the middle). The tympanums of all the pediments are inscribed with relief symbols - a sickle and a hammer, and the abbreviated name of the institute. The walls between the large rectangular windows are designed as wide fluted pilasters.

Currently, the building houses the main building of the ISUHTU.

=== Main building (1937) ===
The main building consists of a series of interconnected three-story buildings. The composition is based on the alternation of rectangular window openings and fluted pilasters separating them. The center of the composition is the eight-column portico of the main entrance (with a pediment). The side columns are united by three on the flanks, the two central columns are fluted.

A strictly rational internal layout is based on a corridor system. In the front part there are: front vestibule, offices and auditoriums; four buildings at the back of the complex house a sports hall, library and laboratories.

Currently, the Textile Institute of the IVGPU is located in the main building of the IVPI.

=== Library building (1930) ===
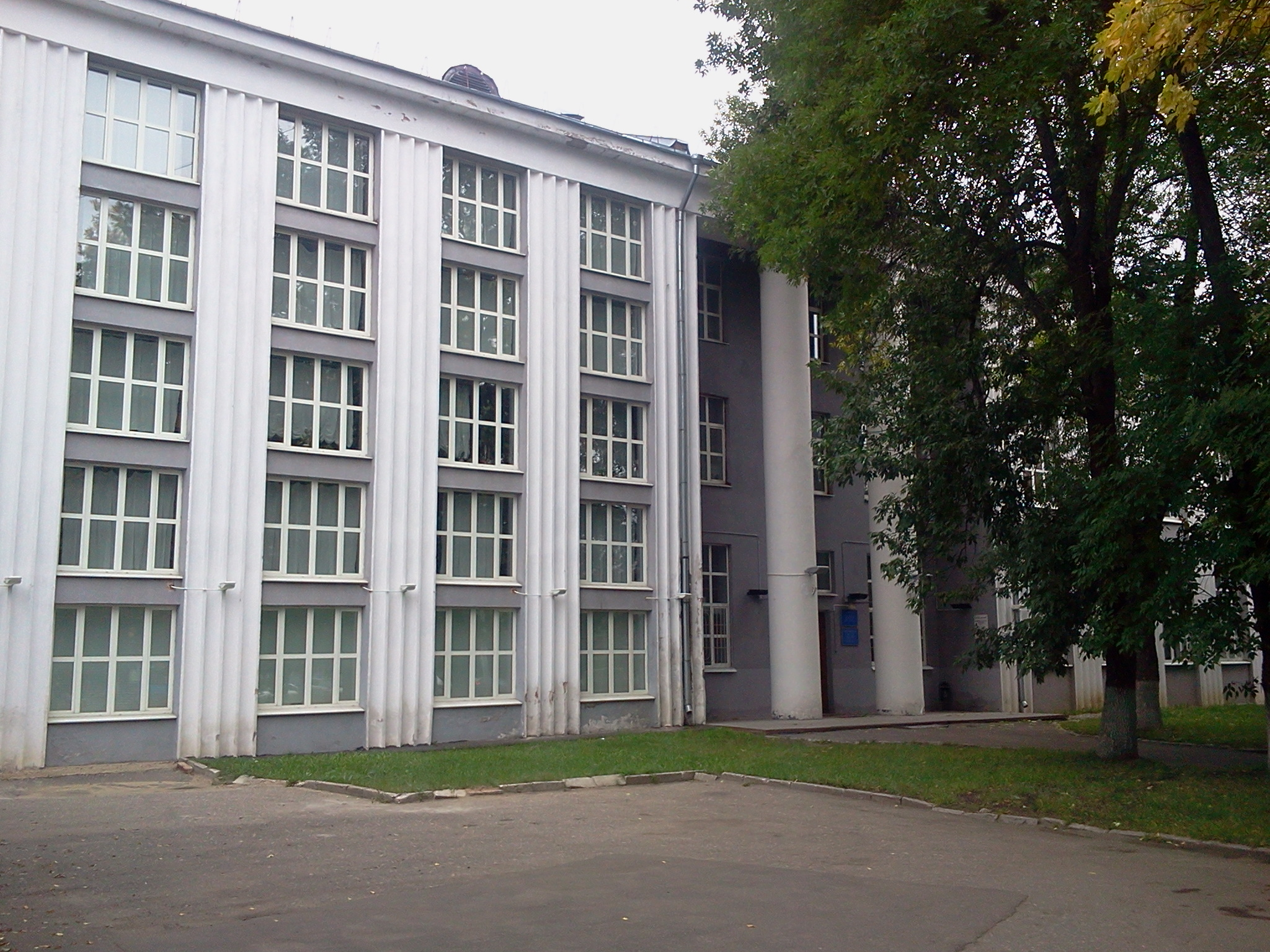
IVPI library building (Ivanovo Regional Scientific Library), modern view

The main extended facade of the library faces Sheremetevsky Prospekt. A smaller building of the same height adjoins the main rectangular volume of the building perpendicularly. In the center of the main facade is a two-columned portico. With the same height of the main building throughout its entire length, it has a different number of floors: the left part (book depository) is five-story, the right part (reading rooms) is two-story.

Currently, the building houses the Regional Scientific Library.

=== The building of the working faculty (1934) ===
The plan of the three-story building is close to L-shaped in shape, but is complicated by the ledge of the staircase on the left flank and the extension of the right end of the main extended volume towards the courtyard. The composition of the facades is based on the alternation of double columns, large windows and smooth plastered walls.

In the 1940s, the tower on the left flank of the building was liquidated.

In 1967, a gym was added from the side of the courtyard.

Currently, the building of the "workers' faculty" houses the classroom building of the ISUHTU.

== Literature ==
- Хан-Магомедов, Селим Омарович Иван Фомин. — М.: Shchusev Museum of Architecture; Фонд «Русский авангард», 2011. — 335 с. — ISBN 978-5-433-00019-3
- Свод памятников архитектуры и монументального искусства России: Ивановская область. Ч. 1. / Редкол.: Evgenia Kirichenko, Щеболева, Елена Геннадьевна (отв. ред.). — М.: Nauka, 1998. — 526 с. — ISBN 5-02-011278-X
- История края. Иваново: прошлое и настоящее: учебное пособие. — Иваново: Ивановская государственная сельскохозяйственная академия, 2011. — 299 с. — ISBN 978-5-98482-049-3
