= Aleksandr Rusakov =

Russian politician and former university rector

- Александр Русаков
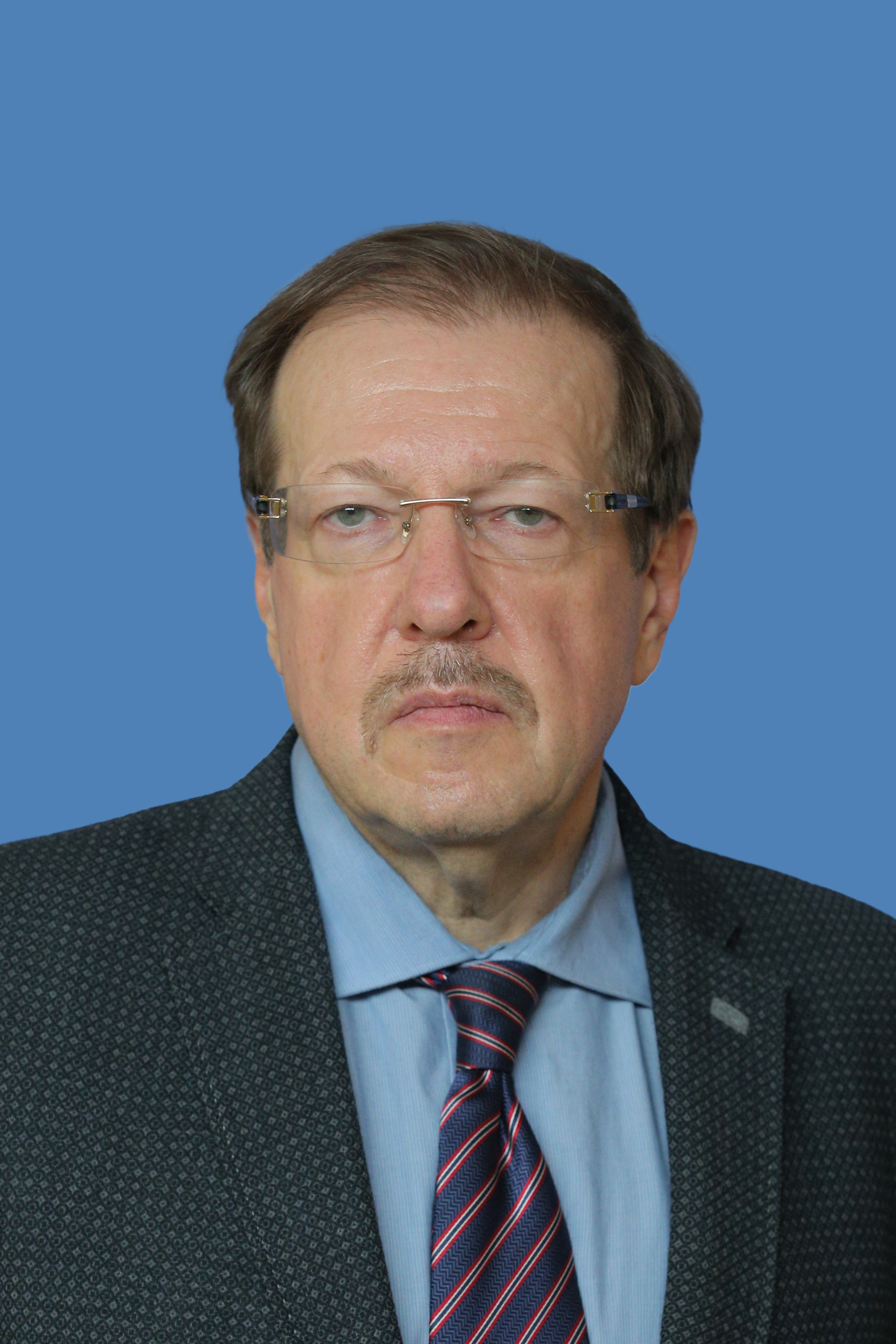

Senator from Yaroslavl Oblast
- Incumbent
- Assumed office 20 September 2022
- Preceded by: Sergei Beryozkin

Personal details
- Born: 30 September 1959 (age 67) Yaroslavl, RSFSR, Soviet Union
- Party: Independent
- Education: Leningrad State University; Ivanovo State University of Chemistry and Technology

Aleksandr Ilyich Rusakov (Russian: Александр Ильич Русаков; born September 30, 1959, Yaroslavl) is a Russian politician who is serving as senator of the Federation Council representing the executive branch of the Yaroslavl Oblast and a member of the Federation Council Committee on Science, Education, and Culture.

He served as rector of Yaroslavl State University from 2005 to 2022.

Due to the Russian invasion of Ukraine, he is subject to international sanctions from all EU countries and Switzerland.

== Biography ==
In 1981, he graduated from the Chemistry Department of the Leningrad State University, specializing in Quantum Chemistry. He worked at the Yaroslavl State Polytechnic Institute as an engineer, senior researcher, and head of the interdepartmental nuclear magnetic resonance laboratory. He also worked at the Yarsintez Scientific Production Association as a senior researcher.

In 1987, he defended his PhD dissertation at the N. D. Zelinsky Institute of Organic Chemistry of the Soviet Academy of Sciences. In 2005, he defended his doctoral dissertation at the Ivanovo State University of Chemistry and Technology (Doctor of Chemical Sciences).

Since 1994, he has worked at Yaroslavl State University: chief specialist of the information and computing center, director of the Internet center, and since August 1997, vice-rector for information technology; from 2000 to 2005, first vice-rector; and from 2005 to 2022, rector. He is deputy chairman of the Council of Rectors of Universities of the Yaroslavl Oblast.

He is also involved in socio-political activities: he actively participates in the Yaroslavl regional branch of the All-Russia People's Front and has repeatedly served as a confidant of Russian President Vladimir Putin. In 2013, he ran for deputy of the Yaroslavl Oblast Duma on the United Russia party list, but was not elected. He served in the Public Chamber of the Yaroslavl Oblast and the Public Chamber of the Russian Federation, where he was nominated by the Governor of the Yaroslavl Oblast, Sergey Yastrebov.

Since 2022, he has been a senator from the Yaroslavl Oblast, replacing Sergei Beryozkin in this position.
