= Ivanovo State Power Engineering University =

University in Ivanovo, Russia

Ivanovo State Power University
- Ивановский государственный энергетический университет
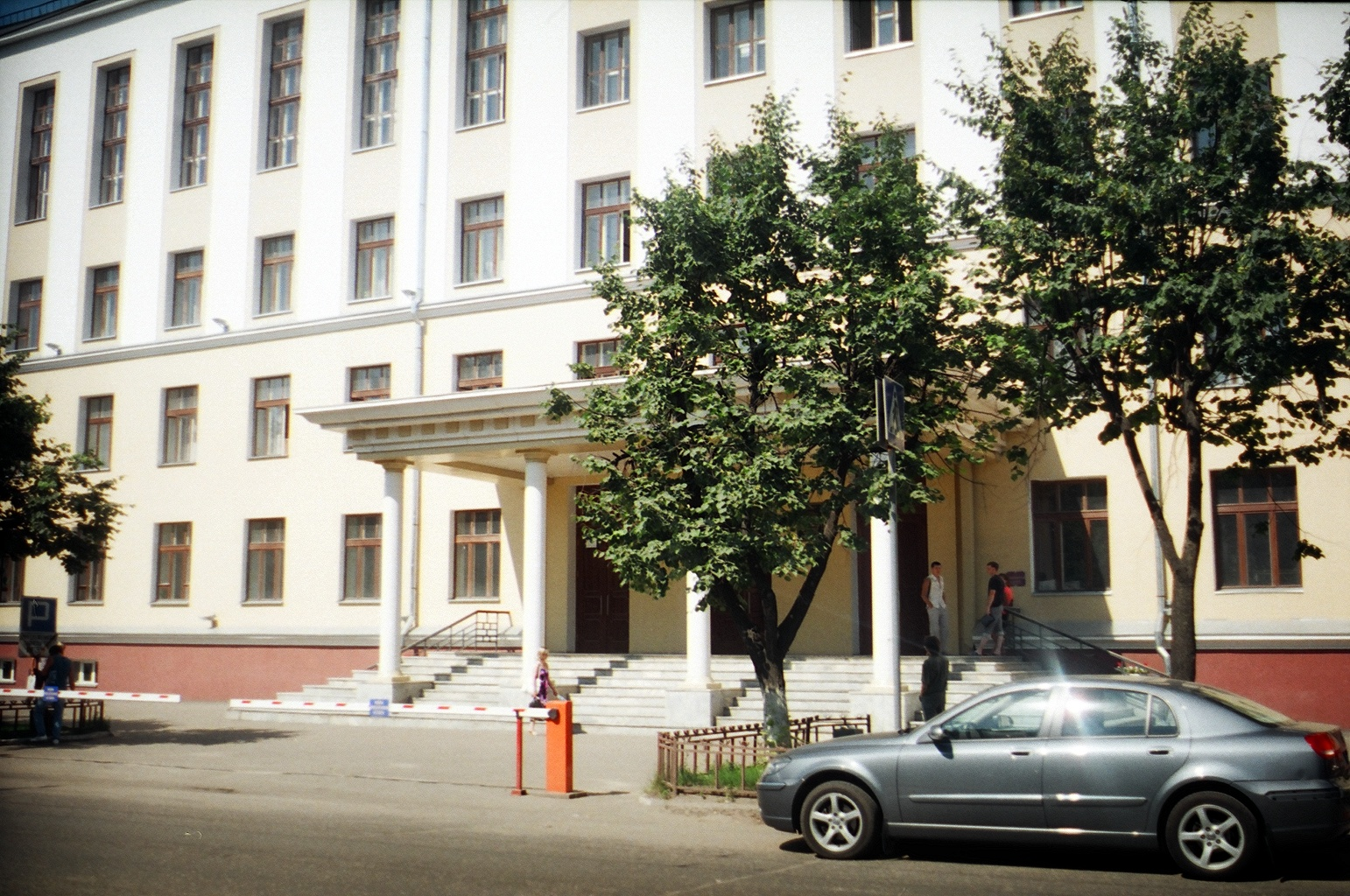
- View of the main building
- Established: 1930
- Students: 7310
- Doctoral students: 136
- Location: Ivanovo, Russia; 57.00128°N 40.94252°E
- Language: Russian
- Website: www.ispu.ru

University rankings

Regional – Overall
- QS Emerging Europe and Central Asia: 351-400 (2022)

Ivanovo State Power University (Russian: Ивановский государственный энергетический университет) is a higher education institution in the city of Ivanovo, founded on 24 June 1930 on the basis of the mechanical engineering faculty of the Ivanovo-Voznesensk Polytechnic Institute. Until 1992, it was called the Ivanovo Power Engineering Institute. V. I. Lenin.

== History ==
Ivanovo State Power Engineering University was founded on the basis of the Mechanical Engineering Faculty of the Ivanovo-Voznesensky Polytechnic Institute in 1930 and until 1992 was called the Ivanovo Power Engineering Institute. P. I. Plekhanov was the rector of the institute.

=== In the USSR ===
The Ivanovo-Voznesensk Polytechnic Institute was established in 1918 on the basis of the Riga Technical University evacuated to Ivanovo.

In 1931 Ya. F. Kedrov was appointed rector of the institute. At the same time, construction began on building "A" in the first Workers' settlement. In 1932, the institute came under the jurisdiction of the People's Commissariat of Heavy Industry of the USSR. In 1933, the Faculty of Electrical Engineering and Thermal engineering were founded, and F. E. Okhotnikov was appointed rector.

In 1934, the evening department of the institute was closed, and in 1935 the general technical faculty was opened. PS Borodynya was appointed Rector of the institute. By 1936, the teaching staff of the institute had doubled, and the number of students had grown by a third.

In 1937, the institute was headed by N.L. Spektor, he passed into the jurisdiction of the People's Commissariat of the Defense Industry. The structure of the institute was reorganized – the general technical faculty was closed, the heat engineering specialty was abolished, postgraduate studies were restored and a new specialty was introduced – "Power supply of industrial enterprises", the training lasted five years and two months.

In 1938, the institute was headed by A.N. Zverev, in the same year the Ivanovo Energy Institute celebrated its twentieth anniversary, in connection with which it was named after V.I. Lenin.

In January 1939, the institute was transferred to the People's Commissariat for the Shipbuilding Industry, and in the summer of the same year it was transferred to the People's Commissariat of Power Plants and the Electrical Industry. In 1939, G. K. Filonenko defended his first doctoral dissertation.

In 1941, F. I. Isaev was appointed rector of the institute, at the same time the construction of student dormitory No. 1 for 350 people was completed, and the training of students in the specialty "thermal power engineering" began again. At the beginning of the war, 330 teachers and students went to the front, hospitals were placed in half of the academic building and student dormitories, classes were held in two shifts, and the training period was reduced to three years and four months.

After the Great Patriotic War, with the development of the Soviet nuclear project, the Ivanovo Institute became the leading educational institution for training personnel for nuclear power plants under construction and operational personnel for the operation of nuclear power plants.

=== In Russian federation ===
In 1992, the Ivanovo Power Engineering Institute was given the status of a state technical university.

In 1993, the work of the Russian-German seminar "Reliability of energy systems" began.

In 1994, Ivanovo State Power Engineering University received a grant to conduct educational exchanges from the United States of America News Agency.

In 1997, a doctoral program was opened in the specialties "Electrical complexes and systems, including their control and regulation", "Automation of technological processes and production", "Computer-aided design systems".

In 2000, on the basis of the Ivanovo Machine-Building College (IvMT), the Machine-Building College of the Ivanovo State Power Engineering University was formed. In 2001, the faculty of advanced training of teachers was opened, the development of the university is in accordance with the principles of education quality management.

In 2005, a full-scale simulator of the power unit was donated to the Ivanovo State Power Engineering University by the Kalinin Nuclear Power Plant, and an interfaculty training center was founded. Thanks to this, the structure of training specialists for the nuclear power industry at ISPU is consistent with the requirements for training operational personnel at nuclear power plants, and the training program is adapted to the training programs for VIUR, VIUT and complies with the requirements of NPP guidelines.

In 2007, a military training center was opened at the university to train officers of the signal troops serving under a contract.

== Ratings ==
In 2014, the Expert RA agency included the university in the list of the best higher educational institutions of the Commonwealth of Independent States, where it was assigned the E rating class.

== Faculties and departments ==
=== TEF – Faculty of Thermal Power Engineering ===
The faculty was founded in 1948.

- Department of Automation of Technological Processes
- Department of Chemistry and Chemical Technologies in Energy
- Department of Thermal Power Plants
- Department of Steam and Gas Turbines
- Department of Theoretical Foundations of Heat Engineering
- Department of Industrial Heat Power Engineering
- Educational and Scientific Center for Simulators in Energy (UNCT)

=== EMF – Faculty of Electromechanics ===
The faculty was founded in 1956.

- Department of Electronics and Microprocessor Systems
- Department of Mechanical Engineering Technology
- Department of Electric Drive and Automation of Industrial Installations
- Department of Electromechanics
- Department of Theoretical and Applied Mechanics
- Department of Applied Mathematics

=== EEF – Faculty of Electrical Power Engineering ===
The faculty was founded in 1956.

- Department of Power Plants, Substations and Diagnostics of Electrical Equipment
- Department of Electrical Systems
- Department of automatic control of electric power systems
- Department of Theoretical Foundations of Electrical Engineering and Electrotechnology
- Department of High-Voltage Power Engineering, Electrical Engineering and Electrophysics

=== IVTF – Faculty of Informatics and Computer Engineering ===
The faculty was founded in 1991.

- Department of Control Systems
- Department of Computer Systems Software
- Department of Information Technology
- Department of Higher Mathematics
- Department of High-Performance Computing Systems
- Department of Intensive English Studies
- Department of Design and Graphics

=== IFF – Faculty of Engineering and Physics ===
The faculty was founded in 1991.

- Department of Nuclear Power Plants
- Department of Energy, Heat Technologies and Gas Supply
- Department of Physics
- Department of Life Safety
- Department of French

=== FEU – Faculty of Economics and Management ===
The faculty was founded in 1991.

- Department of General Economic Theory
- Department of Economics and Enterprise Organization
- Department of Management and Marketing
- Department of Public Relations, Political Science, Psychology and Law
- Department of Sociology
- Department of National History and Culture
- Department of Philosophy
- Department of Foreign Languages
- Department of Physical Education
- Center for Economics and Finance
- Training Center "Management in Energy"

The university also has a military department and a military training center.

== Links ==
- Official website (in Russian)
