= Wonder Seven =

1994 Hong Kong film by Ching Siu-tung

- Film poster
- Traditional Chinese: 7金剛
- Hanyu Pinyin: 7 Jīngāng
- Directed by: Ching Siu-tung
- Screenplay by: Elsa Tang Bik-Yin; Charcoal Tan; Ching Siu-tung
- Story by: Manfred Wong Man-Chun
- Produced by: Catherine Hun
- Starring: Michelle Yeoh; Li Ning
- Cinematography: Poon Hang-Sang; Peter Ngor
- Edited by: Poon Hung
- Music by: Lowell Lo
- Production company: China Entertainment Films Production Ltd.
- Release date: 1 April 1994; (Hong Kong)
- Running time: 90 minutes
- Country: Hong Kong
- Language: Cantonese
- Box office: HK$117,857

Wonder Seven (Chinese: 7金剛; pinyin: 7 Jīngāng) is a 1994 Cantonese-language Hong Kong action film directed by Ching Siu-tung.

== Plot ==
Armed robbers rob six gambling houses in 13 minutes, then run across the border to avoid arrest. The Special Forces Squad, a seven-member secret group of well-trained Hong Kong government agents, chases after them on motorbikes and ties them up for the authorities to find.

The Chief introduces the Special Forces Squad to Colonel Yim, a colonel of the Southwestern Army. Yim tells them that Major Yeung of the Southwestern Army is plotting with US ammunition suppliers and selling arms to terrorists. The team plans to stop his upcoming deal, arrest Yeung and his group's bank cards so that they can open a safe deposit box at a Swiss bank containing $120,000,000 in diamonds belonging to the Chinese. Team member Fei meets a woman and flirts with her.

The team spots Young at an arts festival and see that he is pairing bank cards with the woman Fei met. Her partner Tsun then fatally stabs Yeung. Fei grabs Yeung's bank card and takes it with him. Afterwards, Tsun tells Ying, the woman that Fei met, that their boss Sun told him to do it so that they could take Yeung's share, then he makes Ying give him her bank card. Ying then meets with Fei and promises to share the diamonds with him if he gives her the bank card that he seized.

Team member Dragon and the chief visit a theatre that the team wants to turn into a restaurant, but someone waiting for them fatally shoots the chief. Fei rushes in an accidentally shoots Dragon. Sergeant Cheung wants to arrest the team, but an agent of the Hong Kong government and members of the Chinese Security Bureau tell Cheung to release them, close the case and hand over the evidence to the Chinese. Fei obediently surrenders to arrest, but his friends use explosives to free him from the transport container despite his objections. Tsun and the gang kill nurses and security guards and try to abduct Dragon from the hospital, but Dragon's teammates arrive and take him to safety at a Buddhist monastery.

The Chinese security bureau blows up the team's houseboat. At a golf course, Fei meets with Ying, who pretends to fight him, then helps him escape into the woods, where the team's Coach, the head of the Chinese security bureau, agrees to give him time to solve the case. Dragon wakes up and tells them that he hid the card in the lining of seat 53 in row H of the theatre when he was being attacked. A monk at the monastery reveals their location to Colonel Yim, who is working with Tsun. Sun tries to kick Tsun out of the gang, but Tsun kills Sun and takes over the gang. Tsun kills Superman in a gang fight on motorbikes, and the team incinerates his corpse.

Tsun introduces Ying to his business partner, Colonel Yim. Ying finds the team's hideout in the monastery and is told by team member Little Archer to look for Fei in Kau To Shan. Ying finds Fei and tells him that Colonel Yim is a spy working for Tsun. The team leaves for a new hideout. Tsun arrives at the monastery but finds that the team has left, so he shoots the monk.

Ying joins the team, and together they attack Tsun and his gang in a high-rise building. Coach and his men join in, then Coach begins fighting Fei for control of the bank card while they are hanging from a gondola lift. Tsun takes the bank card from Fei, giving him control of both cards, then escapes in a helicopter with Ying as his captive. Fei is caught in a falling elevator, but Coach throws an explosive into the shaft, propelling the elevator cab into the sky, where it hits the helicopter, causing it to fall and get caught on the edge of the building. As Tsun dies, he gives both bank cards to Ying. Ying and Fei escape across an I-beam onto the roof of the building as the helicopter falls to the ground.

The team gives Ying an invitation to their future restaurant. She says that she will come when she has settled her business in the U.S., then gives the bank cards to Fei.

== Cast ==
- Michelle Yeoh as Fong Ying
- Li Ning as Yip Fei
- Kent Cheng Jak-Si as Nanny
- Roger Kwok Chun-On as Steelbar
- Andy Hui Chi-On as Superman
- Xiong Xinxin as Shaolin Monk
- Hilary Tsui Ho-Ying as Tiny Archer
- Vincent Lau Tak as Dragon
- Chin Ho (秦豪) as Chun Ho
- Elvis Tsui Kam-Kong as Coach of Wonder Seven
- Guan Shan as Chief of Wonder Seven
- Wong Kam-Kong as Colonel Yim Tung
- Bob Lam Chung-Kwok
- O Sing-Pui as Bomb expert
- Lee Diy-Yue as HK Political's officer
- Jimmy Wong Wa-Wo as Blind man at dragon dance
- Kan Yee-Ching as PRC official
- Pan Yung-Sheng as Robber in opening scene
- Kong Fu-Keung as Robber
- Sam Ho Choi-Chow as Robber
- Kong Miu-Deng as Robber
- Bobby Yip as Robber
- Mak Wai-Cheung as Robber
- Gary Mak as Chun Ho's thug
- Jacky Cheung Chun-Hung (張浚鴻) as Chun Ho's thug
- Wong Chi-Keung (黃志強) as Chun Ho's thug
- Joe Cheng Cho as Chun Ho's thug
- Sam Kin-Sang as Policeman
- Wong Chung-Kui as Chinese security bureau member
- So Wai-Nam as Extra
- Adam Chan Chung-Tai as Extra
- Lee Tat-Chiu as Extra
- Sammy Fan Chin-Hung as Extra
- Kwan Yung as Extra
- Lui Siu-Ming as Extra
- Lau Tze-Ming as Extra
- Do-Yu Lee

== Reception ==
The review on chrichtonsworld.com reads, "Tonally the film is all over the place. Lot's [sic] of comedy and lightheartedness intertwined with death, chaos and betrayal. Super baddie was very aware he was in a bad film and hams it up big time which makes me think this film was meant for kids. It's the only explanation that makes sense. Still doesn't explain why it deals with certain adult themes but I guess they were optimistic or convinced could handle all what it is throwing at them. Overall, you aren't supposed to take this film seriously. Just focus on the action sequences and you will have a good time especially if you are watching it for the first time. Just don't expect too much."

Reviewer Kozo of lovehkfilm.com wrote, "Some nifty action sequences highlight the flick, including a visually cool sequence at a dragon parade. Sadly, the rest of the film is over-the-top strange, with some silly action and even sillier character interplay. The Wonder Seven spend a lot of time on lame hijinks, and prove to be far from interesting people. They all conform to various types [...], but that isn't enough to make them viable characters. Male lead Li Ning has the screen presence of a brick, and bad guy Chin Ho adds to his increasingly limited repitoire [sic] of over-the-top baddies. Michelle Yeoh dominates the screen when she's on it, but the rest of the film could have used some help, especially from someone who can actually write. The plot of the film makes not a lick of sense, and proves far from engaging. And the climax of the film doesn't even relieve any narrative tension, because there is none! The overall effect is numbing. Wonder Seven just sort of goes forward until it ends, and whether or not you ultimately care is entirely up to you."

Reviewer Jeff Vice of Deseret News wrote, "Very few Hong Kong action films are going to win awards for realism. In fact, many of them feature such ludicrous plots that they make even fellow star Jackie Chan's comic thrillers look like documentaries. But there are some of these films that stretch credibility so far it snaps. And for every one of them that succeeds in spite of its silliness (such as the movies in director Tsui Hark's 'Once Upon a Time in China' series), there's an equally inane ones like 'Wonder Seven.' This at-times-exciting, but-more-often-preposterous action-thriller mistakenly pairs China's biggest female action star, Michelle Yeoh, with former Olympic gymnast Li Ning. Though it's interesting to see Yeoh play a villain for a change, it obviously doesn't last for long. Also, an unfortunate injury during filming kept Yeoh out of much of the action, and consequently, director Ching Siu Tung was forced to give the dexterous but unexciting Ning the bulk of the fight scenes."

Reviewer Paul Bramhall of cityonfire.com gave the film a rating of 6 out of 10, writing, "It almost feels as if Siu-Tung watched the final cut of Wonder Seven and perhaps said to himself, “This really stretches believability doesn't it?” As while he’d stick with the contemporary setting for his next outing, Dr Wai in the Scripture With No Words, he opted for the Operation Scorpio approach and framed the action within the context of a novelist visualising their latest story. While this approach may have allowed for even wilder action scenes, personally I enjoyed watching the over-the-top aesthetic of a new wave wuxia being imposed on a modern day actioner. Just change reams of silk for the fumes of an exhaust, and an all powerful weapon with a skyscraper rigged to explode, and you should be in for a good time."

Reviewer Andrew Skeates of fareastfilms.com gave the film a rating of 3 out of 5 stars, writing, "Crazy action high-jinks abound in the silly, dated but admittedly (for the most part) fun ‘Wonder Seven’. The wondrous seven are a group of motorcycle-riding do-gooders who ride around Hong Kong saving the day. [...] Plot is fairly thin on the ground here and what there is doesn’t always make a lot of sense as this flick is basically a showcase for some silly shenanigans from the main cast and a platform for Ching Siu-Tung to stage some impressive and crazy action. [...] Comic book in tone with lots of high flying wirework the action is certainly over-the-top but always creative and energetic. Highlights include the opening salvo of the Wonder 7 completing their previous mission with lots of motorcycle stunts, a neat sequence involving a dragon parade and the crazy stunt filled finale featuring a helicopter and a skyscraper! Alas, the rest of the film isn’t as fun as the action. Too much silly tomfoolery from the crew clogs up proceedings and grates after a while (and seems to involve every character falling into the sea at some point!), the supposed romance between Yeoh and Ning is flat rather than fiery and the rest of the Wonder 7 (including the likes of Andy Hui, Hilary Tsui and Xiong Xin-Xin) never really get a chance to shine. Ching Siu-Tung and Michelle Yeoh have certainly made better films but whenever the latter is on screen things improve greatly and while it’s no great shakes (and gets an extra star for the stylish action and presence of Yeoh) 'Wonder Seven' will provide some nostalgia tinged enjoyment for those who miss the golden days of stunt filled Hong Kong action cinema."

Reviewer Marc Savlov of The Austin Chronicle wrote, "Ching, who directed parts two and three of the Swordsman trilogy and produced all three Chinese Ghost Story films, does an abrupt about-face with this above-average Hong Kong actioner that relies more heavily on trillions of bullets than it does on balletic, flying fist fights. There are balletic fist fights galore, to be sure, but Ching is mining more Woo territory than that of former partner Tsui Hark. With a rapid-fire, convoluted plot likely to leave even the most die-hard Hong Kong film fans scratching their heads in bewilderment, Wonder Seven is best appreciated for its reckless, wild, way-over-the-top action than anything else… but what else is new, huh?"

Reviewer Simon of the14amazons.co.uk gave the film a rating of 2.5 out of 5 stars, writing, "Considering that it was made in 1994, well after some of Ching Siu-Tung's most impressive work, this film feels surprisingly amateurish and also oddly dated. For some reason I thought it was made in 1987 for most of this rewatch... possibly just because it looks, feels and sounds exactly like it had been made in 1987. Apart from anything else there is the weird fetish for that bane of 1980's action movies, the dirt bike. So many directors have been tempted by the combination of dirt bike and shootout, and so many have learnt the hard way that it is a ridiculous combination. To be fair, even Hard Boiled made this error in 1992, but by 1994 surely everybody except Ching Siu-Tung had realised it was a bad idea? The action scenes generally seem a bit disjointed, often favouring capturing characters in cool poses (in slow motion if possible) over continuity. I guess this is perhaps true of Ching Siu-Tung's work more than most - especially when he hasn't got another director around to inject a bit of discipline."

Reviewer Vince Leo of qwipster.com gave the film a rating of 3.5 out of 5 stars, writing, "Director Stanley Tong is a hard man to figure out based on his track record thus far. For every good film (Swordman II [sic], A Chinese Ghost Story, Royal Tramp) he seems to follow up with a bad one (Heroic Trio, Royal Tramp II, Executioners). Happily, Wonder Seven is one of the good ones, with breathtaking stunts and a good dose of humor. The plot is a bit convoluted, and some of the directing lifts from John Woo's bag, but the film is undeniably entertaining in its own over-the-top style. Fans of Hong Kong action (and of Yeoh (Wing Chun) in particular) should check this one out."

A review on asianfilmstrike.com gave the film a rating of 1.5 stars. The review reads, "Inanely plotted and never salvaged by Ching Siu Tung’s action style at its most overwrought, Wonder Seven does have a stylishly-filmed Michelle Yeoh in its cast, and that's it."

A review on hkfilm.net gave the film a rating of 5 out of 10. The review reads, "Wonder Seven has some problems going for it, most notably the size of the cast. [...] As could be expected from Ching Siu-Tung, the action scenes in Wonder Seven are well-done. But they are a bit unbelievable -- even in the wacky world of HK action films. One scene has an explosion sending an elevator shooting up a shaft, through the roof and into a helicopter. Some of the battles occur on motorcycles and the team has a somewhat silly way of calling out their moves on the bikes, much like people did in old-school kung fu movies. Thankfully, most of the kung fu and gun fighting is a little less exaggerated. I enjoy wire-fu, but with so many talented martial artists (several of the cast members were national champions in various forms of kung fu) in the film, it would seem a shame to overuse wires. Michelle Yeoh -- as could be expected -- shines in these fights and throughout her (too few) appearances in the film; with glamorous clothes and omnipresent sunglasses, she manages to give this film a bit of much-needed class. If you're a fan of hers, then give Wonder Seven a try. Though it really isn't 'her' film, she does provide the glue which manages to hold this somewhat haphazard movie together." "
