= Aleksandr Nekrasov =

Russian mathematician (1883–1957)

- Born: Aleksandr Ivanovich Nekrasov; December 9, 1883; Moscow, Russian Empire
- Died: May 21, 1957 (aged 73); Moscow, Soviet Union
- Education: University of Moscow
- Awards: Order of Lenin; Order of the Red Banner of Labour; Stalin Prize
- Scientific career
- Fields: Mathematics, physics
- Workplaces: University of Moscow; Sergo Orjonikidze Aviation Institute; Academy of Sciences of the Soviet Union

Aleksandr Ivanovich Nekrasov (Russian: Алекса́ндр Ива́нович Некра́сов; 9 December [O.S. 27 November] 1883 – 21 May 1957) was a Soviet and Russian mathematician known for his mathematical contributions to hydromechanics and aeromechanics. The Nekrasov integral equation describing surface waves is named for him.

== Biography ==
Nekrasov was born in Moscow, Russian Empire where he would remain for the rest of his life. He went to school and graduated from the University of Moscow in 1906. Nekrasov graduated with a first class diploma.

Nekrasov earned a gold medal for work of his essay, Theory of the Satellites of Jupiter.
