= Li Ning =

Chinese gymnast (born 1963)

- Lij Ningz
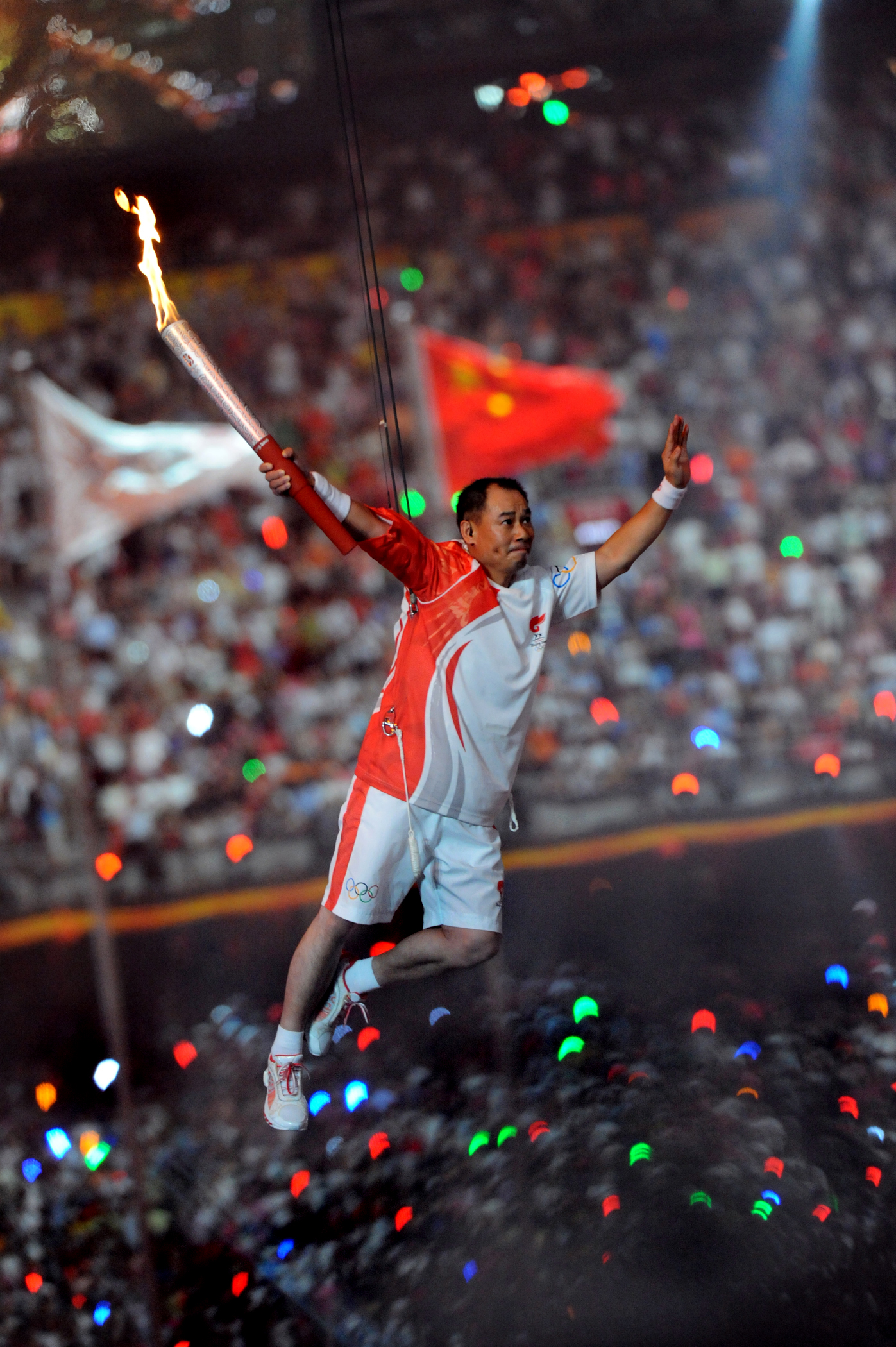
- Li lighting the torch at the 2008 Summer Olympics

Personal information
- Nickname: Prince of gymnastics
- Born: March 10, 1963 (age 63) Liuzhou, Guangxi, China
- Height: 1.64 m (5 ft 5 in)
- Spouse: Chen Yongyan

Gymnastics career
- Discipline: Men's artistic gymnastics
- Country represented: China
- Head coach: Zhang Jian
- Retired: 1988
Medal record
Representing China
Olympic Games
Gold medal – first place	1984 Los Angeles	Floor
Gold medal – first place	1984 Los Angeles	Pommel Horse
Gold medal – first place	1984 Los Angeles	Rings
Silver medal – second place	1984 Los Angeles	Team
Silver medal – second place	1984 Los Angeles	Vault
Bronze medal – third place	1984 Los Angeles	All-Around
World Championships
Gold medal – first place	1983 Budapest	Team all-around
Gold medal – first place	1985 Montreal	Rings
Silver medal – second place	1983 Budapest	Vault
Silver medal – second place	1985 Montreal	Team all-around
Silver medal – second place	1985 Montreal	Pommel horse
Silver medal – second place	1987 Rotterdam	Rings
Silver medal – second place	1987 Rotterdam	Team all-around
Bronze medal – third place	1981 Moscow	Team all-around
Bronze medal – third place	1983 Budapest	Rings
Bronze medal – third place	1983 Budapest	Floor
Bronze medal – third place	1985 Montreal	Floor
World Cup
Gold medal – first place	1982 Zagreb	All-Around
Gold medal – first place	1982 Zagreb	Floor
Gold medal – first place	1982 Zagreb	Pommel Horse
Gold medal – first place	1982 Zagreb	Rings
Gold medal – first place	1982 Zagreb	Vault
Gold medal – first place	1982 Zagreb	Horizontal Bar
Bronze medal – third place	1982 Zagreb	Parallel Bars
Gold medal – first place	1986 Beijing	All-Around
Gold medal – first place	1986 Beijing	Floor Exercise
Gold medal – first place	1986 Beijing	Pommel Horse
Bronze medal – third place	1986 Beijing	Rings
Asian Games
Gold medal – first place	1982 New Delhi	Team
Gold medal – first place	1982 New Delhi	All-Around
Gold medal – first place	1982 New Delhi	Pommel Horse
Gold medal – first place	1982 New Delhi	Rings
Gold medal – first place	1986 Seoul	Team
Gold medal – first place	1986 Seoul	All-Around
Gold medal – first place	1986 Seoul	Floor Exercise
Gold medal – first place	1986 Seoul	Rings
Silver medal – second place	1982 New Delhi	Parallel Bars
Silver medal – second place	1986 Seoul	Pommel Horse
Silver medal – second place	1986 Seoul	Horizontal Bar

Li Ning
- Simplified Chinese: 李宁
- Traditional Chinese: 李寧
Transcriptions
Standard Mandarin
- Hanyu Pinyin: Lǐ Níng

Li Ning (Chinese: 李宁; Zhuang: Lij Ningz; born March 10, 1963, in Liuzhou, Guangxi) is a Chinese billionaire entrepreneur, the founder of the eponymous sportswear company Li-Ning, and a retired Olympic gold medal-winning gymnast of Zhuang ethnicity. He lives in Hong Kong.

== Gymnastics career ==
Li started training when he was eight and was selected for the national team in 1980. In 1982, he won six of the seven medals awarded at the Sixth World Cup Gymnastic Competition, earning him the title "Prince of Gymnastics" (simplified Chinese: 体操王子; traditional Chinese: 體操王子).

Li is most famous for winning six medals at the 1984 Summer Olympics, the first Olympics in which the People's Republic of China participated. He won three gold medals (in floor exercise, pommel horse, and rings), two silver medals, and one bronze medal. Li became the most decorated Chinese athlete at the first Olympics that China participated in after the founding of the People's Republic in October 1949.

Li won 11 World Artistic Gymnastics Championships medals, including gold medals in the rings (1985) and team all-around (1983).

Li took part in his second Olympics at the 1988 Summer Olympics in Seoul, despite carrying injuries. It ended an illustrious gymnastic career, as he was off-form.

== Post-gymnastics career ==
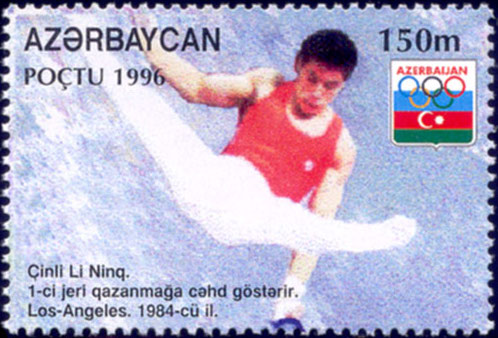
Li on a 1996 Azerbaijani stamp

Li retired from sporting competition in 1988, and in 1990 he founded Li-Ning Company Limited, which sells footwear and sporting apparel in China. Li remains chairman of the company's board of directors. According to Hurun Report's China Rich List 2014, he has an estimated fortune of RMB 5 billion, making him the 407th wealthiest person in China.

== Awards and honors ==
Li was inducted into the International Gymnastics Hall of Fame in 2000, becoming the first Chinese inductee.

In 2017, a statue was erected in his honor on the shores of Lake Geneva in Montreux.

At the 2008 Summer Olympics, Li ignited the cauldron at the opening ceremony after being hoisted high into the air with cables and miming running around the stadium's rim.

== Personal life ==
Li is married to Chen Yongyan, a fellow gymnast who won an Olympic bronze in 1984.

== Filmography ==
- To Cross the Dadu River (1980)
- Uprising of Nam Cheong City (1981) as Wang Jing-Wei
- Liberation of Nanjing (1982)
- Suspended Sentence (1985)
- The Thief Master (1988)
- Fire on the Great Wall (1990) as Big Brother
- Wonder Seven (1994) as Yip Fei
- In the Blue (2006)

== See also ==
- List of multiple Olympic medalists at a single Games

Olympic Games
Preceded by Stefania Belmondo	Final Olympic torchbearer Beijing 2008	Succeeded by Catriona Le May Doan, Steve Nash, Nancy Greene and Wayne Gretzky
Preceded by Nikolaos Kaklamanakis	Final Summer Olympic torchbearer Beijing 2008	Succeeded by Callum Airlie, Jordan Duckitt, Desiree Henry, Katie Kirk, Cameron MacRitchie, Aidan Reynolds, and Adelle Tracey
