= Aeromechanics =

Mechanics of air and other gases

Aeromechanics is a branch of continuum mechanics that deals with the motion of air and other gases and their effects on bodies in the flow, involving aerodynamics, thermophysics and aerostatics. The fluid flow and structure are interactive systems and their interaction is dynamic. The fluid force causes the structure to deform which changes its orientation to the flow and hence the resulting fluid force.

Areas that comprise this are within the technology of aircraft and helicopters since these use propellers and rotors. Additionally, aeromechanics is critical in the design and analysis of wind turbines, drones, and various unmanned aerial vehicles (UAVs). The principles of aeromechanics are also applied in space exploration vehicles, where the behavior of gases in different atmospheric conditions is crucial. Understanding these interactions is essential for optimizing performance, ensuring stability and control, and improving the efficiency and safety of flight and other applications involving fluid-structure interactions.

== See also ==
- Aerodynamics
