= Huang Ruifeng =

Chinese association football player

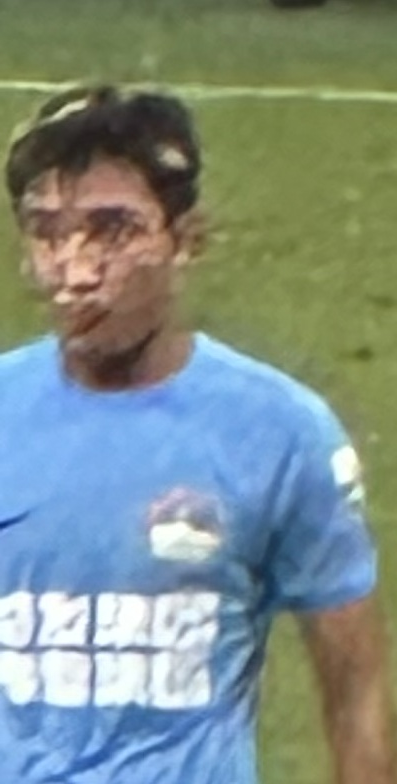
- Huang Ruifeng in August 2024

Personal information
- Date of birth: 10 November 1999 (age 27)
- Place of birth: Deyang, Sichuan, China
- Height: 1.80 m (5 ft 11 in)
- Positions: Midfielder; full-back

Team information
- Current team: Henan FC
- Number: 22

Youth career
- –2017: Sichuan FA
- 2017–2019: Tianjin Tianhai
- 2020–2021: Shenzhen FC
- 2020: → Changchun Yatai (youth loan)

Senior career*
Years	Team	Apps	(Gls)
2021–2023	Shenzhen FC	53	(0)
2024–	Henan FC	80	(0)

International career^{‡}
2017	China U19	2	(0)
- * Club domestic league appearances and goals as of 22 November 2026 ‡ National team caps and goals as of 4 November 2023 (UTC)

Huang Ruifeng (Chinese: 黄锐烽; born 10 November 1999) is a Chinese footballer currently playing as a midfielder or full-back for Henan FC.

== Club career ==
Huang Ruifeng would go through the Sichuan Football Association youth development before joining Tianjin Tianhai. On 25 February 2020 he would join fellow top tier club Shenzhen. He would briefly go on loan to Changchun Yatai before returning to Shenzhen where he go on to make his professional debut in a Chinese FA Cup game on 13 October 2021 against Shaanxi Warriors Beyond F.C. in a 7-0 victory. This would be followed by his first league appearance on 4 January 2022 against Beijing Guoan F.C. in a 1-0 defeat.

== Career statistics ==
As of 31 December 2025.

Club	Season	League			Cup		Continental		Other		Total	
Club	Season	Division	Apps	Goals	Apps	Goals	Apps	Goals	Apps	Goals	Apps	Goals
Shenzhen FC	2020	Chinese Super League	0	0	0	0	—		—		0	0
Shenzhen FC	2021	Chinese Super League	1	0	1	0	—		—		2	0
Shenzhen FC	2022	Chinese Super League	23	0	1	0	—		—		24	0
Shenzhen FC	2022	Chinese Super League	29	0	0	0	—		—		29	0
Shenzhen FC	Total		53	0	2	0	0	0	0	0	55	0
Henan FC	2024	Chinese Super League	28	0	3	0	—		—		31	0
Henan FC	2025	Chinese Super League	28	0	4	0	—		—		32	0
Henan FC	Total		56	0	7	0	0	0	0	0	63	0
Career total			109	0	9	0	0	0	0	0	118	0
