= Ivanovo State University of Chemistry and Technology =

Public university in Ivanovo, Russia

Coordinates: 56°59′54″N 40°58′54″E

- Ивановский государственный химико-технологический университет
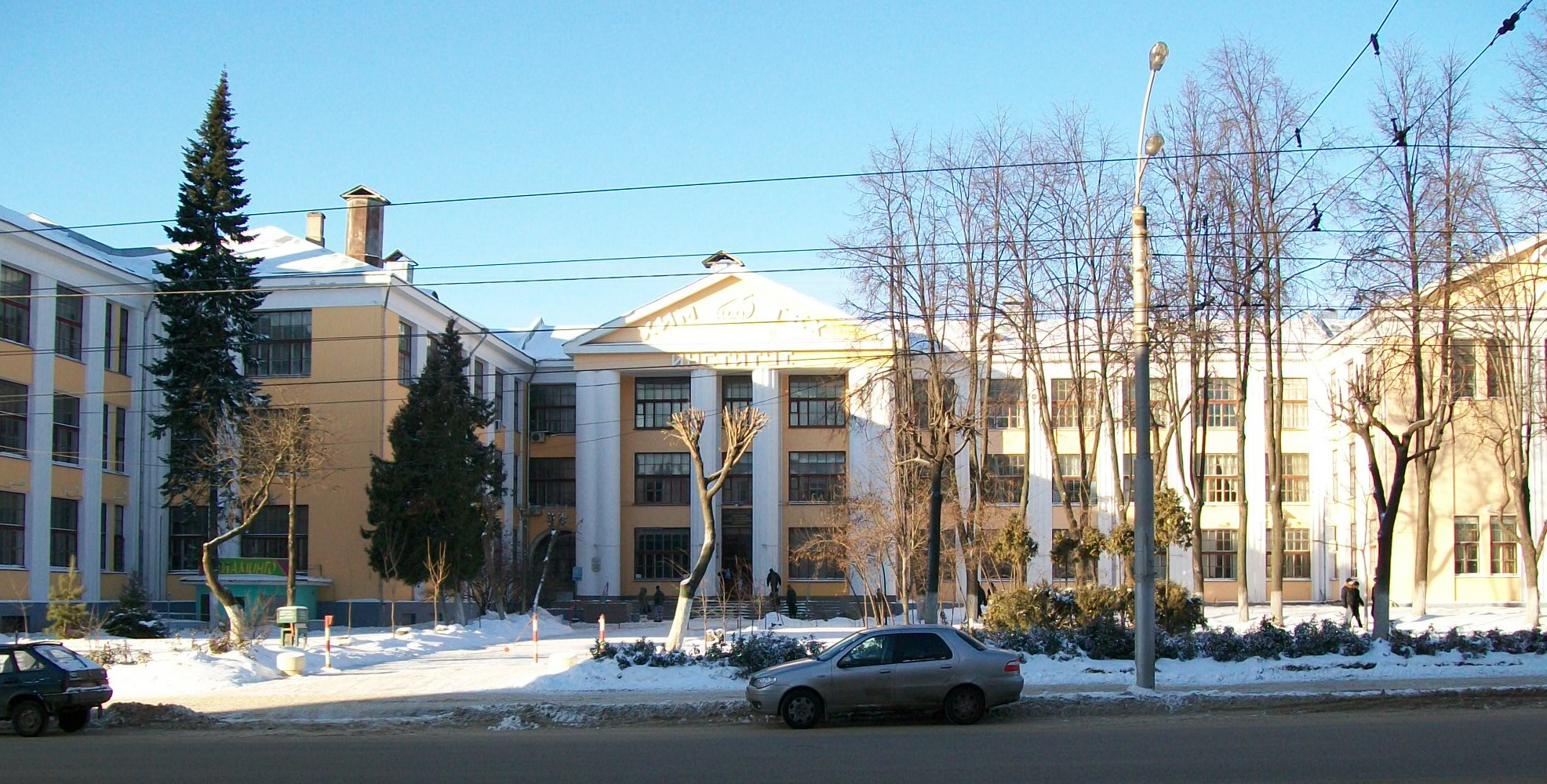
- Type: Public
- Established: 1918
- President: Oscar I. Koifman
- Rector: Natalia E. Gordina
- Location: 7, Sheremetevskiy Avenue, Ivanovo, 153000, Russia
- Campus: Urban
- Website: https://www.isuct.ru/en

The Ivanovo State University of Chemistry and Technology (Russian: Ива́новский госуда́рственный хи́мико-технологи́ческий университе́т) or ISUCT (ИГХТУ) is a public university located in Ivanovo, the administrative center of Ivanovo Oblast, Russia. Research priorities of the ISUCT are concentrated in chemical technology, chemistry and engineering.

The ISUCT takes the first place among universities in the Ivanovo region in the national ranking of universities.

== History ==
It was founded in 1918 as Chemical Faculty of Ivanovo-Vosnesensk Polytechnic Institute. In 1930, Ivanovo-Vosnessensk Polytechnic Institute was split into four independent schools: Ivanovo Textile Institute, Ivanovo Power Institute, Civil Engineering Institute, and Ivanovo Institute of Chemistry and Technology (ICTI). The latter gained a new status in 1992 and was renamed to Ivanovo State Academy of Chemistry and Technology, and in 1998 it was renamed again, becoming Ivanovo State University of Chemistry and Technology.

== Education ==
The ISUCT has a multi-level system of higher education: bachelor – 4 years, master – 2 years, post-graduate – 3–4 years, pre-university programs for foreign students – 1 year. ISUCT provides training in a range of engineering, technological, and natural sciences directions.

== Campus ==
The university is located in seven buildings:

- The main building ("Г"). The building was built in 1930 by the project of academician Fomin. It is an architectural monument.
- The building "A". This is a classroom building and it was built in the 1930s.
- The building "Б". This is a circular building. It contains large auditoriums and the library. It was built in the 1970s. The building has an unofficial name "Банка" ("Banka", English: jar).
- The building "В". The building has an unofficial name "высотка" ("visotka", English: high-rise building). It was built in the 1970s.
- The Humanitarian building ("К"). This was built in 1930 as a student dormitory. It completely renovated in 2009.
- The building "Д". The new academic building has been open since 2016.
- The building "И".
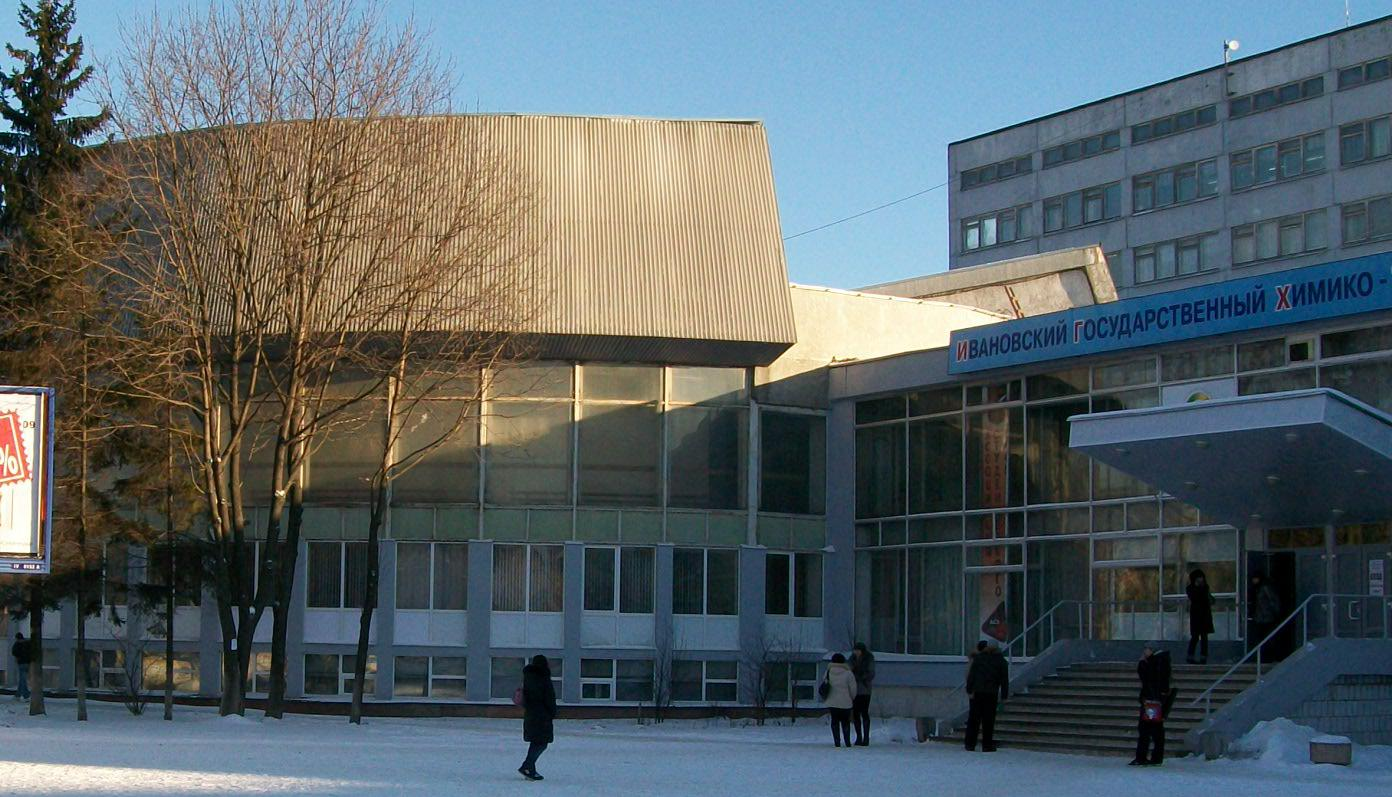
Buildings Б and В

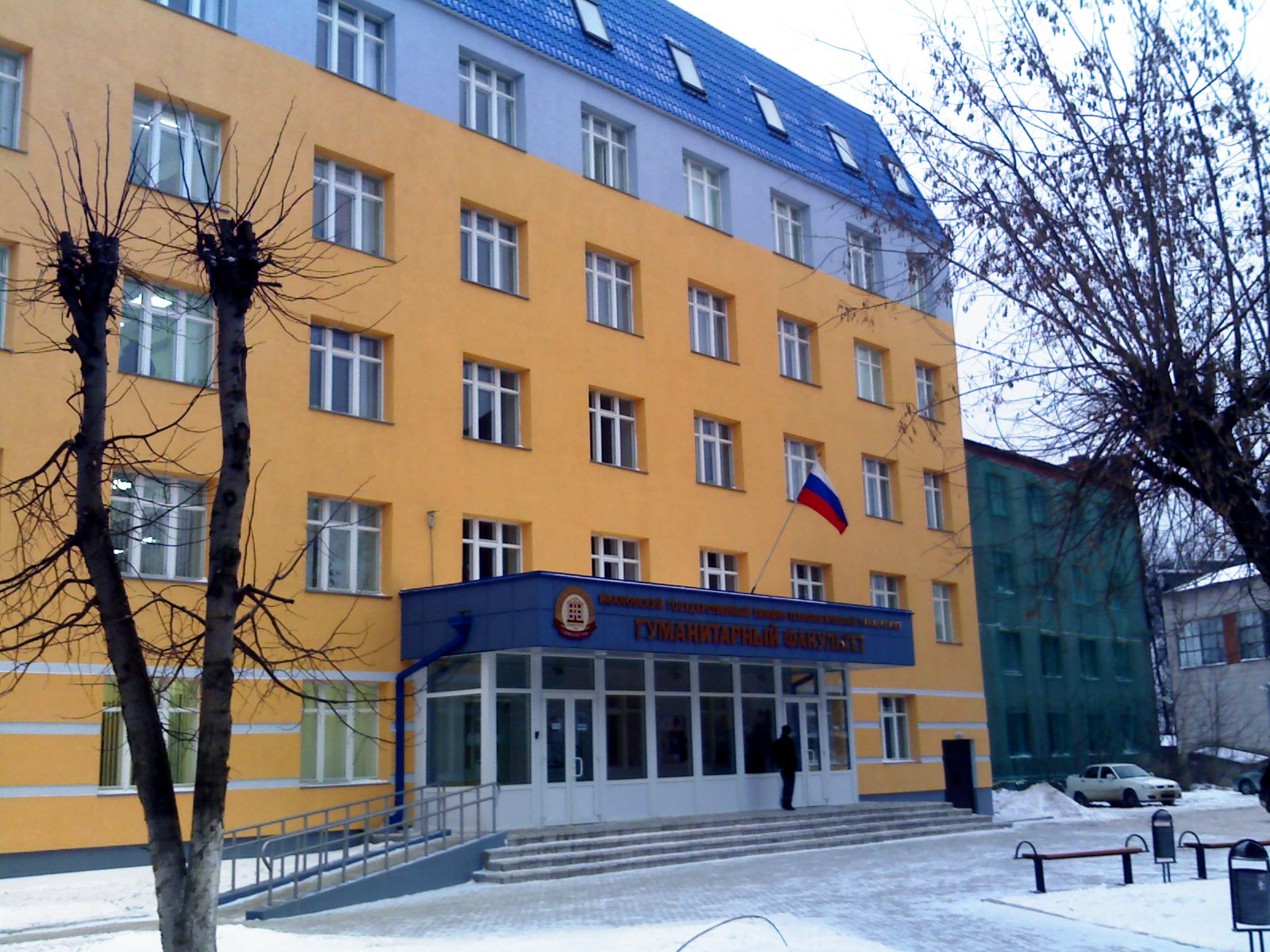
Building K

== Student life ==
The university hosts a number of events weekly. The most famous traditional student events are celebrations of Chemist's Day, concerts of Student Club, scientific conference "Fundamental Sciences for a Specialist of the New Century", etc.

The following organizations work at the university:

- Student Club
- Student Trade Union Organization
- Student Government
- Sports Club

The students take part in various intramural and extramural sport events and often become their winners. Women's basketball team is a twice Student Basketball Association champion (2011/2012, 2013/2014).

- International Club
- Art association "Sheremetev Centre"

== Research ==
Over the years of its existence the ISUCT has turned into a center of fundamental and applied science.

The ISUCT pays great attention to the development of youth research projects. In 2019, the ISUCT has received more than 30 patents for inventions and won over 20 grants. Young scientists of the ISUCT regularly win all-Russian and international competitions. In 2019, representatives of the university received one-twentieth of all scholarships of the President of Russia to study abroad.

=== Scientific infrastructure ===
The scientific infrastructure of ISUCT contains:

- Testing and analytical centres (Center for collective use of research equipment, Testing center "Quality", Center for certification of goods and equipment "RegionTest")
- Research Facilities (Institute of Macroheterocyclic Compounds Chemistry, Institute of Thermodynamics and Kinetics of Chemical Processes)
- R & D and innovation centres (Research and Production Laboratory "Ion-plasma technological processes", RPL "Technology of processing of rubber-bituminous materials", Research and Production Enterprise "Synthesis", Production site "Complex", Educational, Research and Production Centre "Nail", Research and Production Centre "Potential", Research and Production Laboratory "Chlorine")
- Scientific and Educational Centres ("Nanotechnologies", "Theoretical and Experimental Chemistry", Institute for the Development of Digital Economics, Centre for Innovative and Anti-crisis Technologies, SEC for Information, Linguistic and Educational Technologies, Practice-oriented Scientific and Engineering Club "Innovation", Research and Project Centre after A.A. Tarkovsky, Workshop of Contemporary Art "The Sixth Floor")

=== Scientific journals ===
The ISUCT publishes five scientific journals, three of which are included in the international scientific citation databases Web of Science and Scopus. All of them are included in the List of peer-reviewed scientific publications.

==== Izvestia Vuzov. Series: Khimia i Khimicheskaya Tekhnologia (Russian Journal of Chemistry and Chemical Technology) ====
This journal is the oldest scientific journal published at ISUCT: in 2018 it celebrated its 60th anniversary. The founder and the first chief editor was Professor K.B. Yatsimirsky. A specific feature of the journal is its wide profile which allows one to represent materials on chemistry and chemical technology in Russian and in English. Periodicity is 12 issues per year.

==== Macroheterocycles ====
The journal Macroheterocycles has been published at ISUCT since 2008 on the initiative of a Corresponding Member of the Russian Academy of Sciences, Doctor of Chemistry O.I. Koifman. The journal Macroheterocycles is a forum of the specialists studying macroheterocyclic compounds. It publishes original experimental and theoretical works (full papers and brief reports) and reviews on the synthesis, structure, physical and coordination chemistry of macroheterocycles as well as on their practical application.

==== Russian Chemical Journal. Journal of the Russian Chemical Society after D.I. Mendeleev ====
The journal publishes analytical reviews devoted to the problems of chemical science, technology and education, original papers and brief reports. Most issues of the journal are thematic and are devoted to a specific area of science or technology.

The Journal of the Russian Chemical Society was founded in 1869. The first editor was a Russian chemist, professor at the Imperial St. Petersburg University, corresponding member of St. Petersburg Academy of Sciences N.A. Menshutkin (1842–1907).

In 1956 the journal was renamed. The All-Union Chemical Society established the Journal of the All-Union Chemical Society named after D.I. Mendeleev edited by Academician of the Academy of Sciences of the USSR, Doctor of Chemistry I.L. Knunyants. The journal was published in Moscow in the printing house of the "Goskhimizdat" (State Chemistry Publishing Office).

In 1992, after the collapse of the USSR, the All-Union Chemical Society (ACS) ceased to exist, and since 1993 its edition was renamed to Russian Chemical Journal. Until 2013 the journal was published in Moscow and was edited by Academician of the RAS Yu.D. Tretyakov (until 2012) and Doctor of Chemistry, Professor of Moscow State University G.V. Lisichkin (2013). In 2013 the rights for the publication of the Russian Chemical Journal were transferred to the Ivanovo State University of Chemistry and Technology.

==== Modern High Technologies ====
Regional supplement to the journal of the Russian Academy of Natural Sciences Modern high technologies.

==== Izvestia Vuzov. Series: Economika, finansy i upravlenie proizvodstvom (Series "Economics, Finance and Production Management") ====
Source:

== International activity ==
The ISUCT handles foreign students since early 1950th due to either intergovernmental agreements or direct contracts. More than 4000 students study at the University. Number of foreign students is more than 200. Students from different countries studied at the university at different times. ISUCT is developing broad international contacts with universities and educational institutions of many countries of the world including Poland, Germany, Italy, Spain, China, Uzbekistan and others.

== Faculties and departments ==
=== Faculty of Inorganic Chemistry and Technology ===
Inorganic Chemistry Department

Department of Analytical Chemistry

Physical and Colloidal Chemistry Department

Electrocemical Production Technology Department

Department of General Chemical Technology

Department of Industrial Ecology

Department of Technology of Ceramics and Nanomaterials

Department of Technology of Electronic Materials and Devices

Department of Technology of Inorganic Substances

=== Faculty of Organic Chemistry and Technology ===
Organic Chemistry Department

Department of Food Technology and Biotechnology

Department of Chemistry and Technology of Higher Molecular Compounds

Fine Organic Synthesis Technology Department

Department of Chemical Technology of Fibrous Materials

=== Faculty of Engineering, Management and Digital Infrastructure ===
The Department of Processes and Apparatus of Chemical Engineering

Department of Technological Machinery and Equipment

The Department of Engineering Cybernetics and Automation

The Department of Information Technology and Digital Economy

== See also ==
- Ivanovo
