= List of gymnasts at the 1984 Summer Olympics =

This is a list of the gymnasts who represented their country at the 1984 Summer Olympics in Los Angeles from 28 July to 12 August 1984. Gymnasts across two disciplines (artistic gymnastics and rhythmic gymnastics) participated in the Games.

== Female artistic gymnasts ==
	Name	Country	Date of birth (Age)
Youngest competitor	Laura Muñoz	Spain	9 June 1970 (aged 14)
Oldest competitor	Kathy Johnson	United States	13 September 1959 (aged 24)

NOC	Name	Date of birth (Age)	Hometown
Australia	Kerri Battersby	1 September 1968 (aged 15)	
Australia	Kellie Wilson	22 October 1966 (aged 17)	
Brazil	Tatiana Figueiredo	29 June 1968 (aged 16)	Rio de Janeiro, Brazil
Canada	Anita Botnen	19 July 1965 (aged 19)	Vancouver, British Columbia
Canada	Kelly Brown	13 November 1965 (aged 18)	London, Ontario
Canada	Andrea Thomas	12 September 1968 (aged 15)	Cooksville, Ontario
Canada	Jessica Tudos	4 April 1969 (aged 15)	Toronto, Ontario
Canada	Bonnie Wittmeier	15 September 1966 (aged 17)	Winnipeg, Manitoba
Canada	Gigi Zosa	24 January 1968 (aged 16)	Winnipeg, Manitoba
China	Chen Yongyan	19 October 1962 (aged 21)	Wuzhou, Guangxi
China	Huang Qun	18 March 1969 (aged 15)	Liuzhou, Guangxi
China	Ma Yanhong	5 July 1963 (aged 21)	Dongcheng District, Beijing
China	Wu Jiani	23 April 1966 (aged 18)	Suzhou, Jiangsu
China	Zhou Ping	18 February 1968 (aged 16)	
China	Zhou Qiurui	29 September 1967 (aged 16)	
France	Florence Laborderie	7 September 1969 (aged 14)	
France	Corinne Ragazzacci	27 January 1969 (aged 15)	
Great Britain	Natalie Davies	1 December 1966 (aged 17)	Farnborough, England
Great Britain	Amanda Harrison	9 June 1965 (aged 19)	Sheffield, England
Great Britain	Sally Larner	1 March 1969 (aged 15)	Bromsgrove, England
Great Britain	Hayley Price	13 April 1966 (aged 18)	Wolverhampton, England
Great Britain	Kathleen Williams	16 March 1964 (aged 20)	Manchester, England
Great Britain	Lisa Young	3 January 1966 (aged 18)	Shropshire, England
Israel	Limor Friedman	30 January 1968 (aged 16)	
Israel	Nancy Goldsmith	4 August 1966 (aged 17)	
Italy	Laura Bortolaso	22 August 1960 (aged 23)	Vicenza, Italy
Japan	Tokie Kawase	25 September 1968 (aged 15)	
Japan	Noriko Mochizuki	16 July 1967 (aged 17)	Shizuoka, Japan
Japan	Maiko Morio	18 February 1967 (aged 17)	Kawasaki, Japan
Japan	Chihiro Ōyagi	26 June 1963 (aged 21)	
Japan	Sae Watanabe	27 December 1968 (aged 15)	
Japan	Ayami Yukimori	25 December 1969 (aged 14)	
Romania	Lavinia Agache	11 February 1968 (aged 16)	Căiuți, Romania
Romania	Laura Cutina	13 September 1968 (aged 15)	Bucharest, Romania
Romania	Cristina Grigoraș	11 February 1966 (aged 18)	Satu Mare, Romania
Romania	Simona Păucă	19 September 1969 (aged 14)	Azuga, Romania
Romania	Mihaela Stănuleț	16 July 1967 (aged 17)	Sibiu, Romania
Romania	Ecaterina Szabo	22 January 1968 (aged 16)	Zagon, Romania
South Korea	Lee Jung-hee	10 August 1965 (aged 18)	
South Korea	Shim Jae-young	24 March 1968 (aged 16)	
Spain	Marta Artigas	11 June 1968 (aged 16)	Sitges, Spain
Spain	Margot Estévez	12 February 1968 (aged 16)	Madrid, Spain
Spain	Ana Manso	7 March 1966 (aged 18)	Tarragona, Spain
Spain	Irene Martínez	20 February 1966 (aged 18)	Madrid, Spain
Spain	Laura Muñoz	9 June 1970 (aged 14)	Madrid, Spain
Spain	Virginia Navarro	11 October 1966 (aged 17)	Madrid, Spain
Sweden	Lena Adomat	22 June 1964 (aged 20)	Västerås, Sweden
Switzerland	Monika Beer	27 November 1968 (aged 15)	
Switzerland	Bettina Ernst	14 December 1968 (aged 15)	
Switzerland	Marisa Jervella	24 September 1968 (aged 15)	
Switzerland	Romi Kessler	20 February 1963 (aged 21)	Wald, Switzerland
Switzerland	Susi Latanzio	4 December 1968 (aged 15)	
Switzerland	Natalie Seiler	18 December 1968 (aged 15)	Zürich, Switzerland
United States	Pam Bileck	1 December 1968 (aged 15)	Pittsburgh, Pennsylvania
United States	Michelle Dusserre	26 December 1968 (aged 15)	Long Beach, California
United States	Kathy Johnson	13 September 1959 (aged 24)	Oak Ridge, Tennessee
United States	Julianne McNamara	11 October 1965 (aged 18)	Flushing, New York
United States	Mary Lou Retton	24 January 1968 (aged 16)	Fairmont, West Virginia
United States	Tracee Talavera	1 September 1966 (aged 17)	Santa Clara, California
West Germany	Astrid Beckers	25 October 1965 (aged 18)	Viersen, West Germany
West Germany	Angela Golz	27 July 1969 (aged 15)	Birkenfeld, West Germany
West Germany	Elke Heine	9 January 1967 (aged 17)	Hanover, West Germany
West Germany	Brigitta Lehmann	24 October 1966 (aged 17)	Berlin, West Germany
West Germany	Heike Schwarm	17 October 1967 (aged 16)	Idar-Oberstein, West Germany
West Germany	Anja Wilhelm	26 September 1968 (aged 15)	Wolfsburg, West Germany

== Male artistic gymnasts ==
	Name	Country	Date of birth (Age)
Youngest competitor	Johan Jonasson	Sweden	9 October 1966 (aged 17)
Oldest competitor	Volker Rohrwick	West Germany	16 July 1954 (aged 30)

NOC	Name	Date of birth (Age)	Hometown
Australia	Werner Birnbaum	9 August 1963 (aged 20)	
Australia	Rob Edmonds	12 May 1962 (aged 22)	
Brazil	Gerson Gnoatto	8 October 1963 (aged 20)	Porto Alegre, Brazil
Canada	Philippe Chartrand	23 December 1963 (aged 20)	Laval, Quebec
Canada	Daniel Gaudet	16 August 1959 (aged 24)	Moncton, New Brunswick
Canada	Warren Long	16 April 1956 (aged 28)	Victoria, British Columbia
Canada	Frank Nutzenberger	6 June 1959 (aged 25)	Toronto, Ontario
Canada	Brad Peters	2 December 1962 (aged 21)	Hamilton, Ontario
Canada	Allan Reddon	20 May 1962 (aged 22)	Edmonton, Alberta
China	Li Ning	10 March 1963 (aged 21)	Laibin, Guangxi
China	Li Xiaoping	19 September 1962 (aged 21)	Ningbo, Zhejiang
China	Li Yuejiu	4 July 1957 (aged 27)	Yingkou, Liaoning
China	Lou Yun	23 June 1964 (aged 20)	Hangzhou, Zhejiang
China	Tong Fei	25 March 1961 (aged 23)	Xiajiang, Jiangxi
China	Xu Zhiqiang	4 March 1963 (aged 21)	
France	Laurent Barbiéri	30 October 1960 (aged 23)	
France	Michel Boutard	21 April 1956 (aged 28)	
France	Jean-Luc Cairon	14 February 1962 (aged 22)	
France	Jacques Def	11 November 1962 (aged 21)	
France	Joël Suty	4 July 1960 (aged 24)	
France	Philippe Vatuone	13 April 1962 (aged 22)	Sète, France
Great Britain	Terry Bartlett	2 December 1963 (aged 20)	Southampton, England
Great Britain	Carl Beynon	30 June 1964 (aged 20)	Newport, Wales
Great Britain	Keith Langley	3 June 1961 (aged 23)	Aldershot, England
Great Britain	Andrew Morris	30 November 1961 (aged 22)	Swansea, Wales
Great Britain	Eddie Van Hoof	22 August 1956 (aged 27)	Stainforth, England
Great Britain	Barry Winch	17 April 1958 (aged 26)	Carshalton, England
Israel	Ya'akov Levi	11 September 1964 (aged 19)	
Israel	Yohanan Moyal	2 October 1965 (aged 18)	
Italy	Vittorio Allievi	10 December 1962 (aged 21)	Seregno, Italy
Italy	Rocco Amboni	12 October 1959 (aged 24)	Treviolo, Italy
Italy	Diego Lazzarich	25 October 1961 (aged 22)	Mirano, Italy
Japan	Kōji Gushiken	12 November 1956 (aged 27)	Osaka, Japan
Japan	Noritoshi Hirata	1 March 1958 (aged 26)	Onomichi, Japan
Japan	Nobuyuki Kajitani	3 May 1955 (aged 29)	Saito, Japan
Japan	Shinji Morisue	22 May 1957 (aged 27)	Okayama, Japan
Japan	Koji Sotomura	23 January 1958 (aged 26)	Wakayama Prefecture, Japan
Japan	Kyoji Yamawaki	17 September 1957 (aged 26)	Saiki, Japan
Mexico	Tony Piñeda	5 January 1964 (aged 20)	
Norway	Finn Gjertsen	30 March 1959 (aged 25)	Sandefjord, Norway
Romania	Emilian Nicula	29 May 1963 (aged 21)	Bucharest, Romania
Romania	Valentin Pîntea	19 April 1962 (aged 22)	Lugoj, Romania
San Marino	Maurizio Zonzini	20 March 1962 (aged 22)	
South Korea	Chae Gwang-seok	25 February 1962 (aged 22)	
South Korea	Han Chung-sik	25 May 1961 (aged 23)	
South Korea	Jang Tae-eun	26 January 1964 (aged 20)	
South Korea	Ju Yeong-sam	25 March 1966 (aged 18)	
South Korea	Lee Jeong-sik	17 August 1963 (aged 20)	
South Korea	Nam Seung-gu	25 November 1963 (aged 20)	
Spain	Antonio Fraguas	19 December 1963 (aged 20)	Girona, Spain
Spain	Alfonso Rodríguez	23 December 1965 (aged 18)	Madrid, Spain
Spain	Miguel Soler	6 June 1960 (aged 24)	Barcelona, Spain
Sweden	Johan Jonasson	9 October 1966 (aged 17)	Stockholm, Sweden
Switzerland	Bruno Cavelti	21 January 1961 (aged 23)	
Switzerland	Markus Lehmann	9 March 1960 (aged 24)	
Switzerland	Urs Meister	19 April 1958 (aged 26)	
Switzerland	Marco Piatti	15 August 1958 (aged 25)	
Switzerland	Daniel Wunderlin	18 May 1960 (aged 24)	
Switzerland	Josef Zellweger	19 September 1963 (aged 20)	
United States	Bart Conner	28 March 1958 (aged 26)	Chicago, Illinois
United States	Tim Daggett	22 May 1962 (aged 22)	Springfield, Massachusetts
United States	Mitch Gaylord	10 March 1961 (aged 23)	Van Nuys, California
United States	Jim Hartung	7 June 1960 (aged 24)	Omaha, Nebraska
United States	Scott Johnson	12 July 1961 (aged 23)	Cincinnati, Ohio
United States	Peter Vidmar	3 June 1961 (aged 23)	Los Angeles, California
West Germany	Jürgen Geiger	19 May 1959 (aged 25)	Herbolzheim, West Germany
West Germany	Benno Groß	9 October 1957 (aged 26)	Saarlouis, West Germany
West Germany	Andreas Japtok	13 September 1960 (aged 23)	Bad Lauterberg, West Germany
West Germany	Volker Rohrwick	16 July 1954 (aged 30)	Westhofen, West Germany
West Germany	Bernhard Simmelbauer	20 June 1963 (aged 21)	Mühldorf, West Germany
West Germany	Daniel Winkler	17 May 1962 (aged 22)	Darmstadt, West Germany

== Rhythmic gymnasts ==
	Name	Country	Date of birth (Age)
Youngest competitor	Danijela Simić	Yugoslavia	21 August 1969 (aged 14)
Oldest competitor	Wang Xiurong	China	27 March 1959 (aged 25)

NOC	Name	Date of birth (Age)	Hometown
Australia	Linda Douglas	18 November 1965 (aged 18)	
Australia	Ann Maree Kerr	21 October 1967 (aged 16)	
Belgium	Sarina Roberti	18 April 1963 (aged 21)	Ghent, Belgium
Brazil	Rosana Favila	16 July 1964 (aged 20)	
Canada	Adrianne Dunnett	15 July 1961 (aged 23)	Toronto, Ontario
Canada	Lori Fung	21 February 1963 (aged 21)	Vancouver, British Columbia
China	Huang Xianyuan	2 February 1966 (aged 18)	
China	Wang Xiurong	27 March 1959 (aged 25)	
France	Bénédicte Augst	28 January 1968 (aged 16)	
Great Britain	Jacquie Leavy	21 April 1965 (aged 19)	Dublin, Ireland
Great Britain	Lorraine Priest	5 June 1966 (aged 18)	Leeds, England
Israel	Liat Haninowitz	2 January 1966 (aged 18)	
Italy	Cristina Cimino	20 February 1964 (aged 20)	Rome, Italy
Italy	Giulia Staccioli	6 June 1964 (aged 20)	Cagliari, Italy
Japan	Erika Akiyama	31 December 1964 (aged 19)	Fukuoka Prefecture, Japan
Japan	Hiroko Yamasaki	3 January 1960 (aged 24)	Minamikyushu, Japan
New Zealand	Tania Moss	12 February 1964 (aged 20)	Auckland, New Zealand
Norway	Schirin Zorriassateiny	3 April 1964 (aged 20)	Lørenskog, Norway
Portugal	Margarida Carmo	20 April 1969 (aged 15)	
Portugal	María João Falcão	16 November 1964 (aged 19)	
Romania	Alina Drăgan	11 May 1969 (aged 15)	Bucharest, Romania
Romania	Doina Stăiculescu	7 December 1967 (aged 16)	Bucharest, Romania
Spain	Marta Bobo	18 March 1966 (aged 18)	Ourense, Spain
Spain	Marta Cantón	28 December 1965 (aged 18)	Barcelona, Spain
Sweden	Viktoria Bengtsson	29 April 1966 (aged 18)	Halmstad, Sweden
Switzerland	Suzanne Müller	15 February 1963 (aged 21)	Interlaken, Switzerland
Switzerland	Grazia Verzasconi	14 March 1962 (aged 22)	
United States	Michelle Berube	1 March 1966 (aged 18)	Detroit, Michigan
United States	Valerie Zimring	28 March 1965 (aged 19)	Los Angeles, California
West Germany	Claudia Scharmann	13 January 1966 (aged 18)	Wattenscheid, West Germany
West Germany	Regina Weber	12 April 1963 (aged 21)	Winsen, West Germany
Yugoslavia	Milena Reljin	25 May 1967 (aged 17)	Belgrade, Yugoslavia
Yugoslavia	Danijela Simić	21 August 1969 (aged 14)	
