= Susanne Müller =

Susanne Müller may refer to:

- Susanne Müller (field hockey) (born 1972), German field hockey player
- Susanne Müller (swimmer), German swimmer

== See also ==
- Suzanne Müller (born 1963), Swiss rhythmic gymnast
