= Gymnastics at the 1984 Summer Olympics – Women's rhythmic individual all-around =

Women's rhythmic individual all-around at the Games of the XXIII Olympiad
- Pictogram for Rhythmic Gymnastics
- Venue: Pauley Pavilion
- Date: August 9 – 11, 1984
- Competitors: 33 from 20 nations

Medalists
| 1st place, gold medalist(s) | | Lori Fung | Canada |
| 2nd place, silver medalist(s) | | Doina Stăiculescu | Romania |
| 3rd place, bronze medalist(s) | | Regina Weber | West Germany |

These are the results of the rhythmic individual all-around competition in the 1984 Summer Olympics.

Women’s rhythmic individual all-around (and rhythmic gymnastics in general) was contested for the first time at these Games.

== Qualification ==
The 20 highest scoring competitors out of 33 entrants advanced to the final.

| Rank | Name | Hoop | Ball | Clubs | Ribbon | Total | Notes |
|---|---|---|---|---|---|---|---|
| 1 | Doina Stăiculescu (ROU) | 9.700 | 9.600 | 9.850 | 9.350 | 38.500 | Q |
| 2 | Alina Drăgan (ROU) | 9.650 | 9.500 | 9.650 | 9.250 | 38.050 | Q |
| 3 | Lori Fung (CAN) | 9.650 | 9.350 | 9.600 | 9.200 | 37.800 | Q |
| 3 | Milena Reljin (YUG) | 9.450 | 9.450 | 9.450 | 9.450 | 37.800 | Q |
| 3 | Marta Canton (ESP) | 9.450 | 9.600 | 9.600 | 9.150 | 37.800 | Q |
| 6 | Giulia Staccioli (ITA) | 9.600 | 9.300 | 9.700 | 9.150 | 37.750 | Q |
| 7 | Regina Weber (FRG) | 9.600 | 9.450 | 9.300 | 9.250 | 37.600 | Q |
| 8 | Marta Bobo (ESP) | 9.600 | 9.600 | 9.400 | 8.950 | 37.550 | Q |
| 9 | Hiroko Yamasaki (JPN) | 9.500 | 9.300 | 9.550 | 9.100 | 37.450 | Q |
| 9 | Danijela Simić (YUG) | 9.500 | 9.300 | 9.300 | 9.350 | 37.450 | Q |
| 11 | Claudia Scharmann (FRG) | 9.500 | 9.200 | 9.350 | 9.150 | 37.200 | Q |
| 12 | Valerie Zimring (USA) | 8.850 | 9.250 | 9.500 | 9.300 | 36.900 | Q |
| 13 | Erika Akiyama (JPN) | 9.300 | 9.300 | 8.950 | 9.150 | 36.700 | Q |
| 14 | Grazia Verzasconi (SUI) | 9.300 | 8.750 | 9.150 | 9.200 | 36.400 | Q |
| 15 | Cristina Cimino (ITA) | 9.650 | 9.150 | 8.750 | 8.800 | 36.350 | Q |
| 16 | Margarida Carmo (POR) | 9.050 | 9.100 | 9.200 | 9.100 | 36.250 | Q |
| 17 | Michelle Berube (USA) | 9.000 | 9.100 | 8.850 | 9.250 | 36.200 | Q |
| 17 | Adrianne Dunnett (CAN) | 9.300 | 8.950 | 9.300 | 8.650 | 36.200 | Q |
| 19 | Schirin Zorriassateiny (NOR) | 8.950 | 9.050 | 9.250 | 8.850 | 36.100 | Q |
| 20 | Viktoria Bengtsson (SWE) | 8.800 | 9.000 | 9.150 | 9.100 | 36.050 | Q |
| 21 | Bénédicte Augst (FRA) | 9.000 | 8.950 | 9.120 | 8.850 | 35.920 | |
| 22 | María João Falcão (POR) | 9.050 | 9.000 | 9.200 | 8.650 | 35.900 | |
| 23 | Wang Xiurong (CHN) | 8.950 | 9.150 | 9.200 | 8.550 | 35.850 | |
| 24 | Sarina Roberti (BEL) | 9.000 | 9.000 | 8.900 | 8.750 | 35.650 | |
| 24 | Rosana Favila (BRA) | 8.950 | 9.150 | 9.200 | 8.550 | 35.650 | |
| 26 | Ann Maree Kerr (AUS) | 9.000 | 8.850 | 8.900 | 8.750 | 35.500 | |
| 27 | Liat Haninowitz (ISR) | 9.200 | 9.000 | 8.850 | 8.400 | 35.450 | |
| 28 | Lorraine Priest (GBR) | 8.900 | 8.800 | 8.900 | 8.650 | 35.250 | |
| 28 | Suzanne Müller (SUI) | 9.000 | 9.000 | 8.700 | 8.550 | 35.250 | |
| 30 | Tania Moss (NZL) | 8.750 | 8.850 | 9.000 | 8.600 | 35.200 | |
| 31 | Jacquie Leavy (GBR) | 9.000 | 8.950 | 8.700 | 8.450 | 35.100 | |
| 32 | Huang Xianyuan (CHN) | 9.450 | 9.250 | 7.800 | 8.300 | 34.800 | |
| 33 | Linda Douglas (AUS) | 8.600 | 8.700 | 8.650 | 8.200 | 34.150 | |

== Final ==
| Rank | Name | Prelim | Hoop | Ball | Clubs | Ribbon | Total | Final |
|---|---|---|---|---|---|---|---|---|
| Gold medal | Lori Fung (CAN) | 18.900 | 9.700 | 9.750 | 9.800 | 9.800 | 39.050 | 57.950 |
| Silver medal | Doina Stăiculescu (ROU) | 19.250 | 9.700 | 9.900 | 9.800 | 9.250 | 38.650 | 57.900 |
| Bronze medal | Regina Weber (FRG) | 18.800 | 9.750 | 9.700 | 9.700 | 9.750 | 38.900 | 57.700 |
| 4 | Alina Drăgan (ROU) | 19.025 | 9.650 | 9.750 | 9.700 | 9.250 | 38.350 | 57.375 |
| 5 | Milena Reljin (YUG) | 18.900 | 9.450 | 9.650 | 9.550 | 9.700 | 38.350 | 57.250 |
| 6 | Marta Canton (ESP) | 18.900 | 9.550 | 9.400 | 9.550 | 9.550 | 38.050 | 56.950 |
| 7 | Giulia Staccioli (ITA) | 18.875 | 9.650 | 9.600 | 9.400 | 9.250 | 37.900 | 56.775 |
| 8 | Hiroko Yamasaki (JPN) | 18.725 | 9.550 | 9.700 | 9.400 | 9.300 | 37.950 | 56.675 |
| 9 | Marta Bobo (ESP) | 18.775 | 9.000 | 9.700 | 9.750 | 9.150 | 37.600 | 56.375 |
| 10 | Danijela Simić (YUG) | 18.725 | 9.500 | 9.400 | 9.300 | 9.400 | 37.600 | 56.325 |
| 11 | Valerie Zimring (USA) | 18.450 | 9.550 | 9.450 | 9.500 | 9.300 | 37.800 | 56.250 |
| 12 | Claudia Scharmann (FRG) | 18.600 | 9.500 | 9.400 | 9.500 | 9.250 | 37.650 | 56.250 |
| 13 | Erika Akiyama (JPN) | 18.350 | 9.450 | 9.350 | 9.400 | 9.500 | 37.700 | 56.050 |
| 14 | Michelle Berube (USA) | 18.100 | 9.350 | 9.550 | 9.400 | 9.400 | 37.700 | 55.800 |
| 15 | Cristina Cimino (ITA) | 18.175 | 9.350 | 9.350 | 9.400 | 9.300 | 37.400 | 55.575 |
| 16 | Grazia Verzasconi (SUI) | 18.200 | 9.300 | 9.250 | 9.100 | 9.250 | 36.900 | 55.100 |
| 17 | Adrianne Dunnett (CAN) | 18.100 | 9.300 | 9.300 | 9.200 | 8.800 | 36.600 | 54.700 |
| 18 | Margarida Carmo (POR) | 18.125 | 9.150 | 9.150 | 9.150 | 9.000 | 36.450 | 54.575 |
| 19 | Viktoria Bengtsson (SWE) | 18.025 | 8.950 | 9.000 | 9.150 | 9.350 | 36.450 | 54.475 |
| 20 | Schirin Zorriassateiny (NOR) | 18.050 | 8.950 | 9.250 | 9.400 | 8.650 | 36.250 | 54.300 |
