= Linda Douglas (disambiguation) =

Linda Douglas may refer to:

- Linda Douglas (1928–2017), actress and wife of Hank Greenberg
- Linda Douglass, director of communications for the White House Office of Health Reform
- Linda Douglas (gymnast) (born 1965), Australian rhythmic gymnast
