= Victoria Ystborg =

Norwegian rhythmic gymnast (born 1970)

- Born: 23 March 1970 (age 56) Norway

Gymnastics career
- Discipline: Rhythmic gymnastics
- Country represented: Norway; (1985-1988)
- Club: Siv GF
- Retired: yes

Victoria Ystborg (born 23 March 1970) is a retired Norwegian rhythmic gymnast. She represented Norway in international competitions.

== Career ==
In 1985 Ystborg won gold in the All-Around and with clubs, silver with ribbon and bronze with rope at the Norwegian Championships. In October she made her World Championships debut in Valladolid, competing along Ellen Gunderson and Schirin Zorriassateiny, being 45th overall.

The following year she got gold overall, with ball, and with ribbon as well silver with rope at nationals. She was then selected for the European Championships in Florence, being 41st in the All-Around.

In 1987 she took all the gold medals at the Norwegian Championships, and was called up for the World Championships in Varna, Bulgaria, being 43rd in the All-Around.

She repeated her national accolades in 1988. In May she competed at the European Championships in Helsinki, being 45th in the All-Around.

At the 1989's nationals she won gold in the All-Around, with rope, with ball and with ribbon, also taking silver with hoop. After a year of stop she competed again nationally in 1991, winning gold with rope, silver with clubs and bronze in the All-Around, with hoop and with ball.

In 1992 she took bronze with hoop at the Norwegian Championships. She retired from the sport shortly after.
