= Japanese Rhythmic Gymnastics Championships =

The Japanese Rhythmic Gymnastics Championship is the most important national rhythmic gymnastics competition in Japan. It has been organised by the Japanese Gymnastics Federation since 1948.

== Medalists ==
Year	Women Individual	Women Group	Men Individual	Men Group
1948				
1949				
1950				
1951		Tokyo Women's University of Physical Education		
1952		Hakodate Orelop Club		Nippon Sport Science University
1953		Tokyo Women's University of Physical Education		
1955		Tokyo Women's University of Physical Education		
1955		Tokyo Women's University of Physical Education		
1956		Tokyo Women's University of Physical Education		
1957		Tokyo Women's University of Physical Education		
1958		Tokyo Women's University of Physical Education		
1959		Tokyo Women's University of Physical Education		
1960		Tokyo Women's University of Physical Education		Kokushikan University
1961		Tokyo Women's University of Physical Education		Kokushikan University
1962		Tokyo Women's University of Physical Education		Kanagawa University
1963		Tokyo Women's University of Physical Education		Kokushikan University
1964		Tokyo Women's University of Physical Education		Kokushikan University
1965		Tokyo Women's University of Physical Education		Chukyo University
1966		Tokyo Women's University of Physical Education		Kokushikan University
1967		Tokyo Women's University of Physical Education		Kokushikan University
1968		Tokyo Women's University of Physical Education		Kokushikan University
1969	Kaie Nagai	Tokyo Women's University of Physical Education		Kokushikan University
1970	Isuyo Kobayashi	Tokyo Women's University of Physical Education		
1971	Takako Fukutomi	Tokyo Women's University of Physical Education Kagoshima Junshin Girls' High School	Shigeo Kusumi	Kokushikan University
1972	Isuyo Kobayashi	Tokyo Women's University of Physical Education		Kokushikan University
1973	Michiyo Kurokawa	Tokyo Women's University of Physical Education		
1974	Takachika Midori	Tokyo Women's University of Physical Education	Shingo Maruyama	Kokushikan University
1975	Sachiko Marumono	Tokyo Women's University of Physical Education	Iwa Minsei	Chukyo University
1976	Yoko Morino	Tokyo Women's University of Physical Education	Iwa Minsei	Kokushikan University
1977	Yumiko Kobayashi	Japan Women's College of Physical Education	Iwa Minsei	Chukyo University
1978	Kumiko Roku	Tokyo Women's University of Physical Education	Itaru Miyazaki	Kokushikan University
1979	Hiroko Yamasaki	Tokyo Women's University of Physical Education	Itaru Miyazaki	Kokushikan University
1980	Hiroko Yamasaki	Tokyo Women's University of Physical Education	Yuu Osaka	Kokushikan University
1981	Hiroko Yamasaki	Kagoshima Junshin Girls' High School	Koji Ito	Kokushikan University
1982	Hiroko Yamasaki	Tokyo Women's University of Physical Education	Tomohiro Nakayama	Chukyo University Kokushikan University
1983	Hiroko Yamasaki	Tokyo Women's University of Physical Education	Tomohiro Nakayama	Chukyo University
1984	Erika Akiyama	Saga Girls' High School	Tomohiro Nakayama	Kokushikan University
1985	Erika Akiyama	Tokyo Women's University of Physical Education	Yoichi Nakamura	Kokushikan University
1986	Erika Akiyama	Tokyo Women's University of Physical Education	Hiroyuki Ishizeki	Kokushikan University
1987	Erika Akiyama	Tokyo Women's University of Physical Education	Hiroyuki Ishizeki	Kokushikan University
1988	Erika Akiyama	Tokyo Women's University of Physical Education	Kenju Seki	Kokushikan University
1989	Erika Akiyama	Tokyo Women's University of Physical Education	Yugo Uchiumi	Kokushikan University
1990	Yukari Kawamoto	Tokyo Women's University of Physical Education	Yugo Uchiumi	Kokushikan University
1991	Yukari Kawamoto	Tokyo Women's University of Physical Education	Yugo Uchiumi	Kokushikan University
1992	Yukari Kawamoto	Tokyo Women's University of Physical Education	Yugo Uchiumi	Kokushikan University
1993	Yukari Kawamoto	Tokyo Women's University of Physical Education	Teruhiko Kawasaki	Kokushikan University
1994	Yukari Kawamoto	Tokyo Women's University of Physical Education		Kokushikan University
1995	Akane Yamao	Tokyo Women's University of Physical Education	Kenji Asano	Kokushikan University
1996	Akane Yamao	Tokyo Women's University of Physical Education	Kenji Asano	Kokushikan University
1997	Rieko Matsunaga	Tokyo Women's University of Physical Education	Kenji Asano	Kokushikan University
1998	Rieko Matsunaga	Tokyo Women's University of Physical Education	Kotaro Yamada	Kokushikan University
1999	Rieko Matsunaga	Tokyo Women's University of Physical Education	Tomotaka Murakami	Chukyo University
2000	Rieko Matsunaga	Tokyo Women's University of Physical Education	Kotaro Yamada	Kokushikan University
2001	Yukari Murata	Tokyo Women's University of Physical Education	Kiyoshi Sugimoto	Kokushikan University
2002	Yukari Murata	Tokyo Women's University of Physical Education	Abe Kinori	Kokushikan University
2003	Yukari Murata	Tokyo Women's University of Physical Education	Kotaro Noda	Aomori University
2004	Yukari Murata	Tokyo Women's University of Physical Education	Kiyoshi Sugimoto	Aomori University
2005	Yukari Murata	Tokyo Women's University of Physical Education	Kotaro Noda	Aomori University
2006	Yukari Murata	Tokyo Women's University of Physical Education	Shuichi Ohara	Aomori University
2007	Yokochi Ai	Tokyo Women's University of Physical Education	Masatsugu Kitamura	Aomori University
2008	Mai Hidaka	Tokyo Women's University of Physical Education	Katsuyuki Kasuga	Kokushikan University
2009	Mai Hidaka	Tokyo Women's University of Physical Education	Katsuyuki Kasuga	Aomori University
2010	Yuria Onuki	Japan Women's University of Physical Education	Masatsugu Kitamura	Aomori University
2011	Runa Yamaguchi	Japan Women's University of Physical Education	Masatsugu Kitamura	Aomori University
2012	Runa Yamaguchi	Japan Women's University of Physical Education	Yoki Matsuda	Aomori University
2013	Runa Yamaguchi	Japan Women's University of Physical Education	Takedai Saito	Aomori University
2014	Uzume Kawasaki	Japan Women's University of Physical Education	Takedai Saito	Aomori University
2015	Uzume Kawasaki	Japan Women's University of Physical Education	Kohei Ogawa	Aomori University
2016	Uzume Kawasaki	Japan Women's University of Physical Education	Yuka Usui	Aomori University
2017	Takana Tatsuzawa	Japan Women's University of Physical Education	Naoya Nagai	Aomori University
2018	Sumire Kita	Japan Women's University of Physical Education	Shoji Fukunaga	Aomori University
2019	Sumire Kita	Japan Women's University of Physical Education	Takuto Kawato	Aomori University
2020	Sumire Kita	Japan Women's University of Physical Education	Riyu Ando	Kokushikan University
2021	Aino Yamada	Japan Women's University of Physical Education	Kosuke Hori	Aomori University
2022	Sumire Kita	Japan Women's University of Physical Education	Kosuke Hori	Aomori University
2023	Mei Tsuruta	Showa Gakuin High School Japan Women's University of Physical Education	Yuya Higashimoto	Aomori University
2024	Mirano Kita	Tokyo Women's University of Physical Education	Kosuke Hori	Aomori University
2025	Naruha Suzuki	Japan Women's University of Physical Education	So Murayama	
