= Mei Tsuruta =

Japanese rhythmic gymnast

- 鶴田 芽生
- Born: 1 November 2006 (age 19) Aichi Prefecture, Japan

Gymnastics career
- Discipline: Rhythmic gymnastics
- Country represented: Japan (2023-present)
- Club: Meijo University Jr Rhythmic Gymnastics Club

Mei Tsuruta (Japanese: 鶴田 芽生; born 1 November 2006) is a Japanese rhythmic gymnast. She represents Japan in international competitions.

== Career ==
Tsuruta took up the sport at age six after being taken to classes by her parents. In 2022, her first year as a senior, she was invited to the selection meet for the Japanese national team, being 9th overall, 4th with hoop and 5th with ribbon.

In 2023, she was selected for the 2022 Asian Games in Hangzhou alongside Yume Kaiho and Reina Matsusaka. There she was 15th in the All-Around during qualifications and 4th in teams. Later in the year, she won gold in the All-Around and silver with clubs at the Japanese Championships.

The following year, she competed at the World Challenge Cup in Cluj-Napoca, being 27th in the All-Around, 24th with hoop, 14th with ball, 38th with clubs and 29th with ribbon. In November she won bronze overall and gold with ball, clubs and ribbon at nationals.

In early 2025, she underwent a training camp in Uzbekistan. In April, she took part in the World Cup in Sofia, being 52nd in the All-Around, 62nd with hoop, 18th with ball, 71st with clubs and 58th with ribbon. Weeks later, in Baku, she finished 32nd in the All-Around, 34th with hoop, 28th with ball, 50th with clubs and 23rd with ribbon. In July, she was selected for the Universiade in the Rhine-Ruhr region of Germany, taking 13th place in the All-Around, 12th with hoop, 8th with ball, 21st with clubs and 19th with ribbon. In late November she became the runner-up, behind Naruha Suzuki, at the Japanese Championships.

In 2026, she made her seasonal debut at the World Cup in Tashkent where she was 27th in the all-around.
