= Takana Tatsuzawa =

Japanese rhythmic gymnast

- 立澤 孝菜; 立沢 孝菜
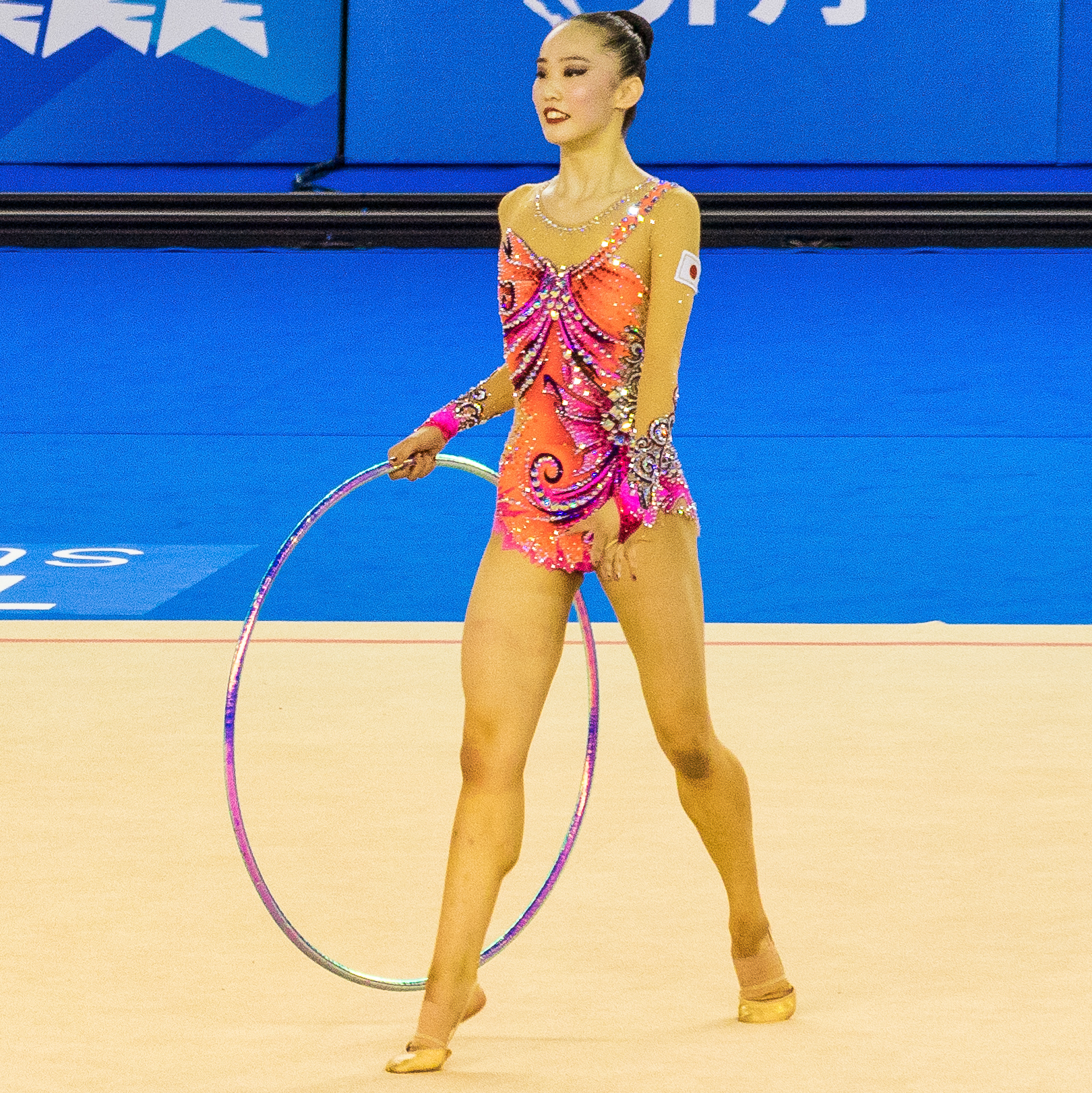
- Tatsuzawa at the 2017 Summer Universiade

Personal information
- Born: 13 February 1999 (age 27) Nagano Prefecture, Japan

Gymnastics career
- Discipline: Rhythmic gymnastics
- Country represented: Japan
- Club: AEON
- Retired: 2020
Medal record
Representing Japan
Rhythmic Gymnastics
Summer Universiade
Bronze medal – third place	2017 Taipei	Ribbon
Asian Championships
Bronze medal – third place	2019 Pattaya	Team

Takana Tatsuzawa (立澤 孝菜 or 立沢 孝菜; born 13 February 1999) is a Japanese retired individual rhythmic gymnast. She won a bronze medal at the 2017 Summer Universiade as well as at the 2019 Asian Championships.

== Early and personal life ==
Tatsuzawa was born in Nagano Prefecture. She attended Kokushikan University and graduated from the School of Asia 21 in 2021.

== Career ==
As a junior, Tatsuzawa competed in the 2014 Summer Youth Olympics in Nanjing. She was 12th in the qualification round and so did not advance to the final. At the 2014 Asian Junior Championships, she placed 10th in the all-around and won bronze in the team event.

In 2016, she was selected for the Asian Championships in Tashkent. There, she was 15th in the all-around, with her best result being 10th with clubs and her worst 30th with hoop. A week later, she made her World Cup debut, also in Tashkent, finishing 19th overall.

In 2017, she took part in the World Cup in Pesaro, where she placed 21st in the all-around. In May, she competed in another World Cup in Sofia and finished 19th place in the all-around. In July, she helped her club, AEON, win the Japanese Club Championships. A month later, she competed in the Summer Universiade in Taipei. She was 6th in the all-around. She qualified to three apparatus finals, where was 4th with hoop and 5th with clubs; she won bronze with ribbon behind Yulia Bravikova and Ekaterina Selezneva. In October, she was crowned national champion at the Japanese Championships, and she also won two apparatus titles in clubs and ribbon.

In 2018, Tatsuzawa fell to 11th at the Japan Championships. The next year, she was selected for the Asian Championships in Pattaya, where she won bronze in the team event along with her teammates Aino Yamada, Ryoko Inomata and Ruriko Shibayama. She won bronze at the Japan Championships.

At the 2020 Japanese Championships, she came in second behind Sumire Kita and tied with her in the clubs event.

She was a co-author on a study on rhythmic gymnastics biomechanics published in 2024.
