= Favilla (surname) =

Favilla is a surname of Italian origin, meaning "spark", likely a nickname for a lively person. Notable people with the surname include:

- Mauro Favilla (1934–2021), Italian politician
- Rosane Favilla (born 1964), Brazilian rhythmic gymnast
