= Adrianne Dunnett =

Canadian rhythmic gymnast

- Born: July 15, 1961 (age 65) Toronto, Ontario, Canada
- Height: 172 cm (5 ft 8 in) (at the 1984 Olympics)

Gymnastics career
- Discipline: Rhythmic gymnastics
- Country represented: Canada
- Head coach: Liliana Dimitrova

Adrianne Dunnett-Yeates (née Dunnett; born July 15, 1961) is a Canadian former rhythmic gymnast who competed both as a group member and an individual during her career. She competed at the 1984 Summer Olympics.

== Career ==
Dunnett began rhythmic gymnastics when she was 14. She spent seven years as a member of the national group, before deciding in 1981 to attempt to make the 1984 Summer Olympics as an individual gymnast. In 1978, she was a member of the group that won the Canadian Championships group competition.

Dunnett won the 1983 Canadian trials to select the team for the 1983 World Championships, ahead of Lori Fung. She had also begun working as a coach. At the World Championships, she tied for 61st place with María João Falcão.

Two days before the Canadian Championships where the 1984 Olympic team would be decided, she broke her foot. She arrived at the competition with a cast on her foot, and her coach made her case to the Olympic selection committee. Based on her previous results, Dunnett was ultimately selected for the team along with Fung.

Dunnett competed in the rhythmic gymnastics competition at the 1984 Summer Olympics in Los Angeles. There she tied for 17th place in the preliminary (qualification) round and advanced to the final of 20 competitors. In the final round, she again finished in 17th place overall, with her best score being 11th place with the clubs.

After retiring from her competitive career, Dunnett continued coaching, including coaching groups. She also worked as a commentator for CBC Television and TSN and acted as a spokesperson for Hasbro in Canada.
