= Mirano Kita =

Japanese rhythmic gymnast

- 喜田未来乃
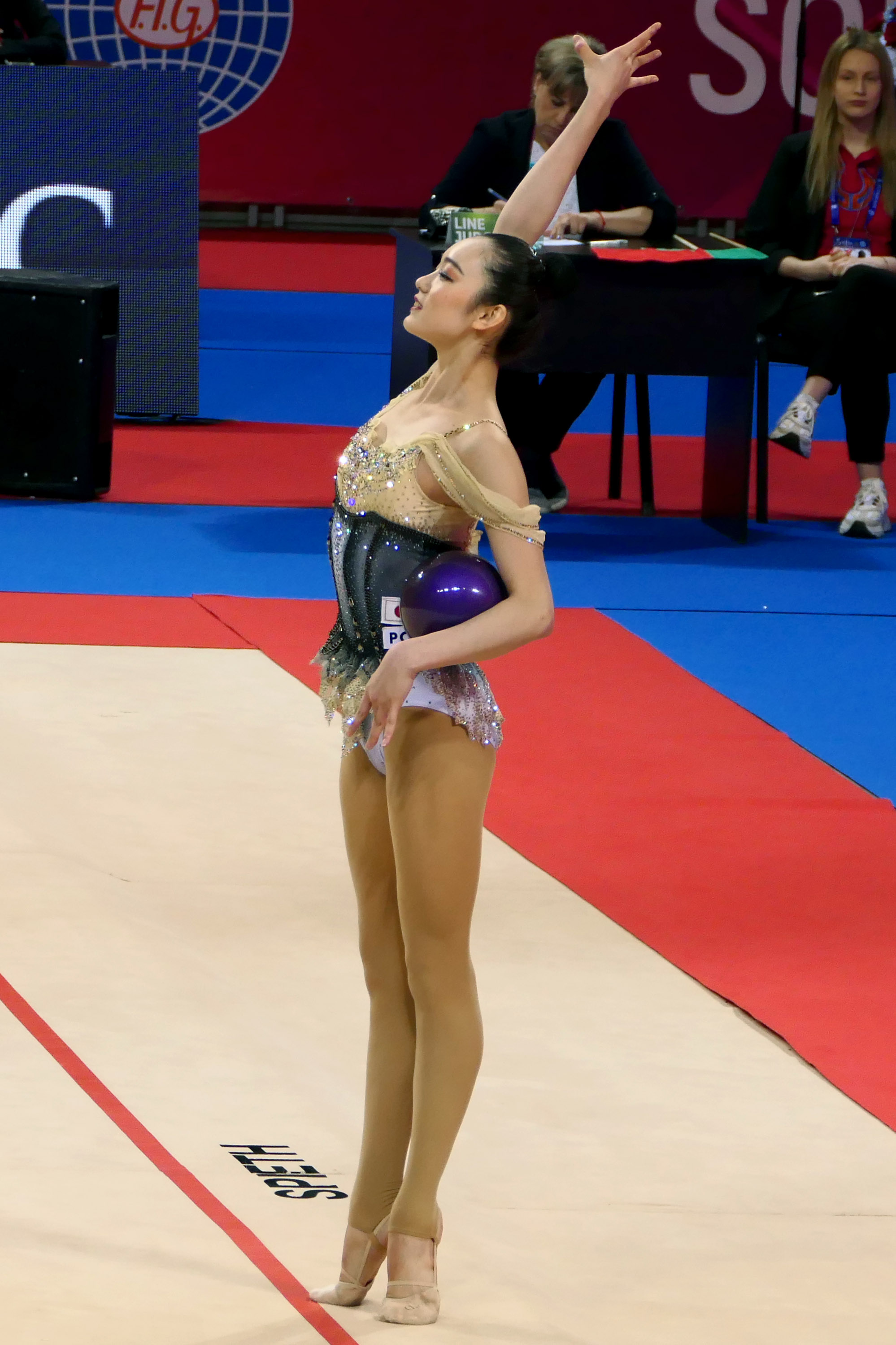
- Kita in 2024

Personal information
- Born: 16 February 2006 (age 20) Kagawa Prefecture, Japan

Gymnastics career
- Discipline: Rhythmic gymnastics
- Country represented: Japan; (2019-)
- Club: Angel RG Kagawa
- Gym: Takamatsu Chuo High School
- Head coach: Liu Yu
Medal record
Representing Japan
Rhythmic Gymnastics
Asian Championships
Silver medal – second place	2025 Singapore	Hoop
Bronze medal – third place	2024 Tashkent	Team
Bronze medal – third place	2022 Pattaya	Team
Bronze medal – third place	2025 Singapore	Team

Mirano Kita (born 16 February 2006) is a Japanese rhythmic gymnast. She represents her country in international competitions.

== Personal life ==
Mirano began the sport at age five. She was influenced by her older sister, Sumire, who also competed in rhythmic gymnastics at the international level.

== Career ==
=== Junior ===
Kita debuted at the 2019 Junior World Championships in Moscow, placing 17th in teams, 29th with rope, 40th with ball, 19th with clubs and 8th with ribbon.

=== Senior ===
In 2022 she became a senior. She competed at the World Challenge Cup in Portimão, ending 14th in the all-around, 13th with hoop, 19th with ball, 11th with clubs and 18th with ribbon. She was then selected for the Asian Championships in Pattaya alongside her sister and the senior group. The Japanese gymnasts won bronze in the team category. In August she competed at the World Challenge Cup in Cluj-Napoca, taking 29th place in the all-around, 34th with hoop, 28th with ball, 28th with clubs and 23rd with ribbon.

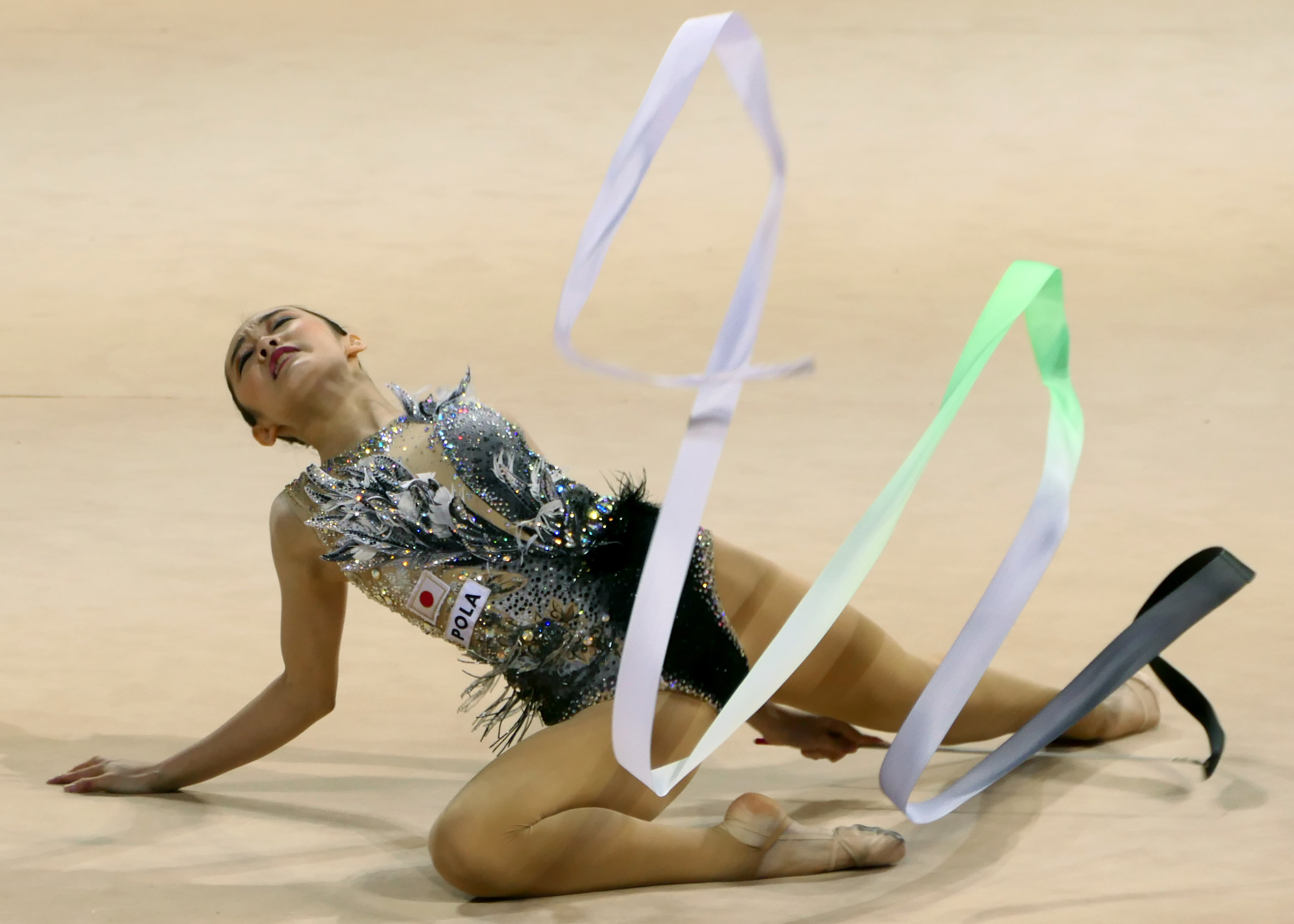
Kita performing with the ribbon at the 2024 Sofia World Cup

In March 2023, Kita competed at the first World Cup event in Palaio Faliro, where she finished 27th in the all-around. The next month, she competed at the World Cup in Tashkent and ended in 16th place in the all-around. She also competed at the World Challenge Cup in Portimão and finished in 12th. A few weeks later, she competed at the 2023 Asian Championships; she was 7th in the all-around and qualified for all four apparatus finals. In August, she represented Japan at her first senior World Championships in Valencia, and she came in 33rd in the all-around.

Kita competed at the 2024 World Cup stage in Sofia in April. In May, she participated in the 2024 Asian Championships; she was 6th individually and won bronze with the other Japanese gymnasts in the team competition. There was one Olympic berth available at the competition, which Kita did not win.

In 2025, she competed at Sofia World Cup and took 45th place in all-around. Next, she competed at Baku World Cup, taking 22nd place in all-around. She won the silver medal in hoop at the 2025 Asian Championships in Singapore and placed 8th in the all-around. In July, she competed at the 2025 Summer World University Games in Rhine-Ruhr, Germany, where she took 8th place in the all-around. She qualified to the clubs final, finishing 5th.

In August, she represented Japan at the 2025 World Championships in Rio de Janeiro, Brazil, where she took 27th place in all-around qualifications and did not advance to the final. In November, she won the silver medal in the all-around behind Naruha Suzuki at the Japanese Championships.

In 2026, she started the season competing at the Sofia World Cup and ended in 28th place in the all-around. In May, she competed at the 2026 Asian Championships in Bishkek and placed 9th in the all-around final. She was 7th in clubs and 5th in the ribbon final. In June, she competed at Beijing World Challenge Cup, taking 14th place in the all-around. In July, she took 25th place in the all-around at the Milan World Cup and almost qualified to the hoop final (9th place). In August, she was again selected to represent Japan at the 2026 World Championships in Frankfurt, Germany. She took 22nd place in all-around qualifications, improving her result from 2025. In October, she competed at the 2026 Asian Games in Nagoya, Japan. She took 6th place in the all-around final.

== Routine music information ==
Year	Apparatus	Music title
2026	Hoop	Undone by Tommee Profitt, Fleurie
2026	Ball	SOS d'un terrien en détresse by Dimash Qudaibergen
2026	Clubs	Swag Se Swagat by Neha Bhasin
2026	Ribbon	View of Silence by Joe Hisaishi
2025	Hoop	Undone by Tommee Profitt, Fleurie
2025	Ball	
2025	Clubs	Carmen Suite: II. Dance by Gennady Rozhdestvensky, Orchestra of the Bolshoi Theatre
2025	Ribbon	View of Silence by Joe Hisaishi
2023	Hoop	Speak Softly Love by Simone
2023	Ball	Elegie: O doux printemps d'autrefois by Joshua Bell
2023	Clubs	Bedrooms Hymns by Florence + The Machine
2023	Ribbon	Swan Lake by Tchaikovsky
2022	Hoop	Concerto de Berlin by Vladimir Cosma
2022	Ball	Elegie: O doux printemps d'autrefois by Joshua Bell
2022	Clubs	Buttons by The Pussycat Dolls
2022	Ribbon	Seven Nation Army by The White Stripes
