= Norwegian Rhythmic Gymnastics Championships =

Gymnastics competition in Norway

The Norwegian Rhythmic Gymnastics Championships (formerly called gymnastique moderne and rhythmic sports gymnastics) has been organized by the Norwegian Gymnastics and Gymnastics Association every year since 1976.

== Medalists ==
| Year | All-Around | Rope | Hoop | Ball | Clubs | Ribbon |
|---|---|---|---|---|---|---|
| 1976 | Marianne Reme | – | – | – | – | – |
| 1977 | Marianne Reme | – | – | – | – | – |
| 1978 | Marianne Reme | – | – | – | – | – |
| 1979 | Mette Guldberg | Mette Guldberg | – | Marianne Reme | Mette Guldberg | Mette Guldberg |
| 1980 | Mette Guldberg | Marianne Reme | Mette Guldberg | – | Mette Guldberg | Mette Guldberg |
| 1981 | Marianne Reme | Hilde Sørhaug | Marianne Reme | – | Marianne Reme | Schirin Zorriassateiny |
| 1982 | Schirin Zorriassateiny | Schirin Zorriassateiny | Schirin Zorriassateiny | – | Anne Langmoen | Schirin Zorriassateiny |
| 1983 | Schirin Zorriassateiny | – | Britt Vassdal | Schirin Zorriassateiny | Schirin Zorriassateiny Britt Vassdal | Schirin Zorriassateiny |
| 1984 | Schirin Zorriassateiny | – | Line Gudal | Schirin Zorriassateiny | Schirin Zorriassateiny | Schirin Zorriassateiny |
| 1985 | Victoria Ystborg | Ranja Andersen | – | Ellen Gundersen | Victoria Ystborg | Schirin Zorriassateiny |
| 1986 | Victoria Ystborg | Ylje Wiede | – | Victoria Ystborg | Victoria Ystborg | Victoria Ystborg |
| 1987 | Victoria Ystborg | Victoria Ystborg | Victoria Ystborg | – | Victoria Ystborg | Victoria Ystborg |
| 1988 | Victoria Ystborg | Victoria Ystborg | Victoria Ystborg | – | Victoria Ystborg | Victoria Ystborg |
| 1989 | Victoria Ystborg | Victoria Ystborg | Stine Østvold | Victoria Ystborg | – | Victoria Ystborg |
| 1990 | Stine Østvold Kristine Ingvaldsen | Stine Østvold | Kristine Ingvaldsen | Stine Østvold | – | Stine Østvold |
| 1991 | Stine Østvold | Victoria Ystborg | Stine Østvold | Stine Østvold | Stine Østvold | – |
| 1992 | Kristine Ingvaldsen | Stine Østvold | Kristine Ingvaldsen | Kristine Ingvaldsen | Stine Østvold Kristine Ingvaldsen | – |
| 1993 | Marianne Myhrer Stine Østvold | – | Kristine Ingvaldsen Marianne Myhrer | Kristine Ingvaldsen | Marianne Myhrer | Kristine Ingvaldsen |
| 1994 | Marianne Myhrer | – | Marianne Myhrer | Stine Østvold | Stine Østvold | Marianne Myhrer |
| 1995 | Stine Østvold | Marianne Myhrer | – | Stine Østvold Marianne Myhrer | Marianne Myhrer | Stine Østvold |
| 1996 | Stine Østvold | Siri Kjeksrud | – | Stine Østvold | Stine Østvold | Stine Østvold Marianne Myhrer |
| 1997 | Siri Kjeksrud | Siri Kjeksrud | Lene Bækken | – | Siri Kjeksrud | Siri Kjeksrud |
| 1998 | Siri Kjeksrud | Siri Kjeksrud | Siri Kjeksrud | – | Siri Kjeksrud | Siri Kjeksrud |
| 1999 | Siri Kjeksrud | Siri Kjeksrud | Siri Kjeksrud | Siri Kjeksrud | – | Siri Kjeksrud |
| 2000 | Ina Berg | Ina Berg | Ina Berg | Ina Berg | – | Ina Berg |
| 2001 | Lene Bergersen | Lene Bergersen | Hanne Sandberg | Lene Bergersen | Lene Bergersen | – |
| 2002 | Rikke Müller | Rikke Müller | Rikke Müller | Martine Munkvold | Rikke Müller | – |
| 2003 | Rikke Müller | – | Trine Krogstad | Rikke Müller | Rikke Müller | Rikke Müller |
| 2004 | Lise Østeby | – | Lise Østeby | Lise Østeby | Lise Østeby | Lise Østeby |
| 2005 | Lise Østeby | Lise Østeby | – | Lise Østeby | Lise Østeby | Martine Munkvold |
| 2006 | Hanna Kristine Bogetveit | Hanna Kristine Bogetveit | – | Hanna Kristine Bogetveit | Lise Østeby | Jeanette Sørensen |
| 2007 | Hanna Kristine Bogetveit | Hanna Kristine Bogetveit | Hanna Kristine Bogetveit | – | Hanna Kristine Bogetveit | Hanna Kristine Bogetveit |
| 2008 | Hanna Kristine Bogetveit | Hanna Kristine Bogetveit | Hanna Kristine Bogetveit | – | Hanna Kristine Bogetveit | Hanna Kristine Bogetveit |
| 2009 | Marte Dobbertin Gram | Marte Dobbertin Gram | Hanna Kristine Bogetveit | Marte Dobbertin Gram | – | Marte Dobbertin Gram |
| 2010 | Yngvild Rømcke | Yngvild Rømcke | Yngvild Rømcke | Yngvild Rømcke | – | Yngvild Rømcke |
| 2011 | Yngvild Rømcke | – | Yngvild Rømcke | Yngvild Rømcke | Thea Elise Holthe | Josefine Hustoft |
| 2012 | Emilie Holte | – | Silje Bogetveit | Silje Bogetveit | Silje Bogetveit | Emilie Holte |
| 2013 | Emilie Holte | – | Martine Ege Vangsal | Emilie Holte | Mia Ege Vangsal | Emilie Holte |
| 2014 | Emilie Holte | – | Emilie Holte | Fanny Lunde | Emilie Holte | Emilie Holte |
| 2015 | Emilie Holte | – | Emilie Holte | Emilie Holte | Karoline Wennberg | Emilie Holte |
| 2016 | Emilie Holte | – | Emilie Holte | Emilie Holte | Fanny Lunde | Emilie Hvidsten Swensen |
| 2017 | Emilie Holte | – | Emilie Holte | Emilie Holte | Margit Øverås | Margit Øverås |
| 2018 | Emilie Hvidsten Swensen | – | Emilie Hvidsten Swensen | Emilie Hvidsten Swensen | Margit Øverås | Emilie Hvidsten Swensen |
| 2019 | Josephine Juul Møller | – | Josephine Juul Møller | Josephine Juul Møller | Josephine Juul Møller | Ingrid Bratsberg |
| 2021 | Josephine Juul Møller | – | Anna Stoyanova | Anna Stoyanova | Anna Stoyanova | Lotte Juul Møller |
| 2022 | Josephine Juul Møller | – | Josephine Juul Møller | Josephine Juul Møller | Josephine Juul Møller | Josephine Juul Møller |
| 2023 | Josephine Juul Møller | – | Josephine Juul Møller | Josephine Juul Møller | Josephine Juul Møller | Josephine Juul Møller |
| 2024 | Josephine Juul Møller | – | Josephine Juul Møller | Josephine Juul Møller | Josephine Juul Møller | Josephine Juul Møller |
| 2025 | Josephine Juul Møller | – | Josephine Juul Møller | Josephine Juul Møller | Josephine Juul Møller | Josephine Juul Møller |
