= Josephine Juul Møller =

Norwegian rhythmic gymnast (born 2003)

Personal information
- Full name: Josephine Nordstad Juul Møller
- Born: 18 January 2003 (age 23) Bærum

Gymnastics career
- Discipline: Rhythmic gymnastics
- Country represented: Norway; (2016-present)
- Club: Asker TF
Medal record
Representing Norway
Event	1st	2nd	3rd
Nordic Championships	0	1	1
Total	0	1	1

Josephine Nordstad Juul Møller (born 18 January 2003) is a Norwegian rhythmic gymnast. She represents Norway in international competitions.

== Career ==
=== Junior ===
Juul Møller made her international debut at the 2016 European Championships in Holon, competing with hoop and clubs she was 59th and 56th with the apparatuses and 32nd in teams (alongside Anniken Heyeraas and Anna Stoyanova).

At the 2017 European Championships in Budapest she was part of the Norwegian junior group along with Stella Holmboe, Andrea Hammernes Leopold, Natalie Williams and Olivia Beyer Bruvik, finishing 23rd in the All-Around.

In January 2018 she conquered a non nominative quota for the Youth Olympics. In June she took part in the European Championships in Guadalajara, being 53rd in the All-Around, 47th with hoop, 47th with clubs and 41st with ribbon. In October she competed at the Youth Olympics in Buenos Aires, taking 24th place in the qualification round.

=== Senior ===
She became age eligible for senior competitions in 2019. In April she was crowned Norwegian champion in the All-Around, with hoop, with ball and with clubs. In August she made her debut internationally at the World Challenge Cup in Minsk, being 46th in the All-Around, 47th with hoop, 42nd with ball, 49th with clubs and 53rd with ribbon. In early September she took part in the stage in Portimão, finishing 32nd overall, 33rd with hoop, 24th with ball, 29th with clubs and 31st with ribbon. Later she was selected for the World Championships in Baku, being 76th in the All-Around, 88th with hoop, 68th with ball, 88th with clubs and 35th in teams.

Competing in the 2020 Nordic Championships she was 5th in the All-Around and won silver in teams (with Kamilla Kvamme, Anna Stoyanova, Ingrid Bratsberg and Fredrikke Tynning-Bergestuern) and bronze with ribbon.

In June 2021 she competed in the European Championships in Varna, taking 48th in the All-Around, 51st with hoop, 36th with ball, 53rd with clubs and 35th with ribbon. At nationals she won gold overall. In October she participated in the World Challenge Cup in Cluj-Napoca, being 19th in the All-Around, 15th with hoop, 19th with ball, 20th with clubs and 18th with ribbon. She was then selected for the World Championships in Kitakyushu, being 37th in the All-Around, 46th with hoop, 39th with ball, 33rd with clubs and 37th with ribbon.

At the 2022 World Cup in Pesaro she was 34th in the All-Around, 32nd with hoop, 38th with ball, 39th with clubs and 20th with ribbon. In May she won all the golds at the Norwegian Championships. Competing at the European Championships in Tel Aviv she took 43rd place in the All-Around, 47th with hoop, 44th with ball, 41st with clubs and 50th with ribbon.

In March 2023 she took part in the World Cup in Athens, finishing 34th in the All-Around, 30th with hoop, 38th with ball, 40th with clubs and 27th with ribbon. In Tashkent she was 27th in the All-Around, 32nd with hoop, 15th with ball, 19th with clubs and 32nd with ribbon. Weeks later she again claimed all the golds at nationals. Competing at the European Championships in Baku she took 40th place overall, 45th with hoop, 28th with ball, 50th with clubs and 68th with ribbon. At the World Challenge Cup in Portimão she was 27th in the All-Around, 41st with hoop, 26th with ball, 22nd with clubs and 21st with ribbon. In July, at the stage in Milan, she finished 43rd in the All-Around, 44th with hoop, 38th with ball, 55th with clubs and 28th with ribbon. She was then selected for the World Championships in Valencia, being 48th in the All-Around, 74th with hoop, 36th with ball, 57th with clubs and 33rd with ribbon.

Participating in the 2024 World Cup in Sofia she was 33rd in the All-Around, 43rd with hoop, 26th with ball, 37th with clubs and 28th with ribbon. At the European Championships in Budapest she took 33rd place overall, 33rd place with hoop, 37th with ball, 26th with clubs and 38th with ribbon. At the Norwegian Championships she won all the gold medals.

In 2025 she first competed in the World Cup in Sofia, being 53rd in the All-Around, 30th with hoop, 79th with ball, 23rd with clubs and 70th with ribbon. In Baku she took 50th place in the All-Around, 52nd with hoop, 29th with ball, 48th with clubs and 59th with ribbon. In May she was at the World Challenge Cup in Portimão, finishing 24th overall and barely missing the final with clubs being 9th, and then she retained all the gold medals at nationals. Competing at the European Championships in Tallinn she was 35th in the All-Around, 17th with hoop, 56th with ball, 27th with clubs and 60th with ribbon. In Cluj-Napoca she was 26th in the All-Around. At the Summer Universiade in the Rhine-Rhur region she finished in 20th place. In August she was selected for the World Championships in Rio de Janeiro, being 57th in the All-Around, 59th with hoop, 59th with ball, 49th with clubs and 57th with ribbon.

Making her seasonal debut at the World Cup in Sofia she was 54th in the All-Around, 37th with hoop, 32nd with ball, 88th with clubs and 36th with ribbon. The following month she took 48th place in the stage in Baku. In late May she was 21st in teams, along Mathilde Richter and the national group, and 28th place in the All-Around at the European Championships in Varna. The next month she won her 7th Norwegian title. In August she participated in the World Championships in Frankfurt, being 53rd in the All-Around, 50th with hoop, 53rd with ball, 53rd with clubs and 56th with ribbon.
