= Emilie Holte =

Norwegian rhythmic gymnast (b. 1996)

- Born: 31 July 1996 (age 30) Baerum

Gymnastics career
- Discipline: Rhythmic gymnastics
- Country represented: Norway (2013-2019)
- Club: Asker TF
- Head coach: Flavia Suarez
- Assistant coach: Bente Bjanes
- Retired: yes

Emilie Holte (born 31 July 1996) is a retired Norwegian rhythmic gymnast. She is the most domestically successful rhythmic gymnast in Norway.

== Career ==
Emilie took up gymnastics at age six at club Njard in Oslo, a year later she joined Asker TF. In 2012 she won her first national title, securing gold in ribbon and silver in hoop, ball and clubs.

In 2013 she made her debut at the World Cup in Tartu, placing 17th overall. In April she took 51st place in the All-Around at the stage in Pesaro. At the European Championships in Vienna she helped Norway achieve 30th place in teams. In August she was 48th in Saint Petersburg. She was then selected for her maiden World Championships in Kyiv, she was 86th in the All-Around, 93rd with hoop, 84th with ball, 85th with clubs and 87th with ribbon. She was again the national All-Around and ribbon champion and won silver with clubs.

The following year she competed in the World Championships in Izmir, being 91st in the All-Around, 103rd with hoop, 99th with ball, 85th with clubs, 77th with ribon and 29th in teams. She was crowned 2014 Norwegian champion in the All-Around and in the event finals except with ball in which she won silver.

In 2015 she was again selected for the World Championships in Stuttgart, finishing 88th overall, 87th with hoop, 68th with ball, 106th with clubs 98th with ribbon and 30th in teams. That year she again won gold in all events except for bronze with clubs at nationals.

In 2016 she took 35th place at the World Cup in Espoo, and won gold in the All-Around, with hoop and ball as well as silver with ribbon and bronze with clubs at the Norwegian Championships.

In April 2017 she was 50th in the World Cup in Pesaro. A month later she was 38th in Sofia. At the European Championships in Budapest she ended up being 50th with hoop, 42nd with ball, 48th with clubs and 34th with ribbon. In the World Cup in Minsk she got 33rd overall. She then retained her national title in the All-Around, with hoop and with ball, silver with ribbon. Competing at the World Championships in Pesaro she was 60th in the All-Around, with hoop and ball, 50th with clubs and 58th with ribbon.

In 2019 Holte was a member of the Norwegian group at the Universiade in Naples. There, alongside Fanny Lunde, Margit Øverås, Emilie Swensen and Karoline Wennberg, was 8th in the All-Around and with 5 balls as well as 7th with 3 hoops & 2 pair of clubs.
