= Wang Xiurong =

Chinese rhythmic gymnast

- Born: March 27, 1959 (age 67)
- Height: 164 cm (5 ft 5 in)

Gymnastics career
- Discipline: Rhythmic gymnastics
- Country represented: China
- Head coach: Han Guilan

Wang Xiurong (simplified Chinese: 王秀荣; traditional Chinese: 王秀榮; pinyin: Wáng Xiùróng, born March 27, 1959) is a retired Chinese rhythmic gymnast.

She competed for China in the rhythmic gymnastics all-around competition at the 1984 Summer Olympics in Los Angeles. She was 23rd in the qualification round and didn't advance to the final.
