= Claudia Scharmann =

German rhythmic gymnast

- Born: 13 January 1966 (age 60) Wattenscheid, North Rhine-Westphalia, West Germany
- Height: 1.60 m (5 ft 3 in)

Gymnastics career
- Discipline: Rhythmic gymnastics
- Country represented: Germany
- Club: TV Wattenscheid

Claudia Scharmann (born 13 January 1966 in Wattenscheid, North Rhine-Westphalia, West Germany) is a retired German rhythmic gymnast.

She competed for West Germany in the rhythmic gymnastics all-around competition at the 1984 Summer Olympics in Los Angeles, tying for 11th place overall.
