= Danijela Simić =

- Born: August 21, 1969 (age 57)

Gymnastics career
- Discipline: Rhythmic gymnastics
- Country represented: Yugoslavia

Danijela Simić (Serbian Cyrillic: Данијела Симић; born August 21, 1969) is a Serbian rhythmic gymnast. At the age of 14, she represented Yugoslavia at the 1984 Summer Olympics where she finished tenth in the individual all-around.
