= Lorraine Priest =

British rhythmic gymnast (born 1966)

- Full name: Lorraine Alison Priest
- Born: 5 June 1966 (age 60) Leeds, West Yorkshire, Great Britain
- Height: 166 cm (5 ft 5 in) (at the 1984 Olympics)

Gymnastics career
- Discipline: Rhythmic gymnastics
- Country represented: Great Britain
- Club: Leeds Gymnastics Club

Lorraine Priest (born 5 June 1966 in Leeds) is a British rhythmic gymnast.

Priest competed for Great Britain in the rhythmic gymnastics individual all-around competition at the 1984 Summer Olympics in Los Angeles. There she tied for 28th place in the preliminary (qualification) round and did not advance to the final.
