= Bénédicte Augst =

French rhythmic gymnast (born 1968)

- Born: 28 January 1968 (age 58)
- Height: 172 cm (5 ft 8 in)

Gymnastics career
- Discipline: Rhythmic gymnastics
- Country represented: France

Bénédicte Augst (born 28 January 1968) is a retired French rhythmic gymnast.

She represented France in the individual rhythmic gymnastics all-around competition at the 1984 Olympic Games in Los Angeles. She was 21st in the qualification round and didn't advance to the final.
