= Grazia Verzasconi =

- Born: 14 March 1962 (age 64)
- Height: 165 cm (5 ft 5 in) (at the 1984 Olympics)

Gymnastics career
- Discipline: Rhythmic gymnastics
- Country represented: Switzerland

Grazia Verzasconi (born 14 March 1962) is a Swiss rhythmic gymnast.

Verzasconi competed for Switzerland in the rhythmic gymnastics individual all-around competition at the 1984 Summer Olympics in Los Angeles. There she was 14th in the preliminary (qualification) round and advanced to the final of 20 competitors. In the end she finished in the 16th place overall.
