= Liat Haninowitz =

Israeli rhythmic gymnast

Liat Haninowitz ליאת חנינוביץ
- Born: January 2, 1966 (age 60)
- Height: 167 cm (5 ft 6 in)

Gymnastics career
- Discipline: Rhythmic gymnastics
- Country represented: Israel
- Club: Hapoel Holon

Liat Haninowitz (Hebrew: ליאת חנינוביץ; also "Haninovich"; born January 2, 1966) is an Israeli former Olympic rhythmic gymnast. She was also Israeli National Champion in rhythmic gymnastics in 1984.

== Rhythmic gymnastics career ==
Her club was Hapoel Holon.

She competed for Israel at the 1984 Summer Olympics in Los Angeles, California at the age of 18 in Rhythmic Gymnastics. In Women's Rhythmic Individual All-Around she came in 27th, in Hoop she came in 17th, in Ball she came in tied for 20th, in Clubs she came in tied for 27th, and in Ribbon she came in 31st. She was 5 ft 5.5 in (166 cm) tall, and 123 lb (56 kg) when she competed in the Olympics.

She was also Israeli National Champion in rhythmic gymnastics in 1984.
