= Valerie Zimring =

American rhythmic gymnast

- Full name: Valerie Le Zimring-Schneiderman
- Born: March 28, 1965 (age 61) Los Angeles, California
- Height: 1.62 m (5 ft 4 in)

Gymnastics career
- Discipline: Rhythmic gymnastics
- Country represented: United States; (1979–85)

Valerie Le Zimring-Schneiderman (born March 28, 1965, in Los Angeles) is a former Olympic rhythmic gymnast. She represented the United States at the 1984 Summer Olympics, and finished 11th in the individual all-around.

== Early life ==
Zimring was born in Los Angeles, and lived in Cheviot Hills, Los Angeles. She attended UCLA for college and graduate school, earning a B.A. as well as an M.A. in program-dance.

== Career ==
At 11 years of age, Zimring learned she had a stress fracture in her back. Having just reached the Class I level in artistic gymnastics, she had to leave it to pursue rhythmic gymnastics, which she was still able to do.

Zimring was a member of the United States National Team for seven years (1979–85) and the USA World Championship team from 1981 to 1983. In 1982, she won the All-Around title at the U.S. Junior National Championship. She also won at the Austrian Invitational in 1983, becoming the first American to win an international Rhythmic Gymnastics competition.

She competed at the 1981 World Championships and the 1983 World Championships, finishing 44th and 48th in the all-around respectively. She was the 1984 National All-around Champion, qualifying to compete in the Olympics.

She represented the United States at the 1984 Summer Olympics, and finished 11th in the individual all-around. It was the best finish to date by an American in that event.

Zimring is Jewish, and won five gold medals at the 1985 Maccabiah Games in Israel.

Zimring coached the USA National Team in 1987–88.

== Halls of Fame ==
She was inducted into the Southern California Jewish Sports Hall of Fame in 1990. She was inducted into the USA Gymnastics Hall of Fame in 2007.

== See also ==
- List of Jewish gymnasts
