= Sarina Roberti =

Belgian rhythmic gymnast

- Born: 18 April 1963 (age 63) Ghent, East Flanders, Belgium
- Height: 160 cm (5 ft 3 in) (at the 1984 Olympics)

Gymnastics career
- Discipline: Rhythmic gymnastics
- Country represented: Belgium

Sarina Roberti (18 April 1963 in Ghent) is a Belgian rhythmic gymnast.

Roberti competed for Belgium in the rhythmic gymnastics individual all-around competition at the 1984 Summer Olympics in Los Angeles. There she tied for 24th place in the preliminary (qualification) round and did not advance to the final.
