= Viktoria Bengtsson =

Swedish rhythmic gymnast (born 1966)

- Born: 29 April 1966 (age 60) Halmstad, Halland, Sweden
- Height: 167 cm (5 ft 6 in) (at the 1984 Olympics)

Gymnastics career
- Discipline: Rhythmic gymnastics
- Country represented: Sweden
- Club: SK Laxen, Halmstad

Viktoria Bengtsson (29 April 1966 in Halmstad) is a Swedish rhythmic gymnast.

Bengtsson competed for Sweden in the rhythmic gymnastics individual all-around competition at the 1984 Summer Olympics in Los Angeles. There she was 20th in the preliminary (qualification) round and advanced to the final of 20 competitors. In the end she finished in the 19th place overall.
