= Huang Xianyuan =

Chinese rhythmic gymnast

- Born: February 2, 1966 (age 60) Guangdong, China
- Height: 164 cm (5 ft 5 in)

Gymnastics career
- Discipline: Rhythmic gymnastics
- Country represented: China
- Head coach: Han Guilan

Huang Xianyuan (simplified Chinese: 黄贤媛; traditional Chinese: 黃賢媛; pinyin: Huáng Xiányuán, born February 2, 1966) is a retired Chinese rhythmic gymnast.

She competed for China in the rhythmic gymnastics all-around competition at the 1984 Summer Olympics in Los Angeles. She was 32nd in the qualification round and didn't advance to the final.
