= Sumire Kita =

Japanese rhythmic gymnast

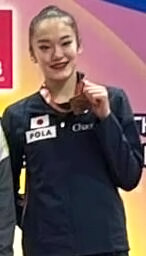
- Kita on the 2022 Asian Championships ball final podium

Personal information
- Full name: Sumire Kita
- Born: 11 January 2001 (age 25) Kagawa Prefecture, Japan
- Height: 165 cm (5 ft 5 in)

Gymnastics career
- Discipline: Rhythmic gymnastics
- Country represented: Japan; (2013 - 2022)
- Club: Angel RG Kagawa
- Gym: Takamatsu Chuo High School
- Head coach: Oka Kurumi
- Assistant coach: Elena Nefedova
- Former coach: Yu Liu
- Retired: December 21, 2022
- World ranking: 21 WCC (2017 Season)
Medal record
Representing Japan
Rhythmic Gymnastics
Asian Championships
Silver medal – second place	2017 Astana	Team
Silver medal – second place	2022 Pattaya	All-around
Silver medal – second place	2022 Pattaya	Hoop
Bronze medal – third place	2017 Astana	Ribbon
Bronze medal – third place	2022 Pattaya	Ball
Bronze medal – third place	2022 Pattaya	Clubs

Sumire Kita (Japanese: 喜田 純鈴; born 11 January 2001) is a retired Japanese individual rhythmic gymnast. She is the 2016 Asian Junior all-around champion, the 2022 Asian Senior all-around silver medalist, two-time Japanese National Junior champion, and four-time Japanese National senior champion.

== Personal life ==
Kita started doing rhythmic gymnastics at age two. Her mother also practiced rhythmic gymnastics until she went to university. Kita speaks Japanese and Russian.

Her younger sister, Mirano Kita, is also an individual rhythmic gymnast and has represented Japan at multiple international FIG events.

== Career ==
In 2013, Kita debuted at the Japan National Rhythmic Gymnastics Championships, where she became the youngest ever to take second place. Kita was coached by Yu Liu, a former Chinese rhythmic gymnast who came to Japan to study and on meeting Kita at her small gymnastics studio in Kagawa Prefecture, recognized her as a gymnast with great potential. Kita thereafter spent part of her training time in Russia's famous Novogorsk center for rhythmic gymnastics.

Kita competed at the 2014 Aeon Cup. In 2015, she competed at the Junior Grand Prix in Moscow and numerous other junior tournaments, including events in Lisbon, Corbeil-Essonnes and Budapest. Kita also finished 5th in the junior all-around at the 2015 Aeon Cup in Tokyo, Japan. At the 2016 Asian Junior Championships in Astana, Kita won gold medals in the all-around, rope, clubs as well as bronze medals in hoop, ball, and team.

In 2017, Kita parted with her childhood coach Liu and began training under Elena Nefedova. She debuted in the World Cup Series, competing at the 2017 World Challenge Cup Guadalajara. She finished 17th in the all-around, she qualified in 1 apparatus final in clubs finishing in 8th place. On June 24–27, Kita competed at the 2017 Asian Championships where she finished 4th in the all-around. Kita, together with the rest of the Japanese team, won the bronze medal. She qualified for two apparatus finals and won bronze in ribbon and placed 5th in hoop. On July 7–9, Kita finished 9th in the all-around at the 2017 Berlin World Challenge Cup. She qualified for the ball final, where she finished in 7th place. On August 5–7, Kita finished 10th in the all-around behind Olena Diachenko at the 2017 Minsk World Challenge Cup. She qualified for the hoop and ribbon finals and finished in 8th place for both events. On August 11–13, Kita competed at the 2017 Kazan World Challenge Cup. She was 14th in the all-around and did not qualify in any of apparatus finals. On August 30–September 3, Kita and Kaho Minagawa represented Japan in the individual competition at the 2017 World Championships in Pesaro, Italy; she qualified in the hoop final and finished in 7th place. Kita finished 12th in the all-around final behind Evita Griskenas.

In 2018, Kita started the season with the 2018 Moscow Grand Prix. She finished 8th in the all-around and qualified into the clubs and ribbon finals. However, she was forced to return to Japan for a time due to pain in her lower back, which was caused by an avulsion fracture. She competed with only two apparatuses at the 2018 World Championships and again at the 2019 World Championships.

In 2021, Kita was chosen to represent Japan at the Olympic Games in Tokyo alongside teammate Chisaki Oiwa. She placed eleventh in the overall individual ranking, being 0.300 points behind the Ukrainian Khrystyna Pohranychna, and was the first reserve for the all-around final.

Kita won her fourth Japanese national title in 2022, along with winning every event final at Japanese Nationals. She announced her retirement in December.

== Routine music information ==
Year	Apparatus	Music title
2022	Hoop	L'estasi dell'oro by Ennio Morricone
2022	Ball	Fever (Remastered), Fever (Extended Swing Mix) by Peggy Lee
2022	Clubs	Bolero by Prequell
2022	Ribbon	Libertango in Berlin Philharmonic by Aydar Gaynullin
2021	Hoop	Satisfy by Nero
2021	Ball	Helele-Safri Duo Extended Mix by Velile, Safri Duo
2021	Clubs	SKIBIDI by Little Big
2021	Ribbon	Libertango in Berlin Philharmonic by Aydar Gaynullin
2019	Hoop	The Plaza of Execution(Instrumental) by James Horner & Orchestra
2019	Ball	Assassin's Tango by John Powell
2019	Clubs (first)	Big Band (Electro Swing English Radio Edit) (feat. Nicolle Rochette & Charlie Magoo by Bart&Baker
2019	Clubs (second)	Marry The Night (Afrojack Remix) by Lady Gaga
2019	Ribbon	James Bond Theme (Oscar Salguero Mix Edit) by Le Chiffre
2018	Hoop	Caruso by Filippa Giordano
2018	Ball	Larrons en Foire by Raphael Beau
2018	Clubs	Big Band (Electro Swing English Radio Edit) (feat. Nicolle Rochette & Charlie Magoo by Bart&Baker
2018	Ribbon	James Bond Theme (Oscar Salguero Mix Edit) by Le Chiffre
2017	Hoop	Lucia di Lammermoor, The Diva Dance music from Éric Serra by Inva Mula
2017	Ball	Tango D'amor by Tango Jointz
2017	Clubs	Mambo Italiano by Dany Brillant
2017	Ribbon	Cry Me a River (violin version) music from Justin Timberlake's Justified (album) by EKLIPSE
2015/2016	Rope	White Roses Are Blooming by 101 Strings Orchestra
2015/2016	Hoop	Another Cha Cha / Cha Cha Suite by Santa Esmeralda
2015/2016	Ball	Chopin by Edvin Marton
2015/2016	Clubs	European Taxim by Marios Strofalis
2014	Hoop	Jennys Abschlusskonzert by Kae Shirati
2014	Ball	Chopin by Edvin Marton
2014	Clubs	Show Me Your Love by Tina Karol
2014	Ribbon	Flamenko (Koster) by Didula
