= Cristina Cimino =

Italian rhythmic gymnast (born 1964)

- Born: 20 February 1964 (age 62) Rome, Italy
- Height: 1.69 m (5 ft 6 1/2 in)

Gymnastics career
- Discipline: Rhythmic gymnastics
- Country represented: Italy

Cristina Cimino (born 20 February 1964 in Rome) is a retired Italian rhythmic gymnast.

She competed for Italy in the rhythmic gymnastics all-around competition at the 1984 Summer Olympics in Los Angeles. She was 15th in the qualification and advanced to the final, placing 15th overall.
