= Hiroko Yamasaki =

Japanese rhythmic gymnast

- Born: January 3, 1960 (age 66) Minamikyushu, Kagoshima Prefecture, Japan
- Height: 153 cm (5 ft 0 in)

Gymnastics career
- Discipline: Rhythmic gymnastics
- Country represented: Japan

Hiroko Yamasaki (山﨑 浩子, Yamasaki Hiroko; born January 3, 1960, Minamikyushu, Kagoshima) is a retired Japanese individual rhythmic gymnast who competed at the 1984 Summer Olympics. She now works as a coach and was the director of the national group for 17 years.

== Career ==
Yamasaki began rhythmic gymnastics during middle school. After enrolling at the Tokyo Women's College of Physical Education, she became a five-time national champion.

At her debut at the World Championships in 1979, she finished in 20th. She placed 12th at the 1981 World Championships, tied with Marta Bobo, and at the 1983 World Championships, she tied for 34th place with four other gymnasts.

She competed for Japan in the individual rhythmic gymnastics all-around competition at the 1984 Olympic Games in Los Angeles. She tied for 9th place in the qualification round and advanced to the final, placing 8th overall. Yamasaki retired later the same year.

== Coaching career ==
After finishing her competitive career, Yamasaki began coaching as well as working as a sports writer. She became a training director for the Japan Gymnastics Association in 2004, a position she held until 2021, and directed the national group, which won a silver all-around medal at the 2019 World Championships. Part of her strategy for developing the group included numerous training camps in Russia and bringing on a Russian coach. In 2025, she returned as the assistant manager of the national group.

== Personal life ==
In August 1992, Yamasaki was part of a highly publicized mass wedding organized by the Unification Church. She broke with the church less than a year later, after her family sought help from a pastor who persuaded her to leave before her marriage was legally registered. She held a press conference in April 1993, claiming that the church was abusive, and wrote about her experiences in a memoir published in 1994.
