= Alina Drăgan =

Romanian rhythmic gymnast

- Born: 11 May 1969 (age 57) Bucharest, Romania
- Height: 1.53 m (5 ft 0 in)

Gymnastics career
- Discipline: Rhythmic gymnastics
- Country represented: Romania

Alina Drăgan (born 11 May 1969 in Bucharest) is a retired Romanian rhythmic gymnast.

She competed for Romania in the rhythmic gymnastics all-around competition at the 1984 Olympic Games in Los Angeles. She finished 2nd in the qualification and just out of the medals (4th) overall.
