= Margarida Carmo =

Portuguese rhythmic gymnast

- Born: 20 April 1969 (age 57)
- Height: 166 cm (5 ft 5 in) (at the 1984 Olympics)

Gymnastics career
- Discipline: Rhythmic gymnastics
- Country represented: Portugal

Margarida Carmo (born 20 April 1969) is a Portuguese rhythmic gymnast.

Carmo competed for Portugal in the rhythmic gymnastics individual all-around competition at the 1984 Summer Olympics in Los Angeles. There she was 16th in the preliminary (qualification) round and advanced to the final of 20 competitors. In the end she finished in the 18th place overall.
