= Linda Douglas (gymnast) =

Australian rhythmic gymnast

- Full name: Linda Douglas
- Born: 18 November 1965 (age 60) Victoria, Australia
- Height: 177 cm (5 ft 10 in)

Gymnastics career
- Discipline: Rhythmic gymnastics
- Country represented: Australia

Linda Douglas (born 18 November 1965) is an Australian rhythmic gymnast. Born in Victoria, Douglas was selected to be part of the Australian team at the 1984 Summer Olympics in rhythmic gymnastics. She competed at the 1984 Victorian Gymnastics Championships before the games as part of her preparations.

At the 1984 Summer Games, she had placed last in the qualifying round of the women's individual all-around and did not qualify for the semi-finals. In her later years, she held managerial positions in educational institutes such as being appointed the principal of Wenona School.

== Biography ==
Linda Douglas was born on 18 November 1965 in Victoria, Australia. She was selected to be part of Australia's team at the 1984 Summer Olympics in Los Angeles, United States, in rhythmic gymnastics. Before the Games, she and her teammate Ann Maree Kerr, competed at the 1984 Victorian Gymnastics Championships at the Melbourne Sports and Entertainment Centre for their preparations for the Summer Games.

The 1984 Summer Games would be the first edition of the Summer Olympics to feature artistic gymnastics, thus making Douglas and Kerr the first Australian rhythmic gymnasts to compete at an Olympic Games. The events were held at the Pauley Pavilion. She competed in the qualification rounds of the women's individual all-around on 9 August against 32 other competitors. She scored 8.60 on hoop, 8.70 on ball, 8.65 on clubs, and 8.20 on ribbon, for an overall score of 34.15. She ranked last on every apparatus except the clubs, where she placed 32nd. Douglas placed 33rd out of the 33 competitors that competed, not advancing further. She was awarded an Athlete Award of Distinction by Gymnastics Australia after having competed for the nation at the Summer Games.

In 2025, Douglas became the principal of Wenona School. At the announcement, she talked about her experiences at the Summer Games. She is an Executive Governing Director of the International Coalition of Girls' Schools.
