= Naruha Suzuki =

Japanese rhythmic gymnast

- 鈴木 菜巴
- Born: 6 March 2005 (age 21) Hyōgo, Japan

Gymnastics career
- Discipline: Rhythmic gymnastics
- Country represented: Japan; (2021-)
- Club: Arishie Hyogo
- Gym: Mukogawa Women's University

Naruha Suzuki (Japanese: 鈴木 菜巴; born 6 March 2005) is a Japanese rhythmic gymnast. She represents her country in international competitions. She is the 2025 Japanese all-around champion.

== Career ==
In her first senior season, Suzuki represented Japan at the 2022 World Games in Birmingham, United States. She was 13th in hoop, 20th in ball and 10th in both clubs and ribbon.

In 2023, Suzuki represented Japan at the 2021 Summer World University Games in Chengdu, China. She took 4th place in all-around behind her teammate Reina Matsusaka.

In 2024, she competed at International Tournament Aphrodite Cup in Greece and won silver medal in ball final. She made her World Cup debut at Cluj-Napoca World Challenge Cup and placed 25th in the all-around. She took 4th place in all-around at Japanese Championships that year and won silver medals in hoop and ribbon final.

In 2025, she competed at Tashkent World Cup and took 14th place in all-around. She qualified to clubs final, where she ended on 7th place. She won gold medal in all-around at Japanese Championships that year.

In May 2026, she competed at the 2026 Asian Championships in Bishkek and placed 15th in the all-around final. She qualified to clubs final, finishing 5th. In June, she competed at Beijing World Challenge Cup, taking 10th place in the all-around. She qualified to two apparatus finals (clubs, ribbon), taking 7th place in both. In August, she was again selected to represent Japan alongside Mirano Kita at the 2026 World Championships in Frankfurt, Germany. Together with senior group they took 12th place in team competition. She took 26th place in all-around qualifications. In October, she competed at the 2026 Asian Games in Nagoya, Japan. She took 14th place in the all-around qualifications.

== Routine music information ==
Year	Apparatus	Music title
2026	Hoop	Ohoku (main theme) by Arisa Okehazama
2026	Ball	
2026	Clubs	Clubbed To Death (Remix) by Luche
2026	Ribbon	
2023	Hoop	Tandav Music by Anu Malik
2023	Ball	BOOM BOOM (John Lee Hooker Cover) by 2WEI
2023	Clubs	Another Day of Sun by La La Land Cast
2023	Ribbon	The Plaza of Execution (Instrumental) by James Horner & Orchestra
