= Marta Bobo =

Spanish rhythmic gymnast

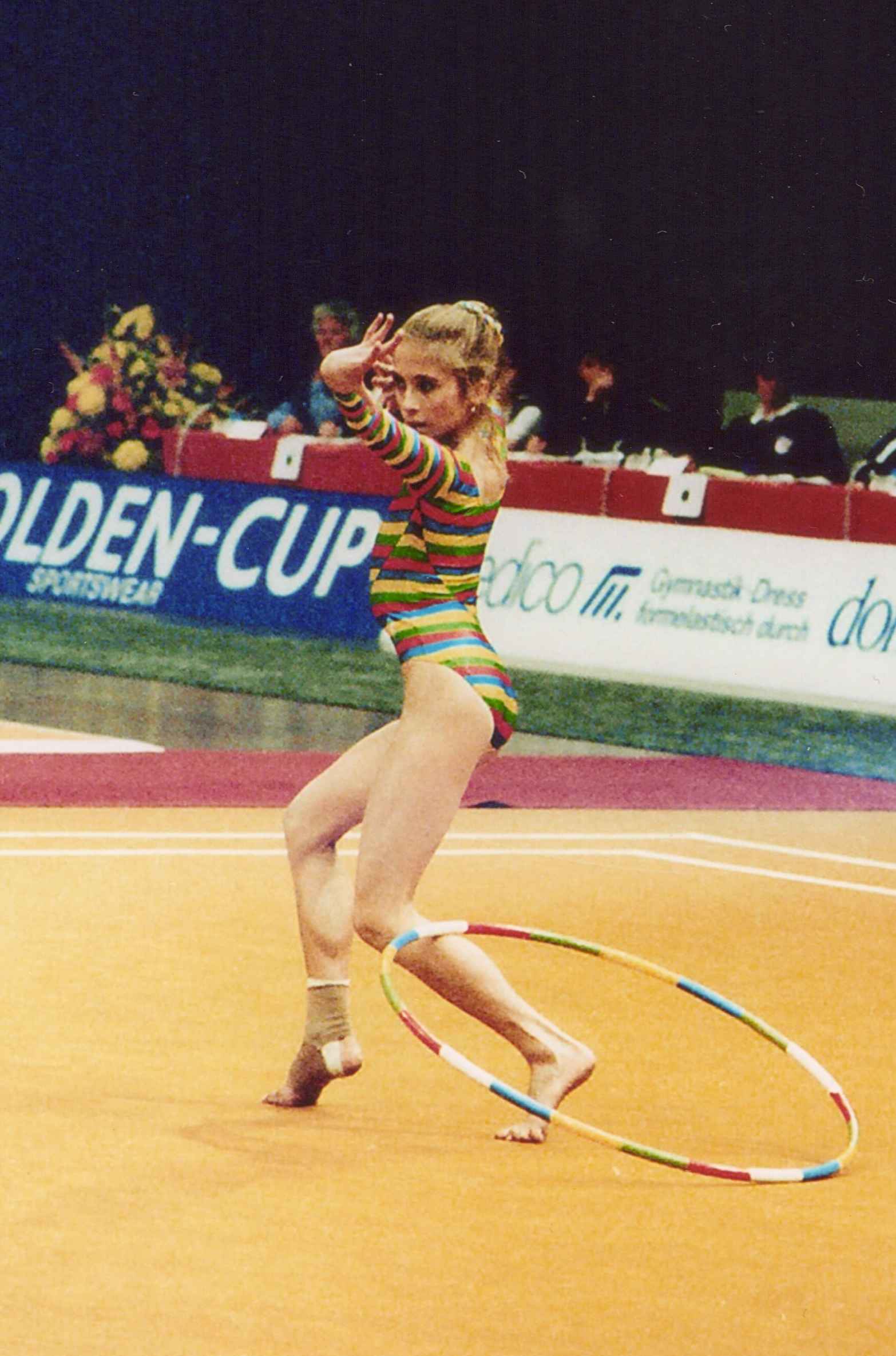
- Marta Bobo at the 1984 Europeans

Personal information
- Full name: Marta Bobo Arce
- Born: 18 March 1966 (age 60) Orense
- Height: 156 cm (5 ft 1 in)

Gymnastics career
- Discipline: Rhythmic gymnastics
- Country represented: Spain
- Head coach: Ivanka Chakarova

Marta Bobo Arce (born 18 March 1966 in Orense) is a retired Spanish rhythmic gymnast.

She competed for Spain in the rhythmic gymnastics all-around competition at the 1984 Summer Olympics in Los Angeles. She was eighth in the qualification and advanced to the final, placing ninth overall.
