= Michelle Berube =

American actress and gymnast

- Born: March 1, 1966 (age 60) Rochester Hills, Michigan, US

Gymnastics career
Medal record
Rhythmic gymnastics
Representing United States
Four Continents Championships
| Silver medal – second place | 1988 Toronto | All-around |

Michelle Berube is an American actress and retired Olympic gymnast.

== Rhythmic gymnastics champion ==
Berube was inducted into the USA Gymnastics Hall of Fame in 2004. She competed at the 1984 Olympic Games and 1988 Olympic Games, finishing in 14th and 22nd place respectively.

== Filmography ==
| Year | Title | Role | Notes |
|---|---|---|---|
| 1996 | From Dusk Till Dawn | Bar Dancer | |
| 1997 | Jackie Brown | Baretta 12S Brittany | |
| 1998 | Breaking the Magician's Code: Magic's Biggest Secrets Finally Revealed | Herself - Magic Assistant | |
