= Suzanne Müller =

Swiss rhythmic gymnast (born 1963)

- Born: 15 February 1963 (age 63) Interlaken, Bern, Switzerland
- Height: 165 cm (5 ft 5 in) (at the 1984 Olympics)

Gymnastics career
- Discipline: Rhythmic gymnastics
- Country represented: Switzerland

Suzanne Müller (-Nelson) (born 15 February 1963 in Interlaken, Bern) is a Swiss rhythmic gymnast.

Müller competed for Switzerland in the rhythmic gymnastics individual all-around competition at the 1984 Summer Olympics in Los Angeles. There she tied for 28th place in the preliminary (qualification) round and did not advance to the final.
