= Ann Maree Kerr =

Australian rhythmic gymnast

- Born: 21 October 1967 (age 58)
- Height: 157 cm (5 ft 2 in) (at the 1984 Olympics)
- Spouse: Phil Kerry

Gymnastics career
- Discipline: Rhythmic gymnastics
- Country represented: Australia
- Head coach: Ileana Vogellsr

Ann Maree Kerr (21 October 1967) is an Australian rhythmic gymnast.

Kerr competed for Australia in the rhythmic gymnastics individual all-around competition at the 1984 Summer Olympics in Los Angeles. There she was 26th in the preliminary (qualification) round and did not advance to the final.
