= Rosane Favilla =

Brazilian rhythmic gymnast

- Born: July 16, 1964 (age 62) Rio de Janeiro, RJ
- Height: 163 cm (5 ft 4 in) (at the 1984 Olympics)

Gymnastics career
- Discipline: Rhythmic gymnastics
- Country represented: Brazil

Rosane Favilla (born July 16, 1964) is a retired Brazilian rhythmic gymnast.

Favilla competed for Brazil in the rhythmic gymnastics individual all-around competition at the 1984 Summer Olympics in Los Angeles. There she tied for 24th place in the preliminary (qualification) round and did not advance to the final.

== See also ==
- List of Olympic rhythmic gymnasts for Brazil
