= Schirin Zorriassateiny =

Norwegian rhythmic gymnast

- Born: 3 April 1964 (age 62) Lørenskog, Akershus, Norway
- Height: 167 cm (5 ft 6 in) (at the 1984 Olympics)

Gymnastics career
- Discipline: Rhythmic gymnastics
- Country represented: Norway
- Club: Rustad Idrettslag, Oslo

Schirin Zorriassateiny (born 3 April 1964 in Lørenskog, Akershus) is a retired Norwegian rhythmic gymnast who competed as both an individual and group member. She competed at the 1984 Summer Olympics and is a three-time Norwegian national champion.

== Biography ==
Zorriassateiny was born in Lørenskog and moved to Bogerud as a child. Her mother took her to the sports club Rustad Idrettslag, where she began gymnastics. In her early teens, she stopped; however, her coach learned about rhythmic gymnastics and recruited Zorriassateiny and five other gymnasts to form a group.

She competed at the 1979 World Championships in London, where she was inspired by seeing more skilled gymnasts and began to intensify her training as both a group and individual gymnast. A few years later, she competed at the 1982 European Championships held in her home country of Norway, where she tied for 22nd in the all-around and placed 5th with the group. She won three individual all-around national titles from 1982 to 1984.

Zorriassateiny later said that she realized that she would not be able to compete for medals at top competitions due to her training environment, but that she looked to improve upon her own performances. She also became critical of and frustrated with the domestic gymnastic system, where she saw too much secrecy and a lack of cooperation between clubs. In addition, at the time, she was the only one in her club competing as an individual, and her coaches had a decreasing amount of time available to support her.

Zorriassateiny competed for Norway in the rhythmic gymnastics individual all-around competition at the 1984 Summer Olympics in Los Angeles. There she was 19th in the qualification round and advanced to the final of 20 competitors. In the final, she finished in 20th place overall.

In 1985, she lost the Norwegian national title by 0.06 points. A visiting Bulgarian coach trained her for several weeks; Zorriassateiny said she enjoyed their collaboration. She won the 1985 Nordic Championships, which she called "perhaps my best competition ever". Her last competition was the 1985 World Championships. She spent the last month of her career preparing for the competition alone, as her coaches were busy after having children and the visiting coach had left. She tied for 58th place.

Although she struggled with her transition out of competitive sports, she said that she never considered returning to gymnastics, as she had "many reasons" to stop. After her retirement, she criticized judges of the time for rewarding routines that emphasized contortion and very slim gymnasts, as she considered it to be dangerous for gymnasts to pursue those goals, especially for those training in less professional environments such as hers.

She attended the Norwegian School of Sport Sciences and enrolled in the Norwegian National Academy of Ballet in 1985. She later studied yoga and Rosen Method Bodywork and now works as a yoga teacher in Amsterdam.
