= María João Falcão =

Portuguese rhythmic gymnast

- Born: 16 November 1964 (age 61)
- Height: 156 cm (5 ft 1 in) (at the 1984 Olympics)

Gymnastics career
- Discipline: Rhythmic gymnastics
- Country represented: Portugal

María João Falcão (born 16 November 1964) is a Portuguese rhythmic gymnast.

Falcão competed for Portugal in the rhythmic gymnastics individual all-around competition at the 1984 Summer Olympics in Los Angeles. There she was 22nd in the preliminary (qualification) round and did not advance to the final.
